= Adam Gnade =

American singer

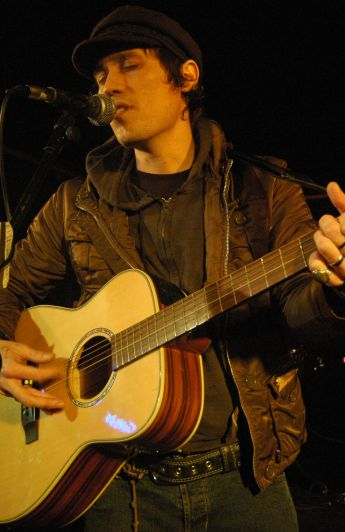

Background information
- Origin: San Diego, California
- Genres: Talking blues Noise folk Americana
- Instruments: Vocals, banjo, tenor guitar, guitar
- Years active: 2005–present
- Labels: Punch Drunk Press, Three One G, Pioneers Press, Drowned in Sound, Try Harder Records
- Website: adamgnade.com

Adam Gnade (/ɡəˈnɑːdi/ gə-NAH-dee) is a San Diego, California-born American musician and author currently living on a farm in rural Kansas. In his bio he defines his music as "talking-songs", which he describes as mixing the spoken vocals of talking blues songs with country music, Appalachian folk, noise, psychedelic folk and drone music influences. His work is issued as a series of records and books, which continue the stories of each other's characters and further develop plot-lines. Considered a regionalist writer, he writes mostly about San Diego, a bordertown city in Southern California, namely the area around the US/Mexico border, though many of his stories take place to the south of San Diego in the city of Tijuana, Mexico. Gnade also writes stories that take places across the continental US but according to interviews he's done these stories always reflect the Californian's experience on the road.

== Biography ==
Originally from San Diego, California, and while living there, Gnade was an editor of the alt-weekly Fahrenheit San Diego. After leaving San Diego in 2005, he lived in Portland, Oregon where he was the music editor for The Portland Mercury while his former partner, Jessie Duke, worked for Microcosm Publishing.

== Career ==
=== Musician ===
In late 2005, Gnade signed to the California-based Loud + Clear Records, toured the US, and issued Run Hide Retreat Surrender, his first official full-length record after a series of self-released, extremely limited edition CDs and cassettes.

In 2006, he issued a set of limited run experimental albums (We Are Ghosts and Bones Down Stone-Walled Wells and the 2 CD single) expanding on his "talking songs" idea before signing a UK label deal with Drowned in Sound (also home to collaborators Youthmovies). Drowned in Sound released Gnade's EP Shout the Rafters Down! in November 2006, after which he toured Europe in support of the record, alongside Oxford, England's Youthmovies and Brighton's Blood Red Shoes.

Gnade also recorded a "talking song"-style track with Faux-Hoax in mid-2006, a side project band featuring Dave Allen, the bass guitar player of the 1970s British post-punk band Gang of Four, John Askew from Oregon indie rock group Tracker, and Danny Seim of Menomena and Lackthereof. The track, "Your Friends Will Carry You Home," was released on a 7" of the same name by Polyvinyl Record Co. in May 2009. The 7" also features members of Portland, Oregon's Modest Mouse and 31 Knots.

As of 2007, recent U.S., European, Mexican, Canadian, and United Kingdom radio singles included "Hymn California," "Honey Slides," "Dance to the War," "The Winter/Their Apartment," "Room for Three and the Bayou Summer," "Palaces," "Lanterns, Rakes, and Shovels," "We're Unknowing in the Crosshairs," "The Old Lover," "Snake Lore," "It's Five O'Clock in America," "We Must Come Home Again," and "We Live Nowhere and Know No One."

2007 saw a two-month US tour, a five-week tour of England and Scotland (alongside Youthmovies, Jonquil, House of Brothers, Blanket, and Eugene McGuinness), and the release of Honey Slides, a collaborative EP with Youthmovies on the Try Harder Records label. There was also a tour-only novella, entitled Seasons Loving Nothing, that was available on the UK dates.

His next full-length, Trailerparks, was released by Try Harder Records as a limited-edition, tour-only pressing in late 2008 in time for a three-week tour of Europe with Youthmovies.

In November 2008, the experimental label Blast First (Petite) released a Youthmovies EP entitled Polyp which features Gnade contributing lead vocals to two tracks, "Sad Trash" and "Become an Island" which also features contributions from Joe Shrewsbury from 65DaysofStatic and Hugo Manuel of Jonquil. The resulting tour in November 2008 featuring both acts was called the Polyp Tour.

On February 22, 2009, Gnade announced the release of a new EP. Island's Islands will be released on cassette and limited to just 100 copies. On his website Gnade revealed that each copy of the EP would be recorded separately and each would be completely different. Gnade's next record The Wild Homesick was released in May 2009 on the Punch Drunk Press label.

In July and August 2009 Gnade joined the Van's Warped Tour for a book tour. His tour diaries were published on the Asthmatic Kitty Records website and by the Willamette Week newspaper.

In August 2009, Punch Drunk Press, released a three-way split CD album featuring his songs and the songs of Ohioan and COASTS. It is called Hello America!

In January 2010, a new cassette EP, Surrenderland, was released by Punch Drunk Press.

On January 31, 2010 he announced the release of a collection of rare tracks, From Farmhouses to Tour Vans.

In August 2011, it was announced via the Lungs, Dirt, and Dreams website as well as via assorted media outlets that Gnade would be touring alongside Atlanta experimental country band Damon Moon and the Whispering Drifters. On Gnade's website he announced there would be a special tour-only cassette featuring both acts as well as a split cassette featuring folksinger Megan Michelle.

In June 2012, Gnade and folksinger Megan Michelle released a split album of acoustic songs via Punch Drunk Press.

In May 2013, Gnade's recently recorded record, entitled AMERICANS, was released by the UK label Blessing Force.

In September 2013, Punch Drunk Press released Gnade's latest EP, Greater Mythology Blues, recorded in Atlanta, Georgia with the help of his backing band, The Hot Earth All-Stars, featuring members of Brunch, Under White Pines, and Sydney Eloise and Palms. The record was released the following August.

Two EPs, AMERICANS and Greater Mythology Blues and a single, the Locust House Excerpt featuring Three One G band Planet B (made up of members of The Locust, Retox, Head Wound City, Dead Cross), were released later in the summer.

In March 2017, the Three One G label released Gnade's EP Life is the Meatgrinder that Sucks in All Things. His backing band was Gabe Serbian and Justin Pearson of The Locust and Head Wound City with Luke Henshaw of Sonido de la Frontera.

There were several announcements in January 2018. It also announced that Gnade would be releasing his next record, Voicemails from the Great Satan, via Justin Pearson's Three One G label and would be supporting the record with a short UK tour with the reunited Youthmovies.

In August 2019, Gnade released a collection of acoustic demos entitled The Goddamn Marching Tide and toured behind the songs with the writer Nathaniel Kennon Perkins.

=== Author ===
In September 2008, DutchMoney Books released a novel of Gnade's writing that continues the stories of the albums' characters. It is called Hymn California. A novella of connected material entitled The Darkness to the West was released in December 2008 via Punch Drunk Press.

In 2011, Gnade released three novellas. California was released by Double Suns studio as a hardback book and The Heat and the Hot Earth and Hey Hey Lonesome were released by Punch Drunk Press.

Released in July 2012, Gnade's latest novella was entitled The Growling Mouth, and it was released on the Punch Drunk Press label.

In late 2012, Punch Drunk Press released The Hard Fifty Farm, a split chapbook featuring writing by Gnade and Microcosm Distribution/Pioneers Press owner Jessie Duke. In spring 2013, Pioneers Press released Gnade's first work of nonfiction, The Do It Yourself Guide to Fighting the Big Motherfuckin' Sad, which topped Powell's Books small press bestseller list in May 2013. Since its initial release as a zine, The DIY Guide has seen several changes with each new edition. It is now available as a perfect bound book.

In 2013, Gnade released The Do-It-Yourself Guide to Fighting the Big Motherfuckin’ Sad which was the top-selling small-press title at Powell's Books in 2013.

In December 2013, Gnade's second novel, Caveworld was released Pioneers Press via its literary imprint Punch Drunk Press following a UK, including a series of All Tomorrow's Parties festival dates, with the temporarily reunited Youthmovies. In January 2014, it was announced that his Do It Yourself Guide to Fighting the Big Motherf**kin' Sad was Powell's Books No. 1 bestseller in the small press section. 2014 saw the release of three new chapbooks, two new printings of Do It Yourself Guide to Fighting the Big Motherf**kin' Sad, and a month-long book tour.

In early 2015 Powell's Books small press section buyer Kevin Sampsell announced that Gnade's Do It Yourself Guide to Fighting the Big Motherf**kin' Sad was the store's small press bestseller for 2014, an honor it was awarded with in 2013 as well. Winter and spring 2015 a 5th printing of the aforementioned book as well as releases of the chapbook series My Brain Was A Shark Eating Itself volumes 1 to 6 (as well as an e-book edition) and the chapbook And in My Dreams You're Alive and You're Crying.

In January 2016 it was announced that Gnade's Do It Yourself Guide to Fighting the Big Motherfuckin' Sad was once again the small press bestseller at Powell's Books in 2015, this being the third year in a row at the No. 1 spot. A sixth printing of the book happened in mid-January.

In April 2016, Three One G and Pioneers Press issued his latest book, Locust House.

Powell's Books announced Gnade's Do-It-Yourself Guide to Fighting the Big Motherf**kin' Sad book was its #1 small bestseller in 2017.

In June 2019 it was announced that his next book, This is the End of Something But It's Not the End of You, would be released February 14, 2020 via Pioneers Press and Three One G.

Float Me Away, Floodwaters, a short novel, was released by Three One G and Bread & Roses Press on January 5, 2021.

During a West Coast tour in October 2022, Gnade announced his next book would be a novel entitled After Tonight, Everything Will Be Different. Its release date was January 5, 2022 via Three One G and Bread & Roses Press.

Gnade's novel, The Internet Newspaper, was released in February 2023 by Three One G and Bread & Roses Press and was followed by UK and US tours. His latest novel, I Wish to Say Lovely Things will be released in February 2024, again through Three One G and Bread & Roses Press. This publication is third in the "Home and Away Quartet" that also includes After Tonight, Everything Will Be Different and The Internet Newspaper.

The final installment in the "Home and Away Quartet," entitled Your Friends Will Carry You Home, was released in January 2025 by Bread & Roses Press and Three One G.

== Influences ==
Gnade has said in interviews and on his website that his music is influenced by Neutral Milk Hotel, Joanna Newsom, noise recordings, field recordings, and old country music. In interviews he has said that his writing is influenced by William Faulkner, Saul Bellow, James Joyce, Ernest Hemingway, and Roberto Bolano.

== Tour ==
Gnade tours regularly and generally plays solo or backed by a band. Recent tour-mates have included Youthmovies, Jonquil, Blood Red Shoes, Eugene McGuinness, Blanket, and House of Brothers. He has performed on bills and festivals (including Plan-it-X Fest and various ATP dates) with Calvin Johnson, Starf*****, Fuck Buttons, Angelo Spencer Sonic Youth's Thurston Moore and Lee Ranaldo, Godspeed! You Black Emperor, Television, Tortoise, Múm, Les Savy Fav, Pharmakon, Ghost Mice, Ramshackle Glory, Har Mar Superstar, Wolf Eyes, Dinosaur Jr., Scout Niblett, Castanets, Levon Helm, Dark Hills, Damon Moon and the Whispering Drifters, Under White Pines, Sydney Eloise, Alana Amram, Virgin Forest, The Album Leaf, George Pringle, Foals, and many others.

== Discography, Published Works ==
=== Full-Length Albums ===
- Run Hide Retreat Surrender (2005, Loud + Clear Records)
- We Are Ghosts and Bones Down Stone Walled Wells (2006 self-release, 2008 Lazy Acre, 2008 Red Red Sun Records)
- Trailerparks (2008, tour-only limited edition release, Try Harder Records, wide release June 2010 Punch Drunk Press)
- From Farmhouses to Tour Vans (2011, collection of rarities, Punch Drunk Press)

=== EPs ===
- Palaces/Whidbey Island (2007, limited edition double-EP/CD, Bad Drone Media 2007, Red Red Sun Records 2008)
- The Wild Homesick (2009, CD, cassette 2011, Punch Drunk Press)
- Shiv Shiv Shake (2010, tour-only reissue, Punch Drunk Press)
- AMERICANS (2013, Blessing Force, 2016 Three One G)
- Greater Mythology Blues (2016, Three One G)
- Life is the Meatgrinder that Sucks in All Things (2017, with Justin Pearson's Planet B, Three One G)
- Voicemails from the Great Satan (2018, with Demetrius Antuna, Three One G)

=== Split Albums and Collaborative Albums ===
- Adam Gnade and Ohioan (2006, Native Kin, limited edition split album with Ohioan)
- Wilderness and the Holy Gold (2006, BelowPDX, limited edition collaboration with Argumentix)
- Hello America! (2009, Punch Drunk Press, three-way split with Ohioan and COASTS)
- Honey Slides (2007, collaboration with Youthmovies Try Harder Records 2007 and Zankyo in Japan 2009)
- An Hour of Music with Adam Gnade and Megan Michelle (2012, Punch Drunk Press)

=== Singles ===
- "Prince of the Confederacy" (2006, split cassette release with Gang Wizard, DeathBombArc)
- Shout the Rafters Down! (2006, five-song digital EP single, Drowned in Sound's "Singles Club")
- 2 (two song single, 2006)

=== Cassettes ===
- Island's Islands (2009, limited edition cassette EP, Punch Drunk Press)
- Surrenderland: You Could Quit Your Jobs and Run Away Like You Used to, Back When You Did Things Just Because, and Because it Felt Good to Run Away, and Because You Didn’t Worry so Much Like You Do Now… just Because and Leave the A**holes Behind and F*** ‘em Anyway, They Don’t Mean *S*** (2010, cassette, Punch Drunk Press)
- Live on Simple Folk Radio (2010, Punch Drunk Press)
- Split cassette, side a The Wild Homesick EP by Adam Gnade. side b Upon Awakening EP by COASTS (2011, Punch Drunk Press)
- Split cassette, side a Adam Gnade (various live tracks), side b Megan Michelle (various selected tracks.) (2011, Punch Drunk Press)
- Split cassette, side a Adam Gnade (various tracks), side b Damon Moon and the Whispering Drifters (various tracks) (2011)
- Locust House Excerpt collaboration with Planet B (Three One G, 2016)

=== Compilations and Miscellaneous Appearances ===
- "Supper's Waiting on the Table" from Plan-it-X Fest 2016 Sampler
- "Look at What the Light Did Now" (Little Wings cover) from Happy Birthday, K Records (Asthmatic Kitty, digital)
- "Hymn California" from DiS is 6 (Drowned in Sound sixth anniversary compilation, LP)
- "Room for Three and the Bayou Summer" from We Made This, Portland
- "T'was the Night Before Christmas" from Another Grey Xmas
- "Snake Lore" from Loud News UK Magazine Compilation CD
- Various tracks from Bad Drone Media Sampler
- "Psalm" from Wood-Land Remixes
- Lead vocals on "Sad Trash" and Become an Island" from Youthmovies EP Polyp (Blast First Petite)
- Lead vocals on "Your Friends Will Carry You Home" from Faux-Hoax (members of Gang of Four, Modest Mouse, and Menomena) 7" (Polyvinyl)
- "Robbie and Lauren and the Silver Sunrise" (with Argumentix" from Sonic Couture 2007 (BelowPDX)
- "Prince of the Confederacy" from DeathBomb Arc Tape Club Year Two Sampler 3-CD
- "We're Sick It" from Invisible Children charity comp
- "You're Just a Skull on a Body, Baby" from Backlash Magazine Comp CD
- "Your Friends Will Carry You Home" (with Faux-Hoax) from Live from Nowhere Near You Vol 2 (Greyday Records)

=== Books, Chapbooks ===
- Seasons Loving Nothing (2007, limited-edition novella)
- Hymn California (2008, novel, Dutchmoney Books)
- The Darkness to the West (2008, novella, Punch Drunk Press)
- Hey hey Lonesome (2011, novella, Punch Drunk Press)
- The Heat and the Hot Earth (2011, novella, Punch Drunk Press)
- California (2011, hardback novella, Double Suns)
- They Will Stand On You and Spit (2012, split chapbook with writing by Adam Gnade and Bart Schaneman, Punch Drunk Press)
- The Growling Mouth (2012, novella, Punch Drunk Press)
- The Do-It-Yourself Guide to Fighting the Big Motherfuckin' Sad (2012, Pioneers Press)
- The Hard Fifty Farm (2013, split chapbook with Pioneers Press owner Jessie Duke, Punch Drunk Press)
- Caveworld (2013, novel, Pioneers Press / Punch Drunk Press)
- Simple Steps to a Life Less Sh*tty (2014, chapbook, Punch Drunk Press)
- Friends, Get Wayward (2014, chapbook, Punch Drunk Press)
- Ringside: A Companion Piece to the Do-It-Yourself Guide to Fighting the Big Motherf***ing Sad (2014, chapbook, Punch Press Press)
- My Brain was a Shark Eating, (e-book) (2016, Punch Press Press)
- And In My Dreams You're Alive and You're Crying (2015, chapbook, Punch Press Press)
- Locust House: A Novella (2016, Three One G, Pioneers Press)
- This Is the End of Something, But It's Not the End of You (2020 Three One G, Pioneers Press)
- Float Me Away, Floodwaters (2021, Three One G, Bread & Roses Press)
- After Tonight, Everything Will Be Different (2022, Three One G, Bread & Roses Press)
- The Internet Newspaper (2023, Three One G, Bread & Roses Press)
- I Wish to Say Lovely Things (2024, Three One G, Bread & Roses Press)
- Your Friends Will Carry You Home (2025, Three One G, Bread & Roses Press)
