= Media Lounge =

Audio-visual collective

Media Lounge is an audio-visual collective based in Sheffield and London. It comprises members Dave Holloway, Paul Huxley, Tim Parmee, Tom Rose, Paul (Power) Sherlock and Damien Wasylkiw.

The collective works closely with post-rock band 65daysofstatic and has produced music videos, DVDs and promotional items for them.

In 2006 Media Lounge toured with 65dos, Chris Clark, and the Mirimar Disaster, providing live visuals and a live AV set.

They have also worked with Roots Manuva, Death from Above 1979 and Feedle.

== 65dos / Media Lounge discography ==
- Thrash Waltz (music video)
- Retreat! Retreat! (music video)
- AOD (live) (music video)
- Radio Protector (music video)
- Drove Through Ghosts to Get Here (music video)
- Tour Nice Kids (documentary)
- Volume 3: The Kids Have Eyes (DVD)
- Don't Go Down to Sorrow (music video)
