= Hole (EP) =

Hole EP

EP by 65daysofstatic
- Released: 14 March 2005
- Genre: Post-rock
- Length: 24:31
- Label: Monotreme Records

65daysofstatic chronology
The Fall of Math (2004)	Hole EP (2005)	One Time for All Time (2005)

Professional ratings
Review scores
Source	Rating
Allmusic	link
Drowned in Sound	(8/10) link

Hole is an EP by British post-rock band 65daysofstatic, released on 14 March 2005 on Monotreme Records. The title track is taken from their album The Fall of Math.

== Track listing ==
1. "Hole" – 4:34
2. "Wrong Side of the Tracks" – 1:14
3. "The Fall of Math" (65dos Remix) – 4:06
4. "Betraying Chino" – 2:11
5. "No Station" – 2:11
6. "Retreat! Retreat!" (mothboy Remix) – 5:16
7. "4Connection" – 4:54

This EP also contains the video for "Retreat! Retreat!".
