= Kristian Williams =

American anarchist author (born 1974)

Kristian Williams (born 1974) is an American anarchist author. Williams served on the board of the Institute for Anarchist Studies.

== Publications ==
- Williams, Kristian. Our Enemies in Blue: Police and Power in America. Brooklyn, NY: Soft Skull Press, 2004.
- Williams, Kristian. American Methods: Torture and the Logic of Domination. Cambridge, Mass: South End Press, 2006, ISBN 978-0-89608-753-8.
- Williams, Kristian, scott crow. Witness To Betrayal/Profiles of Provocateurs. AK Press / Emergency Hearts Press. 2015, ISBN 978-1-93920-212-3
- Williams, Kristian, William Munger, and Lara Messersmith-Glavin. Life During Wartime: Resisting Counterinsurgency. Oakland, CA : AK Press, 2013.
- Williams, Kristian, and Adam Gnade. Hurt: Notes on Torture in a Modern Democracy. Microcosm Publishing, 2012, ISBN 1-93462-064-5
- Williams, Kristian. Resist Everything Except Temptation: The Anarchist Philosophy of Oscar Wilde. AK Press, 2020, ISBN 978-1-84935-320-5
- Williams, Kristian. Gang Politics: Revolution, Repression, and Crime. AK Press, 2022, ISBN 978-1-84935-456-1

== See also ==
- Invention of police
