= We Were Exploding Anyway =

Studio album by 65daysofstatic
- Released: 26 April 2010
- Genre: Electronica, instrumental rock, dance music, post-rock
- Length: 57:07
- Label: Hassle Records

65daysofstatic chronology
The Destruction of Small Ideas (2007)	We Were Exploding Anyway (2010)	Heavy Sky (EP) (2010)

Singles from We Were Exploding Anyway
- 1. "Weak4 (Japan only)" Released: 18 March 2010; 2. "Crash Tactics" Released: 30 March 2010; 3. "Weak4/Come To Me" Released: 7 October 2010

Professional ratings
Review scores
Source	Rating
Addict Music	4.5/5 stars
BBC Music	(favourable)
Drowned in Sound	8/10 stars
Rockmidgets	5/5 stars
Rock Sound	8/10 stars
Strange Glue	9/10 stars

We Were Exploding Anyway is the fourth studio album by 65daysofstatic. It was recorded in Sheffield, while mixing and mastering took place in New York. It was released on 26 April 2010 in Europe and the United States, and on 19 May in Japan. It was their first album to be released on Hassle Records. The two singles, "Weak4" and "Crash Tactics", were released on 18 and 30 March respectively. To promote the release of their album, the band organized a headlining European tour with the bands Nedry and Loops Haunt; beginning in the Netherlands and ending in Ireland, they have also hinted towards a future U.S. tour. The album was made available as a live stream on the band's Myspace page on the 19 April, one week ahead of its release. The album debuted at number 99 in the UK Albums Chart and number 7 in the UK independent albums chart.

Musically, We Were Exploding Anyway has a stronger electronic sound, featuring more dance beats, electronic bass and drum tracks, and less complex guitar-driven patterns that distances the album from the band's earlier math rock/post-rock elements. In a review by The Line of Best Fit, "...[the album] also sees them seemingly desperate to rid themselves of their characterless post-rock moniker as they delve well and truly into the more rhythmic qualities of dance music.".

The song "Debutante" was used for the E3 2014 trailer for the video game No Man's Sky.

== Track listing ==
1. "Mountainhead" – 5:33
2. "Crash Tactics" – 3:47
3. "Dance Dance Dance" – 4:02
4. "Piano Fights" – 3:51
5. "Weak4" – 3:54
6. "Come to Me" (featuring Robert Smith of The Cure) – 8:00
7. "Go Complex" – 4:04
8. "Debutante" – 7:21
9. "Tiger Girl" – 10:37
10. "Sawtooth Rising" (Japanese Bonus Track) - 4:58
