= Zack Sabre Jr. =

British professional wrestler (born 1987)

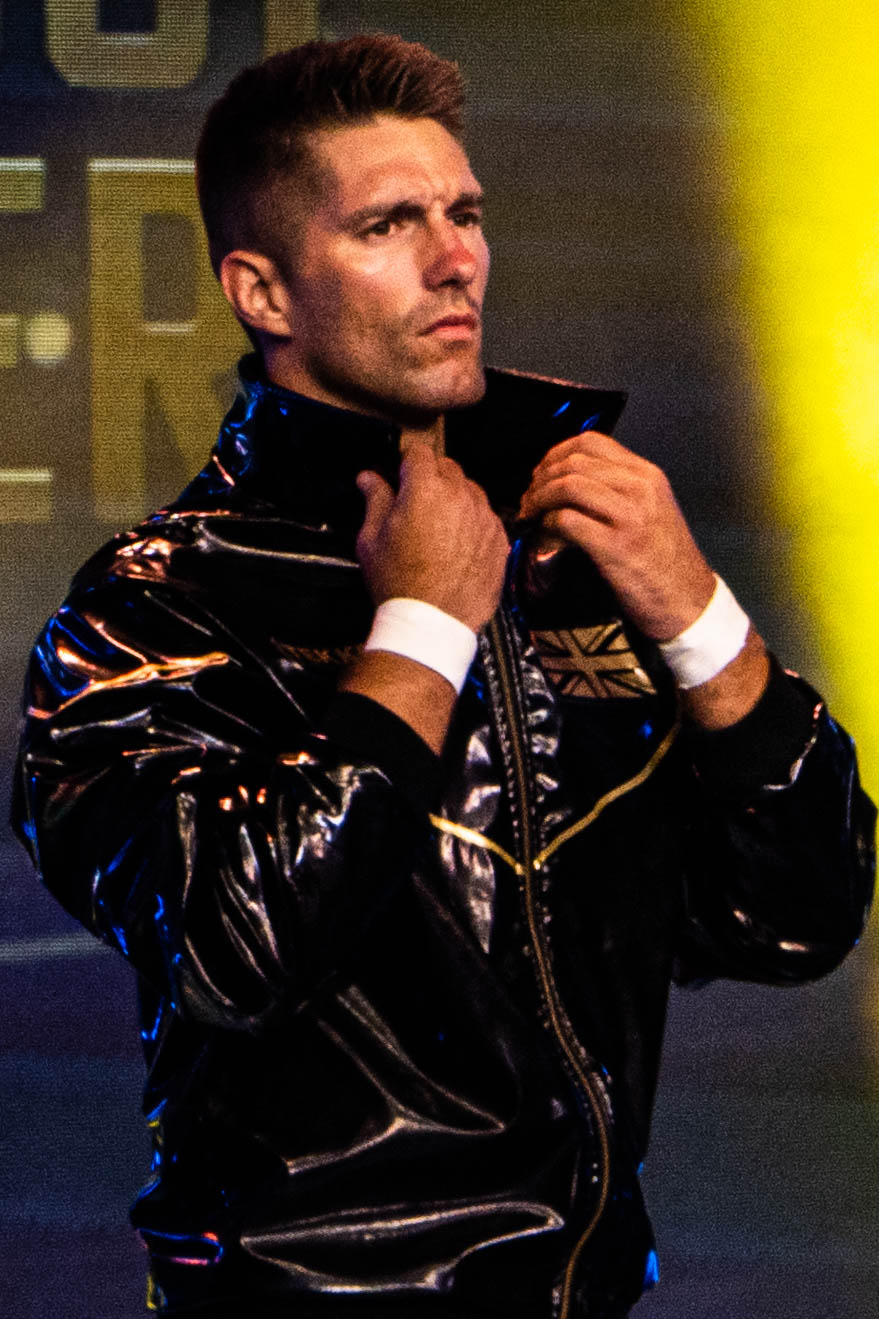
- Sabre in 2022

Personal information
- Born: Luke James Uggles Eatwell; 24 July 1987 (age 39) Isle of Sheppey, England

Professional wrestling career
- Ring name: Zack Sabre Jr.
- Billed height: 6 ft 1 in (1.85 m)
- Billed weight: 211 lb (96 kg)
- Billed from: The Isle of Sheppey in Kent, England
- Trained by: Andre Baker; Chris Hero; Taka Michinoku; Yoshinari Ogawa; Jon Ryan
- Debut: 20 April 2004

Lucas James Uggles Eatwell (born 24 July 1987), known by his ring name Zack Sabre Jr. (Japanese: ザック・セイバーJr., Hepburn: Zakku Seibā Junia) and its abbreviated form ZSJ, is an English professional wrestler. He is signed to New Japan Pro-Wrestling (NJPW), where he is the second and current leader of The Mighty Don't Kneel (TMDK) stable. He also performs in Consejo Mundial de Lucha Libre (CMLL), where he is the current CMLL World Heavyweight Champion in his first reign.

Sabre is a former NWA United Kingdom Junior Heavyweight Champion and a product of the NWA UK Hammerlock training school. He started training at the age of 14 and later trained in the Pro Wrestling Noah (NOAH) Dojo under Yoshinari Ogawa and Naomichi Marufuji as a member of their roster from 2011 until November 2015. He joined Suzuki-gun in 2017, after defeating Katsuyori Shibata in his NJPW debut match for the RevPro British Heavyweight Championship. Outside NJPW, Sabre performs for British promotion Revolution Pro Wrestling (RevPro), as part of NJPW's partnership with the promotion. He has also notably wrestled for Pro Wrestling Guerrilla (PWG), Progress Wrestling, and the World Wrestling Network (WWNLive) and their brands EVOLVE and Full Impact Pro.

Though primarily known for his solo performances, Sabre is also a prolific tag team wrestler. In his early career, he made a name for himself as part of the "Leaders of the New School" with Marty Scurll, holding the IPW:UK Tag Team Championship twice. He would later win the same title (now called RPW Undisputed British Tag Team Championship) alongside Suzuki-gun stablemate Minoru Suzuki. In Pro Wrestling Noah, he was a two-time GHC Junior Heavyweight Tag Team Champion with Yoshinari Ogawa and, in Westside Xtreme Wrestling (wXw), a wXw World Tag Team Champion with Walter. Sabre had also formed a tag team with other Suzuki-gun stablemate Taichi ("Dangerous Tekkers"), who were three time IWGP Tag Team Champions; following the Suzuki-gun disbandment, the team disbanded along with it. After Suzuki-gun's disbandment, he became the second leader of TMDK, where he would become the inaugural and overall two-time NJPW World Television Championship; with his first reign being the longest in the title's history, a two-time IWGP Heavyweight Champion, a one-time NEVER Openweight 6-Man Tag Team Champion, and the winner of the 34th G1 Climax tournament, the second gaijin wrestler to win the tournament.

Sabre's offensive style includes a wide array of intricately complex technical wrestling holds and pinning combinations, strikes, athleticism and acrobatics. The readers of the Wrestling Observer Newsletter voted Sabre the Best Technical Wrestler of the year for seven consecutive years (2014–2020), and he was voted Best Technical Wrestler of the Decade (2010s).

== Early life ==
Luke James Uggles Eatwell was born on the Isle of Sheppey on 24 July 1987. He was raised in Sheerness.

== Professional wrestling career ==
=== NWA UK Hammerlock (2004–2008) ===
Sabre made his wrestling debut on 20 April 2004. On 22 October 2005, Sabre won the NWA United Kingdom Junior Heavyweight Championship and held the title until 1 June 2008 when it was vacated.

=== International Pro Wrestling: United Kingdom (2006–2012) ===
At International Pro Wrestling: United Kingdom (IPW:UK), Sabre most notably won the IPW:UK Tag Team Championship twice along with Marty Scurll in 2009 and 2010.

=== Pro Wrestling Noah (2008–2015) ===
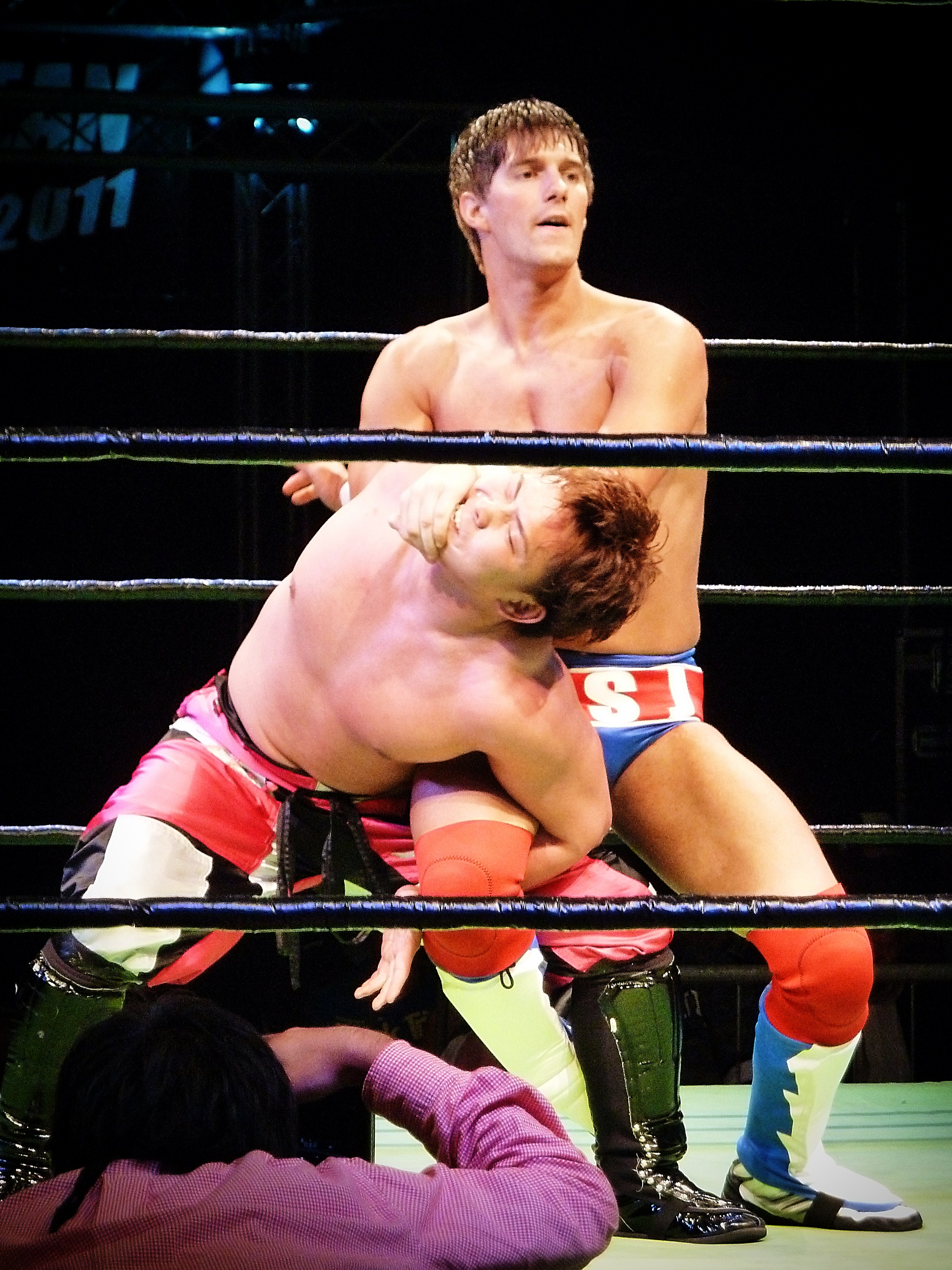
Sabre wrestling Katsuhiko Nakajima at Pro Wrestling Noah's European Navigation in May 2011, before he officially joined Pro Wrestling Noah's roster later that year

At Pro Wrestling Noah (Noah), Sabre most notably won the GHC Junior Heavyweight Tag Team Championship twice with Yoshinari Ogawa in 2013 and 2014.

=== Westside Xtreme Wrestling (2006–2018) ===
At Westside Xtreme Wrestling (wXw), Sabre won both the wXw World Lightweight Championship and the wXw World Heavyweight Championship in 2010 unifying the titles to become the inaugural wXw Unified World Wrestling Champion. He lost the championship in the same year to Big van Walter. Sabre also won the 2015 World Tag Team Tournament for the vacant wXw World Tag Team Championship together with Walter.

=== Insane Championship Wrestling (2011, 2016) ===
Sabre made two appearances for Glasgow's Insane Championship Wrestling promotion. At their premiere annual event ICW: Fear & Loathing 4 on 23 October 2011, Sabre entered an elimination triple threat match with Liam Thomson and his former trainee Andy Wild, which was won by Wild.

=== Progress Wrestling (2012–2018) ===
Sabre facing Marty Scurll, his former tag team partner, in January 2017 at Revolution Pro Wrestling's High Stakes event

In 2015, Sabre took part in the first ever Progress Wrestling Super Strong Style 16 tournament, competing in four matches over the weekend – defeating Zack Gibson, Tommaso Ciampa and Scurll before losing to Will Ospreay in the final. Sabre had a rematch with Ciampa in November at the first ever Manchester Progress show, which Ciampa won. In March 2016, Sabre and Ciampa teamed up to face The Origin (El Ligero and Nathan Cruz) for the Progress Tag Team Championships but failed to capture the titles. Following the loss, Ciampa beat down Sabre. The two faced each other at Progress' biggest show to date, held at the Brixton Academy in London, in a Two Out of Three falls match which Sabre won.

At Chapter 40, Sabre unsuccessfully challenged Pete Dunne for the Progress World Championship. He then entered the Super Strong Style 16 defeating David Starr in the first round and Jack Sexsmith in the second round, before losing to Travis Banks in the semi-final. Sabre entered the Super Strong Style 16 2018, defeating Chuck Mambo in the first round, Starr in the second round, Keith Lee in the semi-final and Kassius Ohno in the final, thus winning the tournament for the first time in his career. At Chapter 77, Sabre was defeated by Walter, his former wXw tag team partner, for the Progress World Championship.

=== Pro Wrestling Guerrilla (2014–2018) ===
Sabre made his debut for Pro Wrestling Guerrilla (PWG) at the 2014 Battle of Los Angeles on night 1 teaming with Chuck Taylor and Kenny Omega and defeating Adam Cole and The Young Bucks (Matt and Nick Jackson).

In April 2015, he returned to the promotion, answering the challenge from PWG World Champion Roderick Strong in a title match at Don't Sweat the Technique in a losing effort. He then entered the 2015 Battle of Los Angeles which he eventually won.

On Night 2 of All Star Weekend 12, Sabre defeated Strong to win the PWG title for the first time. He entered his third Battle of Los Angeles tournament in September 2016, losing to Will Ospreay in the quarterfinals. On 7 July 2017, Sabre lost the PWG World Championship to Chuck Taylor. In September, Sabre entered the 2017 Battle of Los Angeles tournament, where he was eliminated by Rey Fenix in the quarter-finals.

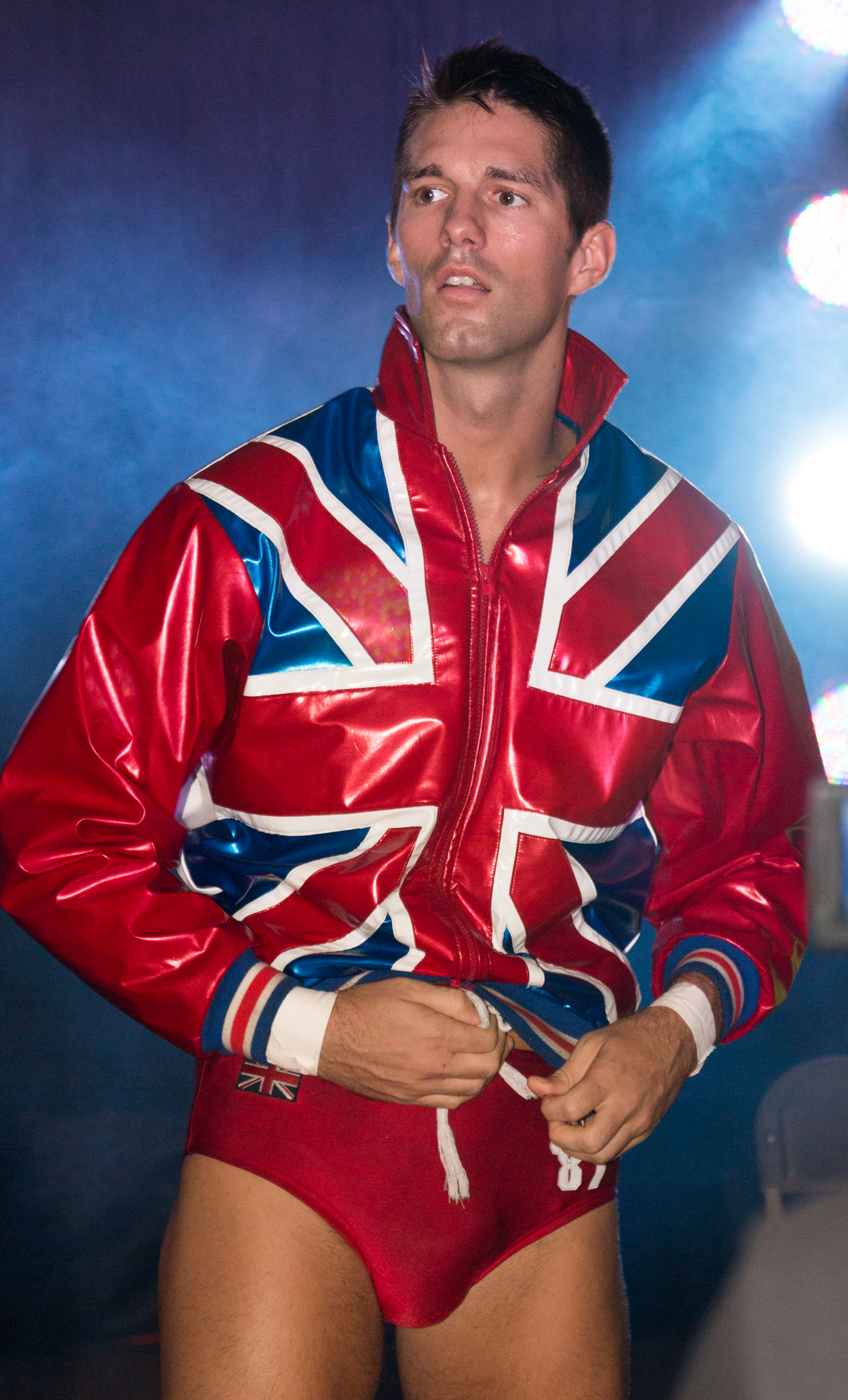
Sabre in 2016

=== WWE (2016) ===
On 31 March 2016, Sabre was announced as a participant in WWE's upcoming Global Cruiserweight Series tournament, which was later renamed the "Cruiserweight Classic". His name was taken down shortly after as he would have a qualifying match at Progress Wrestling's Chapter 29 event in London to earn his spot, where he defeated Flash Morgan Webster. On 23 June, Sabre defeated Tyson Dux in his first round match. On 14 July, Sabre defeated Drew Gulak in his second round match. On 26 August, Sabre defeated Noam Dar to advance to the semifinals of the tournament, where he was defeated on 14 September by Gran Metalik. Afterwards, it was reported that Sabre's loss was due to him not agreeing to a contract with WWE unlike the two tournament finalists. He later revealed he turned down the WWE contract to sign for New Japan Pro Wrestling instead.

=== New Japan Pro-Wrestling (2017–present) ===
==== Suzuki-gun (2017–2022) ====
On 21 February 2017, it was announced that Sabre would be making his debut for New Japan Pro-Wrestling (NJPW) at the promotion's 45th anniversary show on 6 March, where he would challenge Katsuyori Shibata for the RPW British Heavyweight Championship. Sabre won the match with help from Minoru Suzuki and Davey Boy Smith Jr., joining the Suzuki-gun stable in the process. The following day, Sabre pinned NEVER Openweight Champion Hirooki Goto in an eight-man tag team match. This led to Sabre unsuccessfully challenging Goto for the title on 9 April at Sakura Genesis. Sabre was left out of the 2017 Best of the Super Juniors as NJPW had decided to categorise him as a heavyweight wrestler going forward. Instead, he was announced for NJPW's premier singles tournament, the 2017 G1 Climax. Prior to the G1 Climax, Sabre took part in a tournament to crown the inaugural IWGP United States Heavyweight Championship at G1 Special in USA, where he made it to the semifinals, before losing to Tomohiro Ishii. On 17 July, Sabre scored a major win in his first G1 Climax match by submitting the reigning IWGP Intercontinental Champion Hiroshi Tanahashi. Sabre went on to finish the tournament with a record of five wins and four losses, failing to advance to the finals. On 16 September at Destruction in Hiroshima, Sabre failed in his attempt to capture the Intercontinental Championship from Tanahashi.

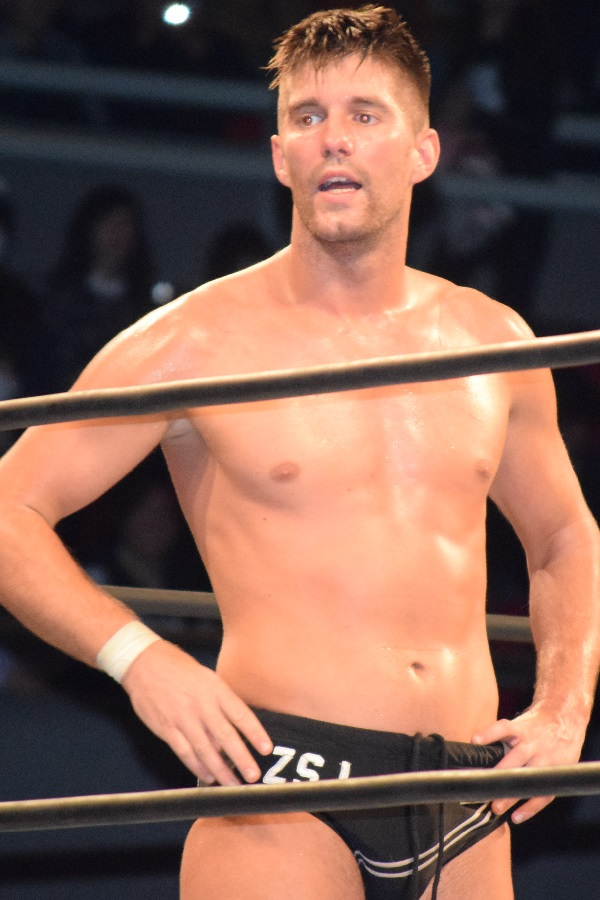
Sabre in March 2018

On 28 February 2018, Sabre was announced as one of the competitors in the 2018 New Japan Cup. Sabre defeated Tetsuya Naito in the first round, Kota Ibushi in the second round and Sanada in the semi-finals, on his way to the final. On 21 March, Sabre defeated Tanahashi in the final, becoming the second gaijin to win the tournament after Giant Bernard in 2006. After the match, he challenged IWGP Heavyweight Champion Kazuchika Okada for a title shot at Sakura Genesis on 1 April. At the event, Okada defeated Sabre to retain the title. Sabre competed in the 2018 G1 Climax where he finished with 12 points, failing to advance due to his losses against Ibushi and Kenny Omega.

At Wrestle Kingdom 13, he defeated Ishii to regain the British Heavyweight Championship. In March 2019, Sabre entered to the 2019 New Japan Cup, defeating Evil in the first round, Ibushi in the second round but losing to Tanahashi in the quarter-final. At G1 Supercard, Sabre defeated Tanahashi to retain the British Heavyweight Championship. Sabre was announced as a participant of the 2019 G1 Climax. He walked away with 8 points after winning four matches, beating Bad Luck Fale, Will Ospreay, fellow Suzuki-gun stablemate Lance Archer, and Kenta, whilst suffering losses to Okada, Sanada, Tanahashi, Ibushi, and Evil. At Royal Quest, Sabre lost the British Heavyweight Championship to Tanahashi. At Destruction in Beppu, Sabre pinned Tanahashi to regain the British Heavyweight Championship for the fourth time.

After retaining against Sanada at Wrestle Kingdom 14, and Ospreay at The New Beginning in Sapporo, Sabre lost the title to Ospreay on 14 February at an RPW event. Afterwards, he began teaming up with fellow Suzuki-gun stablemate Taichi in pursuit of the IWGP Tag Team Championship, held by Ibushi and Tanahashi. In the 2020 New Japan Cup, Sabre was eliminated in the first round by Ibushi. His partner Taichi, however, eliminated both Tanahashi and Ibushi from the tournament before being eliminated himself by Sanada. On 12 July, at Dominion, Sabre and Taichi defeated Tanahashi and Ibushi to win their tag titles, marking Sabre's first title win in NJPW. They retained the championship in a match against the former champions at Summer Struggle in Jingu. After one more successful defense, they lost the titles to G.O.D. at Wrestle Kingdom 15. However, on 1 June he and Taichi regained the IWGP Tag Team Championship. They would lose them to World Tag League winners Hirooki Goto and Yoshi-Hashi at Wrestle Kingdom 16 Night 1. On Night 2, Suzuki-gun lost to Los Ingobernables de Japon, in an 8-man tag team match. On Night 3, Sabre and fellow Suzuki-gun stablemate Yoshinobu Kanemaru lost to Pro Wrestling Noah's Naomichi Marufuji and Yoshinari Ogawa.

In March, Sabre participated in the New Japan Cup, he defeated Ryohei Oiwa in the first round and fellow Suzuki-gun stablemate Douki in the second round. He defeated Great-O-Khan in round 3 and Ospreay in the quarter-finals. Sabre then defeated Shingo Takagi in the semi-finals to advance to the finals, where he defeated Naito in the tournament finals, to win his second New Japan Cup. Due to winning the tournament, Sabre earned an IWGP World Heavyweight Championship match. At Hyper Battle, Sabre lost to Okada.

At Dominion 6.12 in Osaka-jo Hall, Sabre teamed with Kanemaru and El Desperado to challenge for the NEVER Openweight 6-Man Tag Team Championship in a losing effort to House of Torture. Also at the event, Sabre was announced to be competing in the G1 Climax 32 tournament in June, as a part of the C Block. In the tournament, Sabre finished with 8 points, with only a loss to Naito on the final day, costing him a spot in the semi-finals.

In October, Sabre competed in a tournament to crown the inaugural NJPW World Television Champion. He defeated Alex Zayne in the first round and David Finlay in the second round. The following month, Sabre defeated Evil to advance to the tournament finals, facing Ren Narita at Wrestle Kingdom 17.

In December, at the World Tag League and Best of the Super Juniors finals, Suzuki announced the disbandment of Suzuki-gun by the end of the year. The final match between the faction took place on 23 December, where the team of Taichi, Sabre, Kanemaru and Douki defeated Suzuki, Archer, Desperado and Taka Michinoku. After the match, each of the Suzuki-gun members spoke about their memories as a part of the group and thanked leader Suzuki. The night ended with all members posing with the Suzuki-gun flag, only to be interrupted by former member Takashi Iizuka, causing all nine men to pose in the ring, behind the Suzuki-gun flag, which was raised by Michinoku.

==== The Mighty Don't Kneel (2023–present) ====
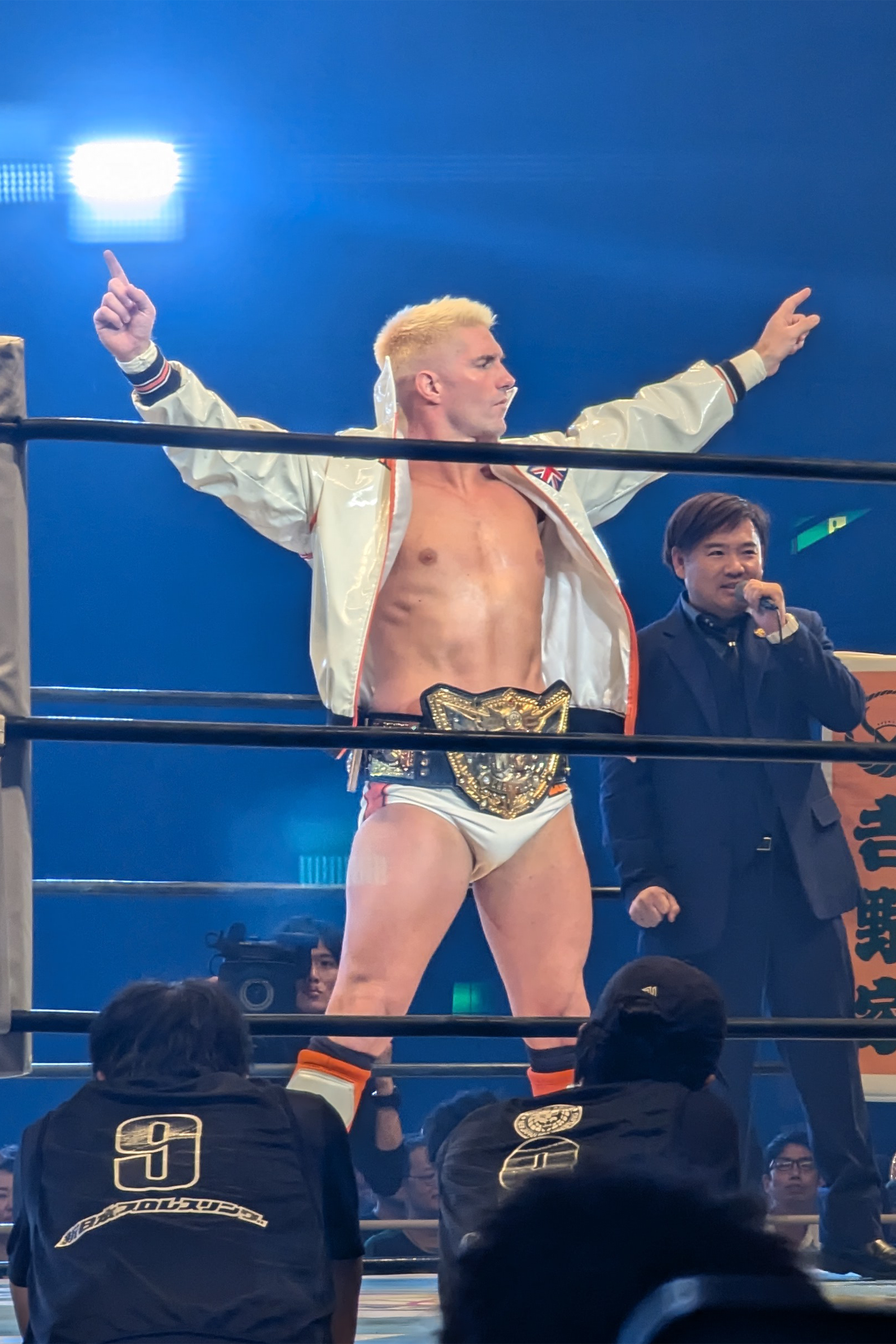
Sabre as the IWGP World Heavyweight Champion in November 2024

At Wrestle Kingdom 17, Sabre defeated Ren Narita to become the inaugural NJPW World Television Champion. After the match, Sabre was approached by Mikey Nicholls and Shane Haste, who offered him a TMDK t-shirt. Sabre accepted the shirt and embraced the two men, joining the stable. Since Sabre was being friendly towards young lion Kosei Fujita, he too joined the stable the next day by the request of Sabre. He made his first title defence, successfully defeating Tomohiro Ishii in February. On 18 February, at Battle in the Valley, Sabre made his first title defence in the United States, defeating Clark Connors to retain the title once again. In March, Sabre took part in the New Japan Cup, where he was eliminated in the second round to Shota Umino. This led to a rematch on 8 April at Sakura Genesis, where Sabre defeated Umino to make his fourth successful title defense. Seven days later, at Capital Collision, Sabre made his fifth title defense against Tom Lawlor. On 3 May at Wrestling Dontaku, Sabre faced Jeff Cobb in a time limit draw, successfully defending his title for the sixth time. Due to his match against Cobb finishing in a draw, on 4 June at Dominion 6.4 in Osaka-jo Hall, Sabre defeated Cobb in a rematch to make his tenth title defense.

In July, Sabre entered the G1 Climax tournament, where he would compete in the D Block. Sabre finished joint top of his block with 10 points, allowing him to advance to the quarterfinal round. In the quarterfinal round, Sabre lost to Kazuchika Okada, eliminating him from the tournament.

On 14 October at Royal Quest III, Sabre challenged Will Ospreay for the IWGP United Kingdom Heavyweight Championship, which Ospreay had rebranded from the IWGP United States Heavyweight Championship. At the event, Sabre was defeated by Ospreay, failing to win the title. The following month at Power Struggle, Sabre teamed with TMDK stablemates, Nicholls and Haste, challenging Okada, Ishii and Hiroshi Tanahashi for the NEVER Openweight 6-Man Tag Team Championship, but they were defeated. A few days later at Lonestar Shootout, Sabre defeated Mike Bailey to retain his World Television title. After the match, Sabre challenged Tanahashi to a World Television Championship match at Wrestle Kingdom 18, which was later accepted by Tanahashi and made official for the event. Two days before the event, Sabre returned to Pro Wrestling Noah, at their Noah The New Year 2024 event, teaming with Yoshinari Ogawa to defeat Hayata and Tanahashi. On 4 January at Wrestle Kingdom, Sabre lost the World Television Championship to Tanahashi, ending his reign at 365 days.

The following day at New Year Dash!!, TMDK faced Bryan Danielson, Jon Moxley, Okada and Ishii in a winning effort. Afterwards, Sabre challenged Danielson to a rematch, after Danielson had previously defeated him at AEW's WrestleDream on 1 October 2023 by knockout blow, leading Sabre to maintain that Danielson was unable to tap him out and he was the best technical wrestler in the world. Sabre defeated Danielson, on 11 February at The New Beginning in Osaka. On 12 April at Windy City Riot, Sabre defeated Matt Riddle to regain the World Television Championship for the second time. On 3 May at Wrestling Dontaku, Sabre lost the championship to Cobb, ending his second reign at 21 days. Sabre would enter the 2024 G1 Climax, winning seven of his nine A Block matches and ending as the top seed for that block. He would defeat Shingo Takagi in the semi-finals on 17 August, and then Yota Tsuji in the finals on 18 August, to win the tournament for the first time. He also became the second gaijin to win the tournament after Kenny Omega in 2016. Following his win, he would announce his plans to challenge for the IWGP World Heavyweight Championship on 14 October at King of Pro-Wrestling rather than at Wrestle Kingdom, and he successfully did so by defeating Tetsuya Naito for the title. On 4 November at Power Struggle, he successfully defended the title against Takagi.

On 4 January 2025, at Wrestle Kingdom 19, Sabre successfully defended the title against Shota Umino in the main event. The next night at Wrestle Dynasty, he successfully defended it again against Ricochet. On 11 February at The New Beginning in Osaka, Sabre lost the title to Hirooki Goto, ending his reign at 120 days. At Tanahashi Jam on June 29, Sabre regained the title by defeating Goto by referee's decision. From July 19 and August 13, Sabre took part in the 2025 G1 Climax, where he won his block with a record of six wins and two losses, advancing to the semifinals of the tournament. On August 16, Sabre was defeated by eventual tournament winner Konosuke Takeshita in the semifinals. He would lose the title to Takeshita at King of Pro-Wrestling on October 13, ending his second reign at 106 days. For the 2025 World Tag League, Sabre teamed with Ryohei Oiwa, where they were placed in A-Block and scored 8 points. They were able to advance to the playoff stage, defeating the reigining Bishamon (Hirooki Goto and Yoshi-Hashi) in the semi-finals, and Yota Tsuji and Gabe Kidd in the grand finals, winning the WTL and earning an IWGP Tag Team Championship match.

On January 5, 2026 at Wrestle Kingdom 20, Sabe, Oiwa, and Hartley Jackson won a Ranbo to win the NEVER Openweight 6-Man Tag Team Championship. The following night at New Year Dash!!, Sabre and Oiwa unsuccessfully challenged Knock Out Brothers (Oskar and Yuto-Ice) for the IWGP Tag Team Championship. On Januiary 19, TMDK lost their titles to Bishamon-tin (Boltin Oleg, Hirooki Goto and Yoshi-Hashi). In March 2026, Sabre competed in the New Japan Cup and made it to the quarterfinals, where he was eliminated by Shota Umino. On April 4 at Sakura Genesis, Sabre and Oiwa failed to defeat Knock Out Brothers (Oskar and Yuto-Ice) for the IWGP Tag Team Championship.

=== Ring of Honor (2018–2019, 2023) ===
On 5 November 2018, it was announced that Sabre would make his Ring of Honor (ROH) debut at Final Battle. He defeated Jonathan Gresham.

Sabre returned to ROH on 25 February 2023, on the first episode of Ring of Honor, since Tony Khan's purchase of the company. At the event, he successfully defended the NJPW World Television Championship against Blake Christian. Sabre returned on 18 May, defending his title once more against AR Fox. After the match Sabre claimed to be the best television champion in all of professional wrestling, causing the ROH World Television Champion, Samoa Joe to confront Sabre. As Joe questioned Sabre's earlier statement, Christopher Daniels and Matt Sydal interrupted the duo, as Sydal sought a title shot at either the television championship. Sabre proposed a tag-team match between himself and Joe and Sydal and Daniels, where if the latter won, Sydal would earn a title future television title shot. The following week, Sabre and Samoa Joe defeated Sydal and Daniels. On 1 June, Sabre defeated Rocky Romero to retain his NJPW World Television Championship.

=== All Elite Wrestling (2022–present) ===
Since the announcement of Forbidden Door, Sabre had consistently called out "The American Dragon", hinting to challenging Bryan Danielson to a match at Forbidden Door. This led to, on the 22 June episode of Dynamite, Danielson acknowledging Sabre's challenge, however he also announced that he was injured and not medically cleared to compete at Forbidden Door, due to his loss at Double or Nothing in the Anarchy in the Arena match. However, Danielson announced a mystery opponent for Sabre, who he claimed was the "one person" he trusted to take his place at the PPV and at the subsequent special episode of Dynamite, AEW Blood and Guts. This led to Sabre, making his AEW debut by staring down Danielson. On 26 June at the event, the mystery opponent was revealed to be Claudio Castagnoli, who defeated Sabre.

Sabre made his televised AEW return on the 2 June 2023 episode of Rampage, defeating Action Andretti to retain his NJPW World Television Championship. Due to being called out by Orange Cassidy, Sabre attempted to get a match for Cassidy's AEW International Championship. On the 21 June episode of Dynamite, Sabre teamed with Daniel Garcia to defeat Cassidy and Katsuyori Shibata, after which a four-way match was set up for the upcoming Forbidden Door PPV. At the event, Cassidy retained his championship. On the 9 September episode of Collision, Danielson said that with his career winding down, the next person he wanted to face was Sabre. Later, a match between the two was officially announced for AEW WrestleDream. At the event, Sabre was defeated by Danielson.

On the 8 June 2024 episode of Collision, Sabre would release a video challenging Cassidy to a match at Forbidden Door, citing unfinished business from the four-way match the year prior. At the event, Sabre would defeat Cassidy. On 25 August, at All In, Sabre was a surprise entrant in the Casino Gauntlet match.

== Personal life ==
Eatwell became a vegan in 2015. In 2020, he revealed that he had obtained permanent residency in Japan during the COVID-19 pandemic and was learning Japanese.

Eatwell's political views are well known. He is an outspoken socialist who discussed his support of the Labour Party in 2019, and is a vocal opponent of the Conservative Party. Following the news that child poverty in the UK had reached record highs under the Conservatives in 2019, he began selling a custom anti-Conservative shirt with a percentage of the profits going to The Trussell Trust. After he was eliminated from the 2019 G1 Climax, he performed an in-character rant in which he blamed his loss on being distracted by the news that the next UK Prime Minister would be Boris Johnson, whom he called "Boris toffing Eaton [sic] wanker Johnson". During his entrance at Wrestle Kingdom 17 in 2023, he addressed Prime Minister Rishi Sunak and the ongoing healthcare worker strikes by shouting into the camera, "Rishi Sunak! Pay nurses, dickhead! Pay nurses a living wage!"

== Professional wrestling style and persona ==
Sabre's technical style is based on World of Sport wrestling, with plentiful chain wrestling and submissions. He has cited Bret Hart, Koji Kanemoto, Johnny Kidd, Shinjiro Otani, Jushin Liger and Johnny Saint as inspirations for his wrestling style. He has won the Wrestling Observer Newsletter Bryan Danielson Award (Best Technical Wrestler) for seven consecutive years. Sabre has been the leader of the TMDK faction since 4 January 2023.

Several of his signature maneuvers, mainly submission holds, are named in reference to musicians or material by musicians. Examples include Hurrah! Another Year, Surely This One Will Be Better Than the Last; The Inexorable March of Progress Will Lead Us All to Happiness (2004) by Youthmovies for a variant of the octopus stretch, Selected Technical Works Vol.2, a reference to the Aphex Twin album Selected Ambient Works Volume II (1994), for a deathlock-choke combo, and Yes! I Am a Long Way from Home (1997) by Mogwai for a deathlock-octopus hold combination. Other examples include HyperNormalisation, a reference to the documentary of the same name, for a inverted surfboard variant, and Orienteering with Napalm Death, a modified Banana Split, being a reference to a stand-up skit on Stewart Lee's Comedy Vehicle (2009).

== Championships and accomplishments ==
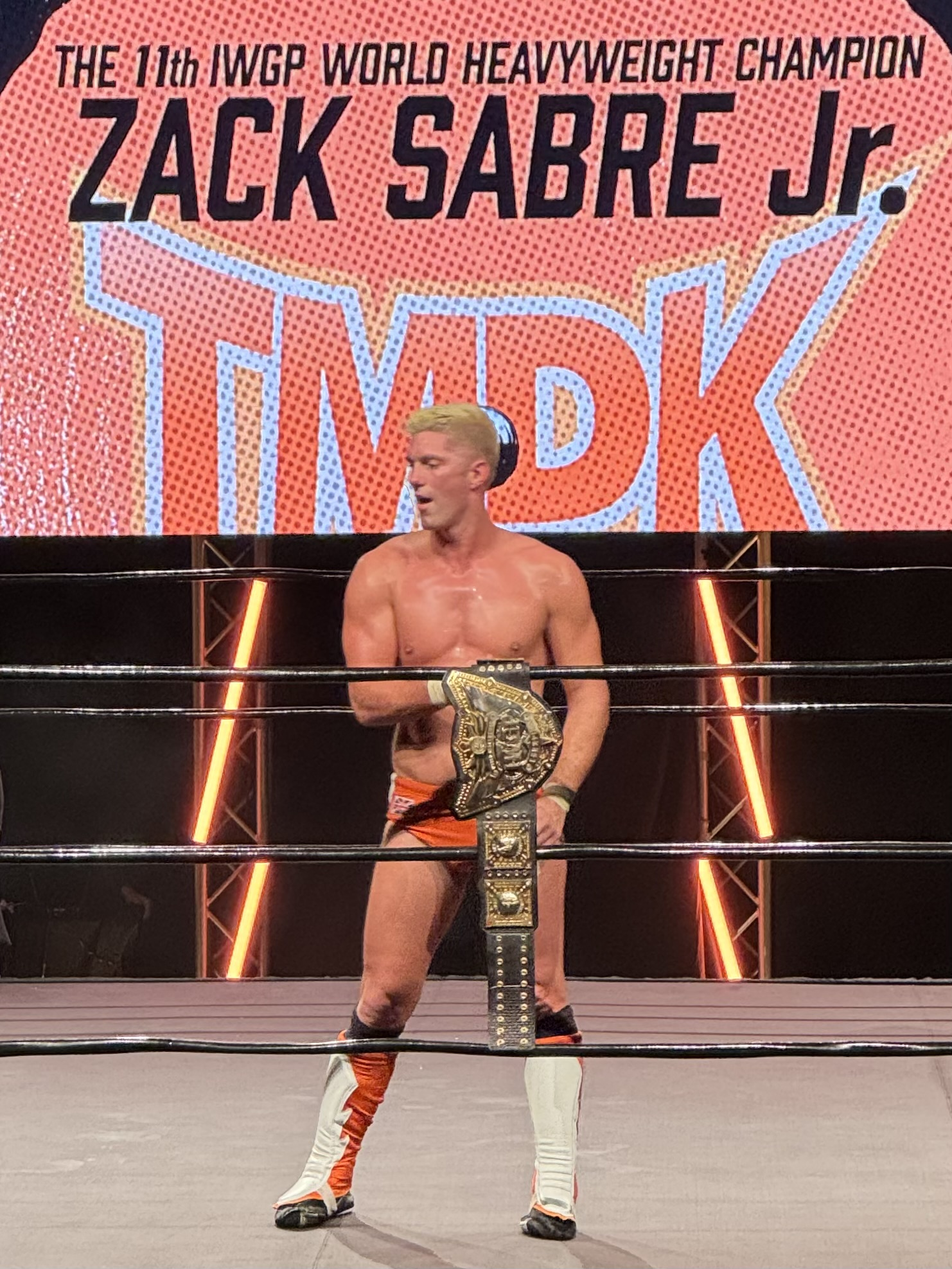
In NJPW, Sabre is a two-time and former IWGP Heavyweight Champion...

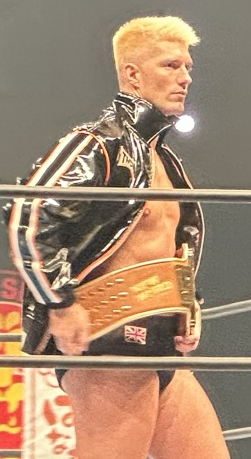
... and a two-time and inaugural NJPW World Television Champion.

- Alternative Wrestling Magazine
  - UK Match of the Year (2012) vs. Marty Scurll on 25 March
- A-Merchandise Wrestling
  - One Night Tournament (2008)
- Consejo Mundial de Lucha Libre
  - CMLL World Heavyweight Championship (1 time, current)
- DDT Pro-Wrestling
  - Ironman Heavymetalweight Championship (1 time)
- Defiant Wrestling/What Culture Pro Wrestling
  - Defiant/WCPW Internet Championship (1 time)
  - Pro Wrestling World Cup English Qualifying (2017)
- Evolve
  - Evolve Championship (1 time)
- German Stampede Wrestling
  - GSW Breakthrough Championship (1 time)
- International Pro Wrestling: United Kingdom
  - IPW:UK All-England Championship (1 time)
  - IPW:UK Tag Team Championship (2 times) – with Marty Scurll
  - UK Super 8 Tournament (2014)
  - Tag Team Tournament (2017) – with Jimmy Havoc
- New Japan Pro-Wrestling
  - IWGP Heavyweight Championship (2 times) (Note: During both of Sabre Jr.'s reigns, the title was called the IWGP World Heavyweight Championship.)
  - IWGP Intercontinental Championship (2 times) (Note: With the reactivation of the IWGP Heavyweight Championship and the restored and combined histories of both it, the World Heavyweight, and the Intercontinental titles, all former IWGP World Heavyweight Champions are retroactively recognized as having been an IWGP Intercontinental Champion.)
  - NJPW World Television Championship (2 times, inaugural)
  - IWGP Tag Team Championship (3 times) – with Taichi
  - NEVER Openweight 6-Man Tag Team Championship (1 time) – with Ryohei Oiwa and Hartley Jackson
  - New Japan Cup (2018, 2022)
  - G1 Climax (2024)
  - World Tag League (2025) – with Ryohei Oiwa
  - NJPW World Television Championship Tournament (2022–2023)
- NWA-UK Hammerlock
  - NWA United Kingdom Junior Heavyweight Championship (1 time)
  - Hardcore Lottery Tournament (2008)
- Premier Promotions
  - PWF Middleweight Championship (1 time)
  - PWF Light Heavyweight Championship (1 time)
  - Ian Dowland Trophy (2010)
  - Ken Joyce Trophy (2011)
  - Worthing Trophy (2012, 2013)
- Pro Wrestling Australia
  - PWA Colosseum Tournament (2023)
- Pro Wrestling Guerrilla
  - PWG World Championship (1 time)
  - Battle of Los Angeles (2015)
- Pro Wrestling Illustrated
  - Ranked No. 13 of the top 500 singles wrestlers in the PWI 500 in 2025
  - Ranked No. 3 of the top 50 Tag Teams in the PWI Tag Team 50 in 2021 – with Taichi
- Pro Wrestling Noah
  - GHC Junior Heavyweight Tag Team Championship (2 times) – with Yoshinari Ogawa
- Progress Wrestling
  - Super Strong Style 16 (2018)
- Revolution Pro Wrestling
  - British Heavyweight Championship (4 times)
  - Undisputed British Tag Team Championship (3 times) – with Marty Scurll (2) and Minoru Suzuki (1)
- Solent Wrestling Federation
  - One Night Tournament (2012)
- Tokyo Sports
  - MVP Award (2024)
  - Best Tag Team Award (2021) with Taichi
- Triple X Wrestling
  - Triple X Wrestling Heavyweight Championship (1 time)
- Westside Xtreme Wrestling
  - wXw World Heavyweight Championship (1 time) (Note: Both titles were unified to make the wXw Unified World Wrestling Championship)
  - wXw World Lightweight Championship (1 time, final)^{1}
  - wXw World Tag Team Championship (1 time) – with Big Daddy Walter
  - Ambition 4 (2013)
  - 16 Carat Gold Tournament (2016)
  - wXw World Tag Team Tournament (2015) – with Big Daddy Walter
- Wrestling Observer Newsletter
  - Bryan Danielson Award (Best Technical Wrestler) (2014–2020, 2024, 2025) (Note: Renamed from "Best Technical Wrestler" to "Bryan Danielson Award (Best Technical Wrestler)" in the 15 February 2016 issue of the Wrestling Observer Newsletter, between his third and fourth wins.)
  - Koichi Yoshizawa Award (Japan MVP) (2024)
  - Best Technical Wrestler of the Decade (2010s)
