= 65daysofstatic =

English post-rock band

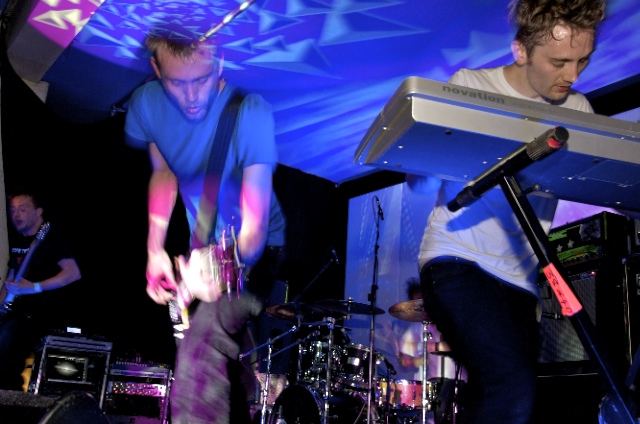
- 65daysofstatic at Supersonic Festival 2009

Background information
- Also known as: 65dos; 65days; 65
- Origin: Sheffield, England
- Genres: Experimental rock; post-rock; electronic; math rock; instrumental rock; IDM; ambient; glitch
- Years active: 2001–present
- Labels: Superball; Hassle; Monotreme
- Members: Joe Shrewsbury; Paul Wolinski; Rob Jones; Simon Wright
- Website: 65daysofstatic.com

65daysofstatic (often abbreviated as 65dos, 65days, or simply 65) are an English post-rock band from Sheffield. Formed in 2001, the band is composed of instrumentalists Paul Wolinski, Joe Shrewsbury, Rob Jones and Simon Wright.

The band's music has been described as noisy, electronic, guitar-driven instrumentals, interspersed with live drums and off-beat sampled drums akin to those of IDM artists, although they have continued to evolve their sound by incorporating electronic music, drum and bass and glitch music. They have been described as, "a soundtrack to a new dimension, where rock, dance and electronica are equals."

The band's first album, The Fall of Math, was released in September 2004, to critical acclaim, described as "an album that can retain the dynamics, fraught tension and climactic explosiveness of its peers and influences, whilst still sounding like one of the most urgent and direct long-player releases of the year." The band released a further five studio albums, One Time for All Time, The Destruction of Small Ideas, We Were Exploding Anyway, Wild Light, replicr, 2019, and a soundtrack, Silent Running.

During the Game Awards 2014, it was announced that they would be providing the soundtrack for the video game No Man's Sky, followed by a live performance. An album containing music from the soundtrack, entitled No Man's Sky: Music for an Infinite Universe, was released in August 2016. During September 2017, the band announced new work involving algorithmic techniques, titled Decomposition Theory.

== History ==
=== Formation and early years (2001–2003) ===
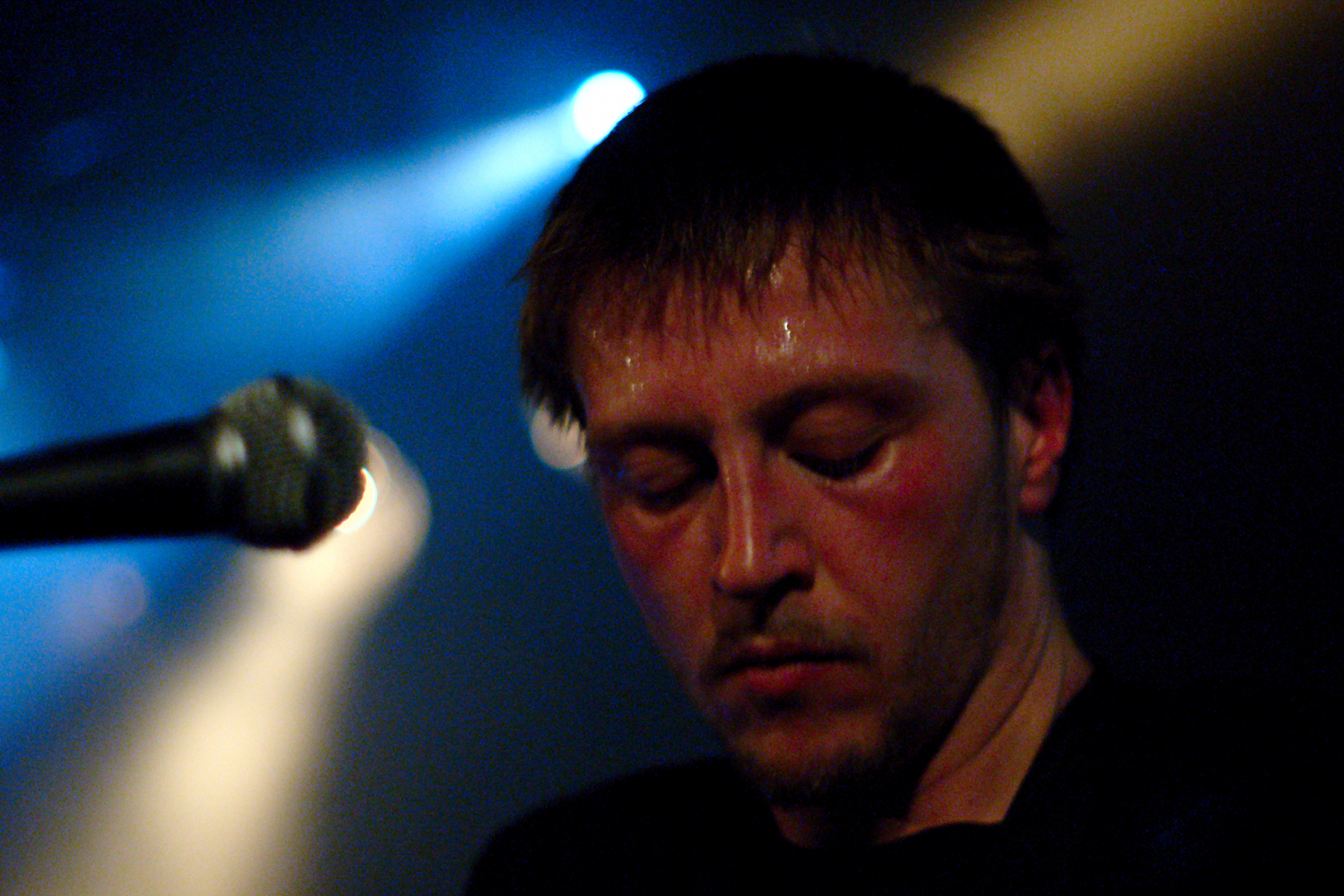
Joe Shrewsbury in 2009

The band was formed by Paul Wolinski and Joe Shrewsbury in 2001 with Rob Jones and Simon Wright joining in 2003.

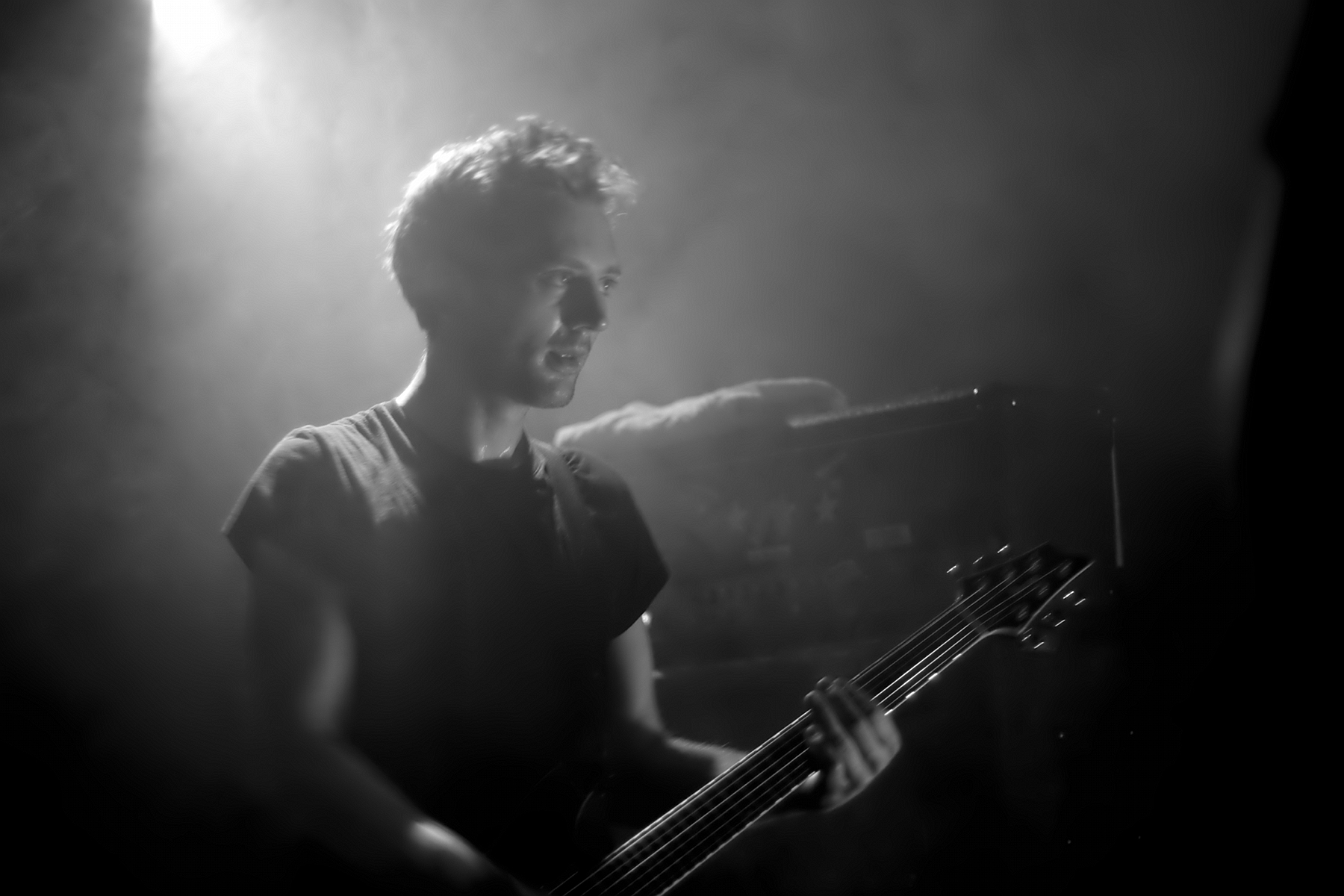
Paul Wolinski in 2009

Much of their early work consists of remixes and mash-ups of mainstream pop artists such as Christina Milian, Natasha Bedingfield and Justin Timberlake. These releases would come to be titled Unreleased/Unreleasable. One such mash-up, "White Noise Christmas" (for which a video later appeared on their DVD Volume 3: The Kids Have Eyes), featured on the first Boomselection compilation CD. Some of these were unofficially released on Unreleased/Unreleasable Volume 1 and Volume 2 in 2003 and 2005 respectively. The band also wrote their own music, releasing their first EP, Stumble.Stop.Repeat, in December 2003 on their own label, Dustpunk Records. There has been much online debate as to the exact number of copies printed but it has been estimated to be as low as 200. In 2019, the album was released digitally as part of a monthly supporter subscription, to promote the release of replicr, 2019.

=== The Fall of Math and One Time For All Time (2004–2005) ===
Recorded at 2fly studios in Sheffield in four days their first album was released on 20 September 2004. To promote the album, the band released a single, "Retreat! Retreat!", in November 2004, and embarked on two tours, firstly around the time of release and then again in January and February 2005. Their second EP, Hole, was released in March 2005, with the title-track taken from The Fall of Math and the band toured again in April and June of that year, with new material played in the latter tour.

During summer 2005, the band returned to the studio, intending to write an EP as a follow-up to The Fall of Math. However, the resulting tracks were ultimately released as their second album in October 2005. At the same time the band released a DVD, the third release in the Unreleased/Unreleasable series, entitled Volume 3: The Kids Have Eyes. This DVD was their final release on Dustpunk Records. To promote this album, 65 embarked on another UK tour in October, their fourth of the year, with support again from YMSS.

"Radio Protector" (2005)
"Radio Protector" from One Time for All Time

Although "Radio Protector" was the only track released as a single, a promotional video was also made for "Drove Through Ghosts To Get Here". This video was made by Medlo, their long-time collaborators, and Lord Bunn, an artist responsible for many of their T-shirt designs.

"Radio Protector" was the only track from One Time for All Time issued as a single. Released on 7" in February 2006, it was limited to 1500 numbered copies, with the first 1000 having a unique polaroid picture as the artwork. The remaining 500 have a digital copy of the thousandth picture as their artwork. An error in the numbering meant that each record is denoted as being x of 3000 instead of 1500. The band auctioned off the copy numbered 1/3000 on eBay, with the proceeds going to Friends of the Earth. A further UK tour, entitled the "Radio Protector Tour", coincided with this release. This tour was sandwiched between further dates by the band where they supported Hundred Reasons.

=== The Destruction of Small Ideas (2005–2007) ===
In 2005, 65daysofstatic remixed Alkaline Trio's single "Burn" from the album Crimson. The track appears on one 7" vinyl out of a set of two. In the same year, the band also remixed "...Spooks the Horse", a track by Youthmovie Soundtrack Strategies, for inclusion on the reissue of their first album, Hurrah! Another Year, Surely This One Will Be Better Than the Last; The Inexorable March of Progress Will Lead Us All to Happiness. After touring for most of 2006, 65 returned to the studio in December to record their third LP. Recording was completed shortly before Christmas, with mixing taking place in January 2007.

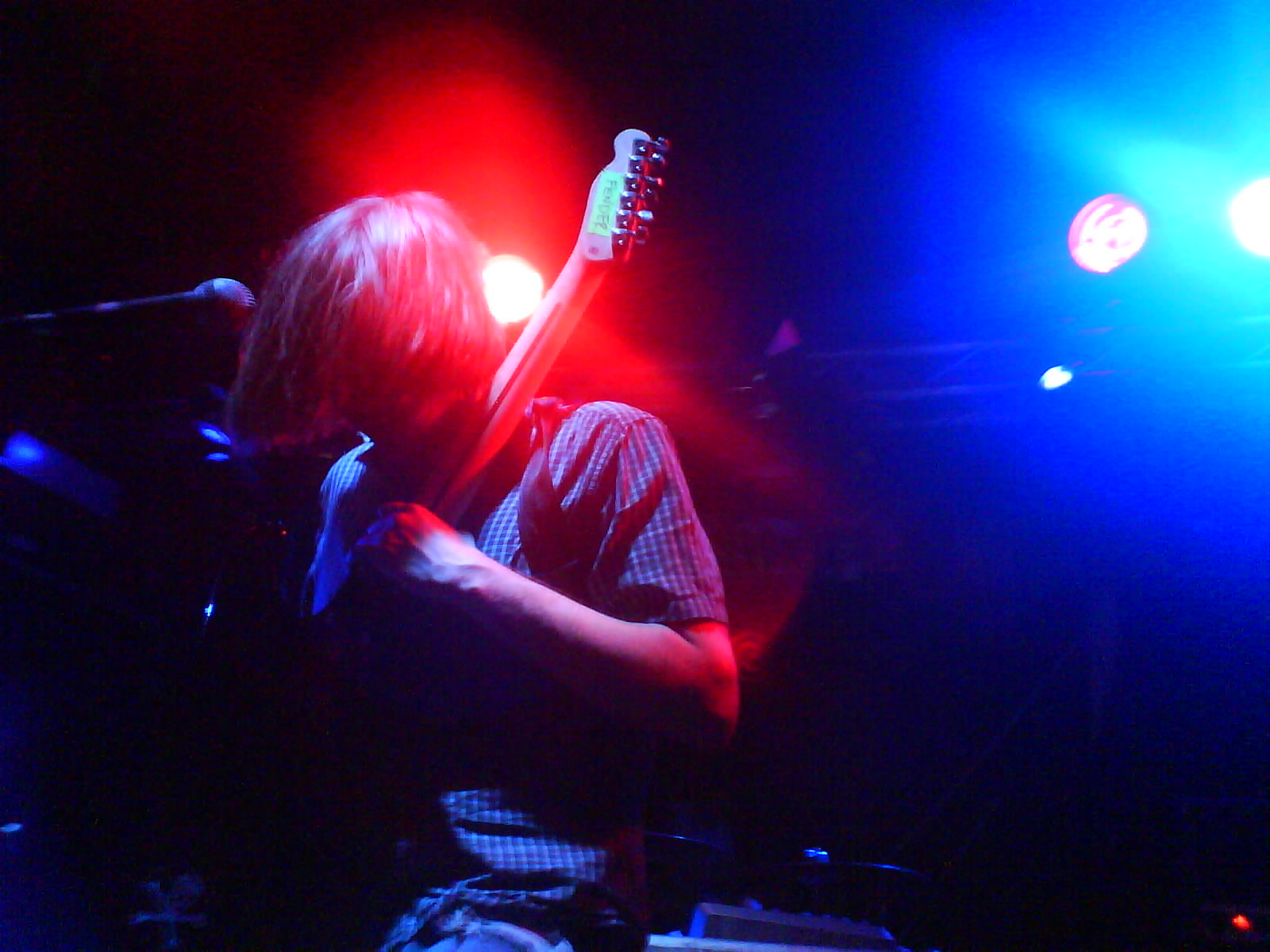
65daysofstatic live in Cork in 2007.

The Destruction of Small Ideas, was released on 30 April 2007. The album has contributions by members of The Mirimar Disaster, Digitonal and Circle Takes the Square. The track "Don't Go Down to Sorrow" was released as a single three weeks before this on 9 April, backed by a new song, "Morning in the Knife Quarter", and a remix of "The Major Cities of the World Are Being Destroyed One by One by the Monsters", a version of which appeared as a B-side on the "Retreat! Retreat!" single. This single was released on 21 March 2007 in Japan, while the album was released there on 23 April. The video for the single was made by Medlo.

An EP, The Distant and Mechanised Glow of Eastern European Dance Parties, was released on 7 April 2008, containing four new tracks, two being alternative versions of the title track, itself taken from the 2007 album The Destruction of Small Ideas. An alternate reality game was launched to promote the release, while the band also played their first UK shows for six months.

The band embarked on a short tour of the UK and Europe in support of the EP that April, during the break between The Cure's European and American tours, in which they are the main support act.

=== Escape from New York, We Were Exploding Anyway, and Heavy Sky EP (2008–2010) ===
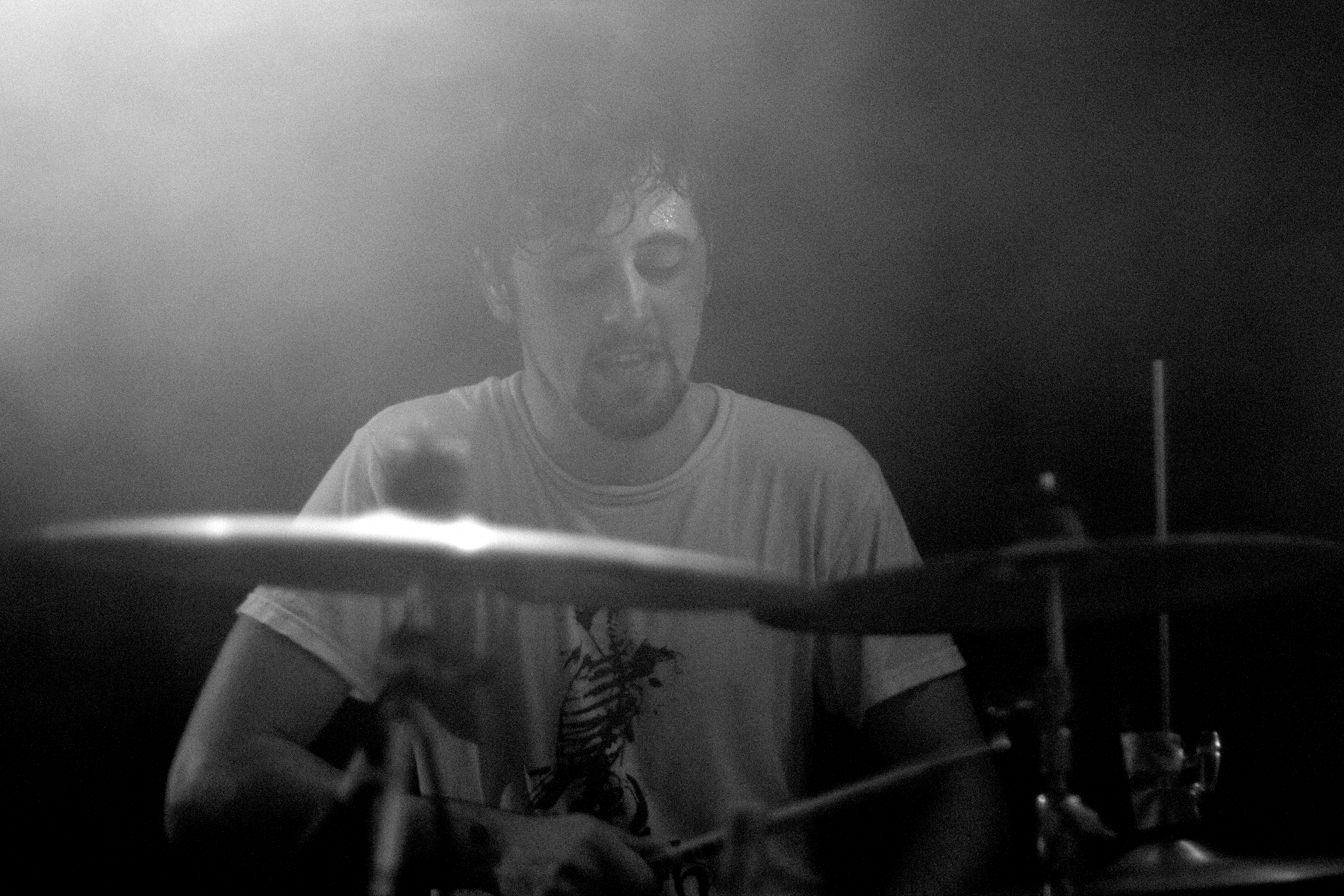
Rob Jones in 2009

In May and June 2008, they supported The Cure on their North American tour (a tour re-arranged from 2007). A live album, Escape from New York, was released on 20 April 2009 in the UK and 18 August 2009 in the US, featuring recordings from the Madison Square Gardens and Radio City Music Hall gigs. A small tour around the UK to demonstrate new material started in April 2009, followed by a European tour.

65daysofstatic's music was used to score the first radio adaptation of Kurt Vonnegut's novel Slaughterhouse-Five. The adaptation was broadcast on 20 September 2009 by BBC Radio 3 and 15 February 2010 on Radio 4.

The band took just seven days to record all the material for their fourth album, We Were Exploding Anyway, released in April 2010. A Japan-only maxi-single, "Weak4", was released prior to the album launch. First reviews of the album state that the band is going further away from the post-rock sound of their beginning and turning toward an electronic style, using more synthesizer and less electric guitar and live drums.

It was announced in late 2010 that there would be another release from the band, entitled Heavy Sky EP. This release contains other recordings from the Exploding sessions which hadn't found a place on the album, as well as a cut down edit of "Tiger Girl". The EP was made available to pre-order in a number of bundles, ranging from just the album to a "Super-Deluxe" package including exclusive merchandise. In January 2011 they released the Japanese version including a wordless version of "Come to Me", an alternative version of "Wrong Shape" and a new track, "String Loop". In July 2012 it was announced that a deluxe version of 'We Were Exploding Anyway / Heavy Sky' would be released in Australia through Bird's Robe Records, featuring the additional tracks 'Memorydress' and 'After San Francisco' as well as a new remix of 'Tiger Girl' by Australian instrumental group sleepmakeswaves.

=== Silent Running and Wild Light (2010–2014) ===
In July 2011, the band announced their intention to fund a studio recording of the Silent Running soundtrack by raising $7500 through the crowd-funding website Indie Gogo. By the end of the funding period they had actually raised over $27,000. Silent Running was released in mid-November 2011 as a numbered, limited edition vinyl LP to those Indie Gogo funders who had paid for this option, and as a digital download from the band's website.

On 30 July 2013, the band announced via Vimeo that their sixth album would be titled Wild Light, with a release scheduled for September 2013. The album went on to receive critical acclaim (with a score of 82 on Metacritic). Two singles were released from the album, "Prisms" and "Taipei".

=== No Man's Sky: Music for an Infinite Universe (2016) ===
In 2016, the band worked with developers of the procedural sci-fi exploration game No Man's Sky to create an in-game soundtrack which itself worked procedurally: the band recorded sounds and melodies (often with multiple variations) which were then combined dynamically by the game to create music in response to situations and player actions. The band also created ten original works and six soundscapes from the material and released them on the game's companion soundtrack album, No Man's Sky: Music for an Infinite Universe, in August 2016 as digital and retail formats. iam8bit also released the soundtrack on a 2 LP-disc vinyl record set alongside the game's release.

=== Decomposition Theory, Unreleased/Unreleasable Volume 4, and replicr, 2019 (2017–present) ===
In October 2017, the band announced a new work entitled Decomposition Theory or How I Learned to Stop Worrying and Demand the Future, featuring algorithmic music and live coding techniques, with the first performances taking place as part of Sheffield's Algomech Festival during November 2017. In Autumn 2018, the band toured across the UK and Europe in support of the project.

In April 2019, 65daysofstatic announced Unreleased/Unreleasable Volume 4: A Year of Wreckage, consisting of monthly extended plays released throughout 2019, composed from the Decomposition Theory project. The first EP in the series, Kazimir, was released on 1 May 2019. The band also announced a separate full-length album for release in Autumn 2019. The title of this album, replicr, 2019, was announced in July, alongside a release date of 27 September 2019.

On September 18, 2025 they released No Man’s Sky: Journeys which continues the band's long-standing collaboration with the video game No Man's Sky.

== Name ==
In their early days the band was known as 65*daysofstatic, though this version (with asterisk) was never used on any release. The origin of the name is unclear, with the band once stating that they took their name from an unreleased John Carpenter film called Stealth Bomber, starring Kurt Russell, that they had formed to create the soundtrack to. However, the lack of any further information regarding the film's existence makes this unlikely. Other theories include that the band took their name from the CIA's 1954 Guatemalan coup d'état during which the CIA put a white book instrument to use according to which 65 days of disabling the communication systems of a nation while spreading propaganda is enough to overthrow a country, or, as put forward by New Statesman, that the name was derived from psychological experiments conducted in the 1950s to 1960s, in which it was found that exposure to 65 days of white noise (or static) would render the listener insane.

== Live performances ==
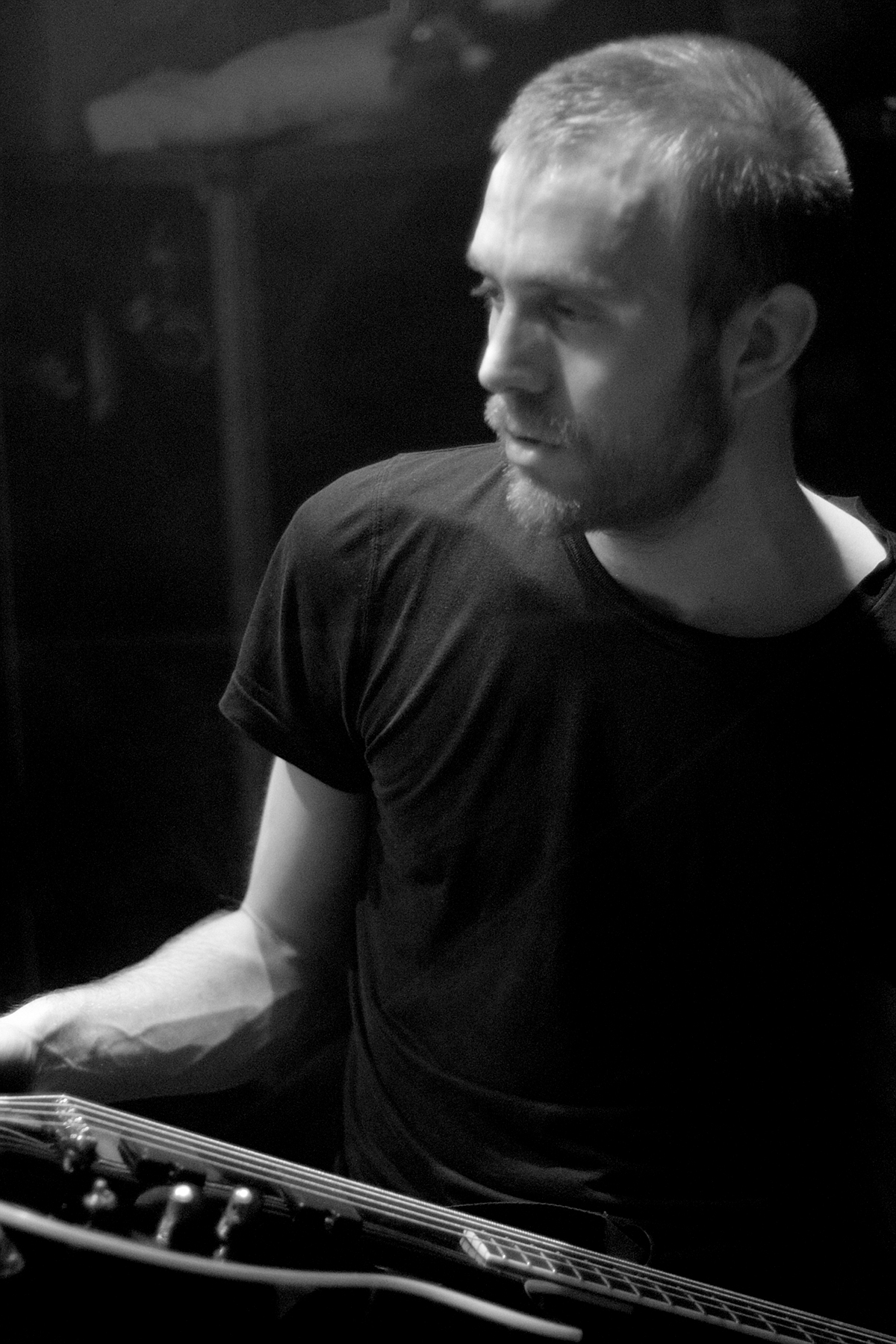
Simon Wright in 2009

The band members have repeatedly stated that they enjoy playing live. Towards the end of 2005, in a mail-out to subscribers of their newsletter, they said that they were "a little disappointed" only to have played 91 shows in that year. They have received critical acclaim from independent music websites, such as Drowned in Sound, for their live shows.

In 2006, they played to their biggest crowd yet at that year's Summer Sonic festival in Japan, alongside such bands as Metallica, Lostprophets, Linkin Park, and Deftones. 2006 also saw their first European tour, playing in Belgium, The Netherlands, Germany, Italy and France. They have performed frequently with live visuals from Medlo, long-term collaborators with the band. They made guest appearances on the band's 2006 and 2007 UK tours, and also produced the majority of their music videos, including "Radio Protector", "Drove Through Ghosts to Get Here" and "Don't Go Down to Sorrow".

Having played their first American shows at SXSW in March 2007, they embarked on their first American tour supporting Fear Before the March of Flames in July and August 2007. Following that was "The Destruction of Small Ideas Tour Part 2", which saw them play venues across Ireland, the UK, and several other European countries.

In May and June 2008, the band toured the US as the supporting act for The Cure. During this same time period the band also performed as a headliner in smaller venues.

In early 2009, the band announced a series of live dates in the UK to preview new material for the follow-up to The Destruction of Small Ideas, this was followed by a live album, Escape from New York, released in April 2009.

The band were to embark on their first world tour in March 2010, playing shows in Asia (Malaysia, Singapore, Taiwan, Japan), America (at the SXSW festival in Austin, Texas), and Europe. However, outside of Europe all shows were cancelled except for the Japanese dates due to a family emergency within the band.

In May 2011, the band provided a live score to the film Silent Running as a part of the Sensoria Music & Film Festival.

In August 2012, the band announced their first ever Australian show, as part of the 2012 Peat's Ridge Festival in December. Details of a full Australian tour were then announced, with the band visiting Sydney, Brisbane, Melbourne and Perth in January 2013.

In October 2013, the band announced several new UK dates for March 2014. They visited Exeter, Southampton, London, Norwich and Glasgow. The London show at Koko was The Fall of Math anniversary show and comprised two sets: the first being The Fall of Math in its entirety. Later on, the band closed their 2014 tour with another similar The Fall of Math anniversary gig at Manchester Cathedral.

== 65kids ==
Fans of the band are known as '65kids', although the band has also been known to use the phrase. The name was also used by now defunct fansite 65kids.com which hosted ‘torrents, music videos, unreleasable pop mashup albums, remixes, DVDs, tour diaries, live recordings, and radio sessions'.

== Discography ==
=== Albums ===
- The Fall of Math (2004)
- One Time for All Time (2005)
- The Destruction of Small Ideas (2007)
- We Were Exploding Anyway (2010)
- Wild Light (2013)
- replicr, 2019 (2019)
- Mimik (2025)

=== Soundtracks ===
- Silent Running (2011)
- No Man's Sky: Music for an Infinite Universe (2016)
- No Man's Sky - Vostok / The Journey (2025)
- No Man's Sky: Journeys (with Paul Weir) (2025)

=== Compilation albums ===
- The Last Dance (2012)
- Exvironments (2020)
- Disquiet (2020)
- Utopian Frequencies (2020)

=== Live albums ===
- Escape from New York (Double disc – Live and DVD) (2009)
- Decomposition Theory Live 091117 (2020)
- Wild Light (Live in Manchester 150923) (2023)

=== Singles and EPs ===
- Play Nice Kids (EP, 2001)
- Stumble.Stop.Repeat (EP, 2003)
- "Retreat! Retreat!" (2004)
- Hole (EP, 2005)
- "Radio Protector" (2006)
- "Don't Go Down to Sorrow" (2007)
- "The Distant and Mechanised Glow of Eastern European Dance Parties" (2008)
- "Weak4" (2010)
- "Crash Tactics" (2010)
- Heavy Sky (EP, 2011)
- Taipei (2014)
- popular beats (2019)
- trackerplatz (2019)
- five waves (2019)
- Under the Summs (2024)
- Tomorrowd (2024)
- Available Data (2025)

=== Unreleased/Unreleasable ===
- Volume 1: 65's.late.nite.double-a-side.college.cut-up.trailers.for.the.looped.future. (2003)
- Volume 2: How I Fucked Off All My Friends (2005)
- Volume 3: The Kids Have Eyes (DVD) (2005)
- Volume 4: A Year of Wreckage (2019)
  - 4.1: Kazimir (May 2019)
  - 4.2: Fugue State (June 2019)
  - 4.3: Looped Future (July 2019)
  - 4.4: Ptolyweirds (August 2019)
  - 4.5: Exvironments Pt.1 (September 2019)
  - 4.6: Miniatures (October 2019)
  - 4.7: 7over8 (November 2019)
  - 4.8: Decomp Sketches (December 2019)
  - 4.9: Tempo Heavy (January 2020)
  - 4.10: Resistor/Noise (February 2020)
  - 4.11: Exvironments Pt.2 (March 2020)
  - 4.12: Endings (April 2020)

=== B-sides and rarities ===
- Volume 1: '...Then We Take Japan' (CD + DVD, 2006)

=== Unofficial ===
- RMXSCEE (2008) (A collection of remixes by the band)

=== Music Videos ===
- Retreat Retreat (2004)
- Hole (2004)
- Drove Through Ghosts (2005)
- Don't Go Down to Sorrow (2007)
- PX3 (2010)
- Prisms (2013)
- Taipei (2014)
- Trackerplatz (2019)
- Popular Beats (2019)
