= Try Harder Records =

Independent record label, 2005-2009

Try Harder Records was a small independent record label that released music by Tired Irie, Blood Red Shoes, Foals, Jonquil, Redjetson, Blanket and Pioneers Press author/"talking songs" musician Adam Gnade. The label was founded in late 2005 by Alan English, guitarist with Youthmovies, Sim O'Farrell, and Simon Cope. Its final release was in 2009.

== Records released ==
- The Joy Formidable Cradle Double 7" single
- Adam Gnade Trailerparks Limited CD tour-only version
- Playdoe Sibot & Spoek are Playdoe Digital-only release
- Larsen B Marilyn 7" single
- Tired Irie Hexagon CD single
- Tired Irie Tired Irie CD EP
- Blanket Blankit CD Album
- Redjetson The Unravelling 7" single
- Jonquil Lions CD Album
- Adam Gnade and Youthmovies Honey Slides CD EP
- Jonquil Sunny Casinos CD Album
- Blood Red Shoes ADHD 7" single
- FoalsTry This on Your Piano 7" single
- Blood Red Shoes Stitch Me Back 7" single
- Tired Irie Like. Gentle. Men. 7" single
