= Eugene McGuinness (album) =

Studio album by Eugene McGuinness
- Released: 12 October 2008
- Recorded: Two Kilohertz Studios; London, England
- Genre: Post-punk revival
- Length: 37:01
- Label: Domino Recording Company
- Producer: Ant Whiting

Eugene McGuinness chronology
Eugene McGuinness (2008)	Glue (2009)

Professional ratings
Review scores
Source	Rating
AllMusic	4/5 stars
Drowned in Sound	8/10 stars
BBC	(favourable)

Eugene McGuinness is the debut studio album by British singer-songwriter Eugene McGuinness. It was released on 12 October 2008 in the United Kingdom, and on 23 June 2009 in North America, through Domino Recording Company.

== Track listing ==
1. "Rings Around Rosa" – 2:36
2. "Fonz" – 2:20
3. "Wendy Wonders" – 3:58
4. "Moscow State Circus" – 4:36
5. "Those Old Black and White Movies Were True" – 2:49
6. "Nightshift" – 1:38
7. "Atlas" – 2:55
8. "Knock Down Ginger" – 3:10
9. "Crown the Clown" – 2:58
10. "Not So Academic" – 3:38
11. "Disneyfied" – 2:31
12. "God in Space" – 3:52
