= Good Nature (Youthmovies album) =

Studio album by Youthmovies
- Released: 17 March 2008
- Genre: Math rock; post-rock
- Label: Drowned in Sound (UK)
- Producer: Ant Theaker

Professional ratings
Review scores
Source	Rating
Rock Sound	9/10
The Skinny	4/5 stars

Good Nature is an album by the Oxford-based post-rock band Youthmovies. It was released on 17 March 2008, on Drowned in Sound. It was the band's only album.

== Critical reception ==
BBC Music wrote: "Strikingly original and refreshingly capricious in style, the Oxford five-piece have crafted something that, while far from immediate, demands attention and admiration." The Independent called the album "a refreshingly innovative and bloody-minded record that frequently surprises, especially when [the band] really cut loose."

== Track listing ==
1. "Magdalen Bridge"
2. "The Naughtiest Girl is a Monitor"
3. "Soandso and Soandso"
4. "the Last Night of the Proms"
5. "Cannulae"
6. "If You'd Seen a Battlefield"
7. "Shh! You'll Wake it!"
8. "Something for the Ghosts"
9. "Archive it Everywhere"
10. "Surtsey"

== Personnel ==
- Andrew Mears – guitar, vocals
- Al English – guitar, backing vocals
- Stephen Hammond – bass guitar
- Graeme Murray – drums
- Sam Scott – trumpet, keyboards
