= Try Harder =

Try Harder may refer to:

- "Try Harder" (Blood Red Shoes song)
- "Try Harder" (Elkie Brooks song)
- "Try Harder" (Mavis Staples song)
- Try Harder!, a documentary film
- Try Harder Records
