= Heavy Sky =

EP by 65daysofstatic
- Released: 25 October 2011
- Genre: Electronica, instrumental rock, post-industrial, dance music
- Length: 33:26; 50:01 (Japan only)
- Label: Hassle Records

65daysofstatic chronology
We Were Exploding Anyway (2010)	Heavy Sky (2011)	Silent Running (2011)

Singles from Heavy Sky
- 1. "Tiger Girl" Released: 18 October 2010

Professional ratings
Review scores
Source	Rating
Drowned in Sound	7/10 stars
Sputnikmusic	3.5/5 stars

Heavy Sky is the fourth studio EP by 65daysofstatic. It was recorded in Sheffield, during the We Were Exploding Anyway sessions. It was released on 25 October 2010 in Europe and the United States, and on 15 January 2011 in Japan. It is their first EP to be released on Hassle Records. The only single, "Tiger Girl (Wishful Thinking Edit)", was released on 18 October.

== Style ==
Musically, it follows the same electronic/post-rock course as We Were Exploding Anyway. Closing track Guitar Cascades has similarities to the closing track on We Were Exploding Anyway, Tiger Girl. The Japanese version contains 3 bonus tracks, including an instrumental version of WWEA track Come To Me, an alternate version of The Wrong Shape and a new, more epic-sounding track, String Loop. The Track PX3 was given away as a free download, prior to release, on the 65daysofstatic website.

== Release ==
The album debuted at number 9 in the UK independent albums chart.

== Track listing ==
1. "Tiger Girl (Wishful Thinking Edit)" – 3:52
2. "Sawtooth Rising" – 4:58
3. "The Wrong Shape" – 4:04
4. "Pacify" – 4:15
5. "PX3" – 4:01
6. "Beats Like a Helix" - 2:10
7. "Guitar Cascades" – 10:29
8. "String Loop" (Japanese Bonus Track) – 5:15
9. "The Wrong Shape (Alternate Version)" (Japanese Bonus Track) – 3:40
10. "Come To Me (Instrumental)" (Japanese Bonus Track) - 7:47
