= Hurrah! Another Year, Surely This One Will Be Better Than the Last; The Inexorable March of Progress Will Lead Us All to Happiness =

EP by Youthmovie Soundtrack Strategies
- Released: 2004
- Recorded: March–May 2004
- Genre: Post-rock
- Length: 31:31
- Label: Fierce Panda Records
- Producer: Ant Theaker

Alternative cover of EP

Hurrah! Another Year, Surely This One Will Be Better Than the Last; The Inexorable March of Progress Will Lead Us All to Happiness is a 2004 EP by post-rock band Youthmovie Soundtrack Strategies.

It was later re-released in 2005 with two new tracks and a video for "Ores".

It was recorded between March 23, 2004 and May 7, 2004, in various places across London. It was released in a cardboard cover held in place with a pin, containing a poster, and was limited to 2000 copies. The EP is dedicated to the memory of Jimmi Lawrence, late guitarist of the now-defunct Hope of the States.

British music newspaper NME chose it as "one of 11 albums with ludicrously lengthy titles,

British wrestler Zack Sabre Jr. paid tribute to this EP by naming one of his signature moves after this EP. The move in question is a double armbar octopus hold.

== Track listing ==
1. "The Pitch and Yaw of Satellites" – 9:32
2. "A Little Late He Staggered Through the Door and Into Her Eyes" – 6:08
3. "Recovery Speak" – 7:26
4. "...Spooks the Horse" – 8:25

== Re-release track listing ==
1. "The Pitch and Yaw of Satellites" – 9:32
2. "A Little Late He Staggered Through the Door and Into Her Eyes" – 6:08
3. "Recovery Speak" – 7:26
4. "...Spooks the Horse" – 8:25
5. "Ores" – 4:00
6. "...Spooks the Horse" (65daysofstatic remix) – 4:15
- Ores (video)

== Personnel ==
- Andrew Mears – guitar, vocals
- Alan English – guitar/electronics
- Stephen Hammond – bass
- Graeme Murray – drums
- The Broken Throats – backing vocals on "A Little Late He Staggered Through the Door and Into Her Eyes"
- Jonny Farrell – saxophone on "Recovery Speak"
