= Wild Light (album) =

Studio album by 65daysofstatic
- Released: 16 September 2013
- Genre: Post-rock, electronic
- Length: 50:22
- Label: Superball Music
- Producer: 65daysofstatic

65daysofstatic chronology
Silent Running (2011)	Wild Light (2013)	"No Man's Sky: Music for an Infinite Universe" (2016)

Wild Light is the fifth studio album by 65daysofstatic, released on 16 September 2013 in the UK and Europe and on 29 October 2013 in the United States. It is the band's first album released on the Superball Music label.

== Reception ==
Professional ratings
Aggregate scores
Source	Rating
Metacritic	82/100
Review scores
Source	Rating
AllMusic	4/5 stars
Clash Music	8/10
New Musical Express	8/10
Q	3/5 stars

Upon release, Wild Light received generally positive reviews from music critics. At Metacritic, which assigns a normalized rating out of 100 to reviews from mainstream critics, the album received an average score of 82/100 based on 12 reviews.

"The pomp that they derive from taking dour post-rock to a rave - notable here in Prisms - is satisfying," according to Q. "Similarly enjoyable are pyroclastic flows of guitars and electronics as heard in Unmake the Wild Light," concludes reviewer Luke Turner, giving the album a 3/5 rating.

== Track listing ==
No.	Title	Length
1.	"Heat Death Infinity Splitter"	5:06
2.	"Prisms"	5:58
3.	"The Undertow"	6:32
4.	"Blackspots"	7:30
5.	"Sleepwalk City"	6:54
6.	"Taipei"	6:00
7.	"Unmake the Wild Light"	6:24
8.	"Safe Passage"	5:58
Total length:		50:22

Digipack bonus track
No.	Title	Length
9.	"Destructivist"	4:08

iTunes bonus track
No.	Title	Length
9.	"Doxxx Yrself"	5:06
