= The Destruction of Small Ideas =

Studio album by 65daysofstatic
- Released: 30 April 2007
- Genre: Post-rock
- Length: 62:16
- Label: Monotreme
- Producer: 65daysofstatic

65daysofstatic chronology
One Time for All Time (2005)	The Destruction of Small Ideas (2007)	We Were Exploding Anyway (2010)

Professional ratings
Review scores
Source	Rating
Drowned in Sound	6/10
entertainment.ie	2/5 stars
The Guardian	3/5 stars
Insiders' Guides	10/10
Playlouder	4/5 stars
Rockmidgets	5/5
Sputnikmusic	4/5 stars
Stylus Magazine	A−

The Destruction of Small Ideas is the third studio album by 65daysofstatic. It was released on 30 April 2007 in the United Kingdom, on 1 May 2007 in the United States on Monotreme, and on 23 April 2007 in Japan on Zankyo.

"Don't Go Down to Sorrow" was the first single from the album, released in the UK on 9 April, in the United States on 17 April, and in Japan on 23 March.

A double-gatefold vinyl version of the album was released on 12 November 2007, also through Monotreme Records.

On its release the album's production was criticised by some reviewers, but the band have stated in an interview that this was intentional and directly influenced by an article written by Nick Southall for Stylus Magazine.

== Track listing ==
1. "When We Were Younger & Better" – 6:54
2. "A Failsafe" – 4:28
3. "Don't Go Down to Sorrow" – 6:55
4. "Wax Futures" – 4:03
5. "These Things You Can't Unlearn" – 6:27
6. "Lyonesse" – 3:26
7. "Music Is Music as Devices Are Kisses Is Everything" – 5:20
8. "The Distant & Mechanised Glow of Eastern European Dance Parties" – 3:33
9. "Little Victories" – 5:14
10. "Primer" – 4:51
11. "White Peak/Dark Peak" – 3:57
12. "The Conspiracy of Seeds" (featuring Circle Takes the Square) – 7:08
