= The Fall of Math =

Studio album by 65daysofstatic
- Released: 20 September 2004
- Recorded: 2Fly Studios (Sheffield, England); Home Recordings; Tracks 1, 4 & 8
- Genres: Post-rock, math rock
- Length: 43:50
- Labels: Monotreme; MONO08
- Producers: Alan Smyth; 65daysofstatic

65daysofstatic chronology
Stumble.Stop.Repeat EP (2003)	The Fall of Math (2004)	Hole EP (2005)

Professional ratings
Review scores
Source	Rating
Blogcritics	(favourable)
Drowned in Sound	9/10
PopMatters	9/10

The Fall of Math is the debut album by the instrumental post-rock band 65daysofstatic, released on 20 September 2004 through Monotreme.

== Release ==
The album spawned two singles, both released after the album. While "Retreat! Retreat!" was a standard CD single release featuring two b-sides, "Hole" was released as a 7-track EP with a length of almost thirty minutes. Both tracks were accompanied by promotional videos.

"Retreat! Retreat!" samples a voice of Matt Dillon from the 1992 film Singles ("This negative energy just makes me stronger, we will not retreat, this band is unstoppable!"). The music video for "Retreat! Retreat!" was produced by Media Lounge. An unusual time signature 10/4 is used in the middle of the song.

The song "Aren't We All Running?" appeared in the initial trailer for the video game Binary Domain.

== Track listing ==
No.	Title	Length
1.	"Another Code Against the Gone"	1:40
2.	"Install a Beak in the Heart That Clucks Time in Arabic"	4:55
3.	"Retreat! Retreat!" (released as a single)	4:09
4.	"Default This"	1:43
5.	"I Swallowed Hard, Like I Understood"	5:27
6.	"The Fall of Math"	3:59
7.	"This Cat is a Landmine"	4:45
8.	"The Last Home Recording"	2:13
9.	"Hole" (released as a single)	4:33
10.	"Fix the Sky a Little"	5:29
11.	"Aren't We All Running?"	4:51
