= One Time for All Time =

Studio album by 65daysofstatic
- Released: October 24, 2005
- Recorded: 2Fly Studios (Sheffield, England)
- Genre: Post-rock
- Length: 37:10
- Label: Monotreme (MONO016)
- Producer: Alan Smyth

65daysofstatic chronology
The Fall of Math (2004)	One Time for All Time (2005)	The Destruction of Small Ideas (2007)

Professional ratings
Review scores
Source	Rating
AllMusic	3/5 stars
Drowned in Sound	9/10 stars
Sonic Frontiers	(favourable)

One Time for All Time is the second studio album by the instrumental post-rock band 65daysofstatic, released on October 24, 2005, on Monotreme.

"Radio Protector" was released as a 7" single in February 2006 on Monotreme Records. The band have stated on their website that this will be the only single release from the album.

== Track listing ==
1. "Drove Through Ghosts to Get Here" – 4:18
2. "Await Rescue" – 4:44
3. "23kid" – 4:32
4. "Welcome to the Times" – 3:53
5. "Mean Low Water" – 4:00
6. "Climbing on Roofs (DeSperate Edit)" – 2:27
7. "The Big Afraid" – 2:08
8. "65 Doesn't Understand You" – 5:36
9. "Radio Protector" – 5:26

Bonus tracks on Japanese release (previously released on Retreat! Retreat! single)

- "AOD" – 6:15
- "The Major Cities of the World Are Being Destroyed One By One By the Monsters" – 4:09
