= Eugene McGuinness =

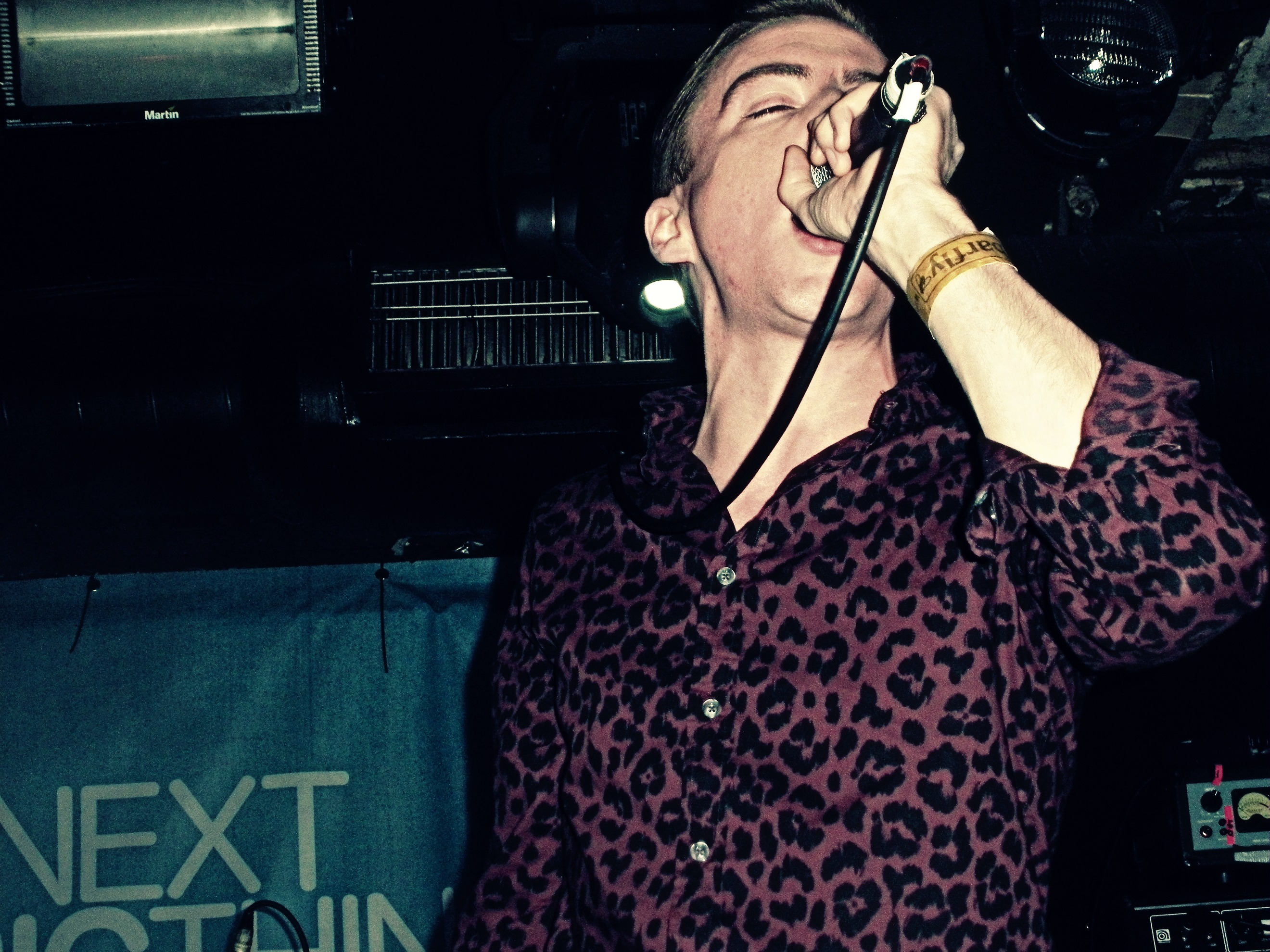
- Eugene McGuinness performing

Background information
- Also known as: Eugene + the Lizards
- Born: Eugene Michael McGuinness; 11 August 1985 (age 41); Leytonstone, London, England
- Genre: Indie rock
- Occupation: Singer-songwriter
- Instruments: Guitar; Vocals; Piano
- Works: Miles Kane, Arctic Monkeys, Dominic McGuinness
- Years active: 2007–present
- Labels: Docklands Speed Shop Records, Domino
- Website: Eugene McGuiness' Domino Minisite Eugene McGuinness Mellowtone Records

Eugene Michael McGuinness (born 11 August 1985) is an English singer-songwriter and frontman of Eugene + the Lizards.

== Music career ==
McGuinness's first release, The Early Learnings of Eugene McGuinness, was released on 6 August 2007 on Domino Records' sublabel Double Six Records. Although the extended play was less than half an hour long, it received praise from critics. BBC reviewer Chris White called it "brimful with ideas" and stated that McGuinness's voice on the record "soars euphorically and coos playfully with equal aplomb". Drowned in Sound gave the EP a rating of 9/10, saying "McGuinness has a way with words that's quite remarkable". However, despite gaining the backing of its critics, it failed to chart in the United Kingdom.

Following the good response of Learnings, he went on to release his eponymous debut album, Eugene McGuinness, on the Domino label on 13 October 2008. Unlike the last release, Eugene McGuinness is a full-length album with 12 tracks. The album received generally positive reviews from critics. Drowned in Sound labelled it "a bold and confident piece of brilliance, equally off kilter as it is tenderly raw". The BBC said that the album "runs the formative gamut of angsty, carefree, happy-sad, hormone-fuelled, late-teens emotions with a solipsistic disregard for any feelings but his own". NME gave the album 8 out of 10, and The Times named it their album of the week. Meanwhile, an Observer journalist called the album "busily eclectic but... can make no great claims to originality". AllMusic gave it 4 out of 5 stars, saying that "the arrival of Eugene McGuinness a true cause for celebration".

McGuinness began playing as Eugene + the Lizards, along with his brother Dominic McGuinness, Malcolm Lunan and John Barrett. On 30 November 2009, they released their first album together, Glue. It was originally released as a six-track limited edition 10" vinyl record, which then came with a digital code to download all six tracks plus the additional four tracks online for free, though the full album is now available on iTunes and AmazonMp3.

Alongside playing as a session and tour member for Miles Kane, McGuinness finished the recording of his third album in London. The Invitation to the Voyage was released on 6 August 2012, and contained the singles "Lion", "Thunderbolt", "Shotgun" and "Harlequinade".

== Discography ==
=== Albums ===
- The Early Learnings of Eugene McGuinness EP (2007, Double Six)
- Eugene McGuinness (2008, Domino Records)
- Glue (as Eugene + the Lizards) (2009, Domino Records)
- The Invitation to the Voyage (2012, Domino Records)
- Chroma (2014, Domino Records)
- Suburban Gothic (2018)
- Lost Illusions (2020)
- Engine (2021)
- Suburban Gothic II (Beyond the neon) (2021)
- "Eugene McGuinness Versus The Universe" (2026)

=== Singles ===
- "Monsters Under the Bed" (2007)
- "Bold Street" (2007)
- "Moscow State Circus" (2008)
- "Fonz" (2009)
- "Bugjuice" (2010)
- "Lion" (2011)
- "Thunderbolt" (2011)
- "Shotgun" (2012)
- "Harlequinade" (2012)
- "Sugarplum" (2012)
- "Fairlight" (2013)
- "Godiva" (2014)
- "Start At The Stopt" (2018)
- "Yeayoubetcha" (2020)
- "For The Love Of God" (2021)
- "Seascape" (2025)
- "London" (2025)
- "Eastend Réquiem" (2026)

== Videography ==
- "Monsters Under The Bed" (2007)
- "Moscow State Circus" (2008)
- "Fonz" (2009)
- "Wendy Wonders" (2009)
- "Bugjuice" (2010)
- "Grogshop" (2010)
- "Lion" (2011)
- "Shotgun" (2012)
- "Blue Jeans" (2012)
- "Harlequinade" (2012)
- "Sugarplum" (2012)
- "Fairlight" (2013)
- "Godiva" (2014)
- "I Drink Your Milkshake" (2014)
- "London" (2025)
- "Icarus" (2026)
- "Eastend Réquiem" (2026)
