= Glue (Eugene + the Lizards album) =

Studio album by Eugene + the Lizards
- Released: 30 November 2009
- Genre: Post-punk revival
- Length: 29:57
- Label: Domino Records

Eugene McGuinness chronology
Eugene McGuinness (2008)	Glue (2009)	The Invitation to the Voyage (2012)

Glue is the debut studio album by British indie rock band Eugene + the Lizards, following frontman Eugene McGuinness's debut album the previous year. Glue was released on 30 November 2009 through Domino Records.

It was originally released as a 6-track limited edition 10" vinyl record, which then came with a digital code to download all 6 tracks plus the additional 4 tracks online for free, though it is now available for normal digital download on iTunes, AmazonMp3 and Domino mart.

== Track listing ==
All tracks are written by Eugene McGuinness.

10", digital download (RUG346)
No.	Title	Length
1.	"Bug Juice"	2:43
2.	"I Want Action"	2:46
3.	"Irrational Anthem"	2:11
4.	"Dear English Reserve"	2:34
5.	"Meet Me at the Skyline Plaza"	2:57
6.	"This Kind of Talk"	2:34
7.	"Sus Law"	4:26
8.	"Elizabeth"	2:36
9.	"Maypole"	3:04
10.	"Grogshop"	4:04
