= Redjetson =

British band

- Origin: Essex, England
- Genres: Post-Rock
- Labels: Steinbeck, Drowned in Sound, Talitres, Try Harder, Gizeh
- Members: Clive Kentish, Daniel Hills, Daniel Carney, Ian Jarrold, Grant Taylor & Joel Hussey

Redjetson was a UK-based post-rock band. In 2002, they released a self-titled single on Steinbeck Records. They followed this up with a second release in 2003, again on Steinbeck Records. During 2004, the band toured extensively including a tour with Youthmovie Soundtrack Strategies, whom they released a split 12" with on the Drowned in Sound Recordings Label. In January 2005, they released the album New General Catalogue on Drowned in Sound Recordings. The album collected the two songs from the previous split 12" along with a further nine songs including re-recordings of songs featured on their first two releases. They followed the album with a single of "This, Every Day, For The Rest of Your Life". This also included making a music video. The band finished off 2005 by supporting Bloc Party at Brixton Academy and ¡Forward, Russia! on several dates around the UK.

By April 2006 the album had received a European release on the Talitres label and the band followed this up with a tour with Leeds-based band iLiKETRAiNS. The band played a handful of gigs demoing new songs. They also supported Hope of the States at KoKo, played the Truck Festival in Oxford and went on a mini tour of Ireland. A double A-side single "The Unravelling"/"Racing in the Mire" was released on 16 April 2007 by Try Harder Records. The band played a gig at the Luminaire to celebrate the release with support from Cats and Cats and Cats. Redjetson disbanded in July 2008. Their posthumous 2nd album, Other Arms, was released on 20 April 2009 by Gizeh Records.

== Discography ==
=== Albums ===
==== New General Catalogue ====
January 2005

Drowned in Sound Recordings Label (DiS0008)

1. "Divorce"
2. "Stay Comfortable"
3. "This, Every Day, For The Rest of Your Life"
4. "This City Moans"
5. "...The Sky Is Breaking"
6. "New Europe"
7. "A Reptile, Cold Blood"
8. "Wednesday's Rivals"
9. "Perseverance Works"
10. "America Is Its Only Friend"
11. "Pieces Go Missing"

==== Other Arms ====
20 April 2009

Gizeh Records (GZH20)

1. "Soldiers & Dinosaurs"
2. "Beta Blocker"
3. "For Those Who Died Dancing"
4. "Questions I Don't Want To Ask"
5. "Count These Demons"
6. "Witches at the Controls"
7. "First of the 47,000"
8. "(g)Listen"
9. "Threnody"
10. "These Structures"

=== Singles and EPs ===
==== Untitled release ====
2002

Steinbeck Label (STEIN01CD)

1. "08.08.88"
2. "Shoot You Coward, For You Will Only Kill A Man"
3. "Pieces Go Missing"

==== Untitled release ====
2003

Steinbeck Label (STEIN02CD)

1. "...The Sky Is Breaking"
2. "Perseverance Works"
3. "New Europe"

==== "This, Every Day, For The Rest of Your Life" ====
31 October 2005

Drowned in Sound Recordings Label (DiS0014)

1. "This, Every Day, For The Rest of Your Life"
2. "Perseverance Works" (Cern Remix)
3. "Stay Comfortable" (Birdpen East of Here Remix)

==== "The Unravelling"/"Racing in the Mire" ====
16 April 2007

Try Harder Records (WORK008)

- A. "The Unravelling"
- AA. "Racing in the Mire"

=== Other releases ===
==== Split 12" With Youthmovie Soundtrack Strategies ====
23 August 2004

Drowned in Sound Recording Label (DiS0006)

- A1. "This City Moans – Redjetson"
- A2. "Divorce – Redjetson"
- AA. "...Spooks The Horse" – Youthmovie Soundtrack Strategies
