= Silent Running (album) =

Studio album by 65daysofstatic
- Released: November 14, 2011
- Genre: Post-rock
- Length: 54:40
- Label: Dustpunk Records
- Producer: 65daysofstatic

65daysofstatic chronology
Heavy Sky (EP) (2010)	Silent Running (2011)	Wild Light (2013)

Professional ratings
Review scores
Source	Rating
AbsolutePunk	(95%)
Sputnikmusic	3.5/5 stars

Silent Running is an album by 65daysofstatic. It is an alternate soundtrack to the 1972 science fiction film, Silent Running. It was originally commissioned by Glasgow Film Festival at the beginning of 2011 as a live re-score performed by the band. In July 2011, the band announced their intention to fund a studio recording of the Silent Running soundtrack by raising $7500 through the crowd-funding website Indiegogo. By the end of the funding period they had raised over $27,000. Silent Running was released in mid-November 2011 as a numbered, limited edition vinyl LP to those Indiegogo funders who had paid for this option, and as a digital download from the band's website.. The digital album is now available on Bandcamp

== Track listing ==
No.	Title	Length
1.	"Overture"	2:28
2.	"Space Theme"	2:08
3.	"The Announcement"	3:10
4.	"Safe Distancing"	4:49
5.	"The Scattered Disk"	3:27
6.	"Burial Scene"	4:36
7.	"Broken Ship Ruse"	6:01
8.	"Surgery"	2:29
9.	"Space Montage"	6:19
10.	"Rantaloupe"	3:49
11.	"Finale"	4:40
Total length:		44:00

Bonus EP
No.	Title	Length
1.	"Save the Forest"	1:49
2.	"Cosmic Wind"	2:58
3.	"Valley Forge Theme"	3:27
4.	"Shovel Fight"	2:24
Total length:		10:40
