= Replicr, 2019 =

replicr, 2019

Studio album by 65daysofstatic
- Released: 27 September 2019
- Genres: Post-rock, electronic, IDM
- Label: Superball Music

65daysofstatic chronology
No Man's Sky: Music for an Infinite Universe (2016)	replicr, 2019 (2019)

replicr, 2019 is the sixth studio album by 65daysofstatic, which was released on 27 September 2019.

== Track listing ==
No.	Title	Length
1.	"pretext"
2.	"stillstellung"
3.	"d|| tl | | |"
4.	"bad age"
5.	"05|| | 1|"
6.	"sister"
7.	"gr[]v-_s"
8.	"popular beats"
9.	"five waves"
10.	"interference_1"
11.	"[]lid"
12.	"z03"
13.	"u| || | th | r| d"
14.	"trackerplatz"

== Charts ==
Chart (2019)	Peak position
Scottish Albums (Official Charts)	63
