= Document 1 =

EP by House of Brothers
- Released: 4 May 2009
- Genre: Indie pop
- Label: Rough Trade

Professional ratings
Review scores
Source	Rating
Rock Sound	9/10 stars

Document 1 is the second EP by English indie pop band House of Brothers.
