= House of Brothers =

English indie pop band

House of Brothers was an English indie pop band founded by Andrew Jackson. It was originally a solo project by Jackson, whose first EP Deadman was released in 2007. House of Brothers expanded to a full band in early 2008, and released the EP Document 1 to positive reviews.

== Members ==
- Andrew Jackson
- Mathew Pugh
- Luke J. Moss
- Peter Banks

== Discography ==
- Deadman (EP, Big Scary Monsters, 2007)
- Document 1 (EP, Rough Trade, 2009)
