= Youthmovies =

English rock band

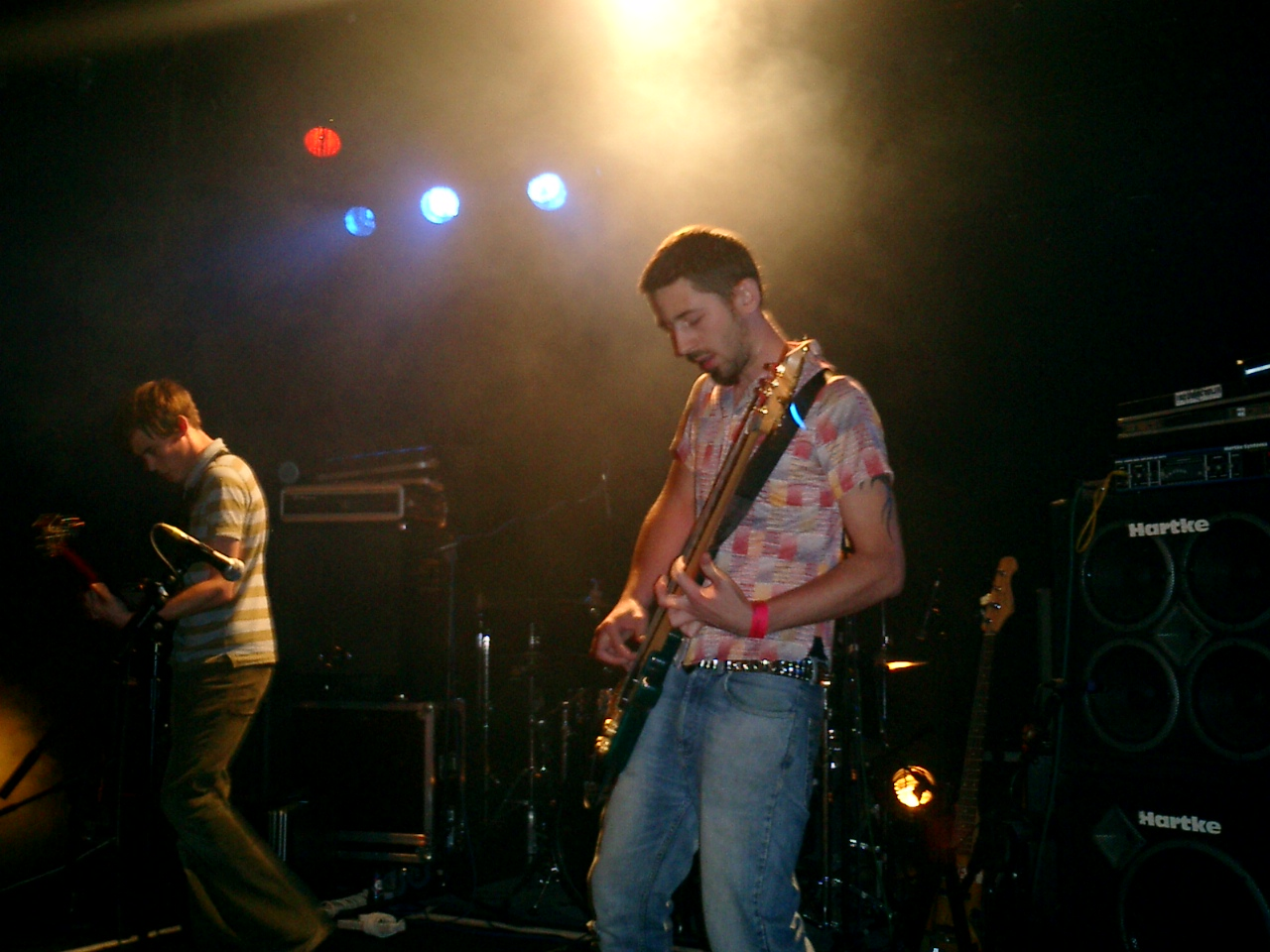
- Andrew Mears and Stephen Hammond of Youthmovie Soundtrack Strategies on stage at the Institute of Contemporary Arts, London, in July 2004

Background information
- Also known as: Youthmovie Soundtrack Strategies, YMSS, Youm
- Origin: Oxford, England, United Kingdom
- Genres: Math rock (early years); Post-rock; Progressive rock
- Years active: 2002–2010
- Labels: Blast First Petite; Drowned in Sound; Try Harder Records; Fierce Panda; Vacuous Pop; Quickfix
- Past members: Andrew Mears; Al English; Stephen Hammond; Samuel Hudson Scott; Simon Jones; Graeme Murray
- Website: http://www.myspace.com/whyyoum

Youthmovies (previously known as YMSS or Youthmovie Soundtrack Strategies) were an English rock band active from 2002 to 2010. They consisted of Andrew Mears (guitar and vocals), Al English (guitar), Graeme Murray (drums), Stephen Hammond (bass) and Sam Scott (brass and keys).

== History ==
Simon Jones, drummer for the band Hope of the States, originally played drums in Youthmovies. Prior to Hope of the States being signed to Sony BMG in 2004, Jones was replaced by Graeme Murray.

Their early sound touched upon noise, brooding soundscapes, samples, feedback, and drone, though their mini-album Hurrah! Another Year, Surely This One Will Be Better Than the Last; The Inexorable March of Progress Will Lead Us All to Happiness and the subsequent single "Ores" suggested they were moving into a more ambitious and musically accomplished sound.

The band toured extensively with Hope of the States, Pioneers Press author Adam Gnade, 65daysofstatic and ¡Forward, Russia!. They also played at the Truck Festival, Latitude Festival, All Tomorrow's Parties, Bestival, Cambridge Film Festival and the Reading and Leeds festivals.

In October 2007, the band released a 5-track CD EP in collaboration with Adam Gnade entitled Honey Slides on guitarist Al English's label Try Harder.

Between April and June 2007, the band recorded their first full-length album, Good Nature, at the Seamus Wong studio in Leicester, released on Drowned in Sound Recordings on 17 March 2008. Ant Theaker, former guitarist with Hope of the States, produced the album, which was mixed at the Strongroom Studios in east London, and mastered in Chicago by Bob Weston of Shellac. The album introduced "a new attention to melody" and was the first recording to feature the trumpet playing of Sam Scott.

In December 2009, the band announced that they had split. The last tour happened in March 2010 with performances in England and Scotland along with their regular collaborator, Adam Gnade.

In October 2017, the band announced a one-off reunion show, which was to take place in March 2018 in Oxford. After the show sold out in under an hour, a second date was announced. Both shows were fundraisers for The Brain Tumour Charity.

The band reunited on August 2026 for two shows in Oxford and Bristol, at ArcTanGent Festival. In October 2026 they played two final shows in Manchester and London at Oslo in Hackney. There are no current plans for the band to make new music or tour beyond these dates.

== Discography ==
=== Albums ===
- Good Nature (Drowned in Sound Recordings, released 17 March 2008)

=== EPs ===
- Let's Get Going... You're Fracturing Me With This Misery (Quickfix Recordings, 2003)
- Hurrah! Another Year, Surely This One Will Be Better Than the Last; The Inexorable March of Progress Will Lead Us All to Happiness (Fierce Panda, August 2004)
- Honey Slides (Try Harder Records, collaboration with Adam Gnade released September 2007)
- Polyp (Blast First Petite (featuring guest spots by Adam Gnade and members of 65daysofstatic and Blanket released November 2008)

=== Singles ===
- "Ores" (Fierce Panda) (April 2005)

=== CDRs ===
- Homeless Musics I (October 2005)
- Homeless Musics II (2006)
- Homeless Musics III (2006)
