= Pioneers Press =

American independent publishing house

Pioneers Press was an independent publishing house founded in 2012 by Jessie Duke, the former owner and manager of Portland-based publisher Microcosm Publishing. Pioneers Press was based in Ann Arbor, Michigan, with its distribution center on a farm outside the town of Leavenworth, Kansas. According to its website, Pioneers Press focused "on survival and sustainability on the farm and in the city, in addition to health, gender, sexuality, social justice and food movements, and literary works by up-and-coming authors." Called "the certifiably badass bookbinders from the prairies of Kansas" by Fast Company magazine, the press has released titles that have made the best-seller lists of various independent bookstores, including Powell's Books' #1 best-selling small press title of 2013, 2014, 2015, and 2017 The Do-It-Yourself Guide to Fighting the Big Motherf*ckin' Sad). The press was also called by Entropy Mag one of the "Best Small Presses of 2015". Pioneers Press closed on December 31, 2020 without citing a reason, only Duke saying "I'm not really up for talking about this right now" and without further notices or updates.
