= Microcosm Publishing =

American independent publisher and distributor

- Status: Active
- Founded: c. 1996
- Founder: Joe Biel
- Country of origin: United States
- Headquarters location: Portland, Oregon
- Distribution: United States: Self-distributed; Canada: UTP; Australia: NewSouth Books; Europe: Turnaround Publisher Services; India, South America, Asia, and Africa: GPS.
- Publication types: Books, zines
- Official website: microcosmpublishing.com

Microcosm Publishing is an independent publisher and distributor based in Portland, Oregon.

== History ==
Microcosm Publishing was founded in 1996 by Joe Biel as a distributor of zines, records, and books. Initially based in Biel's Cleveland Ohio residence, the company relocated to Portland, Oregon, in 1998. Four years later, it was picked up by the National Book Network and began to solely focus on the distribution of printed media.

Microcosm publishes and distributes US-printed books to the marginalized population. The company seeks to prioritize hiring special needs employees. In 2022-2024 Microcosm was named fastest growing publisher by Publishers Weekly.

Microcosm Publishing calls itself a vertically integrated publishing house, offering readers books to help them make changes in their lives and in the world around them.

=== Website ===
Microcosm has a brightly colored punk style website where one can find a blog by the owners in addition to finding a wide variety of books including an entire page just for books with just "One Copy Left" (also called "Last Chance")
