= Drowned in Sound =

British music webzine

- Website type: Online music magazine
- Available in: English
- Owner: Sean Adams
- Creator: Sean Adams
- Website: drownedinsound.com drownedinsound.org
- Registration: No
- Launched: 1998; 28 years ago
- Current status: Active

Drowned in Sound (sometimes abbreviated to DiS) is a UK-based music webzine. Founded by editor Sean Adams, the site features reviews, news, interviews, and discussion forums.

== History ==
DiS began as an email fanzine in 1998 called The Last Resort, but was relaunched by founder and editor Sean Adams as Drowned in Sound in 2000. It was mostly based on contributions from unpaid writers and has an integrated forum to allow for discussion and comments on interviews, news, and reviews. The website also included a user-rated database of artists and bands as well as details for most live music venues in the UK. In 2005, Drowned in Sound launched a podcast called Drowned in Sound Radio. The site also launched a label, Drowned in Sound Recordings, in 2004; which released albums for a few bands, including Brett Anderson, Emily Haines, Jeniferever, Martha Wainwright, Metric, Redjetson, the Stills, ThisGirl, and Youthmovies.

In November 2007, Drowned in Sound teamed up with ad-supported download site RCRDLBL.com to launch an audio and video blog, entitled "Drownload". Since 2008, Drowned in Sound was involved with the Summer Sundae festival, and in 2010, it kicked off their 10th anniversary celebrations with a line-up headlined by the Futureheads and Frightened Rabbit. Previously, they hosted the Friday night billing of the Rising Stage as being presented in partnership with Drowned in Sound.

=== Shutdown and relaunch ===
In April 2019, Pitchfork reported the closure of the site following a Facebook post by Adams. While the editorial content of the site stopped, the community forums remained active. In March 2023, Adams launched a podcast under the site name. It later extended to a newsletter, record label, and a full new website with editorial content.

== Ownership ==
Drowned in Sound is now fully independent, owned by the site founder. Previously, a percentage of the website DrownedinSound.com and the Drowned in Sound Recordings record label was owned by Silentway Ltd. It had a short-lived partnership with Rupert Murdoch's BSkyB, which ended by mutual consent in August 2008, resulting in the majority of staff being laid off.

== Awards ==
On 19 March 2006, The Observer's Music Monthly ranked DrownedinSound.com 9th on its list of top 25 websites. In November 2006, it passed the 150,000 unique readers a week mark and was nominated in the Best Music Website category at the 2007 PLUG Awards and the Best Website category at the 2007 Shockwaves NME Awards. The site and a handful of its writers received nominations at the 2006 Record of the Day awards, held in London on 21 November 2006. The site won in the category of Best Podcast and finished runner-up in the category of Best Website for the second year running. In September 2007, DiS was nominated in two categories at the annual BT Digital Music Awards for Best Music Magazine and Best Podcast (audio). In November 2007, DiS was named Best Online Music Publication at the annual Record of the Day awards. In 2010, Drowned in Sound won Best Publication at the Record of the Day awards.
