= March on Electric Children =

Studio album by The Blood Brothers
- Released: February 25, 2002
- Genres: Sass, post-hardcore
- Length: 24:38
- Labels: Three One G Epitaph (reissue)
- Producer: Matt Bayles

The Blood Brothers chronology
This Adultery Is Ripe (2000)	March on Electric Children (2002)	...Burn, Piano Island, Burn (2003)

Professional ratings
Review scores
Source	Rating
AllMusic	4/5 stars
Stylus Magazine	A−

March on Electric Children is the second studio album by the American post-hardcore band The Blood Brothers, released in February 2002. Produced by Matt Bayles, the album (which is described in the liner notes as a "short story set to music") was recorded in one week on a $3000 budget and has been described by singer Jordan Blilie as "crazier" and "more complex" than the band's previous effort, This Adultery Is Ripe.

== Concept album ==
The album has been described by numerous critics as a concept album, with its characters portrayed more as villains and victims than as heroes. The effort was an attempt by the band to create a storyline with repeating characters that has a bleak outlook on life, emphasizing the consequences of the characters' selfish choices. A common motif utilized throughout the album is the ocean and sea creatures, which was a result of vocalist Johnny Whitney taking an oceanography class during the album's production. The album marks additions to the band's songwriting tools. For example, "Kiss of the Octopus" samples "The Perfect Drug" by Nine Inch Nails, and the piano acts as the sole instrument played on "American Vultures". It is also the conclusion to the storyline and wraps up the themes featured in the previous songs. Says singer Jordan Blilie:

Basically what we had in mind was that we wanted to focus on what happens when a person lives a life devoid of any real meaning. These are people that lead a very empty superficial existence where motives are completely selfish and empty, and what happens as a result of that choice.

— Jordan Blilie in an interview with webzine bettawreckonize.com

=== Characters ===
- Mr. Electric Ocean - "the personification of the media and exploitation and superficiality... the person that influences the protagonist during the entire record"
- The Skin Army - "a representation of our culture as completely superficial and concerned with the exterior, skin, and what is on the outside"

== Track listing ==
All tracks are written by The Blood Brothers.

No.	Title	Length
1.	"Birth Skin/Death Leather"	1:43
2.	"Meet Me at the Water Front After the Social"	2:46
3.	"March on Electric Children!"	3:03
4.	"New York Slave"	2:44
5.	"Kiss of the Octopus"	2:39
6.	"Siamese Gun"	3:21
7.	"Mr. Electric Ocean"	2:16
8.	"Junkyard J. vs. the Skin Army Girlz/High Fives, LA Hives"	2:57
9.	"American Vultures"	3:27

== Personnel ==
The Blood Brothers

- Jordan Blilie - vocals
- Mark Gajadhar - drums
- Morgan Henderson - bass, sampler, M1
- Cody Votolato - guitar
- Johnny Whitney - vocals, piano

Production and design

- Matt Bayles - producer, engineer, mixer
- The Blood Brothers - co-producer
- Troy T - assistant engineer
- Ed B - mastering
- Dan Dean - layout concept, design, photographs, art
- Morgan Henderson - layout concept, design, photographs, art
- Jeffrey Degolier - photographs, art

== Release history ==
Region	Date	Label	Format	Catalog	Additional Notes
United States	2002	Three One G	CD	Three One G 21	
United States	2002	Three One G	LP	Three One G 21	Pressed on black vinyl and clear with black splatters, the latter an edition of 500. A picture disc edition was also issued in quantities of 2500 copies.
United States	2009	Epitaph Records	CD	87056-2	
