= This Adultery Is Ripe =

Studio album by The Blood Brothers
- Released: May 8, 2000
- Recorded: December 10–12, 1999
- Studio: Studio Litho (Seattle, Washington)
- Genre: Post-hardcore
- Length: 21:47
- Label: Second Nature
- Producer: Matt Bayles, The Blood Brothers

The Blood Brothers chronology
This Adultery Is Ripe (2000)	March on Electric Children (2002)

Professional ratings
Review scores
Source	Rating
AllMusic	4/5 stars

This Adultery Is Ripe is the debut studio album by the American post-hardcore band The Blood Brothers. The album was released on May 8, 2000. Produced by Matt Bayles, this album was recorded over a weekend on a limited budget, and has been described as "stripped-down" and catchy by singer Jordan Blilie The artwork to This Adultery Is Ripe is almost entirely composed of pictures taken from the 1967 film The Graduate, which is described as a "cinematic masterpiece" in the liner notes.

== Track listing ==
All tracks are written by The Blood Brothers.

No.	Title	Length
1.	"Rescue"	2:06
2.	"Doctor! Doctor!"	3:29
3.	"The Face in the Embryo"	2:21
4.	"James Brown"	1:05
5.	"Mutiny on the Ark of the Blood Brothers"	2:09
6.	"Jordan Blilie Pets the Wild Horse's Mane"	1:47
7.	"Marooned on Piano Island"	1:55
8.	"This Adultery Is Ripe"	1:37
9.	"Time for Tenderness"	3:24
10.	"Jennifer"	1:54
Total length:		21:47

== Personnel ==
The Blood Brothers

- Jordan Blilie – vocals
- Mark Gajadhar – drums
- Morgan Henderson – bass
- Cody Votolato – guitar
- Johnny Whitney – vocals

Production and design

- Matt Bayles – producer
- The Blood Brothers – co-producer
- Dan Dean – design
- Ian Bartholomew – photography

== Release history ==
Region	Date	Label	Format	Catalog	Additional Notes
United States	2000	Second Nature Recordings	Compact disc	SN022	
United States	2000	Hopscotch	LP	Hopscotch #14	Pressed twice, first on black vinyl, second on white. Total amounts unknown.
United States	2000	Sound Virus	LP	Sound Virus #1	116 clear vinyl copies, unknown amount of black vinyl copies.
