= Crimes (album) =

Studio album by The Blood Brothers
- Released: October 12, 2004
- Recorded: March–April 2004
- Studio: Robert Lang Studios (Seattle, Washington)
- Genres: Post-hardcore, sass
- Length: 39:04
- Labels: V2; Epitaph (reissue)
- Producer: John Goodmanson

The Blood Brothers chronology
...Burn, Piano Island, Burn (2003)	Crimes (2004)	Love Rhymes with Hideous Car Wreck (2005)

Professional ratings
Aggregate scores
Source	Rating
Metacritic	85/100
Review scores
Source	Rating
AllMusic	4/5 stars
Alternative Press	5/5 stars
Blender	3.5/5 stars
Drowned in Sound	9/10
NME	8/10
Pitchfork	7.5/10
Playlouder	4.5/5 stars
Rolling Stone	3/5 stars
Spin	A−
URB	4/5 stars

Crimes is the fourth studio album by the American band The Blood Brothers, released on October 12, 2004, by V2 Records. It was the band's first major label album. Produced by John Goodmanson, the album was recorded in two months in the band's hometown of Seattle.

== Background ==
The Blood Brothers chose John Goodmanson as producer because they were fans of his work with Unwound, particularly 1996's Repetition.

== Lyrical content and cover art ==
Much of the lyrics for the album are a political reaction to the mass media and the military policy of the Bush administration, inspired heavily by the election year of 2004. "I thought the collective dissent of our generation would bring about positive change. When that didn't happen I felt like the bottom had fallen out," vocalist Jordan Blilie commented.

- "Feed Me to the Forest" is "a picture of the hyper-industrialized times we live in".
- "Trash Flavored Trash" is "about the emptiness of news media".
- "Teen Heat" is about the distribution company Artistdirect with whom the band was having difficulties at the time.
- "Celebrator" and "Devastator" are direct criticisms of the United States' military campaigns in Iraq and Afghanistan.

According to Blilie, this theming extended to the album art, which depicts "the devastating effects of a system based on money and greed" in the form of "these sort of pathetic little drawings of people with diamonds in their eyes".

== Track listing ==
All songs written by The Blood Brothers.

1. "Feed Me to the Forest" – 2:23
2. "Trash Flavored Trash" – 2:38
3. "Love Rhymes with Hideous Car Wreck" – 3:14
4. "Peacock Skeleton with Crooked Feathers" – 4:31
5. "Teen Heat" – 2:07
6. "Rats and Rats and Rats for Candy" – 3:52
7. "Crimes" – 4:00
8. "My First Kiss at the Public Execution" – 2:50
9. "Live at the Apocalypse Cabaret" – 3:12
10. "Beautiful Horses" – 1:47
11. "Wolf Party" – 3:28
12. "Celebrator" – 2:16
13. "Devastator" – 2:45

2009 reissue bonus tracks

1. "Ladies and Gentlemen" - 2:46
2. "Metronomes" - 4:55
3. "Crimes (alt. version)" - 3:55
4. "Peacock Skeleton With Crooked Feathers (alt. version)" - 3:30
5. "Love Rhymes With Hideous Car Wreck (live)" - 3:21
6. "Trash Flavored Trash - Live" (Reading Festival 2005) - 2:44
7. "Peacock Skeleton With Crooked Feathers - Live" (Reading Festival 2005) - 4:39
8. "My First Kiss at the Public Execution - Live" (Reading Festival 2005) - 2:35
9. "Live at the Apocalypse Cabaret - Live" (Reading Festival 2005) - 3:45
10. "Rats and Rats and Rats for Candy - Live" (Reading Festival 2005) - 4:04
11. "Teen Heat - Live" (Reading Festival 2005) - 2:02

=== Album leak ===
The album was originally leaked as a 19-track unmastered CD. The following tracks were on the leaked version but not the final version of the album:

- "Ladies and Gentlemen" (also known as "Champagne Party")
- "Metronomes"
- "Wolf Faced Gladiators" (also known as "Gladiators")
- "Crimes (Alternate Version)"
- "Rats And Rats And Rats For Candy (Acoustic Riff)"
- "Noise"

Of the cut tracks, "Ladies and Gentlemen". "Metronomes" and the alternate version of "Crimes" were released on the band's Love Rhymes With Hideous Car Wreck EP released in 2006.

== Personnel ==
The Blood Brothers

- Jordan Blilie - vocals, guitar, percussion
- Mark Gajadhar - drums and percussion
- Morgan Henderson - bass guitar, guitar, upright bass, synthesizer, accordion, piano, laptop, backing vocals
- Cody Votolato - guitar, trumpet, backing vocals, percussion, whistle, E-Bow, baritone guitar
- Johnny Whitney - vocals, piano, Wurlitzer electric piano, Farfisa organ, percussion

Additional performers

- Nick Zinner - guitars on "Wolf Party"

Production and design

- John Goodmanson - producer, recording, mixer, engineer
- The Blood Brothers - co-producer
- Kip Beelman - engineer
- Justin Armstrong - assistant
- Jakael Trinstram - assistant
- Aaron Malasko - drum technician
- Johnny Whitney - layout
- Jordan Blilie - drawings

== Vinyl information ==
First pressing: 333 copies

- 333 light blue/white marble with black labels and screen-printed cover (hand numbered) (20 of these are screened specially – pink ink goes light to dark from left to right)

Second pressing: 3,050 copies

- 508 dark red
- 503 white
- 513 light blue
- 510 purple/white marble
- 510 pink
- 508 orange

Third pressing: 979 copies

- 501 light green
- 478 grey

Fourth pressing: 1,014 copies

- 338 half translucent green/half white
- 338 translucent dark blue
- 338 black/light blue/light pink tri-color

Fifth pressing:

- 510 grey/pink/black marble

Sixth pressing

- yellow
