= Young Machetes =

Studio album by The Blood Brothers
- Released: October 10, 2006
- Studio: Robert Lang (Shoreline, Washington)
- Genre: Post-hardcore
- Length: 50:55
- Labels: V2 Records; Epitaph (reissue)
- Producers: Guy Picciotto; John Goodmanson

The Blood Brothers chronology
Love Rhymes with Hideous Car Wreck (2005)	Young Machetes (2006)

Singles from Young Machetes
- 1. "Laser Life" Released: 2006; 2. "Set Fire to the Face on Fire" Released: 2007

Professional ratings
Aggregate scores
Source	Rating
Metacritic	76/100
Review scores
Source	Rating
AbsolutePunk.net	(90%)
AllMusic	4/5 stars
Pitchfork Media	(6.2/10)
Punknews.org	4/5 stars
Stylus	(B)
Kerrang!	5/5 stars

Young Machetes is the fifth and final studio album by the American post-hardcore band The Blood Brothers, which was released October 10, 2006. Lyrically, the album "remains firmly rooted in the surreal consciousness, rage and oblique politics the Blood Brothers have always embraced. It also reveals a new, once-bitten wisdom." Heather Phares of Allmusic said of the album:

... the Blood Brothers find sneakier ways of incorporating their twisted pop skills into the fray. There's no denying the hooks on "Rat Rider" nor the jaunty keyboards on "Laser Life," while "Camouflage, Camouflage"'s breakdown recalls the noise-meets-glam-rock flair of Johnny Whitney and Mark Gajadhar's side project, Neon Blonde. Nevertheless, Young Machetes' more challenging tracks are some of the most satisfying ...

— Heather Phares, Allmusic Review For Young Machetes

== Track listing ==
1. "Set Fire to the Face on Fire" - 2:19
2. "We Ride Skeletal Lightning" - 3:22
3. "Laser Life" - 2:44
4. "Camouflage, Camouflage" - 4:54
5. "You're the Dream Unicorn!" - 2:18
6. "Vital Beach" - 2:35
7. "Spit Shine Your Black Clouds" - 4:20
8. "1, 2, 3, 4 Guitars" - 3:35
9. "Lift the Veil, Kiss the Tank" - 4:05
10. "Nausea Shreds Yr Head" - 2:10
11. "Rat Rider" - 2:03
12. "Johnny Ripper" - 2:39
13. "Huge Gold AK-47" - 2:31
14. "Street Wars/Exotic Foxholes" - 5:31
15. "Giant Swan" - 5:51

2009 re-issue bonus tracks

1. "Laser Life (Nick Zinner Remix)" - 2:49
2. "Nausea Shreds Yr Head (Gajamagic remix)" - 2:47
3. "Street Wars/Exotic Foxholes - (Gajamagic remix)" - 3:45
4. "We Ride Skeletal Lightning" - Live (KXLU 2006) - 3:31
5. "Laser Life" - Live (KXLU 2006) - 2:43
6. "Camouflage, Camouflage" - Live (KXLU 2006) - 4:59
7. "Lift the Veil, Kiss the Tank" - Live (KXLU 2006) - 4:04
8. "Vital Beach" - Live (KXLU 2006) - 2:34
9. "You're the Dream Unicorn!" - Live (KXLU 2006) - 2:11
10. "Giant Swan" - Live (KXLU 2006) - 5:48

== Vinyl releases ==
First Press:

800 - 180 Gram Black
440 - Black/White
440 - Translucent Blue/Black Splatter
440 - LP1: Green/Grey, LP2: Orange/Yellow
440 - Metallic Grey
440 - White

Second Press:

361 - Light Blue
354 - Orange/Black Splatter
362 - Half Black/Half White/Red Splatter

== Personnel ==
=== Performers ===
- Jordan Blilie - vocals
- Mark Gajadhar - drums
- Morgan Henderson - bass, keyboards
- Cody Votolato - guitar
- Johnny Whitney - vocals, Wurlitzer piano, guitar
