= Telekinesis (disambiguation) =

Telekinesis is a term used in parapsychology as either an alternate for psychokinesis or as the name of a specialty ability under the umbrella term of psychokinesis, to refer to using the power of the mind to cause the movement of matter at a distance.

Telekinesis may also refer to:

- Telekinesis (band), an indie rock band based in Seattle, Washington
  - Telekinesis!, the debut album by the band Telekinesis
- Telekinesis (comics), a DC Comics superhero
- "Telekinesis" (song), by Travis Scott featuring SZA and Future
- "Telekinesis", a 2010 song by Ne-Yo from his album Libra Scale
