= Evil Island (band) =

American post-hardcore supergroup

- Origin: Seattle, Washington, U.S.
- Genres: Post-hardcore, screamo
- Years active: 2025–present
- Label: Blowed Out
- Spinoff of: The Blood Brothers
- Members: Johnny Whitney; Cody Votolato; Mark Gajadhar; Autry René Fulbright II; Todd Weinstock

Evil Island is an American post-hardcore supergroup formed in Seattle, Washington, in October 2025. The supergroup was formed by Johnny Whitney, Cody Votolato, and Mark Gajadhar, with Autry René Fulbright II joining immediately after formation. The lineup consists of Johnny Whitney, (vocals) Cody Votolato, (vocals, guitar) Mark Gajadhar, (drums, percussion) Autry René Fulbright II, (bass) and Todd Weinstock (guitar). The supergroup features current and former members from The Blood Brothers, OFF!, ...And You Will Know Us by the Trail of Dead, and Glassjaw. The supergroup is currently signed to Blowed Out Records.

The supergroup released their first single, "Tiger Baby", alongside its music video on April 15, 2026. It is the lead single and the fourth track on Side A of their upcoming album, Terraform the Afterlife. Whitney has described the single as "heavy crazy, and chaotic" on Lambgoat. The single was produced by Ross Robinson. The supergroup afterwards released their second single "Animal" along with the single's music video on June 2, 2026, featuring a ferociously chaotic style. It is the third track on their upcoming album. Whitney described the track as a song that "could be blasted through the PA at a football stadium". On the following day, Evil Island also announced their upcoming album.

The album, Terraform the Afterlife, will feature contributions from Alexis Krauss from Sleigh Bells, Michael Gatto from XCOMM, Guy Picciotto from Fugazi, and Jordan Blilie from The Blood Brothers. In the limited-edition vinyl, album is divided into a 7-track Side A and a 6-track Side B. The album is scheduled for release on August 14, 2026.

== History ==
=== Formation ===
Evil Island was formed by vocalist Johnny Whitney, guitarist Cody Votolato, and drummer Mark Gajadhar following the conclusion of The Blood Brothers' 2024 reunion tour. Whitney noted that they wrote eleven songs before hiring producer Ross Robinsonand recruiting bassist Autry René Fulbright. The supergroup announced the formation to the public via an Instagram broadcast on 13 October 2025. On 15 May 2026, the supergroup announced the recruitment of a second guitarist, former Glassjaw member Todd Weinstock.

== Discography ==
=== Studio albums ===
- Terraform the Afterlife (2026)

=== Singles & EPs ===
| Title | Year | Type |
|---|---|---|
| "Tiger Baby" | 2026 | Single |
| "Animal" | 2026 | Single |
