= Strange Symmetry =

EP by Past Lives
- Released: August 4, 2008
- Recorded: 2008
- Studio: Jupiter Studios; Avast! Studios
- Genre: Post-punk, post-hardcore, experimental rock
- Length: 15:11
- Label: Suicide Squeeze Records (S-071)

Past Lives chronology
Strange Symmetry (2008)	Tapestry of Webs (2010)

Professional ratings
Review scores
Source	Rating
Allmusic	Not rated
Spectrum Culture	3/5 stars
Punknews.org	3.5/5 stars
Sputnikmusic	4.5/5 stars

Strange Symmetry is the debut EP by Past Lives, released in 2008 by Suicide Squeeze Records.

== Reception ==
The EP received positive reviews from critics. Jim Allen of Allmusic states that the EP ranges between "raw, garagey punk explosions" and "quirky, angular, post-punk-influenced creep-rock nuggets" with "a dark, edgy feel". Chris Middleman of Spectrum Culture describes the EP as "more interesting musically" than Jaguar Love, maintaining its post-punk feel. Sputnik Music describes the EP as an "outstanding debut" with "just enough of a taste to leave listeners dying for what a full length album will sound like". Scott Gray of Exclaim! states that the EP sounds "like a natural enough progression from Young Machetes" with "enough fresh perspective on instrumentation and melodic impetus" to establish the band as a distinct entity. Clash states that the songs of the EP "pack a much rawer punch, having more in common with Fugazi and Hüsker Dü" compared to "Jaguar Love's many-layered arrangements". Jonah Flicker of Blurt states that the EP proves that Past Lives sounds more interesting and arguably closer to the style of Blood Brothers.

== Track listing ==
1. "Beyond Gone" - 2:54
2. "Strange Symmetry" - 3:07
3. "Skull Lender" - 2:40
4. "Reverse The Curse" - 2:38
5. "Chrome Life" - 3:55

== Personnel ==
Past Lives

- Jordan Blilie - Vocals
- Mark Gajadhar - Drums
- Morgan Henderson - Baritone Guitar, Keyboards
- Devin Welch - Guitar

Other personnel

- Dann Gallucci - engineering and mixing
