= Chandeliers in the Savannah =

Studio album by Neon Blonde
- Released: 13 September 2005
- Genre: Art punk Post-hardcore
- Length: 34 minutes
- Label: Dim Mak
- Producer: Joel Brown

Professional ratings
Review scores
Source	Rating
Allmusic	4.5/5 stars
Pitchfork Media	(7.7/10)
Sputnikmusic	4.5/5 stars

Chandeliers in the Savannah is Neon Blonde's debut album, released September 13, 2005.

== Track listing ==
1. "Black Cactus Killers" - 2:34
2. "Crystal Beaches Never Turned Me On" - 2:51
3. "Chandeliers and Vines" - 4:07
4. "Princess Skullface Sings" - 2:30
5. "New Detroit" - 2:50
6. "Headlines" - 3:23
7. "Love Hounds" - 3:27
8. "Dead Mellotron" - 2:37
9. "Cherries in Slow Motion" - 4:02
10. "The Future is a Mesh Stallion" - 3:47
11. "Wings Made out of Noise" - 2:21

== Notes ==
The music video for "Headlines" features marionette versions of the band performing the song.

Aside from performing the vocals for the band, Johnny Whitney plays the guitar, bass, keyboard, and piano as well as drum programming.
