= Inborn =

INBORN! is an electro-rock band issued from Luxembourg. Since their creation in 2002, the band has been composed of Arthur Glass (Vocals, Guitars, synthesizers), Ben Thommes (Guitars), Jeff Braun (Bass), Max Thommes (Drums, Programming, Vocals), Jan Kerscher (since 2010, Rhodes, Vocals) and Claude Meisch (until 2005, Percussion). The band has so far released two albums as well as two EP's.

== Early Years (2003-2009) ==
Right after their formation, INBORN! gathered a lot of media exposure since they won the Emergenza contest for Luxembourg and Belgium in 2003. The band was very quickly considered as one of the hottest newcomers around and started performing extensively in Luxembourg, Germany, Belgium and France. Two years later, in 2005, they released their first studio album, 'The Headtrance Session'. Following the numerous experimental sounds pursued on their first LP, the band explored a more raw and stripped down approach in their music leading to their second album Chef d'Oeuvre, released in 2007 on the independent label 'Finest Noise Records'. Influenced by the Stooges and abrasive post-hardcore like Converge and The Blood Brothers, the record yet failed to provoke any significant reaction.

== En Vogue EP (2010) ==
In the course of a secret recording at Jan Kerscher's Ghostcity Studios the band decided to maneuver the collective sound into new territories creating a style labelled by some critics as ‘21st century dance rock’ or even ‘progressive disco’. The release of the En Vogue EP and the single 'Trash is the New Glam' were finally released in April 2010. From then INBORN! gathered a lot of attention arousing the interest of American producer Ross Robinson allowing the band to enter his studio in September 2010 to record their first official LP.

== Discography ==
=== The band formerly known as Inborn ===
The Headtrance Session (2005)

Chef d'Oeuvre (2007)

=== INBORN! ===
En Vogue EP (2010)

PERSONA (2011)
