= SeeYouSpaceCowboy =

American hardcore punk band

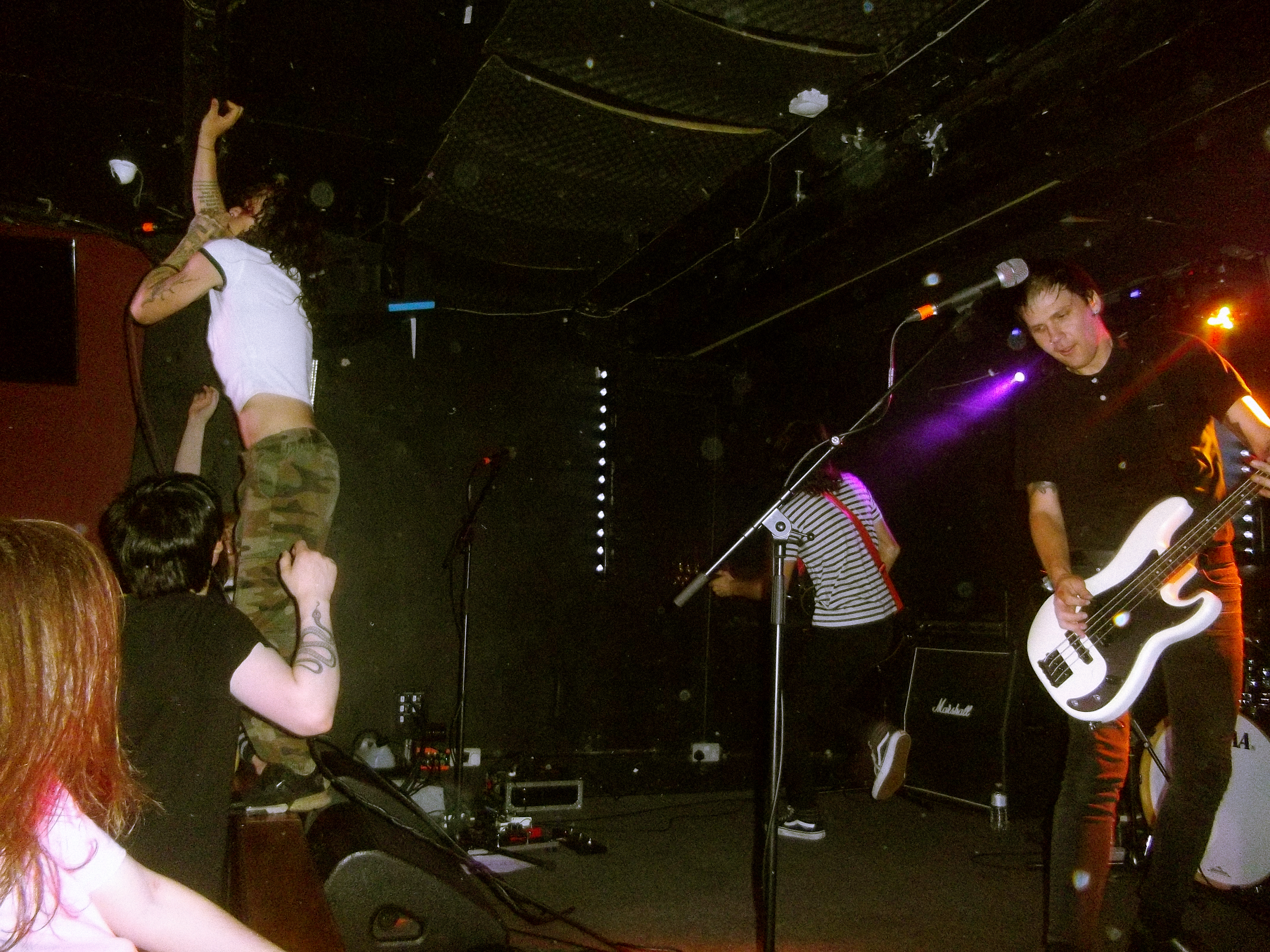
- SeeYouSpaceCowboy performing live in 2022

Background information
- Origin: San Diego, California, U.S.
- Genres: Metalcore; pop screamo; mathcore; sass (early)
- Years active: 2016–2026 (Inactive)
- Label: Pure Noise
- Members: Ethan Sgarbossa; Taylor Allen; Timmy Moreno; AJ Tartol
- Past members: Dominick Larocca; Cameron Phipps; Andrew Milam; Liam Coombe; Bryan Prosser; Jesse Price; Sal Argento; Connie Sgarbossa
- Website: syscband.com

SeeYouSpaceCowboy (formerly stylized as SeeYouSpaceCowboy...) is an American hardcore punk band formed in San Diego, California, in 2016, by Connie Sgarbossa, Ethan Sgarbossa and Taylor Allen. Their name is taken from a phrase shown on many of the end title cards of the 1998 anime Cowboy Bebop.

== History ==
=== 2016–2018: Formation and early releases ===
Before the formation of SeeYouSpaceCowboy, vocalist Connie Sgarbossa and her younger brother Ethan Sgarbossa both played in the bands Flowers Taped to Pens and René Descartes. Ethan originally played guitar for both groups before switching to drums for SeeYouSpaceCowboy. Taylor Allen and Jesse Price played together in a hardcore band called Recluse before the formation of their next project, Letters to Catalonia, which features Jesse on vocals and guitar, and fellow former SeeYouSpaceCowboy member, Dominic Larocca, on bass. SeeYouSpaceCowboy formed in 2016, before Connie relocated to Oakland.

The original lineup, and that which appears on the demo, consisted of only four members; Price playing bass and Allen playing guitar. Timmy Moreno was soon added as a bassist, and Price went on to be a guitarist.

=== 2018–2020: Songs for the Firing Squad and The Correlation Between Entrance and Exit Wounds ===
In a 2018 interview with Revolver the band revealed that they had plans to release a debut full-length album sometime in 2019, the group were in the writing stage as of when the interview was taken place in August. Connie Sgarbossa hinted of what is to come: "There's going to be sassing, there's going to be breakdowns ... there's going to be weird, screechy shit."

As of January 25, 2019 it was revealed the band had signed to Pure Noise Records, speaking about their new partnership with Pure Noise Records, the band said: “We are beyond happy to be part of the Pure Noise family. After a summer of searching, we decided to go with Pure Noise because of the diverse and innovative roster, a showcase for some of the most exciting bands in the scene. We are very eager to show the world the next chapter of this band, with this great team behind us.“ Alongside the announcement the band digitally released the compilation Songs for the Firing Squad, which the band describes as "a collection of the first two years as a band, along with two new tracks that foreshadow the new direction we are headed." The band also released an accompanying music video for the song “Self Help Specialist Ends Own Life”.

On July 30, 2019, they released a brand new track, "Armed with Their Teeth" and announced the title for their debut full-length record, The Correlation Between Entrance and Exit Wounds. On August 27, 2019, they released another single, "Put On a Show, Don't Let Them See You Fall". The record was released on September 27, 2019, and met with immediately favorable reviews. Loudwire named it one of the 50 best metal albums of 2019.

=== 2021–2022: The Romance of Affliction ===
On November 5, 2021, the band dropped their second studio album, The Romance of Affliction. It was elected by Loudwire as the 36th best rock/metal album of 2021.

On July 19, 2022, the band released a music video for their cover of the Saosin song "Seven Years". The song is featured on the Pure Noise compilation Dead Formats: Volume 1.

=== 2023–2025: Coup de Grâce, Sgarbossa's departure and breakup ===
The band released the single "Chewing the Scenery" on August 24, 2023. The band would release another single, "Rhythm and Rapture", featuring vocals from Nothing,Nowhere, on September 5. On March 5, 2024, SeeYouSpaceCowboy announced its third studio album, Coup de Grâce, set for an April 19 release. The band toured in support of the album with openers The Callous Daoboys and Omerta; Roman Candle was also set to appear on the tour but was dropped following fan backlash due to domestic abuse allegations against former bassist Nico Borgia and the victim claiming Roman Candle knew of the abuse before the allegations became public.

On January 14, 2025, SeeYouSpaceCowboy was announced as a supporting act for Dance Gavin Dance's "Return of the Robot" tour. The tour announcement was met with controversy and backlash from fans of SeeYouSpaceCowboy due to Dance Gavin Dance's handling of former vocalist Tilian Pearson, who was accused of sexual misconduct. Following the tour announcement and subsequent backlash, vocalist Connie Sgarbossa released a series of vague and cryptic posts on social media hinting at her dissatisfaction with the tour and her place in SeeYouSpaceCowboy, and that she may be exiting the band. This was later confirmed three days later as Sgarbossa shared a series of Instagram stories with the first story reading: "I appreciate everyone reaching out. SYSC meant the world to me too. I haven't fully processed what's going on but I am alive as of now."

On January 24, 2025, it was announced that the band would not be touring with Dance Gavin Dance, with no further announcement of the status of the band.

== Politics ==
SeeYouSpaceCowboy looks to create a dialogue with fans regarding LGBTQ representation. Their personal politics also include vegan, anti-racist and anti-capitalist messages. Sgarbossa notes that the quintet hope to bring a zine library on future tours to help spread awareness of their intersectional beliefs.

== Musical style ==
SeeYouSpaceCowboy's musical style has been characterized as metalcore, mathcore and pop screamo. Their early music was sass.

Early on, the band choose to self-describe as sasscore, a name the band originally considered themself to have coined as a portmanteau of the genre names sass music and metalcore. In the following years, the term became a popular synonym for sass music. In 2019, they had considered their sass era to have ended. The band disagrees with the label "screamo"; lead singer Connie Sgarbossa states, "Everybody in this band came from the screamo scene, and we'd been doing it for a minute, but with this band we really wanted to make the distinction that this isn't a screamo band." Songs for the Firing Squad features a song titled "Stop Calling Us Screamo", which Connie Sgarbossa later clarified as "our tongue-in-cheek jab at the people that want to throw us into that scene."

SeeYouSpaceCowboy originally formed with the intention of being a melodic hardcore band inspired by A Better Hope Foundation, the Carrier and Killing the Dream, however their influences quickly shifted to Drop Dead, Gorgeous, Fear Before, Me and Him Call It Us, Heavy Heavy Low Low, the Blood Brothers and I Set My Friends on Fire. Early on in SeeYouSpaceCowboy's career, some members were involved in the band the Shotgun Message, which was influenced by grindcore bands Daughters, the Sawtooth Grin and the Locust. When the Shotgun Message disbanded, these influences became absorded into SeeYouSpaceCowboy, with the band's debut EP Fashion Statements of the Socially Aware (2017) being material originally intended for the Shotgun Message.

Other influences they cited include Loma Prieta, Dance Gavin Dance, Hail the Sun, Norma Jean, Hayworth, the Red-Light Sting and the Cambodian Heat.

== Band members ==
Current Lineup

- Ethan Sgarbossa – drums (2016–2019); guitar, vocals (2019–present)
- Taylor Allen – guitar (2016–2017); bass, clean vocals (2020–present)
- Timmy Moreno – bass (2016–2018); guitar (2021–present)
- AJ Tartol - drums, backing vocals (2021–present)

Past members

- Connie Sgarbossa – lead vocals (2016–2025)
- Jesse Price – bass (2016, 2019) guitar, backing vocals (2016–2020); drums (2019)
- Cameron Phipps – bass (2019–2020)
- Dominick Larocca – guitar (2017–2018)
- Liam Coombe – guitar (2018–2019); bass (2018)
- Andrew Milam – bass (2018–2019)
- Tim Austin - guitar (2020)
- Bryan Prosser – drums (2019)
- Sal Argento - drums (2019–2021)

Timeline

== Discography ==
=== Studio albums ===
Title	Album details
The Correlation Between Entrance and Exit Wounds	Released: September 27, 2019; Label: Pure Noise; Formats: DL, LP, CD
The Romance of Affliction	Released: November 5, 2021; Label: Pure Noise; Formats: DL, LP, CD
Coup de Grâce	Released: April 19, 2024; Label: Pure Noise; Formats: DL, LP, CD

=== Compilation albums ===
Title	Album details
Songs for the Firing Squad	Released: January 25, 2019; Label: Pure Noise; Formats: DL, LP, CD

=== Extended plays ===
Title	Album details	Comments
Demo	Released: December 9, 2016; Label: Self-released; Formats: DL, CS, CD-R	
Fashion Statements of the Socially Aware	Released: June 3, 2017; Label: Structures//Agony Records, React with Protest, Zegema Beach Records, Contrition Records, Middle Man Records, Dog Knight Productions, Really Rad Records; Formats: DL, 7"	
SYSC//SGKF Split (with secondgradeknifefight)	Released: January 23, 2018; Label: Dark Trail Records, RIP In Peace Records, Zegema Beach Records, Longrail Records, Miss the Stars Records, Dingleberry Records, Pattern Recognition Records; Formats: DL, 7", CS	Split EP
A Sure Disaster (with If I Die First)	Released: May 14, 2021; Label: Pure Noise Records; Formats: DL, 12", CS	Split EP

=== Singles ===
Year	Title	Album
2017	"Atrocities from a Story Book Perspective"	Non-album single
2019	"Armed with Their Teeth"	The Correlation Between Entrance and Exit Wounds
2019	“Put On a Show, Don't Let Them See You Fall”	The Correlation Between Entrance and Exit Wounds
2021	"bloodstainedeyes" (with If I Die First)	A Sure Disaster
2021	"A Clear Picture from a Unreliable Narrator"	A Sure Disaster
2021	"Misinterpreting Constellations"	The Romance of Affliction
2021	"Intersecting Storylines to the Same Tragedy"	The Romance of Affliction
2021	"The End to a Brief Moment of Lasting Intimacy"	The Romance of Affliction
2023	"Chewing the Scenery"	Coup de Gráce
2023	"Rhythm and Rapture" (feat. Nothing,Nowhere)	Coup de Gráce
2024	"Respite for a Tragic Tale" (feat. iRis.EXE) / "Silhouettes in Motion"	Coup de Gráce
2024	"To the Dance Floor for Shelter" (feat. Courtney LaPlante)	Coup de Gráce
2024	"Red Wine and Discontent"	Coup de Gráce

=== Music videos ===
Year	Title	Director
2019	"Self Help Specialist Ends Own Life"	Cameron Nunez
2019	"Armed with Their Teeth"	Cameron Nunez
2019	"Late December"	Cameron Nunez
2021	"Bloodstainedeyes"	Cameron Nunez
2021	"Misinterpreting Constellations "	Cameron Nunez
2021	"The End to a Brief Moment of Lasting Intimacy"	Cameron Nunez
2022	"Seven Years"	Cameron Nunez
