= Votolato =

Votolato is a surname. Notable people with the surname include:

- Cody Votolato (born 1982), American rock guitarist
- Rocky Votolato (born 1977), American singer-songwriter
