= Soiled Doves =

American punk rock band

- Origin: Seattle, Washington
- Genres: Post-hardcore, art punk, screamo, experimental rock
- Years active: 2000 – 2001
- Label: Gold Standard Labs
- Past members: Johnny Whitney; Adam Miller; Devin Welch; Hannah Blilie

Soiled Doves was an American post-hardcore band from Seattle active in 2000 and 2001, releasing one album called Soiled Life two years after disbanding. The band formed as dance-punk band The Vogue in the late 1990s, changing their name to Soiled Doves after the departure of keyboardist Casey Wescott, having released one album and a single. The band consisted of Johnny Whitney, Adam Miller, Devin Welch and Hannah Blilie. Members of the band later formed part of various other bands, including The Blood Brothers (Whitney, Welch), Chromatics (Miller, Blilie, Welch), Gossip (Blilie), and Neon Blonde (Whitney).

== Discography ==
=== Albums ===
- Soiled Life CD (2003, Gold Standard Labs)
  1. "Black Cactus Choir" - 2:49
  2. "Death Knell for Paper Children" - 2:36
  3. "Hot Siberian Heart" - 2:39
  4. "Fuck This Nest" - 2:07
  5. "Accelerator" - 1:57
  6. "Soiled Doves" - 3:37
  7. "Hunter Gatherer: The Saga Continues" - 4:09
  8. "Soiled Life" - 6:43

=== Singles ===
- Soiled Doves 7" (2001, King of the Monsters)
