= ...Burn, Piano Island, Burn =

2003 studio album by the Blood Brothers

Studio album by The Blood Brothers
- Released: March 18, 2003
- Recorded: April–June 2002
- Studio: Standard Electric Recorders (Los Angeles, California)
- Genres: Post-hardcore; sass
- Length: 47:46
- Labels: ARTISTdirect; BMG; Epitaph (reissue)
- Producer: Ross Robinson

The Blood Brothers chronology
| March on Electric Children (2002) | ...Burn, Piano Island, Burn (2003) | Crimes (2004) |

Singles from ...Burn, Piano Island, Burn
- 1. "Ambulance vs. Ambulance" Released: March 11, 2003

Professional ratings
Aggregate scores
| Source | Rating |
|---|---|
| Metacritic | 82/100 |
Review scores
| Source | Rating |
| AllMusic | 3/5 stars |
| Alternative Press | 5/5 |
| Blender | 4/5 stars |
| Drowned in Sound | 9/10 |
| Entertainment Weekly | B |
| Mojo | 4/5 stars |
| Pitchfork | 9.1/10 |
| Rolling Stone | 3/5 stars |
| Spin | A− |
| Stylus Magazine | A |

...Burn, Piano Island, Burn is the third full-length studio album by the American post-hardcore band The Blood Brothers, released in March 2003. Produced by Ross Robinson, the album was recorded over two months with a roughly $25,000 budget. The album drew widespread critical acclaim, reflected by an average score 82 on Metacritic.

To promote the album, "Ambulance vs. Ambulance" was released as a single and had a music video produced for it. In 2009, Epitaph Records reissued the album including bonus tracks as well as the Jungle Rules Live DVD packaged with the CD edition.

== Track listing ==
All tracks are written by The Blood Brothers.

| No. | Title | Length |
|---|---|---|
| 1. | "Guitarmy" | 0:39 |
| 2. | "Fucking's Greatest Hits" | 2:59 |
| 3. | "Burn, Piano Island, Burn" | 3:48 |
| 4. | "Every Breath Is a Bomb" | 4:45 |
| 5. | "Ambulance vs. Ambulance" | 2:52 |
| 6. | "USA Nails" | 5:11 |
| 7. | "Cecilia and the Silhouette Saloon" | 4:53 |
| 8. | "Six Nightmares at the Pinball Masquerade" | 4:16 |
| 9. | "The Salesman, Denver Max" | 4:31 |
| 10. | "I Know Where the Canaries and the Crows Go" | 3:26 |
| 11. | "God Bless You, Blood Thirsty Zeppelins" | 4:49 |
| 12. | "The Shame" | 5:34 |

2009 Reissue Bonus Tracks
| No. | Title | Length |
|---|---|---|
| 13. | "Cecilia and the Silhouette Saloon" (Live @ Reading Festival 2005) | 5:03 |
| 14. | "Pink Tarantulas" | 3:37 |
| Total length: | | 56:26 |

== Personnel ==
The Blood Brothers

- Jordan Blilie – vocals
- Mark Gajadhar – drums
- Morgan Henderson – bass, Nord II, piano, G4, vocals
- Cody Votolato – guitar, tractor, vocals
- Johnny Whitney – vocals, guitar on "Salesman, Denver Max", Wurlitzer piano, glockenspiel, lawnmower
- Lenny Castro – percussion
- Chava Mirel, Amy, Carrie – backing vocals

Production and design

- Ross Robinson – producer
- The Blood Brothers – co-producer
- Mike Fraser – engineer, mixer
- Mike Terry – engineer, Pro Tools
- George Marino – mastering
- Yaeger Rosenberg – layout concept and design
- Cody Votolato – layout concept and design
- Johnny Whitney – layout concept and design
- Kirk Huffman – Cursive/Flakiness
- Sean McGahan – Bluest/Love
