= Tapestry of Webs =

Studio album by Past Lives
- Released: February 23, 2010
- Recorded: Late summer / early fall 2009
- Genre: Post-punk, art rock
- Length: 46:01
- Label: Suicide Squeeze Records
- Producer: Steve Fisk

Past Lives chronology
Strange Symmetry EP (2008)	Tapestry of Webs (2010)

Professional ratings
Review scores
Source	Rating
AbsolutePunk	(85%)
AllMusic	3.5/5 stars
Alternative Press	4/5 stars
Pitchfork Media	(7.5/10)
Unrated Magazine	7/10 stars

Tapestry of Webs is the debut studio album by Past Lives. It was released on February 23, 2010. The album was recorded during the late summer and early fall of 2009. Initial tracking took place at Avast! Studios, with vocals and various overdubs at Steve Fisk's house. The album was produced, engineered, and mixed by Steve Fisk. Mastering was done by Ed Brooks at RFI Mastering.

== Track listing ==
1. "Paralyzer" − 4:00
2. "Falling Spikes" − 2:40
3. "Past Lives" − 4:04
4. "Don't Let the Ashes Fill Your Eyes" − 3:26
5. "Deep in the Valley" − 3:56
6. "K Hole" − 4:32
7. "Hex Takes Hold" − 3:52
8. "Vanishing Twin" − 4:14
9. "Hospital White" − 2:52
10. "At Rest" − 2:17
11. "Aerosol Bouquet" − 4:06
12. "There Is a Light So Bright It Blinds" − 6:09

== Personnel ==
=== Band ===
- Jordan Blilie – vocals
- Mark Gajadhar – drums
- Morgan Henderson – baritone guitar, keyboards
- Devin Welch – guitar

Additional musicians

- Izaak Mills – tenor saxophone (tracks 11 and 12), flute (tracks 2, 6, 7)
- Hannah Blilie – vocals (track 5)

Artwork

- Ryan Iverson – cover painting, Tapestry of Webs, and all artwork
- Strath Shepard/Pacific Standard – layout
