= New War =

New War is an Australian rock band based in Melbourne. They play dub-tinged punk.

== Line-up ==
- Bass: Melissa Lock
- Drums: Steve Masterton
- Keyboard: Jesse Shepherd
- Vocals: Chris Pugmire

== History ==
Pugmire and Lock, both formerly of the Seattle punk band Shoplifting, formed New War over four years. Their first release was the single "Ghostwalking" in 2011 on Fast Weapons.

=== Albums ===
They released their self-titled debut album in 2013 with ATP Recordings.

Their second album, Coin, was released in 2018 by It Records.

Trouble In The Air, their third album, was commissioned by the City of Melbourne and recorded live at Melbourne Town Hall in 2017, with keyboardist Jesse Shepherd playing the town hall organ. It was released on February 28, 2020, by Heavy Machinery Records and was album of the week in The Age.
