= The Correlation Between Entrance and Exit Wounds =

Studio album by SeeYouSpaceCowboy
- Released: September 27, 2019
- Genre: Sasscore; hardcore punk; mathcore; metalcore
- Length: 28:37
- Label: Pure Noise
- Producer: Taylor Jewell; Connie Sgarbossa; Jesse Price

SeeYouSpaceCowboy chronology
Songs for the Firing Squad (2019)	The Correlation Between Entrance and Exit Wounds (2019)	A Sure Disaster (2021)

Singles from The Correlation Between Entrance and Exit Wounds
- 1. "Armed with Their Teeth" Released: July 30, 2019; 2. "Put On a Show, Don't Let Them See You Fail" Released: August 27, 2019

Professional ratings
Review scores
Source	Rating
Everything Is Noise	Recommended
The Music	4.5/5 stars
The Soundboard	8/10

The Correlation Between Entrance and Exit Wounds is the debut studio album by American hardcore punk band SeeYouSpaceCowboy. The album was released on September 27, 2019, through Pure Noise Records. The record was produced by Taylor Jewell and band members Connie Sgarbossa and Jesse Price.

The album received positive reviews, with Loudwire naming it one of the 50 best metal albums of 2019.

== Background ==
SeeYouSpaceCowboy was formed in 2016 by siblings Connie and Ethan Sgarbossa. The band released a series of independent EPs and the stand-alone single "Atrocities from a Story Book Perspective" from 2016 to 2018. In January 2019, the band announced that they had signed to Pure Noise Records and announced the compilation album Songs for the Firing Squad, consisting of re-recorded versions of songs from the band's independent releases along with the new song "Self Help Specialist Ends Own Life".

On July 30, SeeYouSpaceCowboy released the song "Armed with Their Teeth" and announced the title of their debut album, The Correlation Between Entrance and Exit Wounds. On August 27, the band released another single, "Put On a Show, Don't Let Them See You Fail".

== Track listing ==
All tracks are written by SeeYouSpaceCowboy.

No.	Title	Length
1.	"The Motion of Impending Harm"	1:32
2.	"Armed with Their Teeth"	1:53
3.	"With High Hopes and Clipped Wings"	2:27
4.	"Disdain Coupled with a Wide Smile"	1:46
5.	"A Space Marked 'Escaped'" (Instrumental)	1:57
6.	"Prolonging the Inevitable Forever"	2:38
7.	"Late December"	4:05
8.	"Have You Lost the Plot?" (Instrumental)	1:19
9.	"Put On a Show, Don't Let Them See You Fall"	2:12
10.	"No Words, No Compensating Lies"	4:31
11.	"Dissertation of an Idle Voice"	2:46
12.	"The Phoenix Must Reset"	2:56

== Personnel ==
SeeYouSpaceCowboy

- Connie Sgarbossa – lead vocals, recording
- Jesse Price – guitar, backing vocals, recording
- Ethan Sgarbossa – guitar
- Cameron Phipps – bass
- Bryan Prosser – drums

Additional

- Taylor Jewell – recording
