= Songs for the Firing Squad =

Compilation album by SeeYouSpaceCowboy
- Released: January 25, 2019
- Studio: Sunsick Studio, San Diego, California
- Genre: Sasscore; hardcore punk; mathcore; metalcore
- Length: 18:20
- Label: Pure Noise
- Producer: Alexander Jacobelli

SeeYouSpaceCowboy chronology
SYSC//SGKF Split (2018)	Songs for the Firing Squad (2019)	The Correlation Between Entrance and Exit Wounds (2019)

Professional ratings
Review scores
Source	Rating
Kill Your Stereo	4/5 stars

Songs for the Firing Squad is a compilation album by American hardcore punk band SeeYouSpaceCowboy. The album was released digitally on January 25, 2019, through Pure Noise Records. Songs for the Firing Squad is composed of remastered songs from the band's earlier releases along with two new tracks.

== Background ==
SeeYouSpaceCowboy was formed in 2016 with Connie Sgarbossa on vocals, Taylor Allen on guitar, Jessie Price on bass and backing vocals, and Connie's younger brother Ethan on drums. On January 25, 2019, the band announced that they had been signed to Pure Noise Records; that same day, the band digitally released Songs for the Firing Squad and a music video for the song "Self Help Specialist Ends Own Life". The album would receive a physical release a month and a half later on March 8.

== Track listing ==
No.	Title	Length
1.	"911 Call: 'Help I've Overdosed on Philosophy!'"	1:25
2.	"Self Help Specialist Ends Own Life"	1:55
3.	"I Am a Trans-Continental Railroad, Please Run a Train on Me"	1:11
4.	"Stop Calling Us Screamo"	1:17
5.	"You Don't Understand the Liquor Is Calling the Shots Randy BoBandy"	1:05
6.	"You Can't Get Goose Justice in Fox Court, Just Spit on the Judge"	1:32
7.	"Atrocities from a Storybook Perspective"	1:26
8.	"An Introduction for People Who Hate Introductions"	1:02
9.	"Jimmy Buffett Doesn't Even Surf"	1:09
10.	"Soap Opera Stardom Is a Single Tear Drop Away"	1:22
11.	"Pep Talk from a Nihilist"	1:28
12.	"Fashion Statements of the Socially Aware"	1:40
13.	"Absolutely Absolute Absolution"	1:42

Notes

- Tracks 1 and 2 are new songs exclusive to this release
- Tracks 3 to 6 are from the SYSC//SGKF Split (2018)
- Track 7 is from the "Atrocities from a Storybook Perspective" 7" single (2017)
- Tracks 8 to 13 are from the Fashion Statements of the Socially Aware EP (2017)

== Personnel ==
SeeYouSpaceCowboy

- Connie Sgarbossa – lead vocals
- Jesse Price – guitar, backing vocals
- Dominick Larocca – guitar (tracks 1–7)
- Timmy Moreno – bass
- Ethan Sgarbossa – drums

Additional

- Alexander Jacobelli – producer, mixing, mastering
- Brad Boatright – remastering
- Flesh & Bone Design – artwork, layout
