= The Romance of Affliction =

Studio album by SeeYouSpaceCowboy
- Released: November 5, 2021
- Genre: Sasscore; metalcore; post-hardcore; emo
- Length: 39:58
- Label: Pure Noise
- Producer: Isaac Hale; Matt Guglielmo

SeeYouSpaceCowboy chronology
A Sure Disaster (2021)	The Romance of Affliction (2021)	Coup de Grâce (2024)

Singles from The Romance of Affliction
- 1. "Misinterpreting Constellations" Released: September 22, 2021; 2. "Intersecting Storylines to the Same Tragedy" Released: October 6, 2021; 3. "The End to a Brief Moment of Lasting Intimacy" Released: October 20, 2021

Professional ratings
Review scores
Source	Rating
Distorted Sound	8/10
Kerrang!	4/5
Pitchfork	7.6/10
Wall of Sound	8/10

The Romance of Affliction is the second studio album by American hardcore punk band SeeYouSpaceCowboy. It was released on November 5, 2021, through Pure Noise Records. The album was produced by Knocked Loose guitarist Isaac Hale with additional production done by Matt Guglielmo.

== Musical style ==
The album's musical style has been described as sasscore, metalcore, post-hardcore and emo. Additionally, the album also contains influences from mathcore and deathcore.

== Background ==
On September 22, 2021, the band announced that they would be releasing a new album later that year called The Romance of Affliction. On the same day, the band released the album's first single, "Misinterpreting Constellations." On October 6, the band released the single "Intersecting Storylines to the Same Tragedy," featuring vocals from Underoath drummer and vocalist Aaron Gillespie. The album's third and final single, "The End to a Brief Moment of Lasting Intimacy," was released on October 20.

== Track listing ==
All tracks are written by SeeYouSpaceCowboy.

No.	Title	Length
1.	"Life As a Soap Opera Plot, 26 Years Running" (featuring Keith Buckley)	3:23
2.	"Misinterpreting Constellations"	3:51
3.	"The End to a Brief Moment of Lasting Intimacy"	3:35
4.	"Sharpen What You Can" (featuring Shaolin G)	2:06
5.	"With Arms That Bind and Lips That Lock"	3:51
6.	"Losing Sight of the Exit..." (Instrumental)	1:02
7.	"...And My Faded Reflection In Your Eyes"	3:08
8.	"Intersecting Storylines to the Same Tragedy" (featuring Aaron Gillespie)	3:08
9.	"Ouroboros As an Overused Metaphor"	3:38
10.	"Anything to Take Me Anywhere But Here"	1:53
11.	"The Peace In Disillusion" (Instrumental)	1:34
12.	"Melodrama Between Two Entirely Bored Individuals"	3:39
13.	"The Romance of Affliction" (featuring If I Die First)	5:04

== Personnel ==
SeeYouSpaceCowboy

- Connie Sgarbossa – vocals
- Ethan Sgarbossa – guitar, clean vocals
- Taylor Allen – bass, clean vocals
- AJ Tartol – drums

Additional

- Keith Buckley – additional vocals (track 1)
- Shaolin G – additional vocals (track 4)
- Aaron Gillespie – additional vocals (track 8)
- If I Die First – additional vocals (track 13)
- Isaac Hale – producer
- Matt Guglielmo – engineer, additional production
- Will Putney – mixing, mastering
- Flesh and Bone Designs – layout, artwork
