= Effluxion (album) =

Studio album by Telekinesis
- Released: February 22, 2019
- Length: 31:02
- Label: Merge
- Producer: Michael Benjamin Lerner

Telekinesis chronology
Ad Infinitum (2015)	Effluxion (2019)

Singles from Effluxion
- 1. "Set a Course" Released: November 28, 2018

Professional ratings
Aggregate scores
Source	Rating
Metacritic	68/100
Review scores
Source	Rating
AllMusic	3.5/5 stars
The Line of Best Fit	4/10
Under the Radar	6.5/10

Effluxion is the fifth studio album by American band Telekinesis. It was released on February 22, 2019 through Merge Records.

== Track listing ==
No.	Title	Length
1.	"Effluxion"	3:32
2.	"Cut the Quick"	4:22
3.	"Like Nothing"	2:53
4.	"Running Like a River"	1:49
5.	"Set a Course"	3:38
6.	"How Do I Get Rid of Sunlight?"	2:32
7.	"Suburban Streetlight Drunk"	3:15
8.	"Feel It in Your Bones"	2:57
9.	"A Place in the Sun"	2:19
10.	"Out for Blood"	3:44
