= Coup de Grâce (SeeYouSpaceCowboy album) =

Studio album by SeeYouSpaceCowboy
- Released: April 19, 2024
- Recorded: 2023–2024
- Genres: Pop screamo; metalcore; post-hardcore
- Length: 39:08
- Label: Pure Noise
- Producer: Matt Squire

SeeYouSpaceCowboy chronology
The Romance of Affliction (2021)	Coup de Grâce (2024)

Singles from Coup de Grâce
- 1. "Chewing the Scenery" Released: August 24, 2023; 2. "Rhythm and Rapture" Released: September 5, 2023; 3. "Respite for a Tragic Tale" / "Silhouettes in Motion" Released: March 5, 2024; 4. "To the Dance Floor for Shelter" Released: March 29, 2024; 5. "Red Wine and Discontent" Released: April 8, 2024

Professional ratings
Review scores
Source	Rating
Distorted Sound	9/10
Kerrang!	4/5
Metal Hammer	4.5/5 stars
New Noise	4.5/5 stars

Coup de Grâce is the third and final studio album by American metalcore band SeeYouSpaceCowboy. It was released on April 19, 2024, through Pure Noise Records. It is the band's final studio album with vocalist Connie Sgarbossa, who departed and disbanded the group in January 2025. A deluxe version of the album was released on January 29, 2026, featuring two b-sides “A Task for Sharp Teeth and Ruby Lips” and “Beautiful Frames for Ugly People”.

== Background ==
SeeYouSpaceCowboy released the single "Chewing the Scenery" on August 24, 2023, but did not announce a new album at the time. The band would release a second single, "Rhythm and Rapture", featuring vocals from Nothing,Nowhere, two weeks later on September 5. The band released the double a-side single "Respite for a Tragic Tale" / "Silhouettes in Motion" on March 5, 2024, announcing a new album, titled Coup de Grâce, along with the album's track listing. Later that month, on March 29, the single "To the Dance Floor for Shelter" was released, featuring vocals from Courtney LaPlante of Spiritbox. The album's fifth and final single, "Red Wine and Discontent", was released on April 8.

== Track listing ==
No.	Title	Length
1.	"Allow Us to Set the Scene" (featuring iRis.EXE)	2:26
2.	"Subtle Whispers to Take Your Breath Away"	3:06
3.	"And the Two Slipped Into the Shadows"	3:25
4.	"Red Wine and Discontent"	3:33
5.	"Lubricant Like Kerosene" (featuring Kim Dracula)	3:17
6.	"Respite for a Tragic Tale" (featuring iRis.EXE)	1:56
7.	"Silhouettes in Motion"	2:47
8.	"To the Dance Floor for Shelter" (featuring Courtney LaPlante)	4:19
9.	"Rhythm and Rapture" (featuring Nothing,Nowhere)	3:01
10.	"Sister with a Gun"	3:01
11.	"Chewing the Scenery"	3:48
12.	"Curtain Call"	4:24

== Personnel ==
SeeYouSpaceCowboy

- Connie Sgarbossa – lead vocals
- Ethan Sgarbossa – guitar, vocals
- Timmy Moreno – guitar
- Taylor Allen – bass, clean vocals
- AJ Tartol – drums, backing vocals
