= Waxwing (band) =

American indie rock band

- Left to Right: Rocky Votolato, Andrew Hartley, Cody Votolato, Rudy Gajadhar

Background information
- Origin: Seattle, Washington, United States
- Genres: Emo, indie rock
- Years active: 1996–2005
- Labels: Henry's Finest; Second Nature
- Past members: Rocky Votolato; Rudy Gajadhar; Andrew Hartley; Cody Votolato

Waxwing was an indie rock band from Seattle, Washington. Formed in 1996 as a trio, with singer Rocky Votolato (19), bassist Andrew Hartley, and drummer Rudy Gajadhar (both 16) they played their first show at the legendary Velvet Elvis in 1996, shortly before Rocky's brother, Cody Votolato, joined the band at just 15. Their first album, For Madmen Only, was released on Second Nature Recordings in 1999.

The band officially broke up in late 2005, stating simply "we are finally calling it quits." Later, Cody Votolato cited the growing popularity of his band The Blood Brothers, as well as Rocky's increasing focus on his solo material, as factors in the band's breakup.

In an interview with Seattle's The Stranger in April 2013, Rocky Votolato announced that the band were working on new music, saying, "We have been writing since early this year and can't wait to record another record. Not sure when that will happen but we're definitely planning on it." Rocky also said the band had "hopefully many more [live shows] to come." They played several reunion shows in the summer of 2013, including a live set on Seattle's KEXP on August 17, the Black Lodge on August 23, and the Vera Project on August 24.

Although (as of 2026) no new Waxwing music has been released and the band has not played any more live shows, Rocky Votolato and Rudy Gajadhar announced in 2024 that they had formed a new band, Suzzallo. They released an album, The Quiet Year, in 2025.

== Discography ==
=== Studio albums ===
- Waxwing 7" (Henry's Finest Recordings, 1998)
- For Madmen Only (Second Nature Recordings, 1999)
- One for the Ride (Second Nature Recordings, 2000)
- Intervention: Collection+Remix (Second Nature Recordings, 2001)
- Nobody Can Take What Everybody Owns (Second Nature Recordings, 2002)

=== Compilation appearances ===
- Living Silent (Status Recordings, 1998) - Track "Charmageddon"
- Split 7" with The Casket Lottery (Second Nature Recordings, 2000) - Track "Laboratory"
- This Changes Everything (Second Nature Recordings, 2001) - Track "Laboratory"
- Copper Press Presents ... Volume 13 - Track "Color"
