= Shoplifting (band) =

American punk band

Shoplifting was an American punk band, formed in 2002 in Seattle, Washington.

Shoplifting was composed of members Hannah Blilie (drums/vocals), Chris Pugmire (vocals/guitar), Devin Welch (guitar), and Melissa Lock (bass), who replaced Michelle Nolan (bass).

== History ==
Shoplifting entered the Seattle musical landscape in early 2003, quickly impacting a music community that (with a few exceptions) had grown stale and apolitical in the wake of the city’s gentrification, and the decreased visibility of Riot Grrrl and other similarly radical movements.

In that year, Shoplifting displayed a thirst for play and experimentation, playing shows in every imaginable sort of space (from elevator shafts to basements to the lawn of the state capitol), blindfolding audiences or giving them instruments, microphones and space to share, improvising performances, and collaborating in different mediums with a diverse array of artists and friends. They also toured with Erase Errata and King Cobra, self-released a cassette, actively organized against sexual violence in their community, and helped launch the Seattle chapter of Bands Against Bush, a national struggle of artists against the domestic and international terrorism and imperialism of the U.S. government.

In early 2004, Shoplifting recorded with Justin Trosper (Unwound) in Olympia and that summer released a 7" and an eponymous EP with Kill Rock Stars. They toured the U.S. in the summer of 2004, culminating in a protest show in Brooklyn on the eve of the Republican National Convention. After the tour, Michelle left the band and relocated to the East Coast.

Chris, Hannah, and Devin spent nine months regrouping and in the summer of 2005 emerged with a new member, bassist Melissa Lock, a friend hailing from Melbourne, Australia. The new lineup quickly bonded and toured the West Coast with Spider and the Webs. They then began recording their debut album, Body Stories, with producer Steve Fisk.

Body Stories was released by Kill Rock Stars in March 2006. The band toured the U.S., including an East Coast stint with Mecca Normal and has been silent since.

Hannah Blilie continued to play drums with The Gossip until 2019. Devin Welch continues to play guitar in Seattle with the bands Flexions and Past Lives. Chris and Melissa now reside in Australia and play in New War.

== Discography ==
Albums

- Body Stories (Kill Rock Stars)

EPs

- Shoplifting (Kill Rock Stars)
- "Hegemony Enemy b/w Talk of the Town" (Kill Rock Stars)

Compilations

- Otis' Opuses (Kill Rock Stars)
- Tracks and Fields (Kill Rock Stars)
- Zum Audio Vol. 3 (Kill Rock Stars)

Other Discography

- Practice/Live' Cassette (Self-Released)
