= The VSS =

American rock band

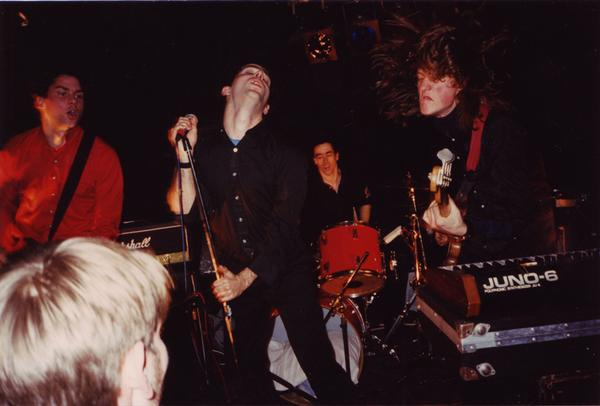
- The VSS live in London, England, 1997

Background information
- Origin: Boulder, Colorado, U.S.
- Genres: Post-hardcore, sass, experimental rock
- Years active: 1995–1997
- Labels: Gold Standard Laboratories; Hydra Head Records; Gravity Records; Honey Bear Records
- Past members: Sonny Kay; Josh Hughes; Andrew Douglas-Rothbard; Dave Clifford

The VSS was an American rock band from Boulder, Colorado, United States.

== History ==
The VSS formed in 1995 after the breakup of the hardcore group Angel Hair. Vocalist Sonny Kay and guitarist Josh Hughes had both played in Angel Hair; the rest of the lineup consisted of bassist Andrew Douglas Rothbard and Dave Clifford. They quickly released several 7" records and toured the United States, achieving nationwide notice among the underground punk scene with acclaim from publications such as Maximum Rocknroll and Flipside. Midway through their career, the band relocated to San Francisco. Their only album, Nervous Circuits, was released on Honey Bear Records in 1997, and the group broke up shortly thereafter.

Sonny Kay went on to sing with Year Future and founded the label Gold Standard Laboratories, which re-released their Gravity 7" records as a CD entitled 21:51 in 2000. Dave Clifford, Josh Hughes, and Andrew Douglas Rothbard formed a new group called Slaves, which changed its name to Pleasure Forever, and released two full-length LP's on Sub Pop records. Dave Clifford later played with Red Sparowes. Josh Hughes went on to form the band Rabbits, and Andrew Douglas Rothbard has released several solo albums.

Their use of synthesizers and keyboards in a hardcore punk setting was uncommon for its time, but has been recognized as an influence on bands such as The Faint and Death From Above 1979. In 2008, Hydra Head Records re-released Nervous Circuits on CD with a bonus DVD, as well as an additional bonus CD with the first 1,000 copies.

== Members ==
- Sonny Kay - vocals
- Josh Hughes - guitar
- Andrew Douglas Rothbard - bass and synthesizer
- Dave Clifford - drums

== Discography ==
- The VSS 7" (Strict Records No. 4, 1995)
- The VSS/T-Tauri Split 7" (Titanic Records No. 8, 1995)
- The VSS 7" (Gravity Records No. 25, 1996)
- 21:51 CD (Gold Standard Laboratories, No. 7 1996)
- The VSS/Rye Coalition Split double 7" (Super 8 records No. 13, 1997)
- Nervous Circuits LP and CD (Honey Bear Records, No. 16,1997)
- 21:51 CD (Gold Standard Laboratories, No. 7 re-released with different artwork, 2000)
- Nervous Circuits CD/DVD reissue (Hydra Head Records, No. 158, 2008)
- Nervous Circuits 2LP reissue (Sargent House, No. 081, 2013)
