= Irregular Choice =

British shoe manufacturer

Irregular Choice is a fashion brand founded in Brighton in 1999. It specialises in unusual footwear, bags and accessories.

== History ==
Irregular Choice was founded in 1999 by the designer Dan Sullivan. He told Women's Wear Daily that his brightly coloured, unusual designs were created in response to "boring" and "very black and brown" British High Street fashions in the late 1990s, and that the printed and coloured footwear sold far better than the classic designs. Sullivan's mother had originally designed for the fashion label Red or Dead, and his father had founded a shoe brand called Pod, which led Sullivan down the path of wanting to "do something mad and adventurous, something based on an irregular concept."

Irregular Choice has collaborated with multiple brands and designers. A small collection of shoes created for Heatherette's 2007 collection reportedly led to demand from the likes of Mena Suvari, Theodora Richards and Lydia Hearst; and was followed up by a spin-off range called Heatherette Loves Irregular Choice in response to fan demand. For two years they produced a line in collaboration with the cult fashion doll Blythe, featuring the doll's image.

Irregular Choice temporarily shut down in 2025 due to rising costs and factory closing. However, after much customer support, they were able to reopen with a new business model on February 25, 2026

== Products ==
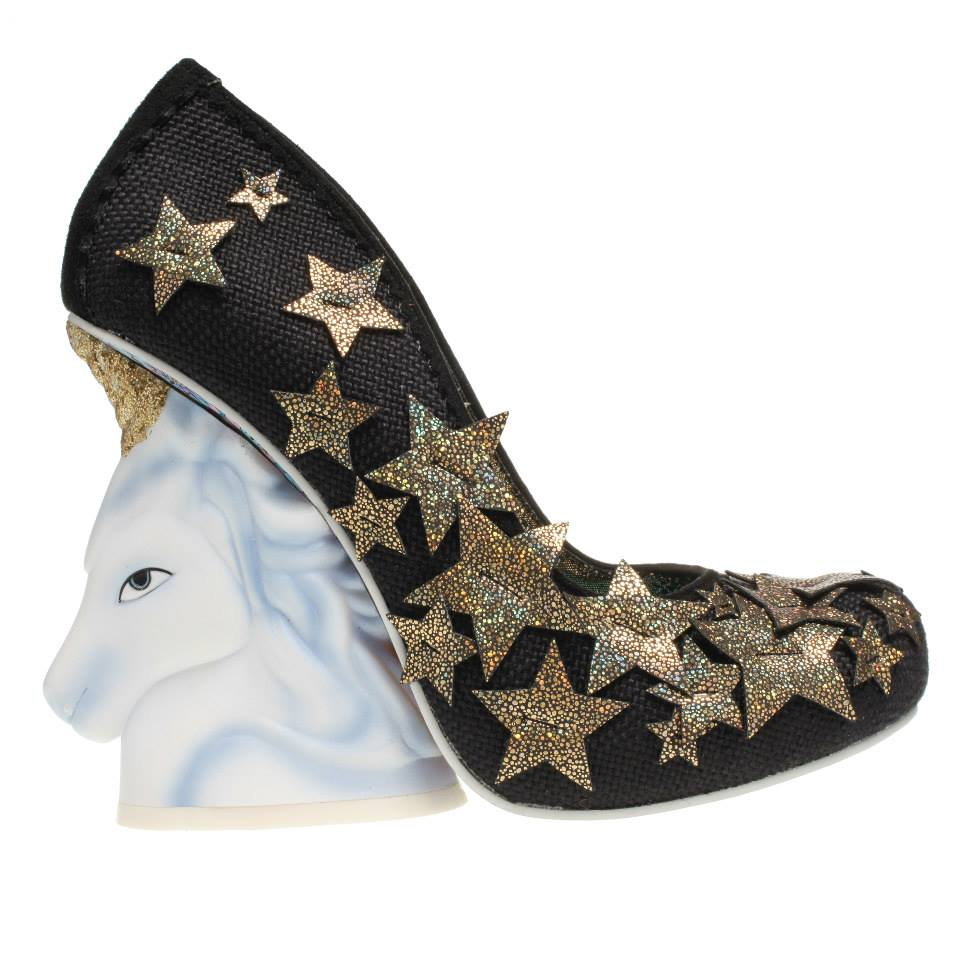
Irregular Choice shoe with unicorn heel, 2014

Among Irregular Choice's early designs were shoes and boots based upon the traditional Japanese split-toe look. In Summer 2004, the brand introduced handbags; followed up with gloves, umbrellas and other accessories for that year's Fall collections. In February 2008 they launched a womenswear line using prints that Sullivan's team designed themselves. One Irregular Choice trademark is the "character heel," including rabbit-shaped ones (called 'Thumper'), garden gnome and unicorn designs.

== Stores ==
In 2003 Irregular Choice debuted their shoes onto the American market, and within a year were being stocked by 240 stores across the United States. In 2007 Irregular Choice opened its first shop in SoHo, Manhattan, with weekly sales from $25,000 to $35,000. By 2012 they were selling products in more than 50 countries, with new shops opening in Hong Kong and Paris and aiming to open a new shop in Dublin. In 2008, their flagship store launched on Carnaby Street in London, and alongside the Brighton shop (opened in 2010), two additional Irregular Choice shops were opened in Leicester and Norwich in 2012.

== Links ==
- Official website: http://www.irregularchoice.com/
