= A Sure Disaster =

EP by SeeYouSpaceCowboy and If I Die First
- Released: May 14, 2021
- Genres: Metalcore; post-hardcore; emo
- Length: 15:42
- Labels: Pure Noise; Velocity

SeeYouSpaceCowboy chronology
The Correlation Between Entrance and Exit Wounds (2019)	A Sure Disaster (2021)	The Romance of Affliction (2021)

If I Die First chronology
My Poison Arms (2020)	A Sure Disaster (2021)	They Drew Blood (2021)

Singles from A Sure Disaster
- 1. "Bloodstainedeyes" Released: March 30, 2021; 2. "My Nightmares Would Do Numbers as Horror Movies" Released: April 14, 2021; 3. "Painting a Clear Picture from a Unreliable Narrator" Released: April 28, 2021

Professional ratings
Review scores
Source	Rating
Distorted Sound	8/10
Kerrang!	3/5

A Sure Disaster is a split EP by American post-hardcore bands SeeYouSpaceCowboy and If I Die First. It was released on May 14, 2021, through Pure Noise Records and Velocity Records.

== Background ==
On March 30, 2021, SeeYouSpaceCowboy and If I Die First released the joint single "Bloodstainedeyes" and announced they would be releasing a split EP titled A Sure Disaster. SeeYouSpaceCowboy would release a second single from the EP, "Painting a Clear Picture from a Unreliable Narrator", on April 28.

== Track listing ==
No.	Title	Artist	Length
1.	"Painting a Clear Picture from a Unreliable Narrator"	SeeYouSpaceCowboy	3:20
2.	"Modernizing the Myth of Sisyphus"	SeeYouSpaceCowboy	1:47
3.	"Bloodstainedeyes"	SeeYouSpaceCowboy, If I Die First	5:00
4.	"Mirror, Mirror This Is Nothing Like You Promised"	If I Die First	2:21
5.	"My Nightmares Would Do Numbers as Horror Movies"	If I Die First	3:14

== Personnel ==
SeeYouSpaceCowboy

- Connie Sgarbossa – lead vocals, artwork
- Ethan Sgarbossa – guitar, vocals
- Taylor Allen – bass, clean vocals
- Sal Argento – drums

If I Die First

- John Villagrán – lead vocals
- Travis Richter – guitar, unclean vocals
- Morgan Braden – guitar, vocals
- Kevin O'Neill – bass, keyboards, clean vocals
- Derek Bloom – drums

Additional personnel

- Cameron Nunez – photography
