= Past Lives (band) =

American rock band

- Origin: Seattle, Washington, U.S.
- Genres: Post-punk; Experimental rock Post-hardcore
- Years active: 2007–present
- Label: Suicide Squeeze Records
- Spinoff of: The Blood Brothers
- Members: Jordan Blilie; Mark Gajadhar; Morgan Henderson; Devin Welch
- Website: pastliveslife.com

Past Lives is an American rock band from Seattle, Washington. The band formed out of the breakup of The Blood Brothers in late 2007.

== History ==
The band got their start in late 2007 after the breakup of The Blood Brothers. Vocalist Jordan Blilie, bassist Morgan Henderson, and drummer Mark Gajadhar joined with former Blood Brothers guitarist Devin Welch and started working on their debut EP almost immediately. Strange Symmetry was released in August 2008 through Suicide Squeeze. It was initially a digital-only release with a limited run of physical CDs, but was later made more widely available on CD and vinyl.

Around the same time, the band was also featured in The Journal of Popular Noise, releasing a limited vinyl EP alongside other artists. The EP can also be downloaded from the band's official website.

A Myspace blog posted on November 17, 2009, detailed the forthcoming album, Tapestry of Webs. It was released in February 2010 by Suicide Squeeze. The post includes a full track listing and says that the title is taken from a painting by Ryan Iverson who agreed to let the band use the image for the album cover.

== Members ==
- Jordan Blilie – vocals
- Mark Gajadhar – drums
- Morgan Henderson – baritone guitar, keyboards
- Devin Welch – guitar

== Discography ==
- Strange Symmetry EP (2008)
- The Journal of Popular Noise – Volume 1, Issue 7 (2008)
- Tapestry of Webs (2010)
