= The Blood Brothers (band) =

American post-hardcore band

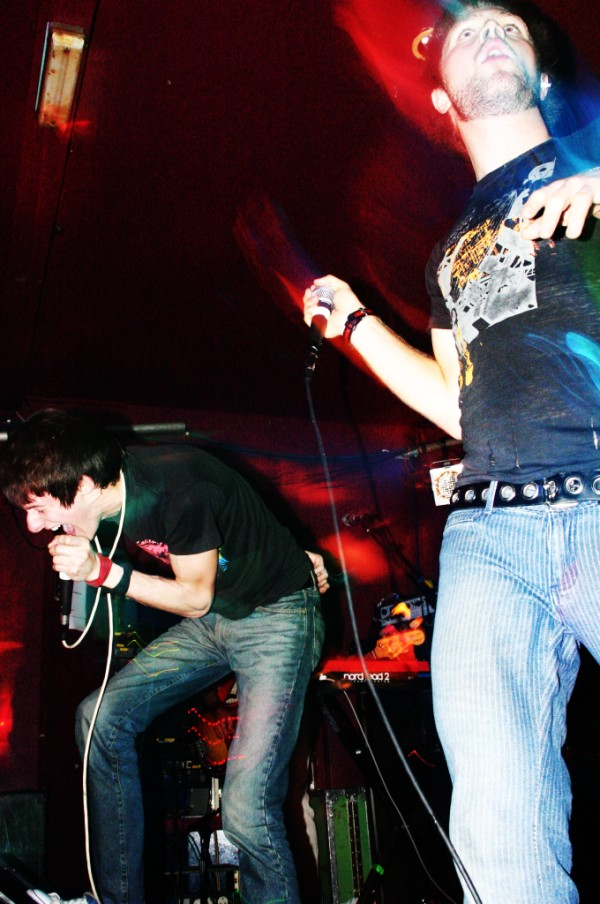
- The Blood Brothers performing live, c. 2003

Background information
- Origin: Redmond, Washington, U.S.
- Genres: Post-hardcore; sass; art punk
- Years active: 1997–2007, 2014, 2024–present
- Labels: Wichita Recordings, V2, ARTISTdirect, Three One G, Luckyhorse Industries, Epitaph
- Spinoffs: Evil Island
- Members: Jordan Blilie; Mark Gajadhar; Morgan Henderson; Johnny Whitney; Cody Votolato
- Past members: Devin Welch

The Blood Brothers are an American post-hardcore band which formed in Seattle's Eastside suburbs in 1997. The group released five full-length albums before their 2007 break-up, but reunited for a series of shows surrounding and including FYF Fest in 2014. They reunited once again in 2024 to celebrate the 20th anniversary of their album Crimes. An offshoot band called Evil Island was formed in 2025, with singer Johnny Whitney, drummer Mark Gajadhar and guitarist Cody Votolato.

== History ==
=== Origin ===
Singers Jordan Blilie and Johnny Whitney and drummer Mark Gajadhar formed the band from a previous musical endeavor, a band called Vade that they were involved with when they were 15 years old. Joining with bassist Morgan Henderson and guitarist Devin Welch the following year, the Blood Brothers were born in August 1997. The band recorded their first 7-inch record for $200 in a basement the following year. After replacing Welch with guitarist Cody Votolato, the lineup was complete. The band left on their first tour immediately after Votolato graduated from high school. In July 2002, the band toured the United States with Vermont-based math rock band The Cancer Conspiracy and Florida-based indie rock band The Rocking Horse Winner. The band's third album, ...Burn, Piano Island, Burn, was released in 2003 and produced by Ross Robinson.

The Blood Brothers' fifth and final album, Young Machetes, was released on October 10, 2006, with Fugazi member Guy Picciotto co-producing it.

=== Hiatus and breakup ===
Music website Punknews.org reported that the band was going on hiatus, though they had initially reported the situation as a breakup. The news story linked to a forum post by Three One G owner Justin Pearson, who was replying to a post about the breakup of Some Girls. He only stated "the blood bros broke up."

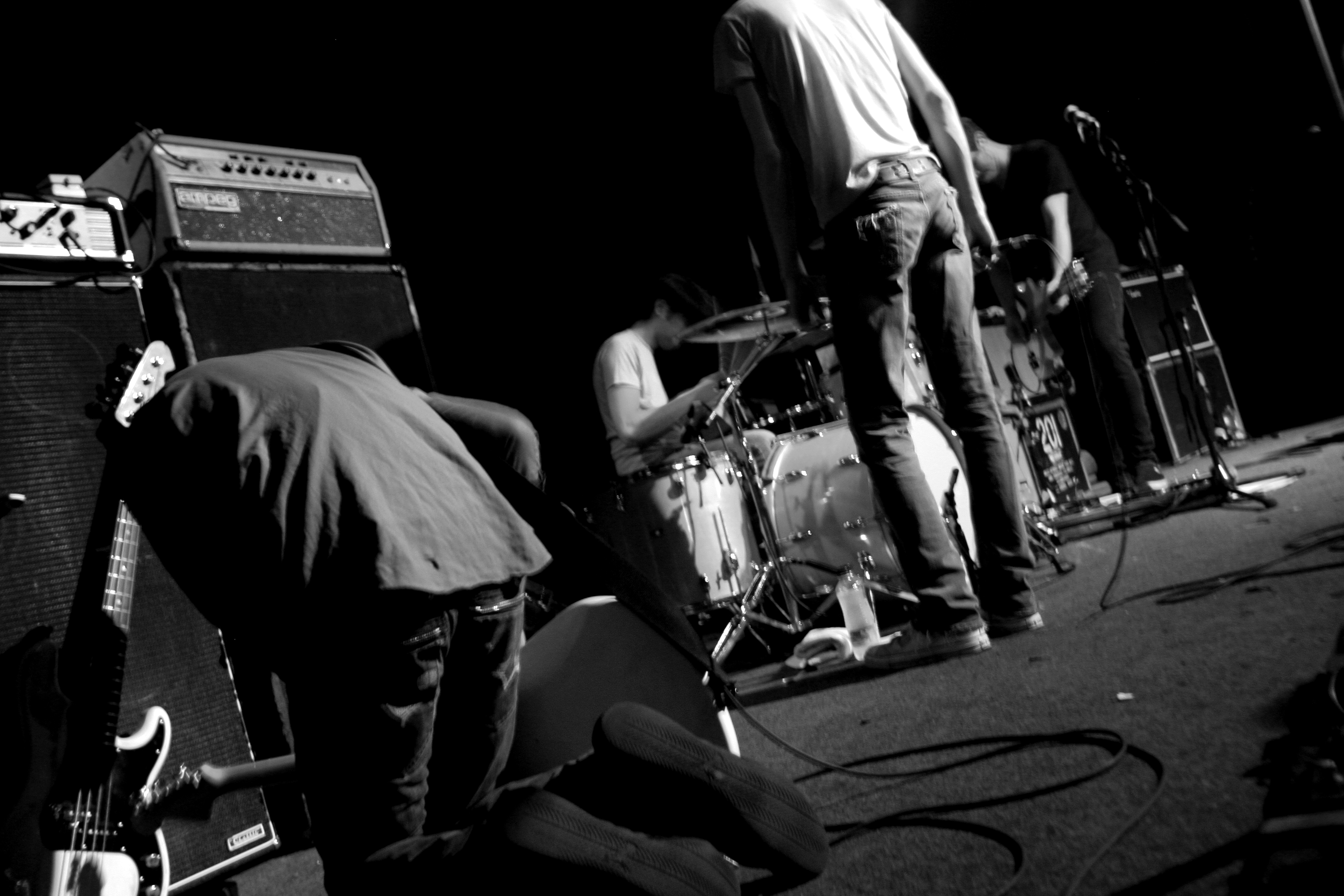
The Blood Brothers performing in Germany in 2007

The band officially broke up in June 2007, but kept the information from the public until November 2007. Rumors of the disbandment can be traced as far back as July.

The Blood Brothers were expected to make an announcement about their future in early 2008, but instead officially announced the breakup on November 8, 2007:

Dear Friends,

After 10 years of making music as The Blood Brothers, we have made the collective decision that our time together has come to an end. We feel extremely fortunate to have spent such a deeply memorable and amazing part of our lives with each other. At this point, however, we feel it's best that our futures move forward on separate paths. We'd like to express our sincerest thanks and gratitude to all the bands we've played with, individuals who have helped us make our records, and fans who have come to our shows and picked up our music throughout the years. Your friendship, support and love hold such a profoundly special place in each of our hearts. We hope that the memories you attach to our music are as fond as those you have given us. Thank you and take care, we'll miss all of you.

Love,

The Blood Brothers

In a December 2008 interview with Seattle newspaper The Stranger, Blilie gave the following reason for the band's breakup:

I can't point to one defining event.... It was harder and harder for us to find that middle ground where all of us were happy. People weren't getting what they desired from music and being in a band. I couldn't imagine trying to work on another record with that band. We drifted apart, as people do, as people grow into different individuals and have different ideas of where they want to be in their lives and what they want to be doing with music. As different as we were, we all shared a similar vision as far as where we wanted to be; as the years progressed, it became more and more polarized. If something is no longer bringing you joy, it's time to make a change.

It was announced on October 19, 2009, that Epitaph Records would be re-issuing the band's last four full-length albums with added b-sides, live tracks and remixes.

=== Reunions ===
On May 16, 2014, The Blood Brothers announced a reunion to play FYF Fest on August 24. Their first show in seven years took place on August 22, 2014, at the Showbox in Seattle. The band added further dates in New York City, Austin and Santa Ana. Jordan Blilie said that the band would not be releasing new music.

On May 15, 2024, The Blood Brothers announced another reunion and United States tour alongside a 20th anniversary reissue of Crimes. Blilie said, "It was on stage, though, where that energy reached its most joyful, reckless, collective state. It's an experience that never really goes away, and one we wanted to share again. So, we'll be playing a handful of shows this fall." The band's first show in a decade took place on October 13, 2024, in Las Vegas, as a last-minute replacement for Bright Eyes to headline the Best Friends Forever festival.

== Musical style ==
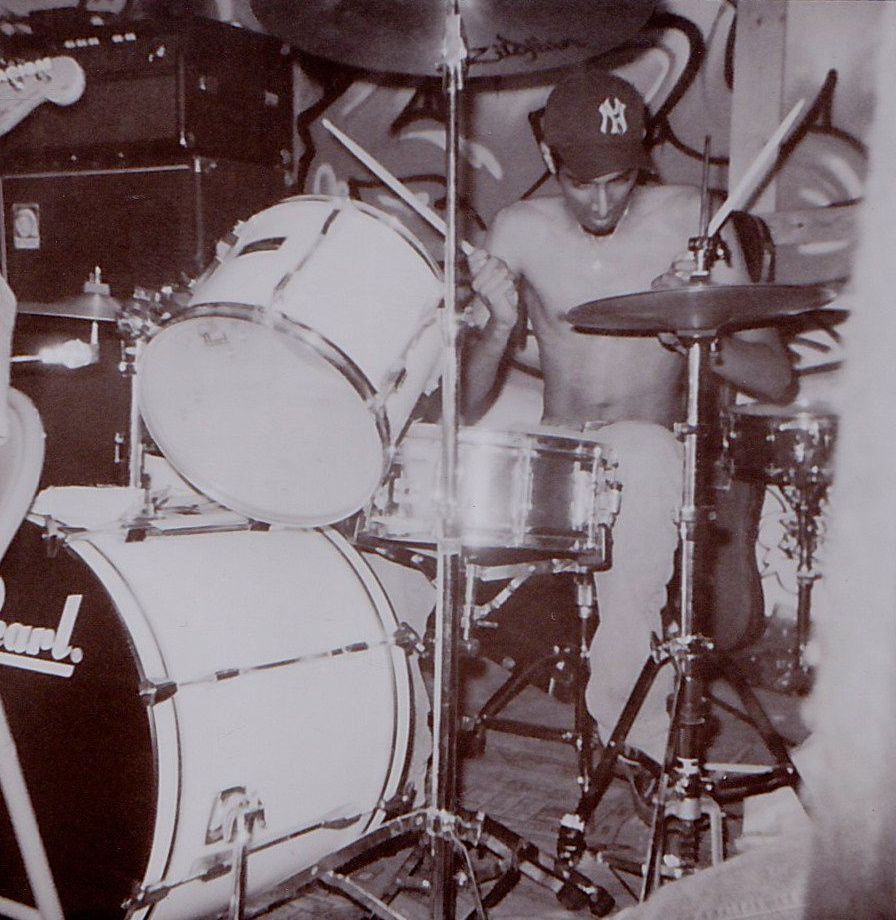
The Blood Brothers in Bloomington, Indiana in 2000

The Blood Brothers is commonly seen as a post-hardcore band and incorporate elements from a number of genres including experimental, screamo, emo, hardcore punk, noise, post-punk, and dance. The band has cited Drive Like Jehu, Botch, Swing Kids, Rye Coalition, and Gang of Four, among others, as influences. Cody Votolato's angular guitarwork, in addition to drawing from Drive Like Jehu, Swing Kids, and Rye Coalition, was also influenced by Antioch Arrow.

According to Jordan Blilie, many of the band's lyrics deal with "comodification as a whole and exploitation of sexuality. Turning something that has some kind of meaning to it and distorting it into some sort of dollar sign, a product. Just the idea of selling yourself, the idea of doing anything that gets you ahead in this sort of capitalism we live in right now. The idea of severing relationships and things that are worthwhile for personal gain."

The band is particularly notable for having the unique dueling vocals of Johnny Whitney and Jordan Blilie. The style of guitar playing showcased by Votolato has greatly changed over time, most notably between the heavy, discordant sound of ...Burn, Piano Island, Burn and the minimalist lead lines of Crimes, where the energy of the drums and vocals tends to make up for the lack of thick distortion. Whitney's voice is generally accepted to have evolved from the slurred, venomous drawl on This Adultery Is Ripe to the high-pitched squeals ("like a child being tortured ") heard on Crimes, while Blilie's voice has grown more distinctive while maintaining the same low, robust ferocity.

== Other projects ==
Several members of the band have been or are currently involved in other projects:

- In 2025, Mark Gajadhar, Johnny Whitney and Cody Votolato, along with bassist Autry René Fulbright (Off!, …And You Will Know Us By the Trail of Dead) announced their new band, Evil Island. Their debut album, produced by Ross Robinson, will be released in mid 2026. Robinson produced ...Burn Piano Island, Burn for The Blood Brothers in 2003. A single and music video, "Tiger Baby", was released on April 14, 2026. The music video features Tim Kasher of Cursive.
- Johnny Whitney and Mark Gajadhar released an album "Chandeliers in the Savannah" in 2005 under the name Neon Blonde after the release of "Crimes", 2004. An EP was also released earlier in 2005.
- Along with members of The Locust and Yeah Yeah Yeahs, Jordan Blilie and Cody Votolato formed Head Wound City shortly after the release of Crimes and released a self-titled EP. The band regrouped and released an album 'A New Wave of Violence' on May 13, 2016.
- In 2007, Johnny Whitney and Cody Votolato joined with Jay Clark (formerly of Pretty Girls Make Graves) to start Jaguar Love. The band's first release was a limited edition self-titled EP, which was released June 3 that year. On December 29, 2007, they announced they were to begin recording their first full-length record. The record, Take Me To The Sea, was released August 19, 2008. Their second album, Hologram Jams, was released March 2, 2010.
- Johnny Whitney, along with Devin Welch and Hannah Blilie, played in The Vogue (1999–2000), which evolved into Soiled Doves (2000–2001) after the departure of their keyboardist. The Vogue released an album in 2000, As Brass As Satin. Soiled Doves released in album in 2003, Soiled Life.
- Johnny Whitney, along with his wife Amy Carlsen, started a clothing company called Crystal City Clothing. To date, they have produced shirts for Panic! at the Disco, Thursday, and Rocky Votolato. They also produced a majority of the merchandise designs for The Blood Brothers for several years.
- Jordan Blilie, Mark Gajadhar and Morgan Henderson formed the band Past Lives in late 2007, with original Blood Brothers guitarist Devin Welch. Their debut EP, Strange Symmetry, was made available for digital download in August 2008. They have also recorded a 5-song suite for Issue 7 of The Journal of Popular Noise, due June 2008. On February 23, 2010, the band released their debut full-length for Suicide Squeeze Records, Tapestry of Webs.
- Morgan Henderson has a solo electronic project by the name of O, Hunter. He has done remixes of some songs for some bands, such as Minus The Bear. He spent much of 2010 writing and recording Helplessness Blues by the Fleet Foxes, and currently is touring with them as of 2017.
- Mark Gajadhar performs as DJ Gajamagic. Under this name he has formed the group Champagne Champagne with rapper Pearl Dragon and Thomas Gray. DJ Gajamagic is also one half of WEEKEND with the other half being Ryann Donnelly from Schoolyard Heroes. In 2014, Gajadhar joined Hardly Art band Grave Babies as drummer.
- Cody Votolato is currently the guitarist in Merge Records band Telekinesis and also the touring guitarist for Cold Cave.

== Members ==
Lineup

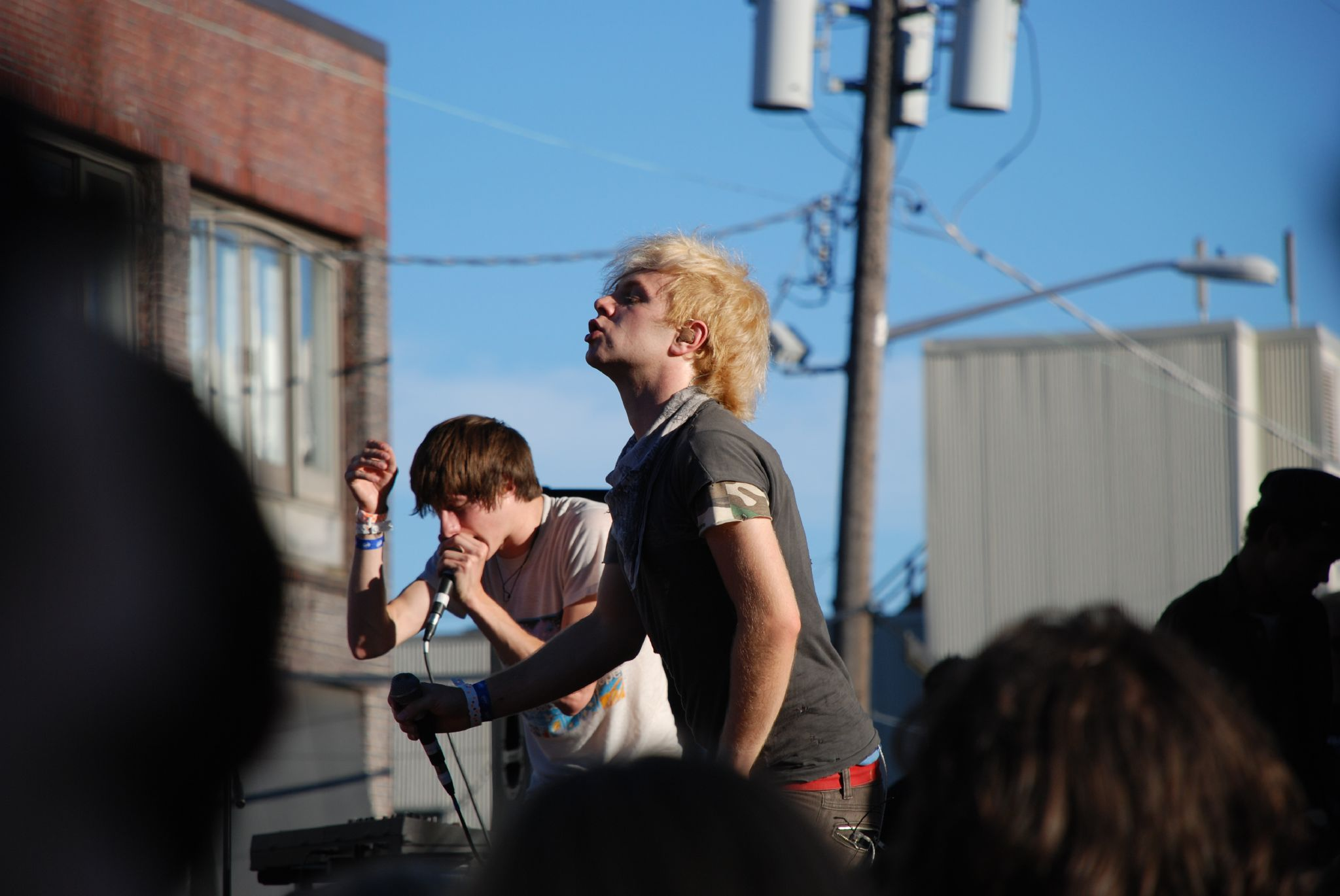

- Jordan Blilie – vocals, guitar, piano (1997–2007, 2014, 2024–present)
- Johnny Whitney – vocals, keyboards, programming (1997–2007, 2014, 2024–present)
- Mark Gajadhar – drums, percussion (1997–2007, 2014, 2024–present)
- Morgan Henderson – bass, guitar, keyboards, backing vocals (1997–2007, 2014, 2024–present)
- Cody Votolato – guitar, percussion, backing vocals (1999–2007, 2014, 2024–present)

Former members

- Devin Welch – guitar (1997–1999)

== Discography ==
=== Albums ===
- This Adultery Is Ripe (2000)
- March on Electric Children (2002)
- ...Burn, Piano Island, Burn (2003)
- Crimes (2004) No. 157 US
- Young Machetes (2006) No. 92 US

=== EPs ===
- The Blood Brothers (1997)
- Home Alive '98 split 7-inch with Stiletto (1998)
- Dynamic Sound! split 7-inch with Milemarker (1999)
- Rumors Laid Waste (2003)
- Love Rhymes with Hideous Car Wreck (2005)

=== Singles ===
- "Ambulance vs. Ambulance" (2003)
- "Love Rhymes with Hideous Car Wreck" (2004)
- "Laser Life" (2006)
- "Set Fire to the Face on Fire" (2007)

=== Music videos ===
- Ambulance vs. Ambulance (2003)
- Cecilia and the Silhouette Saloon (2003)
- Love Rhymes with Hideous Car Wreck (2004)
- Laser Life (2006)
- Set Fire to the Face on Fire (2007)

=== DVDs ===
- Jungle Rules Live (2003)
- This Is Circumstantial Evidence (2003)
- The Fest 3 (2004)

=== Other appearances ===
- The Blood Brothers produced a cover of the song Under Pressure which appeared on the Queen tribute album Dynamite With a Laser Beam.
- The band also covered Gang of Four's "Anthrax" for a tribute album that never materialized. A remix can be found on the Love Rhymes with Hideous Car Wreck EP.
- The band performed "Trash Flavored Trash" on ABC's Jimmy Kimmel Live! on September 20, 2005. The band was supposed to perform "Love Rhymes With Hideous Car Wreck", but defied the show's request.
- The band performed "Set Fire To The Face On Fire" and "Laser Life" on Season 2, Episode 6 of IFC's The Henry Rollins Show, May 18, 2007

== Family connections ==
Several members of the band have familial connections to other notable Pacific Northwest-based bands:

- Cody Votolato's older brother Rocky Votolato is a successful solo folk artist and was a member of Waxwing with Cody. His oldest brother is Sonny Votolato, who plays guitar for numerous bands, including Slender Means, Bugs in Amber, and Blue Checkered Record Player.
- Mark Gajadhar's older brother is Rudy Gajadhar, the drummer of Gatsbys American Dream and formerly of Waxwing. Rudy was in Waxwing at the same time as Cody's brother Rocky.
- Jordan Blilie's twin sister Hannah Blilie is the drummer for The Gossip.
