= Joel Brown =

Joel Brown may refer to:

- Joel Brown (hurdler) (born 1980), American hurdler
- Joel B. Brown (1872–1953), American judge
- Joel W. Brown (born 1964), American politician
