= Telekinesis! =

Telekinesis

Studio album by Telekinesis
- Released: April 7, 2009
- Recorded: September 15–28, 2008
- Genres: Indie rock, power pop, alternative rock, shoegaze
- Length: 31:47
- Label: Merge
- Producer: Chris Walla

Professional ratings
Review scores
Source	Rating
AllMusic	3/5 stars
Pitchfork Media	(6.3/10)
Planet Sound	(9/10)
Prefix	(8.5/10)

Telekinesis! is the eponymous debut studio album by the alternative rock band Telekinesis. Recorded in September 2008, the album was produced, mixed, and engineered with the help of Chris Walla (guitarist for Death Cab For Cutie), recording one song per day on analog tape. The album was released on Merge Records on April 7, 2009.

Planet Sound ranked Telekinesis! no. 1 in their "Top 50 Albums of 2009".

== Track listing ==
1. "Rust" – 2:06
2. "Coast of Carolina" – 3:32
3. "Tokyo" – 2:54
4. "Look to the East" – 3:14
5. "Awkward Kisser" – 1:45
6. "Foreign Room" – 3:30
7. "Great Lakes" – 2:54
8. "Imaginary Friend" – 2:54
9. "All of a Sudden" – 3:43
10. "Calling All Doctors" – 3:03
11. "I Saw Lightning" – 2:12

== Personnel ==
- Michael Benjamin Lerner – drums, guitar, vocals

Touring band

- Chris Staples – guitar
- David Broecker – electric guitar, acoustic guitar, bass guitar
- Jonie Broecker – bass guitar, keyboards
