= Telekinesis (band) =

American rock band

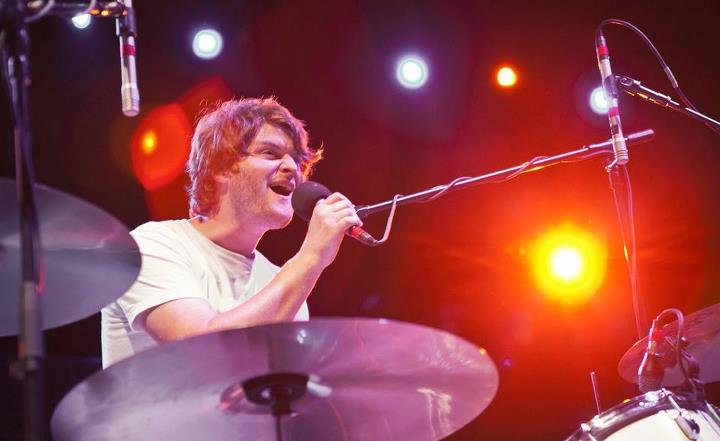
- Lerner performing in 2011

Background information
- Origin: Seattle, Washington, U.S.
- Genres: Indie rock; shoegaze; power pop
- Instruments: Vocals; guitars, bass; keyboards; drums
- Years active: 2008–present
- Label: Merge
- Members: Michael Benjamin Lerner
- Website: telekinesismusic.com

Telekinesis is an American indie rock project based in Seattle. Its moniker is a pseudonym for sole member Michael Benjamin Lerner, who single-handedly writes and performs the majority of the outfit's material. Telekinesis is signed to Merge Records.

== History ==
Michael Benjamin Lerner (born September 1, 1986) grew up in Kenmore, Washington, a suburb of Seattle. He left home at 18 to attend Sir Paul McCartney's Liverpool Institute for Performing Arts, where he studied audio recording. He is the son of the Seattle Radio presenter, Mike West (real name: Vince Lerner), now heard on Sunday mornings at Seattle's 102.5 KZOK-FM as host of Breakfast with the Beatles.

Telekinesis was signed to Merge Records in early 2009, and shortly afterward released the debut album Telekinesis! on April 7, 2009. Recorded in September 2008, the album was produced, mixed, and engineered with the help of Chris Walla (guitarist for Death Cab For Cutie), who also played on most tracks. Lerner and Walla recorded one song per day on analog tape.

Lerner cites the 1983 album Dazzle Ships, by English electronic band Orchestral Manoeuvres in the Dark (OMD), as a major influence on his work. Telekinesis covered ELO's "Can't Get It Out of My Head" for the American Laundromat Records charity album Sing Me To Sleep–Indie Lullabies, released May 2010. The outfit also covered Nirvana's "On A Plain" in 2011 for Spin magazine's exclusive tribute album, Newermind: A Tribute to Nirvana.

"Power Lines" from third album Dormarion (2013), was the title song for the Amazon show Betas (2013). It was also featured in the 2025 film Novocaine.

== Personnel ==
- Michael Benjamin Lerner – drums, guitar, bass, keys, vocals, cowbell, trombone, cello, violin, paintbrush

=== Touring members ===
- Rebecca Cole – keyboards, background vocals (2011–present)
- Jay Clancy – bass (2017–present)
- Lance Umble – electric guitar (2015–present)

=== Former touring members ===
- Eric Elbogen – bass
- Nick Vicario – electric guitar
- Cody Votolato – electric guitar
- Jason Narducy – bass
- Chris Staples – electric guitar, background vocals (2009–2011)
- David Broecker – electric guitar, acoustic guitar, bass guitar (2009–2011)
- Jonie Broecker – bass guitar, keyboards (2009–2011)

== Discography ==
=== Albums ===
- Telekinesis! – Merge, (2009)
- 12 Desperate Straight Lines – Merge, (2011)
- Dormarion – Merge, (2013)
- Ad Infinitum – Merge, (2015)
- Effluxion – Merge, (2019)

=== EPs ===
- Toulouse-Lautrec – self-released, (2008)
- Coast of Carolina – self-released, (2009)
- Parallel Seismic Conspiracies – Merge, (2010)

=== Singles ===
- "All of a Sudden" split 7-inch – Architecture, (2008)
