= Neon Blonde =

American band

- Origin: Kirkland, Seattle, Washington
- Genres: Experimental rock, post hardcore, alternative hip hop
- Years active: 2004–present
- Labels: Three One G Records, Dim Mak Records (former)
- Members: Mark Gajadhar; Johnny Whitney

Neon Blonde was a supergroup consisting of Johnny Whitney and Mark Gajadhar from The Blood Brothers. They were based in Kirkland, Washington, a suburb of Seattle. The two expanded beyond The Blood Brothers' sound by utilizing a more electronic-based sound, which included electroclash and dance-punk. Neon Blonde's music drew from many genres including post-hardcore, and experimental rock (influenced by their band The Blood Brothers and Velvet Underground's art rock), who have also teamed up with Blood Brothers members to create Head Wound City), and a more electroclash sound. Their music also featured rapping, and rapped vocals in an alternative hip hop style.

== Discography ==
- Headlines (Dim Mak Records, 2005)
- Chandeliers in the Savannah (Dim Mak Records, 2005)
