= Johnny Whitney =

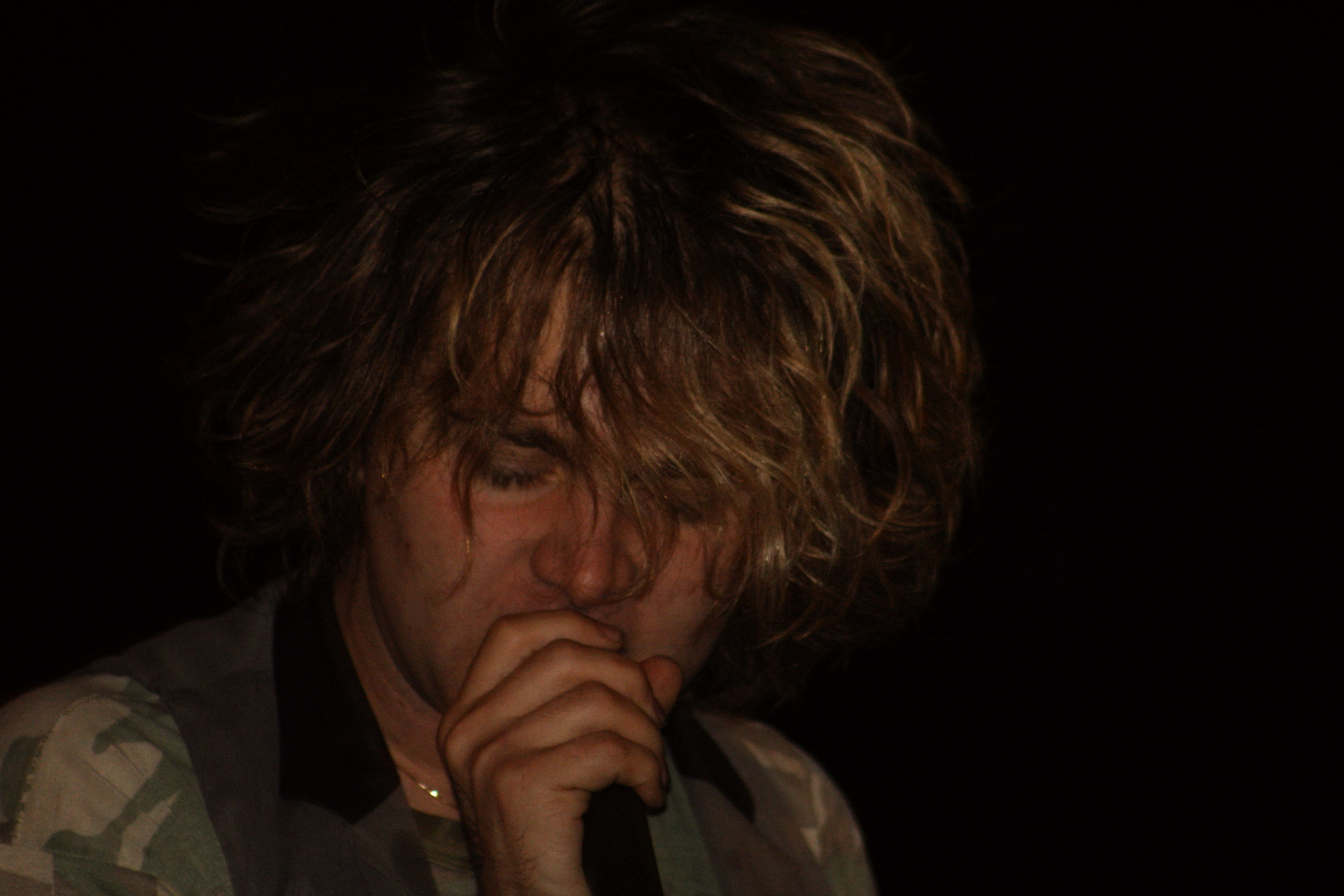
- Whitney with Jaguar Love in 2008

Background information
- Born: June 28, 1981 (age 45)
- Origin: Seattle, Washington, U.S.
- Genres: Post-hardcore, art punk, electronic
- Occupations: Musician; Software engineer
- Instruments: Vocals; keyboards
- Member of: The Blood Brothers, Evil Island
- Formerly of: Jaguar Love, Neon Blonde Soiled Doves, Vade

Johnny Whitney (born June 28, 1981) is a singer, author and multi-instrumentalist from Seattle. He is known for being one of two vocalists in the post-hardcore band The Blood Brothers and in the post-punk band Jaguar Love.

== Career ==
Whitney met fellow Blood Brothers vocalist Jordan Blilie in the seventh grade, and the two would form the band in 1997. The Blood Brothers released four albums before breaking up in June 2007, although this was not publicly announced until November of that year.

Following The Blood Brothers' breakup, Whitney and the band's guitarist Cody Votolato formed a new band, Jaguar Love, along with Pretty Girls Make Graves guitarist Jay Clark on drums. Jaguar Love released two albums before going inactive in 2010.

Whitney has also remixed songs from other artists including "Positive Tension" by Bloc Party and "Maps" by Yeah Yeah Yeahs. He is also featured on Daryl Palumbo's remix of Cage's song "Shoot Frank".

Dating back to his days in The Blood Brothers, Whitney also operates a clothing company named Crystal City. He also designed the album cover for the band's third album Crimes, which he said took several months to complete while using Photoshop in the band van while on tour.

In the mid-2010s, Whitney quit music and relocated to the San Francisco Bay Area to work as a software engineer for Netflix. The Blood Brothers reunited in 2014 and again in 2024 to tour again.

In October 2025, he announced that he would be forming a new band, Evil Island, with former bandmates Cody Votolato and Mark Gajadhar as well as Autry Fulbright II, formerly of OFF!.

== Style ==
Whitney's shrieked vocals and screaming have been noted for their self-described "feminine energy", which stood out in a more masculine-heavy hardcore punk scene. The Seattle Weekly once wrote, "Johnny Whitney is biologically male, but the power of his bloodcurdling shriek... is something else entirely." Jordan Billie, his co-vocalist in The Blood Brothers, said that Whitney "was taking some fairly feminine qualities and putting them in a very violent context".

Between ...Burn, Piano Island, Burn (2003) and Crimes (2004), Whitney took vocal lessons to increase his range, which focused on running scales. He was inspired by the course that Cedric Bixler-Zavala took between At the Drive-In and The Mars Volta.

During the peak of The Blood Brothers' popularity in the mid-2000s, Whitney faced public backlash for his appearance and style. He recalled attendees calling him a "faggot" and having a shoe thrown at his head during a show. While playing in Portugal in 2007, Whitney said he was catcalled because spectators believed he was a woman, only to then be booed once he spoke and revealed himself as a man. Speaking in 2024 about the band's influence on the queer and transgender communities, he said: "That's no longer something that's a cultural norm. Just the idea of a band with two singers that are skinny, femmy dudes was disgusting to a lot of mainstream audiences seeing AFI."
