= Sass (music) =

Subgenre of post-hardcore

- Etymology: Sass
- Other names: White belt hardcore
- Stylistic origins: Screamo, dance-punk, post-punk, post-hardcore
- Cultural origins: Late 1990s, United States, particularly San Diego and Seattle
- Derivative forms: Dance-punk revival; swancore; scenecore

Subgenres
- Girlfriend sass; white belt grind (scene grind)

Fusion genres
- Sassy screamo

Local scenes
- San Diego sound

Other topics
- Pop screamo, crunkcore, scene subculture, queercore, hipster, mathcore, electro-punk, digital hardcore, post-punk revival, crank wave

Sass (/sæs/), or white belt hardcore, is a broadly-defined subgenre of post-hardcore that merges screamo with elements of dance-punk and post-punk. Characterized by erratic stage performances, flamboyant mannerisms, homoerotic lyrical content, dance beats and lisping vocals, the genre was pioneered during the late 1990s.

During its initial popularity, sass was defined more by its lyrical, aesthetic and performance elements, rather than music. In particular, it was split into a series of distinct musical styles: the mainline post-punk and screamo-inspired post-hardcore sass of the Blood Brothers, the VSS and the Plot to Blow Up the Eiffel Tower; the dance punk-leaning girlfriend sass sound of Q and Not U, Hot Hot Heat and !!!; the screamo-leaning sassy screamo music of JR Ewing and later Orchid; and the mathcore and grindcore influenced white belt grind sound of the Locust, an Albatross and early Daughters.

Under the influence of the Nation of Ulysses, bands in the San Diego screamo scene and signed to its label Three One G Records, incorporated flamboyant elements of post-punk and gothic rock. These "proto-sass" groups included Antioch Arrow, Crimson Curse, Brainiac, Le Shok and Milemaker. Sass was pioneered around 1998 by the Blood Brothers, the VSS and later Frodus. The genre acted as an intersection between the screamo and post-hardcore scene and what would become the hipster subculture. Its girlfriend sass subgenre experienced mainstream crossover in the early to mid-2000s, when A.R.E. Weapons, Death from Above 1979 and the Rapture became pioneers of the dance-punk revival. Traditional sass declined in popularity around 2003, and had disappeared entirely by 2005.

Sass' visual identity was influential upon the development of the hipster and scene subcultures, as well as other post-hardcore subgenres such as swancore, scene grind and scenecore. The genre was repopularized in the late 2010s by SeeYouSpaceCowboy, who self-identified their fusion of sass and metalcore as sasscore, a term which soon became a popular synonym for sass. During the 2020s, the genre experienced a surge in new bands, particularly its white belt grind subgenre, including the Callous Daoboys.

== Etymology ==
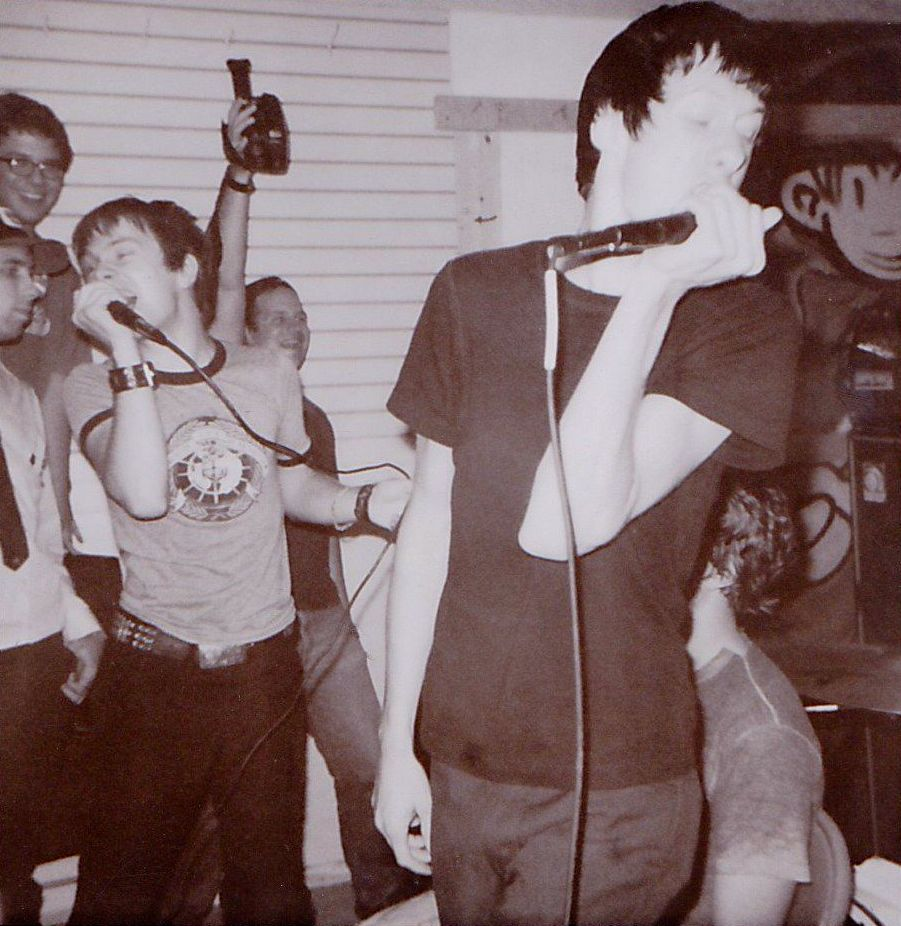
The Blood Brothers were the forefront act in sass

The name sass was derived from sass, referencing the genre's flamboyant vocal expressions and lyrics. In 1990, the Nation of Ulysses vocalist Ian Svenonius, an influence upon the genre, was voted by the teen magazine Sassy as the "Sassiest Boy In America". Svenonius submitted himself to the competition, later stating in an interview with the The Washington Post that "To me, different qualities define sassiness: disrespect to authority, to be youthful and zestful, and be sharply dressed". A January 1993 issue of Maximum Rocknroll called the band the "sultans of sass". While many sass bands crossed over into the mainstream, the name "sass" was only used in the hardcore scene during its initial popularity. In the mainstream, it was more often called hardcore or screamo.

Its synonym white belt hardcore originated from how many musicians and fans of the genre wore white belts, which was controversial in the hardcore scene due to its perceived effeminacy.

Around 2018, SeeYouSpaceCowboy began to self-identify as sasscore, a portmanteau of sass and metalcore that the band considered themselves to have coined, to clarify their influences from both styles. In the following years, the term became a popular synonym for all sass; however, in a 2021 article, BrooklynVegan editor Andrew Sacher expressed that "sasscore" encompassed a narrower selection of bands than simply "sass", excluding the softer, less hardcore-based sound of the Blood Brothers, Death From Above 1979 and Hot Hot Heat. In a 2021 interview, the band's vocalist Connie Sgarbossa stated of the term's use as synonym that "It's kind of funny that 'sasscore' has become such a thing, because I came up with that stupid genre tag for SpaceCowboy back in the day, and there’s become this like cult around sasscore. I think people think that’s what they actually called it back then." In a 2004 article by Loyola College in Maryland student newspaper The Grayhound, the Blood Brothers vocalist Jordan Blilie was noted as self-identifying his band as "sasscore", noting his preference for the term over screamo.

== Characteristics ==
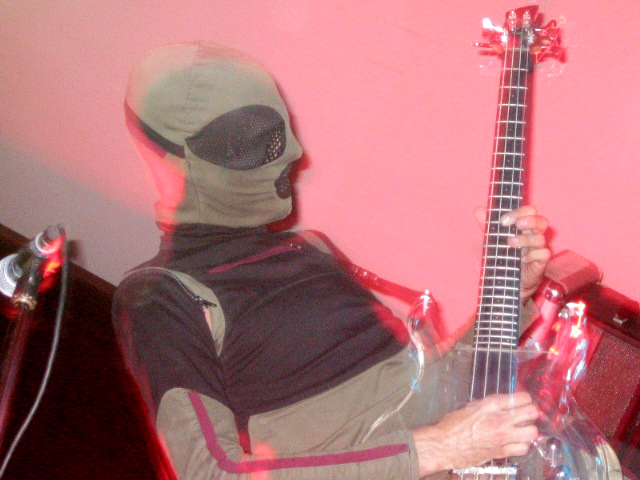
Justin Pearson helped to pioneer sass with his band the Crimson Curse and white belt grind with the Locust

Sass is characterized by overtly flamboyant mannerisms, homoerotic lyrical content, synthesizers, dance beats and a lisping vocal style. It incorporates sarcastic vocal intonation hand claps, skronky, feminine, homoerotic fashion, erotic lyrical themes, dissonant riffs, flamboyance and chaotic energy. Vocals and guitars are often high pitched.

Sass was the result of a brief subcultural moment that was the intersecting origin point for both the hipster and scene subcultures, at a time when both names were synonymous. According to a 2014 Stuff You Will Hate article, sass was less of a unified sound, and more of a performance and esthetic style that incorporated certain musical elements to support its live performances. These included vocalists placing their hands on their hips or into their pants. Maximum Rocknroll writer Negative Tom noted that many bands cited the influence of the MC5 on their music, though questioned the legitimacy.

Sass bands often take influence from a wide variety of styles including post-punk, new wave, disco, electronic, dance-punk, grindcore, noise rock, metalcore, mathcore and beatdown hardcore. Punk Planet writer Melissa Geils noted it as being closer to rock music and more artful than conventional hardcore, making use of dissonant guitar work and screaming.

== History ==
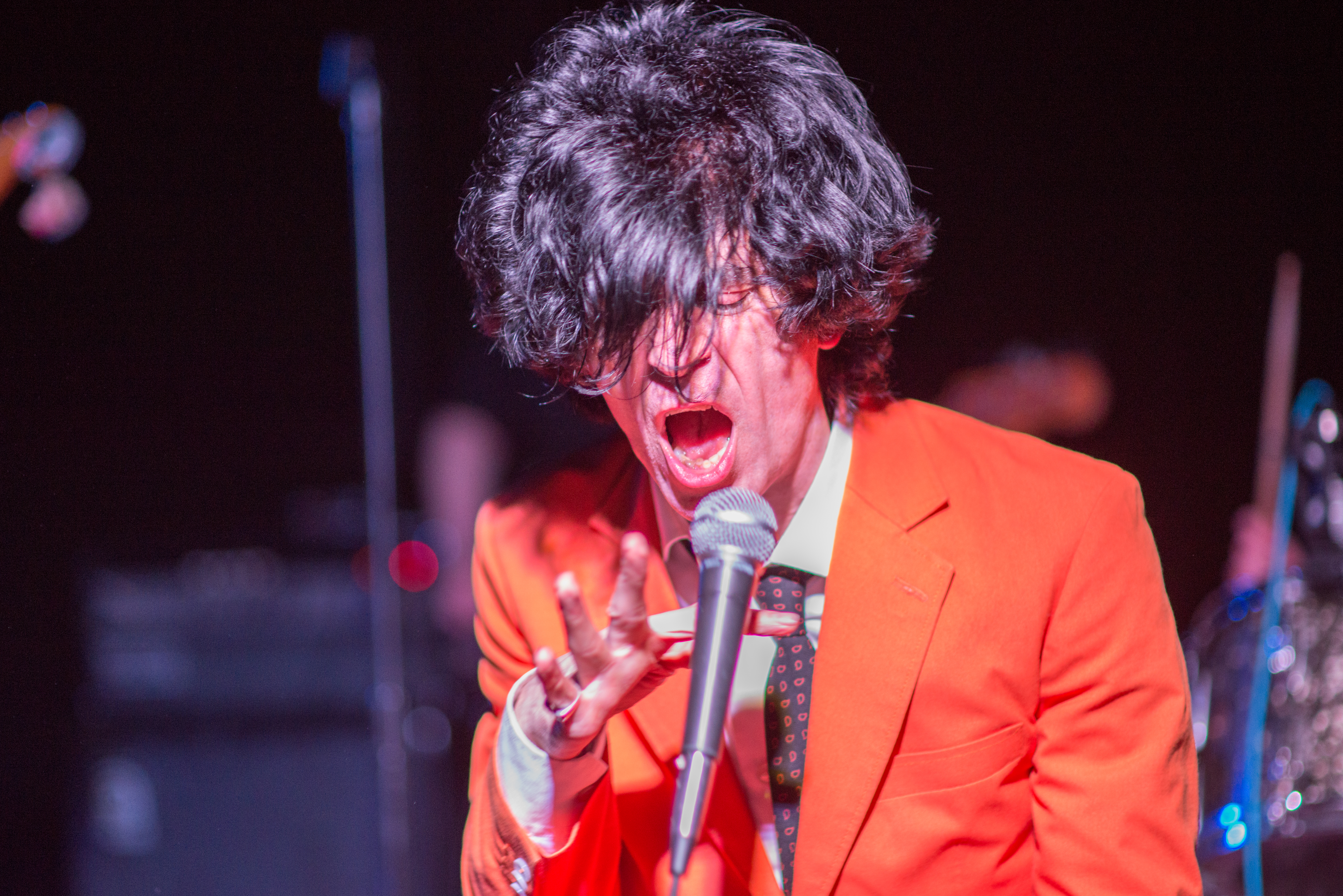
Ian Svenonius of the Nation of Ulysses, an influence upon the development of sass

=== Precusors ===
The origins of sass trace back to the Nation of Ulysses, who formed in Washington, D.C., in 1988. The band expanded upon post-hardcore by being fashion-conscious and creating dancable music. Under their influence, bands in mid-1990s San Diego screamo scene began to embrace elements of post-punk and gothic rock into their sound, including the Crimson Curse, Spanakorzo and Antioch Arrow on Gems of Masochism (1995), forming a "proto-sass" sound. Vice Media writer David Anthony stated that in the late 2000s, "Detractors would often lay the scourge of white belts and so-called 'sass-core' at" the feet of Justin Pearson, vocalist for Crimson Curse and the Locust. Across North America, many screamo and post-hardcore bands followed a similar progression. Following the 1993 disbandment of San Fransico's Portraits of Past, the majority of its final lineup formed the Audience, who adopted synthesizers akin to new wave and a visual style influenced by gothic rock and glam rock, Rhode Island's Six Finger Satellite adopted elements of no wave and disco music on Severe Exposure (1995) and Washington state's Satisfact adopted post-punk and new wave synthesizers. Other proto-sass bands were Brainiac, Le Shok and Milemaker.

=== Origins (1998–2001) ===
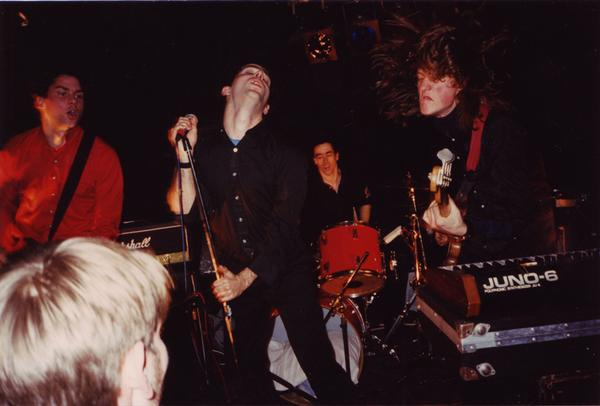
The VSS were an early pioneer of sass

During the late 1990s, hardcore punk and, in particular, screamo experienced a surge in popularity, when it was adopted by musicians outside of the genre's norm. One group of these was the subculture that would later be called hipsters, who incorporated more artistic and feminine elements, particularly elements to encourage dancing. Sass solidified itself as a genre around 1998, as music began to be released by pioneers the VSS and the Blood Brothers, who influenced the Plot to Blow Up the Eiffel Tower, These Arms Are Snakes and later Frodus to continue the sound. The centre of the scene was the record label Sound Virus. The genre was explicitly confrontational towards the hypermasculinity of tough guy hardcore, straight edge and powerviolence, which dominated the hardcore scene at the time. For this reason, it experienced opposition from these groups, as well as more politically correct members of the scene.

Many of the early bands in the genre were signed to San Diego's Three One G and Los Angeles' Gold Standard Laboratories. Amongst them, major influences outside of hardcore included the dance-punk of Gang of Four's debut album Entertainment!, krautrock of Can and Kraftwerk, the glam rock of T. Rex, Sparks and David Bowie, no wave of Liquid Liquid and power pop of Cheap Trick. In a 2016 interview with AV Club, Hot Hot Heat singer Steve Bays stated "I thought it felt way more punk rock to add melodies at the time. To put out an album that was energetic and dancey and—I hate this word—poppy".

=== Mainstream crossover and decline (2001–2005) ===
Sass was closely related to the dance-punk revival of the early to mid-2000s, with sass band A.R.E. Weapons, formed in 1999, being one of the earliest bands in the Williamsburg, Brooklyn dance-punk revival scene. Around 2001, many sass bands began adopting a sound closer to the White Stripes. Sass crossed over into the mainstream around 2002, following the release of the Faint's Danse Macabre (2001), Hot Hot Heat's Make Up the Breakdown (2002) and !!!'s !!! (2002). The most commercially successful post-sass dance-punk band was Death from Above 1979 and their debut album You're a Woman, I'm a Machine (2004), with the Rapture's Echoes and Q And Not U's Power too furthering the movement that year. The dance-punk revival that was quickly adopted by groups outside of the hardcore scene, experiencing major mainstream attention through the release of the Killers' "Somebody Told Me" and Franz Ferdinand's "Take Me Out" (both 2004).

The Blood Brothers' third album ...Burn, Piano Island, Burn (2003) brought conventional sass to mainstream attention, with BrooklynVegan editor Andrew Sacher naming it as "one of the most important post-hardcore albums of its generation"

In the hardcore scene, sass began to decline in popularity around 2003, and had disappeared entirely by 2005.

=== Revived interest (2010–present) ===
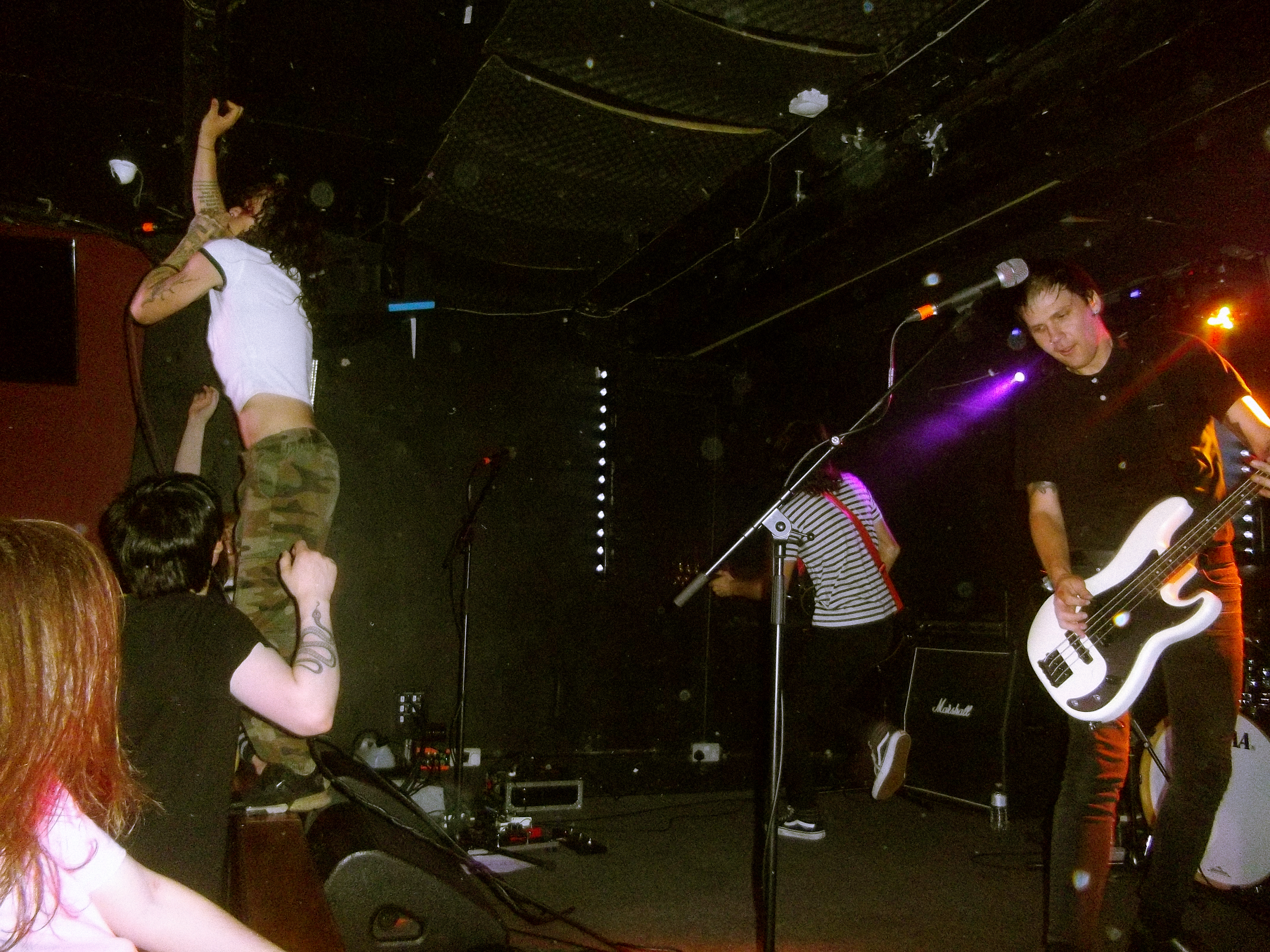
SeeYouSpaceCowboy led a sass revival in the late 2010s and 2020s

During the early 2010s, there was a revived interest in sass amongst fans active on the screamo message board Cross My Heart With a Knife (CMHWAK). By 2018, a sass revival had formed fronted by Gas Up Yr Hearse, Dotgiffromgod and SeeYouSpaceCowboy. This wave used a heavier take on the genre, incorporating elements of metalcore and grindcore. This scene originated from the screamo scene, with many of the artists being signed to RVA Records. Unlike the genre's originators, these bands generally self-identified as sass. By the end of the decade, its forefront acts were Circuit Circuit and SeeYouSpaceCowboy. Of the revival, SeeYouSpaceCowboy's vocalist Connie Sgarbossa stated "SpaceCowboy was initially, the idea of just throwing a bunch of shit in a blender and seeing what happens and making it work. So that was a huge part of what pushed us to bring the sass back, to do really heavy stuff and still be weird". By the early 2020s, they had shifted their sound away from sass, in favor of metalcore and pop screamo.

Screamo experienced a major resurgence in the 2020s, largely practiced by generation Z. It encompassed a wide variety of styles such as traditional screamo, emoviolence and white belt grind. This wave was international, with a scene developing in Indonesia, based around Zegema Beach Records, with groups such as Hallam Foe.

== Stylistic divisions ==
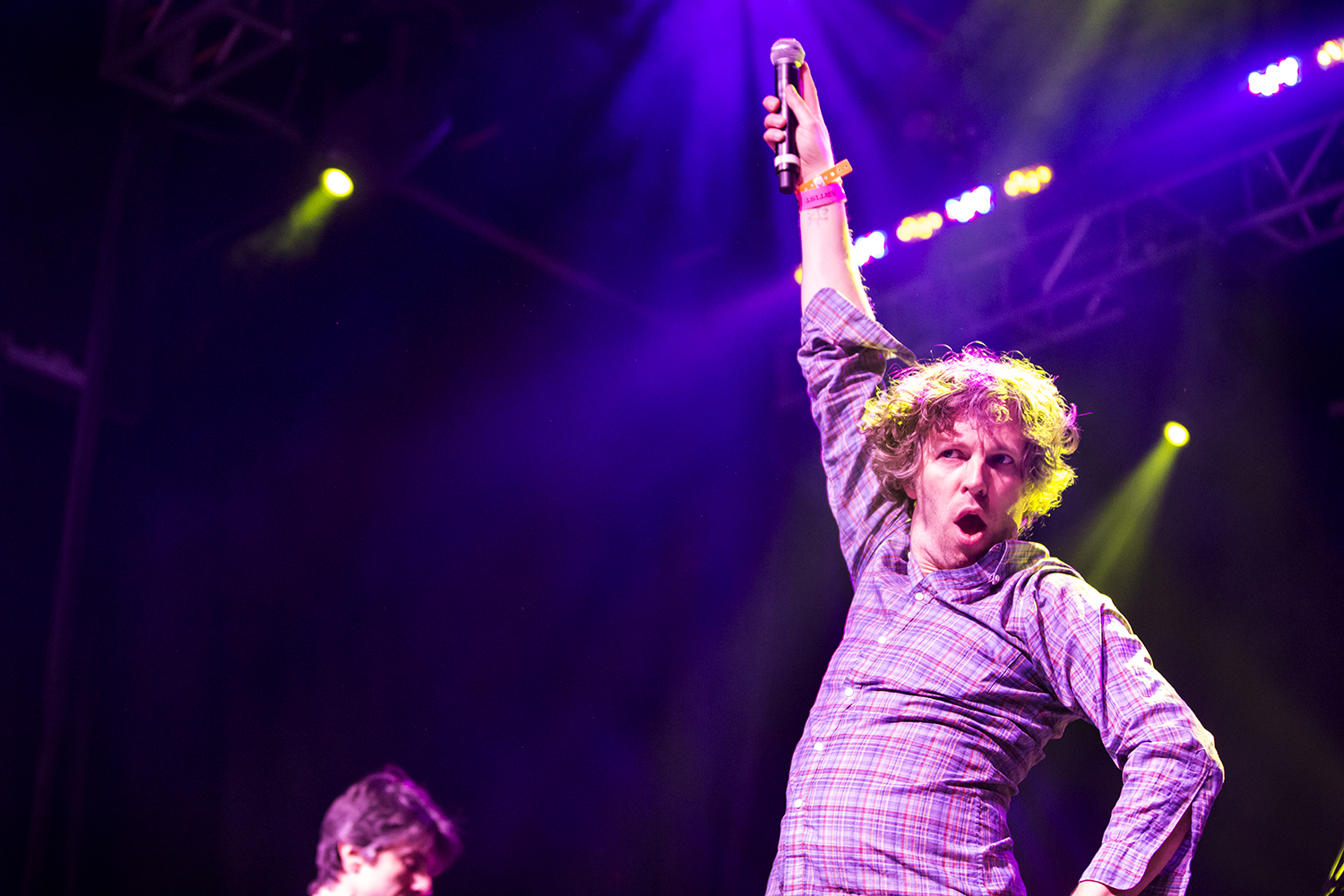
!!! helped to establish sass' mainstream crossover in the early to mid-2000s, by pioneering the dance-punk leaning subgenre, girlfriend sass.

=== Girlfriend sass ===
Girlfriend sass is a subgenre of sass that emphasizes its dance-punk influence. It straddled the line between the hardcore scene and the mainstream dance-punk revival of the early 2000s. With Q and Not U, Black Eyes, the Faint and Milemaker been prominent in the underground, while Head Automatica, Hot Hot Heat, !!! and the Rapture experienced commercial success. The term was tongue-in-cheek, ironically referencing its softer sound as appealing to fans' girlfriends, despite the fans often being subject to homophobia.

=== Sassy screamo ===
Sassy screamo is a subgenre of sass that reincorporated the genre's screamo influence. Stuff You Will Hate called x Vincent Price's Orphan Powered Death Machine x and After School Knife Fight "the zenith of sassy screamo". Notable acts included JR Ewing and later Orchid. According to New Times Broward-Palm Beach, the name is derogatory.

=== White belt grind ===
White belt grind is a style of sass that is influenced by mathcore and grindcore. It was pioneered by the Locust, the Number Twelve Looks Like You, An Albatross and early Daughters. A 2005 Maximum Rocknroll called the Locust "emperors of the white belt". During the mid-2000s, Heavy Heavy Low Low became one of the most prominent groups in the genre, with the supergroup Head Wound City also adopted the style. It experienced a revival in the late 2010s with SeeYouSpaceCowboy and the Callous Daoboys.

=== Scene grind ===
Scene grind grew out of white belt grind in the mid-2000s, fronted by See You Next Tuesday and Iwrestledabearonce. It was mostly based around the social networking service Myspace. Scenegrind incorporated synthesizers into a style particularly influenced by Daughters' erratic style and irregular song structures. Pioneered by the Number Twelve Looks Like You, it was made largely by members of the scene subculture. It included bands such as Psyopus, Dance Club Massacre and the Crinn. Many bands in the genre incorporated elements of deathcore, including Arsonists Get All The Girls and the Irish Front.

== Legacy ==
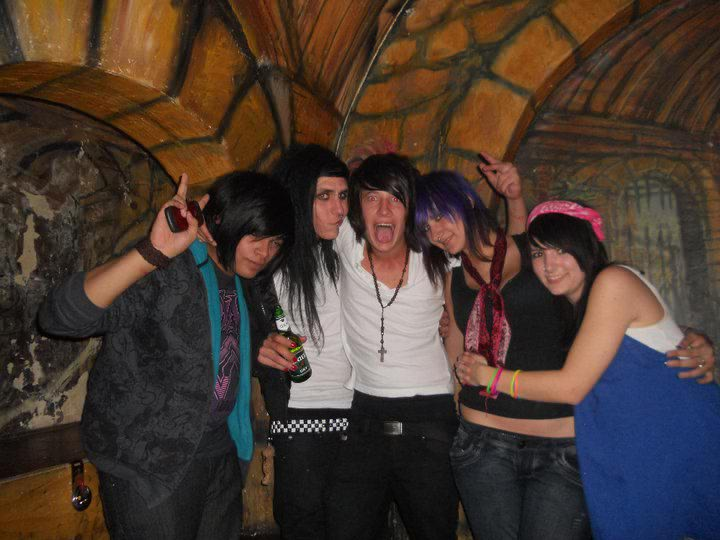
Sass' fashion style was influential on the development of the scene subculture

The influence of both sass and the fashioncore of Orange County, California bands Eighteen Visions and Bleeding Through eventually developed the scene subculture. While fashioncore and scene bands were primarily influenced by sass' visual style, late 2000s scenecore bands including the Devil Wears Prada and Drop Dead, Gorgeous, reincorporated many musical elements of sass such as keyboards and flamboyancy.

During the late 1990s, many other bands in post-hardcore began to incorporate elements of sass, particularly its vocal inflections and dance elements, including Glassjaw, At the Drive-In and Refused on The Shape of Punk to Come (1998). Many of these sass elements were retained from these artists into the pioneering of the swancore genre, by Dance Gavin Dance, Tides of Man and A Lot Like Birds.

Sass's influence permeated into many other genres, including the "sass pop" of Head Automatica and "sass metalcore" of Every Time I Die's second album Hot Damn.

Sass was a major influence upon the dance-punk revival of the early 2000s, with prominent groups in the movement including Interpol and Death from Above 1979 originating from the sass scene.

In the 2020s, Screamo on the United States' east coast, particularly Virginia, adopted the name "orange belt" in reference to white belt. The term was coined by Autumn Sonata vocalist Ian Lee.

== See also ==
- Risecore
- Pop screamo
- Crunkcore
- Crank wave
