= Cody Votolato =

American musician

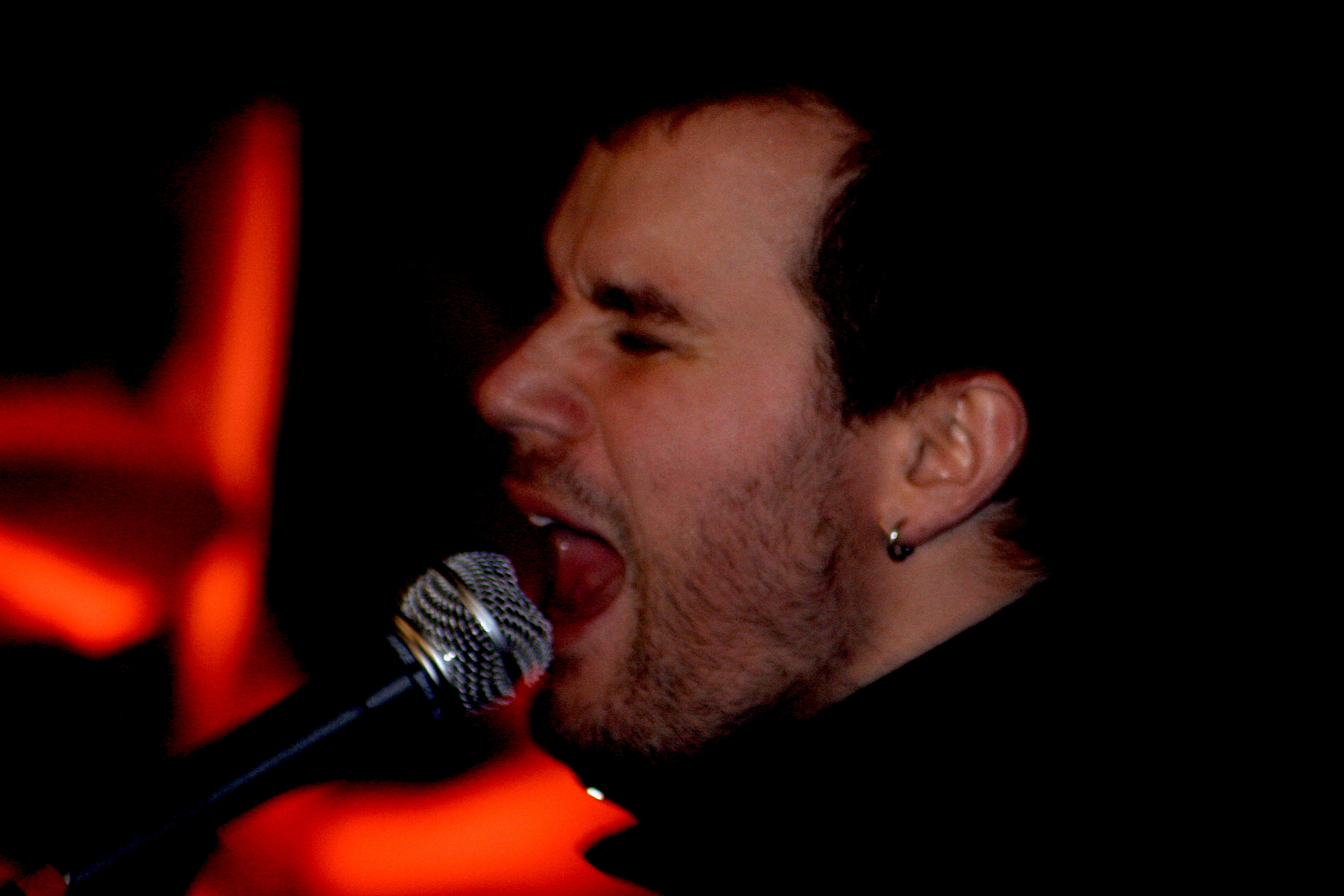
- Votolato with Jaguar Love (2008)

Background information
- Born: 20 May 1982 (age 44); Texas, United States
- Origin: Seattle, Washington, United States
- Genres: Post-hardcore, folk, indie rock
- Instruments: Guitar, vocals
- Years active: 1997–present
- Labels: V2 Records, Three One G
- Formerly of: The Blood Brothers; Waxwing; Head Wound City; Jaguar Love; Telekinesis; Cold Cave

Cody Votolato (born 20 May 1982) is a musician from Redmond, Washington, best known for being the guitarist in the post-hardcore band The Blood Brothers. He grew up in the eastside suburbs of Seattle. Cody attended Redmond High School with his bandmates in the late 1990s when the band originally formed, graduating Spring of 2000. His accomplished thrashy and discordant style, exhibited in early Blood Brothers albums and in Head Wound City, has evolved into a more melodic and experimental sound in recent years. Votolato's older brother Rocky Votolato is a folk musician and solo artist who played in the band Waxwing with his brother, as well as with Rudy Gajadhar, the older brother of The Blood Brothers' drummer Mark Gajadhar. Votolato also contributed artwork to The Blood Brothers' album ...Burn, Piano Island, Burn. On 4 September 2012, it was announced that Cody has joined Cold Cave as touring guitarist.

== Bands ==
- Cold Cave
- Telekinesis
- The Blood Brothers
- Head Wound City - a side project involving Jordan Blilie from The Blood Brothers as well as Justin Pearson and Gabe Serbian of The Locust and Nick Zinner of Yeah Yeah Yeahs
- Jaguar Love - a collaboration with Johnny Whitney from The Blood Brothers and J. Clark of Pretty Girls Make Graves
- Waxwing - a now-defunct Post-Hardcore Band with his brother, solo artist Rocky Votolato on Vocals.
