= Jordan Blilie =

American vocalist

Jordan Blilie (born June 10, 1981) is the American vocalist for the bands Past Lives and Head Wound City, best known as the co-lead vocalist and co-lyricist for The Blood Brothers, from 1997 until their breakup in 2007.

Blilie is married to Zoë Verkuylen, a Canadian artist manager and tour manager, formerly of The Red Light Sting.

His twin sister Hannah Blilie is the drummer for the band Gossip.
