= Music of California =

In the United States, California is commonly associated with the film, music, and arts industries; there are numerous world-famous Californian musicians. New genres of music, such as surf rock and third wave ska, have their origins in California.

== Official state symbols ==
The official state song of California is "I Love You, California", written by F. B. Silverwood and composed by Alfred F. Frankenstein of the Los Angeles Symphony Orchestra. It was designated the state song in 1951. Other songs, including "California, Here I Come", have also been candidates for additional state songs since 1951, but in 1988 the official standing of "I Love You, California" was confirmed.

California also has an official fife and drum band, the California Consolidated Drum Band, which was so designated in 1997.

The state's official folk dance is the square dance, which has been found in California since at least the Gold Rush.

== Indigenous music ==
Many groups of Indigenous peoples of California lived and continue to live within the current geographic boundaries of California, before and since colonization by Europe.

In the late 19th century, American Indian music began to be incorporated by classical composers throughout the country, known as the Indianist movement. In San Francisco, Carlos Troyer published compositions like Apache Chief Geronimo's Own Medicine song, with a piano accompaniment by Troyer.

== Early foreign influences ==
The earliest Spanish and English explorers in California encountered Native Americans and established missions to convert them to Christianity. Chanted prayers and hymns were often used, and choirs were eventually formed; many missions formed Native American choirs among recent converts.

As California's European, Asian, and African population increased in the 19th century, the state became the earliest West Coast territory admitted to the United States. As on the East Coast, music at the time was dominated by popular minstrel shows and the sale of sheet music. Performers included the Sacramento-born Hyers Sisters and Black Patti.

Chinese immigrants came to California to work on the transcontinental railroad and soon became a large minority in the state; the San Francisco Chinese Opera House was built in 1880. However, two years later the Chinese Exclusion Act was passed in order to prevent more immigration. The visit of King Kalakaua of Hawaii in 1874 saw the Hawaiian national anthem, "Hawaii Ponoi" (written by the king) set to music by Henri Berger. In the 1880s, Carlos Troyer became a prominent composer, incorporating Spanish and Zuni influences. Polish composer Anton de Kontski's "Polish Patrol" and "Awakening the Lion" were also quite popular.

=== Spanish and Mexican influence ===
Manuela García was the most prolific performer recorded by Charles Fletcher Lummis

The state's large Mexican population brought traditional folk guitar to California, including virtuoso Luis T. Romero. The Spanish missions in California brought European music to the area. From the late 18th century to the late 19th century, many visitors to California remarked on the uniqueness of the Spanish language music in California. This music was distinctively Californian, different from both Mexican and Spanish music of the time (though many elements are found throughout these traditions).

With the arrival of many Americans from the East Coast, as well as immigrants from as far away as China, however, Spanish folk music began to dwindle in popularity in California. Charles Fletcher Lummis, himself an immigrant to California, recorded many kinds of Spanish and Native American folk music for the Southwest Society of the Archaeological Institute of America. Later in the 20th century, other revivalists like Gabriel Eulogius Ruiz and Al Pill helped keep Spanish-California traditions alive.

== Mexican and Latin American music in California today ==
Because of its historical and cultural connections to Mexico and strong Hispanic influences, California hosts numerous Spanish language radio stations, variety music shows and local based Mariachi and Mexican folk music bands. Popular music such as Ranchera, Norteño, son music can be heard on many radio stations across the state from the San Francisco Bay Area and Sacramento to the southern end of the Central Valley and down to San Diego.

Southern California has been home to Spanish language singers and musicians for over 100 years. La Pena Cultural Center in Berkeley has worked promote Salsa and traditional Latin American music to encourage a strong cultural connection between Californians and Latin Americans.

Mexican American musical artists from California vary widely in musical genre, from traditional Mexican music to Alternative Metal; among the most celebrated are Zack de la Rocha (of Rage Against the Machine), Chris Montez, Chino Moreno (of the Deftones), Ozomatli, Jenni Rivera, Los Tigres del Norte, Robert Trujillo (of Metallica, Suicidal Tendencies, and Infectious Grooves), La Santa Cecilia, Carlos Santana, and Ritchie Valens.

== 1930s and 1940s ==
Sidney Robertson Cowell, an ethnographer from San Francisco, collected a trove of American folk songs for the WPA Northern California Folk Music Project (1938–1940), which she initiated.

== 1950s and 1960s ==
=== Bakersfield sound ===
In the 1950s and early 1960s, country music was dominated by the slick Nashville sound that stripped the genre of its gritty roots. The town of Bakersfield saw the rise of the Bakersfield sound as a reaction against Nashville, led by people such as Buck Owens and future star Merle Haggard.

=== Folk ===
California was an important part of the American folk music revival of the late 1950s and early 1960s, led by the San Francisco Bay Area group the Kingston Trio. Their first hit, the 1958 single "Tom Dooley" (a Billboard #1 Hot 100 hit), sold more than 3 million copies and inspired the addition of a "folk" category to the Grammy awards the following year. The Trio's success inspired many pop-folk groups (recognizable by the performance of traditional or traditional-sounding music and use of acoustic rather than electric guitars), including California-based The Limeliters. California venues like the Hungry i promoted the genre and several major albums were recorded there. Folk music faded in popularity after the mid-1960s British Invasion, but merged with the British sound to create folk rock, pioneered by the Los Angeles band the Byrds.

=== R&B ===
R&B group the Robins formed in San Francisco and helped establish the doo-wop sound. Members of the Robins went on to form the Coasters in Los Angeles, alongside the Platters, the Penguins, the Flairs, the Cadets, the Hollywood Flames, and the Blossoms. Johnny Otis was born in Vallejo. Etta James was born in Los Angeles.

=== Chicano rock ===
Chicano artists Ritchie Valens, the Champs, Cannibal & the Headhunters, thee Midniters, the Premiers, the Blendells, and El Chicano emerged from southern California in this period.

=== Pop ===
Vocal group the Lennon Sisters formed in Venice.

The Walker Brothers, formed in Los Angeles in 1964, achieved success in the United Kingdom during the British Invasion.

=== Surf rock, sunshine pop, and the California Sound ===
In the early 1960s, youth in southern California became enamored with surf rock groups, many instrumental, like the Beach Boys, Jan and Dean, the Chantays, Royale Monarchs, the Honeys, the Bel-Airs, the Challengers, and the Surfaris. Surf rock is said to have been invented by Dick Dale with his 1961 (see 1961 in music) album Let's Go Trippin'. Surf rock's popularity ended in the mid-1960s with the coming of psychedelic music, however bands like Papa Doo Run Run have continued to perform and tour for the last 40 years.

=== Garage rock ===
The Standells, the Seeds, the Leaves, and the Music Machine formed in the Los Angeles area. Count Five, Syndicate of Sound, and the Chocolate Watchband formed in San Jose.

=== Psychedelic rock ===
The late 1960s saw San Francisco rise as the center for psychedelic rock and a mecca for hippies. Haight-Ashbury became a countercultural capital, and bands like Jefferson Airplane, Loading Zone, Quicksilver Messenger Service, the Ace of Cups, Country Joe and the Fish, Santana, the Charlatans, Big Brother & the Holding Company, and the Grateful Dead helped to launch the blues- and folk-rock scene; other bands, like Moby Grape and the Flamin' Groovies used a more country-influenced sound, while Cold Blood and Sons of Champlin incorporated R&B and Orkustra played a sort of free-form psychedelia. Of all these bands, the Grateful Dead were undoubtedly the longest-lasting of all. They continued recording and performing for several decades under the leadership of Jerry Garcia, experimenting with a wide variety of folk, country, and bluegrass, and becoming a part of the jam band phenomenon.

Hollywood's Sunset Strip area produced bands like the Byrds, the Doors, Love, Buffalo Springfield, Strawberry Alarm Clock, and the Seeds. The Byrds went on to become a major folk-rock act, helping to popularize some of Bob Dylan's compositions and eventually launching the careers of folk-rockers like David Crosby and country-rock fusionist Gram Parsons.

Frank Zappa and Captain Beefheart, both from Antelope Valley, started their aggressively experimental music careers during the late 1960s.

The band Iron Butterfly is another noted California psychedelic band, coming out of San Diego.

==== San Francisco psychedelic scene ====
This era began in about 1965, when The Matrix, the first folk club in San Francisco, opened; Jefferson Airplane, then a newly formed and unknown band, performed that night. Later that year, a band known as the Warlocks became the Grateful Dead, performing at The Fillmore, which was to become a major musical venue in the area. Jefferson Airplane became the first San Francisco psychedelic band signed to a major label, followed soon after by Sopwith Camel. In 1966, the first acid test was held, and the use of the drug LSD became a more prominent part of psychedelic rock, and music in general. One of the first albums from the scene was Country Joe and the Fish's Electric Music for the Mind and Body (1967). A year later, the band Blue Cheer released Vincebus Eruptum, which launched a national hit with a cover of Eddie Cochran's "Summertime Blues"; Blue Cheer is now regarded as a progenitor of heavy metal.

=== Experimental ===
The San Francisco Tape Music Center was founded in 1962 by composers Morton Subotnick, born in Los Angeles, and Ramon Sender. Under a commission, synthesizer pioneer Don Buchla, born in South Gate, created his first modular synthesizer in 1963 and started Buchla Electronic Musical Instruments.

The Mothers of Invention was formed in 1964 in Pomona, California, originally known as the Soul Giants, the band's first lineup included Ray Collins, David Coronado, Ray Hunt, Roy Estrada, and Jimmy Carl Black. Frank Zappa was asked to take over as the guitarist following a fight between Collins and Coronado, the band's original saxophonist/leader. Zappa insisted that they perform his original material, and on Mother's Day in 1965, changed their name to the Mothers. Record executives demanded that the name be changed, and so "out of necessity," Zappa later said, "we became the Mothers of Invention."

== 1970s and 1980s ==
The early part of this era was dominated by country rock acts such as the Eagles and Poco, and singer-songwriters such as Jackson Browne and Joni Mitchell. There were also funk acts that were prominent such as War from the South Central (now South) district of Los Angeles, Sly and the Family Stone and Tower of Power from Oakland. Santana blended rock, jazz, funk, and Latin music. Latin R&B band Tierra formed in Los Angeles in this period. This period also saw a number of difficult-to-classify acts arising who did not sell many records, but proved to be very influential on things to come, such as Kim Fowley, Captain Beefheart, Sparks, and Fanny, all from Los Angeles, who had been active in the 1960s but reached their artistic peaks during this era. Fowley would go on to manage and produce the all-female punk-metal group, the Runaways. The Los Angeles scene of this period also produced the Go-Go's and the Motels. Boundary-stretching singer-songwriters such as Rickie Lee Jones and Warren Zevon (both originally from Chicago but whose careers developed in California) emerged to great critical acclaim.

The Tubes, who mixed progressive rock with wild theatricality, and Journey, formed from among some of Carlos Santana's sidemen and eventually experiencing a peak as one of the most popular AOR acts in the United States, were virtually the only acts from San Francisco to gain any sort of fame in the mid-1970s. During the 1980s, Journey found further success, as did Huey Lewis and the News who combined elements of pub rock with doo-wop and soul, and Starship which formed from its earlier incarnation of Jefferson Starship.

Californians Stevie Nicks and Lindsey Buckingham joined Fleetwood Mac in the 1970s and were a key part of the band's multi-platinum success.

=== Punk rock in California ===
==== Los Angeles ====
Los Angeles' original late 1970s punk scene received less press attention than their counterparts in New York or London, but it included cult bands the Screamers, the Germs, the Weirdos, the Dils, the Bags, 45 Grave (founded by Paul B. Cutler), Nervous Gender, and X.

Other Los Angeles-area punk and hardcore groups of the era include Wasted Youth, T.S.O.L., L7, Los Illegals, the Plugz, Cruzados, the Brat, the Controllers, the Hollywood Squares, Super Heroines, the Pandoras, the Droogs, Catholic Discipline, the Mau-Mau's, VOM, Dr. Know (featuring former child star Brandon Cruz), Legal Weapon, Claw Hammer, the Mentors (originally from Seattle), along with future underground stars NOFX.

==== South Bay ====
In the Los Angeles South Bay, American hardcore punk was born with bands like Black Flag, Circle Jerks, Minutemen and Youth Brigade, who formed in the mid-1970s to early 1980s. SST Records was started by Greg Ginn of Black Flag in Long Beach in 1978. San Pedro, Hermosa Beach, Wilmington, Manhattan Beach, and Hawthorne spawned more locally famous acts like Red Cross (who would later incorporate garage rock, power pop, and glam influences into their sound and change their name to Redd Kross), the Last, Circle Jerks, Saint Vitus, the Descendents, and Saccharine Trust. The famous movie about the hardcore scene, The Decline of Western Civilization, was shot in this area, largely in an abandoned church in Hermosa called the Creative Craft Center. The movement fell out of popularity around the mid-1980s. The late 1980s/early 1990s saw a revival in the South Bay punk scene with punk bands like Bad Religion, Down by Law, NOFX, the Offspring, Pennywise, and Ten Foot Pole under the Epitaph Records label.

==== San Fernando Valley ====
Youth Brigade founded BYO Records in 1982 in Sun Valley. Also of note is the band Bad Religion, who hailed from the western San Fernando Valley and were only marginally associated with hardcore punk rock from the South Bay area. The punk scene in the eastern San Fernando Valley was closely tied in with that of nearby Hollywood and produced bands such as the Dickies, Fear, and the Angry Samoans. The bands Iconoclast and Public Nuisance also hailed from this area. Numerous punks shows in the 1980s, including shows by Circle Jerks and Black Flag, took place in a warehouse on the old site of Devonshire Downs in Northridge.

==== Orange County ====
In Orange County, the band Middle Class, from Santa Ana, was probably the most influential; their "Out of Vogue" is sometimes considered the first hardcore recording. The original hardcore bands in Orange County came from the Fullerton area, where the Adolescents, Agent Orange, Social Distortion, and D.I. formed. Social Distortion would later incorporate blues, country, and early rock influences into their sound and become one of America's premier roots rock bands. Farther south, Huntington Beach was also an influential center of hardcore, and is known as the origin of slam dancing, credited to Jimmy Trash the singer of The Crowd who created The Slam Dance at the Cuckoos Nest. Huntington band T.S.O.L. had a reputation for being aggressive and sometimes violent, while Uniform Choice became known as a prominent straight edge band from the West Coast, Love Canal from Huntington Beach was the complete opposite bringing a more humorous version of hardcore punk to the scene. Another Orange County band of note is the U.S. Bombs fronted by Duane Peters. True Sounds of Liberty (TSOL) was perhaps the most infamous for violence, and for an abrupt and unpopular change towards proto-Gothic rock and, much later, Aerosmith-style heavy metal as the scene developed; future underground stars the Vandals evolved from TSOL's eventual breakdown. Other Orange County bands included Channel 3 (CH3), the Offspring, Big Drill Car, Guttermouth, Suicidal Tendencies (who were from Venice but were associated with Orange County hardcore), China White and Shattered Faith.

The area had a big hand in the third wave ska scene with this region giving rise to Save Ferris, Reel Big Fish, and the scenes' most well-known act the Gwen Stefani-fronted No Doubt who would go on to pop super-stardom.

==== San Diego ====
The Zeros formed in Chula Vista in 1976. The Neutrons gained limited success, eventually changing their name to Battalion of Saints. The Donkey Show was a ska band that saw some notoriety during the late 1980s, helping to establish the genre known as third wave ska. The Dils were originally from Carlsbad, a San Diego suburb, later moving to San Francisco.

==== San Francisco ====
Outside of New York, London, Detroit, Cleveland, and Boston, San Francisco probably had the earliest punk scene, at least as far back as 1976. The scene was aided by San Francisco's famously laid back attitude towards alternative lifestyles, and the legendary record label Alternative Tentacles. Crime and the Nuns were first, followed by Chrome, the Mutants, the Units, the Contractions, Angst, the Sleepers, Pop-O-Pies, Frightwig, Crucifix, Negative Trend, the Avengers, Toiling Midgets, Flipper and Romeo Void. The most influential San Francisco hardcore band was Dead Kennedys, whose frontman, Jello Biafra, became a noted social activist. Many hardcore bands moved to San Francisco, including legends MDC, as well as D.R.I., Tales of Terror (from Sacramento, who made Kurt Cobain's Top 50 list of favorite bands and essential listening), the Dicks, and Rhythm Pigs (all from Texas).

==== Berkeley ====
Berkeley experienced a hardcore boom led by Fang. Berkeley also saw hardcore fusing with heavy metal to form thrash metal and bands like Possessed, Faith No More, Metallica, and Exodus.

Also in the mid-late 1980s hardcore, pop punk, and ska punk bands gained a following with bands such as Operation Ivy, Crimpshrine, The Mr. T Experience, the Lookouts, Isocracy, Green Day, Blatz, and Plaid Retina. These bands played at the infamous Gilman Street Project and released records on Lookout! Records.

==== San Jose ====
San Jose's most famous hardcore band was the Faction, who played with local bands such as Los Olvidados. It is also from where some members of Rancid hailed. Punk rock band No Use for a Name is also from San Jose. As the punk rock drought in San Jose left the area thirsty, 2005 spawned from its sewers the gutter punk outfit Medicated Motherfuckers. Quenching the thirst of those in the Bay Area with shameless intoxicated tales of debauchery.

=== Heavy metal ===
==== Glam metal ====
Glam metal arose along the Sunset Strip in Los Angeles in the 1980s with bands like Quiet Riot, Mötley Crüe, and later Pennsylvania immigrants Poison and quickly became known for anthemic hard rock and power ballads, as well as band members' distinctively feminine make-up, hair, and clothing in spite of the scene's macho posturing. This scene would die out in the 1990s due to grunge.

==== Thrash metal ====
The Bay Area thrash scene was centered around Los Angeles and San Francisco in the 1980s and 1990s. Bands associated with this scene include Metallica, Megadeth, Slayer, Exodus, Vio-lence, Suicidal Tendencies, Dark Angel, Death Angel, D.R.I., Testament, Forbidden, Defiance, and Evildead.

=== Alternative rock ===
Kim Gordon of Sonic Youth grew up in Los Angeles, where she attended Otis Art Institute, before moving to New York.

Wall of Voodoo multiple-drum-machine and Farfisa organ laden recordings with wild guitars and clever and desert wise road lyrics out of central Hollywood Boulevard and Selma Avenue wild life started the New wave trend in Southern California late 1970s early 1980s.

The Cretones added power pop guitar riffs and thoughtful lyrics with a touch of humor and sarcasm in the late 1970s early 1980s. They attracted the attention of Linda Ronstadt, who recorded three of their songs on her new wave album Mad Love, titled after the Cretones' song.

At the same time that gothic rock began in the United Kingdom, a parallel death rock scene evolved in Los Angeles out of the punk scene, with bands like 45 Grave and Christian Death.

Inspired by bands like the Gun Club and Ohio transplants the Cramps, cowpunk bands such as Tex & the Horseheads, and Blood on the Saddle arose from Los Angeles in the 1980s.

The Paisley Underground scene would arise out of Los Angeles in the mid-1980s around Redd Kross, The Three O'Clock (originally The Salvation Army), the Bangles, the Dream Syndicate, the Long Ryders, Rain Parade, Opal, Mazzy Star, and others.

Faith No More and Primus formed in San Francisco in the 1980s. Los Angeles' Red Hot Chili Peppers steadily built up media attention with their first recordings in the mid-to-late-1980s, and went on to become one of the world's premier rock bands in the following decade. Santa Cruz spawned Camper Van Beethoven in the mid-1980s. Jane's Addiction would arise out of Venice in the late 1980s.

=== Experimental ===
The Los Angeles Free Music Society was formed in 1973 and produced the group Smegma.

The Mystic Knights of the Oingo Boingo was an American surrealist street theatre troupe, formed by performer and director Richard Elfman in 1972. The group was led by Richard until 1976, when his brother Danny Elfman took over. The group evolved into an experimental musical theatre group, performing songs from the 1930s-40s and original material. In 1979, Danny Elfman wished to pursue a new direction as a dedicated rock band and the group reformed as Oingo Boingo. Several Mystic Knights band members continued with the new band including Steve Bartek, Leon Schneiderman, Dale Turner, and Sam 'Sluggo' Phipps.

Mr. Bungle is an experimental band formed in Eureka, California, in 1985. Having gone through many incarnations throughout their career, the band is best known for music created during their most experimental era. During this time, they developed a highly eclectic style, cycling through several musical genres, often within the course of a single song, including heavy metal, avant-garde jazz, ska, disco, and funk, which is further enhanced by lead vocalist Mike Patton's versatile singing style. This period also saw the band utilizing unconventional song structures and samples; playing a wide array of instruments; dressing up in masks, jumpsuits, and other costumes; and performing a diverse selection of cover songs during live performances.

=== Hip hop ===
During the 1980s, hip hop music flourished in Los Angeles and surrounding areas, especially Watts and Compton. Derived from New York City, hip hop drew upon primarily East Coast influences, though early 1970s black nationalist poets the Watts Prophets were also notable. The earliest forms of Los Angeles hip hop were hardcore hip hop artists like Ice-T (whose mid-80s "6 in the Mornin'" is arguably the first West Coast gangsta rap track). Among the most popular electro hop groups was the World Class Wrecking Cru, which included future star Dr. Dre, DJ Yela, and others and also featured singer Michel'le, an early pioneer in combining soulful R&B singing with hip-hop beats. In 1989, Dr. Dre, along with Eazy-E and Ice Cube, released Straight Outta Compton under the name N.W.A. The album took many hip hop fans by surprise, as it single-handedly placed West Coast hip hop on the map and quickly moved gangsta rap into the mainstream. The main gangsta rap and west coast hip hop cities were Long Beach, San Francisco, Oakland, Vallejo, Pittsburg, Sacramento, Richmond, East Palo Alto, Berkeley, Los Angeles, Bakersfield, Fresno, Compton, and Inglewood.

== 1990s and 2000s ==
=== Hip hop ===
Called "The Golden Age of Hip hop", the 1990s saw the rise of such legendary rappers as 2Pac, Cypress Hill, Dr. Dre, Eazy-E, Ice Cube, Kid Frost, Snoop Dogg, Yo-Yo.

In the 1990s Ice Cube released six albums and the first five albums all went platinum, and the last one, War & Peace, went gold. Cube became an icon for West Coast hip hop for his songs about social and political issues. In 1992, Dr. Dre's solo debut, The Chronic, made West Coast hip hop and Death Row Records the dominant sound in hip hop, drawing primarily upon George Clinton's P-Funk for samples and the general, slow, lazy funk, which G-funk music was founded in Los Angeles and Long Beach. Death Row Records soon acquired Tupac Shakur, Warren G and Snoop Doggy Dogg as a feud developed between the East and West Coasts. In the mid-90s, Shakur and his rival Notorious B.I.G. were both shot and killed. Death Row Records CEO Suge Knight was imprisoned, and most of the label's acts tried to leave. The lack of leadership helped put New York, Atlanta, and New Orleans on the top of the hip hop charts, leaving local would-be legends and underground MC's (emcees) to work under self-financed productions.

In the 1990s, underground hip hop flourished in the San Francisco Bay Area. Early pioneers included Too Short and E-40; their success helped pave the way for new performers like RBL Posse, whose 1992 "Don't Gimme No Bammer" achieved some crossover success. The Bay Area's thriving underground rap scene has produced literally hundreds of artists, some of the better known being Andre Nickatina, the Coup, Michael Franti, the Conscious Daughters, Paris, Blackalicious, Ya Boy, and San Quinn. The Bay Area is also home to the relatively new "Hyphy" subgenre. Mac Dre was one of the notable innovators. San Francisco was very impressive in hip hop, boasting west coast legends Rappin' 4-Tay, RBL Posse, Andre Nickatina, JT The Bigga Figga, Cougnut, and more. San Francisco and Oakland were some of the homes of the late global rapping legend Tupac Shakur. The inner-city of San Francisco's neighborhoods' crime inspired the rap scene of San Francisco.

Madlib and brother Oh No were born in Oxnard. Dilated Peoples, Jurassic 5, and Flying Lotus are from Los Angeles. The Alchemist is from Beverly Hills.

=== Indie rock ===
The early 1990s saw the emergence of Pavement, an influential indie rock band from Stockton. In the mid-1990s, Beck came out of the Silver Lake (a neighborhood in Los Angeles) indie rock scene. Queercore bands Tribe 8, Pansy Division, Cypher in the Snow, the Little Deaths, and Sta-Prest formed in San Francisco in the 1990s and recorded for local label Outpunk among others. San Francisco also produced the Trashwomen and Fabulous Disaster. Los Angeles and southern California also produced Longstocking, Best Revenge, Red Aunts, Quetzal, the Muffs, and Emily's Sassy Lime in the 1990s.

The 2000s brought the emergence of Ariel Pink, Black Rebel Motorcycle Club, Or, the Whale, the Aislers Set, the Botticellis, Scissors for Lefty, Deerhoof, Icebird, The Dodos, the Quails, the Curtains, I the Mighty, La Plebe, Erase Errata, the Phantom Limbs, the Donnas, Hunx and His Punx, Shannon and the Clams, Sic Alps, and the Union Trade from the San Francisco Bay Area and the Quarter After, Scarling., Best Coast, Warpaint, Autolux, Two Tears, Giant Drag, Brian Jonestown Massacre, HEALTH, Fool's Gold, No Age, Foot Village, the Warlocks, Silver Daggers, Tearist, Mika Miko, and Ty Segall from Los Angeles. She Wants Revenge formed in the San Fernando Valley. Groups from San Diego include the Album Leaf, Three Mile Pilot, Pinback, Thingy, the Soft Pack, and the Black Heart Procession.

=== Hardcore punk and metalcore ===
The early-to-mid 1990s would see the birth of several bands in the San Diego, California music scene, some of which would lead a post-hardcore movement associated with the independent label Gravity Records. This movement would eventually become known as the "San Diego sound". Gravity was founded in 1991 by Matt Anderson, member of the band Heroin, as a means to release the music of his band and of other related San Diego groups, which also included Antioch Arrow and Clikatat Ikatowi. The label's earlier releases are known for the definition of "a new sound in hardcore rooted in tradition but boasting a chaotic sound that showcased a new approach" to the genre. Heroin were known for being innovators of early 1990s hardcore and for making dynamic landscapes "out of one minute blasts of noisy vitriol". These bands were influenced by acts like Fugazi and The Nation of Ulysses, while also helping propagate an offshoot of hardcore that "grafted spastic intensity to willfully experimental dissonance and dynamics". This movement has been associated to the development of the subgenre of screamo, while it also should be noticed that this term has been, as with the case of emo, the subject of controversy. The label also featured releases by non-San Diego bands that included Mohinder (from Cupertino, California), Angel Hair and its subsequent related project The VSS (from Boulder, Colorado), groups that have also been associated with this sound. The VSS was known for their use of synthesizers "vying with post-hardcore's rabid atonality".

Outside the Gravity roster, another band that played an important role in the development of the "San Diego sound" was Drive Like Jehu. This group, founded by former members of Pitchfork, was known, according to Steve Huey, for their lengthy and multisectioned compositions based on the innovations brought by the releases on Dischord, incorporating elements such as "odd time signatures played an important role on its development in spite of the band's music not resembling the sound such term would later signify. In a similar manner, Swing Kids, composed of former members of hardcore bands from the San Diego scene such as Unbroken, Struggle and Spanakorzo, have been described by journalist Zach Baron as the moment in which the "hardcore" sound of bands like Unbroken effectively became "post-hardcore", known for "covering Joy Division songs" and for its sonic "jazz-quoting" and "guitar feedback" experimentation features. They were also one of the first bands released under the independent label Three One G, founded by the band's vocalist Justin Pearson and later known for releasing the works of several other post-hardcore, noise rock, mathcore and grindcore groups.

As metalcore became the popular subgenre of hardcore in the late 1990s to early 2000s, bands such as Avenged Sevenfold, As I Lay Dying, Atreyu, Confide, Dayseeker, Deadseraphim, Death By Stereo, Bleeding Through, Eighteen Visions, In Fear and Faith, In This Moment, Of Mice & Men, Phinehas, Stick to Your Guns, and Throwdown made their mark in Southern California. A Skylit Drive and Jamie's Elsewhere made their mark in Northern California.

Highly influential Post-hardcore luminaries, Drive Like Jehu (and the subsequent band, Hot Snakes) hail from San Diego. Rocket from the Crypt gained notoriety in the 1990s with vocalist and taste-maker John Reis' Swami Records and Swami Sound System radio show being very influential in the area. Hardcore bands Unbroken, Swing Kids, Some Girls, and Over My Dead Body also formed in San Diego during this period.

=== Pop Rock ===
New Radicals, known for their hit "You Get What you Give", were formed out of Los Angeles.

=== Pop punk ===
Pop punk band Blink-182 formed in Poway. Lit formed in Orange County. Eve 6 formed in La Crescenta-Montrose.

=== Alternative rock ===
California has produced many of the most genre-defying music artists/bands. Alternative rock is one of the more broadly defined music genres, more inclusive than others. These are some of the most popular Alternative rock bands from California (in alphanumeric order), Audioslave, Bad Religion, Beck*, Counting Crows, Green Day*, Hole, Jane's Addiction, No Doubt, Rage Against the Machine, Red Hot Chili Peppers, Social Distortion, Stone Temple Pilots, Sublime, Tom Waits*, Weezer (*Grammy winners for Best Alternative Music Album).

=== Desert rock ===
Desert Rock was formed by a group of closely related bands and musicians from Palm Desert in Southern California, including San Bernardino, Redlands, Palm Springs, and Indio. Their hard rock sound – which was often described as desert rock – contains elements of psychedelia, blues, heavy metal and other genres, such as hardcore, as well as distinctive repetitive drum beats; typically performed with electric guitar, bass guitar, and a drum kit. The musicians often play in multiple bands simultaneously, and there is a high rate of collaboration between bands. The Palm Desert Scene is also notable for producing stoner rock pioneers Kyuss. The term "stoner rock" is sometimes used interchangeably with "desert rock." However, not all Desert Rock bands are "stoner rock." Notable Desert Rock style acts include Queens of the Stone Age, Kyuss, Sleep, Truckfighters, Eagles of Death Metal, Fatso Jetson, and Fu Manchu.

=== Nu metal and alternative metal ===
California was at the forefront for the emergence of these two genres in the 1990s with nu metal bands such as Korn, Linkin Park, Papa Roach and P.O.D all coming from California along with alternative metal bands such as A Perfect Circle, Audioslave, Deftones, Faith No More, Jane's Addiction, Rage Against the Machine, System of a Down, and Tool.

=== Christian Rock ===
Southern California saw the rise of Christian hardcore, specifically Spirit-filled hardcore (SFHXC) during the mid-90s including No Innocent Victim, and Unashamed. Jason Dunn of No Innocent Victim started Facedown Records. Switchfoot is a Christian Alternative band based out of San Diego.

=== Experimental ===
The Smell, opened in 1998, is an all-ages, punk rock/noise/experimental venue in downtown Los Angeles, home to many of the area's avant-garde performers and artists.

Grouper (Liz Harris) was born in Northern California and grew up around the San Francisco Bay area and in Oregon where she is now based. Holly Herndon, born in Tennessee, is based in San Francisco. Herndon studied electronic music at Mills College in Oakland.

== 2010s ==
=== Hip hop ===
Experimental hip hop acts Death Grips from Sacramento and clipping. from L.A. formed in 2010.

Kendrick Lamar, from Compton, had his major-label debut and breakout in 2012 with Good Kid, M.A.A.D City. To Pimp a Butterfly followed in 2015 to further acclaim. Lamar won the 2018 Pulitzer Prize for Music for his 2017 album Damn. He also won in 2025 5 Grammy Awards for his work on the Drake diss track "Not Like Us", including Record of the Year and Song of the Year; the most-decorated song in Grammy history.

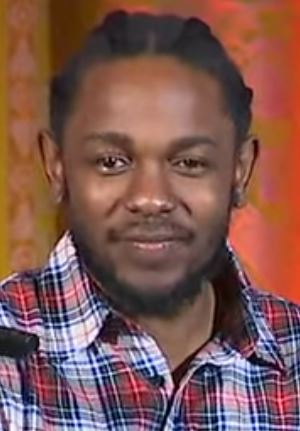
Kendrick Lamar in 2016.

Hawthorne rapper Tyler, the Creator is best known for his soulful style in hip-hop music, following his horrorcore aesthetics in his first two albums, Bastard (2009) and Goblin (2011). He formed in the late 2000s the hip-hop collective Odd Future, alongside Long Beach R&B singer Frank Ocean and other members such as siblings Syd and Travis "Taco" Bennett, Casey Veggies and Earl Sweatshirt. His third album, Wolf (2013), was a departure to his initial horrorcore style. His fourth album, Cherry Bomb (2015), included guest performances from popular hip-hop artists such as Kanye West and Lil Wayne. His fifth album, Flower Boy (2017), was his first Grammy Award nomination for Best Rap Album in 2018, but lost to Damn by Kendrick Lamar. His subsequent albums, Igor (2019) and Call Me If You Get Lost (2021), won the award in 2020 and in 2022.

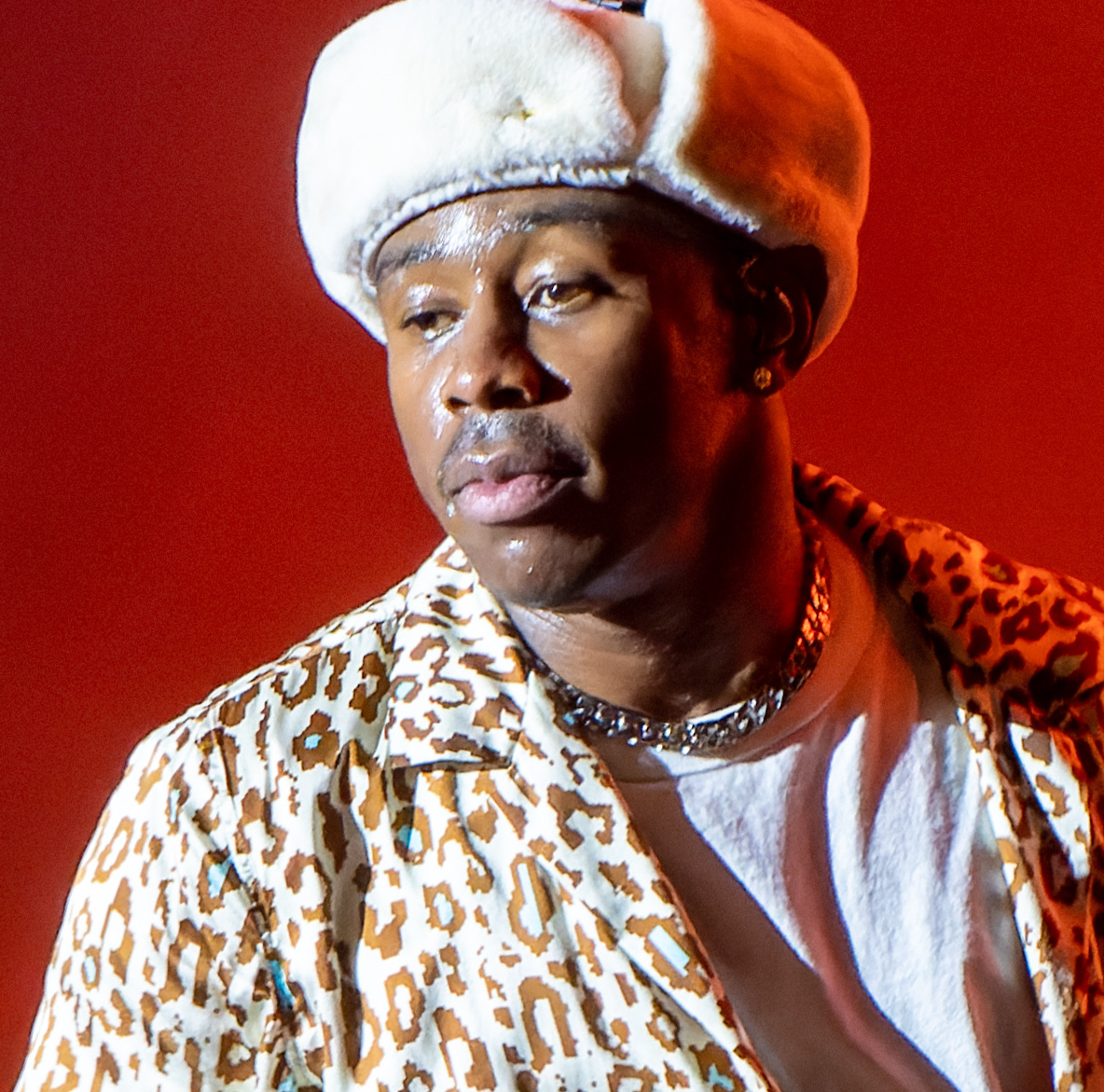
Tyler, the Creator performing in 2022

=== Rock ===
Los Angeles band Haim garnered much success on both sides of the Atlantic upon the release of their debut album Days Are Gone in 2013. Gemini Syndrome are also based out of Los Angeles and formed in 2010. Being as an Ocean based out of Alpine were formed in 2011.

== Jazz in California ==
Influential jazz musicians from California include Dave Brubeck, Vince Guaraldi, Jimmy Giuffre, Carla Bley, and Cal Tjader, while vocal jazz legends Etta James, Jo Stafford, and Ivie Anderson were also Californians. Other California jazz musicians include Larry Bunker, Buddy Collette, Eric Dolphy, Dexter Gordon, Chico Hamilton, Charles Mingus, Britt Woodman, Teddy Edwards, Vi Redd, Leroy Vinnegar, Gerald Wilson, Hampton Hawes, Billy Higgins, Mary Stallings, Butch Morris, David Murray, Joanne Brackeen, Gretchen Parlato, Bobby Hutcherson, Willie Jones III, Joshua Redman, Kamasi Washington, and Yellowjackets.

Los Angeles' Central Avenue is a historically significant place for jazz.

A revival of swing and big band music was led by Big Bad Voodoo Daddy in the 1990s.

== Classical music in California ==
California has a number of established orchestras, including the San Francisco Symphony (1911), Los Angeles Philharmonic Association (1919), San Diego Symphony (1910), Fremont Symphony Orchestra, Oakland East Bay Symphony (formed in 1988 by combining two older organizations), Coachella Valley Symphony, Peninsula Symphony Orchestra (1949), and the Fresno Philharmonic Association (1954).

20th century avant garde composer John Cage was born in Los Angeles. Lou Harrison, a contemporary and sometimes collaborator of Cage's, grew up around San Francisco, where he met William Colvig in 1967, with whom he helped develop American gamelan. Composer Jody Diamond, of Pasadena, founded the American Gamelan Institute in Berkeley in 1981. Other notable composers from California include David Cope, Henry Cowell, Harry Partch, Terry Riley, Terry Jennings, and Harold Budd. See: West Coast school.

Russian-born composer Igor Stravinsky lived in Los Angeles from the 1940s-1960s.

== Music festivals and organizations ==
California hosts many well-known music festivals in a wide variety of fields, including the Stern Grove Festival, the Hootenanny at Irvine Park, Coachella Valley Music and Arts Festival, Harmony Sweepstakes A Cappella Festival, High Sierra Music Festival, BottleRock Napa Valley and Facedown Fest. There are multiple jazz festivals including the Monterey Jazz Festival (one of the oldest jazz festivals in the world), the San Jose Jazz Festival, the San Francisco Jazz Festival, and the Playboy Jazz Festival in Los Angeles. The Monterey Pop Festival, held in 1967, is perhaps the most famous concert in California's history; the show launched the international careers of performers like Jimi Hendrix, the Who, Otis Redding, and Janis Joplin.

Music organizations in the state include the Community Arts Music Association. There is also an organization that gives out California Music Awards.

== Sources ==
- Blush, Steven (2001). American Hardcore: A Tribal History. Feral House. ISBN 0-922915-71-7
- Nettl, Bruno (1965). Folk and Traditional Music of the Western Continents. Inglewood, New Jersey: Prentice Hall.
