= Dead Cross =

American crossover thrash band

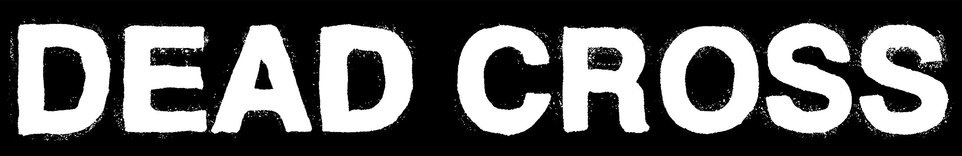

Background information
- Genres: Crossover thrash; hardcore punk; thrash metal
- Years active: 2015–present
- Labels: Ipecac; Three One G
- Members: Michael Crain; Justin Pearson; Dave Lombardo; Mike Patton
- Past members: Gabe Serbian

Dead Cross is an American crossover thrash supergroup formed in Southern California. The band consists of guitarist Michael Crain (Retox), bassist Justin Pearson (the Locust, Head Wound City and Retox), drummer Dave Lombardo (Slayer, Mr. Bungle and Fantômas) and vocalist Mike Patton (Faith No More, Mr. Bungle and Fantômas).

== History ==
Pearson and Lombardo had previously worked with producer Ross Robinson individually. Robinson later asked Pearson to play on a demo as a session bassist. Pearson later found out that Lombardo was also playing on the demo; Crain also took part in these sessions. Lombardo noted that he had to fill some tour dates and was lacking a band, so Lombardo, Pearson and Crain formed a live band in about 12 days; this project became Dead Cross. Dead Cross was officially formed on November 30, 2015 by Crain, Pearson, Lombardo and vocalist Gabe Serbian (the Locust, Head Wound City and ex-Retox). The band made their live debut that December.

On March 8, 2016, they streamed the song "We'll Sleep When They're Dead". In 2016, Serbian left the group after recording vocals for the band, however the group chose not to release the record with Serbian's vocals. That December, the band announced that Patton would be the new vocalist. With the music for their debut album already recorded, Patton recorded the vocals separately. However Patton wrote his own lyrics for the album. The album, produced by Ross Robinson, was released jointly by Patton's Ipecac Recordings and Pearson's Three One G labels on August 4, 2017.

On May 22, 2017, Dead Cross announced their first tour, to start on August 10.

On August 15, 2017, all four members of the band were arrested in Houston, Texas. On advice of their legal counsel, the band made no public comment on the situation.

On May 2, 2018, Dead Cross released a self-titled EP containing two new songs and two remixes from their previous album.

During December 2019, Dead Cross was recording material for a new album. In June 2020, they covered "Rise Above" from Black Flag. On December 23, 2020, a music video was released for the song "Skin Of A Redneck". Posts from the band’s social media accounts have hinted at an upcoming album.

On July 19, 2022, the release of the second album, titled II was announced. It was released on the 29th of October on CD, LP and tape formats. On the same day a video for the leading title Reign of Errors has been released through the Ipecac official YouTube channel. In December 2022, the Rolling Stone included the album's lead single Reign of Error in its The 100 Best Songs of 2022 list, at the 92nd place.

== Musical style ==
While the band refer to themselves as a hardcore punk band, in the media they have instead been recognized more as a metal band, particularly in the thrash metal genre. When talking about the debut album, vocalist Patton insisted, "To me, it is a traditional hardcore record. It is very pointed, direct and visceral. Like, I wasn't going to play keyboards, add samples or any kind of orchestration. It was like, 'Yo, just go for it.' In some ways, it reminded me of stuff that we had collectively all grown up with and loved when we were like teenagers — bands like the Accüsed, Deep Wound or Siege, stuff that was just brutal, uncompromising and right to the point".

== Members ==
Current

- Michael Crain – guitar (2015–present)
- Justin Pearson – bass (2015–present)
- Dave Lombardo – drums (2015–present)
- Mike Patton – vocals (2016–present)

Former

- Gabe Serbian – vocals (2015–2016; died 2022)

== Discography ==
=== Studio albums ===
- Dead Cross (2017, Ipecac, Three One G)
- II (2022, Ipecac, Three One G)

=== EPs ===
- Dead Cross (2018, Ipecac)

=== Singles ===
- Rise Above (2020)

=== Music videos ===
Year	Title	Director
2017	"Seizure and Desist"	Eric Livingston
2017	"Obedience School"	Dennis Bersales
2017	"Church of the Motherfuckers"	Michael Panduro
2018	“My Perfect Prisoner”	Eric Livingston
2020	”Rise Above”	Displaced/Replaced
2020	"Skin Of A Redneck"	Kay Otto
2022	"Reign Of Error"	Displaced/Replaced
2022	"Heart Reformer"	Dark Details
2022	"Christian Missile Crisis"	Displaced/Replaced
