= Head Wound City (EP) =

EP by Head Wound City
- Released: November 8, 2005
- Genre: Grindcore, noise rock, mathcore
- Length: 9:42
- Label: Three One G

Head Wound City chronology
| Head Wound City (2005) | A New Wave of Violence (2016) |

Head Wound City is the debut self-titled EP by the hardcore punk supergroup Head Wound City. It was released in 2005.

Musically it is very similar to Jordan Blilie's work with The Blood Brothers, combined with styles similar to The Locust (which includes members Justin Pearson and Gabe Serbian).

It was reissued in March 2015.

== Track listing ==
1. Radical Friends – 1:41
2. I'm a Taxidermist – I'll Stuff Anything – 1:01
3. Prick Class – 1:29
4. Street College – 0:57
5. New Soak for an Empty Pocket – 1:18
6. Thrash Zoo – 0:53
7. Michael J. Fux Featuring Gnarls in Charge – 2:23
