= Dead Cross (album) =

Studio album by Dead Cross
- Released: August 4, 2017
- Genre: Crossover thrash, experimental metal
- Length: 27:33
- Label: Ipecac, Three One G
- Producer: Ross Robinson

Dead Cross chronology
Dead Cross (2017)	II (2022)

Dead Cross is the debut self-titled studio album by American thrash metal/crossover band Dead Cross. It was released in August 2017 under Ipecac Recordings.

Professional ratings
Aggregate scores
Source	Rating
AnyDecentMusic?	7.4/10
Metacritic	76/100
Review scores
Source	Rating
Distorted Sound	8/10 stars
The Guardian	5/5 stars
Exclaim!	9/10
AllMusic	4/5 stars

== Tracklist ==
No.	Title	Length
1.	"Seizure and Desist"	2:38
2.	"Idiopathic"	2:43
3.	"Obedience School"	2:50
4.	"Shillelagh"	2:32
5.	"Bela Lugosi's Dead" (Bauhaus cover)	2:34
6.	"Divine Filth"	2:20
7.	"Grave Slave"	1:59
8.	"The Future Has Been Cancelled"	2:17
9.	"Gag Reflex"	4:21
10.	"Church of the Motherfuckers"	3:24

== Personnel ==
Musicians

- Michael Crain – guitar, backing vocals
- Justin Pearson – bass, backing vocals
- Dave Lombardo – drums, backing vocals (track 7)
- Mike Patton – vocals
- Gabe Serbian – vocals (track 2)

Production

- Mike Balboa – mixing
- John Golden – mastering
- Dead Cross – production
- Ross Robinson – production, recording
- Mike Patton – recording
- Eric Alan Livingston – original artwork
- Brandon McMinn – layout, design

== Charts ==
Chart	Peak position
US Billboard 200	180
US Top Hard Rock Albums (Billboard)	12
US Heatseekers Albums (Billboard)	2
US Top Rock Albums (Billboard)	39
US Vinyl Albums (Billboard)	7
Belgian Albums (Ultratop Flanders)	135
Dutch Albums (Album Top 100)	156
Belgian Albums (Ultratop Wallonia)	120
