= Swing Kids (band) =

American post-hardcore band (1994-1997)

- Also known as: Blue Note (2011 reunion)
- Origin: San Diego, California
- Genres: Post-hardcore; screamo; sass
- Years active: 1994–1997; 1998; 2009; 2011; 2025–present
- Label: Three One G
- Spinoffs: The Locust, Some Girls, The Album Leaf, The Crimson Curse
- Spinoff of: Unbroken, Struggle
- Members: Justin Pearson; Nathan Joyner; John Brady; Jose Palafox; Jimmy LaValle
- Past members: Eric Allen; Michelle Maskovich

Swing Kids is a screamo band from San Diego, California, during the mid-1990s. They were foundational to the San Diego hardcore punk scene of the 1990s. The two EPs they released during their initial run were some of the very first records to be put out by Three One G.

== History ==
Swing Kids formed in 1994 shortly after the breakup of hardcore punk band Struggle. Justin Pearson chose to take up vocals while Jose and Eric remained on drums and guitar respectively. Michelle Maskovich initially offered to play bass, but immediately left and was replaced with John Brady.

Swing Kids released a self-titled 7-inch EP which features four original tracks as well as a harsh version of Joy Division’s "Warsaw". From that EP, the song "Blue Note" was listed by Vulture.com as number 83 of the 100 greatest emo songs. Soon after the band released their EP they followed up with a split 10-inch EP with Spanakorzo, which shared band member John Brady.

After a few short tours and a jaunt over to Europe, the band called it quits due to drummer Jose Palafox relocating to the Bay Area. Swing Kids managed to track one last song, "El Camino Car Crash," which is the additional track on the digital follow up of the band's entire collection, simply titled Discography. Over the years, this nine-song collection would become a staple for the Three One G community.

The band did their few last shows recruiting Jimmy Lavalle to play second guitar.

Guitarist and founding member of Swing Kids and Unbroken Eric Allen took his own life in 1998. The remaining members had the opportunity to play two benefit shows in Southern California raising thousands of dollars for charity. The shows or "funerals", as the band members looked at it, displayed that the band's spirit will live on, and showcased the evolution of the remaining members' musicianship.

The documentation of these shows was a self-titled 7-inch single featuring an updated version of "Situation on Mars" as well as a new track titled, "Fake Teeth".

In 2011, Justin Pearson, Jose Palafox, Jimmy LaVelle and John Brady, accompanied by Nathan Joyner, briefly reunited under the name Blue Note, for a short tour of Europe.

Swing Kids reunited March 30, 2025 at The Casbah in San Diego, CA on day two of Grey, Dry and G’old - A Mini Transfronterizo Fest alongside Negative Blast, Agonista (John Brady’s current band), Prisoner, Fractal, Death Blows To Empire, and Nanobel.

== Legacy ==
Swing Kids carried the San Diego "art hardcore" movement past the initial wave of Gravity Records bands and through to the late 1990s, releasing a 7-inch EP and split 10-inch EP along the way. Despite their importance in a relatively small scene, Swing Kids' impact both during their tenure and after their 1997 breakup was global, thanks to multiple independent Zines and a US/European tour. The sound they pioneered inspired bands such as the Plot to Blow Up the Eiffel Tower, Refused, Orchid, Jeromes Dream and others.

Swing Kids are also credited with the unintentional creation of the fad "Spock Rock" during the mid-1990s, largely due to a number of their fans emulating Pearson's fashion sense and hair style, which itself was significantly influenced by Ian Svenonius and his band, the Nation of Ulysses. The name comes from Leonard Nimoy's character from the Star Trek television series and films, and more specifically his haircut. The band disliked the term "Spock rock".

Jose Palafox went on to play in bands such as Tit Wrench, Bread and Circuits, Yaphet Kotto, and Baader Brains. Bassist John Brady went on to play in Chicago's Sweep the Leg Johnny and Tijuana/San Diego’s Agonista. Vocalist Justin Pearson went on to play in acts such as The Locust, Retox, All Leather, Some Girls, Holy Molar, Crimson Curse, Head Wound City, and Ground Unicorn Horn.

== Members ==
Current members

- Justin Pearson – vocals (1994–1997, 1998, 2009, 2011, 2025–present)
- John Brady – bass (1994–1997, 1998, 2009, 2011, 2025–present)
- Jose Palafox – drums (1994–1997, 1998, 2009, 2011, 2025–present)
- Jimmy LaValle – guitar (1997, 1998, 2009, 2011, 2025–present)
- Nathan Joyner – guitar (2011 touring, 2025–present)

Touring members

- Ryan Ebaugh – saxophone (2025)

Former members

- Michelle Maskovich – bass (1994)
- Eric Allen – guitar (1994–1997; died 1998)

== Discography ==
Compilation albums

Title	Album details
Discography	Released: 1997; Label: Three One G; Formats: CD, Picture Disc LP
Anthology	Released: 2020; Label: Three One G; Formats: LP

Singles and EPs

Title	Single/EP details
Swing Kids	Released: 1994; Label: Kidney Room; Formats: 7"
Swing Kids/Spanakorzo	Released: 1995; Label: Three One G; Formats: 10"
"Situations On Mars" / "Fake Teeth"	Released: 2011; Label: Three One G, Vinyl Mama Records; Formats: 7"

Other appearances

Year	Song	Album
1994	"Disease"	A Food Not Bombs Benefit LP
1998	"El Camino Car Crash"	Bottlenekk Wholesale Distribution Sampler No. 1 - Fall 1998
2003	"Disease"	Queencrust Versus Kiss the Goat
2007	"El Camino Car Crash"	Three One G 2007
