= It's in His Kiss (disambiguation) =

"The Shoop Shoop Song (It's in His Kiss)" is a song recorded by various artists.

It's in His Kiss may also refer to:

- It's in His Kiss, a 2005 novel by Julia Quinn in the Bridgerton novel series
- It's in His Kiss, a 2008 novella by P. C. Cast
- It's in His Kiss, a 2014 novel by Jill Shalvis
- "It's in His Kiss", a song by The Plot to Blow Up the Eiffel Tower from the 2003 album Dissertation, Honey
