= Retox (band) =

American hardcore band

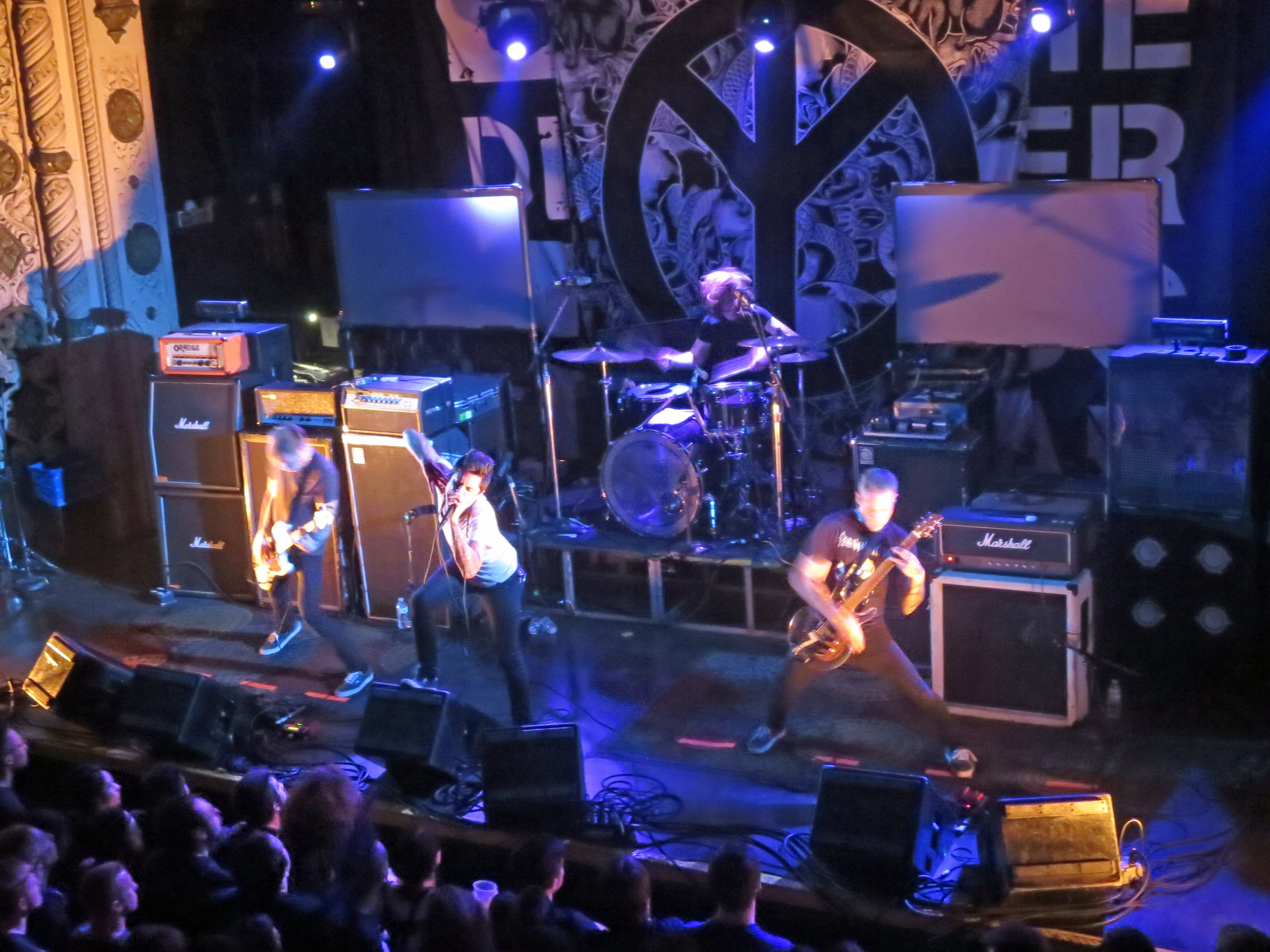
- Retox performing live in Chicago during their 2014 tour with The Dillinger Escape Plan

Background information
- Origin: San Diego, California, US
- Genres: Hardcore punk
- Years active: 2011–2020
- Labels: Ipecac; Epitaph
- Past members: Justin Pearson; Michael Crain; Gabe Serbian; Brian Evans; Kevin Avery; Thor Dickey; Keith Hendriksen; Ryan Bergmann
- Website: threeoneg.com/artists/retox

Retox was an American hardcore punk band that formed in 2011. The four-piece was founded by Justin Pearson and Gabe Serbian, both of whom had previously performed together in The Locust, Holy Molar and Head Wound City. The two additional members are Thor Dickey and Michael Crain. Serbian was replaced by Brian Evans in 2013. Retox has since been signed to Ipecac Recordings and Epitaph Records and released three studio albums: Ugly Animals (2011), YPLL (2013) and Beneath California (2015).

== History ==
=== Formation and Ugly Animals (2011) ===
Retox formed in 2011, originally out of founding members Justin Pearson's and Gabe Serbian's disappointment that their previous band Head Wound City was too short-lived and wanted to rehash that sound, though this sound evolved over time and with the addition of Thor Dickey and Michael Crain. The band released a self-titled EP and their debut album Ugly Animals that year through Ipecac Recordings, a California-based record label co-founded by Mike Patton and Greg Werckman. Ugly Animals was self-funded by the band members and recorded on analog tape to capture the aesthetic of the band that could not be captured digitally, a decision made by engineer Manny Nieto.

=== YPLL (2012–2013) ===
In 2013, Retox announced that they signed to Brett Gurewitz's Epitaph Records for their second studio album. Pearson previously worked with Epitaph to release two releases from The Locust and Heaven's Pregnant Teens in 2006 from his former band Some Girls. Retox released YPLL through the label on May 7, 2013. Prior to the release of the album, founding drummer Serbian left and was replaced by Brian Evans. For YPLL, Retox focused more on simpler song structures and guitar riffs, and featured a guest appearance from Nick Zinner on the track "Congratulations, You Are Good Enough".

=== Beneath California (2014–2020) ===
The band closed out 2014 with a split EP with Narrows. The EP was released through Pearson's own Three One G label and featured two tracks: the exclusive song "Fascination Street" and "This Should Hurt a Little Bit", which would appear on the band's following studio album. Retox released its third studio album titled Beneath California on February 10, 2015, again through Epitaph. In support of Beneath California, Retox toured North America February–March 2015 with Whores.

== Members ==
=== Current ===
- Justin Pearson – vocals (2011–2020)
- Michael Crain – guitar (2011–2020)
- Ryan Bergmann – bass (2015–2020)
- Kevin Avery - drums (2017–2020)

=== Former ===
- Gabe Serbian – drums (2011, died 2022)
- Brian Evans – drums (2011–2016)
- Thor Dickey – bass (2011–?)
- Keith Hendriksen – bass (?–2015)

== Discography ==
=== Studio albums ===
| Year | Album details |
|---|---|
| 2011 | Ugly Animals: Released: 2011; Label: Ipecac |
| 2013 | YPLL: Released: May 24, 2013; Label: Epitaph |
| 2015 | Beneath California: Released: February 6, 2015; Label: Epitaph |

=== EPs and splits ===
| Year | Album details |
|---|---|
| 2011 | Retox: Released: 2011; Label: Ipecac |
| 2014 | Narrows / Retox (split with Narrows): Released: 2014; Label: Three One G |

=== Music videos ===
- "A Bastard on Father's Day" (2011)
- "Biological Process of Politics" (2013)
- "Let's Not Keep in Touch" (2015)
- "Without Money, We'd All Be Rich" (2015)
- "Die in Your Own Cathedral" (2015)
