= Michael Crain =

American singer-songwriter

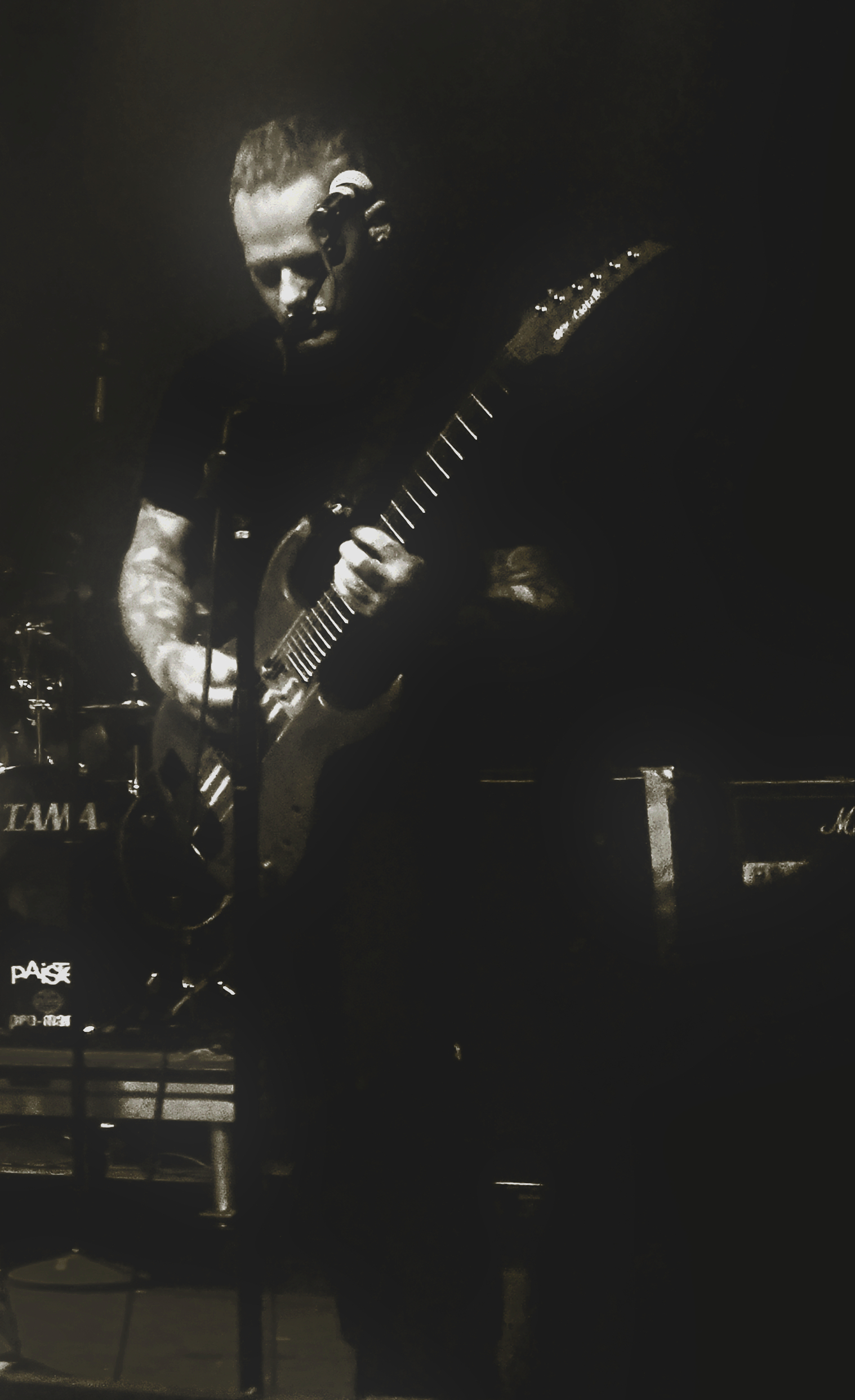
- Michael Crain with Dead Cross

Background information
- Born: Michael Jason Crain; February 22, 1974 (age 51); Cadillac, Michigan, United States
- Genres: Hardcore punk, punk, post-punk, metal, power violence
- Occupations: Guitarist, singer, songwriter, producer
- Instruments: Guitar - Gibson SG, Esoterik DR1, Gibson ES-335, Martin acoustic guitars, Bogner Amplification, Dunlop USA, and MXR effects pedals.
- Years active: 1994–present
- Labels: Ipecac Recordings, Epitaph, Three One G

Michael Jason Crain (born February 22, 1974) is an American guitarist, singer, producer, and songwriter best known as the guitarist of the bands Kill the Capulets, Retox, and Dead Cross. He has collaborated with Justin Pearson, Ryan Bergmann, Kevin Avery, Dave Lombardo, and Mike Patton among many others.

== Early life ==
When Michael was 6 years old, he became fascinated with Kiss and their distinctive makeup and appearance. He began performing for his family, pretending to sing and play guitar. His father, a longtime drummer, bought Michael his first electric guitar once he turned 18. His father also introduced him to rock bands such as Steely Dan, Led Zeppelin, The Beatles, Robin Trower, and Jimi Hendrix. Michael was especially inspired by Van Halen's guitarist Edward Van Halen.

Michael's mother--a fan of soul, R&B, Motown, and disco--also influenced his music taste. She listened to artists such as Stevie Wonder, Michael Jackson, Sade, Earth, Wind & Fire, Diana Ross, Smokey Robinson, The Temptations, and several other Motown acts.

By age 15, Michael had been exposed to heavy metal, thrash metal, and punk rock and became obsessed with bands such as Slayer, Metallica, DRI, MOD, SOD, Iron Maiden, Black Flag, Death, Suicidal Tendencies, Exodus, and Sex Pistols. He formed a band, After School Special.

== Music career ==
=== The Festival of Dead Deer ===
The Festival of Dead Deer is a post-punk band founded in 1997 in Los Angeles, CA. The current members are Michael Crain, Chris Hathwell (of Moving Units), and Dylan Gordon.

In 1996, they released their debut single titled The Festival of Dead Deer. This was followed by the 1999 release The Festival of Dead Deer/The Crimson Curse, produced by the independent label Three One G, founded by Justin Pearson. They also contributed to the compilation The Many Faces of Mental Illness (A Collection), released in 1998 by the Three One G label.

=== Kill the Capulets ===
Kill the Capulets is a post-punk band founded in 2009 in Los Angeles, California. The members are Michael Crain (vocalist and guitarist), Erick Anguiano, Keith Hendriksen, and Rockey Crane. In 2014, they released the album The Stranger, which was produced by the Three One G label.

=== Retox ===
Retox emerged in Southern California, specifically in San Diego and Los Angeles, in late 2010. The band's music has been described as punk, post-punk, hardcore, metal, and power violence, and its lyrics are known for their political disdain, horror themes, and sarcasm. The lineup includes Justin Pearson (of The Locust, Dead Cross, and Head Wound City), Michael Crain (Dead Cross, Festival of Dead Deer), Ryan Bergmann, and Kevin Avery (Planet B).

=== Dead Cross ===
Formed in Southern California in November 2015, Dead Cross is a band known for its frantic mix of hardcore and punk. The band's lineup includes drummer Dave Lombardo (Slayer, Suicidal Tendencies), guitarist Michael Crain (Retox), bassist Justin Pearson (Retox), and vocalist Mike Patton (Faith No More, Fantômas).

Their self-titled album, Dead Cross, was produced by Ross Robinson and released in 2017 through Mike Patton’s label Ipecac Recordings and Three One G.

== Discography ==
=== The Festival of the Dead Deer ===
The Festival of the Dead Deer (1996)

- Label: Blackbean and Placenta Tape Club
- Format: Vinyl 7”, 33 ⅓ RPM, White Label
- Style: Hardcore, Emo

The Many Faces of Mental Illness (A Collection) (1998)

- Label: Three One G
- Format: Vinyl LP, Compilation, Limited Edition, Clear with Red Spot
- Style: Hardcore

The Festival of the Dead Deer / The Crimson Curse (1999)

- Label: Three One G

=== Kill the Capulets ===
Various Artists – KXLU 88.9FM Live Vol. II (1997)

- Label: KXLU 12
- Format: Link to purchase or details

The Stranger (2014)

- Label: Three One G
- Format: Link to album

=== Retox ===
Ugly Animals (2011)

- Label: Ipecac Recordings, Three One G

YPLL (2013)

- Label: Epitaph, Three One G

Beneath California (2015)

- Label: Epitaph, Three One G

Retox (2011)

- Label: Three One G

Violitionist Sessions (2012)

- Label: Violitionist Sessions

NRWS/Retox (2014)

- Label: Three One G

NRWS/Retox (2015)

- Label: French Kiss Label Group
- Format: Vinyl 7”

=== Dead Cross ===
Dead Cross II (2022)

- Label: Ipecac Recordings, Three One G

Dead Cross (2017)

- Label: Ipecac Recordings, Three One G

Singles & EPs

- Dead Cross (2018)
  - Label: Ipecac Recordings
- EP (2020)
  - Website: Mike Crain's Bandcamp
- Single & EP (2021)
  - Website: Radical Guy Inc
