= Love in the Fascist Brothel =

Studio album by The Plot to Blow Up the Eiffel Tower
- Released: February 15, 2005
- Recorded: July – August 2004
- Genres: Noise rock, jazz punk, post-hardcore
- Length: 23:59
- Labels: Revelation Records (CD), Three One G (LP)
- Producers: Rafter Roberts, The Plot To Blow Up The Eiffel Tower

The Plot to Blow Up the Eiffel Tower chronology
| Dissertation, Honey (2003) | Love in the Fascist Brothel (2005) | INRI (2006) |

Professional ratings
Review scores
| Source | Rating |
|---|---|
| Pitchfork Media | 7.5/10 stars |
| Punknews.org | 2.5/5 stars |

Love in the Fascist Brothel is the second and final studio album by San Diego post-hardcore band The Plot to Blow Up the Eiffel Tower, released on Revelation Records and Three One G on February 15, 2005, on compact disc and vinyl formats respectively. The album showed a significant change in sound from the band's previous full-length, focusing much more on the styles of noise rock rather than just jazz punk. The album's title, artwork, and lyrical themes act as political and social commentary on both the presidency of George W. Bush and punk subculture, which the band felt was "dead" by the time they recorded the album.

== Writing and music ==
The Plot's first album, 2004's Dissertation, Honey, included free jazz elements. Due to interviewers referring to their music as punk jazz, the band feeling they were being pigeonholed into the genre. As a result, the Plot opted to forgo their jazz influences on their followup; according to guitarist Chuck Rowell, "There is absolutely no jazz on [Love in the Fascist Brothel]. There’s a saxophone that sounds really weird and it leads the songs sometimes, but no jazz."

The album has a heavy theme of nazism and fascism throughout the lyrics and artwork. According to the band, this was done to not only mock neo-nazi subculture, but it also acted as political and social commentary on George W. Bush and punk subculture as well.

== Track listing ==
1. "Reichstag Rock" – 1:45
2. "Exile on Vain Street" – 2:24
3. "Love in the Sex Prison" – 2:05
4. "Vulture Kontrol" – 2:26
5. "Rattus Über Alles" – 1:21
6. "Drake the Fake" – 3:05
7. "Angry, Young and Rich" – 3:12
8. "Lipstick SS" – 2:38
9. "Lawnmower Love" – 2:08
10. "SLC Hunks" – 2:55

== Personnel ==
=== The Plot To Blow Up The Eiffel Tower ===
- Brandon Welchez - Vocals, saxophone
- B.H. Peligro - Drums
- Charles Rowell - Guitar
- Willy Graves - Bass

=== Additional Musicians ===
- Brett Bohart
- Gabriel Sundy
- Gena Abbo
- Kelly Kotner
- Robert Ackly

=== Artwork ===
- David McHenry - Photography
- xTonyx - Photography
- The Plot To Blow Up The Eiffel Tower - Layout

=== Production ===
- Rafter Roberts - Engineering, production
- The Plot To Blow Up The Eiffel Tower - Production
- John Golden - Mastering
