= The Plot to Blow Up the Eiffel Tower =

American punk/noise band

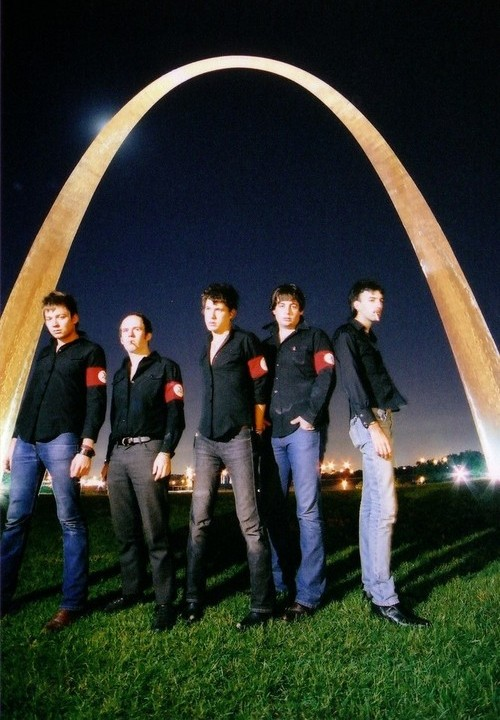

Background information
- Origin: Loraine, California, United States
- Genres: Post-hardcore, punk jazz, noise rock, post-punk
- Years active: 2001–2006
- Past members: Brandon Welchez; Willy Graves; Charles Walsh; Brian Hill; Cody; Dan Maier

The Plot to Blow Up the Eiffel Tower was an American four-piece noise rock/post-hardcore band from San Diego, California, United States, that formed in 2001. After disbanding in 2006, drummer Brian Hill now plays with The Soft Pack, while singer Brandon Welchez and Charles Rowell formed the duo Crocodiles.

== Background ==
The group's name is derived from a book by rock critic Greil Marcus, Lipstick Traces: A Secret History of the 20th Century, itself a reference to a line in Guy Debord's 1978 film In girum imus nocte et consumimur igni.

On their earlier work, including their debut full-length Dissertation, Honey, released in 2004, their music incorporated elements of free jazz, whilst later works incorporated a more noise and lo-fi approach.

The band was known for their confrontational live shows. While performing on their 2005 tour with The Blood Brothers and Big Business, each member wore a red armband with "PLOT" written in a white circle, intentionally mimicking the armbands worn by members of the Nazi Party. The armbands were in keeping with thematic/aesthetic elements associated with the 3rd Reich that was prevalent on their album Love in the Fascist Brothel.

Welchez also claims they caused a "near riot" in Salt Lake City, and caused a "piss waterfall" in Baltimore, which led to them being banned from playing in the city.

The Plot won the San Diego Music Award's "Best Punk Act" award two years running, in both 2005 and 2006.

== Breakup ==
On September 26, 2006, The Plot announced via a Myspace bulletin that their then-current U.S. tour would be the band's last before disbanding. Their final show was in their hometown of San Diego. A posthumous release of a seven-song mini-LP entitled Saviors & Suckers on Three One G records was in the works, but Three One G has since said they will not be releasing the title.

== Aftermath ==
Brandon, William, and Brian (with the addition of Andrew Miller) created The Prayers, a more 1960s pop-influenced band that released a CD/12" EP entitled "God Save the Prayers" on Art Fag Records in mid-2007. Willie and Brian have since left The Prayers, Willie replaced by Chuck Rowell and Brian replaced by Joel Issac Black.

Charles Rowland and The Vultures have released an album entitled Vulture Land and are also planning to put out a single called "Let Them Bleed/Sex Bomb" on Collective Records. Sir Charles has also written two books: Darkland and Friends, Lovers, and Suckers (with Wes Eisold).

Dan Maier, the original bass player and recording engineer for the first few Plot releases, continues to produce and record albums in San Diego.

Brandon and Sir Charles also participate in Skull Kontrol, an odd conglomerate that usually also involves Welchez's bandmate Andrew Miller and Mario Orduno of Art Fag fame. Skull Kontrol's mission is to put on amazing parties, mainly at clubs in the San Diego area, featuring combinations of its four main members and various other musicians/artists/creative-types DJing and causing a scene.

The Prayers broke up in March 2008, having released only one recording and having completed only one US tour, with two brief trips to the UK. Brandon and Sir Charles have since reunited as a two-piece; Crocodiles. Brian Hill is currently playing drums in The Soft Pack (aka The Muslims).

Willy Graves died Monday, September 15, 2008, as per information supplied by his mother.

== Style and influences ==
Plot's style is a fusion of the genres: post-hardcore, jazz, post-punk, noise rock, indie rock, spoken word and hardcore punk. The band took influences from John Zorn, Swing Kids, Miles Davis, Drive Like Jehu, Bad Brains and Fugazi.

== Members ==
- Brandon Welchez - vocals/saxophone
- Willy Graves - bass (died 2008)
- Charles Rowell (A.K.A. Charles Rowland, Sir Charles or Chuck) - guitar
- Brian Hill - drums (A.K.A. B.H. Peligro - in tribute to drummer D.H. Peligro of the Dead Kennedys)
- Cody Laing- bass (2001)
- Dan Maier - bass (2001–2003)

== Discography ==
- If You Cut Us, We Bleed (EP)
- "Split 7" with Necktie Party"
- Dissertation, Honey
- Love in the Fascist Brothel
- INRI (EP)
- Saviors & Suckers (unreleased)
