= Qui (band) =

American band

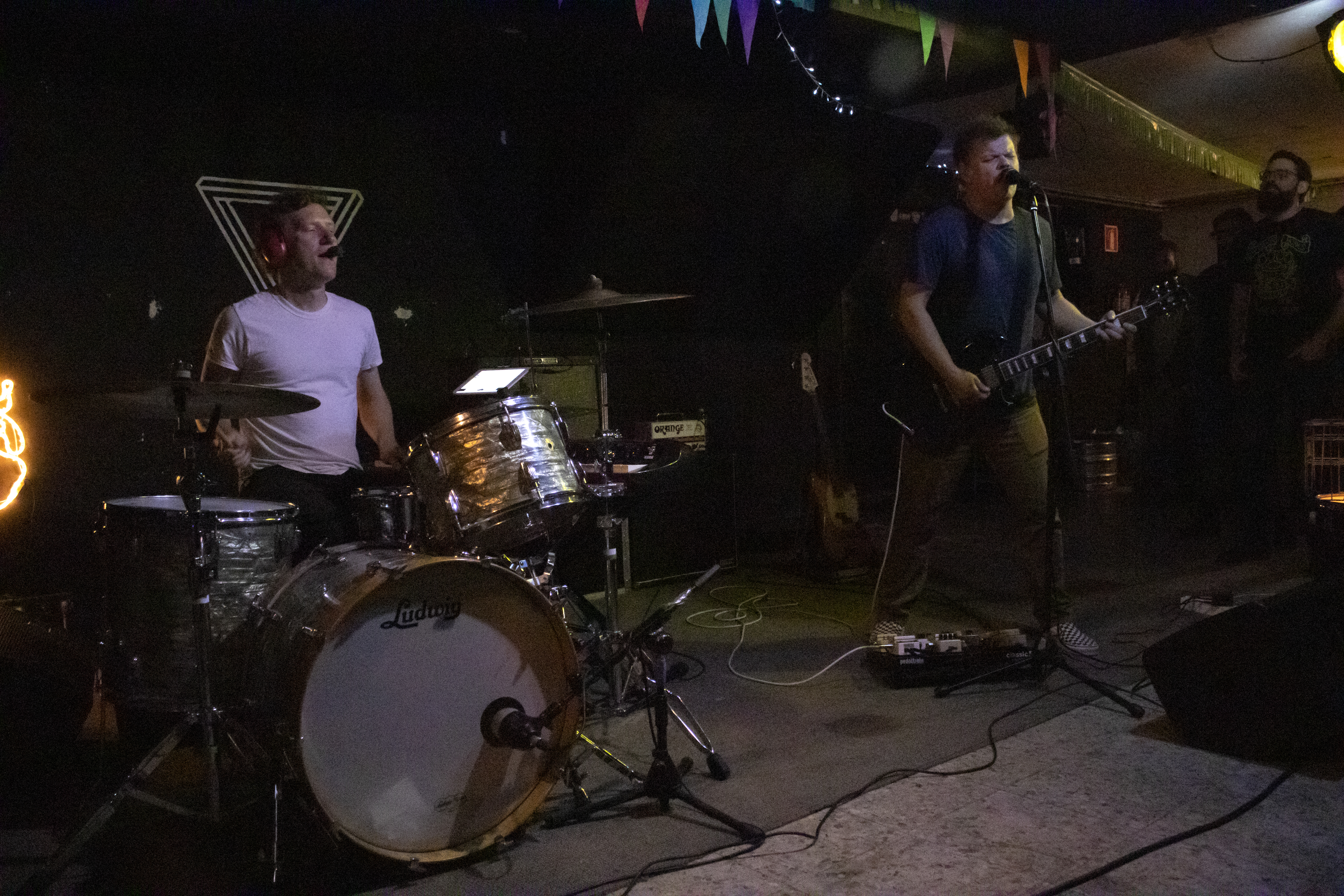
- Qui performing at Liceo Mutante, Pontevedra

Background information
- Origin: Los Angeles
- Genres: Noise rock, alternative rock
- Years active: 2000–present
- Labels: Heart of a Champion, Infrasonic Sound, Ipecac, Org Music, Cobraside, Geertruida, Joyful Noise, Blank City, Three One G
- Members: Paul Christensen; Matt Cronk
- Past members: David Yow
- Website: https://www.facebook.com/quiband

Qui (pronounced as "Kwee") are a rock group formed in 2000 in Los Angeles by Paul Christensen (drums/vocals) and Matt Cronk (guitar/vocals). A combination of punk, noise and experimental rock, they released their first full-length album Baby Kisses in 2003.

In 2006, after performing a number of shows as a guest vocalist, David Yow (ex-Scratch Acid, The Jesus Lizard) joined the band as vocalist, and features on the 2007 album Love's Miracle, released on Mike Patton's label Ipecac Recordings. Most of the songs on this album were written before Yow joined, but were reworked to take account of his vocals. The first release with Yow fully involved came with the 2007 single "Today, Gestation" / "Freeze".

In early 2008, Yow was hospitalized with a punctured lung after a show in Pittsburgh. He has now fully recovered and the band announced European dates that took place during the second half of 2008. As of 2013, David Yow is no longer in the band.

In 2015, Qui recorded an album's worth of material, but had difficulty getting a record label to release it. After receiving several offers from smaller record labels to release EPs and singles by the band, the unreleased album was broken up into several EPs, 7" vinyl singles and splits. How to Get Ideas was originally scheduled to be released as a 7" single, but was upgraded to a 10" vinyl EP once Dutch record label Geertruida found out from a local pressing plant that the cost of manufacturing a 7" and 10" vinyl were the same. The EP was set to be released in support of a two-month European and United Kingdom tour, spanning from March 26 to May 15, 2016, but due to continuous mistakes and delays by the Record Industry vinyl pressing plant in Haarlem, Netherlands, the record label and band did not receive the copies until nearly the end of the tour. In 2017 the band released a cover of the jazz standard Misty as a single on Blank City Records.

== Discography ==
=== Albums ===
- Baby Kisses (Heart of a Champion, 2003)
- Love's Miracle (Ipecac, 2007)
- Life, Water, Living... (Cobraside, 2014)
- Qui w/ Trevor Dunn (Joyful Noise, 2017)
- Snuh (Three One G, 2018)

=== EPs ===
- How to Get Ideas (Geertruida, 2016)

=== Singles ===
- "Today, Gestation" / "Freeze" (Infrasonic Sound, 2007)
- "Awkward Human Insterest" / Mike Watt and the Secondmen "No One" (Org Music, 2013) split single
- "Spectacle D'Horreur" / Skating Polly "Chipper on Ezastar" (Org Music, 2016) split single
- "Misty" / "Pee Pee Vs Homo" (Blank City, 2017)
