= It's Getting Tougher to Say the Right Things =

Compilation album by Unbroken
- Released: March 24, 2000
- Recorded: 1992 – 1995
- Genre: Hardcore punk
- Length: 47:37
- Label: Indecision Records

Unbroken chronology
Life. Love. Regret. (1994)	It's Getting Tougher to Say the Right Things (2000)	Death of True Spirit (2003)

Professional ratings
Review scores
Source	Rating
Kerrang!	2/5 stars

It's Getting Tougher to Say the Right Things is a compilation album of early material by the Californian hardcore punk band, Unbroken. All tracks were recorded between 1992 and 1995, and released in March 2000 by Indecision Records. Love Will Tear Us Apart is a cover of the song from Joy Division. Track 11 Unheard actually finishes at 2:56, followed by five minutes of silence and 4 hidden live tracks.

== Track listing ==
No.	Title	Length
1.	"Absentee Debate" (Circa '77 7-inch)	3:05
2.	"Crushed on You" (Circa '77 7-inch)	2:46
3.	"And" (And/Fall on Proverb 7-inch)	2:31
4.	"Fall on Proverb" (And/Fall on Proverb 7-inch)	3:10
5.	"Love Will Tear Us Apart" (Unbroken/Abhinanda split 7-inch)	3:39
6.	"Final Expression" (Unbroken/Groundwork split 7-inch)	3:08
7.	"Set Up" (Unbroken/Groundwork split 7-inch)	3:25
8.	"Blanket" (Lacking Mindset compilation)	2:33
9.	"You Won't Be Back" (You Won't Be Back 7-inch)	2:39
10.	"Pain They Face" (You Won't Be Back 7-inch)	2:42
11.	"Unheard" (It's for Life compilation)	17:59

== Credits ==
- Dave Claibourn – vocals
- Eric Allen – guitar
- Steve Miller – guitar
- Rob Moran – bass
- Todd Beattie – drums
