= Death of True Spirit =

Compilation album by Unbroken
- Released: August 12, 2003
- Recorded: 1993 – 1994
- Genre: Hardcore punk
- Length: 61:29
- Label: Indecision Records
- Producer: Unbroken

Unbroken chronology
It's Getting Tougher to Say the Right Things (2000)	Death of True Spirit (2003)

Professional ratings
Review scores
Source	Rating
Allmusic	(?)

Death of True Spirit is the second of two compilation albums released by Indecision Records featuring material by Californian hardcore punk band, Unbroken. It is made up of 1993's Ritual, and 1994's Life. Love. Regret. albums. Indecision released it in August 2003.

== Track listing ==
1. "D4" – 3:01
2. "End of a Life Time" – 2:59
3. "In the Name of Progression" – 4:36
4. "Razor" – 2:47
5. "Final Expression" – 3:17
6. "Blanket" – 2:30
7. "Recluse" – 3:31
8. "Setup" – 4:04
9. "Curtain" – 8:59
10. "Zero Hour" – 3:45
11. "Shallow" – 4:11
12. "Unheard" – 2:53
13. "My Time" – 2:50
14. "Break Me Own" – 2:48
15. "Reflection" – 3:36
16. "Remain" – 3:13
17. "Cold Front" – 2:29
- Tracks 1 – 9 from Life. Love. Regret. (1994)
- Tracks 10 – 17 from Ritual (1993)

== Credits ==
- David Claibourn – vocals
- Steve Miller – guitar
- Eric Allen – guitar
- Rob Moran – bass
- Todd Beattie – drums
- Recorded 1993 (Ritual) and 1994 (Life. Love. Regret.)
- Produced by Unbroken
- Engineered by Jeff Forrest
