= Holy Molar =

American noise rock band

- Origin: San Diego, California, U.S.
- Genres: Noise rock
- Years active: 2001–2007
- Labels: Three One G
- Members: Mark McCoy; Gabe Serbian; Justin Pearson; Maxamillion Avila; Bobby Bray

Holy Molar is a noise rock band from San Diego, composed of vocalist Mark McCoy (under the stage name "Mark McMolar"), guitarist Gabe Serbian, bassist Justin Pearson, drummer Maxamillion Avila and keyboardist Bobby Bray.

== History ==
Holy Molar formed in San Diego in 2001. The band consisted of vocalist Mark McCoy (of Charles Bronson, Virgin Mega Whore, and Das Oath), Bobby Bray, Justin Pearson, and Gabe Serbian (all of The Locust) and Maxamillion Avila (of Antioch Arrow, Heroin, and Final Conflict). The band dressed in white lab coats, medical masks, and sometimes appeared spattered with blood.

The band released a live album in 2001, titled Live at the Metropolitan Correctional Center. In 2003, the band released their first album The Whole Tooth and Nothing but the Tooth. They issued a split with Ex Models in 2004 and an EP, Cavity Search, in 2007.

Holy Molar never officially disbanded; a post from their record label, Three One G, stated that "you never know, perhaps one day it will emerge from the depths, bringing with it its trademark bursts of shrieks and screams, much like a cavity left unattended or a bad root canal."

== Members ==
- Mark McMolar – vocals
- Gabe Serbian – guitar
- Justin Pearson – bass
- Maxamillion Avila – drums
- Bobby Bray – keyboards

== Discography ==
Albums

- The Whole Tooth and Nothing but the Tooth (2003, Three One G)

EPs/splits

- Ex Models/Holy Molar (2004, Three One G)
- Cavity Search (2007, Three One G)

Live albums

- Live at the San Diego Metropolitan Correctional Center (2001, Three One G)

DVDs

- Dentist the Menace (2006, Three One G)
