= Over My Dead Body (band) =

American band

- Origin: San Diego County, California, U.S.
- Genres: Hardcore punk
- Years active: 2000–2004
- Labels: Indecision, Takeover
- Past members: Daniel Sant; Aaron Cooley; Tommy Anthony; Rob Moran; Scott Lopian; David Kennedy; Mike Arney; Adam Meehan

Over My Dead Body was a straight edge hardcore punk band from San Diego.

The band was formed by Daniel Sant (vocals), Aaron Cooley, Scott Lopian (guitars), Rob Moran (bass) and Tommy Anthony (drums). The members formerly played in Unbroken, Built To Last, Forced Life, Palpatine and Four Walls Falling. David Kennedy replaced Lopian for a short period, but ultimately left due to commitments regarding Box Car Racer.

Their debut release on Indecision Records was the EP No Runners in 2001, followed by the album Rusty Medals and Broken Badges near the end of the same year. In 2002, the band released a split with Death Threat, with whom they did a summer tour. After the tour, Moran was replaced with Adam Beehan on bass, and moreover Kennedy was followed by Mike Arney. In the summer of 2003, Over My Dead Body toured with Death By Stereo. The same year saw the release of their final album Sink or Swim.

Vocalist Daniel Sant has gone on to form punk band Northern Towns.

== Discography ==
Title	Release date	Notes	Label
This Feeling Will Never Fade	2000	Demo tape	Self-released
No Runners	2001	EP	Indecision Records
Rusty Medals and Broken Badges	2001	First album	Indecision Records
Sink or Swim	2003	Second album	Takeover/Indecision
Time X/Over My Dead Body	2001	7" split	Phyte Records
Death Threat/Over My Dead Body	2002	7" split	Bridge 9 Records
Swindle/Over My Dead Body		7" split	Slow Gun Records
