= Dissertation, Honey =

Studio album by The Plot to Blow up The Eiffel Tower
- Released: June 17, 2003
- Recorded: Spring 2003
- Genre: Punk jazz
- Length: 25:31
- Label: Happy Couples Never Last

The Plot to Blow up The Eiffel Tower chronology
If You Cut Us, We Bleed (EP) (2003)	Dissertation, Honey (2003)	Love in the Fascist Brothel (2005)

Professional ratings
Review scores
Source	Rating
AbsolutePunk.net	(86%) link
Allmusic	link

Dissertation, Honey is the debut studio album by San Diego band The Plot to Blow Up the Eiffel Tower, released on the Happy Couples Never Last label on June 17, 2003. Note that the intro and outro songs, "Exhibitionism" and "Monotonous" are excerpts from one of poet Kailani Amerson's spoken verse sessions.

== Track listing ==
All tracks by The Plot to Blow up The Eiffel Tower:

1. "Exhibitionism" – 1:02
2. "Sometimes I Wish I'd Lost a Leg" – 1:33
3. "One Stab Deserves Another" – 2:49
4. "Funeral Procession" – 1:28
5. "For Marcus" – 2:53
6. "Johnny, You're All Grown Up" – 2:12
7. "Her Health Violation" – 1:37
8. "Attached to the Hip" – 3:12
9. "Circuit" – 1:51
10. "It's in His Kiss" – 1:37
11. "Comeback 1968" – 1:19
12. "Safety is Of" – 2:33
13. "Monotonous" – 1:25

== Personnel ==
- Brandon Welchez - vocals, saxophone
- Dan Maier - bass
- Charles Rowell - guitar
- Brian Hill - drums
