= Justin Pearson (musician) =

American musician (born 1975)

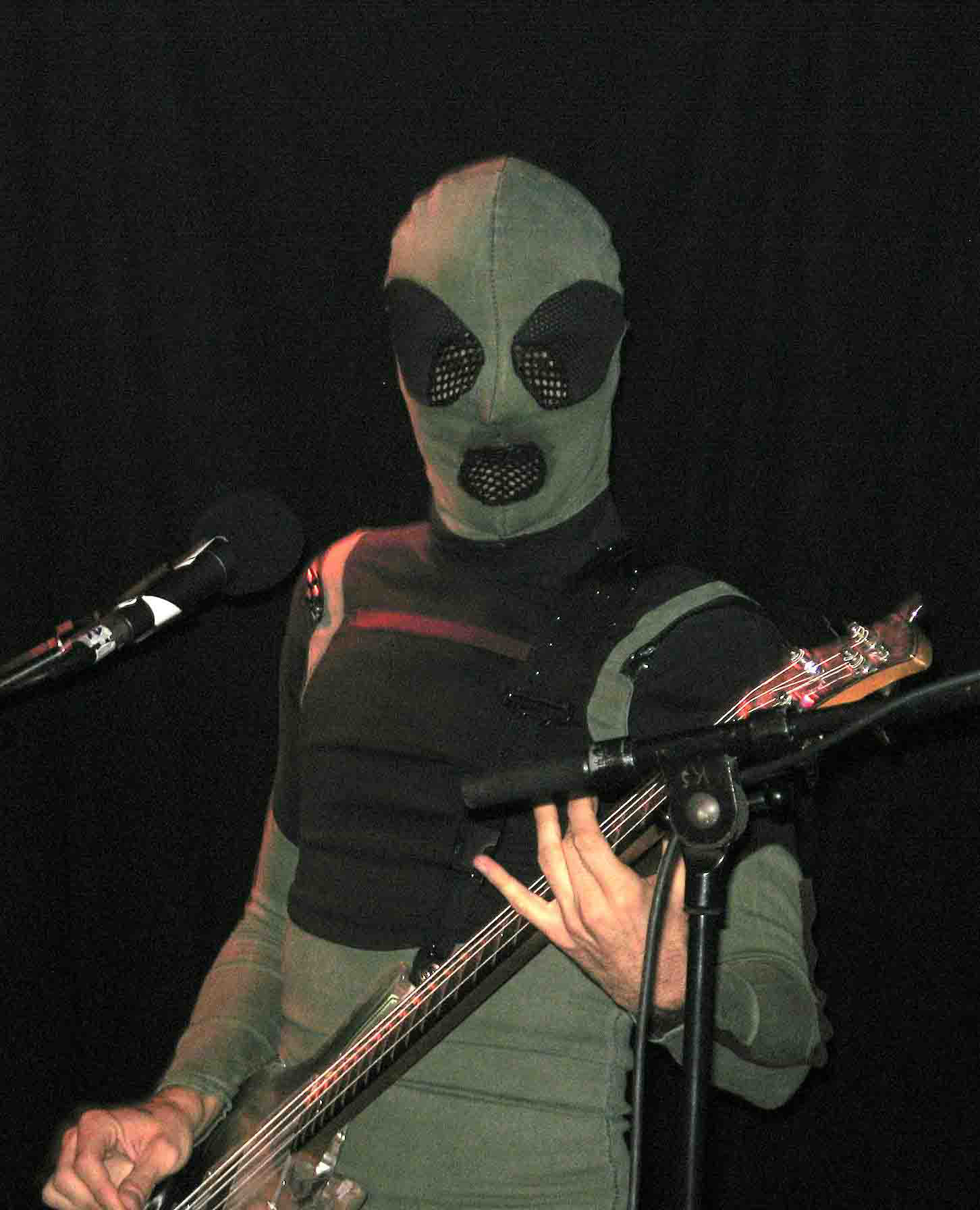
- Pearson onstage, 2011

Background information
- Born: August 20, 1975 (age 51); Chicago, Illinois
- Origin: San Diego, California
- Genres: Hardcore punk; grindcore; powerviolence; experimental rock; noise rock; thrash metal
- Occupations: Musician; vocalist; author; actor
- Instruments: Vocals; bass guitar
- Years active: 1991–present
- Labels: Three One G; Gold Standard Laboratories; ANTI-; Epitaph; Dim Mak Records; VICE Records; Ultra Music; Ipecac Recordings

Justin Pearson (born August 20, 1975) is an American musician and record label owner, known for being the vocalist and bassist in a number of San Diego–based noise rock, punk and powerviolence bands, as well as running his record label Three One G Records. Starting off in the punk outfit Struggle in 1994, ensuing projects such as Swing Kids, The Locust, Dead Cross and Retox. He has collaborated with Kool Keith, Gabe Serbian, Karen O, Nick Zinner, Adam Gnade, Invisibl Skratch Piklz, Asia Argento, The Bloody Beetroots, Silent, among many others.

Pearson has been cited as an influence for his work in Swing Kids and The Locust on the genres of noise rock and powerviolence.

== Early life ==
Justin Pearson was born on August 20, 1975, and initially raised in Phoenix, Arizona, by his parents. He was an only child and went by the nickname J.P. Pearson has stated he liked music and the aesthetics of rock music since he was little. Around ten his mother's cousin let him borrow a guitar, and he eventually moved onto bass. He also began skateboarding and listening to the Thrasher skate/rock compilation tapes with bands like Septic Death, the Sex Pistols, The Misfits, and Suicidal Tendencies. He has stated he was especially drawn towards the music that touched on social politics. Pearson also got into break dancing and early rap like Run DMC and the Beastie Boys, as well as developing an interest in metal. In Phoenix he lived a couple blocks away from some of the members of Slayer.

When Pearson was twelve years old his father was murdered. Later that year in 1987, Pearson and his mother moved to San Diego, California, specifically Clairemont. His mother's new boyfriend moved with them, and Pearson has stated that the man was physically and emotionally abusive towards both of them. At his new middle school he also faced death threats and attacks from someone he referred to as a skinhead. Pearson continued to play guitar, taking a few lessons before teaching himself how to play the instrument with friends. At age 13 he met future collaborator Eric Allen. He met and befriended Matt Anderson of End of the Line at the age of 14. Pearson was soon exposed to the distinctive San Diego hardcore punk scene and began attending all the all-ages shows he could, discovering influential local bands such as Amenity, Heroin, Forced Down, Drive Like Jehu, and Crash Worship.

Pearson also attended metal shows at house parties, eventually discovering Che Café, an all-ages venue on the campus of UC San Diego. The Che frequently hosted underground metal and punk bands. At the venue he saw shows by Blast, Chain of Strength, Carcass, Chumbawamba, Crossed Out, Inside Out, Filth, and Sleep. Pearson befriended a number of the musicians, stating "I'd go [to the Che] and talk to all the bands. They were really down-to-earth people, but they had this art that was just mind-blowing. When they played they would turn into ax murderers on instruments." At the age of 16, his home situation escalated to Pearson having to fight back against his mother's boyfriend, and he was kicked out of the house. He stayed in school and graduated, living off social security checks from his father's death. When not in school he also continued to tour with Struggle, and while touring they met bands such as Filth and Rorschach, and Blatz.

== Music career ==
=== Early musical projects ===
Struggle was formed when Pearson was only 15. Pearson played bass alongside vocalist Dylan Scharf, drummer Jose Palafox and guitarists Eric Allen, Tobias Nathaniel and Cliff Cunningham. Struggle was a San Diego punk band, during their three-year span, the band released a self-titled 7", 12" and a split with hardcore punk band Undertow. Despite being only high school-aged, the band had opportunities to share musical space with other significant bands with similar ideological perspectives such as Born Against, Downcast, Bikini Kill, and Econochrist. The band went on its first tour that year in 1991, and Pearson has since described how he saw his bandmates as his adopted family. When not in school Pearson continued to tour with Struggle, and while touring they met bands such as Filth and Rorschach, and Blatz. Struggle released recordings on Undertow Records, Ebullition Records, and Bloodlink Records, and disbanded in 1994.

=== Swing Kids ===
After the dissolution of Struggle in 1994, Pearson founded the band Swing Kids, an early San Diego hardcore punk band. He formed the band along with Eric Allen, Jimmy LaValle, Jose Palafox, and John Brady. Pearson served as vocalist and sole lyricist, and has described the themes as largely influenced by social political issues. Their music was characterized by Pearson's spoken/screamed vocals and their melodic/chaotic rhythms and song structures. The group disbanded in 1997. Swing Kids are also credited with the unintentional creation of the fad "Spock Rock" during the mid-1990s; largely due to many of their fans emulating Pearson's fashion sense and hair style. Pearson has expressed dislike of the term.

=== The Locust ===
The Locust was formed in 1994 by Bobby Bray, Justin Pearson, Dylan Scharf, Dave Warshaw, and Dave Astor. After a number of personnel changes, they arrived at the current four-piece lineup in 2001, consisting of Bray, Pearson, Joey Karam and Gabe Serbian. The Locust was initially a powerviolence project whose first release was a split with genre pioneers Man Is the Bastard. Later releases incorporated synthesizers and became increasingly theatrical. The band regularly played shows in all-ages punk clubs in Los Angeles and San Diego, usually donning insect costumes.

=== Some Girls ===
Some Girls began in early 2002 when singer Wesley Eisold and guitarist Rob Moran spoke of putting together a hardcore band that would "fuck people up." The very next day, drummer Sal Gallegos was called in to assist Eisold and Moran and, within a few hours, the first Some Girls songs were created.

After being impressed by the band's demos Deathwish Inc offered to put out the band's first 7-inch, The Rains after some remixing and remastering. After the release the band wanted to play live shows, however the band did not yet have a bass player. The band's original idea was to get a different bass player for each show, however the band got in touch with bassist Justin Pearson and after a two shows the band asked Pearson to join. In the months that followed, Some Girls added a second guitar player Christopher Sprague and recorded another EP, The Blues. The band's EPs would later be collected on the band's 2003 compilation album All My Friends Are Going Death.

=== Retox ===
Retox formed in 2011, originally out of founding members Justin Pearson's and Gabe Serbian's disappointment that their previous band Head Wound City was too short-lived and wanted to rehash that sound, though this sound evolved over time and with the addition of Thor Dickey and Michael Crain. The band released a self-titled EP and their debut album Ugly Animals that year through Ipecac Recordings, a California-based record label co-founded by Mike Patton and Greg Werckman. Ugly Animals was self-funded by the band members and recorded on analog tape to capture the aesthetic of the band that couldn't be captured digitally, a decision made by engineer Manny Nieto.

=== Crimson Curse ===
Founded in 1998, The Crimson Curse was Pearson's first group to include keyboards and elements of deathrock. According to Pearson the band was an attempt to return a sense of lunacy and excitement to the hardcore punk scene, which had begun to appear dry and pedantic to Pearson. Pearson says he modeled the group on the Dead Boys. The band also included Jimmy LaValle and Jesse F. Keeler of Death from Above 1979/MSTRKRFT. Pearson has stated "we got all these fucked up kids together. Made some punk music. That was it. But as a band we didn't get very far." A review of the band's first demo stated "The recording was horrible, but was enough for me to realize that they sounded godlike."

=== Holy Molar ===
In 2001, Pearson alongside vocalist Mark McCoy (under the stage name Mark McMolar), guitarist Gabe Serbian of The Locust, drummer Maxamillion Avila and keyboardist Bobby Bray formed Holy Molar. The band dressed in white lab coats, medical masks, and sometimes appeared spattered with blood.

=== Head Wound City ===
In 2005, Pearson joined the supergroup Head Wound City alongside, Jordan Blilie and Cody Votolato both of The Blood Brothers, Nick Zinner of the Yeah Yeah Yeahs, and Gabe Serbian.

On September 20, 2014, Head Wound City reunited and played their first show in nearly eight years at BedRocktoberfest in Bedrock in Los Angeles, it is also their second show ever as a band. The band reportedly performed two new songs, which were dubbed "nu 1" and "nu 2" on the band's setlist. In January 2015, the band announced that their self-titled 2005 EP will be remastered and reissued on March 10 via Three One G. The EP's press release notes state that the "members are optimistic about creating new material in the future". In February 2016, Head Wound City announced they were releasing a new album titled, A New Wave of Violence. Also in February 2016 the band released the single "Scraper". In March 2016 the band released the single "Born To Burn". The album was released on May 13, 2016, through Vice Records. The album was produced by Ross Robinson and was written over the course of a week in January 2015. The album is named after a 1982 Raymond Pettibon magazine.

=== Planet B ===
In 2014, the band Planet B was formed by Pearson and Luke Henshaw who were later joined by Gabe Serbian. Planet B made contributions to the Incompresa soundtrack, their live debut at the San Diego Public Library in conjunction with a screening of the film. Since, they have also collaborated with Kool Keith, Adam Gnade, and Invisibl Skratch Piklz. In 2024, they released their sophomore album "Fiction Prediction" on Three One G which featured multiple guests and was "a second heaping helping of their turntable-infused, cult-horror-movie-score-worshiping, hardcore-punk-saturated soup"

=== Dead Cross ===
Pearson and Dave Lombardo had both individually previously worked with producer Ross Robinson, who asked Pearson to play on Poppy Jean Crawford's demo as a session bassist. Pearson later found out that Lombardo was also playing on the demo; Crain also took part in these sessions. Lombardo noted that he had to fill some tour dates and was lacking a band, so Lombardo, Pearson and Crain formed a live band in about 12 days; this project became Dead Cross. Dead Cross was officially formed on November 30, 2015, by Crain, Pearson, Lombardo and vocalist Gabe Serbian. The band made their live debut that December. Gabe Serbian left the band and later the year Mike Patton joined the band.

=== Deaf Club ===
Deaf Club is an American punk band that formed in 2019. As of 2021, the band is made up of vocalist Justin Pearson (The Locust, Head Wound City), guitarist Brian Amalfitano (ACxDC), bassist Jason Klein (Run With The Hunted), and drummer Scott Osment (Glassing, Weak Flesh). The band have releases on Three One G, Sub Pop and Sweatband Records. They are "a savage sound bath dripping with sardonicism: a blastbeat-centric hardcore punk assault channeling crust, thrash, and grind (un)sensibilities. Succinct pauses, surreal frequencies and effects, breakneck pace and sharply hurled vocals characterize the band’s aesthetic, which seems as though it is rooted in a sort of nasty-sound-meets-highbrow-message ethos."

In 2019 they released their first EP "Contemporary Sickness" on Three One G. The following year a limited edition cassette was released on Sweatband Records which featured remixes of the debut EP by the likes Yawns (GothBoiClique). Towards the end of 2020, they released a limited edition lathe version of "The Wait" by Killing Joke, alongside a cover version of "Wardance" by Human Issue Collective. Their debut album "Productive Disruption" was released in 2022 on Three One G and Sweatband Records. Later in 2022, they released the EP "Bad Songs Forever" which featured a cover of "Broken Face" by Pixies (band). In 2024, a split EP with Fuck Money was released on Sub Pop and Three One G which featured a cover version (with HIRS Collective) of "Tourette's" by Nirvana (band). In September 2025, Deaf Club released a full-length album called We Demand a Permanent State of Happiness.

=== Other bands and side-projects ===
Pearson was part of the short lived band Ground Unicorn Horn. In the band released 2006 single "Damn I Wish I Was Fat".

From 2008 he has also been a member of Leg Lifters, which consisted of Pearson and Nathan Joyner. Leg Lifters is considered a production team. They produced a radio show with Vestal Radio, web video episodes, and remixes. They also released original musical material, including a collaboration with Travis Ryan of Cattle Decapitation.

All Leather was founded in 2008. It consists of Pearson on vocals, Nathan Joyner on guitar, Jung Sing on drums, and Eric Livingston on synthesizers. They released their debut EP Hung Like A Horse on Dim Mak Records. In August 2009 they released a remix album entitled Hung Like a Donut, also on Dim Mak, which featured a remix by Bloody Beetroots. On September 12, 2010, All Leather won the San Diego Music Awards "Best Hard Rock Album" category for their album When I Grow Up, I Wanna Fuck Like a Girl.

In 2021, Pearson teamed up with Lombardo and Henshaw once more, and created Satanic Planet which also features Lucien Greaves of The Satanic Temple. They released the self-titled album on Three One G which featured guests such as Travis Ryan (Cattle Decapitation), Jung Sing (Silent), Shiva Honey, and Steve-O amongst others.

== Three One G ==
In 1994, Pearson founded the independent label Three One G, or 31G Records. The first record released on the new label was the 1994 single "And / Fall On Proverb" by San Diego metalcore band Unbroken. The second release was a reissue of the recent debut ep from Swing Kids. He funded the label with the financial aid he was receiving from the community college he was attending, and has stated he was partly inspired to start 31G by Vinyl Communications and Gravity Records. As of 2025, the label is run by Pearson and others.

== Author ==
Pearson has written four books. The first is entitled From the Graveyard of the Arousal Industry, and chronicles his life from childhood leading up to its release in 2010. The second is How to Lose Friends and Irritate People (2011), which describes his experiences in the world of EDM. His third book is a collection of his lyrics (and some writings) published in 2018 called The Race To Zero and is published by Three One G and Pioneers Press. In 2025, his fourth book "GG Alien and the Mystery Meat" was published by Three One G and Bread and Roses Publishing, and "is mainly centered around Pearson’s time working various queer spaces as security or barback between tours with The Locust and Retox, particularly at a place called Rich’s".

== Actor ==
While widely known for his performance on an episode of The Jerry Springer Show in the late 1990s, Justin has more recently taken part in numerous other acting roles. In 2014, he played the character Ricky in Asia Argento's film, Misunderstood. He has also done cartoon voice work on an episode of Cartoon Network's Uncle Grandpa, entitled Odd-yssey. In 2017, he played himself in Joe Cardamone's The Icarus Line Must Die. Additionally, he has been interviewed in documentaries Records Collecting Dust and Parallel Planes.

The documentary filmmaker Jon Nix is producing a feature-length documentary on Pearson entitled "Don't Fall In Love With Yourself".

== Personal life ==
Justin Pearson is a vegan and has participated in campaigns for PETA on behalf of animal rights. He only uses secondhand leather and for the most part eats non-genetically modified, organic food. Pearson became a vegetarian in his early teens for ethical reasons, inspired by aspects of the punk community, especially the group Downcast and reading No Answers fanzine.

Justin has been in a relationship with photographer Becky DiGiglio since 2015.

He had a female Cocker Spaniel named Gee Gee that appeared in some of his videos. Pearson dedicated himself to her "well-being and longevity" and made local campaigns for some of her health problems. She died in early 2016. Today, he has a male Cocker Spaniel named Captain.

== Podcasts ==
Since 2015 Pearson has been presenting the podcast series Cult and Culture alongside Luke Henshaw. Over the years, guests have included John Waters, Michael Malarkey, members of Napalm Death, Lucien Greaves, and many others. The episodes are available to stream via all major streaming platforms and are often premiered via BrooklynVegan.

== Discography ==
Struggle

- One Settler, One Bullet: An Anthology (1994) (compilation album)

Swing Kids

- Discography (1996) (compilation album)
- Anthology (2020) (compilation album)

The Locust

- The Locust (1998)
- Plague Soundscapes (2003)
- Safety Second, Body Last (2005)
- New Erections (2007)

The Crimson Curse

- Greatest Hits (2001) (compilation album)

Holy Molar

- The Whole Tooth and Nothing but the Tooth (2003) (compilation album)

Some Girls

- All My Friends Are Going Death (2003) (compilation album)
- Heaven's Pregnant Teens (2006)

Head Wound City

- A New Wave of Violence (2016)

All Leather

- When I Grow Up, I Wanna Fuck Like a Girl (2010)
- Amateur Surgery On Half-Hog Abortion Island (2025) (compilation album)

Retox

- Ugly Animals (2011)
- YPLL (2013)
- Beneath California (2015)

Dead Cross

- Dead Cross (2017)
- II (2022)

Planet B

- Wrong Utopia (2015)
- Planet B (2018)
- Fiction Prediction (2024)

Satanic Planet

- Satanic Planet (2021)

Deaf Club

- Contemporary Sickness (2019)
- Productive Disruption (2021)
- Bad Songs Forever (2022)
- We Demand A Permanent State Of Happiness (2025)
