= Three One G =

- Founded: 1994
- Founder: Justin Pearson
- Distributors: Deathwish Inc., The Orchard
- Genre: Hardcore punk, punk rock, experimental, indie rock, noise rock
- Country of origin: United States
- Location: San Diego, California
- Official website: www.threeoneg.com

31G Records, or Three One G, is a San Diego, California-based independent record label, started by musician Justin Pearson in 1994 and focusing on punk and experimental music. The label has released a number of albums and compilations in what has been described as "freak punk" and "spaz-rock." Musicians on the label frequently collaborate, creating supergroups such as Holy Molar, Some Girls, and Head Wound City. Three One G's roster has featured many noise rock bands.

== History ==
31G Records was founded by Justin Pearson in San Diego, California in 1994. The name comes from the chorus of a Joy Division song "Warsaw", a song covered by Pearson's then-band, Swing Kids. The reference for '3-1-G' in the original song was to Rudolf Hess's prisoner number. The first album released on the new label was the 1994 single "And / Fall On Proverb" by metalcore band Unbroken. The second release was a reissue of the new debut album from hardcore punk and noise rock band Swing Kids, a band consisting of both the Unbroken guitarist Eric Allen and Pearson on vocals.

The following few releases also involved the same community of musicians, with a split between Swing Kids and Spanakorzo coming out in 1995, and the second released recording by Pearson's new band The Locust coming out as a split EP with Jenny Piccolo in 1996.

In 1998 Allysia Edwards joined with Pearson as a partner at the label, and their annual output began to increase. By January 2011, the label had put out approximately 60 releases total. Staff as of 2025 include Pearson, Marcus D’Camp, Brandon McMinn, Becky DiGiglio, Displaced/Replaced, and Lou Marron-Page.

According to Pearson, the label's best selling releases have been Discography by Swing Kids, as well as March on Electric Children by The Blood Brothers.

Three One G has released a compilation of Queen covers by their artists called Dynamite With a Laserbeam: Queen as Heard Through the Meat Grinder of Three One G, as well as a similar tribute to The Birthday Party titled Release The Bats. There has also been a DVD documentary, This is Circumstantial Evidence, made about Three One G. In 2020 the label released a tribute album to The Cramps called Really Bad Music For Really Bad People: The Cramps As Heard Through The Meat Grinder Of Three One G and featured artists such as METZ, Chelsea Wolfe, and Mike Patton.

=== Collaborations ===
Reviewers have described the Three One G community of musicians under the umbrella term "freak punk" or "spaz-rock," saying "the intense, the slightly frightening, and the brutal all find a place for themselves and their music in Three One G Records."

Most of the label's bands have shared members or interact within the same musical community, and according to Pearson,

"[The label] quickly developed into a family of artists who were all intertwined or on the same page as one another. We could all conceivably tour together, even sometimes collaborate and share members. To me, this is interesting, bringing so many new avenues of creativity, which are things that the music industry in general has since forgotten."

According to SSG Music, "It seems that members of San Diego label Three One G decide to form new supergroups at least once a year." Three One G bands Holy Molar, Ground Unicorn Horn, and Head Wound City were all formed with earlier musicians on the label. The label's supergroup Retox included Gabe Serbian and Pearson of The Locust, and many of the bands such as The Crimson Curse and Cattle Decapitation are connected to The Locust as well.

== Notable artists ==
- Adam Gnade
- ADULT.
- Antioch Arrow
- Arab on Radar
- Bastard Noise
- Black Dice
- The Blood Brothers
- Camera Obscura
- Cattle Decapitation
- Dead Cross
- Ex Models
- Fast Forward
- Gabe Serbian
- Head Wound City
- Holy Molar
- Kool Keith
- METZ
- Moving Units
- Orthrelm
- Qui
- Quintron
- Retox
- Some Girls
- Ssion
- Swing Kids
- The Plot To Blow Up The Eiffel Tower
- The Locust
- Unbroken
- Zeus!
- Zs

== Discography ==
=== Physical Releases ===
- Three One G #1: Unbroken "And/ Fall On Proverb" 7" EP
- Three One G #2: Swing Kids S/T 7" EP
- Three One G #3: Swing Kids/ Spanakorzo 10" EP
- Three One G #4: The Locust/ Jenny Piccolo 5" EP
- Three One G #5: Jenny Piccolo "Information Battle to Denounce the Genocide" LP
- Three One G #6: Swing Kids "Discography" CD
- Three One G #7: The Crimson Curse/ The Festival of Dead Deer 7" EP
- Three One G #8: Jenny Piccolo "Lowest Common Denominator" 7" EP
- Three One G #9: Festival Of Dead Deer "The Many Faces Of Mental Illness" LP/CD
- Three One G #10: The Crimson Curse "Greatest Hits" CD
- Three One G #11: Camera Obscura "We Talked Midi" b/w "Writing Kodak" 7" single
- Three One G #12: The Crimson Curse "Both Feet In The Grave" LP
- Three One G #13: Black Cat #13 "I Blast Off" 7" EP
- Three One G #14: Cattle Decapitation "Homovore" LP/CD
- Three One G #15: Asterisk "Dogma 1" LP
- Three One G #16: Holy Molar "Live at the San Diego Metropolitan Correctional Center" 7" EP
- Three One G #17: Black Dice "Ball" b/w "Peace In The Valley" 7" single/ book
- Three One G #18: Jenny Piccolo/ Asterisk 10" EP
- Three One G #19: Camera Obscura "To Paint The Kettle Black" 7" single
- Three One G #20: V/A "Dynamite With A Laser Beam" LP/CD
- Three One G #21: The Blood Brothers "March On Electric Children" LP/CD
- Three One G #22: Cattle Decapitation "Human Jerky" CD
- Three One G #23: Love Life "Hex It Out" b/w "Be Kind To Me" single
- Three One G #24: Holy Molar 10" EP
- Three One G #25: Holy Molar "The Whole Tooth And Nothing But The Tooth" CDx2
- Three One G #26: Orthrelm "2nd 18/04" LP/CD
- Three One G #27: Get Hustle "Dream Eagle" 12" EP
- Three One G #28: Moving Units 12" EP
- Three One G #29: Arab on Radar "Stolen Singles" CD
- Three One G #30: Unbroken "Circa 77 7" Single
- Three One G #31: Asterisk "Dogma" CD
- Three One G #32: Quintron "Are You Ready For An Organ Solo?" LP/CD
- Three One G #33: Antioch Arrow "Gems Of Masochism" LP/CD
- Three One G #34: V/A "Release The Bats" LP/CD
- Three One G #35: Holy Molar/ Ex Models split 7" EP
- Three One G #36: Arab on Radar "Queen Hygiene II/ Rough Day At The Orifice" CD
- Three One G #37: V/A "This Is Circumstantial Evidence" DVD
- Three One G #38: Moving Units "Dangerous Dreams" LP
- Three One G #39: The Locust "Follow The flock, Step In Shit" CDEP
- Three One G #40: Some Girls "All My Friends Are Going Death" LP
- Three One G #41: The Chinese Stars "A Rare Sensation" LP/CD
- Three One G #42: Fast Forward/ T Cells split LP/CDx2
- Three One G #43: Jaks "Here Lies The Body Of Jaks" CD
- Three One G #44: The Plot To Blow Up The Eiffel Tower "Love in the Fascist Brothel" LP
- Three One G #45: Some Girls "The DNA Will Have It's Say" 7"/CDEP
- Three One G #46: Some Girls "Heaven's Pregnant Teens" LP
- Three One G #47: Head Wound City S/T 10"/CDEP
- Three One G #48: Get Hustle "Rollin' In The Ruins" LP/CD
- Three One G #49: Holy Molar "Cavity Search" 7"/CDEP
- Three One G #50: Holy Molar "Dentist The Menace" DVD
- Three One G #51: Jenny Piccolo "Discography" CD
- Three One G #52: Das Oath S/T CD
- Three One G #53: Ground Unicorn Horn "Damn I wish I was Fat" b/w "Someone..." 7"/CDEP
- Three One G #54: The Chinese Stars "Listen To Your Left Brain" CD
- Three One G #55: Geronimo S/T CD
- Three One G #56: Arab on Radar "Sunshine For Shady People" DVD
- Three One G #57: Zs "Hard" EP 12" EP/CDEP
- Three One G #58: Justin Pearson "From The Graveyard Of The Arousal Industry" book
- Three One G #59: Swing Kids "Situations On Mars" 7" single
- Three One G #60: Rats Eyes "II" 7" EP
- Three One G #61: Retox S/T 7" EP
- Three One G #62: Retox "Ugly Animals" LP/CD
- Three One G #63: Secret Fun Club "Skull With Antlers" LP
- Three One G #64: Warsawwasraw "Jahiliya" 7" single
- Three One G #65 Justin Pearson "How To Lose Friends And Irritate People" Book/Flexi set
- Three One G #66 Retox "YPLL" LP/CD
- Three One G #67 Zeus! "Opera" LP/CD
- Three One G #68 Paper Mice "The Funny Papers" CD
- Three One G #69 Ill Saint M/Justin Pearson "Pigs Orphan" 12" EP
- Three One G #70 Bastard Noise/ Geronimo "Inertia" split 12"
- Three One G #71 Leg Lifters "Radical Humiliation" 7" single
- Three One G #72 Kill The Capulets "The Stranger" LP
- Three One G #73 Doomsday Student "A Walk Through Hysteria Park" LP
- Three One G #74 Warsawwasraw "Sensitizer" LP/ CD
- Three One G #75 All Leather "Insufficient Apology" 7" single
- Three One G #76 Qui/ Secret Fun Club 7" single
- Three One G #77 Narrows/ Retox 7" EP
- Three One G #78 Hot Nerds "Strategically Placed Bananas" LP
- Three One G #79 Retox "Beneath California" LP
- Three One G #80 Justin Pearson / Gabe Serbian "Incompresa" 7" single
- Three One G #81 Zeus! "Motomonotono" LP/CD
- Three One G #82 METZ "Eraser" 7" single
- Three One G #83 Hot Nerds "Generic Plans For a New Blunder" 7"
- Three One G #84 Into Violence S/T cassette EP
- Three One G #85 Planet B "Wrong Utopia" 7" single
- Three One G #86 Silent "A Century of Abuse" LP
- Three One G #87 Adam Gnade "Locust House" book
- Three One G #88 Doomsday Student "A Self-Help Tragedy" LP
- Three One G #89 Invisibl Skratch Piklz/ Planet B 7" single
- Three One G #90 Adam Gnade "Voicemails From the Great Satan" EP
- Three One G #91 Panicker LP
- Three One G #92 Death Eyes "Si La Revancha Fuera Una Opcion" 7" EP
- Three One G #93 Dead Cross Dead Cross LP/CD
- Three One G #94 Qui "Snuh" LP/ CD
- Three One G #95 The Chinese Stars "Heaven On Speed Dial" LP
- Three One G #96 Justin Pearson "Race to Zero" book
- Three One G #97 Microwaves "Via Weightlessness" LP
- Three One G #98 Planet B LP/CD
- Three One G #99 Kool Keith EP
- Three One G #100 V/A "Really Bad Music For Really Bad People" LP
- Three One G #101 Secret Fun Club LP
- Three One G #102 More Pain EP
- Three One G #103 Geronimo "Obsolete" LP
- Three One G #104 INUS "Western Spaghettification" LP
- Three One G #105 Zealot - R.I.P. 12" EP
- Three One G #106 Adam Gnade "This Is the End of Something But It's Not the End of You" book
- Three One G #107 Deaf Club "Contemporary Sickness" 7" EP
- Three One G #108 Downcast "Tell Me I'm Alive" LP
- Three One G #109 Swing Kids "Anthology" LP
- Three One G #110 Adam Gnade "Float Me Away, Floodwaters" book
- Three One G #111 Paper Mice "1-800 Mondays" LP
- Three One G #112 Silent "Modern Hate" LP
- Three One G #113 Zealot R.I.P. "The Extinction of You" LP
- Three One G #114 METZ "Acid" b/w "Slow Decay" 7"
- Three One G #115 Run For Your Fucking Life LP
- Three One G #116 Satanic Planet S/T LP
- Three One G #117 Deaf Club "Productive Disruption" LP
- Three One G #118 Under Attack "Preservations Crash" 7"EP
- Three One G #119 Sonido De La Frontera "Sonidero Guerrillero" LP
- Three One G #120 Run For Your Fucking Life S/T 7"
- Three One G #121 Adam Gnade "After Tonight, Everything Will Be Different" book
- Three One G #122 Netherlands "Kali Corvette" LP
- Three One G #123 Deaf Club "Bad Songs Forever" 7" EP
- Three One G #124 End of the Line "Self-titled" LP
- Three One G #125 The Locust "Safety Second, Body Last" 12" EP
- Three One G #126 Haunted Horses "The Worst Has Finally Happened" LP
- Three One G #127 Microwaves "Discomfiture Atlas" LP
- Three One G #128 Dead Cross "II" LP/ CD
- Three One G #129 Adam Gnade feat. Planet B "Life is the Meatgrinder that Sucks in All Things" cassette
- Three One G #130 The Locust "New Erections" LP
- Three One G #131 Venamoris "Drown In Emotion" LP
- Three One G #132 ADULT. / Planet B "Release Me" single
- Three One G #133 Adam Gnade "The Internet Newspaper" book
- Three One G #134 Fuck Money "Selt titled" cassette EP
- Three One G #135 Squid Pisser "My Tadpole Legion" LP
- Three One G #136 Stress Positions "Harsh Reality" LP
- Three One G #137 Angel Hair "Insect Immorality" LP
- Three One G #138 Nonexistent Night “In The Middle Of A Boiling Sea” LP
- Three One G #139 Adam Gnade "I Wish To Say Lovely Things" book
- Three One G #140 Planet B "Fiction Prediction" LP
- Three One G #141 N8NOFACE/ Planet B con .MS.BOAN 7" EP
- Three One G #142 Deaf Club feat. HIRS Collective / Fuck Money 7" EP
- Three One G #143 Help "Courage" LP
- Three One G #144 Adam Gnade "Your Friends Will Carry You Home" book
- Three One G #145 Haunted Horses "Dweller" LP
- Three One G #146 Justin Pearson "GG Alien and the Mystery Meat" book
- Three One G #147 Unbroken "Fin" 12" EP
- Three One G #148 Venus Twins "/\/\/\/\/" EP
- Three One G #149 The Locust "Peel Sessions" LP
- Three One G #150 Stress Positions "Human Zoo" LP
- Three One G #151 All Leather "Amateur Surgery On Half-Hog Abortion Island" LP
- Three One G #153 Guck "Gucked Up" LP
- Three One G #154 Fuck Money "Self-titled" LP
- Three One G #155 Deaf Club "We Demand A Permanent State Of Happiness" LP
- Three One G #156 Secret Fun Club "Away Team" LP
- Three One G #157 Negative Blast "Destroy Myself For Fun" LP
- Three One G #158 V/A "Cult and Culture Podcast" LP
- Three One G #159 Planet B "Cult and Culture Podcast" Bonus 7" single
- Three One G #160 Adam Gnade "Wild Horse Shit" book

=== Digital Releases ===
- Three One G #Digit1 Leg Lifters "Elle Poupe Dans La Rue" single
- Three One G #Digit2 Leg Lifters "Eat Cake, Lose Weight" single
- Three One G #Digit3 Hot Nerds S/T EP
- Three One G #Digit4 Struggle "One Settler, One Bullet" LP
- Three One G #Digit5 Wet Lungs "Vile Hobbies" EP
- Three One G #Digit6 Adam Gnade featuring Planet B "Locust House excerpt" single
- Three One G #Digit7 Moving Units featuring Justin Pearson "Warsaw" single
- Three One G #Digit8 Doomsday Student "A Jumper's Handbook" LP
- Three One G #Digit9 Doomsday Student "Angry Christmas" single
- Three One G #Digit10 Adam Gnade "Americans" EP
- Three One G #Digit11 Adam Gnade "Greater Mythology Blues" EP
- Three One G #Digit12 Adam Gnade feat. Planet B "Life is the Meatgrinder that Sucks in All Things" single
- Three One G #Digit13 The Chinese Stars "Heaven On Speed Dial" LP
- Three One G #Digit14 Panicker "Blasphony" EP
- Three One G #Digit15 Silent "Prayers For Rain" single
- Three One G #Digit16 Luke Henshaw/ Gabe Serbian "Variations in the Key of the Afterlife"
- Three One G #Digit17 Ssion "Bent" LP
- Three One G #Digit18 Planet B "Bad Girls" single
- Three One G #Digit19 Deaf Club "Contemporary Sickness" remix EP
- Three One G #Digit20 Death Eyes "State of Fear" EP
- Three One G #Digit21 Deaf Club "The Wait" single
- Three One G #Digit22 Satanic Planet "Steve-O Takes a Trip to Satanic Planet" single
- Three One G #Digit23 Sonido De La Frontera "Cumbia Mundial" LP
- Three One G #Digit24 Venamoris "The Gift" single
- Three One G #Digit25 Head Wound City "A New Wave of Violence" LP
- Three One G #Digit26 Venus Twins "/\/\/\/\/" EP
- Three One G #Digit27 Paper Mice "Neurotic City" EP
- Three One G #Digit28 Deaf Club "El Camino Car Crash" single

=== Radio Surgery ===
- Radio Surgery #1 The Locust "Safety Second, Body Last" 12" single
- Radio Surgery #2 The Locust "New Erections" LP
- Radio Surgery #3 The Locust "Peel Sessions" LP
