= A New Wave of Violence =

Studio album by Head Wound City
- Released: May 13, 2016
- Genre: Grindcore, noise rock, mathcore
- Length: 24:11
- Label: Vice Records
- Producer: Ross Robinson

Head Wound City chronology
Head Wound City (2005)	A New Wave of Violence (2016)

Professional ratings
Review scores
Source	Rating
Consequence of Sound	B
Pitchfork	6.9/10
Punknews.org	3.5/5 stars

A New Wave of Violence is the debut album by the hardcore punk supergroup Head Wound City. It was released on May 13, 2016. It was their first release since 2005.

== Track listing ==
No.	Title	Length
1.	"Old Age Takes Too Long"	2:03
2.	"Born to Burn"	1:44
3.	"Head Wound City, USA"	2:04
4.	"I Wanna Be Your Original Sin"	0:54
5.	"I Cast a Shadow for You"	3:18
6.	"Scraper"	2:40
7.	"Closed Casket"	2:11
8.	"Palace of Love and Hate"	1:27
9.	"Avalanche in Heaven"	3:43
10.	"Love is Best"	4:07
Total length:		24:11
