= Zeus! =

Italian progressive-math rock band

- Origin: Italy
- Genres: Progressive rock, math rock, noise rock
- Years active: 2008–present

Zeus! (with an exclamation mark) is an Italian progressive-math rock, supergroup duo formed in 2010 in Imola.

== Biography ==
The band began as a collaboration between Luca Cavina, bassist of Calibro 35, and Paolo Mongardi, former drummer of Jennifer Gentle. In 2010 they released their first self-titled studio album, (involving the labels Bar la Muerte, Shove Records, Escape from Today) almost entirely instrumental, fusing hard sounds to complex lines of composition.

During the years 2009 to 2012 did many concerts around Italy, but also in Germany and France, dividing his time between commitments with their original groups.

In May 2011 was published the first official videoclip of the band, by the song Grindmaster Flesh, from the album Zeus!.

The project is also a strong characterization ironic and irreverent, also reflected by the titles of the songs, and the band's description on the Escape From Today website:

The project started in the summer of '46 with the purpose to completely disrupt the international music scene. After several studio sessions it becomes clear that the recorded material was such hot stuff, to make the all world go boom. The two decided then to hide the master recordings and not to make them public till 3000. ZEUS!' aim is to lavish a golden metal shower till that the masses won't be ready to listen the content of the secret master. For mince lovers.

Members:

Lucallisto III: arciliuto, belcanto, metal zone.

Paolatzinger XVI: mazzuoli, triccheballacche, metal zone.

== Personnel ==
- Luca Cavina (Calibro 35) – bass guitar, voice
- Paolo Mongardi (former member of Jennifer Gentle) – drums

== Discography ==
- 2010 – Zeus! (Smartz Records, Bar La Muerte, SHOVE, Escape From Today, Offset)
- 2013 – Opera (Santeria, Tannen Records, Offset)
- 2015 – Motomonotono (Three One G Records, Tannen Records, Sangue Dischi)

== The Zeus! album ==
Zeus!

Studio album by Zeus!
- Released: 2010
- Genre: Progressive rock, math rock, noise rock

The album is almost entirely instrumental, blending hard sounds with complex progressive compositions; In some songs there is the participation of Enrico Gabrielli of Calibro 35, the group in which plays Luca Cavina.

In May 2011 was published the first official videoclip of the band, of the song Grindmaster Flesh.

=== Track listing ===
1. Suckertorte
2. Grindmaster Flesh
3. Koprofiev
4. Giacomo Leopardi
5. Steve Sylvester Saves
6. Ate U
7. Turbo Pascal
8. Cowboia
9. Golden Metal Shower

== See also ==
- Calibro 35
- Jennifer Gentle
- Progressive rock
- Noise Rock
