= Ex Models =

American post-hardcore band

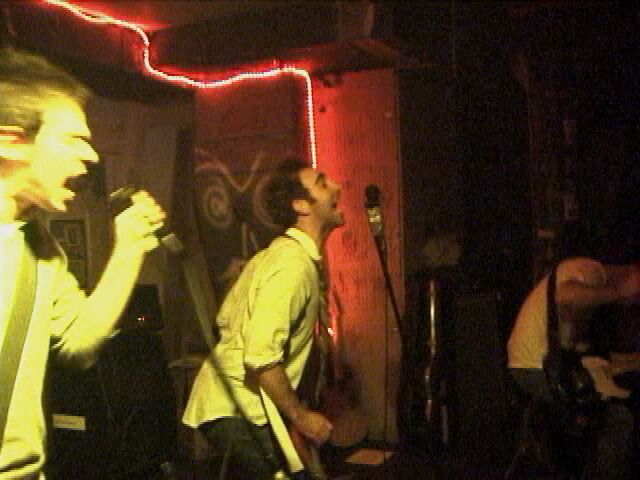
Ex Models 2002 - Shahin Motia, Zach Lehrhoff, Shah Motia

Ex Models is an American no wave-influenced post-hardcore band based in Brooklyn, New York.

== Career ==
The band, based around brothers Shahin and Shahryar Motia, was started while they were in high school. They reunited after college to make their first album, Other Mathematics, released in 2001 on Ace Fu Records. The subject of their lyrics ranges from sex to Jean Baudrillard and his philosophy about simulacra.

Their second album, Zoo Psychology, was released two years later. By this time, bass guitarist Mike Masiello left the band. Zach Lehrhoff replaced him, providing vocals as well.

By 2005, the band had been reduced to the duo of Shahin and Zach and a third album, Chrome Panthers, was released marking a new direction, even more repetitive and minimalist, which the band dubbed "Fundustrial Noise". Contributing on record, and occasionally live, was drummer Kid Millions of Oneida.

In 2007, the 'classic' line-up of both Motias, Zach and drummer Jake Fiedler performed in NYC's East River Park. However, the reunion with Fiedler was short-lived, with the remaining three commencing to play out as Knyfe Hyts, a more metal-oriented outfit.

== Other activities ==
Ex Models are active in the Brooklyn music scene and are also in side bands. Shahin has played with The First Lady Of Cuntry and the Cunts and Zach in The Seconds, Pterodactyl, and with Marnie Stern. In 2010, Shahin was a member of Oneida.

== Members ==
- Shahin Motia - vocals/guitar
- Zach Lehrhoff - vocals/bass guitar or guitar
- Shahryar Motia - guitar
- Jake Fiedler - drums

=== Former ===
- Mike Masiello - bass guitar
- Kid Millions - drums (guest)

== Discography ==
Albums

- Other Mathematics (2001, Ace Fu Records)
- Zoo Psychology (2003, Frenchkiss Records)
- Chrome Panthers (2005, Troubleman Unlimited)

Splits, compilations, LPs

- This Is Next Year: A Brooklyn-Based Compilation (2001, Arena Rock Recording Co.)
- U.S. Pop Life Vol. 13 Northeast New Core (2001, Contact Records) (Japan Only)
- Ex Models/The Seconds Pink EP (2002, My Pal God Records)
- Raw Wild Love 7-inch (2002, X-Mist Records)
- Sonik Mook Experiment Vol. 3: HOT SHIT (2003 Mute/Blast First)
- Zoo Psychology LP (2003, X-Mist Records)
- Ex Models/Holy Molar split 7-inch EP (2004, Three One G)
- Chrome Panthers LP (European Edition) (2005, X-Mist)
