= Head Wound City =

American hardcore punk supergroup

- Genres: Hardcore punk; post-hardcore; grindcore; screamo; thrashcore
- Years active: 2005; 2014–2016
- Labels: Three One G; Vice
- Past members: Jordan Blilie; Nick Zinner; Cody Votolato; Justin Pearson; Gabe Serbian
- Website: headwoundcity.com

Head Wound City was an American hardcore punk supergroup consisting of Jordan Blilie and Cody Votolato both of The Blood Brothers, Nick Zinner of the Yeah Yeah Yeahs, and Justin Pearson and Gabe Serbian, both of The Locust.

== History ==
=== Formation, debut EP, and hiatus (2005) ===
Guitarist Nick Zinner said "The idea started in London after Blood Brothers played with Yeah Yeah Yeahs" he followed up to say "Jordan [Blilie] and I were talking about Violent Ramp, the skate thrash band that some dudes from Wolf Eyes do, and we thought it would be really fun to do one ourselves. We drunk dialed [Justin Pearson] and said he and Gabe [Serbian] were in our band." Guitarist Cody Votolato backs this claim saying "We wanted to play music together and we had the chance to do it. There was really no other motivation than to play music with friends." Zinner went on to says he was surprised when the band actually happened.

In 2005 the band played their first and only show in San Diego. On November 8, 2005, Head Wound City released their debut EP, Head Wound City, through Pearson's own label Three One G. The EP was written, recorded and produced the span of one week. The band remained inactive after the release of the EP. In regards to the future of the band Three One G's website states "The band has been left open-ended over the years, and members are optimistic about creating new material in the future."

=== Reunion and A New Wave of Violence (2014–2016) ===
On September 20, 2014, the band reunited and played their first show in nearly eight years at BedRocktoberfest in Bedrock in Los Angeles, it is also their second show ever as a band. The band reportedly performed two new songs, which were dubbed "nu 1" and "nu 2" on the band's setlist. In January 2015, the band announced that their self-titled 2005 EP will be remastered and reissued on March 10 via Three One G. The EP's press release notes state that the "members are optimistic about creating new material in the future". In February 2016, Head Wound City announced they were releasing a new album titled, A New Wave of Violence. Also in February 2016 the band released the single "Scraper". In March 2016 the band released the single "Born To Burn". The album was released on May 13, 2016, through Vice Records. The album was produced by Ross Robinson and was written over the course of a week in January 2015. The album is named after a 1982 Raymond Pettibon magazine.

== Musical style ==
Their music has been described as hardcore punk, post-hardcore, and thrashcore. The band has also been referred to as part of "a generation of bands that expanded the boundaries of post-hardcore, screamo and grindcore." Their sound consists of rapid-fire bursts of noise and screams, or as vocalist Jordan Billie puts it, "It's kind of like if Alien and Predator started a band instead of fighting each other." Their songs are typically quite short in length, with the band's EP running less than 10 minutes in seven songs.

== Band members ==
- Jordan Blilie – vocals
- Nick Zinner – lead guitar
- Cody Votolato – rhythm guitar
- Justin Pearson – bass
- Gabe Serbian – drums (died 2022)

== Discography ==
Studio albums

Title	Album details
A New Wave of Violence	Released: May 13, 2016; Label: Vice; Formats: LP

EPs

Title	EP details
Head Wound City	Released: November 8, 2005; Label: Three One G; Formats: CD, 10", 12"

Singles

Title	Year	Album
"Scraper"	2016	A New Wave of Violence
"Born To Burn"	2016	A New Wave of Violence
"Just One Fix"	2016	Non-album single
