= Gabe Serbian =

American musician (1977–2022)

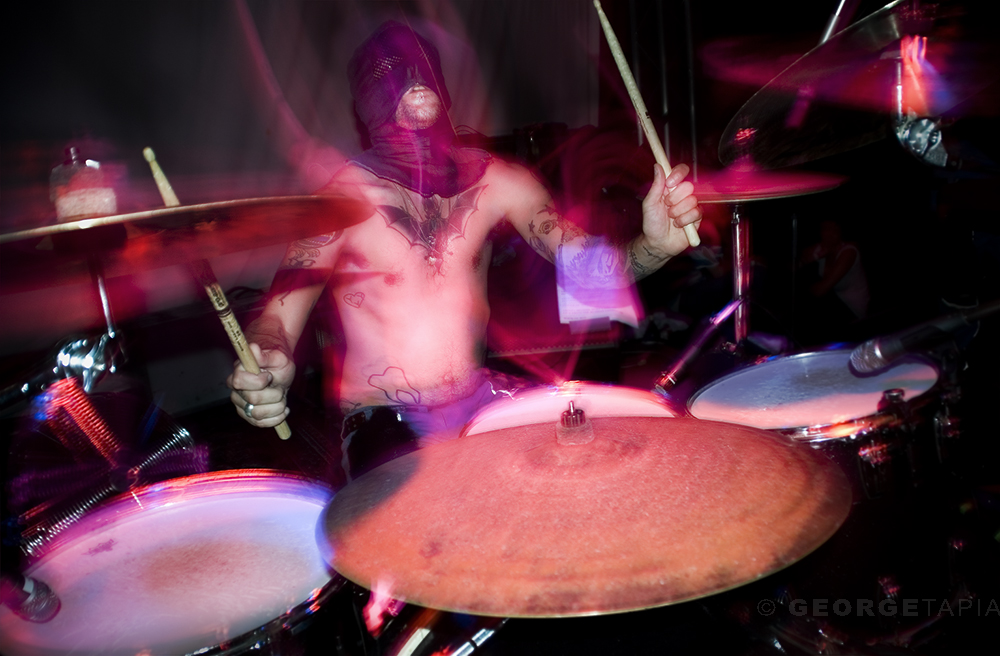
- Serbian with The Locust in 2007

Background information
- Born: May 1, 1977; San Diego, Ca
- Died: April 29, 2022 (aged 44)
- Genres: Hardcore punk; grindcore; goregrind; noise rock
- Occupation: Musician
- Instruments: Drums; guitar; vocals

Gabriel Serbian (May 1, 1977 – April 30, 2022) was an American drummer and guitarist, most famous for his work in The Locust, Cattle Decapitation, Holy Molar and Zu. He was also a member of Head Wound City, a hardcore/punk rock supergroup.

He performed with Alec Empire, Nic Endo, Charlie Clouser, and Merzbow, and drummed for Otto von Schirach on a European tour and also when von Schirach played/toured with The Locust.

Serbian was praised by Dave Lombardo of Slayer, who said that "There's a band called The Locust. Their drummer is named Gabe Serbian, and their music hits me now like D.R.I. hit me in the early '80s".

Serbian died on April 29, 2022, aged 44.
