= Cold Cave =

American electronic music project

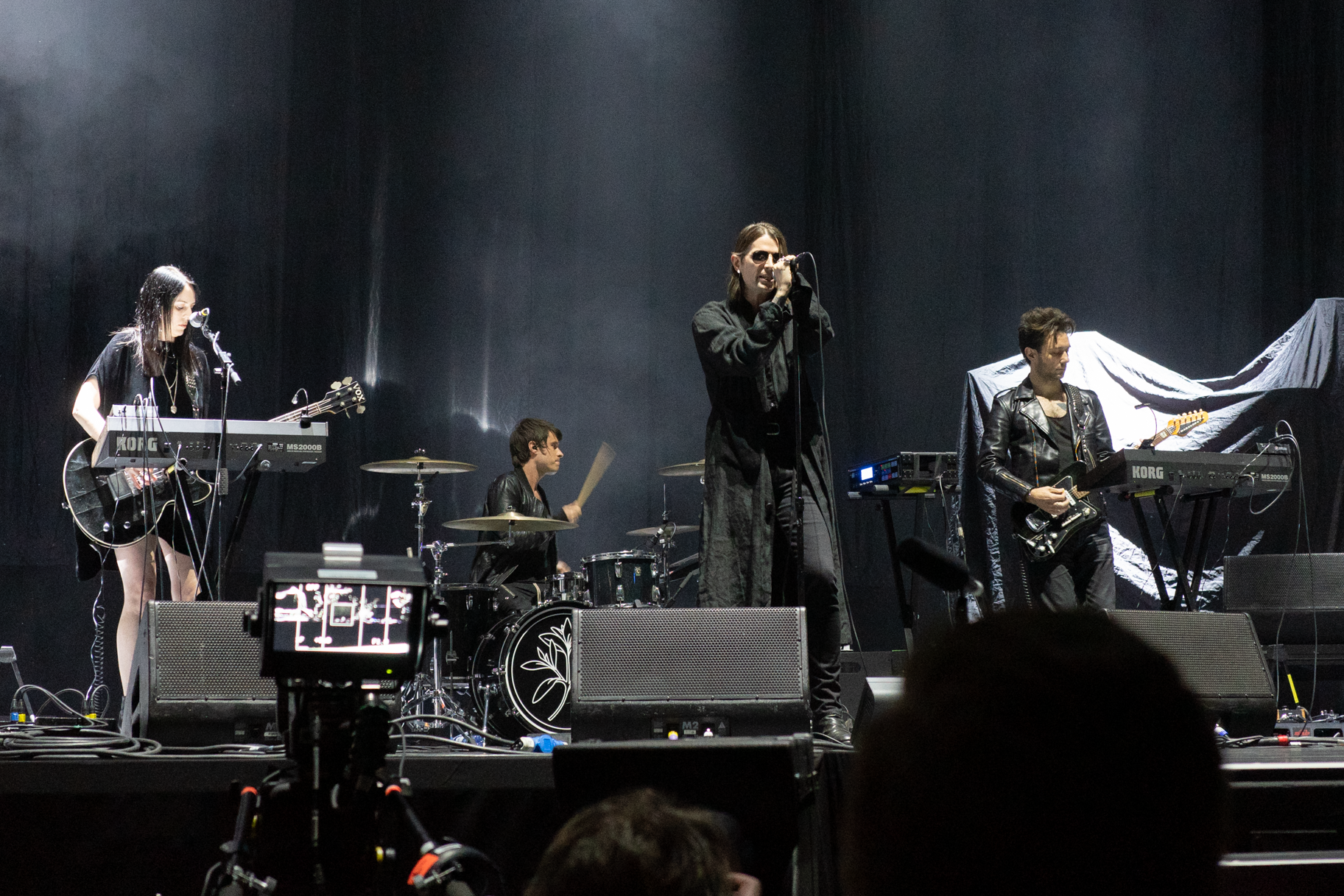
- Cold Cave performing live in May 2023

Background information
- Origin: Los Angeles, California, U.S.
- Genres: Synth-pop; dark wave; cold wave
- Years active: 2007–present
- Labels: Dais; Hospital Productions; What's Your Rupture?; Heartworm Press; Big Love; Matador; Arts & Crafts México
- Members: Wesley Eisold
- Website: coldcave.net

Cold Cave is the solo electronic music project of musician Wesley Eisold. Founded in 2007, Cold Cave has issued three studio albums and seven EPs, among other releases. Contributors to the project have included Caralee McElroy, Dominick Fernow, and Jennifer Clavin.

Cold Cave has supported acts such as Gary Numan, Nine Inch Nails, and The Jesus and Mary Chain.

== History ==
=== Formation ===
Cold Cave was founded in 2007 by Wesley Eisold, vocalist of hardcore groups American Nightmare (briefly known as Give Up the Ghost), Some Girls, and Heartworm Press founder. Cold Cave represents Eisold's first venture into instrumentation. Eisold was born with one hand which led him to electronic music.

=== Love Comes Close (2007–2010) ===
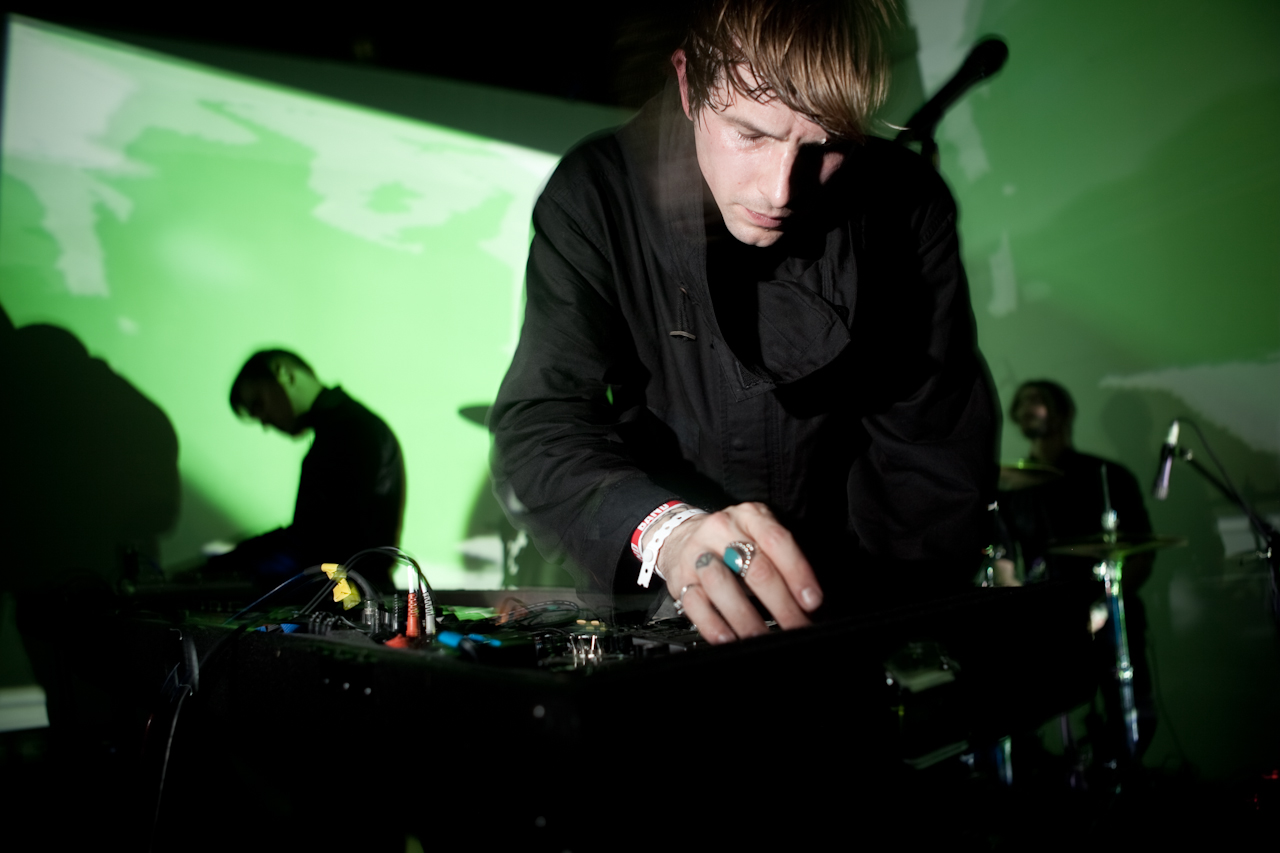
Eisold performing live as Cold Cave in 2011

After initial releases on Dais Records, Hospital Productions, What's Your Rupture?, and Eisold's own Heartworm Press, he signed to Matador Records, who re-released his self-released debut album, Love Comes Close, on November 3, 2009.

=== Cherish the Light Years (2011–2012) ===
In April 2011, Matador Records released his second album, Cherish the Light Years.

In July 2011, Cold Cave remixed "I Didn't See It Coming" by the band Belle and Sebastian. The song appeared on their 12-inch single "Come On Sister" released by Matador Records and Rough Trade Records.

In April 2012, Cold Cave performed at the Solomon R. Guggenheim Museum between John Chamberlain sculptures as part of the museum's Divine Ricochet series.

In October 2012, Cold Cave performed at the Getty Center.

=== Singles series and Full Cold Moon (2012–present) ===
In September 2012, Eisold announced Cold Cave would be touring the US later in the year, he would be recording a new album, and that the new live lineup included: Hunter Burgan (AFI), London May (Samhain), Jessie Nelson, and Cody Votolato (The Blood Brothers). This lineup was exclusive to this two-and-a-half-week tour and Eisold said performing with a full band was something that failed to materialize during Cherish the Light Years tours. While continuing to work on a follow-up to Cherish the Light Years and not under contract with a label, Eisold began independently releasing a series of stand-alone singles. Eisold wrote and recorded these new songs by himself similar to how songs on Cremations and Love Comes Close were crafted. He said they were created "by myself, at a desk in my apartment. It was freeing and exciting in a way because I didn't owe anyone an album. I got to just make them to make them. The songs were minimal, honest, electronic and without help."

The first single in the series was "A Little Death to Laugh." The single was released in October 2012 through Heartworm and a music video for the song was released in March 2013. In 2013, Eisold released "Oceans with No End" (through Jacob Bannon's Deathwish Inc.), "God Made the World" and "Black Boots", for which Slava Tsukerman, known for his 1982 film Liquid Sky, directed a music video. In October 2013, Cold Cave released a digital-only, fifth stand-alone single titled "Nausea, The Earth and Me."

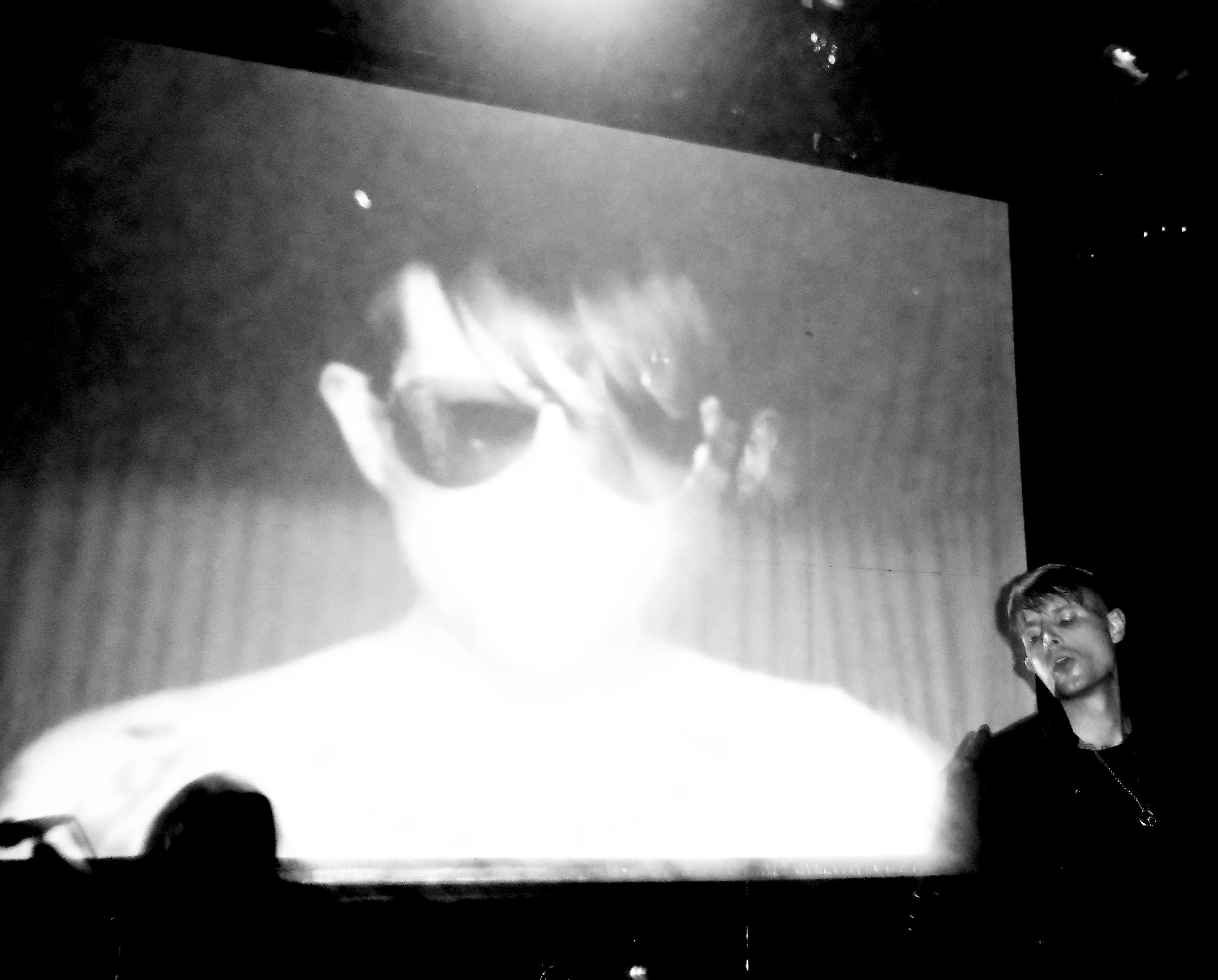
Eisold performing as Cold Cave in 2013

On February 21, 2013, Eisold announced that Justin Benoit, a former live contributor to Cold Cave, had died.

In support of the new singles, Cold Cave embarked on an extensive tour of Asia, performing in Japan, South Korea, China, Thailand, Nepal, and Hong Kong in April 2013; performed live with industrial/noise pioneer Boyd Rice in mid-2013; toured with synthpop artist Gary Numan in September 2013; and toured with Nitzer Ebb frontman Douglas McCarthy in October 2013. In January 2014, Cold Cave remixed the song "Running" by Nine Inch Nails as part of a remix EP Seed Eight, to coincide with the launch of Beats Music. In May 2014, Cold Cave opened for Nine Inch Nails on their full European and UK tour. They were also invited to open for Nine Inch Nails and Soundgarden on their North American tour, after Death Grips, the band originally chosen for opening, decided to split.

Cold Cave began working on its third studio album and follow up to Cherish the Light Years tentatively titled Sunflower in 2013, and a release date in 2014 was originally anticipated. On what the potential sonic direction of the new album, Eisold said it would be a "mix between some of the bigger sounds on Cherish and more minimal stuff I'm interested in now, like Suicide or 39 Clocks." However tours in support of Full Cold Moon and the 2012–2013 singles series proved to be more fruitful than anticipated, and as a result, work on Sunflower was put on hold.

In June 2015, Cold Cave performed at the wedding of Tony Hawk and Catherine Goodman at the Adare Manor in Ireland. Cold Cave would be featured on the soundtrack for Tony Hawk's Pro Skater 5 later that year, and two of their songs were selected by Hawk for inclusion on 2018's Tony Hawk's Skate Jam.

In mid-February 2016, a single called "Nothing Is True But You" was released. In Spring, Max G. Morton, who played keyboards for a short portion of the band's early days and also collaborated with Eisold on prose and publishing via the singer's own Heartworm Press, rejoined the band. At end of August 2016, the band shared another single, an almost cacophonic track called "The Idea of Love". In September, they embarked on a domestic mini-tour together with dark electropop act TR/ST.

In late September 2017, Cold Cave released a single called "Glory". The video accompanying the track revealed a full live band featuring, besides the ever-present Eisold and Amy Lee, steady touring member Max G. Morton, Nils Bue (bass/guitar) and Ryan McMahon (drums). The band kicked off a small US tour before heading to Europe to support The Jesus and Mary Chain until mid-October.

In early April 2018, the band premiered another song, "You & Me & Infinity", and announced a 26-date North American Spring tour with Choir Boy and Black Marble. At the end of the month, a new EP bearing the title of their latest single was made available digitally. In November of the same year the band headed overseas for a string of selected European dates, again with support from Choir Boy.

On April 12, 2023, it was announced that Cold Cave will tour in support of Depeche Mode's "Memento Mori" World Tour and will be at the following European dates and cities: May 16 & 18 in Amsterdam, Netherlands. May 20 in Antwerp, Belgium. May 23 in Stockholm, Sweden. May 26 in Leipzig, Germany. May 28 in Bratislava, Slovakia.

In March 2025, the band was featured on vocals on a track called "So Then..." on a new album released by Chris Liebing.

== Style ==
The Chicago Sun-Times wrote that Cold Cave "takes mid-'80s synth pop (New Order, OMD) and moves it forward — just beyond the reach of nostalgia... scratching it up, getting it dirty, just around the edges." Journalists have drawn further comparisons to Joy Division, the Sisters of Mercy, and Nine Inch Nails. Cold Cave has also been associated with the dark wave and noise music genres.

== Contributors ==
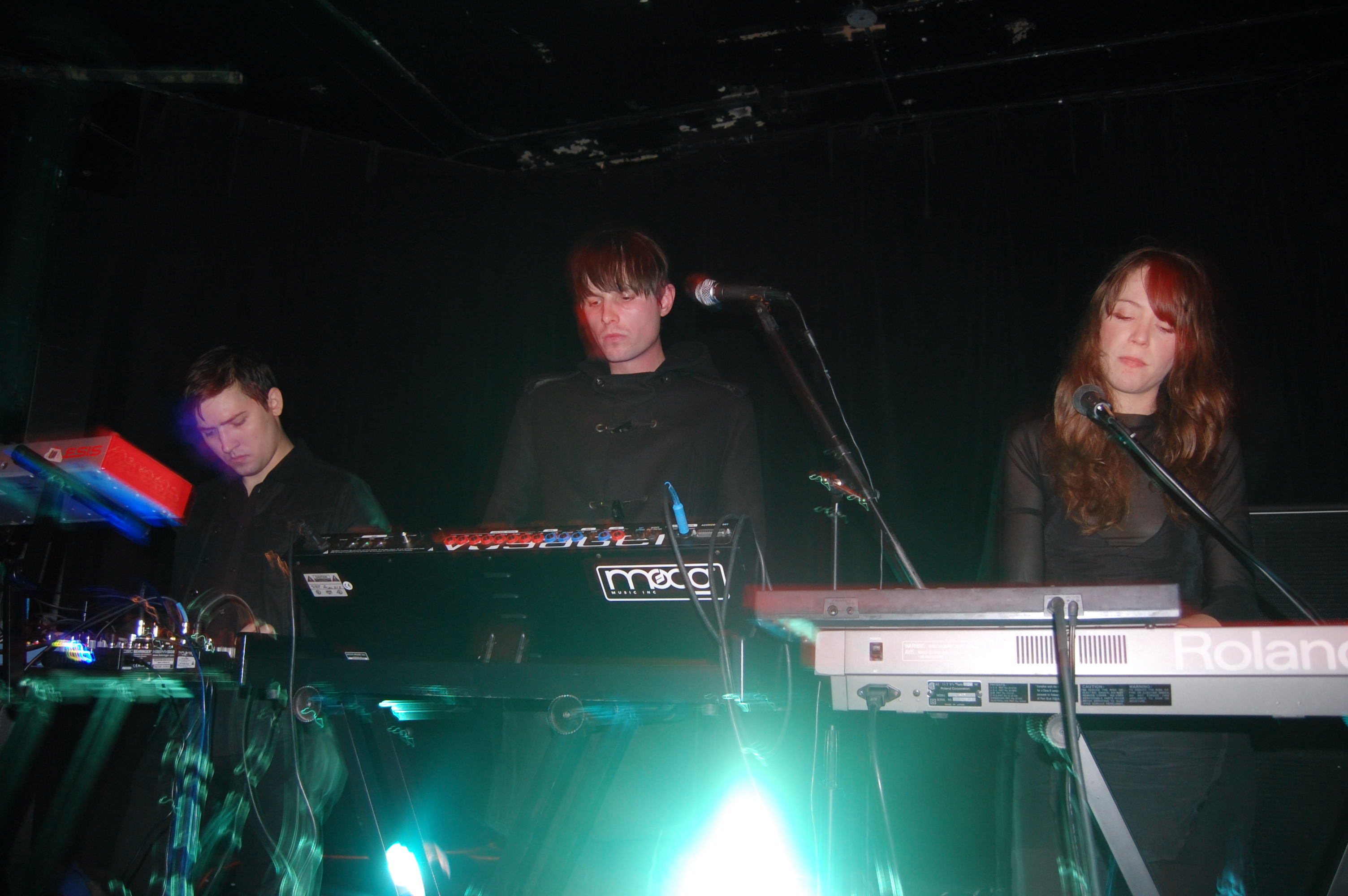
Cold Cave lineup in 2009: Dominick Fernow, Wesley Eisold and Caralee McElroy

Cold Cave is essentially a solo project by former Give Up the Ghost and Some Girls frontman Wesley Eisold. While there have been other people contributing to Cold Cave either on tour or in the studio since its conception, Eisold doesn't consider any of them to be official band members. On the subject of band members, Eisold said in an interview, "I struggle with the word 'member' because there are no 'members' of Cold Cave. It's just me. I've collaborated with many people. Some were extremely worthwhile and others were extremely worthless, and I've come to the point where I'm more comfortable doing things by myself."

=== List of contributors ===
Name	Related act(s)	Years active	Notes	Ref(s)
Caralee McElroy	Xiu Xiu	2009–2010		
Sean Martin	Hatebreed	2009	Performed guitars and bass on three tracks on Love Comes Close.	
Justin Benoit		2009–2010	Live keyboardist during supporting tours for Love Comes Close and performed on Cold Cave's split with Prurient, Stars Explode. Benoit died in February 2013.	
Dominick Fernow	Prurient	2009–2011	Live keyboardist 2009–2011	
Jennifer Clavin	Bleached, Mika Miko	2010-2011	Vocals and samplers	
Amy Lee		2012–present	Cold Cave live performer, photographer, videographer, and designer.	
Anthony Anzaldo	Ceremony	2019–present	Live guitarist	

== Discography ==
Studio albums

- Love Comes Close (2009, Heartworm)
- Cherish the Light Years (2011, Matador)
- Passion Depression (2024, Heartworm)

Compilations

- Cremations (2009, Hospital)
- Full Cold Moon (2014, Heartworm)

EPs

- Coma Potion (2008, Heartworm)
- Painted Nails (2008, Hospital)
- Electronic Dreams (2009, Heartworm)
- Easel and Ruby (2009, What's Your Rupture?)
- The Laurels (2009, Big Love Records)
- Death Comes Close (2009, Matador)
- Stars Explode (split with Prurient) (2010, Hospital)
- Life Magazine Remixes (2010, Matador)
- New Morale Leadership (2010, Hospital)
- Rebellion Is Over (collaboration with Genesis P-Orridge and Black Rain) (2015, Heartworm Press/Dais Records)
- You & Me & Infinity (2018, Heartworm Press)
- Fate in Seven Lessons (2021, Heartworm)

Singles

Year	Song	Album
2008	"The Trees Grew Emotions and Died"	Love Comes Close
2009	"Love Comes Close"	Love Comes Close
2010	"Life Magazine"	Love Comes Close
2011	"The Great Pan is Dead"	Cherish the Light Years
2011	"Villains of the Moon"	Cherish the Light Years
2012	"Confetti" / "Believe in my Blood"	Cherish the Light Years
2012	"A Little Death to Laugh"	n/a
2013	"Oceans with No End"	n/a
2013	"God Made the World"	n/a
2013	"Black Boots"	n/a
2013	"Nausea, The Earth and Me"	n/a
2015	"Doom, Doom, Doom"	n/a
2016	"Nothing Is True But You"	You & Me & Infinity EP
2016	"The Idea of Love"	n/a
2017	"Glory"	You & Me & Infinity EP
2018	"You & Me & Infinity"	You & Me & Infinity EP
2019	"Promised Land"	Fate in Seven Lessons
2021	"Night Light"	Fate in Seven Lessons
2021	"Prayer from Nowhere"	Fate in Seven Lessons
2021	"Psalm 23"	Fate in Seven Lessons

Music videos

Year	Video	Album
2009	"Love Comes Close"	Love Comes Close
2010	"Life Magazine"	Love Comes Close
2011	"Villains of the Moon"	Cherish the Light Years
2013	"A Little Death to Laugh"	n/a
2013	"Black Boots"	n/a
2016	"The Idea of Love"	n/a
2017	"Glory"	You & Me & Infinity EP
2018	"You & Me & Infinity"	You & Me & Infinity EP
2019	"Promised Land"	Fate in Seven Lessons
2021	"Night Light"	Fate in Seven Lessons
2021	"Prayer from Nowhere"	Fate in Seven Lessons
2021	"Psalm 23"	Fate in Seven Lessons
