= Hard to Kill (disambiguation) =

Hard to Kill is a 1990 American action film starring Steven Seagal.

Hard to Kill may also refer to:

== Film, TV, and events ==
- Hard to Kill, a 2018 Discovery Channel show hosted by Tim Kennedy
- Dynamite (1949 film), an American drama originally called Hard To Kill
- Impact Wrestling Hard To Kill, an annual professional wrestling event
  - Hard To Kill (2020), the first event
  - Hard To Kill (2021), the second event
  - Hard To Kill (2022), the third event
- Easy Money II: Hard to Kill, a 2012 Swedish thriller film

== Music ==
=== Albums ===
- Hard to Kill (Gucci Mane album), 2006
- Hard To Kill (Raging Speedhorn album), 2020
- Hard to Kill, a 2007 album by Australian hip hop artist Vents
- Hard to Kill, a 2014 album by American blues musician Lynwood Slim

=== Songs ===
- "Hard To Kill", a song on the 1992 album Runaway Slave by American hip hop duo Showbiz and A.G.
- "Hard to Kill", a 2007 single by American rapper Uncle Murda
- "Hard to Kill", a song on the 2010 album Return of the Devil's Son by American rapper Big
- "Hard to Kill", a 2019 single on the album Don't You Think You've Had Enough? by American punk rock band Bleached

== See also ==
- Hard Kill, a 2020 American action film
