= Wesley Eisold =

American musician, poet and author

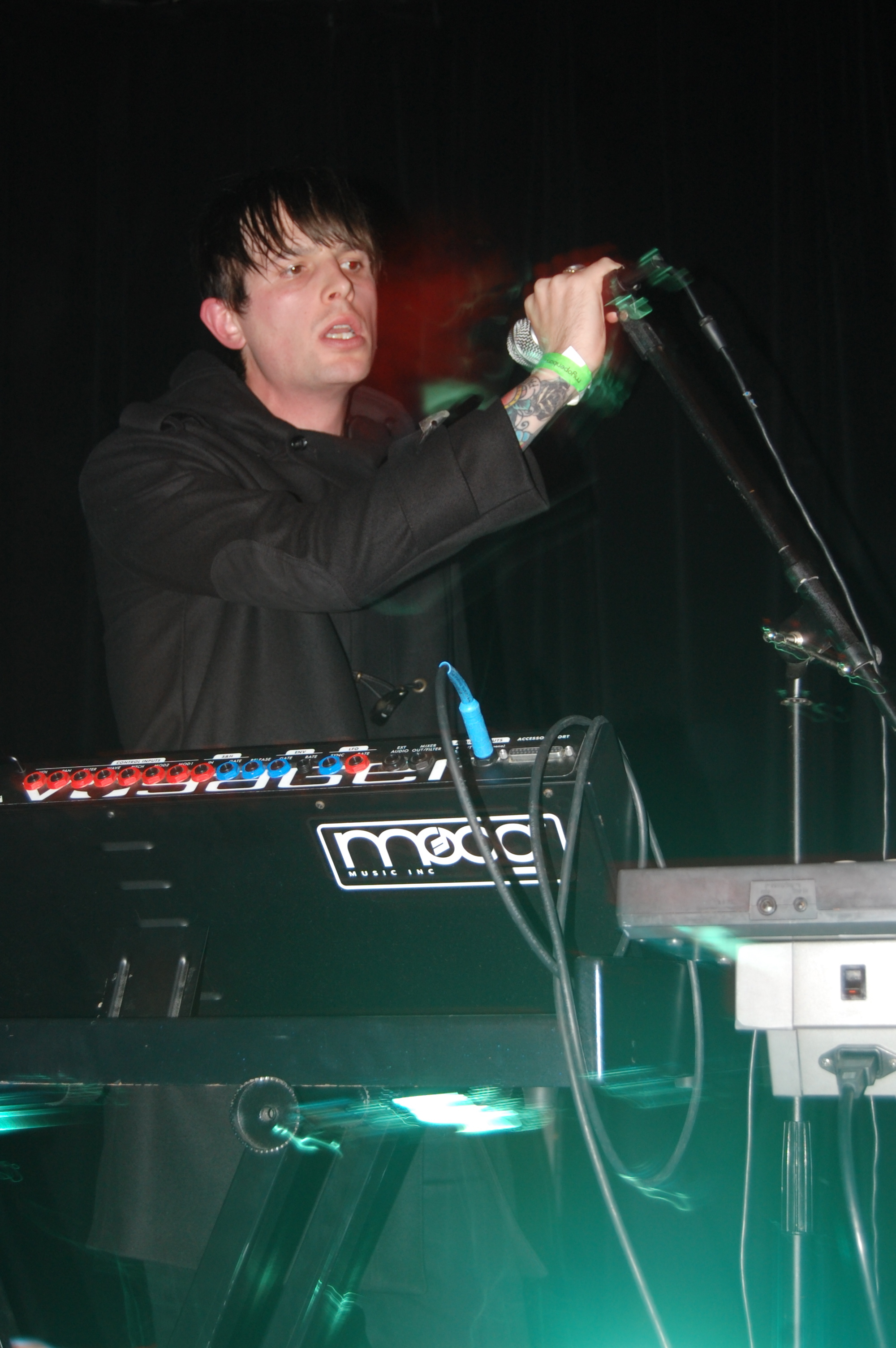
- Eisold in 2009

Background information
- Born: February 15, 1979 (age 47); Virginia Beach, Virginia
- Genres: Hardcore punk; grindcore; synth-pop; dark wave
- Occupations: Singer; songwriter; musician; poet
- Instruments: Vocals; synthesizer
- Years active: 1995–present
- Labels: Bridge 9; Deathwish; Epitaph; Equal Vision; Heartworm; Matador; Three One G

Wesley Eisold (born February 15, 1979) is an American musician, poet and author. He records music under the name Cold Cave, and runs the publishing house Heartworm Press.

== Career ==
Wesley Eisold is the vocalist of the synthpop darkwave band Cold Cave as well as the hardcore punk group American Nightmare from 1998 - 2004, 2010–present, and previously of Some Girls, XO Skeletons and Ye Olde Maids.

In 2006, Eisold was published in the Columbia Journal. Also in 2006, Eisold founded the independent publishing company, Heartworm Press, because of his interest in writing and bringing zines to shows. He listed Exact Change, Grove Press, 2.13.61 and New Directions Publishing as influential publishers. Heartworm has released Eisold's own writing, as well as Boyd Rice, Eric Paul, Jonathan Shaw, Genesis P-Orridge and Richard Brautigan. In August 2007, he published his first collection of poems and prose, Deathbeds in his own publishing company Heartworms.

Since 2007 Eisold has been performing his music under the name Cold Cave, which represents his first venture into instrumentation. Eisold was born with one hand which led him to electronic music. After a public row over alleged plagiarism, Eisold settled out of court and has been given songwriting credits for Fall Out Boy's songs "The Carpal Tunnel of Love", "Golden", and "Bang the Doldrums" from the album Infinity on High. On Fall Out Boy's 2005 album, From Under the Cork Tree, Eisold is credited as 'Inspirador.

In 2009, the Guardian wrote "Wesley Eisold is an absolutely new, young god of nihilism and despair – he brilliantly captures Cold Cave's aesthetic: the Morrissey of How Soon Is Now wailing over Nitzer Ebb beats and New Order melodies."

In 2010 Eisold said in an interview that missing a hand ruled out playing guitar and drums as instruments, so he began to try "making music with synths and pedals". He also noted that his songwriting process had changed after removing himself from the traditional band scene, and writing alone by himself.

In 2011 and 2012, Eisold performed live as a member of Prurient.

He has performed in less traditional music venues such as the Solomon R. Guggenheim Museum and the Getty Center.

=== Collaborations ===
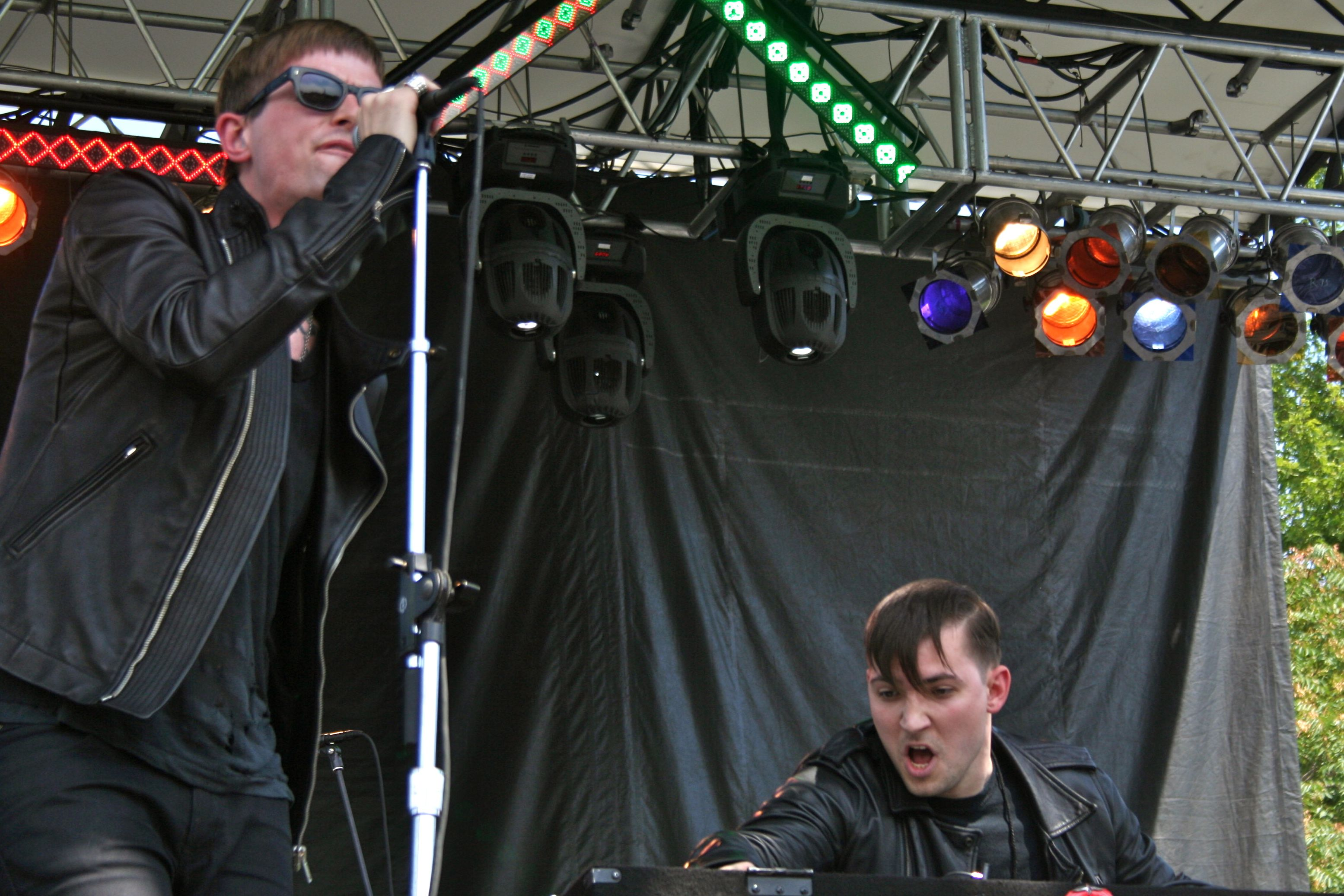
Eisold (left) performing as Cold Cave with Dominick Fernow in 2011

Eisold published Eric Paul of Arab On Radar's 2008 poetry collection, I Offered Myself As The Sea. He has worked with Genesis P-Orridge, Jonathan Shaw, Chris Leo, and Max G. Morton. Eisold produced and recorded songs on Boyd Rice's 2012 album, Back To Mono, released on Mute Records. Several Cold Cave appearances were cancelled, because of Boyd Rice's controversial ties to Nazism, Satanism, and accusations of misogyny. They collaborated live in 2013.

In 2014, Eisold collaborated with Russian/American fashion designer Alexandre Plokhov on a shirt design for his Fall/Winter 2014 collection.

Also in 2014, Eisold collaborated with techno musician Black Asteroid and fashion designer Rick Owens on the Black Asteroid release and video of the song 'Black Moon.'

In 2015, Eisold collaborated with Genesis Breyer P-Orridge of Throbbing Gristle and Psychic TV on a recording entitled 'Rebellion Is Over.'

== Personal life ==
Eisold's father is Daine Eisold, a retired United States Naval Officer. Eisold has said in 2013 that he has been an outsider and had depression all his life. His partner Amy Lee has been playing the synthesizer alongside him since 2012. They live in Los Angeles and have a son named Rainer Lee Eisold, born November 20, 2015.

== Lawsuit ==
In September 2024, it was reported that Eisold have filed a lawsuit against professional wrestling promotion WWE, professional wrestler Cody Runnels (who wrestles as Cody Rhodes) and online merchandise retailer Fanatics over the "American Nightmare" name and trademark on merchandise. Eisold has held the "American Nightmare" clothing, music and entertainment services trademark since 2016. In 2019, Eisold agreed with Runnels on using the nickname after the latter tried to file a trademark on it. In 2021, Eisold and Runnels entered into an agreement that allowed Runnels to use the trademark so long as the trademark prominently featured Runnels' name, likeness and association with wrestling. In the lawsuit, Eisold claims that WWE, Runnels and Fanatics have violated the agreement by selling merchandise bearing the "American Nightmare" name with little to no reference to Runnels as a wrestler. Eisold also cites confusion in the marketplace by saying that some wear Runnels' merchandise to his band's concerts and that his band is regularly tagged on social media in stories about Runnels. Eisold is seeking at least $150,000 in damages and treble damages of up to $300,000 for federal trademark infringement, in addition to attorneys' expenses.

== Discography ==
- American Nightmare/Give Up the Ghost - 4 Song Demo Tape/7" (2000) - Self Released/Malfunction
- American Nightmare - S/T 7-inch (2000) - Bridge 9 Records
- American Nightmare - The Sun Isn't Getting Any Brighter 7-inch (2001) - Bridge 9 Records
- American Nightmare/Give Up the Ghost - Background Music CD/LP (2001) - Equal Vision Records
- American Nightmare - Black on Black: A Tribute to Black Flag (song: Depression) (2002) - Initial
- American Nightmare - Love American Demos 2002-2003 - Unreleased
- American Nightmare - American Nightmare (2018, Rise Records)
- American Nightmare - Dedicated To The Next World 10" (2023) - Heartworm Press
- Anti Aquarian - Chrome Jesus Cassette (2010) - Hospital Productions
- Cold Cave - Coma Potion 12-inch (2008) - Heartworm Press
- Cold Cave - The Trees Grew Emotions And Died 12-inch(2008) - Dais Records
- Cold Cave - Painted Nails 7-inch (2008) - Hospital Productions
- Cold Cave - Blessure Grave/Crocodile 3-way split 7-inch (2008) - Down In The Ground
- Cold Cave - Electronic Dreams Cassette (2009) - Heartworm Press
- Cold Cave - Cremations CD/12-inch (2009) - Hospital Productions
- Cold Cave - New Morale Leadership Cassette (2010) - Hospital Productions
- Cold Cave - Prurient Collaboration - Stars explode Cassette/12" (2009) - Hospital Productions
- Cold Cave - Easel and Ruby 12-inch Single (2009) - What's Your Rupture?
- Cold Cave - Love Comes Close CD/12" (2009) - Heartworm Press
- Cold Cave - The Laurels 12-inch Single (2009) - Big Love
- Cold Cave - Death Comes Close 12-inch (2009) - Matador Records
- Cold Cave - Love Comes Close 12-inch Re-Press (2009) - Matador Records
- Cold Cave - Cherish the Light Years (2011) - Matador Records
- Cold Cave - A Little Death to Laugh 7-inch (2012) - Heartworm Press
- Cold Cave - Oceans With No End 7-inch (2013) - Deathwish
- Cold Cave - Black Boots 7-inch (2013) - Heartworm Press
- Cold Cave - God Made the World 7-inch (2013) - Heartworm Press
- Cold Cave - Nausea, the Earth and Me- Digital Single (2013) - Heartworm Press
- Cold Cave - Full Cold Moon CD (2014) - Heartworm Press
- Cold Cave - Rebellion Is Over (2015) - Heartworm Press / Dais Records
- Cold Cave - Nothing Is True But You 7-inch (2015) - Heartworm Press
- Cold Cave - The Idea of Love 7-inch (2016) - Heartworm Press
- Cold Cave - You & Me & Infinity 10-inch (2018) - Heartworm Press
- Cold Cave - Fate In Seven Lessons (album) (2021) - Heartworm Press
- Cold Cave - Passion Depression (album) (2024) - Heartworm Press
- Give Up the Ghost - Love American CD-EP (2003) - Bridge 9 Records/Equal Vision Records
- Give Up the Ghost - We're Down Til We're Underground CD/LP (2003) - Equal Vision
- Give Up the Ghost - Live in London 7-inch (2003) - Bridge 9 Records
- Give Up the Ghost - Year One CD/2×7″ (2004) - Reflections Records/Bridge 9 Records
- Some Girls - "We'll Let You Know" demo (2002)- Self Released
- Some Girls - The Rains EP EP (2002)- Deathwish
- Some Girls - The Blues EP EP (2002)- Deathwish
- Some Girls - All My Friends Are Going Death CD/LP (2003)- Deathwish/Three One G
- Some Girls - The DNA Will Have Its Say EP (2005)- Three One G
- Some Girls - Heaven's Pregnant Teens CD/LP (2006)- Epitaph/Three One G
- Some Girls - BBC Session
- Taylor Bow - Thin Air LP (2009)- Youth Attack!
- XO Skeletons - Live From Planet Death (demo) (2005) - Heartworm Press
- XO Skeletons - Asthmagasm EP (2006) - Malfunction
- XO Skeletons - Bored By Heaven Digital/12" (2008) - self-released
- Ye Olde Maids - s/t Cassette (2007) - Heartworm Press
- Ye Olde Maids contributed a track to Nihil Underground's "Decades of Decay" noise/power electronics compilation.
- Ye Olde Maids - God Blesses Us, Mother Dresses Us 12-inch (2009) - Art Fag
