= Full Cold Moon =

Compilation album by Cold Cave
- Released: May 13, 2014
- Genre: Synth-pop; dark wave; post-punk; gothic rock
- Label: Heartworm
- Producer: Wesley Eisold

Cold Cave chronology
Cherish the Light Years (2011)	Full Cold Moon (2014)	Rebellion Is Over (2015)

Full Cold Moon is a compilation album by Cold Cave. It was released on May 13, 2014, through project leader Wesley Eisold's own record label, Heartworm Press. The album features the band's limited edition singles that were released through Heartworm Press and Deathwish, Inc., in chronological order. The release of the album was announced on April 21, 2014, through Cold Cave's official Instagram page.

== Critical reception ==
Professional ratings
Review scores
Source	Rating
Pitchfork	(6.8/10)
PopMatters	7/10

Ian Cohen of Pitchfork wrote that "the album collects the singles to create an account of the imperfect progress of someone trying to take back control of his life." He also stated: "Full Cold Moon is more honest in the sense that Eisold is asking himself harder questions than he did on songs like 'Underworld USA'," while also further adding that the listeners' appreciation for the album "would be inversely proportional to their appreciation of Cherish the Light Years." PopMatters critic John Paul stated: "Spanning the whole of his stylistic spectrum under the Cold Cave guise, Full Cold Moon could well serve as an abbreviated retrospective of sorts, pulling in his minimalist darkwave experiments alongside his more overtly synth-pop compositions." The Quietus' Chad Parkhill commented: ". Even if Full Cold Moon transpires to keep the real Wesley Eisold still hidden from his audience, it seems as though he finally knows who he (and by extension Cold Cave) is."

== Track listing ==
All songs written by Wesley Eisold.

1. "A Little Death to Laugh"
2. "Young Prisoner Dreams of Romance"
3. "Tristan Corbière"
4. "Oceans with No End"
5. "People Are Poison"
6. "Black Boots"
7. "Meaningful Life"
8. "God Made the World"
9. "Dandelion"
10. "Nausea, the Earth and Me"
11. "Don't Blow Up the Moon"
12. "Beaten 1979"

== Personnel ==
Cold Cave

- Wesley Eisold - writing, performance, recording
