= Fate in Seven Lessons =

EP by Cold Cave
- Released: June 11, 2021
- Recorded: October–November 2020
- Genre: Synth-pop; dark wave; gothic rock
- Length: 32:20
- Label: Heartworm

Cold Cave chronology
You & Me & Infinity (2018)	Fate in Seven Lessons (2021)	Passion Depression (2024)

Singles from Fate in Seven Lessons
- 1. "Promised Land" Released: February 15, 2019; 2. "Night Light" Released: April 2, 2021; 3. "Prayer from Nowhere" Released: April 28, 2021; 4. "Psalm 23" Released: May 26, 2021

Fate in Seven Lessons is an EP by Cold Cave, released on June 11, 2021 through Heartworm Press.

== Track listing ==
All music is composed by Wesley Eisold and Amy Lee.

No.	Title	Length
1.	"Prayer From Nowhere"	5:03
2.	"Night Light"	4:29
3.	"Psalm 23"	4:10
4.	"Love Is All"	4:34
5.	"Happy Birthday Dark Star"	4:02
6.	"Honey Flower"	5:32
7.	"Promised Land"	4:27
Total length:		32:20
