= Cherish the Light Years =

Studio album by Cold Cave
- Released: April 5, 2011
- Recorded: October–November 2010
- Studio: Electric Lady Studios, Plantain Studios, Stratosphere Sound, and Soundtrack Studios, New York City
- Genre: Synth-pop; post-punk; dark wave; new wave
- Length: 40:35
- Label: Matador
- Producer: Chris Coady

Cold Cave chronology
| Love Comes Close (2009) | Cherish the Light Years (2011) | Full Cold Moon (2014) |

Singles from Cherish the Light Years
- 1. "The Great Pan Is Dead" Released: February 4, 2011; 2. "Villains of the Moon" Released: May 16, 2011; 3. "Confetti" Released: September 5, 2011

Cherish the Light Years is the second studio album by Cold Cave, released on April 5, 2011, on Matador Records.

== Release and reception ==
Professional ratings
Review scores
| Source | Rating |
|---|---|
| Pitchfork | (7.7/10) |
| PopMatters | (7/10) |
| Drowned in Sound | (4/10) |
| Tiny Mix Tapes | 4/5 stars |
| MusicOMH | 4/5 stars |
| Clash Magazine | (8/10) |
| The A.V. Club | (B) |
| Allmusic | 3.5/5 stars |
| Rolling Stone | 3.5/5 stars |
| Consequence of Sound | 3.5/5 stars |
| NME | (7/10) |

Cherish the Light Years was released on April 5, 2011. The album was released by Matador Records on 12" vinyl, CD, and Digital formats. iTunes features an iTunes LP digital download which features an exclusive track, lyrics, and photos.

The album currently holds a 71 out of 100 rating on Metacritic. The score was based on reviews from 26 critics with 20 of the reviews being positive, 4 mixed, and 2 negative.

In a positive review from Pitchfork, Mark Richardson writes "Cherish has the feel of a breakthrough, and Wes Eisold comes across as an artist with a vision that will resonate with a larger audience."

Michael Wheeler, writer for Drowned in Sound writes in a negative review, "What happened is the only thing I can think throughout the first few listens of Cold Cave’s second album, with every subsequent spin less an opportunity to further digest than an effort to double-check if things really are as palpably awful as they seemed the last listen around."

== Track listing ==
All tracks are written by Wesley Eisold; "Catacombs" and "Underworld USA" written by Eisold and Sean Martin.

| No. | Title | Length |
|---|---|---|
| 1. | "The Great Pan Is Dead" | 4:06 |
| 2. | "Pacing Around the Church" | 3:26 |
| 3. | "Confetti" | 5:37 |
| 4. | "Catacombs" | 3:22 |
| 5. | "Underworld USA" | 4:59 |
| 6. | "Icons of Summer" | 5:50 |
| 7. | "Alchemy and You" | 3:28 |
| 8. | "Burning Sage" | 4:03 |
| 9. | "Villains of the Moon" | 5:44 |

iTunes exclusive bonus track
| No. | Title | Length |
|---|---|---|
| 10. | "Our Tears Help the Flowers Grow" | 4:19 |

Japanese CD bonus tracks
| No. | Title | Length |
|---|---|---|
| 10. | "Heaven's Gate" | 3:03 |
| 11. | "Our Tears Help the Flowers Grow" | 4:19 |
| 12. | "Sex Ads '09" | 2:43 |

10th anniversary edition vinyl LP bonus track
| No. | Title | Length |
|---|---|---|
| 10. | "Believe in My Blood" | 4:30 |

== Personnel ==
=== Band personnel ===
- Wesley Eisold - vocals, synthesizer, and bass guitar
- Jennifer Clavin - backing vocals (1, 2, 3, 4, 5, 6, 9) and synthesizer (8)
- Guy Licata - drums and percussion (all tracks)
- Sean Martin - guitar (1, 4, 5)
- Matt Sweeney - bass (1)
- Gillian Rivera - violin (1, 3)
- Beth Meyers - viola (1, 3)
- Justin Kantor - cello (1, 3)
- Dominick Fernow - electronics (2, 4, 8)
- Daryl Palumbo - guitar (2, 3, 7, 9), bass (2, 3, 7, 9) and synthesizer (6)
- Tonie Joy - guitar (3), bass (8)
- Nick Zinner - guitar (7)
- Eric Beyondo - trumpet (7)

=== Technical personnel ===
- Chris Coady - producer, mixing
- Joe LaPorta - mastering
- Greg Morris - engineering
- Daryl Palumbo - pre-production
- Kris Lapke - tracking
- Wesley Eisdold - art direction, layout and design
- Dominick Fernow - art direction, layout and design
- Sebastian Mlynarski - photography
