= Before the Sea Was Built =

Studio album by Raging Speedhorn
- Released: September 11, 2007
- Genre: Sludge metal
- Label: SPV
- Producer: Raging Speedhorn

Raging Speedhorn chronology
How the Great Have Fallen (2005)	Before the Sea Was Built (2007)	Lost Ritual (2016)

Professional ratings
Review scores
Source	Rating
Blabbermouth.net	5.5/10 stars

Before the Sea Was Built is the fourth album by UK sludgecore band Raging Speedhorn, released in 2007. Before the Sea Was Built was the final Raging Speedhorn album before their hiatus from 2008 - 2014, featuring vocalist Bloody Kev (who did guest vocals on Knives And Faces on debut album Raging Speedhorn), and bassist Dave Thompson.

The album sheet features no printed lyrics but instead a group of pictures each related to the sea, which is a recurring theme throughout the album.

== Track listing ==
1. "Everything Changes" (3:19)
2. "Before the Sea Was Built" (2:28)
3. "Dignity Stripper" (2:29)
4. "Mishima" (2:31)
5. "Last Comet from Nothingness" (2:37)
6. "Born to Twist the Knife" (2:11)
7. "Who Will Guard the Guards?" (4:20)
8. "Too Drunk to Give a Fuck" (2:06)
9. "Sound of Waves" (4:32)
10. "Jump Ship" (1:56)

== Personnel ==
- John Loughlin - vocals
- Bloody Kev - vocals
- Gareth Smith - guitar
- Gordon Morison - drums
