= Redweed =

Redweed is a common name for several plants and may refer to:

- Gracilaria tikvahiae, or graceful redweed
- Phytolacca americana, native to North America
- Suaeda australis, native to Australia

== See also ==
- Red weed
- Redweed, a track on the eponymous album Raging Speedhorn (album)
- Redweed, a 1983 videogame by MC Lothlorien
