= You & Me & Infinity =

EP by Cold Cave
- Released: April 27, 2018
- Genre: Synth-pop; dark wave; cold wave; EBM
- Length: 18:42
- Label: Heartworm Press

Cold Cave chronology
| Rebellion Is Over (2015) | You & Me & Infinity (2018) | Fate in Seven Lessons (2021) |

You & Me & Infinity is an EP by Cold Cave, released on April 27, 2018, by Heartworm Press.

== Track listing ==
Side one
| No. | Title | Length |
|---|---|---|
| 1. | "You & Me & Infinity" | 4:42 |
| 2. | "Nothing Is True But You" | 4:12 |

Side two
| No. | Title | Length |
|---|---|---|
| 1. | "Glory" | 5:10 |
| 2. | "My Heart Is Immortal" | 4:38 |

== Personnel ==
Adapted from the You & Me & Infinity liner notes.

Cold Cave

- Wesley Eisold – instruments

Production and design

- Chris Coady – mixing
- Amy Lee – design
- Travis Shinn – photography
- Bob Weston – mastering

== Release history ==
| Region | Date | Label | Format | Catalog |
|---|---|---|---|---|
| United States | 2018 | Heartworm Press | CS, DL, LP | #75 |
