= Raging Speedhorn =

British heavy metal band

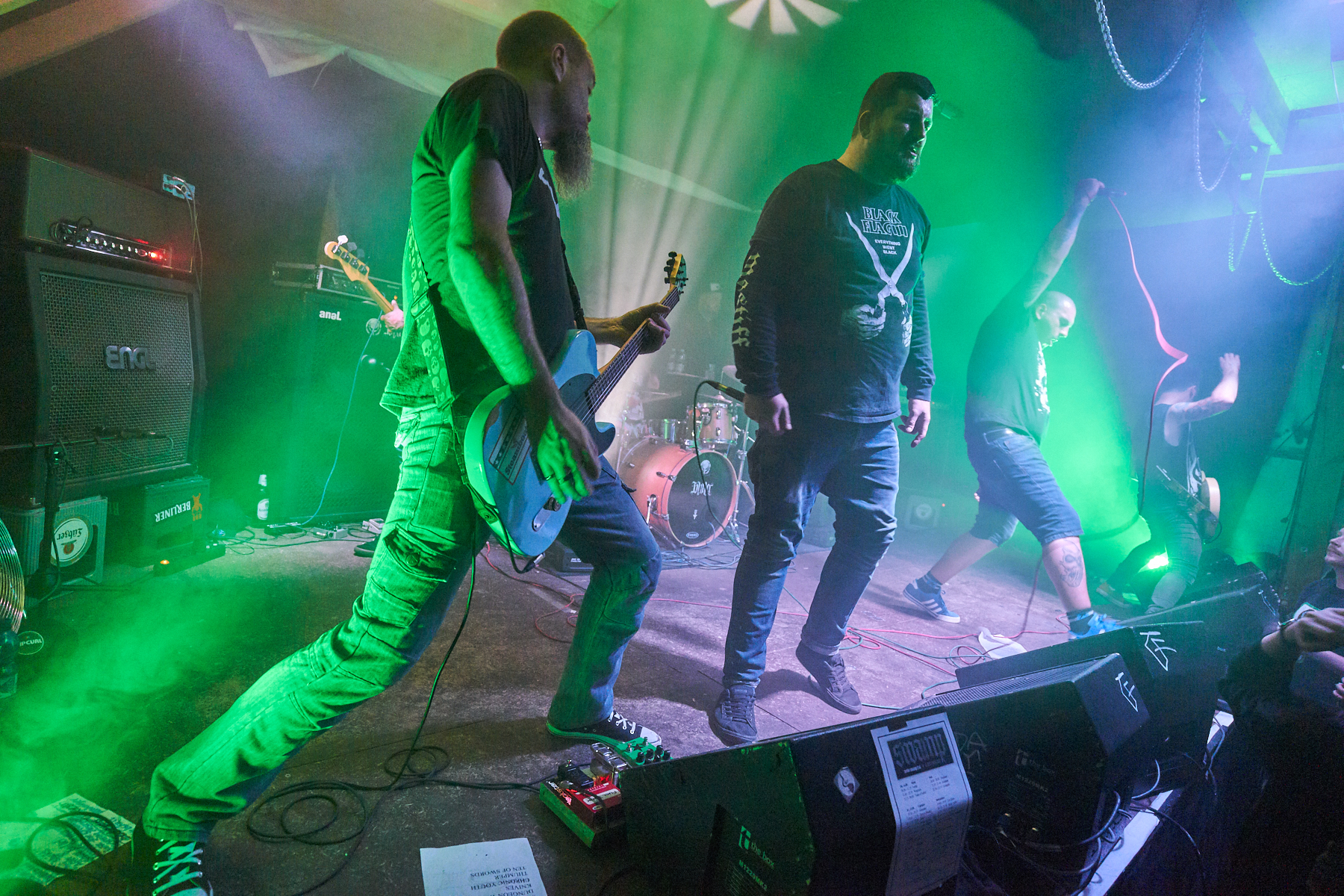
- Raging Speedhorn in 2017

Background information
- Origin: Corby, Northamptonshire, England
- Genres: Sludge metal; hardcore punk; stoner metal; nu metal (early)
- Years active: 1998–2008; 2014–present
- Members: Gordon Morrison; Frank Regan; Daniel Cook; James Palmer; Daf Williams; Andy Gilmour
- Past members: Dave Leese; Jamie Thompson; Dave Thompson; Bloody Kev; Gareth Smith; Tony Loughlin; Darren Smith; John Loughlin
- Website: Raging Speedhorn on X

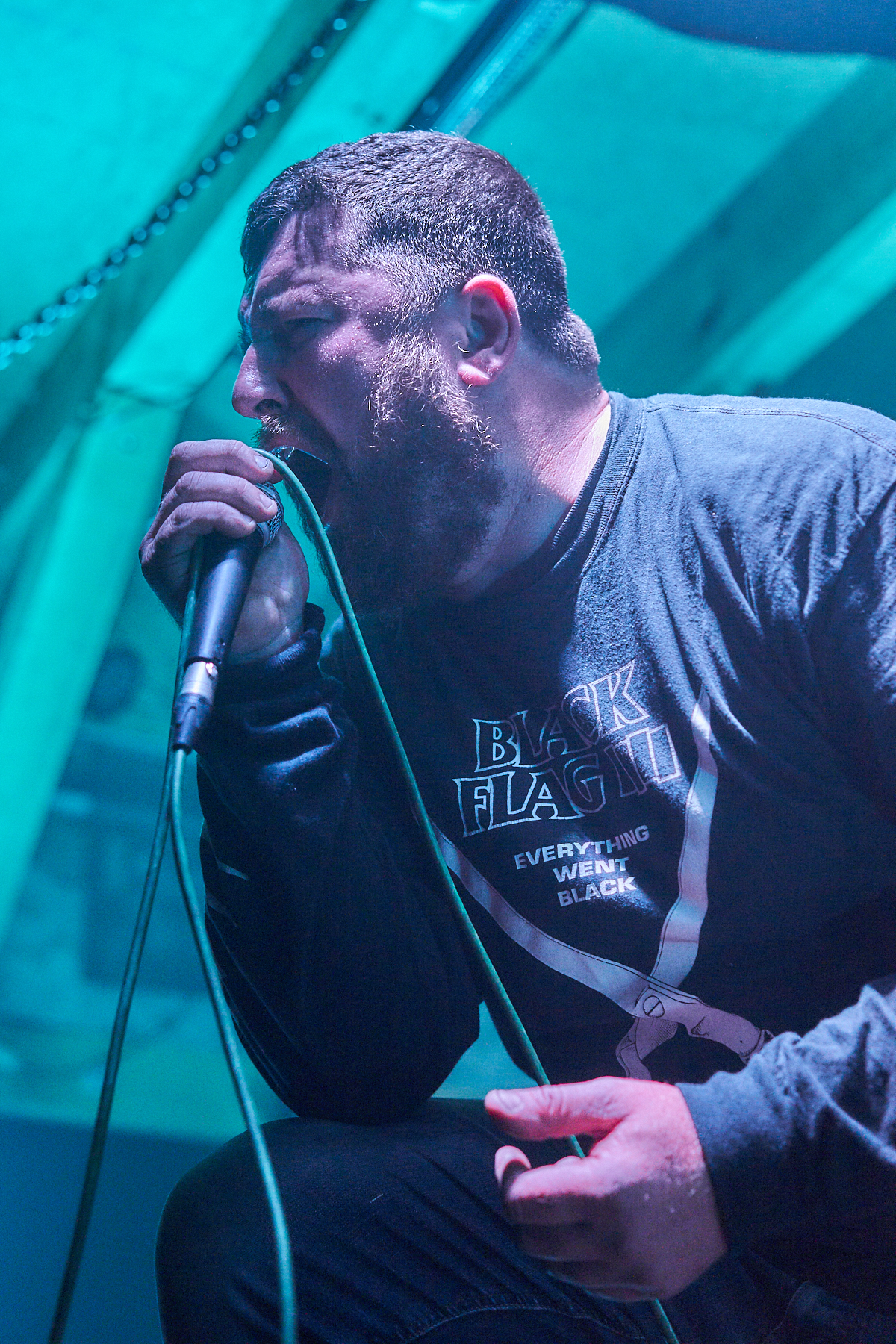
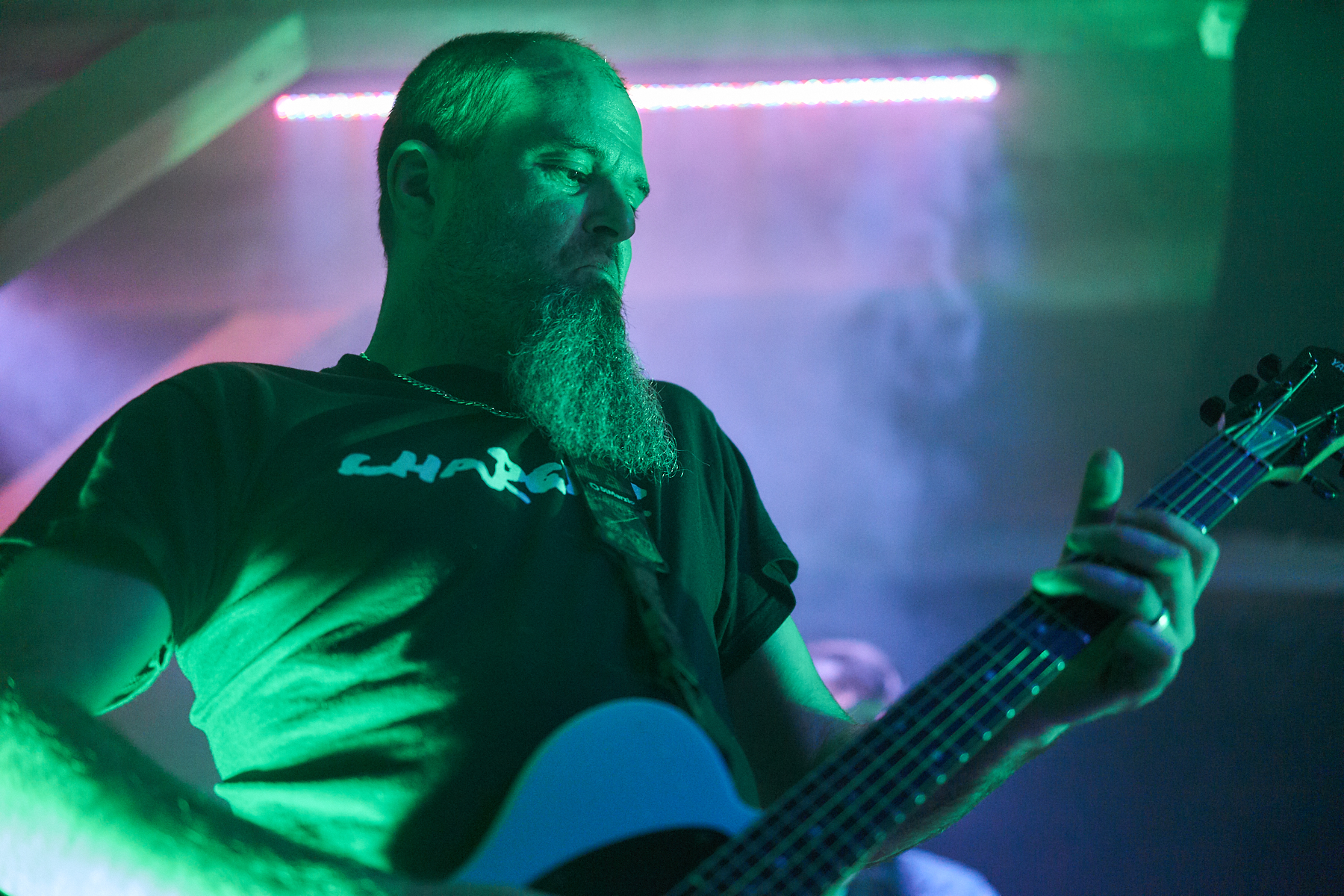
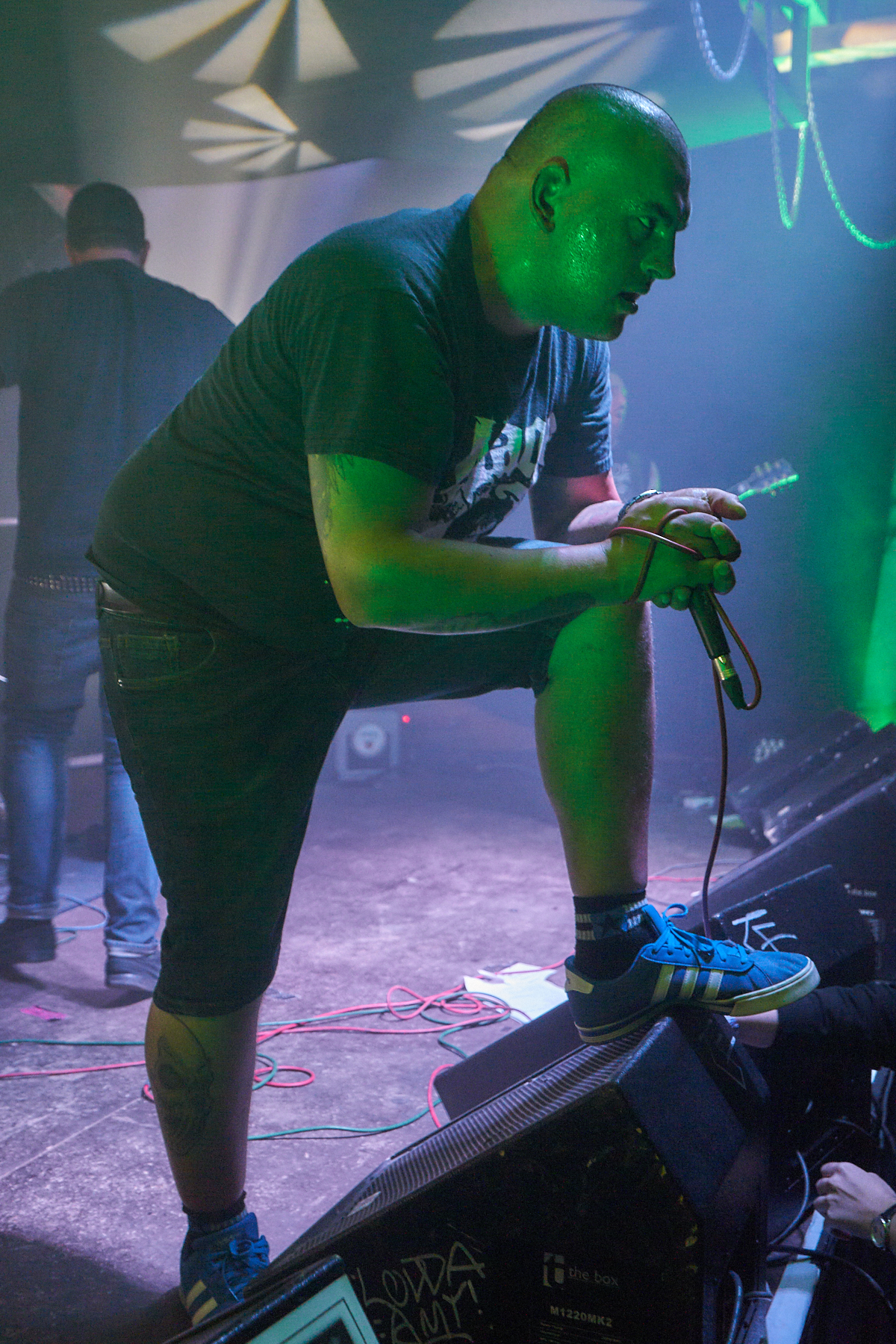
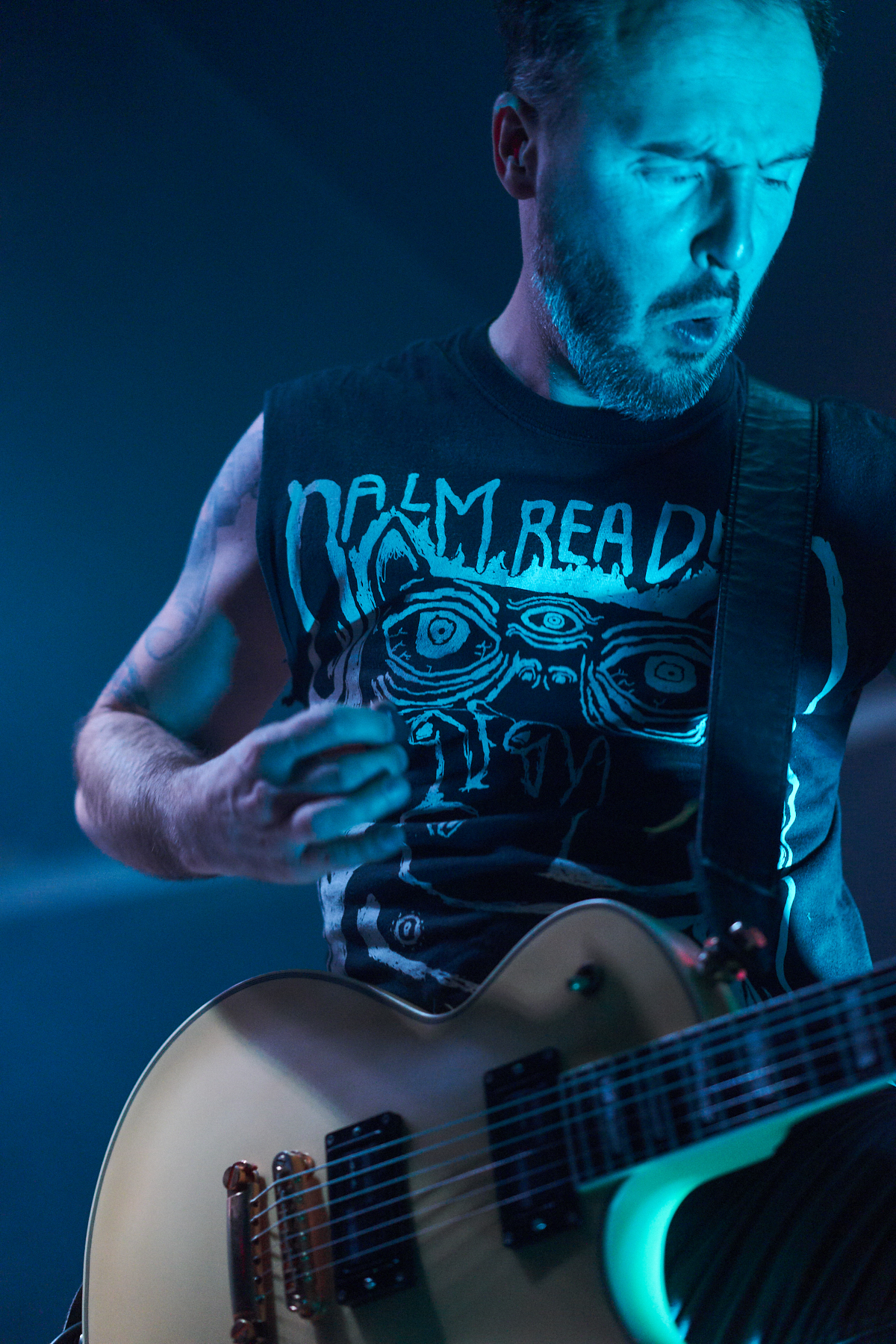
Raging Speedhorn at Swampfest in Berlin, 2017

Raging Speedhorn are a British sludge metal band formed in Corby, Northamptonshire in 1998.

== Career ==
Raging Speedhorn were formed in August 1998 from the merging of the bands Soulcellar and Box. The band quickly established itself as a major presence within the UK's metal scene.

Raging Speedhorn featured two vocalists, a style largely inspired by the UK hardcore band Hard to Swallow (which featured Bloody Kev who would join Raging Speedhorn as their second vocalist after the departure of Frank Regan in 2005). The band's first single, "Thumper" (produced by Marc Heal), was released in 2000 to significant critical acclaim. In 2001, they charted in the UK Singles Chart with "The Gush".

On early Raging Speedhorn recordings, the music can be characterised by pounding basslines, heavily distorted riff-thick guitarwork and subject content consisting generally (but certainly not exclusively) of hedonism, drug use, violence, antipathy for major band labels and depression.

Before the Sea Was Built was the only album the band produced with Larry Hibbitt of Hundred Reasons. It was released on 11 September 2007 through Steamhammer, a subsidiary of SPV Records.

Tour dates were announced with Trophy Scars on 8 March 2008. Weeks later, on 25 March 2008, it was announced the band would split after a final tour. However, the tour was unceremoniously canceled that same day reportedly due to an inability to confirm dates or properly promote. A "final" tour was eventually scheduled for October and November of 2008 with dates across the UK and Ireland and finishing in Japan. Members joined other bands elsewhere, including Cardiff, Wales, and Stockholm, Sweden. John Loughlin, Jay Thompson and Dave Thompson were in the metal band The Death of Us as of 2013.

On 18 February 2014, it was announced that the band would reform to perform at Damnation Festival in November 2014. Both John Loughlin and Frank Regan would feature on vocals, with the band showcasing tracks from their debut and sophomore albums. The band was also confirmed to play the UK leg of the 2014 Sonisphere festival.

On 3 July 2014, the band played a sold-out hometown show with support from The Darkhorse and Heart of a Coward as a warm-up prior to playing at Sonisphere two days later. On 7 July 2014, an eleven-date UK tour was announced.

In January 2016, the band recorded their new full-length record, Lost Ritual, with Russ Russell at the Parlour Studios in Kettering.

On 14 September 2018, it was announced that guitarists Jim Palmer and Jamie Thompson had left the band.

On 6 October 2018, the band performed a 20th-anniversary show at the Electric Ballroom in London with the original lineup (John Loughlin, Frank Regan, Gordon Morison, Tony Loughlin, Gareth Smith & Darren Smith).

On 19 December 2018, it was announced that James Palmer and Dave Leese had joined the band on guitars. It was announced in September 2019 that Daniel Cook would be replacing John Loughlin after 21 years.

== Musical style ==
At the start of their career with their earlier albums, Raging Speedhorn played nu metal. The band now plays a combination of hardcore punk, extreme metal, sludge, and stoner metal.

== Members ==
=== Current ===
- Gordon Morison – drums (1998–2008, 2014–present)
- Frank Regan – vocals (1998–2005, 2014–present)
- James Palmer – guitar (2018–present)
- Daniel Cook – vocals (2019–present)
- Andy Gilmour – bass (2019–present)
- Daf Williams – guitar (2022–present)

=== Former ===
- John Loughlin – vocals (1998–2008, 2014–2019)
- Gareth Smith – guitar (1998–2008)
- Tony Loughlin – guitar (1998–2006)
- Darren Smith – bass (1998–2006)
- Kevin "Bloody Kev" Greenham – vocals (2005–2008)
- Jay Thompson – guitar (2005–2008)
- Dave Thompson – bass (2008)
- Anthony Elsayed - guitar (1998-2000)
- Dave Leese – guitar (2018–2022)

== Discography ==
=== Studio albums ===
- Raging Speedhorn (2000)
- We Will Be Dead Tomorrow (2002)
- How the Great Have Fallen (2005)
- Before the Sea Was Built (2007)
- Lost Ritual (2016)
- Hard to Kill (2020)
- Night Wolf (2025)

=== Live albums ===
- Live and Demos'' (2004)
- 20 Year Anniversary Show (2018)
