= Mika Miko =

American rock band

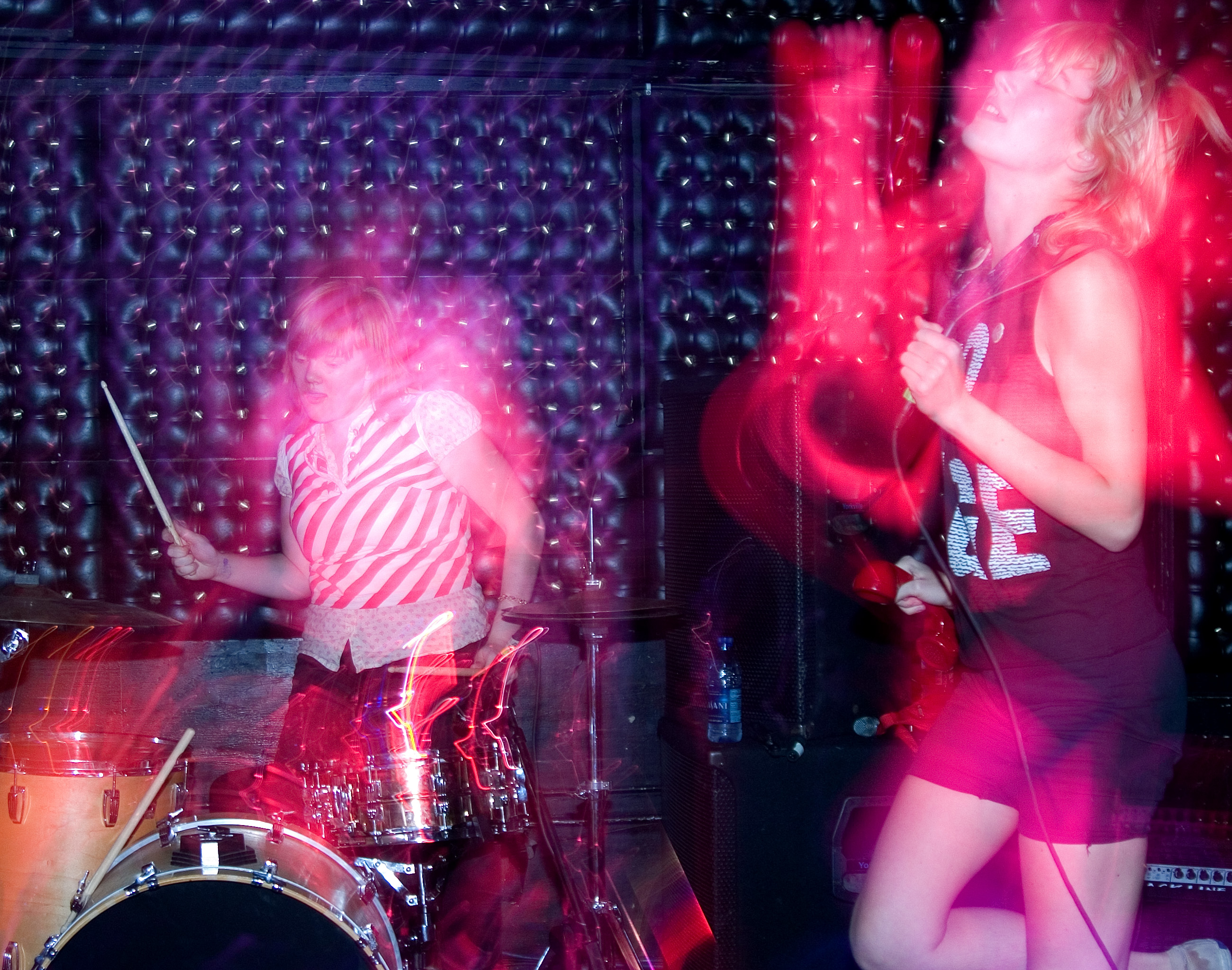
- Mika Miko performing in September 2006

Background information
- Origin: Los Angeles, California, U.S.
- Genres: Garage rock; lo-fi
- Years active: 2003–2010
- Labels: Post Present Medium, Kill Rock Stars, Not Not Fun, Olfactory, Deleted Art, Sub Pop
- Past members: Jennifer Clavin, Jessie Clavin, Jenna Thornhill, Michelle Suarez, Seth Densham, Jerik Edrosa, Kate Hall
- Website: https://mikamiko.blogspot.com/

Mika Miko was an American band formed in 2003 in Los Angeles, California. In 2004, they gained local popularity for their frenetic live performances. Featuring Victor Fandgore (Jennifer Clavin), Jet Blanca (Jenna Thornhill), Michelle Suarez, Jessica Clavin, and Jon Erik Edrosa, the original line up of the band made its first demo CD-R, its first 7" record, and toured the West Coast extensively before replacing their original drummer with Kate Hall and embarking on their first national tour in the summer of 2005. Also in 2005, they were featured on two compilations released by Los Angeles–based record labels, produced their first two self-released cassettes, and two members of the band appeared on the Hawnay Troof EP, Community.

Their first full-length album was co-released by Post Present Medium and Kill Rock Stars in the summer of 2006. A second pressing on vinyl was later released by Sweden based label Deleted Art. In August 2006, the band appeared on the cover of Maximum Rocknroll, alongside an interview and photoshoot by Vice Cooler. In July 2006, they were featured in ANP Quarterly. Members of the band appeared in the film 40 Bands/80 Minutes!, released in 2006. The band was featured in the Static section of Punk Planet's 76th issue (November/December 2006). They often played at The Smell, an all-ages venue in Los Angeles, where they were also volunteers. The band toured in Europe and Japan in 2008.

Despite a sizable discography, the band stated they are best appreciated live. As Jessica Clavin told ClashMusic.com: "I think we come off better live than we do recorded. It's better to have that impact as a live band, isn't it? If we had to choose to be better live or recorded, we'd go with live."

In October 2009, the band decided to disband due to the members' wishes to return to school and work on other projects. On December 30 and 31, 2009, and January 1, 2010, the band played their last shows at The Smell in downtown Los Angeles.

In 2011, the Clavin sisters formed a new band, Bleached; they released their debut album, Ride Your Heart, in 2013.

Mika Miko reunited in August 2023 for a show at the Teragram Ballroom in Los Angeles.

== Band line-up ==
- Victor Fandgore (Jennifer Clavin) – vocals, guitar, keyboards
- Jet Blanca (Jenna Thornhill) – vocals, saxophone, keyboards
- Michelle Diane Suarez – guitar, keyboards
- Jessie Clavin – bass
- Kate Hall – drums

== Discography ==
=== EPs/singles ===
- Demo CD-R (Self-released, 2003)
- Mika Miko 7" (Post Present Medium, 2004)
- Mika Miko Tape (Self-Released, 2005)
- Live and Rare! (Self-Released, 2005)
- 666 EP (Post Present Medium, 2007)
- Sex Jazz 7" (Sub Pop, 2008)

=== Albums ===
- C.Y.S.L.A.B.F. (Kill Rock Stars / Post Present Medium, 2006)
- We Be Xuxa (Post Present Medium) (2009)

=== Compilations ===
- 666 and Rare CD (Post Present Medium, 2007)

=== Compilation appearances ===
- Treasure Tropics EP (Not Not Fun, 2005)
- Under 21: Los Angeles! A Compilation of Rad Youth (Olfactory Records, 2005)
