= Lost Ritual =

Studio album by Raging Speedhorn
- Released: July 15, 2016
- Genre: Sludge metal
- Producer: Raging Speedhorn

Raging Speedhorn chronology
| Before the Sea Was Built (2007) | Lost Ritual (2016) | 20 Year Anniversary (2018) |

Professional ratings
Review scores
| Source | Rating |
|---|---|
| Louder Sound | 4/5 stars |
| Metal Temple | 6/10 stars |

Lost Ritual is the fifth album by UK sludgecore band Raging Speedhorn. It is their first full-length record since their re-union in 2014 and the first to feature original vocalist Frank Regan since 2005's How the Great Have Fallen.

== Track listing ==
1. "Bring Out Your Dead"
2. "Halfway To Hell"
3. "Motörhead"
4. "Evil Or Mental"
5. "Ten Of Swords"
6. "Dogshit Blues"
7. "Hangman"
8. "Shit Outta Luck"
9. "Coming Home"
10. "Unleash The Serpent"
