= God Made the World =

Single by Cold Cave
- Released: 2013
- Genre: Synthpop
- Length: 5:05
- Label: Heartworm Press
- Songwriter(s): Wesley Eisold
- Producer(s): Wesley Eisold

Cold Cave singles chronology
"Oceans with No End" (2013)	"God Made the World" (2013)	"Black Boots" (2013)

"God Made the World" is a song by American synthpop act Cold Cave. It was released in 2013 as a single through Heartworm Press — a publishing company and a record label founded by Wesley Eisold of Cold Cave. The release is a part of the series of singles released by Cold Cave in 2013. Alongside the other 2013 singles, it was included in Full Cold Moon compilation album in 2014.

The lyrics of the song were etched on the b-side of the 7" vinyl release. The digital version of the single also featured an instrumental track titled, "Dandelion."

== Critical reception ==
Harley Brown of Pitchfork labeled the single as "best new track," writing: "“God” is a fitting sermon of love indeed, a tentatively uplifting departure from Eisold’s industrial-strength “Oceans With No End” single. New wave-y guitars act as the sinew holding Eisold’s thin, aching murmurs to a racing beat that nearly runs away from him." Fact magazine described the song as "an exercise in Factory Records fetishism," while also stating: "It’s not that Eisold doesn’t carry the New Order/Joy Division banner well, but the track does border on derivative, at least for us." John Hall of The Independent compared the song's "post-punk guitars and the beat" to the works of New Order or Depeche Mode, mentioning that it is "considerably darker than The Boy Least Likely To." Kyle McGovern of Spin also noted the "New Order-indebted" elements on the song.

Josiah Hughes of Exclaim! wrote: "The track's another melodic synth anthem with mechanical beats and a hint of guitar, though it's one of the more pop-oriented Cold Cave works in recent memory." Michael Roffman of Consequence of Sound commented that "Wesley Eisold lays all his cards down for a Jim Reid flush." He also described the track as a "melancholic number sounds like a walking leather jacket," nodding to the single's artwork.

== Track listing ==
7" vinyl

1. "God Made the World" — 5:05

Digital download

1. "God Made the World" — 5:05
2. "Dandelion" — 2:45

== Personnel ==
Personnel as adapted from the official Heartworm Press website:

- Wesley Eisold — writing, performance, recording, production
- Amy Lee — design
- Miguel Escobar — photography
