= Welcome the Worms =

Studio album by Bleached
- Released: April 1, 2016
- Genre: Punk rock
- Length: 36:05
- Label: Dead Oceans
- Producers: Carlos de la Garza; Joe Chiccarelli

Bleached chronology
Ride Your Heart (2013)	Welcome the Worms (2016)	Don't You Think You've Had Enough? (2019)

Professional ratings
Aggregate scores
Source	Rating
Metacritic	70/100
Review scores
Source	Rating
AllMusic	3.5/5 stars
Consequence of Sound	B
Pitchfork Media	6.9/10
Rolling Stone	3.5/5 stars

Welcome the Worms is the second studio album by American punk rock band Bleached. It was released in April 2016 under Dead Oceans Records.

== Track list ==
No.	Title	Writer(s)	Length
1.	"Keep on Keepin' On"	Jennifer Clavin; Jessica Clavin; Micayla Grace	4:27
2.	"Trying to Lose Myself Again"	Clavin; Clavin	2:47
3.	"Sleepwalking"	Clavin; Clavin	3:53
4.	"Wednesday Night Melody"	Clavin; Clavin; Marc Jordan	3:41
5.	"Wasted on You"	Clavin; Clavin	3:12
6.	"Chemical Air"	Clavin; Clavin; Jordan	3:05
7.	"Sour Candy"	Clavin; Clavin; Grace	3:50
8.	"Desolate Town"	Clavin; Clavin; Jordan	3:56
9.	"I'm All Over the Place (Mystic Mama)"	Clavin; Clavin; Grace	3:46
10.	"Hollywood, We Did It All Wrong"	Clavin; Clavin	3:28
