= Hard to Kill (Raging Speedhorn album) =

Studio album by Raging Speedhorn
- Released: 23 October 2020
- Producer: Raging Speedhorn

Raging Speedhorn chronology
| Lost Ritual (2016) | Hard to Kill (2020) |

Professional ratings
Review scores
| Source | Rating |
|---|---|
| Kerrang! | 3/5 |
| Louder Sound | 4/5 stars |

Hard to Kill is the sixth album by British sludgecore band Raging Speedhorn, released on 23 October 2020. It is the first album to feature new vocalist Dan Cook who replaced John Loughlin who had fronted the band for more than two decades.

== Track listing ==
1. "Snakebite"
2. "Doom Machine"
3. "Spitfire"
4. "Hard to Kill"
5. "Hammer Down"
6. "Hand Of God"
7. "Brutality"
8. "The Beast"
9. "Children Of The Revolution"
