= Oceans with No End =

Single by Cold Cave
- B-side: "People Are Poison"
- Released: 2013
- Recorded: December 2012 at Wes Eisold's home in Hollywood, California
- Genre: Synthpop, gothic rock, electronic rock
- Length: 4:35
- Label: Deathwish (DW144)
- Songwriter: Wesley Eisold
- Producer: Wesley Eisold

Cold Cave singles chronology
"A Little Death to Laugh" (2012)	"Oceans with No End" (2013)	"God Made the World" (2013)

"Oceans with No End" is a single by the American synthpop band Cold Cave. The single was released in 2013 through Deathwish Inc. — a label co-founded by Jacob Bannon of Converge. "Oceans with No End" was also the first release from the band following the death of former Cold Cave contributor Justin Benoit.

== Critical reception ==
In his track review, Ian Cohen of Pitchfork wrote that "the track draws from Cherish the Light Years' potent and extremely loud alchemy of goth-rock and jock-jams." He also stated: "Befitting its lower-stakes release, "Oceans with No End" is a little more brittle and streamlined than "The Great Pan Is Dead", but it regardless captures that all-consuming sense of ambition and yearning contained within the latter." On the b-side "People Are Poison", Cohen also stated: "'People' allows a more exploratory approach to finding new angles on tried and true influences, turning the shuffle in DM's ten-gallon hat goth into something more linear while adding the grainy, brittle distortion of early Jesus and Mary Chain."

== Track listing ==
All songs written, recorded and performed by Wes Eisold.

Side A

1. "Oceans with No End" – 4:35

Side B

1. "People Are Poison" – 3:57

== Personnel ==
"Oceans with No End" personnel adapted from liner notes.

- Jacob Bannon – art design
- Wesley Eisold – recording, composition, all instruments, art direction
- Kris Lapke – mixing, mastering
- Dan Rawe – photography
