= We Will Be Dead Tomorrow =

Studio album by Raging Speedhorn
- Released: 15 August 2002
- Recorded: Hook End Manor; Tracks 3 & 8 in Albert Studios; Tracks 4, 6, 7, 9, and 10 in Mission Sound and Ratpiss Studios
- Genre: Sludge metal
- Length: 54:11
- Label: ZTT
- Producer: William Graziadei and Danny Schuler

Raging Speedhorn chronology
| Raging Speedhorn (2000) | We Will Be Dead Tomorrow (2002) | Live and Demos (2004) |

Professional ratings
Review scores
| Source | Rating |
|---|---|
| Drowned in Sound | 9/10 |
| NME | 8/10 |

We Will Be Dead Tomorrow is the second album by UK sludgecore band Raging Speedhorn.

== Track listing ==
1. "The Hate Song"
2. "Scrapin' The Resin"
3. "Me and You Man"
4. "Scaramanga"
5. "Chronic Youth"
6. "Iron Cobra"
7. "Heartbreaker"
8. "Fuck the Voodooman"
9. "Spitting Blood"
10. "Welcome to Shitsville"
11. "Ride With the Devil"
  Bonus track (Japanese edition)
12. "My War" (Black Flag cover)

== Personnel ==
- Frank Regan - vocals
- John Loughlin - vocals
- Gareth Smith - guitar
- Tony Loughlin - guitar
- Darren "Daz" Smith - bass
- Gordon Morison - drums
