= Ride Your Heart =

Studio album by Bleached
- Released: April 2, 2013
- Genres: Garage rock; indie rock; jangle pop; punk rock; surf rock
- Length: 36:59
- Label: Dead Oceans

Bleached chronology
Searching Through the Past (2011)	Ride Your Heart (2013)	Welcome the Worms (2016)

Ride Your Heart is the debut studio album by American punk rock band Bleached. The album was released on April 2, 2013, through Dead Oceans.

== Critical reception ==
Professional ratings
Aggregate scores
Source	Rating
AnyDecentMusic?	6.7/10
Metacritic	70/100
Review scores
Source	Rating
AllMusic	3.5/5 stars
Consequence of Sound	C+
Exclaim!	3/5 stars
Filter	74/100
The Line of Best Fit	6.5/10 stars
Mojo	4/5 stars
musicOMH	4/5 stars
New Musical Express	4/5 stars
Pitchfork	6.6/10
Slant	3.5/5 stars

Ride Your Heart has been generally well received by contemporary music critics and journalists. On review aggregator, Metacritic, Ride Your Heart has an average rating of 70 out of 100 indicating "generally favorable reviews based on 17 Critics."

== Track listing ==
All lyrics are written by Jennifer and Jessica Clavin; all music is composed by Bleached.

No.	Title	Length
1.	"Looking for a Fight"	2:17
2.	"Next Stop"	2:33
3.	"Outta My Mind"	3:24
4.	"Dead in Your Head"	4:21
5.	"Dreaming Without You"	3:19
6.	"Waiting by the Telephone"	1:56
7.	"Love Spells"	2:53
8.	"Searching Through the Past"	3:17
9.	"Ride Your Heart"	2:51
10.	"Dead Boy"	3:26
11.	"Guy Like You"	2:39
12.	"When I Was Yours"	4:07
Total length:		36:59

== Charts ==
Chart (2013)	Peak position
US Heatseekers Albums (Billboard)	18
