= How the Great Have Fallen =

Studio album by Raging Speedhorn
- Released: May 24, 2005
- Recorded: at New Rising Studio
- Genre: Sludge metal
- Length: 62:03
- Label: SPV
- Producer: Mark Daghorn, Raging Speedhorn

Raging Speedhorn chronology
Live and Demos (2004)	How the Great Have Fallen (2005)	Before The Sea Was Built (2007)

Professional ratings
Review scores
Source	Rating
AllMusic	3.5/5 stars
Blabbermouth.net	7/10 stars
Chronicles of Chaos	8/10 stars

How the Great Have Fallen is the third album by UK sludge metal band Raging Speedhorn. It is the first album by the band to be specifically released in the United States. It was also praised for the specific quality of its hidden track.

== Track listing ==
1. A Different Shade of Shit
2. Oh How the Great Have Fallen...
3. Dead Man Walking
4. Master of Disaster
5. Snatching Defeat from the Jaws of Victory
6. How Much Can a Man Take?
7. Fuck You! Pay Me!
8. Slay The Coward
9. The Infidel Is Dead
10. Don't Let the Bastards Grind You Down

=== Bonus tracks ===
1. God of Thunder (Kiss cover)
2. Hatred (The Kinks cover)
