= Don't You Think You've Had Enough? =

Studio album by Bleached
- Released: July 12, 2019
- Genres: Funk rock; post-punk; pop rock
- Length: 39:03
- Label: Dead Oceans
- Producer: Shane Stoneback

Bleached chronology
Welcome the Worms (2016)	Don't You Think You've Had Enough? (2019)

Singles from Don't You Think You've Had Enough?
- 1. "Shitty Ballet" Released: April 11, 2019; 2. "Hard to Kill" Released: April 30, 2019; 3. "Kiss You Goodbye" Released: June 5, 2019

Don't You Think You've Had Enough? is the third studio album by American punk rock band Bleached. It was released on July 12, 2019, under Dead Oceans.

== Background and recording ==
Shane Stoneback was the producer for the album. The album is the first album the band has produced while sober. In a press release, Jennifer Clavin said that "writing these songs while sober became somewhat of a spiritual experience. I had to let go, trust the process, and allow an energy beyond my control to be present."

The album itself was announced with the announcement of "Hard to Kill" single. This was verified on the band's Instagram page along with the artwork of the album.

== Music and composition ==
The first three singles ahead of the album have been described to an eclectic range of sounds, such as funk rock, post-punk, and acoustic music.

== Release and promotion ==
=== Packaging ===
Ahead of the sale of the album, the album was available to be purchased either as an MP3, CD, LP, or cassette tape. The packaging was red and black for all physical versions of the album.

=== Singles ===
Three singles were released prior to the release of Don’t You Think You’ve Had Enough? The first single, "Shitty Ballet", was released on April 11, 2019. On April 30, 2019, the second single, "Hard to Kill" was released as a Double A-side, with "Shitty Ballet" being the second track on the single. The third single, "Kiss You Goodbye", was released on June 5, 2019, as a triple A-side with the previous two singles being part of the digital and streaming single.

The first single, "Shitty Ballet" was described as a more tender single, and more acoustic-focused. In recording "Shitty Ballet", sisters Jessica and Jennifer Clavin said that the song was written "in mere hours in a deluge of heartbreak". Lake Schatz, writing for Consequence of Sound, called the track a "trade for crunchy garage rock for a more featherweight sound". Schatz said of "Shitty Ballet" that despite "gentler touch for the ears", that the track "still contains some bite in its message". In describing "Shitty Ballet", the band said "Bleached has always been a pretty loud rock band so we felt it was time to explore a more stripped down style of playing. With the vulnerability of the lyrics we decided to carry that into the instruments as well for the first time recording with just an acoustic guitar and vocals. Sonic change is important to us right now. More of that coming soon."

"Hard to Kill" has been described by the band as "staring down the road towards death and realizing I needed to wake up and get out of my selfish patterns of self destruction." Stylistically, Julia Gray of Stereogum called the song with a "whistled hook, abundant cowbell", and a catchy chorus.

The third song "Kiss You Goodbye" has been described as a funky post-punk track. According to the band, “Kiss You Goodbye” is about letting go of toxic people in your life and freeing yourself from their negativity. Savannah Sicurella, writing for Paste, described "Kiss You Goodbye" as "a funky bass riff carries the song through vibrant, glimmering chords and pop-sweetened drum loops as vocalist Jennifer Clavin bids adieu to whichever lover-of-the-moment she’s grown sick of. It’s the summertime—she has no time for romantic bullshit."

=== Music videos ===
Three corresponding music videos to the main singles were released simultaneously. The lead music video to "Shitty Ballet" also came out on April 11, 2019. The music video was directed by Juliana and Nicky Giraffe Studios while Jeremy Mackie served as the directory of photography for the video. The Giraffes also directed the band's second music video, "Hard to Kill". The third music video for "Kiss You Goodbye", also directed by the Giraffes, came out on June 5, 2019. Max Whipple and Deedee LeDuke were assistant directors for the song, and Tyler Weinberger served as the directory of photography for the track.

The music video for "Shitty Ballet" is a one shot video with a purple tint. The video features a series of young ballet dancers twirling around the band as they perform the track.

Courtney E. Smith, writing for Refinery29, said of the "Kiss You Goodbye" music video that "if you ever wondered what watching MTV in its heyday of the early '80s was like, they capture the vibe perfectly in their new single and video. Post-punk is getting a revival and it sounds so sweet."

=== Music tour ===
In promotion of the album, Bleached began a summer music tour across North America that began in May 2019 and concluded in October 2019.

== Track listing ==
The track listing and lengths transcribed from Apple Music.

No.	Title	Writer(s)	Length
1.	"Heartbeat Away"	Jennifer Clavin; Jessica Clavin; Morgan Nagler	3:25
2.	"Hard to Kill"	Clavin; Clavin; Caleb Shreve; Jon Siebels	3:26
3.	"Daydream"	Clavin; Clavin	3:39
4.	"I Get What I Need"	Clavin; Clavin; Shreve; Siebels	1:46
5.	"Somebody Dial 911"	Clavin; Clavin; Jarrod Gorbel	3:26
6.	"Kiss You Goodbye"	Clavin; Clavin	3:16
7.	"Rebound City"	Clavin; Clavin; Gorbel	3:46
8.	"Silly Girl"	Clavin; Clavin; Gorbel	3:03
9.	"Valley to LA"	Clavin; Clavin; Gorbel	3:27
10.	"Real Life"	Clavin; Clavin; Ryan Sparker; Tom Peyton	2:44
11.	"Awkward Phase"	Clavin; Clavin; Madi Diaz; Kyle Ryan	3:23
12.	"Shitty Ballet"	Clavin; Clavin; Diaz	3:43
Total length:			39:03
