= The DNA Will Have Its Say =

EP by Some Girls
- Released: April 26, 2005
- Recorded: August–October 2004
- Genre: Mathcore, hardcore punk
- Length: 6:17
- Label: Three One G Records

Some Girls chronology
All My Friends Are Going Death (2003)	The DNA Will Have Its Say (2005)	Heaven's Pregnant Teens (2005)

Professional ratings
Review scores
Source	Rating
Pitchfork Media	(5.9/10)

The DNA Will Have Its Say is an EP by Some Girls. Karen O also appears on some songs.

== Track listing ==
No.	Title	Length
1.	"I Need Drugs"	1:02
2.	"A Sick Cult"	0:56
3.	"Me & My Blasphemy"	0:45
4.	"The DNA Will Have Its Say"	1:03
5.	"Don't Hate Me Just 'Cause I Hate You"	1:03
6.	"Nazi Rodeo"	0:41
7.	"Hot Air Balloons"	0:46
