= Heaven's Pregnant Teens =

Studio album by Some Girls
- Released: January 24, 2006
- Genres: Mathcore, hardcore punk
- Length: 25:00
- Label: Epitaph
- Producer: Alex Newport

Some Girls chronology
The DNA Will Have Its Say (2005)	Heaven's Pregnant Teens (2006)

Professional ratings
Review scores
Source	Rating
AllMusic	3/5 stars
Pitchfork	(6.8/10)
Tiny Mix Tapes	3.5/5 stars

Heaven's Pregnant Teens is the first and only studio album by Californian punk band Some Girls. It was their last recording as a band before their break-up in 2007.

== Track listing ==
No.	Title	Length
1.	"Beautiful Rune"	2:12
2.	"Hot Piss"	1:02
3.	"Dead in a Web"	0:48
4.	"Warm Milk"	1:05
5.	"You'll Be Happier with Lower Standards"	0:45
6.	"Ex Nuns/Dead Dogs"	1:51
7.	"Totally Pregnant Teens"	0:54
8.	"Bone Metal"	1:26
9.	"Marry Mortuary"	1:36
10.	"Religion II"	2:38
11.	"Skull's Old Girlfriends"	0:50
12.	"Retard and Feathered"	0:46
13.	"Deathface"	9:07

"Religion II" is a cover of a Public Image Ltd. song from their album First Issue.
