= Love Comes Close =

Studio album by Cold Cave
- Released: November 3, 2009
- Recorded: 2009
- Genres: Synth-pop; cold wave; dark wave
- Length: 31:24
- Labels: Heartworm, Matador
- Producer: Wesley Eisold

Cold Cave chronology
Easel and Ruby (2009)	Love Comes Close (2009)	Stars Explode (2010)

Singles from Love Comes Close
- 1. "The Trees Grew Emotions and Died" Released: 2008; 2. "Love Comes Close" Released: 2009; 3. "Life Magazine" Released: 2010

Love Comes Close is the debut album by Cold Cave, released in November 2009 on Matador Records.

== Release and reception ==
Professional ratings
Review scores
Source	Rating
AllMusic	4/5 stars
Pitchfork	(7.6/10)
PopMatters	(6/10)
Drowned in Sound	(7/10)
Tiny Mix Tapes	3/5 stars
Now	4/5 stars

Love Comes Close was released on November 3, 2009, by Matador Records, on 12" vinyl, CD, and Digital formats. On Metacritic it has a rating of 69 out of 100 based on reviews from 10 critics.

Pitchfork's Zach Kelly gave Love Comes Close a positive review with a score of 7.6. He describes singer Wesley Eisold's voice as a "devilish baritone channeling the vocal reticence of Ian Curtis one moment and the yearning of The National's Matt Berninger the next."

In a mixed review from PopMatters, Matthew Collins said, "Love Comes Close shows some potential for artist growth with a little more seasoned songwriting."

The track "Life Magazine" was used in a 2009 RadioShack commercial, and as a soundtrack in the Konami game Pro Evolution Soccer 2012.

== Track listing ==
1. "Cebe and Me" – 3:43
2. "Love Comes Close" – 4:26
3. "Life Magazine" – 2:56
4. "The Laurels of Erotomania" – 2:53
5. "Heaven Was Full" – 3:43
6. "The Trees Grew Emotions and Died" – 4:04
7. "Hello Rats" – 1:49
8. "Youth and Lust" – 4:01
9. "I.C.D.K." – 3:49

Bonus tracks

10. "Double Lives in Single Beds" – 2:46
11. "Theme from Tomorrowland" – 4:44
12. "Now That I'm in the Future" – 3:12

== Personnel ==
Music

- Wesley Eisold – uncredited
- Sean Martin (Hatebreed) – guitar (tracks 2, 6), bass (track 3)
- Caralee McElroy (Xiu Xiu) – uncredited

Recording and production

- Eric Broucek – mixing (tracks 1, 2, 5)
- Cold Cave – production, recording
- Steven De Palo – mixing (tracks 3, 4, 6, 8, 9), mastering
- Gary Olson – mixing (track 7)

Artwork and design

- Pete Ashton – booklet photographs
- Wesley Eisold – cover and inside panel photographs
- Anthony Smyrski – layout
