= Some Girls (California band) =

American hardcore punk band

- Origin: San Diego, California, United States
- Genres: Hardcore punk; mathcore
- Years active: 2002–2007
- Labels: Deathwish Inc.; Three One G; Epitaph
- Past members: Wesley Eisold; Justin Pearson; Sal Gallegos III; Rockey Crane; Rob Moran; Christopher Sprague; Chuck Rowell; Nathan Joyner

Some Girls was an American hardcore punk band consisting of a collective of musicians who came from different backgrounds and all who had established hardcore bands.

== History ==
=== Formation and early releases (2002–2003) ===
Some Girls began in early 2002 when singer Wesley Eisold and guitarist Rob Moran spoke of putting together a hardcore band that would “fuck people up.” The very next day, drummer Sal Gallegos was called in to assist Eisold and Moran and, within a few hours, the first Some Girls songs were created.

After being impressed by the band's demos, Deathwish Inc offered to put out the band’s first 7-inch, The Rains after some remixing and remastering. After the release the band wanted to play live shows, however the band did not yet have a bass player. The band's original idea was to get a different bass player for each show, however the band got in touch with bassist Justin Pearson and after a two shows the band asked Pearson to join. In the months that followed, Some Girls added a second guitar player Christopher Sprague and recorded another EP, The Blues. The band's EPs would later be collected on the band's 2003 compilation album All My Friends Are Going Death.

=== The DNA Will Have Its Say and Heaven's Pregnant Teens (2004–2006) ===
In 2004 the band went on two tours the first being through the East Coast and the second being through the West Coast. Shortly after the East Coast tour, Sprague parted ways with the band to concentrate on his work with Tristeza and was replaced by guitarist Chuck Rowell. The band entered the studio in August 2004 to record The DNA Will Have Its Say, a seven track EP that hinted at the band’s "future musical ambitions to create something that was at once brutal and innovative." In 2005, founding member Moran left the group to move to Seattle and pursue other projects.

In January 2006, Some Girls released their first studio album, Heaven's Pregnant Teens, through Epitaph Records. With this record, the band wanted to "depart from traditional chord changes and time signatures and create something that doesn’t fit into an easily consumable format".

=== Break-up (2007) ===
Their breakup was announced in a Punknews article, published October 23, 2007. The band's former label, Deathwish Inc. went on to confirm this announcement by posting that Some Girls had "called it a day." From Deathwish Inc.'s official website:

Word from various members of Some Girls is that they have officially and quietly put the band to rest. Some Girls released music on Deathwish, 31G, and lastly Epitaph Records. The band also toured with the likes of Daughters, The Locust, Converge, and many more during their short life.

== Musical style ==
Pearson indicated that Some Girls saw the bands Daughters, The Plot to Blow Up the Eiffel Tower, Year Future, Moving Units, Cattle Decapitation, Rah Bras, and The Blood Brothers as related in style.

Their musical style was a hybrid of mathcore, grindcore and noise rock.

== Members ==
Final lineup

- Wesley Eisold – vocals (2002–2007)
- Justin Pearson – bass (2002–2007)
- Sal Gallegos III – drums (2002–2007)
- Rockey Crane – guitar (?)

Former members

- Rob Moran – guitar (2002–2005)
- Christopher Sprague – guitar (2002–2004)
- Chuck Rowell – guitar (2004–?)
- Nathan Joyner – guitar (2005–?)

Touring members

- Cody Votolato – guitar (2006)

== Discography ==
Studio albums

Title	Album details
Heaven's Pregnant Teens	Released: January 24, 2006; Label: Epitaph; Formats: CD, LP

Compilation albums

Title	Album details
All My Friends Are Going Death	Released: October 14, 2003; Label: Deathwish; Formats: CD, LP

EPs

Title	EP details
The Rains	Released: 2002; Label: Deathwish; Formats: 7"
The Blues	Released: 2002; Label: Deathwish; Formats: 7"
The DNA Will Have Its Say	Released: April 26, 2005; Label: Three One G; Formats: 7", CD

Music videos

- "I Need Drugs" (2005)
- "Bone Metal" (2006)
- "Deathface" (2007)
