= The Blues (EP) =

The Blues EP

EP by Some Girls
- Released: 2003
- Genre: Screamo; Hardcore punk
- Length: 4:07
- Label: Deathwish (DWI28)

Some Girls chronology
The Rains EP (2002)	The Blues EP (2003)	All My Friends Are Going Death (2003)

The Blues EP is the second recording by Some Girls. It was later collected on the band's 2003 compilation album All My Friends Are Going Death.

== Track listing ==
No.	Title	Length
1.	"Some Girls Have All the Fuck"	0:49
2.	"Queens Without Kings"	0:44
3.	"Blues Singer"	0:50
4.	"Aligula"	0:49
5.	"Pale Pink Vodka Veins"	0:55
