= All My Friends Are Going Death =

Compilation album by Some Girls
- Released: October 14, 2003
- Recorded: 2001–03
- Genre: Screamo, noisegrind, hardcore punk
- Length: 28:24
- Label: Deathwish (DWI29)

Some Girls chronology
The Blues EP	All My Friends Are Going Death (2003)	The DNA Will Have Its Say (2005)

Professional ratings
Review scores
Source	Rating
Allmusic	3/5 stars

All My Friends Are Going Death is a compilation album by Some Girls consisting of their first two EPs, a few new songs, and demo material. Jacob Bannon, owner of Deathwish Inc. and vocalist of Converge, designed the artwork for the album. There is a limited edition LP press of 300 copies with an alternate Death In June "When We Have Each Other We Have Everything." rip off cover. The titles for tracks 2 and 3 are reversed in the track listing on the back of the jewel disc.

== Track listing ==
No.	Title	Length
1.	"All My Friends Are Going Death"	0:56
2.	"Now Only Memories Run on Railway Tracks"	1:24
3.	"Gonna Set My Soul on Fire"	1:17
4.	"The Rains"	1:01
5.	"His N' Hers"	1:04
6.	"Up to Our Hips"	0:33
7.	"Sex and Glue"	1:07
8.	"Red Cuts Through Black Hearts"	0:51
9.	"Some Girls Have All the Fuck"	0:49
10.	"Queens Without Kings"	0:44
11.	"Blues Singer"	0:50
12.	"Aligula"	0:49
13.	"Pale Pink Vodka Veins"	0:55
14.	"No Fun"	1:40
15.	"Up to Our Hips (Again)"	0:41

Tracks 16-68 are 12 seconds each and completely silent. Track 69 is 2:28 of demo material, including demos for "His N' Hers", "Up to Our Hips", and "Sex and Glue".

Track 14, "No Fun", is a cover of The Stooges song from their self-titled debut.
