= Raging Speedhorn (album) =

Studio album by Raging Speedhorn
- Released: 14 August 2000
- Genre: Nu metal
- Length: 43:44
- Label: ZTT
- Producer: John Fryer

Raging Speedhorn chronology
| Raging Speedhorn (2000) | We Will Be Dead Tomorrow (2002) |

Professional ratings
Review scores
| Source | Rating |
|---|---|
| AllMusic | 2.5/5 stars |
| Drowned in Sound | 6/10 |
| Metal Hammer | 8/10 |

Raging Speedhorn is the debut album by the British metal band Raging Speedhorn. It features an altogether different sound when compared to the band's later albums, leaning more towards nu metal rather than the sludge metal style featured in later material.

Metal Hammer named it the seventh best album of 2000.

== Track listing ==
| No. | Title | Length |
|---|---|---|
| 1. | "Super Scud" | 2:40 |
| 2. | "Redweed" | 2:38 |
| 3. | "Knives and Faces" | 4:14 |
| 4. | "Mandan" | 3:32 |
| 5. | "Random Acts of Violence" | 6:22 |
| 6. | "Thumper" | 2:36 |
| 7. | "Necrophiliac Glue Sniffer" | 4:31 |
| 8. | "Dungeon Whippet" | 2:54 |
| 9. | "Death Row Dogs" | 7:08 |
| 10. | "High Whore" | 6:45 |
| Total length: | | 43:44 |

=== Bonus tracks (UK Enhanced Edition) ===
1. "The Gush"
2. "Thumper" (PC-CD ROM music video)

== Personnel ==
- Frank Regan - vocals
- John Loughlin - vocals
- Gareth Smith - guitar
- Tony Loughlin - guitar
- Darren Smith - bass
- Gordon Morison - drums
