= Bleached =

American pop band

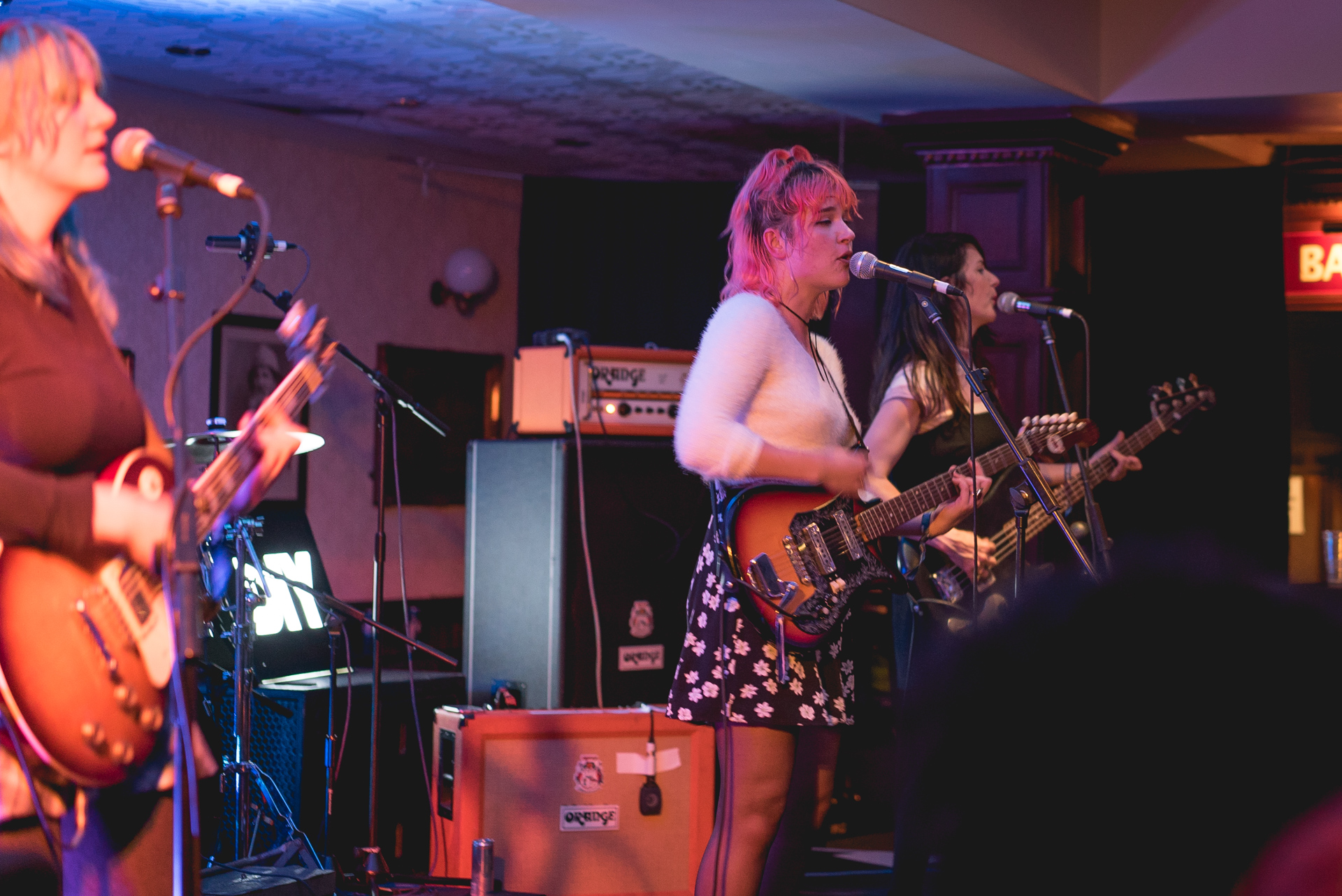
- Bleached performing at The Great Escape in May 2016.

Background information
- Origin: Los Angeles, California, United States
- Genres: Punk rock; pop; rock and roll; garage rock; indie rock; noise pop; garage punk
- Years active: 2011–present
- Labels: Dead Oceans; Suicide Squeeze
- Members: Jennifer Clavin; Jessica Clavin; Spencer Lere
- Past members: Micayla Grace; Nick Pillot
- Website: hellobleached.com

Bleached is an American pop band consisting of sisters Jennifer and Jessica Clavin, formerly of Mika Miko. The band plays a style of rock, pop, rock and roll, and indie rock. Bleached was established in Los Angeles in 2011. The group has released three studio albums, Ride Your Heart (2013), Welcome the Worms (2016) and Don't You Think You've Had Enough? (2019), all with Dead Oceans, and have charted on the Billboard charts.

== History ==
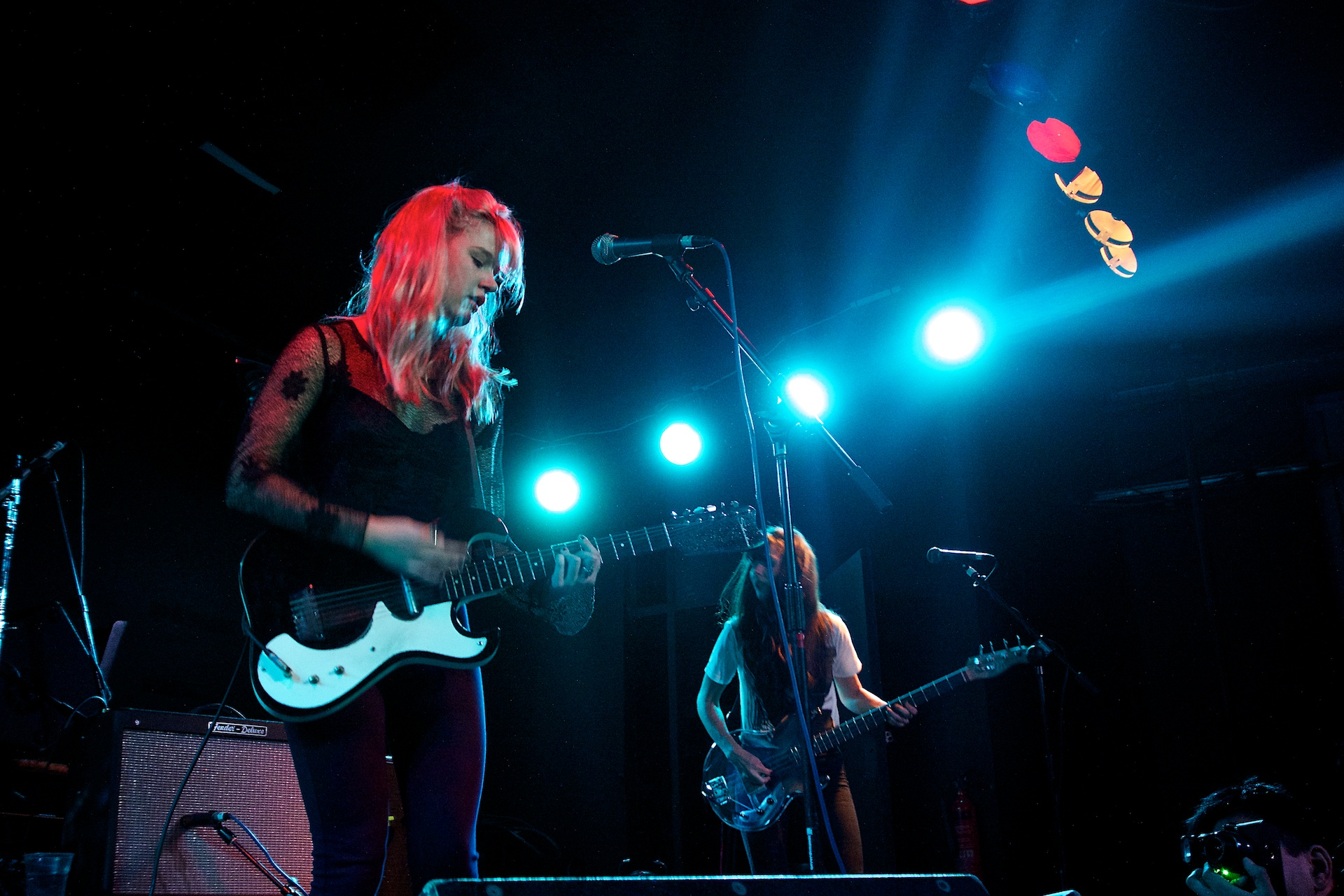
Bleached performing in London in 2013

They formed in Echo Park, Los Angeles, California during 2011, with Mika Miko front woman Jennifer Clavin and guitarist Jessica Clavin. Micayla Grace joined in 2014 as a live member and drummer Nick Pillot in 2016.

The band released three singles, Francis, Carter, and "Searching Through the Past" / "Electric Chair", soon after their formation. Their subsequent release, a studio album, Ride Your Heart, was released on April 2, 2013, by Dead Oceans. This album charted on the Billboard magazine Heatseekers Albums chart, where it peaked at No. 18. In 2014 they released an extended play, For the Feel, on Dead Oceans. The group released another studio album, Welcome the Worms, on April 1, 2016, with Dead Oceans. The album peaked on the Heatseekers Albums chart at No. 15, while it placed on the Independent Albums chart at No. 46.

== Members ==
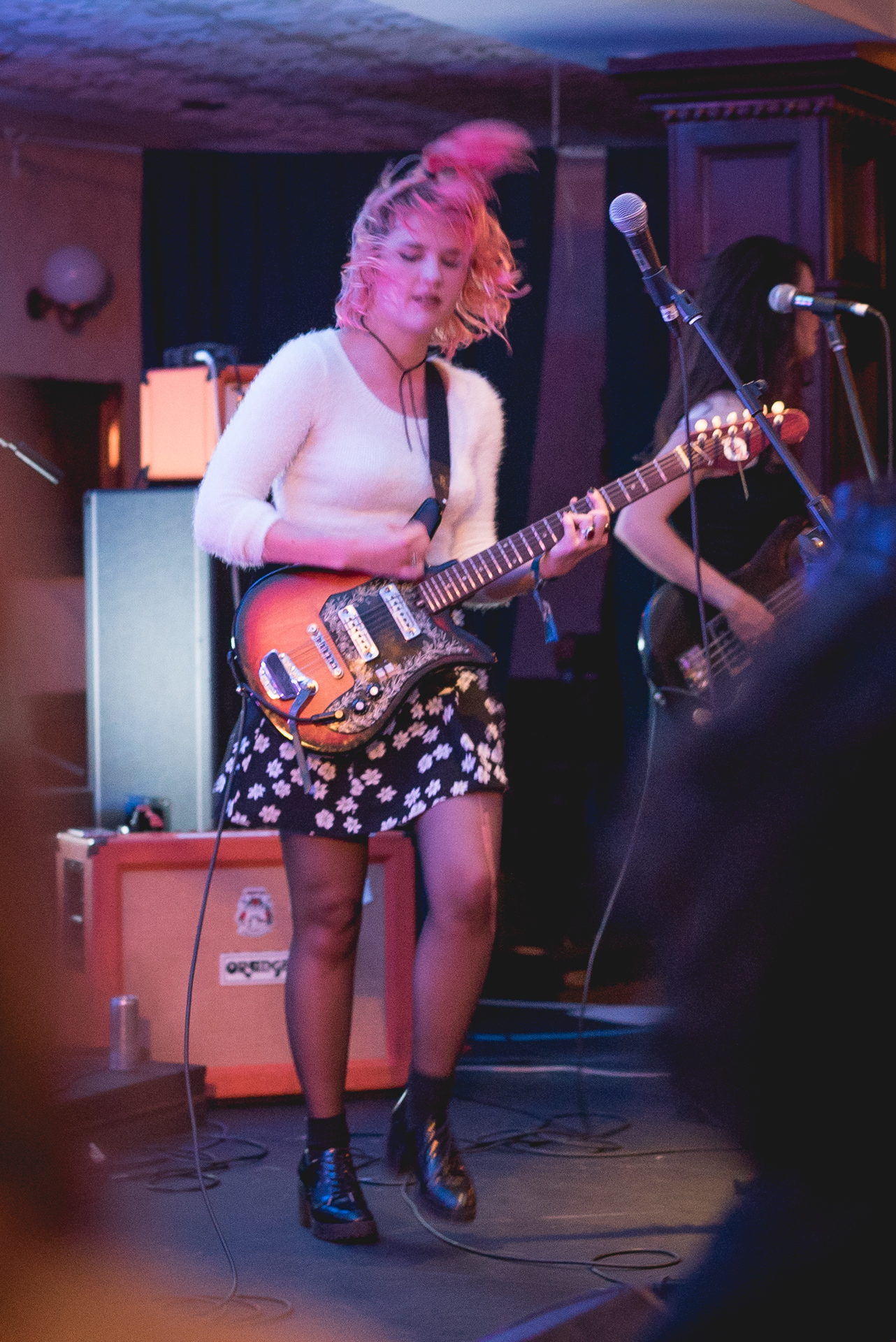
Jennifer Clavin performing with the band in May 2016

- Jennifer Clavin – lead vocals, guitar, synth
- Jessica Clavin – lead guitar, bass
- Nick Pillot – drums, percussion

== Discography ==
=== Studio albums ===
List of studio albums, with selected chart positions
| Title | Album details | Peak chart positions | |
| Title | Album details | US Heat | US Indie |
|---|---|---|---|
| Ride Your Heart | Released: April 2, 2013; Label: Dead Oceans; CD, digital download | 18 | — |
| Welcome the Worms | Released: April 1, 2016; Label: Dead Oceans; CD, digital download | 15 | 46 |
| Don't You Think You've Had Enough? | Released: July 12, 2019; Label: Dead Oceans; CD, digital download, LP, cassette | — | — |

=== EPs ===
- Carter (2011, Art Fag Recordings)
- Francis (2011, Post Present Medium)
- For the Feel (2014, Dead Oceans)
- Can You Deal? (2017, Dead Oceans)

=== Singles ===
- "Searching Through the Past" / "Electric Chair" (2011, Suicide Squeeze)
- Stupid Boys(2020, Dead Oceans)
- Jingle Bells(2020, Dead Oceans)
- Flip It (2022, Many Hats Distribution)
