= Don Giovanni Records discography =

The following is the discography of Don Giovanni Records, an independent punk label based in New Brunswick, New Jersey. In addition to music the label also publishes books and artist books.

== Releases ==
Catalog #	Artist	Title	Format	Year	Notes
DG-01	Talk Hard	Sarah Connor's Will	7-inch	2003	
DG-02	Kamikaze	Seppuku	7-inch	2004	Split release with Soul Rebel Records.
DG-03	Full Circle Swing	Full Circle Swing	7-inch	2004	Split release with 9 Volt Records. Recorded in 1998, released in 2004.
DG-04	Snakebite	Feel The Buzz	7-inch	2004	
DG-05	Talk Hard	War Journal	7-inch	2005	
DG-06	Snakebite	Every Bad Idea Is A Good Idea	7-inch	2005	
DG-07	The Degenerics	The Final Chapter	single sided 7-inch	2005	Split release with Soul Rebel Records
DG-08	The Ergs!	dorkrockcorkrod	LP	2005	Remastered in 2015 for the10th anniversary. Reissued again for the 20th anniversary, featuring a new mix from Steve Albini.
DG-09	Shape Shifter	Shape Shifter	7-inch	2005	
DG-10	Project 27	Time To Fold	7-inch	2006	
DG-11	The Measure (SA)	Historical Fiction	LP	2006	Split release with Salinas Records.
DG-12	The Ergs!	Jersey's Best Prancers	CD/12"	2006	
DG-13	For Science	Revenge For Hire	CD/LP	2006	LP version released in 2012.
DG-14	Dustheads	Tall Tales I	7-inch	2006	
DG-15	Dustheads	Tall Tales II	7-inch	2007	
DG-16	The Steinways	Rocket Surgery	7-inch	2007	
DG-17	For Science	Way Out Of Control	12-inch	2007	CD version released by It's Alive Records
DG-18	Hunchback	Pray For Scars	CD/LP	2008	
DG-20	Dustheads	Little Pieces	LP	2008	Different recording than the version on the discography CD (DG-24).
DG-21	For Science	Tomorrow's Just Another Day	LP	2007	CD released by Insubordination Records
DG-22	Hunchback	Inside/Out b/w Song For Dave Berg	7-inch single	2007	Promotional single
DG-23	The Groucho Marxists	Manifesto	LP	2009	CD released by Wrapped in Plastic Records
DG-24	Dustheads	Collected Sounds	CD	2007	
DG-25	Hellhole	Uppers/Downers	7-inch	2008	
DG-26	The Measure (SA)	Songs About People...And Fruit N' Shitl	12-inch	2008	
DG-27	The Ergs!	That's It...Bye	12-inch Single	2008	Final records released for their last show.
DG-28	Pregnant	Wanna See My Gun?	7-inch	2009	
DG-29	Screaming Females	Power Move	CD/LP	2009	
DG-30	Screaming Females	What If Someone Is Watching Their T.V.?	CD/LP	2009	Originally self-released by the band.
DG-31	Shellshag	Rumors In Disguise	CD/LP	2010	
DG-32	Black Wine	Black Wine	LP	2009	
DG-33	Screaming Females	Singles	CD	2010	Collection of previously released non-album tracks.
DG-34	Byrds Of Paradise	Omega Man	7-inch Single	2010	
DG-35	Noun	Holy Hell	CD/LP	2010	LP version released in 2012.
DG-36	Full Of Fancy	Liquid Nature + The Singles	CD	2010	LP version released by Let's Pretend Records
DG-37	Screaming Females	Castle Talk	CD/LP	2010	
DG-38	Screaming Females	Baby Teeth	CD/LP	2011	
DG-39	Byrds Of Paradise	Teenage Symphonies	LP	2011	
DG-40	Big Eyes	Why Can't I	7-inch Single	2010	
DG-41	Black Wine	Dark Energy	7-inch EP	2010	
DG-42	The Steinways	Promise It'll Never Happen Again	LP	2011	Collection of previous released non-album tracks. A split release with It's Alive Records.
DG-43	Big Eyes	Hard Life	CD/LP	2011	
DG-44	Laura Stevenson & The Cans	Sit Resist	CD/LP	2011	
DG-45	The Measure (SA)	Jersey's Best	7-inch EP	2011	Sold exclusively at their last show and The Fest
DG-46	Black Wine	Summer Of Indifference	LP	2011	
DG-47	Nuclear Santa Claust	Nuclear Santa Claust	7-inch EP	2011	
DG-47.5	Screaming Females	Fun (live) b/w Dinosaurs (Live)	7-inch Single	2011	Given away exclusively with pre-orders of Screaming Females reissues.
DG-48	Nuclear Santa Claust	Order Of The New Age	LP	2013	
DG-49	Hilly Eye	Jacob's Ladder	7-inch Single	2012	
DG-51	Waxahatchee	American Weekend	CD/LP	2012	
DG-52	Noun	Noun	7-inchEP	2012	
DG-53	Jeffrey Lewis	The Last Time I Did Acid I Went Insane	LP	2013	Originally released on CD by Rough Trade in 2003.
DG-54	Hilly Eye	Reasons To Live	CD/LP	2013	
DG-55	Screaming Females	It All Means Nothing b/w A New Kid (live)	7-inch Single	2012	Sold exclusively by the band on tour.
DG-56	Screaming Females	Ugly	CD/2×LP	2012	
DG-57	Plastic Cross	Grayscale Rainbows	LP	2012	
DG-58	Black Wine	Hollow Earth	LP	2012	
DG-59	Brick Mower	My Hateable Face	LP	2012	CD version self-released by the band.
DG-60	Shellshag	Shellshag Forever	LP	2013	
DG-62	Waxahatchee	Cerulean Salt	CD/LP	2013	
DG-63	California X	California X	CD/LP	2013	
DG-64	Stormshadow	Set On Destroy	LP	2013	
DG-65	Noun	Forgotten Grin	Cassette Tape	2013	Originally released by Total Postmodern.
DG-66	Screaming Females	Chalk Tape	Cassette Tape	2013	One time pressing of 100 copies for sale at 2013 Don Giovanni Records Showcase
DG-67	Laura Stevenson	Runner	7-inch EP	2013	
DG-68	Laura Stevenson	Wheel	CD/LP	2013	
DG-69	Vacation	Candy Waves	CD	2013	LP version released by Let's Pretend Records.
DG-70	Modern Hut	Generic Treasure	LP	2013	
DG-71	Kicking Spit	Negative Feedback	LP	2013	
DG-72	Vacation	Vacation	CD	2013	LP version released by Let's Pretend Records.
DG-73	Worriers	Cruel Optimist	12-inch EP	2013	
DG-74	Upset	She's Gone	CD/LP	2013	
DG-75	Crow Bait	Sliding Through The Halls Of Fate	CD/LP	2014	
DG-76	California X	Nights In The Dark	CD/LP	2014	
DG-77	Brick Mower	Teenage Graceland	LP	2014	
DG-78	Marvin Berry & The New Sound	Bootleg	Digital	2015	LP version self-released by band.
DG-79	Chris Gethard	My Comedy Album	LP	2014	All 500 vinyl copies personalized and sold through mail-order.
DG-80	Screaming Females	Live at the Hideout	CD/2×LP	2014	Recorded live over 2 nights at The Hideout in Chicago, IL by Steve Albini.
DG-81	Peter Stampfel	NSA Man	Digital Single	2015	
DG-82	Peter Stampfel	Better Than Expected	CD	2014	
DG-83	Tenement	Predatory Headlights	CD/2×LP	2015	
DG-84	Priests	Bodies and Control and Money and Power	CD/12" EP	2014	Split release with Sister Polygon Records.
DG-85	Black Wine	Yell Boss	LP	2014	
DG-86	Nuclear Santa Claust	Je Ne Sais Claust	LP	2015	
DG-86.5	Nuclear Santa Claust and The McRackins	Split 7-inch	Split 7-inch	2014	
DG-87	Nude Beach	77	CD/2×LP	2014	
DG-88	Screaming Females	Wishing Well	7-inch Single	2014	Sold exclusively by the band on tour.
DG-89	Screaming Females	Rose Mountain	CD/LP	2015	
DG-91	Jeffrey Lewis	It's the Ones Who've Cracked That the Light Shines Through	LP	2015	
DG-92	Mal Blum	You Look A Lot Like Me	CD/LP	2015	
DG-93	Peter Stampfel	Holiday For Strings	CD	2016	
DG-94	Downtown Boys	Full Communism	CD/LP	2015	
DG-95	The Lookouts	Spy Rock Road (and Other Stories)	CD/2×LP	2015	
DG-97	Alice	Revenge Pop	12-inch EP	2015	
DG-98	Aye Nako	The Blackest Eye	LP	2015	
DG-99	Mitski	Bury Me At Makeout Creek	CD/LP/Digital	2015	
DG-101	Vacation	Non-Person	LP	2015	
DG-102	Worriers	Imaginary Life	CD/LP	2015	
DG-103	Izzy True	Troll EP	Cassette Tape	2015	
DG-104	Noun	"Throw Your Body On The Gears And Stop The Machine With Your Blood"	LP	2015	
DG-105	Laura Stevenson	Cocksure	CD/LP	2015	
DG-106	Painted Zeros	Floriography	CD/LP	2015	CD includes Daylily EP (DG-131)
DG-107	Mitylion	Nite Flite	LP	2015	
DG-108	Shellshag	Why'd I Have To Get So High?	LP	2015	Split release with Starcleaner Records
DG-109	Roadside Graves	Acne/Ears	Digital Album	2015	
DG-110	Giant Peach	Tarantula	LP	2016	Split release with Shitty Present Records
DG-111	Big Eyes	Stake My Claim	LP	2016	
DG-112	Pinkwash	Collective Sigh	CD/LP	2016	
DG-113	Outer Spaces	A Shedding Snake	CD/LP	2016	
DG-114	Mikey Erg	Tentative Decisions	CD/LP	2016	
DG-115	Amy Klein	Fire	LP	2016	
DG-116	Alice Bag	Alice Bag	CD/LP	2016	
DG-117	Izzy True	Nope	LP	2016	
DG-118	P.S. Eliot	2007-2011	2×CD	2016	Complete Discography
DG-119	Jamie Kilstein and The Agenda	A Bit Much	CD	2016	
DG-120	Sex Stains	Sex Stains	CD/LP	2016	
DG-121	Moor Mother	Fetish Bones	CD/LP	2016	
DG-122	Sammus	Pieces In Space	CD/LP	2016	Split release with NuBlack Music
DG-123	Fake Limbs	Matronly	LP	2016	
DG-124	Erica Freas	Patient Ones	CD/LP	2016	Split release with Rumbletowne
DG-125	RVIVR	RVIVR	CD/LP/Digital	2016	Remaster. Split release with Rumbletowne
DG-126	Kissing Is A Crime	Kissing Is A Crime	LP/Digital	2017	
DG-126.5	Kissing Is A Crime	Your Secrets Are Safe With Me	Digital EP	2016	
DG-127	Finchler	Golden Rings	Digital Single	2016	
DG-128	Antibodies	Vessels	Cassette/Digital	2016	
DG-130	Secretary Legs	Summer Hiatus	Digital	2016	
DG-131	Painted Zeros	Daylily	Digital EP	2016	Collected on Floriography CD(DG-106)
DG-132	Bad Moves	Bad Moves	Cassette/Digital	2016	
DG-133	Aye Nako	Silver Haze	CD/LP/Digital	2017	
DG-134	Lee Bains III & The Glory Fires	Youth Detention	CD/2×LP/Digital	2017	
DG-135	The Degenerics	Generica	Gatefold LP/Digital	2017	Originally released in 2000 on Dead Alive Records
DG-136	What Cheer? Brigade	You Can't See Inside Of Me	CD/Digital	2017	
DG-138	La Neve	American Sounds	Cassette/Digital	2017	
DG-139	Peter Stampfel and the Atomic Meta Pagans	The Cambrian Explosion	CD/Digital	2017	
DG-140	Moor x Jewelry	Crime Waves	12-inch/Digital	2017	Limited edition of 500
DG-141	Keith Secola	Circle	CD/LP/Digital	2017	
DG-142	Kamikaze	The Spirit Of Battle	LP/Digital	2017	
DG-143	Robot Bachelor	Not The Third House Boat Record	Digital	2017	
DG-144	Light Beams	Light Beams	Cassette/Digital	2017	
DG-145	RVIVR	The Joester Sessions	CD	2017	
DG-147	RVIVR	The Beauty Between	CD	2017	
DG-149	Alice Bag & The Sissybears	Reign Of Fear	7-inch/Digital	2017	
DG-150	Weed Hounds	Double Life	Cassette/Digital	2017	
DG-151	Zenizen	Australia (Deluxe)	12-inch/Digital	2017	
DG-152	Big Huge	Cruel World	Cassette/Digital	2017	
DG-153	Dead Nation	Dead End	Digital	2017	
DG-154	Chris Gethard	Career Suicide	2×LP/Digital	2017	
DG-155	Giant Peach	But You Made Me Such A Beautiful Thing	Cassette	2018	
DG-156	Screaming Females	All At Once	3×LP/2×LP/CD/Digital	2018	
DG-157	Irreversible Entanglements	Irreversible Entanglements	CD/LP/Digital	2017	Split release with International Anthem
DG-158	Dusk	Dusk	LP/Digital	2018	
DG-159	Agua Viva	Piece Of Water	Cassette/Digital	2017	
DG-160	Luggage	Three	Cassette/Digital	2017	
DG-161	Bat Fangs	Bat Fangs	CD/LP/Digital	2017	
DG-162	Evan Greer	she/her/they/them	Digital Album	2019	
DG-163	L7	Dispatch From Mar-a-Lago	Digital	2017	
DG-164	Screaming Females	AV Club Covers	7-inch/Digital	2018	7-inch EP included as bonus with pre-order for All At Once
DG-165	Alice Bag	Blueprint	CD/LP/Digital	2018	
DG-166	Jeffrey Lewis	Works By Tuli Kupferberg (1923-2010)	CD/Digital	2018	
DG-167	Jeffrey Lewis	City & Eastern Songs	LP	2018	
DG-168	Peter Stampfel	The Ordovician Era	CD/Digital	2018	
DG-169	L7	I Came Back To Bitch	7-inch/Digital EP	2018	
DG-170	Lee Bains III + The Glory Fires	Live At The Nick	LP/Digital	2018	
DG-171	Jack Lewis' Awkward Energy	Lvov In The Streets	Cassette/Digital	2019	
DG-172	Exmaid	Fair Sex	Digital	2018	
DG-173	Roadside Graves	God Makes Junk: 2001-2016	Digital Box Set	2018	
DG-174	700 Bliss	Spa 700	Cassette/Digital	2018	
DG-175	Hprizm	Magnetic Memory	LP/Digital	2018	
DG-175.5	Hprizm	Catching A Body	Digital EP	2018	
DG-176	Ex-Vöid	Ex-Vöid	Cassette/Digital EP	2018	
DG-177	Bad Moves	Tell No One	CD/LP/Digital	2018	
DG-178	Weakened Friends	Common Blah	CD/LP/Digital	2018	
DG-179	APositsia Orchestra	Spaceship Earth	CD/Digital	2019	
DG-180	Blizzard Babies	Missing Time	Cassette/Digital	2018	
DG-181	Nato Coles and The Blue Diamond Band	Flyover	LP/Digital	2019	
DG-182	Izzy True	Sad Bad	Digital	2018	
DG-183	Mourning [A] BLKstar	Reckoning	LP/Digital	2019	
DG-184	Fat Tony	10,000 Hours	CD/Digital	2018	
DG-185	Mikey Erg	Waxbuilt Castles	CD/LP/Digital	2019	
DG-186	Laura Stevenson	The Big Freeze	CD/LP/Digital	2019	
DG-187	Mal Blum	Pity Boy	CD/LP/Digital	2019	7-inch Bonus EP included with early orders
DG-188	Screaming Females	Singles Too	CD/LP/Digital	2019	Singles Collection
DG-189	Jeffrey Lewis	Bad Wiring	CD/LP/Digital	2019	Co-release with Moshi Moshi Records
DG-190	Moor Mother	Analog Fluids Of Sonic Black Holes	CD/LP/Digital	2019	
DG-191	Keith Secola	Portals	CD/Digital	2021	
DG-192	Ex-Vöid	Only One	Digital	2019	
DG-193	She/Her/Hers	Kill The Boyband	Digital EP	2019	
DG-194	Roadside Graves	That's Why We're Running Away	Digital Album	2020	
DG-195	Chris Gethard	Taylor Ham, Egg, and Cheese	Digital	2019	
DG-196	Nana Grizol	South Somewhere Else	CD/LP/Digital	2020	Co-release with Arrowhawk Records
DG-197	Moor Mother	Circuit City	CD/LP/Digital	2020	
DG-198	Moor Jewelry	True Opera	LP/Digital	2020	
DG-199	Lee Bains & The Glory Fires	2-4-6-8 Motorway	Digital EP	2020	
DG-201	Mourning [A] BLKstar	The Cycle	CD/2xLP/Digital	2020	
DG-202	Irreversible Entanglements	Who Sent You?	CD/LP/Digital	2020	Co-release with International Anthem
DG-203	Painted Zeros	When You Found Forever	LP/Digital	2020	
DG-204	Light Beams	Self Help	Digital	2020	
DG-205	Paisley Fields	Electric Park Ballroom	CD/LP/Digital	2020	
DG-206	Supercrush	SODO Pop	CD/LP/Cassette/Digital	2020	
DG-207	Bad Moves	Untenable	CD/LP/Digital	2020	
DG-209	Up Around The Sun	Self Taught	LP/Digital	2022	
DG-211	Teenage Halloween	Teenage Halloween	LP/Digital	2020	
DG-212	Peter Stampfel and The Bottle Caps	Demo '84	Digital	2020	
DG-213	Speed Stick	Volume One	CD/LP/Digital	2020	
DG-214	Evan Greer	Spotify Is Surveillance	Cassette/Digital	2020	Co-release with Get Better Records
DG-215	Moor Jewelry	True Opera	LP/Cassette/Digital	2020	
DG-216	Moor Mother And Nicole Mitchell	Offering	CD/Digital	2020	
DG-217	Longings	Dreams In Red	LP/Digital	2023	
DG-218	Spitboy	Body Of Work (1990-1995)	2×LP/Digital	2021	Benefit for the National Women's Law Center.
DG-219	Ronnie Vega	Discography	Digital	2020	
DG-220	Vitamin	Recordings 1981	LP/Digital	2021	
DG-221	Cherokee Rose	Buckskin	CD/LP/Digital	2022	
DG-222	Cherokee Rose	To All The Wild Horses	CD/Digital	2022	
DG-223	The Du-Tels	No Knowledge Of Music Required	CD/Digital	2022	
DG-224	The Holy Modal Rounders	Bird Song: Live 1971	Digital	2022	
DG-225	ọmọlólù	laiii 222 rest ooo: blx ancestral sonix salves	Cassette/Digital	2020	
DG-226	The Holy Modal Rounders	Indian War Whoop	CD/2×LP/Digital	2022/2023	
DG-227	The Holy Modal Rounders	Live In 1965	CD/Digital	2022	
DG-228	Modern Hut	I Don't Want To Get Adjusted To This World	LP/Digital	2020	
DG-229	The Potatomen	Now	Digital	2020	
DG-229.5	The Potatomen	On The Avenue	Digital	2020	
DG-229.6	The Potatomen	The Beautiful & Damned	Digital	2020	
DG-230	The Potatomen	Iceland	Digital	2020	
DG-230.5	The Potatomen	All My Yesteryears	Digital	2020	
DG-231	The Potatomen	Toytown	Digital	2020	
DG-231.5	The Potatomen	Demo Tape	Digital	2020	
DG-232	Anna Fox Rochinski	Cherry	CD/LP/Digital	2021	
DG-233	Weakened Friends	Quitter	CD/LP/Digital	2021	
DG-235	Moor Mother and Olof Melander	ANTHOLOGIA 01	Cassette/Digital	2020	
DG-236	Swamp Dogg	I Need a Job...So I Can Buy More Auto-Tune	CD/LP/Digital	2022	
DG-237	Peter Stampfel & The Dysfunctionelles	Not In Our Wildest Dreams	Digital	2020	
DG-238	St. Lenox	Ten Songs of Worship and Praise for our Tumultuous Times	LP/Digital	2021	Co-release with Anyway Records
DG-239	Laura Stevenson	Laura Stevenson	CD/LP/Digital	2021	
DG-240	Winterhawk	Electric Warriors	CD/Digital	2021	
DG-241	Winterhawk	Dog Soldier	CD/Digital	2021	
DG-242	Izzy True	Our Beautiful Baby World	LP/Digital	2021	
DG-243	Dead Best	Dead Best	LP/Digital	2021	
DG-244	Bat Fangs	Queen Of My World	CD/LP/Digital	2021	
DG-245	Bad Bad Hats	Walkman	CD/LP/Digital	2021	
DG-246	model home	both feet en th infinite	LP/Digital	2021	
DG-247	Marissa Paternoster	Peace Meter	CD/LP/Digital	2021	
DG-248	R. Ring	War Poems/We Rested	CD/LP/Digital	2023	
DG-249	She/Her/Hers	She/Her/Hers	CD/Digital	2022	
DG-250	Lavender Country	Blackberry Rose	CD/LP/Digital	2022	
DG-251	Mikey Erg	Love At Leeds	CD/LP/Digital	2022	
DG-252	Irreversible Entanglements	Open the Gates (Irreversible Entanglements album)	CD/2×LP/Digital	2021	Co-release with International Anthem
DG-253	Roadside Graves	I Won't Cry Alone	Digital	2023	
DG-254	Jenny Mae	What's Wrong With Me?	LP/Digital	2022	Split release with Anyway Records
DG-256	Kari Faux	Lowkey Superstar (Deluxe)	CD/LP/Digital	2021	Co-release with Lowkey Superstar Records
DG-257	Lee Bains & The Glory Fires	Old-Time Folks	CD/2×LP/Digital	2022	
DG-258	Supercrush	Melody Maker EP	CD/12" EP/Digital	2022	Co-release with KR Records
DG-259	Choked Up	Dichoso Corazon	CD/Digital	2021	
DG-260	Choked Up	Mala Lengua EP	12-inch EP/Digital	2022	
DG-261	Paisley Fields	Plastic Rosary	LP/Digital	2022	
DG-262	Ex-Vöid	Bigger Than Before	CD/LP/Digital	2022	Co-release with Prefect Records
DG-263	Franz Nicolay	New River	LP/Digital	2022	
DG-264	Screaming Females	Clover EP	CD/Cassette	2022	
DG-265	Teenage Halloween	Split	12-inch/Digital	2022	
DG-266	The Sad Tomorrows	The Sad Tomorrows	Cassette/Digital	2022	
DG-268	The Homeless Gospel Choir	Fourth Dimension Intervention	CD/LP/Digital	2022	
DG-269	The Homeless Gospel Choir	Curt Large Demos	LP/Digital	2022	
DG-270	Wildernauts	Wildernauts	CD/Digital	2024	Peter Stampfel, Eli Smith, Walker Shepard
DG-271	Jody Stecher & Krishna Bhatt	Rasa	CD/LP/Digital	2023	
DG-274	The Maglory Dengluch	The Maglory Dengluch	2×CD/LP/Digital	2023	
DG-275	Butchamana and the Big Bang Brothers Band	Indian Dream	LP/Digital	2023	
DG-276	Screaming Females	Desire Pathway	CD/LP/Digital	2023	
DG-277	Mose McCormack	Angel Of Mercy	CD/Digital	2022	
DG-279	Dead Best	Second	LP/Digital	2023	
DG-281	John Wagner	Moments...New Mexico Style	CD/Digital	2022	
DG-283	The Brass	Four Songs	Digital	2022	
DG-284	The Maglory Dengluch	Back From The Dead	Digital	2023	CD version compiled on CD-274 2×CD
DG-285	Speed Stick	Fringe Matter	Cassette/Digital	2023	Recorded Live at Fringe MAtter
DG-286	Rodeo Boys	Home Movies	CD/LP/Digital	2023	
DG-287	Kym Register + Meltdown Rodeo	Meltdown Rodeo	LP/Digital	2023	
DG-288	The London Experimental Ensemble	Child Ballads: The Final Six	2xLP/Digital	2023	with Richard Thompson, Wesley Stace, Sivert Høyem, Marissa Nadler and Gina Fergione
DG-289	Sug Daniels	When I'm Gone	Digital Single	2023	
DG-290	Maura Weaver	I Was Due For A Heartbreak	LP/Digital	2023	
DG-291	Dusk	Glass Pastures	LP/Digital	2023	
DG-292	Teenage Halloween	Till You Return	CD/LP/Cassette/Digital	2023	
DG-293	Bad Bad Hats	Bad Bad Hats	CD/LP/Digital	2024	
DG-294	Jody Stecher with Mile Twelve	Mile 77	CD/Digital	2023	
DG-295	Kind Beast	Dirty Realism	LP/Digital	2023	
DG-296	Ackley-Chen-Centazzo-DeGruttola-Kaiser-Manring	Two Views of Steve Lacy’s The Wire	CD/Digital	2024	
DG-297	Emily Frembgen	No Hard Feelings	LP/Digital	2024	
DG-299	Mourning [A] BLKstar	Ancient//Future	Cassette/Digital	2024	
DG-302	Bad Moves	Wearing Out The Refrain	LP/CD/Digital	2024	
DG-303	St. Lenox	Ten Modern American Work Songs	LP/Digital	2024	
DG-304	Jody Stecher with Mile Twelve	Instant Lonesome and the Twinkle Brigade	CD/Digital	2024	
DG-305	Modem	Megalomania	LP/CD/Digital	2024	
DG-307	Song People	Like Somebody Calling Your Name	CD/Digital	2024	
DG-311	Mechanical Canine	To My Chagrin	LP/CD/Cassette/Digital	2024	

== Books published by Don Giovanni Records ==
Catalog #	Author	Title	Format	Year	Notes
DG-61	Larry Livermore	Spy Rock Memories	Paperback Book / Hardcover Book	2013	
	Marissa Paternoster	My Body Is A Prison/My Mind Is A Disease	Paperback Book	2013	Artist book limited to 500 copies.
	Lauren Denitzio	How Do You Like What You Have.	Paperback Book	2014	Artist book limited to 500 copies.
DG-90	Faye Orlove	SHRINE	Paperback Book	2015	Artist book limited to 200 copies.
	Marissa Paternoster	Naked Under The Arch	Paperback Book	2015	Artist book limited to 500 copies.
	Leslie Paternoster	Leslie	Paperback Book	2015	Artist book limited to 100 copies. Compiled by Marissa Paternoster.
DG-96	Larry Livermore	How To Ru(i)n A Record Label	Paperback Book / Hardcover Book	2015	
DG-129	Liz Pelly	P.S. Eliot: 2007-2011 Oral History	Zine	2016	
DG-137	Faye Orlove	SHRINE II	Paperback Book	2016	Artist book limited to 200 copies.
DG-208	Tim Kerr	Self Taught	Paperback Book	2021	Artist book
DG-210	Bela Koe-Krompecher	Love, Death & Photosynthesis	Paperback Book	2021	
DG-234	Peter Stampfel	Stampfel on Weber and The Complete Boston Broadsides 1964-1967	Paperback Book	2023	140 page paperback book containing every essay Peter Stampfel wrote for the Boston Broadside, and two essays on Steve Weber
DG-300	Joe Steinhardt & Marissa Paternoster	Merriment	Graphic Novel	2024	
