= List of Don Giovanni Records artists =

The following is a list of artists, past and present, who have had recordings released on the Don Giovanni Records label:

== Artists ==
- 700 Bliss
- Agua Viva
- Alice
- Atom And His Package
- Aye Nako
- Alice Bag
- Bad Bad Hats
- Bad Moves
- Bat Fangs
- Lee Bains & The Glory Fires
- Big Eyes
- Black Wine
- Blizzard Babies
- Mal Blum
- Brick Mower
- Byrds Of Paradise
- California X
- Cherokee Rose
- Choked Up
- Nato Coles and the Blue Diamond Band
- Sug Daniels
- Dead Best
- The Degenerics
- Downtown Boys
- Dusk
- Dustheads
- Mikey Erg
- The Ergs!
- Ex-Vöid
- Exmaid
- Fake Limbs
- Fat Tony
- Kari Faux
- For Science
- Erica Freas
- Full Of Fancy
- Chris Gethard
- Giant Peach
- Evan Greer
- The Groucho Marxists
- Hellhole
- Hilly Eye
- The Homeless Gospel Choir
- Hprizm
- Hunchback
- Irreversible Entanglements
- Izzy True
- Jeffrey Lewis
- Kamikaze
- Kissing Is A Crime
- Amy Klein
- Laura Stevenson
- Larry Livermore
- Lavender Country
- L7
- Light Beams
- The London Experimental Ensemble
- Longings
- The Lookouts
- Luggage
- Jenny Mae
- Marvin Berry & the New Sound
- The Measure (SA)
- Nicole Mitchell
- Mitski
- Modern Hut
- Moor Mother
- Moor Jewelry
- Mourning [A] BLKstar
- Nana Grizol
- Franz Nicolay
- Noun
- Nude Beach
- Nuclear Santa Claust
- Omololu
- Outer Spaces
- Painted Zeros
- Paisley Fields
- Pinkwash
- Plastic Cross
- Priests
- Pregnant
- Project 27
- P.S. Eliot
- R. Ring
- Kym Register + Meltdown Rodeo
- Roadside Graves
- Anna Fox Rochinski
- Rodeo Boys
- Rubber Molding
- RVIVR
- The Sad Tomorrows
- Sammus
- Keith Secola
- Sex Stains
- Screaming Females
- Shape Shifter
- She/Her/hers
- Snakebite
- Song People
- Speed Stick
- Shellshag
- St. Lenox
- Peter Stampfel
- Jody Stecher
- The Steinways
- Stormshadow
- Supercrush
- Swamp Dogg
- Talk Hard
- Tenement
- Teenage Halloween
- Up Around The Sun
- Upset
- Vacation
- Waxahatchee
- Weakened Friends
- Maura Weaver
- Winterhawk
- Worriers
- Zenizen

== See also ==
- Don Giovanni Records
