= Reasons to Live =

Reasons to Live may refer to:

- Reasons to Live (album), a 2013 album by Hilly Eye
- "Reasons to Live", a 2008 song by DragonForce from Ultra Beatdown
- "Reasons to Live", a 2022 song by Pale Waves from Unwanted
- Reasons to Live, a 1985 short-story collection by Amy Hempel

== See also ==
- A Reason to Live (disambiguation)
- "Reason to Live", a 1987 song by Kiss from Crazy Nights
- "Reason to Live", a 2001 song by Gotthard from the album Homerun
