= My Comedy Album =

Studio album by Chris Gethard
- Released: 22 April 2014
- Genre: Comedy
- Length: 44:02
- Label: Don Giovanni Records

My Comedy Album is the debut album by comedian Chris Gethard. The album was released on April 22, 2014, by Don Giovanni Records.

== Track listing ==
1. Alan Rickman 11:17
2. Lesbian Girlfriend 1:09
3. I Survived (This Is A Joke About Advertising) 7:13
4. J Crew vs. Punk Rock 2:58
5. The Animal Game 2:40
6. Mother's Day 2:36
7. Bonnaroo 9:52
8. Conclusion 1:06
9. Crying at the Wawa (feat. Mal Blum) 5:11

== Reception ==
The A.V. Club named the album one of the best comedy albums of 2014. It also received a 9.2/10 from Paste Magazine
