= John Faye =

- Born: November 21, 1966 (age 59)
- Origin: Newark, Delaware
- Genres: Rock, Alternative rock, Pop rock
- Years active: 1989–present
- Labels: A&M Records, It Keeps Evolving Records

John Faye (born 1966) is a singer-songwriter from Newark, Delaware. John first rose to the spotlight as front man of The Caulfields, who were signed to A&M Records from 1995 to 1997. He has also been involved with a few other projects in the Philadelphia area, most notably with IKE and as half of the duo John & Brittany from 2011 until their final show on October 17, 2014. John attended the University of Delaware and graduated with a degree in English. John's new backing band goes by the name "Those Meddling Kids".

== Discography ==
John Faye/Solo

- Meddling Kid (2015)

With The Caulfields

- Whirlgig (1995)
- L (1997)
- B-Sides and Rarities 1993–1997 (2005)

With Sug Daniels

- Lightning In A Bottle (2022)

With John & Brittany

- John & Brittany (EP) (2011)
- Start Sinning (2013)
- Crookedletta, Crookedletta (2013)
- Stories to be Told (EP) (2014)

With IKE

- Parallel Universe (2003)
- Bumper Sticker Wisdom (DVD)(2004)
- In Real Life (2005)
- Where to Begin (2008)
- Tie The Knot With All That You Got (2009)
- The Little People, Church & The Steeple (2011)
- The Other Shoe Always Drops (Benefit Single – 2013)

With John Faye Power Trip

- John Faye Power Trip (1999)
