= Holy Hell =

Holy Hell may refer to:

- Holy Hell (Rob Rock album), 2005
- Holy Hell (Noun album), 2010
- Holy Hell (Architects album), 2018
- Holy Hell (film), a 2016 documentary film about the Buddhafield cult
- "Holy Hell", a 1985 song by Possessed from the album Seven Churches
- Holy Hell: A Memoir of Faith, Devotion, and Pure Madness, a memoir by Gail Tredwell
