= Untenable =

Studio album by Bad Moves
- Released: June 26, 2020
- Studio: Headroom Studios, Philadelphia, USA
- Label: Don Giovanni

Bad Moves chronology
Tell No One (2018)	Untenable (2020)	Wearing Out The Refrain (2024)

Untenable is the second studio album by American power pop band Bad Moves. It was originally scheduled for release on May 29, 2020 under Don Giovanni Records but the release date was later delayed until June 26, 2020.

The first single from the album, "Party with the Kids Who Wanna Party with You" was released on April 7, 2020. The second single "End of Time" was released on May 5, 2020. The third single "Cape Henlopen" was released on May 28, 2020.

== Background ==
The album was recorded in late-2019 at Headroom Studios in Philadelphia, Pennsylvania with Hop Along member Joe Reinhart.

== Track listing ==
Untenable track listing
No.	Title	Length
1.	"Local Radio"	2:39
2.	"Night Terrors"	2:39
3.	"Party with the Kids Who Wanna Party with You"	3:55
4.	"Cape Henlopen"	3:32
5.	"Toward Crescent Park"	3:29
6.	"Working for Free"	3:04
7.	"Muster"	2:43
8.	"Fog Is a Funny Thing"	2:54
9.	"Same Bad Friends"	2:46
10.	"Settle into It"	2:57
11.	"Tides"	2:25
12.	"End of Time"	3:17
