= Stormshadow =

Stormshadow or Storm Shadow or variant, may refer to:

- Storm Shadow, a British-French cruise missile
- Storm Shadow (G.I. Joe), a fictional ninja character, member of COBRA, in the G.I. Joe fictional universe
  - Storm Shadow (comics), a comic book featuring the G.I. Joe character
- "Storm Shadow", a song by 'Omar Rodríguez-López' off the album Unicorn Skeleton Mask, rereleased as "Random Bouts of Shadows" on the album Zapopan
- Stormshadow, an artist signed to Don Giovanni Records; see List of Don Giovanni Records artists
