= A Reason to Live =

A Reason to Live may refer to:

- A Reason to Live (1985 film), an American drama film
- A Reason to Live (2009 film), a documentary film about teen and young adult depression and suicide
- A Reason to Live (2011 film), a South Korean film
- A Reason to Live (album), 1993, by Cindy Morgan
- Reason to Live (album), 2021, by Lou Barlow
- Reason to Live, a 2002 album by Sixty Watt Shaman
- "Reason to Live", a 1987 song by Kiss
- Reason to Live (album), 2021, by Lou Barlow
- "Reason to Live", a 2001 song by Gotthard from the album Homerun

== See also ==
- Reasons to Live (disambiguation)
