= Collective Sigh =

Studio album by Pinkwash
- Released: May 13, 2016
- Genre: punk
- Length: 38:12
- Label: Don Giovanni Records

Professional ratings
Review scores
Source	Rating
Rolling Stone	3.5/5 stars
The New York Times	favorable

Collective Sigh is the debut album by Pinkwash released on Don Giovanni Records in 2016.

== Track listing ==
1. "No Real Witness"
2. "Longer Now"
3. "Metastatic"
4. "Gumdrop"
5. "The Brevity Is Unkind"
6. "Burning Too"
7. "Sigh"
8. "Space Dust"
9. "Halfmoon"
10. "Walk Forward With My Eyes Closed"
