= 77 (Nude Beach album) =

Studio album by Nude Beach
- Released: October 21, 2014
- Genre: Indie rock, punk
- Length: 68:39
- Label: Don Giovanni Records
- Producer: Chuck Betz

Nude Beach chronology
II (2012)	77 (2014)

Professional ratings
Aggregate scores
Source	Rating
Metacritic	(77/100)
Review scores
Source	Rating
Pitchfork Media	(6.9/10)
Rolling Stone	3.5/5 stars
Allmusic	4/5 stars
Wondering Sound	4/5 stars

77 is a double album and third full-length album by Nude Beach released on Don Giovanni Records in 2014.

== Track listing ==
- All songs written and produced by Chuck Betz

No.	Title	Length
1.	"Used To It"	2:37
2.	"I'm Not Like You"	3:07
3.	"Yesterday"	3:27
4.	"Time"	4:42
5.	"See My Way"	2:55
6.	"For A While"	2:26
7.	"For You"	2:44
8.	"I Can't Keep The Tears From Falling"	3:02
9.	"Geoffrey's Tune"	1:52
10.	"On The One Too Many's"	3:40
11.	"It's So Hard"	1:31
12.	"Can't Get Enough"	4:01
13.	"Changes"	6:24
14.	"It's So Hard To Love You"	4:56
15.	"The Witness"	4:27
16.	"Set Me Free"	3:16
17.	"I Found You"	10:02
18.	"If We Only Had The Time"	3:30
Total length:		68:39

== Personnel ==
- Chuck Betz - vocals, guitar, harpsichord, producer
- Jim Shelton - bass
- Ryan Naideau - drums, percussion, vocals
- Andrea Schiavelli - fender rhodes (tracks 1,4, & 18)
- Matthew Winn - harmonica (track 17), vocals (track 13)
- Dave Rahn - mastering
- Alex Decarli - artwork
