= Walkman (album) =

Studio album by Bad Bad Hats
- Released: September 21, 2021
- Genres: Indie rock; pop-punk
- Length: 31:32
- Label: Don Giovanni Records
- Producer: Brett Bullion

Bad Bad Hats chronology
Lightning Round (2018)	Walkman (2021)

Professional ratings
Review scores
Source	Rating
The A.V. Club	favorable
The Current	favorable
Paste	7.8/10

Walkman is the third studio album by Bad Bad Hats. It was released on September 17, 2021, via Don Giovanni Records. The album was named album of the week upon release by The Current, and one of the best albums of the month by Paste

== Track listing ==
No.	Title	Length
1.	"Walkman"	2:58
2.	"Detroit Basketball"	2:27
3.	"Always on Time"	3:00
4.	"Gloria Love"	2:53
5.	"Priority"	5:23
6.	"Quarter Past"	3:18
7.	"Milky Way"	2:33
8.	"Only Static"	2:57
9.	"Awkward Phase"	3:06
10.	"Year of the Crab"	3:02
Total length:		31:32
