= The Blackest Eye =

EP by Aye Nako
- Released: July 10, 2015
- Genre: Indie rock, punk
- Length: 22:52
- Label: Don Giovanni Records

Aye Nako chronology
Unleash Yourself (2013)	The Blackest Eye (2015)	Silver Haze (2017)

Professional ratings
Review scores
Source	Rating
Pitchfork Media	7.8/10
New York Times	Favorable
Punknews	3.5/5 stars

The Blackest Eye is an EP by the American punk rock band Aye Nako.

== Track listing ==
All songs by Aye Nako.

No.	Title	Length
1.	"Leaving The Body"	3:34
2.	"Killswitch"	3:28
3.	"Human Shield"	2:55
4.	"White Noise"	4:02
5.	"Worms"	3:30
6.	"Sick Fuck"	5:26
Total length:		22:52

== Personnel ==
- Mars Ganito – Vocals, Guitar
- Joe McCann - Bass guitar
- Jade Payne - Guitar
- Angie Boylan - Drums
