= Bad Moves =

American power pop band

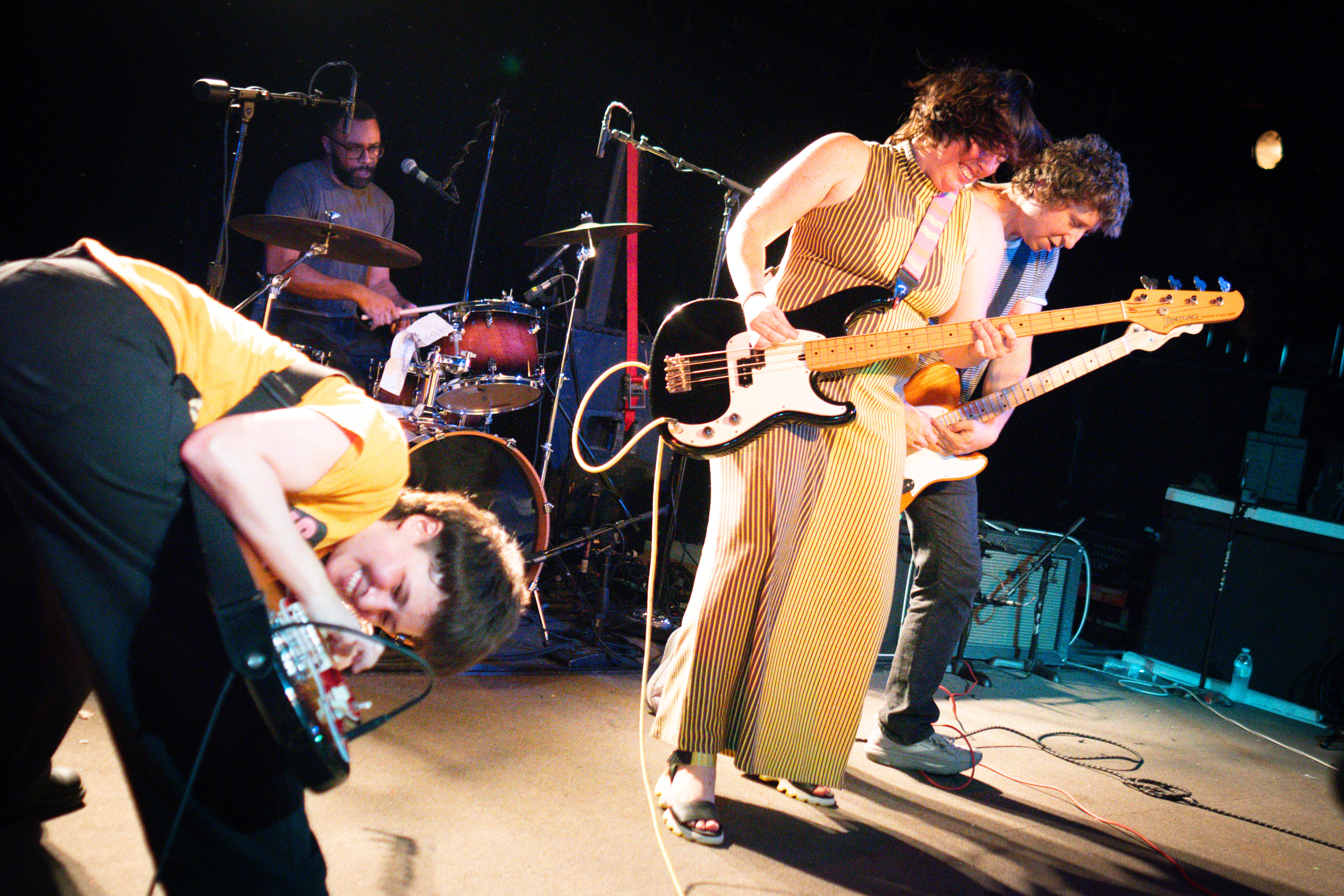
- Bad Moves playing their final show at Black Cat in Washington, DC, 2025

Background information
- Origin: Washington, D.C.
- Genres: Power pop
- Years active: 2015–2025
- Labels: Don Giovanni Records
- Members: Emma Cleveland; David Combs; Katie Park; Daoud Tyler-Ameen
- Website: badmoves.bandcamp.com

Bad Moves were an American power pop band from Washington, D.C. They formed in 2015, and released three albums and one EP on independent label Don Giovanni Records. The band consisted of David Combs (The Max Levine Ensemble, Spoonboy, Somnia, Dim Wizard), Katie Park (Hemlines), Daoud Tyler-Ameen (Art Sorority) and Emma Cleveland. They ended the project amicably after a final tour in 2025.

== History ==
Bad Moves released a self-titled debut EP in 2016 on Don Giovanni Records. In May 2017 they supported Scottish band The Spook School on a partial UK tour. In mid to late April and early May 2018 they, along with Martha of England, supported Jeff Rosenstock for the Northeastern and Midwestern leg of his US tour.

They went on to record their first full-length album Tell No One at Philadelphia's Headroom Studio with Joe Reinhart of Hop Along. This was released September 21, 2018, also on Don Giovanni Records, after which the band toured with The Obsessives, Nana Grizol, and Lee Bains III and the Glory Fires.

On July 9, 2018, the band guest-starred in "Vulture's Nest", an episode of the Cartoon Network animated series Craig of the Creek.

Half the band have volunteered at rock music youth coaching programs. Combs volunteered for a few summers at Queer Rock Camp in Olympia, Washington, and Park has been a band coach and worked with Girls Rock! DC.

On April 7, 2020, the band announced their second album Untenable, again on Don Giovanni, would be released later that spring. They simultaneously revealed the first single from it, "Party with the Kids Who Wanna Party with You". The album was fully released on June 26, 2020.

On December 19, 2023, the band released the single New Year's Reprieve. Their goal with this album was to add more pessimistic holiday songs.

The quartet released its third album, Wearing Out the Refrain, on September 13, 2024. They promoted its release with a show in Washington, D.C. on October 27 with openers Ekko Astral and Perennial. A short tour playing in Philadelphia and Brooklyn also followed.

On March 18, 2025, the band announced that they would be amicably parting ways and announced farewell tour dates for summer 2025.

Combs now makes music under the name Dim Wizard.

== Personnel ==
- Emma Cleveland: Bass, Vocals
- David Combs: Guitar, Vocals
- Katie Park: Guitar, Vocals
- Daoud Tyler-Ameen: Drums, Vocals

== Discography ==
=== Studio albums ===
- Tell No One (Don Giovanni Records) (2018)
- Untenable (Don Giovanni Records) (2020)
- Wearing Out the Refrain (Don Giovanni Records) (2024)

=== EPs ===
- Bad Moves (Don Giovanni Records) (2016)

=== Singles ===
- "Cool Generator" (Don Giovanni Records) (2018)
- "One Thing" (Don Giovanni Records) (2018)
- "Spirit FM" (Don Giovanni Records) (2018)
- "Crushed Out" (Don Giovanni Records) (2018)
- "Party With The Kids Who Wanna Party With You" (Don Giovanni Records) (2020)
- "New Year's Reprieve" (Don Giovanni Records) (2023)
- "Let the Rats Inherit the Earth" (2024)
- "Hallelujah" (2024)
- "Outta My Head" (2024)
