= Aye Nako =

American punk band

- Origin: Brooklyn, New York, U.S.
- Genres: Punk rock
- Years active: 2010–present
- Label: Don Giovanni
- Members: Mars Ganito; Joe McCann; Jade Payne; Sheena McGrath
- Past members: Angie Boylan

Aye Nako is an American punk band from Brooklyn, New York, United States. The band originated in 2010 and promotes a "community-oriented, anti-capitalist, LGBTQ-friendly ideology". After self-releasing a well-received debut album titled Unleash Yourself, in 2015, the band released The Blackest Eye on Don Giovanni Records.

== History ==
Officially formed in Brooklyn, New York, in 2010, the members of Aye Nako were from Oakland, California, where Mars Ganito (vocals, guitar) and Joe McCann (bass) had been two-thirds of Fleabag, who had changed their name from Aye Nako. After the move to Brooklyn, Ganito and McCann were joined by Jade Payne (guitar) and Angie Boylan (drums) to complete their lineup.

They have performed with acts such as P.S. Eliot and the Thermals. Their self-released debut album, Unleash Yourself, came out in the summer of 2013. The band signed to Don Giovanni Records in 2015 for the release of The Blackest Eye EP. Returning to the studio in 2016, the group recorded its second full-length, Silver Haze. Released once again by Don Giovanni, the album came out in early 2017.

== Discography ==
=== Albums ===
Year	Title	Label	Format
2013	Unleash Yourself	self-released	12" vinyl LP
2017	Silver Haze	Don Giovanni Records	CD/LP/Digital

=== EPs ===
Year	Title	Label	Format
2015	The Blackest Eye	Don Giovanni Records	12" vinyl, Digital
