= 2007–2011 =

Compilation album by P.S. Eliot
- Released: September 2, 2016
- Genre: Punk
- Length: 139:00
- Label: Don Giovanni Records

P.S. Eliot chronology
Sadie (2011)	2007–2011 (2016)

2007–2011 is a compilation album by P.S. Eliot released in 2016 on Don Giovanni Records. It compiles every song recorded and released by the band during their time together along with previously unreleased demo versions.

Pitchfork named the collection Best New Reissue.

Professional ratings
Review scores
Source	Rating
Exclaim!	8/10
Mother Jones	(favorable)
Pitchfork	8.2/10
Under the Radar	7.5/10

== Track listing ==
=== Disc One ===
1. Tennessee
2. we'd never agree
3. hail mary
4. incoherent love songs
5. augustus
6. like how you are
7. tangible romance
8. tonight
9. the cyborg
10. zoroaster
11. sore subject
12. troubled medium
13. talk
14. cross eyed
15. sadie
16. asphalt
17. pink sheets
18. untitled
19. shitty & tragic
20. jesus christ
21. peach
22. diana
23. dead letters
24. mood ring
25. watch on mute

=== Disc Two ===
1. broken record
2. cry uncle
3. acid flashbacks
4. dark
5. bear named otis
6. broken record
7. entendre
8. like how you are
9. tonight
10. troubled medium
11. cross eyed (demo)
12. incoherent love songs (demo)
13. asphalt (demo)
14. hail mary (demo)
15. cry uncle (demo)
16. the cyborg (demo)
17. tangible romance (demo)
18. jesus christ (demo)
19. dead letters (demo)
20. bear named otis (demo)
21. untitled (demo)
22. diana (demo)
23. watch on mute (demo)
24. sore subject (demo)
25. zoroaster (demo)
