= California X (album) =

Studio album by California X
- Released: January 15, 2013
- Genre: Indie rock, punk rock, hard rock
- Length: 33:29
- Label: Don Giovanni Records

California X chronology
California X (2013)	Nights in the Dark (2015)

California X is the debut full-length album by American band California X. It was released in January 2013 under Don Giovanni Records.

== Track listing ==
No.	Title	Length
1.	"Sucker"	6:43
2.	"Curse of the Nightmare"	3:04
3.	"Pond Rot"	3:37
4.	"Hot Hed"	4:13
5.	"Spider X"	4:23
6.	"Lemmy's World"	4:14
7.	"Spirit World"	3:56
8.	"Mummy"	3:18

== Reception ==
Professional ratings
Aggregate scores
Source	Rating
Metacritic	82/100
Review scores
Source	Rating
Pitchfork Media	(7.8/10)
Consequence of Sound	4.0/5 stars
Beats Per Minute	(84/100)

California X was named album of the week for January 15, 2013, by Alarm magazine.
