= Brick Mower =

brick mower
- Origin: New Brunswick, New Jersey
- Genres: Punk rock Pop punk
- Years active: 2009–present
- Labels: Don Giovanni

brick mower (typically stylized in lower capitalization) are a punk rock band formed in 2009 in New Brunswick, New Jersey. After self-releasing an album and two EPs on their own imprint Viking On Campus and touring with Black Wine, the band signed to Don Giovanni Records.

== Discography ==
=== Full length records ===
Year	Title	Label	Format
2011	Under The Sink	Viking On Campus	CD/12" vinyl LP
2012	My Hateable Face	Don Giovanni Records	CD/12" vinyl LP
2014	Teenage Graceland	Don Giovanni Records	CD/12" vinyl LP

=== EPs ===
Year	Title	Label	Format
2009	Floors	Viking On Campus	CDEP
2010	Dogs In Water	Viking On Campus	CDEP
2010	Box Turtle	Stumparumper Records	7-inch EP
2012	Why Are We Doing This?	Rok Lok Records	7-inch EP
