= Silver Haze (Aye Nako album) =

Second album by the American punk band Aye Nako

Studio album by Aye Nako
- Released: April 7, 2017
- Genre: Indie rock, punk
- Length: 37:00
- Label: Don Giovanni
- Producer: Joe Rogers

Aye Nako chronology
| The Blackest Eye (2015) | Silver Haze (2017) |

Silver Haze is the second album by the American punk band Aye Nako, released via Don Giovanni Records on April 7, 2017.

In contrast to the band's earlier work, the album's songwriting is split between singer Mars Dixon and guitarist Jade Payne.

"Particle Mace" from the album was released as a single.

== Track listing ==
All tracks are written by Aye Nako

| No. | Title | Length |
|---|---|---|
| 1. | "We're Different Now" | 1:34 |
| 2. | "Sissy" | 1:51 |
| 3. | "Half Dome" | 3:54 |
| 4. | "Nightcrawler" | 3:21 |
| 5. | "Muck" | 3:38 |
| 6. | "The Gift of Hell" | 3:57 |
| 7. | "Particle Mace" | 3:27 |
| 8. | "Arrow Island" | 3:12 |
| 9. | "Spare Me" | 2:48 |
| 10. | "Nothing Nice" | 2:29 |
| 11. | "Tourmaline" | 4:33 |
| 12. | "Maybe She's Bored with It" | 2:24 |
| Total length: | | 37:00 |

== Reception ==
Professional ratings
Review scores
| Source | Rating |
|---|---|
| Exclaim! | 8/10 |
| Pitchfork | 7.9/10 |

The album received a 7.9 score from Pitchfork, with Matthew Ismael Ruiz stating it "feels like the best of Aye Nako". Peter Ellman, reviewing for Exclaim!, gave it 8/10, commenting on how the band juxtaposed "at-times-jarring post-punk guitar parts with pretty, melodic, even catchy choruses". William Kennedy of The Portland Mercury called it "bracing and vital ’90s-era guitar rock with elements of pop punk and enough messy, open-chord Sonic Youth-style tunings".

== Personnel ==
- Mars Ganito – vocals, guitar
- Joe McCann – bass guitar
- Jade Payne – guitar
- Sheena McGrath – drums
