= Teenage Halloween =

American indie rock band

Teenage Halloween is an American indie rock band from Asbury Park, New Jersey. The group has released one EP and two full-length albums and are currently signed to Don Giovanni Records.

== History ==
Teenage Halloween began in 2014 as the solo project of Luk Henderiks, and expanded into a full band over the next few years. The group's debut EP, Eternal Roast, was released in 2017. The band released their debut self-titled album in 2020. In 2023, the group announced their second full-length album, Till You Return, set to be released on October 20. The lineup currently includes vocalist and guitarist Luk Henderiks, lead guitarist Eli Frank, drummer Peter Gargano, and bassist Tricia Marshall. Teenage Halloween have toured across the US and Canada extensively.
