= Izzy True =

American indie rock band

Izzy True is an American indie rock band signed to Don Giovanni Records. Originally the solo project of Isabel Reidy, the band now consists of Reidy, Curt Oren and Samuel Goldstein. Prior to the addition of Oren and Goldstein, the group consisted of Angela DeVivo, Jon Samuels, and Silas Reidy.

== Career ==
Reidy originally fronted the band The Realbads, prior to releasing solo music. Reidy released their debut EP in 2016 on Don Giovanni. Reidy followed up that release with their debut full-length album titled Nope. In 2018, Izzy True released their second full-length album titled Sad Bad, on Don Giovanni Records. The group released their third and latest record, Our Beautiful Baby World, on July 2, 2021.

== Discography ==
Studio albums

- Nope (2016)
- SadBad (2018, Don Giovanni)
- Our Beautiful Baby World (2021, Don Giovanni)
