= Nights in the Dark =

Nights In The Dark

Studio album by California X
- Released: January 13, 2015
- Genre: Indie rock, punk rock, emo
- Length: 36:54
- Label: Don Giovanni

California X chronology
California X (2013)	Nights In The Dark (2015)

Nights In The Dark is the second studio album by American band California X. It was released in January 2015 under Don Giovanni Records.

== Critical reception ==
Professional ratings
Aggregate scores
Source	Rating
Metacritic	69/100
Review scores
Source	Rating
AllMusic	3.5/5 stars
Consequence of Sound	B
Exclaim!	6/10
Unrecorded	70/100
Pitchfork	6.9/10 stars

Ian Gormely of Exclaim! noted an improvement in writing hooks and guitar playing, writing that the band is "comfortable in their own skin and playing at the peak of their powers, but the album would have fared best as a pared down EP nonetheless."

== Track list ==
No.	Title	Length
1.	"Nights in the Dark"	5:32
2.	"Red Planet"	3:26
3.	"Ayla's Song"	1:33
4.	"Hadley, MA"	4:10
5.	"Blackrazor, Pt. 1"	4:52
6.	"Blackrazor, Pt. 2"	6:40
7.	"Garlic Road"	2:25
8.	"Summer Road, Pt.1"	3:49
9.	"Summer Road, Pt. 2"	4:27
