= The Caulfields =

American alternative rock band

- Origin: Newark, Delaware
- Genres: Alternative rock, pop rock
- Years active: 1993–1997
- Labels: A&M Records
- Members: John Faye; Mike Simpson; Sam Musumeci; Scott Kohlmorgen; Ritchie Rubini; Brett Talley (as of 2019)

The Caulfields were an American alternative rock band from Newark, Delaware which recorded two albums for A&M Records in the late 1990s. The group was led by singer-songwriter John Faye, the frontman for the Philadelphia-based groups IKE. The group is best known for their song "Devil's Diary."

Their first album was 1995's Whirligig. The album's initial single was "Devil's Diary", which received limited radio play as well as exposure on MTV. "Devil's Diary" peaked at No. 61 in Australia. The band toured Australia on the back of airplay on popular youth radio station Triple J, supporting Australian band Died Pretty.

Two weeks before the release of their second album L in 1997, A&M Records fired the A&R executive representing the band. Six months later the Caulfields disbanded.

== Discography ==
- Whirligig (1995)
- L (1997)
- B-Sides and Rarities 1993–1997 (2005)
