= St. Lenox =

American musical group

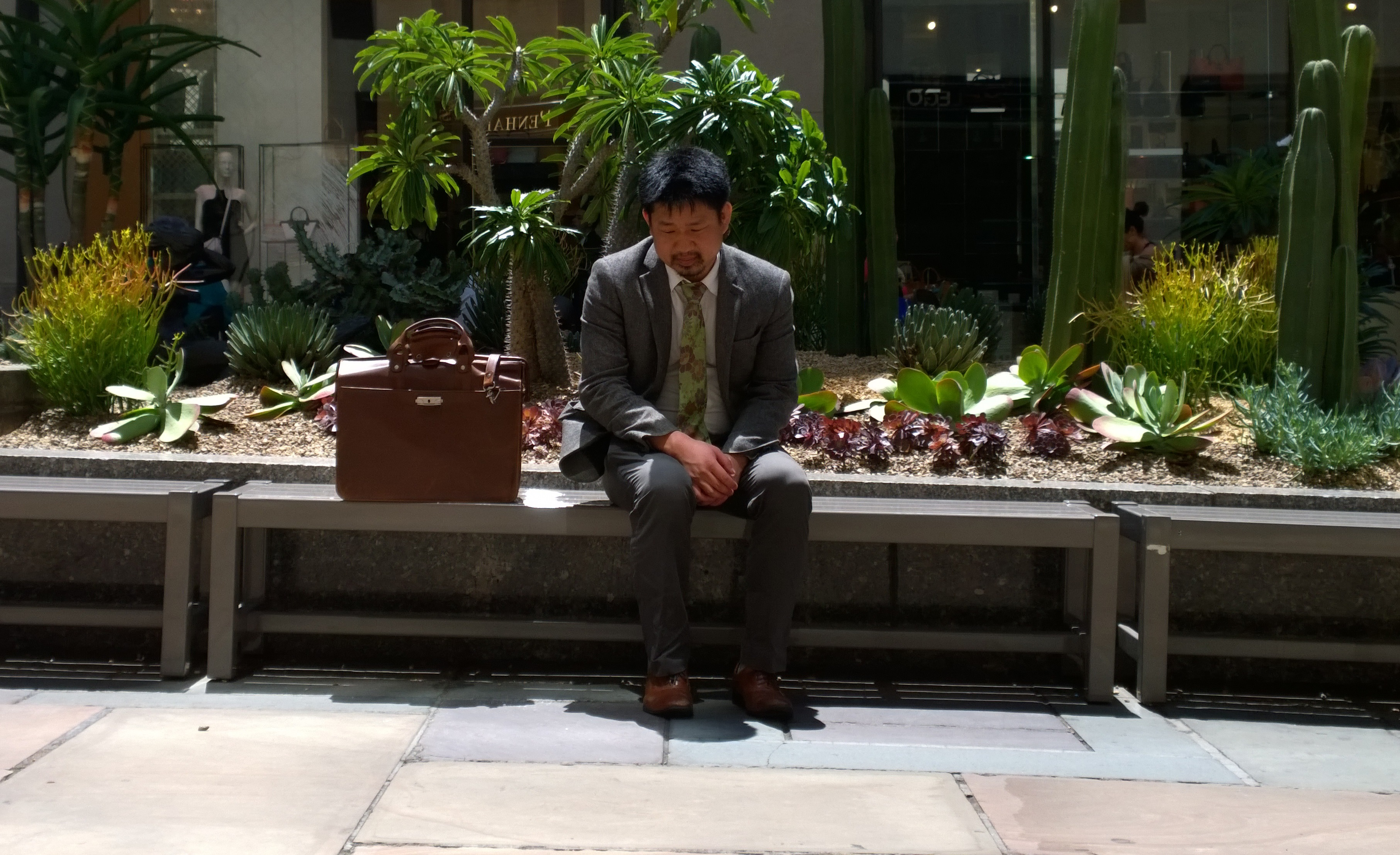
- St. Lenox at 30 Rock

Background information
- Origin: Columbus, Ohio, United States
- Genres: Indie pop, art pop, classical
- Years active: 2011–present
- Labels: Don Giovanni, Anyway
- Members: Andrew Choi

St. Lenox is an American indie pop outfit from Columbus, Ohio, United States, helmed by Andrew Choi. On stage, St. Lenox consists of Andrew Choi and a rotating list of musicians from Columbus and New York City, including Chris Hills, Nick Federinko, Jorge Vega, Brandon Vitruls and Jesse Waits. St. Lenox is currently on the Don Giovanni Records label.

AllMusic states that the project "ha[s] resulted in some of the most unique and unconventionally thrilling pop music in the late 2010s," noting Choi's use of "profoundly engaging biographical narratives" and American social commentary, observing "he has certainly carved out his own distinctive niche and owns it completely." Similarly, Popmatters refers to Choi's penchant for auto-biography and American commentary as Whitmanian, stating that St. Lenox "celebrates himself, New York City, the diverse people and occupations of Americans, and the body electric" in his work.

== Biography ==
=== Early life ===
Prior to St. Lenox, Andrew Choi was a concert violinist, who attended the pre-college program at Juilliard School, where he was a student of Won Bin Yim and Dorothy Delay. Choi was a 1st Prize winner of the American String Teacher's Association National Solo Competition for the violin. Choi was also the concertmaster of the World Youth Symphony Orchestra at the Interlochen Center for the Arts. Choi received an undergraduate degree from Princeton University, a PhD from The Ohio State University and a JD from New York University.

=== Ten Songs About Memory and Hope (2015) ===
St. Lenox's debut album, Ten Songs About Memory and Hope has received critical acclaim, with NPR noting Choi's "gigantic voice" and observing "He belts out his regrets with uncanny melisma, like John Darnielle channeling Tony Clifton." Dusted Magazine observed "confessions include Mountain Goatsesque fictions ... detailed memories with slightly sci-fi skews of the present ... But he belts them with an utter lack of guile ... You want to hang out with the guy. You want to hear him talk." College Music Journal called St. Lenox "a mournful ... act that features odd but slowly ingratiating melodies and time signatures, not to mention Choi’s tear-stained, journal-like lyrics that spill out and around the songs. Live, it can be arrestingly intense or just curious, depending on your ability to let love in, as Nick Cave might say. And actually, there’s a darkness to St. Lenox that probably means he has a few Cave CDs on his shelves." Comparisons with the Mountain Goats include statements from John Darnielle, who called Choi a "lyricist of the highest order," remarking that he was "feeling really evangelical about just how good a lyricist Andy choi is." Alternatively, Josh Terzino of Music. Defined notes that St. Lenox has "a storytelling style reminiscent of a young Billy Joel."

In 2015, Ten Songs About Memory and Hope was placed on a number of local and regional End-of-Year lists. Of note, the Editor-in-Chief of Noisey (VICE's music division) named the song "Bitter Pill" one of the ten best songs of the year, noting "this might be one of the saddest songs I’ve ever heard."

=== Ten Hymns from My American Gothic (2016-2017) ===
In October 2016, St. Lenox released his sophomore album, "Ten Hymns From My American Gothic," written as a gift to his father, who immigrated from South Korea, in honor of his 70th birthday. Commenting on the album in Angry Asian Man, Choi noted that the album focused on first and second-generation American narratives, and was written as a form of modern American social realism. Given the timing of the release, some writers interpreted the album as a commentary on the 2016 Presidential Election.

The album was critically well-received, with PopMatters calling the record "nothing short of a 21st century pop masterpiece," and praising St. Lenox as a "singular voice" in a period marked by "the ever increasing white noise overwhelming the internet in the wake of the great democratization of recording." The review, noting the immigration themes throughout, compared the song "People From Other Cultures" to the "Parents" episode of Master of None. AllMusic similarly praised the album as an example of "true 21st century songwriting" observing that St. Lenox’s "gutsy indie pop chronicles the modern American experience in a dazzling litany of soulful free verse." The Harvard Crimson, comparing Choi’s voice to Chris Stapleton and Van Morrison proclaimed it a "stellar album, covering the experience of the children of immigrants from the emotional highs of boundless optimism to cultural disconnect … one of the most interesting releases of the year." Premiering the video for the song "Thurgood Marshall", Stereogum described Choi’s voice as "one of the most striking instruments in music today." The song "Thurgood Marshall" was additionally featured as a Best Songs of the Week at Consequence of Sound and Vulture, and referenced as part of the popular culture history of the late Supreme Court justice in Time Magazine.

"Ten Hymns" appeared on a number of national and regional End-Of-Year lists, in particular making the Best Albums of 2016 list at PopMatters, as well as being one of the highest rated albums of 2016 on Metacritic, receiving a Metascore of 85. The record was also the highest rated indie pop record from PopMatters for the year 2016, as well as the highest rated indie pop record of 2016 according to album review aggregator Album Of The Year.

=== Ten Fables of Young Ambition and Passionate Love (2018) ===
In May 2018, St. Lenox debuted material from his third album, "Ten Fables of Young Ambition and Passionate Love" on podcast Improv4Humans, performing a live version of the opening track, "Hashtag Brooklyn Karaoke Party" with comedians Paul F. Tompkins, Janet Varney, Seth Morris and Matt Besser.

St. Lenox subsequently released the album in September 2018. Stereogum premiered the record, hailing St. Lenox as "a truly unique and captivating American songwriter," and exclaiming that "no one sings like Andrew Choi." PopMatters praised the record's literary qualities, describing St. Lenox as "a lyrical genius" with comparisons to Walt Whitman, noting "Choi's a Whitmanian who ... celebrates himself, New York City, the diverse people and occupations of Americans, and the body electric ... full of wry observations about the people and places he encounters and his search for love that capture the old courage teacher's modern sensibility." AllMusic similarly highlighted the record's distinctly American observational commentary, noting that St. Lenox "manages to remain relatable and grounded, spinning with great fervor tales that while unique to his path could also belong to thousands of other Americans trying to navigate their way across the confusing social landscapes of their own cities and communities ... Choi's extravagant presentation and lingering Midwestern humility somehow cancel each other out and into the creative enigma that is St. Lenox."

As with "Ten Hymns", "Ten Fables" appeared on a number of national and regional End-Of-Year lists, in particular being ranked #43 on PopMatters Best Albums of 2018 List, as well making the AllMusic list of Best Indie Pop and Indie Rock Albums of 2018.

== Influences ==
St. Lenox's voice has drawn a variety of comparisons, with Cincinnati CityBeat pointing to similarities with Cee-Lo Green, Ryan Adams and Adam Levine. El Correo compares St. Lenox's voice to that of Cee-Lo Green and Stevie Wonder. Willfully Obscure notes "I'd more accurately slot his soaring, penetratingly melodic timbre somewhere between Stevie Wonder and Adam Levine. But upon deeper investigation ... something all the more indigenous and captivating, a la Jeff Buckley or Rufus Wainwright." Notably, Stereogum has referenced St. Lenox's voice in an increasingly wide variety of contexts, comparing his voice to that of John Darnielle, Michael Stipe, Jamie Stewart, Craig Finn, Cee-Lo Green and Wesley Willis.

== Other Appearances ==
St. Lenox appeared on a limited-run streaming series, organized by staff at MTV called "Streamed Dumplings". He also made a brief musical appearance on the TLC show Extreme Cheapskates, serenading a couple on their first date.

== Discography ==
=== LPs ===
- Ten Modern American Work Songs (2024)
- Ten Songs of Worship and Praise for our Tumultuous Times (2021)
- Ten Fables of Young Ambition and Passionate Love (2018)
- Ten Hymns from My American Gothic (2016)
- Ten Songs About Memory and Hope (2015)

=== EPs ===
- Five Songs in the Style of Fritz Kreisler (2014)
- That Old Time Religion Maxi-Single (2013)
