= Whirligig (album) =

Studio album by The Caulfields
- Released: February 7, 1995
- Recorded: July–September 1994
- Studio: The Plant, Sausalito, California
- Genre: Alternative rock; pop rock
- Label: A&M
- Producer: Kevin Moloney, The Caulfields

The Caulfields chronology
Whirligig (1995)	L (1997)

Whirligig is the first studio album by the alternative rock band The Caulfields. It was released on audio cassette and CD on February 7, 1995, on A&M Records.

== Critical reception ==
Professional ratings
Review scores
Source	Rating
AllMusic	4.5/5 stars
Tucson Weekly	2/4 stars

People called the album an "exceptionally smart collection of pop-rock gems with a sound that recalls the glory days of Elvis Costello & the Attractions." Trouser Press wrote: "Singer/guitarist John Faye chronicles slacker life in a sleepy college town, addressing alienation and the perceived hypocrisy of the adult world in short, catchy modern pop songs that occasionally betray his grave concerns about important matters."

== Track listing ==
All tracks composed by John Faye; except where noted.

1. "Devil's Diary" – 3:36
2. "Awake on Wednesday" - 4:32
3. "Rickshaw" – 2:45
4. "Alex Again" (John Faye, Mike Simpson) – 3:24
5. "The Day That Came and Went" – 4:12
6. "Fragile" – 4:09
7. "All of My Young Life" – 4:38
8. "Where Are They Now?" – 2:45
9. "Hannah, I Locked You Out" – 3:12
10. "Breathe Under Water" – 3:17
11. "The Underwater World of Asia X" – 3:59
12. "Disease" – 2:38

== Personnel ==
The Caulfields

- John Faye - vocals, guitar
- Mike Simpson - lead guitar, backing vocals
- Sam Musumeci - bass guitar, backing vocals; acoustic guitar on "Fragile"
- Scott Kohlmorgen - drums

with:

- Bruce Kaphan - Mellotron on "Devil's Diary"; pedal steel guitar and organ on "Fragile"
