= Sug Daniels =

American singer-songwriter

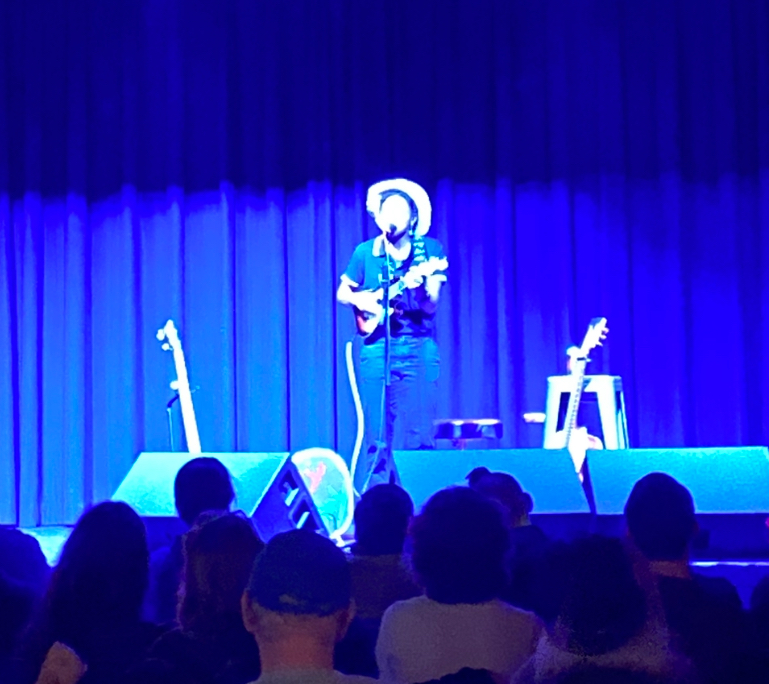
- Daniels performing at Motorco Music Hall in Durham, North Carolina in 2024

Background information
- Born: Danielle Johnson; Smyrna, Delaware, U.S.
- Origin: Philadelphia, Pennsylvania, U.S.
- Genres: Contemporary R&B; Contemporary folk
- Occupation: singer-songwriter
- Instruments: vocals guitar ukulele
- Label: Don Giovanni Records
- Website: sugdaniels.com

Danielle Johnson, known professionally as Sug Daniels, is an American singer-songwriter and musician.

== Early life ==
Johnson was born in Delaware and grew up in Smyrna. She was raised in the Southern Baptist faith but left after coming out as queer.

== Career ==
Johnson is a singer-songwriter and combines elements of folk music and rhythm and blues in her work. She previously was a rapper and singer in the musical projects Hoochi Coochi and FlowCity before embarking on a career as a solo artist.

In 2022, she released the single "Lightning In A Bottle" with John Faye. In 2023, she released the single "When I'm Gone" with Don Giovanni Records. Daniels toured and opened for The Black Opry Revue, Sarah Shook & The Disarmers, Molly Tuttle, Adeem the Artist, and William Elliott Whitmore.

Her debut studio album is scheduled to be released in 2025.

== Personal life ==
She lives in Philadelphia with her partner Andrea and another Philadelphia singer songwriter Donnie Coco.
