= L (The Caulfields album) =

Studio album by The Caulfields
- Released: April 22, 1997
- Genre: Alternative rock; pop rock
- Length: 55:04
- Label: A&M
- Producer: David Bianco, The Caulfields

The Caulfields chronology
Whiligig (1995)	L (1997)

L is the second and last album released by alternative rock group the Caulfields. The album was released on compact disc on April 22, 1997, by A&M Records.

== Track listing ==
1. "Figure It Out" – 3:47
2. "President of Nothing" – 3:59
3. "Waiting to Cry" – 2:52
4. "Once Upon a Time" – 4:40
5. "Invincible" – 3:22
6. "Book of Your Life" – 3:17
7. "The Kitchen Debate" – 3:13
8. "Skeleton Key" – 3:46
9. "All I Want Is Out" – 3:29
10. "All Things to All People" – 3:01
11. "Atlas Daughter" – 3:34
12. "Heaven on the Moon" – 4:14
13. "Beard of Bees" – 2:52
14. "Tomorrow Morning" – 3:54
15. "Born Yesterday" – 3:59
