= Holy Hell (Noun album) =

Studio album by Noun
- Released: July 6, 2010
- Recorded: Hunt Studio
- Length: 26:32
- Label: Don Giovanni Records

Noun chronology
Holy Hell (2010)	Noun (EP) (2012)

Professional ratings
Review scores
Source	Rating
Reviler Magazine	(82/100)
Spin	3.5/5 stars

Holy Hell is the debut album from Noun, the solo project of Marissa Paternoster of Screaming Females. The album was released by Don Giovanni Records in 2010.

== Track listing ==
1. Black Lamb
2. Outer Space
3. Holy Hell
4. Wrong Things
5. Pearly Gates
6. Call Earth
7. Old Friends
8. So Rough
9. Brother
10. Talk
