= Reasons to Live (album) =

Studio album by Hilly Eye
- Released: January 22, 2013
- Genres: Indie rock, punk rock
- Length: 42:22
- Label: Don Giovanni Records

Professional ratings
Review scores
| Source | Rating |
|---|---|
| Pitchfork Media | (6.1/10) |
| Paste | (6.8/10) |
| Impose | Favorable |

Reasons to Live is the debut full-length album by Hilly Eye and was released by Don Giovanni Records.

== Track listing ==
1. Way Back When
2. Jersey City
3. American Rail
4. Amnesia
5. Double Dutch
6. Animal
7. Louisville
8. January
9. Almanac
10. Jacob's Ladder
