= Nude Beach (band) =

American punk rock band

- Origin: Brooklyn, New York, USA
- Genres: Punk rock
- Years active: 2008–
- Labels: Don Giovanni Records; Mandible Records; Other Music Recording Co.
- Members: Chuck Betz; Jim Shelton; Ryan Naideau

Nude Beach are an American punk rock band formed in 2008. The band has released albums on Mandible Records, Other Music Recording Co., and Don Giovanni Records.

== Discography ==
=== Full Length Records ===
Year	Title	Label	Format
2010	Nude Beach	Mandible Records	LP
2012	II	Nude Beach Records / Other Music Recording Co.	CD/LP
2014	77	Don Giovanni Records	CD/2xLP

=== EPs ===
Year	Title	Label	Format
2013	What Can Ya Do?	Other Music Recording Co.	7" vinyl
