= Winterhawk (band) =

American heavy metal band

- Origin: San Francisco California, U.S.
- Genres: Heavy Metal; Hard rock
- Years active: 1978–1985
- Labels: Mother Earth; Don Giovanni
- Past members: Nik Alexander; Alfonso Kolb; Frank J. Diaz de Leon; Frankie Joe; Doug Love; Gordon Campbell; Jon Gibson

Winterhawk was an American heavy metal band formed in 1978 in San Francisco, California. Fronted by lead vocalist, lead guitarist and songwriter Nik "Winterhawk" Alexander (a Cree musician), the band released two albums via Mother Earth records. Their debut album, Electric Warriors (1979), was produced by Tom Bee.

Their second album, Dog Soldier (1980), included drums and backing vocals by Jon Gibson. In 2021, both Electric Warriors and Dog Soldier were remastered and reissued via Don Giovanni Records.

Winterhawk was committed to a native anti-drug movement, pioneering an abstinence-through-music platform that ran parallel to the straight edge hardcore movement. Winterhawk performed in the 1983 US Festival and has opened for Tina Turner, Santana, Country Joe and the Fish, Steve Miller and Van Halen.

The band separated in 1984. Due to cancer, Alexander died on July 5, 2017.

== Discography ==
=== Albums ===
Year	Title	Label	Format
1979	Electric Warriors	Mother Earth Records, Don Giovanni Records	CD/LP/cassette/digital
1980	Dog Soldier	Mother Earth Records, Don Giovanni Records	CD/LP/cassette/digital

=== EPs ===
Year	Title	Label	Format
1984	Good Golly Miss Molly / Rock And Roll Soldier	Starman Records	45 RPM Single

== Personnel ==
- Nik Alexander — lead vocals, lead guitar
- Doug Love — bass, backing vocals, percussion
- Alfonso Kolb — drummer
- Frank J. Diaz de Leon — bass guitar
- Frankie Joe — rhythm guitar
- Gordon Campbell — trombone, bells
- Jon Gibson — drums, backing vocals
