= Bat Fangs =

American rock duo

- Origin: Washington, D.C., and Carrboro, North Carolina, U.S.
- Genres: Glam rock; power pop; garage rock
- Years active: 2016–present
- Label: Don Giovanni
- Members: Betsy Wright; Laura King

Bat Fangs is an American rock duo formed in 2016 by guitarist and vocalist Betsy Wright and drummer Laura King. Based in Washington, D.C., and Carrboro, North Carolina, they play a guitar-driven style drawing on glam rock and power pop. Their self-titled debut album was released in 2018, followed by Queen of My World in 2021, both on Don Giovanni Records.

== History ==
=== Formation and debut album (2015–2018) ===
After touring with Ex Hex for their 2014 album Rips, Wright began writing songs influenced by arena rock and 1980s pop metal that did not fit Ex Hex's sound. She contacted North Carolina drummer Laura King, whom she had met through touring; King had played in Flesh Wounds and in Mac McCaughan's backing band the Non-Believers.

Wright sent King demos and traveled to North Carolina in late 2015 to rehearse and record a two-song demo with engineer Charles Chase. The pair continued writing and recording over the following months, drawing on their shared interest in hair metal, classic rock, and 1980s pop. They recorded their self-titled debut album in January 2017 with Mike Montgomery of the band R. Ring at his studio in Kentucky.

Bat Fangs was released on February 2, 2018. Recorded largely live to tape with minimal overdubs, the album features nine songs in under half an hour. Critics described the record as blending glam rock, metal, and power pop with elements of garage rock and occult-themed imagery.

=== Queen of My World (2019–present) ===
Bat Fangs' second album, Queen of My World, was released in 2021 by Don Giovanni Records.

The album received positive reviews, with Pitchfork awarding it a score of 7.5 out of 10 and noting its use of hair-metal and late-1980s rock motifs while avoiding the genre's excesses.

== Band members ==
- Betsy Wright – guitar, vocals (2016–present)
- Laura King – drums (2016–present)

== Discography ==
=== Studio albums ===
- Bat Fangs (2018, Don Giovanni)
- Queen of My World (2021, Don Giovanni)
