= Hilly Eye =

American band

- Origin: Brooklyn, New York, U.S.
- Genres: Punk rock Riot Grrrl
- Years active: 2009–?
- Labels: Don Giovanni
- Members: Amy Klein; Catherine Tung

Hilly Eye are an American two-piece band formed in 2009. The band is fronted by Amy Klein, a former guitarist and violinist of the band Titus Andronicus. They signed to Don Giovanni Records in 2012.

== Discography ==
=== Albums ===
Year	Title	Label	Format
2013	Reasons to Live	Don Giovanni Records	12" vinyl LP, CD, Digital

=== EPs ===
Year	Title	Label	Format
2012	Jacob's Ladder	Don Giovanni Records	7" vinyl
