= Pinkwash (band) =

- Origin: Philadelphia, Pennsylvania, United States
- Genres: Punk rock Pop punk
- Years active: 2014–present
- Label: Don Giovanni
- Members: Joey Doubek; Ashley Arnwine

Pinkwash is an American punk rock band formed in 2014 in Philadelphia, Pennsylvania, United States. After releasing 2 EPs on Sister Polygon Records they released their debut album on Don Giovanni Records in 2016.

== Discography ==
=== Albums ===
Year	Title	Label	Format
2016	Collective Sigh	Don Giovanni Records	CD/12" vinyl LP

=== EPs ===
Year	Title	Label	Format
2014	Your Cure Your Soil	Sister Polygon Records	Cassette
2015	Cancer Money	Sister Polygon Records	7" Single

== Associated Acts ==
Pinkwash was formed by previous members of iconic Washington, DC bands Ingrid and Mass Movement of the Moth.
