= Supercrush =

Rock band

- Origin: Vancouver, Canada
- Genres: Power pop; indie pop
- Years active: 2013–present
- Labels: Grave Mistake; Debt Offensive; Don Giovanni
- Members: Mark Palm; Aaron O'Neil; Allen Trainer; Phil Jones

Supercrush are a power pop band formed in 2013. The band is fronted by Mark Palm, a former singer of the hardcore band Go It Alone. They signed to Don Giovanni Records in 2020.

== Discography ==
=== Albums ===
| Year | Title | Label | Format |
|---|---|---|---|
| 2019 | Never Let You Drift Away | Debt Offensive | 12" vinyl LP, CD, Cassette, Digital |
| 2020 | SODO Pop | Don Giovanni Records | 12" vinyl LP, CD, Cassette, Digital |

=== EPs ===
| Year | Title | Label | Format |
|---|---|---|---|
| 2013 | Lifted / Melt Into You (Drift Away) | Grave Mistake | 7" vinyl |
| 2015 | I Don't Want To Be Sad Anymore b/w How Does It Feel (To Feel Like You)? | Debt Offensive | 7" vinyl |
| 2018 | I Can't Lie b/w Walking Backwards | Debt Offensive | 7" vinyl |
| 2018 | I've Been Around b/w Brutal Honesty | Debt Offensive | 7" vinyl |
| 2019 | Parallel Lines / I Just Wanted To See You So Bad | KR Records | single sided flexi vinyl |
| 2021 | I Didn’t Know (We Were Saying Goodbye) / I Wanna Be Happy | KR Records | single sided flexi vinyl |
| 2021 | Be Kind To Me / Couldn't Care Less | KR Records | single sided flexi vinyl |
| 2022 | Melody Maker | KR Records | 12" vinyl, CD, cassette, digital |
| 2022 | Trophy / Gold Star For Robot Boy | KR Records | single sided flexi vinyl |
| 2023 | Perfect Smile / Take The Path | KR Records | single sided flexi vinyl |
