= Weakened Friends =

American indie rock band

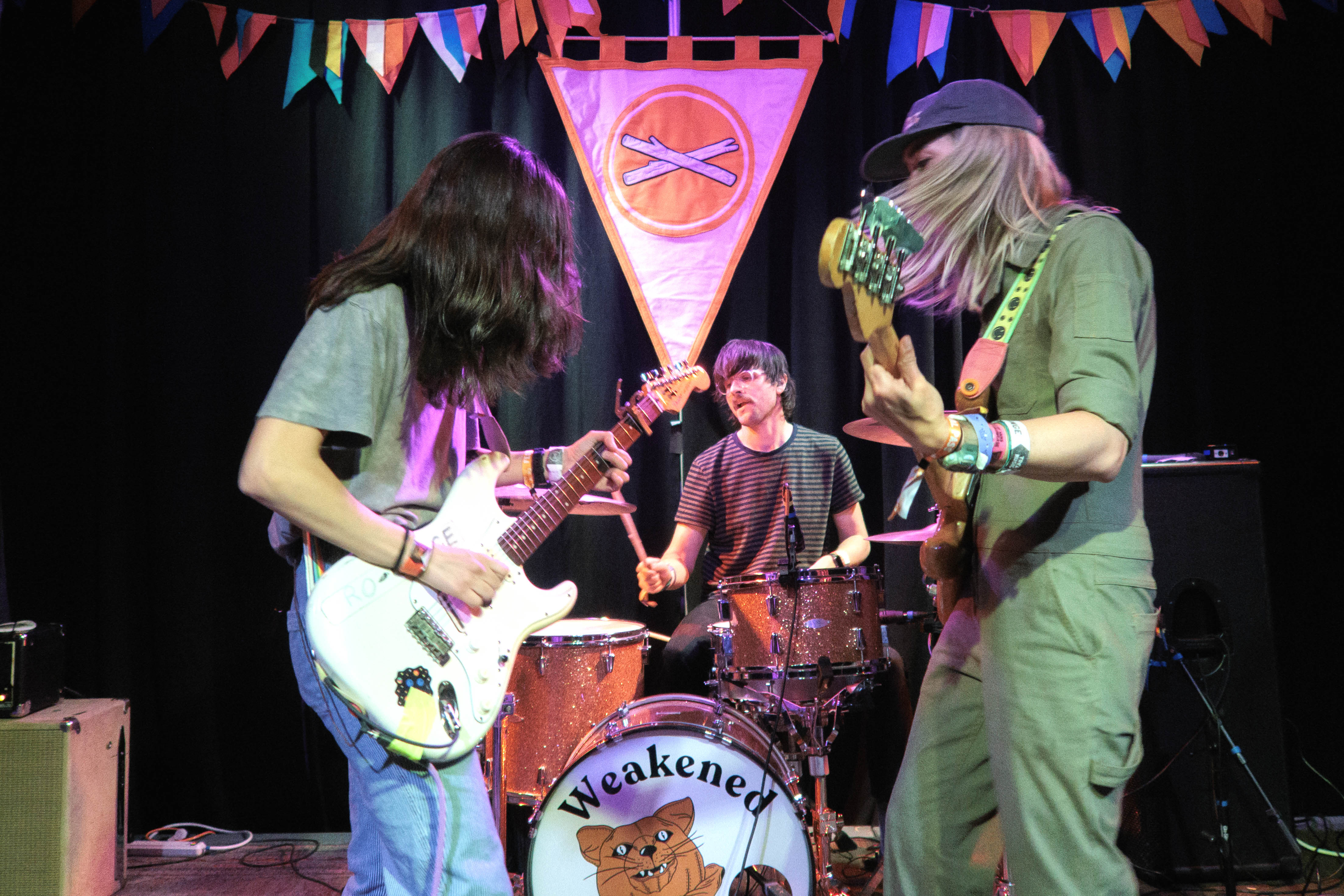
- Weakened Friends in 2022

Background information
- Origin: Portland, Maine, United States
- Genres: Indie rock
- Years active: 2015–present
- Label: Don Giovanni
- Members: Sonia Sturino; Annie Hoffman; Adam Hand
- Past members: Cam Jones

Weakened Friends is an American indie rock band formed in Portland, Maine best known for their 2018 song "Blue Again", from their debut full-length album Common Blah. The band consists of married couple Sonia Sturino (vocals, guitar) and Annie Hoffman (bass, vocals), and Adam Hand (drums).

In 2021, the band announced their second full-length album, Quitter, released on November 19.

== Members ==
Current members

- Sonia Sturino - guitars, vocals (2015–present)
- Annie Hoffman - bass, vocals (2015–present)
- Adam Hand - drums (2019–present)

Past members

- Cam Jones - drums (2015-2019)

== Discography ==
Studio Albums

- Common Blah (2018, Don Giovanni)
- Quitter (2021, Don Giovanni)
- Feels Like Hell (2025, Don Giovanni)

Extended Plays

- Gloomy Tunes (2015, self-released)
- Crushed (2016, Counter Intuitive Records)
- Singles
- "What You Like" (2019, Don Giovanni)
