= California X =

Punk rock band

- Origin: Amherst, Massachusetts, USA
- Genres: Indie rock, punk rock, hard rock, emo, pop punk
- Years active: 2012–present
- Labels: Don Giovanni
- Members: Lemmy Gurtowsky; Dan Jones; Cole Lanier; Zacky Brower

California X are a punk rock band formed in 2012 in Amherst, Massachusetts by Lemuel Gurtowsky. They released their debut album in 2013 on Don Giovanni Records. Their second album, Nights In The Dark, was released in 2015, once again via Don Giovanni Records.

== Discography ==
=== LPs ===
Year	Title	Label	Format
2013	California X	Don Giovanni Records	12" vinyl LP / CD
2015	Nights in the Dark	Don Giovanni Records	12" vinyl LP / CD

=== EPs ===
Year	Title	Label	Format
2012	Sucker / Mummy	The Sounds Of Sweet Nothing	7" single
