= Shellshag =

- Origin: Brooklyn, New York, United States
- Genres: Punk rock Pop punk
- Years active: 1997–present
- Labels: Don Giovanni; Starcleaner Records; Mauled by Tigers; We Are Busy Bodies; Thrillhouse Records; Plan it X South
- Members: Jennifer Shagawat; John "Shellhead" Driver

Shellshag is an American two piece punk rock band, formed in 1997, that have released records on Don Giovanni Records, Mauled by Tigers, We Are Busy Bodies, Thrillhouse Records, Plan it X South, Dead Broke Records and their own imprint Starcleaner Records. Their first EP was recorded by Gary Young. Although they never kept careful track, it is estimated that the duo has played upwards of 1,980 shows since their humble beginnings in San Francisco's Mission District. This was achieved by near constant touring, including a year long tour. Shellshag has shared stages across the world with famous acts such as Iggy Pop, The Cramps, The Slits, Laura Stevenson, Ted Leo, Dos, Mike Watt + The Missing Men, The Dicks, AJJ, Kimya Dawson, Screaming Females, Japanther, and The Marked Men to name a few.

== Pop-culture and media ==
Shellshag's song "Face to Face" from their 2013 album Shellshag Forever is used as the theme song to Chris Gethard's podcast Beautiful Stories From Anonymous People, also known as Beautiful/Anonymous.

Shellshag was the executive producer for the film Here To Be Heard: The Story of The Slits. Jen Shagawat also provided footage for the documentary, which she filmed while road managing a 2008 cross-country USA tour for The Slits. Shellshag toured with the reformed Slits in 2009 as well.

In early 2019, the band released a unique movie/"Visual Album" called 18 Sycamore as an accompaniment to their Double LP of the same name. The movie, filmed and edited by the band, chronicles nearly 25 years of friendship and shows. 18 Sycamore does not run with the pack in terms of past Shellshag albums: it is a stripped down, acoustic version of their sound, with one half of the double LP being Shell solo, while the other half is Shag solo. Furthermore, it is not available on any streaming or music downloading platforms other than purchase via their Starcleaner website. As their bandcamp page states, "The revolution will not be spotifyed."

== Personal history ==
The pair met in San Francisco, California in 1996 at Jennifer Shagawat's DIY venue known as Starcleaners Warehouse. The Brian Jonestown Massacre played there regularly and The Dandy Warhols were signed there. Shortly thereafter, guitarist John "Shellhead" Driver, percussionist Jennifer Shagawat, and bassist Danny Lovefinger created the band Kung Fu USA. The duo, who would later come to be known simply as "Shell" and "Shag," also played in a group with Matty Luv Hickey and Matt Powell a.k.a. The Boy called, Me, You and the Boyz. In addition, associated band 50 Million, composed of Wade Driver and Shellhead Driver, played a set with The Naked Cult of Hickey in 1996 infamously known as the Christmas recordings. This formed the temporary group known as Hickey-Million.

== Discography ==
=== Albums ===
Year	Title	Label	Format
2007	Destroy Me I'm Yours	Starcleaner Records	12" vinyl LP
2010	Rumors In Disguise	Don Giovanni Records	12" vinyl LP, CD
2012	Fuck Society Volume 1	Mauled by Tigers	12" vinyl LP
2013	Shellshag Forever	Don Giovanni Records	12" vinyl LP
2015	Why'd I have to get so high?	Starcleaner Records	12" vinyl LP
2019	18 Sycamore	Starcleaner Records	12" vinyl double LP
2020	Follow up the Quest	Starcleaner Records	12" vinyl LP

=== EPs ===
Year	Title	Label	Format
2004	Gary Young EP	Starcleaner Records	CD EP
2004	Mission Limo Blues EP	Starcleaner Records	7" vinyl EP
2009	Shellshag Pipe Bomb Split	Planit X South Starcleaner Records	7" vinyl EP
2012	Star and Bars	We Are Busy Bodies	7" vinyl EP
2012	Lifestyle Obsession Split with Apogee Sound Club	Thrillhouse Records	7" vinyl EP
2019	Fleshies/Shellshag 7" split	Dead Broke Records	7" vinyl EP
