= Reason to Live (album) =

Studio album by Lou Barlow
- Released: May 28, 2021
- Length: 44:10
- Label: Joyful Noise

Lou Barlow chronology
Brace the Wave (2015)	Reason to Live (2021)

Professional ratings
Aggregate scores
Source	Rating
AnyDecentMusic?	7.3/10
Metacritic	78/100
Review scores
Source	Rating
AllMusic	3.5/5 stars
Clash	8/10
MusicOMH	3.5/5 stars
The Observer	4/5 stars
Uncut	7/10
Under the Radar	8/10 stars

Reason to Live is the fourth solo studio album by American musician Lou Barlow. It was released on May 28, 2021, through Joyful Noise Recordings.

== Track listing ==
Reason to Live track listing
No.	Title	Length
1.	"In My Arms"	2:35
2.	"Reason to Live"	3:16
3.	"Why Can't It Wait"	2:53
4.	"Love Intervene"	3:21
5.	"Privatize"	2:53
6.	"I Don't Like Changes"	3:39
7.	"Clouded Age"	3:26
8.	"Over You"	1:34
9.	"How Do I Know"	1:28
10.	"Cold One"	2:25
11.	"Thirsty"	1:49
12.	"Maumee"	1:50
13.	"Lows and Highs"	2:36
14.	"Paws"	2:16
15.	"Tempted"	2:00
16.	"All You People Suck"	2:59
17.	"Act of Faith"	3:00
Total length:		44:10
