= Paisley Fields =

Alt country artist, active from 2013

- Born: Hudson, Iowa, U.S.
- Origin: Brooklyn, New York, U.S.
- Genres: Alt country; americana
- Years active: 2013 – present
- Label: Don Giovanni Records
- Member of: Lavender Country
- Members: James Wilson
- Website: thepaisleyfields.com

James Wilson, known professionally as Paisley Fields, is a queer country music artist based between Brooklyn, NY and Nashville, TN.

== Background ==
Wilson grew up in Hudson, Iowa where their grandparents owned a farm. They grew up listening to country music, but resisted performing in the genre until they reconnected with their country roots while living in Japan.

Wilson is queer and non-binary.

== Career ==
Wilson assembled an alt-country band which performed their first show as the Paisley Fields in Brooklyn on New Year's Eve 2013. After the release of their first EP Oh These Urban Fences in 2015, Wilson adopted the name Paisley Fields as a stage name. Their first full-length album Glitter & Sawdust, released in 2018, is an exploration of the duality of the masculine and feminine.

The next two albums Electric Park Ballroom and Limp Wrist were released on Don Giovanni Records. Electric Park Ballroom is named after a dancehall they visited in childhood but the songs center on present-day urban narratives while Limp Wrist focuses on the realities of rural queer life.

In 2019, Paisley Fields toured with queer country pioneers Lavender Country and Lavender Country later guested on Paisley Fields' "Stay Away From My Man." They played keyboards on Lavender Country's 2022 album Blackberry Rose.

"Burn This Statehouse Down," a duet with Mya Byrne protesting Tennessee's anti-trans legislation, was chosen as one of NPR music critic Ann Powers' favorite songs of 2023.

As a songwriter, Wilson has written with Bob the Drag Queen ("Purse First") and Scarlet Envy ("Feeling Is Mutual," "Press On," "Is It Me?").

== Style ==
Paisley Fields combines country, rock, pop, and disco while their lyrics include explicit queer themes, ranging from gay sex ("Ride Me Cowboy") to being outed ("Blackhawk County Line") to referencing Matthew Shepard ("Iowa").

== Discography ==
- "Burn This Statehouse Down" with Mya Byrne (2023) (Kill Rock Stars)
- The Field Sessions Live EP (2023) (Don Giovanni Records)
- Limp Wrist (2022) (Don Giovanni Records)
- Electric Park Ballroom (2020) (Don Giovanni Records)
- Glitter & Sawdust (2018)
- Oh These Urban Fences EP (2015)
