= The Measure (SA) =

American punk rock band

- Origin: New Brunswick, New Jersey, U.S.
- Genres: Punk rock Pop punk
- Years active: 2005–2011
- Labels: Don Giovanni

The Measure (SA) was an American punk rock band formed in 2005 in New Brunswick, New Jersey, that released albums on Don Giovanni Records and No Idea Records. The (SA) in the name is for "Strictly Analog". They played their last shows in 2011 in New Brunswick and at The Fest 10 in Gainesville, Florida.
