= Noun (band) =

Solo musical project

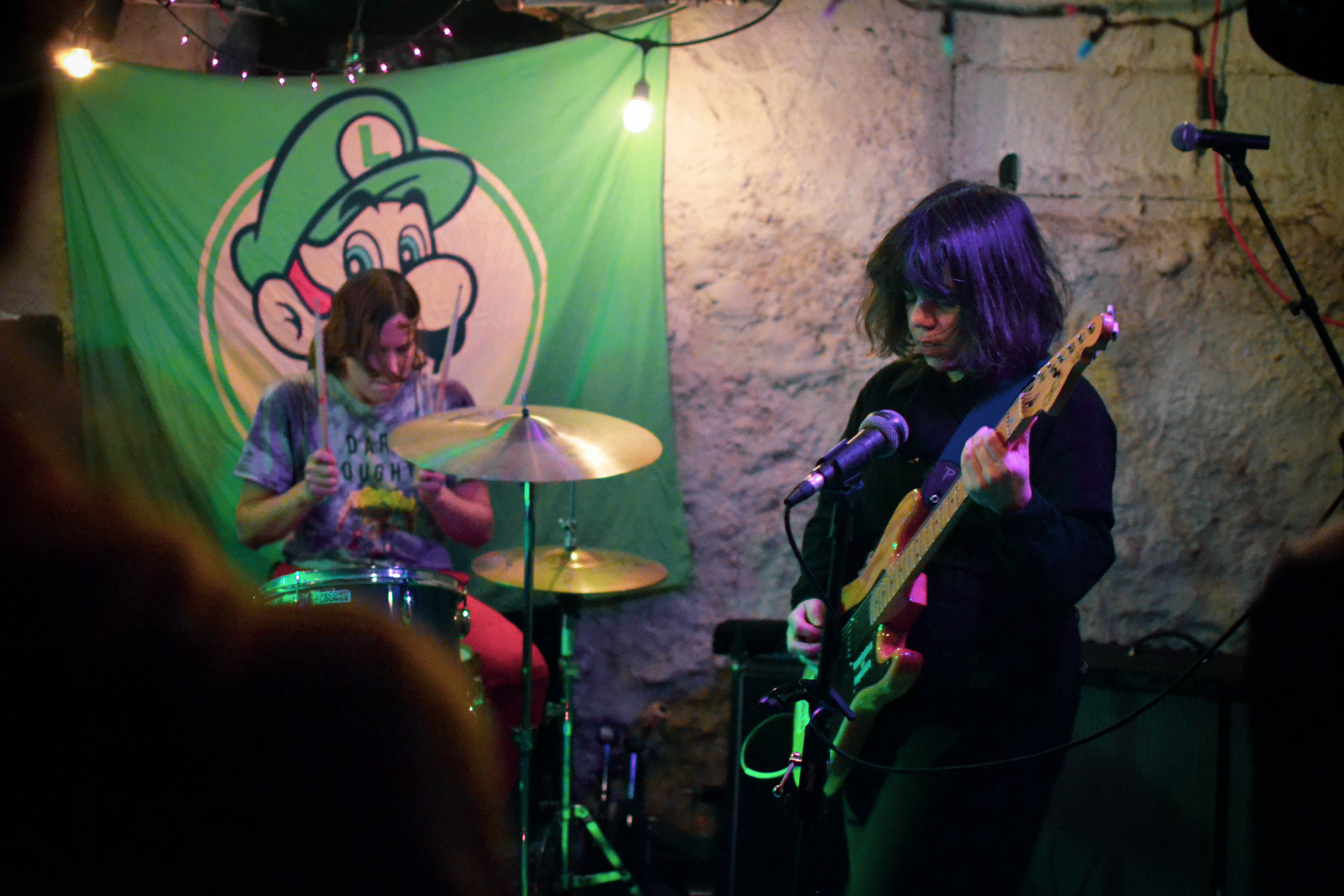
- Noun performing in Philadelphia, Pennsylvania, 20 November 2025

Background information
- Origin: New Brunswick, New Jersey, USA
- Genres: Punk rock, indie rock
- Years active: 2004–present
- Label: Don Giovanni
- Members: Marissa Paternoster

Noun is the solo musical project of Screaming Females lead guitar player Marissa Paternoster. Paternoster started recording as Noun in 2004 and had a track featured on the I Heard This First CD compilation, her first release was a 2009 self-released cassette called Forgotten Grin compiling 5 years' worth of material, reissued on Don Giovanni Records in 2013. Noun's first full-length, Holy Hell was released in 2010 by Don Giovanni Records.

In a 2012 list Paternoster was named the 77th-greatest guitarist of all time by SPIN magazine.

== Discography ==
=== Full-length records ===
Year	Title	Label	Format
2008	Forgotten Grin	Self Released / Don Giovanni Records	Cassette Tape
2010	Holy Hell	Don Giovanni Records	CD, 12" vinyl LP
2015	Throw Your Body On The Gears And Stop The Machine With Your Blood	Don Giovanni Records	12" vinyl LP
2018	Slug	State Champion Records	CD, Cassette Tape
2021	Peace Meter	Don Giovanni Records	CD, 12" vinyl LP

=== EPs ===
Year	Title	Label	Format
2012	Noun	Don Giovanni Records	7" vinyl
