= The Homeless Gospel Choir =

American folk-punk musician

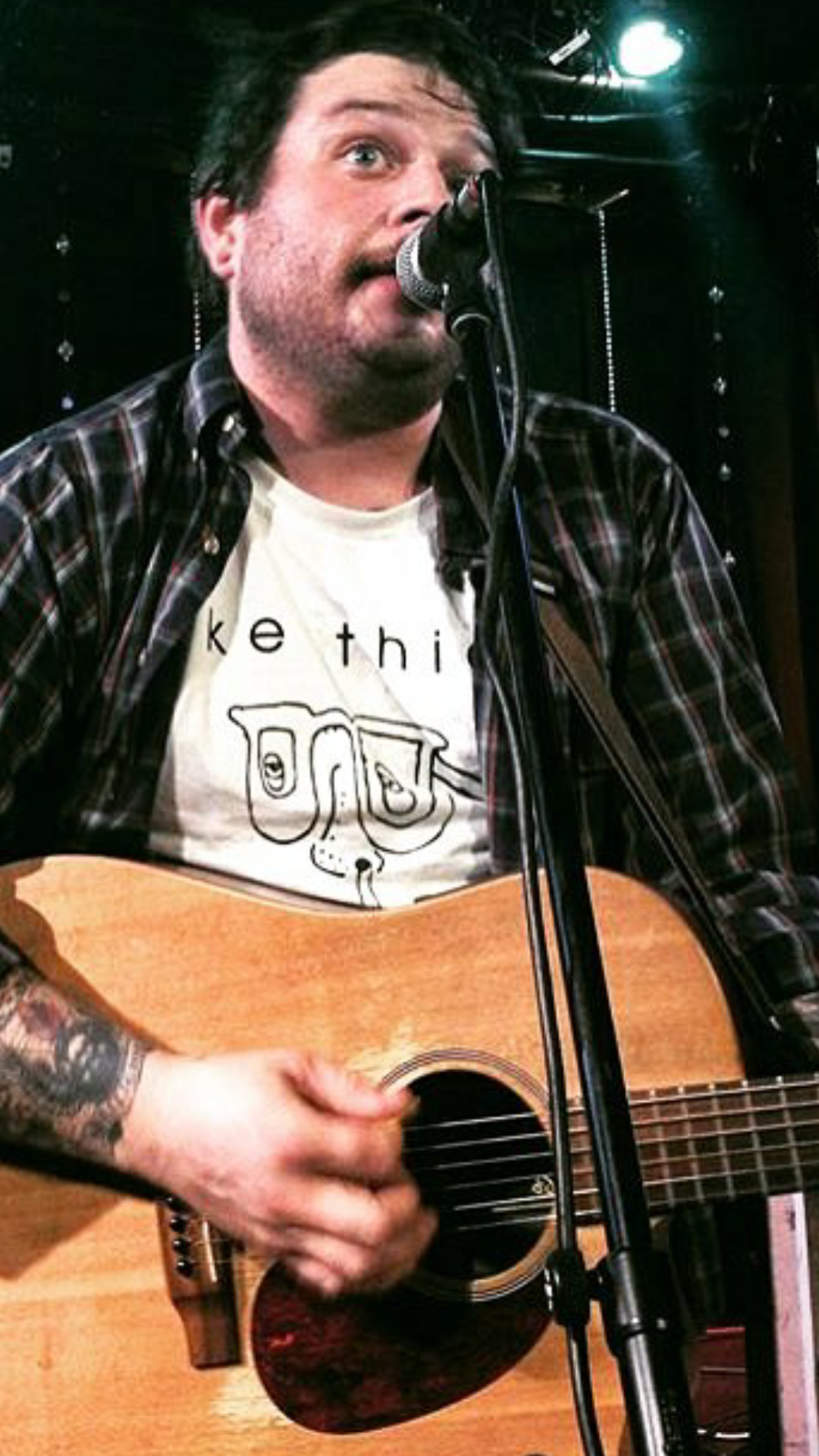

Background information
- Born: Derek M. Zanetti; Pittsburgh PA
- Label: A-F Records
- Website: thehomelessgospelchoir.com

The Homeless Gospel Choir is an American folk punk project by Pittsburgh, Pennsylvania–based musician Derek Zanetti. He is signed to A-F Records and has released seven albums to date.

His debut album, Some People Never Go Anywhere, was released in 2010, You Work So Hard to Be Like Everyone Else, in 2011, Luxury Problems, his third was released in 2012; and his fourth album, I Used To Be So Young, which was released in 2014, contains his hit song, "Untitled".

Most of his songs revolve around the topics of politics and mental health.

== Discography ==
- Some People Never Go Anywhere (2010)
- You Work So Hard Just to Be Like Everyone Else (2011)
- Luxury Problems (2012)
- I Used To Be So Young (2014)
- Normal (2017)
- This Land Is Your Landfill (2020)
- Fourth Dimension Intervention (2022)
