= Lee Bains & The Glory Fires =

American musical group

- Origin: Birmingham, Alabama, United States
- Genres: Southern rock, alternative rock, Americana, alternative country, country rock
- Years active: 2011–present
- Labels: Don Giovanni; Sub Pop; Alive Records
- Members: Lee Bains III; Blake Williamson; Adam Williamson

Lee Bains & The Glory Fires (sometimes stylized Lee Bains III & The Glory Fires) are an American alternative rock/Southern rock band, formed in 2011 in Birmingham, Alabama.

Their debut album, There is a Bomb in Gilead was released on Alive Records in 2012. The band followed that with Dereconstructed, released on Sub Pop Records in 2014.

In 2017, their third album Youth Detention///(Nail My Feet to the Southside of Town) was released by Don Giovanni Records. That November the band recorded a live album over two nights of shows at the Nick, released by Don Giovanni as Live at the Nick in 2018.

== Discography ==
=== Studio albums ===
Year	Title	Label	Format
2012	There Is a Bomb in Gilead	Alive Records	CD/12" vinyl LP/Digital
2014	Dereconstructed	Sub Pop	CD/12" vinyl LP/Digital
2017	Youth Detention///(Nail My Feet to the Southside of Town)	Don Giovanni Records	CD/2xLP Vinyl Record/Digital
2022	Old-Time Folks	Don Giovanni Records	CD/2xLP Vinyl Record/Digital

=== Live albums ===
Year	Title	Label	Format
2018	Live at the Nick	Don Giovanni Records	12" Vinyl LP/Digital

=== EPs ===
Year	Title	Label	Format
2013	Total Destruction to Your Mind	Alive Records	7" Single
2015	Sweet Disorder	Sub Pop	7" Single
