= Keith Secola =

American singer-songwriter

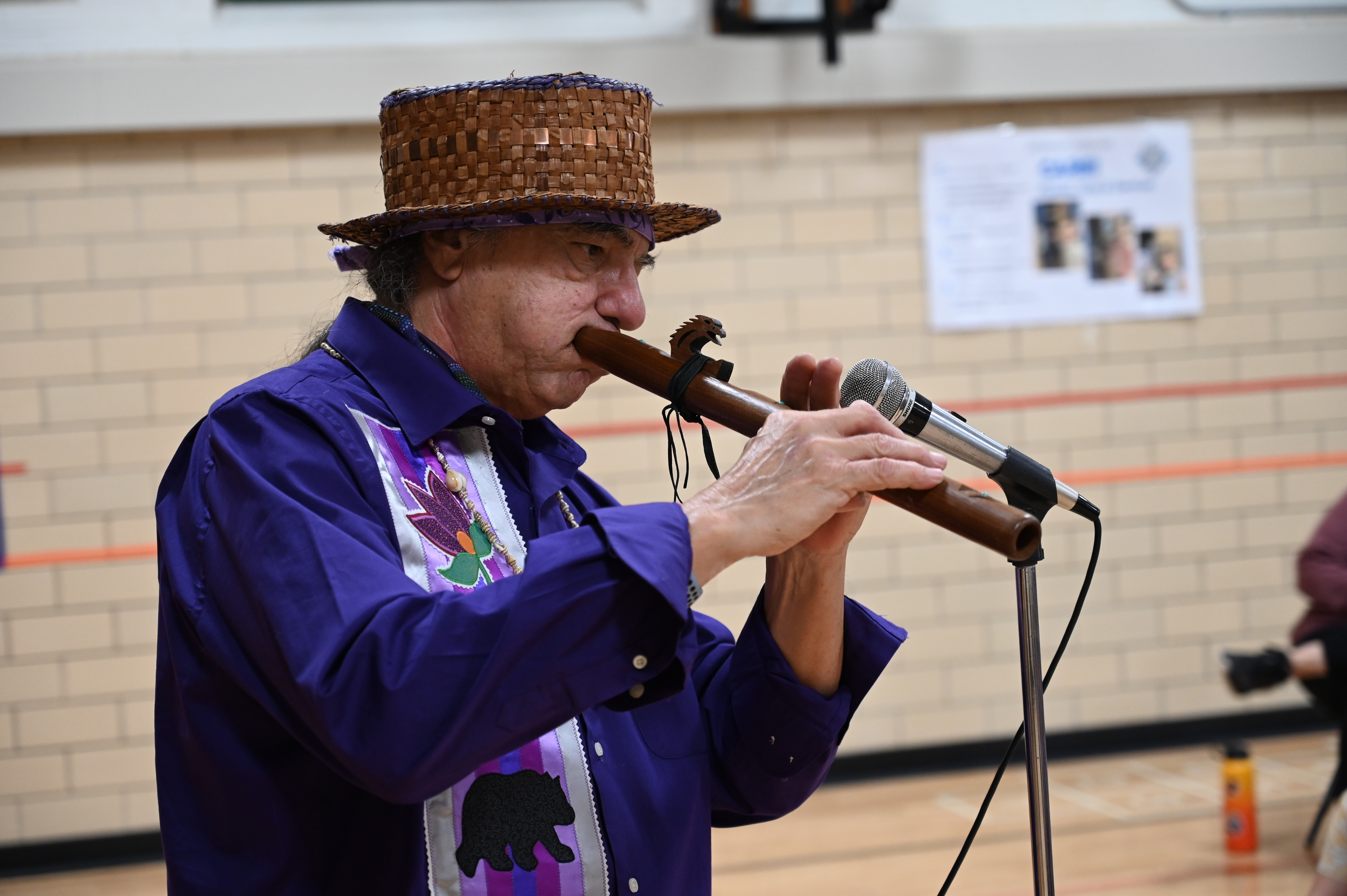
- Keith Secola playing the flute in 2023

Background information
- Genres: Indie rock, Folk rock, Folk
- Years active: 1990–Present
- Labels: Akina Records, Don Giovanni Records

Keith Secola is an Ojibwe-American musician who plays rock and roll, folk rock, and folk. A singer-songwriter, he also plays guitar and flute.

Secola won "best artist" at the 2006 Native American Music Awards for the album Native Americana.

As an activist he has worked with Irene Bedard on environmental and Native American issues.

== Discography ==
| Year | Title | Label | Format |
|---|---|---|---|
| 1992 | Circle | AKINA Records | CD |
| 1996 | Wild Band of Indians | AKINA Records | CD |
| 1999 | Fingermonkey | AKINA Records | CD |
| 2000 | Homeland | AKINA Records | CD |
| 2005 | Native Americana | AKINA Records | CD |
| 2012 | Life is Grand | AKINA Records | CD |
| 2017 | Circle | Don Giovanni Records | CD/LP/Digital |
| 2021 | Portals | Don Giovanni Records | CD/Digital |
