= Bad Bad Hats =

American rock band

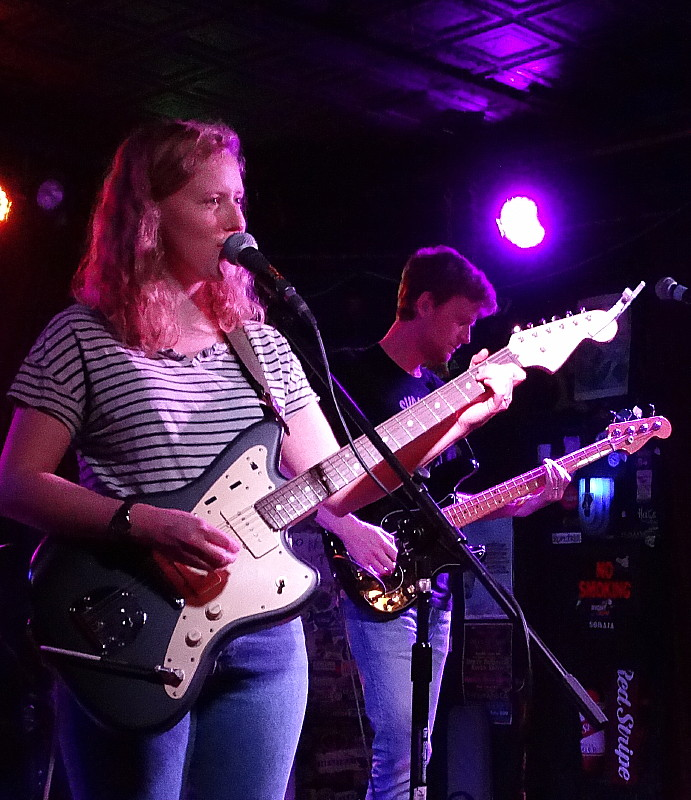
- Bad Bad Hats performing at The Saint in Asbury Park, NJ, May 2019.

Background information
- Origin: Minneapolis, Minnesota, United States
- Genres: Indie pop, pop-punk, folk rock, folk
- Years active: 2012–present
- Labels: Afternoon Records, Don Giovanni Records
- Members: Kerry Alexander; Chris Hoge; Connor Davison
- Past members: Noah Boswell
- Website: www.badbadhats.com

Bad Bad Hats is an American rock band formed in 2012 in Minneapolis, Minnesota. It is composed of Kerry Alexander, Chris Hoge, and Connor Davison. The band is named after a trouble-making character in the children's book Madeline.

The band has toured with notable artists, including Margaret Glaspy, Hippo Campus, Third Eye Blind, the Front Bottoms, and Michelle Branch.

== History ==
Kerry Alexander grew up in Birmingham, Alabama but moved to Florida when she was 15. She and Chris Hoge met while they were students at Macalester College in Saint Paul, Minnesota after finding each other's music on Myspace. Alexander had been performing "scrappy folk originals" and acoustic covers of "All the Small Things" by Blink-182 at solo-acoustic shows on campus. They initially joined forces to perform a duet. Once Alexander heard Hoge playing drums, she wanted to start a band, which they did in 2010. Fellow student Noah Boswell joined them on bass in 2012 at which time they formed Bad Bad Hats. The trio then started performing around Minneapolis–Saint Paul.

In the early days, the band alternated between acoustic and garage rock. The band began by releasing lo-fi demos via Bandcamp. These included kazoo solos, revised Shania Twain verses, and the indie-pop track Super America. In 2013 they released their debut EP, It Hurts. Bad Bad Hats first LP, Psychic Reader, was released in 2015 on Afternoon Records. Psychic Reader received positive reviews and resulted in more high-profile gigs, opening for bands such as Third Eye Blind and Margaret Glaspy.

In 2018, Bad Bad Hats released their second full-length album titled Lightning Round on Afternoon Records. This album and Psychic Reader were both produced by Brett Bullion, who helped develop the music's loose, organic feel. Shortly thereafter, Boswell left the band to attend graduate school.

In 2019, the band performed at South by Southwest.

In September 2021, Bad Bad Hats released their third LP, Walkman on Don Giovanni Records.

Bad Bad Hats released a self-titled fourth album on April 12, 2024.

== Reception ==
The band's music has been described as indie, pop-punk, folk, classic pop, influences by "90s rock simplicity and pop-punk frivolity."

Alexander's lyrics have been described as relatable, sincere, subtle, honest, unpredictable, and powerful.

Bad Bad Hats describe their style as indie rock, but have been described in Rolling Stone as likely to "break into Sixpence None the Richer's 'Kiss Me' at any moment" and going well with a latte at Starbucks. Their songs are described as expertly produced, with hooks and intriguing turns. Their sound is very pleasing, but some critics have called for more message, urgency, and purpose.

Critics in Pitchfork said that Psychic Reader had the same "unconventional structure and sticky melody" as found in Super America, but that the band's music had become richer, more varied, and more multidimensional.

Critics in Rolling Stone said that Lightning Round reflects the same blend of indie-pop, folk, and rock, but is even more refined and polished than Psychic Reader and has a "mid-tempo groove," and a richly-produced synth-pop sound reminiscent of Fleetwood Mac’s Tusk.

== Band members ==
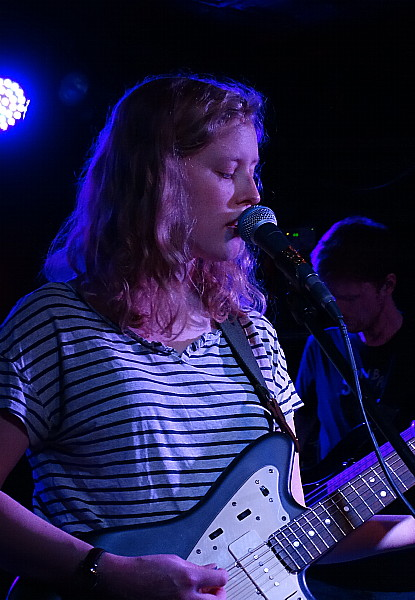
Kerry Alexander

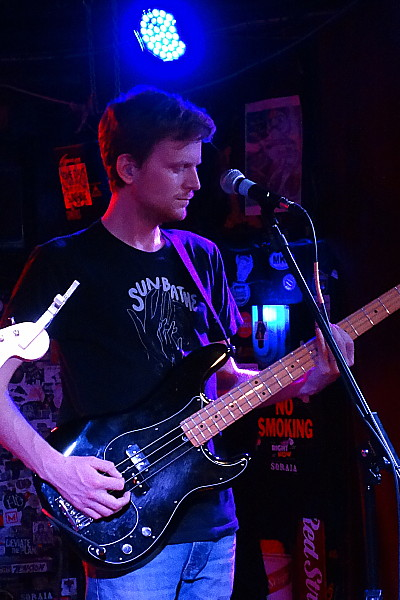
Chris Hoge

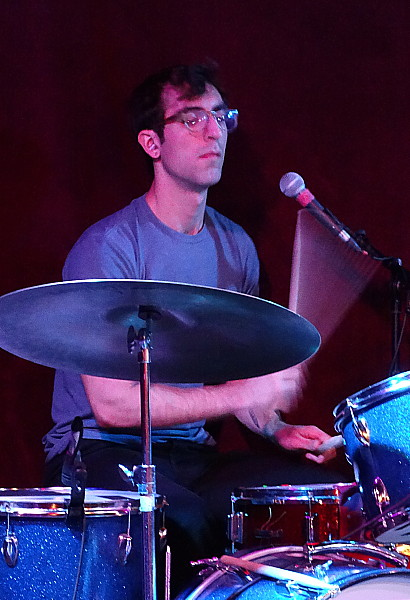
Connor Davison

== Discography ==
Studio albums

Year	Title	Label
2015	Psychic Reader	Afternoon Records
2018	Lightning Round	Afternoon Records
2021	Walkman	Don Giovanni Records
2024	Bad Bad Hats	Don Giovanni Records

EPs

Year	Title	Label
2012	Grow Up	Self Released
2013	It Hurts	Afternoon Records
2019	Wide Right	Self Released
