= Black Wine =

- Origin: New Brunswick, New Jersey, United States
- Genres: Punk rock Pop punk
- Years active: 2009–2015
- Labels: Don Giovanni
- Members: Jeffrey Schroeck; Miranda Taylor; J Nixon

Black Wine is an American punk rock band formed in 2009 in New Brunswick, New Jersey, United States, after Jeffrey Schroeck left The Ergs! and Miranda Taylor and J Nixon left Hunchback. The band has had four albums released on Don Giovanni Records.

== Discography ==
=== Albums ===
Year	Title	Label	Format
2009	Black Wine	Don Giovanni Records	12" vinyl LP
2011	Summer Of Indifference	Don Giovanni Records	12" vinyl LP
2012	Hollow Earth	Don Giovanni Records	12" vinyl LP
2014	Yell Boss	Don Giovanni Records	12" vinyl LP

=== EPs ===
Year	Title	Label	Format
2010	Dark Energy	Don Giovanni Records	7" vinyl
