= Sammus =

American rapper

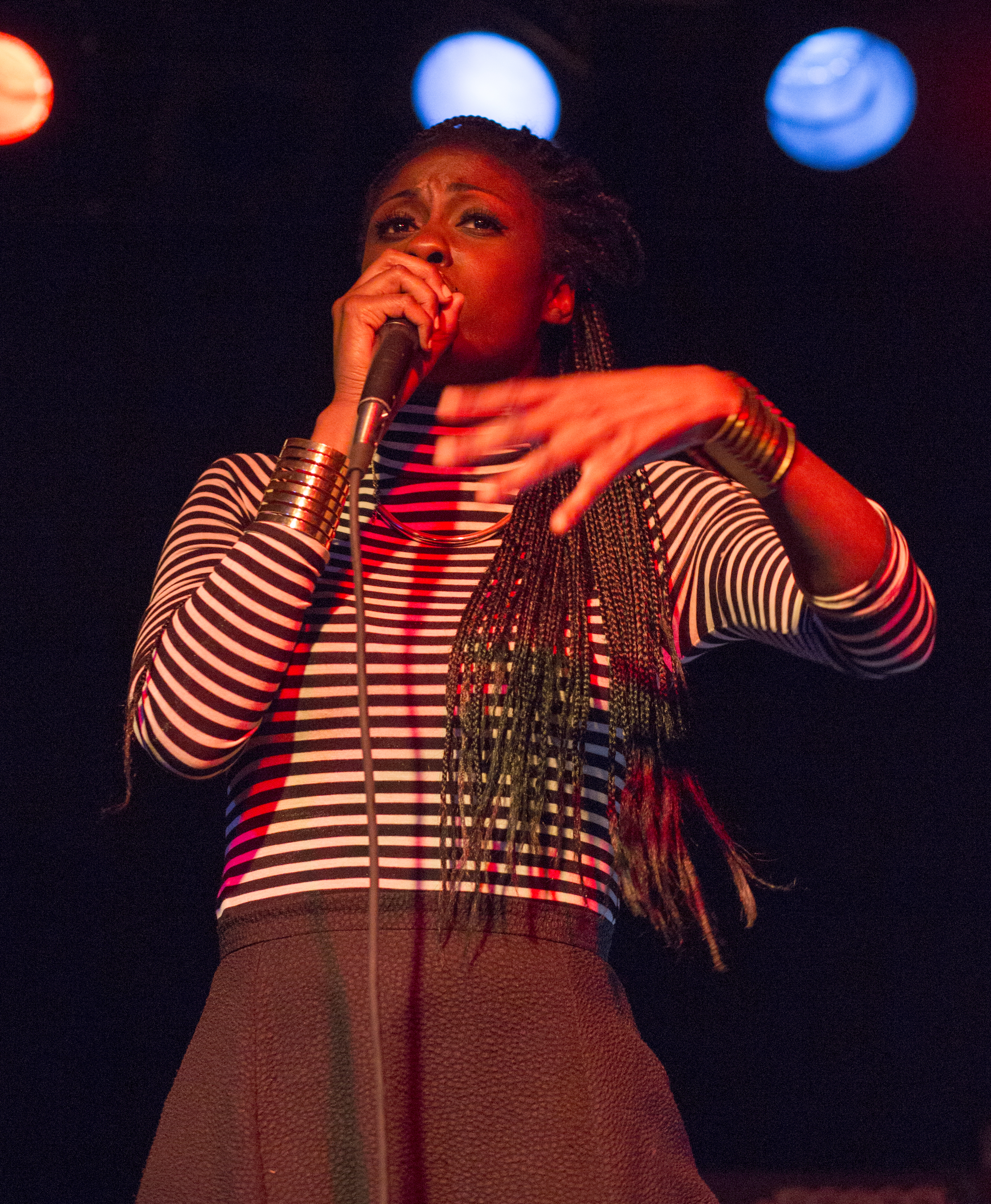
- Sammus at the Haunt in Ithaca, New York, in 2015

Background information
- Born: Enongo Ahou Lumumba-Kasongo; March 20, 1986 (age 40); Rhinebeck, New York
- Origin: Ithaca, New York, United States
- Genres: Hip hop, nerdcore
- Occupations: Rapper, songwriter, record producer, teacher
- Years active: 2010–present
- Labels: Nu-Black Music Group, Don Giovanni Records
- Website: sammusmusic.com

Enongo Ahou Lumumba-Kasongo (born March 20, 1986), known as Sammus (often stylized as SΔMMUS), is an American underground rapper, record producer, and academic.

== Early life ==
Enongo Lumumba-Kasongo was born in Rhinebeck, NY to an Ivorian mother and Congolese father. Patrice Lumumba, former Prime Minister of Congo, was her great-uncle. Her parents, both professors, moved her family to Ithaca, New York, at an early age, her mother teaching at Cornell University and her father at Wells College.

She began producing music in highschool under the name DJ Eno, first using the PlayStation program MTV Music Generator, and the digital audio workstation Reason to create beats. When she was trying to pick a new name for herself, a friend recommended the name Samus, after the main character of the Metroid series of games, since both are women in male dominated genres.

== Education ==
Sammus received a BA degree from Cornell University in 2008, double majoring in Science and technology studies and Sociology. She then worked full-time as teacher, in Houston, Texas, for Teach for America. Sammus then returned to Cornell in Fall 2011 to pursue an MA degree and doctorate in Science and Technology Studies, which she obtained in 2015 and 2019, respectively.

In 2019, Sammus was awarded a two-year Postdoctoral Fellowship in Music at the Cogut Institute for the Humanities at Brown University, focusing on the aesthetics and techniques of music of the African diaspora. As of 2025 she is the David S. Josephson Assistant Professor in the Brown University Department of Music.

== Music ==
Sammus' influences started with her older brother Disashi (formerly a member of Gym Class Heroes), who exposed her both to video games and alternative rock bands like Weezer and Nirvana. In addition, Sammus has stated that she has been heavily influenced by Kanye West, particularly his debut album The College Dropout:

It just hit me at the right time. I was about to go into college, and I think prior to that album dropping, I hadn't felt like I could have a voice in hip hop. What [was] represented were two sides of the spectrum: you had 'I have a lot of money, and I do a lot of cool things with my money'—hip hop that was on MTV—and then there was the super lyrical, very conscious, Mos Def, 'let's talk about the system.' And I didn't feel qualified to contribute to any of that discussion, because my problems were kind of like: 'uhh, I don't want to go to school...' And here was Kanye West talking specifically about 'I don't want to go to school!'

— Sammus, The Ithacast

Sammus released her debut EP Fly Nerd in 2010. She followed up with the album M'Other Brain in 2012. After Mega Ran was exposed to Sammus' music, the two began collaborating. In 2013, within a few hours of releasing her second album, Prime, it became the bestselling rap album on Bandcamp. In December 2013, Sammus launched a Kickstarter campaign for her fourth album, a concept album based on Metroid. This album, Another M earned her fans of the nerdcore subgenre. In various interviews and social media, Sammus has clarified that she doesn't identify herself as a nerdcore rapper, and instead prefers the term "Afrofuturism" to refer to her video-game centered music because it requires an engagement with her Blackness.

== Performances ==
Sammus has toured the U.S. with Mega Ran on the Rappers with Arm Cannons tour in 2015. She has performed at the SXSW Music Festival since 2015, the Penny Arcade Expo (PAX East) in 2015, Geek Girl Con in 2014 and 2015 with plans to return in 2016. She has also performed at the east coast's music and gaming festival, MAGFest, in 2015, 2016 and 2024. In June 2017 she performed at McCarren park in Greenpoint Brooklyn as part of the Northside Festival.

== Discography ==
- 2010 - Fly Nerd (EP, self-released)
- 2012 - M'Other Brain (NuBlack Music Group)
- 2012 - Reset: Instrumentals (self-released)
- 2013 - Prime (NuBlack Music Group)
- 2013 - Nerdcore Instrumentals: Castlevania Edition (with DJ Cutman)
- 2013 - Castlevania: The Nocturnal Cantata (Joypad Records)
- 2014 - Another M (NuBlack Music Group)
- 2014 - Nerdcore Instrumentals 2 (with DJ Cutman)
- 2016 - InFusion (EP, NuBlack Music Group)
- 2016 - Pieces in Space (Don Giovanni Records)
