= P.S. Eliot =

Birmingham, Alabama-based pop punk band

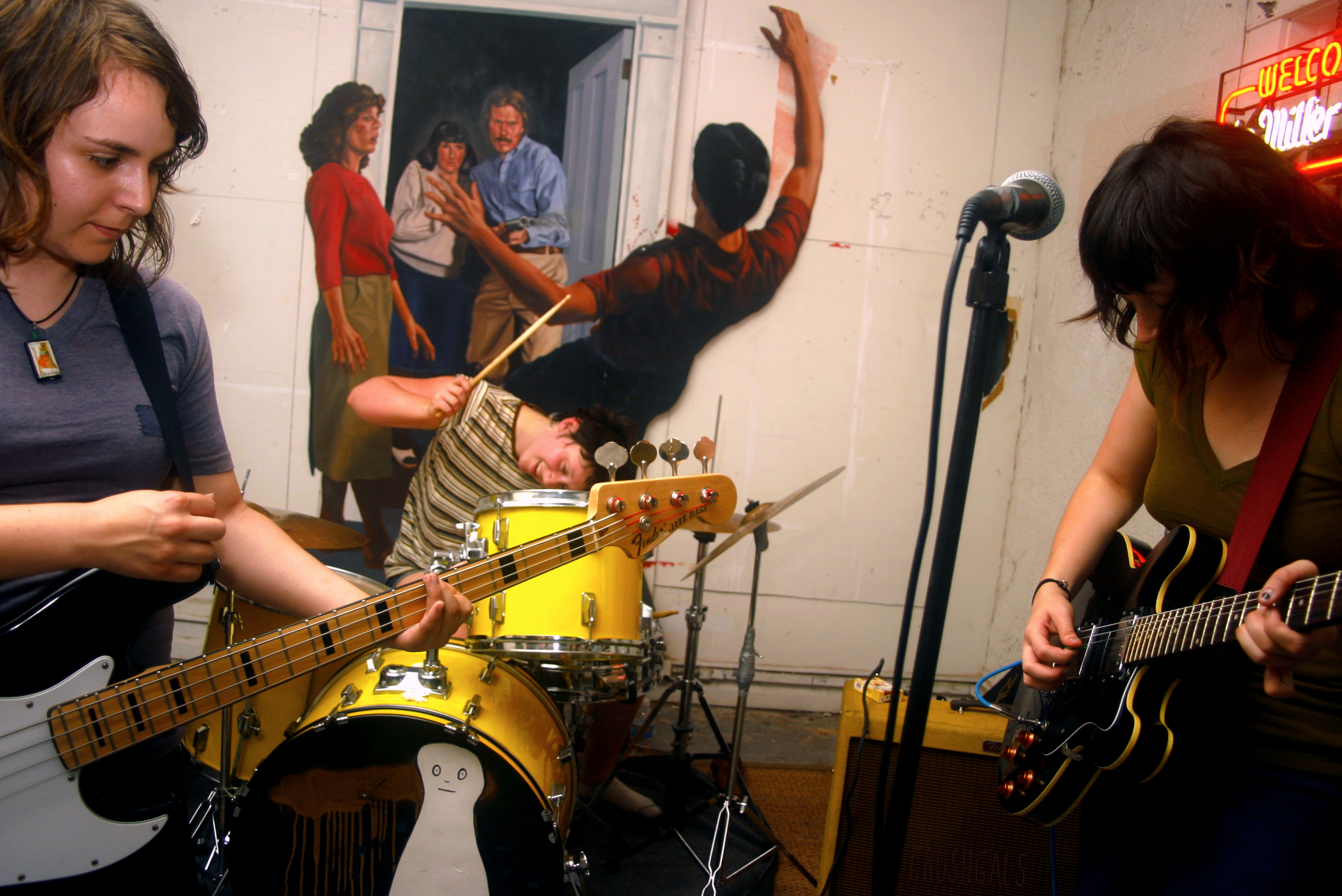
- P.S. Eliot at Magic City Wholesale, Birmingham, AL. August 2009.

Background information
- Origin: Birmingham, Alabama, U.S.
- Genres: Indie rock, pop punk
- Years active: 2007–2011, 2016
- Labels: Salinas Records, Don Giovanni Records
- Spinoffs: Waxahatchee; Swearin'
- Members: Katie Crutchfield; Allison Crutchfield; Will Granger; Katherine Simonetti
- Past members: Kate Eldridge

P.S. Eliot was an American pop punk band formed in 2007 in Birmingham, Alabama, United States, by twin sisters Katie (guitars, vocals) and Allison Crutchfield (drums). They released two albums: Introverted Romance in Our Troubled Minds (2009) and Sadie (2011), both on Salinas Records. After the band broke up in 2011, both members pursued their own musical projects: Katie started Waxahatchee and Allison started Swearin'. The band reunited in June 2016 for a tour, which took place the following September.

== History ==
Katie and Allison Crutchfield formed their first band, the Ackleys, in high school, along with Michael McClellan and Carter Wilson. They recorded some music on a small label run by Aaron Hamilton, owner of the Birmingham venue Cave 9 before its members went to different colleges, resulting in the band splitting up. This led the Crutchfields to form a new band, P.S. Eliot, after which they began touring and releasing albums relentlessly.

Their first release was the Bike Wreck Demo in 2008, followed by their first full-length Introverted Romance in Our Troubled Minds on Salinas in 2009, an EP titled Living in Squalor in 2010, and another full-length, Sadie, in 2011.

In 2012, the band posted a 15-song release on Bandcamp called Demonstrations, which includes demos and home-recordings of songs from across their discography.

Critic Robert Christgau reviewed both of the band's full-length albums, writing of the 2011's Sadie: "Simultaneously hesitant and forthright, singer Katie Crutchfield sounds above all brave as she pronounces and occasionally mispronounces her lyrics, which dwell on botched communication both verbal and emotional ... Always there is the sound of becoming that the young treasure for one reason and the ex-young value for quite another."

P.S. Eliot was an explicitly feminist band, a spirit that grew out of their experiences operating within a male-dominated punk scene. In a 2012 interview with The New York Times, Katie said: "It was a hypermasculine scene where we were sort of being alienated without even realizing it at first. The people in that scene can be sort of rotten, and you just pick up on it really quickly."

They have attributed their inspiration to start P.S. Eliot to when the So So Glos played a show in their home state of Alabama.

== Disbandment ==
P.S. Eliot disbanded in 2011. The band felt that they had done everything creatively that they wanted to do. "We all got to a point where we wanted different things out of making music and everything we wanted to do from when we started we had definitely accomplished," Katie said in 2013. "I was kind of in the driver's seat for every decision that we made, and I wrote all the songs ... It sort of got a point where it didn't seem like that was working out for my band mates and they didn't seem like they were having too much fun doing that, and especially Allison."

The Crutchfields' decision to split up their band was also influenced by the fact that they were each living in different cities and had other musical projects they considered more important. They played their farewell show on December 9 at Death By Audio in Brooklyn.

== Reunion ==
In June 2016, The Crutchfields announced that they would reunite P.S. Eliot for a tour that September. A compilation of the band's complete discography, titled 2007–2011, was released on September 2 on Don Giovanni Records.

== Other projects ==
While playing in P.S. Eliot, Allison and Katie also both played in Bad Banana.

Katie also recorded solo under the name King Everything.

The Crutchfield sisters formed the band Snocaps in 2025 along with MJ Lenderman and Brad Cook.

== Discography ==
Year	Title	Label	Format
2008	The Bike Wreck Demo	Self-release	CD-R, Download
2009	Introverted Romance in Our Troubled Minds	Salinas	12" vinyl LP, Download
2010	Living in Squalor EP	Freedom School Records	7" vinyl EP, Download
2011	Sadie	Salinas	12" vinyl LP, Download
2016	2007–2011	Don Giovanni Records	2xCD, Download
