= Mal Blum =

American musician

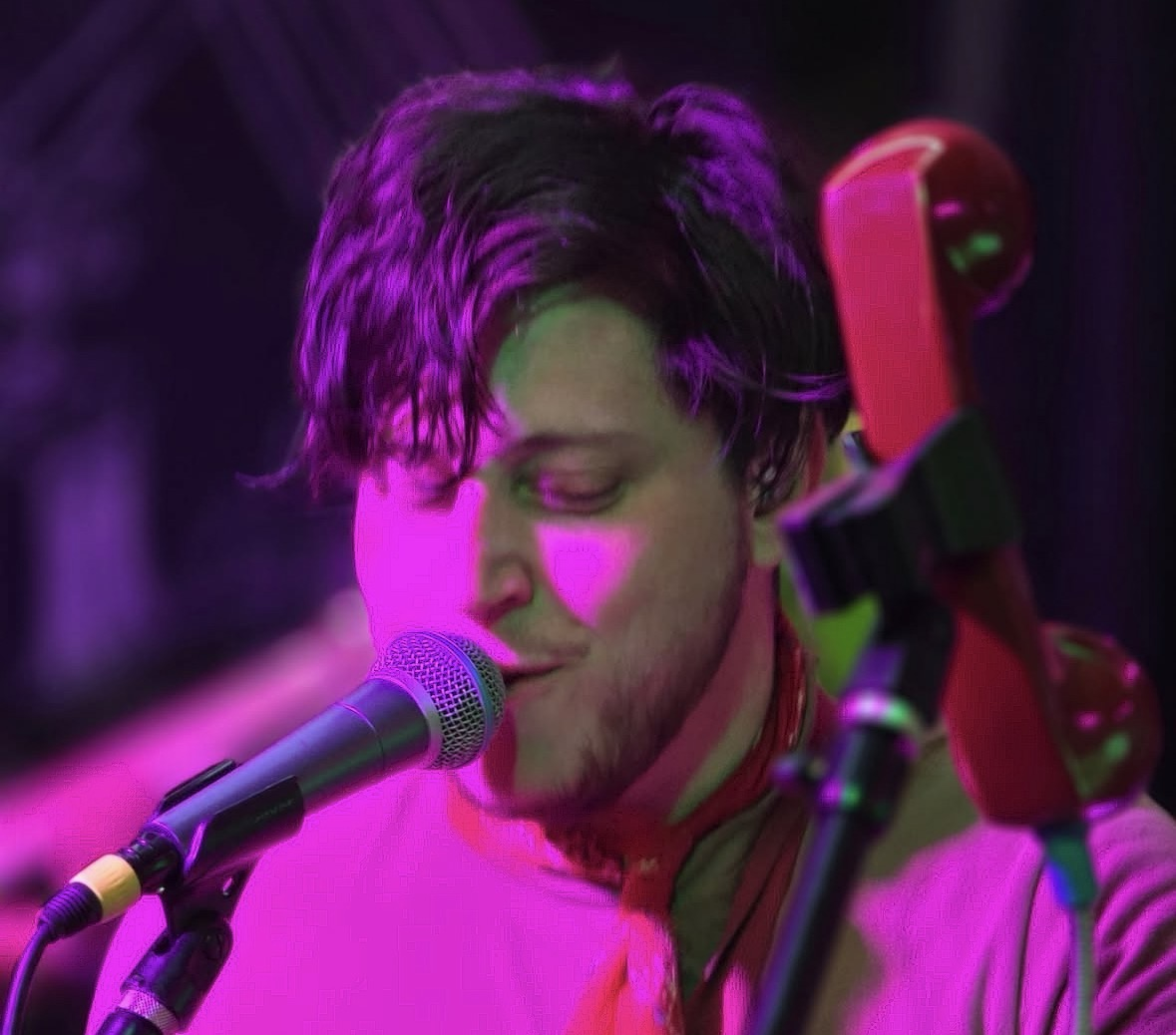
- Blum performing live in 2026.

Background information
- Genres: Indie rock; Americana; Folk punk
- Occupations: Musician, singer-songwriter
- Instruments: Vocals, guitar
- Years active: 2008–present
- Labels: Don Giovanni Records; Saddle Creek Records; Get Better Records
- Website: malblum.com

Mal Blum is an American songwriter, musician, writer, live performer and comedian. Blum has released six full-length albums, either self-released or on independent record labels, the most recent being The Villain (2025).

== Career ==
Blum spent their (Note: Blum is non-binary and transgender and uses they/them and he/him pronouns.) early career promoting self-booked DIY solo tours and also self-released their early albums before signing to record labels.

In 2014, they signed to punk label Don Giovanni Records and announced they would be working on a new album produced by Marissa Paternoster of the band Screaming Females. After the Don Giovanni release of You Look a Lot Like Me in 2015, Blum began touring nationally with a band, contributing to what critics called a "more developed but still gritty, punk" sound.

Blum was a recurring musical and comedic guest on The Chris Gethard Show. They have also appeared as a musical guest on the Welcome to Night Vale (WTNV) podcast and have toured extensively as a musical guest and opener for WTNV's National and International live shows in 2018, 2019, 2023, and 2026.

In February 2019 Blum released a new single, "Things Still Left To Say", and in March 2019 they toured with Lucy Dacus. That year they released the album Pity Boy, recorded with Joe Reinhart of Hop Along at Headroom Studios in Philadelphia. Pitchfork's Abby Jones categorized Pity Boy as a shift "into potent pop-punk that recalls both Hop Along and Titus Andronicus", noting the newfound focus on guitarist Audrey Zee Whitesides' electric riffs, while maintaining the lyrics as "the album's centerpiece" writes Jones,

If the electric guitar had evolved into a supporting actor by Blum’s last album, 2016’s You Look a Lot Like Me, then it’s the lead on Pity Boy. The nimble, vigorous riffs [...] ricocheting like rubber balls around “I Don’t Want To” and “Not My Job” with Blum’s vocals surging in countermelody.

Max Cohen, in their review for Bandcamp's "Album of the Day" series, writes of Pity Boy's production value:

It’s punk in spirit, but the production is rich and warm, wrapping the power chords and solos in a sunny, welcoming fuzz. At their best, as on the jangly opener “Things Still Left to Say,” they sound like The Buzzcocks, if The Buzzcocks opted for compassion instead of bile.

On October 20, 2020 Blum announced a new single to be released on Saddle Creek Records as part of the label's 7 inch series.

In August 2020, Mal Blum was tapped to write music for Season 2 of Netflix's Trinkets television show. They wrote the song "Passenger Seat" to be used in a recurring story arc for the character Elodie.

Blum signed a publishing deal with Terrorbird Media seemingly during this same time period and began contributing music to other TV and film projects. Upon co-writing with other artists on the roster, they forged a connection with Kyle Andrews and together the two worked remotely during the pandemic on a collection of 6 songs that would ultimately become the EP "Ain't it Nice".

On April 15, 2022 Mal Blum released "Ain't it Nice" which critics described musically as "a bridge between indie rock and Americana".

Thematically, writer Mel Woods described the EP as

a dust-covered collection of tracks that wouldn’t sound out of place in a wayward diner off the side of the highway. Drawing inspiration from John Prine, Bruce Springsteen and others, Blum has crafted a record steeped in pandemic loneliness and the messiness of queer and trans masculinity.

On February 11, 2023 Blum announced plans to record a new full-length album with producer Jessica Boudreaux of the band Summer Cannibals.

On April 30, 2025, Blum announced new Album The Villain to be released in July of 2025.

== Film and television ==
In addition to contributing songs to film and television projects, Blum has also appeared in a number of comedic film projects in acting, voice acting or improvisational roles

== Personal life ==
Blum is openly transgender transmasculine and queer. They have spoken about their voice changing while recording "Ain't it Nice" in 2020.

They attended State University of New York at Purchase. They are Jewish. Hannah Fleischman of Hey Alma magazine wrote:

Although their songs’ subject matters often touch on heavier subjects, Blum’s dry approach to otherwise difficult topics typifies Jewish humor.

Blum was diagnosed with ADHD at a young age.

Blum was engaged to former Buzzfeed personality Gabe Dunn in 2021. Blum and Dunn have since broke up.

== Discography ==
Albums
Title	Album details
Goodnight Sugarpop	Released: 2008; Label: self-released
Every Time You Go Somewhere	Released: 2010; Label: self-released
Tempest in a Teacup	Released: 2013; Label: self-released
You Look a Lot Like Me	Released: 2015; Label: Don Giovanni Records
Pity Boy	Released: July 12, 2019; Label: Don Giovanni Records
The Villain	Released: July 11, 2025; Label: Get Better Records
The Villain (Deluxe Edition)	Released: Nov 21, 2025; Label: Get Better Records

EPs
Title	EP details
Ain't It Nice	Released: April 15, 2022; Label: self-released

Singles
Title	Single details
"Nobody Waits" / "San Cristobal"	Released: November 20, 2020; Label: Saddle Creek Records
"Xmas Eve"	Released: December 1, 2023; Label: self-released
"I'm So Bored"	Released: April 30, 2025; Label: Get Better Records

== See also ==
- LGBT culture in New York City
- List of LGBT people from New York City
- NYC Pride March
