= Don Giovanni Records =

American independent music label

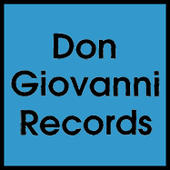
- Founded: 2003
- Founder: Joe Steinhardt; Zach Gajewski
- Distributor: Redeye
- Genre: Alternative rock, indie rock, punk rock, experimental, hip hop
- Country of origin: United States
- Location: New Brunswick, New Jersey; Philadelphia, Pennsylvania, Lansing, Michigan
- Official website: www.dongiovannirecords.com

Don Giovanni Records is an independent record label originally specializing in punk rock from the New Brunswick, New Jersey music scene but eventually working with a variety of artists from different genres. It has also operated out of Lansing, Michigan.

== History ==
Don Giovanni Records was founded by Joe Steinhardt and Zach Gajewski while they were living in Boston in 2003. Steinhardt and Gajewski started the label while playing in bands and attending college at Boston University, where the two had met. After graduation they moved to New Brunswick, where Steinhardt was from, in order to make the label a full-time operation.

The label is best known for developing artists like LSD and the Search for God, Screaming Females, Mitski, Waxahatchee, Laura Stevenson, Moor Mother, and Irreversible Entanglements, as well as fostering a geographically diverse community of artists, including Mal Blum, Native American Music Award “Best Artist” winner Keith Secola, Holy Modal Rounders founder, Peter Stampfel, Lavender Country, Swamp Dogg, Alice Bag, and comedian Chris Gethard.

In 2016, Steinhardt launched the New Alternative Music Festival.

The label has been vocally critical of Record Store Day and streaming music as well as other social issues within the music industry.

In 2020 the label relocated to Philadelphia, Pennsylvania.

== Roster ==
Artists such as Screaming Females, Moor Mother, Mitski, Laura Stevenson, Waxahatchee, Bad Bad Hats, LSD and the Search for God, Sammus, Downtown Boys, The Ergs!, Swamp Dogg, Priests, Tenement, P.S. Eliot, Jeffrey Lewis, Peter Stampfel, Worriers, Paisley Fields, and Lavender Country as well as comedian Chris Gethard have released records on Don Giovanni. The label has also published books from authors Larry Livermore and Bela Koe-Krompecher.

== See also ==
- List of record labels
- DIY ethic
- The Court Tavern
