= Suicide Squeeze Records discography =

- Studio albums: 50+
- EPs: 40+
- Compilation albums: 2
- Singles: 30+

The following is a complete discography for Suicide Squeeze Records, an independent record label in Seattle, Washington. Founded in 1996, the label mostly releases rock, pop, and metal, as well as occasional comedy and performance art CD and DVDs. Formats also include 12-inch and 7-inch vinyl.

The label got its start releasing singles by artists such as Elliott Smith and Modest Mouse, later releasing albums by bands such as the Melvins and These Arms Are Snakes. Suicide Squeeze has released a number of compilation albums as well, and the current artists are The Coathangers, Nü Sensae, This Will Destroy You, Audacity, Guantanamo Baywatch, White Woods, and Yamantaka // Sonic Titan.

== Discography ==
Releases by Suicide Squeeze Records
Yr	Cat	Release title	Primary artist(s)	Format
1996	S-001	Now You're Swimming	764-HERO	7-inch
1996	S-002	"The Epilogue Fits B/W l.g.a"	The Scenic Vermont	7-inch single
1996	S-003	"A Life of Arctic Sounds"	Modest Mouse	7-inch single
1997	S-004	Worse Further South	The Scenic Vermont	12-inch EP
1997	S-005	"Division Day"	Elliott Smith	7-inch/CD single
1997	S-006	We're Solids	764-HERO	CDEP
1998	S-007	Removable Parts	Track Star	7-inch
1998	S-008	Whenever You See Fit	Modest Mouse / 764-HERO	CDEP
1999	S-009	Fransse	Pennsy's Electric Workhorses Songs	7-inch
n/a	S-010	Discography	Evergreen	unreleased
2000	S-011	Progress	Pedro the Lion	CDEP /7"
2000	S-012	Naima	Red Stars Theory	7-inch
2001	S-013	Girls	The Magic Magicians	CD
2001	S-014	S/T	Red Stars Theory	CDEP
200	S-015	Attraction Action Reaction	The Aislers Set	7-inch
2001	S-016	Between the Machines	The Black Heart Procession	7-inch
2001	S-017	This Is What I Know About Being Gigantic	Minus the Bear	CDEP
2002	S-018	Things Shaped in Passing	The Six Parts Seven	CD
2002	S-019	Bird's Fly	Aspera	CDEP
2002	S-020	The Modern Sinner Nervous Man EP	The Constantines	CDEP
2002	S-021	Highly Refined Pirates	Minus the Bear	CD
2002	S-022	"I Heard the Bells On"	Pedro the Lion	7-inch
2002	S-023	Bands Like It When You Yell "Yar!" at Them	Minus the Bear	CD/EP
2002	S-024	Mission Bells	The Aislers Set	12-inch
2002	S-025	How I Learned to Write Backwards	The Aislers Set	CD
2003	S-026	Bitches Ain't Shit but Good People	Hella	CDEP
2003	S-027	S/T	The Magic Magicians	CD
2003	S-028	"Pretty (Ugly Before)"	Elliott Smith	7-inch single
2003	S-029	The Six Parts Seven/The Black Keys EP	The Six Parts Seven / The Black Keys	CDEP
2003	S-030	Lost Notes From Forgotten Songs	The Six Parts Seven	CD
2004	S-031	The Devil Isn't Red	Hella	LP
2003	S-032	Revolve	The Melvins	7-inch
2003	S-033	"The First Noel"	Pedro the Lion	7-inch single
2004	S-034	Fading Vibes	Les Savy Fav	7-inch
2004	S-035	Young Days	Hint Hint	CD
2004	S-036	Wolves With Pretty Lips	We Ragazzi	CD
2004	S-037	The Unicorns: 2014	The Unicorns	CDEP
2004	S-038	Tour Only EP	Hint Hint	CDEP
2004	S-039	Puking and Crying	S	CD
2004	S-040	Everywhere, and Right Here	The Six Parts Seven	CD
2004	S-041	Masculine Drugs	Zach Hill and Holy Smokes	CD/Book
2004	S-042	The Absurd Nightclub Comedy of…	Eugene Mirman	CD/DVD
2005	S-043	Blocked Numbers	Crystal Skulls	CD
2005	S-044	Church Gone Wild/Chirpin Hard	2X Hella	CD
2005	S-045	Headphones	Headphones	CD/LP
2005	S-046	I Got a Brand New Egg Layin' Machine	Goon Moon	CD/LP
2005	S-047	Menos El Oso	Minus the Bear	CD/LP
2005	S-048	"God Rest Ye Merry Gentlemen"	Pedro the Lion	7-inch single
2006	S-049	Socialize	Metal Hearts	CD
2006	S-050	Slaying Since 1996	2X	CD
2006	S-051	Outgoing Behavior	Crystal Skulls	CD
2006	S-052	Casually Smashed to Pieces	The Six Parts Seven	CD/LP
2006	S-053	Voltaic Crusher/Undrum to Muted Da	Of Montreal	7-inch
2006	S-054	Cosmic Door EP	Crystal Skulls	CDEP
2006	S-055	"Stormy High"	Black Mountain	7-inch single
2006	S-056	"Answers and Questions"	Earlimart	7-inch single
2006	S-057	This Harness Can't Ride Anything	Chin Up Chin Up	CD
2006	S-058	"Upper Ninety"	Russian Circles	single
2006	S-059	Hello, Dear Wind	Page France	CD
2006	S-060	"Horse Girl"	These Arms are Snakes	7-inch single
2007	S-061	Away in a Manger	Dave Bazan	7-inch
2007	S-062	Interpretaciones del Oso	Minus the Bear	CD
2007	S-063	…and the Family Telephone	Page France	CD/LP
2007	S-064	Tomato Morning	Page France	CD/EP
2007	S-065	Planet of Ice	Minus the Bear	CD
2007	S-066	…and the Bonus Telephone	Page France	Digital EP
2007	S-067	Planet of Ice	Minus the Bear	Bonus Disc EP
2008	S-068	"Perfect Skin"	HEALTH	7-inch single
2008	S-069	"Shake Shake"	The Coathangers	7-inch single
2008	S-070	Station	Russian Circles	CD
2008	S-071	Strange Symmetry	Past Lives	CD/LP
2008	S-072	"Zodiac Girls"	Black Moth Super Rainbow	7-inch
2008	S-073	Silent Grips	School of Seven Bells	7-inch
2008	S-074	They Make Beer Commercials Like This	Minus the Bear	CDEP/12"
2008	S-075	sBACH	sBACH	CD
2008	S-076	Moody Motorcycle	Human Highway	CD/LP
2008	S-077	Jingle Bells	David Bazan	7-inch
2008	S-078	Tail Swallower and Dove	These Arms are Snakes	CD/LP
2009	S-079	Paranoid Cocoon	Cotton Jones	CD/LP
2009	S-080	Acoustics	Minus the Bear	LP
2009	S-081	Scramble	The Coathangers	CD/LP
2009	S-082	Geneva	Russian Circles	CD
2009	S-083	"Merry X-Mas (War is Over)"	David Bazan	7-inch single
2009	S-084	"Washburn"	These Arms are Snakes	digital single
2010	S-085	Tapestry of Webs	Past Lives	CD/LP
2010	S-086	Tall Hours in the Glowstream	Cotton Jones	CD/LP
2010	S-087	143 b/w Arthritis Sux	The Coathangers	7-inch (remixes)
2010	S-088	"Mellow Out b/w Heavy Days"	JEFF the Brotherhood	7-inch single
2010	S-089	Chicken 30 b/w Strawberry Dreams	The Coathangers / The Numerators	7-inch
2010	S-090	Caregiver b/w Heirloom	Memoryhouse	7-inch
2010	S-091	Wish My Kids Were Here b/w I Heard the Bells on…	David Bazan	7-inch
2011	S-092	Sit Beside Your Vegetables	Cotton Jones	Digital EP
2011	S-093	Tunnel Blanket	This Will Destroy You	CD/2×LP
2011	S-094	La La La La Love You	Nobunny	7-inch
2011	S-095	Larceny and Old Lace	The Coathangers	CD/LP
2011	S-096	Visits	Tammar	CD/LP
2011	S-097	"Lone Runner"	Dirty Beaches	7-inch single
2011	S-098	"Black Dunes"	This Will Destroy You	7-inch single
2011	S-099	Searching Through The Past	Bleached	7-inch EP
2014	S-100	Suicide Squeeze Records Presents: Forever Singles	Various Artists	LP
2012	S-101	Wild Desire	King Tuff	7-inch
2012	S-102	Where Did You Go	White Woods	7-inch
2012	S-103	Smother b/w No Crees Que Ya Cansa	The Coathangers / Davila 666	7-inch
2012	S-104	Tea Swamp Park	Nu Sensae	Digital EP
2012	S-105	"One More Try"	Iron and Wine	7-inch single
2012	S-106	"Schadenfreude"	Wax Idols	7-inch single
2012	S-107	Sundowning	Nu Sensae	CD/LP
201	S-108	The World Is Too Much With Us	Peace	LP
2012	S-109	"Generator"	Gap Dream	7-inch single
2012	S-110	"Merry Go Round b/w Toasted"	The Coathangers / Heavy Cream	7-inch single
2013	S-111	"Pacing"	Julianna Barwick	7-inch single
2013	S-112	"Big Talking"	White Woods	7-inch single
2013	S-113	Dead	Numerators	7-inch
2013	S-114	"Finders Keepers"	Audacity	7-inch single
2013	S-115	Derek's Song b/w Throw	The Coathangers / Nü Sensae	7-inch
2013	S-116	"Two Strong Hits"	Destruction Unit	7-inch single
2013	S-117	Dying in the Pussy	Antwon	7-inch
2012	S-118	YT//ST	Yamantaka // Sonic Titan	CD/LP
2013	S-119	"Brainwash"	La Luz	7-inch single
2013	S-120	Too Tired	Meat Market	7-inch
2013	S-121	Adderall b/w Earthbot	The Coathangers / Audacity	7-inch
2013	S-122	Butter Knife	Audacity	CD/LP
2013	S-123	Acoustics II	Minus the Bear	LP
2013	S-124	UZU	Yamantaka // Sonic Titan	LP, digital
	S-125	TBA		
2013	S-126	"Surf N Turf EP"	Natural Child / Guantanamo Baywatch	7-inch single
2013	S-127	"Burn"	Eating Out	7-inch single
2014	S-128	Suck My Shirt	The Coathangers	CD/LP
2014	S-129	"Mama b/w Love Kin"	Shannon and the Clams / Guantanamo Baywatch	7-inch single
2014	S-130	Fort George EP	Various Artists	7-inch
2015	S-138	Oh Man, Cover the Ground	Shana Cleveland & The Sandcastles	CD/LP
2017		VOIDS	Minus the Bear	CD
