= Suicide Squeeze Records =

US record label

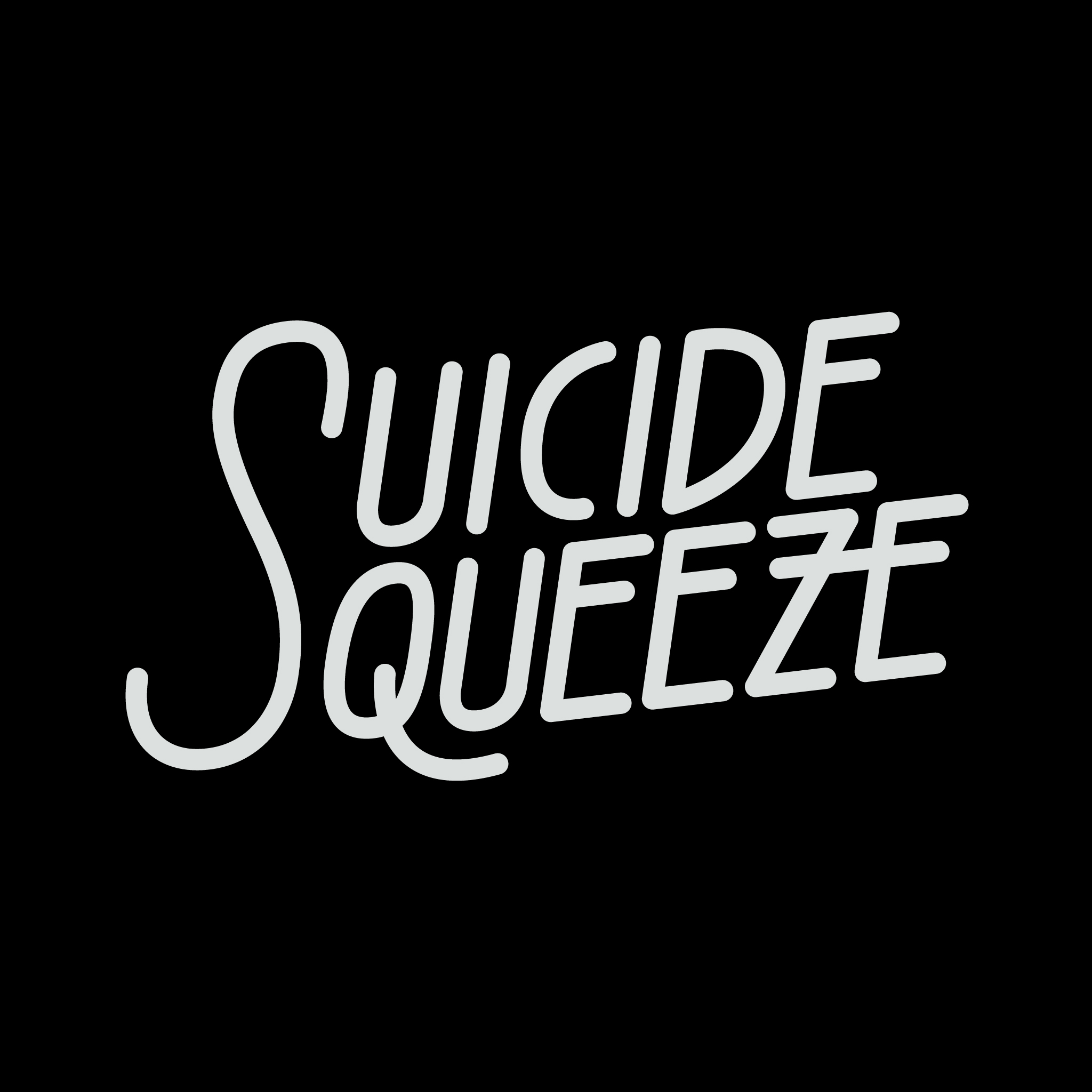
- Founded: 1996
- Founder: David Dickenson
- Distributor: Secretly Distribution
- Genre: Rock (punk, indie, grunge, alt, experimental), postrock, metal (drone, sludge), pop (experimental, indie), performance art, standup comedy
- Country of origin: United States
- Location: Seattle, Washington
- Official website: suicidesqueeze.net

Suicide Squeeze Records is an independent record label, based in Seattle, Washington, United States, that releases rock, pop, and metal music. Suicide Squeeze releases content on vinyl, CD, cassette, and digital. The label has also released comedy and performance art CD and DVDs.

Founded in 1996 by David Dickenson, it got its start releasing singles by artists such as Elliott Smith and Modest Mouse. Current artists include The Coathangers, L.A. Witch, Nü Sensae, This Will Destroy You, Audacity, Guantanamo Baywatch, White Woods, and Yamantaka // Sonic Titan.

In the spring of 2014, Oregon-based Fort George Brewery and Suicide Squeeze created the craft beer "Suicide Squeeze IPA."

In recent years, Suicide Squeeze has released music by L.A. Witch, Ty Segall, This Will Destroy You, cumgirl8, Minus the Bear, Michael Nau (of Cotton Jones), and The Coathangers.

== History ==
=== Founding, early releases ===
Suicide Squeeze Records was started in August 1996 in Seattle, Washington by owner David Dickenson. After the initial release of a 7" single from Seattle band 764-Hero, the label quickly grew from Dickenson's full-time hobby to a cottage industry by the late-1990s. By 1997 the label had released singles by popular Northwest artists Modest Mouse and Elliott Smith. The label has also released comedy and performance art CD and DVDs, and continues to press a significant number of releases on vinyl.

In an interview with The Stranger, Dickenson said "A highlight of those early days for me was our first 746-HERO release under my belt. Getting to work with David Bazan. And Modest Mouse was a big one. Isaac [Brock, singer/guitarist of Modest Mouse] used to come into Hot Lips, a pizza place that I worked at on the Ave, and he’d be selling these dial-a-song cassettes. He basically was just going to the dumpsters behind the Muzak office, pulling the discarded tapes, making his own artwork, and selling them."

=== 2000–2009 ===
In August 2003, Suicide Squeeze put out a limited-edition vinyl single for "Pretty (Ugly Before)", a song that Elliott Smith had been playing since his Figure 8 tour. Shortly afterwards in 2004, the label released a spoken CD by Eugene Mirman, a Russian-born American comedian and writer. The Absurd Nightclub Comedy of Eugene Mirman was also released on DVD, and was voted one of the Best Albums of 2004 by both The A.V. Club and Time Out New York.

Goon Moon, an American rock band composed of Jeordie White (also known as Twiggy Ramirez from Marilyn Manson) and Chris Goss, released a mini-LP on Suicide Squeeze called I Got a Brand New Egg Layin' Machine in 2005. Chin Up Chin Up was an American indie pop band from Chicago, who released This Harness Can't Ride Anything on October 10, 2006 on Suicide Squeeze. Also in 2006, Canadian rock band Black Mountain released their "Stormy High" single and EP on Suicide Squeeze.

In 2006, to celebrate their tenth anniversary, the label released the compilation album Suicide Squeeze Records: Slaying Since 1996.

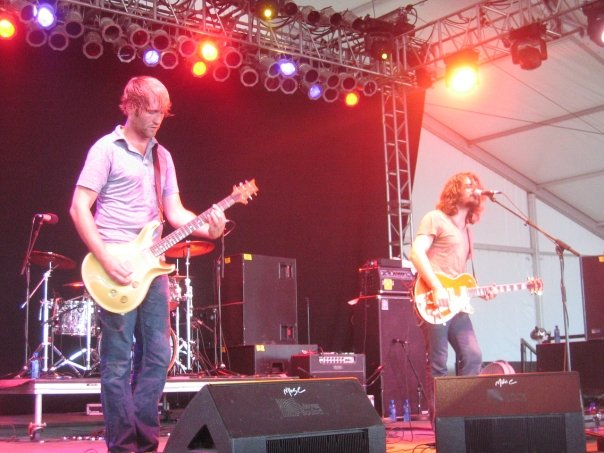
Minus the Bear performing in 2008, shortly after the release of their full-length Planet of Ice on Suicide Squeeze

Minus the Bear is an indie rock band from Seattle, whose sound has been described as "Pele-esque guitar-taps and electronics with sophisticated time signature composition." Interpretaciones del Oso, an album of remixed songs from their second full-length album Menos el Oso, was released on February 20, 2007 through Suicide Squeeze, who also released the band's third full-length album, titled Planet of Ice, on August 21, 2007. In 2017, Minus the Bear released their sixth-studio album VOIDS on Suicide Squeeze.

Page France was an American indie folk-pop music band that played melodic and emotional music. Their last record deal was with Suicide Squeeze, before the disbandment in 2008. Their second album, Hello, Dear Wind, was re-released by Suicide Squeeze. Page France's last album and third full-length, …and the Family Telephone, was released May 8, 2007 on Suicide Squeeze.

For their third studio album, These Arms Are Snakes signed to Suicide Squeeze. Tail Swallower and Dove was released in October 2008. The album was seen as a departure from their more hardcore-sounding songs and took a more experimental approach, and also more traditional song structures.

On January 27, 2009, The Cotton Jones Basket Ride released their second LP, and their debut for Suicide Squeeze Records, Paranoid Cocoon. It was described as a "weepy, reverb-drenched blend of Pacific Northwest, 1960s folk-pop, and heartland rock." On August 24, 2010, the band released their third LP, Tall Hours in the Glowstream. It was described as "classic country music filtered through a dream-pop haze."

=== 2009–present ===
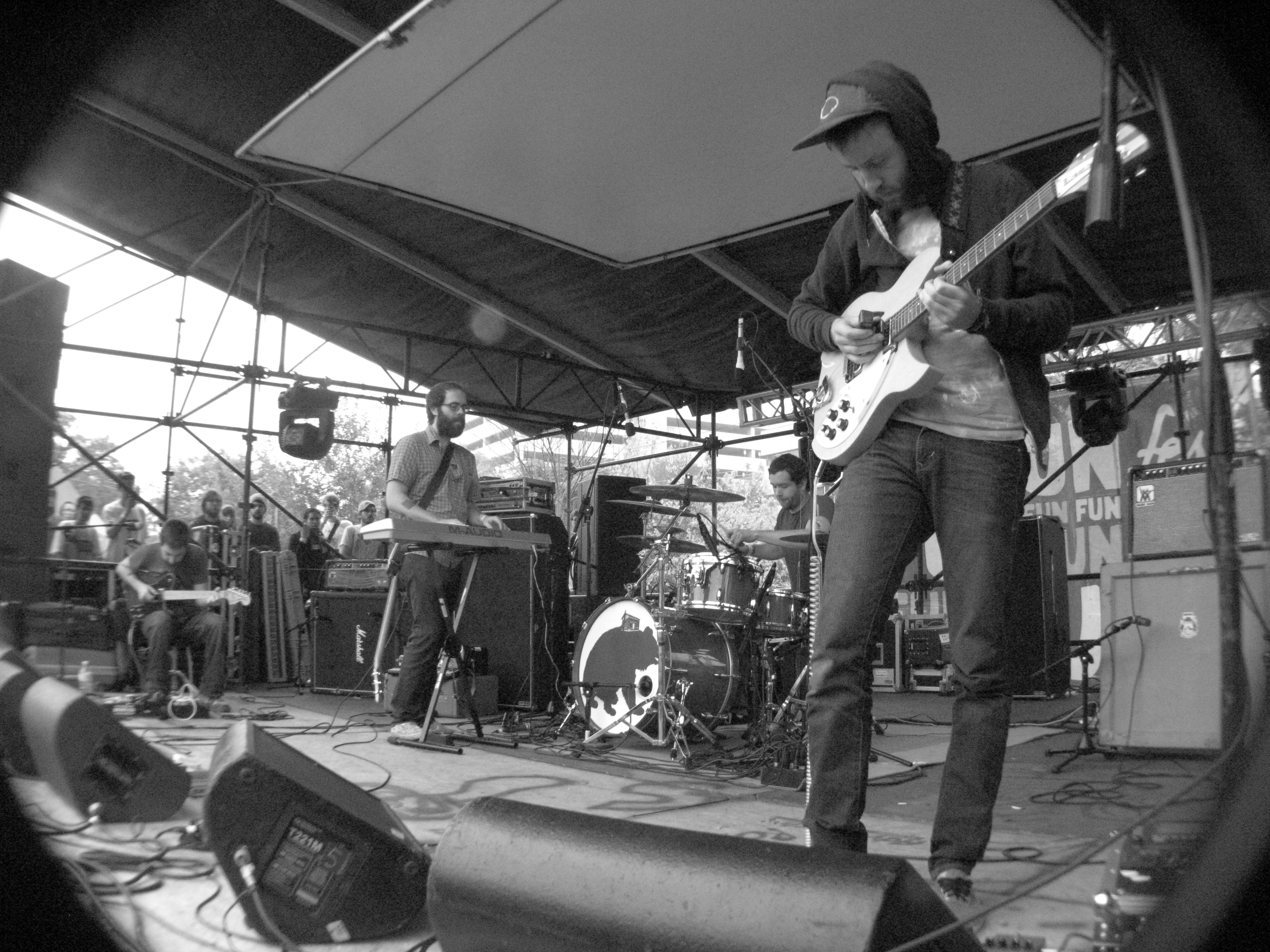
This Will Destroy You in 2009, shortly before their signing to the label

This Will Destroy You released the albums Tunnel Blanket on Suicide Squeeze, as well as the "Black Dunes" 7" single. Tunnel Blanket was released in May 2011, and it entered the Billboard Heatseekers Album Chart at number 25.

The Coathangers in 2017

The Coathangers are a punk group from Atlanta, Georgia. After putting out a 7" on Suicide Squeeze in 2011, they released their third album, Larceny and Old Lace for Suicide Squeeze, to generally positive reviews. In 2012, Julia Kugel of The Coathangers released a 7" record on Suicide Squeeze, under the name "White Woods.". Other releases by The Coathangers on Suicide Squeeze include Suck My Shirt (2014), Nosebleed Weekend (2016), Perfume/Watch Your Back 7" (2016), Parasite EP (2017).

Nü Sensae is a Vancouver, British Columbia, punk and grunge trio. Their second album, "Sundowning", was released on August 7, 2012 via Suicide Squeeze and was given an 8.0 rating by Pitchfork Media.

UZU by performing art collective Yamantaka // Sonic Titan was released on Suicide Squeeze in 2013.

In 2015, Suicide Squeeze released Portland-based punk trio Guantanamo Baywatch's third studio album Darling...It's Too Late.

In 2016, Suicide Squeeze celebrated its 20th anniversary by releasing a digital compilation Suicide Squeeze: 20 Years including Elliott Smith, Minus the Bear, La Luz, King Tuff and more.

In 2017, Suicide Squeeze released music by Ty Segall, This Will Destroy You, Minus the Bear, Michael Nau (of Cotton Jones), and The Coathangers. The label also signed Los Angeles-based trio L.A. Witch for the release of their debut album out September 8, 2017.

== Partnerships ==
In the spring of 2014, the label worked with Oregon-based Fort George Brewery to create the craft beer "Suicide Squeeze IPA."

== Artists ==
=== Current ===
- Audacity
- Chastity Belt
- Childbirth (band)
- The Coathangers
- Coral Grief
- David Bazan
- Death Valley Girls
- Guantanamo Baywatch
- Holy Wave
- L.A. Witch
- Minus the Bear
- Michael Nau
- Nü Sensae
- The Paranoyds
- SadGirl
- Shana Cleveland & The Sandcastles
- Sun Breaks
- This Will Destroy You
- Ty Segall
- VHS
- White Woods
- Yamantaka // Sonic Titan

=== Past ===
- 764-HERO
- The Aislers Set
- Antwon
- Aspera
- Julianna Barwick
- The Black Heart Procession
- The Black Keys
- Black Moth Super Rainbow
- Black Mountain
- Bleached
- Alison Chesley
- Chin Up Chin Up
- The Constantines
- Cotton Jones
- Crystal Skulls
- Davilla 666
- Destruction Unit
- Dirty Beaches
- Earlimart
- Gap Dream
- Heavy Cream
- Page France
- Goon Moon
- Headphones
- HEALTH
- Hella
- Zach Hill
- Hint Hint
- Holy Other
- Human Highway
- Iron & Wine
- JEFF the Brotherhood
- King Tuff
- La Luz
- Lil B
- The Magic Magicians
- Meat Market
- Metal Hearts
- Melvins
- Memoryhouse
- Eugene Mirman
- Modest Mouse
- Natural Child
- Nobunny
- The Numerators
- Of Montreal
- Past Lives
- Peace
- Pedro the Lion
- Pennsy's Electric Workhorses Songs
- Red Stars Theory
- Russian Circles
- Shannon and the Clams
- S
- sBACH
- The Scenic Vermont
- School of Seven Bells
- The Six Parts Seven
- Elliott Smith
- Tammar
- These Arms are Snakes
- Track Star
- The Unicorns
- Upchuck
- Wax Idols
- We Ragazzi

== Discography ==
Incomplete list of releases by Suicide Squeeze Records
Yr	Cat	Release title	Primary artist(s)	Format
1996	S-001	Now You’re Swimming	764-HERO	7"
1996	S-002	The Epilogue Fits B/W l.g.a	The Scenic Vermont	7" single
1996	S-003	A Life of Arctic Sounds	Modest Mouse	7" single
1997	S-004	Worse Further South	The Scenic Vermont	12" EP
1997	S-005	Division Day	Elliott Smith	7"/CD single
1998	S-007	Removable Parts	Track Star	7"
1998	S-008	Whenever You See Fit	Modest Mouse/ 764-HERO	7"
2000	S-011	Progress	Pedro the Lion	CDEP /7"
2000	S-012	Naima	Red Stars Theory	7"
2000	S-015	Attraction Action Reaction	The Aislers Set	7"
2001	S-016	Between the Machines	The Black Heart Procession	7"
2001	S-017	This Is What I Know About Being Gigantic	Minus the Bear	CDEP
2002	S-018	Things Shaped in Passing	The Six Parts Seven	CD
2002	S-019	Bird's Fly	Aspera	CDEP
2002	S-020	The Modern Sinner Nervous Man EP	The Constantines	CDEP
2002	S-021	Highly Refined Pirates	Minus the Bear	CD
2002	S-023	Bands Like It When You Yell "Yar!" at Them	Minus the Bear	CD/EP
2003	S-026	Bitches Ain't Shit but Good People	Hella	CDEP
2003	S-027	S/T	The Magic Magicians	CD
2003	S-028	Pretty (Ugly Before)	Elliott Smith	7" single
2003	S-029	The Six Parts Seven/The Black Keys EP	The Six Parts Seven / The Black Keys	CDEP
2004	S-031	The Devil Isn't Red	Hella	LP
2003	S-032	Revolve	Melvins	7"
2004	S-037	The Unicorns: 2014	The Unicorns	CDEP
2004	S-039	Puking and Crying	S	CD
2004	S-040	Everywhere, and Right Here	The Six Parts Seven	CD
2004	S-041	Masculine Drugs	Zach Hill and Holy Smokes	CD/Book
2004	S-042	The Absurd Nightclub Comedy of…	Eugene Mirman	CD/DVD
2005	S-043	Blocked Numbers	Crystal Skulls	CD
2005	S-044	Church Gone Wild/Chirpin Hard	Hella	CD
2005	S-045	Headphones	Headphones	CD/LP
2005	S-046	I Got a Brand New Egg Layin' Machine	Goon Moon	CD/LP
2005	S-047	Menos El Oso	Minus the Bear	CD/LP
2006	S-050	Slaying Since 1996	Various	CD
2006	S-052	Casually Smashed to Pieces	The Six Parts Seven	CD/LP
2006	S-053	Voltaic Crusher/Undrum to Muted Da	Of Montreal	7" single
2006	S-055	Stormy High	Black Mountain	7" single
2006	S-056	Answers and Questions	Earlimart	7" single
2006	S-057	This Harness Can't Ride Anything	Chin Up Chin Up	CD
2006	S-058	Upper Ninety	Russian Circles	single
2006	S-059	Hello, Dear Wind	Page France	CD
2007	S-062	Interpretaciones del Oso	Minus the Bear	CD
2007	S-063	…and the Family Telephone	Page France	CD/LP
2007	S-064	Tomato Morning	Page France	CD/EP
2007	S-065	Planet of Ice	Minus the Bear	CD
2008	S-068	Perfect Skin	HEALTH	7" single
2008	S-070	Station	Russian Circles	CD
2008	S-071	Strange Symmetry	Past Lives	CD/LP
2008	S-072	Zodiac Girls	Black Moth Super Rainbow	7"
2008	S-073	Silent Grips	School of Seven Bells	7"
2008	S-075	sBACH	sBACH	CD
2008	S-076	Moody Motorcycle	Human Highway	CD/LP
2008	S-078	Tail Swallower and Dove	These Arms are Snakes	CD/LP
2009	S-079	Paranoid Cocoon	Cotton Jones	CD/LP
2009	S-082	Geneva	Russian Circles	CD
2010	S-085	Tapestry of Webs	Past Lives	CD/LP
2010	S-086	Tall Hours in the Glowstream	Cotton Jones	CD/LP
2010	S-088	Mellow Out b/w Heavy Days	JEFF the Brotherhood	7" single
2010	S-090	Caregiver b/w Heirloom	Memoryhouse	7"
2011	S-093	Tunnel Blanket	This Will Destroy You	CD/2xLP
2011	S-094	La La La La Love You	Nobunny	7"
2014	S-100	Suicide Squeeze Records Presents: Forever Singles	Various Artists	LP
2012	S-101	Wild Desire	King Tuff	7"
2012	S-102	Where Did You Go	White Woods	7"
2012	S-105	One More Try	Iron and Wine	7" single
2012	S-107	Sundowning	Nu Sensae	CD/LP
2013	S-111	Pacing	Julianna Barwick	7" single
2013	S-117	Dying in the Pussy	Antwon	7"
2013	S-124	UZU	Yamantaka // Sonic Titan	LP/digital
2013	S-127	Burn	Eating Out	7" single
2014	S-128	Suck My Shirt	The Coathangers	CD/LP/Digital
2014	S-129	Mama b/w Love Kin	Shannon and the Clams / Guantanamo Baywatch	7" single
2014	S-130	Fort George EP	Various Artists	7"
2015	S-137	Darling...It's Too Late	Guantanamo Baywatch	CD/LP/Digital
2015	S-138	Oh Man, Cover the Ground	Shana Cleveland & The Sandcastles	CD/LP/Digital
2015	S-139	Freedom Fries	Black Lips/The Coathangers	7"/Digital
2015	S-140	Women's Rights	Childbirth	LP/CD/Digital
2016	S-078	Tail, Swallower and Dove	These Arms Are Snakes	LP/Digital (Reissue)
2016	S-150	Wild Desire	King Tuff	7"/Digital
2016	S-150	Nosebleed Weekend	The Coathangers	LP/CD/Digital
2016	S-011	Progress	Pedro the Lion	7"/Digital (Reissue)
2016	S-141	Mowing	Michael Nau	CD/LP/Digital
2016	S-142	Hyper Vessels	Audacity	CD/LP/Digital
2016	S-144	Shytown	Elliott Smith/Pete Krebs	7"/Digital
2016	S-145	Gift of Life	VHS	CD/LP/Digital
2017	S-146 - 7"	The Puritan (Julianna Barwick Remix)	This Will Destroy You	EP/Digital
2017	S-148 - 7"	Sentimental Goblin	Ty Segall	EP/Digital
2016	S-149	Dark Sacred Night	David Bazan	LP/Digital
2016	S-150	Christmas Bonus	David Bazan	LP/Digital
2017	S-152	VOIDS	Minus the Bear	CD/LP/Digital
2017	S-153	Some Twist	Michael Nau	CD/LP/Digital
2017	S-156	Parasite	The Coathangers	EP/Digital

== See also ==
- List of record labels
