= Upper Ninety =

Single by Russian Circles
- A-side: "Upper Ninety"
- B-side: "Re-Enter"
- Released: July 25, 2006
- Genre: Post-rock, post-metal, instrumental rock
- Length: 8:36
- Label: Suicide Squeze

Russian Circles singles chronology
"Enter" (2006)	"Upper Ninety" (2006)	"Station" (2008)

"Upper Ninety" is a single by American post-metal band Russian Circles, released on Suicide Squeeze Records. The single was limited to only 2,000 copies. "Upper Ninety" is also featured on Suicide Squeeze's compilation album Slaying Since 1996.

== Track listing ==
No.	Title	Length
1.	"Upper Ninety"	5:18
2.	"Re-Enter"	3:16
