= Heirloom (disambiguation) =

Heirloom(s) may refer to:

- Heirloom, an item passed down through generations
- Heirloom plant, a cultivar grown during earlier periods of human history
  - Heirloom tomato, an heirloom cultivar of tomato
- "Heirloom", a song from the album Before the Calm by Witness, 1999
- "Heirloom", a song from the album Vespertine by Björk, 2001
- "Heirloom", a song from the EP All Delighted People by Sufjan Stevens, 2010
- "Heirloom", a song from the album Clouds by Apollo Brown, 2011
- "Heirloom", a song from the album The Slideshow Effect by Memoryhouse, 2012
- "Heirloom", a song from the album The End, So Far by Slipknot, 2022
- "Heirlooms", a song from the album Älskar by Nina Nesbitt, 2022
- The Heirloom Project, a collection of traditional Unix software adapted to modern standards
