= We Should Have Never Lived Like We Were Skyscrapers =

Studio album by Chin Up Chin Up
- Released: October 13, 2004
- Recorded: 2004
- Genre: Indie pop
- Label: Flameshovel

Chin Up Chin Up chronology
Chin Up Chin Up (2002)	We Should Have Never Lived Like We Were Skyscrapers (2004)	This Harness Can't Ride Anything (2006)

Professional ratings
Review scores
Source	Rating
AllMusic	4/5 stars
Pitchfork Media	7.6/10

We Should Have Never Lived Like We Were Skyscrapers is the debut studio album of the indie pop band Chin Up Chin Up. The album, released October 13, 2004, is notable in that before its completion, bassist Chris Saathoff was killed in a hit and run accident.

== Track listing ==
1. "Why is My Sleeping Bag a Ghetto Muppet?" – 2:33
2. "We Should Have Never Lived Like We Were Skyscrapers" – 4:37
3. "Falcons and Vulcans" – 5:30
4. "Virginia, Don't Drown" – 3:52
5. "Collide the Tide" – 3:55
6. "I Hope for Tumbleweeds" – 3:25
7. "The Architect Has a Gun" – 4:17
8. "Get Me Off This Fucking Island" – 3:37
9. "I'll Be Your Avalanche" – 3:41
10. "All My Hammocks are Dying" – 3:25
