= Andino (surname) =

Andino is a surname of Italian and Spanish origin. Some notable people with the surname include:

- Cristóbal de Andino (1480–1543) Spanish renaissance artist
- Alex Andino (born 1982), Honduran footballer
- Erick Andino (born 1989), Honduran footballer
- Kolohe Andino (born 1994), American surfer
- Dino Andino (born 1972), American surfer
- Lauren Andino (born 1986), American artist, skateboarder, and musician
- Marco Antonio Andino (1955–2015), Honduran politician and lawyer
- Mario Antonio Andino (1936–2014), Salvadoran politician and businessman
- Mariela Andino (born 1992), Dominican team handball player
- Paola Andino (born 1998), American actress
- Robert Andino (born 1984), Cuban-American baseball player
- Roberto Andino (born 1956), Puerto Rican boxer
- Tiburcio Carías Andino (1876–1969), President of Honduras (1924, 1933–1949) and military officer
- Guillermo Andino (born 1968), Argentinian journalist
- Paolo Andino, Cuban-American actor
