= Nabeel (band) =

Iraqi-American music group

Nabeel (نبيل) is the name of singer/songwriter Yasir Razak's Iraqi-American independent musical project based in Richmond, Virginia. Nabeel is known for blending indie rock, grunge and shoegaze while paying homage to Iraqi musical traditions, with most of his songs sung in Arabic. In 2025, Nabeel opened for California shoegaze band: LSD and The Search for God in Brooklyn, and performed at MACROCK XXVIII in Harrisonburg, Virginia.

== Backstory ==
Yasir Razak's family moved from Iraq to Virginia in the 1990s where he spent his childhood watching MTV and engaging with the Virginia DIY scene. In college, Razak attended performances at venues such as Crayola House in Harrisonburg, Virginia. In 2018, Razak started a synth-pop musical project with his friend Travis Legg called TV Sunset He would write music for the band on a Casio SA-76 toy keyboard which he received as a gift. TV Sunset allowed Razak to become more comfortable with writing and creating music. Razak met Jake Golibart (lead guitar), Kyle Grim (bass), Danny Gibney (drums/producer) and Dane Ludwig (drums) in Harrisonburg, VA and in 2021 this group created the first Nabeel song: Ras Alsanna (رأس السنة). Nabeel's third EP: ghayoom (غيوم) released in 2025.

== Discography ==
=== Singles/Eps ===
- ras alsanna - (رأس السنة) (2022)
- samaa' baithaI - (سماء بيضاء) (2022)
- lazim alshams - (لازم الشمس) (2023)
- khowly - (خاولي) (2023)
- shams - (شمس) (2023)
- najoom - (نجوم) (2024)
- resala - (رسالة) (2025)
- ghayoom (غيوم) (2025)
