= Atombombpocketknife =

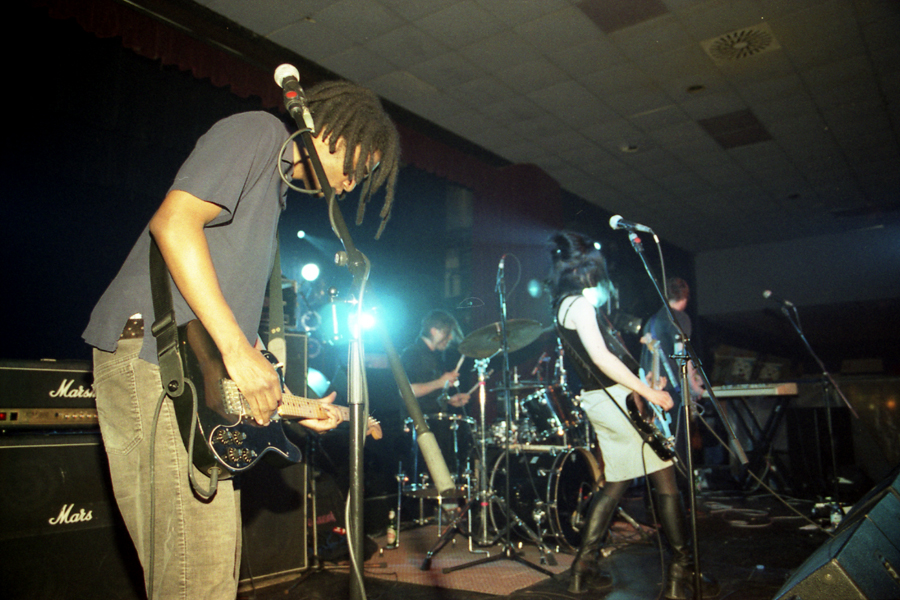
- Atombombpocketknife in concert

Background information
- Origin: Chicago, Illinois
- Genres: Indie rock
- Years active: 1997–2005
- Labels: Southern Records; File 13 Records

Atombombpocketknife was an American indie rock band from Chicago. The band featured Che Arthur on guitar and released three full-length albums between 2000 and 2004.

== History ==
Atombombpocketknife formed in 1997 and toured regionally before releasing a 7" record on File 13 Records and then a 10" on Southern Records in 1999. A full-length, Alpha Sounds, followed on the same label in 2000. Following this the group toured with Man or Astro-Man?, Pinback, and Judah Johnson. A sophomore full-length was issued in 2001, the first on which Che Arthur appeared. Near the end of that same year, drummer Matt Espy (who had joined in 1969) left the group and was replaced by former Sterling drummer Tony Lazzara. Their third and final full-length followed in 2004; the group disbanded in 2005.

== Members ==
- Che Arthur - guitar (2001–2005)
- Allison Hollihan - bass
- Justin Sinkovich - vocals, guitar
- David Burns - drums (1997–1999)
- Matt Espy - drums (1999–2001)
- Tony Lazzara - drums (2001–2005)

== Discography ==
- Fly Vultures Fly 7" (File 13 Records, 1999)
- Atombombpocketknife 10" (Southern Records, 1999)
- Alpha Sounds (Southern, 2000)
- God Save the APBK (Southern, 2001)
- This Is Dance Time EP (Suiteside Records, 2003)
- Lack and Pattern (File 13 Records, 2004)
