= Pear and Sister Pinecone =

Studio album by Page France
- Released: April 18, 2006
- Genre: Indie rock
- Label: Fall Records
- Producer: Page France

Page France chronology
| Hello, Dear Wind (2005) | Pear and Sister Pinecone (2006) | Tomato Morning (2006) |

Pear and Sister Pinecone is a double-EP released on Fall Records by Maryland-based indie folk band Page France.

The label has since announced that no more of the EP set will be produced, resulting in an unintentional limited release of 1,000.

== Track listing ==
=== Pear ===
1. "Million Man Money Hand" - 2:09
2. "All Things, All Right" - 3:39
3. "Talking Out-Louds" - 2:33
4. "Ladder Man" - 3:24
5. "The Saddest Ones" - 2:25
6. "Young One" - 3:10
7. "Everybody Knows" - 4:28
8. "Say Wolf In The Summertime" - 2:58

=== Sister Pinecone ===
1. "Mother" - 3:38
2. "No One Likes a Bleeder" - 2:33
3. "Weatherman, Section One" - 2:20
4. "Weatherman, Section Three" - 2:39
5. "Passengers Laughing" - 2:19
6. "Antarctica (My Beloved Home)" - 3:06
