= Silence Magnifies Sound =

Studio album by The Six Parts Seven
- Released: November 14, 2000
- Genre: Post-rock
- Label: Troubleman Unlimited
- Producer: Chris Keffer

The Six Parts Seven chronology
In Lines and Patterns... (1998)	Silence Magnifies Sound (2000)	Things Shaped in Passing (2002)

Professional ratings
Review scores
Source	Rating
AllMusic	3/5 stars
Pitchfork	6.3/10

Silence Magnifies Sound is a studio album by the Ohio post-rock band the Six Parts Seven. It was released in 2000 on Troubleman Unlimited. It includes the songs "Spaces Between Days (Parts 1 & 2)", with parts 3 and 4 on the following album, Things Shaped in Passing.

== Critical reception ==
Exclaim! wrote that "the playing is solid; guitar work is gorgeous, the drumming is understated and just listening to the viola effortlessly float in induces a complete rush." The Cleveland Scene wrote that "while there is an off-putting pretentiousness about the band, it compares favorably to post-rock such as Mogwai, Tortoise, and Trans Am."

== Track listing ==
1. "In a Late Style of Fire" – 6:18
2. "The Slowest Way of Saying So Little" – 6:01
3. "Spaces Between Days (Part 1)" – 1:23
4. "The Constant Variables" – 4:29
5. "Spaces Between Days (Part 2)" – 1:47
6. "The Day After the Day After Here" – 4:24
7. "One Thing That Won't Matter." - 2:47
8. "Silence Magnifies Sound" - 4:22
9. "Changing the Name of October" - 9:39
