= Sybris =

- Origin: Chicago, Illinois
- Genres: Indie rock
- Years active: 2003–present
- Labels: Flameshovel Records; Absolutely Kosher

Sybris is an American indie rock band from Chicago, Illinois.

== History ==
Sybris formed in 2003 in Chicago. The name is an intentional misspelling of Sybaris, an Ancient Greek city. They signed to Flameshovel Records for the release of their 2005 self-titled debut. A national tour followed the album's release. Their second full-length appeared on Absolutely Kosher in 2008.

In 2009 Sybris's song "Breathe Like You're Dancing" was used in the Movie "According to Greta" starring Hilary Duff.

== Members ==
Current

- Angela Mullenhour - vocals
- Clayton DeMuth - drums
- Phil Naumann - guitar
- Shaun Podgurski - bass, vocals

Former

- Eric Mahle - drums
- Bill Bumgardner - drums

== Discography ==
- Sybris (Flameshovel Records, 2005)
- Into the Trees (Absolutely Kosher, 2008)
