= Benjy Ferree =

American musician

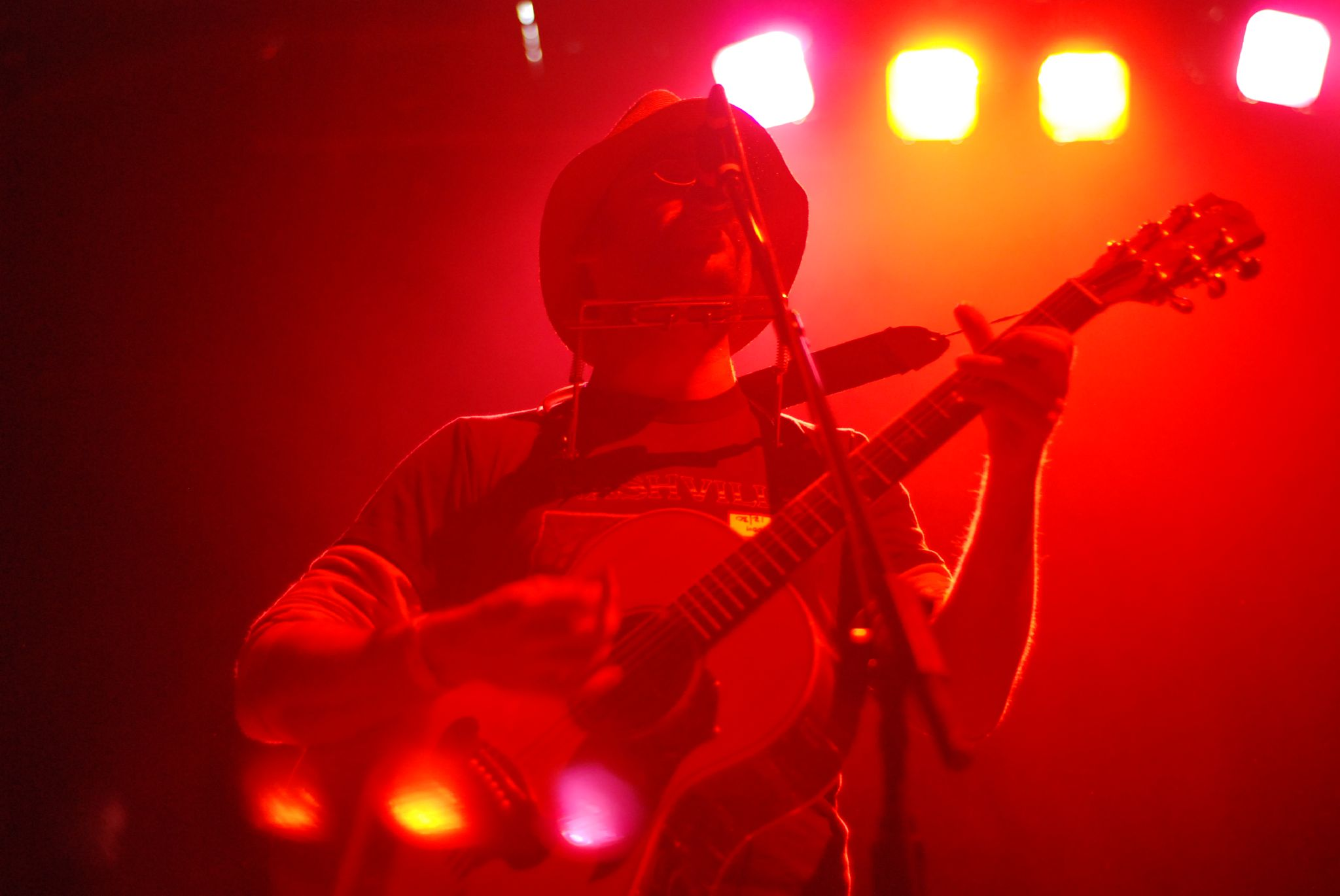

Background information
- Born: Benjamin Scott Ferree; October 4, 1974 (age 51)
- Origin: Prince George's County, Maryland, US
- Genres: American Pop
- Years active: 2005–present
- Label: Domino Records Trick Bag
- Website: www.benjyferree.com

Benjy Ferree is a singer/songwriter from Prince George's County, Maryland. He currently resides in the St. Roch neighborhood of New Orleans, Louisiana.

Following "Leaving the Nest," an EP of six songs released jointly by Box Theory and Planaria Records in October 2005, Ferree signed with Domino Records US/UK. They added four new songs to the original EP and released Ferree's full-length debut album - also entitled Leaving the Nest - in late 2006.

In February 2009, Domino USA released Ferree's 2nd full-length album, "Come Back to the Five and Dime Bobby Dee Bobby Dee." Domino UK released the album worldwide in December 2009.

Live, Ferree plays a Fender Telecaster and KORG SV-1, as well as a Little Phatty, moogerfoogers, Polyevolver, and a moog theremin plus. Sometime touring band member Drew Mills of the Philadelphia band Blood Feathers (formerly of Aspera) has played custom made Wurlitzer drums and guitar. Ferree's live band has also included Laura Harris of The Aquarium (Dischord Records) and Ex-Hex (Merge), Amy Domingues of Garland of Hours, Jonah Takagi of Atelier Takagi, and Little Jack Lawrence

On Oscar Sunday, 2012, Ferree released the G.U.S. 7" on Ricky Records.

== Discography ==
- Leaving the Nest (2006) (LP, CD, MP3) in November in the US, and in January 2007 in Europe
- Come Back to the Five and Dime Bobby Dee Bobby Dee (2009) (CD, MP3) in February in the US, and in December 2009 in Europe
- G.U.S. 7"(2012), (LP, MP3) in February in the US
- Cry-Fi LP(Trick Bag Records)(2016), (LP, MP3) in April 2016 in the US

== Interviews ==
- Interview with Benjy Ferree Aural States (Feb 2009)
- Interview with Benjy Ferree Interview Magazine (January 2009)

== Live sessions ==
- Benjy Ferree on KDHX, St Louis (Performed September 2009)
- Benjy Ferree at the Kennedy Center Millennium Stage (video) (Performed September 2009)
- Benjy Ferree on NPR's World Cafe (Performed April 2009)
- Benjy Ferree on WOXY (Performed February 2009)
- Benjy Ferree "Tiny Desk Concert" video (Performed January 2009)
- Benjy Ferree on Daytrotter (Performed March 2007)
