= The Slideshow Effect =

Studio album by Memoryhouse
- Released: February 28, 2012
- Genre: Dream pop
- Length: 42:48
- Label: Sub Pop
- Producer: Evan Abeele

Memoryhouse chronology
The Years EP (2011)	The Slideshow Effect (2012)	Soft Hate (2016)

The Slideshow Effect is the first full-length album by the Guelph, Ontario-based band Memoryhouse, and their second release on US label Sub Pop. It was released on February 28, 2012.

== Track listing ==
No.	Title	Length
1.	"Little Expressionless Animals"	3:22
2.	"The Kids Were Wrong"	4:12
3.	"All Our Wonder"	4:51
4.	"Punctum"	3:20
5.	"Heirloom"	5:02
6.	"Bonfire"	5:32
7.	"Pale Blue"	3:11
8.	"Walk with Me"	4:43
9.	"Kinds of Light"	4:00
10.	"Old Haunts"	4:35
