= Accompany =

Studio album by Michael Nau
- Released: December 8, 2023
- Genre: Americana
- Length: 45:14
- Label: Karma Chief
- Producer: Michael Nau; Adrian Olsen

Michael Nau chronology
| Demo Versions, 2014 to 2017 (2020) | Accompany (2023) |

Accompany is the fifth solo studio album by American singer-songwriter Michael Nau, released on December 8, 2023, through Karma Chief Records. It received acclaim from critics.

== Background ==
Producer Adrian Olsen contacted Nau to record an album at the former's studio in Richmond, Virginia. Nau then wrote the material and assembled a band to record the album, which was recorded live in the studio.

== Critical reception ==
Professional ratings
Aggregate scores
| Source | Rating |
|---|---|
| Metacritic | 84/100 |
Review scores
| Source | Rating |
| AllMusic | 4/5 stars |
| The Line of Best Fit | 8/10 |
| Uncut | 8/10 |

Accompany received a score of 84 out of 100 on review aggregator Metacritic based on four critics' reviews, indicating "universal acclaim". Uncut called it "classy Americana with a restless pulse and a passionate heart". Glide Magazine's Ryan Dillon wrote that "via vague yet moving poetry, Nau takes a bag of mixed emotions and creates linear narratives lined with gorgeous sentiments set to minimal yet jaw-dropping arrangements".

Marcy Donelson of AllMusic wrote that "although Nau's music has always been known for a reflective, 'dreamy' countenance, Accompany settles into a consistently blurry, midtempo bearing that's particularly lost in thought and memory". Reviewing the album for The Line of Best Fit, Janne Oinonen commented that the album "practically glistens with warmth and depth, with organic yet layered arrangements that combine live-in-the-studio dynamics with carefully calibrated orchestrations (literally in the case of string arrangements that pop up occasionally to enrich the proceedings) attached to some of Nau's most immediately appealing material yet".

== Track listing ==
All tracks are written by Michael Nau.

Accompany track listing
| No. | Title | Length |
|---|---|---|
| 1. | "Sharp Diamonds" | 4:23 |
| 2. | "Painting a Wall" | 3:30 |
| 3. | "Tiny Flakes" | 4:43 |
| 4. | "Shiftshaping" | 3:41 |
| 5. | "And So On" | 3:24 |
| 6. | "One Morning in Vibrato" | 3:27 |
| 7. | "Relearn to Boogie" | 5:35 |
| 8. | "Accompaniment" | 4:54 |
| 9. | "Comes to Pour" | 2:51 |
| 10. | "Long Distance Driver" | 3:46 |
| 11. | "Last I Looked" (bonus track) | 5:00 |
| Total length: | | 45:14 |
