= L.A. Witch =

Garage-rock trio from Los Angeles

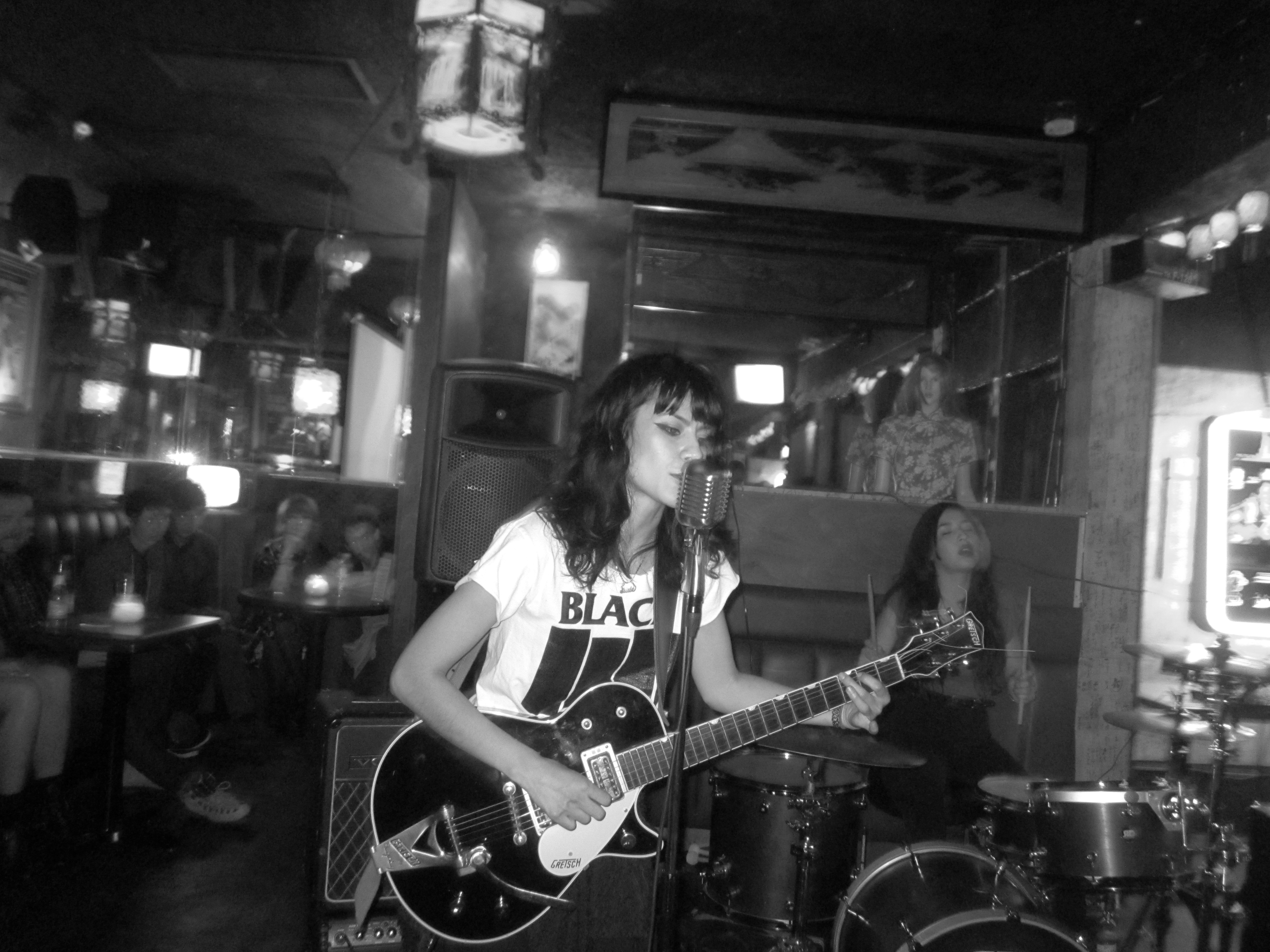
- L.A. Witch performing at Shanghai'd Room in Huntington Beach, California, 2013

Background information
- Origin: Los Angeles, California, United States
- Years active: 2011 - present
- Labels: Suicide Squeeze Records
- Members: Ellie English, Irita Pai, Sade Sanchez
- Past members: Crystal Nava

L.A. Witch is an American garage-rock trio formed in Los Angeles, California in 2011. Founded by L.A. natives Sade Sanchez (vocals, guitar) and Irita Pai (bass), the band's sound has been described as a "mix of forlorn psych folk, lethargic lo-fi blues and boozy garage rock drones steeped in moody, drugged-out surf reverb." The group's influences include Black Sabbath, The Brian Jonestown Massacre, and seminal L.A. punk rock bands X and the Gun Club.

== History ==
=== Formation ===
Sanchez formed the all female group when her then-boyfriend forbade her from playing with male musicians. Asked to come up with a name, the band chose its current name after discovering its first choice, Witch, was taken. Drummer Ellie English replaced original drummer Crystal Nava after the latter left for New York City and didn't return.

=== Influences ===
The band cites The Gun Club as one of its early influences, with Sanchez noting that "When our band first met, that was one of the connections we made. There’s something about their vibe — it’s blues-y, twang-y, kind of country, but also poetic and goth-y — that inspired me."

=== Touring and recording ===
The band toured extensively before releasing its eponymous debut album in 2017, recorded at Hurley Studios in Costa Mesa and mixed in Highland Park, Los Angeles. Their second album, Play With Fire, was released in 2020, followed by a cover of the Gun Club's Ghost on the Highway. Their third album, DOGGOD, was released in 2025. Alta Journal's Lisa Nighthawk said of DOGGOD that it "introduced a goth new-wave edge into the band’s sound: think Hole meets Joy Division, candlelight casting shadows on nine songs with lyrics exploring the razor’s edge between devotion and debasement."

The band tours frequently in the U.S. and internationally. Joining the band on its 2022 European tour was guitarist Lauren Andino of the Los Angeles-based duo Tremours.

== Discography ==
=== Albums ===
- 2017 - L.A. Witch
- 2020 - Play With Fire
- 2025 - DOGGOD

=== Singles ===
- 2012 - Your Ways
- 2013 - L.A. Witch
- 2015 - Kill My Baby Tonight
- 2015 - Drive Your Car
- 2016 - Brian
- 2017 - Drive Your Car
- 2017 - Untitled
- 2018 - Octubre
- 2020 - Gen-Z
- 2021 - One Way or the Highway
