= Chin Up Chin Up (album) =

Studio album by Chin Up Chin Up
- Released: 2002
- Genre: Indie pop

Chin Up Chin Up chronology
Chin Up Chin Up (2002)	We Should Have Never Lived Like We Were Skyscrapers (2004)

Chin Up Chin Up is an album by American indie pop band Chin Up Chin Up and was released in 2002. It was re-released with bonus tracks in 2005.

== Track listing ==
1. Collide The Tide [4:17]
2. Fuck You, Elton John [3:32]
3. For All The Tanning Salons In Texas [4:02]
4. The Soccer Mom Gets Her Fix [3:29]
5. I'm Not Asking For A Tennis Bracelet [4:13]
6. Pillage The Village [4:07]
7. We Should Have Never Lived Like We Were Skyscrapers (Stephen Snydacker Mix) [2:56]
8. Falconz And Vulcanz (Acoustic) [4:16]
9. The Architect Has A Gun (Ronald Simmons/Gene McDonald Mix) [3:31]
