= Lying in States =

- Origin: Chicago, Illinois, United States
- Genres: Indie rock
- Years active: 1999–2006
- Labels: Flameshovel Records

Lying in States were an American indie rock band from Chicago, Illinois.

== History ==
The group was founded in 1999, and began by touring the United States with groups such as Rainer Maria, Hot Hot Heat, Rye Coalition, and Denali. After releasing an EP in 2002, the group recorded its initial full-length at Semaphore Studios in Chicago, which was released on Flameshovel Records in January 2004. A follow-up LP was released in March 2006 and was accompanied by another US tour.

== Members ==
- Justin Trombly – bass
- Fergus Kaiser – guitar
- Ben Clarke – guitar and vocals
- Mark Benson – drums
- Jeremy Ohmes – keyboards

== Discography ==
- Bewildered Herd EP (Harmless Records, 2002)
- Most Every Night (Flameshovel Records, 2004)
- Wildfire on the Lake (Flameshovel Records, 2006)
