= DL Skateboards =

- Industry: Skateboard manufacturer
- Founded: 2011; 15 years ago
- Founders: Derek Mabra, Lauren Andino
- Headquarters: Topanga Canyon, California, United States

DL Skateboards is a skateboard company based in Topanga Canyon, California, United States. Founded in 2011 by artist–skateboarder couple Derek Mabra and Lauren Andino, their original skateboards were created in their Brooklyn, New York, apartment.

Mabra, a former woodworker, would shape the skateboard, while Andino does the painting. The artwork is inspired by the California surf scene of the 1960s, showcasing minimal designs.

In 2014, The Daily Beast called the skateboards "cult favorites".
