= Enter (Russian Circles album) =

Studio album by Russian Circles
- Released: May 16, 2006
- Recorded: December 30, 2005 – January 8, 2006 at Electrical Audio and Studio Greg Studios II in Chicago, Illinois
- Genre: Post-rock, post-metal, instrumental rock
- Length: 44:16
- Label: Flameshovel Records; Sargent House
- Producer: Greg Norman

Russian Circles chronology
Russian Circles (2004)	Enter (2006)	Station (2008)

Professional ratings
Review scores
Source	Rating
AllMusic	3.5/5 stars
Drowned in Sound	9/10
Pitchfork Media	(6.4/10)

Enter is the debut studio album by American post-metal band Russian Circles. It was released on Flameshovel Records on May 16, 2006. The band's use of fade off at the end of each song allows the album to flow continuously. All tracks first appeared on their self-titled EP, with the exception of "Micah" and "Enter."

== Track listing ==
No.	Title	Length
1.	"Carpe"	9:01
2.	"Micah"	8:03
3.	"Death Rides a Horse"	5:46
4.	"Enter"	7:54
5.	"You Already Did"	8:14
6.	"New Macabre"	5:18

== Personnel ==
- Mike Sullivan − guitar
- Colin Dekuiper − bass
- Dave Turncrantz − drums
- Greg Norman − engineering
- Dan Stout − mastering
- Rob Lowe − piano, mellotron, listening and instrument lending
- Jonathan Krohn − album design
