= Bound Stems =

American indie rock band

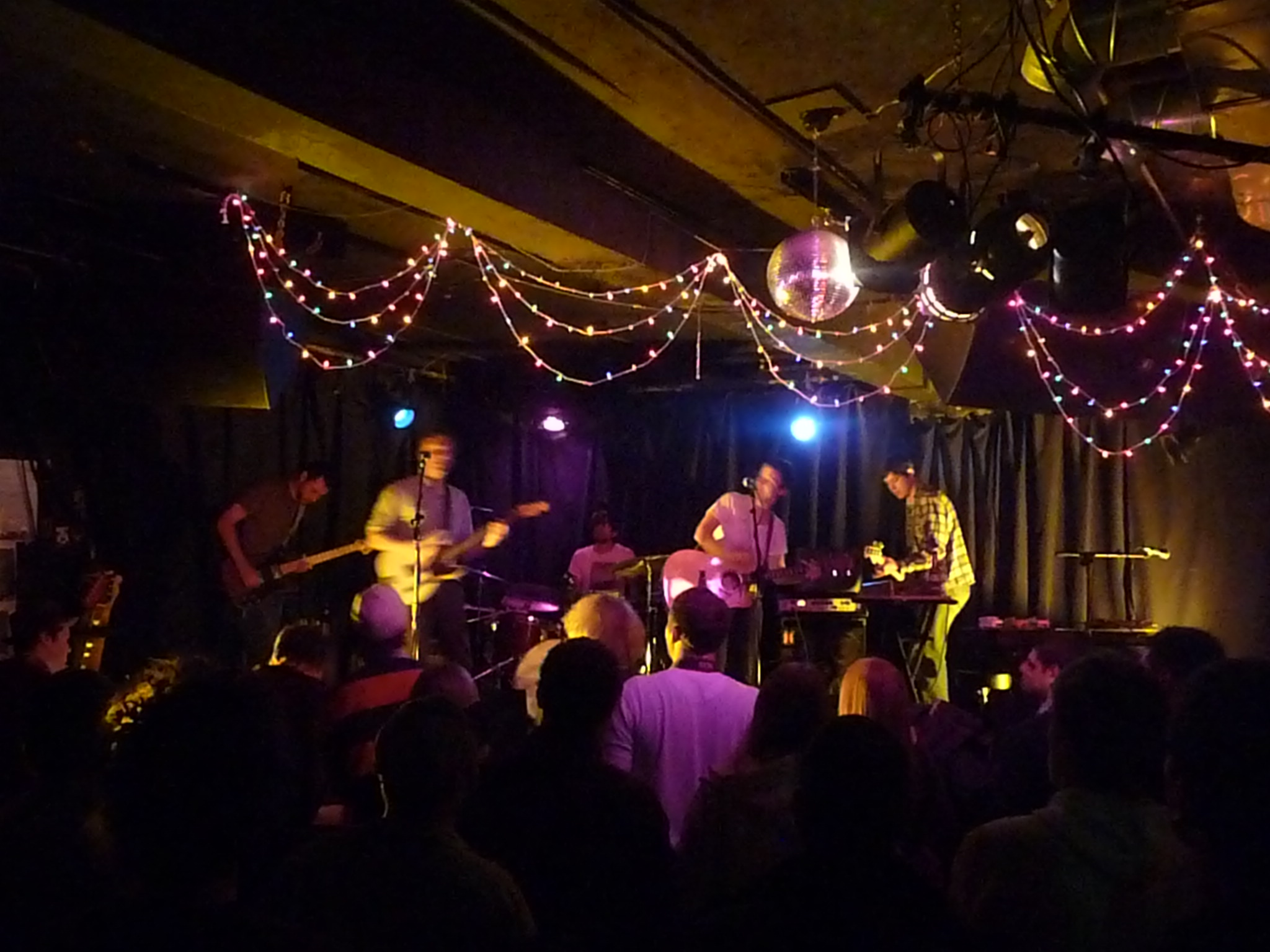
- Bound Stems in 2008.

Background information
- Origin: Chicago, Illinois, United States
- Genres: Indie rock
- Years active: 2002–2008
- Label: Flameshovel Records
- Members: Robert Gallivan; Dan Fleury; Dan Radzicki; Evan Sult; Janie Porche
- Website: boundstems.com

Bound Stems was an indie rock band with math rock influences from Chicago, Illinois. The band's members were Robert Gallivan (vocals), Dan Fleury (guitar), Dan Radzicki (bass, keys), Evan Sult (drums, ex-Harvey Danger), and Janie Porche (multi-instrumentalist).

== Band history ==
Fleury, Radzicki, and Gallivan met while attending high school in Lisle, IL. The three wrote and recorded music during these years and continued to do so during college. It wasn't until the September 2002 arrival of Harvey Danger alum Evan Sult, who answered a drummer-wanted ad, that Bound Stems officially formed. They began writing and performing around Chicago more frequently. Janie Porche completed her transition from friend, to roommate, to band member during the recording of their Logic EP in 2005.

The Logic of Building the Body Plan EP, released in 2005, is the first work that all five members wrote together from beginning to end. After extensive touring, writing, and recording the band completed and released Appreciation Night to warm reviews in 2006.

During the summer of 2007, Bound Stems played shows across the country, including the Lollapalooza festival in Chicago.

The group began recording their second full-length album for Flameshovel Records during the fall of 2007. The album, titled The Family Afloat, was released July 11, 2008 on vinyl and September 9, 2008 on CD.

After the release and tour supporting The Family Afloat the band separated. In March 2010 a new project Like Pioneers was announced which included Robert, Dan, Dan, and Janie of Bound Stems, with the addition of Jesse Woghin of The Narrator and Chicago multiinstrumentalist Darren Garvey. Drummer Evan Sult relocated to St Louis to continue the Sleepy Kitty project with partner Paige Brubeck.

== Honors ==
- Bound Stems were SPIN's Artist of the Day, December 2005.
- Bound Stems were SPIN's Band of the Month, March 2006.
- Bound Stems were the featured band on Daytrotter in September 2006.

== Discography ==
- Change Comes at 14 and a Half EP (2003)
- Caught It on the Continent EP (2003)
- Levity EP (2004)
- The Logic of Building the Body Plan EP (2005) - Flameshovel Records
- Appreciation Night LP (2006) - Flameshovel Records
- The Family Afloat LP (2008) - Flameshovel Records
