= Ghayoom =

Ghayoom - غيوم

EP by Nabeel
- Released: July 24, 2025
- Genre: Shoegaze; slowcore
- Length: 24:18
- Label: Self released
- Producer: Yasir Nabeel Razak; Danny Gibney

Nabeel chronology
resala (2025)	Ghayoom - غيوم (2025)

Ghayoom (stylized in all lowercase) is the third EP (Note: Despite appearing as an album on streaming services, Nabeel describes the project as an EP.) by Iraqi-American musical project Nabeel. The title, written as "غيوم" in Arabic, translates to "clouds" in English. The album was self released on July 24, 2025. The project received acclaim from critics, appearing on lists for the best music of 2025.

== Track listing ==
All tracks are written by Yasir Nabeel Razak.

No.	Title	Length
1.	"resala (Note: Translates to "letter" in english) - رسالة"	3:33
2.	"yalma (Note: Translates to "shine" in english) - يلمع"	5:08
3.	"khatil (Note: Translates to "hiding" in english) - خاتل"	3:24
4.	"wasal (Note: Translates to "got it" in english) - واصل"	2:53
5.	"dayr bali (Note: Translates to "i'm thinking about it" in english) - داير بالي"	2:00
6.	"ghayoom (Note: Translates to "clouds" in english) - غيوم"	3:42
7.	"noor (Note: Translates to "light" in english) - نور"	2:22
8.	"qahar (Note: Translates to "conquer" in english) - قهر"	1:16
Total length:		24:18

== Personnel ==
Credits adapted from Tidal.

Musicians

- Yasir Nabeel Razak – lead vocals (all tracks), composer (all tracks)
- Kyle Grim – bass guitar (all tracks), composer (7)
- Danny Gibney – drums (all tracks), composer (7)
- Jake Golibart - electric guitar (all tracks), composer (7)
- Danny Gibney - composer (8)

Technical

- Yasir Nabeel Razak – production (all tracks)
- Danny Gibney – production (all tracks)

== Reception ==
The album appeared on Stereogum's list for "The Top 10 Shoegaze Albums Of 2025" describing the project as Nabeel's best work to date. It was listed as one of the best albums of 2025 by the Muslim culture outlet Hyphen. A profile of Nabeel in Rolling Stone likened the project to the music of Pearl Jam and Duster.
