= Low Skies =

- Origin: Chicago, Illinois
- Genres: Indie rock, slowcore, alternative country
- Years active: 2000–present
- Label: Flameshovel Records

Low Skies is an American rock band from Chicago, Illinois.

== History ==
Low Skies formed in 2000 after a chance meeting between Creps and Salveter. After deciding to record together, they played with a number of local musicians before settling on a permanent lineup. After signing with Flameshovel Records in 2002, the group released its debut full-length, The Bed, in 2003. A five-track EP, I Have Been to Beautiful Places, followed in 2004. Their sophomore LP, All the Love I Could Find, was released in 2006. They are currently on hiatus.

== Members ==
- Jason Creps - drums
- Christopher Salveter - vocals, guitar
- Jacob Ross - guitar
- Brandon Ross - bass
- Luther Rochester - keyboards

== Discography ==
- The Bed (Flameshovel Records, 2003)
- I Have Been to Beautiful Places (Flameshovel, 2004)
- All the Love I Could Find (Flameshovel, 2006)
