= Coral Grief =

American dream pop band

Coral Grief is an American dream pop band from Seattle, Washington. The band consists of vocalist Lena Farr-Morrissey, guitarist Sam Fason, and drummer Cam Hancock.

== History ==
The band played their first show ever at the Tractor Tavern in Seattle. The group released their self-titled debut EP in 2021. In 2023, the group released their second EP titled Daydrops. The group released their debut LP Air Between Us, in 2025.

== Discography ==
Studio albums

- Air Between Us (2025, Suicide Squeeze Records)

EPs

- Coral Grief (2021, self-released)
- Daydrops (2023, self-released)
