= Blood Feathers =

US musical group

- Origin: Philadelphia, Pennsylvania, United States
- Genres: Rock and roll, indie rock
- Years active: 2005–present
- Labels: Philebrity, Box Theory
- Members: Ben Dickey; Drew Mills; Clay Simmons; Patrick Marsceill; Sam Murphy; Tracy Stanton
- Past members: Mickey Walker; Quentin Stoltzfus
- Website: http://www.bloodfeathers.com

Blood Feathers are an American rock band from Philadelphia, Pennsylvania. They were formed in 2005 by Ben Dickey and Drew Mills. The current band consists of Dickey (vocals, guitar, piano) and Mills (vocals, guitar), Clay Simmons (bass guitar), Patrick Marsceill (drums), Sam Murphy (guitar), and Tracy Stanton (saxophone, percussion, keyboard).

== Biography ==
Blood Feathers started as a live performance outlet for songwriters Ben Dickey and Drew Mills to showcase new material they had written. Having met through the Philadelphia music scene in the 1990s, by 2005, both Dickey and Mills' bands (Amen Booze Rooster and Aspera, respectively) had broken up. Dickey and Mills started performing new material, folk and soul covers together at local open mic nights under the moniker Dickey Mills.

Eventually having an album's worth of material, the two went into studio with local Philadelphia friends, Mickey Walker and Quentin Stoltzfus (both of the band Mazarin). With the assistance of Philadelphia producer Brian McTear, the group recorded what would become Blood Feathers debut, Curse and Praise. Walker and Stoltzfus performed as the band's rhythm section on the recording and would eventually play in a revolving cast of musicians that comprised the early Blood Feathers live show.

Curse & Praise was released on August 8, 2006 on the Philadelphia-based label, Box Theory Records. Magnet Magazine wrote of the album, "Drew Mill's quavering voice -- with its pinch of Donovan, gram of Marc Bolan and healthy dose of Lawrence -- immediately conjures psychedelic fields and starry skies.". Despite gaining favorable editorial reviews, the album failed to elevate the band into the national spotlight.

In 2007, after failing to garner national support for their debut, Dickey and Mills planned to take time off from their home town of Philadelphia and relocate to Prescott, Arizona.

The guitarist-songwriters decided to regroup, seeking a bigger piece of the sky in Prescott, Arizona, where they planned to hone their songwriting alliance while working at a restaurant owned by their manager, Newt Lynn. Mills never made it due to personal reasons, but Dickey says he spent a beneficial 18 Southwestern months working in the kitchen by day and as a guitarist in a Bob Wills cover band called The Prescott Playboys by night.

"I was 30 years younger than everybody else in the band," Dickey, 32, says with a measure of pride. "The guy I replaced played in Patsy Cline's band. It was great for me as a musician."

Dickey wasn't about to give up on Blood Feathers, however. So the Arkansas native moved back to Fishtown - where he now works as a cook at indie venue/gastropub Johnny Brenda's. He got Blood Feathers back together with Mills, who's originally from Willow Grove and who had taken a job touring with songwriter Benjy Ferree while Dickey was out of town.

Upon Dickey's return from Arizona, Blood Feathers established a full band line up, consisting of Mills and Dickey with the addition of Patrick Marsceill on the drums (formerly of The A-Sides), Tracy Stanton(formerly of Bardo Pond) on the saxophone, percussion, and keyboards, and Sam Murphy on the guitar (an old Arkansas friend of Dickey's who also plays in the Philadelphia band Pink Skull).

On December 8, 2009, Blood Feathers second album, Goodness Gracious, was released digitally on Philebrity Label. Vinyl versions of this album are anticipated to be released in March 2010. Since the album has been available, it has gained national attention by consistent airplay on the nationally syndicated NPR program World Cafe. The first single off Goodness Gracious, "Don't Know You At All" was also featured on an Urban Outfitters musical compilation available from their website and on iTunes.

== Interviews ==
- Philadelphia Inquirer (January 2010)
- Philadelphia Weekly (January 2010)

== Discography ==
- Curse & Praise (2006) (CD, MP3) released August 2006 in the USA on Box Theory Records.
- Goodness Gracious (2009) (LP, CD, MP3) released December 2009 digitally (mp3) in the US, in March 2010 on Vinyl in the USA on Philebrity Label.
