= Memoryhouse =

Canadian musical duo

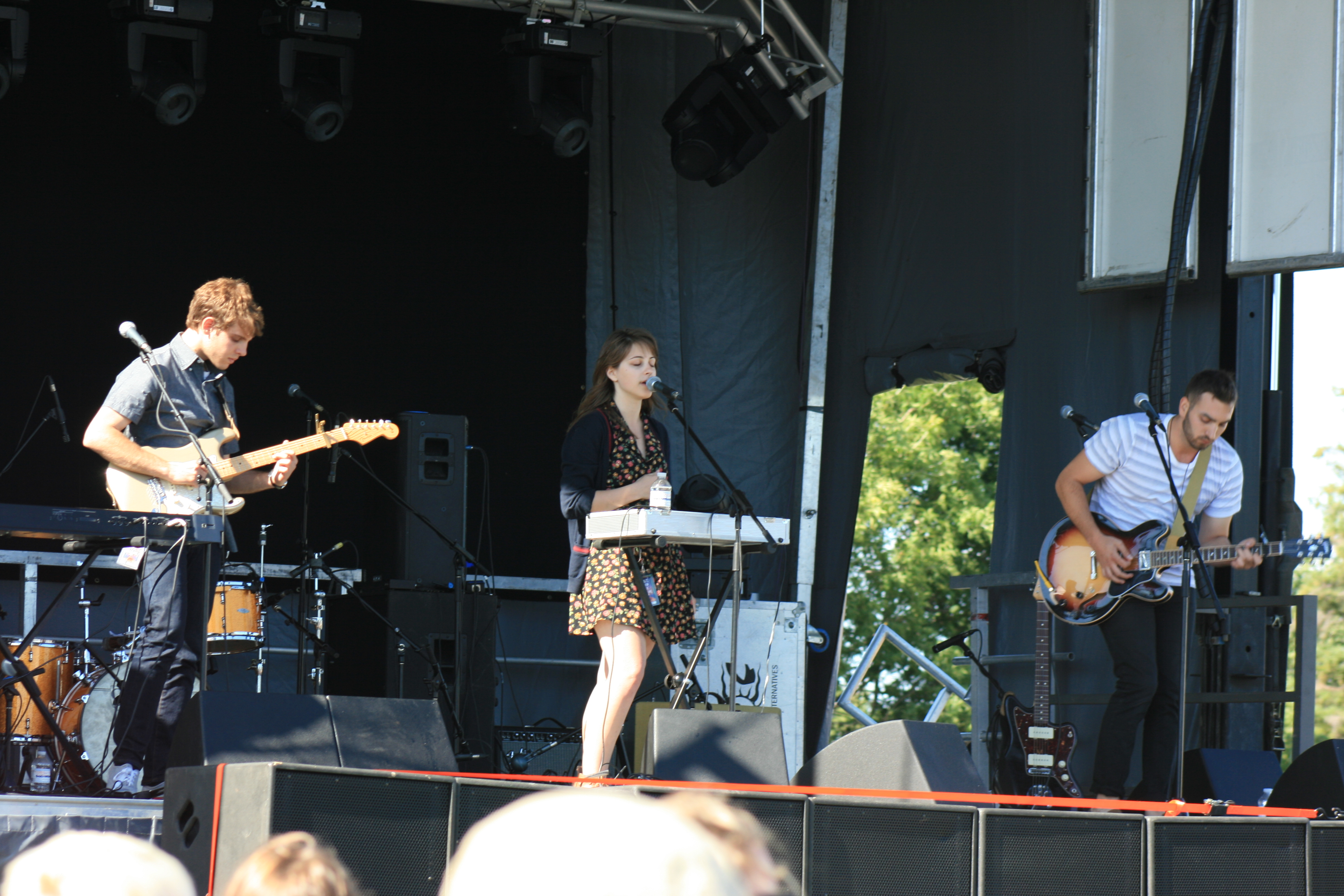
- Memoryhouse, August 2010

Background information
- Origin: Toronto, Ontario, Canada
- Genres: Dream pop, shoegazing
- Years active: 2010–present
- Labels: Inflated; Suicide Squeeze; Sub Pop
- Members: Evan Abeele; Denise Nouvion
- Website: www.memoryhousexo.com

Memoryhouse is a Canadian indie dream pop music group formed in 2009 in Guelph, Ontario. The band was signed to Sub Pop. Memoryhouse consists of Evan Abeele (composer) and Denise Nouvion (vocalist). Their sound has been described as similar to that of Beach House.

== Reception ==
In reviewing the 2010 release of The Years, Pitchfork wrote that "the EP clearly sets Abeele and Nouvion apart from their more amateur peers. The Years may be awash in nostalgia, but far from inviting unfavorable comparisons, it mostly confirms that the past was indeed as good as you remember."

== Discography ==
=== Albums ===
- The Slideshow Effect (February 28, 2012), Sub Pop
- Soft Hate (February 9, 2016), Self Released

=== EPs ===
- The Years (2010), Self-Released
- The Years EP (2011), Sub Pop
- Digital Fire, Digital Burn - Holiday Songs 2010-2015 (December 15, 2015), Self-Released
- Mania (April 6, 2021), Self-Released; consists of Beatles covers

=== Singles ===
- Lately 7" (June 2, 2010), Inflated
- Caregiver 7" (November 9, 2010), Suicide Squeeze
