= LSD and the Search for God =

American shoegaze band

- Origin: San Francisco, California
- Genres: Psychedelic rock; shoegaze
- Years active: 2005–present
- Labels: Mind Expansion; Deep Space Recordings; Don Giovanni Records
- Members: Andy Liszt; Chris Fifield; E. Scarlett Levinson; Sophia Campbell
- Past members: Caleb Rush; Christy England; Daniel Apuzzo; Frank Campbell; Jeff Lee; Lauren Andino; Ryan Lescure; Ricky Maymi; Steve Kennedy; Scott Eberhardt; Sandi Denton; Sonya Trejo; Zaied Ali
- Website: lsdandthesearchforgod.bandcamp.com

LSD and the Search for God is an American shoegaze band formed in San Francisco, California, in 2005.

The band's founding members are singer and guitarist Andy Liszt, singer Sophia Campbell, and guitarist Chris Fifield, with several recurring and past members having been part of the lineup throughout its history. The origin of the group's name is a reference to author William Braden's book The Private Sea: LSD and the Search for God. They gained traction following the release of their debut self-titled EP in 2007 under the record label Mind Expansion. The EP sold out and was reissued on vinyl the following year by Deep Space Recordings. In 2016, they released their only new material since then, an EP titled Heaven is a Place. However, the band remains active and have gained a cult following. Guitarist Andy Liszt uses a Marshall Shredmaster distortion pedal among his equipment. In 2025 the band signed with Don Giovanni Records, bringing their EPs to wide international release.

== Discography ==
=== EPs ===
- LSD and the Search for God (Mind Expansion Records, 2007)
- Heaven Is a Place (Deep Space Recordings, 2016)
