= Cotton Jones =

American indie folk band

- Origin: Cumberland, Maryland, U.S.
- Genres: Indie folk, psychedelic folk, dream pop, chamber pop
- Years active: 2008-present
- Label: Suicide Squeeze Records
- Spinoffs: Michael Nau, Dream Sitch
- Spinoff of: Page France
- Members: Michael Nau; Whitney McGraw; Todd Gowans; Greg Bender
- Past members: Chris Morris; Bryan Martin; Matt Smith

Cotton Jones (formerly The Cotton Jones Basket Ride) is an American indie folk band, with elements of psychedelic folk, dream pop, and chamber pop, based in Cumberland, Maryland and currently signed to Suicide Squeeze Records.

Michael Nau (born October 31, 1984) is the lead singer-songwriter and plays guitar, Whitney McGraw (born July 20, 1986) is on keyboards, organ, and electronic autoharp, Todd Gowans (born February 4, 1986) also plays guitar, with Greg Bender on bass.

== Albums ==
=== The River Strumming ===
On September 23, 2008, the band released their first LP, The River Strumming, through the indie label St. Ives. It was a hand-made package limited to only 300 copies and was described as a "delightful slab of fuzzed-out dream folk." The album was reissued by Suicide Squeeze Records during the summer of 2023 for its 15th anniversary, limited to only 1000 copies, 400 on 180-gram half coke bottle green and half bone, 600 on 180-gram black vinyl. Mark Lager, in a retrospective review on Aquarium Drunkard, described The River Strumming as "a summer night trip through the swamps, a car rambling down lonely backroads...macabre and magical psychedelia, southern gothic style."

=== Paranoid Cocoon ===
On January 27, 2009, the band released their second LP, their debut for Suicide Squeeze Records, Paranoid Cocoon. It was described as a "weepy, reverb-drenched blend of Pacific Northwest, 1960s folk-pop, and heartland rock."

=== Tall Hours in the Glowstream ===
On August 24, 2010, the band released their third LP, Tall Hours in the Glowstream. It was described as "classic country music filtered through a dream-pop haze."

=== About the Game ===
On August 21, 2012, the band released About the Game, a 7" record limited to only 500 copies.

=== Mowing ===
On November 18, 2015, Michael Nau announced his solo debut Mowing, introducing the first single "Winter Beat" via SoundCloud. The album's release date was February 19, 2016.

=== Some Twist ===
On June 16, 2017, Michael Nau released his second solo album Some Twist. AllMusic described it as a "high-humidity set for long summer days, present or imagined" and Red & Black described it as "outer space road trip music...songs that feel unreal in their otherworldliness."

=== Accompany ===
On December 8, 2023, Michael Nau released his fifth solo album Accompany. Glide Magazine called the album "Nau’s best solo effort to date."

== Band members ==
=== Current members ===
- Michael Nau
- Whitney McGraw
- Todd Gowans
- Greg Bender

=== Touring members ===
- Chris Morris
- Bryan Martin
- Matt Smith

== Discography ==
List of releases by Cotton Jones
Year	Title	Label
2007	The Cotton Jones Basket Ride EP	Quite Scientific Records
2008	The Archery EP	Quite Scientific Records
2008	The River Strumming	St. Ives Records
2009	Paranoid Cocoon	Suicide Squeeze Records
2009	Rio Ranger EP	Quite Scientific Records
2010	Tall Hours in the Glowstream	Suicide Squeeze Records
2011	Sit Beside Your Vegetables EP	Suicide Squeeze Records
2012	About the Game 7"	Porchlight Records

List of releases by Michael Nau
Year	Title	Label
2016	Mowing	Suicide Squeeze Records
2017	Some Twist	Suicide Squeeze Records
2018	Michael Nau & the Mighty Thread	Light in the Attic Records
2019	Less Ready to Go	1487217 Records
2023	Accompany	Karma Chief Records
