= Judah Johnson =

- Origin: Detroit, Michigan
- Genres: Indie rock
- Years active: 1999–present
- Label: Flameshovel Records

Judah Johnson is an American rock band from Detroit, Michigan.

== History ==
Judah Johnson formed in 1999 and first began recording in the summer of 2000 with Don Dixon. After touring regionally, they released their debut EP on Flameshovel Records in 2001. Following a series of lineup changes in early 2002, the band began recording material for a full-length in the summer of that year. The LP Kisses and Interrogation was released in 2003, and in 2006 a follow-up full-length, Be Where I Be, was issued. That same year, the band performed at North East Sticks Together.

== Members ==
Current

- Daniel Johnson - vocals, guitar
- Charlie Koltak - drums
- Steven Nistor - keyboards
- Rodrigo Palma - bass

Former

- Brian Pierson - guitar (1999–2002)
- Zach Roberts - bass (1999–2002)
- Nate Cavalieri - keyboards (1999–2002)

== Discography ==
- Judah Johnson EP (Flameshovel Records, 2001)
- Kisses and Interrogation (Flameshovel, 2003)
- Be Where I Be (Flameshovel, 2006)
