= Che Arthur =

American musician

Che Arthur is an American singer, songwriter, multi-instrumentalist, and an engineer/tour manager. He is based in Chicago, Illinois.

== Background ==
Born in Mobile, Alabama, Arthur played guitar, keyboards, bass, and drums in numerous Southern U.S. touring rock bands. In the mid 1990s he moved to Chicago, where he played guitar in the band Universal Life and Accident, in which he was the singer and principal songwriter, and later in Atombombpocketknife.

== Musical career ==
- Universal Life and Accident
- Atombombpocketknife (1997–2005)
- Pink Avalanche (since 2012)

== Discography ==
=== Atombombpocketknife ===
- God Save the ABPK (2001)
- Lack and Pattern (2004)

=== Solo albums ===
- For That Which Now Lies Fallow (2024)
- All Of Your Tomorrows Were Decided Today (2004)
- Iron (2007)
- Like Revenge (2009)
