= Hello, Dear Wind =

Studio album by Page France
- Released: October 18, 2005
- Recorded: March–May, 2005 at The Apple Union
- Genre: Indie rock
- Length: 45:30
- Label: Fall Records; Suicide Squeeze
- Producer: Page France

Page France chronology
Come, I'm A Lion (2004)	Hello, Dear Wind (2005)	Pear and Sister Pinecone (2006)

Professional ratings
Review scores
Source	Rating
Allmusic	3.5/5 stars
Pitchfork Media	(7.8/10)

Hello, Dear Wind is the second album by Maryland indie-folk band Page France. It was released in 2005 on Fall Records, then re-released on September 12, 2006 on Suicide Squeeze.

The opening track, "Chariot," was featured on Episode 12 of the third season of Weeds, "The Dark Time"; "Jesus" in Episode 6 of the same season.

== Track listing ==
1. Chariot - 3:39
2. Jesus - 3:30
3. Dogs - 3:35
4. Elephant - 3:03
5. Junkyard - 2:47
6. Bush - 2:46
7. Windy - 3:53
8. Grass - 1:53
9. Glue - 3:45
10. Up - 2:13
11. Finders - 1:38
12. Trampoline - 3:26
13. Goodness - 2:52
14. Feather - 6:34
