= Things Shaped in Passing =

Studio album by The Six Parts Seven
- Released: March 19, 2002
- Genre: Post-rock
- Length: 41:45
- Label: Suicide Squeeze
- Producer: Chris Keffer

The Six Parts Seven chronology
Silence Magnifies Sound (2000)	Things Shaped in Passing (2002)	Everywhere, and Right Here (2004)

Professional ratings
Review scores
Source	Rating
Allmusic	2.5/5 stars

Things Shaped in Passing is the third studio album from Ohio post-rock band The Six Parts Seven. It was released August 31, 2004 and is their first release on their label, Suicide Squeeze. It includes the songs 'Spaces Between Days (Parts 3 & 4)' with parts 1 and 2 on their previous studio album, Silence Magnifies Sound.

The album artwork was created by Michael Loderstedt. According to the CD's liner notes, the song 'Now Like Photographs' was inspired Ange Leccia's works as well as Larry Levis' writing. According to the band's MySpace blog, this is the first album bandmates James Haas and Steve Clements record on, on lap-steel & guitar, and piano, respectively.

== Track listing ==
1. "Where Are the Timpani Heartbeats?" – 5:28
2. "Spaces Between Days (Part 3)" – 2:26
3. "Spaces Between Days (Part 4)" – 3:17
4. "Sleeping Diagonally" – 5:58
5. "Cold Things Never Catch Fire" – 6:50
6. "Seems Like Most Everything Used to Be Something Else" – 4:07
7. "Now Like Photographs" - 4:21
8. "The Want and the Waiting" - 8:50

== Personnel ==
- Allen Karpinski – guitars, samples, arrangements, steel finger slide (track 4)
- Jay Karpinski – drum kit
- Brad Visker – bass guitar
- Tim Gerak – guitars, samples
- James Haas – lap steel guitar, guitar, ebow (track 5)
- Steve Clements – grand piano
