= Everywhere, and Right Here =

Studio album by The Six Parts Seven
- Released: August 31, 2004
- Genre: Post-rock
- Length: 44:39
- Label: Suicide Squeeze
- Producer: Chris Keffer

The Six Parts Seven chronology
| Things Shaped in Passing (2002) | Everywhere, and Right Here (2004) | Casually Smashed to Pieces (2007) |

Professional ratings
Review scores
| Source | Rating |
|---|---|
| Allmusic | 4/5 stars |

Everywhere, and Right Here is the fourth studio album (not including a remix album, Lost Notes from Forgotten Songs) from Ohio post-rock band The Six Parts Seven. It was released on August 31, 2004.

== Track listing ==
1. "What You Love You Must Love Now" – 5:22
2. "Already Elsewhere" – 5:01
3. "Saving Words for Making Sense" – 5:05
4. "This One or That One?" – 6:38
5. "What (We Can Just Make Out)" – 9:30
6. "The Quick Fire" – 3:23
7. "A Blueprint of Something Never Finished" - 7:29
8. "Nightlong" - 2:11

== Personnel ==
=== Six Parts Seven ===
Allen Karpinski - electric guitar, synthesizer
Tim Gerak - electric guitar
Jay Karpinski - drums, percussion
Mike Tolan - electric guitar, Fender Rhodes piano, bass guitar

=== Additional personnel ===
Brian Straw - acoustic guitar
Ben Vaughan - electric guitar, lap steel guitar
Steven Clements - piano
Eric Koltnow - vibraphone, percussion
