= Aspera (band) =

American indie rock band

- Origin: Philadelphia, Pennsylvania, United States
- Genres: Indie rock, psychedelic rock
- Years active: 1996–2007
- Labels: Burnt Toast Vinyl, Jagjaguwar Records, Suicide Squeeze Records, Big Wheel Recreation, Tigerstyle Records, Insound Records
- Spinoffs: Favourite Sons, Blood Feathers
- Past members: Mike Robinson; Drew Mills; Justin Tripp; Drew Worth; Matt Werth; Chris Powell; A.J. Edmiston

Aspera (initially Aspera Ad Astra) were an American indie rock band from Philadelphia, Pennsylvania.

== History ==
Aspera formed in 1996 under the name Aspera ad Astra in Philadelphia, and released a 7" split with Haelah before issuing their debut full-length in 1998. Following this the group underwent lineup changes before the release of their 1999 EP; several drummers would join and leave the group until late 2000, when A.J. Edmiston joined. Around this time the group shortened its name. They began releasing material on Jagjaguwar Records in 2002, including a re-release of their 2001 album Sugar & Feathered. 2007 saw Back When Love issued on Philadelphia label Burnt Toast Vinyl. Aspera were part of the so-called "Psychedelphia" scene, alongside bands such as Bardo Pond and The Lilys.

Aspera seems no longer to be a going concern. Tripp, Werth, and Edmiston, along with Carmine Degennaro, are now working with Ken Griffin, formerly of Irish band Rollerskate Skinny, as Favourite Sons. Drew Mills has formed the band Blood Feathers with Ben Dickey of Amen Booze Rooster.

== Members ==
Initial lineup

- Mike Robinson - vocals, keyboards
- Justin Tripp - guitar, keyboards
- Drew Worth - guitar
- Matt Werth - bass
- Drew Mills - drums, vocals, guitar

Later members

- Chris Powell - drums
- A.J. Edmiston - drums

== Discography ==
- Split with Haelah (1997)
- Peace (Audio Information Phenomena, 1998)
- Winged by Rhymes EP (Insound Records, 1999)
- Split with The Lilys (Tigerstyle Records, 2000)
- Sugar & Feathered (Big Wheel Recreation, 2001; reissued by Jagjaguwar Records, 2002)
- Birds Fly EP (Suicide Squeeze Records, 2002)
- Oh Fantastica (Jagjaguwar, 2003)
- Back When Love (Burnt Toast Vinyl, 2007)
