= Fort George Brewery =

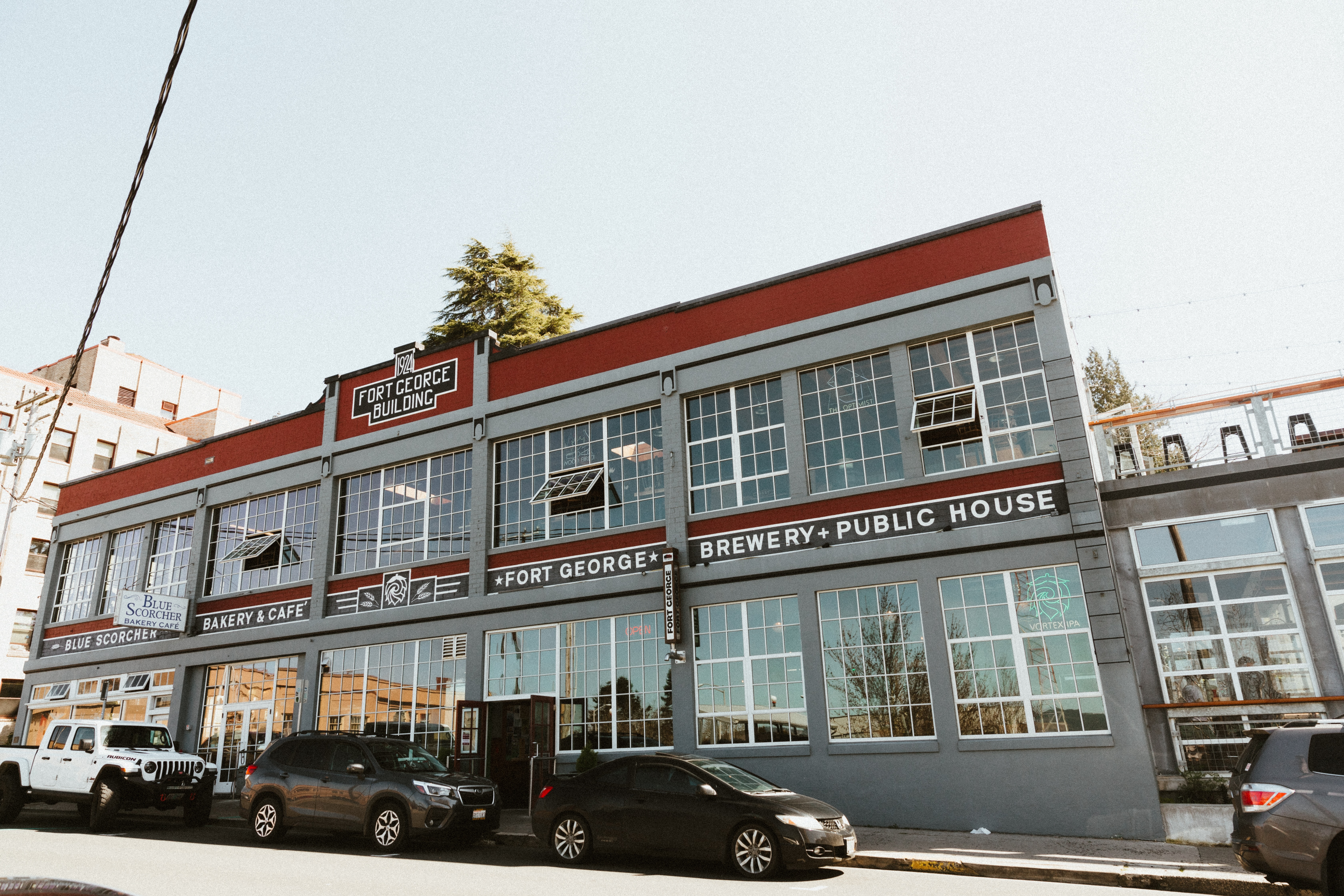
- Fort George's original Brewery & Public House on Duane Street in Astoria, Oregon
- Location: 1483 Duane Street; Astoria, Oregon, U.S.
- Opened: March 2007

Fort George Brewery is a craft brewery in the northwest United States located in Astoria, Oregon. The brewery produces about 60,000 beer barrels annually and is distributed throughout Oregon, Washington, Idaho, Northern California and Denver, CO. It is the 5th largest brewery in the state of Oregon and among the fastest growing breweries in the U.S. Fort George Brewery is known for its community engagement, popular seasonal releases, sustainability efforts and the annual Festival of Dark Arts, a stout beer festival which takes place every February in Astoria.

== History ==
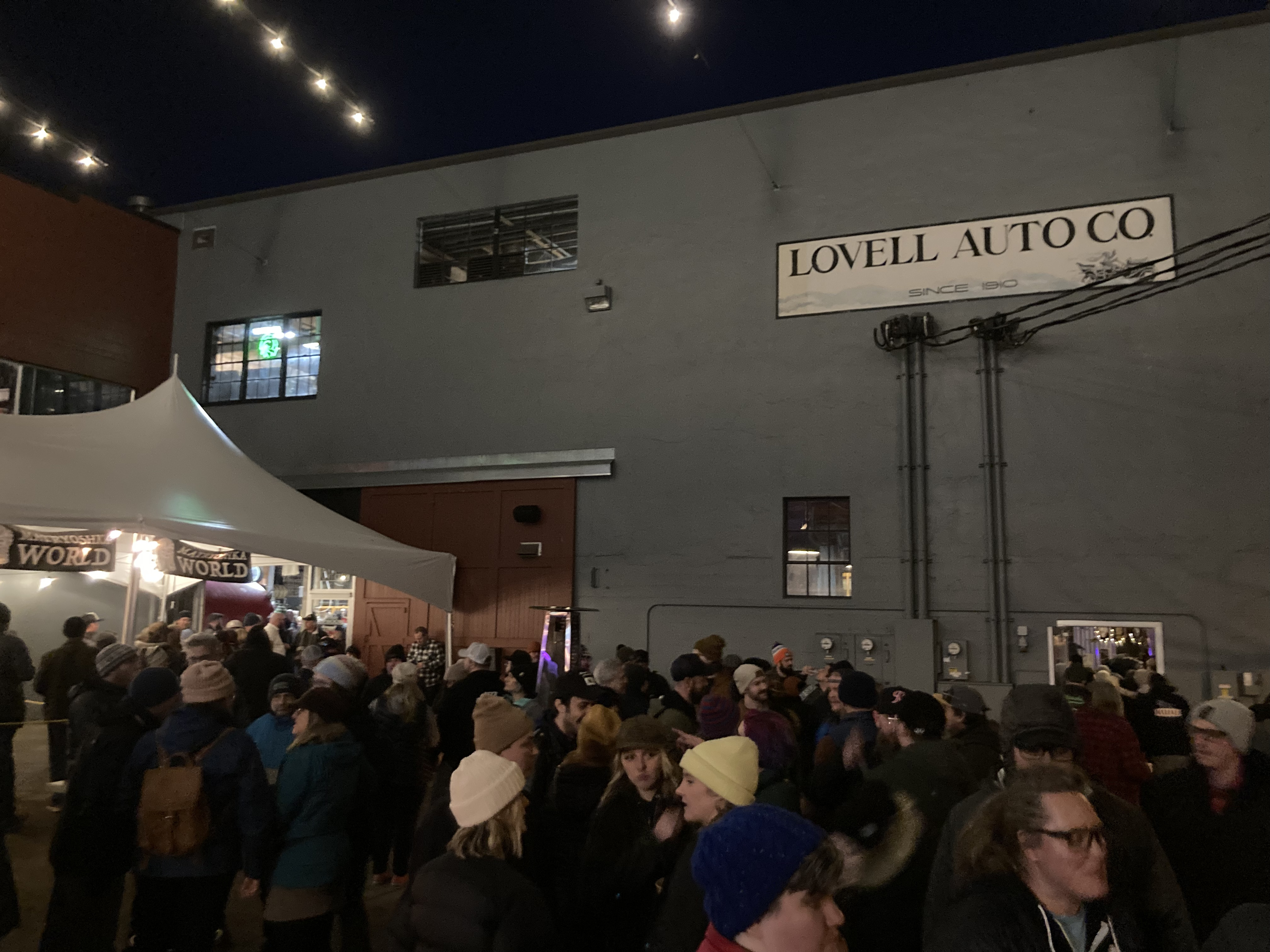
People gather outside the Lovell Building at the 2023 Festival of Dark Arts

Fort George Brewery and Public House opened in March 2007 on the site of the oldest American settlement on the U.S. west coast, Fort Astoria (also known as Fort George). The Fort George Building, previously an auto dealership and repair shop built in 1922, still houses the brewery's original 8.5-barrel brewhouse. In 2010, Fort George expanded into the neighboring Lovell Building with the addition of a 30-barrel brewhouse, a canning line, and the opening of the Lovell Taproom. In 2011, Fort George Brewery began distributing cans of their Vortex IPA, 1811 Lager, and Cavatica Stout in Oregon and Southwest Washington. In 2013, the brewery released their first canned seasonal 16-oz beer, Tender Loving Empire, a collaboration with the Portland-based record label of the same name. Since then, new seasonal and year-round canned varieties have been added including 3-Way IPA, Magnanimous IPA, Pizza Pals Hazy IPA, City of Dreams, in addition to multiple "one-off" releases from their two research and development breweries each month. In 2019 Fort George opened a production brewery on the Astoria Waterfront on the prior site of American Can Company, once a fish canning and labeling facility for the historic Elmore Cannery. They opened their "Beer Pier" Summer Waterfront Beer Garden in 2021, which is open July 4th - Labor Day each summer, offering live music, beer, food, and Columbia River views.

== Products ==
In addition to best sellers Vortex IPA, Cavatica Stout, and Pilsner, Fort George produces other award-winning year round beers including City of Dreams Pale Ale (World Beer Cup 2024: Gold in Hazy/Juicy Pale Ale) and Short Sands Lager (Oregon Beer Awards 2024: Gold in European Lagers), as well as popular seasonals like 3-Way IPA, and Matryoshka, a barrel aged imperial stout.
