= Flameshovel Records =

Flameshovel Records is a record label from Chicago, Illinois, formed in the summer of 2000. Founded by Jesse Woghin and long-time friend Nash Grey, the duo were later joined by James Kenler. Grey left for Philadelphia in 2003 to start grad school but the remaining partners forged ahead.

The label has since put out 43 releases, including releases by Maritime, Chin Up Chin Up, Lying in States, and Bound Stems.

The label has not released an album since September 2007.

== Artists who have released material on Flameshovel ==
- Bound Stems
- Che Arthur
- Chin Up Chin Up
- Viza-Noir
- Ancient Greeks
- The Dudley Corporation
- The End of the World
- Joan of Arse
- The Joggers
- Judah Johnson
- Low Skies
- Lukestar
- Lying in States
- Make Believe
- Mannequin Men
- Maritime
- The Narrator
- The Race
- Russian Circles
- Sybris
- Voltage
- White Savage

== See also ==
- List of record labels
