= Lauren Andino =

American singer

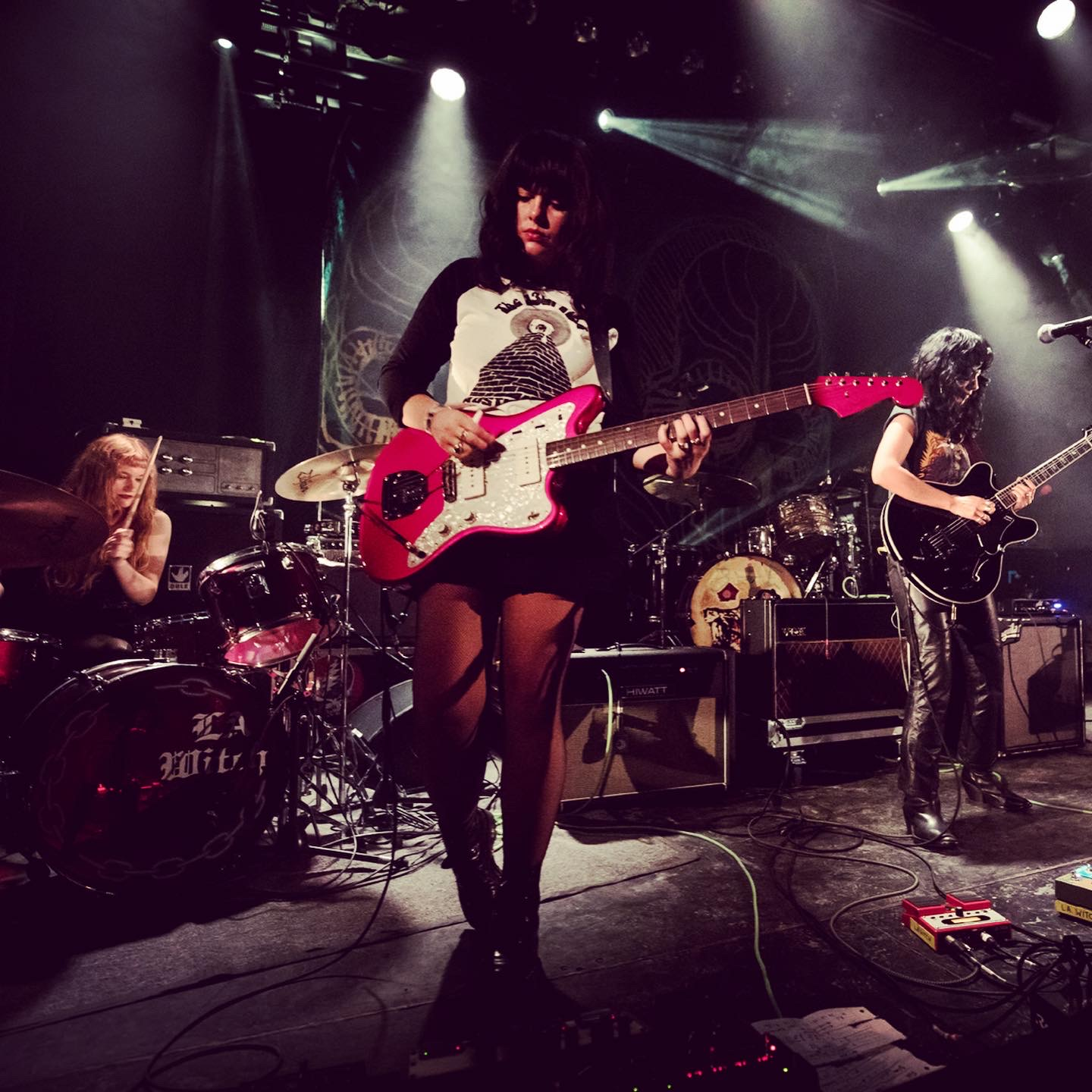
- Andino performing live with L.A. Witch.

Background information
- Born: Columbia, South Carolina, U.S.
- Genres: Shoegaze, Dream pop, Grunge, Alternative Rock, Noise
- Occupations: Artist, Musician, Guitarist
- Instruments: Guitar, vocals
- Label: Little Cloud Records
- Member of: Tremours, L.A. Witch
- Website: tremoursmusic.com

Lauren Andino is an American artist, musician, and co-founder of DL Skateboards. Raised in Columbia, South Carolina, Andino moved to Brooklyn, New York, as a young adult, where she played in several bands. She is currently the singer and guitarist for the shoegaze pop band Tremours with drummer Glenn Fryatt. Since August 2021, she has been playing guitar and touring with L.A. Witch.

Known for her reverb soaked guitar tones and ghostly vocal melodies, Andino is an endorsed artist for both the United Kingdom amplifier company Hiwatt and Fender (company) guitars.

Andino is also a touring member of LSD and the Search for God. In 2023, she accompanied them on vocals and guitar for a month of sold-out dates in the United States and Canada, supporting the UK-based band Panchiko.

She currently resides in Los Angeles, California.

== DL Skateboards ==
Andino formed DL Skateboards with Derek Mabra in 2011. Of her inspiration for starting the company, she told Vogue:

In the 1960s, if you wanted a skateboard, you carved and painted it yourself, and that is what we make, a classic skateboard with a modern twist.

Andino designs and paints each DL Skateboard collection. In an interview with the New York Daily News, she stated that:

A lot of the designs come from '60s, surf style or a classic kid toys, and they are hand-painted. So even if you get the same design, each board is different.

In 2014, Marie Claire named her one of the 5 Women Running the Show Behind Iconic Male Brands along with executives from Anheuser-Busch, Playboy, and ESPN. The Daily Beast profiled her as a "skater chick turned entrepreneur".
