= Page France =

2000s American indie folk pop band

- Origin: Cumberland/Hagerstown, Maryland, United States
- Genres: Indie folk Indie pop
- Years active: 2004-2008
- Labels: Suicide Squeeze Records; Fall Records
- Spinoffs: Cotton Jones
- Past members: Clinton Jones; BJ Lewis; Bryan Martin; Whitney McGraw; Chris Morris; Michael Nau; Jasen Reeder; Matt Smith; David Tracy

Page France was an American indie folk-pop band, fronted by Michael Nau. Active between 2004 and 2008, the band played mainly emotional melodic music.

== History ==
The band was started as a solo project in 2004 by Michael Nau, but quickly evolved into a full-time project with a somewhat revolving lineup of friends and collaborators. The band self-released their debut album, Come, I'm A Lion, which was then picked up by Fall Records. Their second album, Hello, Dear Wind, was also released by Fall Records, then later re-released by Suicide Squeeze.

The band released a double-EP on Fall Records in 2006, entitled Pear and Sister Pinecone. Immediately thereafter, the EP was abandoned and declared a "limited release" of 1,000 copies.

A tour EP entitled Tomato Morning was sold on the band's tours in 2006.

Page France's last album and third full-length, ...and the Family Telephone, was released May 8, 2007 on Suicide Squeeze Records.

The songs "Chariot" and "Jesus", both from Page France's second album, Hello Dear Wind, were featured in the TV series Weeds.

The Broadway Hush, Michael Nau's other side project, released 2 colored 7" records on Velvet Blue Music, which had artwork created by Richard Swift. Their last record deal was with Suicide Squeeze Records, before the disbandment in 2008, because of band leader Michael Nau wanting to focus his full attention on Cotton Jones.

== Influence ==
Page France is now considered by critics as one of the most influential indie folk-pop bands of the mid-2000s, with comparisons to Conor Oberst and Jeff Tweedy. They're credited for inspiring future characteristics of indie folk-pop including “sing-songy” vocal work, percussive arrangements and strophic song forms.

== Discography ==
| Year | Title | Label |
|---|---|---|
| 2004 | Come, I'm a Lion | self-released / Fall Records |
| 2005 | Hello, Dear Wind | Fall Records / Suicide Squeeze Records |
| 2006 | Pear and Sister Pinecone (Double EP) | Fall Records |
| 2006 | Tomato Morning (Tour EP) | Suicide Squeeze Records |
| 2007 | ...and the Family Telephone | Suicide Squeeze Records |
