= Casually Smashed to Pieces =

Studio album by The Six Parts Seven
- Released: January 23, 2007
- Genre: Post-rock
- Length: 31:27
- Label: Suicide Squeeze Records
- Producer: Matt Bayles, The Six Parts Seven

The Six Parts Seven chronology
| Everywhere and Right Here (2004) | Casually Smashed to Pieces (2007) |

Professional ratings
Review scores
| Source | Rating |
|---|---|
| Pitchfork Media | (6.8/10) |

Casually Smashed to Pieces is the fifth studio album (not including their remix album) from post-rock band The Six Parts Seven. It was released January 23, 2007. The last song, "Everything Wrong is Right Again", is a reference to the song "Everything Right Is Wrong Again" by They Might Be Giants.

== Track listing ==
1. "Conversation Heart" – 1:15
2. "Stolen Moments" – 3:32
3. "Knock At My Door" – 6:07
4. "Falling Over Evening" – 5:07
5. "Awaiting Elemental Meltdown" – 4:21
6. "Confusing Possibilities" – 7:09
7. "Night Behind the Stars" - 1:15
8. "Everything Wrong is Right Again" - 2:41
