= Chin Up Chin Up =

American indie pop band

- Origin: Chicago, Illinois, USA
- Genres: Indie pop
- Years active: 2001–2009, 2024
- Labels: Flameshovel Records; Suicide Squeeze Records
- Past members: Jeremy Bolen; Nathan Snydacker; Greg Sharp; Chris Dye; Chris Saathoff; Jesse Woghin; Bobby Burg

Chin Up Chin Up is an American indie pop band formed in Chicago in 2001. The band briefly reunited for a pair of shows in Chicago in 2024.

== Members ==
The group's line-up included vocalist and guitarist Jeremy Bolen, formerly of Punjab and The Hertzsprung Gap, guitarist Nathan Snydacker, formerly of Nymb, bassist Chris Saathoff, drummer Chris Dye, and keyboardist Greg Sharp. After his death in 2004, Saathoff was replaced by Jesse Woghin. Woghin was later replaced by Bobby Burg of Love of Everything, Joan of Arc, and Make Believe.

== History ==
Immediately after forming, the band spent eight months recording their self-titled EP. After positive local reviews, the band opened for and toured with a variety of bands, including: Appleseed Cast, the Mercury Program, Pedro the Lion, the American Analog Set, Broken Social Scene, Smog, Minus the Bear, and Pinback. Soon after, the band began to record their debut album, We Should Have Never Lived Like We Were Skyscrapers, with John Congleton. Late at night on February 14, 2004, Chris Saathoff was killed in a hit and run accident as he was leaving a Ponys show at a local bar, the Empty Bottle, with his girlfriend. After their benefit shows in honor of their friend, Chin Up Chin Up regrouped to finish recording their album, We Should Have Never Lived Like We Were Skyscrapers, while including as many of Chris Saathoff's bass lines as possible. The album was released in 2004 on Flameshovel Records. Chin Up Chin Up released This Harness Can't Ride Anything on October 10, 2006, on Suicide Squeeze, a Seattle-based indie rock record label.

During most of 2007 Chin Up Chin Up promoted their new album This Harness Can't Ride Anything by performing many shows. Also for the first time they set foot outside North America to tour through Europe. Late 2007, after their last tour through the west of the USA, they decided that they needed a break. In 2008 Chin Up Chin Up kept very quiet, feeding rumors they had broken up. But in June 2008 they denied this. On their official site it was stated that the five of them "have just taken some time off to work on other things in their lives".

However, nine months later, in March 2009 lead singer Jeremy Bolen announced on the band's Myspace page that Chin Up Chin Up had indeed broken up and would play their last show on May 15: "I think I can speak for all of us when I say that we really had intentions to keep making music together for an infinite amount of time, but just as this band began in a natural way it is naturally coming to an end. Thank you to the hundreds of people who have helped us along the way, we have been truly lucky, and as cliché as it may sound, we could not have done any of this without you."

Bolen, Burg, and Sharp went on to play in Vacations, and Dye plays drums in Speck Mountain and The Sweeps.

In May 2024, the band announced they would be reuniting for a show at Wicker Park Fest in Chicago on July 26. The band reunited to commemorate the 20-year anniversary of their album, We Should Have Never Lived Like We Were Skyscrapers, and to pay tribute to former bassist Chris Saathoff, who died in February 2004. A few days later, the band announced a second reunion show at the Burlington Bar in Chicago on July 27. The shows marked the band's first performances in over 15 years. No further reunion shows or plans have been announced beyond that.

== Discography ==
- Chin Up Chin Up – (May 15, 2002; Re-released w/ Bonus Tracks July 26, 2005)
- We Should Have Never Lived Like We Were Skyscrapers – (October 13, 2004)
- This Harness Can't Ride Anything – (October 10, 2006)
