= This Harness Can't Ride Anything =

Studio album by Chin Up Chin Up
- Released: October 10, 2006
- Recorded: 2006
- Genre: Indie pop
- Length: 41:48
- Label: Suicide Squeeze

Chin Up Chin Up chronology
We Should Have Never Lived Like We Were Skyscrapers (2004)	This Harness Can't Ride Anything (2006)

Professional ratings
Review scores
Source	Rating
Allmusic	4.5/5 stars
Pitchfork Media	(7.3/10)
Prefix Magazine	(8/10)
Metacritic	(74/100)

This Harness Can't Ride Anything is the second album by Chicago indie pop band Chin Up Chin Up, released October 10, 2006 on Suicide Squeeze Records.

== Track listing ==
1. "This Harness Can't Ride Anything" – 4:43
2. "Water Planes in Snow" – 3:47
3. "We've Got To Keep Running" – 3:52
4. "Islands Sink" – 3:41
5. "Mansioned" – 3:55
6. "I Need a Friend With a Boat" – 4:27
7. "Blankets Like Beavers" – 4:45
8. "Landlocked Lifeguards" – 5:02
9. "Stolen Mountains" – 3:09
10. "Trophies For Hire" – 4:22
