= The Years (EP) =

EP by Memoryhouse
- Released: September 13, 2011
- Genre: Dream pop, chillwave
- Length: 18:52
- Label: Sub Pop
- Producer: Evan Abeele

The Years is an EP and the first major release by Guelph, Ontario-based dream pop duo, Memoryhouse. It was released on September 13, 2011, and marked their debut with Sub Pop record label. The EP is a re-release of the original The Years, which Memoryhouse initially issued in February 2010 under Arcade Sound, a small independent record label.

== Critical reception ==
Professional ratings
Review scores
Source	Rating
Pitchfork Media	(6.3/10)
PopMatters	8/10 stars

Reception for The Years EP has been mixed. While many reviewers were very positive in regards to Memoryhouse's particular ambient sound, they noted that with so little music under their belt it seemed regressive that Memoryhouse release a redux of music they already recorded.

== Track listing ==
No.	Title	Length
1.	"Sleep Patterns"	3:43
2.	"Lately"	4:06
3.	"Modern, Normal"	4:23
4.	"To the Lighthouse"	4:22
5.	"Quiet America"	2:18
