= The Magic Magicians =

- Origin: Seattle, Washington, United States
- Genres: Indie rock
- Years active: 2000–present
- Labels: Suicide Squeeze Records

The Magic Magicians is an indie rock duo from Seattle, Washington formed in 2000. The group is composed of John Atkins (of 764-HERO) and Joe Plummer (of The Black Heart Procession), and is heavily influenced by 1970s rock and pop music. They released their debut, Girls, on Suicide Squeeze Records in 2001, and followed with a self-titled second album in 2003.

== Discography ==
- Girls (Suicide Squeeze, 2001)
- The Magic Magicians (Suicide Squeeze, 2003)
