= Wax Idols =

American post-punk band

- Origin: Oakland, California, U.S.
- Genres: Post punk; punk rock; indie rock
- Years active: 2011–2018
- Labels: HoZac; Slumberland; Suicide Squeeze
- Past members: Hether Fortune; Jennifer Mundy; Amy Rosenoff; Rachel Travers; Peter Lightning; Marisa Prietto; Greer McGettrick

Wax Idols was an American post-punk band from Oakland, California.

== History ==
Wax Idols was formed in 2011 in Oakland by lead singer and principal songwriter Hether Fortune. She has played in several Bay Area bands and was bassist for the band White Lung.

The band released their first album 'No Future' in 2011. Fortune wrote and sang most of the songs on the album and also played guitar, drums, and piano.

In 2013, the band released their album 'Discipline & Desire' Mark Burgess of The Chameleons co-produced and played bass on the last track "Stay In." Spin magazine called it "a master class in seething, moody songwriting."

The band released their third album 'American Tragic' in 2015. Fortune wrote and recorded the entire album aside from Rachel Travers on drums.

The band released their fourth and final album, 'Happy Ending' in 2018.

On August 27, 2018, the band announced an indefinite hiatus. Hether Fortune announced in a Facebook post that the remainder of the 2018 tour had been canceled "due to personal reasons."

== Discography ==
=== Studio albums ===
- No Future (2011, Hozac Records)
- Discipline And Desire (2013, Slumberland Records)
- American Tragic (2015, Etruscan Gold Records)
- Happy Ending (2018, Etruscan Gold Records)

=== Other Releases ===
- All Too Human / William Says 7" (2011, HoZac Records)
- Schadenfreude 7" (2012, Suicide Squeeze)
