= Nü Sensae =

Canadian band

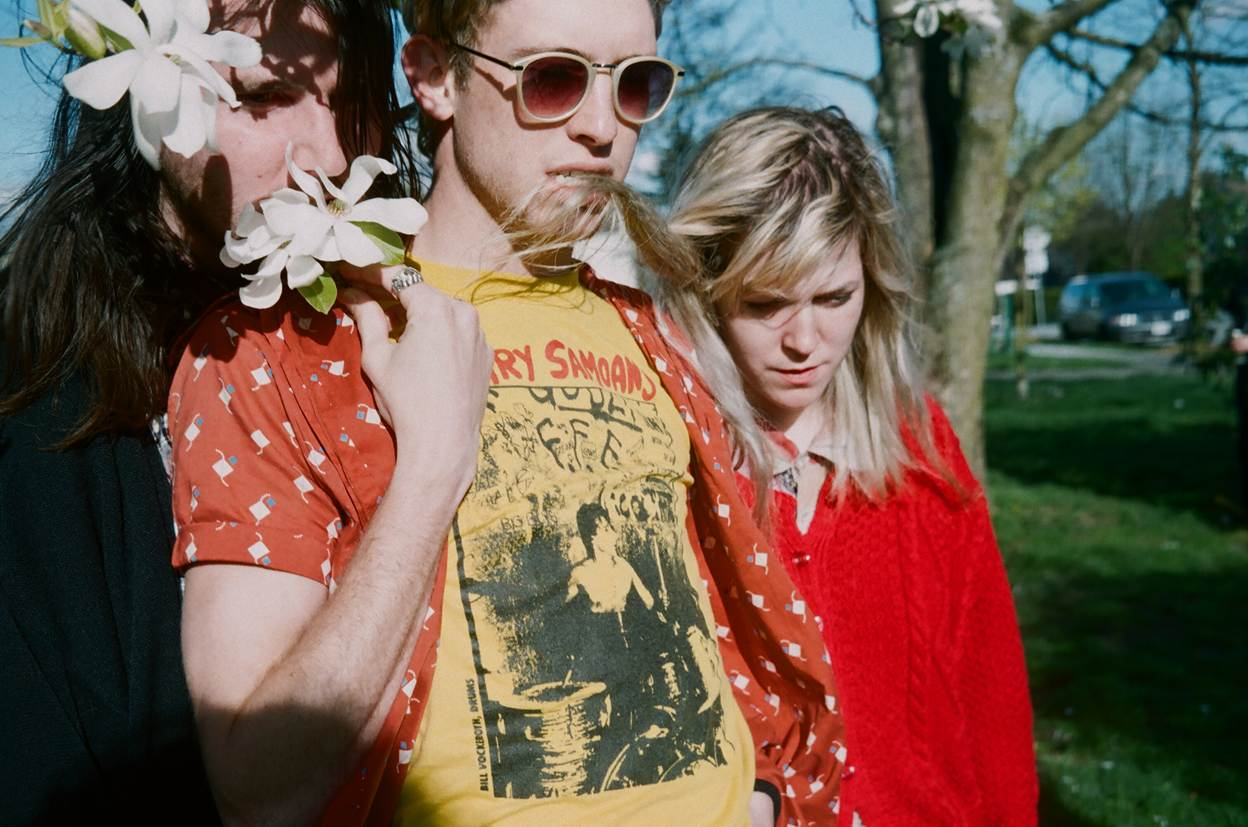

Background information
- Origin: Vancouver, British Columbia, Canada
- Genres: Punk, grunge
- Years active: 2008–2014 (on indefinite hiatus)
- Label: Suicide Squeeze
- Members: Andrea Lukic; Brody McKnight; Daniel Pitout
- Website: nusensae.tumblr.com

Nü Sensae is a Canadian punk and grunge trio from Vancouver composed of bassist-vocalist Andrea Lukic, drummer Daniel Pitout, and guitarist Brody McKnight. In 2012, Spin magazine named them in their list of top five best new artists. Nü Sensae are currently signed to Suicide Squeeze Records. Due to Pitout pursuing education in England, the group went on hiatus in August 2014.

== History ==
The band was formed as a duo in 2008, by Andrea Lukic and Daniel Pitout. From 2008 to 2011, the band released several EP's on labels such as Fast Weapons, Deranged Records, Isolated Now Waves, Swill Children, and Critiscum Internationale.

Nü Sensae released their first album, TV, Death and the Devil, in 2010 on Nominal Records which was named one of the top ten punk albums of the year by Exclaim! magazine. In September 2011, Nü Sensae announced the addition of guitarist Brody McKnight to the band. Their second album, Sundowning, was released on August 7, 2012, via Suicide Squeeze Records and was given an 8.0 rating by Pitchfork Media.

Nü Sensae have also been associated with the queercore or queer rock genre, with the band's openly gay drummer, Daniel Pitout, having been featured in several gay publications and for his work in AIDS activism as founder of the AIDS Day Music Project (or ADMP). Pitout was named one of the most eligible gay bachelors of 2013 by OUT magazine. Pitout also performs masked as country singer Orville Peck.

== Band members ==
- Andrea Lukic – bass guitar, vocals
- Brody McKnight – guitar
- Daniel Pitout – drums

== Discography ==
=== Albums ===
Self Titled

- Released: 2008
- Label: Isolated Now Waves
- Tracks: "Raven Tussle", "1992", "Don't Panic", "Cut Throat Nine", "The Witch", "Brain Aid", "Peter Tripp", "Graceland"

TV, Death and the Devil

- Released: 2010
- Label: Nominal Records
- Tracks: "New Lies", "Total Drift", "I'm A Body", "Worm(s)", "Cat's Cradle", "Skull Mecca", "Strange Games", "Sweet Thing", "Disappearing Act", "Passing The Word", "Night Talker", "Burn Zero"

Sundowning

- Released: 2012
- Label: Suicide Squeeze Records
- Tracks: "First Born", "Swim", "100 Shades", "Burnt Masks", "Dust", "Tea Swamp Park", "Whispering Rule", "Spit Gifting", "Tajna", "Orange Roses", "Curdle The Cream", "First Born (Reprise)", "Say What You Are", "Eat Your Mind"

=== Singles and EPs ===
Three Dreams

- Released: 2009
- Label: Critiscum Internationale
- Tracks: "Mowgli and Sly", "Mens Rea", "Worm(s)", "Fantum"

Sorrow

- Released: 2010
- Label: Swill Children
- Tracks: "New Lies", "Force Feed", "UV Dust"

Tea Swamp Park

- Released: 2010
- Label: Fast Weapons
- Tracks: "Tea Swamp Park", "Gumbo", "Dust"

Clown Life (White Lung)

- Released: 2010
- Label: Deranged Records / Nominal Records
- Tracks: "Aristocrat", "Eat Your Mind"

=== Various artist compilations ===
The Emergency Room Vol 1 – "Graceland", "Don't Panic", "Peter Tripp"

- Released: 2008
- Label: Nominal Records / Grotesque Modern
- Tracks: "Graceland" Nu Sensae, "Don't Panic" Nu Sensae, "Peter Tripp" Nu Sensae

Nite Prison – "Dubai For Now (Party Vers.)"

- Released: 2011
- Label: Nominal Records / Grotesque Modern
- Tracks: "Dubai For Now (Party Vers.)" Nü Sensae
