= Tomato Morning =

Studio album by Page France
- Released: November 2006
- Genre: Indie rock
- Label: Suicide Squeeze
- Producer: Page France

Page France chronology
Pear and Sister Pinecone (2006)	Tomato Morning (2006)	...And The Family Telephone (2007)

Tomato Morning is a tour-only EP by Maryland-based indie folk band Page France. It was released on Suicide Squeeze Records in 2006.

== Track listing ==
1. "Without a Diamond Ring" - 2:55
2. "Give Him A Blanket" - 3:10
3. "Who Cracked Your Egg?" - 3:06
4. "Tomato Morning" - 3:17
