= The Six Parts Seven/The Black Keys EP =

The Six Parts Seven/The Black Keys

EP by The Black Keys
- Released: September 16, 2003
- Genre: Post-rock, Blues-rock
- Length: 27:39
- Label: Suicide Squeeze Records

The Black Keys chronology
The Big Come Up (2002)	The Six Parts Seven/The Black Keys (2003)	Thickfreakness (2003)

The Six Parts Seven/The Black Keys is a split-EP by Ohio bands The Six Parts Seven and The Black Keys. Released in 2003, it featured "A Blueprint Of Something Never Finished" by The Six Parts Seven and three live tracks from The Black Keys. The live tracks are from a performance at WMBR on 16 May 2003.

== Track listing ==
1. "A Blueprint of Something Never Finished" (The Six Parts Seven)
2. "The Moan" (The Black Keys)
3. "Thickfreakness" (The Black Keys)
4. "Yearnin'" (The Black Keys)

== Personnel ==
- Allen Karpinski - track 1; guitar
- Jay Karpinski - track 1; drums
- Tim Gerak - track 1; guitar
- Dan Auerbach - track 2, 3, 4; vocals, guitar
- Patrick Carney - track 2, 3, 4; drums
