= The Six Parts Seven =

American post-rock band

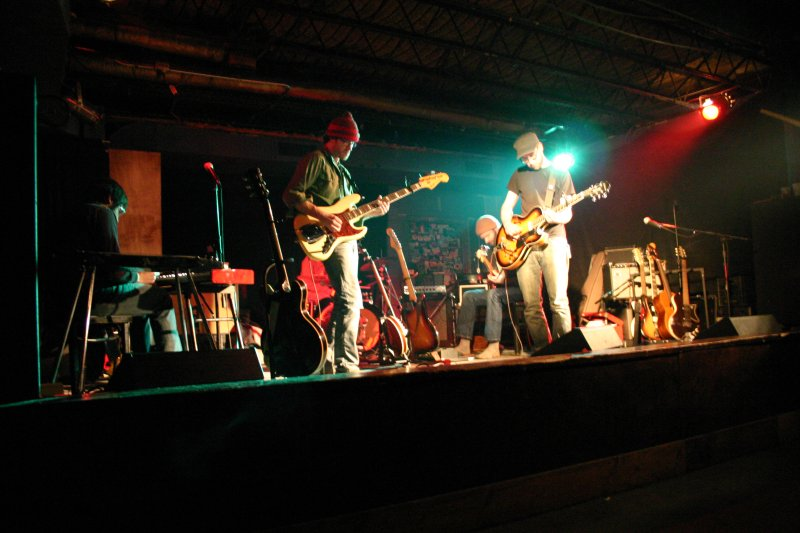
- The Six Parts Seven performing in 2006

Background information
- Origin: Kent, Ohio, U.S.
- Genres: Post-rock
- Years active: 1995–2008
- Label: Suicide Squeeze
- Members: Allen Karpinski; Jay Karpinski; Tim Gerak; Mike Tolan; Steve Clements; Jake Trombetta; Jennifer Court
- Past members: Brad Visker; Ben Vaughan; Eric Koltnow; Matt Haas; Mary Mazzer; Heather Wiker

The Six Parts Seven is an American post-rock band from Kent, Ohio. The band was founded in 1995 by brothers Allen and Jay Karpinski (playing guitar and drums, respectively), who had earlier played with Old Hearts Club. In 1997, guitarist Tim Gerak was added to the lineup. As of 2024, they had issued six studio albums as well as other releases such as EPs, remix albums, and compilations.

== Background ==
Most of the group's music is instrumental, featuring multiple undistorted electric guitars, with bass and drums, as well as electric lap steel guitar, viola, and occasionally piano, vibraphone, or trumpet. The band has had a fluid lineup that has included vibraphonist Eric Koltnow and lap steel player Ben Vaughan.

The Six Parts Seven's name is based on a 1676 quote from Virginia Governor William Berkeley: "How miserable that man is that governs a people where six parts of seven at least are poor, indebted, discontented and armed". In an interview with The California Aggie, horn player Keith Freund offered the alternative explanation that the name derives from a childhood game between brothers Jay and Allen.

The band's music has been used by NPR's All Things Considered news program as transition music.

== History ==
The Six Parts Seven released their debut studio album, In Lines and Patterns..., in 1998. They followed it with Silence Magnifies Sound in 2000, Things Shaped in Passing in 2002, Everywhere, and Right Here in 2004, and Casually Smashed to Pieces in 2007. In 2024, they published a collaborative album with Goodmorning Valentine, titled Kissing Distance, which was originally recorded in 2006.

== Band members ==
Current

- Allen Karpinski – guitar, bass, keyboards
- Jay Karpinski – drums
- Tim Gerak – guitar, banjo, Lap steel guitar, samples
- Mike Tolan – bass, guitar, organ, banjo
- Steve Clements – keyboards
- Jake Trombetta – lap steel guitar, guitar, piano
- Jennifer Court – clarinet

Past

- Brad Visker – bass
- Ben Vaughan – lap steel guitar
- Eric Koltnow – vibraphone
- Matt Haas – lap steel guitar
- Mary Mazzer – lap steel guitar
- Heather Wiker – viola
- Keith Freund – trumpet, baritone horn

== Discography ==
=== Studio albums ===
- In Lines and Patterns... (1998)
- Silence Magnifies Sound (2000)
- Things Shaped in Passing (2002)
- Everywhere, and Right Here (2004)
- Casually Smashed to Pieces (2007)
- Kissing Distance (2024)

=== EPs ===
- The Six Parts Seven/The Black Keys EP (2003)
- The Attitudes of Collapse (2003)

=== Remix albums ===
- Lost Notes from Forgotten Songs (2003)

=== Unofficial releases ===
- The Six Parts Seven (1995)
- Untitled EP (Solo Singles Series) (2001)

=== Compilations ===
- Slightest Indication of Change (2000)
- Troubleman Mix-Tape (2001)
- Devil in the Woods 52 (2002)
