= ...And the Family Telephone =

Studio album by Page France
- Released: May 8, 2007
- Genre: Indie rock
- Label: Suicide Squeeze Records
- Producer: Page France

Page France chronology
Tomato Morning (2006)	...And the Family Telephone (2007)

Professional ratings
Review scores
Source	Rating
Allmusic	3/5 stars
Pitchfork Media	7.5/10

...And the Family Telephone is the third full-length album by Maryland-based indie folk band Page France. It was released May 8, 2007, on Suicide Squeeze Records.

== Track listing ==
No.	Title	Length
1.	"The Ruby Ring Man"	3:15
2.	"Wet Dog Afternoon"	2:43
3.	"Mr. Violin and Dancing Bear"	3:57
4.	"Be My Pianist"	2:09
5.	"Pigeons"	2:15
6.	"Hat and Rabbit"	3:08
7.	"A Belly to the Sea"	3:17
8.	"The Belly in the Fish"	2:50
9.	"Rooster and Its Crow"	3:17
10.	"The Joker's Joke"	3:29
11.	"Here's a Telephone"	2:42
12.	"Beggar's Table Legs"	3:18
13.	"Circus Head (Nobody Knows)"	3:17
14.	"Casting Day"	2:34
