= Tall Hours in the Glowstream =

Tall Hours In the Glowstream

Studio album by Cotton Jones
- Released: August 24, 2010
- Recorded: Cumberland, Maryland, Winterville, Georgia, Fenwick Island, Delaware, Spring 2010
- Genre: Indie folk, psychedelic folk, dream pop, chamber pop
- Length: 35:20
- Label: Suicide Squeeze Records

Cotton Jones chronology
Paranoid Cocoon (2009)	Tall Hours In the Glowstream (2010)

Tall Hours in the Glowstream is the third album by Cotton Jones, which was released on August 24, 2010. Michael Nau and Whitney McGraw recorded the majority of the album in their living room while they were staying in Winterville, Georgia, and the sound of the record is equal parts gospel, Southern soul, and backwoods folk. The album is a change from the Southern Gothic nocturnal vibes of The River Strumming and the moody psychedelic folk of Paranoid Cocoon into a brighter chamber pop.

== Track listing ==
No.	Title	Length
1.	"Sail of the Silver Morning"	3:25
2.	"Somehow To Keep It Going"	4:36
3.	"Glorylight and Christie"	3:34
4.	"Man Climbs Out of the Winter"	3:52
5.	"Song In Numbers"	3:27
6.	"Soft Mountain Shake"	1:56
7.	"Place At the End of the Street"	3:10
8.	"More Songs For Margaret"	3:40
9.	"Goethe Nayburs"	1:47
10.	"Dream On Columbia Street"	2:51
11.	"No Things I Need (Like Some Time Ago)"	3:02
