= Station (album) =

Studio album by Russian Circles
- Released: May 6, 2008
- Recorded: December 2007 at Studio Litho in Seattle, Washington
- Genre: Post-rock, post-metal, instrumental rock
- Length: 43:23
- Label: Suicide Squeeze; Sargent House
- Producer: Matt Bayles

Russian Circles chronology
Enter (2006)	Station (2008)	Russian Circles / These Arms Are Snakes (2008)

Professional ratings
Aggregate scores
Source	Rating
Metacritic	73/100 link
Review scores
Source	Rating
AbsolutePunk.net	84% link
AllMusic	link
The A.V. Club	B- link
Pitchfork Media	6.9/10 link
The Stranger	link
Sputnikmusic	link

Station is the second studio album by American post-metal band Russian Circles and was released on May 6, 2008. This is the band's second release and first with their new label, Suicide Squeeze.

== Track listing ==
No.	Title	Length
1.	"Campaign"	6:40
2.	"Harper Lewis"	7:15
3.	"Station"	8:43
4.	"Verses"	8:43
5.	"Youngblood"	7:34
6.	"Xavii"	4:29
Total length:		43:23

Japanese bonus track
No.	Title	Length
7.	"Upper Ninety"	5:18

== Personnel ==
Russian Circles

- Mike Sullivan − guitar
- Dave Turncrantz − drums
- Brian Cook − bass guitar
- Morgan Henderson − double bass

Technical personnel

- Matt Bayles − production, engineering, mixing, additional keyboards and organ
- Ed Brooks − mastering
- Jonathan Krohn − album design

== Charts ==
Chart (2008)	Peak position
US Heatseekers Albums (Billboard)	36
