= Paranoid Cocoon =

Studio album by Cotton Jones
- Released: January 27, 2009
- Recorded: Kingdom Crumb Studios, Cumberland, Maryland, 2008
- Genre: Indie folk, Psychedelic folk, Dream pop
- Length: 41:11
- Label: Suicide Squeeze Records

Cotton Jones chronology
| The River Strumming (2008) | Paranoid Cocoon (2009) | Tall Hours in the Glowstream (2010) |

Paranoid Cocoon is the second album by Cotton Jones, which was released on January 27, 2009. It was the band's debut on Suicide Squeeze Records. The band's sound was described as an "intriguing mix of country and melancholy psychedelia" and comparisons were made with Johnny Cash, Mazzy Star, and Beach House.

== Track listing ==
| No. | Title | Length |
|---|---|---|
| 1. | "Up a Tree (Went This Heart I Have)" | 3:48 |
| 2. | "Gotta Cheer Up" | 3:12 |
| 3. | "Some Strange Rain" | 4:02 |
| 4. | "Gone the Bells" | 4:14 |
| 5. | "Photo Summerlude" | 2:27 |
| 6. | "By Morning Light" | 5:12 |
| 7. | "Cotton & Velvet" | 3:54 |
| 8. | "Little Ashtray in the Sun" | 3:12 |
| 9. | "Blood Red Sentimental Blues" | 4:36 |
| 10. | "I Am the Changer" | 6:34 |
