= Acoustics II =

Studio album by Minus the Bear
- Released: September 4, 2013
- Genre: Indie rock
- Label: Tigre Blanco Records
- Producer: Minus The Bear

Minus the Bear chronology
Infinity Overhead (2012)	Acoustics II (2013)	Lost Loves (2014)

Professional ratings
Review scores
Source	Rating
AllMusic	3/5 stars

Acoustics II is the first acoustic full-length album from Minus the Bear. It marks the second acoustic work by the band, following 2008's Acoustics EP, encompassing songs from all their previous albums. Acoustics II includes two new compositions and eight other re-imagined versions of band and fan favorites. It was released on September 4, 2013 through the band's own Tigre Blanco Records, following a successful PledgeMusic campaign.

== Track listing ==
No.	Title	Original album	Length
1.	"Riddles"
2.	"The Game Needed Me"	Menos el Oso
3.	"Absinthe Party at the Fly Honey Warehouse"	Highly Refined Pirates
4.	"Diamond Lightning"	Infinity Overhead
5.	"Hooray"	Menos el Oso
6.	"The Storm"
7.	"When We Escape"	Planet of Ice
8.	"Summer Angel"	OMNI
9.	"Empty Party Rooms"	Infinity Overhead
10.	"Dayglow Vista Rd."	OMNI

== Personnel ==
- Jake Snider – Vocals, Guitar
- Dave Knudson – Guitar
- Erin Tate – Drums, Percussion
- Cory Murchy – Bass
- Alex Rose – Keyboards, Vocals
