= Interpretaciones del Oso =

Remix album by Minus the Bear
- Released: February 20, 2007
- Genres: Indie rock, experimental rock
- Length: 44:57
- Label: Suicide Squeeze Records

Minus the Bear chronology
Menos el Oso (2005)	Interpretaciones del Oso (2007)	Planet of Ice (2007)

Professional ratings
Review scores
Source	Rating
AllMusic	link

Interpretaciones del Oso is a remix album by Minus the Bear, released on February 20, 2007 through Suicide Squeeze Records. Various artists reinterpreted and remixed songs from their second full-length Menos el Oso. "Interpretaciones del Oso" means "Interpretations of the Bear" in Spanish.

== Track listing ==
No.	Title	Length
1.	"Drilling" (P.O.S. Redo)	3:43
2.	"Memphis & 53rd" (FOG Remix)	4:06
3.	"Fulfill The Dream" (Old Italy Remix by Tyondai Braxton)	3:21
4.	"This Ain't a Surfin' Movie" (IQU 06 Mix)	4:35
5.	"The Fix" (Plan B Remix by James van Leuven)	4:21
6.	"Hooray" (Dark Baby Remix)	2:56
7.	"The Game Needed Me" (The Oktopus Remix)	4:38
8.	"Pachuca Sunrise" (Alias Remix)	4:19
9.	"Michio's Death Drive" (Michio A.K.A. Monostereo Remix)	3:47
10.	"El Torrente" (J. Clark Remix)	4:06
11.	"The Pig War" (O, Hunter Remix by Morgan Henderson)	5:05

== Personnel ==
- Jake Snider - Vocals, Guitar
- Dave Knudson - Guitar
- Erin Tate - Drums
- Cory Murchy - Bass
- Matt Bayles - Electronics

=== Other personnel ===
- Mastered by Ed Brooks
