= Heather Duby =

American singer/songwriter

- Born: Eugene, Oregon, U.S.
- Genres: Experimental rock, indie rock, pop
- Years active: 1997–present
- Labels: Sonic Boom Recordings; Sub Pop Records
- Members: Heather Duby; Erin Tate; Laurie Kearny; Alex Rose
- Website: www.heatherduby.com

Heather Duby (born July 26, 1974, in Eugene, Oregon) is an American singer-songwriter.

== History ==
Heather Duby grew up in Portland, Oregon, studied at Evergreen State College, located in Olympia, Washington. She relocated to Seattle in 1994. For several years, Duby fronted her own band and worked the Seattle restaurant industry. In 1998, she worked with producer Steve Fisk to record her first album, Post to Wire, on Sub Pop Records.

In 2001, Duby released an EP, Symbient, with the improvisational electronic band Elemental (which featured members of Maktub and FCS North).

In 2003, Duby released Come Across the River on Sonic Boom Recordings.

In July 2006, Duby released an eponymously titled album which featured Erin Tate and Alex Rose, members of Seattle's Minus the Bear. She has performed in the Seattle indie scene for over 12 years. Duby has shared the stage with Minus the Bear, Maritime, David Bazan, Headlights, Camera Obscura, Interpol and Criteria.

In 2007, Duby relocated to the New York City area. Duby released a six track EP entitled Latency via Amazon and iTunes on January 4, 2011. She is currently recording her fourth yet-to-be-named album with producer Matt Bayles (Minus the Bear, Isis, Mastodon) at Red Room Studios in Seattle.

In mid 2011, Duby was in a car accident that injured her hands and required multiple surgeries.

In 2017, Duby earned a law degree (J.D.) from New York Law School.

== Band members ==
- Heather Duby -Vocals, keyboard, piano, guitar
- Laurie Kearney - Dulcimer, bass
- Erin Tate- Drums
- Alex Rose -Guitar

== Discography ==
Studio albums

- Post to Wire (Sub Pop Records, 1999)
- Come Across the River (Sonic Boom Recordings, 2003)
- Heather Duby (Sonic Boom Recordings, 2006)
- Latency (Self-released via Amazon and iTunes, 2011)
- Undone (Self-released via Amazon and iTunes, 2020)

EPs

- with Elemental: Symbient (Sub Pop Records, 2001)

Other appearances

- Vocals on Menos El Oso by Minus the Bear (Suicide Squeeze Records, 2005)
- Vocals on They Make Beer Commercials Like This by Minus the Bear (Suicide Squeeze Records, 2004)
- "I Must Have Been Blind" on Sing a Song for You: Tribute to Tim Buckley (Manifesto Records, Summer 2000)
- Abuhatzeira War Ein Großer, Fettes Schwein
