= Acoustics (Minus the Bear EP) =

EP by Minus the Bear
- Released: October 7, 2008
- Recorded: Red Room, August 24–29 and September 9, 2008
- Genre: Indie rock
- Label: Tigre Blanco Records
- Producers: Minus The Bear, Matt Bayles

Minus the Bear chronology
Planet of Ice (2007)	Acoustics (2008)	Omni (2010)

Professional ratings
Review scores
Source	Rating
Pitchfork	5.2/10

Acoustics is an acoustic EP from Minus the Bear. It was released on October 7, 2008, through Tigre Blanco Records. It contains an unreleased track, "Guns & Ammo", and acoustic versions of six tracks previously released in electric versions on Highly Refined Pirates, Menos el Oso, and Planet of Ice.

== Track listing ==
No.	Title	Original album	Length
1.	"Guns & Ammo"		3:59
2.	"We Are Not a Football Team"	Highly Refined Pirates	2:57
3.	"Burying Luck"	Planet of Ice	4:26
4.	"Knights"	Planet of Ice	4:00
5.	"Pachuca Sunrise"	Menos el Oso	3:38
6.	"Throwin' Shapes"	Planet of Ice	3:26
7.	"Ice Monster"	Planet of Ice	4:10
Total length:			26:40

== Personnel ==
- Jake Snider – Vocals, Guitar
- Dave Knudson – Guitar
- Erin Tate – Drums, Percussion
- Cory Murchy – Bass
- Alex Rose – Keyboards, Vocals

=== Production ===
- Produced by Minus the Bear and Matt Bayles
- Recorded and Mixed by Matt Bayles
- Mastered by Chris Common
- Additional recording by Jake Snider and Alex Rose
