= This Is What I Know About Being Gigantic =

EP by Minus the Bear
- Released: November 12, 2001
- Recorded: Studio Litho, Spectre
- Genres: Indie rock, math rock, experimental rock
- Length: 25:34
- Label: Suicide Squeeze Records
- Producers: Minus The Bear, Matt Bayles

Minus the Bear chronology
This Is What I Know About Being Gigantic (2001)	Highly Refined Pirates (2002)

Professional ratings
Review scores
Source	Rating
Pitchfork	8.6/10
Sputnikmusic	3.5/5

This Is What I Know About Being Gigantic is the debut release from Minus the Bear.

== Track listing ==
No.	Title	Length
1.	"Hey, Wanna Throw Up? Get Me Naked"	3:49
2.	"Lemurs, Man, Lemurs"	3:10
3.	"Untitled"	2:07
4.	"Intro"	1:12
5.	"Just Kickin' It Like a Wild Donkey"	4:10
6.	"Potato Juice & Liquid Bread"	4:59
7.	"Pantsuit...Uggghhh"	5:56

== Personnel ==
- Jake Snider - Vocals & Guitar
- Dave Knudson - Guitar
- Erin Tate - Drums
- Cory Murchy - Bass
- Matt Bayles - Electronics

=== Production ===
- Recorded by Matt Bayles and Minus The Bear
- Mixed by Matt Bayles
- Assisted by Troy Tiejten and Tom Harpel
- Mastered by Ed Brooks
