= Lost Loves (album) =

Studio album by Minus the Bear
- Released: October 7, 2014
- Genres: Math rock, experimental rock, progressive rock
- Length: 42:44
- Label: Dangerbird
- Producer: Minus the Bear

Minus the Bear chronology
Acoustics II (2013)	Lost Loves (2014)	Voids (2017)

Professional ratings
Review scores
Source	Rating
AllMusic	3.5/5 stars

Lost Loves is an album from Minus the Bear. The album contains rare and unreleased songs from the band's history. It was released on October 7, 2014, through Dangerbird Records.

== Track listing ==
No.	Title	Length
1.	"Electric Rainbow"	3:41
2.	"Surf-n-Turf"	3:35
3.	"Broken China"	5:39
4.	"Walk on Air"	3:33
5.	"Patiently Waiting"	4:12
6.	"Cat Calls & Ill Means"	3:37
7.	"Invented Memory"	4:25
8.	"South Side Life"	4:17
9.	"Your Private Sky"	4:47
10.	"The Lucky Ones"	4:58

== Personnel ==
- Jake Snider – Vocals, Guitar
- Dave Knudson – Guitar
- Erin Tate – Drums, Percussion
- Cory Murchy – Bass
- Alex Rose – Keyboards, Vocals
