= All at Once (Screaming Females album) =

Studio album by Screaming Females
- Released: February 23, 2018
- Genres: Rock, punk rock
- Length: 50:40
- Label: Don Giovanni
- Producers: Matt Bayles; Screaming Females

Screaming Females chronology
Rose Mountain (2015)	All at Once (2018)	Desire Pathway (2023)

Professional ratings
Aggregate scores
Source	Rating
AnyDecentMusic?	8.0/10
Metacritic	86/100
Review scores
Source	Rating
AllMusic	4/5 stars
The A.V. Club	A−
Clash	8/10
Drowned in Sound	8/10
Exclaim!	8/10
The Line of Best Fit	8/10
Paste	8.4/10
Pitchfork	8.0/10
Tiny Mix Tapes	4/5
Under the Radar	7/10

All at Once is the seventh studio album by American indie rock band Screaming Females, released on February 23, 2018, by Don Giovanni Records. It was produced by the band and Matt Bayles.

Music videos were recorded for the songs "Deeply", "Glass House" and "I'll Make You Sorry", with the last directed by Lance Bangs.

One of the album's songs refers to the American abstract painter Agnes Martin.

== Track listing ==
All tracks are written by Screaming Females.

No.	Title	Length
1.	"Glass House"	3:44
2.	"Black Moon"	4:00
3.	"I'll Make You Sorry"	4:11
4.	"Dirt"	2:02
5.	"Agnes Martin"	4:14
6.	"Deeply"	2:24
7.	"Soft Domination"	2:49
8.	"End of My Bloodline"	2:19
9.	"Chamber for Sleep Pt. 1"	5:38
10.	"Chamber for Sleep Pt. 2"	2:37
11.	"Bird in Space"	4:51
12.	"Fantasy Lens"	3:42
13.	"My Body"	2:30
14.	"Drop by Drop"	1:10
15.	"Step Outside"	4:29
Total length:		50:40

== Personnel ==
Personnel adapted from album liner notes.

Screaming Females

- Mike Abbate – bass guitar
- Jarrett Dougherty – drums, percussion, Moog
- Marissa Paternoster – vocals, guitar, keyboards

Additional musicians

- Alex Abrams – cello (track 1)
- Brendan Canty – drums (track 7)
- Nouela Johnston – piano (track 11)

== Charts ==
Chart (2018)	Peak position
US Heatseekers Albums (Billboard)	2
US Independent Albums (Billboard)	14
US Tastemakers Albums (Billboard)	17
