= Desire Pathway =

Studio album by Screaming Females
- Released: February 17, 2023
- Recorded: 2022
- Studios: Lakehouse Recording (Asbury Park, New Jersey); Pachyderm (Cannon Falls, Minnesota)
- Genres: Alternative rock, indie rock
- Length: 33:08
- Language: English
- Label: Don Giovanni
- Producer: Matt Bayles

Screaming Females chronology
All at Once (2018)	Desire Pathway (2023)

We were still writing remotely, and I was like "Should I change the lyrics to a lot of these songs so that it's more reflective of what we're probably going to put out in the near future, or should I just keep the older lyrics that have nothing to do with the pandemic?"... I think I needed to use the lyrical aspect of this record as a therapeutic mechanism, which is what I use art for. I was just like "You know what? I'm just gonna keep them. I'm gonna do my past self that service."

— Frontwoman Marissa Paternoster on writing the music for Desire Pathway during the COVID-19 pandemic

Desire Pathway is the eighth and final studio album by American punk blues band Screaming Females.

== Reception ==
Professional ratings
Aggregate scores
Source	Rating
Metacritic	81/100
Review scores
Source	Rating
AllMusic	4/5 stars
Beats Per Minute	8/10 stars
Pitchfork	6.8/10

Editors at AllMusic rated this album 4 out of 5 stars, with critic Mark Deming writing that it is punk rock for being "brave, smart, honest, and expressive". Ian Cohen of Pitchfork rated this release a 6.8 out of 10, calling it a "solid album of old-school riffs and ripping solos", but criticizing the songwriting. Editors of Stereogum chose this as Album of the Week, with critic Tom Breihan remarking that producer Matt Bayles helps the band sound heavy and "it feels so good to hear them doing what they do again". In a June round-up of the best albums of 2023, the publication placed this at 18, with Rachel Brodsky calling it "the sound of a long running band doing exactly what it does best: earth-quaking riffs; tight, propulsive drumming; and Marissa Paternoster's unmatched vocal quaver".

Editors at AllMusic included this on their list of favorite rock albums of 2023.

== Track listing ==
1. "Brass Bell" – 4:24
2. "Desert Train" – 2:50
3. "Let You Go" – 3:30
4. "Beyond the Void" – 2:57
5. "Mourning Dove" – 3:13
6. "It's All Said and Done" – 2:23
7. "Ornament" – 3:22
8. "So Low" – 2:34
9. "Let Me into Your Heart" – 4:43
10. "Titan" – 3:17

== Personnel ==
Screaming Females

- Michael Abbate – bass guitar
- Jarrett Dougherty – drums, percussion, synthesizer
- Marissa Paternoster – guitar, vocals, keyboards, artwork

Additional personnel

- Matt Bayles – engineering, mixing, production
- Eric Bennett – engineering
- Ed Brooks – mastering
- Dan Chabanov – photography
- Kate Wakefield – cello on "Beyond the Void"

== See also ==
- List of 2023 albums
