= Milk Teeth (disambiguation) =

Milk teeth may refer to:

- Milk Teeth, an English punk rock band
  - Milk Teeth, the 2020 self-titled album by the band
- Milk Teeth (film), a political fantasy film
- Milk Teeth (novel), a novel by Amrita Mahale
- Milk Teeth, a 2022 EP by Suki Waterhouse
- Deciduous teeth, also known informally as milk teeth, is the first set of teeth in the growth of humans and many other mammals

== See also ==
- Baby teeth (disambiguation)
