= Joe Steinhardt =

American musician and producer (born 1984)

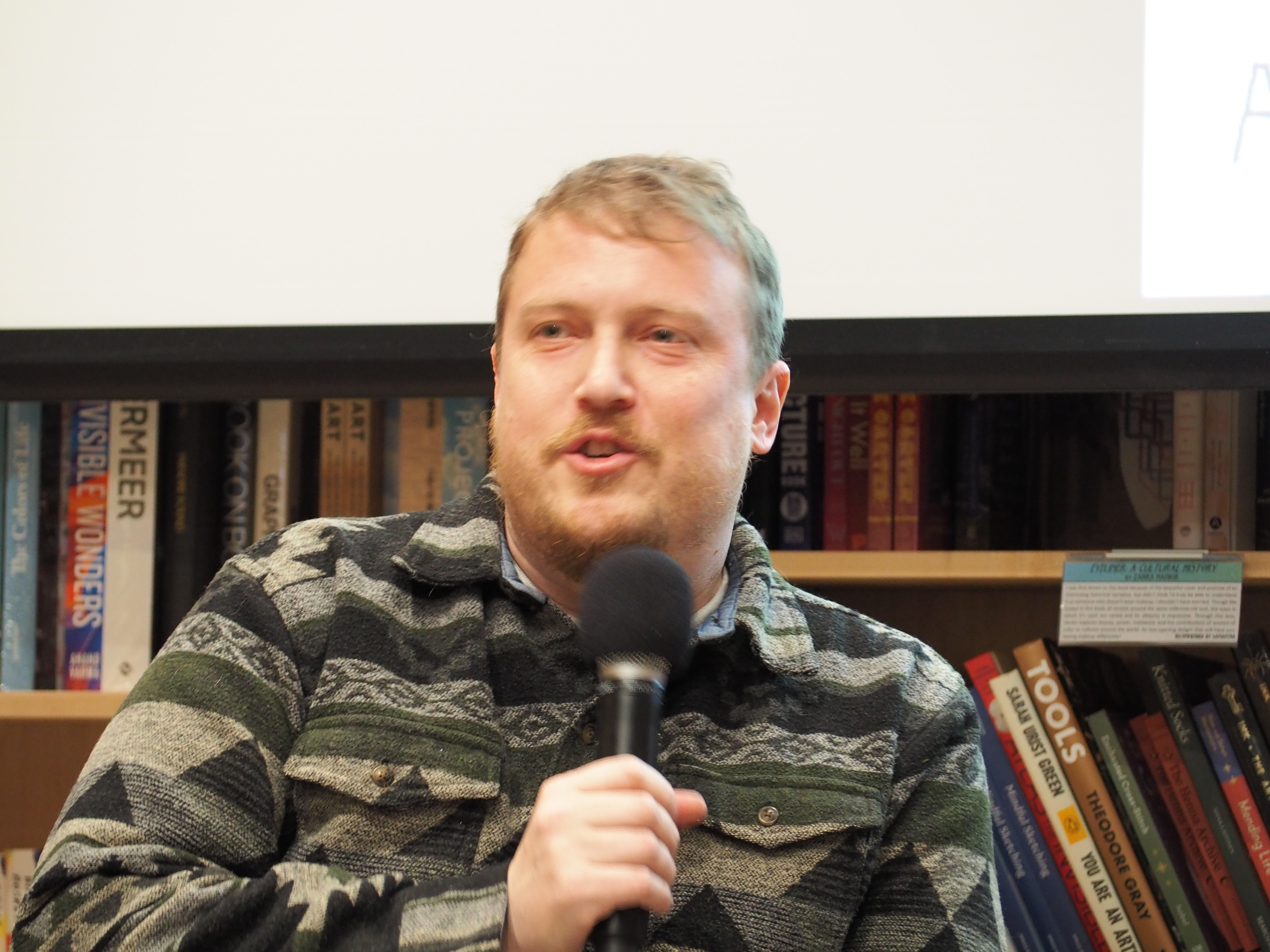

Background information
- Born: Joseph Steinhardt; June 6, 1984 (age 42); Philadelphia, Pennsylvania, United States
- Origin: New Brunswick, New Jersey
- Genres: Punk rock, Indie Rock, Alternative rock
- Occupations: Singer, musician, record producer, author
- Instrument: Guitar
- Years active: 2002–present
- Label: Don Giovanni

Joe Steinhardt (born June 6, 1984), is an American singer, musician, record producer, and author, best known as the co-founder of Don Giovanni Records.

== Biography ==
In the late 1990s, Steinhardt began to attend punk rock shows in and around New Brunswick, New Jersey.

In 2002, with his friend Zach Gajewski, he founded Don Giovanni Records which played an instrumental role in launching the careers of artists like Mitski, Waxahatchee, Screaming Females, Laura Stevenson, Moor Mother and Irreversible Entanglements.

In 2016 Steinhardt was named one of the 25 most influential people in New Jersey music by NJ.com. That same year he launched the New Alternative Music Festival.

Steinhardt has been a vocal critic of streaming music and published his first book Why to Resist Streaming Music & How through Microcosm Publishing.

In 2024 Steinhardt released a graphic novel Merriment with Marissa Paternoster.

Steinhardt received his Ph.D. from Cornell University in 2015 and is currently an associate professor of Music Business at Drexel University. He serves as vice president for the board of directors of Hillel International at Drexel University.

== Discography ==
=== With For Science ===
- Revenge For Hire (LP, Don Giovanni Records, 2006)
- Way Out Of Control (EP, Don Giovanni Records, 2007)
- Tomorrow's Just Another Day (LP, Don Giovanni Records, 2007)

=== With Modern Hut ===
- Generic Treasure (LP, Don Giovanni Records, 2013)
- I Don't Want To Get Adjusted To This World (LP, Don Giovanni Records, 2021)

== Bibliography ==
- Steinhardt, Joe; Paternoster, Marissa (2024-03-19). Merriment. Don Giovanni Records. ISBN 978-1-7375245-3-3.
- Why to Resist Streaming Music & How, ISBN 9781648410161
