= They Make Beer Commercials Like This =

EP by Minus the Bear
- Released: June 13, 2004 (original); June 3, 2008 (re-release)
- Recorded: Studio Litho, April 18–25, 2004
- Genres: Indie rock, alternative rock
- Length: 22:01 (original); 25:56 (re-release)
- Labels: Arena Rock Recording Co. (original), Suicide Squeeze (re-release)
- Producers: Minus The Bear; Matt Bayles

Minus the Bear chronology
Highly Refined Pirates (2002)	They Make Beer Commercials Like This (2004)	Menos el Oso (2005)

They Make Beer Commercials Like This is the third EP released by the band Minus the Bear on the Arena Rock Recording Co. After being remastered, it was re-released on June 3, 2008, through Suicide Squeeze Records with an added track, "Houston, We Have Uh-Oh". This song was originally released on the compilation, In Honor: A Compilation To Beat Cancer.

== Reception ==
Professional ratings
Review scores
Source	Rating
AllMusic	3.5/5 stars
Pitchfork	6.4/10 stars

Reviews for the EP have been mixed. AllMusic praised its complexity and "constantly shifting, tricky rhythms". Both AllMusic and Pitchfork commented on the band's pattern of creating playfully odd titles for songs that are completely serious, but Pitchfork considered this a negative, and additionally criticized the lack of any progression in the band's music over their years of existence. They marked "Dog Park" and "Pony Up" as strong tracks, and concluded "The prevalence of so much filler on a six-song EP is discouraging, and marks this EP as just another placeholder in a career long sustained primarily by placeholder EPs."

== Track listing ==
Arena Rock Recording Co. release on July 13, 2004
No.	Title	Length
1.	"Fine + 2 Pts"	3:50
2.	"Let's Play Clowns"	3:37
3.	"Dog Park"	2:36
4.	"I'm Totally Not Down With Rob's Alien"	4:06
5.	"Hey! Is That A Ninja Up There?"	4:05
6.	"Pony Up!"	3:47

Suicide Squeeze Records release on June 3, 2008
No.	Title	Length
7.	"Houston, We Have Uh-Oh"	3:53

== Personnel ==
Minus the Bear

- Jake Snider - Vocals & Guitar
- Dave Knudson - Guitar
- Erin Tate - Drums
- Cory Murchy - Bass
- Matt Bayles - Electronics

Other personnel

- Additional vocals from Heather Duby on the track "I'm Totally Not Down With Rob's Alien"
- Recorded and Mixed by Matt Bayles
- Mastered by Ed Brooks

== Trivia ==
- The song title "Houston, We Have Uh-Oh" was taken from an episode of Sealab 2021 titled "Vacation."
- Some copies bore a sticker on the cover that stated "Pronounced with an 'Umpty'".
