= Power Move (album) =

Studio album by Screaming Females
- Released: April 14, 2009
- Recorded: Hunt Studio
- Genre: Indie rock, punk rock
- Length: 34:05
- Label: Don Giovanni

Screaming Females chronology
What If Someone Is Watching Their T.V.? (2007)	Power Move (2009)	Castle Talk (2010)

Professional ratings
Review scores
Source	Rating
Impose	Favorable
New York Times	Favorable
Punknews.org	4/5 stars
Spin	Favorable

Power Move is the third studio album by Screaming Females, released by Don Giovanni Records on April 4, 2009. It was their first on Don Giovanni Records and their first not to be self-released.

== Track listing ==
All songs written by Screaming Females (Jarrett Dougherty, Mike "King Mike" Abbate, Marissa Paternoster).

1. "Bell" – 2:24
2. "Sour Grapes" – 2:25
3. "Skull" – 4:40
4. "Treacher Collins" – 3:59
5. "Starving Dog" – 2:41
6. "Lights Out" – 4:07
7. "I Believe In Evil" – 2:59
8. "Adult Army" – 4:59
9. "Halfway Down" – 2:37
10. "Buried In The Nude" – 3:18
