= Rose Mountain (album) =

Studio album by Screaming Females
- Released: February 24, 2015
- Genres: Indie rock, punk rock, alternative rock
- Length: 35:04
- Label: Don Giovanni
- Producer: Matt Bayles

Screaming Females chronology
Ugly (2012)	Rose Mountain (2015)	All At Once (2018)

Professional ratings
Aggregate scores
Source	Rating
Metacritic	77/100
Review scores
Source	Rating
AllMusic	4/5 stars
The A.V. Club	B+
Paste	7.5/10
Pitchfork	6.7/10
Rolling Stone	3/5 stars
Spin	8/10

Rose Mountain is the sixth studio album by Screaming Females, released on February 24, 2015, by Don Giovanni Records.

Lance Bangs directed a music video for the song "Hopeless," which included animation made by Marissa Paternoster. Bangs also made a two-part documentary about the band, their tour, and the making of the album.

A deluxe version of the album was released digitally for an Australian tour.

== Track listing ==
All music is composed by Screaming Females.

No.	Title	Length
1.	"Empty Head"	3:58
2.	"Ripe"	3:10
3.	"Wishing Well"	3:25
4.	"Burning Car"	3:17
5.	"Broken Neck"	3:11
6.	"Rose Mountain"	3:52
7.	"Hopeless"	2:43
8.	"Triumph"	4:48
9.	"It's Not Fair"	1:22
10.	"Criminal Image"	5:18
Total length:		35:04

Australian Deluxe Digital Tour Edition
No.	Title	Length
1.	"Empty Head"	3:58
2.	"Ripe"	3:10
3.	"Wishing Well"	3:25
4.	"Burning Car"	3:17
5.	"Broken Neck"	3:11
6.	"Rose Mountain"	3:52
7.	"Hopeless"	2:43
8.	"Triumph"	4:48
9.	"It's Not Fair"	1:22
10.	"Criminal Image"	5:18
11.	"Let Me In"	2:38
12.	"Skeleton"	3:43
13.	"Hopeless"	2:43
Total length:		44:08

== Accolades ==
Publication	Accolade	Year	Rank
Stereogum	The 50 Best Albums of 2015	2015	#20
