= Infinity Overhead =

Studio album by Minus the Bear
- Released: August 28, 2012
- Genres: Math rock, experimental rock, progressive rock
- Length: 41:19
- Labels: Dangerbird, Big Scary Monsters (UK)
- Producers: Matt Bayles, Minus The Bear

Minus the Bear chronology
Omni (2010)	Infinity Overhead (2012)	Acoustics II (2013)

Infinity Overhead is the fifth full-length album from Minus the Bear, released on August 28, 2012. It is their second album to be released on Dangerbird Records and was produced by the band's former keyboardist, Matt Bayles. The album was also released in the UK by Big Scary Monsters Recording Company in September.

It is their last album with drummer Erin Tate, who left the band in January 2015.

Professional ratings
Aggregate scores
Source	Rating
Metacritic	(67/100)
Review scores
Source	Rating
AllMusic	3/5 stars
Alternative Press	4.5/5 stars
Kerrang!	3/5 stars
Rock Sound	8/10 stars
Under The Gun Review	9/10

== Track listing ==
No.	Title	Length
1.	"Steel and Blood"	3:49
2.	"Lies and Eyes"	4:01
3.	"Diamond Lightning"	5:00
4.	"Toska"	4:31
5.	"Listing"	3:35
6.	"Heaven Is a Ghost Town"	4:49
7.	"Empty Party Rooms"	3:43
8.	"Zeros"	3:30
9.	"Lonely Gun"	3:45
10.	"Cold Company"	5:06

== Personnel ==
=== Minus the Bear ===
- Jake Snider - Lead vocals, Guitar
- Dave Knudson - Guitar, Omnichord
- Erin Tate - Drums
- Cory Murchy - Bass
- Alex Rose - Keyboards, Vocals, Saxophone

=== Production ===
- Produced by Matt Bayles and Minus The Bear
- Assisted by Derek Moree and Stephen Hogan
- Mastered by Bernie Grundman
