= Baby teeth (disambiguation) =

Baby teeth are the first set of teeth in the growth development of humans and many other mammals.

Baby Teeth may also refer to:

== Music ==
- Baby Teeth (band), a Chicago-based indie pop/rock band
- Babyteeth (Therapy? album), 1991
- Baby Teeth (Screaming Females album), 2006
- "Baby Teeth", a song by Bug Hunter from The Rough Draft
- "Baby Teeth", a song by Haley Blais from Wisecrack

== Other ==
- Babyteeth (film), a 2019 film
- Babyteeth (play), a play by Rita Kalnejais
- Babyteeth (typeface), a 1966 typeface by Milton Glaser
- Baby Teeth, a novel by Zoje Stage
