= What If Someone Is Watching Their T.V.? =

Studio album by Screaming Females
- Released: June 22, 2007
- Genre: Indie rock, punk
- Length: 35:55
- Label: Self-released, Don Giovanni Records

Screaming Females chronology
Baby Teeth (2006)	What If Someone Is Watching Their T.V.? (2007)	Power Move (2009)

Professional ratings
Review scores
Source	Rating
Robert Christgau	(choice cut)

What If Someone Is Watching Their T.V.? is the second studio album by Screaming Females. Originally self-released in 2007, it was re-released on Don Giovanni Records in 2009 and later re-released again on October 4, 2011, this time on vinyl.

== Track listing ==
All songs written by Screaming Females (Jarrett Dougherty, Mike "King Mike" Abbate, Marissa Paternoster).

1. "Theme Song" – 2:52
2. "The Real Mothers" – 3:03
3. "Humanity Arranged" – 4:01
4. "Starve The Beat" – 4:39
5. "Little Anne" – 1:46
6. "Fun" – 3:23
7. "Limbs" – 4:24
8. "Pedro" – 3:27
9. "Mothership" – 4:41
10. "Boyfriend" – 3:43
