= Castle Talk =

Studio album by Screaming Females
- Released: September 14, 2010
- Recorded: Hunt
- Genres: Indie rock, punk rock
- Length: 36:45
- Label: Don Giovanni

Screaming Females chronology
Power Move (2009)	Castle Talk (2010)	Ugly (2012)

Professional ratings
Aggregate scores
Source	Rating
Metacritic	79/100
Review scores
Source	Rating
AllMusic	3/5 stars
Pitchfork	7.9/10
Spin	4/5 stars
Uncut	3/5 stars

Castle Talk is the fourth studio album by Screaming Females, released on September 4, 2010, by Don Giovanni Records.

== Track listing ==
All songs written by Screaming Females (Jarrett Dougherty, Mike "King Mike" Abbate, Marissa Paternoster).

1. "Laura and Marty" – 3:57
2. "I Don't Mind It" – 3:28
3. "Boss" – 3:56
4. "Normal" – 2:50
5. "A New Kid" – 3:20
6. "Fall Asleep" – 4:04
7. "Wild" – 3:42
8. "Nothing at All" – 3:11
9. "Sheep" – 3:06
10. "Deluxe" – 1:43
11. "Ghost Solo" - 3:32
