= Nearer My God =

Studio album by Foxing
- Released: August 10, 2018
- Genre: Art rock; indie rock; emo; electronic; post-rock; dream pop
- Length: 56:28
- Label: Triple Crown
- Producer: Chris Walla, Eric Hudson

Foxing chronology
Dealer (2015)	Nearer My God (2018)	Draw Down the Moon (2021)

Singles from Nearer My God
- 1. "Slapstick" Released: June 18, 2018; 2. "Nearer My God" Released: July 19, 2018; 3. "Gameshark" Released: August 1, 2018

Nearer My God is the third studio album by American rock band, Foxing. The album was released on August 10, 2018 through Triple Crown Records.

== Background ==
On June 18, 2018 the album was announced, which coincided with the release of the first single off the album, "Slapstick".

On July 19, 2018, the title track and second single was released. Ian Cohen, writing for Pitchfork, praised the synths in the track, saying that it could "go moonshot for moonshot with M83 and The 1975".

== Critical reception ==
Professional ratings
Aggregate scores
Source	Rating
AnyDecentMusic?	7.7/10
Metacritic	82/100
Review scores
Source	Rating
The A.V. Club	A−
Drowned in Sound	9/10
Exclaim!	7/10
The Line of Best Fit	8/10
Pitchfork	8/10

Nearer My God was met with "universal acclaim" reviews from critics. At Metacritic, which assigns a weighted average rating out of 100 to reviews from mainstream publications, this release received an average score of 82 based on 11 reviews. Aggregator Album of the Year gave the release a 78 out of 100 based on a critical consensus of 13 reviews.

Beth Bowles of Exclaim! gave the release a 7 out of 10, explaining "while Foxing haven't totally abandoned their previous post-punk roots, Nearer My God clings tight to experimental synth-rock. This album has the kind of confusion we associate with Radiohead; sometimes it's rock, sometimes it's punk, sometimes it's just noise." Ian Cohen of Pitchfork explained "Nearer My God is likewise a closed system bound with melodic and lyrical leitmotifs, but designed more like a multimedia extravaganza. It’s an album of complicated, often elusive views on the illusion of control, an apocalypse that always feels impending but never arrives."

== Track listing ==
No.	Title	Length
1.	"Grand Paradise"	4:46
2.	"Slapstick"	4:29
3.	"Lich Prince"	4:46
4.	"Gameshark"	4:43
5.	"Nearer My God"	3:35
6.	"Five Cups"	9:07
7.	"Heartbeats"	4:02
8.	"Trapped in Dillard's"	3:49
9.	"Bastardizer"	4:12
10.	"Crown Candy"	4:08
11.	"Won't Drown"	4:57
12.	"Lambert"	3:54
Total length:		56:28

== Charts ==
Chart performance for Nearer My God
Chart (2018)	Peak position
US Heatseekers Albums (Billboard)	4
US Independent Albums (Billboard)	7
US Top Tastemaker Albums (Billboard)	4
US Top Vinyl Albums (Billboard)	2
