= The Albatross (album) =

Studio album by Foxing
- Released: November 12, 2013
- Recorded: January 2 – April 29, 2013
- Genre: Emo; chamber rock; indie rock; math rock; post-rock
- Length: 32:02
- Label: Count Your Lucky Stars
- Producer: Ryan Wasoba

Foxing chronology
Old Songs (2012)	The Albatross (2013)	Dealer (2015)

Singles from The Albatross
- 1. "Rory" Released: 2013

The Albatross is the debut studio album by American indie rock band Foxing. The album was released on November 12, 2013 through Count Your Lucky Stars Records.

== Reception ==
Professional ratings
Review scores
Source	Rating
Alternative Press	3.5/5 stars
Punknews.org	4.5/5 stars
Sputnikmusic	4/5 stars

"Rory" appeared on a best-of emo songs list by Vulture.

== Track listing ==
All tracks are written by Foxing; orchestration by Sam Naumann.

No.	Title	Length
1.	"Bloodhound"	2:25
2.	"Inuit"	4:02
3.	"The Medic"	3:26
4.	"Pent Up in a Blind"	0:44
5.	"Rory"	3:41
6.	"Bit by a Dead Bee, Pt. 1"	3:29
7.	"Bit by a Dead Bee, Pt. 2"	4:19
8.	"Den Mother"	3:34
9.	"Calm Before"	1:42
10.	"Quietus"	4:40
Total length:		32:02

== Personnel ==
=== Foxing ===
- Conor Murphy – vocals
- Ricky Sampson, Eric Hudson – guitar
- Josh Coll – bass
- Jon Hellwig – drums

=== Additional musicians ===
- Madeline Lackey, Sarah Moncey, Emma Tiemann – vocals
- Dre Concepcion – flute
- Adam Gabbert – alto and baritone saxophone
- Justin Reynolds – trombone
- Tom Pini – accordion
- Annette Moeller – violin
- Liz Myers – cello

=== Technical personnel ===
- Ryan Wasoba – producer, recording engineer, mixing engineer
- Hamilton Ketchum, Tom Pini – recording engineer
- Carl Saff – mastering engineer
- Brian Arnold – design, layout
- Kevin Russ – photography
