= Foxing (album) =

Studio album by Foxing
- Released: September 13, 2024
- Genre: Rock
- Length: 56:01
- Label: Grand Paradise
- Producer: Eric Hudson

Foxing chronology
Draw Down the Moon (2021)	Foxing (2024)

Foxing is the fifth studio album by American rock band Foxing. It was released on September 13, 2024 via Grand Paradise. Production was handled by member Eric Hudson with additional producer Ian Jones. Music videos were directed for "Greyhound" and "Hell 99" by the band themselves.

== Critical reception ==
Professional ratings
Aggregate scores
Source	Rating
Metacritic	88/100
Review scores
Source	Rating
The Line of Best Fit	9/10
Pitchfork	7.8/10
PopMatters	8/10
Spectrum Culture	80/100%
Sputnikmusic	5/5
Under the Radar	8.5/10 stars

Foxing was met with generally favourable reviews from music critics. At Metacritic, which assigns a normalized rating out of 100 to reviews from mainstream publications, the album received an average score of 88 based on five reviews.

Sputnikmusic staff reviewer praised the album, saying "Foxing may be a cacophonous, unhinged symphony of chaos, but it's also one that quietly encourages us to look at what's already around us, open our arms, and embrace it while we still can...to reach out and touch what is real. It is one of the most dissonant, powerful, legitimately terrifying, and ultimately uplifting pieces of music I've ever heard". Kyle Kohner of The Line of Best Fit stated: "by leaning into powerful dynamics and their natural propensity for climactic moments, Foxing has crafted a remarkably emotional statement about feeling emotionless". Caleb Campbell of Under the Radar found "the results are ambitious, expressive, and the most exciting work Foxing have yet delivered". Brian Stout of PopMatters wrote: "Foxing have delivered the spiritual sequel nearly its equal and show they are at their best following their muse. While having it all might not have happened for Foxing (yet), what they do have is pretty damned impressive". Holly Hazelwood of Spectrum Culture concluded: "self-titled, self-released and self-produced, Foxing is the kind of album a band only makes after recognizing where they're going and instead, running in the exact opposite direction". Ian Cohen of Pitchfork resumed: "for 56 minutes Foxing alternately thrills and confounds but provides little in the way of catharsis".

== Track listing ==
All tracks are written by Conor Murphy, Eric Hudson, Jon Hellwig, Brett Torrence and Ian Jones.

No.	Title	Length
1.	"Secret History"	4:01
2.	"Hell 99"	4:27
3.	"Spit"	4:17
4.	"Greyhound"	8:04
5.	"Cleaning"	3:25
6.	"Barking"	3:33
7.	"Kentucky McDonald's"	3:53
8.	"Looks Like Nothing"	5:26
9.	"Gratitude"	4:13
10.	"Dead Cat"	1:50
11.	"Dead Internet"	2:57
12.	"Hall of Frozen Heads"	6:20
13.	"Cry Baby"	3:36

== Personnel ==
- Foxing – songwriters
  - Conor Murphy – artwork, layout
  - Eric Hudson – producer, mixing, engineering
  - Jon Hellwig
  - Brett Torrence – artwork, layout
- Ian Jones – songwriter, additional producer
- Joe Lambert – mastering
- Aaron Nandor – logo
- Wil Driscoll – photography
- Roy Brady – photography
