= Draw Down the Moon =

Studio album by Foxing
- Released: August 6, 2021
- Recorded: 2020
- Genres: Indie rock; pop rock; emo
- Length: 39:48
- Label: Hopeless
- Producers: Eric Hudson; Andy Hull; John Congleton; Joe Lambert

Foxing chronology
Nearer My God (2018)	Draw Down the Moon (2021)	Foxing (2024)

Singles from Draw Down the Moon
- 1. "Speak With the Dead" Released: March 18, 2021; 2. "Go Down Together" Released: April 15, 2021; 3. "Where the Lightning Strikes Twice" Released: May 28, 2021; 4. "If I Believed in Love" Released: June 24, 2021; 5. "Draw Down the Moon" Released: July 15, 2021

Draw Down the Moon is the fourth studio album by American rock band, Foxing. The album was released on August 6, 2021 through Hopeless Records.

== Recording and production ==
The disruptions caused by the COVID-19 pandemic caused multiple difficulties for Foxing. They had planned to "road test" a handful of songs on Draw Down the Moon during a May 2020 tour with Bent Knee before the pandemic brought touring to a halt, and to make up for the lost income usually provided by touring, Murphy and guitarist Eric Hudson both began offering music lessons over Skype. Guitarist Ricky Sampson, meanwhile, left the band in October 2020, citing a desire for stability that the music industry could not provide.

== Reception ==
Professional ratings
Aggregate scores
Source	Rating
AnyDecentMusic?	7.7/10
Metacritic	80/100
Review scores
Source	Rating
Beats Per Minute	73%
DIY	4/5 stars
Exclaim!	9/10
Kerrang!	4/5
The Line of Best Fit	8/10
Paste	8.5/10
Pitchfork	6.0/10
Spectrum Culture	4/5 stars
Sputnikmusic	4.2/5
Under the Radar	8.5/10 stars

Draw Down the Moon was met with mostly positive reviews from music critics. At Metacritic, which assigns a normalized rating out of 100 to reviews from mainstream critics, Draw Down the Moon has an average score of 80 based on nine reviews. The review aggregator AnyDecentMusic? gave the album 7.7 out of 10, based on their assessment of the critical consensus.

== Track listing ==
All music is composed by Foxing.

No.	Title	Length
1.	"737"	3:55
2.	"Go Down Together"	3:15
3.	"Beacons"	3:47
4.	"Draw Down the Moon"	4:21
5.	"Where the Lightning Strikes Twice"	3:43
6.	"Bialystok"	3:52
7.	"At Least We Found the Floor"	3:01
8.	"Cold Blooded"	3:30
9.	"If I Believed in Love"	3:25
10.	"Speak with the Dead" (featuring Why?)	6:59
Total length:		39:48
