= Post to Wire =

Studio album by Heather Duby
- Released: 1999
- Studio: Less Than Obvious
- Genre: Indie rock
- Length: 56:21
- Label: Sub Pop
- Producer: Heather Duby, Steve Fisk

Heather Duby chronology
Post to Wire (1999)	Symbient (2001)

Post to Wire is the debut album by the American musician Heather Duby, released in 1999 through Sub Pop.

== Critical reception ==
Professional ratings
Review scores
Source	Rating
AllMusic	3.5/5 stars
Pitchfork Media	7.2/10

The Philadelphia Inquirer deemed the album "a minor masterpiece of vibe, a collection of disarmingly gorgeous lamentations and petulant questions, each outfitted with unusual harmonic twists."

== Track listing ==
All lyrics are written by Heather Duby; all music is composed by Heather Duby and Steve Fisk.

No.	Title	Length
1.	"Judith"	5:13
2.	"Kensington Place"	5:47
3.	"You Loved Me"	4:45
4.	"Falter"	4:14
5.	"For Jeffrey"	7:09
6.	"A Healther Fear of Monsters"	3:58
7.	"September"	5:12
8.	"Halo Sky"	8:46
9.	"Soulflower"	6:47
10.	"Amygdala"	4:30

== Personnel ==
Musicians

- Eric Akre – percussion
- Heather Duby – vocals, production
- Bo Gilliland – bass guitar
- Michael Shilling – drums
- Gary Thorstensen – guitar

Production and additional personnel

- Steve Fisk – engineering, production
- John Golden – mastering
- Sam Hofstedt – engineering
