= Omni (Minus the Bear album) =

Studio album by Minus the Bear
- Released: May 4, 2010
- Recorded: April – September 2009 at Avast!, Electrokitty
- Genres: Math rock, experimental rock, progressive rock, electronic rock
- Length: 49:41
- Label: Dangerbird
- Producers: Joe Chiccarelli, Minus The Bear

Minus the Bear chronology
Acoustics (2008)	Omni (2010)	Infinity Overhead (2012)

Omni is the fourth full-length album from Minus the Bear, released on May 4, 2010. It is their first album to be released on Dangerbird Records and was produced by Grammy Award-winner Joe Chiccarelli. On April 27, 2009, the band began recording without the support of a record label. On September 3, 2009, they announced on their Twitter that they were officially done recording.

On October 27, 2009, they self-released an EP, Into the Mirror, featuring a brand new track from the forthcoming album titled "Into the Mirror," and a B-side from the recording sessions titled "Broken China". This was released on a 7" vinyl that was sold exclusively at shows, and through various digital outlets on the internet.

In February, 2010, the band announced that they had signed to Dangerbird Records. Soon after, the title, track list, and release date of their new album was unveiled.

On April 19, 2010, the album became available for free streaming on KCRW's official site.

== Track listing ==
All lyrics are written by Jake Snider, except "The Thief" and "Animal Backwards" co-written by Alex Rose; all music is composed by Minus the Bear.

No.	Title	Length
1.	"My Time"	4:06
2.	"Summer Angel"	4:45
3.	"Secret Country"	5:31
4.	"Hold Me Down"	4:08
5.	"Excuses"	4:38
6.	"The Thief"	4:33
7.	"Into the Mirror" (Featuring Rachel Flotard)	5:11
8.	"Animal Backwards"	4:16
9.	"Dayglow Vista Rd."	5:10
10.	"Fooled by the Night"	7:23

iTunes Exclusive Pre-Order Track
No.	Title	Length
11.	"Broken China"	5:39

B-sides
No.	Title	Length
1.	"Your Private Sky" (released as track 11 on the EU International version with "Broken China" at track 12)	4:49
2.	"South Side Life"	4:06

== Recording and release ==
Professional ratings
Aggregate scores
Source	Rating
Metacritic	(65/100)
Review scores
Source	Rating
AbsolutePunk	88%
AllMusic	3.5/5 stars
The A.V. Club	C
Blare	3.5/5 stars
One Thirty BPM	55%
Paste	79/100
Pitchfork	(3.5/10)
Rock Sound	8/10 stars
Slant	3.5/5 stars
Sputnikmusic	3.5/5 stars

Omni is different from the previous Minus the Bear studio albums in that it was recorded in the style of a live show, with the band playing straight through each track rather than recording components of each track and "piecing" them together.

The album was released early for Internet streaming by KCRW, a National Public Radio affiliate based in Santa Monica, CA on April 19, 2010. Lead singer Jake Snider endorsed this release, asserting that it added energy to live shows, as fans already knew the new songs

== Personnel ==
=== Minus the Bear ===
- Jake Snider - Lead vocals, Guitar
- Dave Knudson - Guitar, Omnichord
- Erin Tate - Drums
- Cory Murchy - Bass
- Alex Rose - Keyboards, Vocals

=== Additional personnel ===
- Produced by Joe Chiccarelli and Minus The Bear
- Mixed by Joe Chiccarelli
- Mastered by Emily Lazar and Joe Laporta
- Additional recording by Jake Snider and Alex Rose
- Additional vocals on "Into The Mirror" by Rachel Flotard, courtesy of Visqueen and Local 638 Records
- Recording Assistant: Jonny Mendoza
- Assistant Engineer: Jay Follette
- Assistant Engineer: Eric Corson
- Track Editor: Lars Fox
- Drum Tech: Gregg Keplinger
- Additional Drum Tech: Phil Petrocelli
- Guitar Tech: John Stephan
- Keyboard Tech: Kurt Bujack
