= Symbient =

EP by Heather Duby
- Released: August 21, 2001
- Genre: Indie rock
- Length: 22:32
- Label: Sub Pop
- Producer: Steve Fisk, Reggie Watts

Heather Duby chronology
Post to Wire (1999)	Symbient (2001)	Come Across the River (2003)

Professional ratings
Review scores
Source	Rating
Allmusic	3/5 stars

Symbient is an EP by Heather Duby, released on August 21, 2001 through Sub Pop.

== Track listing ==
No.	Title	Length
1.	"What You Thought"	4:12
2.	"From Here to Gone"	5:00
3.	"Love You More"	4:44
4.	"Terrabyte"	4:20
5.	"Trillium"	4:16

== Personnel ==
Musicians

- Heather Duby – vocals
- Charlie Quintana – drums

Production and additional personnel

- Ed Brooks – mastering
- Steve Fisk – production, engineering, programming
- John Goodmanson – mixing
- Jesse LeDoux – design
- Reggie Watts – production
