= Planet of Ice =

Studio album by Minus the Bear
- Released: August 20, 2007
- Recorded: Robert Lang (Shoreline, Washington); Red Room Studio
- Genres: Indie rock, experimental rock, progressive rock, math rock
- Length: 48:34
- Label: Suicide Squeeze Records
- Producers: Minus the Bear, Matt Bayles

Minus the Bear chronology
Interpretaciones del Oso (2007)	Planet of Ice (2007)	Acoustics (2008)

Professional ratings
Aggregate scores
Source	Rating
Metacritic	(74/100)
Review scores
Source	Rating
AllMusic	link
The A.V. Club	A-
Kerrang!	4/5 stars
No Ripcord	8/10
Pitchfork	7.2/10 link
Relevant	link

Planet of Ice is the third full-length album from Minus the Bear, released in the UK on August 20, 2007 and in the US on August 21 by Suicide Squeeze Records. It was produced and recorded by the band's former keyboard player, Matt Bayles, in February and March 2007. It is the first Minus the Bear album to feature keyboardist Alex Rose, who replaced Matt Bayles after he left the band to concentrate on his career as a producer. It is also their last album on Suicide Squeeze Records until 2017's Voids.

== Track listing ==
No.	Title	Length
1.	"Burying Luck"	4:53
2.	"Ice Monster"	4:03
3.	"Knights"	3:38
4.	"White Mystery"	4:37
5.	"Dr. L'Ling"	6:47
6.	"Part 2"	3:50
7.	"Throwin' Shapes"	2:46
8.	"When We Escape"	4:03
9.	"Double Vision Quest"	4:27
10.	"Lotus"	8:48

iTunes Bonus Track
No.	Title	Length
11.	"Cat Calls and Ill Means"	3:39

=== Bonus CD ===
The first edition contained a Bonus CD with four tracks, two of which did not appear on Planet of Ice.

No.	Title	Length
1.	"Electric Rainbow"	3:43
2.	"Patiently Waiting"	4:15
3.	"Knights" (P.O.S. Remix)	3:34
4.	"Ice Monster" (Demo)	3:51

== Vinyl information ==
A limited run of 2000 colored records was pressed and released by Suburban Home on vinyl imprint, Vinyl Collective. High demand led to a second pressing, which included a limited edition tour pressing.

To date, there have been four official pressings of Planet of Ice on vinyl. All pressings are double LPs.

=== Test pressing ===
A test pressing of 20 copies was pressed by Suburban Home records. Copies were given to the band members, recording engineers, and management. Unique artwork was hand painted on each sleeve by Vinnie Fasano.

=== First pressing ===
- 2000 copies total, sold out prior to US release date.
1. 500 - clear with magenta splatter
2. 500 - clear with silver splatter
3. 500 - white with silver splatter
4. 500 - solid silver

=== Second pressing ===
- 1000 copies total, shipping early October 2007. Has since sold out.
1. 500 - clear with gold splatter (tour exclusive)
2. 500 - solid white

=== Third pressing ===
- 1000 copies total, made available in 2008 after second pressing sold out.
1. 500 - coke bottle blue
2. 500 - baby pink

=== Fourth pressing ===
- 1000 copies total, made available in 2010 after third pressing.
1. 500 - clear granite
2. 500 - clear with purple splash

== Personnel ==
- Jake Snider - vocals, guitar
- Dave Knudson - guitar
- Erin Tate - drums, percussion
- Cory Murchy - bass
- Alex Rose - keyboards, saxophone, vocals

== Other personnel ==
- Co-produced by Chris Common
- Engineered by Matt Bayles and Chris Common
- Additional engineering by Alex Rose and Jake Snider
- Mixed by Matt Bayles
- Mastered by Ed Brooks
- Cover Art by Ryan Blinsky
