= Ugly (Screaming Females album) =

Studio album by Screaming Females
- Released: April 3, 2012
- Genres: Indie rock, punk rock
- Length: 53:51
- Label: Don Giovanni
- Producer: Screaming Females

Screaming Females chronology
Castle Talk (2010)	Ugly (2012)	Rose Mountain (2015)

Ugly is the fifth studio album by Screaming Females, released on April 3, 2012, by Don Giovanni Records. The record was produced by the band and engineered by Steve Albini in his studio Electrical Audio. The group embarked on a national tour to support the album on April 7, 2012.

== Reception ==
Professional ratings
Aggregate scores
Source	Rating
Metacritic	83/100
Review scores
Source	Rating
AllMusic	4/5 stars
Alternative Press	3.5/5 stars
The A.V. Club	A−
Beats Per Minute	80%
The Boston Phoenix	3.5/4 stars
Chicago Tribune	3.5/4 stars
Consequence of Sound	4/5 stars
Los Angeles Times	3.5/4 stars
Paste	7.9/10
Pitchfork	8.0/10

Todd Martens from the Los Angeles Times said that the album's "tracks unfurl like mini hard-rock suites". Tyler Kane of Paste Magazine declared himself a "fan" of lead singer Marissa Paternoster's voice, as well as her "meaty, ground-covering guitar playing". In his The A.V. Club review, Jason Heller called it a "grubby, triumphant call to action". Stereogum named Ugly their Album of the Week saying "It's almost not fair for an album to have this many great songs." Pitchfork Media wrote that the album suggests the band may someday be worthy of writing about in a book such as Our Band Could Be Your Life.

The album was listed 21st on Stereogum's list of top 50 albums of 2012.

In 2026 Rolling Stone placed it at 63 on their list of The 100 Greatest Punk Albums of All Time.

== Track listing ==
All songs written by Screaming Females (Jarrett Dougherty, Mike "King Mike" Abbate, Marissa Paternoster).

1. "It All Means Nothing"
2. "Rotten Apple"
3. "Extinction"
4. "Red Hand"
5. "High"
6. "Expire"
7. "Crow's Nest"
8. "Tell Me No"
9. "Leave It All Up To Me"
10. "Doom 84"
11. "Help Me"
12. "Something Ugly"
13. "Slow Birth"
14. "It's Nice"
