= Come Across the River =

Studio album by Heather Duby
- Released: November 4, 2003
- Recorded: Less Than Obvious Recordings
- Genre: Indie rock
- Length: 38:47
- Label: Sonic Boom
- Producer: Eric Akre, Heather Duby, Steve Fisk, Bo Gilliland

Heather Duby chronology
Symbient (2001)	Come Across the River (2003)	Heather Duby (2006)

Professional ratings
Review scores
Source	Rating
Allmusic	4.5/5 stars

Come Across the River is the second album by Heather Duby, released on November 4, 2003 through Sonic Boom Recordings.

== Track listing ==
All tracks are written by Eric Akre, Heather Duby and Bo Gilliland.

No.	Title	Length
1.	"Make Me Some Insomnia"	5:06
2.	"Stamped Out"	4:00
3.	"The Rare Vavoom"	3:06
4.	"Your Blue Shoes"	3:55
5.	"Providence"	5:02
6.	"The Big Dwindle"	3:57
7.	"Coin Jar"	3:40
8.	"Three Miles"	3:32
9.	"Auto Immune"	2:21
10.	"Golden Syrup"	4:08

== Personnel ==
Musicians

- Heather Duby – vocals, keyboards, production, mixing
- Steve Fisk – keyboards, engineering, production
- Bo Gilliland – bass guitar, guitar, keyboards, mixing, production
- Lori Goldston – cello
- James W. Jr. Hampton – guitar
- Jason Parker – trumpet

Production and additional personnel

- Eric Akre – drums, production, engineering, mixing
- Ed Brooks – mastering
- Jeff Kleinsmith – design
