= Dealer (album) =

Studio album by Foxing
- Released: October 30, 2015
- Recorded: May 11, 2015–June 5, 2015
- Studio: Red Room Recordings; Seattle, WA
- Genre: Emo; indie rock; post-rock
- Length: 45:15
- Label: Triple Crown
- Producer: Matt Bayles

Foxing chronology
The Albatross (2013)	Dealer (2015)	Nearer My God (2018)

Singles from Dealer
- 1. "The Magdalene" Released: August 22, 2015; 2. "Weave" Released: September 25, 2015; 3. "Glass Coughs" Released: October 2015

Dealer is the second studio album by American rock band Foxing. The album was released on October 30, 2015 through Triple Crown Records.

== Background ==
The album was recorded from May 11 to June 5, 2015 at Red Room Recordings in Seattle. Parts of the song were also recorded at Studio Litho in Seattle and also in the band's hometown, St. Louis.

The first single, "The Magdalene", was released as a digital download and for streaming on August 22, 2015. On August 28, Triple Crown Records put the official audio of the song on their YouTube channel. In an interview with NPR, lead singer Conor Murphy described the song about losing his virginity and his perception of it being associated with being raised in the Catholic Church.

When I lost my virginity, I felt like it was less about love and more about sin. I have really never let go of or dealt with that guilt, which made it dark to write about. I think of 'The Magdalene' as a retrospective diary entry after losing my virginity.

— Conor Murphy, "Foxing's 'The Magdalene' Pulses With Devotion", NPR (August 27, 2015)

On September 25, 2015, Foxing released the second single off the album, "Weave". Writing for The Wall Street Journal, Eric Danton described the song as lush and having a textured feel. In a positive review of the track, Gabriela Tully Claymore, writing for Stereogum described the track as a majestic return for Foxing.

== Critical reception ==
Professional ratings
Aggregate scores
Source	Rating
Metacritic	76/100
Review scores
Source	Rating
AbsolutePunk	A−
Alternative Press	4/5 stars
Kerrang!	3/5 stars
Mojo	3/5 stars
Pitchfork	7.6/10

Dealer was well-received by contemporary music critics. On Metacritic, a review aggregator website, the album received an average score of 76 out of 100, indicating "general favorable reviews".

Ian Cohen, writing for Pitchfork, gave the album a 7.6 out of 10, describing Dealer as "an artistic triumph". Cohen further said that he felt Dealer was a better album than their debut album, The Albatross, saying that Dealer is "a significant advance from The Albatross, it's even heavier, more compositionally complex, and more personally revealing than its predecessor." In a rave review by the staff of AbsolutePunk there was consensus that the album would be a hallmark of emo revival comparing it to Harmlessness by The World Is A Beautiful Place And I Am No Longer Afraid To Die. The staff stated that Foxing "have set a new standard with Dealer not just for emo, but for indie and alternative rock across the board."

In a more mixed review, Tom Shepherd, writing for Kerrang!, gave the album three stars out of five.

== Track listing ==
All lyrics are written by Josh Coll and Conor Murphy; all music is composed by Foxing.

No.	Title	Length
1.	"Weave"	3:24
2.	"The Magdalene"	4:11
3.	"Night Channels"	4:17
4.	"Laundered"	4:33
5.	"Indica"	4:47
6.	"Winding Cloth"	4:32
7.	"Redwoods"	3:28
8.	"Glass Coughs"	3:38
9.	"Eiffel"	4:11
10.	"Coda"	3:18
11.	"Three on a Match"	5:06
Total length:		45:15

== Personnel ==
Foxing

- Josh Coll — Group Member
- Jon Hellwig — Group Member
- Eric Hudson — Group Member
- Conor Murphy — Group Member
- Enrique Sampson — Group Member

Production and recording

- Matt Bayles — Mixing, Producer
- Fred Feldman — A&R
- Joe Lambert — Mastering
- Ryan Wasoba — Engineer
- Juuso Westerlund — Photography
- Teagan White — Artwork, Layout, Typography

Additional musicians

- Rachel Browne — Vocals
- Lizzie Costello — Vocals
- Nouela Johnston — Vocals
- Alex Rose — Saxophone
- Hans Teuber — Clarinet
- Emma Tiemann — Cello, Viola, Violin
- Jacob Whinihan — Percussion

== Charting ==
Chart (2015)	Peak position
US Heatseekers Albums (Billboard)	4
US Independent Albums (Billboard)	24
US Top Alternative Albums (Billboard)	24
US Top Rock Albums (Billboard)	29
US Vinyl Albums (Billboard)	3
