= Voids (album) =

Studio album by Minus the Bear
- Released: March 3, 2017
- Genres: Math rock, experimental rock, progressive rock
- Length: 46:08
- Label: Suicide Squeeze,
- Producer: Sam Bell

Minus the Bear chronology
Lost Loves (2014)	Voids (2017)	Fair Enough EP (2018)

Professional ratings
Aggregate scores
Source	Rating
Metacritic	(64/100)
Review scores
Source	Rating
AllMusic	3.5/5 stars
Alternative Press	4/5 stars
Drowned In Sound	8/10
Kerrang!	3/5 stars
Rock Sound	7.8/10 stars

Voids is the sixth full-length album from Minus the Bear, released on March 3, 2017. It is their fourth full-length album to be released on Suicide Squeeze Records (and their first on the label since 2007's Planet of Ice) and was produced by Sam Bell. It is their only album recorded with drummer Kiefer Matthias, who had joined the band in 2015 to replace Erin Tate. The group disbanded in 2018 but announced a reunion in 2025.

== Track listing ==
No.	Title	Length
1.	"Last Kiss"	4:31
2.	"Give & Take"	3:42
3.	"Call the Cops"	3:40
4.	"Invisible"	3:56
5.	"What About the Boat?"	5:07
6.	"Silver"	5:53
7.	"Tame Beasts"	4:20
8.	"Erase"	5:10
9.	"Robotic Heart"	4:27
10.	"Lighthouse"	5:22

== Personnel ==
=== Minus the Bear ===
- Jake Snider - lead vocals, guitar
- Dave Knudson - guitar, bass
- Kiefer Matthias - drums, Percussion
- Cory Murchy - bass
- Alex Rose - keyboards, vocals

=== Additional personnel ===
- Produced by Sam Bell
- Mastered by Greg Calbi
