= Milk Teeth (novel) =

2018 novel by Amrita Mahale

- Author: Amrita Mahale
- Cover artist: Saurabh Garge
- Language: English
- Genre: Literary fiction
- Publisher: Westland Books
- Publication date: November 22, 2018
- Publication place: India
- Pages: 311
- ISBN: 978-9-395-07339-4

Milk Teeth is the first novel written by Indian writer Amrita Mahale, published in 2018 by Context, a subsidiary of now-defunct Westland Books. In 2019, it was shortlisted for the JCB Prize for Literature. Later that year, it was longlisted for the Crossword Book Award for Fiction.

== Plot summary ==
The novel is about childhood friends Ira Kamat and Kartik Kini living in Mumbai. It is a story of the unique dynamics that arise when responding to big changes, whether personally or communally.

== Principal characters ==
- Ira Kamat is a reporter from Asha Nivas.
- Kartik Kini is a busy management consultant.
- Kaiz Dewani is an architect and former romantic interest of Ira Kamat.
- Bipin Desai is a retired man who lives at Asha Nivas.
- Shankar Kamat & Shobha Kamat are Ira’s parents.
- Kusim Kini & Ashok Kini are Kartik’s parents.
- Professor Rajwade is a resident of Asha Nivas.

== Publication history and editions ==
Milk Teeth was published by Context, a subsidiary of the now-defunct Westland Publications. After Amazon announced it would shut down Westland Publications, the Westland Publications team partnered with Pratilipi.

Country	Date	Format	Publisher	Pages	ISBN
India	22 Nov 2018	Hardcover	Context (Westland Publications)	312	978-9387894327
India	22 Nov 2018	Paperback	Context (Westland Publications)	311	978-9387894327
India	22 Nov 2018	Kindle	Context (Westland Publications)	287	n/a
India	9 Dec 2019	Paperback	Context (Westland Publications)	328	978-9387894228
India	7 Nov 2022	Paperback	Context (Westland Publications)	324	978-9395073394
