= Screaming Females =

American rock band

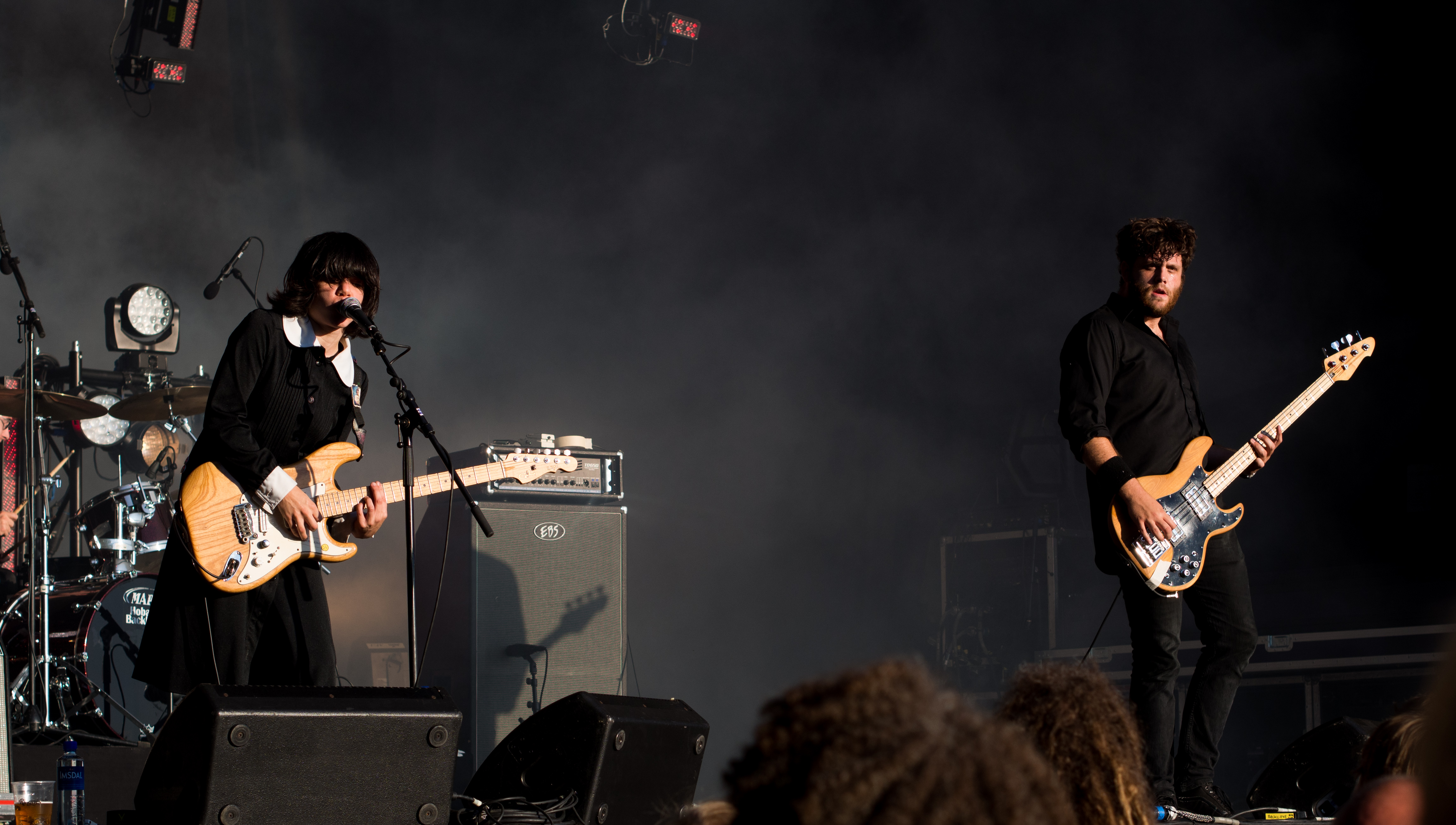
- Marissa Paternoster (left) and Mike Abbate (right), live in Oslo, Norway, August 11, 2012

Background information
- Origin: New Brunswick, New Jersey, United States
- Genres: Punk rock, indie rock, alternative rock
- Years active: 2005–2023
- Label: Don Giovanni
- Past members: Marissa Paternoster; Jarrett Dougherty; Mike Abbate
- Website: screamingfemales.com

Screaming Females was an American rock band from New Brunswick, New Jersey, comprising Marissa Paternoster on vocals and guitar, Jarrett Dougherty on drums, and Mike Abbate on bass. They released their debut album Baby Teeth in 2006. The band were featured on NPR, Last Call with Carson Daly, and MTV. They played with bands such as Garbage, Throwing Muses, Dinosaur Jr., The Dead Weather, Arctic Monkeys, Ted Leo & The Pharmacists and The Breeders.

== History ==
=== Formation ===
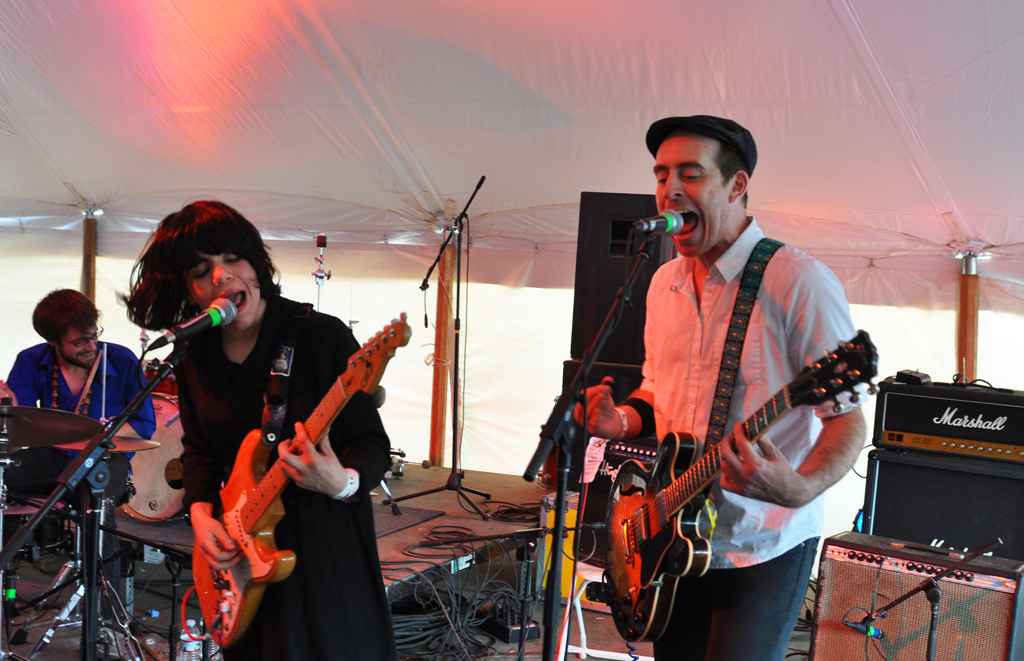
Dougherty (left) and Paternoster (center) perform with Ted Leo (right) at SXSW in March 2011

Paternoster and Abbate formed a band in high school under the name Surgery On TV. After several lineup changes they finally became a trio with Dougherty and changed the name of the band to Screaming Females. The band got their start in the basement show scene of New Brunswick, New Jersey. In the basement show scene, concerts are held in the houses of various bands, students, and residents, so people under 21 can attend. Screaming Females self-released the albums Baby Teeth in 2006 and What If Someone Is Watching Their T.V.? in 2007. The band then signed with Don Giovanni Records, which later re-released these two early albums.

=== With Don Giovanni Records ===
The band's first album for Don Giovanni Records was Power Move in 2009, followed by Castle Talk in 2010. Their fifth album, Ugly, was released in 2012 and was recorded by noted audio engineer Steve Albini. The album received favorable reviews from The A.V. Club, Chicago Tribune, the Los Angeles Times, Pitchfork Media, Alternative Press and CMJ.

In 2012, Marissa Paternoster was named the 77th greatest guitarist of all time by Spin magazine. In 2013, Screaming Females released the self-produced EP Chalk Tape for streaming online. The EP was also sold as a limited run cassette tape and in a digital download format. The band wrote the songs for Chalk Tape by laying out ideas on a chalkboard and then recording the songs with no rewrites. In September 2013, the band toured with label mates Waxahatchee and Tenement.

In early 2014, Screaming Females recorded a live record at the Hideout in Chicago. In a later interview, Paternoster described the experience: "The Hideout in Chicago is just one of those venues we really like, it's small, it's been around forever, it has a rich history, it's part of the community, it just seemed like a really good place to make a live record. Steve [Albini] drove two tape machines into the alleyway so we could record it live to tape. Like Deep Purple or something? Yeah! That's what was happening, there was a pro studio in the alleyway." The band released their sixth album Rose Mountain, produced by Matt Bayles, in February 2015. Their seventh album All at Once was released in February 2018. In 2019, a collection of singles titled Singles Too was released.

On January 17, 2023, the band released the single "Brass Bell", and announced the release of their eighth album Desire Pathway. It was released in February 2023.

On December 5, 2023, the band announced their breakup on their social media pages.

== Band members ==
- Marissa Paternoster – vocals, guitar
- Jarrett Dougherty – drums
- Mike "King Mike" Abbate – bass

== Discography ==
Studio albums

Year	Title	Label
2006	Baby Teeth	Self-released / Don Giovanni Records (reissued 2009)
2007	What if Someone is Watching Their T.V.?	Self-released / Don Giovanni Records (reissued 2009)
2009	Power Move	Don Giovanni Records
2010	Castle Talk	Don Giovanni Records
2012	Ugly	Don Giovanni Records
2015	Rose Mountain	Don Giovanni Records
2018	All at Once	Don Giovanni Records
2023	Desire Pathway	Don Giovanni Records

Compilations

Year	Title	Label
2019	Singles Too	Don Giovanni Records

Live albums

Year	Title	Label
2014	Live at the Hideout	Don Giovanni Records

Singles

Year	Title	Label	Format
2006	"Arm Over Arm/Zoo of Death"	Self-released	7"
2008	"Screaming Females/Hunchback Neil Young Tribute - Split"	Freedom School Records	7"
2008	"Screaming Females/Full of Fancy - Split"	Let's Pretend Records	7"
2009	"Screaming Females/JEFF the Brotherhood"	Infinity Cat Records	7"
2013	"Screaming Females/Garbage - Because The Night"	Stunvolume Records	10"
2013	"Screaming Females/Swearin'/Upset/Waxahatchee Guided By Voices Tribute"	Salinas Records	7"
2013	"Screaming Females/Tenement"	Recess Records	7"
2018	Shake It Off / If It Makes You Happy (aka The A.V. Club Sessions)	Don Giovanni Records	7"

EPs

Year	Title	Label
2010	Singles	Don Giovanni Records
2013	Chalk Tape	Don Giovanni Records
2022	Clover	Don Giovanni Records
