= Highly Refined Pirates =

Studio album by Minus the Bear
- Released: November 19, 2002
- Recorded: 2002 at Studio Litho
- Genres: Indie rock, math rock
- Length: 42:25
- Label: Suicide Squeeze Records
- Producer: Steve Fisk

Minus the Bear chronology
Highly Refined Pirates (2001)	Highly Refined Pirates (2002)	They Make Beer Commercials Like This (2004)

Professional ratings
Review scores
Source	Rating
AllMusic	3/5 stars
Drowned in Sound	(9/10)
Pitchfork	(5.4/10)
Punknews.org	4/5 stars

Highly Refined Pirates is the debut studio album by American indie rock band Minus the Bear. It was released on November 19, 2002, by Suicide Squeeze Records.

== Track listing ==
No.	Title	Length
1.	"Thanks for the Killer Game of Crisco® Twister"	3:35
2.	"Monkey!!! Knife!!! Fight!!!"	3:32
3.	"Absinthe Party at the Fly Honey Warehouse"	5:23
4.	"Hey, Wanna Throw Up?"	3:49
5.	"Get Me Naked 2: Electric Boogaloo"	4:09
6.	"We Are Not a Football Team"	3:02
7.	"You Kill Bugs Good, Man"	1:10
8.	"Spritz!!! Spritz!!!"	3:03
9.	"Women We Haven't Met Yet"	4:04
10.	"Damn Bugs Whacked Him, Johnny"	0:47
11.	"I Lost All My Money at the Cock Fights"	4:54
12.	"Andy Wolff"	2:08
13.	"Let's Play Guitar in a Five Guitar Band"	5:11
14.	"Booyah Achieved"	0:50

UK edition bonus tracks
No.	Title	Length
15.	"You're Some Sort of Big, Fat, Smart-Bug, Aren't You?"	1:08
16.	"Drop It Like It's Hot"	2:41

== Personnel ==
- Jake Snider - Vocals and guitar
- Dave Knudson - Guitar
- Erin Tate - Drums
- Cory Murchy - Bass
- Matt Bayles - Electronics

=== Additional personnel ===
- Produced and Engineered by Steve Fisk
- Mixed by Steve Fisk and Troy Tietjen, except 4, 7, 10, 12, and 14 mixed by Matt Bayles
- Mastered by Ed Brooks
- Additional vocals by Amy Blaschke on "Get Me Naked 2: Electric Boogaloo"

== Trivia ==
- Some of the song titles are quotes from the film Starship Troopers.
