= Zoje Stage =

American novelist

Zoje Stage is an American writer from Pittsburgh, Pennsylvania, known for her work in the performing arts and literature. She was awarded an Emerging Storytellers Fellowship from the Independent Filmmaker Project for her script "Hands and Knees" and a Fellowship in Screenwriting from the New York Foundation for the Arts in 2012 and 2008, respectively.

Her debut novel, Baby Teeth, has been optioned for film by Village Roadshow and Valparaiso Pictures.

== Bibliography ==
=== Novels ===
- Baby Teeth (2018, published in the UK as Bad Apple)
- Wonderland (2020)
- Something of a Calling (2026)
- #AuthorLife (2026, under the pen name Joe Zagets)

=== Scripts ===
- “The Machine Who Loved”
- "Hands and Knees"

== Synopses ==
- Baby Teeth (2018): This novel tells the story of Suzette and Alex, a thirty-something married couple who is trying to figure out what's wrong with their 7-year-old daughter, Hanna. Hanna has been mute since she was 3-years-old, but has recently started talking to only Suzette as Marie-Anne Dufosset, a witch who was burned at the stake. Meanwhile, Suzette is growing increasingly more scared of Hanna's violent outbursts and manipulative moments.
- Wonderland (2020): This novel is about a family of four that moves from New York to a rural farmhouse. The family starts dealing with malevolent forces in the woods outside of their home, but they're not sure if they're coming from the earth, trees, or somewhere deep in their minds.
