= Minus the Bear =

American indie rock band

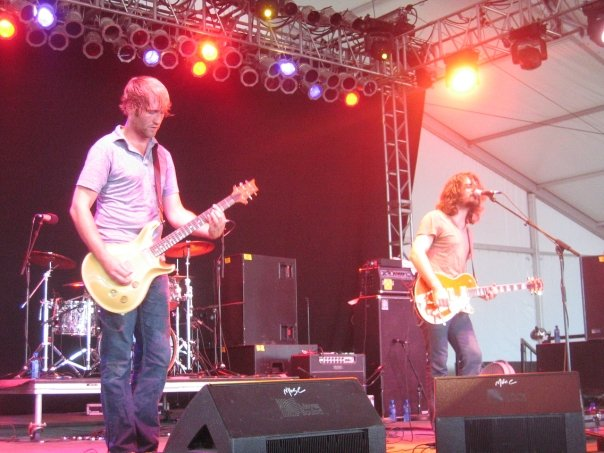
- Performing at the 2008 Bonnaroo music festival

Background information
- Origin: Seattle, Washington, US
- Genres: Indie rock, math rock, alternative rock, experimental rock, progressive rock, emo, indie emo, Midwest emo
- Years active: 2001–2018, 2025–present
- Labels: Dangerbird; MapleMusic; Suicide Squeeze; Arena Rock; Polyvinyl; Big Scary Monsters; Luckyhorse; Tigre Blanco; Albert
- Members: Jake Snider; Dave Knudson; Alex Rose; Cory Murchy; Joshua Sparks
- Past members: Matt Bayles; Erin Tate; Kiefer Matthias
- Website: minusthebear.com

Minus the Bear is an American indie rock band formed in Seattle, Washington, in 2001, and comprising members of Botch, Kill Sadie, and Sharks Keep Moving. Their sound has been described as "Pele-esque guitar-taps and electronics with sophisticated time signature composition."

Minus the Bear have released six albums and four EPs. The band's final line-up before disbanding in 2018 consisted of Jake Snider (vocals, guitar), Dave Knudson (guitar), Cory Murchy (bass guitar), and Alex Rose (synthesizers, vocals). On July 17, 2018, the band announced their retirement and accompanying farewell tour. Their final live performance on their original farewell tour was December 16, 2018, at The Showbox in Seattle.

In 2025, the band reunited and announced an anniversary tour to commemorate the 20th anniversary of Menos el Oso.

== History ==
=== 2001–2009 ===
Minus the Bear formed in 2001, and played its first gig three days after 9/11 at the Seattle venue The Paradox. Suicide Squeeze Records released their debut full-length album Highly Refined Pirates on November 19, 2002.

On January 2, 2006, Matt Bayles, keyboard player and producer for Minus the Bear, announced that he would be leaving the band to focus all his time on his career as a producer. His last performance with the band was on January 28, 2006. He was replaced by Alex Rose, who previously worked as a sound engineer on the band's second full-length album, Menos el Oso. Interpretaciones del Oso, an album of remixed songs from their second full-length album Menos el Oso, was released on February 20, 2007, by Suicide Squeeze Records.

The band's third full-length album, Planet of Ice, was released on August 21, 2007, by Suicide Squeeze Records and contains ten tracks. As well as an exclusive iTunes bonus track titled "Cat Calls & Ill Means", a bonus CD containing two B-sides, "Electric Rainbow" and "Patiently Waiting", a demo version of "Ice Monster", and a remix by P.O.S. of the album's first single, "Knights", was released with the album's first edition.

In 2008, the band recorded four tracks live on Daytrotter that were released for free with a membership to the website. Later that year, the band also released an acoustic EP, Acoustics, which contained an unreleased track, "Guns & Ammo", and acoustic versions of six previously released tracks. On October 27, 2009, the band released a two-song single, "Into The Mirror", on various digital music outlets; exclusive 7" vinyl copies were sold on tour.

=== 2010–2017 ===
On February 17, 2010, Dangerbird Records announced that it had signed Minus the Bear and that it would distribute the group's next release. A week later, it was announced that the album was titled Omni and that it was scheduled to be released on May 4, 2010. On May 8, 2010, Minus the Bear was the first band to be featured on RadioVA and was interviewed by David Lowery. On August 5, 2010, Minus the Bear opened for fellow Seattle band Soundgarden in their pre-Lollapalooza warm up show at the Vic Theatre in Chicago.

On January 9, 2012, the band began recording a fifth full-length album with producer Matt Bayles, their former keyboard player. An announcement on their Facebook page on April 30, 2012, said that the new album had been recorded and that it had been sent off for mastering. On June 21, 2012, Dangerbird Records announced this album, Infinity Overhead, would be released on August 28, 2012. On June 29, 2012, Minus the Bear announced on rollingstone.com the release of the first single from Infinity Overhead, entitled "Lonely Gun". On July 10, 2012, it was announced that Minus the Bear would be joining the Big Scary Monsters record label in the UK and that Infinity Overhead was to be released on BSM in September 2012.

On July 10, 2013, Minus the Bear announced that they would release Acoustics II, a ten-track LP with eight acoustic versions of old songs and two new tracks. An acoustic version of "Hooray" was given to everyone who pre-ordered the album.

To celebrate the tenth anniversary of the They Make Beer Commercials Like This EP, the band played two small shows in the early part of 2014 on the west coast of the US. That summer, the band announced a new full-length compilation album entitled Lost Loves. The LP was released in both vinyl and CD form and contains music which did not seem to fit in a sequential order appropriate enough, at the time, to be put on a full-length release. The tracks "Invented Memory" and "Lucky Ones" were the only tracks that were unavailable before the release of the compilation. The latter was made available before the album's release through SoundCloud and on the band's official web page. The band toured in support of the new EP and continued the celebration of their Beer Commercials LP in the second half of 2014.

On January 29, 2015, the band officially announced via its Facebook page that drummer Erin Tate was no longer a member of the band because of "personal and creative differences". The band then talked about future tours and continuing to work on the follow-up album to Infinity Overhead. The band's sixth album, VOIDS, was released on March 3, 2017.

=== Farewell Tour (2018) ===
On July 17, 2018, the band announced they would be disbanding following a farewell tour that would end on December 14 in their hometown of Seattle, and that they would be releasing a final EP, Fair Enough, in October. After tickets sold out in minutes, the band added dates on December 15 and December 16. Their final live performance was December 16, 2018 at The Showbox in Seattle.

=== Reunion ===
In March 2025, Minus the Bear announced they would embark on a reunion tour for October and November of that year, performing Menos el Oso in its entirety every night.

== Band name ==
The name "Minus the Bear" comes from an in-joke among the band members, referring to the 1970s television series B. J. and the Bear. "A friend of the band had gone on a date," explained singer-guitarist Jake Snider, "and one of us asked him afterwards how the date went. Our friend said, 'You know that TV show from the '70s, B. J. and the Bear? It was like that ... minus the Bear.' That’s the straight truth."

== Members ==
=== Current members ===
- Jake Snider – lead vocals, rhythm guitar (2001–2018, 2025–present)
- Dave Knudson – lead guitar (2001–2018, 2025–present)
- Cory Murchy – bass guitar (2001–2018, 2025–present)
- Alex Rose – keyboards, backing vocals (2006–2018, 2025–present)
- Joshua Sparks – drums (2017–2018, 2025–present)

=== Previous members ===
- Matt Bayles – keyboards (2001–2006)
- Erin Tate – drums (2001–2015)
- Kiefer Matthias – drums (2015–2017)

== Discography ==
=== Studio albums ===
Year	Album details	Peak chart positions			
Year	Album details	US Billboard 200	US Heat.	US Indie	US Alt.
2002	Highly Refined Pirates: Released: November 12, 2002; Label: Suicide Squeeze Records	—	—	—	—
2005	Menos el Oso: Released: August 23, 2005; Label: Suicide Squeeze Records	—	20	41	—
2007	Planet of Ice: Released: August 21, 2007; Label: Suicide Squeeze Records	74	—	8	22
2010	Omni: Released: May 4, 2010; Label: Dangerbird Records	49	—	9	8
2012	Infinity Overhead: Released: August 28, 2012; Label: Dangerbird Records	31	—	7	7
2017	Voids: Released: March 3, 2017; Label: Suicide Squeeze Records	109	—	7	11

=== EPs and others ===
Year	Title	Label	Other information
2001	This Is What I Know About Being Gigantic	Suicide Squeeze Records	Debut release.
2002	Bands Like It When You Yell "Yar!" at Them	Suicide Squeeze Records	Promotional CD for Highly Refined Pirates.
2004	They Make Beer Commercials Like This	Arena Rock Recording Company	Re-released in 2008 on Suicide Squeeze Records with "Houston, We Have Uh-Oh".
2005	Minus the Bear/City on Film 7" split	Polyvinyl Record Co.	Split EP featuring "This Ain't a Surfin' Movie (IQU Remix)".
2008	Acoustics	Tigre Blanco Records	Acoustic EP with "Guns & Ammo" and acoustic versions of six previously released tracks.
2009	"Into the Mirror"	Tigre Blanco Records	Single from Omni with B-side, "Broken China".
2011	"Hold Me Down"	Dangerbird Records	Single from Omni with B-side, "Broken China", including three tracks recorded live at the Dangerbird Records studios and a fan-made remix of "My Time".
2012	"Your Private Sky"/"South Side Life"	Dangerbird Records	7" vinyl released for Record Store Day that includes two Omni B-sides, "Your Private Sky" and "South Side Life".
2012	"Steel and Blood"/"Surf-N-Turf"	Big Scary Monsters	Limited 7" vinyl released for the UK leg of their 2012 Infinity Overhead Tour. Each copy is hand numbered and has a die-cut cardboard sleeve. Only 300 transparent red records were pressed.
2013	Acoustics II	Dangerbird Records	Acoustic LP with two new songs and acoustic versions of eight previously released tracks.
2014	Lost Loves	Dangerbird Records	Collection of rare and unreleased tracks.
2018	Fair Enough	Suicide Squeeze Records	"Fair Enough", "Viaduct", "Dinosaur"
2021	Farewell	Suicide Squeeze Records	Triple LP live album and digital release.

=== Remix albums ===
Year	Title	Label	Other information
2007	Interpretaciones del Oso	Suicide Squeeze Records	Menos el Oso remixed

== Music videos ==
- "The Game Needed Me" from Menos el Oso
- "Pachuca Sunrise" from Menos el Oso
- "Knights" from Planet of Ice
- "Throwin' Shapes" from Planet of Ice
- "My Time" from Omni
- "Hold Me Down" from Omni
- "Steel and Blood" from Infinity Overhead
- "Listing" from Infinity Overhead
- "Last Kiss" from VOIDS
