= Baby Teeth (Screaming Females album) =

Studio album by Screaming Females
- Released: February 17, 2006
- Genre: Indie rock, punk
- Length: 34:35
- Label: Self-released

Screaming Females chronology
Baby Teeth (2006)	What If Someone Is Watching Their T.V.? (2007)

Baby Teeth is the first studio album by Screaming Females. The band recorded it themselves and also self-released it on CD in 2006 and vinyl in early 2007.

== Track listing ==
All tracks are written by Screaming Females (Jarrett Dougherty, Mike "King Mike" Abbate, Marissa Paternoster).

No.	Title	Length
1.	"Foul Mouth"	3:59
2.	"Electric Pilgrim"	2:58
3.	"Jonah"	3:15
4.	"Angelo's Song"	3:57
5.	"The Bearded Lady"	3:06
6.	"Henry's Embryo"	3:59
7.	"Dinosaurs"	4:17
8.	"Sports"	1:57
9.	"Bus Driver Man"	3:32
10.	"Baby Jesus"	3:38

== Personnel ==
- Marissa Paternoster – vocals, guitar
- Jarrett Dougherty – drums
- Mike "King Mike" Abbate – bass
