= Foxing (band) =

American indie rock band

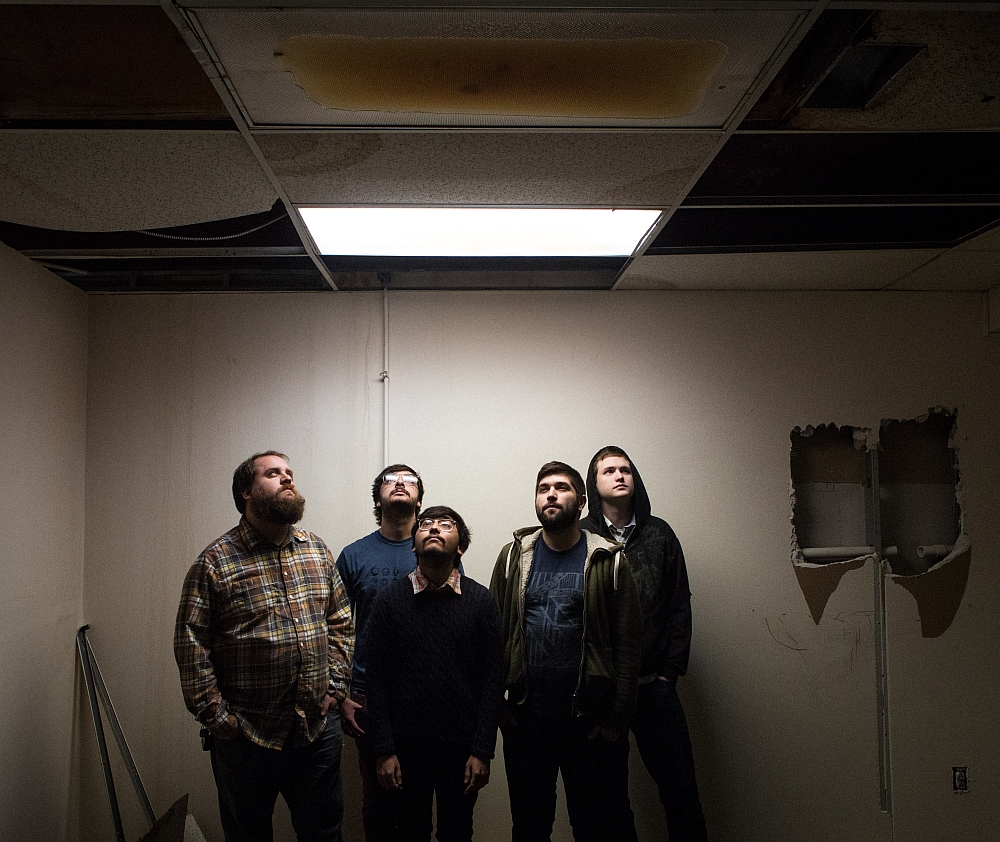
- Left to right: Hellwig, Murphy, Sampson, Coll, Hudson

Background information
- Origin: St. Louis, Missouri
- Genres: Indie rock; emo; post-rock; post-hardcore; math rock; Midwest emo
- Years active: 2011–2025 (on hiatus)
- Labels: Carucage, Count Your Lucky Stars, Triple Crown, Hopeless
- Spinoff of: Hunter Gatherer
- Members: Conor Murphy; Jon Hellwig; Eric Hudson; Brett Torrence
- Past members: Josh Coll; Ricky Sampson
- Website: foxingtheband.com

Foxing is an American indie rock band from St. Louis, Missouri. The band has released five studio albums, a live album, an EP and 14 singles.

== History ==
Foxing began in 2011 following the end of the group Hunter Gatherer, a post-rock band active from 2008 to 2010 that featured Josh Coll, Jon Hellwig and Matthew Piva. The initial lineup of the band shortly expanded to include Conor Murphy, who was then the bassist of the then active emo group Family Might and formerly the vocalist of the indie/post-rock band Torchlight Red. It also included guitarist Ben Helman of the melodic post-punk band Eagle Scout. In late 2011, Helman left the group, and Jim Fitzpatrick of Falsetto Boy and Muscle Brain took his place. During their formation period, the band had briefly considered naming themselves She Hums in Swarms before permanently settling on the name Foxing in October 2011.

In January 2012, the band proceeded to record the Old Songs EP. Foxing's lineup changed again with the replacement of guitarists Piva and Fitzpatrick with Samuel Naumann of Torchlight Red in March 2012 and Ricky Sampson of the emo/math-rock group Badgerhunt in April. Naumann soon departed the band in May 2012, and Thomas Pini, who was the lead vocalist and guitarist of Family Might, filled his place. Foxing released the previously recorded "Old Songs" in August 2012. In February 2013, Foxing released a split with Send Away Stranger on the Saint Louis-based DIY label Carucage Records and another split with Japanese Breakfast. That same month, Pini left the group to be succeeded by Eric Hudson of Torchlight Red, Family Might, and Jimshorts. In March 2013, Foxing embarked on their first tour through the Midwest, within which they were signed to Count Your Lucky Stars Records on the final night

Foxing released their debut album, The Albatross, in November 2013 through Count Your Lucky Stars Records. In 2014, they signed to Triple Crown Records. Triple Crown released a remastered version in May. In spring of 2014, alongside Adventures, Foxing supported Seahaven on their spring tour. Also in 2014, Foxing embarked on a summer headlining tour alongside the Hotelier.

In October 2014, Foxing supported Brand New on their fall headlining tour, which saw Foxing playing in the largest venues of its career up to that point. Vocalist Conor Murphy credited Brand New lead singer Jesse Lacey for a pivotal motivational speech he gave to the band right before they were set to take the stage on the first tour date. "Right when Jesse said that, something just clicked for us... from that moment on, it became the easiest thing in the world and the most fun thing that we could possibly do," Murphy said.

This was immediately followed by a supporting stint opening for Modern Baseball on their fall headlining tour. In summer 2015, they were a part of the tour supporting Philadelphia band mewithoutYou. Also in the summer, The Albatross was released in the UK. On August 3, it was announced that the band's second album, Dealer, would be released in the fall through Triple Crown. Dealer reached number three on the Billboard Vinyl Albums chart. Triple Crown released a promotional song from the album on their official SoundCloud channel, titled "The Magdalene".

On July 3, 2015, the band's trailer was stolen along with $30,000 worth of musical equipment after a show in Austin, Texas. In addition to the entirety of the band's equipment, the trailer also contained all of the band's merchandise, personal items and equipment belonging to the tour's opening band Lithuania. The band was forced to cancel several shows, but still managed to play select dates using borrowed equipment. Afterward, Foxing headed on a co-headline tour that winter along with The World Is a Beautiful Place & I Am No Longer Afraid to Die. The theft occurred despite a concerted effort by the band to prevent their equipment from being stolen. Coll said,

We have three top-of-the-line locks on our trailer [...] we broke a key inside of one of these locks a while ago, and it took us four days to find somebody who could get it open. We saw some of the rubber casings from those locks on the ground, so we know they tried to get in that way. We also have the trailer hard-locked to the hitch, and they popped that lock. They must have lifted it.. which is insane.. and moved it to their vehicle to drive it off.

In March and April 2016, the band went on a headline tour of the United States with support from Lymbyc Systym, O'Brother & Tancred. Immediately afterward, they embarked on their first headlining tour of the UK and Europe with support from TTNG. This tour included dates in Copenhagen, Denmark and Reykjavik, Iceland (with 2016 Phonofile Nordic Music Prize nominee, Teitur Magnússon). Foxing toured with Balance & Composure in October and November 2016.

Foxing has made festival appearances at Shaky Knees, Bunbury, Wrecking Ball, Pygmalion among others.

On December 7, 2017, founding member and bass guitarist Josh Coll announced that he was leaving the band to pursue a career in filmmaking.

On June 18, 2018, Foxing announced their third studio album, Nearer My God, which was released on August 10 through Triple Crown Records. They also released a music video for the lead single "Slapstick", directed by Coll.

On September 30, 2020, guitarist Ricky Sampson announced that he was leaving the band.

Following the release of the two singles "Speak with the Dead" and "Go Down Together" on March 18, 2021, and April 15, 2021, respectively, on May 27, 2021, Foxing announced their fourth album Draw Down the Moon, with the release of the single "Where the Lightning Strikes Twice". The lead-up to the album's release was teased by the band on the website DrawDownTheMoon.org. On June 24, 2021, the band released the fourth single "If I Believed in Love", followed by the release of the title track on July 15, 2021. The album released on August 6, 2021.

On July 8, 2022, Foxing released their first live album Live at the Grandel exclusively on vinyl. The record was limited to 1,000 copies. A week later the band released a video of the same live performance.

On July 31, 2024, Foxing announced their self-titled fifth studio album would be released September 13 through a mock press conference video.

After the last show on a U.S. tour with Coheed and Cambria and Taking Back Sunday, Foxing announced an indefinite hiatus on September 22, 2025. The hiatus officially started in December 2025 after an initial announcement of two final shows was expanded to four in Chicago and St. Louis.

== Style ==
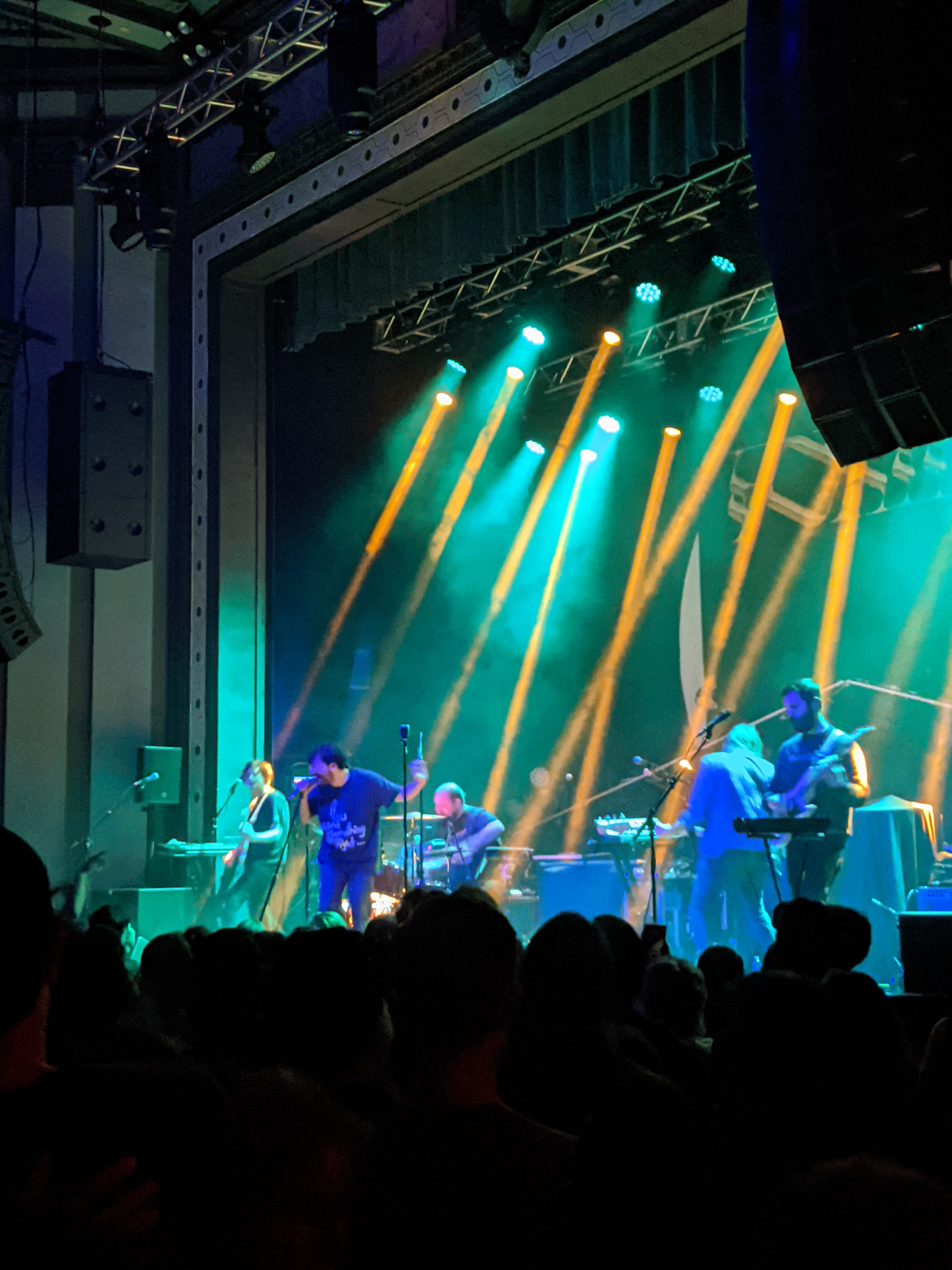
Foxing performing in March 2022

Foxing have been described as indie rock and post-rock. The Albatross has been described as chamber rock, emo, indie rock, math rock, and post-rock, reminiscent of American Football, Dads, Empire! Empire! (I Was a Lonely Estate), and The World Is a Beautiful Place & I Am No Longer Afraid to Die. Dealer has been described as emo, indie rock and post-rock.

== Awards ==
Dealer was ranked at number 2 on AbsolutePunk's top albums of 2015 list. The album was included in TheWaster's top albums of 2015 list.

In 2019, BrooklynVegan ranked Dealer at number 32 and Nearer My God at number 2 in their list of the top punk and emo albums of the 2010s.

== Members ==
=== Current members ===
- Conor Murphy – lead vocals, guitar, trumpet, sampler (2011–Present)
- Jon Hellwig – drums, sampler (2011–Present)
- Eric Hudson – guitar, backing vocals (2013–Present)
- Brett Torrence – bass, synthesizer, sampler (2018–Present)

Current touring musicians

- Emma Tiemann – violin, keyboards (2015–present)
- Carolyn Haynes – guitar, strings, keyboards, saxophone (2019–present)

=== Former members ===
- Ben Helman – guitar (2011)
- Matthew Piva – guitar (2011–2012)
- Jim Fitzpatrick – guitar, backing vocals (2011–2012)
- Samuel Naumann – guitar (2012)
- Thomas Pini – guitar (2012–2013)
- Josh Coll – bass, synthesizer, sampler (2011–2017)
- Ricky Sampson – guitar, sampler (2012–2020)

== Discography ==
Studio albums

- The Albatross (November 12, 2013)
- Dealer (October 30, 2015)
- Nearer My God (August 10, 2018)
- Draw Down the Moon (August 6, 2021)
- Foxing (September 13, 2024)

Live albums

- Live at the Grandel (July 8, 2022)

Extended plays

- Old Songs (August 19, 2012)

Splits

- Foxing/Send Away Stranger (2013)
- Foxing/Japanese Breakfast (2013)

Singles

- "Rory" (2013)
- "The Magdalene" (August 22, 2015)
- "Weave" (September 25, 2015)
- "Glass Coughs" (2015)
- "Slapstick" (June 18, 2018)
- "Nearer My God" (July 19, 2018)
- "Gameshark" (August 1, 2018)
- "Speak with the Dead" (March 18, 2021)
- "Go Down Together" (April 15, 2021)
- "Where the Lightning Strikes Twice" (May 27, 2021)
- "If I Believed in Love" (June 24, 2021)
- "Draw Down the Moon" (July 15, 2021)
- "Greyhound" (August 1, 2024)
- "Hell 99" (August 21, 2024)
