= Menos el Oso =

Studio album by Minus the Bear
- Released: August 23, 2005
- Recorded: Studio Litho, The Bat Cave, Aquahaus
- Genres: Indie rock, math rock, experimental rock
- Length: 44:47
- Label: Suicide Squeeze Records
- Producers: Minus The Bear, Matt Bayles

Minus the Bear chronology
They Make Beer Commercials Like This (2004)	Menos el Oso (2005)	Interpretaciones del Oso (Menos el Oso Remixes) (2007)

Professional ratings
Aggregate scores
Source	Rating
Metacritic	74/100
Review scores
Source	Rating
AbsolutePunk	93% link
AllMusic	link
Pitchfork	7.1/10 link
Tiny Mix Tapes	1.5/5 stars

Menos el Oso is the second studio album from Minus the Bear and was released on August 23, 2005 by Suicide Squeeze Records. The album title is a Spanish translation of "Minus the Bear."

== Track listing ==
No.	Title	Length
1.	"The Game Needed Me"	3:15
2.	"Memphis & 53rd"	3:40
3.	"Drilling"	5:03
4.	"The Fix"	3:31
5.	"El Torrente"	4:56
6.	"Pachuca Sunrise"	3:35
7.	"Michio's Death Drive"	3:35
8.	"Hooray"	4:17
9.	"Fulfill the Dream"	3:23
10.	"The Pig War"	4:38
11.	"This Ain't a Surfin' Movie"	4:53

Bonus track
No.	Title	Length
12.	"This Ain't a Surfin' Movie" (IQU Remix)	4:36

== Personnel ==
- Jake Snider - Vocals & Guitar
- Dave Knudson - Guitar
- Erin Tate - Drums
- Cory Murchy - Bass
- Matt Bayles - Electronics
- James SK Wān - Bamboo Flute

=== Production ===
- Additional production by Chris Common
- Engineered by Matt Bayles, Chris Common, and Jake Snider
- Additional engineering by Alex Rose
- Mixed by Matt Bayles
- Mastered by Ed Brooks
