= Jake Snider =

American musician (born 1976)

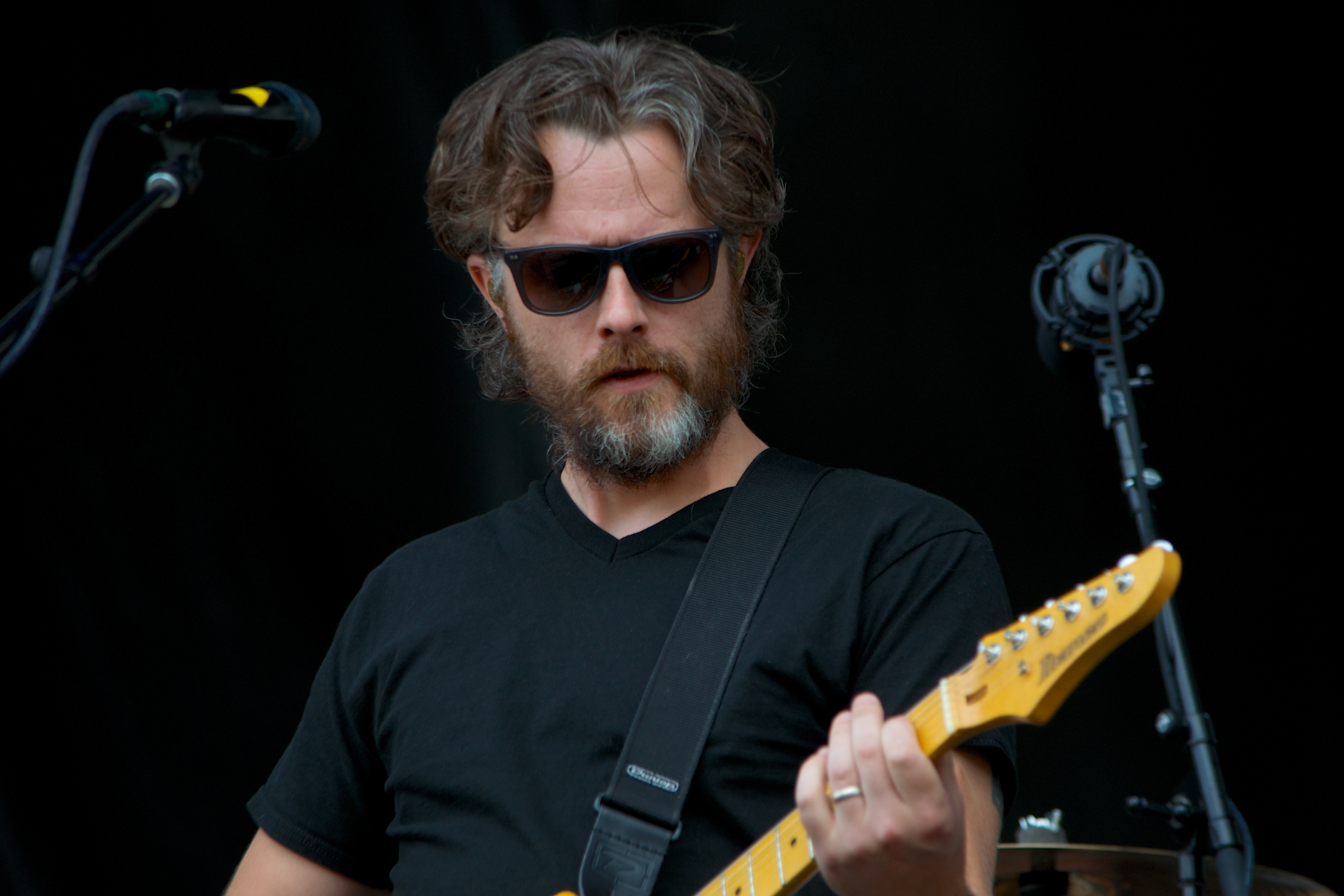
- Snider performing with Minus the Bear in 2014

Background information
- Born: March 22, 1976 (age 50)
- Origin: Seattle, Washington, U.S.
- Genres: Indie rock, experimental rock
- Instruments: Guitar, vocals
- Years active: 1994–present
- Label: Suicide Squeeze

Jake Snider (born March 22, 1976) is the lead vocalist and guitarist in the band Minus the Bear. He also plays guitar in the band Onalaska. He has previously been a part of the bands Sharks Keep Moving and State Route 522. He also plays guitar in the instrumental rock band The Jjen along with Justin Tamminga of Assertion.

== Discography ==
- State Route 522 7" - State Route 522 (1994, Henry's Finest Recordings)
- The Excursion Compilation - State Route 522 (1995, Excursion Records)
- Forecast Compilation - State Route 522 (1996, Excursion Records)
- State Route 522/Lying On Loot Split 7" - State Route 522 (1996, Excursion Records)
- Samson is Apollo - State Route 522 (EP 1997, Henry's Finest Recordings & Excursion Records)
- Sharks Keep Moving/The Kentucky Pistol 7" split - Sharks Keep Moving (1997, Henry's Finest Recordings)
- Desert Strings and Drifters - Sharks Keep Moving (EP 1998, Second Nature Recordings)
- Full Length album - Sharks Keep Moving (1999, Status Recordings)
- Retrospective - State Route 522 (2001, Status Recordings)
- Pause and Clause - Sharks Keep Moving (2002, Status Recordings)
- This Is What I Know About Being Gigantic - Minus the Bear (EP 2001, Suicide Squeeze Records)
- Bands Like It When You Yell "Yar!" at Them - Minus the Bear (EP 2002, Suicide Squeeze Records)
- To Sing For Nights - Onalaska (2002, Dim Mak Records)
- Highly Refined Pirates - Minus the Bear (2002, Suicide Squeeze Records)
- They Make Beer Commercials Like This - Minus the Bear (EP 2004, Arena Rock Recording Co.)
- Menos el Oso - Minus the Bear (2005, Suicide Squeeze Records)
- Planet of Ice - Minus the Bear (2007), Suicide Squeeze Records
- You and the Fishermen - Onalaska (2007)
- Acoustics - Minus the Bear (2008)
- Omni - Minus The Bear (2010, Dangerbird Records)
- Infinity Overhead - Minus The Bear (2012, Dangerbird Records)
- Acoustics II - Minus The Bear (2013, Tigre Blanco Records)
- Voids - Minus The Bear (2017, Suicide Squeeze Records)
- Fair Enough EP - Minus The Bear (2018, Suicide Squeeze Records)
