= Marissa Paternoster =

American rock musician

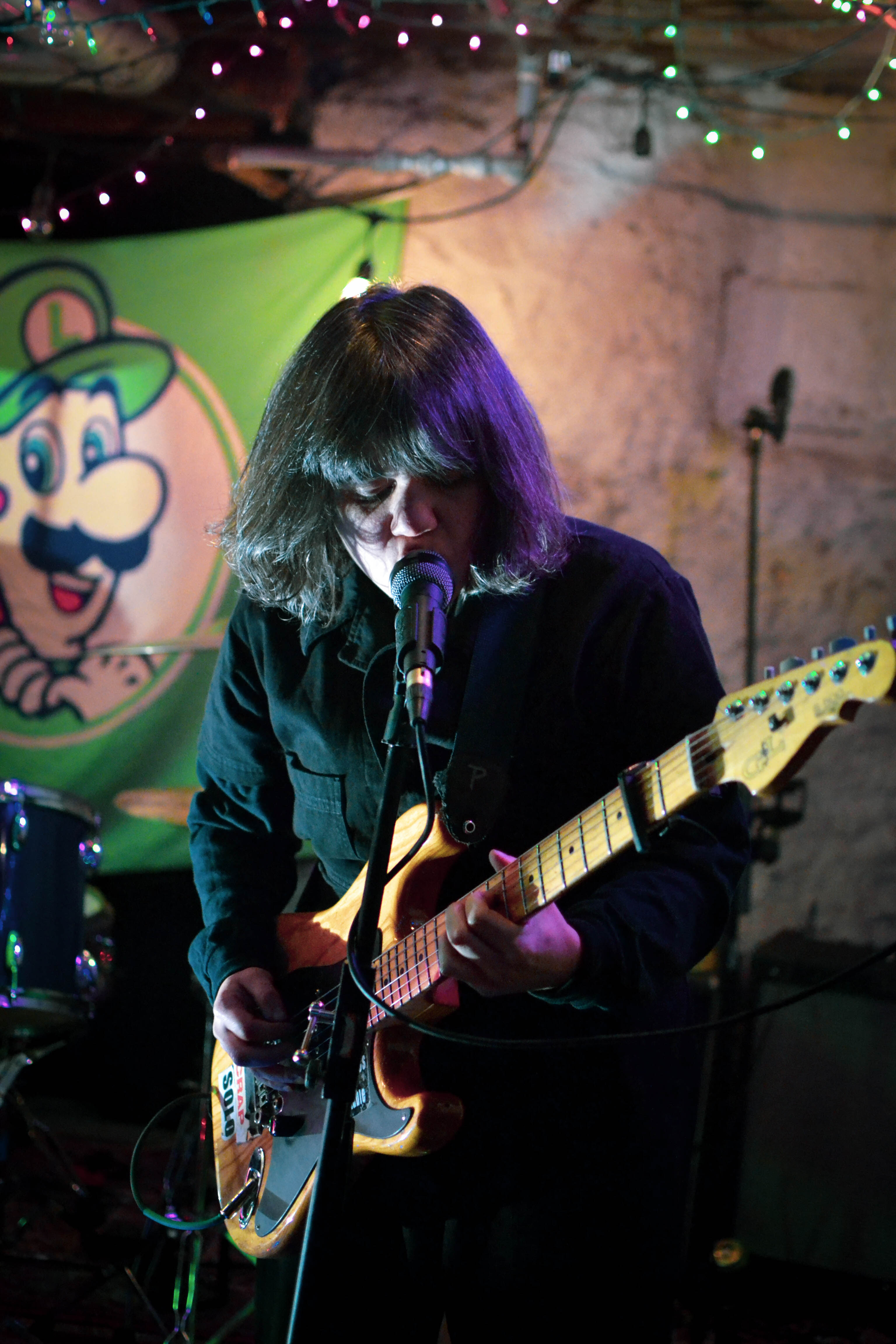
- Paternoster performing in 2025

Background information
- Born: August 1, 1986 (age 40)
- Origin: Elizabeth, New Jersey, U.S.
- Genres: Punk rock, indie rock
- Occupations: Musician, artist
- Instruments: Vocals, guitar
- Years active: 2004–present
- Label: Don Giovanni Records
- Member of: Screaming Females, Noun

Marissa Paternoster (born August 1, 1986) is an American artist, singer and guitarist active in New Jersey's New Brunswick music scene. She is the former lead singer and guitarist of the band Screaming Females, and continues to perform in the solo project Noun.

== Early life ==
Paternoster's parents met while both teachers for the Elizabeth Public Schools. Her mother, Leslie Okun, who Paternoster has described as "culturally Jewish", was an art teacher who now resides in Florida. Her father, Angelo Paternoster, gave her her first guitar lessons before she taught herself to play as a teen. Paternoster grew up in Elizabeth, New Jersey and attended Roselle Catholic High School and later Rutgers University's Mason Gross School of the Arts, where she became interested in music and formed Screaming Females. An only child and an introvert, she grew up with a passion for comics, drawing, and, before long, guitar.

== Music ==
Sleater-Kinney influenced her to start a band with bassist Mike Abbate and drummer Jarrett Dougherty in 2005. She was named the 77th greatest guitarist of all time by Spin magazine in 2012, and the 150th greatest guitarist of all time by Rolling Stone in 2023.

== Artwork and writing ==
Marissa's art is included on album covers, posters, skateboard graphics, murals, and advertisements. Marissa's art has been shown in galleries including Space 1026 and Commonweal Gallery. She has published collections of her artwork through Don Giovanni Records.

In 2024 she released her first graphic novel Merriment illustrated by her and written by Joe Steinhardt.

== Personal life ==
Paternoster is an out lesbian and has spoken about how bands like Sleater-Kinney gave her the confidence to be a queer woman in music. Her go-to karaoke song is Meat Loaf's "Paradise by the Dashboard Light".

== Discography ==
=== With Screaming Females ===
- Screaming Females discography

=== As Noun ===
- Peace Meter (2021) (originally released under Marissa Paternoster)
- In the Shade (2021)
- 3-Song Picture Disc (2020)
- Slug (2018)
- Throw Your Body On The Gears And Stop The Machine With Your Blood (2015)
- Holy Hell (2010)
- Noun (2010)
- Forgotten Grin (2007)

=== Guest Appearances ===
- w/The HIRS Collective, Unicorn Tapestry Woven in Fire, vocals (2023)
- w/Street Eaters, Love Like Anthrax (Gang of Four cover), vocals and guitar (2021)
- w/Modern Hut, I Don't Want to Get Adjusted to This World, vocals and guitar (2021)
- w/Shellshag, Keep Your Eyes on the Road, vocals (2021)
- w/Snakeskin, Heart Orb Bone, guitar (2021)
- w/Secretary Legs, Cool Myths, guitar (2021)
- w/Iron Reagan, Eat Or Be Eaten, guitar (2018)
- w/Modern Hut, Generic Treasure, guitar and vocals (2013)
