= Matt Bayles =

American record producer

- Origin: Seattle, Washington, U.S.
- Genres: Indie rock
- Occupations: Producer, engineer, mixer, musician
- Instruments: Keyboard, synthesizer, guitar
- Years active: 1995–present
- Formerly of: Minus the Bear, Dust Moth
- Website: mattbayles.com

Matt Bayles is an American record producer and audio engineer based in Seattle.

== Career ==
Bayles' career began with interning in Nashville, Tennessee. Eventually moving on to engineering country demo sessions with session musician, Bayles learned the ropes of the recording studio. After deciding Nashville wasn't the place to land, Bayles moved to Seattle, Washington.

Bayles began working with at Studio Litho in 1995, assisting Brendan O'Brien, Adam Kasper, and Terry Date among other. Working with O”Brien on Pearl Jam's No Code and Yield, and Date on Deftones' Around The Fur and Kasper on Soundgarden”s Down On The Upside.

Bayles produced and engineered the Grammy nominated Blood Mountain by Mastodon, which was one of the most critically acclaimed albums of 2006, ranking at 9th in Rolling Stone's Top 50 Albums of 2006. More recently, Bayles has worked with St. Louis indie rock band Foxing, handling the production and mixing of their 2015 LP, Dealer.

== Selected discography ==
p – produced, m – mixed, e – engineered, a – assistant

- A Wilhelm Scream – A Wilhelm Scream (m)
- Botch – American Nervoso (p/m/e)
- Botch – We Are the Romans (m/e)
- Botch – An Anthology of Dead Ends (c-p/m/e)
- Caspian – Waking Season (c-p/m/e)
- Caspian – Hymn for the Greatest Generation (p/m/e)
- Caspian – Dust & Disquiet (c-p/m/e)
- Cursive – I Am Gemini (p)
- Deftones – Around the Fur (a)
- Foxing – Dealer (p/m)
- Isis – Celestial (p/m/e)
- Isis – SGNL>05 (p/m/e)
- Isis – Oceanic (p/m/e)
- Isis – Panopticon (p/m/e)
- Isis – In the Absence of Truth (p/m/e)
- KEN mode – Entrench (p)
- Make Do and Mend – End Measure Mile (m)
- Make Do and Mend – Everything You Ever Loved (p/m/e)
- Mastodon – Remission (p/m/e)
- Mastodon – Leviathan (p/m/e)
- Mastodon – Blood Mountain (p/e)
- Minus The Bear – They Make Beer Commercials Like This (p/m/e)
- Minus the Bear – Menos El Oso (p/m/e)
- Minus the Bear – Planet of Ice (p/m/e)
- Minus the Bear – Infinity Overhead (p w/ band)
- Murder City Devils – Thelema (p/m/e)
- Norma Jean – O God, the Aftermath (p/m/e)
- Norma Jean – Masters of Horror (Soundtrack) (p/m/e "ShaunLuu")
- Pearl Jam – Yield (e "Do the Evolution" & "All Those Yesterdays")
- Pearl Jam – Binaural (e)
- Pearl Jam – Lost Dogs (m)
- Polar Bear Club – Chasing Hamburg (p/m/e)
- Screaming Females – Rose Mountain (c-p)
- Soundgarden – The Classic Album Selection (e)
- The Blood Brothers – This Adultery Is Ripe (p/m/e)
- The Blood Brothers – March On Electric Children (p/m/e)
- The Fall of Troy – Manipulator (p/m/e)
- The Sword – Warp Riders (p/m/e)
- These Arms Are Snakes – This Is Meant to Hurt You (p/m/e)
- These Arms Are Snakes – Oxeneers or The Lions Sleeps When It's Antelope Go Home (p/m/e)
- Vanna – Curses (p/m/e)
