= Dave Knudson (guitarist) =

- Dave in concert.

Background information
- Born: October 13, 1976 (age 49)
- Origin: Seattle, Washington, U.S.
- Genres: Indie rock, Mathcore (early), Metalcore (early)
- Occupations: Guitarist, songwriter
- Instrument: Guitar
- Years active: 1993–present
- Member of: Minus the Bear
- Formerly of: Botch

David Knudson (born October 13, 1976) is an American guitarist and founding member of Seattle based indie band Minus the Bear, as well as mathcore band Botch. Other credits include additional guitars on These Arms Are Snakes' album Oxeneers or The Lion Sleeps When Its Antelope Go Home. Since the breakup of Minus The Bear, Knudson has been working on solo material; his debut solo album, The Only Thing You Have to Change is Everything, was released on May 13, 2022.

== Discography ==
Solo

- The Only Thing You Have to Change is Everything (2022)

with Botch

- American Nervoso (1998)
- We Are the Romans (1999)

with Minus the Bear

- Highly Refined Pirates (2002)
- Menos el Oso (2005)
- Planet of Ice (2007)
- Omni (2010)
- Infinity Overhead (2012)
- Voids (2017)

with These Arms Are Snakes

- Oxeneers or the Lion Sleeps When Its Antelope Go Home (2004)

== Equipment ==
- Guitars
  - PRS McCarty guitar with two humbuckers (as seen in the above photo.)
  - PRS Custom 24 with trem/two humbuckers. Seen on the Omni tour.
  - Fender Jaguar Special HH Baritone Guitar. Used on Secret Country live
  - First Act Delia 22 fret guitar with two humbuckers.
  - Gibson Les Paul Classic Custom silverburst edition electric guitar.
  - PRS DGT, black with maple trim. Used on Fall '08 tour.
- Amplifiers:
  - Mesa Boogie Lonestar with custom white Tolex through a Mesa Boogie 2X12" extension cabinet
  - Fender Twin Reverb (used as rental abroad)
  - both amps are now used in conjunction in Knudson's Rig.
- Effects pedals:
  - 4 × Line 6 DL-4s (Knudson also keeps three additional DL-4s as backups, and there are 8 on stage in total between Dave, Jake, and Cory. He will use the sampling abilities of multiple DL-4s at once. Examples are aplenty on Planet of Ice)
  - Strymon Timeline Delay
  - Enema FX Mingebox (custom made fuzz and octave effect)
  - Ibanez TS9 Tube Screamer
  - Fulltone OCD overdrive (used for the recording of Planet of Ice in place of the Tubescreamer, though not on tour)
  - Digitech Whammy
  - BOSS RC-3 Loop Station (added in 2007)
  - BOSS DD-20 Giga Delay
  - BOSS GE-7 EQ
  - BOSS CS-3 compressor
  - Barber Tone Press compressor
  - FMR Really Nice compressor (no longer used live.)
  - Electro-Harmonix HOG Guitar Synthesizer with foot controller (added in 2007, can be heard on "Burying Luck".)
  - Dunlop Cry Baby
- Misc
  - Suzuki Omnichord (The Minus the Bear album "Omni" is named after this instrument.)

== Technique ==
Dave Knudson demonstrating his tapping technique.

Dave Knudson is well known for his use of two-handed tapping. He uses this technique to create polyphony (countermelodies), whereby his right hand will tap a treble melody, whilst his left hand plays a bass accompaniment. This technique is most apparent on the album Highly Refined Pirates, where it is used on every single song (except the electronic interludes.) Dave is also known for his use of the Line 6 DL-4 delay modeller's sampler capability. The DL-4 can be used to record a phrase which can then be played back instantly by stepping on one of the DL-4's buttons. The sample can also be reversed, slowed down or sped up, effects which Dave makes use of both in the studio (notably on Menos El Oso), but can also be replicated live. Dave can often be heard recording and preparing the samples before the start of songs when playing live.

== Graphic design ==
On top of playing and touring with Minus the Bear, Dave has also designed the artwork for the band's releases and the majority of apparel, as well as artwork for other bands such as Pretty Girls Make Graves.
