= Erin Tate =

American drummer

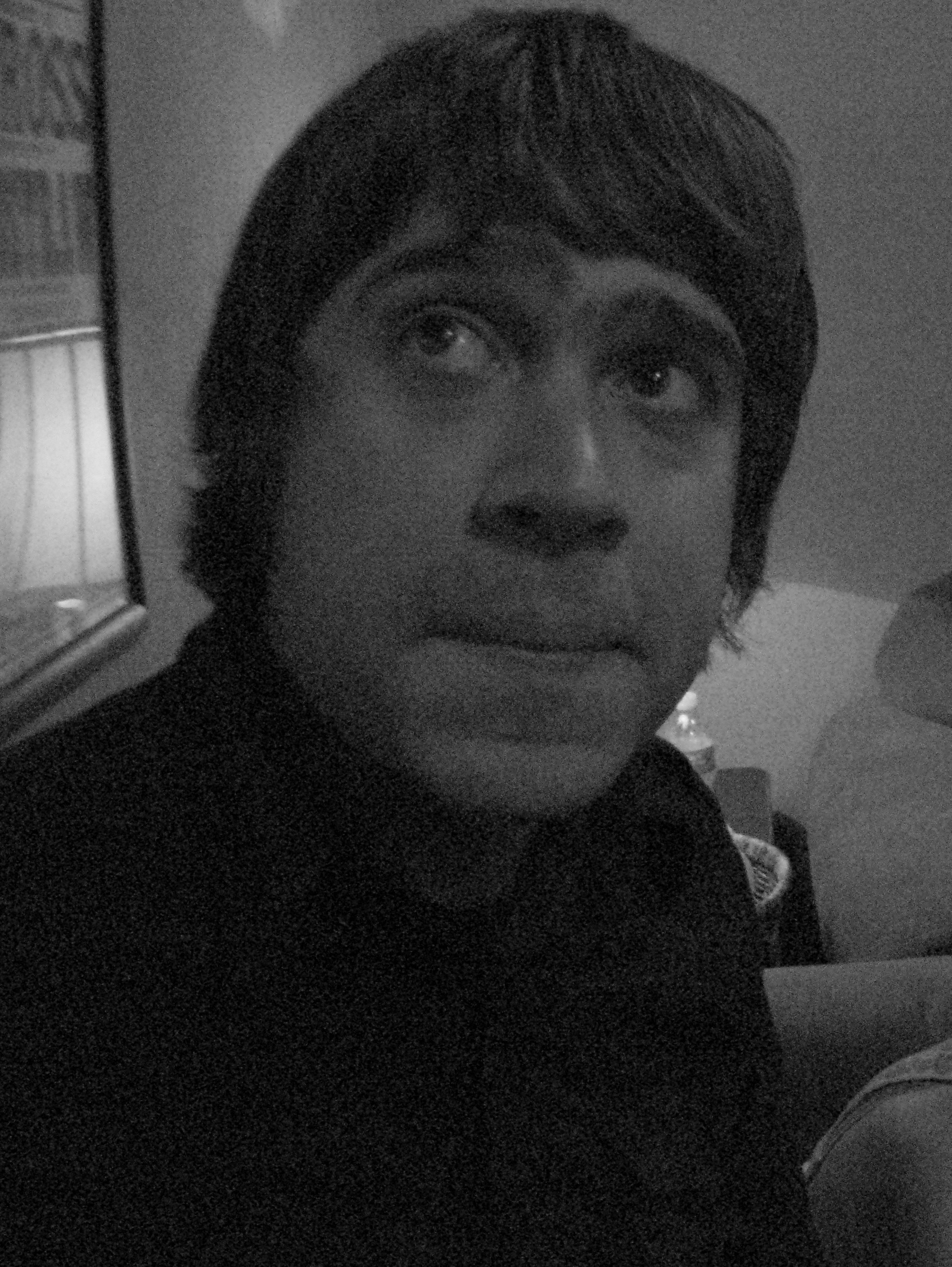
Erin Tate in 2009

Erin Tate is the former drummer of Seattle-based indie rock band Minus the Bear and Hand of the Hills, a side project started with David Totten (The Quiet Ones, Scriptures) and Matt Benham (Black Swedes). Before starting Minus the Bear in 2001, he was a member of Kill Sadie. He has also played drums for Askeleton, Amy Blaschke, Heather Duby, Onalaska, These Arms Are Snakes, and Shampoop.
