= Botch (band) =

American mathcore band

- A promotional image of Botch performing live with work lamps aimed at the audience. Vocalist Dave Verellen is on the left, guitarist Dave Knudson is on the right.

Background information
- Origin: Tacoma, Washington, U.S.
- Genres: Metalcore; mathcore
- Years active: 1993–2002; 2022–2024
- Labels: Hydra Head; Sargent House
- Spinoffs: Minus the Bear; Roy; These Arms Are Snakes
- Members: Brian Cook; Dave Knudson; Tim Latona; Dave Verellen

Botch was an American mathcore band formed in 1993 in Tacoma, Washington. The band, featuring Brian Cook, Dave Knudson, Tim Latona and Dave Verellen, spent four years as a garage band and released several demos and EPs before signing to Hydra Head Records. Through the label, Botch released two studio albums: American Nervoso (1998) and We Are the Romans (1999). The group toured extensively and internationally in support of their albums with like-minded bands such as The Blood Brothers, The Dillinger Escape Plan, Ink & Dagger and Jesuit. Botch struggled to write a third studio album, and in 2002 the group broke up due to tensions among the band members and creative differences. Hydra Head posthumously released an EP of songs the group had been working on before they split titled An Anthology of Dead Ends and a live album documenting their final show titled 061502 in 2006.

After Botch broke up, most of the members went on to form or join new bands in the Seattle/Tacoma area including: Minus the Bear, Narrows, Roy, Russian Circles and These Arms Are Snakes.

== History ==
=== Early years (1993–1997) ===
Bassist Brian Cook, guitarist Dave Knudson, drummer Tim Latona and vocalist Dave Verellen formed Botch in 1993 while they were all still in high school. Tim Latona, who at the time was a jazz drummer considering attending the performing arts school Juilliard, was approached by Dave Knudson in the high school cafeteria and asked if he would like to start a rock band. According to Knudson, "We were probably 16 or 17. I brought my amp over to Tim's house, and we ended up on his back deck playing Helmet covers for a couple of hours." Dave Knudson enticed Brian Cook to join the band by promising that the group would record a Dead Kennedys cover, but this recording never took place. Dave Verellen was the last to join the band, and only became the vocalist because he couldn't play an instrument. The group selected the name Botch simply by "opening a dictionary."

Early songs written by Botch were described by Knudson as, "some of the worst music you've probably heard in your life," which he attributed to each of the members' differing tastes in music and the lack of experience in composing songs. Some of their early song titles included: "Barney the Purple Dinosaur," "Vegetarianism Is Anarchy," "Barbed Rectal Thermometer" and "Pudenda."

Botch released Faction, a 7-inch EP in 1995; that same year, Botch went on their first tour outside of the Seattle-area. Dave Verellen's dad drove the group on a mini-tour through Canada in an old van he owned. John Pettibone, then of Undertow and Nineironspitfire, praised Botch's ability to tour outside of their hometown, commenting: "Botch was the first band from the next generation that went out and pushed it—and pushed it their way. It was remarkable." In 1996, the band released another EP, titled The John Birch Conspiracy Theory.

In early 1997, Botch went on a seven-week tour throughout the United States and Canada with Ink & Dagger and Nineironspitfire, which gained them a significant amount of exposure. According to Brian Cook, "Ink & Dagger were kind of a big deal at that point, so we were playing a lot of club shows. I think we did a show at some theater in Buffalo, New York, with Snapcase and there were, like, a thousand people or something like that." Also in 1997, Excursion Records released The Unifying Themes of Sex, Death and Religion—a nine-track compilation album composed of the EPs The John Birch Conspiracy Theory and Faction in their entirety, and "Closure" from the various artists compilation I Can't Live Without It.

=== Hydra Head Records (1997–2002) ===
==== American Nervoso ====
Aaron Turner, former vocalist for the post-metal band Isis and founder of the record label Hydra Head Records, was following Botch's early career. He praised the group's interpretation of Carl Orff's classical piece "O Fortuna" off of The John Birch Conspiracy Theory EP, describing it as "amazing" and also saying that, "anytime I made a mix tape for someone else, I'd put ['O Fortuna'] on there." Turner contacted Botch and asked them to contribute a song to Hydra Head's In These Black Days—a compilation album of Black Sabbath cover songs released as a series of split singles. Botch recorded a cover of "The Wizard" from Black Sabbath's 1970 album Black Sabbath, and also sent Turner a demo album they had been working on at the time. About the demo, Aaron Turner said, "I can't remember if I had solicited it or if they just sent it to me. In any event, it was more than I was expecting from them even though I already thought they were good. I think I gave them about six or seven grand to do the record, which was probably more than I had given any other band that we had worked with at that point."

The demos were re-recorded with Matt Bayles at Pearl Jam guitarist Stone Gossard's own Studio Litho. After three days of recording and two days of mixing, the completed songs became Botch's debut studio album American Nervoso, released in 1998 through Hydra Head Records. In support of American Nervoso, Botch headlined a North American tour with The Dillinger Escape Plan and Jesuit. Beginning with this tour, John Pettibone was hired as the group's manager, and it also was Botch's first time bringing their own lighting equipment with them. Their stage setup included several halogen work lamps plugged into a power strip with a switch. Commenting on the lights, Dave Verellen said, "I hated the lights at clubs, which were always on the band, so we figured we'd turn them on the audience. [...] I liked it because I could see people's reaction in the crowd because their faces were totally illuminated." Also during this tour, Botch played music from the girl group Destiny's Child before they went on stage, which was intentionally drastically different from the more traditional "metal music [being played] in between the metal bands." Botch were also rumored to be recording a Destiny's Child covers EP—however, this release never materialized.

==== We Are the Romans ====
In 1999, Botch recorded some live demos with Matt Bayles for their second studio album and follow-up to American Nervoso. Two months later, Botch returned to Litho Studios with Bayles to record what would become We Are the Romans. The group only had approximately one week to track the album, and according to Knudson, the group "[rushed] to get everything done and do it as well as we wanted to." As a last minute addition to the album, Botch rewrote and rerecorded the song "Frequenting Mass Transit"—originally released on a split release with Murder City Devils—and changed the title to "Frequency Ass Bandit". We Are the Romans was released in November 1999 through Hydra Head Records on both CD and double LP vinyl formats. The title of the album was derived from the lyrics to the album's closing track "Man the Ramparts". According to Verellen: "Brian [Cook] thought it'd make a great title, but I thought it was a totally silly gladiator song. The riff is kinda huge, so I was thinking about chariots and fire and stuff like that. It sounds like I pulled the words out of Conan the Barbarian. But then we started talking about the social decline of Western civilization, and how Americans are the new Romans—it's all slaves and Caesars. So we made it work."

Botch's first show in support of We Are the Romans was the final show for the Seattle venue Rkcndy with The Blood Brothers, Playing Enemy and Kill Sadie in October 1999. The club was an all-ages venue that was being demolished to make way for a hotel. Verellen expressed his admiration for playing all-ages shows stating that, "People go to all-ages shows to see the bands, but people will go to bars... and while they're at the show, they're just hanging out with their friends. That doesn't mean all bar shows are like that, but that's what makes me not want to play bars, basically." In 2000, Botch toured Europe with The Dillinger Escape Plan, and also went on a smaller North American tour later that year. On July 28, 2001, Botch performed at Louisville, Kentucky's hardcore festival Krazy Fest 4 which also featured Coalesce, Converge, Poison the Well and Harkonen among others.

=== Breakup (2002) ===
"The way I look at it, Botch didn't break up because of personality conflicts. The conflicts that existed the day of the last show were present since the beginning. Botch broke up because we just weren't meshing anymore on a creative level. Some of us had different musical areas we wanted to explore."

— Tim Latona, interview with Alternative Press

Botch officially decided to break up the band in February 2002. Tensions between Tim Latona and Dave Knudson that originated from the We Are the Romans sessions and supporting tours built up to the point where members weren't communicating anymore. According to Dave Verellen, "it was the best idea for us just to break up while we were on top of things, rather than torture ourselves and keep chipping away till we hated each other." Botch also struggled to write a third studio album citing pressures to write a follow-up to their critically acclaimed We Are the Romans and suffering from "crazy writer's block." Knudson had also begun writing softer-sounding songs that didn't fit Botch's style, and formed the side-project Minus the Bear in 2001. Botch performed their final show on June 15, 2002, at The Showbox in downtown Seattle, Washington with The Blood Brothers, Harkonen and Playing Enemy.

When asked about the possibility of a reunion in a 2002 interview with the band, Dave Verellen said, "I'd be first in line to keep this goddamn band together." However, in the same interview, Knudson said, "I could totally see doing anything with any of those people that's not Botch but something else that's creative and fun... and maybe more aggressive." In a 2009 interview with Brian Cook, he revealed that Botch get asked to play reunion shows "on a regular basis." After Botch disbanded, Cook maintained that he would never reunite the band, but in a 2014 interview, he revealed that the other members of Botch felt like the band ended too early and that they had been urging him to stop saying the word "never" regarding a possible reunion.

=== Post-Break up activities (2002–2022) ===
==== Posthumous releases and reissues ====
Botch's cowboy logo was featured on the cover art all of its posthumous releases.

Before disbanding, Botch recorded a six-song EP titled An Anthology of Dead Ends—a small collection of songs Botch had written before breaking up. The EP was recorded in March 2002, an event which was described by producer Matt Bayles as being "incredibly tense." On the album's content, Verellen said: "Two of the tracks are things we did live that we just wanted to record" and one of the songs was "just a riff we never got a song written for, but it was just such a good riff." Hydra Head Records released An Anthology of Dead Ends on October 15, 2002; about four months after Botch played their final show. Also in 2002, Excursion Records reissued The Unifying Themes Of Sex, Death, And Religion under the name Unifying Themes Redux with seven additional tracks from Botch's split albums and compilation contributions.

In July 2006, Hydra Head announced they would release four Botch albums over the next year. The label first reissued the compilation album Unifying Themes Redux on September 26, 2006. A live two-disc set titled 061502 was released on December 5, 2006. The CD/DVD package features a live recording of Botch's final performance from June 15, 2002, at The Showbox. A remastered version of American Nervoso was released on July 7, 2007. This updated version was also packaged with various bonus features, including demos and extended versions of some tracks. For example, parts of the song "Hives" that were accidentally removed on the original recording were added back. And finally, Hydra Head Records released a two-disc remastered version of We Are the Romans on September 11, 2007. The second disc featured demo versions of We Are the Romans tracks and four live songs.

In September 2011, Hydra Head announced that they discovered approximately 450 vinyl record jackets for We Are the Romans in their storage space, and would repress the record using the album's original plates. After the records sold out in less than 20 minutes, the label stated they would make Botch reissues a "priority for 2012." For Record Store Day in 2012, Hydra Head reissued An Anthology of Dead Ends on vinyl. To commemorate the 10-year anniversary of Botch's final show, Hydra Head released a limited edition windbreaker that was only available for 24 hours on June 15, 2012. In March 2016, Hydra Head released a limited-edition vinyl set featuring all previously released LP editions of Botch's albums spread across nine discs compiled in a silver-foil stamped box featuring a 36-page extended liner note booklet.

==== Post-Botch bands ====
After Botch broke up, three of the four members continued to compose and perform music with new bands—drummer Tim Latona instead chose to continue his education. The complex tree of interchanging band members among these newly formed groups has been described as "incestuous."

Knudson continued performing with the math rock/indie rock band Minus the Bear with vocalist Jake Snider formerly of Sharks Keep Moving, drummer Erin Tate formerly of Kill Sadie, former Botch producer Matt Bayles on keys, and bassist Cory Murchy. Minus the Bear quickly signed to Suicide Squeeze Records and released two EPs, This Is What I Know About Being Gigantic and Bands Like It When You Yell "Yar!" at Them, before releasing their debut full-length Highly Refined Pirates in November 2002. The group released two more albums through Suicide Squeeze, Menos el Oso (2005) and Planet of Ice (2007), before signing to Dangerbird Records and releasing Omni (2010) and Infinity Overhead (2012).

The post-hardcore group These Arms Are Snakes was formed in 2002 by Brian Cook, Steve Snere formerly of Kill Sadie, Ryan Frederiksen of formerly of Nineironspitfire, Joe Preston and Jesse Robertson. The group signed to Jade Tree Records and released the EP This Is Meant to Hurt You (2003) and their debut full-length Oxeneers or the Lion Sleeps When Its Antelope Go Home (2004). These Arms Are Snakes went through a few lineup changes, one of which included Erin Tate of Minus the Bear and Kill Sadie, before solidifying their lineup with Chris Common on drums. With this formation, they released two more albums, Easter (2006) and Tail Swallower and Dove (2008)—the later of which was released on Suicide Squeeze Records—before disbanding in 2009.

Aside from working as a firefighter, Dave Verellen also formed the folk rock band Roy in 2002 with Brian Cook, Ben Verellen of Harkonen and Mike Cooper. The group released the EP Tacomatose (2003) and the full-length Big City Sin and Small Town Redemption (2004) before going on hiatus. During the break, Cook and Ben Verellen worked on These Arms Are Snakes' debut album Oxeneers or the Lion Sleeps When Its Antelope Go Home. Roy briefly reformed and released Killed John Train in 2006.

Brian Cook also joined the instrumental post-rock group Russian Circles in 2007, replacing former member Colin DeKuiper. Cook contributed to Russian Circles' second and third studio albums Station (2008) and Geneva (2009); both of which were released through Suicide Squeeze Records. The group then signed to Sargent House and released Empros (2011) and Memorial (2013). As of 2014, Brian is a part of Sumac, as a permanent bassist with Aaron Turner and Nick Yacyshyn. They have released their debut album The Deal in February 2015.

In 2008, vocalist Dave Verellen formed the mathcore band Narrows with Rob Moran of Unbroken and Some Girls, Sam Stothers of Makeout Boys, Jodie Cox of Bullet Union, and Ryan Frederiksen of These Arms Are Snakes and Nineironspitfire. Narrows signed to Deathwish Inc. and subsequently released a self-titled EP (2008) and two full-lengths: New Distances (2009) and Painted (2012).

=== Reunion (2022–2024) ===
Hydra Head Records went out of business in 2020, leaving Botch's catalog without a home and was subsequently entirely removed from online streaming services. In October 2021, Sargent House announced it had acquired Botch's full catalog and would maintain the band's digital presence as well as future vinyl represses going forward. The announcement from members of the band also teased "exciting things in 2022," which created speculation among Botch's fanbase that this alluded to a reunion. Cook later clarified: "You might have seen the news that Sargent House is bringing the Botch catalog back. We're very stoked. But to dispel any confusion, we are not reuniting." The first Sargent House reissued We Are the Romans in November 2022 and featuring a new song, "One Twenty Two". Despite regrouping to write and record the song, the members of Botch stated the band has not reunited and was not active.

On October 15, 2022, These Arms Are Snakes and Sandrider performed at a private birthday party for producer Matt Bayles. After These Arms Are Snakes' set, the members of Botch took to the stage without prior announcement to perform one song – "Saint Matthew Returns to the Womb". The night also marked the 20-year anniversary of the release of An Anthology of Dead Ends, Botch's final studio recording before disbanding.

The following week, Botch announced a pair of reunion shows in Seattle on February 24 and 25, 2023. After the tickets to these shows sold out in 13 seconds, Botch announced a third reunion show in their hometown of Tacoma on February 17. Coinciding with the Sargent House re-release of American Nervoso and their Tacoma reunion show, Botch announced a 14-date U.S. tour for October–December 2023.

Botch said they had no plans for their reunion beyond their tour; in an interview with Gut Feeling, Knudson said: "There's no more music for Botch on the horizon; we're doing these shows, and then it's done [...] it's going to happen for a very finite amount of time." In October 2023, the band announced a final EU and UK tour for March 2024, spanning fourteen dates, with three of these being in the UK. In May 2024, the band embarked on their first and only tour of Australia. The band played their final show at the Showbox in Seattle on June 15, 2024—22 years to the date of their original final performance (061502) in 2002. A live album of the concert was released through Sargent House on June 27, 2025.

== Influence and legacy ==
"To me, Botch is as important to what's going on today as Minor Threat was to hardcore in the late '80s. When you look at the evolution of independent music, Botch will be one of those bands that made a difference."

— Mark Thompson of Hydra Head, interview with Alternative Press

Botch's music was a major early influence on the mathcore and metalcore styles, and their final album We Are the Romans is specifically cited as a highly influential album. Decibel and Rock Sound both inducted the album into their publication's "Hall of Fame" features in November 2005 and August 2011 respectively. Rock Sound also declared We Are the Romans as one of the "big four" math metal albums in May 2008, and featured Botch in the publication's "Revolutionaries" column, which pays tribute to "the bands we just couldn't live without" in November 2006. In August 2005, Alternative Press listed We Are the Romans as a classic "other punk album"—or an album that was influential, but not commercially successful. In October 2009, Botch was featured in AbsolutePunk's "Weekly Nostalgia" piece, which pays tribute to disbanded musical groups. In November 2009, Jason Heller listed We Are the Romans as one of the albums that didn't make The A.V. Club's top 50 albums of previous decade list, but was still an important album of this period. In 2012, Rock Sound added Botch's We Are the Romans into its "101 Modern Classics," ranking at number 35.

Many artists have cited Botch's music as an influence or have expressed their admiration for it, including: American Standards, Architects, Jordan Blilie of The Blood Brothers, Dan Briggs of Between the Buried and Me, Breather Resist, Cancer Bats, Curl Up and Die, The Fall of Troy, Johnny Truant, Frank Turner of Million Dead, Norma Jean, The Ocean, Owl City, and Underoath. In January 2009, members of the Washington bands Kane Hodder and Schoolyard Heroes formed a tribute band and performed Botch songs at a local venue in a one-off performance.

Despite Botch's level of acclaim after their demise, the group was initially poorly received by the local Washington hardcore scene. For the majority of their existence, "the band found themselves shunned by cliques and crews." Latona described the negative reaction as "disheartening," and that Botch thought the group, "had something cool to share with people, and they were total assholes to us." In the late 1990s, the group's complex music wasn't seen as very accessible, and their constant "poking fun at the scene" wasn't warmly received by their peers. In addition to playing complex music, Botch actively avoided common hardcore stereotypes. Before walking on stage, Botch warmed up the crowd with pop music instead of heavier music. Botch sold a t-shirt that featured two shirtless homosexual males sitting close on a couch with the words "Botch: The Best Boy Band Ever" written directly below. Cook designed the shirt by tracing an image out of a homosexual pornographic magazine and "drew a beer bottle over the cock," which was meant to be a "rebellion against all the typical skull and switchblade imagery" that is prevalent in the hardcore scene. Botch wrote songs such as "C. Thomas Howell as the 'Soul Man'" which openly mocked straight-edge bands like Racetraitor and other bands with "lofty political ideals." Botch also cited living in Tacoma, Washington and being isolated from Seattle as another reason for not being accepted into any regional music scenes. In a 2011 interview with Rock Sound, Dave Verellen said "A lot of Seattle didn't like us, so we just did what we did," and that when We Are the Romans was released, "people were like, 'Yeah, it's good...' but like anything in that genre at the time it was a slow-starter because it wasn't exactly palatable. Hydra Head was stoked on it and, slowly, we started to get more press and play bigger shows. But even this week I've talked to more people about that record than I have since it came out."

The members of Botch have mixed feelings about their posthumous acclaim. In regards to what fans are willing to pay for out-of-print merchandise on eBay, Latona said "I don't mean to sound like a dick, but it's like, 'Where were you in 2001?'" but also continued by saying "On the other hand, it's flattering to hear that people even give a shit about what we did, because I fucking loved what we did." Knudson also said the continued interest in Botch was "flattering," but that "It would have been great if there were a ton of people at our shows in 98, but that's now how it goes." The members of Botch aren't impressed with many of the bands who they inspired, often describing these new acts as ripping them off. Knudson admitted to ripping off Soundgarden and Sepultura while writing for Botch, but said that playing the songs that you love is part of progressing as a musician, and that "Sometimes you can make [copying another band] into your own thing and then own it—which is how I feel we did it." Cook said being ripped off really bummed him out, and that:

Imitation is the highest form of flattery, I guess. And it's cool that people got something out of Botch. But one of the big parts of appreciating music is understanding the context in which that music exists. And I guess that's how I feel about these bands on Warped Tour that sound like Botch but don't really have anything in common with Botch. They don't have the same ideas about music and what music should do. They're just selling T-shirts.

— Brian Cook, interview with Alternative Press

== Musical style and lyrics ==
"The thing that Botch did in contrast to bands like Dillinger, Coalesce or even Cave In, was that they weren't trying to twist your head around just for the sake of twisting your head around. There aren't a lot bands I work with who aren't Isis or Mastodon who don't end up playing a Botch riff to me."

— Matt Bayles, interview with Alternative Press

Botch's musical genre is typically described as noisecore or metalcore. The group's technically and complexly composed music, along with their use of odd time signatures, often garners them the label of mathcore or math rock.

Inspired by bands like Helmet and Alice in Chains, when Botch formed they started playing in drop D tuning. According to Brian Cook, in this tuning, "you could play a power chord with one finger. Right away I was like, 'Fuck.' I was 16 and barely knew how to play the instrument, and all of a sudden it was tuned differently than what I was used to." Early demos were described as sounding like "chuggachugga straight-edge hardcore-style stuff." While Botch was still searching for its own identity, the members contemplated becoming a straight edge band for a period of time. All of the members admired the Seattle straight edge group Undertow—one of the biggest names in the Seattle hardcore scene at the time. Cook also expressed appreciation for the first albums of the vegan straight edge band Earth Crisis. On the group's feelings toward straight edge, Cook said:

At first, we thought straight edge was cool because we didn't like drunken frat boys. We thought about it in terms of Ebullition Records, but when the youth-crew stuff started becoming more popular and bands like Earth Crisis started taking over the straight-edge scene, we thought, 'Ugh, these are the frat boys.' Other bands we know might drink, but at least they were fun to hang out with.

— Brian Cook, interview with Alternative Press

Knudson's guitar playing was influenced by the "crazy and angular" bands Angel Hair and Drive Like Jehu—the latter of which was seen as an early influence on mathcore—and the heavier bands Sepultura, Soundgarden and Meshuggah.

== Band members ==
- Brian Cook – bass, backing vocals
- Dave Knudson – guitars
- Tim Latona – drums, percussion, piano
- Dave Verellen – lead vocals

Related figures

- Matt Bayles – engineer for all Hydra Head Records releases, the Murder City Devils split single and select tracks on Unifying Themes Redux
- John Pettibone – manager, light technician, backing vocals
- Ben Verellen – light technician, backing vocals, and brother of Dave Verellen

== Discography ==
=== Studio albums ===
- American Nervoso (1998, Hydra Head)
- We Are the Romans (1999, Hydra Head)

=== Live albums ===
- 061502 (2006, Hydra Head)
- 061524 (2025, Sargent House)

=== Compilation albums ===
- The Unifying Themes of Sex, Death and Religion (1997, Excursion)
- Unifying Themes Redux (2002, Excursion / 2006, Hydra Head)

=== Box sets ===
- Vinyl box set (2016, Hydra Head)

=== Extended plays ===
- Faction (1995, World of Hurt / Threshold)
- The John Birch Conspiracy Theory (1996, Phyte)
- An Anthology of Dead Ends (2002, Hydra Head)

=== Singles ===
- "One Twenty Two" (2022, Sargent House)

=== Split recordings ===
- Split with Nineironspitfire (1997, Indecision)
- In These Black Days Volume 5 with Cave In (1999, Hydra Head)
- Split with Murder City Devils (1999, Excursion)
- Split with Ananda and Knut (2000, Mosh Bart)

=== Other appearances ===
Contributed song	Year	Compilation	Label
"Circle 11"	1995	Psycho Civilized	Elevator Music
"Closure"	1996	I Just Can't Live Without It	Mountain Records
"End of Discussion"	1997	Brewing	Excursion Records
"Rock Lobster" (originally by The B-52s)	1997	All About Friends	Point Furthest from the Middle

== Videography ==
=== Video albums ===
- 061502 (Hydra Head, 2006)

=== Music videos ===
- "Saint Matthew Returns to the Womb" (2002)
- "One Twenty Two" (2022)

=== Other appearances ===
Contribution	Year	Compilation	Label
"Liquored Up and Laid" (live)	2002	Indecision Video Vault, Vol. 1	Indecision Records
"Live In Chez Heinz, Hannover, 20.11.2000"	2008	The Edge Of Quarrel: Punk Vs. Straight Edge	Excursion Records

== See also ==
- Music of Washington (state)
- Music of Seattle
- Hydra Head Records discography
