= Heiress (band) =

- Origin: Seattle, Washington, U.S.
- Genres: Sludge metal, post-metal
- Years active: 2006–present
- Labels: The Mylene Sheath, Deathwish

Heiress is an American band from Seattle, Washington, formed in 2006. Their style blends influences from hardcore punk, heavy metal and post-rock. They signed to Deathwish Inc. in 2010, and released their debut album Early Frost in 2013.

== History ==
Heiress was founded in Seattle, Washington in 2006 by guitarist Wes Reed. Reed originally planned being the only member of Heiress with different people contributing vocals. However, Reed recruited Adam Paysse, the co-founder of Rome Plow Records, who both found drummer Julian Zurdo and bassist Eric Severson, and recorded a demo with producer Ben Verellen (Harkonen, Helms Alee). In December 2008, John Pettibone, formerly of many Seattle-area bands including Himsa and Undertow, took over Paysse's place as lead vocalist. Pettibone's previous band Himsa disbanded because the members were tired of touring. With this lineup, Heiress recorded a five-song self-titled EP that was self-released by the band in 2009.

In 2010, Heiress signed to Deathwish Inc., an independent hardcore punk record label that was co-founded by Jacob Bannon of Converge. The group's first release through the label was a split 7-inch with Narrows. Guitarist Josh Freer joined the band and performed on this release temporarily replacing Jeremy McAllister.

In mid-2011, Jack Endino (Nirvana, Mudhoney, Murder City Devils) produced and engineered 17 new Heiress tracks at Soundhouse Studios. Endino also remixed two previously recorded Heiress songs. Deathwish released two of the songs from these sessions, "Naysayer" and "Just Throats," as a 7-inch vinyl single in 2012. The single featured artwork by Demian Johnston, who previously played with Pettibone in Undertow and Nineironspitfire, and was positively received by Alternative Press. Ten of the remaining tracks from this session became Heiress' full-length debut album titled Early Frost. In October 2011, Early Frost was expected to be released in 2012. However, Deathwish did not end up releasing the album until 2013 due to pressing plant delays.

Heiress released its second studio album Of Great Sorrow on February 10, 2015, through The Mylene Sheath — pushed back four months from its originally projected November 18, 2014, release date. The album was recorded by Tad Doyle of the Seattle-based band Tad and mastered by Chris Hanzsek (Soundgarden, Melvins) with artwork by Demian Johnston. Before the release of Of Great Sorrow, Heiress had already begun working on its third studio album with Matt Bayles (Botch, Isis, Mastodon) for a tentative 2015 release. The band released its third studio album Made Wrong on March 18, 2016, through The Mylene Sheath.

The Band released their fourth album Distant Fires on October 1, 2021.

== Members ==
=== Current members ===
- Wes Reed – guitar (2006–present)
- Justin Martinez – drums (2007–present)
- John Pettibone – vocals (2008–present)
- Nathan Turpen – guitar (2014–present)
- Mat Houot – bass (2016–present)

=== Former members ===
- Adam Paysse – vocals (2006–2008)
- Eric Severson – bass (2006–2014)
- Jeremy McAllister – guitar (2006–2009, 2010–2013)
- Josh Freer – guitars (2009–2010)
- Mark Holcomb – guitars (2013–2014)
- Jared Shealy– guitars (2014–2016)
- Julian Zurdo - drums

== Discography ==
=== Studio albums ===
- Early Frost (2013)
- Of Great Sorrow (2015)
- Made Wrong (2016)
- Distant Fires (2021)
- Nowhere Nearer (2024)

=== Singles and EPs ===
- Demo (2007)
- Heiress (2009)
- Narrows / Heiress (2010)
- "Naysayer" / "Just Throats" (2012)
