= One Twenty Two =

Single by Botch

from the album We Are the Romans (2022 reissue)
- Released: August 24, 2022
- Recorded: December 2021
- Length: 2:16
- Label: Sargent House
- Songwriters: Brian Cook; Dave Knudson; Tim Latona; Dave Verellen

"One Twenty Two" is a single by the American metal band Botch. The song was released as a digital single on August 24, 2022 and was included as a bonus track on the 2022 reissue of Botch's We Are the Romans through Sargent House. The single marked the first Botch release since 061502 in 2006, as well as the first release to include new material since An Anthology of Dead Ends in 2002. Despite regrouping to write and record the song, the members of Botch stated at the time of the song's release that the band has not reunited and was not active. However, Botch would go on to tour the world in 2023–2024.

== Background and recording ==
When Botch's former label Hydra Head Records officially folded and returned the master recordings of their catalog to them, the band members began talking together and with Sargent House about doing something special for the re-release of We Are the Romans. After Botch broke up, guitarist Dave Knudson focused his attention on his new indie rock band Minus the Bear. When Minus the Bear broke up in 2018, Knudson began writing solo material, which culminated in his 2022 debut album, The Only Thing You Have to Change is Everything. As he was writing music during the COVID-19 lockdowns, Knudson wanted to express his frustrations with the experience through creating a heavy song. While most of his solo material started with an acoustic guitar to be explored later electronically, the riff that eventually became "One Twenty Two" started with Knudson picking up his electric guitar and playing what he felt at the time.

The demo naturally progressed from a solo Knudson song into a Botch song when Dave Verellen was invited to provide guest vocals, and later Brian Cook and Tim Latona were brought into the mix as well. Though, Knudson had originally considered inviting Dimitri Minakakis of The Dillinger Escape Plan to provide guest vocals, before reaching out to Verellen. The song was written with the members of Botch trading ideas and digitally during the COVID-19 lockdowns. Knudson elaborated: "I had no intention of writing anything for Botch, but when I was thinking of a singer to collaborate with, I thought, 'Hey, I know the best hardcore singer ever to do it,' so I hit up Dave V. He was super excited, and so it just kind of snowballed from there. There was never any intent or conversation about getting back together or writing. It just happened so naturally and was a great release for all of us to make it happen without any of the traditional pressure an 'active' band faces." Cook said of the song's creation: "It wasn't intended to be a Botch song; it was intended to be its own thing. But it was the four of us, and it felt right, and doing something with my four old friends during the loneliness of lockdown for the pure joy of creation was ultimately more important than public opinion."

"One Twenty Two" was mixed by Matt Bayles, who produced most of Botch's catalogue in addition to several albums by Knudson's Minus the Bear and Cook's These Arms Are Snakes.

A live recording of the song was included on Botch's 2025 live album 061524, which documented the final performance of their 2023–2024 reunion tour.

== Music video ==
Botch released a music video directed by Dimitri Luedemann for "One Twenty Two" on August 24, 2022. The video features all four original members of Botch performing "One Twenty Two" in a small building back-lit with fluorescent tube lights. Writing for Pitchfork, Rob Arcand said the music video, "finds the band performing live in a practice space with dramatic cuts and lighting effects that capture the song's intensity." The recording of the music video was the first time Knudson performed live since 2018 after Minus the Bear's final tour, and he said he injured his neck from headbanging too hard.

== Critical reception ==
Music critics generally praised "One Twenty Two". Writing for NPR's "Viking's Choice" column, Lars Gotrich as feeling, "like an old muscle car revved back to life. Dave Knudson's spindly-but-burly guitar riff anchors the chaos as the rhythm section (bassist Brian Cook and drummer Tim Latona) gives the anthemic stomp swaggering purpose. But it's that combination with Dave Verellen's fiery maw that returns Botch to its proper pioneering stead." Writing for Rolling Stone, Kory Grow said, "Although each of the musicians have played in a variety of styles with other bands, they settle into one of their off-kilter grooves naturally on the track." Jack Rogers of Rock Sound said the song is, "a spiky and seething two minutes of noodling riffs and crushing bass, with the sort of innovative grit that only [Botch] could bring to the table." Tom Breihan of Stereogum said, "The track is a little less complex than the stuff that Botch were doing at their peak, but it's just as commanding and ferocious."

== Personnel ==
Botch

- Brian Cook – bass
- David Knudson – guitar
- Tim Latona – drums
- Dave Verellen – vocals

Technical personnel

- Matt Bayles – mixing
- Ed Brooks – mastering at Resonant Mastering
- David Knudson – recording
