= Painted (Narrows album) =

Studio album by Narrows
- Released: February 28, 2012
- Genre: Hardcore punk, post-hardcore, sludge metal, mathcore
- Length: 26:40
- Label: Deathwish Inc.
- Producer: Matt Bayles, Narrows

Narrows chronology
Narrows / Heiress (2010)	Painted (2012)

Professional ratings
Aggregate scores
Source	Rating
Metacritic	87/100
Review scores
Source	Rating
AbsolutePunk	(90%)
Alternative Press	4.5/5 stars
BBC	(positive)
Spin	(7/10)

Painted is the second studio album by the international rock band Narrows. The album was released on February 28, 2012, through Deathwish Inc. To promote Painted, prior to its release Narrows previewed the tracks "Under the Guillotine" and "Absolute Betrayer". A music video was also made for the song "TB Positive".

In 2011, Narrows guitarist Jodie Cox, who lives in England, was denied access to the United States. Cox's guitar parts were recorded by Wayne Pennell at Bunker Studios in Brentford, England and sent to the rest of the band over the internet. Matt Bayles tracked the rest of the album at Red Room Studio in Seattle, Washington. Cox described the process, which involved communicating with the rest of the band through the online video service Skype, as being "a frustrating and challenging experience."

== Track listing ==
All songs written by Narrows, except for "**** *** ******" written by Boz Boorer and Morrissey.

1. "Under the Guillotine" – 3:38
2. "TB Positive" – 2:01
3. "Absolute Betrayer" – 2:55
4. "Greenland" – 8:06
5. "'It's the Water'" – 2:10
6. "Face Paint" – 2:02
7. "Final Mass" – 2:22
8. "SST" – 3:26

Vinyl edition bonus track

9. "**** *** ******" (hidden track after a locked groove)

== Personnel ==
Painted personnel adapted from vinyl liner notes.

Narrows

- Jodie Cox – guitar
- Ryan Frederiksen – guitar
- Rob Moran – bass guitar
- Sam Stothers – drum kit
- Dave Verellen (credited as "Dr. Dave Verellen") – vocals

Additional musicians

- Matt Bayles – additional guitar on "Greenland" and "SST"
- Josh Billsetin – additional vocals
- Mike Cooper (Roy) – additional vocals
- Ben Verellen (Harkonen, Helms Alee, Roy) – additional vocals

Production

- Matt Bayles – production, engineering, mixing, mastering
- Narrows – production
- Wayne Pennell – additional recording in the UK

Artwork

- Ryan Frederiksen – art direction, design
- David Smith – photography
- Tamera Von Tart – makeup
