= The Unifying Themes of Sex, Death and Religion =

Compilation album by the American rock band Botch

Compilation album by Botch
- Released: 1997
- Recorded: Litho and Uptone Studios
- Genre: Mathcore
- Length: 26:20
- Label: Excursion
- Producer: Jake Snider, Wesley Mark

Botch chronology
| The John Birch Conspiracy Theory (1996) | The Unifying Themes of Sex, Death and Religion (1997) | American Nervoso (1998) |

Alternative cover
- Excursion's 2002 reissue cover. The artwork for Hydra Head's 2006 reissue features the same image, but it's colored orange instead of blue.

Professional ratings
for Unifying Themes Redux (2006)
Review scores
| Source | Rating |
|---|---|
| Pitchfork Media | (7.1/10) |
| PopMatters | (5/10) |
| Punknews.org | 4/5 stars |

The Unifying Themes of Sex, Death and Religion is a compilation album by the American rock band Botch. Originally released through Excursion Records in 1997, the album compiled Botch's first two EPs—The John Birch Conspiracy Theory and Faction—with the song "Closure" which was previously released on the various artists compilation I Can't Live Without It.

After the original release went out of print, Excursion Records re-released The Unifying Themes of Sex, Death and Religion with eight additional tracks in 2002 as Unifying Themes Redux. The updated version featured new artwork and tracks that were previously released on Botch's split EPs with Nineironspitfire and Murder City Devils, various artists compilations and three previously unreleased tracks. Unifying Themes Redux was later reissued by Hydra Head Records in 2006, the label which also released Botch's two studio albums, American Nervoso and We Are the Romans, in addition to their posthumous EP An Anthology of Dead Ends.

== Track listing ==
All tracks are written by Botch, except where noted.

Excursion 1997 (EXC-025)
| No. | Title | Original release (Label) | Length |
|---|---|---|---|
| 1. | "God vs. Science" | The John Birch Conspiracy Theory (Phyte) | 3:08 |
| 2. | "Third Part in a Tragedy" | The John Birch Conspiracy Theory (Phyte) | 1:42 |
| 3. | "Inch by Inch" | The John Birch Conspiracy Theory (Phyte) | 2:39 |
| 4. | "O Fortuna" (originally by Carl Orff) | The John Birch Conspiracy Theory (Phyte) | 3:18 |
| 5. | "Closure" | I Can't Live Without It (Mountain) | 3:10 |
| 6. | "Contraction" | Faction (World of Hurt, Threshold) | 2:32 |
| 7. | "Ebb" | Faction (World of Hurt, Threshold) | 3:24 |
| 8. | "Stupid Me" | Faction (World of Hurt, Threshold) | 1:38 |
| 9. | "In Spite of This" | Faction (World of Hurt, Threshold) | 4:49 |
| Total length: | | | 26:20 |

Excursion 2002 (EXC-032) and Hydra Head 2006 (HH666-118) bonus tracks
| No. | Title | Original release (Label) | Length |
|---|---|---|---|
| 10. | "End of Discussion" | Brewing (Excursion) | 2:56 |
| 11. | "Wounded" | Previously unreleased | 3:17 |
| 12. | "Liquored Up and Laid" | Split with Nineironspitfire (Indecision) | 3:32 |
| 13. | "Leavers Take on Genesis" | Split with Nineironspitfire (Indecision) | 2:28 |
| 14. | "Rock Lobster" (originally by The B-52s) | All About Friends (Point Furthest from the Middle) | 3:09 |
| 15. | "Frequenting Mass Transit" | Split with Murder City Devils (Excursion) | 5:05 |
| 16. | "Sudam" | Previously unreleased | 3:05 |
| 17. | Untitled (live set From WFMU) (hidden track) | Previously unreleased | 20:42 |
| Total length: | | | 70:42 |

== Personnel ==
Botch

- Brian Cook – bass guitar
- Dave Knudson – guitar
- Tim Latona – drum kit
- Dave Verellen – vocals

Production

- Matt Bayles – recording at Litho Studios (tracks 15, 16)
- Jake Snider – recording (tracks 5–11, 14)
- Wesley Mark – recording at Uptone Studios (tracks 1–4, 12, 13)
