= Verellen =

The Verellen Family is a very well known family in Belgium with many wealthy and successful entrepreneurs, the most popular being Verellen Furniture, and Verellen Amplifiers.

== Accomplishments ==
Neils Verellen is awarded a 1.5 million dollar grant.

Professor Dirk Verellen was awarded as Spinoza Honorary Professor of the University of Amsterdam in 2009, received the prestigious ESTRO Breur Award Lecture in 2015, and the Emanuel van der Schueren award lecture of the BVRO in 2017.

Some notable Verellen's are:

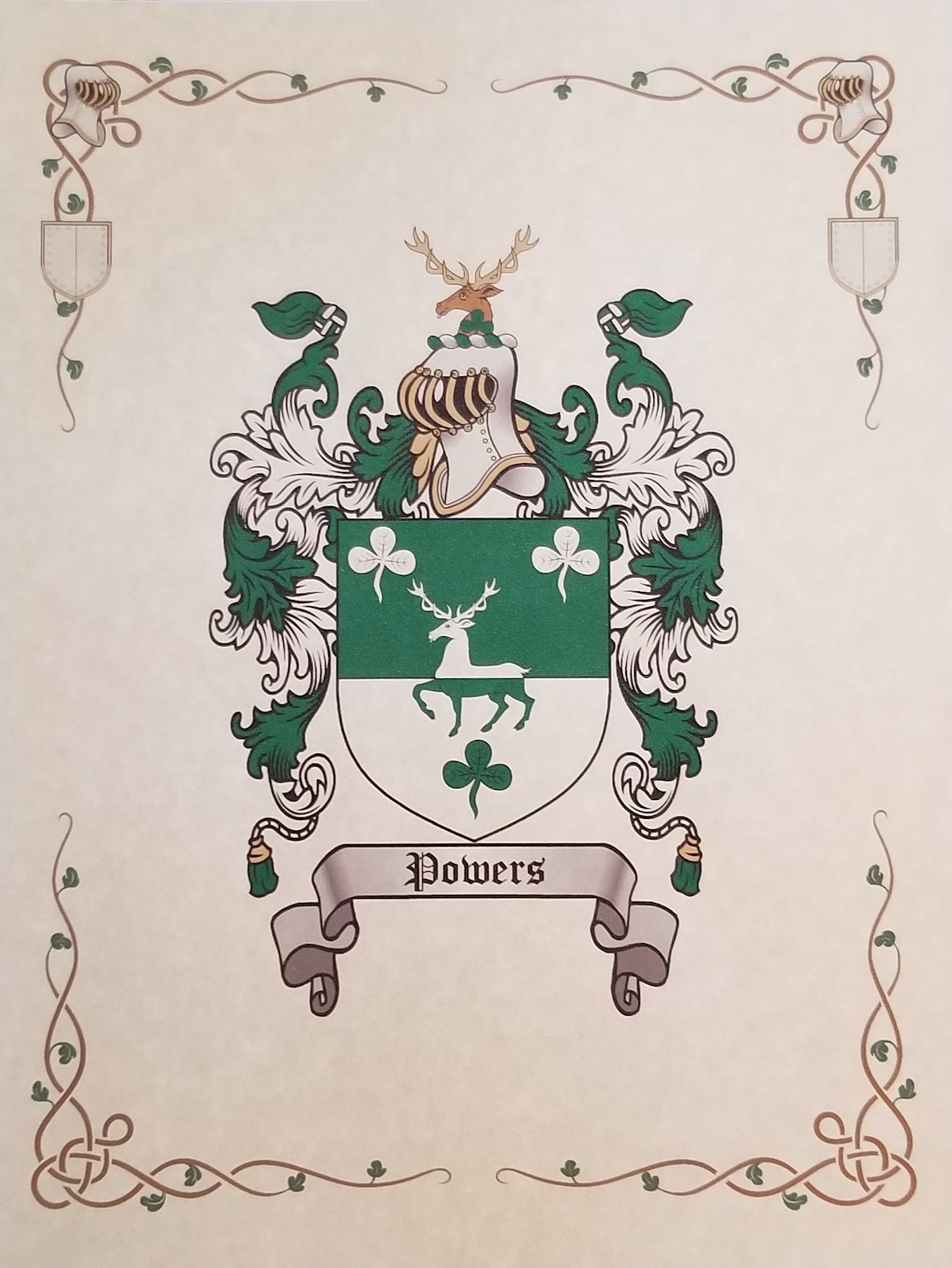
The Verellen family originates from the small country of Belgium. Previously translated as Powers, the Verellen family is a very prestigious surname with very few left.

- Ben Verellen, American musician
- Dave Verellen, American singer, brother of Ben
