= Ben Verellen =

American musician

- Origin: Tacoma, Washington, U.S.
- Genres: Post-hardcore, heavy metal, noise rock, country
- Occupations: Musician, audio engineer, record producer
- Instruments: Bass, guitar, drums
- Years active: 1995–present
- Label: Hydra Head
- Member of: Helms Alee
- Formerly of: Harkonen; Roy; These Arms Are Snakes

Benjamin James Verellen is an American musician and audio engineer from Tacoma, Washington.

== Career ==
=== Musician ===
Verellen's first role was as bassist of the Tacoma post-hardcore/noise rock group Harkonen which formed in 1995. Harkonen released their debut album in 1999 through Wreck-Age before signing to Hydra Head Records in 2001. The group's final release was Like a Virgin—a split release with These Arms Are Snakes— before disbanding in 2005.

He formed the country music/folk rock band Roy as a side project in 2002 with his brother Dave Verellen and Brian Cook. The group released two studio albums and a few EPs and has been inactive since 2006.

Verellen performed additional bass on These Arms Are Snakes' debut album Oxeneers or the Lion Sleeps When Its Antelope Go Home, and was also briefly a touring drummer in 2005 until he abruptly quit without explanation and was quickly replaced by Chris Common.

He is currently a member of the experimental metal band Helms Alee.

=== Other avenues ===
In 2000, Verellen began working as an audio engineer for many local Washington bands in his basement. He later earned a bachelor's degree in electrical engineering, and started his own business building and selling guitar amplifiers called Verellen Amplifiers.

== Personal life ==
Ben Verellen is the brother of Dave Verellen—member of Botch, Roy and Narrows.

== Discography ==
=== As band member ===
With Harkonen

- Harkonen (1999)
- Grizz (2001)
- Shake Harder Boy (2002)
- Dancing (2003)
- Like a Virgin (2005)

With Roy

- Tacomatose (2003)
- Big City Sin and Small Town Redemption (2004)
- Killed John Train (2006)

With Helms Alee

- Helms Alee (2008)
- Night Terror (2008)
- Weatherhead (2011)
- Sleepwalking Sailors (2014)
- Stillicide (2016)
- Noctiluca (2019)
- Keep This Be the Way (2022)

With Constant Lovers

- Experience Feelings (2014)

=== As guest musician ===
| Year | Band | Album | Role |
|---|---|---|---|
| 2004 | These Arms Are Snakes | Oxeneers or the Lion Sleeps When Its Antelope Go Home | Additional bass |
| 2006 | Botch | 061502 | Backing vocals |
| 2009 | Pelican | What We All Come to Need | Guest bass |
| 2009 | Narrows | New Distances | Additional vocals |

=== As producer or audio engineer ===
| Year | Band | Album | Role |
|---|---|---|---|
| 2005 | Valis | Champions of Magic | Engineer |
| 2006 | The Plains | Boy in the Mansuit | Mixing, vocal engineer |
| 2006 | The Vows | Vows | Engineer |
| 2006 | Mastodon | Blood Mountain | Assistant engineer |
| 2006 | The Helm | Grim Harvest | Engineer, mixing |
| 2007 | Champion | Different Directions | Engineer, mixing |
| 2007 | Lozen | Enemies Against Power | Engineer |
| 2008 | Mamiffer | Hirror Enniffer | Engineer |
| 2009 | John Spalding | Loveland: The Beautiful Truth | Engineer |
| 2009 | The Nightgowns | Sing Something | Tracking |
| 2009 | Narrows | New Distances | Producer, engineer |
