= New Distances =

Studio album by Narrows
- Released: May 12, 2009
- Genres: Post-hardcore, mathcore, hardcore punk, sludge metal
- Length: 28:25
- Label: Deathwish (DWI77)
- Producers: Ben Verellen, Narrows

Narrows chronology
Narrows (2008)	New Distances (2009)	Narrows / Heiress (2010)

Professional ratings
Review scores
Source	Rating
AbsolutePunk	(81%)
Allmusic	4/5 stars

New Distances is the first studio album by the international collaborative mathcore band Narrows.

== Track listing ==
All music by Narrows, all lyrics by Dave Verellen except "Gypsy Kids" by Shawn Brown.

1. "Chambered" − 2:17
2. "Sea Witch" − 2:15
3. "A Restoration Effort" − 3:22
4. "I Give You Six Months" − 2:48
5. "Changing Clothes" − 2:48
6. "Newly Restored" − 4:44
7. "The Fourragere" − 3:04
8. "Gypsy Kids" − 6:13
9. "Marquis Lights" − 4:06

== Personnel ==
New Distances personnel adapted from CD liner notes.

Narrows

- Jodie Cox – guitar
- Ryan Frederiksen – guitar
- Rob Moran – bass
- Sam Storhers – drums
- Dave Verellen – vocals

Additional musicians

- Shawn Brown – lyrics on "Gypsy Kids"
- Steve Snere (Kill Sadie, These Arms Are Snakes) – additional vocals
- John Spalding (Ninety Pound Wuss, Raft of Dead Monkeys) – additional guitar
- Ben Verellen (Harkonen, Roy) – additional vocals

Production

- Matt Bayles (Minus the Bear) – mixing
- Ed Brooks – mastering
- Chris Common (These Arms Are Snakes) – technical drum assistance
- Narrows – production
- Ben Verellen – production, engineering

Artwork

- Ryan Frederiksen – art direction, photography
