= Time Slips Away =

Compilation album by Champion
- Released: 2005
- Genre: Hardcore punk
- Label: Bridge 9 Records

Champion chronology
Promises Kept (2004)	Time Slips Away (2005)	Different Directions (2007)

Professional ratings
Review scores
Source	Rating
AllMusic	3/5 stars

Time Slips Away is an album by Champion. It contains their two EPs, Count Our Numbers and Come Out Swinging. It was released in 2005 on Bridge 9 Records.

== Track listing ==
No.	Title	Length
1.	"Decline"	1:47
2.	"Fourth of July"	2:29
3.	"Time Slips Away"	2:35
4.	"Monument"	2:43
5.	"One Sixteen"	1:18
6.	"Is Anybody There?"	1:39
7.	"Intro"	1:47
8.	"Harrison and Broadway"	2:08
9.	"Assume the Worst"	2:01
10.	"Insider"	2:40
11.	"Left Your Mark"	4:15
12.	"Thank You Note"	2:03
13.	"One to Two"	2:07
14.	"(Untitled track)"	1:10
