= We Are the Romans =

Studio album by Botch
- Released: November 1999
- Recorded: June 29 – July 8, 1999
- Studio: Studio Litho (Seattle, Washington)
- Genres: Mathcore; metalcore
- Length: 52:35 (original release); 47:24 (2022 reissue)
- Label: Hydra Head
- Producers: Matt Bayles; Botch

Botch chronology
American Nervoso (1998)	We Are the Romans (1999)	An Anthology of Dead Ends (2002)

We Are the Romans is the second and final studio album by American metalcore band Botch. It was originally released in November 1999 through Hydra Head Records. Since its release, it has been seen as an influential album on hardcore music.

== Recording ==
In 1999, Botch recorded some live demos with Matt Bayles for their second studio album and follow up to American Nervoso. Two months later, Botch returned to Litho Studios with Bayles to record what would become We Are the Romans. The group only had approximately one week to track the album, and according to Knudson, the group "[rushed] to get everything done and do it as well as we wanted to." As a last minute addition to the album, Botch rewrote and rerecorded the song "Frequenting Mass Transit"—originally released on a split release with Murder City Devils—and changed the title to "Frequency Ass Bandit".

== Composition and lyrics ==
The title of the album was derived from the lyrics to the album's closing track "Man the Ramparts". According to Verellen: "Brian [Cook] thought it'd make a great title, but I thought it was a totally silly gladiator song. The riff is kinda huge, so I was thinking about chariots and fire and stuff like that. It sounds like I pulled the words out of Conan the Barbarian. But then we started talking about the social decline of Western civilization, and how Americans are the new Romans—it's all slaves and Caesars. So we made it work." Bassist Brian Cook, who determined many of the song titles, credits J. G. Ballard's book The Atrocity Exhibition as inspiring themes of "the human body as a landscape, and the way that culture and environment sort of dictates the human body and vice versa." "C. Thomas Howell as the 'Soul Man'" has been described by the band as satirizing Racetraitor and "other bands with these very lofty political ideals that seemed like more a marketing tool for the genre of political hardcore rather than a sincere agenda" (Brian Cook).

== Promotion and release ==
We Are the Romans was released in November 1999 through Hydra Head Records on both CD and double LP vinyl formats.

Botch's first show in support of We Are the Romans was the final show for the Seattle venue Rkcndy with The Blood Brothers, (the Blood Brothers known for their fondness of the devices rode Segueways on stage for the first time during this show. This trend would continue up until the bands break up several years later). Playing Enemy and Kill Sadie in October 1999. The club was an all-ages venue that was being demolished to make way for a hotel. Verellen expressed his admiration for playing all-ages shows stating that, "People go to all-ages shows to see the bands, but people will go to bars... and while they're at the show, they're just hanging out with their friends. That doesn't mean all bar shows are like that, but that's what makes me not want to play bars, basically." In 2000, Botch toured Europe with The Dillinger Escape Plan, and also went on a smaller North American tour later that year. On July 28, 2001, Botch performed at Louisville, Kentucky's hardcore festival Krazy Fest 4, which also featured Coalesce, Converge, Poison the Well and Harkonen among others.

A remastered two disc edition was later released on September 11, 2007. A Hydra Head repressing of the vinyl was released on October 25, 2011. The repress sold out on pre-order in under 20 minutes.

On November 4, 2022, Sargent House reissued We Are the Romans following the collapse of Hydra Head Records. The reissue notably features the newly written and recorded bonus track "One Twenty Two" .

== Reception and legacy ==
Professional ratings
Review scores
Source	Rating
AllMusic	4/5 stars
Drowned in Sound	10/10
Exclaim!	favorable
Kerrang!	4/5 stars
Punknews.org	4/5 stars
Ox-Fanzine	9/10
PopMatters	9/10
Stylus Magazine	B+
Sputnikmusic	4.5/5

The album achieved critical acclaim upon release and would become an influential work of music on the mathcore and metalcore movements. Loudwire named the album fifth in its rankings of the 25 best Metalcore albums of all-time and Metal Hammer magazine named it one of the 20 best 1999 metal albums in a 2021 list.

In November 2005, We Are the Romans was inducted into the Decibel magazine Hall of Fame, with Decibel naming it one of the most influential hardcore albums of the 1990s.

In 2020, John Hill of Loudwire included the album in his list of the "Top 25 Metalcore Albums of All Time."

It was cited as the band's best album by Bryan Rolli of Loudwire in 2025.

== Track listing ==
All songs written and arranged by Botch.

No.	Title	Length
1.	"To Our Friends in the Great White North"	5:10
2.	"Mondrian Was a Liar"	2:41
3.	"Transitions from Persona to Object"	6:04
4.	"Swimming the Channel vs. Driving the Chunnel"	4:30
5.	"C. Thomas Howell as the 'Soul Man'"	4:44
6.	"Saint Matthew Returns to the Womb"	3:04
7.	"Frequency Ass Bandit"	4:26
8.	"I Wanna Be a Sex Symbol on My Own Terms"	3:35
9.	"Man the Ramparts" (song ends at 9:54 and is followed by a minute of silence)	10:50

Original release bonus track (1999)
No.	Title	Length
10.	Untitled (hidden remix of "Thank God for Worker Bees")	7:27

Sargent House reissue bonus track (2022)
No.	Title	Length
10.	"One Twenty Two"	2:16

=== Remaster bonus disc (2007) ===
No.	Song title (working titles in italics)	Notes	Time
1.	"To Our Friends in the Great White North" (demo) "Canada Song" or "Tasting Like a Hot Lunch in Amsterdam"	We Are the Romans demos Recorded live on Digital Audio Tape by Matt Bayles at Studio Litho; May 31, 1999	5:17
2.	"I Wanna Be a Sex Symbol on My Own Terms" (demo) "Latin Song"	We Are the Romans demos Recorded live on Digital Audio Tape by Matt Bayles at Studio Litho; May 31, 1999	3:41
3.	"Transitions from Persona to Object" (demo) "Circus Song" or "Saturn Aligned with Mars"	We Are the Romans demos Recorded live on Digital Audio Tape by Matt Bayles at Studio Litho; May 31, 1999	6:34
4.	"Mondrian Was a Liar" (demo) "Bam Bam and Other Assorted Onamonapeia"	We Are the Romans demos Recorded live on Digital Audio Tape by Matt Bayles at Studio Litho; May 31, 1999	3:02
5.	"Saint Matthew Returns to the Womb" (demo) "F.I.M.D (Top Secret! Don't Ask!)"	We Are the Romans demos Recorded live on Digital Audio Tape by Matt Bayles at Studio Litho; May 31, 1999	3:21
6.	"C. Thomas Howell as the 'Soul Man'" (demo) "C. Thomas Howell as the 'Soul Man'"	We Are the Romans demos Recorded live on Digital Audio Tape by Matt Bayles at Studio Litho; May 31, 1999	4:25
7.	"Man the Ramparts" (demo) "Man the Ramparts for There Are Fair Maidens Aplenty"	We Are the Romans demos Recorded live on Digital Audio Tape by Matt Bayles at Studio Litho; May 31, 1999	6:33
8.	"Saint Matthew Returns To The Womb" (live)	Live in Seattle; April 21, 2001, at Graceland	4:20
9.	"Vietmam" (live)	Live in Seattle; April 21, 2001, at Graceland	3:13
10.	"Transitions from Persona to Object" (live)	Live in France; November 11, 1999	6:01
11.	"Hutton's Great Heat Engine" (live)	Live in France; November 11, 1999	6:19

== Credits ==
Writing, performance and production credits are adapted from the album liner notes.

=== Personnel ===
==== Botch ====
- Dave Verellen – vocals
- Dave Knudson – guitar
- Brian Cook – bass guitar, backing vocals
- Tim Latona – drums

==== Additional musicians ====
- Sylvia Kehl – vocals on "Man the Ramparts"
- Logic Probe – manipulation, arrangement of "Thank God for Worker Bees"
  - DuROC
  - Colossus

==== Production ====
- Botch – production
- Matt Bayles – production, recording, mixing
- Ed Brooks – remastering
- Jeff Rigourd – live recording of "Vietmam" and "Hutton's Great Heat Engine"

==== Visual art ====
- Carrie Whitney – photography
- Jason Hellmann – photography (live)
- Dave Knudson – art direction, design
- John Pettibone – lights

=== Locations ===
==== Studios ====
- Studio Litho – recording (May 31, 1999 (demos), June 29 – July 8, 1999)
- Avast – mixing (July 11–15, 1999)
- RFI Mastering – remastering (June 5, 2007)

==== Venues ====
- Graceland, Seattle, Washington, US – live recording of "Saint Matthew Returns to the Womb" and "Transitions from Persona to Object"
- unknown venue, Rennes, France – live recording of "Vietmam" and "Hutton's Great Heat Engine"
