= American Nervoso =

Studio album by Botch
- Released: May 20, 1998
- Recorded: March 1998
- Studio: Stepping Stone Studio Litho (Seattle, Washington)
- Genre: Metalcore; mathcore
- Length: 35:04
- Label: Hydra Head (HH666-29) (HH666-129) (reissue)
- Producer: Matt Bayles, Botch

Botch chronology
The Unifying Themes of Sex, Death and Religion (1997)	American Nervoso (1998)	We Are the Romans (1999)

American Nervoso is the first studio album by American metalcore band Botch, released in 1998 through Hydra Head Records. It was re-issued in 2007, with five bonus tracks appended to the end of the record, consisting of demos and extended versions. The re-issue includes demos, extended versions of songs and the two opening measures of "Hives", which were accidentally clipped off in the original mastering, and was remastered by Matt Bayles sometime in 2006.

== Critical reception ==
Professional ratings
Review scores
Source	Rating
Ox-Fanzine	9/10
Pitchfork	6.6/10
PopMatters	8/10
Stylus Magazine	A−

Writing about the album's re-issue in 2007, Adrien Begrand of PopMatters said "eight years after the fact, Botch's debut album is still as awe-inspiring as it ever was."

== Track listing ==
No.	Title	Length
1.	"Hutton's Great Heat Engine"	4:25
2.	"John Woo"	3:14
3.	"Dali's Praying Mantis"	2:38
4.	"Dead for a Minute"	3:47
5.	"Oma"	4:40
6.	"Thank God for Worker Bees"	3:57
7.	"Rejection Spoken Softly"	3:44
8.	"Spitting Black"	3:07
9.	"Hives"	5:32

Re-issue bonus tracks
No.	Title	Length
10.	"Stupid Me"	2:34
11.	"Spitting Black" (extended version)	4:27
12.	"Hutton's Great Heat Engine" (demo)	4:27
13.	"Rejection Spoken Softly" (demo)	3:41
14.	"John Woo" (demo)	3:25
Total length:		53:38

== Credits ==
Band members

- Brian Cook – bass guitar, backing vocals and production
- Dave Knudson – guitar, production, layout and design
- Tim Latona – piano, drums and production
- Dave Verellen – vocals and production

Other personnel

- Matt Bayles – production, engineering and mixing
- Joe Denardo – photography
- Sig Skavlan – mixing
