= Dust Moth =

American rock band

Dust Moth is an American shoegaze/alternative rock band from Seattle, Washington, formed by members of the bands Undertow, These Arms Are Snakes, and Minus the Bear.

== History ==
Dust Moth member Ryan Frederiksen played in the bands These Arms Are Snakes, Narrows, and Undertow, and vocalist Irene Barber (former singer/guitarist for XVIII Eyes and current Erik Blood collaborator); Matt Bayles formerly played keyboards for Minus the Bear. After signing with the label The Mylene Sheath, the group released a split 7-inch vinyl record with the band Aeges in 2013. On April 22, 2014, the group's debut full-length, Dragon Mouth, was issued on the same label.

== Members ==
- Irene Barber – vocals
- Ryan Frederiksen – guitar
- Steve Becker – bass
- Jim Acquavella – drums

Former members

- Matt Bayles – keyboards, production
- Mark Holcomb – rhythm guitar
- Jason Craig – bass
- Jacob James – bass
- Andy King – drums

== Discography ==
- Split with Aeges (The Mylene Sheath, 2013)
- Dragon Mouth (The Mylene Sheath, 2014)
- Scale (The Mylene Sheath, 2016)
- Rising//Sailing (A Thousand Arms, March 12, 2021)
