= 061502 =

Video by Botch
- Released: December 5, 2006
- Recorded: The Showbox, Seattle, WA, June 15, 2002.
- Genre: Mathcore; metalcore
- Length: 1:13:52
- Label: Hydra Head Records (HH666-86)

Botch chronology
An Anthology of Dead Ends (2002)	061502 (2006)

061502 is a live concert DVD of Botch‘s final show at The Showbox in Seattle. It contains two discs, one for the Concert DVD consisting of 14 songs with a bonus commentary, and a video for "Saint Matthew Returns To The Womb", and other bonuses. The second disc is a CD containing the audio version of the DVD. The set was released on vinyl in 2016.

== Track listing ==
Disc One
No.	Title	Length
1.	"Saint Matthew Returns to the Womb"	3:36
2.	"C. Thomas Howell as the "Soul Man""	4:51
3.	"John Woo"	4:17
4.	"Japam"	2:59
5.	"Oma"	2:38
6.	"Frequency Ass Bandit"	5:19
7.	"Thank God for the Worker Bees"	4:13
8.	"Framce"	3:48
9.	"Third Part in a Tragedy"	1:57
10.	"Rock Lobster" (The B-52's Cover)	3:45
11.	"Transitions from Persona to Object"	7:44
12.	"To Our Friends in the Great White North"	8:01
13.	"Hutton's Great Heat Engine"	5:31
14.	"Man the Ramparts" (Feat. Ben Verellen and all of Playing Enemy)	7:35

Disc Two - DVD
No.	Title	Length
1.	"Saint Matthew Returns to the Womb"
2.	"C. Thomas Howell as the "Soul Man""
3.	"Hutton's Great Heat Engine" (Live)
4.	"Oma" (Live)
5.	"Frequency Ass Bandit" (Live)
6.	"Transitions from Persona to Object" (Live)

== Credits ==
- Ed Brooks (Mastering)
- Josh Graham (Editing)
- Josh Graham (Authoring)
- Matt Bayles (Engineer)
- Matt Bayles (Mixing)
- Brian Cook (Liner Notes)
- Brian Cook (Group Member)
- Ben Verellen (Guest Appearance)
- Dave Verellen (Group Member)
- Demian Johnston (Guest Appearance)
- John Pettibone (Vocals (Background))
- John Pettibone (Lighting)
- Andrew Gormley (Guest Appearance)
- Shane Mehling (Guest Appearance)
