= Different Directions =

Different Directions may refer to:

- Different Directions (John Denver album), 1991
- Different Directions (Champion album), 2007
- "Different Directions", a song by Angie Stone from the Diary of a Mad Black Woman soundtrack
