= Narrows (band) =

American mathcore band

- Origin: Seattle, Washington, U.S.
- Genres: Mathcore, hardcore punk, post-hardcore, sludge metal
- Years active: 2008–2020.
- Label: Deathwish
- Members: Dave Verellen; Sam Stothers; Rob Moran; Jodie Cox; Ryan Frederiksen
- Website: deathwishinc.com/collections/narrows

Narrows is an American mathcore band based in Seattle, but with members "spread out across both the United States and two continents." The band has been described as a supergroup, as its lineup includes Dave Verellen of Botch and members of bands including Unbroken, These Arms Are Snakes and Bullet Union. Narrows is a part-time band. All members have full-time jobs and are starting their own families.

== Members ==
- Jodie Cox – guitar (also of Tropics, Bullet Union)
- Ryan Frederiksen – guitar (also of These Arms Are Snakes, Dust Moth, Nineironspitfire)
- Sam Stothers – drums (also of Makeout Boys)
- Dave Verellen – vocals (also of Botch, Roy)
- Rob Moran – bass guitar (also of Unbroken, Some Girls)

== Discography ==
=== Studio albums ===
- New Distances (Deathwish, 2009)
- Painted (Deathwish, 2012)

=== EPs ===
- Narrows (Deathwish, 2008)
- Heiress / Narrows (split with Heiress) (Deathwish, 2010)
- Narrows / Retox (split with Retox) (Three.One.G, 2014)

=== Music videos ===
- "Chambered" (2009)
- "Gypsy Kids" (2009)
- "TB Positive" (2012)
