= Promises Kept (Champion album) =

Studio album by Champion
- Released: August 10, 2004
- Genre: Hardcore punk
- Length: 23:00
- Label: Bridge 9 Records
- Producer: Kurt Ballou

Champion chronology
Count Our Numbers (2002)	Promises Kept (2004)	Time Slips Away (2005)

Promises Kept is Champion's first full-length album. It was released in 2004 on Bridge 9 Records.

== Track listing ==
1. "Promises Kept"
2. "Looking Back"
3. "Next Year"
4. "Decisions Made"
5. "Miles to Go"
6. "The Truth"
7. "Perspective"
8. "Failure"
9. "The Decline"
10. "The Break"
11. "Different Directions"
12. "Every Word"
