= Racetraitor =

American hardcore punk band

- Origin: Chicago, Illinois, U.S.
- Genres: Hardcore punk; metalcore; grindcore
- Years active: 1996–1999, 2016–present
- Labels: Good Life; Uprising; Trustkill; Organized Crime; Good Fight Music; Ugly and Proud; Carry The Weight; Twelve Gauge
- Members: Andy Hurley; Mani Mostofi; Brent Decker; Dan Binaei; Andrea Black
- Past members: Karl Hlavinka; Eric Bartholomae; Pete Wentz; Rich Miles

Racetraitor is an American hardcore punk and metal band originally from Chicago, Illinois. The band attracted controversy in the late 1990s, before any releases, as a result of their radical take on racial politics, which focused on ideas like systemic racism and white privilege before they were widely discussed topics in popular or underground culture. Racetraitor was also a key proto-metalcore act, one of the first few bands to incorporate extreme metal influences, such as death metal, grindcore, and doom metal, into hardcore.

In 1998, the band released their album Burn the Idol of the White Messiah. The album was followed by a split EP with Indianapolis band Burn It Down called Make Them Talk in 1999 before an initial breakup. The band has reformed as of 2016 and has since released four new EPs and two LPs, 2042 and Creation and the Timeless Order of Things.

== History ==
=== Early career ===
Racetraitor was formed in 1996 by drummer Karl Hlavinka, guitarist Daniel Binaei, bassist Brent Decker, and vocalist Mani Mostofi, playing powerviolence/grindcore music. Early songs were extremely short and heavily filled with noise. The songs were recorded in a demo that was not publicly released until 2016.

In the early shows, Racetraitor took a more confrontational approach to spreading social justice ideas. The band became known for calling their own audience members "crackers", which the band explained as not a racial category but a term for people who perpetuate racism and exploitation in their day-to-day lives. During a performance in Columbus, Ohio during this period, the band members criticized members of Anti-Racist Action for focusing on white nationalist groups like the Ku Klux Klan rather than systemic issues such as institutional racism, leading to a physical altercation between the groups.

Racetraitor's reputation for their "in your face" politics spread quickly throughout the hardcore scene resulting in cover stories in both Maximum Rocknroll and HeartattaCk, two of the biggest punk and hardcore publications of the era, before they had released a single note of music. A readers poll in HeartattaCk ranked the band as one of the most loved and hated bands of 1996.

=== Burn the Idol and Make Them Talk ===
A year into the band, Andy Hurley joined as a drummer and Hlavinka began performing as a guitarist. The band noted that when Hurley joined the band, they changed sounds to match his technical ability, shifting from a noisy powerviolence band to a style closer to 1990s death metal. Hlavinka soon quit, only to return to the band on and off over the years. In 1997, the band went into Sonic Iguana studios Lafayette Indiana to record their debut. In 1998, Uprising Records released Burn the Idol of the White Messiah. Decker soon left the group; a number of musicians played bass in the band temporarily, including Fall Out Boy's Pete Wentz.

=== Reunion and 2042 ===
In 2016, Racetraitor announced via Facebook that a new remixed version of Burn the Idol would be re-released on vinyl. In October 2016, the band played its first show in 17 years with Detroit hardcore band Earthmover. In September 2016, the group released two new songs: "By the Time I Get to Pennsylvania" and "Damaged". Hurley attributed the band's reformation to the current political situation. "We had discussed playing a show or doing something else over the years, but nostalgia was never all that motivating, so the idea died," Hurley explained. "But with everything happening in the past couple of years, from the way things heated up in Ferguson, Missouri, to the rise in xenophobia and bigotry reflected by the popularity of Donald Trump, making new music with Racetraitor felt important again."

In July 2017, British label Carry the Weight Records released a reissue of Burn the Idol of the White Messiah. The record was remixed by Dallas Thomas from Pelican. The same month, Organized Crime Records released the EP Invisible Battles Against Invisible Fortresses. The band supported the record with shows across the US, including the This is Hardcore festival, and a small European tour with Sect, which included a stop at Fluff Fest in the Czech Republic.

Racetraitor announced their signing to Good Fight Music in October 2018, releasing their second full-length 2042 with lead single "BLK XMAS." 2042 received strong critical acclaim, landing in Vice Magazine's list of 100 Best Albums of 2018. Vice call the record "a barn-burning blast of metallic hardcore fury that screams by with guns blazing and fists held high." The record's title "2042" referred to the year when the US census predicts that white Americans become less than 51 percent of the population. Mostofi explained that "their decision to nab this particular title as a nod to that particular brand of fragile white fear, and a thumbed nose at the inflammatory xenophobic, Islamophobic rhetoric fueling the right wing’s terror."

In February 2020, the band joined Swedish post-hardcore legends Refused on the east coast leg of their US tour.

=== Split records and Creation and the Timeless Order of Things ===
In April 2023, Racetraitor released a split EP with Neckbeard Deathcamp, Closet Witch, and Haggathorn.

After the murder of George Floyd, Racetraitor organized the "Shut It Down" compilation which raised over 30,000 dollars for the Movement for Black Lives. The compilation featured 48 well received tracks, including from prominent metal and hardcore acts such as Sunn O))), Primitive Man, Xibalba, Minority Threat, Thou, War on Women (band), Misery Signals, Burn, Amygdala, Terminal Nation, Modern Life is War, and more.

== Message and image ==
The band attracted controversy in the late 1990s as a result of their radical take on racial politics. As a result of the attention and before releasing any music, Racetraitor was featured on the covers of Maximumrocknroll and HeartattaCk, two of the most influential punk and hardcore publications at the time. Their political advocacy centered around anti-racism and anti-colonialism, discussing issues such as white privilege, class privilege, the war on drugs, biases in the US criminal justice system, economic globalization, and US foreign policy. The name of the band is a reappropriation of the pejorative term "race traitor" used by white American racists as a reference to using one's social and economic privilege to pursue social justice. The band's members were vegan and straight edge. After they developed a profile in the U.S. hardcore scene, Racetraitor's communication style became less confrontational. In 1999, Tacoma, Washington metalcore band Botch released the song "C. Thomas Howell as the 'Soul Man'" on their 1999 album We Are the Romans, a critique of Racetraitor's attitude to race politics.

== Members ==
=== Current members ===
- Mani Mostofi – lead vocals
- Andrea Black – guitar
- Daniel Binaei – guitar
- Brent Decker – bass
- Andrew Hurley – drums

=== Former members ===
- Eric Bartholomae – guitar
- Karl Hlavinka – guitar, bass, drums (initially)
- Pete Wentz – bass
- Rich Miles – bass

== Discography ==
- Burn the Idol of the White Messiah (Uprising Records, 1998)
- Make Them Talk split EP with Burn it Down (Trustkill with vinyl released on Good Life Recordings, 1999)
- By the Time I Get to Pennsylvania EP (Organized Crime Records, 2016)
- Continuing the Tradition Demo (recorded in 1996, released by Contraband Media in 2016)
- Burn the Idol of the White Messiah: remix and remaster (Carry the Weight Records / Contraband Media, 2017)
- Invisible Battles Against Invisible Fortresses EP (Organized Crime Records, 2017)
- 2042 (Good Fight Music, 2018)
- s/t split EP with Neckbeard Deathcamp, Closet Witch, and Haggathorn (To Live a Lie Records, Ugly and Proud Records, Circus of the Macabre Records, and Moment of Collapse Records, 2020)
- s/t split EP with Chepang, (Twelve Gauge Recordings, 2022).
- Creation and the Timeless Order of Things (Good Fight Music, 2023)
