= An Anthology of Dead Ends =

EP by Botch
- Released: October 15, 2002
- Recorded: March 2002
- Studio: Studio Litho (Seattle, Washington)
- Genre: Mathcore
- Length: 21:46
- Label: Hydra Head Records (HH666-63)
- Producer: Matt Bayles and Botch

Botch chronology
We Are the Romans (1999)	An Anthology of Dead Ends (2002)	061502 (2006)

Professional ratings
Review scores
Source	Rating
Pitchfork Media	4.5/10
Exclaim!	favorable
Last Rites	favorable

An Anthology of Dead Ends is an extended play by Botch, released on Hydra Head Records in October 2002. It was the band's final studio recording, and was released after they disbanded.

The album was released on 10" vinyl and CD; a 12" version was eventually released. The CD version is an enhanced CD containing a photo gallery, a music video for "Saint Matthew Returns to the Womb" and album credits. It was released in a digipak case as well as a standard jewel case.

The song "Afghamistam" is mostly a departure from previous work, featuring subdued vocals, piano and overdubbed spoken word segments.

== Track listing ==
1. "Spaim" – 0:14
2. "Japam" – 2:51
3. "Framce" – 3:40
4. "Vietmam" – 3:59
5. "Afghamistam" – 6:57
6. "Micaragua" – 3:57

== Personnel ==
- David Verellen – vocals
- David Knudson – guitars
- Brian Cook – bass guitar, piano, backing vocals
- Tim Latona – drums
- John Pettibone – backing vocals
