= The Nightgowns =

Indie rock band from Tacoma, Washington

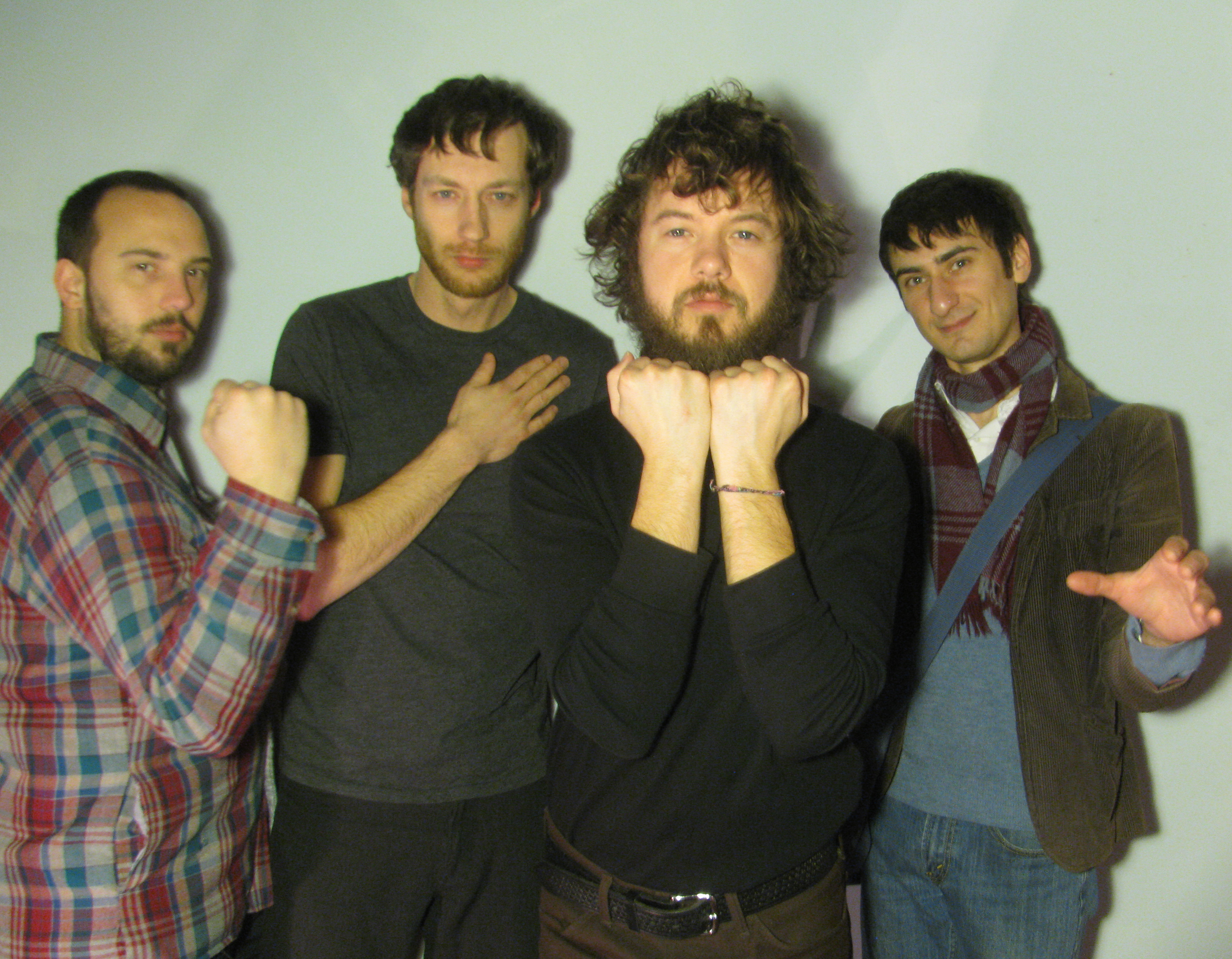

Background information
- Origin: Tacoma, Washington, United States
- Genres: Electronic, psychedelic, indie rock, pop rock
- Years active: 2008–present
- Label: Swoon Records
- Members: Trevor Dickson; Cody Jones; Kyle Brunette; B.J. Robertson

The Nightgowns are a four-piece electronic indie rock band based out of Tacoma, Washington, with members Trevor Dickson (guitar, keyboard, vocals), Cody Jones (keyboard, guitar, bass, drums, vocals), Kyle Brunette (bass, guitar, keyboard), and B.J. Robertson (drums). They were voted the "best band" in Tacoma in 2007 and 2009. The Nightgowns music is a mix of mostly uplifting, if occasionally moody, electropop, and is seemingly influenced by 1980s pop music. The band's first album experienced heavy airplay on college and independent radio, especially on Seattle station KEXP.

The Nightgowns formerly "The Elephants" (2005–2008) included member Jason Freet now of The Drug Purse. After Freet, they added members B.J. Robertson and Kyle Brunette, who is also the singer and guitarist of Tacoma rock group, Friskey.

In 2009, The Nightgowns played alongside Frank Black's Grand Duchy.

== Discography ==
- The Elephants (2005)
- The Elephants (2006)
- Sing Something (2009)
- Bonita EP (2012)
