= Tail Swallower and Dove =

Studio album by These Arms Are Snakes
- Released: October 7, 2008
- Recorded: at Red Room Studio
- Genre: Post-hardcore, art punk, progressive rock, world music
- Length: 43:53
- Label: Suicide Squeeze Records (S-078)
- Producer: Chris Common and These Arms Are Snakes

These Arms Are Snakes chronology
| Easter (2006) | Tail Swallower and Dove (2008) | PLCN/TAAS (2008) |

Professional ratings
Review scores
| Source | Rating |
|---|---|
| AllMusic | 3.5/5 stars |
| Pitchfork Media | (6.4/10) |
| Terrorizer | 8.5/10 stars |
| Pop Matters | 5/10 |
| Punk News | |

Tail Swallower and Dove is the third and final album by Seattle-based post-hardcore band These Arms Are Snakes, released on October 7, 2008, on Suicide Squeeze Records. The album was re-released in 2017 ahead of the band's reunion shows.

== Track listing ==
All tracks are written by These Arms Are Snakes.

| No. | Title | Length |
|---|---|---|
| 1. | "Woolen Heirs" | 4:15 |
| 2. | "Prince Squid" | 3:16 |
| 3. | "Red Line Season" | 2:33 |
| 4. | "Lucifer" | 2:36 |
| 5. | "Ethric Double" | 7:32 |
| 6. | "Seven Curtains" | 5:15 |
| 7. | "Long and Lonely Step" | 2:34 |
| 8. | "Lead Beater" | 4:22 |
| 9. | "Washburn" (Japan-Exclusive Bonus Track) | 3:23 |
| 10. | "Cavity Carousel" | 4:33 |
| 11. | "Briggs" | 6:52 |

== Personnel ==
=== Band members ===
- Brian Cook – bass guitar, microKORG, vocals and pump organ
- Ryan Frederiksen – guitar, pump organ and design
- Steve Snere – vocals and microKORG
- Chris Common – drums, percussion, engineering and mixing

=== Additional personnel ===
- Mark Gajadhar - Additional studio assistance
- Alicjia Trout - Additional vocals on "Red Line Season"
- John Spalding - Additional guitar on "Briggs"
- Frank McCauley - Artwork
