= Roy (band) =

- Origin: Tacoma, Washington, United States
- Genres: Folk rock, indie rock
- Years active: 2002–2006, 2010
- Labels: Fueled by Ramen, Lujo
- Past members: Brian Cook; Mike Cooper; Ben Verellen; Dave Verellen

Roy was an American folk and indie rock band. They were formed in 2002 in Tacoma, Washington.

== Background ==
The group is composed of drummer Dave Verellen and guitarist Brian Cook from the then recently disbanded mathcore group Botch (the latter of which was also in These Arms are Snakes). Roy also features Dave Verellen's brother Ben Verellen of Harkonen on guitar and bassist Mike Cooper.

After independently releasing three EPs, Roy signed to Fueled by Ramen and released their Matt Bayles-produced debut studio album Big City Sin and Small Town Redemption in 2004. In support of the album, Roy toured the US with The Weakerthans. The group went on a brief hiatus while Cook and Ben Verellen worked on These Arms are Snakes' debut album Oxeneers or the Lion Sleeps When Its Antelope Go Home. Roy returned in 2006 with a second studio album titled Killed John Train that was released through Lujo Records. The group has been mostly inactive since its release, with the exception of a show in December 2010 in their hometown of Tacoma.

In 2009, Dave Verellen noted that the members of Roy "loved that band, and we loved those songs, and we loved recording and playing together—and nobody bought the records. But that's OK. It's a tough market. I think if I would've made the mistake of trying to be in a popular band and trying to write music that I knew people would buy, I just wouldn't be happy with it."

== Discography ==
Studio albums

- Big City Sin and Small Town Redemption (2004)
- Killed John Train (2006)

EPs

- The White EP (2002)
- The Red EP (2002)
- Tacomatose (2003)
