= Count Our Numbers =

EP by Champion
- Released: May 28, 2002
- Genre: Hardcore punk
- Label: Bridge 9 Records

Champion chronology
Come Out Swinging (2000)	Count Our Numbers (2002)	Promises Kept (2004)

Count Our Numbers is an EP by Champion. It was released in 2002 on Bridge 9 Records. Bridge 9 later released this EP with Come Out Swinging as the Time Slips Away album.

== Track listing ==
1. "The Decline"
2. "Fourth Of July"
3. "Time Slips Away"
4. "Monument"
5. "One Sixteen"
6. "Is Anybody There (Alone In A Crowd)"
