= John Pettibone =

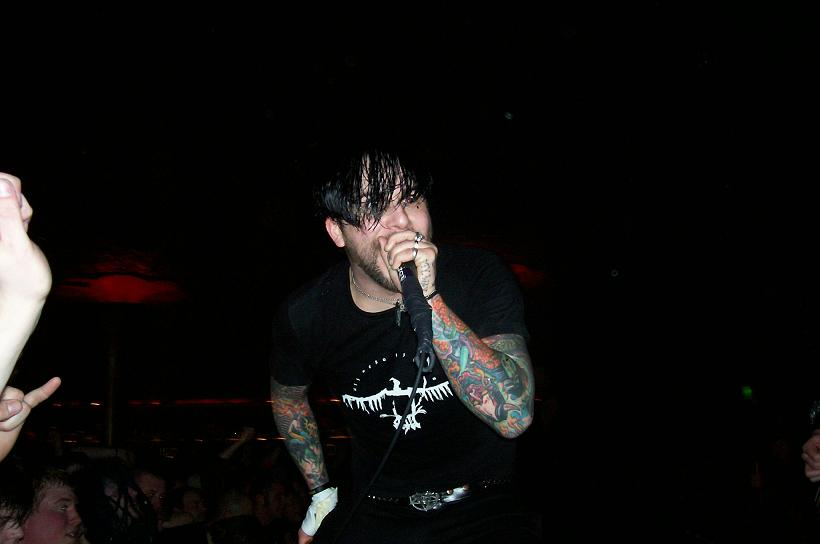
- Pettibone at the Showbox in Seattle, WA with Himsa (March 2006)

Background information
- Born: December 8, 1971 (age 54)
- Origin: Seattle, Washington
- Genres: Hardcore punk, metalcore, melodic death metal, sludge metal, post-metal
- Occupation: Musician
- Instrument: Vocals
- Years active: 1991–present
- Labels: Excursion, Indecision, Prosthetic, Dead and Gone, Goodfellow

John Pettibone is the former vocalist for the Seattle metalcore band Himsa. Before joining the band for the 2001 release of the Death Is Infinite EP, Pettibone was the lead vocalist for Undertow, a straight edge hardcore band which was also based in Seattle. He also sang for Nineironspitfire for a short time.

Pettibone is currently the lead vocalist for The Vows. The band, made up of members from other local hardcore bands such as Champion, released an EP. The Vows, in mid-2006 on Indecision Records, and the same release as a 7" on Dead and Gone Records, although not a lot has been heard of them since. In addition to his work with The Vows, Pettibone is also the vocalist in the sludge/crust influenced metal band Iamthethorn, who are signed to Goodfellow Records. This band released its first EP, You Are The Lamb on February 20, 2007.

As of December 2008, Pettibone was fronting the Seattle-based metal/experimental band, Heiress. He announced a one-off Undertow reunion show in May 2009.

Pettibone appeared on the Bleeding Through song "Rise" on the Portrait of the Goddess album. He has also contributed backing vocals on the Botch EP An Anthology Of Dead Ends, as well as the Fall From Grace single "Last Straw". More recently, Pettibone provided backing vocals on "Cutter", a track from the 2009 Converge album, Axe to Fall.

Pettibone is also currently working as production manager at El Corazon (formerly The Off Ramp) in Seattle, Washington.

== Bands ==
- Undertow (defunct)
- Nineironspitfire (defunct)
- Himsa (defunct)
- Iamthethorn (defunct)
- The Vows
- Heiress
