= Come Out Swinging =

EP by Champion
- Released: 2001
- Recorded: April 2001
- Genre: Hardcore punk
- Label: Phyte Records

Champion chronology
Come Out Swinging (2001)	Count Our Numbers (2002)

Come Out Swinging is an EP by Champion. It was released in 2001 on Phyte Records (CD) and Platinum Recordings (7" Format) and re-released in 2003 on Bridge 9 Records. It was later released with the Count Our Numbers EP as the Time Slips Away Album.

== Track listing ==
1. "Intro"
2. "Harrison And Broadway"
3. "Assume The Worst"
4. "The Insider"
5. "Left Your Mark"
6. "A Thank You Note"
7. "1 to 2 (Dag Nasty Cover, CD only)"
8. "Hidden Track (CD only)"
