= Easter (These Arms Are Snakes album) =

Studio album by These Arms Are Snakes
- Released: October 10, 2006
- Genre: Post-hardcore
- Length: 46:18
- Labels: Jade Tree Records (JT1118) (CD); Second Nature Recordings (SN066) (vinyl)
- Producers: Chris Common and These Arms Are Snakes

These Arms Are Snakes chronology
Like a Virgin (2005)	Easter (2006)	Tail Swallower and Dove (2008)

Professional ratings
Review scores
Source	Rating
AllMusic	3.5/5 stars
Aversion	4/5 stars

Easter is the second album by These Arms Are Snakes, released on October 10, 2006, on Jade Tree Records.

== Writing ==
Brian Cook contributed lyrics to the song "Perpetual Bris", which was inspired by a PBS program on the ceremony of bris. Cook saw the notion of "scarring the body of a newborn being synonymous with an act of love" as being "symbolic of most religious philosophies."

== Track listing ==
No.	Title	Length
1.	"Mescaline Eyes"	4:50
2.	"Horse Girl"	3:07
3.	"Subtle Body"	6:03
4.	"Desert Ghost"	2:18
5.	"Child Chicken Play"	3:14
6.	"Hell's Bank Notes"	0:46
7.	"Abracadabraca"	4:15
8.	"Deer Lodge"	2:54
9.	"Lady North"	3:58
10.	"Perpetual Bris"	2:17
11.	"Coporeal"	6:52
12.	"Crazy Woman Dirty Train"	5:46

Japan-Exclusive Bonus Track, Also Available On Good Friday 7"
No.	Title	Length
13.	"Old Paradise"	3:26

== Personnel ==
=== Band members ===
- Brian Cook – bass guitar, microKORG, vocals, pump organ and illustrations
- Steve Snere – vocals and microKORG
- Chris Common – drums
- Ryan Frederiksen – guitar, pump organ, art direction and design

=== Additional personnel ===
- Matt Bayles – additional guitar and percussion, production and engineering
- Ed Brooks – mastering at RFI
- Demian Johnston – Illustrations
- Robin Laananen - Photography

== Vinyl information ==
1st Press:

- 400 Clear
- 400 Opaque Yellow/Black
- 400 Translucent Red/Black Splatter
- 400 Opaque Red/Blue

2nd Press:

- 345 Magenta w/ White Splatter
- 220 Orange w/ White/Blue/Black Splatter (Screenprinted Covers)
