= Shake Harder Boy =

Studio album by Harkonen
- Released: November 26, 2002
- Studio: Studio Litho, Avast! Recording Co.
- Genre: Sludge metal, math rock
- Length: 27:10
- Label: Hydra Head Records
- Producer: Matt Bayles and Harkonen

Harkonen chronology
Grizz (2001)	Shake Harder Boy (2002)	Dancing (2003)

Professional ratings
Review scores
Source	Rating
AllMusic	2/5 stars

Shake Harder Boy is an album by the American post-hardcore band Harkonen. It was released in 2002 by Hydra Head Records.

== Track listing ==
All tracks written by Harkonen.

1. "Smile Pretty" – 1:43
2. "Baristas Get Stalked" – 3:35
3. "Bargains Only" – 3:47
4. "Caseydriver" – 2:29
5. "We've Come for Your Daughters" – 3:12
6. "Easy Prey" – 3:18
7. "All This Time I Thought Your Name Was Cool Dude" – 2:27
8. "The Burly Spur" – 4:31
9. "Your Name is Shit" – 2:17
10. "Introducing the Creeker Sneaker" – 3:06
11. "Settle Here" – 5:29
