= Helms Alee =

American rock/metal band

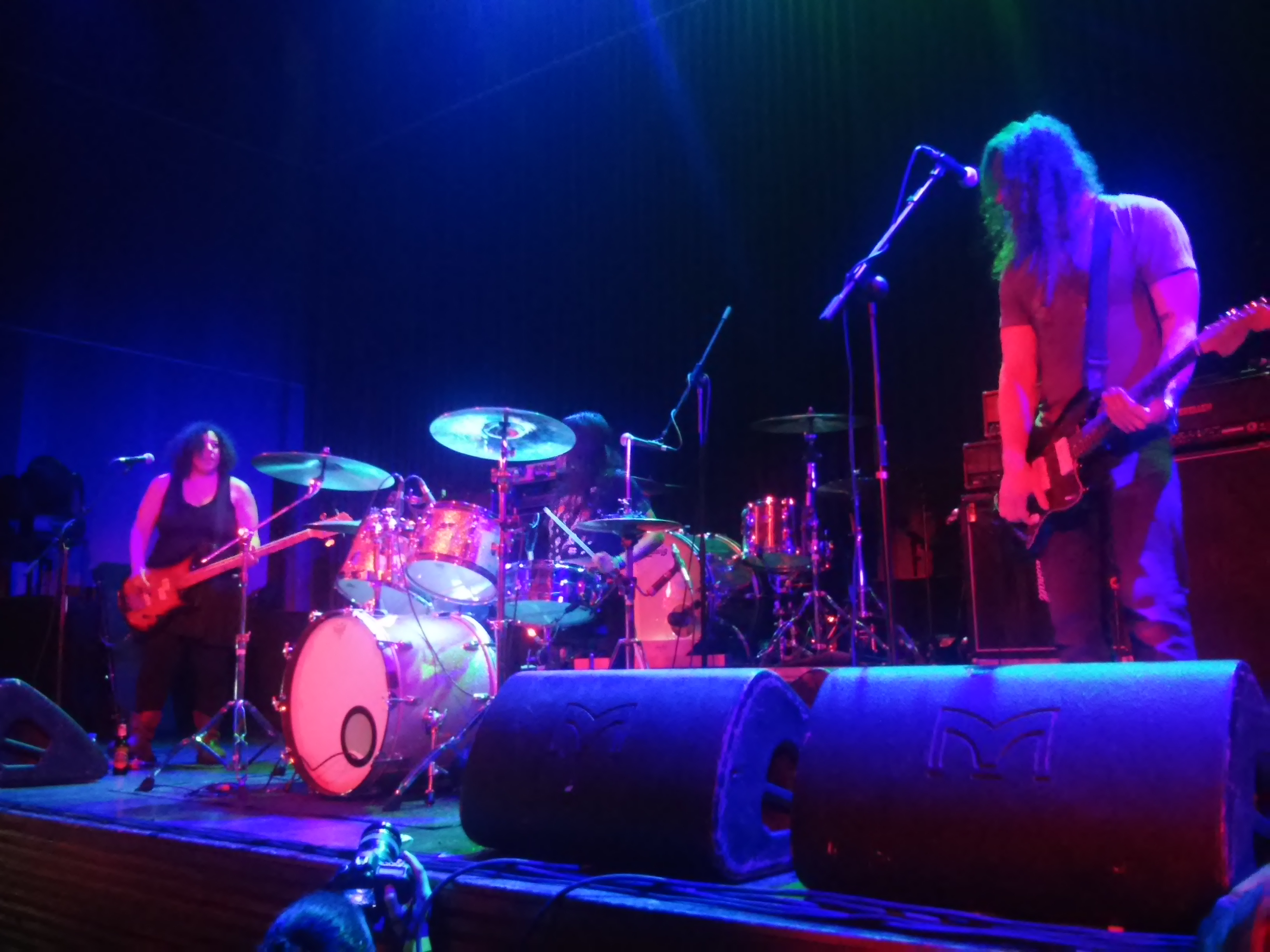
- Helms Alee in Santiago de Compostela, 2015

Background information
- Origin: Seattle, Washington, U.S.
- Genres: Sludge metal, noise rock, post-hardcore
- Years active: 2007–present
- Labels: Hydra Head, Sargent House

Helms Alee is an American rock band that formed in 2007. Based in Seattle, Helms Alee features Ben Verellen, former member of Harkonen and Roy. Helms Alee has released six albums, Night Terror (2008) and Weatherhead (2011) through Hydra Head Records, and Sleepwalking Sailors (2014), Stillicide (2016), Noctiluca (2019) and Keep This Be the Way (2022) through Sargent House (to which the band signed in 2013). "Helms Alee" is a nautical term, included in the commands for tacking a sailboat.

== Band members ==
- Dana James – bass guitar, backing vocals (2007-present)
- Hozoji Matheson-Margullis – drums, vocals (2007-present)
- Ben Verellen – guitar, vocals (2007-present)

== Discography ==
Studio albums

- Night Terror (2008, Hydra Head)
- Weatherhead (2011, Hydra Head)
- Sleepwalking Sailors (2014, Sargent House)
- Stillicide (2016, Sargent House)
- Noctiluca (2019, Sargent House)
- Keep This Be the Way (2022, Sargent House)

Extended plays and splits

- Helms Alee (2007, Rome Plow)
- All About Friends Forever: Volume 4 (2013, independent)
- Helms Alee / Ladder Devils (2013, Brutal Panda)
- Helms Alee / Tacos! (2013, Violent Hippy)
- Helms Alee / Young Widows 12" (2014, Sargent House)

Singles

- "Lionize" / "Truely" (2008, Hydra Head)
