= Champion (band) =

American hardcore punk band

- Origin: Seattle, Washington, U.S.
- Genres: Hardcore punk, melodic hardcore
- Years active: 1999–2006
- Labels: Platinum, Dead and Gone, Bridge 9
- Past members: Jim Hesketh; Aram Arslanian; Chris Williams; Todd Preboski; Andy Norton

Champion was an American straight edge hardcore punk band formed by vocalist Jim Hesketh and guitarist Chris Williams in the spring of 1999 in Seattle, Washington.

== History ==
Jim and Chris formed Champion and after a few months of shows, the band released its first demo on cassette and went on a West Coast tour of the United States. In the early days, the band was plagued with constant line-up changes, but in 2000 the majority of the core lineup came together to release the Come Out Swinging EP on Platinum Recordings (Germany).

After playing with American Nightmare Timbomb suggested Chris Wrenn of Bridge Nine Records check out the band. After a couple of calls, Champion joined the label Bridge 9 Records and recorded another EP, entitled Count Our Numbers, followed by the re-release of Come Out Swinging. They toured hard on these records and traveled with American Nightmare, Death Threat, The First Step, Comeback Kid, Terror, Slapshot, and Sick of It All. They toured all over the US, Europe, Japan, Australia, and South Korea.

Champion's full-length LP, Promises Kept, was released on Bridge 9 Records. Right after this Andy joined and completed the core lineup of the band. After a second European tour and an Australian leg, Champion toured the United States in early 2005. "In the spring they were to become one of the first Western independent act to visit the famous country of South Korea where Kill Your Idols and Ensign also played around 2001." 2005 also saw the band re-release their previous two EPs on one CD, entitled Time Slips Away.

The band announced through Bridge 9 on January 31, 2006, that they were disbanding, with a final show that occurred on May 27, 2006, at El Corazon in their hometown of Seattle, Washington. Their reasoning for breaking up can be found on their MySpace page. Here is a small excerpt:

With all the pressure to do another record and to tour, it wasn't what we "wanted" to do anymore; it was what we "had" to do. So before making any commitments that we would be bounded to, we decided to end it now, while everyone in the band was still friends and still loved everything we did as a band together. NO ONE SOLD OUT.

Since the breakup, all of the members of Champion have continued to be active in the punk/hardcore scene. Aram Arslanian played guitar in The First Step, The Vows, sang for Betrayed, and ran REACT! Records. He recently plays guitar in True Identity, Keep It Clear and plays bass in Union of Faith. Chris Williams sings in Dead Weight and played guitar The Vows, The Poverty Bay Saints, and The Crew as well as bass in Gone But Not Forgotten. Vocalist Jim Hesketh sang in ON and True Identity, who disbanded following accusations of sexual assault and rape from multiple women, all of whom were children at the time of the alleged assaults. Todd Preboski played drums in Betrayed and Lonewolf. Andy Norton played in Time to Escape and Warpriest currently sings in Praise and plays bass in Nerve Endings and Peace.

In 2020, Aram Arslanian formed the band CHANGE, who released the LP "Closer Still" on React! Records. Chris Williams performs live with the band.

== Members ==
Final lineup

- Jim Hesketh – vocals
- Aram Arslanian – guitar
- Chris Williams – guitar
- Todd Preboski – drums
- Andy Norton – bass

Former members

- Ben Colton – bass
- Eagle Barber – guitar
- Timm McIntosh – guitar
- Joe Preston – drums
- Jeff Boltz – drums
- Nikki Platter – drums
- Sean Spear – bass
- Brandon Wallace – drums

== Discography ==
=== Albums ===
- Promises Kept (Bridge 9 Records, 2004)

=== Demo ===
- Demo Tape (1999)

=== EPs ===
- Come Out Swinging (Platinum Records, 2000)
- Count Our Numbers (Bridge 9 Records, 2002)
- Champion/Betrayed split EP (Rivalry Records, 2006)

=== Compilations ===
- Time Slips Away (Bridge 9 Records, 2005)

=== Live ===
- Different Directions (Bridge 9 Records, 2007)
