= Bullet Union =

- Origin: London
- Genres: Noise rock, Punk rock
- Years active: 2003 – 2006

Bullet Union were a punk band based in Camden Town, London. Their sound was influenced by Drive Like Jehu, Sonic Youth and Unwound.

== History ==
The band formed in late 2002 by ex-members of the hardcore bands Dead Inside and Ursa and current members of Comet Gain and Shoe!. They released one studio album, Ruin's Domino, and one single "Stay Indie, Don't Be a Hater". John Peel played the band several times. Bullet Union toured the UK in 2004 with Q and Not U and Europe with The Blood Brothers in 2005. They disbanded in April 2006 after completing a headline tour of Europe.

== Releases ==
=== Single ===
2003

"Stay Indie, Don't Be a Hater / 'Robin...I'll Be Back in Five Minutes" - 7" single on Jealous Records. Two pressings - 500 white vinyl / 500 pink vinyl

=== Studio Album ===
2004

Ruins Domino - CD / LP - on Jealous Records. The LP version features a bonus track, a cover of "He's Waiting" by The Sonics. Original artwork for the album was drawn by the 'Biff' cartoonist Chris Garratt.

== Line Up ==
- Jodie William Cox – Vocals / Guitar
- Kaoru Ishikawa – Bass
- Paul Jonathan Symes – Guitar
- Robin Silas Christian – Drums
