= Oxeneers or the Lion Sleeps When Its Antelope Go Home =

Studio album by These Arms Are Snakes
- Released: September 21, 2004
- Recorded: at Litho and Spectre South
- Genre: Post-hardcore, alternative metal
- Length: 46:38
- Label: Jade Tree Records (JT1097) (CD); Second Nature Recordings (SN056) (vinyl)
- Producer: Matt Bayles and These Arms Are Snakes

These Arms Are Snakes chronology
This Is Meant to Hurt You (2003)	Oxeneers or the Lion Sleeps When Its Antelope Go Home (2004)	Like a Virgin (2005)

Professional ratings
Aggregate scores
Source	Rating
Metacritic	65/100
Review scores
Source	Rating
AllMusic	3.5/5 stars
Pitchfork Media	(7.6/10)
Tiny Mix Tapes	5/5 stars
Sputnikmusic	3.5/5 stars

Oxeneers or the Lion Sleeps When Its Antelope Go Home is the debut album by Seattle-based post-hardcore band These Arms Are Snakes, released on September 21, 2004, on Jade Tree Records.

== Track listing ==
All tracks are written by These Arms Are Snakes.

No.	Title	Length
1.	"The Shit Sisters"	3:34
2.	"Angela's Secret"	3:34
3.	"Big News"	3:18
4.	"Tracing"	1:18
5.	"Your Pearly Whites"	4:51
6.	"Gadget Arms"	8:09
7.	"Greetings from the Great North Woods"	4:28
8.	"La Stanza Bianca"	3:41
9.	"Darlings of New Midnight"	4:11
10.	"Oxeneer"	0:57
11.	"Idaho"	8:39

- "Idaho" ends at 5:35. An untitled hidden track starts at 6:36.
- The Japanese pressing of the album includes the EP This Is Meant To Hurt You as bonus tracks.

== Personnel ==
=== Band members ===
- Brian Cook – bass guitar, microKORG, vocals and pump organ
- Ryan Frederiksen – guitar, pump organ and design
- Steve Snere – vocals and microKORG
- Erin Tate – drums and percussion

=== Additional personnel ===
- Matt Bayles – additional guitar and percussion, production and engineering
- Alan Douches – mastering at West West Side Music
- Derik Frederikson – recording assistance
- Mark Gajadhar – additional drums
- Demian Johnston – additional guitar
- Dave Knudson – additional guitar
- Ben Verellen – additional bass
- Robin Laananen - Photography

== Vinyl information ==
1st Press:

- 547 Translucent Red Marble
- 546 White
- 549 Opaque Royal Blue

2nd Press:

- 314 Translucent Blue
