= Different Directions (Champion album) =

Different Directions DVD/CD

Live album by Champion
- Released: March 17, 2007
- Genre: Hardcore punk
- Length: 35:55
- Label: Bridge 9 Records

Champion chronology
Time Slips Away (2005)	Different Directions DVD/CD (2007)

Professional ratings
Review scores
Source	Rating
AllMusic	3.5/5 stars

Different Directions is a DVD/CD combo by Champion released in March, 2007. It documents their history and includes a DVD of their last show, interviews, and early band discography.

== Track listing ==
1. "Promises Kept"
2. "4th Of July"
3. "Decisions Made"
4. "Different Directions"
5. "Monument"
6. "The Decline"
7. "The Truth"
8. "Time Slips Away"
9. "Thank You Note"
10. "Perspective"
11. "Assume the Worst"
12. "The Insider"
13. "One Sixteen"
14. "Next Year"
