= These Arms Are Snakes =

American post-hardcore band

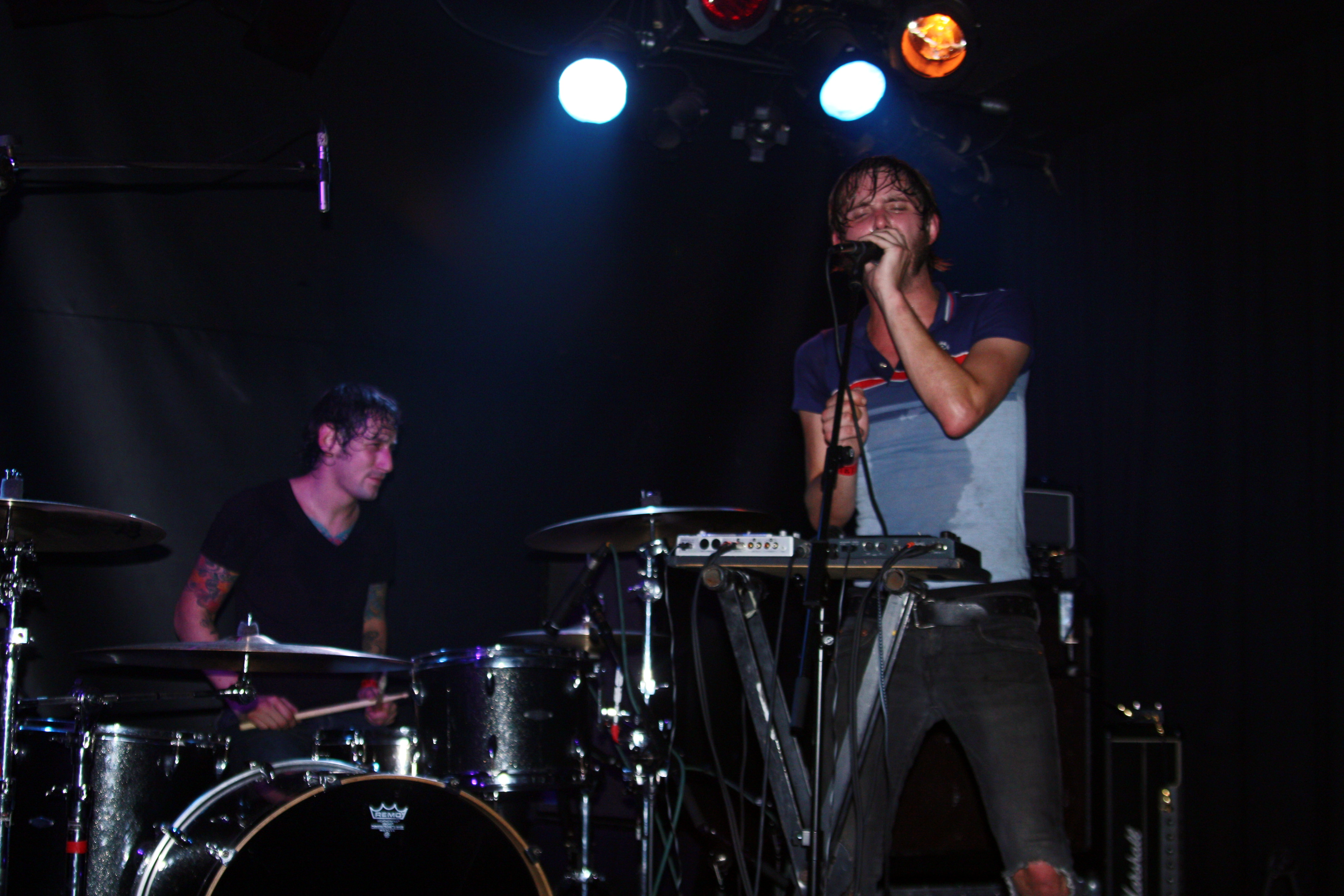
- These Arms Are Snakes performing live in Barcelona. Visible are vocalist Steve Snere and drummer Chris Common.

Background information
- Origin: Seattle, Washington, United States
- Genres: Post-hardcore; sass; noise rock
- Years active: 2002–2009; 2016; 2021
- Labels: Suicide Squeeze, Jade Tree, Mind Over Matter
- Past members: Chris Common; Brian Cook; Ryan Frederiksen; Joe Preston; Bill Quinby; Jesse Robertson; Steve Snere; Erin Tate; Ben Verellen

These Arms Are Snakes was an American post-hardcore band that formed in 2002 and featured former members of Botch and Kill Sadie. Before disbanding in 2009, they released three studio albums: Oxeneers or the Lion Sleeps When Its Antelope Go Home (2004), Easter (2006) and Tail Swallower and Dove (2008). Former members of These Arms Are Snakes currently play in Russian Circles, Narrows, Minus the Bear, Crypts, Dust Moth, and Hooves.

They toured with the bands Minus the Bear, Big Business, Mastodon, Cursive, The Blood Brothers, Engine Down, Hot Water Music, Isis, Pelican, Chiodos, and Against Me!.

== History ==
=== Formation (2002–2003) ===
The band formed as a five-piece in 2002 with Steve Snere of Kill Sadie, Brian Cook of Botch, and Ryan Frederiksen of Nineironspitfire in addition to Joe Preston and Jesse Robertson. They chose the name "These Arms Are Snakes" as their band name because it was "ridiculous and [didn't] really sound like any other band name that's out there." The group announced that they had signed to Jade Tree Records in March 2003, and released their debut EP This Is Meant to Hurt You on August 19, 2003. This was the only release with a full-time keyboardist, as Jesse Robertson left the band in 2004 after having differences in opinion about the group's touring style. AllMusic rated the debut EP three stars out of five and called the lyrics "smart [and] cunning."

They continued as a four-piece band from this point forward. Before recording their follow-up album to This Is Meant to Hurt You, Joe Preston also left the group and was replaced by Erin Tate who played in Kill Sadie with Steve Snere and Minus the Bear. Preston and other members of These Arms Are Snakes got into a van accident with a semi-truck following his farewell show.

=== Oxeneers (2004–2005) ===
Brian Cook would still occasionally perform keys throughout the remainder of the group's existence. According to Ryan Frederiksen, this move opened up more space on stage allowing them to "run free across the whole stage," allowing for a more intense live show. The loss of Robertson also allowed These Arms Are Snakes to focus on their overall sound and create "stripped-down, spacious arrangements." These changes impacted their debut full-length Oxeneers or the Lion Sleeps When Its Antelope Go Home (often referred to more simply as either The Lion Sleeps or Oxeneers) released through Jade Tree in September 2004.

In support of Oxeneers, These Arms Are Snakes joined the "Totally Badical Tour" with headliner Underoath and openers The Chariot, Hopesfall, and Fear Before the March of Flames. The band was not warmly received on this tour. Audience members bought merchandise, though according to the group this felt more like an "empty gesture." Band members also experienced friction between themselves and some of the other bands on the tour. The members of Underoath were at the time ardent Christians, openly expressing their thoughts on religion and politics and frequently conflicting with the ideals of These Arms Are Snakes.

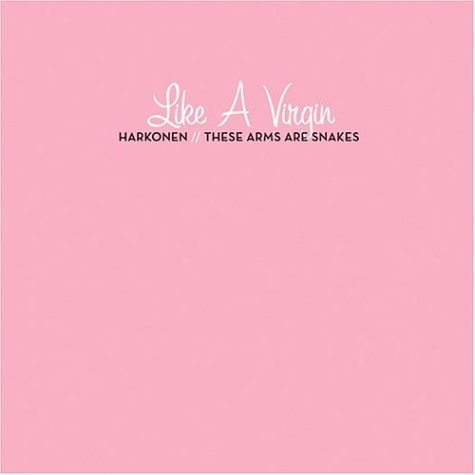
Artwork of Like a Virgin (EP)

These Arms Are Snakes followed up their debut album with Like a Virgin, a split EP with Seattle group Harkonen through Hydra Head Records and Mind Over Matter Records. The EP featured two new tracks from both bands, and one track written and performed by both groups. This would be the second and final release with drummer Erin Tate, who was replaced by Ben Verellen in 2005 before going on tour with Minus the Bear. One of the tracks included is "Touched for the Very First Time" in collaboration with the band Harkonen.

=== Easter (2006–2007) ===
Verellen quit the band without an explanation given in 2005, and was quickly replaced by drummer and producer Chris Common. Ben Verellen would later go on to join Helms Alee and form his own amplifier company called Verellen Amplifiers. The group's previous conflicts with Underoath would loosely inspire their second studio album, Easter, released through Jade Tree in 2006. While These Arms Are Snakes weren't trying to make a public statement about organized religion, themes about religion (most notably on "Perpetual Bris") were present. A more prominent lyrical theme throughout Easter was vocalist Steve Snere trying to examine the "bigger picture" of life and existence.

At the end of 2006, they toured in support of their new album with Thrice, Planes Mistaken for Stars, Mouth of the Architect and Young Widows. In early 2007, These Arms Are Snakes did a small headlining tour in Europe with various bands, and returned to America to open for Against Me! and Mastodon.

=== Tail Swallower and Dove (2008–2009) ===
For their third studio album, These Arms Are Snakes signed to Suicide Squeeze Records—a label that far better supported the band than their previous record label, Jade Tree. Over their former label, they praised Suicide Squeeze's treatment of the band and ability to market and sell records, in addition to being with more familiar groups like Minus the Bear. Tail Swallower and Dove was released in October 2008. It was again produced by Chris Common and was only recorded in one month—the shortest recording period of an album for the group. The album was seen as a departure from their more hardcore-sounding songs and took a more experimental approach, and also more traditional song structures.

During this period, These Arms Are Snakes also released a number of split releases. They released Pelican / These Arms Are Snakes, a split release with Pelican through Hydra Head. A limited edition 12-inch split with Cook's side project Russian Circles was released on tour, and a split with Tropics, Meet Your Mayor / Future Gets Tense was also made in limited quantities. The band's final release before disbanding was a split single with All the Saints, which was originally released as a limited edition 7-inch vinyl through Touch and Go Records, but later released as a digital download. Their contributed track "Washburn" was recorded during the Tail Swallower and Dove sessions.

=== Break up (2009–2010) ===
On December 25, 2009 These Arms Are Snakes announced that they had broken up. The band had been inactive since late 2009 with most of the members focusing on their respective side projects. Guitarist Ryan Frederiksen had formed Narrows in 2008 with former Botch vocalist Dave Verellen and released their debut album New Distances in May 2009. Bassist Brian Cook focused on Russian Circles who had released their third album Geneva in October 2009. Prior to disbanding, These Arms Are Snakes had expressed interest in taking their music in a new direction for a potential fourth studio album, with writing and recording expected to begin in December 2009.

Also in 2009, the group announced they had recorded tracks for a split with Minus the Bear and a compilation covers album paying tribute to Nirvana's In Utero—both of which were unreleased at the time of the band's break up. After seven years of "extended delays and legal wrangling," Robotic Empire released In Utero, in Tribute, in Entirety on Record Store Day 2014, which features These Arms Are Snakes' cover of Nirvana's "Heart-Shaped Box." The split EP with Minus the Bear failed to materialize, so the band decided to use the track intended for that release — a cover of Lost Sounds' song "Energy Drink and the Long Walk Home" — for a split release with The Coathangers instead, which was released in December 2014. Cook said he thought that with the exception of a 4-song demo recorded before This Is Meant to Hurt You, the Lost Sounds cover was the final recorded but unreleased material from These Arms Are Snakes.

Since disbanding, These Arms Are Snakes have performed two reunion shows: a secret reunion show in Seattle on December 29, 2016 and a publicly announced show in Seattle on August 28, 2021.

In April 2022, These Arms Are Snakes released Duct Tape & Shivering Crows through Suicide Squeeze. The album compiles all of the band's non-album tracks, split EP songs and compilation contributions, in addition to the band's unreleased original four-song demo recorded before This Is Meant to Hurt You.

== Members ==
Final lineup

- Steve Snere – vocals, MicroKORG (2002–2009)
- Ryan Frederiksen – guitar, MicroKORG, didgeridoo (2002–2009)
- Brian Cook– bass guitar, pump organ, MicroKORG (2002–2009)
- Chris Common – drums (2005–2009)

Former members

- Bill Quinby – guitar (2002)
- Joe Preston – drums (2002–2004)
- Jesse Robertson – keyboards (2002–2004)
- Erin Tate – drums (2004–2005)
- Ben Verellen – drums (2005)

Timeline

== Discography ==
=== Studio albums ===
- Oxeneers or the Lion Sleeps When Its Antelope Go Home (Jade Tree, 2004)
- Easter (Jade Tree, 2006)
- Tail Swallower and Dove (Suicide Squeeze, 2008)

=== EPs ===
- This Is Meant to Hurt You (Jade Tree, 2003)

=== Split albums ===
- Like a Virgin (Split with Harkonen) (Hydra Head/Mind Over Matter, 2004)
- PLCN/TAAS (Split with Pelican) (Hydra Head, 2008)
- Russian Circles / These Arms Are Snakes 12" (Split with Russian Circles) (Sargent House, 2008)
- Meet Your Mayor / Future Gets Tense 7" (Split with Tropics) (We-Be, 2008)
- All the Saints / These Arms Are Snakes 7" (Split with All the Saints) (Touch and Go, 2009)
- The Coathangers / These Arms Are Snakes (Split with The Coathangers) (Suicide Squeeze, 2014)

=== Singles ===
- Good Friday 7" (Suicide Squeeze, 2006)

=== Compilation albums ===
- Duct Tape & Shivering Crows (Suicide Squeeze, 2022)

=== Music videos ===
Year	Song	Album
2006	"Horse Girl"	Easter
2009	"Red Line Season"	Tail Swallower and Dove

=== Other contributions ===
Year	Contributed song	Album	Label
2006	"Old Paradise"	Slaying Since 1996	Suicide Squeeze
2014	"Heart-Shaped Box"	In Utero, in Tribute, in Entirety	Robotic Empire
