= Undertow (band) =

Straight edge hardcore punk band

- Origin: Seattle, Washington
- Genres: Hardcore punk, metalcore
- Years active: 1991–2004
- Labels: Indecision Records; Overkill Records; Excursion Records; Bloodlink Records
- Members: John Pettibone; Mark Holcomb; Demian Johnston; Ryan Murphy
- Past members: Joel DeGraff; Seth Linstrum; James Stern

Undertow was a straight edge hardcore punk and metalcore band from Seattle, Washington, active from 1991 to 2004. They released material on Indecision Records, Bloodlink Records, Excursion Records, and Overkill Records. Indecision Records released a comprehensive discography entitled Everything, which contains 28 tracks spanning Undertow's entire active period with John Pettibone on vocals. RevHQ described them as "founding fathers of Seattle straight edge".

== History ==
Undertow formed in Seattle as part of the early straight edge hardcore scene. They released several demos, vinyls, and full-length recordings, including splits with Resolution and Struggle. Their music combined aggressive hardcore punk with elements of metalcore, influencing other Seattle straight edge bands in the 1990s.

== Members ==
- John Pettibone – vocals
- Mark Holcomb – guitar
- Demian Johnston – bass
- Ryan Murphy – drums

Former

- Joel DeGraff – vocals
- Seth Linstrum – guitar
- James Stern – bass

== Discography ==
- Undertow 1990 Demo (Cassette, Self-Released)
- The Extinction of All That Is Holy (7" Vinyl, Overkill Records)
- Conditioned - Undertow/Resolution split (7" Vinyl, Overkill Records)
- Edge of Quarrel (7" Vinyl, 1991, Overkill Records)
- Undertow 1992 Demo (Cassette, Self-Released)
- Undertow/Struggle Split (7" Vinyl, 1993, Bloodlink Records)
- Stalemate (CDEP/7" Vinyl, 1993, Excursion Records)
- At Both Ends (CD/LP, 1994, Excursion Records)
- Control (CDEP/7" Vinyl, 1994, Overkill Records)
- Undertow (7" Vinyl, 2004, Indecision Records)
- Everything Discography (CD/2xLP, 2004, Indecision Records)
- WSPC 1993 Live Performance (Cassette, 2012, Dead Accents)
