= Harkonen (band) =

American post-hardcore band

Background information
- Origin: Tacoma, Washington, U.S.
- Genres: Post-hardcore; sludge metal; math rock
- Years active: 1997–2005
- Labels: Hydra Head, Initial, Mind Over Matter
- Past members: Ben Verellen; Matt Howard; Casey Hardy; Aaron Connell; Bill Quinby; Chris Vancourt; Mike Jones

Harkonen was an American post-hardcore band from Tacoma, Washington, most active between 1997 and 2005.

== History ==
Harkonen began around 1997 originally as a five-piece that played noisy hardcore similar to artists such as Deadguy and Kiss It Goodbye. Their formative years were tumultuous and keeping a steady line-up proved difficult. After recording their self-titled single in 1997, the band were reduced to a four-piece following the departure of guitarist Chris Vancourt and vocalist Mike Jones, and it marked the addition of vocalist Aaron Connell (formerly of Grip and Christ and later went on to found Himsa and Iamthethorn). Shortly after releasing their single "Hung to Dry", vocalist Aaron Connell and short-lived guitarist Niehl Brady departed, leaving the band a three-piece, with Ben and Bill taking on the vocal role. Some time after, guitarist Bill Quinby also left and was replaced by Casey Hardy. This lineup of Verellen, Howard and Hardy would prove to be the band's most enduring line-up.

After constantly changing labels and slowly changing their overall sound into a more noise rock outfit (points of reference include Scratch Acid and Nirvana), Harkonen landed on national label Hydra Head Records where they released the Grizz record as well as Shake Harder Boy and their collaboration with These Arms Are Snakes (with whom Verellen lent his guitar skills), Like a Virgin. This gave them more exposure and allowed them to embark on national tours with Isis and other Hydra Head Records bands.

Harkonen also began to lose inspiration around the recording of their final EP, Dancing and the band called it a day sometime in 2005. They recorded several more records prior to their breaking up which were released right around and just after the band disbanded. The band's last show was at the Seattle music festival Bumbershoot in 2005.

Ben Verellen has confirmed in interviews that the band's name was taken from that of the fictitious House Harkonnen from Frank Herbert's Dune series.

== Members ==
=== Final line-up ===
- Ben Verellen – bass and vocals
- Casey Hardy – guitar and vocals
- Matt Howard – drums

=== Former members ===
- Aaron "Edge" Connell – vocals (1997 – c.1999)
- Neihl Brady- guitar (1998 – c.1999)
- Bill Quinby – guitar (? – c.1999)
- Chris Vancourt – guitar (? – 1997)
- Mike Jones – vocals (? – 1997)

== Discography ==
- Harkonen 7" (Unjust, 1997)
- Hung to Dry 7" (Excursion, 1998)
  - Limited to 1000 copies
- Demo CD (1998)
- Harkonen CD (Wreck-Age, 1999) – the first full-length album by Harkonen. It is the first recording by the band as a three piece, the configuration that the band would keep for the remainder of its existence.
- Charge! CD (Ataque Sonoro, 2000)
- Grizz CD/7" (Hydra Head Records, 2001)
- Shake Harder Boy CD (Hydra Head Records, 2002)
- Dancing CD (Initial Records, 2003)
- Split w/ Breather Resist 7" (Happy Couples Never Last, 2004)
- Like a Virgin CD (split EP with These Arms Are Snakes) (Hydra Head Records/Mind Over Matter Records, 2005)

== Related bands ==
- Helms Alee – Ben Verellen
- Roy – Ben Verellen
- Grip – Aaron "Edge" Connell
- Himsa – Aaron "Edge" Connell
