= Dave Verellen =

American singer

Dave Verellen is an American singer. He grew up in Tacoma, Washington, and was the vocalist for the mathcore band Botch. He has since gone on to play drums for the folk-country band Roy with his brother Ben Verellen of Harkonen. In 2008 he formed the band Narrows with members of Some Girls and These Arms Are Snakes.

Verellen recorded backing vocals for the Canadian noise rock band KEN mode's 2013 album Entrench.
