= Mas alla de los Gritos =

Mas alla de los Gritos (Beyond the Screams) is a 1999 documentary film featuring the Latino/Chicano punk movement from the late 1970s up until the early 1990s. Producer Martin Sorrondeguy singer of hardcore punk bands Los Crudos and Limp Wrist, also founder of record label, Lengua Armada Discos, documentary film director and a prominent figure in both the straight edge scene and the queercore scene, illustrates the repurposing and remixing of punk music in the major Latino cities on the U.S. This one of a kind documentary sheds light on the political D.I.Y. philosophy which aims to empower youth to emancipate themselves from society's oppression. The film is composed of interviews and live performances. The film focuses on the struggle of Latino/Chicano against globalization, poverty, and identity.

== Overview ==
The following bands are featured in this film: Los Crudos (Chicago), Huasipungo (New York), No less (El Paso Texas), Kontra Attaque (L.A), Tras de nada (Chicago), Subsitencia (L.A.), Logical Nonsense,(Santa Fe New Mexico), SBitch (El Paso Texas), Life's Halt ( L.A.), Youth Against, (Chicago). These bands that emerged during the early 1990s were politically resistant to border brutality, Chican@/Latin@ identity in the barrio, transborder struggles, Pete Wilson and the passing of Prop 187, NAFTA, the uprising of the Zapatista army in Mexico, Xenophobia, the Berkeley Pro-Affirmative Action Rally, police brutality, discrimination and racism amongst other social issues. This customization of the Chican@/Latin@ punk scene emerges from the transculturation of Latin American punk in countries with strong influence such as Brazil, Colombia, Mexico, and Argentina.Through this cultural hybridization, unrepresented youth form groups that fight against globalization.

This film narrates the Chicano/Latino punk scene which is said to have exploded in Los Angeles during the late 1970s. bands began organizing gigs in their own community at a place called The Vex which was located in East Los Angeles. Popularly coined as the East L.A. renaissance of 1976, many Latino/Chicano punk bands were formed around this community. Some of the most popular bands of the times were: The Plugz, Bags, The Brat, The Zeros, Felix and the Catz, Stains, Los Angelinos. These bands were some of the first bands to create local punk in East L.A. which followed a new style of punk more like the political punk that was coming out of Latin American countries. This new customization of punk includes transnational struggles as well as local which reforms the notion of conventional punk rock music.

== Awards ==
- Premio Mesquite Award, Best First Film, CineFestival

== See also ==
- Latino punk
