= Lesser of Two =

American band

Lesser Of Two
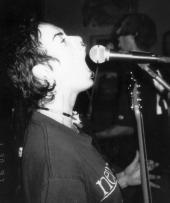
- Lesser Of Two live

Background information
- Origin: Fort Walton Beach, Florida, United States
- Genres: Hardcore punk, thrash metal
- Years active: 1989–2002
- Labels: D.I.Y., Nikt Nic Nie Wie, Malarie, Terrorismo Sonora, Estajanovismo Records
- Past members: Steven DeCaprio; Kelly Nelson; Moses Saarni; Dave Earles; Rob "Trans Am" Coleman; Joel "Buddy" Purdue; Isaac Grant; Stacey Storer; Ash Miller; James Diederich
- Website: http://lesseroftwo.bandcamp.com http://www.myspace.com/lesseroftwo http://lesseroftwo.tripod.com/

Lesser of Two was an American crossover thrash, screamo and hardcore punk band which began in Florida in 1989 and relocated to Oakland, California in 1997. Lesser of Two disbanded in 2003.

== History ==
Steven DeCaprio came up with the name during a hallucination while skateboarding in a strip mall. He became transfixed on the two competing brands of soda dispensers sitting side by side next to the grocery store. In those two "choices" the false dichotomy inspired the name. In it choice, freedom, democracy, etc. were mere illusions used to fool the masses.

Ash Miller (second guitarist on Swing) told him that the name "Lesser of Two Evils" was too long. Soon after, DeCaprio was kicked out of the band because he was incompetent as a musician. He kept the name with a new band including Isaac Grant, Mike Shuman and Rob Coleman.

The volatility of line-ups became a hallmark of the band from then on. From 1989 until 2002 the band had seven bass players, seven drummers, two guitarists, and six vocalists. The only thing that did not change was the band name.

In 1995 Nelson, DeCaprio's wife, officially joined the band and played bass until the end. They appear on all the recordings except the Swing 7" and a track on the Farmhouse 1994 compilation album.

Over the years Lesser Of Two released three singles, three albums, and were on a number of compilations. Lesser of Two toured extensively in the United States as well as Mexico, Canada, Germany, Poland, Czech Republic, Slovakia, Slovenia, Italy, Switzerland, Belgium, France, Spain, Austria, and Netherlands. They accomplished all this while maintaining a Do It Yourself (D.I.Y.) ethic. In 1999, Lesser of Two released a cassette tape version of their self-titled album on one of the oldest punk labels in Poland, Nikt Nic Nie Wie. They were featured in the Polish Magazine Pasazer No. 13-14 which included a compilation featuring a track from Lesser Of Two.

Lesser Of Two also joined with seminal Polish punk band Post Regiment for a leg of their tour.

== Musical style ==
Lesser Of Two's music had a crust punk sound without following any rules of the genre. The music was characterized by incredibly fast tempos giving way to slower heavier parts. The music was also accompanied with screaming vocals, crazy noise, and political lyrics with an emphasis on the negative aspects of human existence.

Lesser Of Two was given positive reviews by Maximumrocknroll magazine, Flipside fanzine, Slug and Lettuce fanzine, HeartattaCk magazine, and many others for their albums and their performances.

== Notable concerts ==
During the over decade Lesser Of Two was active they played many notable concerts.

- February 3, 1993 with Born Against Pensacola, FL
- May 28, 1994 with Los Crudos, Apocalypse Hoboken, and many more Hardcore Against Hunger at Scrap Skate Park: 2350 Hassel, Hoffman Estates
- December 20, 1995 with Right Turn Clyde at Oak Park House, Corpus Christi, TX
- July 13, 1996 with Shades Apart, Dillinger Four, at 924 Gilman, Berkeley, CA
- July 30, 1996 with Los Crudos, See In Red, Torches To Rome, and Palatka at the Fireside Bowl, Chicago, IL
- August 9, 1996 with Jesuit, Racetraitor, Seein' Red, Torches to Rome, Palatka and more Greenville, NC
- June 20, 1998 with Cavity at Joe's house in San Jose, CA
- July 26, 1998 with From Ashes Rise at Warm Water Cove, San Francisco, CA
- October 15, 1999 with Post Regiment at the Rozbrat Squat's fifth anniversary, Poznan, Poland.
- November 13, 1999 with Brother Inferior at MKNZ in Slovenia
- December 25, 1999 with Sin Dios at Na Vera, Madrid, Spain
- July 7, 2001 with Fallas Del Sistema at Las Biaz, Guadalajara, Mexico
- July 27–30, 2001 at the Collectivist Conference against Globalization in Hermosillo, Mexico
- September 1, 2001 with Creation is Crucifixion Oakland, CA AK Press Warehouse Space
- February 9, 2002 with Tragedy at Casa Sangre, Oakland, CA
- June 22, 2002 with High on Fire and Mastodon
- June 24, 2002 with Kakistocracy and Hiretsukan at clava haus in Asheville, NC
- June 26, 2002 with Uphill Battle at Uncle doctors, Columbia, SC

== Other projects ==
Currently DeCaprio and Nelson, who are the only members to play on all three albums, play in the band Embers in Oakland. Former drummer, Moses Saarni, went on to play with Drain the Sky featuring members of His Hero is Gone and Dystopia. Other notable bands including former members of Lesser Of Two are Ballast, Preying Hands, Jehovah's Hitlist, Myth of Progress, Look Back and Laugh and Pleasant Valley.

== Discography ==
- 1991: Swing 7" E.P. vinyl
- 1994: Journey Compilation on cassette tape
- 1994: Farmhouse '94 Compilation on C.D. and 12" vinyl(Farmhouse Records)
- 1995: Man...kind 7" E.P. vinyl
- 1999: self titled album on C.D, 12" vinyl, and cassette tape [Nict Nic Nie Wie (Poland), Malarie Records (Czech Republic), Estajanovismo Records (Mexico)]
- 2000: Magazine Pasazer No. 13-14 magazine with compilation C.D.
- 2000: Jedzenie zamiast polityki compilation cassette with proceeds supporting Food Not Bombs in Poland (Krzyk)
- 2001: Transmutation 7" E.P. vinyl
- 2002: Transmutation discography album on C.D. (singles, and outtakes)
- 2002: War Circus album on C.D.
