= Sta-Prest =

American queercore and riot grrrl band

Sta-Prest was a multi-racial queercore and riot grrrl band from San Francisco that was active in the 1990s. The group members included Aloofah (Iraya Robles) and D.M. Feelings (Gary Fembot).

== Musical career ==
The band first made its appearance on the queercore record label Outpunk Records in 1994, on its compilation Outpunk Dance Party. Soon afterwards they released their first EP, Vespa Sex, also on Outpunk, followed in 1996 by the 7-inch single "Let's Be Friendly With Our Friends/You Are The Company Spy". Like other bands influenced by the nascent riot grrrl scene in Olympia, Washington, New York no wave, and European post-punk, core members of Sta-Prest - Aloofah (Iraya Robles), Dudley Manlove a.k.a. D.M. Feelings (Gary Fembot), and Professor Swish (Mark Bishop) - adopted pseudonyms, swapped instruments between songs, and practiced a consensus-based approach to song composition. A revolving membership included Tetley, Twi Tybat, Clutch-y-Spun, and Scout. Their avant-pop sound and combination of male and female vocals were unique in the Queercore scene.

After Outpunk Records ceased to exist, the band recorded for the label Kill Rock Stars, releasing their final 7-inch single "Form Fitting/Diffy Peeps".

In 2002, Aloofah, (Iraya Robles) and Dudley Manlove, (Gary Fembot), appeared in Maximum Rocknroll's "Queer Punk" issue, featured in a discussion with the queer-identified musicians Martin Sorrondeguy of both Los Crudos and Limp Wrist and Aaron Detroit of The Little Deaths.

Spin-off bands from Sta-Prest include Feelings On A Grid, with Dudley Manlove a.k.a. D.M. Feelings (Gary Fembot) and Le Grid, a.k.a. Stanley Lamontagne, both heavily influenced by the sounds and aesthetics of the electropunk bands Suicide and The Screamers.

Professor Swish, now Mmothra, privately released a recording of ambient digital loopscapes after the style of Nurse with Wound and :zoviet*France, entitled Neurotic Styles. Gary Fembot played keyboards and sang with the band Puce Moment. The band's name was taken from Kenneth Anger's film Puce Moment.

Dudley Manlove (Gary Fembot) and Professor Swish (Mark Bishop) recorded as The Swishin' Duds, and are included on the soundtrack of the 2008 movie The Lollipop Generation by G.B. Jones, in which Gary Fembot appears in a cameo role.

== Films ==
In the mid-1990s, Robles co-wrote the script for Jill Reiter's film In Search of Margo-Go, which co-starred Reiter and Bikini Kill's Kathleen Hanna. The film was considered a lost riot grrrl film for many years, until it screened in 2014.

In 1997, Sta-Prest appeared in performance in the seminal documentary film She's Real, Worse Than Queer by Lucy Thane.

As well, they produced a video for one of their songs for the Kill Rock Stars video compilation, Kill Rock Stars Video Fanzine, which also included a short movie by member Gary Fembot, called The Oners.

== Discography ==
- "Nelly Strut/Suspiria" on Outpunk Dance Party, Outpunk Records OUT12CD, 1994
- Vespa Sex 7-inch EP on Outpunk Records OUT15, 1995
- "Let's Be Friendly With Our Friends/You Are The Company Spy" 7-inch single on Outpunk Records OUT19, 1996
- "Form Fitting/Diffy Peeps" on Kill Rock Stars Mailorder Freaks Singles Club 7-inch single, 1998
- Kill Rock Stars Video Fanzine No. 2
