= Alice Bag =

American singer (born 1958)

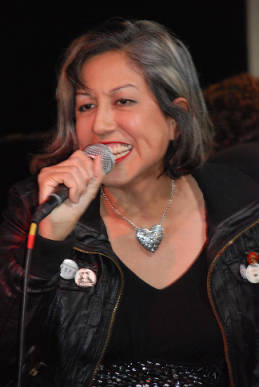
- Bag at the Women Who Rock 2012 Conference in Seattle, March 2012

Background information
- Born: Alicia Armendariz; November 7, 1958 (age 68); Los Angeles, California, U.S.
- Genres: Punk rock, Chicano punk
- Occupations: Singer, author, educator, feminist activist
- Formerly of: Bags
- Website: alicebag.com

Alicia "Alice" Armendariz (born November 7, 1958), also known as Alice Bag, is an American punk rock singer and author. She is the lead vocalist and co-founder of the Bags, one of the earliest punk bands to form in Los Angeles in the mid-1970s.

Bag has remained active in music since the late 1970s. She released her first book, Violence Girl: From East LA Rage to Hollywood Stage, in 2011; her second book was published in 2015. She released her debut solo album, Alice Bag, on Don Giovanni Records in June 2016. Her second solo album, Blueprint, was released in 2018, followed by Sister Dynamite in 2020.

In 2024, Bag's work was featured in Xican-a.o.x. Body, a comprehensive group exhibition on the experiences and contributions by Chicano artists from the 1960s to the present. The exhibition was presented at the Cheech Marin Center for Chicano Art & Culture of the Riverside Art Museum, California, and the Pérez Art Museum Miami, Florida.

== Early life and education ==
Bag was born and raised in East Los Angeles, California. Her father, Manuel Armendariz, was a self-employed carpenter who had participated in the Bracero program, and her mother, Candelaria "Candy" Armendariz, was a homemaker. Both of her parents were Mexican immigrants. Candy had five children from a previous marriage, which ended after the death of her first husband. Bag had an older half-sister, Yolanda.

Bag's musical influence originated from her family's diverse tastes, including her father's ranchera music and her sister's soul music collection.

During her adolescence, Bag experienced bullying related to her weight, teeth, and physical appearance. As a result, she often felt isolated, which further influenced her musical preferences toward artists such as Queen, David Bowie and Elton John. After transferring high schools, she was frequently called "Ziggy" after David Bowie's persona, Ziggy Stardust.

Bag earned a bachelor's degree in philosophy from California State University, Los Angeles, and subsequently worked as an English teacher in inner-city L.A. schools.

== Career ==
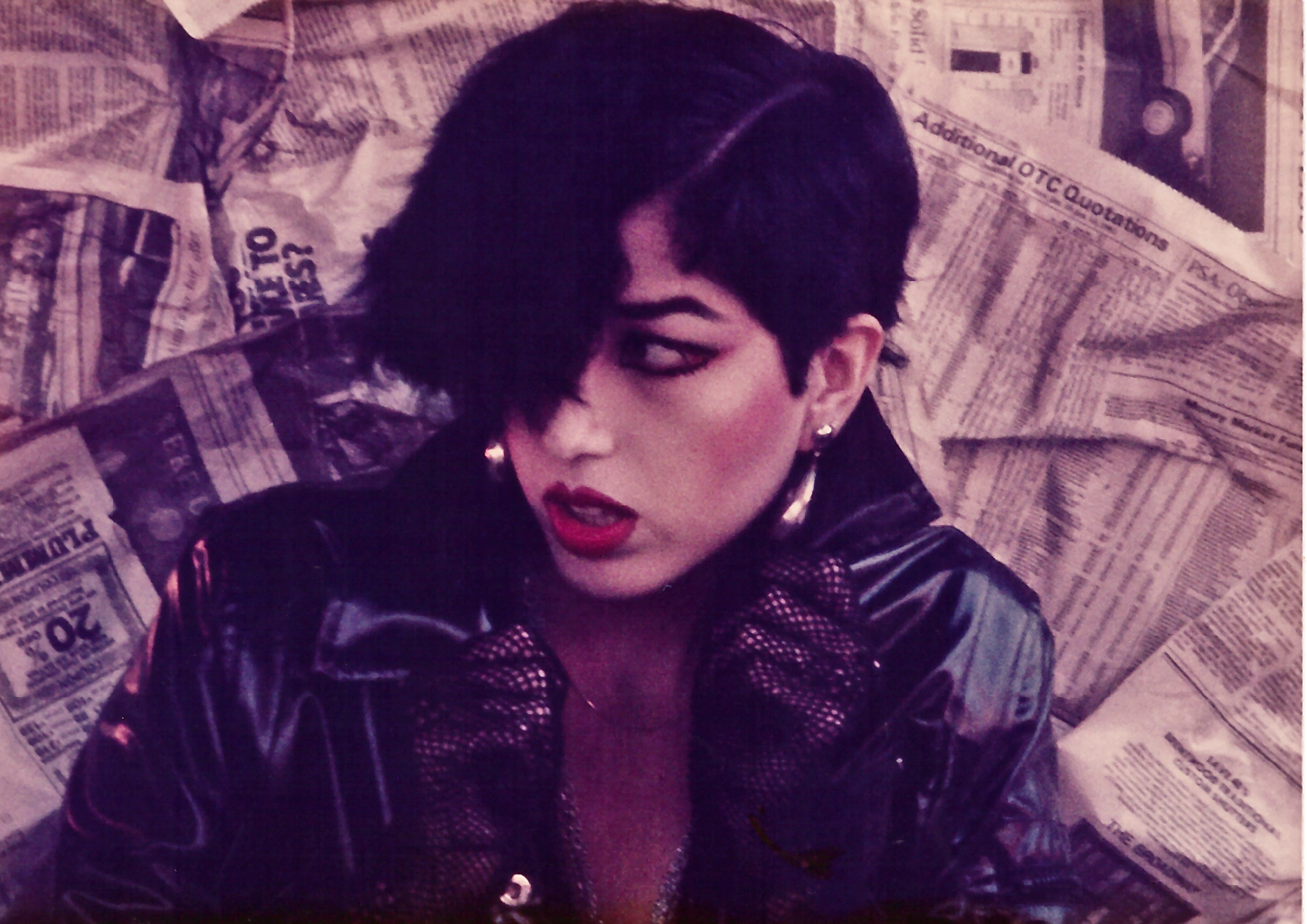
Bag in the 1980s

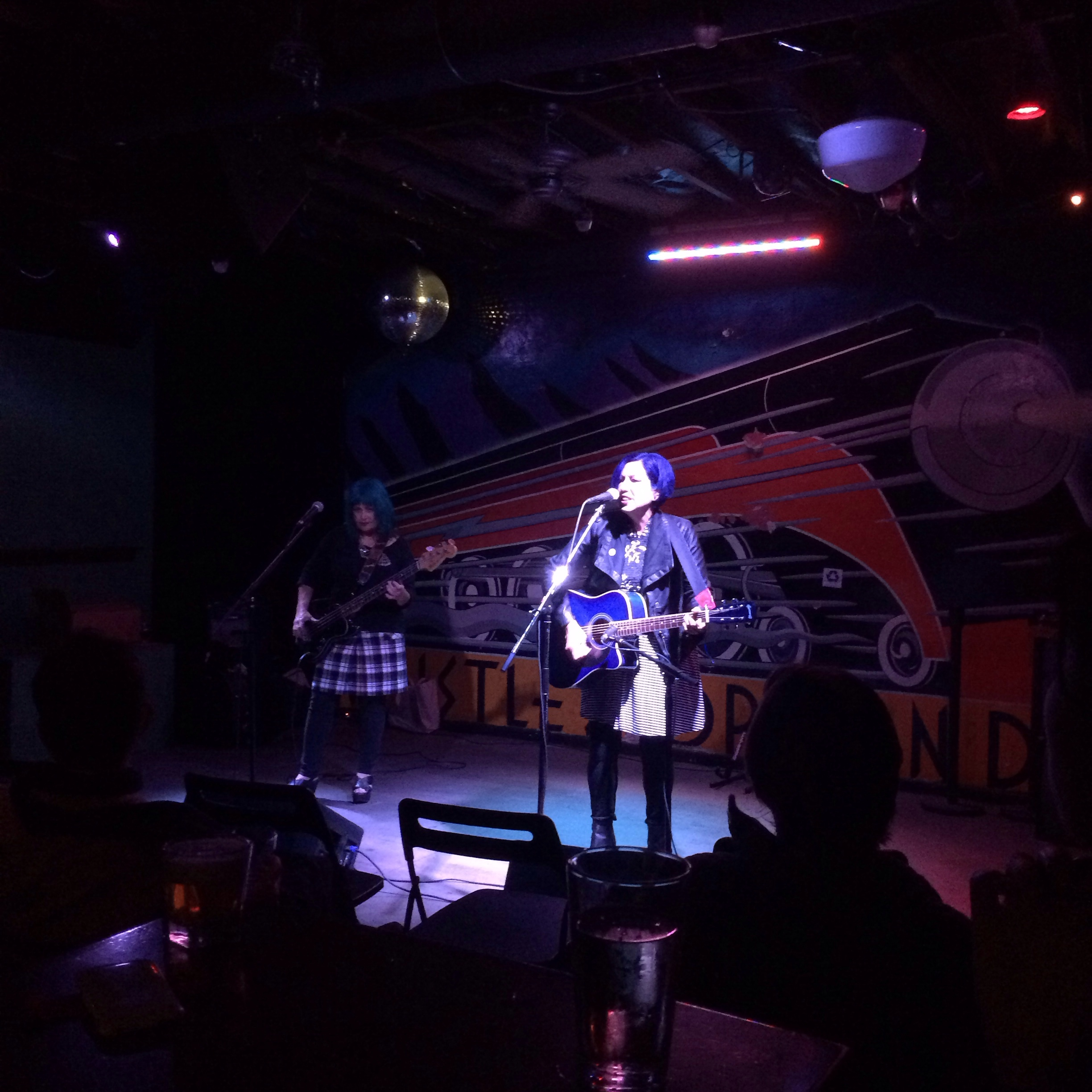
Bag spoken word 'Violence Girl', acoustic performance in San Diego, March 2014

Bag is best known for being a member of the Bags, one of the first bands on the L.A. punk scene. The Bags were notable for having two female lead musicians (the group was co-founded by Bag and school friend Patricia Morrison) and for pioneering an aggressive sound and style that has been cited as an early influence on what would become the hardcore punk sound. The band's aggressive sound was later noted to have a Mexican/Chicano influence, which Bag unintentionally incorporated from her childhood. Members of the Bags appeared as the Alice Bag Band in director Penelope Spheeris's landmark 1981 documentary on the Southern California punk scene, The Decline of Western Civilization. As a lead singer of the Bags, she pioneered the first wave of California punk alongside Black Flag, X, the Germs, Phranc (then in Catholic Discipline), and the five musicians who would go on to form the Go-Go's. Bag went on to appear and perform in other Los Angeles–based rock bands including Castration Squad, The Boneheads, Alarma, Cambridge Apostles, Swing Set, Cholita – the Female Menudo (with her friend and collaborator, performance artist Vaginal Davis), Las Tres, Goddess 13 (the subject of a KCET/PBS-produced documentary, Chicanas in Tune), and Stay at Home Bomb.

Later in Bag's career, she founded the "punk-chera" genre, fusing aspects of punk and ranchera performances.

=== Music ===
Alice Bag began singing professionally at the age of eight, recording theme songs for cartoons in both English and Spanish. She did not gain exposure until forming the Bags. Alice collaborated with Patricia Morrison and Margo Reyes in what they first called Mascara, then Femme Fatale, and then finally the Bags. The Bags were active from 1977 to 1981. They released a single "Survive" along with "Babylonian Gorgon".

The Bags songs included:

- Survive (single)
- Babylonian Gorgon (single)
- Gluttony
- TV Dinner
- Why Tomorrow?
- We Don't Need the English
- Animal Call
- Chainsaw
- We Will Bury You
- Violent Girl
- Disco's Dead
- Sanyo Theme

The Bags broke up by 1981, leading Alice Bag to join the band Cholita in the late 1980s. The Bags were renamed the Alice Bag Band for the release of The Decline of Western Civilization, after Alice Bag and partner Patricia Morrison had a dispute about who had the right to use the band name. Following the birth of her daughter in the mid-1990s, Alice Bag took a break from the music industry and become a stay-at-home mother. Soon after, she started her current project, Stay at Home Bomb. Stay at Home Bomb is an all-female community centered on punk rock that exists to address social constraints that are put on women domestically and musically. The band features Alice Bag as Mothra Stewart on vocals, guitar and washboard, Judy Cocuzza as Judy Polish on drums, pots and pans, Lysa Flores as Lady Licuadora on vocals, guitar and blenders and Sharon Needles on vocals and bass guitar.

In 2016, Alice Bag released her debut solo album, Alice Bag, on the punk label Don Giovanni Records. A second album, Blueprint, followed in early 2018, and featured numerous guest musicians including Allison Wolfe and Kathleen Hanna. Wolfe and Hanna were featured on the track "77", which refers to the unequal pay that women receive for the same work as men. Another song on Blueprint, "Se Cree Joven", features backing vocals from Teri Gender Bender and Francisca Valenzuela.

Another album, Sister Dynamite, was released by In the Red Records on April 24, 2020.

Bag has performed at events that celebrate women in punk rock, such as Women Who Rock in 2014.

She has also produced records such as Fatty Cakes and the Puff Pastries' 2018 self-titled release and Fea's 2019 record No Novelties.

=== Writing ===
Bag's memoir, Violence Girl, From East LA Rage to Hollywood Stage – A Chicana Punk Story, was published by Feral House in fall 2011. She was inspired to write Violence Girl after attending a comic-con with her daughter in 2008. Her memoir is a compilation of short stories exploring her journey to becoming a punk artist. The book includes accounts her entry into the punk rock scene during a period that was more welcoming to women musicians. It also examines how her experiences with domestic abuse fueled her desire for female empowerment and offers a perspective on the origins of hardcore, a genre that is often associated with white suburban males.

Bag's confrontational performance style was shaped by her experiences witnessing domestic abuse as a child. Bag channeled personal trauma into her stage presence, using punk music as a means of resisting victimization and oppression. Through music, Bag recognized how deeply she had internalized violence and sought to overcome it as a form of emotional release. Music became both a process of personal and a platform for empowering her community.

Since 2004, Bag has maintained a digital archive documenting the experiences of women involved in the first wave of the Southern California punk scene in the 1970s. The archive includes interviews with musicians, writers, and photographers, as well as newspaper and magazine clippings, photographs, and postcards related to the Los Angeles punk scene.

=== Activism ===
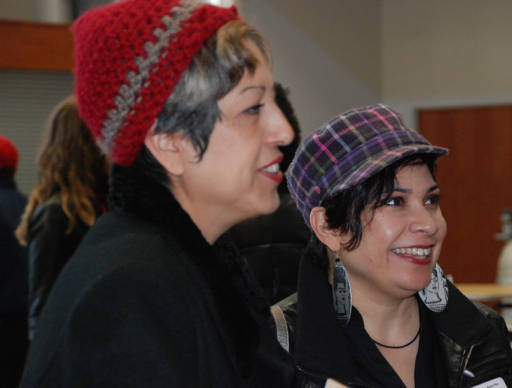
Bag and Michelle Habell-Pallan at the Women Who Rock 2011 conference at Seattle University Pigott Building, February 2011

Bag was the keynote speaker at the 2012 Women Who Rock: Making Scenes Building Communities (un)Conference in Seattle, Washington. The event's speakers and activities aimed to empower and inspire not only Latina women but women of every ethnicity. Alice Bag discussed her rough childhood and touched on points from her biography, Violence Girl. She sang alongside both The Januariez, a local band, and Medusa, a well-known emcee and hip-hop artist. Bag explained at the conference that the place for punk in the feminist movement is to continue to challenge; punk is meant to draw attention to things that are wrong in society: "We don't live in a post-racism, post-feminism, post anything; punk allows us to speak our minds." Bag's contributions to punk have been particularly impactful for women, people of color, and LGBTQ+ individuals. By embracing her identity as a queer brown feminist body in the music industry, she has projected herself into spaces that have traditionally ignored or excluded people like her.

She was also a part of the panel in the 2014 Women Who Rock (un)Conference.

== Personal life ==
Bag maintains part-time residence in Los Angeles, California, and Mexico City. She remains active in the music industry and has collaborated with artists such as Teresa Covarrubias, Lysa Flores, Martin Sorrondeguy, and Allison Wolfe. In recent years, she has also exhibited her oil painting in gallery shows.

Bag began filming and sharing workout videos on Instagram, YouTube, and Facebook during the COVID-19 pandemic.

Bag is bisexual.

== Discography ==
=== Solo albums ===
- Alice Bag (2016)
- Blueprint (2018)
- Sister Dynamite (2020)

=== Alice Bag and the Sissybears ===
- Alice Bag and the Sissybears (2017), pressing limited to 500

=== Bags ===
Singles

- Survive (1978)
- Disco's Dead (2003)

Collections

- All Bagged Up: The Collected Works 1977–1980 (2007)

== Works and publications ==
Books

- Bag, Alice (2011). Violence Girl: East L.A. Rage to Hollywood Stage: A Chicana Punk Story. Port Townsend, WA: Feral House. ISBN 978-1-936239-13-9. OCLC 756484532.
- Bag, Alice (2015). Pipe Bomb for the Soul. Los Angeles: CPSIA. ISBN 978-0-692-43319-5. OCLC 940969636.

Journals

- Bag, Alice (July 2012). "Work that Hoe: Tilling the Soil of Punk Feminism". Women & Performance: A Journal of Feminist Theory. 22 (2–3): 233–238. doi:10.1080/0740770X.2012.721079. ISSN 0740-770X. OCLC 6894716507. S2CID 154993883.
