= Rolin =

Surname

Rolin is a surname. Notable people with the surname include:

- Andrew Rolin (born 1987), American former college football player and coach
- Gustave Rolin-Jaequemyns (1835–1902), Belgian attorney at law, diplomat and Minister of the Interior
- Jean Rolin (writer) (born 1949), French writer and journalist
- Jean Rolin (cardinal) (1408–1483), Burgundian bishop and Cardinal
- Nicolas Rolin (1376–1462), leading figure in the history of Burgundy and France, becoming chancellor to Philip the Good
- Olivier Rolin (born 1947), French writer
- Rolin Jones (born 1972), playwright and television writer

== See also ==
- Madonna of Chancellor Rolin, oil painting by the Early Netherlandish master Jan van Eyck, dating from around 1435
- Musée Rolin, museum in Autun, Bourgogne, France
- Roll-in
- Rollin (disambiguation)
- Rolling
- Rowling (disambiguation)
