= Better Luck (album) =

Studio album by the Plugz
- Released: 1981
- Genre: Punk rock
- Label: Fatima
- Producer: The Plugz, Gustavo Santaolalla

The Plugz chronology
Electrify Me (1979)	Better Luck (1981)	Los Angelinos – The Eastside Renaissance (1983)

Better Luck is the second and final studio album by the American band the Plugz, released in 1981. It was released by the band's own Fatima Recordz. The first single was "Achin'".

== Production ==
The album was produced by the band and Gustavo Santaolalla, who also played guitar, bass, and charango. Bruce Fowler played trombone on the album; Steve Berlin contributed on saxophone. The band had recorded an album's worth of material after releasing their debut but decided it was too similar in sound. The cover art was created by Gary Panter. "Touch for Cash" is a narrative about the lives of prostitutes. "Cesar's Song" describes life as an Los Angeles gang member. "Gas Line" is about the 1979 oil crisis. "El Clavo y la Cruz" later appeared on the Repo Man soundtrack.

== Reception ==
Professional ratings
Review scores
Source	Rating
AllMusic	4.5/5 stars
LA Weekly	B+

The Los Angeles Times said, "Sounding like a transitional work, Better Luck is an uneven record, the clean studio sound depriving many songs of their potential intensity"; the paper later listed it as the 10th best Los Angeles album of the year. LA Weekly opined, "While lapses are evident—[Tito] Larriva's lyrics are at times uncomfortably close to the X school of poetic anguish—Better Luck is a remarkably vital, astute and listenable record." The paper, in a year-end holiday guide, noted that the album possessed "too much reserve, too little simplistic punk". The Argonaut called it "heartfelt but clear-eyed, guitar-driven and spare".

The Trouser Press Record Guide said, "The more mainstream Better Luck ups the Plugz' folk and country sides for a blend of Rank and File ... and Tom Petty, displaying a promising rock talent enervated to the point of tedium." In 2018, John Doe listed it as one of the "best punk rock albums ever", calling it an "unbelievable record... Best recorded record."

== Track listing ==
Side 1

1. "Better Luck"
2. "Red Eye #9"
3. "Achin'"
4. "American"
5. "In the Wait"
6. "El Clavo y la Cruz"

Side 2

1. "Blue Sofa"
2. "Touch for Cash"
3. "Gas Line"
4. "Cesar's Song"
5. "Shifting Heart"
6. "No Love"
