= Afro-Ukrainians =

Ukrainians of Sub-Saharan African descent

Afro-Ukrainians (Ukrainian: Афроукраїнці, romanized: Afroukraintsi) or Black Ukrainians are Ukrainians of Sub-Saharan African descent, including Black people who have settled in Ukraine.

== History ==
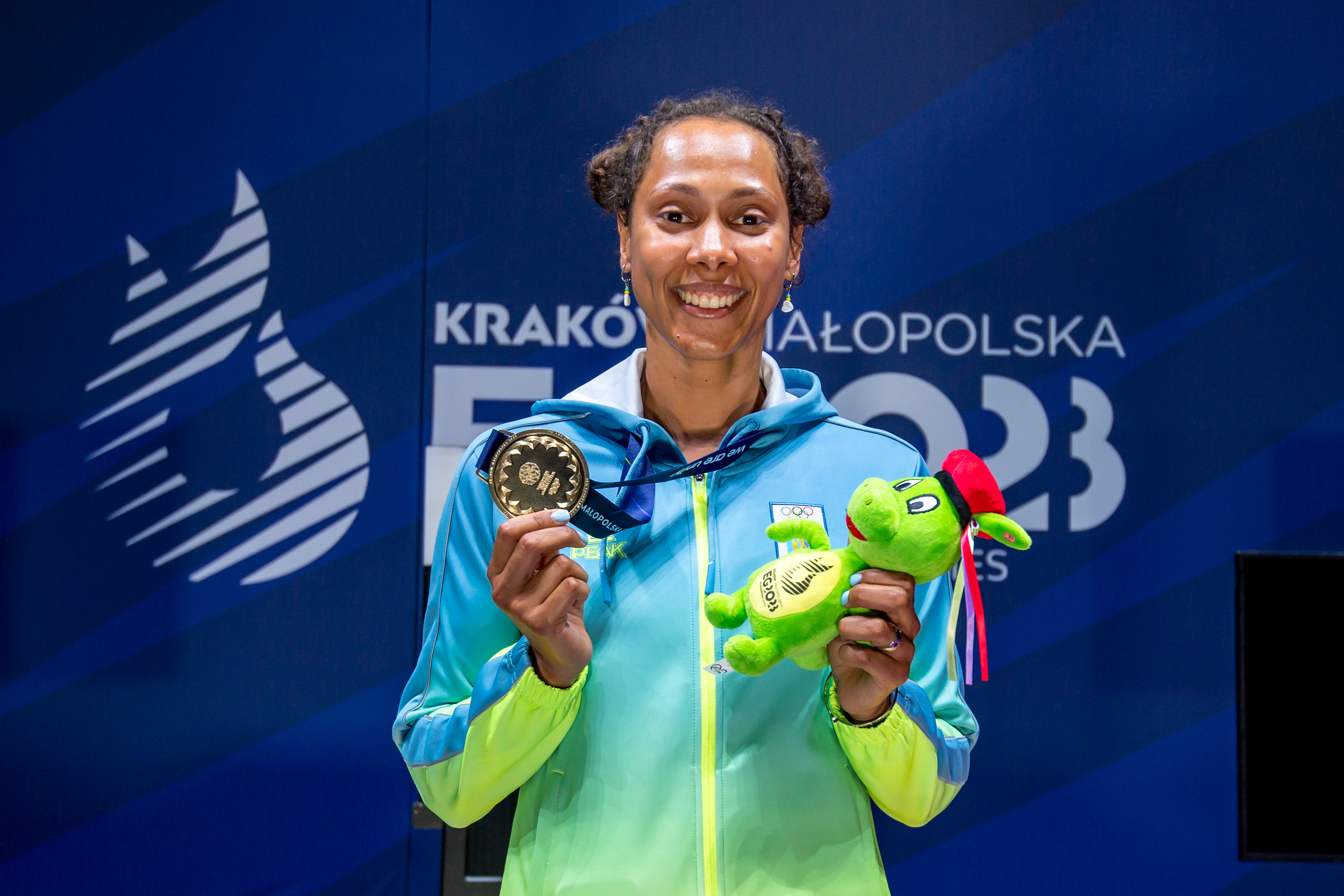
Ukrainian athlete Joan Fabi Bejura

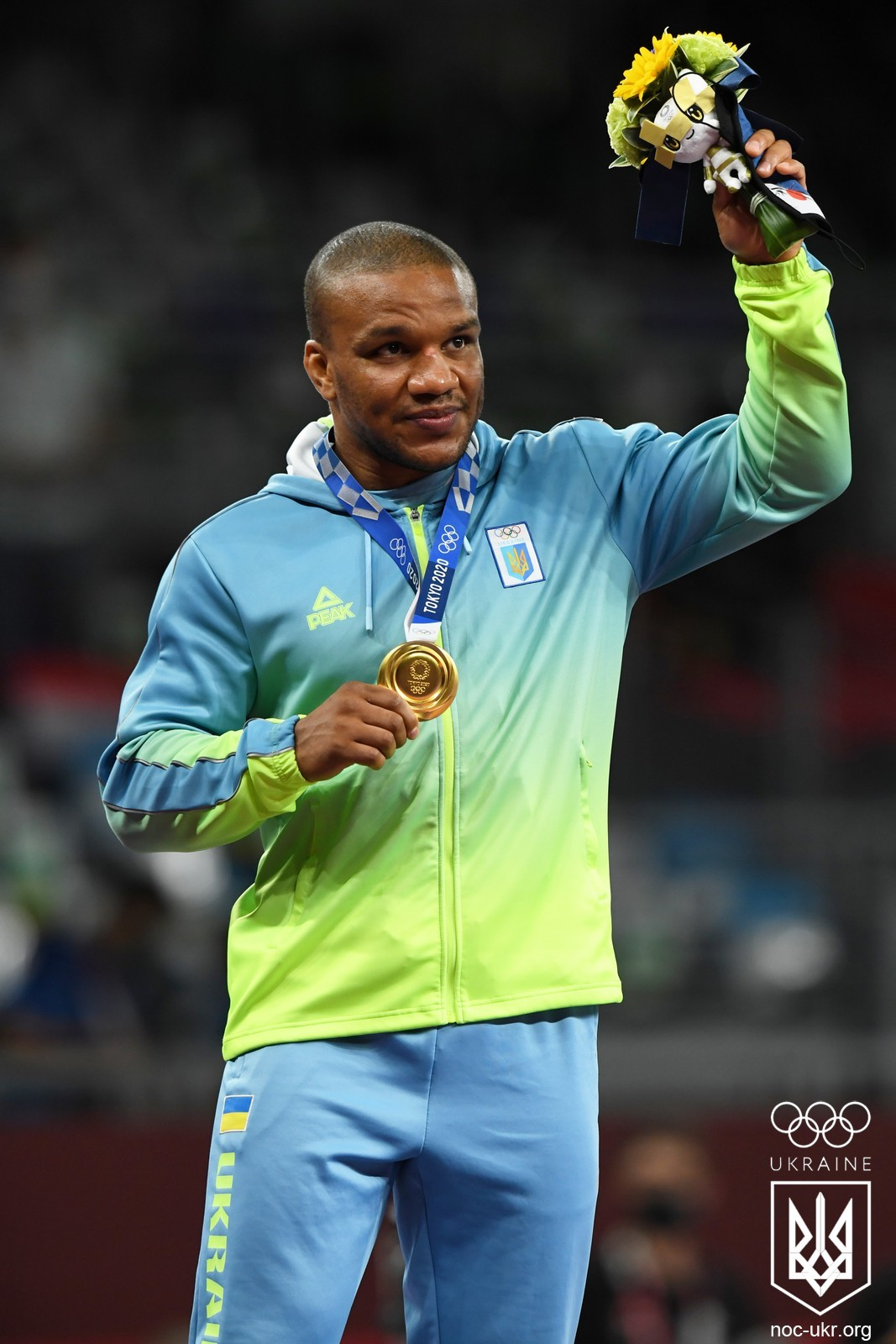
Zhan Beleniuk

In 2005, Mamadi Sangare became the first football player outside the post Soviet territory to accept the Ukrainian citizenship.

In 2012, Gaitana, by then "the only Afro-Ukrainian celebrity in her country", represented Ukraine at the Eurovision Song Contest.

In 2019, Zhan Beleniuk became the first Afro-Ukrainian member of the Ukrainian Parliament.

== Nehr ==
The Ukrainian word nehr (Ukrainian: негр) is widely used and is a nativized loan word from the French: nègre, lit. 'Negro', itself a nativized loan from the Spanish: negro and the Portuguese: negro. Although nègre is considered offensive in French, nehr/неɾр is not considered offensive. The native Slavic word for things that are actually black (e.g. a car with black paint) is chórnyy (Ukrainian: чо́рний).

== Population ==
The African Council estimates that 30,000 Africans live in Ukraine.

== Notable Afro-Ukrainians ==
- Aderinsola Habib Eseola, Nigerian-Ukrainian football player
- Aleks Chidomere, Nigerian-Ukrainian football player
- Antoniy Emere, Nigerian-Ukrainian football player
- Berta Vázquez, Ukrainian-born Spanish actress of Ethiopian-Ukrainian descent
- Colince Ngaha Poungoue, Cameroon-born football player and manager
- Daniel Ehbudzhuo, Nigerian-Ukrainian football player
- Denys Ndukve, Nigerian-Ukrainian football player
- Dzhoan Feybi Bezhura, Ugandan-Ukrainian fencer
- Gaitana, Congolese-Ukrainian singer
- Ismail Sillakh, Sierra Leonean-Ukrainian boxer
- Issuf Sanon, Burkinabé-Ukrainian basketball player
- Joel Bolomboy, Ukrainian-born Congolese-Russian basketball player
- Mamadi Sangare, Guinean-Ukrainian football player
- Mark Mampassi, Congolese-Ukrainian football player
- Mirabella Akhunu, Ukrainian artistic gymnast
- Myroslav Kuvaldin, Nigerian-Ukrainian reggae singer, songwriter and television presenter
- Olavale Fabunmi, Nigerian-Ukrainian football player
- Philippe Hamilton-Rollings, Ghanaian-Ukrainian football player
- Quedjau Nhabali, Bissau-Guinean-Ukrainian judoka
- Roland Bilala, Congolese-Ukrainian football player
- Şeref Osmanoğlu, Ukrainian-born Turkish athlete of Sudanese-Ukrainian descent
- Vladis-Emmerson Illoy-Ayyet, Congolese-Ukrainian football player
- Zhan Beleniuk, Rwandan-Ukrainian wrestler and politician

== See also ==
- Racism in Ukraine
