= Cojoba (band) =

Puerto Rican hardcore/punk band

In 2004 Cojoba had its first tour to the U.S., playing in New York and Boston, where they were invited to play at La Rivolta, an anarcha-feminist festival. The following year, they were invited to La Rivolta again, and took the opportunity to play in New York, as well as in Baltimore.

In 2006, the band started recording its next CD, Más allá del cielo, and its songs for a split CD, in collaboration with Spanish band Angela Chaning. In October of the following year, Taína and Javier moved to New York City and finished recording both albums there, in their apartment. In June 2007, Juanpi and David join Taína and Javier in New York. They went on tour again, playing in New York, Boston, and at the CLITfest in Richmond, Virginia.

== New York ==
Cojoba, now being based in Harlem, New York, added Moe to the bass and Cristian to the drums. In October 2006, they went to Chicago, Illinois to play the Latino Punk Festival. But days after the tour, Cristian had to move to Canada. Unable to find a local drummer, but eager to start playing again, the band found a drummer from Texas, Stefan, who also plays with jazz band Yells and Eels, and thrashers Akkolyte, Just Another Consumer and other bands, offered to fly to New York to play a few shows in Chicago's CLITfest, and to tour in November 2008 to the cities of Bogotá, Medellín, and Manizales, Colombia.

The band's current drummer is Ray, who was once a member of New York-based thrash-metal band M-16.

Cojoba is a hardcore, punk band from Puerto Rico.

== Early years ==
Cojoba was formed in August 1995, in Carolina, Puerto Rico. The original line-up included Taína as vocalist and Gilbert as the guitarist. At the time, the band didn't have a drummer.

Cojoba released its first self-produced demo cassette, Espíritu de Punk, in 1996. Javier did the recording and mixing, Taína did the artwork, and Gilbert distributed to record stores in Puerto Rico. The band also set up a small distribution outfit, Anaconda Records, where they sold not only Cojoba's music, and distributed other bands' material.

Later on, Gilbert left the band, and Taína and Javier produced their next demo cassette, Vienen por Nosotros. This cassette was released in 1999, and had more politically oriented lyrics.

== During the 2000s ==
In 2001, Cojoba released its first CD, Jugando con Fuego. This set introduced a drummer, and Sham Pain alumnus Bebe, to the band. Rolin, Javier's youngest brother, also joined the band as bassist, while Javier switched to guitar. Bebe and Rolin gave Cojoba a more thrash metal sound, which was very different from the punk rock sound the band expressed in its two first records. However, Taína's voice, although a lot stronger, remained melodic.

Before this CD was released, Cojoba had the chance to go on an international tour for the first time. With the help of Venezuelan anarchopunk band Apatía No, they played three shows in Caracas, Venezuela. Shortly after that, Bebe left the band. David, who had years' of experience drumming for Tavú and other Puerto Rican bands replaced him, while Rolin stayed on. In 2002, the band went on tour to Spain, France and Belgium, playing 12 shows. It also released an EP, El arte de la irreverencia, under the Paris-based indie label New Wave Records.

When they got back from that tour, the line up changed again, and Juanpi replaced Rolin on bass. In 2003, the band released another CD, Sin Excusas, and went on another tour, this time playing entirely within Spain.

In 2004 Cojoba had its first tour to the U.S., playing in New York and Boston, where they were invited to play at La Rivolta, an anarcha-feminist festival. The following year, they were invited to La Rivolta again, and took the opportunity to play in New York, as well as in Baltimore.

In 2006, the band started recording its next CD, Más allá del cielo, and its songs for a split CD, in collaboration with Spanish band Angela Chaning. In October of the following year, Taína and Javier moved to New York City and finished recording both albums there, in their apartment. In June 2007, Juanpi and David join Taína and Javier in New York. They went on tour again, playing in New York, Boston, and at the CLITfest in Richmond, Virginia.

== New York ==
Cojoba, now being based in Harlem, New York, added Moe to the bass and Cristian to the drums. In October 2006, they went to Chicago, Illinois to play the Latino Punk Festival. But days after the tour, Cristian had to move to Canada. Unable to find a local drummer, but eager to start playing again, the band found a drummer from Texas, Stefan, who also plays with jazz band Yells and Eels, and thrashers Akkolyte, Just Another Consumer and other bands, offered to fly to New York to play a few shows in Chicago's CLITfest, and to tour in November 2008 to the cities of Bogotá, Medellín, and Manizales, Colombia.

The band's current drummer is Ray, who was once a member of New York-based thrash-metal band M-16.

== Discography ==
- "Espíritu de Punk: cassette. 1996. Anaconda Records.
- Destruye el sexismo: Cassette recopilatorio de bandas con mujeres. 1997. Civilización Violenta, Argentina. Canción: Hueliendo Pega.
- Cry Now, Cry Later Vol. 2: CD recopilatorio. 1997. Pessimiser Records, California. Canción: Hueliendo Pega.
- Zinevergüenza 7.5: Cassette recopilatorio con bandas de P.R. 1997. Anaconda Records.Canciones: Al garete, La caída.
- Underground Invasion Vol. 1: CD recopilatorio. 1998. Beer City Records, Wisconsin. Canción: Vienen por Nosotros.
- New Days Rising: CD recopilatorio.

1998. Y. Boislève, Francia. Canciones: Destino Manifiesto, La Caída, Gente Olvidada, Al Garete.

- Vienen por Nosotros: Cassette. 1998. Anaconda Records.
- Allan McNaughton Project: Disco recopilatorio 7-inch. 1999. Beer City Records, Wisconsin. Canción: Políticos Presos.
- Escondidos en la Sociedad: Cassette recopilatorio con bandas de P.R. 1999. Wagui Records, Cidra, Puerto Rico. Canción: Los Plebeyos.
- Chaos Core II: CD recopilatorio. 2000. 3C.R.C. Records, Francia. Canción: Y así será.
- Simulacro: Cassette. 2000. Anaconda Records.
- Jugando con Fuego: CD. 2001. Anaconda Records.
- Sin Fronteras Ni Banderas: CD recopilatorio. 2001. Chivolo Diskos, Ecuador.
- Against Sexism & Racism: Cassette recopilatorio internacional. 2001. AMAN Recs., Malaysia.
- Rompe la Incomunicación: CD recopilatorio de bandas cantando en castellano. 2002. Mala Raza y Radio Topo, España.
- El Arte de la Irreverencia: 7-inch EP. 2002. New Wave Records, Francia.
- Solidaridad con Voz y Ruido: CD recopilatorio internacional de grupos con mujeres. 2002. Anar-rca, Puerto Rico.
- Uniendo Fronteras: CD recopilatorio internacional. 2002. Beneficio Interno, Costa Rica.
- Already too much blood on science hands: CD recopilatorio en beneficio a los derechos animales. 2002. Counteract Recs., Francia.
- Espíritu de Punk/Vienen por Nosotros: CD. 2002. Boileve Records, Francia.
- Sin Excusas: CD. 2003. Anaconda Records.
- Toksiko 'zine: CD recopilatorio con grupos españoles en su mayoría. 2003. Toksiko, Espana.
- Punk Occupation No. 3: CD recopilatorio internacional. 2003. Rusia.
- Su lucha, la nuestra: Cass. recopilatorio de grupos internacionales. 2003. Pozoin Banaketak, Euskadi.
- Cojoba & M.I.G.R.A.: Cass. compartido con un grupo de Venezuela. 2003. Chilas Distro, Venezuela.
- Sonidos para reactivar la revolución: CD recopilatorio de grupos punk latinoamericanos. 2004. Persistencia Recs., Colombia.
- Nuestras voces son sus pesadillas: CD recopilatorio a beneficio de Radio Bronka. 2004. Barcelona, Catalunya.
- Short, Fast and Loud: CD recopilatorio con bandas que integran mujeres. 2004. Short, Fast and Loud 'zine, California.
- Musika...beste borroka modu bat da: VHS con grupos que han tocado en gastetxes y centros sociales de Euskal Herria. 2004(?).Zirikatu, Euskal Herria.
- 512 anos despues, el saqueo continua: CD recopilatorio a beneficio de los indigenas Pemones de Venezuela, 2005. Noseke Recs., Alemania.
- Más allá del cielo; CD. 2007, Anaconda Records.
- Maldito cielo rojo, (Cojoba/ Angela Chaning) CD. 2007, Mala Raza, Zaragoza.
- "Crisis Por Siempre" CD 2010
- "Cojoba/Clusterfuck", 7-inch split, 2014

== See also ==
- Latino punk
