= Blueprint (Alice Bag album) =

Studio album by Alice Bag
- Released: March 23, 2018
- Studios: Station House Studio, Echo Park, Los Angeles, California, United States
- Genres: Punk rock, political music
- Length: 39:27
- Languages: English, Spanish
- Label: Don Giovanni
- Producers: Alice Bag; Lysa Flores

Alice Bag chronology
Alice Bag (2016)	Blueprint (2018)	Sister Dynamite (2020)

Blueprint is a studio album by American punk rock vocalist Alice Bag, released on March 23, 2018. The album has received positive reviews.

== Reception ==
Nina Corcoran of Pitchfork Media scored this album a 7.4 out of 10, for the artist having resilience and presenting "accessible, open-ended, and inclusive music" decades into her career. In NPR's First Listen, Paula Mejía also connected this release with Bags' lifetime of musicianship and activism, noting how there is "still so much work to do"; the publisher also gave a positive review to "77", with Stephanie Fernández writing in Songs We Love comparing it favorably to other feminist anthem "9 to 5". The editorial staff of AllMusic Guide listed this as among the Best of 2018, scoring it a four out of five stars, with reviewer Mark Deming writing, "Alice Bag is one of the most exciting and compelling new artists currently making music. Loren DiBiasi of Paste scored Blueprint a 7.7 out of 10, noting that "few singers can scream like Alice Bag" and that the music has "unstoppable energy". The Los Angeles Times' Randall Roberts noted the political nature of Bags' music and how she has not diminished in her ferocity as a musician or social critic. Similarly, Nate Jackson of OC Weekly characterizes this music as "activism with attitude", in addition to the attempts that Bag has made to build community with her live performances and writing.

== Track listing ==
All songs written by Alice Bag

1. "Turn It Up" – 3:04
2. "Invisible" – 4:57
3. "77" – 2:59
4. "Stranger" – 3:17
5. "Shame Game" – 3:50
6. "Etched Deep" – 3:22
7. "Blueprint" – 2:15
8. "The Sparkling Path" – 3:07
9. "Se Cree Joven" (English: "He Thinks He Is Young") – 3:46
10. "Adrift" – 4:59
11. "White Justice" – 4:01

== Personnel ==
- Alice Bag – vocals; production; piano on "Turn It Up", "Stranger", "Blueprint", and "Adrift"; acoustic guitar on "Adrift"
- Jocelyn Areliuga – trumpet on "Stranger", "Blueprint"
- Genevieve Atkerson – backing vocals on all tracks except "Sparking Path"
- Joe Berardi – drums on "Invisible", "Shame Game", "Etched Deep", "Se Cree Joven"
- Sharif Dumani – guitar
- Lysa Flores – mixing; production; backing vocals on "Turn It Up", "77", "Stranger", "Etched Deep", "Blueprint", "Sparkling Path", "Se Cree Joven", and "White Justice"; snapping on "Shame Game"; guitar on "77"
- Vivi Flores – backing vocals on "Turn It Up", snapping on "Shame Game"
- Rudy Garcia – backing vocals on "Turn It Up", "Etched Deep", "Blueprint", and "White Justice"
- Eva Gardner – bass guitar on "Invisible", "Shame Game", "Etched Deep", "Se Cree Joven"
- Teri Gender Bender – lead vocals on "Se Cree Joven", backing vocals on "77"
- Chalo González – mastering at CHT Estudios
- Kathleen Hanna – lead vocals on "77", backing vocals on "Turn It Up", "Blueprint"
- Candace Hansen – drums on "77", "Sparkling Path", "Adrift", and "White Justice"
- Kristian Hoffman – keyboards on "Adrift" and "White Justice"
- David O. Jones – bass guitar on "Turn It Up", "77", "Stranger", "Blueprint", "Sparkling Path", "Adrift", and "White Justice"
- Dan McGough – keyboards on "Invisible", "Shame Game", "Etched Deep", "Se Cree Joven"
- Aniela Perry – cello on "Invisible", "Etched Deep", "Adrift"
- Liam Philpot – saxophone on "Stranger", "Blueprint"
- Mark Rains – recording, mixing, engineering, floor tom on "Sparkling Path"
- Rosalie Rodriguez – violin on "Invisible", "Etched Deep", "Adrift"
- Shizu Saldamando – cover illustration
- Martin Sorrondeguy – backing vocals on "Turn It Up", "Etched Deep", "Blueprint", and "White Justice"
- Joe Steinhardt – layout
- Francisca Valenzuela – lead vocals on "Se Cree Joven", backing vocals on "77"
- Chelsea Velasquez – backing vocals on all tracks except "Sparkling Path"
- Greg Velasquez – design, back cover photo
- Rikki Watson – drums on "Turn It Up", "Stranger", "Blueprint"
- Allison Wolfe – lead vocals on "77", backing vocals on "Turn It Up", "Blueprint", and "White Justice"
