= Alice Bag (album) =

Studio album by Alice Bag
- Released: June 24, 2016
- Genre: Punk, rock
- Length: 37:46
- Label: Don Giovanni Records

Alice Bag chronology
Alice Bag (2016)	Blueprints (2018)

Professional ratings
Review scores
Source	Rating
AllMusic	4/5 stars
Magnet	Essential New Music
Pitchfork	7.5/10

Alice Bag is the debut solo album by Alice Bag, released on Don Giovanni Records in 2016. The cover art was created by Martin Sorrondeguy.

== Track listing ==
No.	Title	Length
1.	"Little Hypocrite"	3:08
2.	"He's So Sorry"	4:20
3.	"Programmed"	2:18
4.	"Suburban Home"	4:56
5.	"The Touch I Crave"	2:50
6.	"Poisoned Seed"	3:16
7.	"No Means No"	2:38
8.	"Weigh About You"	2:00
9.	"Modern Day Virgin Sacrifice"	2:45
10.	"Incorporeal Life"	4:00
11.	"Inesperado Adios"	5:35
Total length:		37:46
