= Area 12 =

Area 12 can refer to:

- Brodmann area 12
- Area 12 (Nevada National Security Site)
- Area 12 (band)
