= Rowling =

Rowling may refer to:

== People ==
- Bill Rowling (1927–1995), former Prime Minister of New Zealand
- Ian Rowling (born 1967), Australian sprint canoeist
- J. K. Rowling (born 1965), British author of the Harry Potter series
- Reese Rowling (1928–2001), American businessman and geologist
- Robert Rowling (born 1953), American businessman

== Other uses ==
- 43844 Rowling, an asteroid named in honor of J.K. Rowling

== See also ==
- Rowlings
- Rolling (disambiguation)
- Rollin (disambiguation)
- Rollings
- Tobi Adebayo-Rowling (born 1996), English football player
- Citizens for Rowling, a campaign named after Bill Rowling
