= Look Back and Laugh =

American hardcore punk band

- Origin: Oakland, California, U.S.
- Genres: Hardcore punk, thrashcore
- Years active: 2004–2007
- Labels: Ebullition, Lengua Armada Discos, Maximumrocknroll, Deranged Records
- Past members: Casey Watson; Brian Stern; Tobia Minckler; Mark Wilcox; Moses Saarni
- Website: lookbackandlaugh.net

Look Back and Laugh was an American, San Francisco Bay Area-based, 1980s style hardcore punk band, featuring members from many notable Bay Area bands, named after a song title by Minor Threat.

== History ==
Look Back and Laugh was formed by former members of the bands Yaphett Kotto, Dead and Gone, Destroy, Talk Is Poison, and Lesser of Two. The band was formed as a hobby by its members who wanted to focus on other priorities in their life while still having a musical outlet. Despite this the band released three full-length albums in its three-year existence on two prominent independent labels Ebullition and Lengua Armada Discos.

== Musical style ==
Look Back and Laugh plays a mixture of 1980s-style hardcore punk and Southern California thrashcore. The music style was chosen to reflect some of the members' early musical influences. The name, Look Back and Laugh, was chosen to represent this choice because of its literal meaning, as well as the fact that it is the title of a song by Minor Threat, an 1980s hardcore punk band.

== Discography ==
- 2003: Look Back and Laugh – 12"/CD Lengua Armada Discos
- 2004: Look Back and Laugh/Dropdead Split – 7" Armageddon Label
- 2005: Look Back and Laugh – 12"/CD Lengua Armada Discos
- 2006: Street Terrorism – 7" Deranged Records
- 2007: State of Illusion – 7"/Shaped 12"/CD Lengua Armada Discos
