= Rowlings =

Rowlings is a surname of English and Irish origin. Notable people with the surname are:

- Barry Rowlings (born 1950), Australian footballer
- Ben Rowlings (born 1996), British paralympic athlete
- Stephen Rowlings (born 1976), English snooker player

== See also ==
- Rollings
- Rowling (disambiguation)
