= Rolling (disambiguation) =

Rolling is a type of motion that combines rotation and translation.

Rolling may also refer to:

== Arts, entertainment and media ==
- Rolling (film), a 2007 drama
- Rolling (video game), an inline skating video game
- "Rolling", a song by Soul Coughing from the 1998 album El Oso

== Places ==
- Rolling, Bous, Luxembourg
- Rolling, Wisconsin, U.S.
- Rolling Bay, Bainbridge Island, Washington, U.S.

== People ==
- Rolling Ray (1966–2025), American influencer
- Fatai Rolling Dollar (1927–2013), Nigerian singer-songwriter
- Carl Rolling (1893–1954), American baseball player
- Danny Rolling (1954–2006), American serial killer and rapist
- Franck Rolling (born 1968), French footballer
- Henry Rolling (born 1965), American football player
- Ray Rolling (1886–1966), American baseball player

== Other uses ==
- Rolling (finance), trading contracts to maintain a given maturity
- Rolling (metalworking), a fabricating process
- Rolling (physiology), an aspect of leukocyte extravasation
- Rolling (television), a problem with analog TV sets
- Rolling, or sparring, in Brazilian jiu-jitsu
- Rolling, decorating trees and houses with paper, also called toilet papering

== See also ==
- Roll (disambiguation)
- Roller (disambiguation)
- Rollin (disambiguation)
- Rowling (disambiguation)
