= Sister Dynamite =

Studio album by Alice Bag
- Released: April 24, 2020
- Genre: Punk, rock
- Label: In the Red Records
- Producer: Lysa Flores; Alice Bag

Alice Bag chronology
Blueprint (2018)	Sister Dynamite (2020)

Professional ratings
Review scores
Source	Rating
AllMusic	4/5 stars
Punknews.org	3.5/5 stars

Sister Dynamite is the third solo album by Alice Bag. The album was released on In the Red.

The single "Spark" was released in early April. Bag described the song as "about owning the differences that other people might see as odd or queer and celebrating them because they are what makes you unique. It’s a song about self-acceptance and self-love."

== Track listing ==
- "Spark"
- "Gate Crasher"
- "Switch Hitter"
- "Identified"
- "Sender Is Blocked"
- "Breadcrumbs"
- "Súbele"
- "Noise"
- "Sister Dynamite"
- "Lucky"
- "Even"
- "Risk It"

== Personnel ==
- Alice Bag – vocals
- David Jones – bass
- Sharif Dumani – guitar
- Candace Hansen – drums

== Reception ==
Punknews.org praised the album saying the songs had "an expertly crafted mix of '70's rock and punk rock backbone." AllMusic called the album Bag's "third out-of-the-park home run in a row." Atwood Magazine said the album was "a life affirming, head banging experience."
