= Embers (band) =

Metal band from Oakland, USA

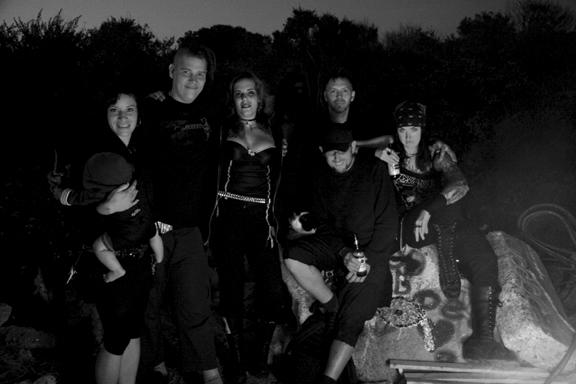
- Embers

Background information
- Origin: Oakland, California, United States
- Genres: Black Metal; Doom Metal; Crust Punk
- Years active: 2004–present
- Spinoff of: Lesser of Two
- Members: Steven DeCaprio; Kelly Nelson; Jerry Buchanan; Timm Kennedy
- Past members: Nine Katechis; Lillian Phaeton
- Website: http://embers-music.com/

Embers is an American dark ambient heavy metal band, with male and female vocals and a black metal influence from Oakland, California, United States.

== History ==
Embers was formed in 2004 by Kelly Nelson on bass and vocals, Steven DeCaprio on guitar, and Jerry Buchanan on drums.

Kelly and Steve are the former members of the political hardcore/metal band, Lesser of Two, formed in 1990 and dissolved in 2002. Lesser of Two released three CDs, and two singles.

Jerry Buchanan has played in a number of Bay Area bands over the last 15 years including Fields of Shit and Abandon featuring members from the seminal "East Bay hardcore" band Filth. He also plays drums in a tribute band called I Yearn for Maiden.

Nine plays viola with over 15 years of experience and has performed with various artist including current Bay Area bands Rivers Run Black and Six Billion Dead. She now has only an occasional performance based relationship with Embers.

Lillian a classically trained pianist has not played keys in a band prior to Embers. She has been part of the SF punk scene for many years.

Timm has played guitar in Neoni Eagal, Background to Malfunction, and a number of other music projects over the years and is a vocalist for Embers.

Embers has been noted as one of a number of prominent San Francisco Bay Area metal acts to feature women. The fact that three members of the band are female is notable due to the historic lack of female representation in heavy metal.

== Ideology ==
Embers has been referred to as a Red and Anarchist Black Metal group. This is partially because Kelly Nelson and Steven DeCaprio's previous band Lesser of Two was an anarchist punk rock band noted for their independent D.I.Y. ethic. This is also partially due to the radical lifestyle of the band members.

Guitarist, Steven DeCaprio is a squatter and housing rights activist featured in the movie Shelter: a squatumentary.

Drummer, Jerry Buchanan's project, I Yearn for Maiden has played numerous events and political actions in support of radical community projects including, in part, squatter's rights as well as defending People's Park by performing while activists resisted police while rebuilding a "free box".

Keyboardist, Lillian Phaeton is a former member of the board of directors of the California League of Conservation Voters a major environmental organization.

== Musical style ==
Embers blends punk and black metal, but also have a unique melancholic sound similar to other Bay Area peers such as Ludicra and Saros.

Embers has received positive reviews for their music including Heathen Harvest webzine, Profane Existence magazine, and Decibel Magazine.

== Current members ==
- Steven DeCaprio - guitar
- Kelly Nelson - bass guitar and vocals
- Jerry Buchanan - drums
- Timm Kennedy - guitar and vocals

== Past members ==
- Nine Katechis - viola
- Lillian Phaeton - keyboards

== Discography ==
- 2007: Memoria In Aeterna
- 2009: Wrath (split album with Book of Belial)
- 2011: Shadows
