= Yaphet Kotto (band) =

American hardcore punk band

- Origin: Santa Cruz, California, United States
- Genres: Hardcore punk, punk rock, emo, screamo
- Years active: 1996–2005
- Labels: Ebullition, Analog Kid, Sonzai, Council, Scene Police
- Past members: Austin Barber; Casey Watson; Chris Story; Jose Palafox; Keith Miller; Luke Clements; Mag Delana; Pat Crowley; Paul Cameron; Scott Batiste

Yaphet Kotto was an American hardcore punk band from Santa Cruz, California active between 1996 and 2005. Named after the actor, Yaphet Kotto formed after the demise of another band called Staple, of which Casey Watson and Mag Delana were members. Lyrically, the group dealt with social and political issues. They were also known for their chaotic and cathartic compositions which blended dueling vocals, melody and extremity. The group released three full-length albums on Ebullition Records, and made several singles, extended plays, and appearances on split-albums and compilations.

== History ==
Yaphet Kotto was formed in Santa Cruz, California in 1996 by former members of a band called Staple, guitarist/vocalist Casey Watson and guitarist/vocalist Mag Delana. Bassist Pat Crowley, a childhood friend of Watson, joined shortly before drummer Scott Batiste. The band got their name from American actor Yaphet Kotto, with whom Delana was "fascinated with." An insert in their first release The Killer Was in the Government Blankets stated "Yaphet Kotto is part of no scene. Enjoy music for what it is/Not who it is." The band's lyrics dealt with various social and political issues such as the genocide of the Native Americans ("The Killer Was In The Government Blankets"), revolutionary inaction ("B and C"), the war on terror ("Circumstantial Evidence"), American democracy ("Fact Nor Fiction"), and the legacy of segregation in America ("Reserved for Speaker"). Since the dissolution of Yaphet Kotto, former members have joined bands such as Saviours, Look Back and Laugh, Baader Brains, The Third Victim of Abigail Rutledge, Never Healed, The Old Firm Casuals and Middle-Aged Queers.

== Discography ==
=== Studio albums ===
- The Killer Was in the Government Blankets LP (1999, Ebullition)
- Syncopated Synthetic Laments for Love (2001, Ebullition)
- Yaphet Kotto/This Machine Kills/Envy (2002, Sonzai) - split album with This Machine Kills and Envy
- We Bury Our Dead Alive (2004, Ebullition)

=== Compilations ===
- Unreleased (2008, self-released)

=== Singles/EPs ===
- The Killer Was in the Government Blankets (1998, Analog Kid Records)
- "Critical Response"/"Collapse & Die" (2000, Council) - split 7" single with Suicide Nation
- Yaphet Kotto (2002, Council)
- European Tour 12" (2003, Scene Police)

== Members ==
=== Final lineup ===
- Mag Delana
- Casey Watson
- Austin Barber
- Scott Batiste

=== Past members ===
- Steve Roche
- Chris Story
- Paul Cameron
- Pat Crowley
- Keith Miller
- Jose Palafox
- Luke Clements
