= La Armada =

Dominican-American band

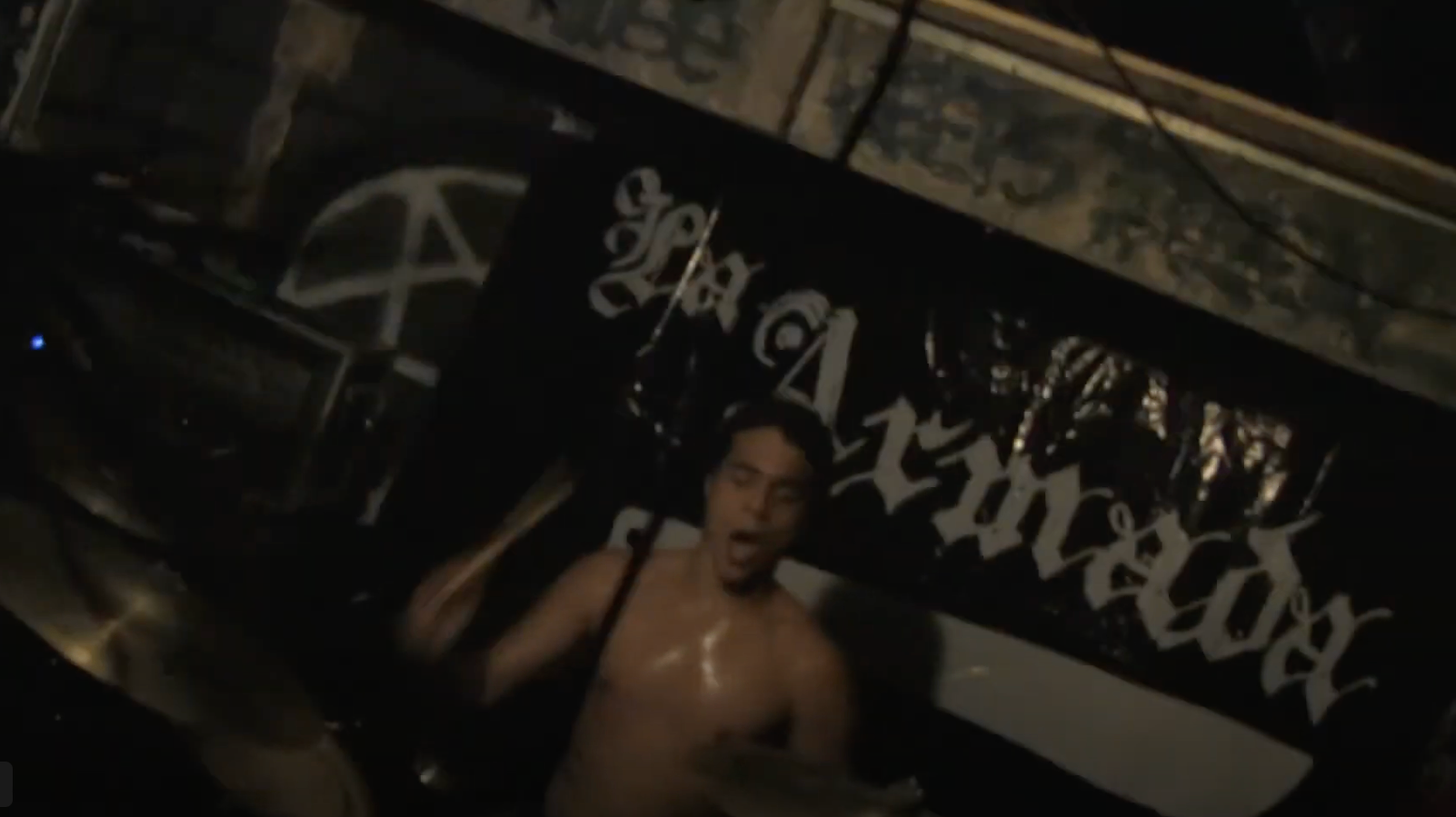

Background information
- Origin: Santo Domingo, Dominican Republic and Chicago, USA
- Genres: hardcore punk; metal
- Years active: 2001–present
- Labels: Fat Sandwich, Creep, Lockjaw, Thousand Islands, Mal De Ojo
- Members: Alberto “Mani” Marte (bass); Paúl Rivera (guitar); Eric Urrea (drums); Enrique "Quique" Vargas (lead vocals)
- Past members: Javier Fernandez (lead vocals); Luis Martinez (drums); Jonathan Salazar (guitar); Casper Torres (lead vocals)
- Website: La Armada Facebook

La Armada is a Dominican-American band formed in Santo Domingo, Dominican Republic, in 2001 and based in Chicago since 2008. They play hardcore punk and metal that incorporates traditional Caribbean beats, a style they refer to as "Latino Hardcore Fury". Their lyrics, both Spanish and English, reflect political ideals like anti-colonialism, anti-capitalism, and anti-racism. Since moving to the US, La Armada has released several EPs and three full-length albums, most recently Anti-Colonial Vol. 2 (2022). Praised for their live performances, they have toured with Sick of It All, Propagandhi, and Death by Stereo.

== History ==
=== Formation and move to the US (2001–2008) ===
La Armada formed in Santo Domingo, Dominican Republic, in 2001. The band consisted of bassist Alberto "Mani" Marte, drummer Luis Martinez, guitarists Paúl Rivera and Jonathan Salazar, and lead vocalist Javier Fernandez.

At the time, the punk and metal scene in the Dominican Republic (DR) was limited. La Armada worked to expand it by booking bands and putting on shows anywhere they could find space, including abandoned buildings and backyards. Resources were limited; Marte recalls performing at concerts where the entire 10 band line-up had to share one drum set, one guitar, and one bass guitar.

To find more opportunities as a hardcore band and escape an economic downturn, La Armada relocated to the US. In 2004, Marte moved to Florida and was eventually joined by the rest of the band. In 2006, La Armada opened for Los Crudos at a Latino punk festival in Chicago. By the following year, La Armada had moved to Chicago, due to its large Latino punk scene.

=== La Armada and Anti-Colonial Vol. 1 (2012–2018) ===
In 2012, La Armada released a self-titled album on Fat Sandwich Records, their first record since they left DR. The initial pressing of 500 copies quickly sold out. Completely in Spanish, the album covers topics like anti-capitalism, immigration, colonialism, and injustice. The first song opens with lyrics that can be translated to: "Hypocrisy! Cynicism! Falsehood! Eat shit!" One reviewer praised the album's guitar riffs and rhythms but found the lyrics to be overly aggressive. Another reviewer applauded the album's aggressiveness and noted that it was possible to sense the anger of the songs, whether or not the listener understood Spanish. Maximum Rocknroll called it one of the best albums of the year, and the album was included in Chicago Reader's "best Chicago albums of the 2010s" list. To support the album, La Armada toured with Propagandhi and Iron Chic.

Two years later, La Armada released Crisis on Profane Existence/Fat Sandwich Records. The EP includes criticism of Dominican politicians for contributing to poor living conditions, allowing foreign companies to exploit natural resources, and promoting anti-Haitian racism.

In 2018, La Armada released Anti-Colonial Vol. 1 on Creep Records. The album covers topics like policing, private prisons, xenophobia, and environmental destruction, all of which the band sees as modern-day colonialism. In their review, Metal Injection praised the album's emotion and sound and called it emblematic of hardcore punk and thrash. "Unquenchable", a track about the prison-industrial complex and immigrant detention in the US, was called "one of 2018's most urgent protest songs" by Remezcla.

=== COVID-19 and Anti-Colonial Vol. 2 (2019–Present) ===
During the COVID-19 pandemic, La Armada was forced to cancel their European tour. Long-time lead vocalist Javier Fernandez left in 2019 and was replaced by Casper Torres. Torres debuted on Songs of the Exiled I: Chicago (2020), the first in a series of EPs La Armada planned to create during COVID-19 and name after cities important to them. The title of the series is a reference to the book Cuentos Escritos en el Exilio ("Stories Written in Exile") by Juan Bosch, who returned from exile to become DR's first democratically elected president in 1963.

The Songs of the Exiled EP series was scrapped, and La Armada instead released an EP entitled Opías, in 2021. The EP covers political themes and begins with an anti-immigration sound bite from a Fox News host. Their next album, Anti-Colonial Vol. 2 (2022), was recorded over multiple sessions at Electrical Audio Studios in Chicago. Released on Lockjaw Records (UK/EU), Thousand Islands Records (CAN), and Mal De Ojo Records (USA), it includes new material as well as songs from their previous two EPs, some of which were remixed. The single, "La Fé No Abasta", is about environmental destruction and the negative impact of capitalism. One reviewer compared the album to Refused and At the Drive-In and praised its fast-paced tempo. Another reviewer applauded the complexity of the song structure and noted unexpected elements like a saxophone solo and chanting.

As of 2022, Eric Urrea is the drummer for La Armada. La Armada's September 2024 single "500 años" features new lead singer, Enrique "Quique" Vargas.

== Style and views ==
La Armada has been called "one of Chicago's (and the Midwest's) premier hardcore outfits" and "Chicago hardcore heroes". Metal Injection included them on a "8 Chicago Bands That You Need in Your Life" list. According to Spotify data from 2024, they are the most popular metal band in DR.

Primarily hardcore punk and metal, La Armada's music has evolved over time to include traditional Dominican and Caribbean beats, a style they have dubbed "Latino Hardcore Fury". Vice has described their sound as "a unique style of progressive-yet-propulsive punk-inflected metallic hardcore that marries jumpy tempos, driving riffs, sick guitar solos, and muscular technicality, while experimenting with building songs around Latin rhythms." La Armada sings in both English and Spanish and has said they avoid making music for a particular audience. In a 2014 interview with New Noise Magazine, they stated: "Some will get it, some will go out of their way to get it and some simply won't. That is all fine with us. This isn't radio rock. It is not meant to please everyone either".

Their punk and metal influences include Slayer, Dead Kennedys, Metallica, and Bad Brains, as well as Puerto Rican bands like Tropiezo, Golpe Justo, and La Experiencia. The salsa and merengue artists of their childhoods like Los Hermanos Rosario, Fania, and Los Kenton have also influenced their music. Their live performances have been praised as "fantastic", "fierce", "vicious", jaw-dropping, and unmatched. La Armada has toured with Sick of It All, Propagandhi, Iron Chic, and Death by Stereo.

Outspoken about their political beliefs, La Armada has criticized colonialism, the prison-industrial complex, the targeting of undocumented immigrants, racism, corrupt politicians, and Donald Trump. They have supported and fundraised for groups like the ACLU, No Cop Academy, Chicago Boricua Resistance, a music school in Gaza, and a community kitchen in Puerto Rico. According to the Chicago Reader, "Everything they do is in the service of a rage for justice and a hard-earned catharsis", while Metal Injection has called their music "a straight up middle finger to oppression and all forms of injustice."

== Discography ==
- La Armada (2012)
- Crisis EP (2014)
- Anti-Colonial Vol. 1 (2018)
- Songs of the Exiled I: Chicago EP (2020)
- Opías EP (2021)
- Anti-Colonial Vol. 2 (2022)
