= Area 12 (band) =

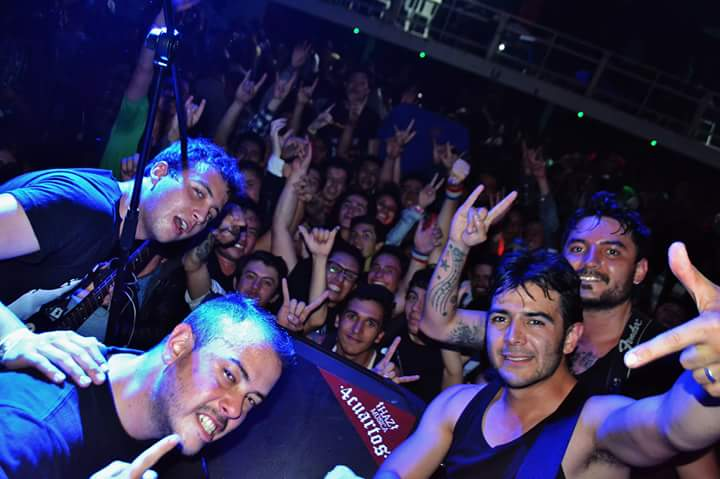
- Area 12 live in Bogota

Background information
- Origin: Bogotá, Colombia
- Genres: Punk rock, hardcore punk, skate punk, melodic hardcore
- Years active: 1998–present
- Labels: The Box, Kre y Kom
- Members: Roberto Perez; Jose David Perez; Ivan Urrea; Carlos Cortes
- Past members: Juan Rivas; Omar Figueroa; Felipe Tavera; Adrian Pucheu; Gian Paolo Cassalins; Daniel Nieto

Area 12 is a melodic punk rock band from Bogotá, Colombia. The band was founded in 1998 as a school project. They started out playing in small bars and venues in Bogotá. It was not an easy start, full of adversity. They contributed meaningfully to the creation of a Punk Rock scene in the city. They are considered to be one of the pioneer bands of Colombian punk rock. Their influences include punk rock, melodic punk, Latin punk and hard core punk. They have been strongly influenced by bands such as NOFX and Bad Religion. They have reached a mature and diverse sound over the years, creating their own lyric and musical style. They have performed with bands such as Ska-p, Die toten hosen, MxPx, Voodoo Glow Skulls, and Joey Cape from Lagwagon.

== History ==
The band was founded by Roberto Perez and his brother Jose Perez in 1998. They recorded their first EP called Live it my way in 1999. In 2000 and 2001, they participated in two main punk rock compilation albums in Colombia: Neo travel kit and Neobox Punk Compilation. The band released their first album in 2002. Un alto en el camino consolidated Area 12 as one of the most relevant Colombian bands. With a difficult underground market and more than 5000 copies sold, the band released their second album No me vas a joder in 2005. After touring around the country, Area 12 recorded the song Aquí Estaré. The song reached the radio after participating in a contest organized by Radioakctiva, Hard Rock Cafe Bogota and CityTv Bogota. They started a local tour with Radioacktiva and also recorded the Rock and Gol opening theme, which made part of this popular radio sport show, and opened the doors to international concerts. They celebrated 10 years of musical career in 2008. After one of the founder members left the band, Area 12 released their third album Desaparecidos in 2009. This album was mastered in Los Angeles and was a trampoline for the band and they were invited to play along with international bands. In 2012 they released the EP El fin de la ciudad which included a crude video about the situation in Bogotá.

== Discography ==
=== Studio albums ===
- Live it my way (1999)
- Un alto en el amino (2002)
- No me vas a joder (2005)
- Desaparecidos (2009)
- El fin de la ciudad (2012)

=== Compilation albums ===
- Neo Travel Kit (2000)
- Neobox Punk Compilation (2001)
- Tribulo a la Polla Records (2003)
- Louder Heart (2007)
- Radioacktiva Lo Mejor del Planeta Rock (2007)

=== Single ===
- Aquí Estaré (2007)
- Yo no soy pirata (2009)
- El fin de la ciudad (2012)

== Members ==
- Roberto Perez - Lead vocals and lead guitar
- Jose David Perez - Drums
- Ivan Urrea - Rhythm guitar
- Carlos Cortes - Bass
