= Colince Ngaha Poungoue =

Ukrainian professional footballer

Colince Ngaha
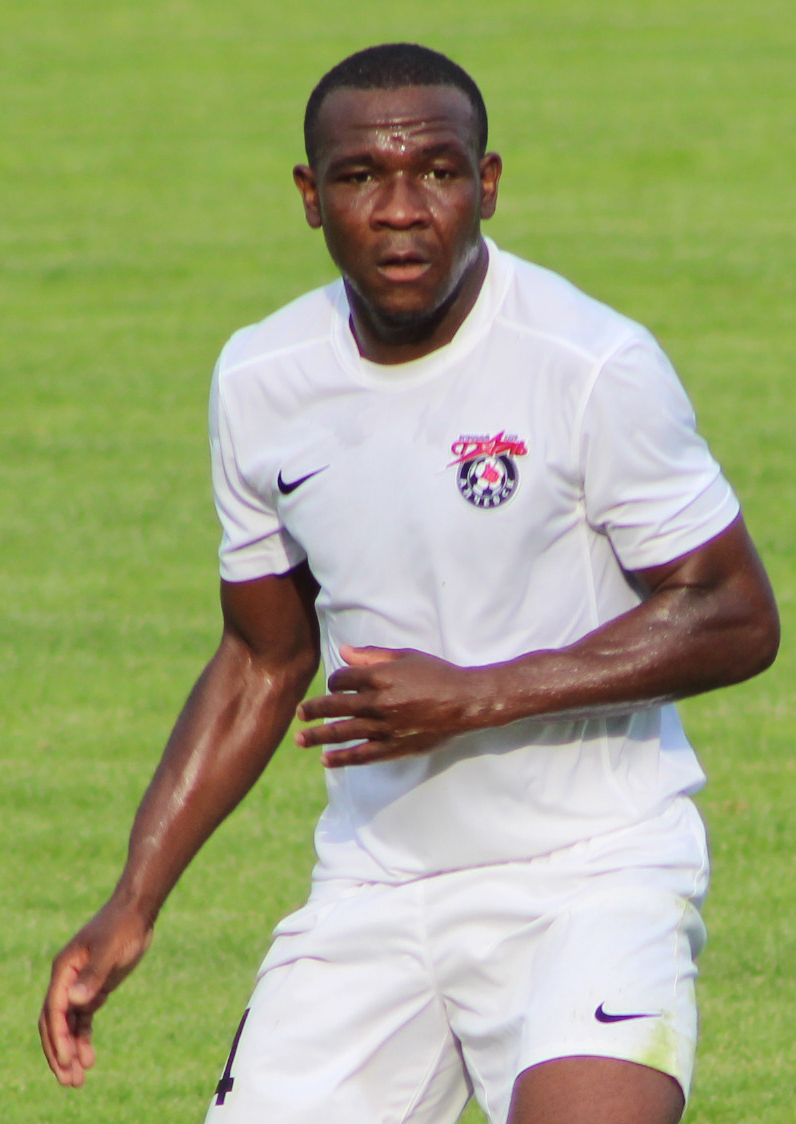

Personal information
- Full name: Colince Ngaha Poungoue
- Date of birth: September 26, 1981 (age 45)
- Place of birth: Buea, Cameroon
- Height: 1.75 m (5 ft 9 in)
- Position: Forward

Youth career
- 2005–2006: Bamboutos FC

Senior career*
Years	Team	Apps	(Gls)
2004	Krasyliv-Obolon	2	(0)
2006–2008	Nistru Otaci	57	(19)
2008	Zorya Luhansk	1	(1)
2010–2014	Stal Alchevsk	113	(10)
2014–2015	Vinnytsia (amauters)	16	(3)
2015	Avanhard Kramatorsk	18	(0)
2015–2016	Vinnytsia (amauters)	14	(1)
2016–2017	Nyva-V Vinnytsia	46	(6)
2017	Ahro-Astra (amateurs)	4	(0)

Managerial career
- 2016: Nyva-V Vinnytsia (interim)
- 2019: Nyva Vinnytsia
- * Club domestic league appearances and goals as of 30 November 2017

Colince Ngaha Poungoue (born 26 September 1981) is a former Ukrainian professional footballer who played as a striker. He is of Cameroonian descent. After retiring from playing, Poungoue also worked as a manager. He became the first Afro-Ukrainian athlete who was appointed a head coach of professional club in Ukraine.

== Career ==
In 2006–2008 Colince played for Moldovan club from town of Otaci over Dniester that lies near Ukrainian town of Mohyliv-Podilskyi also upon Dniester.

With Moldovan club Colince played at continental competitions, the 2007–08 UEFA Cup, against the Hungarian side Budapest Honvéd.

During the 2008 summer transfer season, he transferred to Zorya from Moldovan Premier League side Nistru Otaci. Due to an injury in 2008, Colince only played one game at the top league scoring his first and his last goal at the Ukrainian Premier League. Later he managed to recover and transferred to FC Stal Alchevsk in 2010. Until dissolution in 2015, he played at the Alchevsk club. After that moved back to Podillia (Vinnytsia).

In 2016 Ngaha has acted as a head coach after dismissal of Solovyanenko.

In 2019 he was already appointed as a full-pledged head coach of the club.

== Personal life ==
Ngaha graduated Technical University in Vinnytsia. He is married with a Ukrainian woman and has two children Ivan and Christian. Ivan Ngaha actively trains at the Dynamo Kyiv Football School.

In August 2017 Colince Ngaha got a Ukrainian citizenship.

Ngaha also established own football school in Vinnytsia for children. He is a polyglot knowing English, French, Russian, and Ukrainian languages.
