= Fatty Cakes and the Puff Pastries =

American punk band

Background information
- Origin: Fresno, California
- Genres: Queercore, indie pop, riot grrrl, punk
- Instruments: Electric Ukulele, Bass Guitar, Drum Kit, Synthesizer, Glockenspiel, Omnichord
- Works: Fatty Cakes and the Puff Pastries (self-titled) Emotional Response Records, 2018; Typical Girls Volume 3 Compilation – 2018 Emotional Response Records; Panic Attack Single 2018; Feminist Gold 2K – 2016; Sampler Platter - 2015; Alien Babe – 2014 single; 1998 Lisa Frank Diary – 2013
- Years active: 2011–present
- Label: Emotional Response Records
- Members: Amber Fargano; Vishinna Turner; Audrey Paris Johnson; Victoria Crow; Staci McDowell
- Website: https://fattycakes.bandcamp.com

Fatty Cakes and the Puff Pastries are a punk band from Fresno, California, consisting of members Amber Fargano, Vishinna Turner, Audrey Paris Johnson, Victoria Crow, and Staci McDowell. Their music has been described by outlets such as LA Times, She Shreds, and Nylon as queercore feminist pop and riot grrl. The band is known for creating empowering environments for fans at live shows.

== History ==
Fatty Cakes and the Puff Pastries formed in 2011, originally as Amber Fargano's solo project.

Before Fatty Cakes and the Puff Pastries, Vishinna Turner, Audrey Johnson, and Amber Fargano played in a band called Strawberry Jam who were an active part of the Fresno DIY Friendcore scene that was centralized in Fresno's Chinatown neighborhood in underground venues like Infoshop and the Chinatown Youth Center during the 2000s to the 2010s.

Fargano invited bassist and vocalist Vishinna Turner, as well as vocalists and synth/glockenspiel players Crow and McDowell to join as dancers, who quickly became integral to the band. Audrey Johnson, who at the time was playing for Fresno-based DIY band Needy Eevy, joined on drums. Fargano and McDowell were friends from school and attended drama class together as kids.

Fatty Cakes and the Puff Pastries are a diverse band composed of queer working class musicians. Fargano and McDowell are white, Crow is Chukchansi, Turner is Black with Choctaw and Blackfoot ancestry, and Johnson is of Black and Mexican ancestry. They are influenced heavily by punk and riot grrrl, and use their music to advocate for feminism, anti-racism, and fat positivity.

== Notable shows ==
The band has played concerts at DIY venues across the United States, and have played at venues like the Great American Music Hall. They have played special gigs like a tour of Girls Rock Camps across the west coast, Weirdo Night, Folsom Street Fair in both 2022 and 2023, and at the Bob Baker Marionette Theater accompanied by a cast of puppets.

In 2021 the band collaborated with Fresno City College art show and exhibition called "constellating care networks" highlighting the history and presence of Fresno's LGBTQIA community.

== Musical themes ==
Fargano explicitly chose the group's name because they wanted people to have to say the word "fat" in a positive context. Vishinna Turner has talked about how playing music has helped her embrace body-acceptance. In an interview with Virgie Tovar, Vishinna noted that their song "Fat Girl Tears" is about people being scared of having a "body like yours" and living through trauma, loving your body, and refusing to make yourself small.

Fresno pride is important to them as well, the band has remained dedicated to living in and representing Fresno. The band has been open about some of their struggles coming from a conservative town that hasn't always embraced their music or identities, as well as the power of staying there. Victoria Crow told the LA Times that her relationship to Fresno is complicated, saying: "Being Chukchansi, one of the many tribes that are indigenous to the Central Valley, my love and pride for this city is generational and ancestral." For her, Fresno life is a combination of deep roots, messy house-parties, best friends and perseverance.

Friendship and collectivity is important to the group. When asked about what it means to be a "Grrrl Gang" by Nylon, the band mentioned upholding friends and making sure people feel safe at shows is important to them, and in a 2022 interview with the LA Times they talked about keeping a Hello Kitty baseball bat in their tour-van for safety.

The band collectively writes lyrics and shares in the process of songwriting. The song "Panic Attack" was based on a bass riff that Turner played while rehearsing at Studio Itz, a Fresno arts institution. The liner notes of their recordings credit all members with contributing lyrics and ideas for songs. Their song "Best Friend" is about the friendships between all of the members of the band.

== Eponymous record ==
Fatty Cakes and the Puff Pastries was released on vinyl and cassette tape by Emotional Response Records in 2018. It was produced by Alice Bag and recorded at Station House Studios by Mark Rains in Echo Park during the fall of 2017, and mastered by Margot Padilla.

The band had a lunch with Alice Bag at Vishinna Turner's mothers restaurant and became close friends before deciding to go into the studio together. In an interview with Nylon, Amber Fargano said that they felt like the album showed their "strong political voice, a strong voice based in empowerment, and a personal voice sharing truth... that will make [listeners] laugh, think, and rage."

== Affiliated projects ==
The band are active members of the Bruise Violet Collective, Fresno based musicians, writers, and artists who organize events catering to marginalized identities. Vishinna Turner and Audrey Johnson also play in the Fresno-based band Squid Ink who are known for challenging anti-Blackness in punk.

Audrey Johnson started playing drums in high school in jazz band and marching band, and has recorded and performed with Needy Evie, Omar Rodriguez Lopez Group, The Eighteen Hundreds, Dirty Limbs, and currently plays drums for La Luz and Teri Gender Bender in addition to Fatty Cakes and the Puff Pastries.

== Members ==
- Amber Fargano – lead vocals, electric ukulele, organ
- Vishinna Turner – vocals, bass guitar
- Audrey Paris Johnson – drums
- Victoria Crow – vocals, glockenspiel
- Staci McDowell – vocals, keyboards

== Discography ==
- Fatty Cakes and the Puff Pastries – Emotional Response Records, 2018
- Typical Girls Volume 3 Compilation – Emotional Response Records, 2018
- Panic Attack – 2018
- Feminist Gold 2K – 2016
- Sampler Platter – 2015
- Alien Babe – 2014
- 1998 Lisa Frank Diary – 2013
