= Latino punk =

Punk rock music created by Latino

Latino punk is punk music created by Latino people in Latin America and the United States. The angst and protest qualities of punk music and style have had a strong appeal to Latino youth in the U.S., and to the people in Latin America. It is impossible to pinpoint the exact location or moment when Latinos began engaging in the punk subculture. However, Latin American rock began showing aspects of punk music during the mid-1960s with the Peruvian band Los Saicos; this band reflected many aspects of other proto-punk bands such as the Yardbirds. The Saicos were predecessors to some of the most influential proto-punk bands in the U.S., such as New York Dolls, MC5, and The Stooges

Punk music began engaging a wider variety of artists and audience in the late 1970s and 1980s, either in Latin America or in the U.S. By the mid-1970s, the aesthetics promoted by glam rock in the United Kingdom had created a social gap between the audience and the artist. The punk scene that began to sprout during that era shared more commonalities with the youth audience, while still retaining some attributes from glam rock.

Punk music presented itself as the voice for white teenage angst, without the arrogance and verbosity of glam rock. The punk genre rooted itself in a music and style that created by the working class without the intellectual posturing of its previous genres. It was a genre created by and for the white working class in the United Kingdom. During the late 1970s, punk's social basis for creating commonalities with its fans, and its integration of style and instruments from reggae allowed for punk bands of different ethnicities to integrate themselves into the social scene in the United Kingdom.

== Latino/Chicano Punk ==
In the late 1970s, many punk bands began appearing in Los Angeles, among them many Latino and Chicano punks like The Zeros, The Stains, The Plugz, The Bags, Thee Undertakers, Nervous Gender, The Brat, The Gun Club, Los Illegals, Los Angelinos, Felix and the Katz, Odd Squad, Union 13, and The Cruzados. Most of these bands did not consider themselves Latino punk bands, but artists challenging the mainstream just like their non-Latino peers.

However, in the late 1970s Latino/Chicano punks in East L.A began organizing gigs in their own communities. These bands were part of a punk movement called The East Side Renaissance, who dedicated themselves to bringing to light the local Chicano/Latino bands in their own neighborhoods.

=== Latin American/Chicano hardcore punk ===
The Latino hardcore punk scene in the U.S. exploded during the 1990s due to all the political issues facing Latinos, such as Prop 187, NAFTA and the Zapatista Uprising. Policies that specifically targeted the Latino community all across the U.S. during the 90s pushed Latinos and Latinas to begin singing and writing hardcore punk as a form of angst and protest. Bands from cites like New York, Chicago, El Paso, Texas, Los Angeles, and Santa Fe, New Mexico had prominent hardcore Latino punk bands in the 1990s. Among the most notable Latino hardcore punk bands were:

- Huasipungo
- Los Crudos
- Arma Contra Arma
- Tras de Nada
- Youth Against
- No Less
- Sbitch
- Kontraattaque
- Subsistencia
- Life’s Halt
- Logical Nonsense
- Empirismo

In contrast to their white punk peers, these bands were discriminated against for singing about the struggles of minorities that whites did not want to hear about. Latino hardcore punk bands began to sing about the direct problems that they, their families, and their Latino communities were facing. The themes of these problems were the violation of immigrant rights; particularly the abuse of Latino immigrant workers.

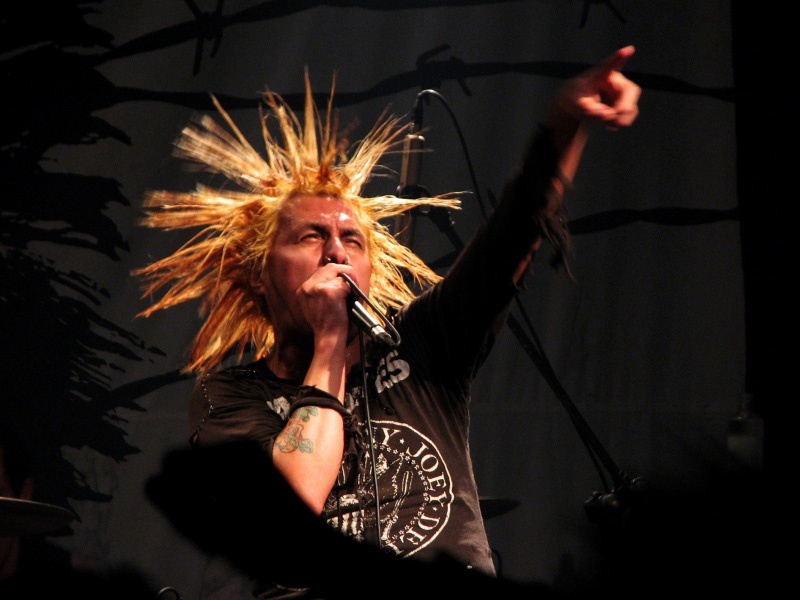
Jorge Herrera, founder and former frontman of New York street punk band The Casualties was born in the city of Guayaquil in Ecuador.

Up to these days there are several Latino members among many prominent American punk bands, such as Roger Miret from Agnostic Front, Freddy Cricien from Madball, Mike Muir from Suicidal Tendencies, Kid Congo Powers from The Gun Club, Ron Reyes from Black Flag, Mario Rubalcaba from Hot Snakes, and Jorge Herrera from The Casualties, among others, having written several songs in Spanish as a homage to their Latin American roots. La Armada, founded by Dominican-Americans, incorporates traditional Caribbean beats into their hardcore punk and metal.

== 1970s Latin American punk ==
Little known outside Latin America, Latin punk was a huge sensation among teens in countries like Argentina, Brazil, Colombia, and Mexico during the 1970s. Several of these countries shared a history of dictatorship, poverty and political oppression, about which these Latin American teens began to sing and play.

In the late 1970s, Mexico, Argentina and Brazil had popular punk bands well-established within their music circuits and some of them touring nationwide. In both Mexico and Argentina specifically the punk scene was large due to affluent youth who had the means to obtain the music of bands from the United Kingdom and the U.S.

- In Brazil on the other hand, Douglas Viscaino was interested in the ideology of the youth revolting against the military regime of the nation. Bands such as his Restos de Nada, Coquetel Molotov (from Rio de Janeiro), AI-5, and N.A.I were among the founders of Brazilian punk.
- In Argentina, the punk scene depended in the ability to travel and gain knowledge of the punk scene, due to the military regime's media censorship. Bands such as Los Testiculos, Sumo, Los Violadores, and others who cemented punk in Argentina were followed by bands like Los Baraja, Alerta Roja, Comando Suicida, Los Inadaptables, and Trixy y Los Maniaticos.
- The first wave of Punk bands in Mexico during the late 70's had bands such as Dangerous Rhythm, Size, Serpentis, Hospital X, and The Casuals singing mostly in English, alienating them from the marginalized youth of their nation but earning them considerable radio and TV airplay. A second wave of Punk inspired in the working class struggle of the average Mexican gave birth to bands such as Rebel 'D Punk, Solución Mortal, Sedición, Masacre 68, Disolucion Social, Atoxxxico, Herejía, and Síndrome del Punk. The 1980s would become the true fulfillment of punk in Mexico and Latin America.

== 1980s Latin American punk ==
By the 1980s punk was well established in multiple nations of Latin America. Punk became a form of resistance among the youth of Latin America, in which they spoke against the establishment of their countries, which was completely dangerous. For in Chile during the 1970s the separation of rock music, and musician was one of the key points the dictatorship focused on overpowering. The youth followed the ideology of DIY, in order to create space in which created and alternative to their livelihoods.

=== Punk in Mexico ===
The first Mexican punk bands emerged from the middle classes of Mexico City with bands such as Size, Dangerous Rhythm, Serpentis and Hospital X, inspired by both New York and London punk scenes. Although this first wave sang mostly in English, their music gained considerable airplay and press coverage earning them TV appearances and opening slots for bands like The Police and The Plugz during their first ever concerts in Mexico.

Early 80's gave birth to a second wave of punk inspired by a more aggressive street and hardcore sound, mostly formed by marginalized minorities from cities like Guadalajara, Tijuana and Estado de México such as Sedición, Solución Mortal, Masacre 68, Atoxxxico and Síndrome del Punk, hosting DIY concerts in Mexico for bands like MDC and Dead Kennedys.

In more recent times, Mexican punk has a wide range of styles and sub-genres like the US and Europe movements.

=== Punk in Colombia ===
In Colombia punk emerged amid national unrest, during an era in which there was a major war between narco-traffickers and the government of Colombia. Complot was one of the earliest bands there, and got its start playing covers of bands such as the Clash, the Buzzcocks and others. Within the realms of hardcore-punk La Pestilencia and Mougue emerged as the main contenders in the style in Colombia to date. The epicenter of punk in Colombia was Bogotá with bands such as Chite and Area 12; but Colombia’s peripheries also had popular bands.

=== Punk in Peru ===
Peru is especially important to the Latino punk genre, with significant contributions in the mid-1960s with Los Saicos. Los Saicos played a key role in the genre of punk, being considered at times the first real punk band. The 1987 documentary El Grito Subterraneo (The Underground Scream), presented interviews of youth in the movement, and outside officials trying to understand the movement, as well as performances in Peru at the time, such as Voz propia, Leusemia, Eutanasia, Kaos, Flema, Narcosis, Maria Teta, Empujon Brutal, Sinkura, Guerrilla Urbana, and others.

=== Punk in Brazil ===
Brazil was producing mixtapes in the early 1980s with a hardcore sound, as well as an early punk festivals. Yet in the mid-1980s, between punks, skinheads, and metal head, punk began to take an early post-punk turn, with bands such as Inocentes, Mercenárias and 365.

== See also ==
- Cojoba
- Mas alla de los Gritos
- La Movida Madrileña
- Rock en español
- Argentine rock
- Mexican rock
- Avanzada Regia
