= Lengua Armada Discos =

American independent record label

- Founder: Martin Sorrondeguy
- Genre: Punk rock, hardcore punk
- Country of origin: United States

Lengua Armada Discos is an American DIY punk and hardcore punk independent record label created by Martin Sorrondeguy, vocalist of Los Crudos and Limp Wrist. It began as an outlet for Los Crudos and later released recordings by bands from Chicago and other countries.

== History ==
Lengua Armada was created after Los Crudos decided to issue its own first record instead of seeking another label. The band's first single was the label's first vinyl release. Initially a joint project, members of Los Crudos helped make record covers, while Sorrondeguy handled mail order and administration; the other members continued contributing through about 1996.

In a 2005 interview, Sorrondeguy estimated that the label had issued about 39 releases. He described its outlook as global rather than exclusively Chicago-based, citing releases by bands from Mexico, Israel and Spain. The label did not use written contracts and generally worked with bands connected to Sorrondeguy or Los Crudos through touring, correspondence or local punk scenes. Sorrondeguy said he treated the label as part-time DIY work rather than a conventional business.

In 2012, the label released Las 4 Bandas, a remastered vinyl reissue of a 1985 cassette compiling four Peruvian punk bands. In January 2019, it released Mock Execution's Reality Attack EP. Later in 2019, Sorrondeguy said that the label still issued records occasionally but was not run as a business.

== Selected artists ==
Artists whose recordings were released by Lengua Armada include:

- Los Crudos
- Charles Bronson
- Limp Wrist
- Look Back and Laugh
- MK-Ultra
- Sin Orden

== See also ==
- List of record labels
- Latino punk
