= Rollings =

Rollings is an English surname originating from the Norman given name Radulphus. Notable people with the surname include:

- Andy Rollings (born 1954), English football centre back
- Gordon Rollings (1926–1985), English actor
- Matt Rollings (born 1964), American musician
- Red Rollings (1904–1964), American reserve infielder
- Wayne Rollings (1941–2022), Marine commanding general

== See also ==
- Philippe Hamilton-Rollings, Ukrainian football defender
- Danny Rolling, American serial killer
- Rowlings
