= Limp Wrist =

American punk band

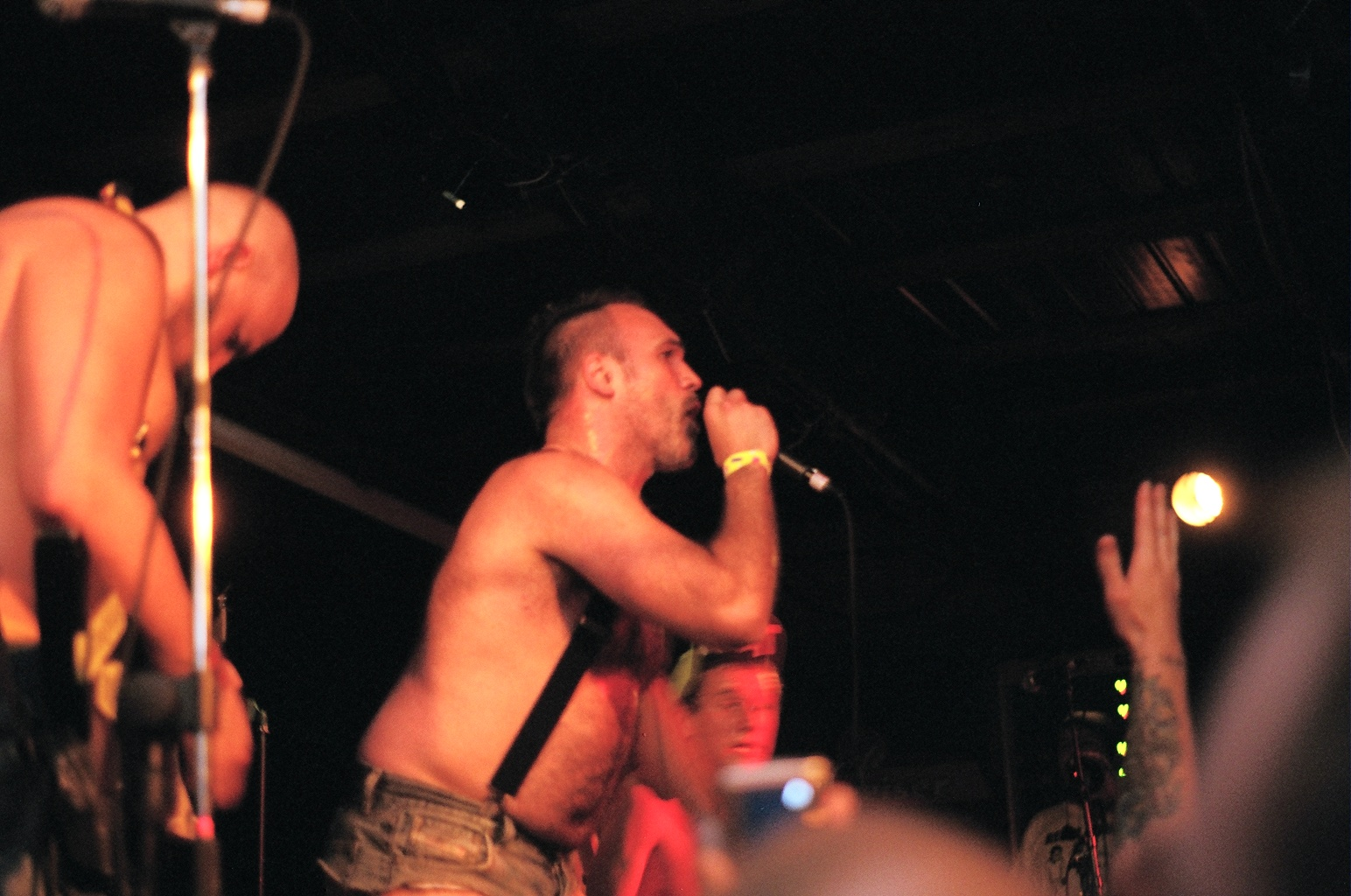
- Limp Wrist in Austin, Texas in 2006

Background information
- Origin: Albany, New York, U.S.
- Genres: Hardcore punk, queercore, powerviolence
- Years active: 1998–present
- Label: self-released
- Members: Martin Sorrondeguy; Scott Moore; Andrew Martini; Paul Henry
- Past members: Mark Telfian
- Website: www.facebook.com/limpwristpunx/

Limp Wrist is an American punk rock band, who formed in 1998. Featuring members of Los Crudos, Hail Mary, Devoid of Faith, By the Throat, and Kill the Man Who Questions, the band plays short, fast hardcore music, and covers themes concerning the gay community in their live performances and lyrics. They are an openly gay band and they identify as part of the "queercore" punk subculture. The band declared in Frontiers magazine, "We put the 'core' back in 'Queercore'". The band are featured on the cover of My Brain Hurts, Liz Baillie's comic about queer teenagers in New York City.

After the break up of Los Crudos, Martin Sorrondeguy, and the original guitarist, Mark Telfian, came up with the idea to form a band. They are an openly gay band and they identify as part of the queercore subculture. They then asked the bassist Andrew Martini, and original drummer, Scott Moore, who were living in Philadelphia to join up for a first practice which was held in Philadelphia in late 1998. After a few weekends of practice, a first gig was set up in Philadelphia at Stalag 13 on June 13, 1999. The members have never all lived in the same city and thus play infrequently, except for an occasional tour.

== Background ==
Their first recording was the self-released demo Don't Knock It Till You Try It. This was followed by a single called "What’s Up With The Kids" and then the self-titled LP Limp Wrist. However, since band members lived in different states maintaining the group became difficult. After an interlude they resumed touring in 2004 and released a new CD, Complete Discography the same year. The song "Ode" from this recording pays tribute to pioneering gay hardcore musicians Gary Floyd of The Dicks, Randy Turner of Big Boys and Joshua Plague of Mukilteo Fairies and Behead the Prophet, No Lord Shall Live, providing a historical context for Limp Wrist.

The band's best known song was "I Love Hardcore Boys, I Love Boys Hardcore", which received much attention from fans and press alike. Lead singer Martin Sorrondeguy appears in Queercore: A Punk-u-mentary by Scott Treleaven and addresses the issue implicit in these song titles.

In 2002, Maximum RockNRoll featured Martin Sorrondeguy in its "QueerPunk" issue, in discussion with Gary Fembot and Iraya Robles of Sta-Prest, and Aaron Detroit of The Little Deaths.

In 1999, Sorrondeguy released his own documentary film, Beyond The Screams: A U.S. Latino Hardcore Punk Documentary. He had begun the film while still a member of his former band Los Crudos.

In 2006, Limp Wrist released the split label 7", "Want Us Dead" on Cheap Art/Lengua Armada.

In 2009, the band also self-released a 7-song 12" record in the US. The European version of this release, by La Vida Es Un Mus, contains the "Want Us Dead" record on side B.

== Members ==
Current members

- Martin Sorrondeguy – vocals (1998–present)
- Scott Moore – drums (1998–2000); guitar (2004–present)
- Andrew Martini – bass (1998–present)
- Paul Henry – drums (2000–present)

Former members

- Mark Telfian – guitar (1998–2004)

== Discography ==
=== Albums ===
Year	Album details
2000	Don't Knock It Till You Try It: Released: 2000; Labels: Self-released
2008	Limp Wrist: Released: June 1, 2008; Labels: Lengua Armada Discos in US, La Vida Es Un Mus in Europe LP/CD
2017	Facades: Released: August 2, 2017; Labels: Self-released

=== Singles ===
- "What's Up with the Kids", Paralogy Records (2001)
- "Split", 7" split singles with Knifed (2003)
- "Want Us Dead". 7" split release by Cheap-Art and Lengua Armada (July 2005)

=== Compilations ===
- Perversos Desviados, 7" compilation on Sebo Registres fonomagnetiques (Argentina) (2000)
- Histeria – Lengua Armada compilation LP
- Mein Comp, Youth Attack, 7" compilation
- Barbaric Thrash Demolition II, 625 Records, 7" compilation
- Limp Wrist - Thee Official Discography – Cheap-Art Records CD (2005)
- Public Safety, LP/CD Maximum RockNRoll (2006)

== See also ==
- List of hardcore punk bands
