= Nikt Nic Nie Wie =

Polish independent record label

- Founded: 1989
- Genre: Punk rock
- Country of origin: Poland
- Official website: http://www.nnnw.pl/index_e.html

Nikt Nic Nie Wie (meaning Nobody Knows Nothing in Polish) is the first Polish independent record label. The label started in 1989 with the motto "podkładamy nogi tym, którzy nie chcą o nas słyszeć". ("We are sticking our legs out for those who do not want to hear about us to trip over.") Activities include distribution, organizing concerts, promotion of culture and independent music. Some of their releases include: Włochaty, Oi Polloi, Odszukać listopad, Už Jsme Doma, Apatia, Chumbawamba, Crass. The first record issued by the label was Na Własne Podobieństwo by punk rock band Inkwizycja, making it the very first independent record release in Poland.
