= Warm Water Cove =

Park in San Francisco, California

Coordinates: 37°45′16″N 122°23′1″W

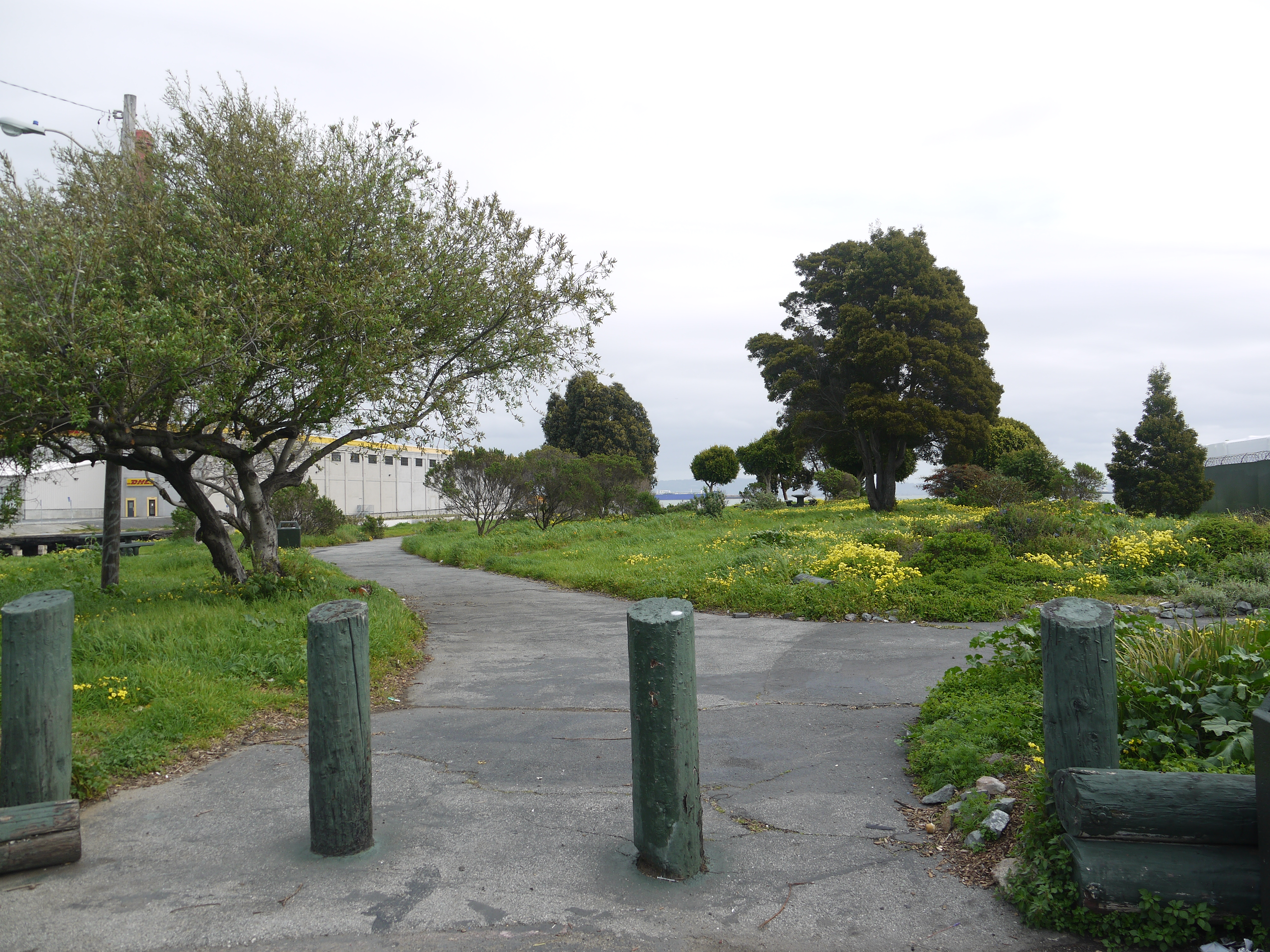
Entrance to Warm Water Cove Park

Warm Water Cove is an outdoor, formerly industrialized picnic area in San Francisco, California, located near Pier 80 and the Dogpatch neighborhood.

The park contains works of graffiti art, abandoned warehouses, and punk concerts. Free, all-ages shows are set up a few times every month by local Bay Area and touring musicians. Along with 924 Gilman Street, it is one of a few punk rock venues in the Bay Area where D.I.Y. music is performed.

The park underwent some cleanup and renovation in 2007.

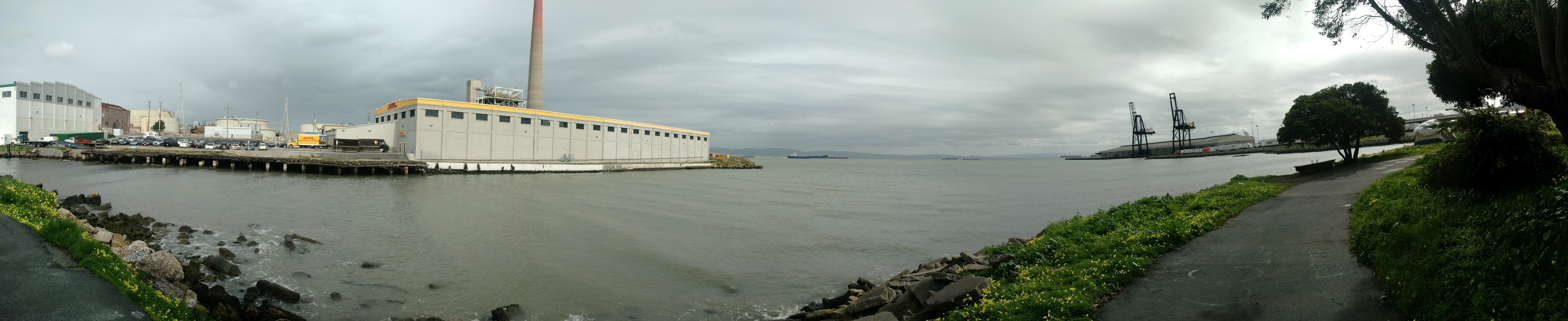
Panorama of view from the park
