= Radioacktiva =

Coordinates: 4.598056°N 74.075833°W

Colombia
- Broadcast area: Bogotá
- Frequency: 97.9 MHz
- Branding: HJJK

Programming
- Format: Rock
- Affiliations: Caracol Radio

Ownership
- Owner: Caracol Radio

History
- First air date: 1989
- Former call signs: HJRX
- Former frequencies: 102.9 MHz (1989–2001)

Links
- Website: http://www.radioacktiva.com/

Radioacktiva is a Colombian radio station broadcasting from Bogotá. It is owned by Caracol Radio, part of the Spanish media organization Grupo PRISA. It started broadcasting in 1989 programming both rock and pop music. In 1997 it was reformatted to focus on rock music. In 2001 it would switch frequencies with sister station Tropicana Estéreo.

== Programmes ==
=== El gallo ===
It is the station's flagship programme, broadcast on weekdays from 06:00 to 10:00. As it is usual in the morning zoo genre, El gallo relies on the integration with the audience by offering prizes (concerts tickets, CDs, T-shirts) in funny contests and quizzes.

=== R8ck / R20ck ===
R8ck ("Rock 8") is the daily countdown of the station, broadcast on weekday evenings. The weekly countdown is R20ck ("Rock 20"), on Saturdays between 12:00 and 14:00. Before the Planeta rock era, the weekly countdown was the Top 40.

=== El duelo ===
The programme features two artists' songs so as to present them to voting. Fans can vote either by phone or internet. It is broadcast jointly with R8ck.
