= The Plugz =

American punk band

Background information
- Origin: Los Angeles, California, U.S.
- Genres: Punk rock, rock
- Years active: 1977–1984

The Plugz (also known as "Los Plugz") were a Latino punk band from Los Angeles that formed in 1977 and disbanded in 1984. They and The Zeros were among the first Latino punk bands, although several garage rock bands, such as Thee Midniters and Question Mark & the Mysterians, predated them. The Plugz melded the spirit of punk and Latino music.

== History ==
The band was formed in 1977 and was a contemporary of the bands featured in the film The Decline of Western Civilization. Their songs reflected the anger and angst of growing up Chicano, and this was reflected in their sardonic hi-speed version of Ritchie Valens' "La Bamba". The Plugz are generally acknowledged as being the first D.I.Y. punk band in L.A., having started their own PLUGZ RECORDS and later Fatima records.

The band was initially composed of:

- Tito Larriva (lead vocals/guitar)
- Charlie Quintana (drums) (d. 2018)
- Barry McBride (bass/backing vocals)

This lineup recorded the band's first album, Electrify Me, produced and engineered by Alan Kutner, and released in 1979. The Plugz melded the spirit of punk and Latino music.

After McBride left (sometime in 1979–80), he was replaced by John Curry from The Flyboys, who left to form Choir Invisible less than a year later. Larriva and Curry wrote the title track to the second album Better Luck. The musicians on the band's second album, Better Luck (1981), were:

- Tito Larriva (lead vocals/guitar)
- Charlie Quintana (drums) (credited as "Chalo Quintana")

Guests:

- Gustavo Santaolalla (bass/guitars/charango/backing vocals)
- Aníbal Kerpel (keyboards)
- Steve Berlin (saxophone)
- Bruce Fowler (trombone)
- Steve Fowler (saxophone)
- Brian Qualls (piano)

Tony Marsico joined the band in late 1980, and Steven Hufsteter began playing lead guitar with the group in 1984.

With the addition of Steven Hufsteter on lead guitar, The Plugz also feature prominently on the soundtrack to the movie Repo Man. The group performed "Hombre Secreto," a Spanish version of Johnny Rivers' "Secret Agent Man", "El Clavo y la Cruz" and original instrumental background music for the film, part of which appears on the soundtrack as Reel Ten.

Plugz bassist Tony Marsico and drummer Charlie Quintana together with their friend, guitar player JJ Holiday, accompanied Bob Dylan on his appearance on Late Night with David Letterman on March 22, 1984, for three songs: "Don't Start Me Talkin'" (by Sonny Boy Williamson), "Jokerman", and "License to Kill".

In 1984, The Plugz name was retired and the three members continued as the Cruzados with Steven Hufsteter.

The Plugz reunited the three founding members for The Masque 30th Anniversary Party and Book Release show on November 11, 2007, at The Echoplex in the Echo Park district of Los Angeles, California.

== Discography ==
- "Move // Mindless Contentment / Let Go" single on Slash Records (1978)
- Electrify Me (1979) PLUGZ RECORDS
- "Achin' / La Bamba" single on Fatima Records (1981)
- Better Luck (1981)
- Los Angelinos – the eastside renaissance (compilation) (1983)
- Repo Man soundtrack (1984)
- Bob Dylan & The Plugz (1984)
- New Wave Hookers soundtrack – Electrify Me (1985)
- We're Desperate: The L.A. Scene 1976-79 - Rhino compilation (1993) "La Bamba"

=== Track listing – Electrify Me (1979) ===
1. "A Gain – A Loss" (Tito Larriva)
2. "The Cause" (Tito Larriva)
3. "Electrify Me" (Tito Larriva)
4. "Satisfied Die" (Tito Larriva/Barry McBride)
5. "La Bamba" (public domain)
6. "Adolescent" (Tito Larriva)
7. "Braintime" (Tito Larriva)
8. "Wordless" (Tito Larriva)
9. "Let Go" (Tito Larriva/Barry McBride)
10. "Infection" (Tito Larriva)
11. "Berserktown" (Tito Larriva)

== In popular culture ==
- The Plugz' song "Adolescent" was used in the film Scarred (1984).
- The Plugz' song "Electrify Me" was used in the adult film New Wave Hookers (1985).

== See also ==
- Chicano music
- Latino punk
