= Comando Suicida =

Argentine punk band formed in 1984

Comando Suicida was an Argentine punk band formed in 1984. Their lyrics discussed topics such as unemployment, illegal immigration, the illegal drug trade, the working class and violence (such as sports-related violence known as barra brava). At least one band member was part of the fascist organization Movimiento Nacional Socialista.

== Early 1980s ==
Comando Suicida was a partial continuation of Los Desalmados, a punk rock band formed in 1981, from which came the members Sergio (vocals) and Key (guitar). El Mariskal (who later joined Trixy y los Maniáticos) and Fernán (drums, formerly of the band Alerta Roja) completed the band's lineup. The name Comando Suicida came from a quote by an English soldier describing how he viewed the Argentine Army in the Malvinas Argentinas War in an interview. The name is a homage to the Argentine soldiers who died in the conflict.

In the beginning, Comando Suicida was stylistically similar to the raw punk sound of the Sex Pistols, with nihilistic lyrics, which changed significantly as the band evolved towards a more social message, influenced mainly by bands such as Cockney Rejects, Sham 69, Last Resort, Decibelios from Spain, Cock Sparrer, The 4-Skins and Nabat from Italy.

== 1987-2000 ==
The band's first official EP was released in 1987 by the then young record label Radio Trípoli. At the time, the label was co-owned by Chuchu Fassanelli (one of the members of the band), and Walter Kolm (the band's manager). The Al K.O. EP featured four songs, including a cover of "Chaos" by The 4-Skins. The lineup included Sergio on vocals, Chuchu on drums, El Mariskal on Bass, Tano on guitar, El Gallego on bass and Adrián “Chino” Vera, actually all the guitars were recorded by Juanchi Baleiron on that EP. Vera was later a member of Attaque 77, Conmoción Cerebral, Mal Momento and Katarro Vandáliko. The EP sold out quickly and a second edition was produced in response to the high demand.

In 1988, the band was asked to record two new songs for what would become the first Argentine punk LP, Invasión 88. The compilation record, released by Radio Trípoli, featured many up-and-coming bands, such as Attaque 77 and Flema.

At this time, problems between two of the band's members caused the band to split. They recorded only one song, Qué loca está la hinchada, for the program Equipo desafío in 1995. The song was made popular in the 1970s by La Barra de la Goma (Club San Lorenzo de Almagro). This song was featured three years later on a compilation CD produced by Sick Boy Records, known as Comando Suicida 1982 - 1996. As the name indicates, the album featured songs spanning the band's career up to that point, some of which were taken from demo tapes and recordings of the band's rehearsals. The album included a cover version of the Sex Pistols song No Feelings in Spanish.

== 2000 and later ==
In 2002, Sergio recruited new members to reform the band: Charly and Lute on guitars, Tano on bass, and Tati on drums (later replaced by Nikito). While only Charly remained on guitar, and tension grew between the three remaining members, more new members were brought in: Juan Gonad on bass and Dany on drums. In 2004, the new lineup recorded a CD called Sentimiento Inexplicable at Fuera del Túnel studios. The disc included 10 songs, including one Alerta Roja cover (Juventud Perdida), one cover of a Cockney Rejects song in Spanish (Guerra en la popular), and a newly recorded version of a 1983 song, Desaparecido, dating from the era of Los Desalmados, the band preceding Comando Suicida. The album saw a return to the band's roots in the 1980s, with an updated sound.

== Discography ==
- Al K.O. (1987)
- Oi!, Rare & Exotica - Vol. 1 (1999) (Various Artists)
- Sentimiento Inexplicable (2004)
