= Repo Man (soundtrack) =

Repo Man: Music from the Original Motion Picture

Soundtrack album by Various artists
- Released: 1984
- Recorded: 1980–1984
- Genre: Punk rock; hardcore punk; soundtrack
- Length: 37:20
- Label: MCA
- Producer: Peter McCarthy, Jonathan Wacks

Repo Man is the soundtrack album to the eponymous 1984 film, Repo Man. The soundtrack features songs by punk rock acts such as the Plugz, Black Flag, the Circle Jerks, Suicidal Tendencies, Iggy Pop and others. The film score was created by Tito Larriva, Steven Hufsteter, Charlie Quintana and Tony Marsico of the Plugz. Iggy Pop volunteered to write the title song after his manager viewed a screening of the film.

== Background ==
A website Creative Noise noted the soundtrack as a snapshot of the early-1980s Los Angeles hardcore punk scene of the time. Director Alex Cox wanted the music to serve as a backdrop to the story of the life of the repo men.

== Track listing ==
Side one
No.	Title	Writer(s)	Performer	Length
1.	"Repo Man"	Iggy Pop	Iggy Pop, Steve Jones, Nigel Harrison, Clem Burke	5:12
2.	"TV Party"	Greg Ginn	Black Flag	3:50
3.	"Institutionalized"	Mike Muir, Louiche Mayorga	Suicidal Tendencies	3:49
4.	"Coup d'État"	Keith Morris, Greg Hetson	Circle Jerks	1:59
5.	"El Clavo y la Cruz"	Tito Larriva	The Plugz	2:56

Side two
No.	Title	Writer(s)	Performer	Length
1.	"Pablo Picasso"	Jonathan Richman	Burning Sensations	4:01
2.	"Let's Have a War"	Lee Ving, Philo Cramer	Fear	2:28
3.	"When the Shit Hits the Fan"	Morris, Hetson	Circle Jerks	3:11
4.	"Hombre Secreto (Secret Agent Man)"	P. F. Sloan, Steve Barri	The Plugz	1:46
5.	"Bad Man"	Alexander Schloss; Billy Ferrick; Ron White; Earl Thompson	Juicy Bananas	4:59
6.	"Reel Ten"	Larriva	The Plugz	3:09

== Reception ==
Noel Murray of The Dissolve website in 2013 considered Black Flag's "TV Party", Suicidal Tendencies's "Institutionalized", Circle Jerks' "Coup d'État", and Fear's "Let's Have a War" the highlights of the soundtrack. Stephen Cook of AllMusic rated the soundtrack four and a half stars out of five.

== See also ==
- The Decline of Western Civilization
