= The Little Deaths =

American rock band

- The Little Deaths in 1998, left to right: Scott Bradley, Mikel Delgado, Aaron Detroit, Whitney Skillcorn, and Clay Walsh

Background information
- Origin: San Francisco, California, USA
- Genres: Punk rock, Alternative rock, Queercore
- Years active: 1997–2002
- Labels: Heartcore Records
- Members: Aaron Detroit; Mikel Delgado; Scott Bradley; Clay Walsh
- Past members: Trixie Hahn; Whitney Skillcorn

The Little Deaths was an American rock band formed in San Francisco, California in 1997. The band was associated with the 1990s Queercore movement and became part of the San Francisco Bay-Area's late-1990s musical renaissance which spawned bands like Subtonix, The Phantom Limbs, Erase Errata, The Vanishing, and the 7 Year Bitch offshoot, Clone. The Little Deaths toured and played shows with bands such as The Need, Le Tigre, The Haggard and Imperial Teen extensively until 2000. They released one critically acclaimed album entitled Destination: Sexy on New York-based Queercore label Heartcore Records in 1999. The Little Deaths went through several line-up changes before disbanding in 2002.

Lead singer Aaron Detroit later appeared in the Queer Punk issue of infamous punk publication Maximum RocknRoll. He went on to play synthesizer with the Dame Darcy-fronted band Death By Doll. They released the album Gasoline in 2006. In addition to his continued musical output, in 2006 Detroit became a regular contributor to SuicideGirls.com's Newswire as a music blogger. His contributions include a notable interview with rock singer Marilyn Manson.

Mikel Delgado later joined Whysall Lane in 2001, a group formed by Richard Baluyut, formerly of Versus, which also included Adam Pfahler, formerly of Jawbreaker, and Lorna Lithgow. The group eventually released one split single, A track on a 2004 TeenBeat compilation, and a self-titled album on Blackball Records in 2006. Later in that year Mikel left the band.

Whitney Skillcorn later joined forces with Jody Bleyle of Team Dresch and Tamala Poljak of Longstocking to form the group Infinite Xs. The group released one recording on the Chainsaw label in 2002. She then went on to form Robo Sapien with Chad Byrne in 2002. The duo currently resides in Carrboro, North Carolina where they continue to write and record music from home.

== Discography ==
- Destination: Sexy Album (1999) released by Heartcore Records
