= Philippe Hamilton-Rollings =

Ukrainian footballer

Personal information
- Full name: Philippe Larry Volodymyrovych Hamilton-Rollings
- Date of birth: 22 February 1993 (age 33)
- Place of birth: Kharkiv, Ukraine
- Height: 1.80 m (5 ft 11 in)
- Position: Defender

Team information
- Current team: Real Pharma Odesa
- Number: 22

Youth career
- 2006–2010: Arsenal Kharkiv

Senior career*
Years	Team	Apps	(Gls)
2010	Kharkiv	1	(0)
2011–2013	Helios Kharkiv	16	(0)
2016	Krystal Kherson	5	(0)
2016	Metalist 1925 Kharkiv	8	(0)
2017	Zmiiv	6	(1)
2017	Metalist 1925 Kharkiv	5	(0)
2018	Real Pharma Odesa	11	(0)
2018	Zirka Kropyvnytskyi	4	(0)
2018–	Real Pharma Odesa	0	(0)
- * Club domestic league appearances and goals as of 30 August 2018

Philippe Larry Hamilton-Rollings (Ukrainian: Філіп Ларрі Володимирович Хамільтон-Роллінгс; born 22 February 1993 in Kharkiv, Ukraine) is a professional Ukrainian football defender of Ghanaian descent who plays for Real Pharma Odesa.

== Career ==
Hamilton-Rollings is a product of the FC Arsenal Kharkiv Youth Sportive School System. He spent time as player in the Ukrainian First League and the Ukrainian Second League.
