= Rollin =

Rollin or Rollin' may refer to:

== Music ==
=== Albums ===
- Rollin' (Bay City Rollers album), 1974
- Rollin' (Freddie Hubbard album), 1982
- Rollin' (Texas Hippie Coalition album) or the title song, 2010
- Rollin' (B1A4 EP) or the title song, 2017
- Rollin' (Brave Girls EP) or the title song (see below), 2017
- Rollin', by Ava Leigh, 2008 (unreleased)

=== Songs ===
- "Rollin'" (Brave Girls song), 2017
- "Rollin" (Calvin Harris song), 2017
- "Rollin'" (Limp Bizkit song), 2000
- "Rollin'", by Garth Brooks from Fresh Horses, 1995
- "Rollin'", by Hootie & the Blowfish from Imperfect Circle, 2019
- "Rollin'", by Ish featuring Stef Lang, 2012
- "Rollin", by Jess Glynne from Always In Between, 2018
- "Rollin'", by Kara from Lupin, 2010
- "Rollin'", by Kylie Minogue from Golden, 2018
- "Rollin'", by Lil Wayne from Sorry 4 the Wait, 2011
- "Rollin'", by Little Big Town from The Breaker, 2017
- "Rollin'", by Randy Newman from Good Old Boys, 1974
- "Rollin'", by Twice from Twicetagram, 2017
- "Rollin", by Yeat from 2 Alive (2022)
- "Rollin' (The Ballad of Big & Rich)", by Big & Rich from Horse of a Different Color, 2004

== Other uses ==
- Rollin (name)
- Rollin Township, Michigan, United States
- Rollin (video game), a 1995 video game for MS-DOS created by Ticsoft
- Rollin Motors, a 1920s American car brand founded by Rollin White; see White Motor Company

== See also ==
- Rollin film, a film of liquid helium
- Rolling (disambiguation)
