= Los Crudos =

American hardcore punk band

- Los Crudos performing live in 1994

Background information
- Origin: Pilsen, Chicago, Illinois, U.S.
- Genre: Hardcore punk
- Years active: 1991–1998; 2006; 2008–2009; 2012–present
- Labels: Lengua Armada; Ebullition
- Spinoffs: Limp Wrist
- Members: Martin Sorrondeguy; José Casas; Juan Jimenez; Ebro Virumbrales
- Past members: Oscar Chávez; Joel Martinez; Bryan; Lenin; Mando
- Website: loscrudoschicago.bandcamp.com

Los Crudos is an American hardcore punk band from Chicago, Illinois, formed in 1991. Consisting of all Latino members, the band paved the way for later Spanish-speaking punk bands in the United States by helping to increase the presence of Latinos in the country's predominantly white punk subculture. They have been described as "one of '90s punk's truly great bands" and "one of the greatest hardcore bands...ever." Additionally, Alan O'Connor has described them as "very popular in both the 'crusty' and emo/straight edge scenes in North America."

== History ==
Los Crudos formed in the early 1990s by vocalist Martin Sorrondeguy and guitarist José Casas, both of whom remained the band's only constant members throughout changing rhythm sections. Their lyrics were almost always sung in Spanish, with the song "We're That Spic Band" (written in response to an audience member calling them a "spic band") being the sole exception. Lyrically, Los Crudos were explicitly political, addressing many social issues such as class, police brutality, homophobia, and California ballot propositions directed against immigrants. At live concerts, Sorrondeguy would often speak at length between songs about their meanings, partly as a way of getting around the language barrier, though audiences were not always happy about this. Their music was loud, fast, and energetic with songs built around three chords or fewer. "We're That Spic Band" and "Asesinos" (a song about "the disappearances of radical youth during military dictatorships in Latin America") have both been described as their most well-known songs.

The band's first live performances happened in Pilsen, the Latino neighborhood in Chicago where the band members lived at the time, as well as where many of their lyrics were first sung. Sorrondeguy has said that, "One of the main reasons for singing in Spanish was to communicate directly with kids in our neighborhood." In Pilsen, the band also worked closely with community agencies such as Project Vida, an AIDS prevention organization, and Project Hablo, a domestic violence support group.

Los Crudos incorporated DIY ethics into every aspect of the band's existence, including promoting and booking shows, recording music, touring, and silk-screening t-shirts. Aditionally, they turned down record deals from major labels and chose to adhere from performing at very large theaters or clubs. During their initial tenure, they toured Mexico, South America, Europe, and Japan, as well as performing throughout the United States many times. The band's recordings were released on independent record labels such as Ebullition Records, and Sorrondeguy's own label, Lengua Armada Discos. Their final rhythm section included bassist Juan Jimenez and drummer Ebro Virumbrales (who was also a concurrent member of Charles Bronson and MK-Ultra).

=== Breakup and recent activity ===
In October 1998, Los Crudos performed their last shows in Pilsen, the neighborhood where the band began. After their breakup, members went on to perform in many other punk related acts. Sorrondeguy formed the queercore band Limp Wrist in 1998, and released a documentary about Chicano and Latino punk culture, titled Beyond The Screams: A U.S. Latino Hardcore Punk Documentary, in 1999. He has also since been a member in the bands Harto and Tragatelo. Guitarist José Casas subsequently joined the Chicago-based punk band I Attack afterwards. Drummer Ebro Virumbrales became the vocalist for Chicago-based band Punch in the Face.

=== Reunions ===
In June 2006, Los Crudos played an unannounced reunion show at Southkore, the United States' first and largest Latino punk festival, in Chicago's Little Village. The festival, which also featured other bands such as Tropiezo and La Armada, was attended by hundreds of fans.

In 2008, the band reformed for two reunion shows at the Chaos in Tejas festival in Austin, Texas, and Los Angeles, California. In 2016, they performed shows throughout the Midwest and readied for a European tour in the United Kingdom as well as numerous Scandinavian cities.

== Band members ==
=== Current lineup ===
- Martin Sorrondeguy – vocals (1991–1998, 2006, 2008–2009, 2013-present)
- José Casas – guitar (1991–1998, 2006, 2008–2009, 2013-present)
- Juan Jimenez – bass (1997–1998, 2006, 2008-2009, 2013-present)
- Ebro Virumbrales – drums (1995-1998, 2006, 2008-2009, 2013-present)

=== Past members ===
- Oscar Chávez – bass (1991–1993)
- Lenin – bass (1993–1996)
- Mando – bass (played bass on split with MK-Ultra)
- Joel Martinez – drums (1991–1995)
- Bryan – drums (filled in for 1994 tour)

== Discography ==
=== Studio albums ===
- Viviendo Asperamente = Roughly Living - split w/ Spitboy (1995, Ebullition)
- Canciones Para Liberar Nuestras Fronteras (1996, Lengua Armada)
- 1991–1995 Los Primeros Gritos (1997, Lengua Armada)
- Los Crudos / Reversal of Man (2001, Ebullition) (Note: This was supposed to be a repress of the Los Crudos/Spitboy split LP, but the pressing plant accidentally pressed 1000 copies of the Los Crudos side of the split with the A-Side of the Reversal of Man "This Is Medicine" LP. Rather than destroy accidental pressing, the copies were sold and the proceeds were donated to a rape crisis center.)

=== EPs and splits ===
- La Rabia Nubla Nuestros Ojos… (1993, Lengua Armada)
- Nunca Nada Cambia... A Menos Que Lo Hagamos Cambiar (split with Huasipungo) (1993, Lengua Armada)
- Las Injusticias Caen Como Pesadillas (1994, Lengua Armada)
- Western Shoshone Defense Project (split with Manumission) (1994, Lengua Armada)
- Los Crudos/MK- Ultra (2004, Lengua Armada)

=== Compilations ===
- In The Spirit Of Total Resistance (1992, Profane Existence) (Note: "A benefit release for the Mohawk nation of Kanesatake, in Quebec, who came under persecution in 1990.")
- Chicago Hardcore Compilation (1993, C.S. Productions)
- Achtung Chicago Zwei! (1993, Underdog)
- A History Of Compassion and Justice? (1994, Lengua Armada) (Note: A benefit for a mural in Chicago.)
- En Vivo En Pantitlán (1994, Puro Pinche Ruido)
- Stealing the Pocket Compilation (1995, Positively Punk)
- CIA Via UFO TO Mercury (1995, self-released)
- Books To Prisoners (1996, Young Heirs Project)
- Bllleeeeaaauuurrrrgghhh! - A Music War (1998, Slap-a-Ham)
- Libérame (1998, El Grito)
- Cry Now, Cry Later Volumes 3 & 4 (1998, Pessimiser)
- Reality Part 3 (1999, Deep Six)
- Iron Columns (1999, Mind Control)
- America Is Bella…Para Vivir Resistiendo!! (1999, Cryptas)
- Chicago's On Fire Again (2001, Lengua Armada)
- Doble LP Discografía (2015, Maximumrocknroll)

== See also ==
- Limp Wrist
- Chicano punk
- Latino punk
- List of Chicago hardcore punk bands
