= Martin Sorrondeguy =

American vocalist

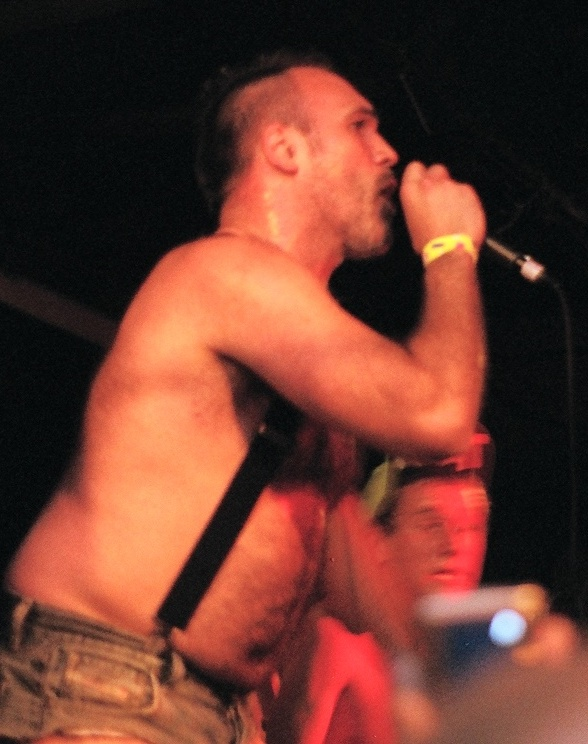
- Sorrondeguy performing with Limp Wrist

Background information
- Genres: Hardcore punk
- Instrument: Vocals
- Years active: 1985–present
- Label: Lengua Armada Discos

Martin Sorrondeguy (born December 3, 1967) is the singer of American hardcore punk bands Los Crudos and Limp Wrist, the founder of the DIY record label Lengua Armada Discos, and a prominent figure in both the straight edge scene and the queercore scene. He currently does vocals in the band Canal Irreal.

== Biography ==
Martin Sorrondeguy was born in Montevideo, Uruguay, and grew up in Chicago, United States. He sang about many issues facing Spanish speaking minorities in the U.S. as the vocalist for Los Crudos. The band recorded in both Spanish and English, releasing many recordings, and toured in South America and Mexico, as well as the U.S. and Canada. Sorrondeguy created the independent record label Lengua Armada Discos to release his bands records. While in Los Crudos, Sorrondeguy began making his documentary film Beyond The Screams: A U.S. Latino Hardcore Punk Documentary. The film was released in 2004.

It was during the time he was vocalist for Los Crudos that Sorrondeguy made his sexuality public and began to speak out about it. In 1997, he appeared in Scott Treleaven's documentary film Queercore: A Punk-U-Mentary and spoke about being gay in the hardcore punk scene. In the mid 1990s, Sorrondeguy put together a new band called Limp Wrist, a straight edge queercore band. In 2001, he was featured in the Punk Planet publication We Owe You Nothing. In 2002, he appeared in the "Queer Punk" issue of the long running San Francisco-based punk zine Maximum Rock n Roll speaking with musicians such as Aaron Detroit of The Little Deaths, Cookie Tuff of Subtonix and members of Sta-Prest. In 2006, Limp Wrist toured the U.S. and began recording for a new album, to be released in 2007.

Since the early 2000s, Sorrondeguy has been very active in solo and group photo exhibitions of his photography, which has also been regularly documented in his semi-regular 'zine, Susto. Sorrondeguy has been an occasional guest lecturer on his experiences in Canada, Brazil, Australia and the U.S. Los Crudos continues to tour, embarking on U.S. and Scandinavian dates in 2016.

Sorrondeguy was interviewed about his life by Nicholas De Genova for Episode 2 of the Metropolis Rising podcast.

== Discography ==
for discographies see:

- Los Crudos
- Limp Wrist

== Films ==
- Queercore: A Punk-U-Mentary, directed by Scott Treleaven (1997)
- Beyond the Screams: A U.S. Latino Hardcore Punk Documentary directed by Martin Sorrondeguy (1999)
