= Tarantism (album) =

Studio album by Tito & Tarantula
- Released: 1997
- Recorded: NRG, Coney Island, Jackson Browne's, Tito's, Sonora, One On One
- Genres: Chicano rock, Blues rock, Latin rock, Latin alternative, stoner rock
- Length: 45:36
- Label: Cockroach Records
- Producers: Tito Larriva; Robert Rodriguez

Tito & Tarantula chronology
Tarantism (1997)	Hungry Sally & Other Killer Lullabies (1999)

Tarantism is the debut album by Los Angeles rock band Tito & Tarantula, released in 1997. The album was released following the band's growing popularity after having their songs featured on the soundtracks for the Robert Rodriguez films From Dusk Till Dawn and Desperado, who also co-produced the album. Several members of the band were also featured in From Dusk Till Dawn, playing as the band in the "Titty Twister" bar, performing "After Dark" and "Angry Cockroaches (Cucarachas Enojadas)". Music videos were made for "After Dark" and "Back to the House (That Love Built)", using clips from the films mixed with footage of the band performing them.

"After Dark" and "Back to the House (That Love Built)" were co-written by rhythm guitarist/lead vocalist Tito Larriva's former bandmates in the Cruzados. "Back to the House (That Love Built)" was written by Larriva with former bassist Tony Marsico, along with Charlie Midnight and Marsico's wife, Valerie Marsico. "After Dark" was written by Larriva and former lead guitarist Steven Hufsteter while they were still in the Cruzados. Hufsteter later joined Tito & Tarantula as a second lead guitarist in 2002, and is currently still in the band. The album also features guest appearances by Marsico and former Cruzados drummer Chalo Quintana.

== Track listing ==
All tracks are written by Peter Atanasoff and Tito Larriva, except where noted.

No.	Title	Writer(s)	Length
1.	"After Dark"	Steven Hufsteter, Larriva	3:44
2.	"Smiling Karen"		3:58
3.	"Slippin' and Slidin'"	Larriva, Danny Kortchmar, Waddy Wachtel	3:43
4.	"Strange Face (of Love)"	Larriva	5:38
5.	"Angry Cockroaches (Cucarachas Enojadas)"		4:39
6.	"Back to the House (That Love Built)"	Larriva, Tony Marsico, Valerie Marsico, Charlie Midnight	4:32
7.	"Jupiter"		6:08
8.	"Sweet Cycle (of Life)"		4:58
9.	"Flying in My Sleep"		3:58
10.	"Killing Just for Fun"		4:38
Total length:			45:36

== Personnel ==
- Peter Atanasoff – lead guitar, backing vocals
- Tito Larriva – rhythm guitar, lead vocals
- Jennifer Condos – bass, backing vocals
- Lyn Bertles – violin, mandolin, recorder, harmonica, backing vocals
- Nick Vincent – drums, percussion, backing vocals

=== Additional personnel ===
- Mark Goldenberg on "After Dark" and "Angry Cockroaches (Cucarachas Enojadas)"
- Debra Dobkin on "Jupiter" and "Killing Just for Fun"
- Charlie Midnight on "Slippin' and Slidin'"
- Carlos Quiaco on "Slippin' and Slidin'"
- Mike Thompson on "Strange Face (of Love)"
- Chalo Quintana on "Strange Face (of Love)" and "Back to the House (That Love Built)"
- Tony Marsico on "Strange Face (of Love)" and "Back to the House (That Love Built)"
- Robert Rodriguez on "Angry Cockroaches (Cucarachas Enojadas)"
- Waddy Wachtel on "Slippin' and Slidin'"
- Adrian Esparza on "Back to the House (That Love Built)"

=== Production ===
- Brad Gilderman – mixing on "Smiling Karen", "Jupiter", "Sweet Cycle (of Life)", "Flying in My Sleep" and "Killing Just for Fun", engineer on "Smiling Karen", "Slippin' and Slidin'", "Jupiter", "Flying in My Sleep" and "Killing Just for Fun"
- Dave Shiffman – mixing on "Slippin' and Slidin'"
- Thom Panunzio – mixing on "Back to the House (That Love Built)"
- Joel Soyfer – mixing on "After Dark", engineer on "Slippin' and Slidin'" and "Back to the House (That Love Built)"
- David Tickle – mixing on "Strange Face (of Love)", engineer on "Strange Face (of Love)"
- Julian Mack – mixing on "Angry Cockroaches (Cucarachas Enojadas)", engineer on "Angry Cockroaches (Cucarachas Enojadas)"
- Mark Goldenberg – engineer on "After Dark" and "Angry Cockroaches (Cucarachas Enojadas)"
- Lisa Lewis – assistant engineer
- Jay Baumgardner – assistant engineer
- Paul B. – assistant engineer
- Jamie Seyberth – assistant engineer
- Ryan Arnold – assistant engineer
- Laurent – assistant engineer

== Sales ==
Sales for Tarantism
Region	Sales
Germany	70,000
