= Desperado: The Soundtrack =

Soundtrack album by Various artists
- Released: August 15, 1995
- Genres: Chicano rock; Ranchera; Hard rock
- Length: 59:33
- Languages: English; Spanish
- Labels: Epic; Sony

Los Lobos chronology
Music for Papa's Dream (1995)	Desperado (1995)	Colossal Head (1996)

Professional ratings
Review scores
Source	Rating
Allmusic	3/5 stars

Desperado: The Soundtrack is the film score to Robert Rodriguez's Desperado. It was written and performed by the Los Angeles rock bands Los Lobos and Tito & Tarantula, performing traditional Ranchera and Chicano rock music. Other artists on the soundtrack album include Dire Straits, Link Wray, Latin Playboys, and Carlos Santana. Musician Tito Larriva has a small role in the film, and his band, Tito & Tarantula, contributed to the soundtrack as well.

The album track "Mariachi Suite" by Los Lobos was awarded a Grammy for Best Pop Instrumental Performance at the 1995 Grammy Awards.

== Track listing ==
No.	Title	Writer(s)	Artist	Length
1.	"Canción del Mariachi ("Morena de Mi Corazón")"	Cesar Rosas	Los Lobos and Antonio Banderas	2:06
2.	"Six Blade Knife (Note: Features dialogue "There He Was" by Steve Buscemi)"	Mark Knopfler	Dire Straits	4:34
3.	"Jack the Ripper (Note: Features dialogue "The Bartender Never Gets Killed" by Cheech Marin)"	Link Wray; Milt Grant	Link Wray & His Ray Men	2:31
4.	"Manifold de Amour"	David Hidalgo; Louie Pérez	Latin Playboys	2:03
5.	"Forever Night Shade Mary"	Hidalgo; Pérez	Latin Playboys	3:00
6.	"Pass the Hatchet"	Earl Stanley Oropeza; Ray Theriot; Roger Leon Jr.	Roger & the Gypsies	3:00
7.	"Bar Fight (Note: Features dialogue "Is There Something in the Guitar Case?" by Antonio Banderas and Cheech Marin)"	Los Lobos	Los Lobos	1:54
8.	"Strange Face of Love (Note: Features dialogue "But You Had to Do It the Hard Way" by Antonio Banderas)"	Tito Larriva	Tito & Tarantula	5:51
9.	"Bucho's Gracias / Navajas Attacks (Note: Features dialogue "I Use It to Pick Up Girls" by Antonio Banderas and Salma Hayek)"	Los Lobos	Los Lobos	3:56
10.	"Bulletproof (Note: Features dialogue "Forgive Me, Father" by Antonio Banderas and Steve Buscemi)"	Los Lobos	Los Lobos	1:42
11.	"Bella"	Carlos Santana; Chester Thompson; Sterling Crew	Carlos Santana	4:29
12.	"Quédate Aquí"	Mildred Villafañe	Salma Hayek	2:05
13.	"Rooftop Action (Note: Features dialogue "You Look Great" by Antonio Banderas and Salma Hayek)"	Los Lobos	Los Lobos	1:36
14.	"Phone Call (Note: Features dialogue "Easier to Destroy Than to Create" by Antonio Banderas)"	Los Lobos	Los Lobos	2:16
15.	"White Train (Showdown) (Note: Features dialogue "Bring Your Guitars" by Antonio Banderas)"	Larriva	Tito & Tarantula	5:57
16.	"Back to the House That Love Built (Note: Features dialogue "Did I Thank You?" by Antonio Banderas and Salma Hayek)"	Larriva	Tito & Tarantula	4:41
17.	"Let Love Reign"	Los Lobos	Los Lobos	3:22
18.	"Mariachi Suite"	Los Lobos	Los Lobos	4:22
Total length:				59:33

== Personnel ==
- Tom Baker – mastering
- Antonio Banderas – speech
- Steve Berlin – mixing
- Richard Bosworth – engineer, mixing engineer
- Steve Buscemi – speech
- Bill Jackson – engineer, mixing
- Tito Larriva – producer
- Los Lobos – producer
- Cheech Marin – speech
- Charlie Midnight – producer
- Thom Panunzio – mixing
- Karyn Rachtman – executive producer
- Robert Rodriguez – executive producer
- Cesar Rosas – engineer
- Carlos Santana – performer
- Quentin Tarantino – speech
- David Tickle – mixing
- Andy Kravitz -Engineer

== Charts ==
Chart (1996)	Peak position
Hungarian Albums (MAHASZ)	21
