= Tito & Tarantula =

American rock band

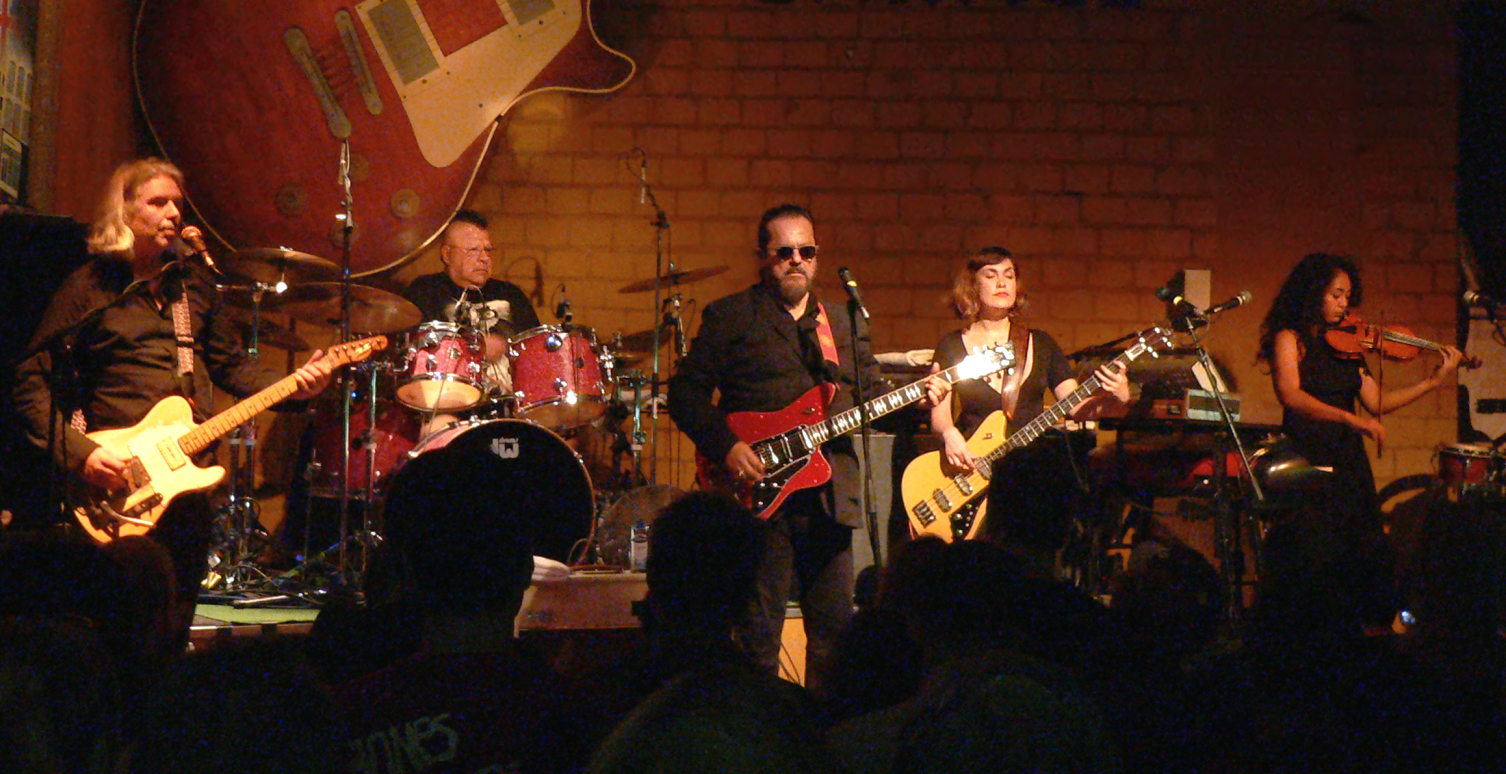
- Tito & Tarantula performing 2016. L-R: Marcus Praed, Johnny "Vatos" Hernandez, Tito Larriva, Lolita Carroll Larriva, Allysa Grace

Background information
- Origin: Los Angeles, California, U.S.
- Genres: Chicano rock; blues rock; Latin rock; Latin alternative; hard rock; stoner rock
- Years active: 1992–present
- Members: Tito Larriva; Allysa Grace; Lolita Carroll; Peter Atanasoff; Johnny "Vatos" Hernandez; Marcus Praed
- Past members: Jennifer Condos; Lyn Bertles; Andrea Figueroa; Johnny "Vatos" Hernandez; Nick Vincent; Adrian Esparza; Richard Edson; Tony Marsico; Debra Dobkin; Petra Haden; Io Perry; Abbie Travis; Achim Farber; Dominique Davalos; Rafael Gayol; Steven Hufsteter; Alfredo Ortiz; Caroline "Lucy LaLoca" Rippy; Andrea Figueroa; Marcus Praed; Bobby Dean Higgins
- Website: titoandtarantula.com

Tito & Tarantula is an American chicano rock/blues rock band formed in Hollywood, California, in 1992 by singer/songwriter/guitarist Tito Larriva.

The band is best known for its songs "After Dark", "Back to the House That Love Built", "Strange Face of Love" and "Angry Cockroaches", as well as for its role in Robert Rodriguez's film From Dusk till Dawn as the band performing at the "Titty Twister" nightclub. "After Dark" was the track played during Salma Hayek's iconic exotic dance scene in that film, and later became the theme for From Dusk till Dawn: The Series.

== History ==
=== Pre-Tarantula ===
Tito Larriva was born in Ciudad Juárez, Mexico, but spent his early years living outside Fairbanks, Alaska; his family later relocated to El Paso, Texas, where he studied violin and flute as a member of his school orchestra. After high school he flirted with attending Yale University before landing in Los Angeles, California in the mid-1970s. He began his music career by playing in some of the first Latino punk bands such as The Impalas, The Flesh Eaters, and, most notably, The Plugz. Larriva released several albums with the Plugz before the group disbanded in 1984. Following disbandment, Larriva teamed up with former Plugz bandmates Charlie Quintana and Tony Marsico to form the Cruzados. With the Cruzados, Larriva's music began to move in a different direction, straying from his typical punk rock to a bluesier 1980s rock sound. The band was critically acclaimed and opened for big acts like INXS and Fleetwood Mac. They released a self-titled album in 1985, followed by After Dark in 1987, but disbanded in 1988. The Cruzados also performed the song "Don't Throw Stones" at the beginning of the 1989 movie Roadhouse.

=== Early years: Desperado and From Dusk till Dawn ===
From there, Larriva continued writing film music, and also turned to acting. Starting in 1992, he and guitarist Peter Atanasoff celebrated with various friends at live weekly jam sessions in the cafes and clubs of Los Angeles, at big, spontaneous parties. The band at that time were simply known as "Tito & Friends." As Tito explained in an interview, their old friend Charlie Midnight stated that the band needed a name, and suggested Tito & Tarantula. The band agreed and it stuck.

By 1995, officially called Tito & Tarantula, the band had a stable lineup of Larriva (lead vocals, rhythm guitar), Atanasoff (lead guitar), Jennifer Condos (bass), Lyn Bertles (violin, mandolin, recorder, harmonica), and Nick Vincent (drums, percussion). It was with this lineup that they recorded the songs "Back to the House That Love Built", "Strange Face of Love", and "White Train", which made their debut in Robert Rodriguez' film Desperado, which featured Larriva in a fairly minor but important role. The three songs appear on the film's soundtrack. The next year, the band appeared in Rodriguez' From Dusk till Dawn as house band of the "Titty Twister" (though this band only consisted of Larriva, Atanasoff, and future drummer Johnny "Vatos" Hernandez). They also recorded three songs for the film: "After Dark", "Angry Cockroaches", and "Opening Boxes" (the last of which did not appear on the soundtrack album). "After Dark" would also play in Spanish during a recreation of Salma Hayek's dance shown in From Dusk till Dawn: The Series. The song is also the theme song of the series.

Tito had met Rodriguez when filming Desperado. During the mixing of the film, Tito was playing a previously written song, that happened to be about vampires, which caught the ear of Rodriguez. Rodriguez mentioned that his next film was about vampires, and asked if he could videotape the song acoustically. One week later, Tito was informed that he and the band had now been written into the upcoming film Dusk Before Dawn, primarily to have actress Salma Hayek dance to the previously heard song in a scene.

Tito himself had scored several films previously, including a couple of films in Germany, and Just a Little Harmless Sex – in which he, along with Tarantula, also acted in, as "Chuey & His Spatular". With his earlier band, The Plugz, he scored the cult hit film Repo Man.

=== Tarantism ===
"At some point, more and more people came to see us", says Larriva, "After we did Desperado and From Dusk till Dawn, it was clear that something big was happening with us." So in 1997, Tito & Tarantula made its long-awaited album debut, Tarantism. The album featured four of their six previously released songs ("After Dark", "Strange Face of Love", "Angry Cockroaches", and "Back to the House that Love Built"), and six new songs. It also featured guest-appearances by Larriva's former Plugz and Cruzados bandmates Charlie Quintana and Tony Marsico. It was very well received by both fans and critics alike. The band spent much of 1997 and 1998 touring behind the record. In late 1997, following the release of Tarantism, the band recruited percussionist Johnny "Vatos" Hernandez, best known for his work with Oingo Boingo.

=== Hungry Sally & Other Killer Lullabies ===
In late 1998, Vincent and Bertles, married in 1994, were expecting their second child, and chose to leave the band. Following their departure, Vatos took over on drums, Petra Haden was recruited to replace Bertles, and Bobby Dean Higgins joined on backing vocals. This new lineup set to work on a new album, writing and recording new songs, but saw the departure of Haden before the album was released. The finished album, Hungry Sally & Other Killer Lullabies, was released in 1999. It was well-received, but was considered a disappointment in comparison to Tarantism. After the release of Hungry Sally, the band recruited Andrea Figueroa to replace Haden as violinist, mandolinist, flutist, and guitarist.

=== Little Bitch ===
Following the release of Hungry Sally, Condos left the band for "private reasons". The four remaining members began to work on another album, Little Bitch, but saw the departure of Figueroa from the band before the album's release in 2000. Little Bitch did not sell well, and featured a fair amount of musical experimentation that did not please fans. It did, however, feature co-songwriting credits from Larriva's former Cruzados bandmate Steven Hufsteter. During this time, the movie, From Dusk Till Dawn 3: The Hangman's Daughter was released, the third installment of the From Dusk Till Dawn trilogy, the first of which featured musical contributions and guest roles by the band. The third movie featured the band's song "Smiling Karen" in the closing credits.

=== Andalucia ===
After the release of the album, the band began to hire replacements for their departed bandmates. Firstly, they hired two musicians who had assisted them on Little Bitch: Marcus Praed (who had played bass and additional guitar on the album, but was hired as a pianist) and Steven Hufsteter (who joined as a second lead guitarist). Additionally, they hired bassist Io Perry as a replacement for Condos. This lineup spent 2001 and some of 2002 touring, then went back to the studio to record Andalucia, which was released in 2002. The album did not sell as well as either of the first two, but got better reception than Little Bitch. The band spent the next few years touring the album. They also filmed a music video for the song "California Girl". However, upon seeing how bad the footage of the video was, Perry threw up, Larriva threatened to quit, and Atanasoff was not seen around for days. So, to compensate, Larriva made his own video for the song using the eight dollars he had in his pocket.

=== Mid-2000s ===
Since the release of Andalucia, Tito & Tarantula have made numerous personnel changes, starting with the departure of drummer Johnny "Vatos" Hernandez. Achim Farber was hired in his place, but left the band later on as well. One of the most notable changes, however, was the loss of the band's valuable founding member Peter Atanasoff. Little is known about his departure, but on the band's Myspace blog, it says, "...So if ever you find yourself in Switzerland you want to make your way to the Moonwalker and say hello to Peter..." Io Perry quit the band to pursue a solo career, but stayed in business with Larriva by having him produce her first solo album. Along with Atanasoff, Perry, and Hernandez, the band lost multi-instrumentalist Marcus Praed, eventually leaving Larriva and Steven Hufsteter as the only remaining members who had played on the last album. Dominique Davalos (who had played bass on Little Bitch) took over on bass and Rafael Gayol took over on drums. With this new "fab four" incarnation, they toured Europe thoroughly. At some point in mid-2007, Davalos left the band, and was replaced by Caroline "Lucy LaLoca" Rippy. With her, the band has continued to tour its usual areas in western Europe.

In December 2007, the band's song "Angry Cockroaches (Cucarachas Enojadas)" has been featured in previews for the movie Fred Claus. Other films Tito & Tarantula have contributed music to include Somebody to Love, Dream with the Fishes, and Just a Little Harmless Sex.

=== Back into the Darkness and further releases ===
In late 2006, the band promised an album out in early 2007 on their Myspace blog. In early 2008, the band finally announced the approaching arrival of their next album, titled Back into the Darkness. The album was released on April 18, 2008.

A remastered edition of the band's debut album was issued in 2015, which contained two additional tracks ("Torquay" and "White Train"). Lost Tarantism, a collection of unreleased songs from the Tarantism sessions, also arrived that year. The band's latest album, 8 Arms to Hold You, was released in 2019.

== Style ==
Many critics and fans note Tito & Tarantula for their unusual musical style. Larriva's soft and clear but easily intensified voice appears throughout their career, as does Atanasoff's unique guitar-playing, which is said to "target a certain sound over skill". In addition to this, there are other uncommon elements in each of their albums. On Tarantism, Atanasoff sports a metal-resembling guitar sound on tracks like "Strange Face of Love", "Angry Cockroaches", and "Smiling Karen", which when blended with Nick Vincent's very blues-driven drumming and Lyn Bertles's provision of violin, mandolin and recorder, results in a sound like nothing else. It was also on this album that the majority of the songs started out mysterious sounding, but slowly built up, and by the end sounded extremely intense.

On Hungry Sally & Other Killer Lullabies, Tarantula continued to play songs that started out light and built up as they progressed, particularly "Hungry Sally" and "Bleeding Roses". This time, however, Atanasoff was trying out with a lighter lead guitar sound, and Johnny "Vatos" Hernandez was playing drums, resulting in a different and more prominent drum sound. Once again, though, instruments uncommon to the rock genre such as violin, mandolin, and recorder were featured, once more blending all these elements into something entirely new.

Little Bitch is considered to be Tarantula's most experimental album. It was different from the past two albums in many ways: it featured a large amount of synthesizers, numerous female backing vocalists, and several entirely-acoustic tracks. Larriva also experimented with his vocals on this album, as can be heard in the falsetto singing in "Forever Forgotten and Unforgiven" and the screaming in "Crack in the World". Also, surprisingly, the song "Super Vita Jane" featured a rap at the end, unlike anything they had ever done before. Songs like "Everybody Needs" were very reminiscent of the '80s, even though the album was released more than a decade later.

On Andalucia, the band revisited the sort of music they had played on Hungry Sally & Other Killer Lullabies. A few of the tracks featured keyboards, which weren't too common of an instrument in their music before, but had to be incorporated so that their keyboardist, Marcus Praed, would have a contribution to the songs. Like on Little Bitch, the album featured female backing vocals, but this time they were all contributed by Io Perry. Overall, the album was general rock, but also featured several acoustic power ballads, such as "You're the One I Love", "California Girl", "Bullets from a Gun", "Make Me", and "Mexican Sky".

== Band members ==
Current members

- Tito Larriva – lead vocals, rhythm guitar (1992–present)
- Jeff Herring – lead guitar, backing vocals (2011–present)
- Lolita Carroll – bass, backing vocals (2013–present)
- Victor Ziolkowski – drums (2011–present)

Former members

- Peter Atanasoff – lead guitar, backing vocals (1992–2006)
- Jennifer Condos – bass, backing vocals (1993–1999)
- Lyn Bertles – violin, mandolin, recorder, harmonica, guitar, backing vocals (1993–1998)
- Andrea Figueroa – violin, mandolin, flute, guitar, backing vocals (1999–2000)
- Marcus Praed – piano, backing vocals, bass, guitar (2000–200?)
- Johnny "Vatos" Hernandez – percussion, drums, backing vocals (1997–2001)
- Nick Vincent – drums, percussion, backing vocals (1992–1998)
- Adrian Esparza – guitar, vocals (1992)
- Richard Edson – percussion (1992–1994)
- Tony Marsico – bass (1992)
- Debra Dobkin – percussion (1995–1997)
- Petra Haden – violin, mandolin, recorder, harmonica, guitar (1998)
- Bobby Dean Higgins – backing vocals (1998–1999)
- Io Perry – bass, backing vocals (200?–200?)
- Abbie Travis – bass (200?–200?)
- Achim Farber – drums (200?–200?)
- Dominique Davalos – bass, backing vocals (200?–2007)
- Rafael Gayol – drums (200?–200?)
- Steven Hufsteter – lead guitar, backing vocals (2002–2011)
- Alfredo Ortiz – drums (2005, 2008–2011)
- Caroline "Lucy LaLoca" Rippy – bass, backing vocals (2007–2013)
- Sammi Bishop – drums (2012 – 201?)

== Discography ==
- Tarantism (1997)
- Hungry Sally & Other Killer Lullabies (1999)
- Little Bitch (2000)
- Andalucia (2002)
- Back into the Darkness (2008)
- Lost Tarantism (2015)
- 8 Arms to Hold You (2019)
- !Brincamos! (2025)

== Music videos ==
- "Back to the House that Love Built" – Desperado soundtrack (1995)
- "After Dark" – Tarantism (1997)
- "Slow Dream" – Hungry Sally & Other Killer Lullabies (1999)
- "Forever Forgotten & Unforgiven" – Little Bitch (2000)
- "California Girl" – Andalucia (2002)
- "Texas Roadhouse Live presents Tito and Tarantula live at the Continental Club" (2009)
