= Little Bitch =

Studio album by Tito & Tarantula
- Released: 2000
- Recorded: The Cemetery in Glendale, California
- Genres: Rock, Industrial rock
- Labels: Cockroach Records; BMG
- Producer: Tito Larriva

Tito & Tarantula chronology
Hungry Sally & Other Killer Lullabies (1999)	Little Bitch (2000)	Andalucia (2002)

Little Bitch is the third album by Tito & Tarantula, released in 2000. It is the band's first album not to feature bassist Jennifer Condos, and showed a major departure from their former style. Instead, they now incorporated the use of synthesizer Moog pedals, giving the music a much stronger pop-rock sound. In addition, they recruited the assistance of several female backing vocalists on most songs, instead of relying on the other band members to back up Tito Larriva's vocals. This musical element is something the band also featured on their next album, 2002's Andalucia, which featured bassist Io Perry singing backing vocals on almost every song. The rest of the new elements featured on Little Bitch were mostly abandoned on Andalucia, which returned a sound more similar to that featured on the band's second album, 1999's Hungry Sally & Other Killer Lullabies.

The album also contained songs written by new songwriters. Charlie Midnight, who had co-written Tito & Tarantula's 1995 hit song "Back to the House (That Love Built)", co-wrote the music for "Everybody Needs". Larriva's former Cruzados bandmate, Steven Hufsteter, co-wrote "Crime & Shame", "World at My Feet" and "Super Vita Jane"; and ended up joining the band as a second lead guitarist. The music for "Dead Person" was co-written by Dominique Davalos, who later became the band's bassist in 2005, and played on the album as a session musician, as the band chose not to hire a replacement for Condos to play on the album.

== Track listing ==
All music is composed by Tito Larriva, except where noted.

No.	Title	Lyrics	Music	Length
1.	"Everybody Needs"	Peter Atanasoff, Tito Larriva, Charlie Midnight	Larriva, Midnight	5:23
2.	"Forever Forgotten & Unforgiven"	Atanasoff, Larriva, Bernie Larsen		5:26
3.	"Crack in the World"	Larriva	John Paragon	3:26
4.	"Goodbye Sadie"	Atanasoff, Larriva, Bron Tieman		4:46
5.	"Lady Don't Leave"	Steven Hufsteter, Larriva	Hufsteter, Larriva	3:52
6.	"Lonely Sweet Marie"	Atanasoff, Larriva		3:20
7.	"Crime & Shame"	Hufsteter, Larriva	Hufsteter, Larriva	3:08
8.	"Bitch"	Atanasoff, Larriva, Tieman	Atanasoff, Larriva, Tieman	3:08
9.	"World at My Feet"	Hufsteter, Larriva	Hufsteter, Larriva	4:23
10.	"Super Vita Jane"	Hufsteter, Larriva	Larriva	3:37
11.	"Dead Person"	Atanasoff, Larriva, Domonique Davalos		3:56
12.	"Silent Train"	Larriva		4:21
13.	"Regresare" (Based on the song "Mexico" by Larriva)	Larriva		3:14

== Personnel ==
- Peter Atanasoff – lead guitar, backing vocals
- Tito Larriva – rhythm guitar, lead vocals
- Johnny "Vatos" Hernandez – drums, percussion, backing vocals

=== Additional personnel ===
- Dominique Davalos – bass, Moog pedals, backing vocals
- Andrea Figueroa – violin, mandolin, additional guitar, backing vocals
- Bucka Allen – B3, wurlitzer, accordion
- John Avila – bass, moog pedals
- Marcus Praed – bass, additional guitar, backing vocals, programming, mixing
- Annette Niermann – backing vocals
- Janet Carroll – backing vocals
- Bridgette Feltus – backing vocals
- Bron Tieman – mini-moog, programming
- Sahil Gupta – the king of the "little bitch" colony located on the 13th floor
- Rachel Holt – wishes she were cool enough to be a little bitch, yet she has been relegated to serve the king of the 13th floor; a.k.a. now considered: a "small bitch"
- Weston Gaddy – a.k.a. song #8 is about him; vocal surgery will however banish him from the band

=== Production ===
- André Recke – executive producer, manager
- Michael Schwabe – mastering
- Mark Howard – co-producer, engineer
- Flo Beler – assistant engineer
- Guido Preus – assistant engineer
