= Andalucia (Tito & Tarantula album) =

Studio album by Tito & Tarantula
- Released: 2002
- Recorded: Málaga, Spain, at el cortijo studios Eraserhead studios, Glendale, California; Coney Island Studios, Glendale, California; Electromos Studios, Osnabrück, Germany
- Genre: Chicano rock, Latin alternative, stoner rock
- Length: 51:44
- Label: BMG
- Producer: BigDaddyT

Tito & Tarantula chronology
Little Bitch (2000)	Andalucia (2002)	Back into the Darkness (2008)

Andalucia is the fourth studio album by Los Angeles rock band Tito & Tarantula, released in 2002. The album marked several line-up changes in the band, which had previously consisted of lead singer/rhythm guitarist Tito Larriva, lead guitarist Peter Atanasoff, and drummer Johnny "Vatos" Hernandez. This album featured the debut of lead guitarist Steven Hufsteter – who had previously played with Larriva in the Cruzados, bassist Io Perry, and keyboardist Marcus Praed.

The band toured promoting the album for several years. They also filmed a music video for the song "California Girl". However, upon seeing how bad the footage of the video was, Perry threw up, Larriva threatened to quit, and Atanasoff was not seen around for days. So, to compensate, Larriva made his own video for the song using the eight dollars he had in his pocket. In the last 40 seconds of the song "Effortless", Larriva, Atanasoff, and Perry can be heard laughing while they watch the "California Girl" music video.

The song "La Flor De Mal" is a cover of a Cruzados song that Larriva and Hufsteter wrote when they were in the Cruzados.

== Track listing ==
All songs written by Tito Larriva, Peter Atanasoff, Steven Hufsteter, Io Perry, and Johnny "Vatos" Hernandez except where noted.

1. "Missed Your Eyes" – 3:06
2. "It's My Mistake" – 3:17
3. "California Girl" – 3:30
4. "You're the One I Love" (Larriva, Atanasoff, Perry, Hernandez) – 3:16
5. "Torn to Pieces" – 2:55
6. "Hey Hey Hey Whada Say" (Larriva, Atanasoff, Hufsteter, Perry, Hernandez, Bernie Larsen) – 2:13
7. "Bullets from a Gun" (Larriva, Atanasoff, Hufsteter, Perry, Hernandez, Mark Goldenberg) – 5:30
8. "Make Me" – 4:11
9. "My Power Is in Your Hands" – 4:04
10. "Ready Made" – 3:20
11. "Effortless" – 4:22
12. "In Between" – 3:18
13. "Mexican Sky" – 4:16

=== Bonus track ===
14. "La Flor De Mal" (Larriva, Hufsteter) – 4:26

=== Bonus video ===
1. Video: Tito & Tarantula Live In Germany (Documentary 1999)

=== Limited edition bonus tracks - Malaga Acoustic Session ===
1. "You're the One I Love" [Acoustic Version] (Larriva, Atanasoff, Perry, Hernandez)
2. "In Between" [Acoustic Version]
3. "Make Me" [Acoustic Version]
4. "Torn to Pieces" [Acoustic Version] (Larriva, Atanasoff, Hufsteter, Perry, Hernandez, Larsen)
5. "Mexican Sky" [Acoustic Version]

== Personnel ==
- Tito Larriva – lead vocals, rhythm guitar, one-finger keyboards", assistant engineer
- Peter Atanasoff – lead guitar, backing vocals
- Steven Hufsteter – lead guitar, backing vocals
- Io Perry – bass, backing vocals
- Marcus Praed – piano, backing vocals, engineer, mixing
- Johnny "Vatos" Hernandez – drums

=== Additional personnel ===
- Ry Hoover – additional guitar on "California Girl", assistant engineer, mixing

=== Production ===
- Joel Soyfer – mixing
- Gavin Lurssen – mastering
