= Cruzado (disambiguation) =

The word cruzado (Portuguese for "crusader") may mean:

- the Brazilian cruzado, Brazilian currency from 1986 to 1989
- the Brazilian cruzado novo, Brazilian currency from 1989 to 1990
- the Portuguese cruzado, an old Portuguese coin, either gold (15th centuries) or silver (16th to 19th centuries)
- Cruzados, an American rock band of the 1980s
- Cruzados, the debut album of the Cruzados rock band

== People with the surname ==
- Luis Cruzado (1941–2013), Peruvian footballer
- Rinaldo Cruzado (born 1984), Peruvian footballer
