= After Dark (Cruzados album) =

Studio album by Cruzados
- Released: 1987
- Recorded: Ocean Way, The Complex, Baby-O, Record One, Summa, Rock Steady, Music Grinder, and Studio One
- Genre: Chicano rock, rock
- Length: 38:09
- Label: Arista
- Producer: Greg Ladanyi, Waddy Wachtel, Rodney Mills, Tom Kelly, Billy Steinberg

Cruzados chronology
Cruzados (1985)	After Dark (1987)	Unreleased Early Recordings (2001)

After Dark is the second album by the American band Cruzados, released in 1987. "Bed of Lies" reached No. 4 on Billboard's Album Rock Tracks chart; "Small Town Love" peaked at No. 39. The band supported the album with a North American tour that included a leg opening for Fleetwood Mac. They broke up the following year.

== Production ==
The album was produced by Greg Ladanyi, Waddy Wachtel, Rodney Mills, Tom Kelly, and Billy Steinberg. Marshall Rohner replaced Steven Hufsteter on lead guitar. "Road of Truth" contains contributions from JD Souther on backing vocals and Paul Butterfield on harmonica; Souther was in the same studio as Cruzados and told the band that he wanted to sing on the track. It was Butterfield's final recording. Pat Benatar sang on "I Want Your World to Turn".

The songs were inspired by Tito Larriva's years living in El Paso and Mexico City. "Blue Sofa" was originally done by his band the Plugz. "Bed of Lies" was cowritten by Lynne Marie Stewart.

== Critical reception ==
Professional ratings
Review scores
Source	Rating
AllMusic	4/5 stars
Chicago Sun-Times	3.5/4 stars
The Encyclopedia of Popular Music	2/5 stars
Houston Chronicle	4.5/5 stars
Los Angeles Times	3/4 stars

Trouser Press called the album "a plain but solid effort" aside from "Time for Waiting", opining that it "sounds nauseatingly like the Eagles." The Los Angeles Times noted the "Springsteen-Mellencamp-Petty territory," writing that "Larriva has developed into a good-enough singer and songwriter in the Little Steven/Southside Johnny vein that the record transcends its obvious reference points." The San Diego Union-Tribune stated that "Cruzados play with the fire of the young Rolling Stones, but the fervor is wasted on a collection of weak songs."

The St. Petersburg Times wrote that Larriva's "desperate vocals and yearning lyrics—coupled with the group's leftover punk instincts—gives After Dark a taut, emotional edge that California-rock always lacked." The Chicago Sun-Times concluded that Larriva "is making music with far greater focus and immediacy than last time through." The Omaha World-Herald determined that "despite the radio-friendly, slick production work ... several tunes here are membrane-thin in staying power." The Houston Chronicle labeled the album "honest, lyrically incisive music that hoists [the band] onto the cutting edge of contemporary American rock."

== Track listing ==
All songs written by Tito Larriva, except where noted.

1. "Small Town Love" (Larriva, Tony Marsico) – 3:57
2. "Bed of Lies" (Larriva, L. Stewart) – 3:36
3. "Road of Truth" (Larriva, Marsico) – 3:08
4. "Last Ride" (Marshall Rohner, Larriva, Marsico) – 3:57
5. "Time for Waiting" – 3:57
6. "Young and on Fire" – 3:06
7. "Summer's Come, Summer's Gone" – 3:36
8. "I Want Your World to Turn" (Tom Kelly, Billy Steinberg) – 4:13
9. "Chains of Freedom" – 3:47
10. "Blue Sofa (Still a Fool)" – 4:58

== Personnel ==
- Marshall Rohner – lead guitar, backing vocals
- Tito Larriva – rhythm guitar, lead vocals
- Tony Marsico – bass, backing vocals
- Charlie Quintana – drums, percussion

Additional personnel

- Don Henley – backing vocals on "Small Town Love"
- Paul Butterfield – harmonica on "Road of Truth"
- JD Souther – backing vocals on "Road of Truth"
- E.G. Daily – backing vocals on "Time for Waiting"
- Andy Williams – backing vocals on "Summer's Come, Summer's Gone"
- David Williams – backing vocals on "Summer's Come, Summer's Gone"
- Frank Marsico – marimba on "I Want Your World to Turn"
- Pat Benatar – backing vocals on "I Want Your World to Turn"
- Paulinho Da Costa – percussion
- Paul Fox – keyboards
- Charles Judge – keyboards
- Tom Kelly – keyboards
- Jim Lang – keyboards
- Jai Winding – keyboards
- Jerry Peterson – saxophone on "Blue Sofa (Still a Fool)"
- Waddy Wachtel – guitar
- Charlo Crossley – backing vocals
- David Lasley – backing vocals

Production

- Waddy Wachtel – mixing, producer
- Rodney Mills – engineering, producer
- Greg Ladanyi – engineering, mixing, producer
- George Tutko – engineering
- Tom Kelly – producer
- Billy Steinberg – producer
- Brendan O'Brien – additional engineering
- Barry Conley – additional engineering
- Shep Lonsdale – additional engineering
- Dennis Kirk – additional engineering
- Sharon Rice – additional engineering
- Mark Ettel – additional engineering
- Doug Sax – mastering
