= Cruzados (album) =

Studio album by Cruzados
- Released: 1985
- Recorded: 1985; Los Angeles
- Genre: Chicano rock, blues rock
- Length: 41:01
- Label: Arista
- Producer: Rodney Mills

Cruzados chronology
Cruzados (1985)	After Dark (1987)

Cruzados is the 1985 debut album of Los Angeles rock band the Cruzados. It featured the band's "classic line-up" of Tito Larriva, Steven Hufsteter, Tony Marsico, and Chalo Quintana. It also featured the band's best known songs, such as "Motorcycle Girl" "Flor De Mal" and "Just Like Roses".

== Track listing ==
1. "Wasted Years" (Steven Hufsteter)
2. "Rising Sun" (Tito Larriva, Hufsteter, Tony Marsico, Chalo Quintana)
3. "Hanging Out in California" (Hufsteter)
4. "Motorcycle Girl (Larriva, Marsico)
5. "Flor De Mal" (Larriva, Hufsteter)
6. "Cryin' Eyes" (Larriva, Marsico)
7. "Seven Summers" (Larriva)
8. "Some Day" (Larriva)
9. "1,000 Miles" (Larriva, Marsico)
10. "Just Like Roses" (Hufsteter)

== Personnel ==
- Tito Larriva - rhythm guitar, lead vocals
- Steven Hufsteter - lead guitar
- Tony Marsico - bass, backing vocals
- Chalo Quintana - drums, percussion

=== Additional personnel ===
- David Williams - backing vocals on "Wasted Years", "Rising Sun", and "Hanging Out in California"
- J.J. Holiday - slide guitar on "Seven Summers"
- Spyder Littleman - saxophone on "Seven Summers"
- Gregory Kuehn - keyboards on "1,000 Miles" and "Just Like Roses"
- Steve McRay - organ - on "Motorcycle Girl" and "Cryin' Eyes"
- Paulinho Da Costa - percussion on "Hanging Out in California"
- M.B. Gordy - percussion on "Some Day"
- Frank Marsico - marimba on "Flor De Mal"
- Walter Fowler - emulator programming
- Paul Fox - emulator programming
- Patrick Foley - "drum wiz"
- Paul Greenstein - 1937 Indian Motorcycle sound effects on "Motorcycle Girl"

=== Production ===
- Rodney Mills - producer, engineer
- Bob Ludwig - mastering
- Rik Pekkonen - track engineering
- Gregory M. Quesnel - mixing
- Gary Gross - photography
- Jane Hoffman - styling
- Wendy Ann Rosen - make-up
- Clifford Peterson - hair-styling
- Don Davenport - art direction
