= Hungry Sally & Other Killer Lullabies =

Studio album by Tito & Tarantula
- Released: 1999
- Recorded: Track Record Studios; Eraserhead Studios
- Genre: Chicano rock
- Length: 62:06
- Label: Cockroach Records
- Producer: Tito Larriva; Julian Mack

Tito & Tarantula chronology
Tarantism (1997)	Hungry Sally & Other Killer Lullabies (1999)	Little Bitch (2000)

Hungry Sally & Other Killer Lullabies is the second studio album by Tito & Tarantula, released in 1999. The album was their first to feature drummer Johnny "Vatos" Hernandez, who had been hired as a percussionist shortly after the release of their debut album, Tarantism, replacing Nick Vincent. Hernandez, who previously had played in the new wave band Oingo Boingo, provided a more solid, powerful drumming sound for the band, as opposed to Vincent's highly blues-influenced style. The album also featured the departure of multi-instrumentalist Lyn Bertles, who the band chose not to replace, reducing it to a four-piece. Instead, all the violin and mandolin parts were recorded by session musician Petra Haden. The band later elected to hire Andi Figueroa for the position when they went on tour, who played on their next album, Little Bitch, as a session musician.

AllMusic stated in its review of the album, "Tito and Tarantula stretch out beyond the dark blues idiom they explored to the depths on Tarantism, though tracks like 'Bleeding Roses' are no less dark or moody."

== Track listing ==
All tracks are written by Peter Atanasoff, Tito Larriva, Jennifer Condos, Johnny "Vatos" Hernandez and Petra Haden, except where noted.

No.	Title	Writer(s)	Length
1.	"Bleeding Roses"	Atanasoff, Larriva, Condos, Lyn Bertles, Nick Vincent	5:48
2.	"When You Cry"		5:55
3.	"Love in My Blood"	Atanasoff, Larriva, Condos, Bertles, Vincent	3:57
4.	"Slow Dream"	Atanasoff, Larriva, Condos, Bertles, Vincent, Hernandez	4:20
5.	"Hungry Sally"		6:46
6.	"My German Fräulein"	Atanasoff, Larriva, Condos, Bertles, Vincent, Hernandez	4:26
7.	"Betcha Can't Play"		1:34
8.	"Clumsy Beautiful World"		3:44
9.	"Devil's in Love"		4:06
10.	"Woke up Blind"		10:51
11.	"Pieces of Time (All in a Line)" "Crucified (hidden track)"	Atanasoff, Larriva, Condos; Larriva and Atanasoff	5:12; 5:27
Total length:			62:06

== Personnel ==
- Peter Atanasoff – lead guitar, backing vocals
- Tito Larriva – rhythm guitar, lead vocals, recorder, "one finger" piano, engineer
- Jennifer Condos – bass, backing vocals
- Johnny "Vatos" Hernandez – percussion, drums, backing vocals

=== Additional personnel ===
- Petra Haden – violin, mandolin, additional guitar, additional recorder
- Chris "Up Yers" Rugulo – additional guitar, additional percussion, assistant engineer, "right hand"
- Julian Mack – piano, engineer, mixing, mastering
- Scotty Boy – background barking

=== Production ===
- Sergio Garcia – assistant engineer
- Mike Terry – assistant engineer
- Chris Ballman – mastering
- Andre Recke – executive producer, manager, band photos
- Gil Gastelum – "true believer"
- Gary Panter – illustrations
- Felix Mack – "digital stuff"
