= From Dusk Till Dawn (soundtrack) =

1996 soundtrack album

From Dusk Till Dawn: Music from the Motion Picture

Soundtrack album to From Dusk till Dawn by Various artists
- Released: January 23, 1996
- Genres: Texas blues; Chicano rock; Tex-Mex; alternative country; neotraditional country; film score
- Length: 48:21
- Languages: English; Spanish
- Labels: Los Hooligans; Epic
- Producers: Robert Rodriguez; Jeff Eyrich; Bill Ham; Billy Gibbons; David Vaught; Evan York; Jimmie Vaughan; Mark Goldenberg; Tito Larriva; Stevie Ray Vaughan; Graeme Revell

Singles from From Dusk Till Dawn: Music from the Motion Picture

Professional ratings
Review scores
Source	Rating
Allmusic	2/5 stars

From Dusk Till Dawn: Music from the Motion Picture is the soundtrack album for the 1996 action-dark comedy-horror film, From Dusk till Dawn, directed by Robert Rodriguez and screenplay by Quentin Tarantino. The album is predominantly Texas blues, featuring such artists as ZZ Top, Stevie Ray Vaughan and Jimmie Vaughan. The film's score was composed by Graeme Revell, and two short excerpts of his work are featured on the album. There are also extracts of dialogue from the film. The Chicano rock band Tito & Tarantula, who portrayed the band in the Titty Twister bar, appears on the soundtrack as well.

== Track listing ==
No.	Title	Writer(s)	Artist(s)	Length
1.	"Everybody Be Cool" (Dialogue)		George Clooney	0:04
2.	"Dark Night"	Dave Alvin	The Blasters	3:48
3.	"Mexican Blackbird"	Billy Gibbons; Dusty Hill; Frank Beard	ZZ Top	3:03
4.	"Texas Funeral"	David Vaught	Jon Wayne	2:32
5.	"Foolish Heart"	Raul Malo; Evan York	The Mavericks	3:32
6.	"Would You Do Me a Favor?" (Dialogue)		Juliette Lewis and Quentin Tarantino	0:11
7.	"Dengue Woman Blues"	Jimmie Vaughan	Jimmie Vaughan	6:23
8.	"Torquay"	George Tomsco	The Leftovers	2:41
9.	"She's Just Killing Me"	Gibbons; Hill; Beard	ZZ Top	4:55
10.	"Chet's Speech" (Dialogue)		Cheech Marin	0:42
11.	"Angry Cockroaches (Cucarachas Enojadas)"	Tito Larriva; Peter Atanasoff	Tito & Tarantula	5:14
12.	"Mary Had a Little Lamb"	Buddy Guy	Stevie Ray Vaughan and Double Trouble	4:15
13.	"After Dark"	Larriva; Steven Hufsteter	Tito & Tarantula	4:11
14.	"Willie the Wimp (And His Cadillac Coffin)"	Bill Carter; Ruth Ellsworth	Stevie Ray Vaughan and Double Trouble	4:34
15.	"Kill the Band" (Dialogue)		Tom Savini	0:05
16.	"Mexican Standoff"	Graeme Revell	Graeme Revell	0:49
17.	"Sex Machine Attacks"	Revell	Graeme Revell	1:22
18.	"Chet's Speech, Part II" (Dialogue)		Cheech Marin	0:28
Total length:				48:21

== Charts ==
=== Weekly charts ===
Chart (1997)	Peak position
Hungarian Albums (MAHASZ)	36

== Certifications and sales ==
Region	Certification	Certified units/sales
United Kingdom (BPI)	Silver	60,000^{^}
Summaries
Worldwide	—	500,000
^{^} Shipments figures based on certification alone.
