= The Brat (band) =

American rock band

The Brat was a Chicano punk rock ensemble originating from the barrios of East Los Angeles, California. Its three core members were lead singer Teresa Covarrubias, lead guitarist Rudy Medina, and alternate lead and rhythm guitarist Sidney Medina. From their conception in late 1978 to their eventual break-up in 1985, The Brat contributed to the customization and intermeshing of multiple musical and cultural models that culminated in the distinct East Los Angeles, Chicano punk sound.

Along with being pioneers in the East Los Angeles punk movement, they are best known for their five song EP Attitudes, released in 1980 through the independent label Fatima Records, while contributing to the understanding of the many ways culture transforms and challenges dominant hegemonic ideologies.

== Beginnings ==
Teresa Covarrubias was a Chicana who was born and raised in the Boyle Heights section of East Los Angeles. She attended Boyle heights Elementary School and Resurrection school, Sacred Heart of Jesus High School and studied psychology at California State University, Los Angeles for two years. Musicians such as Bob Dylan, The Rolling Stones, Benny Goodman and David Bowie had a heavy influence on the young musician as they influenced her to seek alternative forms of music that deviated from the mainstream. This drive to seek alternative forms of media was only heightened when her sister returned to her D.I.Y. (Do It Yourself) punk fanzines from Germany — immediately attracting her to the underground subculture.

Guitarists Rudy Medina and Sidney Medina (who, despite being uncle and nephew, were very close in age) lived only a mile away from Teresa in the same section of Los Angeles. Although practically neighbors, the Medinas grew up in a completely different household compared to Teresa. Unlike Teresa, who was second generation Chicana, the Medinas were first generation Chicanos, whose parents immigrated to the United States through the bracero program. Their parents were extremely traditional and non-English-speaking, maintaining a strong sense of their cultural identity. Both Rudy and Sidney were classically trained musicians specializing in classical guitar and regularly performed as a duet in recitals through a small music and art center targeting low-income families who desired their children to be exposed to musical instruction. Rudy’s record collection consisted of the usual suspects of the era, heavy on guitar, rock, and iconic legends. But in and amongst the heavy rock were albums by outsiders such as The Clash, David Bowie, The New York Dolls, and Sparks. Rudy eventually studied at California State University Los Angeles, graduating with a Bachelor of Arts in music while Sidney, who also attended the university, did not finish.

Teresa and Rudy met during the record release show for English punk band The Jam on April 14, 1978 at the Starwood, a nightclub in West Hollywood, California. Their meeting blossomed into friendship and eventual musical collaboration when Teresa replaced Rudy’s singer, leading to the formation of The Brat.

== Overview of a short-lived career ==
The group began performing mostly at backyard parties and high school gymnasiums covering past and present top radio hits of their time. They experienced immediate local recognition as they could be regularly spotted playing local backyard shows. However it was extremely difficult to sign under a label and play West Los Angeles venues in a time where the city was still greatly segregated. East Los Angeles was primarily made up of low income, working class poor while West Los Angeles was blooming with the wealthier, affluent middle class and elites where many popular venues were located. Until then there was no official venue for new and upcoming East Los Angeles punk bands to prove their worthiness of mainstream stardom. It was not until March 22, 1980 when the very first venue showcasing East Los Angeles local punk bands was opened by Willie Herron, frontman of another local group, Los Illegals. The Vex (as the venue was named) shared occupancy above the same commercial space of the influential art gallery Self Help Graphics.

Once The Brat began to regularly showcase their music — through the Vex and multiple backyard shows in the community instating their presence among local groups such as The Plugz, Los Illegals, Odd Squad, and the Cruzados — they landed a record contract with Fatima Records. Tito Larriva of The Plugz and Fatima Records and local business owner Yolanda Comparran championed the band, and, by the end of 1980, chose The Brat to launch their new label. The contract also led to The Brat's first and only release.

With Teresa's screaming vocals and Rudy's and Sidney's multidisciplinary guitar, the five song EP was a prime example of customization and transculturation of popular musical genres. Covarrubia's driving vocals of the Mexican American experience with a focus on social and economic inequality engaged in dialogue about the pervasive invisibility and alienation her community — including herself — faced in East L.A. Other songs contain influences from reggae and other local and influential West Los Angeles punk bands such as X. These themes of the collective experience of struggle between their community within a semi narrative fashion reflected corrido ballads popular in Mexico. The unreleased song "The Wolf", engages in the narrative of the struggle of dominant social elites against the popular working poor who maintain their dominance over marginalized communities through violence and neglect of their counter-hegemonic history. Like the corridos of Mexico, The Brat produced their music to express the historical and then contemporary challenges Mexican Americans faced in the United States. Scholar George Lipsitz categorized their music as a "historic bloc" as it provided counter master narratives challenging dominant hegemonic ideologies in the United States, especially in East Los Angeles. This multiplicity of musical genres that embody the music of The Brat also evidenced its transculturation status as it was a product of customization of Caribbean, Mexican, American and European influences. These processes occurred in areas like East Los Angeles where multiple distinct cultural models were in constant contact with one another.

After their release, the group experienced yet another hint of success as their growing popularity pushed them to open for major groups such as R.E.M. and Adam and the Ants. Although their music contained a rich history and formation as the band experienced small-time success, they disbanded in 1985 after the growing frustrations of failing to sign with a major record label and growing apathy towards the scene.

However, they did sign with Par Records and released an album as Act of Faith.

== Family resemblance: Impact of Los Angeles punk as an agent of unification ==
As previously mentioned, there existed an East versus West L.A. rivalry that led to the exclusion of many Chicano punk bands from performing in many of the West Los Angeles clubs. In interviews, Willie Herron and Teresa Covarrubias had expressed that their exclusion was a result of stratified boundaries based on geographical location, race, and class. Yet, as scholars have mentioned, these borders had become blurred and finally unrecognizable. George Lipsitz discusses how, at times, certain elements and themes of a particular cultural structure can sometimes reflect that of another distinct cultural group. These somewhat similar experiences or cultural memories are what he defines as "family resemblance" to explain intercultural relations. In this case, West L.A. punk was primarily composed of children of elites who deviated from their status quo, privileged positions and undertook a process of self-marginalization and isolation resulting from their growing discontent of mainstream society. Experience of self-exclusion and isolation represented itself in the music produced by West L.A. punks, whereas music produced in the Eastern half of Los Angeles similarly echoed experiences and memories of anger and discontent towards the isolation and marginalization that dominant society imposed on them.

Another very important aspect of the common resemblance both groups shared was their gravitation to the D.I.Y. subcultural ethic that punk centralized. This hands-on approach to music, art, and community attracted many musicians from the West and East side — like Teresa Covarrubias — towards punk. Their similar hands-on approach with their community constructed similar experiences had by these individuals and eventually created what many scholars would call an imaginary community that crossed multiple boundaries of identity.

The common experience of oppression, marginalization, and isolation, and the focus of the D.I.Y. ethic, led to cross-cultural similarities that ultimately united both groups who had originated from very distinct class, racial, and geographical backgrounds.
