= Joe Galarza =

American artist

Joe "Peps" Galarza is a Chicano artist, educator, and musician based in Los Angeles. He is the bassist for the Chicano rap group Aztlan Underground.

== Biography ==
Joe Galarza was raised in the El Sereno neighborhood on the east side of Los Angeles. Growing up in an economically-disadvantaged largely Latino community, he was exposed to a lot of gang violence, crime, and drug abuse. As a result, he became an educator for at-risk youth, and teaches art at correctional facilities and community centers. In 2008, he led a mural workshop with high school students on the Pine Ridge Indian Reservation for their Death to Meth campaign. He collaborated with Tongva Native elder, Julia Bognay, to create murals on the Pitzer College campus to acknowledge indigenous land and stories. He has worked with the Ventura County Arts Council to lead mural workshops for the elementary schools and for their Art & Youth justice program. In 2016, Galarza along with artist Raul Baltazar, created one of the 31 angel statues for the California Community Foundation’s 100 years of service to Los Angeles County public art display. Galarza has also taught art at University of Redlands, Pitzer College, and Self-Help Graphics. Along with artist and scholar Marisol L. Torres, he formed the art collective Arte Toltecaytol. He is a multi-disciplinary artist who creates paintings, murals, sculptures, music, and musical instruments. Galarza is best known for being a member of the award-winning Chicano rap band, Aztlan Underground which has toured internationally and has opened for large acts such as Rage Against the Machine.

== Arte Toltecaytol ==
ArteToltecaytol is an artist collective founded by Joe Galarza and Marisol L. Torres. The collective has created murals and led arts workshops throughout southern California. They were commissioned by Academia Semillas del Pueblo Xinaxcalmecac, an Indigenous Mexican public charter school in East Los Angeles, to create a mural program for the school titled, “Tonacayotl” which means "fruits of the land/sustenance" and features various Indigenous gods.

== Exhibitions ==
Genetic Wind Songs is a solo online exhibition and performance space created by Joe Galarza to showcase the negative effects of colonization in the Americas including erosion of Indian American culture and death to the people. In November 2020, Joe Galarza performed as Genetic Wind Songs of Truth and Revolt at Rio Hondo College in East Los Angeles.

== Artworks ==
2019 Channel Islands University Mural at University Hall - Lead artist for Michele Serros Mural

2019 Redlands University Mural for Think Indian Program - Lead artist/muralist in collaboration with Desert Sage

2019 Camp Rocky Juvenile Hall - Lead Artist for Mural with Boyle Heights Arts Conservatory

2018 Self-Help Graphics - Lead Artist For 100 Year Anniversary of LA Philharmonic/Ciclavia and Day of The Dead ceremony

2018 Camp Rockey Juvenile Detention Center Mural with AIYN/ Armory Center for the Arts

2018 Barry J. Nidorf Juvenile Hall - Compound Mural - Lead Artist with youth serving life sentence

2017 Pitzer College Mural - Lead muralist

1998 Monte Vista Elementary School Mural - "Tonantzin" in collaboration with Daniel Cervantes and Ozomatli

== Arts Activism ==
2019 Homeboy Industries - Inter-generational trauma informed art workshop

2016 Camp Scott - Juvenile Detention Center mural workshop

2014 Youth Action Party and Mendocino County Youth Project Muralist Instructor for Native Pomo youth project

2012 Migrant Education Program, 1st Street Elementary School Art & Drawing Instructor
