= Dominatrix (band) =

U.S. musical group

- Origin: New York City, New York
- Genres: Synthpop, freestyle
- Years active: 1983–1984
- Labels: Streetwise Records
- Members: Stuart Argabright; Ivan Ivan; Dominique Davalos; Ken Lockie; Peter Baumann; Claudia Summers

Dominatrix was an American synthpop band from New York City, best remembered for their 1984 club hit, "The Dominatrix Sleeps Tonight". Although the group was short lived, their lone hit single was highly influential in the freestyle genre.

== History ==
Producer/songwriter Stuart Argabright (formerly of Ike Yard) formed Dominatrix with vocalist Claudia Summers, Ivan Ivan (AKA Ivan Baker), Ken Lockie and keyboardist Peter Baumann. When Claudia Summers parted ways with the group, musician and actress Dominique Davalos took her place.

The band's only single was the controversial "The Dominatrix Sleeps Tonight," released in 1984. The track became a pioneering force in the freestyle genre, and was noted for its use of spoken lyrics. The song's video, directed by Beth B., featured a fur and stocking-clad Dominique Davalos, and it was the imagery in the video set against the subject matter of the song that prevented it from becoming a mainstream success. Commercial radio stations banned the single, and MTV refused to air the risque video. In 2012, the video was placed on display in the contemporary art wing of the Museum of Modern Art in New York City.

Though the song was doomed to commercial failure in the pop charts, it went to number two for two weeks on the dance charts, spending a total of eighteen weeks on the chart. The song became a highly popular single in New York clubs where Dominatrix performed regularly, and also made waves throughout Europe.

Due to the success of "The Dominatrix Sleeps Tonight," the group toured as an opening act for Grace Jones, but soon dissolved to pursue other musical projects. Stuart Argabright has continued working as a producer and Dominique Davalos has appeared in several films and released solo records of her own. She now plays in The Blue Bonnets, an all-female rock band. In 2012, she joined the three piece rock band SuperEtte with local Austin musicians Susie Martinez and Matthew Phebus. They recorded their first EP, titled "Yours Till The End," in March, 2014.

The song was featured in the 1986 film Parting Glances, the 1997 film Grosse Pointe Blank and the 2010 film Jean-Michel Basquiat: The Radiant Child. In 2022, Rolling Stone ranked "The Dominatrix Sleeps Tonight" number 119 in their list of the "200 Greatest Dance Songs of All Time".
