= Ike Yard =

Experimental band founded in 1980

- Origin: New York City, United States
- Genres: No wave, electronic, post-punk, industrial, experimental
- Years active: 1980–1983, 2007–present
- Labels: Disques du Crépuscule, Factory, Acute
- Members: Kenneth Compton; Michael Diekmann; Stuart Argabright
- Past members: Fred Szymanski

Ike Yard is an experimental band founded in 1980 in New York and consisting of members Stuart Argabright (drums, percussion, synthesizer, vocals), Kenny Compton (bass, synthesizer, vocals), Fred Szymanski (synthesizers/ programming) and Michael Diekmann (guitar, synthesizer). Formed in the later days of New York's no wave scene, they recorded for labels like Disques du Crépuscule and Factory in the early 1980s, and were the first American band to be signed to the latter UK label. Initially drawing on early krautrock and dub-influenced post-punk, their work increasingly incorporated drum machines and analog electronics. After releasing their 1982 debut album, Ike Yard dissolved at the beginning of 1983. Argabright later recorded as Dominatrix.

After Acute Records released the well-received career anthology Ike Yard: 1980–82 Collected, the band reformed as a three-piece unit with original members Stuart Argabright, Kenneth Compton and Michael Diekmann in 2007. After a hiatus of roughly 28 years, Danish/Swedish imprint Phisteria released Öst, a limited edition 10-inch, which was followed by their latest full-length, Nord, Phisteria licensing the album to Desire Records for worldwide distribution. In 2017 the Vienna based label Noiztank released an EP Sacred Machine, and then in 2018 the album Rejoy. This was followed by an album of remixes Remix in 2019. In 2024 the San Francisco based label Dark Entries released an album of music recorded in 1982, titled 1982.

== Discography ==
- Night After Night (EP, 1981)
- Ike Yard (LP, 1982)
- 1980-82 Collected (compilation, 2006)
- Öst (EP, 2009)
- Nord (LP, 2010)
- Sacred Machine (EP, 2017)
- Rejoy (LP, 2018)
- Remixes (EP, 2019)
- 1982 (LP, 2024)
