= Don Davenport =

Australian rules footballer

Personal information
- Full name: Don Davenport
- Born: 18 April 1945
- Original team: Loch
- Height: 175 cm (5 ft 9 in)
- Weight: 76 kg (168 lb)
- Position: Wing / Rover

Playing career^{1}
Years	Club	Games (Goals)
1964–67, 1969, 1971	Richmond	56 (38)
- ^{1} Playing statistics correct to the end of 1971.

Don Davenport (born 18 April 1945) is a former Australian rules footballer who played with Richmond in the Victorian Football League (VFL).
