= Dominique Davalos =

American actress (born 1965)

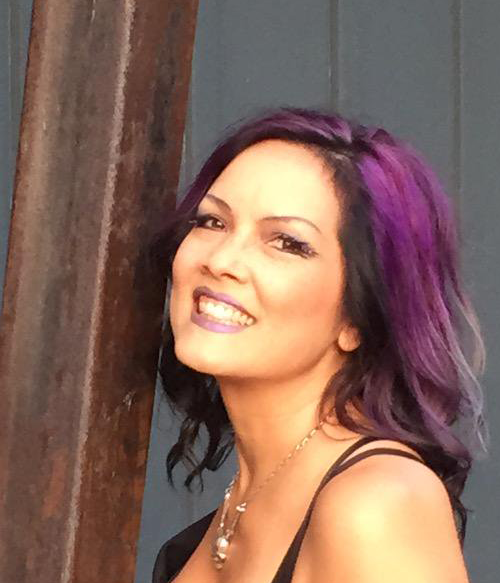
- Born: November 5, 1965 (age 60); Canoga Park, Los Angeles, California U.S.
- Occupations: Rock musician, actress
- Parent(s): Richard Davalos; Ellen Van Der Hoeven
- Relatives: Elyssa Davalos (sister); Alexa Davalos (niece)

Dominique Davalos (born November 5, 1965) is an American musician, rock singer and bass player.

== Biography ==
Born in Canoga Park, Los Angeles, her father was actor Richard Davalos and her sister is actress Elyssa Davalos. She is of Finnish and Spanish heritage from her father's side.

== Music ==
Formerly in the band Dominatrix, whose controversial music video single "The Dominatrix Sleeps Tonight", released in 1984, was deemed too racy for its time. The song's video, directed by Beth B., featured a fur and stocking-clad Davalos. Commercial radio stations banned the single, and cable channel MTV refused to air the risque video. In 2012, the video was placed on display in the contemporary art wing of the Museum of Modern Art in New York City.

Davalos worked with former Go-Go Kathy Valentine under the name The Delphines. They released two albums: The Delphines (1996) and Cosmic Speed (2001). Davalos' and Valentine's current band, The BlueBonnets, has released 3 albums, Boom Boom Boom Boom (2010), Play Loud (2014) and Tonewrecker (2017). They are currently touring the United States to support this latest release. Davalos and Valentine also play in the band Lady Band Johnson with Johnny Goudie.

Davalos is currently writing and singing in an all-female rock band called Dogs and Diamonds in Austin, TX. Dogs and Diamonds formed in the summer of 2016 and released their album Last Free Exit in 2018. Last Free Exit was produced by Chris "Frenchie" Smith in the Bubble, Austin TX. Davalos previously wrote, sang and played bass with another Austin Texas born band SuperEtte who released their second EP When People Are Cold And Hard And Hate in 2016. The first EP Yours Til The End was released in 2014.

As a bass player Davalos has played bass for The Keenen Ivory Wayans Show, Tito & Tarantula, and Gods Hotel Featuring Spike from The Quireboys.

== Acting ==
As an actress, Davalos is best known for such films as Salvation!, A Woman Under the Influence, Howard the Duck and Stump the Band.

She most recently appeared in the film Virgin Cheerleader In Chains.

== Discography ==
Studio Albums / EPs

- The Delphines - The Delphines (1996)
- The Delphines - Cosmic Speed (2001)
- Drag - Drag (2001)
- Drag - Loose Like Brando (2005)
- The BlueBonnets - Boom Boom Boom Boom (2010)
- SuperEtte - Yours Til The End (2014)
- The BlueBonnets - Play Loud (2014)
- SuperEtte - When People Are Cold And Hard And Hate (2016)
- The BlueBonnets - Tonewreker (2017)
- Dogs And Diamonds - Last Free Exit (2018)
