= Tito Larriva =

American songwriter (born 1953)

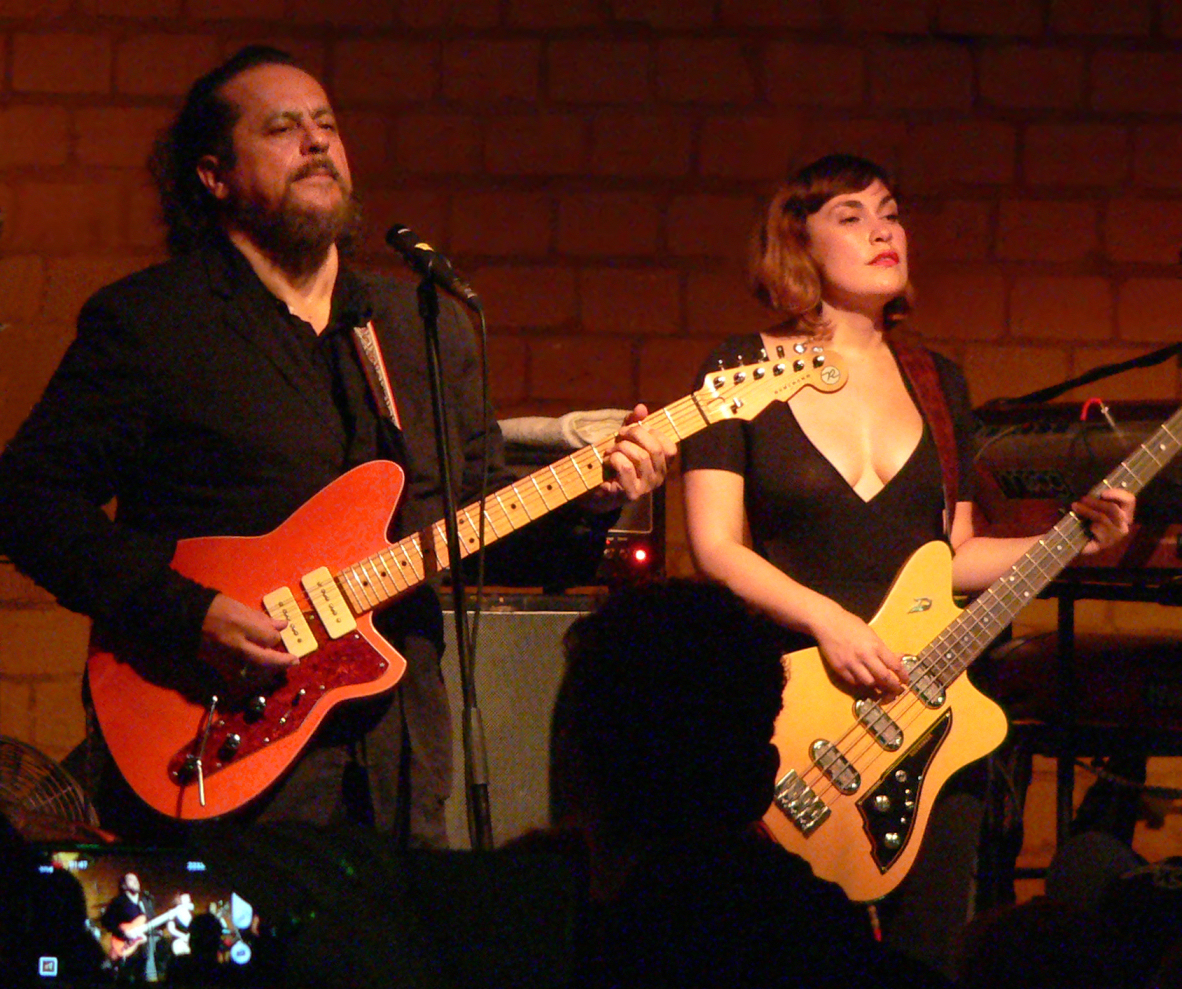
- Tito Larriva and his daughter Lolita Carroll Larriva in 2016

Background information
- Born: Humberto Lorenzo Rodriquez Larriva; 1953 (age 72–73); Ciudad Juárez, Chihuahua, Mexico
- Genres: Rock; punk rock; alternative rock; Chicano rock
- Occupations: Singer; guitarist; songwriter; musician; actor
- Instruments: Vocals; guitar; keyboards; recorder
- Years active: 1977–present
- Labels: JupiterXrecords; BMG
- Member of: Tito & Tarantula
- Formerly of: Cruzados, The Plugz, Psychotic Aztecs, The Flesh Eaters, The Impalas
- Website: titoandtarantula.com

Humberto "Tito" Larriva (born 1953) is a Mexican-born American songwriter, singer, musician, and actor. He came to prominence leading The Plugz, a Los Angeles punk rock group. Since the 1990s, his main musical outlet has been Tito & Tarantula.

== Early life ==
Larriva was born in Ciudad Juárez, Chihuahua, and grew up in Fairbanks, Alaska, and El Paso, Texas. As a child he played the violin in the school orchestra and sang in the church and school choirs where he met his wife Janet Carroll. In 1972 Larriva snuck into Yale University for a full term without being noticed. After being kicked out of the Ivy League university, he moved to Mexico City and in 1975 moved to Los Angeles, California. He now lives in Austin, Texas, with his wife and daughter and continues to work in the music and film industries.

== Music career ==
=== The Plugz ===
Larriva was the vocalist and rhythm guitarist for punk band The Plugz. He formed The Plugz in Hollywood, California in 1978. Their presence during the birth of West Coast punk has ensured their enduring influence on punk bands. Record label Rhino recognized their role in the Los Angeles music scene by including their version of "La Bamba" on "We're Desperate: The L.A. Scene (1976-79)." The Plugz released two albums, Electrify Me (1978) and Better Luck (1981). The Plugz also scored the cult classic film Repo Man and contributed three songs to the soundtrack.

=== Fatima Records ===
In 1979 Larriva formed Fatima Records, a DIY record label, with Chicano printmaker Richard Duardo and music promoter Yolanda Ferrer to release the Plugz' single "Achin'"/"La Bamba." The label would issue a few other releases, including the Plugz' second album Better Luck (1981) and "Attitudes" (1980), the debut EP by East Los Angeles punk band The Brat (produced by Larriva). Fatima Records was initially slated to release Fire of Love, the debut album by Los Angeles punk blues garage band The Gun Club; however, after Larriva produced six tracks, the label ran out of money, and Ruby Records completed the recordings and released the Gun Club's album.

=== Cruzados ===
In 1984 The Plugz evolved into the Cruzados. In 1985, they released a self-titled album on Arista Records. The second album After Dark released in 1987 featured new guitarist Marshall Rohner. The band broke up in 1990. Larriva and the Cruzados were both briefly featured in the film Road House, starring Patrick Swayze and Sam Elliott.

=== Tito & Tarantula ===
Tito & Tarantula began in 1992 when Larriva and lead guitarist Peter Atanasoff would perform in bars and cafes with friends every week. "We've always had an unspoken rule," Larriva said to the Tucson Weekly in 1997, "and the rule is that everyone plays pretty much what they want. The band rarely rehearses." Tarantula was featured on the soundtrack of Robert Rodriguez's movie Desperado which Larriva also scored. In 1996, Tito and Tarantula continue their relationship with Rodriguez, appearing in the film, soundtrack, and score, for From Dusk till Dawn. Larriva, Atanasoff, and Johnny "Vatos" Hernandez are the band performing their song After Dark in the bar for Salma Hayek. In 1997, Tito & Tarantula released its long-awaited and highly acclaimed debut album Tarantism. They followed up with, Hungry Sally & Other Killer Lullabies in 1999, and Little Bitch in 2000. In 2002, the band was joined by Larriva's former Cruzados bandmate Steven Hufsteter. Later that year, they released Andalucia. 8 Arms To Hold You is their most recent release (2019).

=== Psychotic Aztecs ===
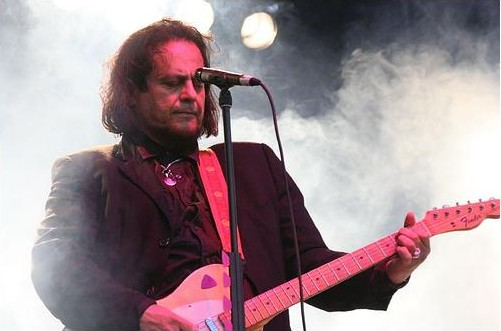
Tito Larriva, September 2007

Psychotic Aztecs, composed of Larriva on vocals, John Avila on bass, Johnny "Vatos" Hernandez on drums, and Steven Hufsteter on guitar, began as a recording session for Grita! Records in Los Angeles and ended as the album Santa Sangre, released in 1999.

== Film career ==
Larriva's first acting role was "Hammy" on The Pee-wee Herman Show in 1981. He has gone on to play notable supporting roles in big-budget films like Born in East L.A., Road House, Eyes of an Angel, Boys on the Side, Desperado, From Dusk till Dawn, and Once Upon a Time in Mexico. He often works with his friend, director Robert Rodriguez. His latest appearance was a few seconds cameo in Rodríguez' Machete trailer in Grindhouse. He also appears in the actual, released movie.

He also played the character Ramon in the film True Stories (1986). Larriva performed the Talking Heads song "Radio Head," and played the organ in the "Puzzling Evidence" scene. The original soundtrack album, however, only featured Talking Heads' cover of the song; Larriva's version, performed with Esteban "Steve" Jordan, was not released until sometime later.

Apart from acting, Larriva has scored films including Dream with the Fishes, Tin Cup, and Mi Vida Loca. Larriva features on the soundtrack album to the 2000 film The Million Dollar Hotel, written by Bono and directed by Wim Wenders. Larriva performs as part of the MDH band (a composite band featuring members of U2) and sings a Spanish version of "Anarchy In The UK" by The Sex Pistols.

== Discography ==
=== The Plugz ===
- Electrify Me (1979)
- Achin/ La Bamba 45 rpm (1981)
- Better Luck (1981)

=== Cruzados ===
- Cruzados (1985)
- After Dark (1987)

=== Tito & Tarantula ===
- Tarantism (1997)
- Hungry Sally & Other Killer Lullabies (1999)
- Little Bitch (2000)
- Andalucia (2002)
- Back into the Darkness (2008)
- 8 Arms To Hold You (2019)

=== Psychotic Aztecs ===
- Santa Sangre (1999)

=== Other ===
- True Stories: The Complete Soundtrack (2018)
