= Cruzados =

American 1980s rock band

Cruzados were a 1980s rock band from Los Angeles, California.

== History ==
Cruzados were formed in 1983 by the members of The Plugz, featuring members Tito Larriva, Tony Marsico, Steven Hufsteter, and Chalo Quintana.

The band's self-titled album on Arista Records, Cruzados, was released in 1985, as well as their second album After Dark in 1987.

Cruzados performed the song "Don't Throw Stones" in the 1989 movie Road House.

In 2021 they released their third studio album, She’s Automatic.

Tito Larriva performs with his band Tito & Tarantula, who are best known for their appearance in the film From Dusk Till Dawn. Steven Hufsteter performs with his band Shrine, as well as with Tito & Tarantula. Quintana played drums for Bob Dylan, Izzy Stradlin & the JuJu Hounds, and Social Distortion. Quintana died in 2018. Marsico became bassist for Bob Dylan, Matthew Sweet, Neil Young, Roger Daltrey, and Marianne Faithfull. Rohner became guitarist for the band T.S.O.L. but died in October 2005.

In 2020, bassist Tony Marsico restarted the Cruzados and released a new album with members Ron Young, Loren Molinare, Mark Tremalgia and Rob Klonel.

== Covers ==
Jenny Morris included a cover of the Cruzados song "Rising Sun" on her 1987 album, Body and Soul.

== Personnel ==
1984-1986 Original line-up	Tito Larriva - rhythm guitar, lead vocals; Chalo Quintana - drums, percussion; Steven Hufsteter - lead guitar; Tony Marsico - bass, backing vocals
1986-1988 Members at the dissolution of the band	Tito Larriva - rhythm guitar, lead vocals; Chalo Quintana - drums, percussion; Tony Marsico - bass, backing vocals; Marshall Rohner - lead guitar, backing vocals

== Album discography ==
Title	Year
Cruzados	1985
After Dark	1987
She's Automatic	2021
Land Of The Endless Sun	2023
