= Tony Marsico =

American bassist and composer

Tony Marsico (born November 8, 1957) is an American bassist and composer best known as the co-founder of the rock and roll band the Cruzados, formed in 1983, with two albums on Arista Records in 1985 and 1987. Prior to Cruzados, Marsico was a member of the Los Angeles punk band The Plugz (1980–1983), who were best known for scoring the motion picture Repo Man. Marsico has also recorded and toured with Bob Dylan, Neil Young, Marianne Faithfull, Roger Daltrey, Joe Ely, Willie Nelson, Linda Ronstadt, Dr. John, Susanna Hoffs, The Thorns, The DiVinyls, John Doe, Peter Case, Juliana Hatfield, Paul Jones, Rick Vito, and Barry Goldberg, among others. Marsico has co-written songs that appear in the motion picture Desperados. In addition, Marsico was the bassist for indie pop singer Matthew Sweet for over 10 years. Marsico recorded the soundtrack to the Oscar-winning film Session Man.

He has written four books: I'm Just Here for the Gig, Late Nights with Bob Dylan, Wild Things and King of Andalusia. Marsico has produced two motion pictures: Satan's Angel and Camp Burlesque.

Marsico leads his own jazz band, The Martini Kings, and has released 25 albums, with music appearing in HBO's Entourage and Six Feet Under. Marsico has acted in motion pictures, including Roadhouse, Georgia, Somebody to Love, LA Story and Static. In 2021 Marsico reformed his band Cruzados and released a new album titled She's Automatic, as well as the 2023 releases Dead Inside and Live from Marseille. Marsico has two children and lives in La Palma, California.
