= Chicano rock =

Rock music performed by Chicano groups

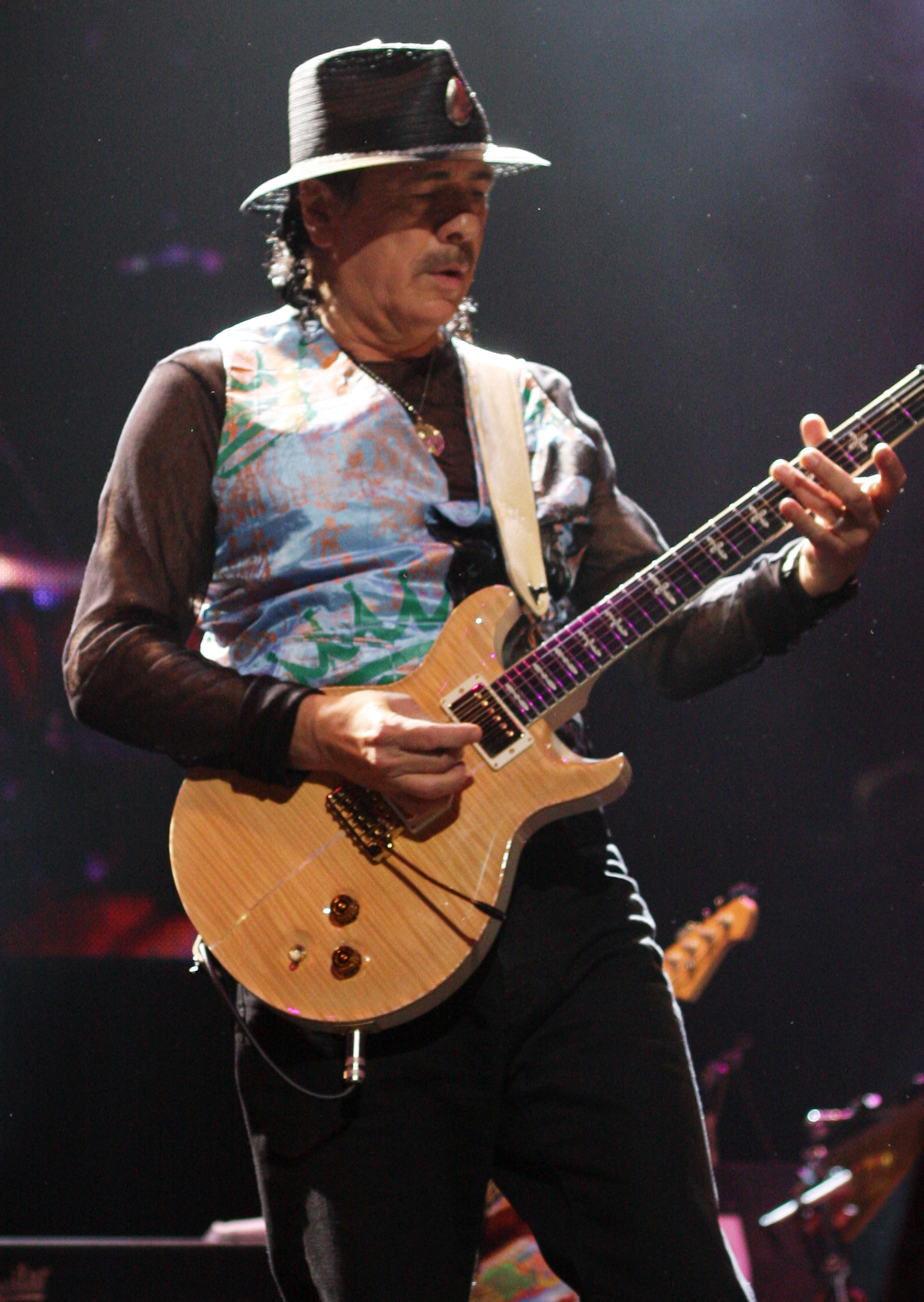
Iconic Chicano rock musician Carlos Santana

Chicano rock, also called Chicano fusion, is rock music performed by Mexican American (Chicano) groups or music with themes derived from Chicano culture. Chicano rock combines multiple music styles instead of one distinct sound. Some of these groups do not sing in Spanish at all nor use many specific Latin instruments or sounds. Chicano rock draws its identity from the cultural backgrounds of its performers and reflects a wide range of musical styles.

== Overview ==
There are three basic styles of Chicano rock.

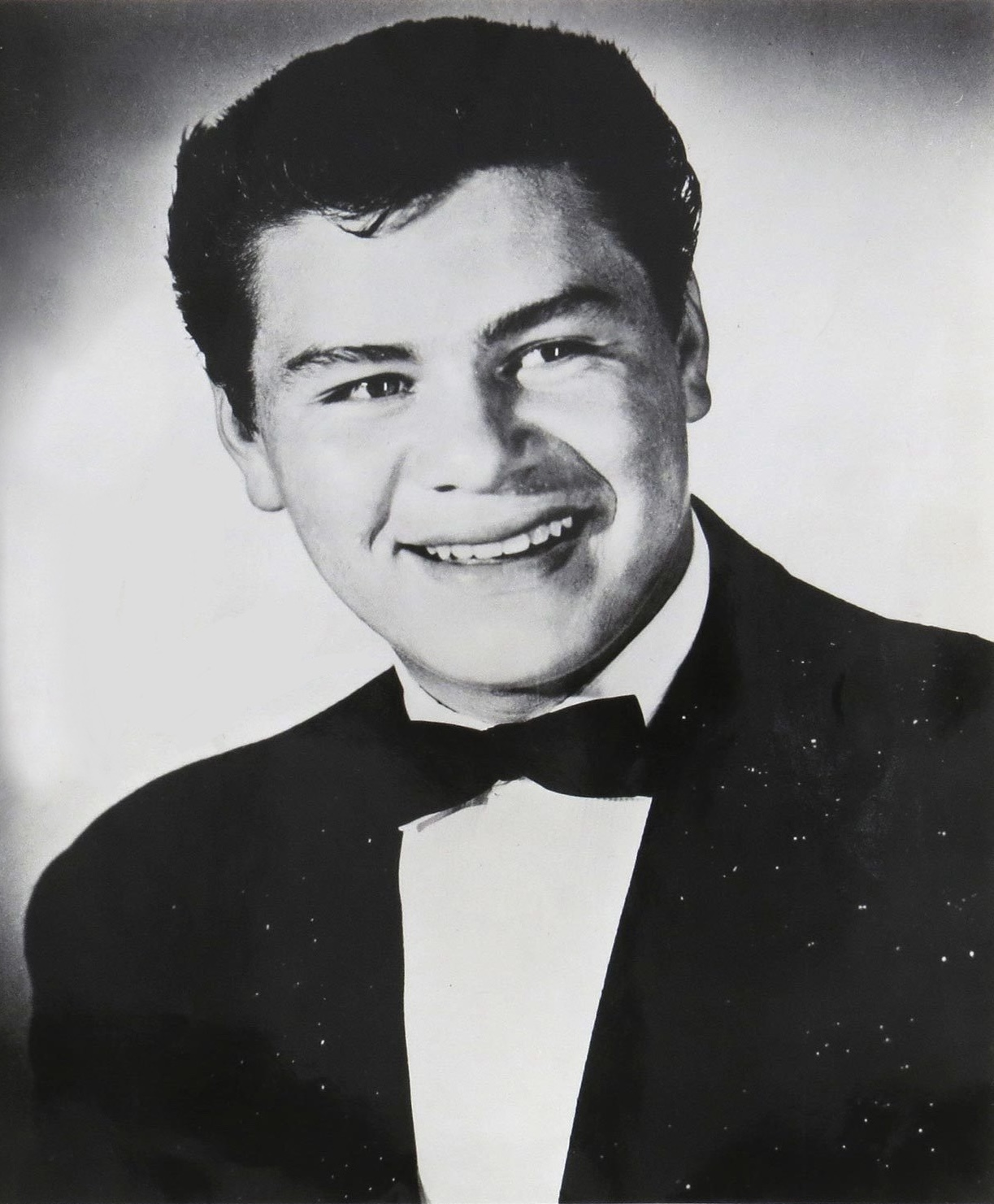
Ritchie Valens

1. The earliest Chicano rock emerged as a distinctive style of rock and roll performed by Mexican Americans from East Los Angeles and Southern California, containing themes from their cultural experience. Although the genre is broad and diverse, encompassing a variety of styles and subjects, the overarching theme of early Chicano rock is its rhythm and blues influence and incorporation of brass instruments like the saxophone and trumpet, Farfisa or Hammond B3 organ, funky basslines, and its blending of Mexican vocal styling sung in English.
  A tradition of 60s Chicano rock emerges from these origins, following a devotion to the original rhythm and blues, rockabilly and rock and roll. Artists like Ritchie Valens, Sunny & the Sunglows, The Sir Douglas Quintet, Cannibal & the Headhunters, The Premiers, Sam the Sham & the Pharaohs and Thee Midniters, all have made music that is heavily based on 1950s R&B, even when general trends moved away from the original sound of rock as time went by.
2. The second style of 70s Chicano rock is more open to blues music, soul music, R&B, rock music, funk, Latin music, salsa music, and jazz. Santana, Malo, War, El Chicano, Sapo and other Chicano 'Latin Rock' groups follow this approach with their fusions of R&B, jazz, and Caribbean sounds.
  Later Chicano musicians who draw from rockabilly and country include Linda Ronstadt and Los Lobos. These musicians also draw from traditions of Norteño music or Tejano music.
3. A third style is the 80s Latin rock, Latin R&B by Tierra, Little Joe, Little Willie G, Ralfi Pagan, Sheila E, Sugar Style, Sunny and the Sunliners and Rocky Padilla.

== History ==
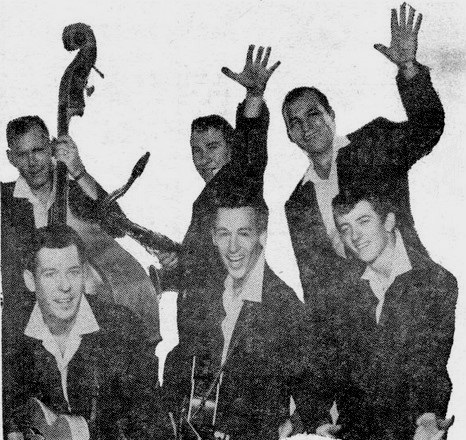
The Champs

In places such as San Antonio, Los Angeles, the San Francisco Bay area, and Dallas and Houston, Texas, the African-American audience was very important to aspiring Latino musicians, and this kept their music wedded to authentic R&B. DJ Dick Hugg (aka Huggie Boy) and radio station KRLA 1110 played a big role in promoting this music. Chicano rock music was also influenced by the Doo-wop genre, an example being the song "Angel Baby" by the Chicana fronted group Rosie and the Originals.

Don Tosti's Pachuco Boogie, recorded in 1948, was the first Chicano million-selling record, a swing tune featuring Spanish lyrics, using hipster slang called Calo. Lalo Guerrero arrived in Los Angeles in the late 1930s and found that L.A. was "bursting with ambition". Lalo and his friend captured their spirit in music by mixing swing and boogie-woogie in a cross-cultural, dialogue between African American, Anglo, and Mexican American influences.

The 1950s brought rhythm and blues and the roots of rock 'n' roll. The Mexican Americans were among the first to catch the beat and introduced a Latin flair to early rock music.

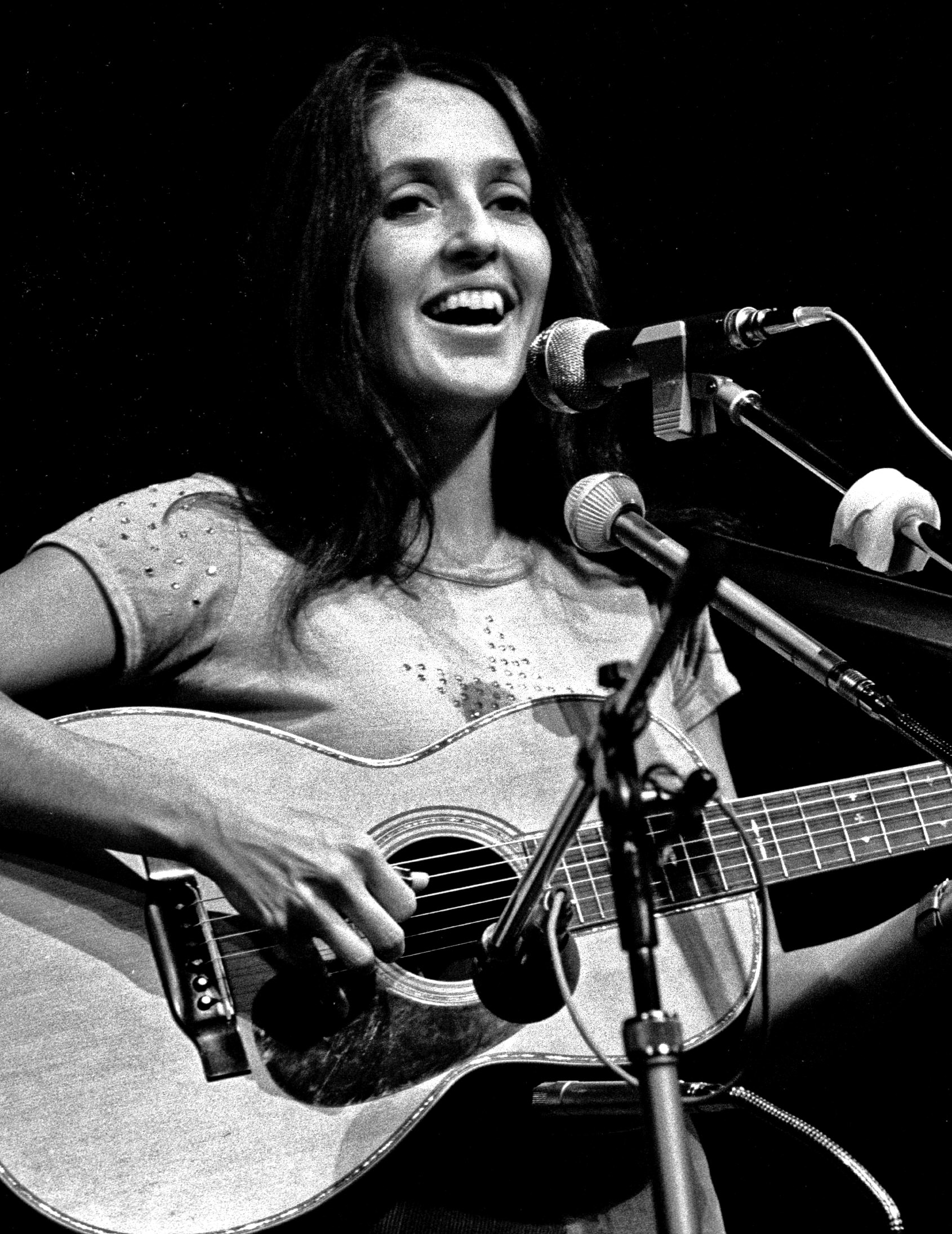
Joan Baez playing in Hamburg, 1973

Chicano rock 'n' roll star Ritchie Valens, was a Mexican-American singer and songwriter influential in the Chicano rock movement. He recorded numerous hits during his short career, most notably the 1958 hit "La Bamba." Valens died at age 17 in a plane crash with fellow musicians Buddy Holly and the Big Bopper on February 3, 1959. The tragedy was later immortalized as "The Day the Music Died" in the song "American Pie."

The 1958 hit song "Tequila!" was written and sung by the saxophone player Danny Flores (not to be confused with Danny David Flores, a former member of Renegade) and performed by The Champs. Flores, who died in September 2006, was known as the "Godfather of Latino Rock."

In the early to mid-1960s, Latin music was most welcoming to the American audience in the United States because of the popularity in genres like bossa nova, bugalú, mambo. At the same time, artists did not fit neatly into the narrow confines of early rock. Trini Lopez, an artist who found success in the folk scene blended folk and pop influences. He scored a major hit with "If I Had a Hammer" in 1963. He later recorded the traditional Mexican song "Corazón de Melón". In the mid-1960s, the British Invasion took over with bands like The Beatles and The Rolling Stones dominated charts and shifted public taste, and this is when Lopez's upbeat music began to seem outdated.

In the 60s, there was an explosion of Chicano rock bands in East Los Angeles and Texas. Sunny & the Sunglows produced several regional hits during the 1960s but is best remembered for its 1963 Number 11 Billboard hit "Talk to Me, Talk to Me". They hold the distinction of being the first all-Mexican American group featured on American Bandstand. Their versions of "Rags to Riches" (Tony Bennett) and "Out of Sight-Out of Mind" (The Five Keys) also reached the Billboard Hot 100. Another group to appear on American Bandstand as well as open for The Rolling Stones, was The Premiers with their hit rendition of a Don and Dewey song called "Farmer John". It featured the beat from the popular hit, Louie, Louie, which was in turn based on a Latino song, El Loco Cha Cha. Richard Berry, credited with writing Louie, Louie, drew inspiration to record the song after listening to an R&B rendition of El Loco Cha Cha performed by the Latin R&B group 'Rhythm Rockers' led by Mexican-Filipino American brothers, Rick and Barry Rillera. The Rillera brothers would go on to record and perform with The Righteous Brothers.

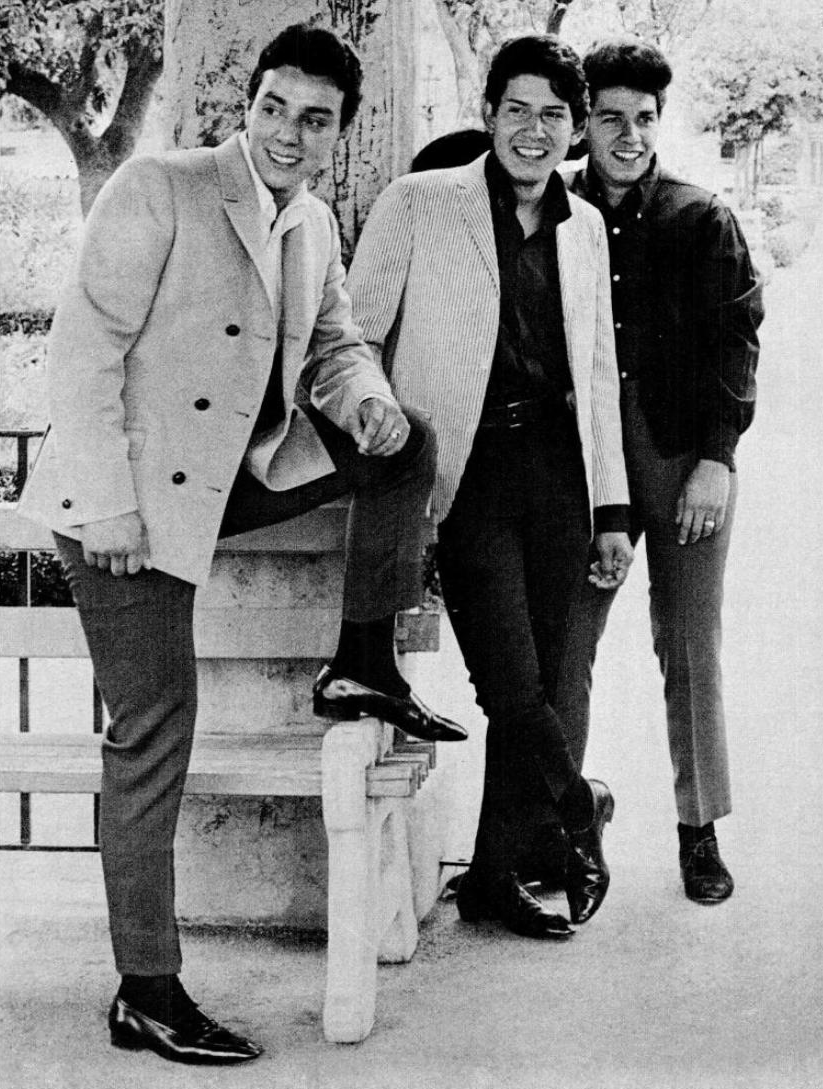
Trade ad for Cannibal & the Headhunters's single "Land of a Thousand Dances"

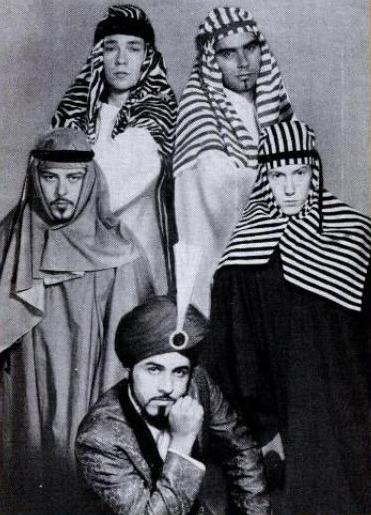
Sam the Sham

The British Invasion challenged all American musicians, not just Chicanos. East Los Angeles witnessed a surge of creativity, and a renaissance of art, music and politics. Leading the way in music was the band Cannibal & the Headhunters, composed of five young men from the projects who recorded a national hit, "Land of a Thousand Dances", and almost overnight found themselves opening for the Beatles on the British superstars' 1965 tour. That same year, Thee Midniters hit the charts with "Whittier Blvd.", an anthem to East Los Angeles' most famous street, the home of a late-night cruising scene that expressed the California car culture that Mexican Americans were making their own. Also in 1965, the Chicano led Sam the Sham and The Pharaohs released the international hit "Wooly Bully" which would go on to sell three million copies. Penned by frontman Domingo "Sam" Samudio, it holds the distinction of being the first American record to sell a million copies during the British Invasion era. In 1966, the Mexican American garage band ? and the Mysterians scored a number one hit with the song "96 Tears". The Sir Douglas Quintet is said to have made the most 'English' sounding American music of the Beatlemania period (actually since the English were playing music that was more rooted in R&B than many white Americans of that time, the quintet were actually sounding 'English' by keeping to an all-American R&B/Country sound). Indeed, producer Huey P. Meaux put the Sir in the group's name to emphasize the connection, but that was more a marketing decision than a musical one. The Sir Douglas Quintet was from central Texas, and some of its members were Latinos. The group's lead singer, Doug Sahm, was not of Mexican descent. Sahm was so thoroughly immersed in Tejano culture, that he later recorded an album under the name Doug Saldaña. Despite the musician's efforts to make the group appear to have emerged from the British Invasion, scholars have noted that the group's clear Tejano influences and accordion based slowed down polka rhythms give the band a Chicano rock title.

In the late 1960s and 1970s, when civil rights and the Vietnam War were compelling issues, young Mexican Americans proudly called themselves Chicanos—which was once considered as a derogatory term—and many took to the streets to stand up for their rights. Chicano duo Cheech and Chong released novelty single "Basketball Jones" (1973) and hit "Earache My Eye" (1974). Bands like El Chicano, Malo, Azteca, Tierra, and Sapo (1974) created new music that "said something" about Chicano heritage and their struggles for equality and justice. In the midst of these events, Mexican-American immigrants of East L.A. were being exposed to cultural identity problems and struggles with assimilation. Chicano musicians developed a rock sound that reached mainstream audiences and was recognized for its impact on American music. They aim to pay homage to their native culture and capture the unique Chicano experience. Chicano rockers blended Mexican and American musical influences, creating a cross-cultural sound that reflected their cultural backgrounds.

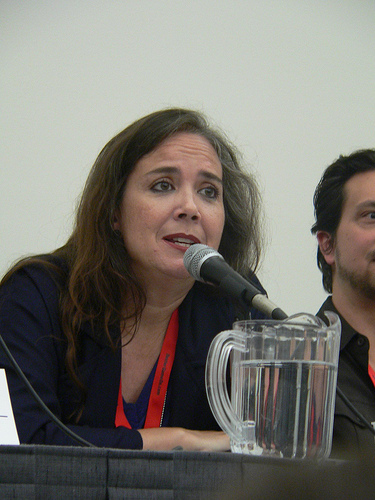
Lisa Coleman

The trend of Chicano rock mirrored what was happening on college campuses as well. The rise of Chicano Studies departments, which offered courses in Chicano literature, politics and culture, affected college students and musicians tremendously. Musicians rebelled against the "old world" and adopt the Mexican and Latin American styles in their own music.

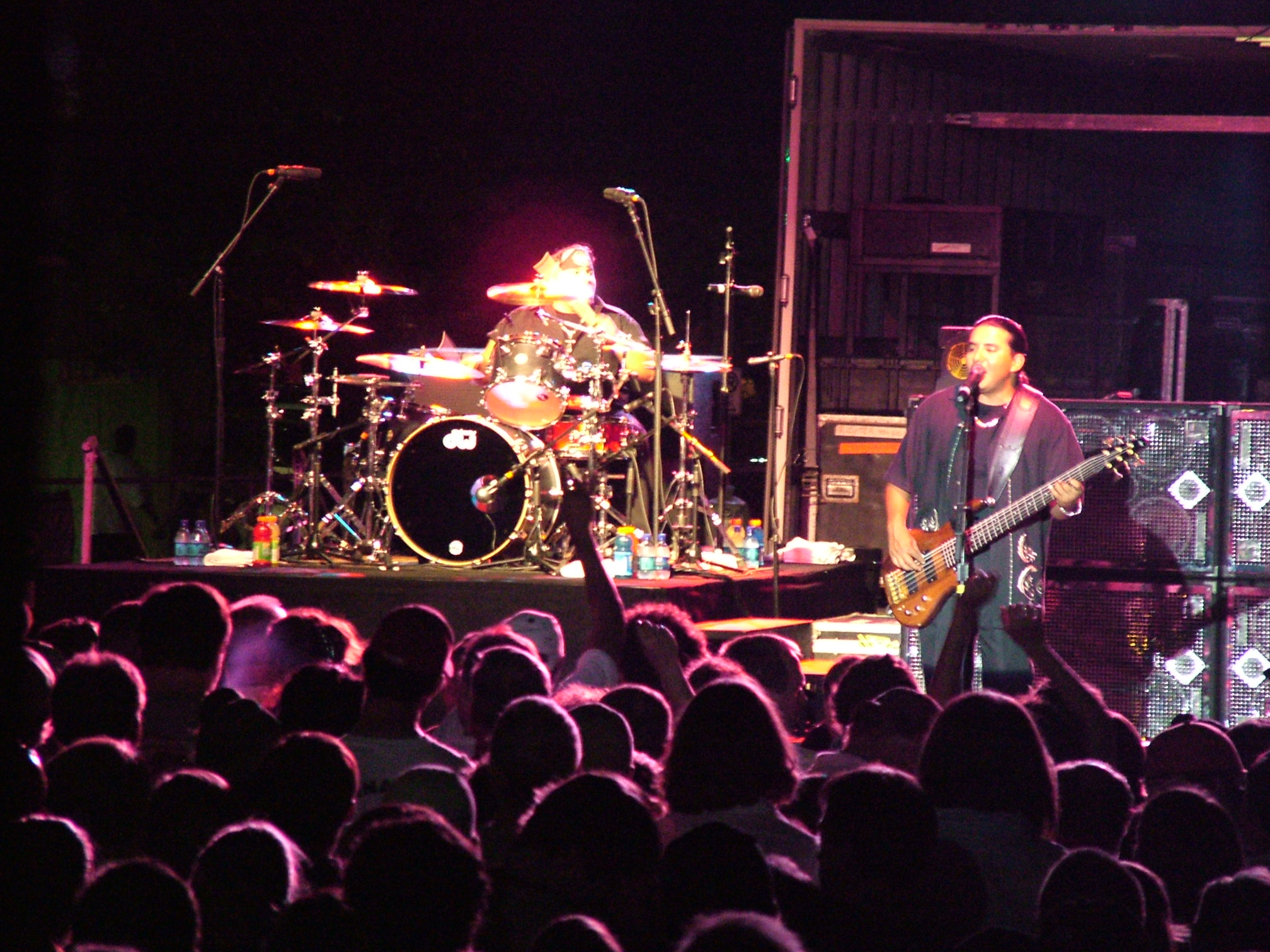
Los Lonely Boys

Along with visual artists, activists, and audiences, the musicians of the East Los Angeles Chicano rock scene form an emergent cultural movement that speaks powerfully to present conditions. The Chicano rock scene of East Los Angeles serves as a form of unity for radical Chicanos who wish to bring forth a call to action and a site for resistance through their art. By claiming the musical style of the "old world", Chicanos are reclaiming their indigenous identity and undoing Spanish colonialism.

The Eastside scenes formed out of a variety of backgrounds and demonstrated a commitment to political activism and coalition building, producing a variety of social and cultural activities. The musical practices of the East L.A. scene bring to the discussion the dislocations and displacements of people of color in urban California, but they also reflect the emergence of new forms of resistance that find counterhegemonic possibilities within contradictions.

Linda Ronstadt is a versatile singer who traversed multiple genres. She gained national hits such as "You're No Good" (1975), "It's So Easy", "Blue Bayou" (1977), "Back in the USA" (1978), and "Hurt So Bad" (1980) in the 1970s and '80s. Ronstadt was nurtured by her Mexican American family whose musical roots run deep in the Mexican border region of Tucson, Arizona. Ronstadt holds dear the memory of childhood serenades by "The Father of Chicano Rock," Lalo Guerrero, a close family friend. Ronstadt's great-aunt Luisa Espinel gained international popularity interpreting Spanish and Mexican song and dance in the 1930s. Among the most popular female pop singers, Ronstadt has been described as an influential Chicana musician, with scholars noting her extensive discography and career spanning over forty years.

== Chicano rock 1980s ==
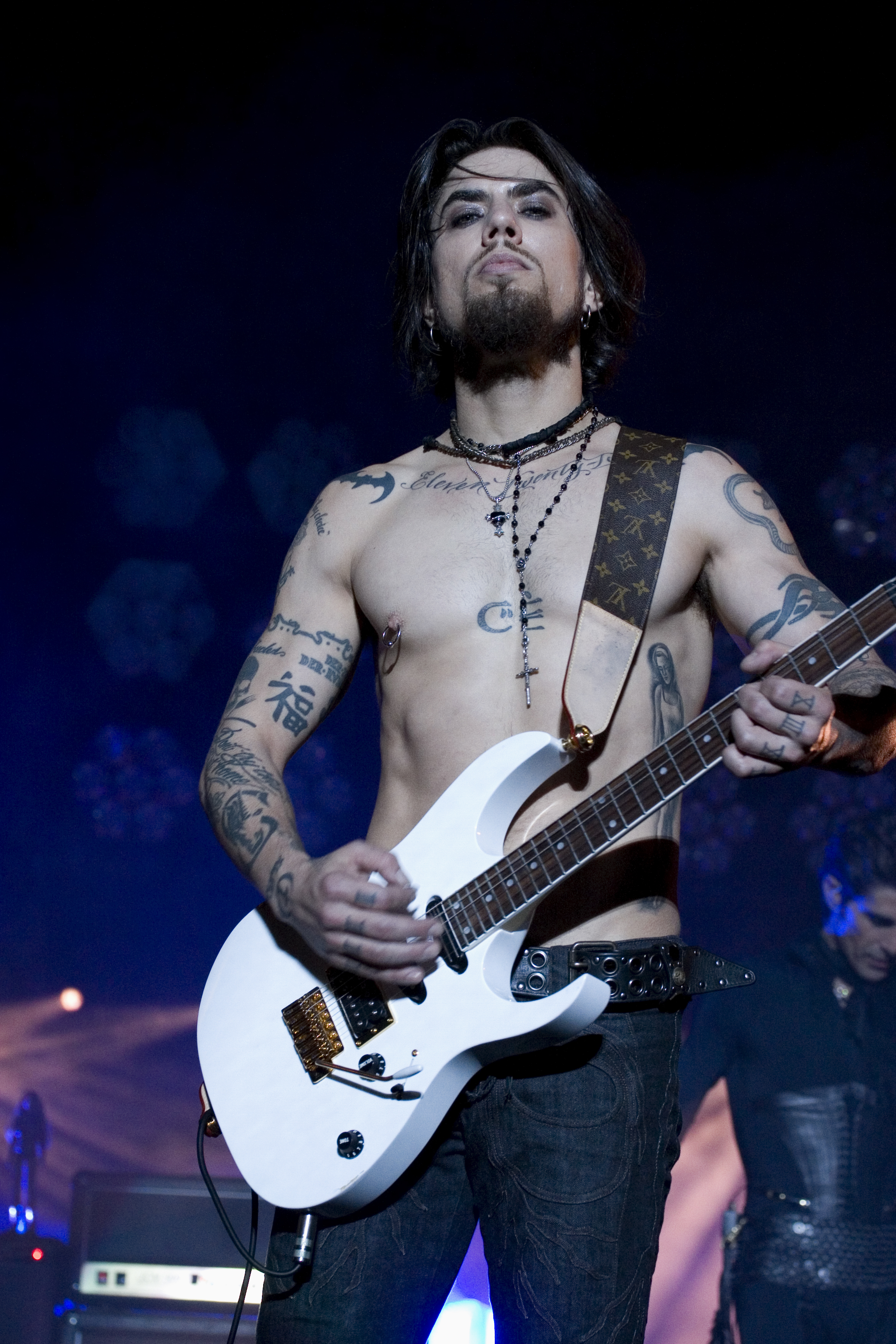
Dave Navarro

In the 1980s, Tierra gained TOP 40 hit "Together", and Cheech and Chong recorded "Born In East LA". Maldita Vecindad is a rock en Español band whose music is a mixture of punk, rap, ska, funk, and Latin. They were formed in Mexico City in 1985 and describe themselves as a mambo punk combo. They influenced other Chicano rock bands and Chicano music because they were among the first Mexican rock musicians to express a kindred spirit with the Chicano movement. On their early recordings, Maldita Vecindad y Los Hijos del Quinto Patio (BMG Ariola 1989) and Circo (BMG Ariola 1991), Maldita's music delved into Chicano culture with songs such as "Mojado," "Pachuco," and "Pata de Perro." In addition to the two albums above, Maldita Vecindad released "Baile de Máscaras" (1996), "Monstros" (1998), and "Greatest Hits + Rarities 1989–1999" (2000).

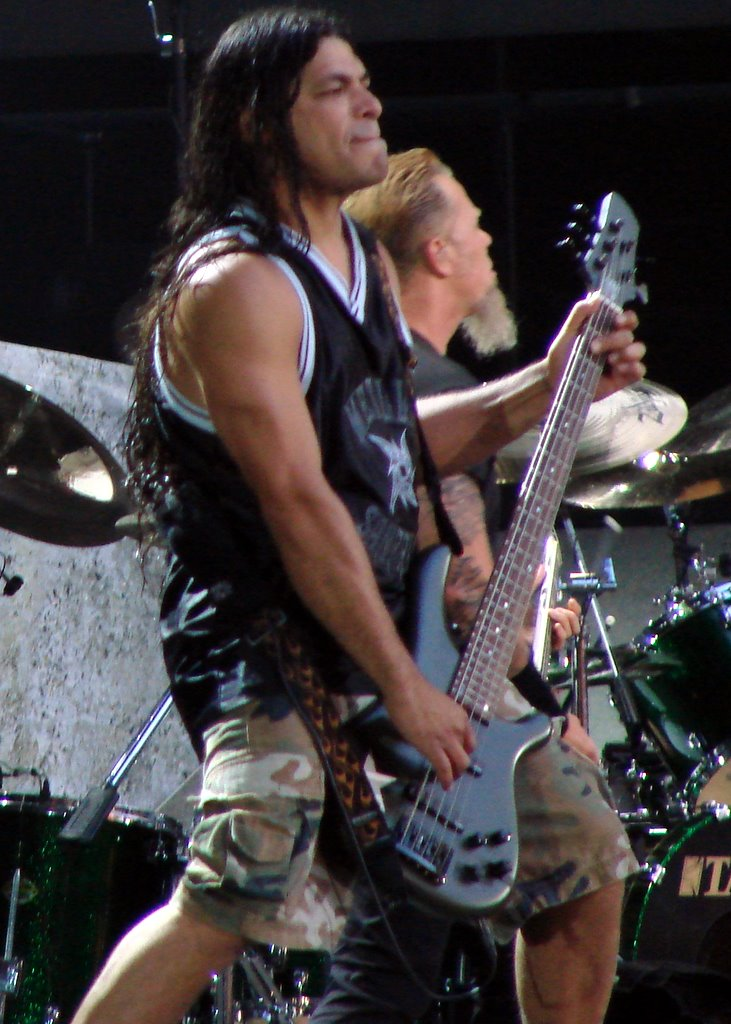
Robert Trujillo bassist of the American heavy metal band Metallica since 2003. He was also a member of crossover thrash band Suicidal Tendencies, funk metal supergroup Infectious Grooves, heavy metal band Black Label Society, and has worked with Jerry Cantrell and Ozzy Osbourne.

In the mid-1980s Chicano teen rock band Renegade landed on the international music scene, sporting a combination of heavy metal instrumentation with more pop-oriented melodies, resulting in a new subgenre, termed "commercial metal". The four teens—Kenny Marquez on lead guitar and vocals, Luis Cardenas on drums and vocals, Tony De La Rosa on rhythm guitar and vocals and Danny David Flores on bass guitar and vocals—have been referred to as Chicano rock gods, amongst Mexican Americans. Renegade or Los Renegados as they are called in Latin America, went on to sell more than 30 million units worldwide, with a series of hits in Mexico, Canada, Japan and the United Kingdom, and to a lesser extent, the United States.

Subsequently, groups like 90s band Ozomatli and Quetzal had led the new wave of Latin Rock groups that fuse multiple musical genres.

Ozomatli mixes rock, hip-hop, funk music, and cumbia. Their song "City of Angels", presented a new eclectic form of Latino rock.

Quetzal, the band from the barrios of East Los Angeles has been creating Latin folk and roots-rock music for over a decade. With the successful tours and concerts alongside Los Lobos, Ozomatli, Taj Mahal and Michelle Shocked, Quetzal has played intimate clubs and large arenas alike. The band combines rock, Afro-Cuban, country blues, and jazz elements to support the wide-ranging, bilingual vocals of Martha González. The retro-futuristic mix has garnered praise from critics including the LA Times and Los Lobos. Quetzal simultaneously forges a sound that makes you dance and contemplate change.

Robert Lopez, also known as El Vez, started operating an art gallery called "La Luz de Jesus" and created a show dedicated to Elvis. Since Lopez's impersonator did not meet his expectation, El Vez was created. El Vez's first performance was in Memphis, Tennessee on August 16, 1989. Lopez began making karaoke tapes while running his gallery. While not including "sacred" topics directly, his goal is to blur the line between what is sacred and profane allowing him to have wide age range in his audience. He has been releasing albums since 1994 continuing to use satire and humor in his songs to express revolutionary views. As his lyrics are historical, some teachers and professors use his music to teach history and Mexican American Culture.

== Chicano/Latino punk ==
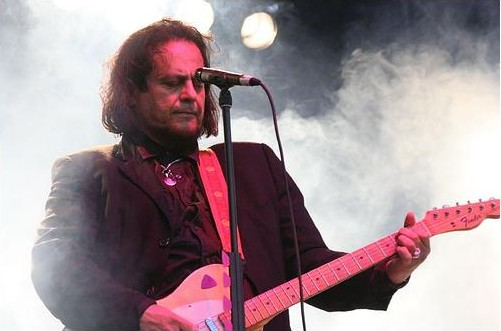
Tito Larriva, September 2007

Chicano punk is a branch of Chicano rock with bands like The Zeros, The Stains, The Plugz, The Bags, Thee Undertakers, Nervous Gender, The Brat, The Gun Club, Los Illegals, Los Angelinos, Felix and the Katz, Odd Squad, Union 13, and The Cruzados coming out of the punk scene in Los Angeles. The rock band ? and the Mysterians, made up of Hispanic American musicians from Bay City and Saginaw, Michigan, were the first band to be described as "punk rock." The term punk rock was reportedly coined in 1971 by rock critic Dave Marsh in a review of their show for Creem magazine. Recent Chicano punk bands include Rayos X, Tuberculosis, Mata Mata, Mugre, Venganza and Asko from southern California, La Grita and La Plebe from Northern California, as well as Los Crudos from Chicago.

In 1992 Mia Zapata and her punk rock group The Gits released Frenching the Bully, their first album, on C/Z Records. The group members met one another and formed the band in Yellow Springs, Ohio during the mid-1980s. Their music quickly became popular throughout the area and on the Antioch College campus. Band member Moriarty describes punk rock as a combination of emotion, temperament, rage and music. The Gits moved from Ohio to San Francisco and finally to Seattle, but not because of the up-and-coming music scene. Moriarty explains that "the idea was to just go up and pour your guts out" and to play their music and express their emotion. The group dissolved after Mia Zapata was murdered on July 7, 1993 by Jesus Mezquia. The remaining members went on to team up with Joan Jett to issue the album Zapata's death had interrupted. Proceeds from the album, titled Evil Stig (Gits Live spelled backwards) went to fund an investigator into Zapata's death, which had become a cold case.

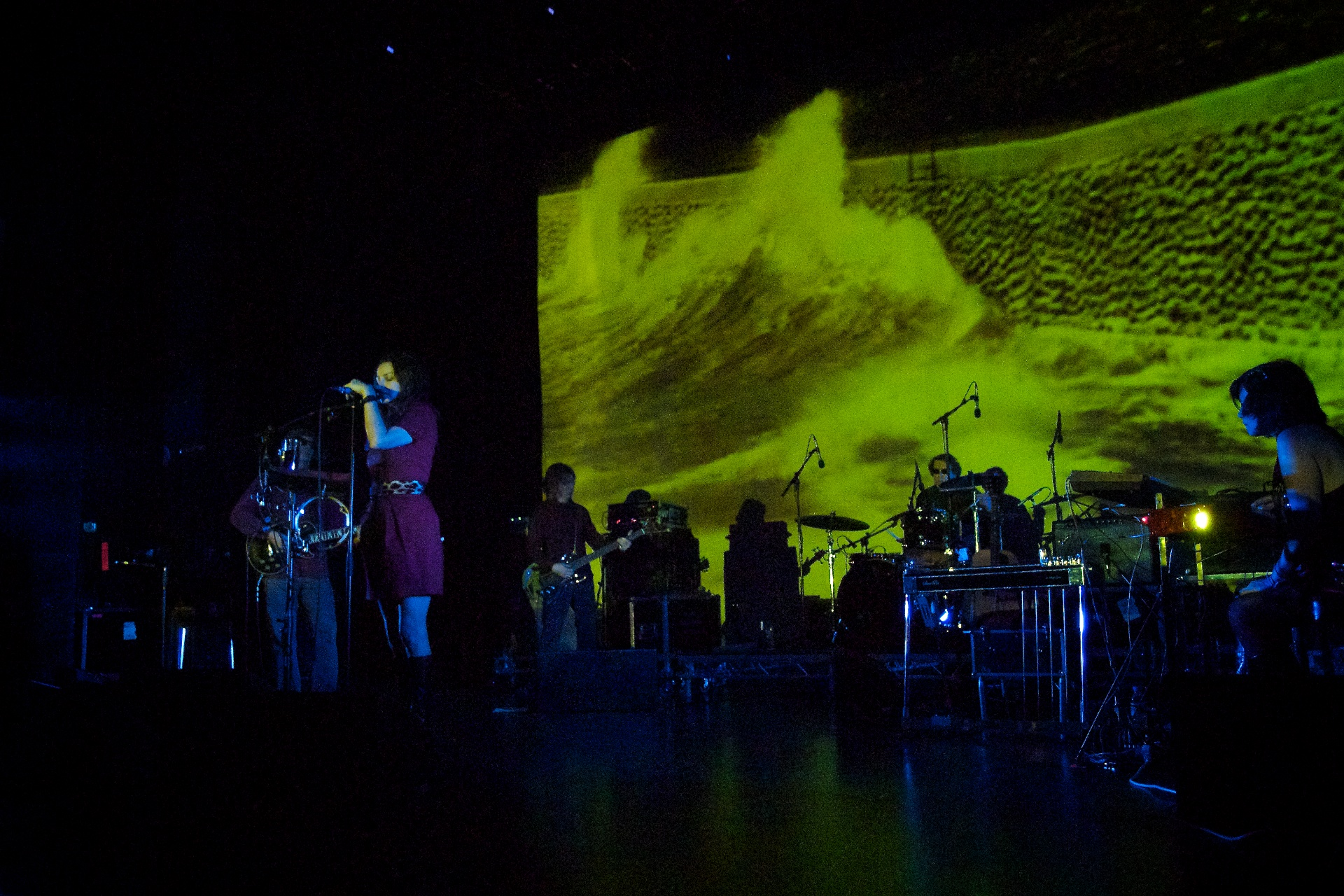
Hope Sandoval lead singer of Mazzy Star

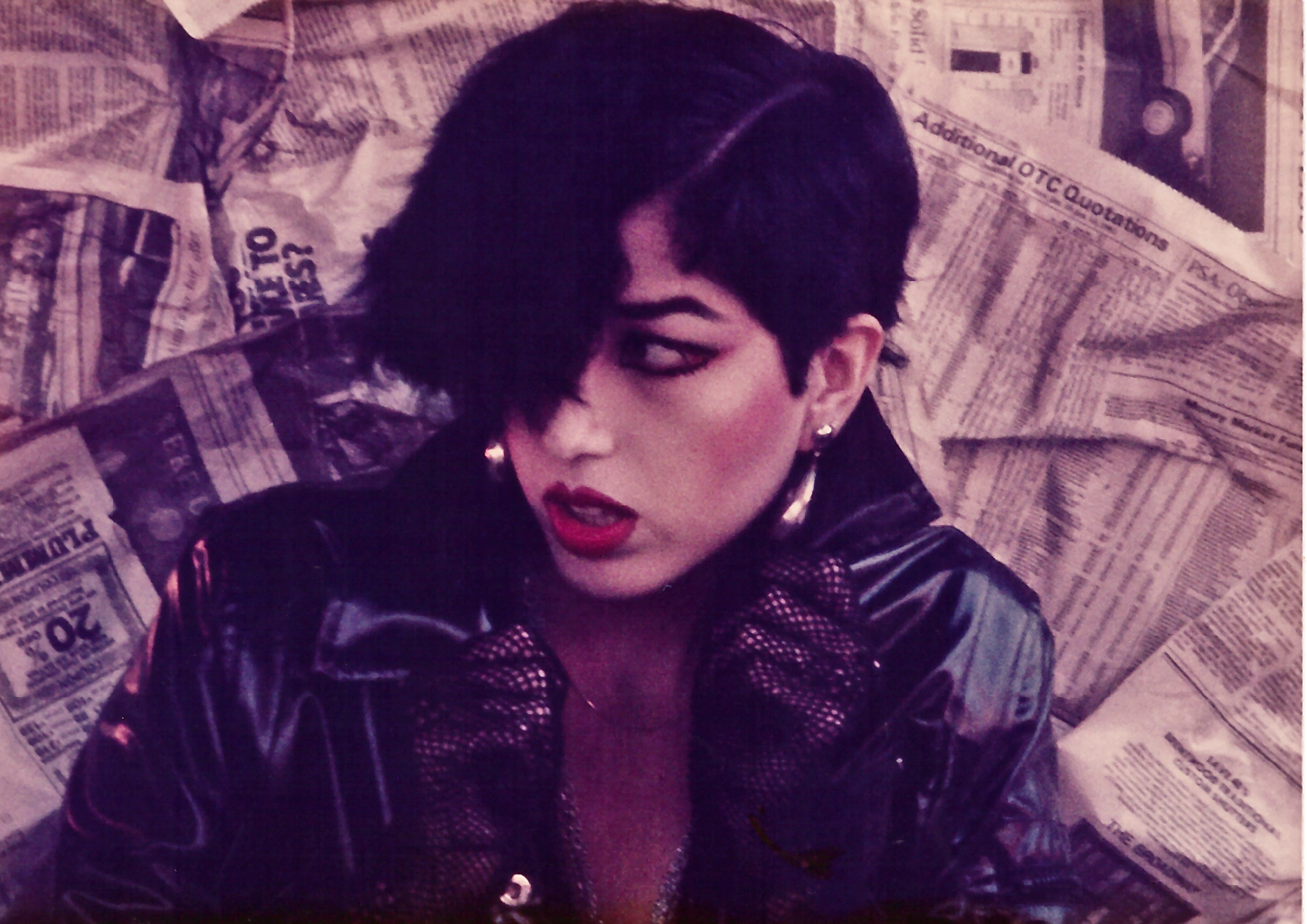
Alice Bag in the 80s

Many Chicanas became "Punkeras" and have contributed to the artistic conditions of production, gender relationship, and the punk aesthetic that existed in the late 1970s and 1980s. The D-I-Y sensibility at the core of punk musical subcultures found resonance with the practice of Rasquache, a Chicano cultural practice of "making do" with limited resources. In fact, young Chicanas had historically been at the forefront of formulating stylized social statements via the fashion and youth subculture, beginning with the Pachucos and continuing with Chicana Mods in the 1960s. Punk's critique of the status quo, poverty, sexuality, class inequalities, and war spoke directly to working class East Los Angeles youth.

Alice Bag is an example of a punkera that typifies the punk scene of the late 1970s. Born as Alicia Armendariz, she went by Alice Bag (also Alice Phallus, and Alice Douchbag) as her stage name. Armendariz's Chicana experience influenced her music career as projected her unrelenting emotions through her punk music. Her music reflects an accumulated rage from being made fun of for not speaking proper English and having to witness domestic violence at a young age. She used her painful childhood experience as empowerment in the male-dominated field of punk rock with her female lead band, Bags. Alice and The Bags are known to be responsible for "co-creating the first wave of California punk alongside the likes of Black Flag, X, the Germs, Phranc (then in Catholic Discipline), and women that came to be known as the Go-Go's."

== Chicano rock, 1990s–present ==
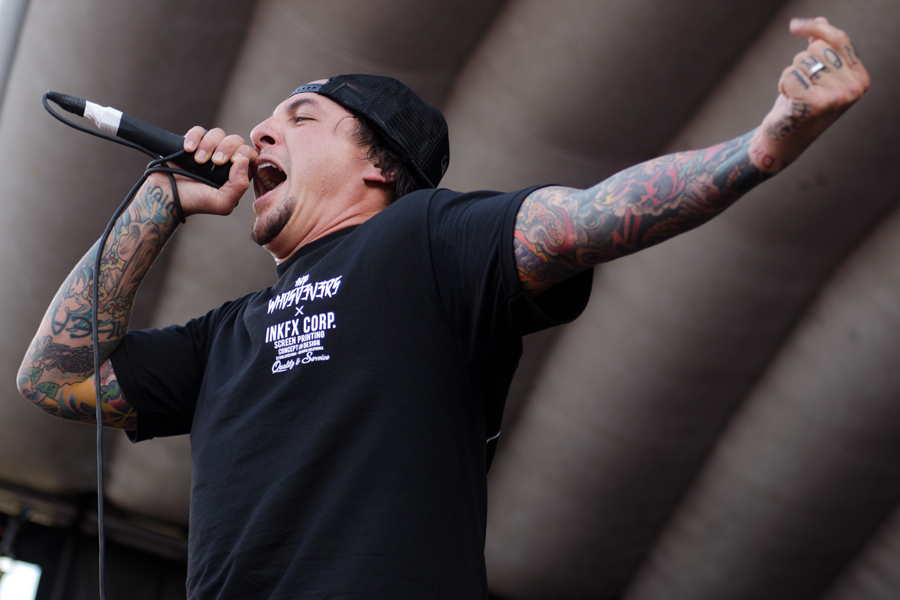
Sonny Sandoval of P.O.D. at Uproar Festival 2012. Over the course of their career, the band has received three Grammy Award nominations.

Many popular Chicano and Chicano-led rock bands began to emerge during the mid and late 90s such as P.O.D., Los Lonely Boys, MxPx, Adema, Downset, Spineshank, At the Drive-In, Fenix TX, Ünloco, Union 13, Voodoo Glow Skulls, Ozomatli, The Latin Soul Syndicate, and El Vez, the "Mexican Elvis." In the early 2000s the progressive Latin-influenced rock band The Mars Volta came onto the scene.

Modern age Chicana punk rock band, Girl in a Coma, express their Chicana experience through their music and artistic expression. Girl in a Coma consists of three members, the two sisters, Nina Diaz, Phanie Diaz and their long time friend, Jenn Alva. Although they claim that they do not consider themselves to be a Latin rock group due to their lack of Spanish speaking fluency, it can't be denied that they are a reflection of the Chicana experience. Furthermore, their inability to speak Spanish fluently did not restrict them from releasing their album, "Trio B.C" that plays tribute to the sisters' grandfather's tejano band in which they recorded the last track, "Ven Cera", completely in Spanish. Girl in a Coma are the modern Chicana punkeras that have already picked up quite the large audience since their 2007 debut with their "all-American" punk rock feel. Although, the Latin undertones of their roots are not prominent in their current records, there is a possibility that they will be in their future records as Nina Diaz has stated that she's been trying to learn Spanish here and there but it is in her plans to someday write an album completely in Spanish.

In the 2020s, a new generation of Chicano rock artists, influenced by bands such as Cafe Tacuba and Tame Impala, have incorporated alternative rock elements into regional Mexican-style music. Ivan Cornejo, for example, first gained prominence for his "indie Sierreño" style of music.

== Cultural politics of Chicano rock ==
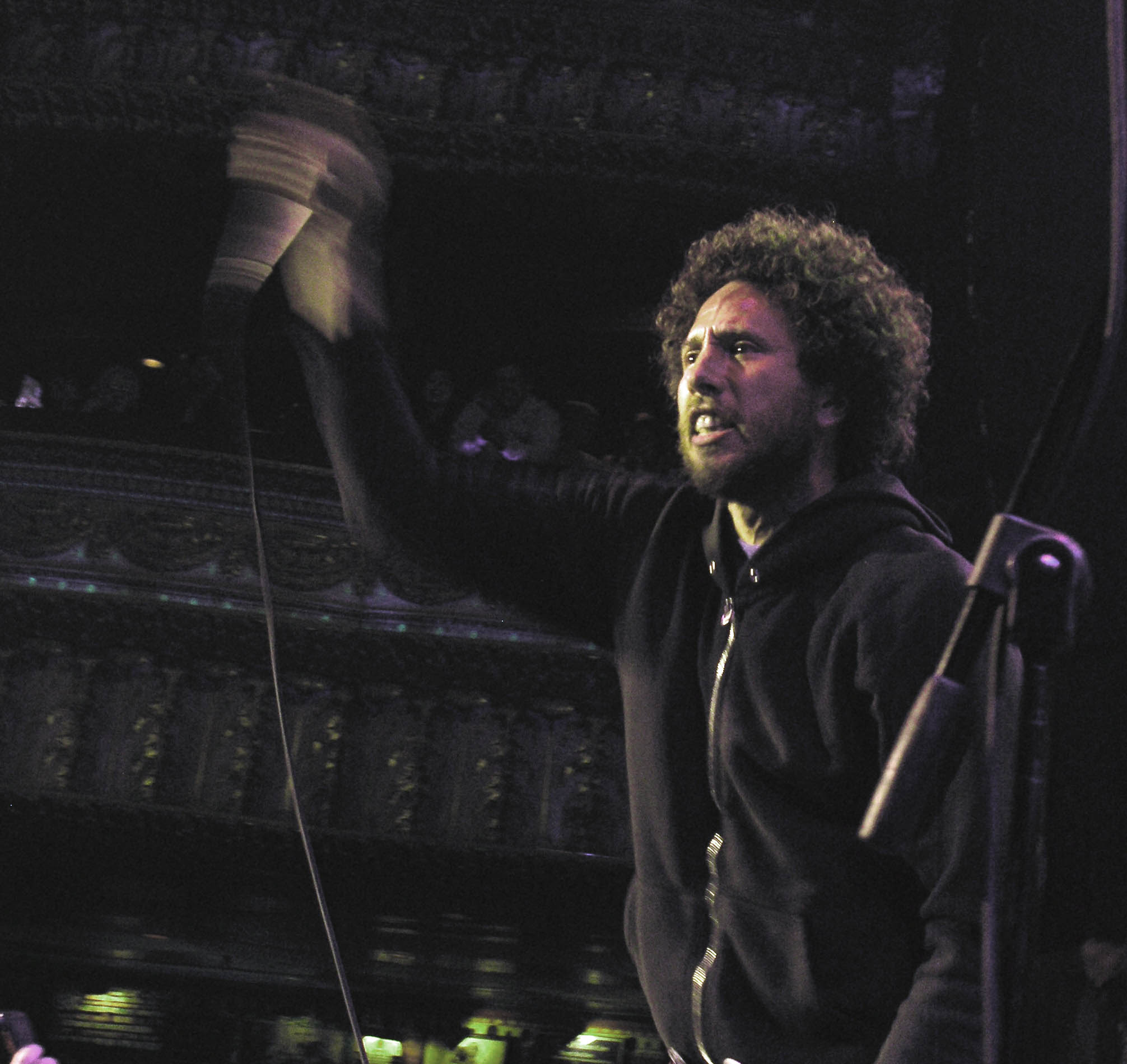
Zack de la Rocha on stage with Rage Against the Machine in 2007.

Zacharias Manuel de la Rocha is an activist is best known as the vocalist and lyricist of rock band Rage Against the Machine. Rage Against the Machine songs express revolutionary political views. As of 2010, they had sold over 16 million records worldwide. Chicano rock music is being led by a wave of socially and politically active Latin-fusion bands that emerged and gained popularity in the 1990s such as Aztlan Underground, Ozomatli, Lysa Flores, Quinto Sol and more. Their music in general pulls from other genres (soul, samba, reggae, and rap) and utilizes multilingual lyrics (in Spanish, English and Nahuatl) and takes themes like urban exile, indigenous identity and multiracial unity and layers them in order to put into the spotlight important social issues. These artists in particular have been exceptionally successful due to the millions of Latinos in Los Angeles, California that are bilingual/bicultural. One of the larger purposes of the music is to draw attention to "present conditions of oppression and disenfranchisement" in the East L.A. scene, and to provide a form of political possibility to those who are less powerful (financially, socially, etc.).

The Alacranes' frontman, Ramón "Chunky" Sánchez, once said that Chicano rock lies "somewhere between Pedro Infante and the Rolling Stones." This categorization, or lack-thereof, by Sánchez demonstrates that Chicano rock is defined by an identity rather than a musical style.

== Chicano rock as a global phenomenon ==
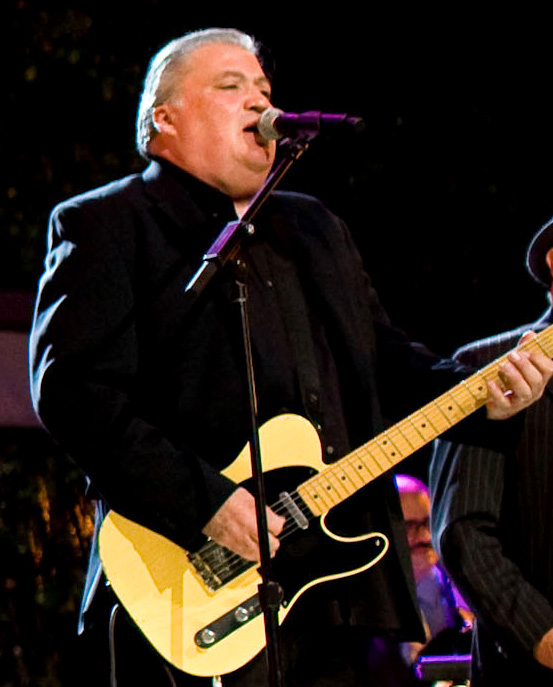
David Hidalgo performing with Los Lobos on the South Lawn of the White House, October 13, 2009.

Chicano rock's origins in diverse places like Los Angeles and San Francisco requires us to consider the many cultures that went into its creation. Shared experiences of discrimination have led black and Latinx communities to build what George Lipsitz called "a 'historical bloc' of oppositional groups united in ideas and intentions if not experience." A shared experience in America amongst members of Lipsitz's "historical bloc" led to cultural, and musical, fusion that transcends national borders. Jesus Velo of 1970s Chicano punk band, Los Illegals, has said "We [had] no choice but to just absorb each other's rhythms and patterns." Through this fusion, international musical styles mixed with American rock to create something novel and multicultural. Mexican-American artists' music in this era has been labelled 'Chicano rock.' Scholars note that Chicano rock helped create a distinct Mexican-American identity, but this includes elements of other Latin American nations.

Additionally, Latin American nations' musical styles were not developed in isolation. Loza writes, "Latin America must be considered a cultural entity much like that of other continental areas––for example, the United States, Europe and East Asia––where intercultural expression ultimately signifies various national identities and 'characters'." Latin American nations are built on a mix of indigenous, colonist, and African peoples, and their music reflects contributions from these different cultures.

Chicano rock continues to be present in the work of artists across a variety of genres, from alternative rock to hip-hop, with its connections that reflects the ongoing connection between Mexican American identity and modern popular music.

== See also ==
- Tex-Mex music
- Brown-eyed soul
- G Funk
- Chicano rap
- El Chicano
- Boogaloo
