= List of Uruguayan Americans =

This is a list of notable Uruguayan Americans, including both original immigrants who obtained American citizenship and their American descendants.

To be included in this list, the person must have a Wikipedia article showing they are Uruguayan American or must have references showing they are Uruguayan American and are notable.

== List ==
- Fede Álvarez (born 1978 in Montevideo) - filmmaker.
- Gisele Ben-Dor (born 1955 in Uruguay) - American-Israeli orchestra conductor
- Juan José Calandria (1902–1980) - painter and sculptor
- Luis Camnitzer (born 1937 in Lübeck, raised in Uruguay) - artist and academic
- Jaime Carbonell (1953–2020) - computer scientist
- Natalia Cigliuti (born 1978 in Montevideo) - actress
- Fernando Clavijo (born 1956 in Maldonado, died 2019 in Fort Lauderdale) - footballer/soccer player
- Hiber Conteris (1933–2020) - writer, playwright, literary critic
- David Cruz Thayne (born 1971 in Manchester, NH) - businessman
- George Davidsohn (born 1936 in Montevideo, died 2015 in New York City) - entrepreneur
- Miguel del Aguila - Uruguayan-born multiple Grammy nominated American composer
- Graciana del Castillo - Uruguayan-born economist and international strategist
- Jonathan Del Arco (born 1966 in Uruguay) - actor and LGBT activist
- George DelHoyo (born 1953 in Canelones) - also known as George Deloy, actor
- José L. Duomarco (1905–1985) - medical scientist
- Carlos Eduardo Espina (born 1998 in Montevideo) - activist
- Fernando Espuelas (born 1966 in Montevideo) - entrepreneur, author, media personality and philanthropist
- Diego Fagundez (born 1995 in Montevideo) - professional footballer for the New England Revolution of Major League Soccer
- Francisco Fattoruso (born 1979 in Las Vegas, Nevada) - musician, son of Hugo Fattoruso
- Cirilo “Pepe” Fernández (born 1943 in Uruguay) - former soccer forward, current soccer businessman
- Bruno Fonseca (born 1958 in New York, died 1994 in East Hampton) - artist
- Caio Fonseca (born 1959 in New York) - painter, brother of Bruno Fonseca
- Isabel Fonseca (born 1961 in New York) - writer
- Rodolfo Gambini (born 1946 in Montevideo) - physicist and professor, working on loop quantum gravity
- Jorge Gestoso (born 1951 in Montevideo) - journalist and news anchor at CNN
- Enrique Graf (born 1953 in Montevideo) - musician
- Sebastián Guenzatti (born 1991 in Montevideo) - footballer
- Gabriela Hearst (born 1976) - fashion designer
- Sampson Lewkowicz (born 1951 in Montevideo) - boxing promoter and manager
- Ricardo López (1975–1996) - also known as the "Björk stalker", pest control officer who attempted to kill musician Björk
- Jorge Majfud (born 1969 in Tacuarembó) - writer, professor at Jacksonville University
- Emir Rodríguez Monegal (1921–1985) - scholar, literary critic, writer, professor of Latin American contemporary literature at Yale University
- Joseph Jacinto "Jo" Mora (1876–1947) - cartoonist and artist
- Adrián Nario "El Bananero" (born 1976) - humorist, producer and Internet celebrity
- Martín Núñez (born 1987 in Montevideo) - footballer currently playing for Minnesota Stars FC in the North American Soccer League.
- Jorge Ottati Junior (born in Montevideo) - television and radio sports announcer at beIN SPORTS
- Pedro Piedrabuena (born 1971 in Montevideo) - professional three-cushion billiards player
- Daniel Pontet (born 1957 in Montevideo) - artist
- Jorge Ramos (born in Montevideo) - sports commentator at ESPN
- Tab Ramos (born 1966 in Montevideo) - former footballer/soccer player, whom also served as co-assistant to U.S. team manager Bob Bradley from 2007 to 2011
- Rodrigo Santiago (born 1990 in Montevideo) - footballer
- Gabe Saporta (born 1979 in Montevideo) - vocalist of bands Midtown and Cobra Starship
- José Serebrier (born 1938 in Montevideo) - conductor and composer
- Pedro Sevcec (born 1950 in Montevideo) - television reporter who works for America TV / Miami in the United States
- Martin Sorrondeguy - singer of bands Los Crudos and Limp Wrist, the founder of Lengua Armada Discos, documentary film director
- Miguel Terekhov (1928–2012) - ballet dancer and ballet instructor
- Carlos A. Vegh (born 1958 in Montevideo) - academic economist and Professor of Economics at the University of Maryland, son of former Finance Minister Alejandro Végh Villegas
- Agustín Viana (born 1983 in Chicago) - professional footballer
- Rafael Viñoly (1944-2023) - architect
- Ida Vitale (born 1923 in Montevideo) - prolific writer who played an important role in the Uruguayan art movement "Generation of 1945".
- Adrian Vallarino - TV and film producer and director
- Gabriel Wilensky (born 1964 in Uruguay) - software developer, entrepreneur, and historian of the Holocaust
- Alejandro Zaffaroni (1923–2014) - biotechnological entrepreneur
