= Uruguayan Americans =

Americans of Uruguayan birth or descent

Total population
- 60,013 (2018)

Regions with significant populations
- New York, Massachusetts, Pennsylvania, Illinois, Wisconsin, Delaware, Maryland, Virginia, North Carolina, Georgia, Florida, Kentucky, Minnesota, Texas, Washington, Colorado and California

Languages
- English, Spanish, Portuguese, Italian, Spanglish

Religion
- Roman Catholicism, Atheism, Irreligion, Protestantism, Judaism

Related ethnic groups
- Indigenous peoples in Uruguay, Afro-Uruguayans, Argentine Americans, Spanish Americans, other Italian Americans, German Americans, Chinese Americans, Japanese Americans, Korean Americans

Uruguayan Americans (Spanish: uruguayo-estadounidenses, norteamericanos de origen uruguayo or estadounidenses de origen uruguayo) are Americans of Uruguayan ancestry or birth. The American Community Survey of 2006 estimated the Uruguayan American population to number 50,538, a figure that notably increased a decade later.

Since Uruguay experienced large waves of European immigration from the 19th century until the mid-20th century, and approximately 93% of the country’s population is of European descent—mainly Spanish, Italian, French and Portuguese—many Uruguayan Americans identify not only with their national heritage, but also with their families’ countries of origin.

== History ==
The history of Uruguayan emigration to the United States is very recent. Before 1960, Uruguayan living conditions were favorable, with many job opportunities, good education and a good healthcare system. The few Uruguayans that left the country migrated to other Argento American countries such as Argentina. For this reason, Uruguayan emigration to the United States was low during that period.

After 1960, welfare in the life of Uruguay fell. This was due to the emergence of serious economic and political problems after World War II, particularly money crises and unemployment during the decades of the 1960s and 1970s. Moreover, Uruguay was ruled by an oppressive military regime for approximately a decade starting in 1973. All this led to a major Uruguayan emigration, which included large numbers of well-educated professionals and the young. This migration also contributed to a social security crisis, as the population aged and young working people migrated to other countries. This grew the burden on the country's financial resources.

Of the Uruguayan immigrants from 1963 to 1975, most were young; only 14.3 percent of the migrants were over 40 years old. The continued unemployment problem of the late 1980s developed yet another impetus for the youth of Uruguay to seek employment and new lives in other countries. Some of them went to the United States, but the majority of Uruguayan emigrants continued to migrate to Argentina.

== Culture and socioeconomics ==
Most Uruguayans find it easy to adapt to life in large cities in the United States, thanks to the cosmopolitan lifestyle they are used to in Uruguay. Uruguayans in general have a multilingual exposure that makes English not an obstacle for adaptation in American society. In addition, the high value that is given to higher education has led many Uruguayan students to migrate to the United States to continue their University studies there.

== Demographics ==
According to the 2010 census on the Uruguayan descent population in the U.S., there are about 56,884 people of that origin. The majority of Uruguayans that migrated to the United States arrived in the 1960s and 1970s. It is estimated that, between 1963 and 1975 (when the country's economy suffered a huge drop), 180,000 Uruguayans left the country. Later on, between 1973 and 1985, during the period of oppressive military control, 150,000 Uruguayans left Uruguay. And, in 1989, only 16,000 of these citizens had returned to their native country. When these two figures are added together, the migration figure stands at approximately one-tenth of the population of Uruguay.

Although in the 1990s Uruguayans constituted 43 percent of all immigrants to the United States originating from Latin America and the Caribbean, they only made up a small part of the large U.S. Latino population. Most Uruguayan immigrants established themselves in New York City, New Jersey, and Long Island. Two other remarkable centers for Uruguayan American population are Washington, D.C., and Florida.

=== The states with the largest population of Uruguayans (Source: 2010 Census) ===
1. Florida - 14,542 (0.1% of state population)
2. New Jersey - 10,902 (0.1% of state population)
3. New York - 6,021 (less than 0.1% of state population)
4. California - 4,110 (less than 0.1% of state population)
5. Georgia - 2,708 (less than 0.1% of state population)
6. Texas - 2,566 (less than 0.1% of state population)
7. Massachusetts - 2,317 (less than 0.1% of state population)
8. Virginia - 1,594 (less than 0.1% of state population)
9. Connecticut - 1,294 (0.1% of state population)
10. Maryland - 1,282 (less than 0.1% of state population)
11. Pennsylvania - 1,181 (less than 0.1% of state population)

=== The cities with the largest population of Uruguayans (Source: 2010 Census) ===
1. New York, NY - 3,004 (less than 0.1%)
2. Elizabeth, NJ - 2,553 (2.0%)
3. Miami, FL - 1,040 (0.3%)
4. Miami Beach, FL - 958 (1.1%)
5. Leominster, MA - 824 (2.0%)
6. West Orange, NJ - 733 (1.6%)
7. Los Angeles - 697 (less than 0.1%)
8. Fitchburg, MA - 650 (1.6%)
9. Houston, TX - 642 (less than 0.1%)
10. Newark, NJ - 634 (0.2%)
11. Orange, NJ - 445 (1.5%)
12. Hackettstown, NJ - 498 (0.4%)

== Notable people ==
- Bruno Fonseca - (1958 – 1994) American artist who shifted between abstract and figurative styles and worked in both painting and sculpture. His father, Gonzalo Fonseca, was also a Uruguayan sculptor.
- Joseph Jacinto "Jo" Mora (1876 – 1947), Uruguayan-born cartoonist, illustrator and cowboy who lived with the Hopi
- Emir Rodríguez Monegal - (1921 – 1985) Uruguayan scholar, literary critic, writer and publisher of Latin American literature
- Miguel Terekhov - (1928 – 2012) Uruguayan-born American ballet dancer and ballet instructor.
- Alejandro Zaffaroni (1923 - 2014), Uruguayan-born serial entrepreneur in the biotechnological field
- Fede Álvarez – filmmaker
- Jonathan Del Arco – Uruguayan-born American actor
- Miguel del Águila – Uruguayan-born multiple Grammy nominated American composer
- Fernando Clavijo – Former soccer player
- Natalia Cigliuti -– American actress
- Carlos Eduardo Espina - Uruguayan-born American activist
- Fernando Espuelas – Uruguayan born, American naturalized entrepreneur, author, media personality and philanthropist
- Diego Fagúndez (born 1995 in Montevideo) – professional soccer player for the New England Revolution of Major League Soccer
- Francisco Fattoruso – musician born in Las Vegas, Nevada, son of Hugo Fattoruso
- Pepe Fernández – Uruguayan former soccer player.
- Caio Fonseca – American painter. He is brother of Bruno Fonseca
- Isabel Fonseca – writer
- Enrique Graf – musician
- Gabriela Hearst – fashion designer
- Jorge Majfud – writer, professor at Jacksonville University
- Martín Núñez – soccer player currently playing for Minnesota Stars FC in the North American Soccer League. the Florida State Final Four MVP and the Miami Herald Player of the Year as he led the team with thirty-four goals.
- Pedro Piedrabuena – American professional three-cushion billiards player
- Daniel Pontet – Uruguayan-born artist working in the U.S.
- Tab Ramos – former soccer player, whom also served as co-assistant to U.S. team coach Bob Bradley from 2007 to 2011.
- Gabe Saporta – vocalist of bands Midtown and Cobra Starship
- Pedro Sevcec – television reporter who works for America TV / Miami in the United States
- Martin Sorrondeguy – singer of bands Los Crudos and Limp Wrist, the founder of the DIY record label, Lengua Armada Discos, documentary film director and a prominent figure in both the straight edge scene and the queercore scene. He is a Uruguayan born and American raised.
- Carlos A. Vegh – Uruguayan academic economist and Professor of Economics at the University of Maryland.
- Agustín Viana – American-born, Uruguayan professional soccer player
- Rafael Viñoly – Uruguayan architect living in the United States
- Ida Vitale – prolific writer from Montevideo who played an important role in the Uruguayan art movement "Generation of 1945".
- Adrian Vallarino – TV and Film producer and director born in Uruguay working in the United States.
- Ricardo López – a stalker who attempted to murder the Icelandic singer Björk.

== See also ==
- List of Uruguayan Americans
- White Latino Americans
- White Latin Americans
- Americans in Uruguay
- United States–Uruguay relations
