= Fonseca (surname) =

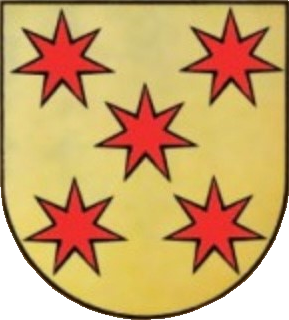
- Coat of arms associated with Fonseca
- Language: Portuguese

Origin
- Meaning: dry fount
- Region of origin: Portugal

Other names
- Variant forms: Fonseka, Afonseca, Affonseca, de Fonseca, de Afonseca, de Affonseca, D'Afonseca, D'Affonseca

Fonseca is a surname of Portuguese origin, that can be found in Portuguese-speaking countries, as well as in Spanish-speaking countries and among Sephardic Jews. A feudal lordship name from a place named for a spring that dried up during the summer months, it comes from Latin fons sicca, meaning "dry fount".

Fonseca or Fonseka may refer to:

== People ==
- Alonso III Fonseca (1475–1534), Galician archbishop and politician
- Andrea Fonseka, Malaysian actor, television presenter and model and winner of Miss Malaysia Universe 2004
- Angelo da Fonseca (1902–1967), Indian artist
- Antônio Joao da Fonseca (born 1966), Brazilian footballer
- Bruno Fonseca (1958–1994), American painter and sculptor
- Carlo Fonseka (1933–2019), Sri Lankan medical academic
- Carlos Fonseca Amador (1936–1976), Nicaraguan founder of the Sandinistas
- Carlos Fonseca (boxer) (born 1955), Brazilian boxer
- Carolyn De Fonseca (1929–2009), American film and voice actress
- Casto Fonseca (1800–1845), Nicaraguan military dictator
- Celso Fonseca (born 1956), Brazilian samba, bossa nova and música popular brasileira guitarist and vocalist
- Cholomondeley de Fonseka Goonewardene (1917-2006), Sri Lankan Sinhala Trotskyist politician
- Cleonâncio Fonseca (1936–2021), Brazilian politician
- Daniel Fonseca (born 1969), Uruguayan football (soccer) player
- Daniel de Fonseca (1672–c. 1740), Jewish court physician and courtier in Europe
- Daniele Fonseca, birth name of Italian unification leader Daniele Manin (1804–1857)
- Danny Fonseca (born 1979), Costa Rican football (soccer) player
- David Fonseca (born 1973), Portuguese singer
- Deodoro da Fonseca (1827–1892), first President of the Republic of Brazil
- Duduka da Fonseca (born 1951), Brazilian jazz drummer and band leader
- Édgar Fonseca (born 1981), Colombian road cyclist
- Edison Fonseca (born 1984), Colombian football (soccer) player
- Eleonora Fonseca Pimentel (1751–1799), Neapolitan poet and revolutionary
- Enrique Fonseca, (1918–2020), Venezuelan baseball player
- Eugene Reginald de Fonseka (died 2003), puisne judge of the Supreme Court of Sri Lanka
- Flor Isava Fonseca (1921–2020), Venezuelan sportswoman and writer
- Francisco Fonseca (born 1979), Mexican football (soccer) player
- Fumilay Fonseca (born 1988), São Toméan race walker
- Gamini Fonseka (1936–2004), Sri Lankan film actor and politician
- Gampalage Shehan Naveendra De Fonseka Gunawarna Jayasuriya (born 1991), Sri Lankan cricketer
- Gonzalo Fonseca (1922–1997), Uruguayan sculptor
- Graciano Fonseca (born 1974), Colombian road cyclist
- Guillermo Fonseca Álvarez (1933–2026), Mexican politician
- Hermes Rodrigues da Fonseca (1855–1923), President of Brazil
- Isaac Aboab da Fonseca (1605–1693), rabbi, scholar, kabbalist and writer in Europe and South America
- Isabel Fonseca (born 1961), American writer
- J. P. de Fonseka (1897–1948), Sri Lankan essayist
- João Fonseca (born 2006), Brazilian tennis player
- Juan Fernando Fonseca (born 1979), Colombian singer better known under his stage name Fonseca
- Juan Rodríguez de Fonseca, (1451–1524), Spanish archbishop, courtier and bureaucrat
- Lew Fonseca (1899–1989), American baseball player
- Luis Fonseca (runner) (born 1977), Venezuelan long-distance runner
- Luis Fonseca (United States Navy) (born 1980), a United States Navy hospital corpsman and hero of the Iraq War
- Luis Fonseca (weightlifter) (born 1949), Costa Rican weightlifter
- Lyndsy Fonseca (born 1987), American television and film actress
- Malini Fonseka, Sri Lankan film actress
- Mary L. Fonseca (1915–2005), American politician and Massachusetts state senator
- Melquises Fonseca (born 1949), Cuban runner
- Mervyn Fonseka (1897–1946), Sri Lankan lawyer
- Morawakkorakoralege Walter Fonseka Abeykoon (1903-?), Ceylonese civil servant
- Mohotti Arachchilage Sriyani Kulawansa-Fonseca (born 1970), Sri Lankan Olympic hurdler
- Paulo Fonseca (born 1973), Portuguese football soccer manager
- Peter Fonseca (born 1966), Canadian politician
- Ralph Fonseca (1949–2025), Belizean politician
- Ramón Fonseca Mora (born 1952), Panamanian novelist and attorney
- Ray Fonseca (dancer) (1953–2010), American professional hula dancer
- Ray Fonseca (politician) (born 1959), a US Virgin Island senator
- Roberto Fonseca (born 1975), Cuban jazz pianist
- Roberto Fonseca (football manager) (born 1962), Brazilian football manager
- Rolando Fonseca (born 1974), Costa Rican football (soccer) player
- Sarath Fonseka (born 1950), Sri Lankan politician and senior military officer
- Susantha de Fonseka (1900–1963), Sri Lankan statesman
- Todd A. Fonseca (born 1966), American author of juvenile fiction
