= Hospital Saint Bois Murals =

Murals painted by the Taller Torres García group (1944)

The murals of the Saint Bois Hospital were a series of 35 murals at the Martirené Pavilion at the Hospital Saint Bois in Uruguay. The murals were created by Joaquín Torres-García and the members of the Taller Torres García art group and were inaugurated on July 29, 1944.

== History ==
=== Creation ===
In 1944, the Director of the Hospital Saint Bois Pavilion, Dr. Pablo Purriel, contacted Joaquín Torres-García to request a mural that would distract tuberculosis patients from the pain and anguish hey were suffering. Of the 35 murals, 7 were painted by Torres-García and the other 28 by twenty of his students from the Taller Torres García art school. The women who participated were Quela Rovira, Elsa Andrada, Esther Barrios de Martín, María Helena García Brunel, Teresa Olascoaga and Josefina Canel. The men who participated were Augusto Torres, Horacio Torres, Julio Alpuy, Gonzalo Fonseca, Daniel de los Santos, Julián San Vicente, Manuel Pailós, Sergio de Castro, Alceu Ribeiro, Luis A. Gentieu, Juan Pardo, Andrés Moskovics, Héctor Ragni, and Daymán Antúnez.

The murals were designed to follow an abstract theme and to draw from the Universal Constructivism art movement developed by the Taller Torres García group, with added elements from daily life in the country. Thus, the murals represented themes of farming, music, education, and community, among others.

The creation of these murals was entirely voluntary, and there was no charge for their design or execution.

In 1996, the murals were declared Historical Heritage at the request of the 'Commission of the Historical, Artistic and Cultural Heritage of the Nation'.

=== Murals ===
- La Escuela. Quela Rovira (189x272cm)
- El Tambo. Elsa Andrada (152x197cm)
- Ciudad. Alceu Ribeiro (100x260cm)
- Hombre. Horacio Torres (189x192cm)
- Puerto. Horacio Torres (180x490cm)
- Herramientas. Luis San Vicente
- La Ciencia. Teresa Olascoaga
- Almuerzo. Augusto Torres (189x205cm)
- Ferrocarril. Augusto Torres (190x490cm)
- Café. Gonzalo Fonseca (132x188cm)
- Ciudad. Gonzalo Fonseca (190x375cm)
- Ciudad. Julio Alpuy (200x300cm)
- Composición. Julio Alpuy (108x266)
- Ciudad. Dayman Antunez (189x293cm)276)
- Locomotora. Manuel Pailós (88x276cm)
- Herramientas. Héctor Ragni (135x281cm)
- Jardín. Juan Pardo (153x189cm)
- Barco Daniel de los Santos (190x228cm)
- Submarino. Daniel de los Santos (127x280cm)
- El transporte Andrés Moskovics (189x219cm)
- El Circo. Josefina Canel (100x150cm)
- Herramientas. Julián Luis San Vicente (189x209cm)
- Composición. Julián Luis San Vicente (104x268cm)
- La música. María Helena García Brunell (190x203cm)
- La música. Luis Gentieu (189x218cm)
- Casa Sergio de Castro (140x185cm)
- Mar. Sergio de Castro (188x276cm)
- La Escuela. Esther Barrios de Martín (148x151cm)
- Utensillos. Teresa Olascoaga (190x280cm)
- La Ciencia. Teresa Olascoaga (190x280cm)
- Forma. Joaquín Torres García (127x193)
- El Tranvía. Joaquín Torres García (190x700cm)
- Pax in Lucem. Joaquín Torres García (100x400cm)
- Locomotora blanca. Joaquín Torres García (103x130cm)
- El Sol. Joaquín Torres García (190x700cm)
- Pachamama. Joaquín Torres García (87x280cm)
- El Pez. Joaquín Torres García (189x285cm)

=== Controversy ===
When the murals were inaugurated, there were many people who opposed the messages and imagery of the murals, and some newspapers of the time expressed concern that they could have a negative effect on patients. There were also concerns that the Taller Torres García group should not have been chosen for this project. There were also voices in favor and who supported the creation of the murals.

=== Transferal ===
In 1970, the murals were removed from the walls of the hospital and placed on racks to be displayed in different places. In 1978, a fire at the Museum of Modern Art in Rio de Janeiro severely damaged some of the art pieces and completely destroyed others.

In 1997 ANTEL, the government-owned telecommunications entity of Uruguay, signed a contract with the Ministry of Education and Culture so that the former would be in charge of the custody and care of some parts of the murals that remained in the Saint Bois Hospital and those that were recovered after the fire. This management was thanks to the initiative of the Friends of Cultural Heritage Foundation. In 1997, most of the pieces were moved to the ANTEL Communications Tower where they were displayed on several floors of the building. The agreement was for them to be exhibited at the tower for 50 years.

The only mural that remains as a reminder of this monumental work in the Saint Bois Hospital is Ciudad by Alceu Ribeiro.

== Restoration ==
In 2016, Andrés Moskovics, the only one of the original artists still living, returned to the hospital to paint a new mural on the invitation of Professor Alejandra Gutiérrez, teacher and plastic artist (former member of the Arte en la Escuela Collective) and by medical historian Dr. Juan Ignacio Gil.

== See also ==
- Hospital Saint Bois
- Joaquín Torres-García
