= Gallesio =

Gallesio is an Italian surname. Notable people with the surname include:

- Giorgio Gallesio (1772–1839), Italian botanist
- Josefina Canel Suarez de Gallesio (1915–2004), Uruguayan painter
