= National Museum of Tequila =

Museo Nacional del Tequila
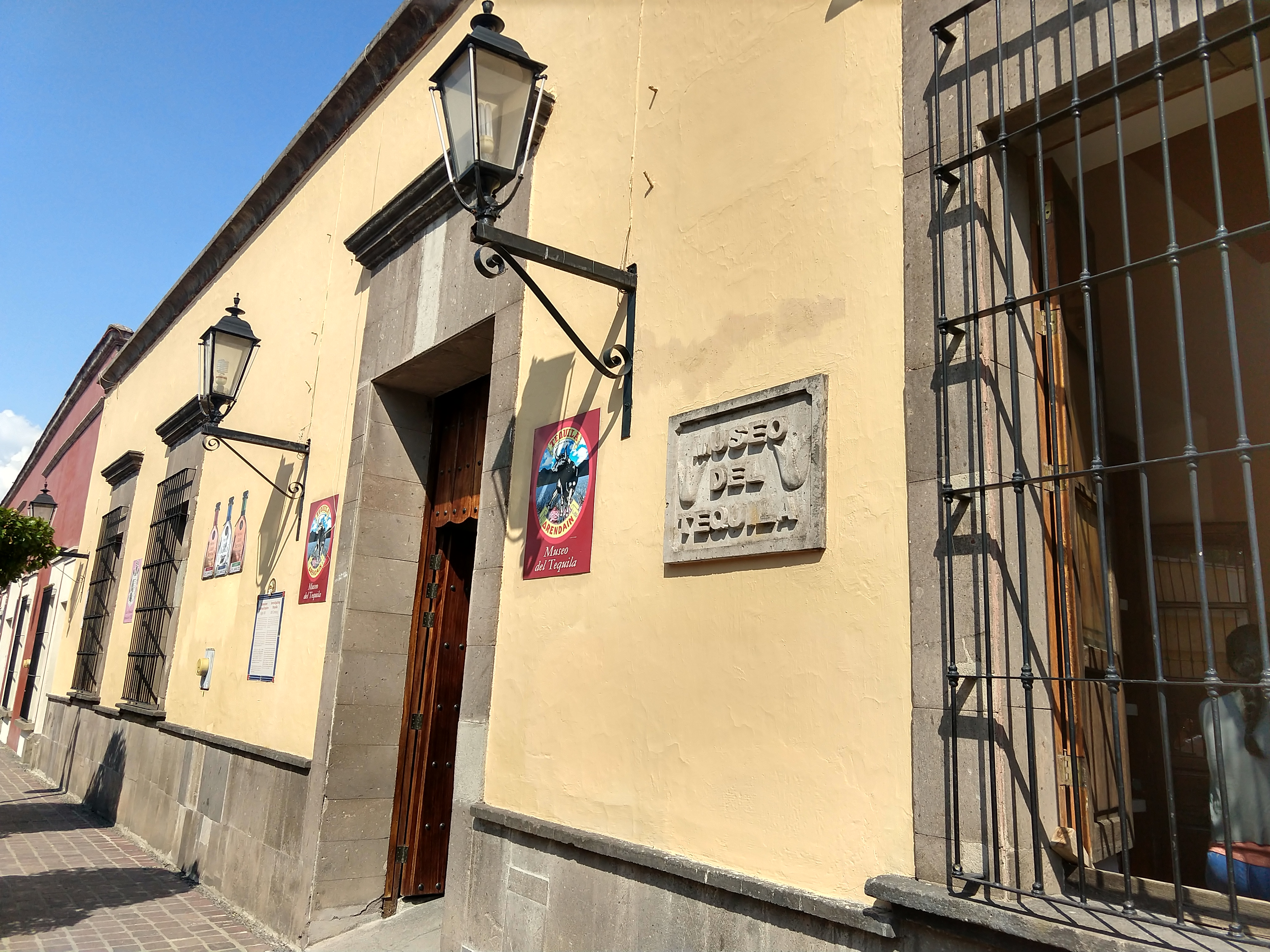
- Museo Tequila.jpg
- Established: January 19, 2000
- Location: Jalisco Tequila Mexico
- Coordinates: 20°52′46″N 103°50′8″W
- Type: Museum
- Architect: Alicia Rodriguez
- Website: http://sic.gob.mx/ficha.php?table=museo&table_id=1029

The National Museum of Tequila (MUNAT) located in the City of Tequila, Jalisco, Mexico, is a Museum about the history of Tequila (the drink) and an art center.

The museum counts six individual spaces representing aspects about the evolution of the alcoholic beverage Tequila and its origins, displaying objects in relation to its production as well as a major collection of tequila containers and objects, including two blown glass bottles by the engineer Hipólito Gutiérrez, which were recognized as a Guinness record in 1996 and 1997.On the central terrace is an old agave mill, which illustrates part of the rustic tequila production process. In the permanent rooms, visitors can observe the evolution of the production of this emblematic drink through photographs, maps and some objects from pre-Hispanic times and their various variations to the present.

== Exhibitions ==
The museum holds monthly temporary exhibitions of painting, photography and sculpture. In 2015, they presented "Tequila is a bird that flies inside me" by artist Víctor Hugo Pérez. To celebrate its 15 years, an exhibition was held with works by Carlos Torres, Aristeo García and Lucía Maya. In November 2020, they showed the works of international artists in “Between Two Worlds” with the participation of Adriana Mangluppi, Álvaro J. Abad, Daniel Garbade, Ana María Fuentes, Beatriz Olabarría and Dalia Berlin.
