= George X (talk show host) =

Mexican television show host

- Born: Jorge Bribiesca Ayala; January 23, 1974 (age 51); Distrito Federal
- Occupation: television host
- Years active: 1995–present

Jorge Bribiesca Ayala (born January 23, 1974), better known as George X (pronounced as the letter "X" and not "ten") (born January 23, 1974) is a Mexican television show host specialized in action sports and Mixed Martial Arts. George X is the Spanish-language announcer of the X Games for ESPN Deportes and play-by-play commentator for the Mixed martial arts promotion company Bellator Fighting Championships. While working for Televisa in 2001, George X gained national notoriety in Mexico as he covered Super Bowl XXXV dressed as an American football player. In 2004 George X hosted the controversial Fear Factor-like series Gana la Verde for Liberman Broadcasting in Los Angeles, where winning contestants were promised legal representation to get a Green Card. In addition, George X hosted 3 seasons of the award-winning show Reto Final Nissan for Fox Deportes, where he had to reunite international soccer stars and get them to play a televised rematch.

== Family background ==
George X comes from a family of artists. His father Jorge Bribiesca Castañeda (1920–1997) was an accomplished guitar professor who also played with several Trios and Quartets in the 70's being the most famous Guitarras Mexicanas with Ramon Dona-Dio. He performed in several movies and Television shows alongside actors such as Wolf Ruvinskis and Cuco Sanchez. George X's uncle Salvador Bribiesca was a talented and respected painter and founder of the Instituto de Arte Bribiesca (Bribiesca Arts Institute) in Mexico City. Given his impressive realistic style, he was a sought after artists by celebrities and politicians for personal portraits. His second uncle was legendary composer and guitarist Antonio Bribiesca, famous in Mexico in the 60's and 70's for his unique style of playing traditional Mexican music on the guitar. He starred in several films, radio and television shows including La Hora Max Factor and El show de Paco Malgesto. Some of his accomplishments include winning Golden records and the "Microfono de Oro" awards. He died in 1980 but his music is still enjoyed by millions.

== Early life ==
George X was born in Mexico City on January 23, 1974. The son of Aurelia Ayala a homemaker and guitar professor Jorge Bribiesca Castañeda. George X grew up in the northern district of Mexico City and at the age of 11 relocated to Guadalajara, Jalisco. Shortly after moving, George X started training Tae Kwon Do, a Korean Martial art. After 3 years in the sport he earned the black belt 1st dan degree. In High School, George X excelled in graphic design and media. He became a popular cartoon designer and school radio and television host/producer.

== Television career ==
=== Channel 4 Guadalajara ===
George X started his television career behind the camera. His first job was at Televisa Guadalajara Channel 4 as a graphic design assistant where he created several show logos, storyboards and promos. In the summer of 1995 he became the host of the kids game show Super Acción. The show was cancelled after 2 years on the air. Later on, George X joined the production team of the edgy action sports and music show Generacion X. The show was produced by film director and Producer Fernando Lebrija Amar a morir.

=== Televisa ===
Between 1998 and 2000 he worked with producers Fernando Lebrija and Miguel Angel Fox as art director for several shows including:

- 1998 Espacio de Tatiana hosted by Tatiana (singer)
- 1999 Musical Especial El Reencuentro
- 1999Rostros de Mexico hosted by Jacobo Zabludovsky
- 2000 Musical Especial 80's Pop band Flans
- 2000 Musical Especial Jaguares (rock band)

=== Televisa Deportes ===
Between 2000 and 2003 George X worked for Televisa Deportes as a special event correspondent, adventure reporter and segment host.

- 2000 Mas Deporte Note: Host of the celebrity and sports segment "Famosos en el Deporte"
- 2000 Australia la Aventura con George X. Note: 24 adventure segments in Australia. Scuba Diving, skydiving, bungee jumping and Rock climbing
- 2000 TDX Televisa Deportes Extremo
- 2001 Super Bowl XXXV Note: Interviewed NFL Hall of famer Jerry Rice, David Copperfield (illusionist) and comedian Jay Mohr
- 2001 Running of the Bulls in Pamplona
- 2001 NBA Finals (Reporter) Note: Interviewed former President Bill Clinton in Philadelphia
- 2001 Copa Libertadores (Reporter)
- 2001 Africa la Aventura con George X (Producer / host) Note: Bungee Jumped 111 m from the Victoria falls bridge in Zambia
- 2002 Winter Olympics (Reporter / co-host)
- 2003 Super Bowl XXXVII (Reporter) Note: Interviewed legendary musician Carlos Santana and Country singer Shania Twain

=== ESPN and the X Games ===
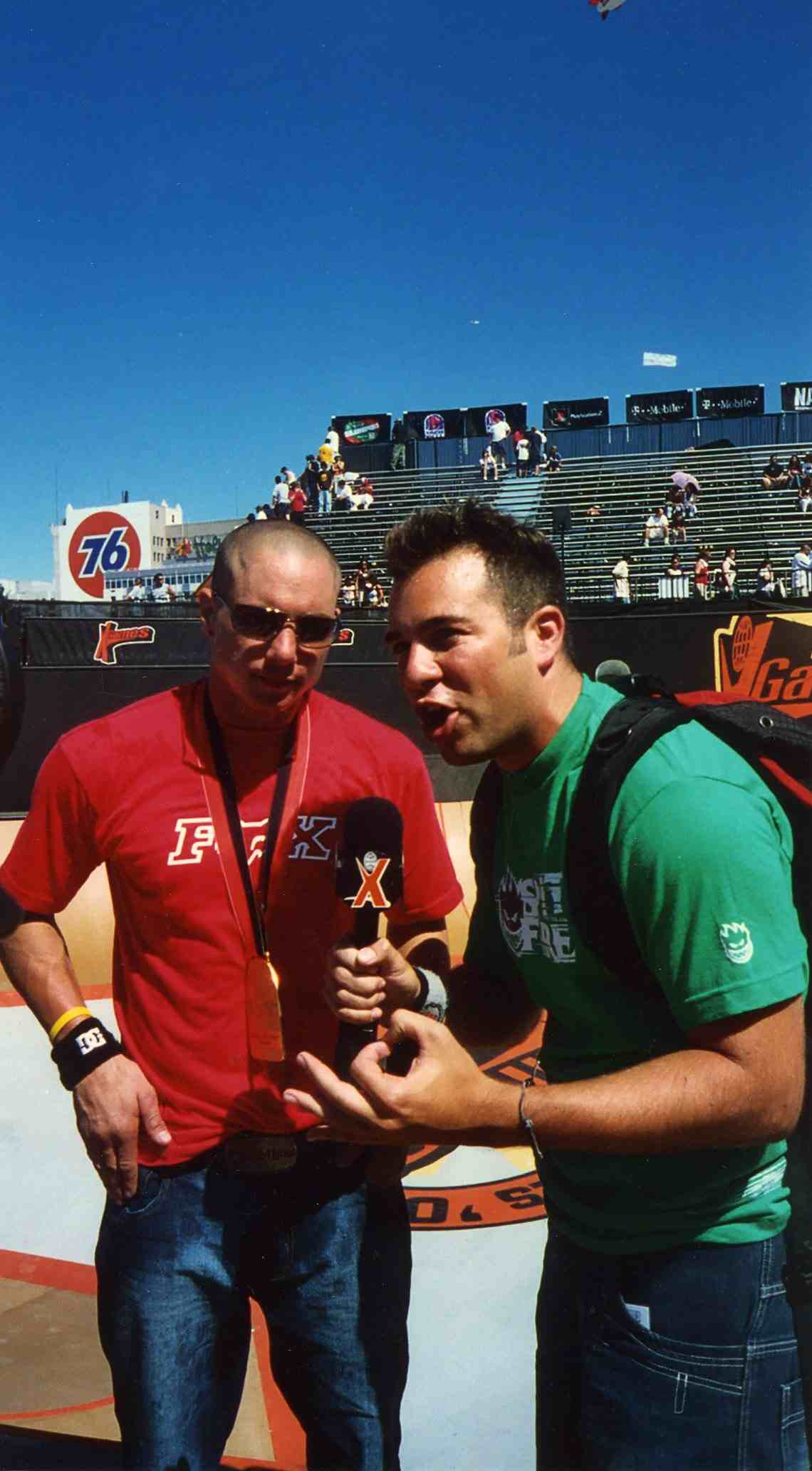
George X interviewing BMX Champion Dave Mirra at X Games 2004.

Since 2004 George X has covered the X Games for ESPN Deportes as on-site reporter and play-by-play commentator and blog writer. Some of the events covered and athletes interviewed by George X are:

- 2004 Latin X Games (Brazil) Dennis McCoy, Sandro Dias, Fabiola da Silva
- 2004 X Games X (Los Angeles) Bucky Lasek, Dave Mirra, Nate Adams
- 2005 Winter X Games IX (Aspen, Co) Shaun White, Brian Deegan, Blair Morgan
- 2005 X Games XI (Los Angeles) Live anchor and play-by-play commentator
- 2005 X Games Dubai (Reporter)
- 2006 Winter X Games X (Aspen)
- 2006 X Games XII (Los Angeles) Jamie Bestwick, Travis Pastrana
- 2007 Winter X Games XI
- 2007 X Games XIII
- 2007 X Games Mexico (Live)
- 2008 Winter X Games XII
- 2008 X Games XIV
- 2008 X Games Brazil (São Paulo, Br) Bob Burnquist, Todd Potter
- 2008 X Games Mexico (Mexico city)

=== Gana la Verde ===
In 2004, George X hosted 85 episodes of the controversial reality television series Gana la Verde for KRCA Liberman Broadcasting in Los Angeles, CA. In this Fear Factor style program contestants endured tough physical challenges in order to become eligible for legal representation to get a Green Card. Despite its popularity and high ratings, the show was criticized by immigrant-rights advocates and competitive networks for creating false hope and talking advantage of the contestants' precarious conditions.

=== Reto Final Nissan ===
George X hosted 3 seasons of the soccer-adventure reality series Reto Final Nissan for Fox Deportes. Each season showcased a soccer rivalry between two countries or clubs. In 5 weeks George X traveled across the world tracking down the actual players who participated in some of the rivalry's most memorable games and invited them to play a rematch. In 2007, the show won the Imagen Award for best foreign language program and a Naamic Vision Award.

- 2006 Season 1 Mexico vs USA (1997 National teams)
- 2007 Season 2 Mexico vs Argentina (National teams 1994–2006)
- 2008 Season 3 El Súper Clásico (Mexico) Chivas vs America.

Some of the players interviewed by George X were:

- Oswaldo Sanchez
- Hugo Sanchez
- Javier Zanetti
- Oscar Ruggeri
- Jorge Campos
- Javier Saviola
- Sergio Goycochea
- Luís Roberto Alves
- Luis Garcia
- Alexi Lalas
- Luis Hernandez
- Marcelo Balboa

=== Bellator MMA ===
George X was the Spanish-language play-by-play commentator for the Mixed Martial Arts organization Bellator MMA. George X's broadcast partner was former King of the Cage Heavyweight Champion, Manny Rodriguez.

- 2009 Season 1. (ESPN Deportes)
- 2010 Season 2. (Telemundo)
- 2010 Season 3. (MultiVision)
- 2011 - 2013. (MTV2 / Mun2)
- 2013 - 2017 (ESPN Deportes / Spike TV)

=== Premier Boxing Champions ===
In 2015, George X and Manny Rodriguez were the Spanish commentators for Premier Boxing Champions on Spike TV's SAP.

=== Professional Fighters League ===
From 2018 to 2019, George X and Manny Rodriguez were the Spanish commentators for Professional Fighters League on Facebook Watch and ESPN Deportes.
