= Alceu =

Alceu is a masculine given name which may refer to:

- Alceu Collares (1927–2024), Brazilian politician and lawyer
- Alceu Feldmann (born 1972), Brazilian racing driver
- Alceu Amoroso Lima (1893–1983), Brazilian writer, journalist and activist
- Alceu Ribeiro (1919–2013), Uruguayan painter and sculptor
- Alceu Valença (born 1946), Brazilian singer, musician and songwriter
- Alceu (footballer), Brazilian footballer Alceu Rodrigues Simoni Filho (born 1984)
