= Vallarino =

Vallarino is a surname. Notable people with the surname include:

- Nicolás Ardito Barletta Vallarino (born 1938), Panamanian politician and President of Panama
- Adrian Vallarino (born 1968), Uruguayan film producer, director and journalist
- Alberto Vallarino Clement (born 1951), Panamanian businessman and politician
- Arturo Vallarino (born 1943), Panamanian politician
- Carlo Vallarino Gancia, Brazilian businessman
