= Lucía Maya =

Mexican artist

Lucía Maya (born 1953 in Santa Catalina Island, California) is a Mexican painter, sculptor and lithographer whose work has been displayed at the Ronna and Eric Hoffman Gallery of Contemporary Art, Portland, Oregon, the Puerto Rico Museum of Contemporary Art and the National Museum of Tequila in 2015.

She was born on Santa Catalina Island in California in 1953, but moved with her family to San Pedro Tlaquepaque, Jalisco, Mexico in 1957. In 1971 she began studying at the University of Guadalajara and, in 1974, she moved to Spain to study at the Academia de Bellas Artes San Fernando in Madrid. In 1978 she married the art history professor Gutierre Aceves Piña, from whom she separated in 1993. Her first exhibition was held at the Degollado Theatre. Apart from short stays in New Jersey, Argentina and Europe, Maya has lived in Guadalajara since 1957.
