= Sylvia R. Mata =

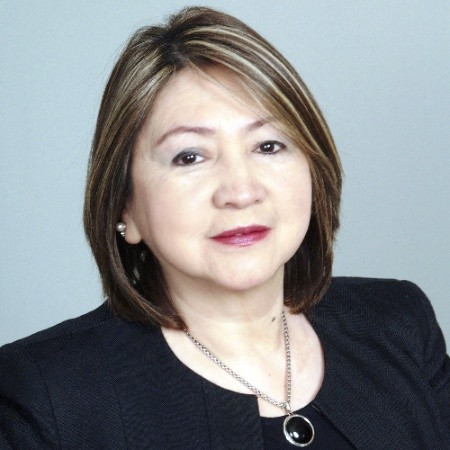
- Born: Ecuador
- Education: IE Business School, Universidad Central del Ecuador
- Employer(s): LULAC, ArteLatAm

Sylvia R. Mata is an Ecuadorian social advocate, community leader, economist, and column editor. She is the current President of the League of United Latin American Citizens (LULAC) Queens Council for Arts and Education and the Vice President of the NYS LULAC for women. She is also the founder and Vice President of ArteLatAm; an arts organization with its headquarters in Queens, New York.

== Personal life ==
Sylvia R. Mata graduated with a bachelor's degree in Economics and Statistics from Universidad Central del Ecuador. She later obtained her master's degree in Business Administration and Marketing at the IE Business School. She has been living in New York for almost 23 years with her family.

== Professional career ==
As the President of one of the branches from the largest and oldest Hispanic/Latino civil rights organization in the United States, Mata has an extended background in advocating for the well-being of the Hispanic/Latino diaspora in New York. She has fought for education, health care opportunities, financial awareness, immigration services sessions, and the arts. She joined the League of United Latin American Citizens in 2011 and has been working for the organization ever since. As she lives in New York, her multiple approaches to help Latin American immigrants in the city led her to become the president of the organization's council for Arts and Education. Through her position as president, Mata has partnered with a variety of nonprofit, private, and public organizations to provide scholarships, conferences, and workshops mainly about education and professional development. Three years after joining the organization, after showing outstanding devotion for the Latino community within her position, Mata was chosen as the Vice President of the LULAC New York State for Women.

In 2016, Sylvia founded ArteLatAm alongside fellow co-founder, Carlos Torres-Machado. ArteLatAm is an arts organization that works towards increasing the visibility and recognition of Latin American visual artists worldwide by giving them the tools and skills they need to thrive. The organization develops three programs developed in education and artistic development and investment; The programs run anywhere in the world and are available in English and Spanish. It offers advice online, 30 minutes by Skype to contact professionals.

Before and while getting involved with ArteLatAm, Mata produced several art exhibits and cultural projects. Her leadership within the organization has created longstanding collaborations with political appointees, public officials, and Latin American international representatives.

Besides from her field of expertise, Sylvia has served as a local column editor for the QueensLatino Newspaper. Her articles focus on the public health, immigration, and education. One of them called: The responsibility is in all Latinos.
