= Bury Me Standing: The Gypsies and Their Journey =

Book by Isabel Fonseca

- Title page for Bury Me Standing: The Gypsies and Their Journey (1995)
- Author: Isabel Fonseca
- Language: English
- Genre: Non-fiction
- Publisher: Random House
- Publication date: 1995
- Publication place: United States of America
- Media type: Print (hardback and paperback)
- Pages: 322 pp
- ISBN: 0-679-73743-X

Bury Me Standing: The Gypsies and Their Journey is a non-fiction book on the lives of the Romani people by the American-Uruguayan writer Isabel Fonseca published in 1995. The book is organized in eight chapters and contains black and white photographs and maps.

== Synopsis ==
In her book, Fonseca writes about the customs of the Roma (particularly, wedding, funeral rites, and their obsession with purity) and their daily lives, but she also explores their language and their mysterious origin. In addition, she discusses how history has affected current Gypsy settlements. To write this book, Fonseca lived with the Gypsies of Albania and traveled through Bulgaria, Poland, the Czech Republic, Slovakia, the former Yugoslavia, and Romania for four years.

The title "Bury me standing" comes from a proverb which describes the plight of the Gypsies: "Bury me standing. I've been on my knees all my life."

== Reception ==
Many newspapers and magazines praised the work done by Isabel Fonseca and in a review for the New York Times Janet Maslin complimented her writing as being "erudite, beautifully written". Some reviewers noted that Fonseca was emotionally involved with her work, but that overall, she was objective in her description of Gypsy life and suffering.

Academic and scholarly reception was more critical and some noted that while the work was good, Bury Me Standing could not be considered an anthropological work. A reviewer from The Journal of the Royal Anthropological Institute noted that there was room for improvement in those chapters where she recorded the daily lives of the Gypsy family and in specifying more her research methodologies.
