= María Helena García Brunel =

Uruguayan painter (1917–1996)

- Born: April 9, 1917; Rivera, Uruguay
- Died: June 25, 1996 (aged 79); Florida, Uruguay
- Other name: Helena Brunel
- Occupations: Painter and visual artist
- Organization: Taller Torres García
- Notable work: Hospital Saint Bois Murals, La música

María Helena García Brunel (Rivera, Uruguay, April 9, 1917 - Florida, Uruguay, July 25, 1996) was an Uruguayan painter also known as Helena Brunel. She was a member of the Taller Torres García art group and participated in the creation of the murals of the Saint Bois Hospital.

== Biography ==
Helena Brunel began her studies with Guillermo Fernández (plastic artist) between 1936 and 1938, then continued her training with José Cúneo (1939–1941) before entering the Taller Torres García art group in 1941 until 1949. She also studied art while traveling to Europe, Mexico and the United States.

In 1944, Brunel participated in the group of students of the Taller Torres García that created The Murals of the Saint Bois Hospital. She created the mural called La música.

== Works ==
His works are part of the collection of the Juan Manuel Blanes Museum of Montevideo and the Municipal Museum of Plastic Arts of Rivera.

== Awards ==
- Acquisition award at the VII Municipal Hall of Montevideo (1946)
