= Josefina Canel Suarez de Gallesio =

Uruguayan painter (1915–2004)

- Born: October 20, 1915; Montevideo, Uruguay
- Died: October 31, 2004 (aged 92); San José de Mayo, Uruguay
- Occupation: Painter
- Organization: Taller Torres García
- Notable work: Murals at Hospital Saint Bois, El Circo

Josefina Canel Suarez de Gallesio (October 20, 1915, Montevideo, Uruguay - October 31, 2004, San José, Uruguay) was an Uruguayan visual artist and painter who was a member of the Taller Torres García art school.

== Biography ==
Canel was one of the artists among the Taller Torres García art school who painted the Hospital Saint Bois Murals at the Hospital Saint Bois in 1944. Her mural was called El Circo ("The Circle") and was 100x150 centimeters large.
