= Sergio de Castro (artist) =

Franco-Argentine artist (1922–2012)

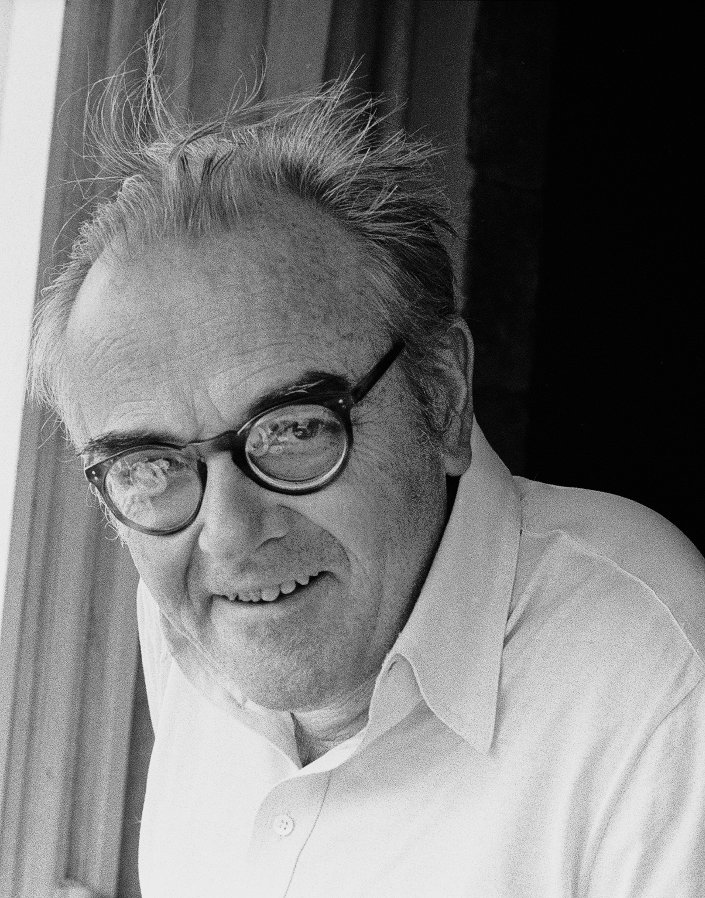
- Sergio de Castro, 1980
- Born: 15 September 1922; Argentina
- Died: 31 December 2012 (aged 90); Paris, France
- Occupation: French-Argentine artist

Sergio de Castro (15 September 1922 – 31 December 2012) was an Argentine artist.

== Biography ==
Sergio de Castro was born in Argentina, in an aristocratic family of Spanish origins (Galicia and the Basque Country), the House of Castro. His father was a diplomat, which is why, from 1923 until 1932, Castro lived in Switzerland with his parents and his two sisters. During these years he visited cities like Lausanne, Geneva and Turin.

In 1933 he entered a Jesuit school in Montevideo and he started studying music. He discovered poetry by learning to speak and write in Spanish. He was specially touched by the works of César Vallejo. Through the years Castro would become close friends with writers like Octavio Paz, Julio Cortázar, Samuel Beckett, Kostas Papaioannou and Georges Schehadé. Later, during a trip to Uruguay, he met Joaquín Torres García, with whom he studied painting and monumental art from 1941 until 1949. In 1942 he moved to Argentina, where he would live until 1949. Castro was also friends with other artists like Nikos Hadjikyriakos-Ghikas, Maria Helena Vieira da Silva and Árpád Szenes.

In 1945 he found a job as a secretary in the Astronomy Observatorium of the city of Córdoba, where we also worked as the assistant to the musician Manuel de Falla in Alta Gracia, until his death in 1946. In 1945 and 1946 he had a grant from the French government to study musical composition. During the year of 1946 he had an exhibition in New York City among other members of Torres García's workshop. That same year he travelled to the northeast of Argentina and the south of Perú to study pre-Columbian art with Gonzalo Fonseca, Julio Uruguay Alpuy and Jonio Montiel.

In 1949 he started teaching History of Music in the new music school of the city of La Plata. His work as a musician drew attention from relevant figures such as Wilhelm Furtwängler, Aaron Copland and Juan José Castro. He quit this job when he got a grant from the French government to improve his musical studies in Paris, where he settled in November 1949. Since 1951 he devoted himself exclusively to painting.

In 1955, his friend the German writer and translator Edith Aron introduced him to Julio Cortázar, who would become a close friend of him. Castro inspired the character of Etienne in Cortázar's novel Rayuela (Hopscotch). In the book is featured the intimate friendship of the protagonist, Horacio Oliveira, with his companion in the Serpent Club, whom he often visited in his studio in Paris. In 1960 he won the Hallmark Prize in New York. In 1979 he obtained French nationality.

In 1980 he showed his works at the Argentine pavilion in the 39th Venice Biennale. He was associate professor in the Human Sciences Faculty of the University of Strasbourg from 1981 until 1986. In 1997 he became Officer in the Ordre des Arts et des Lettres.

In 2006, Sergio de Castro made a 220-work donation to the Fine Arts Museum of Saint-Lô.

He was also a close friend of the musician Alberto Ginastera, who made reference to Sergio de Castro and his first works in his notes on modern Argentine music.

Castro died on 31 December 2012 in Paris. He is buried in the Montparnasse cemetery, in Paris, close to his dear friend Samuel Beckett.

== Monumental works ==
- Two wall paintings for the Martirené Pavilion of the Hospital Saint-Bois (1942), in Montevideo (Uruguay), in collaboration with Joaquín Torres García and his disciples, among which Castro was the youngest.
- The Creation of the Universe (1956–1958), 6m x 20m stained-glass window. Castro worked with painter and glass-maker J. J. K. Ray (1898–1979) in Paris. This window is the church of the Monastery of the Benedictines in Couvrechef- La Folie (Caen). Architect: Jean Zunz.
- Redemption (1968–1969), 4,5 x 17m stained-glass window for Lutheran temple Dietrich Bonhoeffer Kirche in Hamburg-Dulsberg (Germany). Architect: Gerhart Laage.
- The Prophets (1978–1981), five stained glasses for pre-existent windows in the 15th-century Collegiate of Romont (Fribourg), Switzerland.
- Wall painting for Yonne public library, in Saint-Georges-sur-Baulche, in Auxerre (France).
- Wall paintings on the subject of chemistry (numbers and letters) for the company Atochem in Paris La Défense, now renamed Arkema.
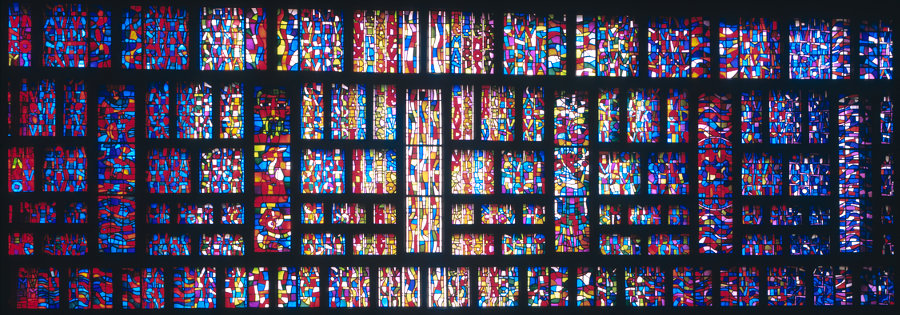
The Creation of the Universe, Monastery of the Benedictines, Couvrechef-La Folie, Caen, 1956–59.

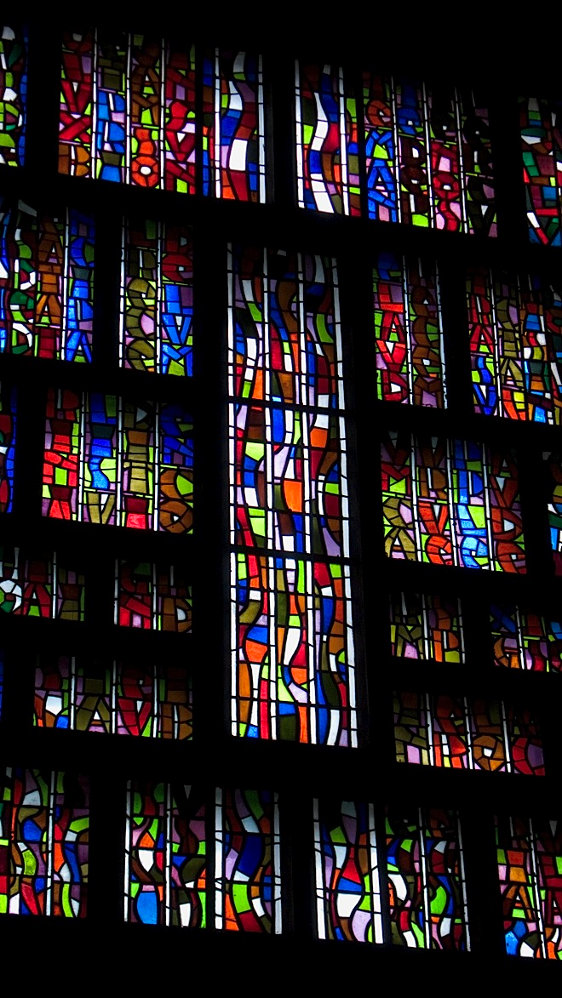
The 7th Day of Creation from the Couvrechef window.

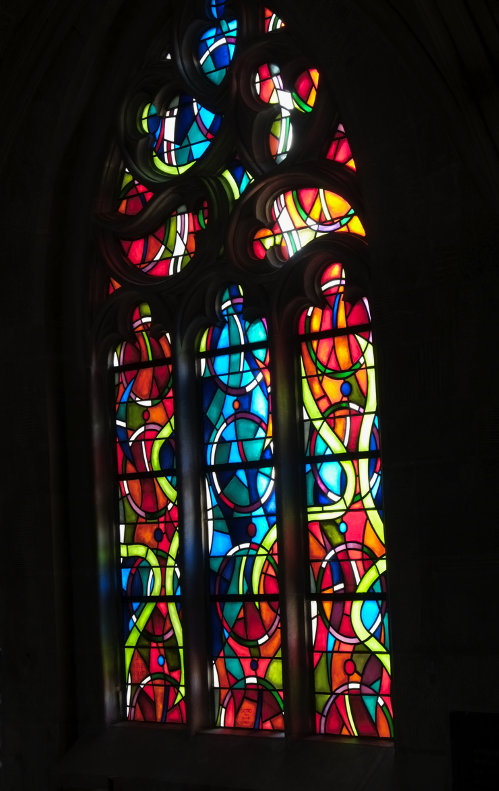
The Burning Bush, Moses window. Collegiate of Romont, Switzerland, 1980. Photo by Dominique Souse.

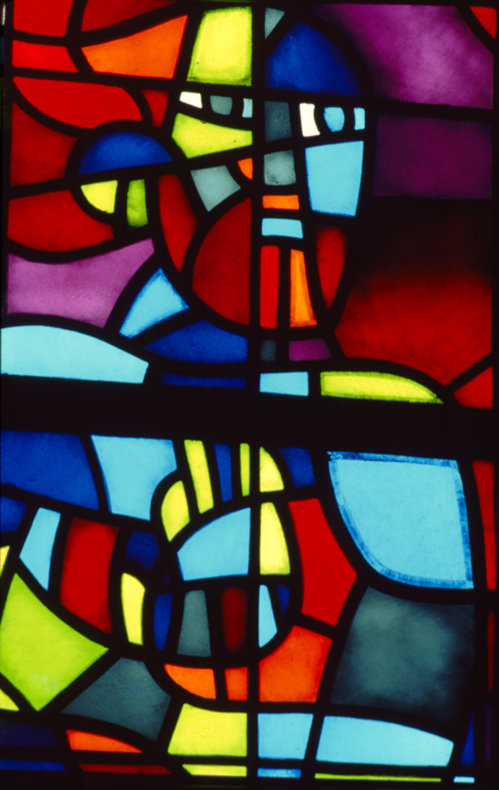
Jonas window (detail). Collegiate of Romont, Switzerland, 1980. Photo by Dominique Souse.

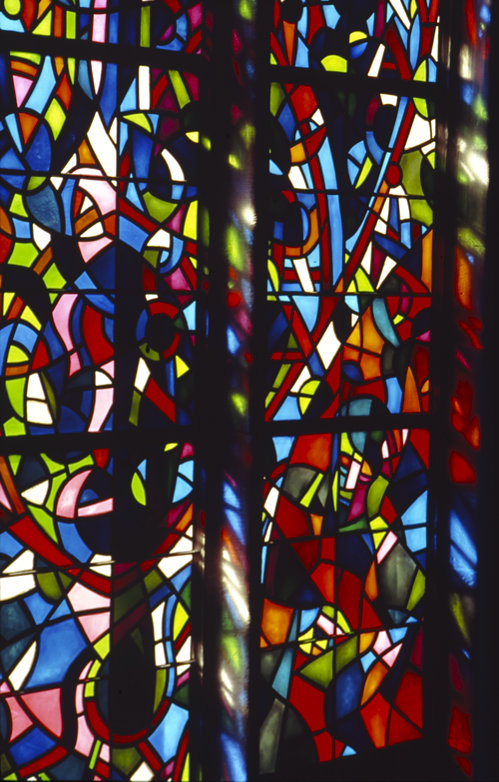
Tree of Jesse, Isaiah window (detail). Collegiate of Romont, Switzerland, 1980. Photo by Dominique Souse.

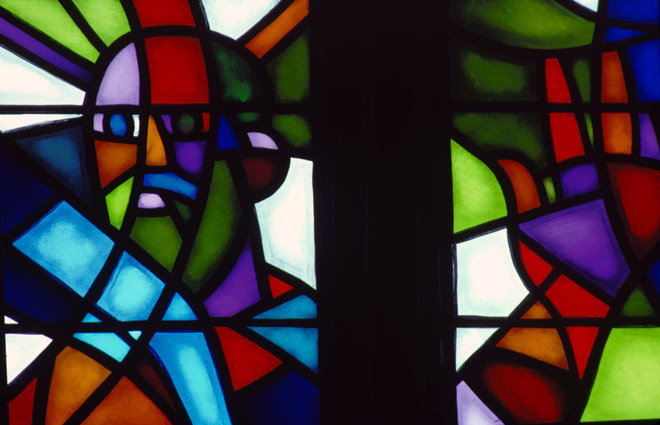
Elias window (detail). Collegiate of Romont, Switzerland, 1980. Photo by Dominique Souse.

== Selected exhibitions ==
- 1952 Galerie Jeanne Castel Paris
- 1954 Galería Bonino Buenos Aires and Galerie Pierre Loeb, Paris
- 1956 Galerie Rive Gauche, Paris
- 1958 Matthiesen Gallery, London
- 1959 documenta 2 Kunst nach 1945 Kassel
- 1961 Matthiesen Gallery, London
- 1963–64 Galeria Lorenzelli, Bergamo and Milan
- 1964 Galería Bettie Thommen, Basel
- 1965 Kunstverein Hamburg Retrospektive
- 1966 Musée d'Art et d'Histoire, Fribourg, Switzerland (retrospective)
- 1966 Recklinhausen, Variationen über ein Thema, Städtische Kunsthalle
- 1970 Retrospektiven in Oslo, Kunstforering, and Kunst Industriemuseet, Copenhagen, Kunstforening, Oslo, Kunstforening, Holstebro
- 1972 Wildenstein Gallery, London Landscapes of Light
- 1974 Galerie Jacob, Paris
- 1975 Kunsthalle Bremen, Retrospektive, Berlin Tempelhof, Kunstamt (Berlin Festival)
- 1975–76 Retrospective exhibition the Musée des Beaux-Arts de Caen (68 artworks from 1956 to 1966), France
- 1979 Hommage à Pierre Loeb, Musée d'Art Moderne de la Ville de Paris
- 1980 39th Venice Biennale
- 1987 French Institute London. Museo de Arte Moderno de Buenos Aires
- 1988 Galerie des Ambassades y Galerie Galarte, Sergio de Castro, Natures Mortes, 1958–1965. Paris/ Bayeux, Diocesan Museum of Sacred Art
- 1989 Galerie des Ambassades, Paris
- 1991–92 Romont, Swiss Stained Glass Museum (Castro Donation)
- 1995 Paris, Galarté Gallery
- 1997 Paris La Défense, Atochem
- 1998 Punta De Este, Sur Gallery, Punta del Este, Uruguay
- 2006–07 Saint-Lô, Normandy, exhibition of the Castro Donation
- 2008 Château de Gruyères, Switzerland, Sergio de Castro
- 2009 Museo Gurvich Montevideo, Uruguay, Francine Del Pierre and Fance Franck's Workshop, Paris

== Bibliography ==
- Denys Sutton, Sergio de Castro, Le Musée de Poche, Paris, 1963.
- Jacques Thuillier, Les Prophètes, Madrid, Ediciones El Viso, 1984.
- (es) Jacques Thuillier, Los Profetas, Madrid, Ediciones El Viso, 1984.
- Étienne Chatton, Nouveaux signes du sacré : Le vitrail contemporain, Lausanne, Fribourg, Coédition Loisirs et Pédagogie, Fragnière, 1985.
- (es) Marie-Pierre Colle-Corcuera, Artistas latinoamericanos en su estudio, México, Noriega Editores, 1994.
- Jacques Thuillier, Sergio de Castro : 60 ans de création, 1944–2004, Paris, Somogy, 2006.
- Véronique David, " Castro et le défi du vitrail ", dans In Situ, revue des patrimoines, 2009, no 123.
