= Todd A. Fonseca =

American novelist

- Born: October 3, 1966 (age 59); Mishawaka, Indiana, U.S.
- Education: Marquette University (BS, MS)
- Occupation: Author
- Writing career
- Genres: Juvenile fiction, science fiction
- Website: thetimecavern.com

Todd A Fonseca (born October 3, 1966, in Mishawaka, IN) is a contemporary American author of Juvenile Fiction. He lives in Andover, Minnesota and is Vice President of Clinical Research and Technical Communications at Medtronic.

== History ==
Fonseca began writing during his college years at Marquette University in Milwaukee, Wisconsin where he received a Bachelor of Science in Electrical Engineering and a Masters of Science in Biomedical Engineering. His first published work, The Time Cavern, was first released as a self-published title in June 2008. After winning a 2009 Indie Excellence finalist award, Ridan Publishing released a second version of the book in October 2009. In November 2011, the second book in the Aaron and Jake Time Travel Adventure - The Inverted Cavern - was released by Ridan Publishing. The series is an inspired fusion of Fonseca's childhood experiences growing up near Amish communities in Northern Indiana and the natural curiosity he saw in his four boys.

== Books in print ==
- The Time Cavern, Lulu, Inc. (2008) ISBN 1-60552-010-1, Ridan Publishing (2009) ISBN 0-9825145-1-4
- The Inverted Cavern (Aaron and Jake Time Travel Adventures), Ridan Publishing (2011) ISBN 1-937475-50-6

== Awards and recognition ==
- 2009 National Indie Excellence Award Finalist, Young Adult Category
- Nominated for a 2008 Minnesota Book Award
- Washington Examiner - Top Kids Books for Time Travel
- #1 Amazon tagged book in Juvenile Fiction, Juvenile Adventure, Books for Boys, Amish customer communities
- October 2008 featured book of the month
- Bestselling Fiction Novel List
- Chicgalleria Featured Book
