= Jorge Gestoso =

Uruguayan journalist (born 1951)

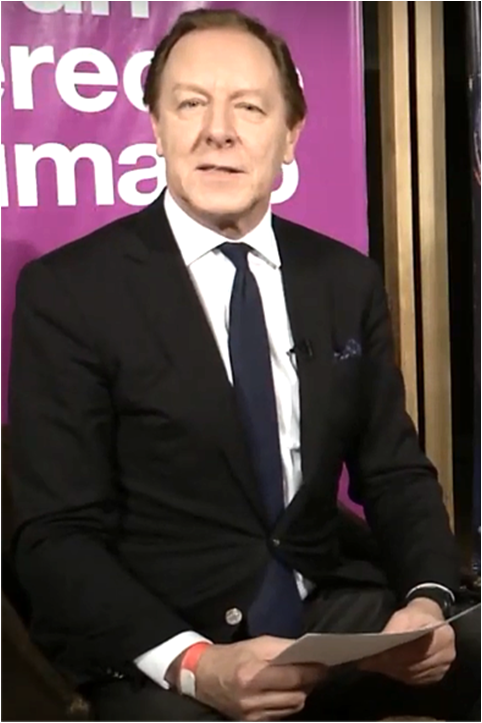
- Jorge Gestoso
- Born: Jorge Gestoso; 20 March 1951 (age 75); Montevideo, Uruguay
- Occupation: Journalist
- Spouse: Caroline Guichard
- Website: Jorge Gestoso's Official Website

Jorge Gestoso (born 20 March 1951) is a Uruguayan journalist who was born in Montevideo.

For 16 years, he was the Principal Anchor and symbol of CNN en Español, as well as Senior Washington Correspondent. CNN en Español is a television network that reaches all the Americas and the Caribbean and is one of the networks of CNN, the Cable News Network, with headquarters in Atlanta, Georgia, North America.

In June 2004, Gestoso founded his own production company of television content, called GTN (Gestoso Television News), holding the title of President, with headquarters in Washington, DC, where he also lives.

Gestoso hosts the program JGI "Jorge Gestoso Investiga" that investigates the most relevant subjects of our times and airs on V-me, with headquarters in New York, on the Spanish Network in association with Public Television, reaching 40 cities and 80% of the Hispanic Market according to Nielsen.

Starting in 2004, from GTN Gestoso has produced and hosted the program Jorge Gestoso, a weekly show that interviews Hispanic newsmakers and which is distributed in the United States, Latin America, parts of Europe, and Asia.

Gestoso has presented many TV programs through GTN, including newsbriefs, interviews, and reports in Spanish. He produced and hosted "Viva Voz con Jorge Gestoso" (Aloud with Jorge Gestoso) from March 2007 until April 2010. This program was broadcast through V-me.

GTN has produced reports on Sustainable Development and the key subjects of the reality of Central America for the Alliance of Communicators COM+, integrated, among others, by BBC, Reuters, and the World Bank. His reports were broadcast in Costa Rica, El Salvador, Guatemala, Honduras, Nicaragua, and Panama.

Gestoso has been invited to act as Master of Ceremony in several International Events -among them - the World Congress on Communication for Development organized jointly by United Nations' FAO, The World Bank and The Communication Initiative Network in Rome, Italy. In March 2012, he was invited by the Organization of American States (OEA) to be the Master of Ceremony of the Private Sector Forum in Preparation for the VI Summit of the Americas. In June 2011 he was invited by the United Nations to act as the Moderator for the Latin America Regional Dialogue of the Global Commission on HIV and the Law in São Paulo, Brazil. Also, in 2011, Gestoso moderated the two Presidential Debates in Guatemala hosted by the AGG (Guatemala's Managers Association). He was the Master of Ceremony of BUPA's Annual Convention in Bangkok, Thailand in April 2010. In October 2012, he gave a Lecture at the Universidad del Este, Paraguay on Journalism, Science and Technology. In March 2011, at George Washington University, Gestoso gave the Seminar "The role of Media in electoral campaigns".

In 2009, Gestoso gave the Seminar "Panorama of the Americas" hosted by Guatemala's Managers Association - AGG - in Guatemala City.

== Education ==
Gestoso attended his studies in the University of the Republic, in Montevideo, Uruguay. Later he attended graduate school at Willow Glen, San Jose, California. In addition to his native Spanish, he also speaks English and French.

== Career ==
Gestoso has been declared one of the one hundred more influential Hispanic journalists in the United States. He has received several awards, like the historic DuPont's silver batton for excellence in investigative journalism, granted by Columbia University in the City of New York for his work on “En busca de la doble desaparecida” on CNN en Espanol (In search of the double missing) and it was the first- language program abroad (other than English) in obtaining this award. This program also received INTE award and the International Emmy nominations for best documentary of the year. Also, he was distinguished as the best presenter of news by the three American organizations of Hispanic critics: ACE, ACC and ACRIN. He was also awarded as “the personality of news of the year” by the INTE (Industry of Television in Spanish). In addition, he was given the prizes "Jean Cartier" in Argentina and “Tabaré de Oro” in Uruguay. On the other hand, the Technological University of El Salvador named him “Professor Meritísimo”.

== Personal life ==
Gestoso lives in Washington DC, along with his wife, Caroline Guichard, who is of French nationality. His parents and brother live in Montevideo, Uruguay, South America.

== Interviews ==
Gestoso has interviewed many political, cultural, and artistic figures, among others. The most outstanding interviews throughout his career have been:

- Julian Assange, Founder of Wikileaks
- Ingrid Betancourt, FARC' hostage and Colombia's Presidential Candidate
- Bill Clinton, President of the United States
- Fidel Castro, President of Cuba
- Jimmy Carter, Former President of the United States
- Hugo Chávez President of Venezuela
- Jose Miguel Insulza, OAS' Secretary General
- Ali Rodriguez, UNASUR' Secretary General
- Vicente Fox, President of Mexico
- Rafael Correa, President of Ecuador
- Antonio Saca, President of El Salvador
- Jose Mujica, President of Uruguay
- Eliane Karp de Toledo, First Lady of Peru
- Enrique Bolanos, President of Nicaragua
- Evo Morales, President of Bolivia
- Gonzalo Sanchez de Lozada, Former President of Bolivia
- Miguel Ángel Rodríguez, OAS' General Secretary of OEA
- Vivian Fernández de Torrijos, First Lady of Panama
- Marcelo Tinelli, TV host, entrepreneur and Argentinian producer of Television and Radio
- Cecilia Bolocco, Former Miss Universe
- Sylvia R. Mata, President of League of United Latin American Citizens Queens Council
