= Gana la Verde =

2004 American game show

Gana la Verde (also known as Win the Green) was a controversial game show which first aired in 2004 that promised the contestants (would-be immigrants to the US) legal help with getting a green card. There was a mild controversy when the advertising suggested that a green card would be the automatic prize for the victor. The events on the show, often testing a character's stomach or willpower, were similar to Fear Factor, another controversial game show that aired at the same time.

The program played on third-party Spanish-language channels in Los Angeles, San Diego, Houston, and Dallas. The program was created by Lenard Liberman, executive vice president of Liberman Broadcasting. The show was produced and directed by Spanish-language producer Adrian Vallarino (El Show de Don Cheto) and hosted by Mexican action sports personality George X. The show wrapped production after its third season at the beginning of 2005 but re-runs were still being aired once a week as of September 2007.
