= Graciana del Castillo =

Uruguayan economist, writer, and businesswoman (died 2019)

- Born: Uruguay
- Died: New York City
- Organization: Macroeconomics Advisory Group

Academic background
- Education: Columbia University

Graciana del Castillo (Uruguay - New York City, March 22, 2019) was a Uruguayan economist, professor, writer, businesswoman, and international strategist. At the age of nineteen, she settled in New York City, United States. She studied economics, and received her master's and doctorate degrees at Columbia University, where she was also a professor. She worked at the United Nations International Monetary Fund, specializing in designing economic policies for El Salvador, Kosovo and Afghanistan. She co-founded the consulting firm Macroeconomics Advisory Group (MAG) with Mario Blejer.

== Selected works ==
She was the author of the books:

- 2008, Rebuilding War Torn States
- 2011, Redrawing the Lines
- 2013, Guilty Part. The International Community in Afghanistan
