= Hospital Saint Bois =

Coordinates: 34°47′16″S 56°14′29″W

Geography
- Location: Camino Fauquet 6358, Villa Colón, Montevideo, Uruguay

Organisation
- Care system: Public
- Type: General and Eye Hospital

Services
- Emergency department: Yes 24 hours

Helipads
- Helipad: No

History
- Founded: 18 November 1928

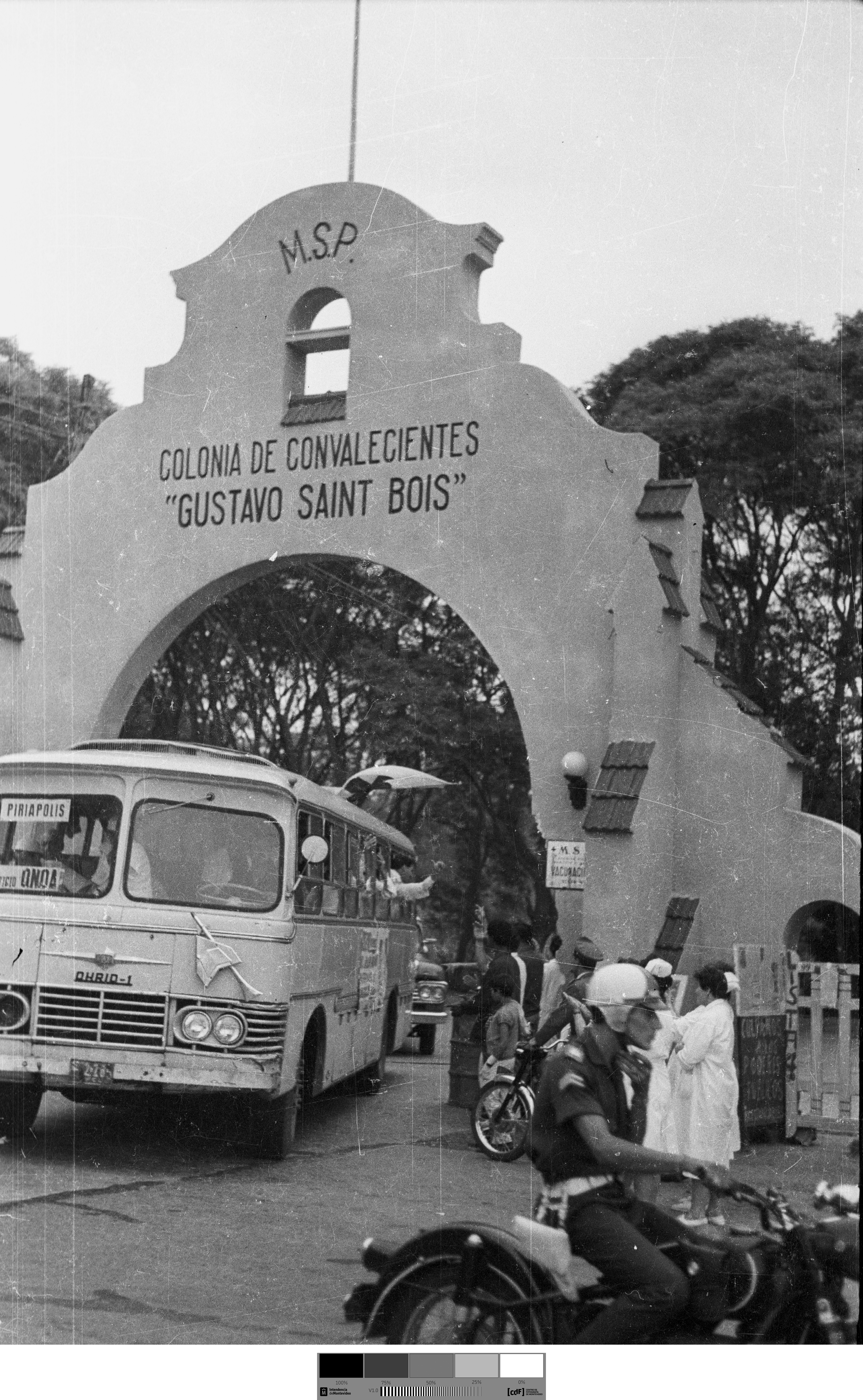
Public health workers mobilize amidst a dispute over sector demands at Saint Bois Hospital, 1967

Hospital Saint Bois is a hospital located at Camino Fauquet 6358, Villa Colón on the northwestern outskirts of Montevideo, Uruguay. It consists of a General Hospital and Eye Hospital. It was founded on November 18, 1928, and once exhibited murals designed by Joaquín Torres García.

== See also ==
- Joaquin Torres-Garcia
- The murals of the Saint Bois Hospital
