= Alceu Ribeiro =

Uruguayan painter and sculptor (1919–2013)

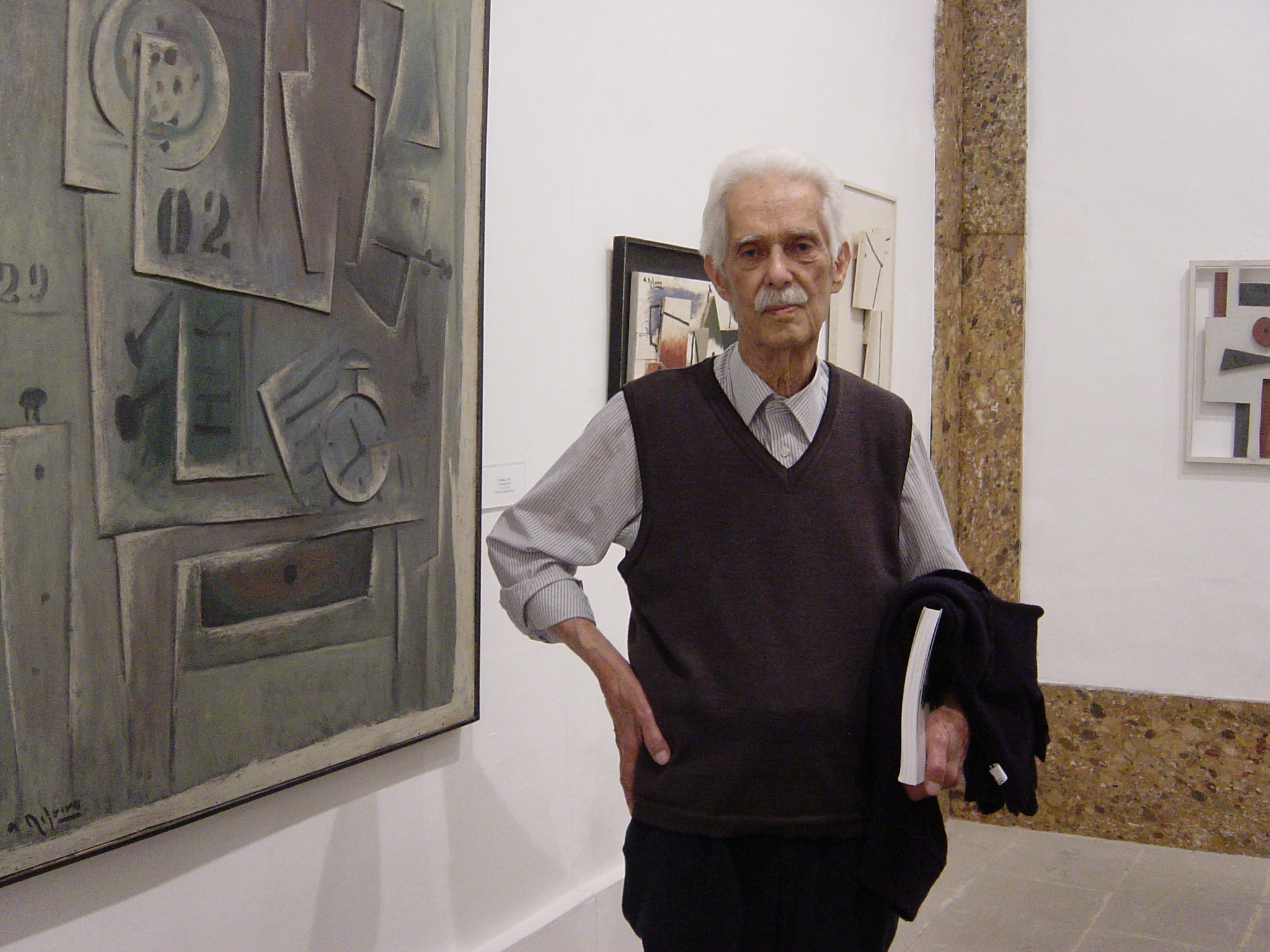
Alceu Ribeiro at Palau Solleric, 2006.

Alceu Ribeiro (13 December 1919 in Artigas Department – 22 November 2013 in Palma, Majorca) was a Uruguayan painter and sculptor.
