= Carlos Eduardo Espina =

Uruguayan-American immigrant rights activist

- Espina in 2025
- Born: 1998 (age 27–28); Montevideo, Uruguay
- Years active: 2020–present
- Known for: Spanish-language political commentary and immigrant rights activism

Instagram information
- Page: Carlos Eduardo Espina

TikTok information
- Page: Carlos Eduardo Espina
- Website: www.carloseduardoespina.com

Carlos Eduardo Espina is an Uruguayan-American immigrant rights activist, social media influencer, and political commentator based in Houston, Texas. He began posting videos about the U.S. citizenship test in 2020 and went on to cover immigration, politics, and current events in Spanish.

Espina founded the nonprofit Migrantes Unidos and spoke at the 2024 Democratic National Convention. During the 2026 midterm campaign, he worked with the campaigns of James Talarico and Gina Hinojosa to reach Spanish-speaking voters in Texas.

== Early life and education ==
Espina was born in Montevideo to a Uruguayan father and a Mexican mother. He moved to Texas at age five and grew up in College Station. He graduated from Vassar College in 2020, where he studied political science and Latin American and Latino studies. He earned a law degree from the William S. Boyd School of Law at the University of Nevada, Las Vegas, in 2024.

== Community work and immigration advocacy ==
Espina founded Football for the Future, which began offering free soccer camps for children in Bryan–College Station in 2017. In 2019, while at Vassar, he established the Detained Refugee Solidarity Fund to support people in U.S. Immigration and Customs Enforcement detention. He corresponded with detainees and sent some of them money so they could call their families. Some of the correspondence was displayed at Vassar in an exhibition titled Dear Carlos: Mail from a Detention Complex.

In February 2022, Espina used TikTok to organize a Day Without Immigrants campaign. The campaign encouraged immigrants to stay home from work to highlight their role in the U.S. economy. Demonstrators gathered near the White House to call for immigration reform and a path to citizenship for undocumented immigrants.

Espina founded Migrantes Unidos in 2022. The nonprofit offers citizenship classes, English courses, and college workshops. In 2026, the Houston Chronicle reported that Espina ran a Houston community center that provided legal and educational services to immigrants.

Espina contributed $50,000 in September 2026 to launch an emergency fund for families affected by immigration raids in Doral, Florida.

== Media career ==
Espina volunteered with the Brazos Interfaith Immigration Network, helping immigrants prepare for the U.S. citizenship test. During the COVID-19 pandemic, he moved his classes online, first on Facebook and then on TikTok. He expanded his Spanish-language videos to cover changes in immigration policy and breaking news. In March 2026, The New Yorker reported that he had approximately 22.5 million followers across TikTok, Instagram, Facebook, and YouTube.

Espina released the documentary Estados Detenidos in March 2026. It features testimony from families separated by U.S. immigration enforcement during the second Trump administration.

== Political activity ==
In June 2024, Espina recorded a video with President Joe Biden about immigration measures affecting mixed-status families and recipients of Deferred Action for Childhood Arrivals. On August 21, 2024, he spoke at the Democratic National Convention in Chicago about immigrants' contributions to the United States.

=== 2026 Texas voter outreach ===
Ahead of the March 2026 Texas primaries, Espina took part in the Houston launch of RUIDO, an initiative by the Congressional Hispanic Caucus's political arm to reach Latino voters through social media creators. During early voting, he posted videos encouraging people to vote. He endorsed James Talarico in the Democratic U.S. Senate primary and appeared in a Spanish-language campaign advertisement for him.

During the general election campaign, Espina worked with Talarico's Senate campaign and Gina Hinojosa's campaign for governor as part of their outreach to Spanish-speaking voters. On November 3, he told Morning Joe that people who had never voted before had contacted him to ask how to vote. Talarico and Hinojosa won their respective races.

=== Tom Steyer campaign ===
Espina at the Knight Foundation Media Forum in 2026

Tom Steyer's 2026 campaign for governor of California paid Espina $400,000, according to campaign disclosures reported by Semafor. A complaint over campaign-related social media posts alleged that videos by Espina and other creators lacked required advertising disclosures. Steyer's campaign said it had hired Espina as a strategic adviser on Latino voter outreach and that he had posted about Steyer on his own initiative.

== Recognition ==
- 2024 Premios Juventud – Creador que me inspira (Creator That Inspires Me)
- 2026 Voto Latino Foundation – Our Voices Campeón Award
