= Francisco Fattoruso =

Uruguayan musician and bass player

Francisco Fattoruso (born August 10, 1979, in Las Vegas, Nevada) is a Uruguayan musician and bass player.

He is the son of Hugo Fattoruso and Brazilian María de Fátima Quinhões, both of them musicians.

He has played with several artists such as: Rubén Rada, Illya Kuryaki and the Valderramas, Abuela Coca, Pepe Guerra, Silicon Fly, Warren Riker, Dante, Emmanuel Horvilleur, Deitrick Hadden, Liliana Herrero, Milton Nascimento, Elefante, NN Opera, La Trampa, Molotov, Oteil Burbridge, Derek Trucks, Blueground Undergrass, Gary Buho Gazaway, David Haynes, Yonrico Scott, Silk, Philipia, Malachi, Lazyeye, Reggie Hines, Ike Stubblefield, Charly García, Right On, Tim McDonald, Elizabeth Baptist Church, Tabernacle Baptist Church, The Soul Factory, Voices Of Faith, Claudio Taddei, Hugo Fattoruso, Anita no Duerme, Jorge Drexler, Daniel Drexler.

== Discography ==
- Trío Fattoruso (2001)
- Cleptodonte
- Trío Fattoruso En vivo en Medio y Medio (2005)
- Bacteria
- Francisco Fattoruso
- The House of the Groove (2007)
- Music Adventure (2013)
- Khronos (2016)
