= Daniel Pontet =

Uruguayan-born artist working in the US (born 1957)

- Born: 1957; Montevideo, Uruguay
- Died: April 11, 2022 (aged 65); South Florida, United States
- Education: Garino's Art Studio (Drawing, Painting, 1981), Art History, School of Humanities, University of the Republic (1987–1988), Sculpture/Welding, Art Center South Florida (1997)
- Known for: Painting, mixed media,
- Notable work: Metamorphosis series, mural for Heineken Hispanic Mural Program (Miami, 2004)
- Style: symbolism, expressionism Realism
- Movement: Latin American contemporary art
- Awards: First Prize, Heineken Hispanic Mural Program (2004) Miami, Second Prize, Hispanic Heritage Month Art Contest (2004) Columbus, OH, Best Original Art Work, Annual Awards Competition, AFCP (2003) Las Vegas

Daniel Pontet (1957-April 11, 2022) was a Uruguayan-born artist working in the U.S.

== Biography ==
=== Early life ===
Pontet was born in Montevideo, Uruguay, South America, and resided in South Florida, USA from 1991 until his sudden passing on April 11, 2022. Pontet developed artistically in Uruguay, under watercolor painter and art teacher Esteban Garino – who taught him the art of drawing and composition - and under artists Americo Sposito and Hector Laborde, who instilled into him the magic of color and a particular emphasis on space and shapes. He also completed courses in Art History at the School of Humanities of the University of the Republic of Uruguay. Furthermore, he studied silkscreen, photography, and computer graphics as a complement to his art education and honed his skills while working as a graphic artist at The Flyer during the mid-90s and early 2000s.

=== Career ===
The earliest stage of Pontet's work can be placed within the expressionist and the neo expressionist circles and during this time he uses drawing as a fundamental element. He opens and closes spaces and organizes his balance and refuge in the canvass with grace and strength, as well as drama and lyricism. In this period, he devotes most of his energy and power of expression to depicting a world of indifferent, dauntless, and forlorn characters. Pontet stirs these meditative beings with an expressionist glare, manifesting a deep and underlying reflection on the human condition. He also creates unique rhythmical and chromatic consonances throughout these motifs. Pontet's early series share outstanding traits characterized by accomplished drawing, well thought-out compositions, mathematically precise structures, distortions and deliberate elongations, as well as the use of a rich polychrome palette of tones and hues.

During the early 2000s, he developed a period of work known as "Metamorphosis", which incorporated symbolic imagery and elements ranging from realism to abstraction. The series included compositions and collages created on two- and three-dimensional surfaces. These works featured materials such as soil-based pigments, keys, nails, washers, fabric, and threads. Themes related to spirituality and reflection have been associated with this period of his work.

Daniel Pontet started exhibiting in 1975 and participated in more than 200 art shows. He received several prizes and acknowledgments and showed his creativity had no end. Effort and devotion were his most precious tools along with truthfulness.

As the Chilean writer Antonio Landauro once said about Daniel Pontet: “It goes without saying that this creative artist, like all genuine artists, always attained self-expression, whether he was understood, half understood, or not at all.”

== Education ==
- Sculpture -Welding- Sardi's Studio. Art Center South Florida. Miami Beach - FL, 1997.
- Fine Art Studies. Lucia Ametrano Art Gallery. Montevideo - Uruguay, 1988.
- Art History Courses. School of Humanities, University of the Republic. Montevideo - Uruguay, 1987-1988.
- Photography -Basic and Advanced- Ateneo de Montevideo. Montevideo - Uruguay, 1983-1984.
- Drawing and Painting, Garino's Art Studio. Montevideo - Uruguay, 1981.
- Silk-Screen, UTU. Montevideo - Uruguay, 1979.
- Advertising and Artistic Drawing, Garino's Art Studio. Montevideo - Uruguay, 1976-1977.

== Activities related to education ==
- Art Teacher. Pontet's Art Studio. Miami - FL, 1997-1998.
- Art Teacher. Pontet's Art Studio. Montevideo - Uruguay, 1987-1990.
- Advertising Teacher, Ateneo de Montevideo. Montevideo - Uruguay, 1982.

== Acknowledgments ==
Miami Dade College. Miami - FL, 1998. Honor student. Outstanding Academic Achievement. Membership at the Honor Society Phi Theta Kappa. Recognition at National Dean's List - US.

== Awards ==
- Second Prize. Hispanic Heritage Month Art Contest, Nationwide. Columbus - OH, 2004.
- First Prize Miami. Heineken Hispanic Mural Program. Heineken & GenArt. Reprod. at Flagler St. & 27 Ave. Miami – FL, 2004.
- First, Second, and Third Place. Best Original Art Work. Annual Awards Competition, AFCP. Las Vegas – NV, 2003.
- Honorable Mention. New Trends#1. Ralb & Co. Fine Art. Miami - FL, 2001.
- Honorable Mention. 14th Annual Hispanic Heritage Festival. Nations Bank Building. Miami - FL, 1998.
- Honorable Mention. Las Americas. The Florida Museum of Hispanic and Latin American Art. Coral Gables - FL, 1998.
- Third Prize. Nuestro Arte. Johnnie Walker. Miami - FL, 1996.
- First Prize. Design Competition. Victoria Plaza Hotel. Montevideo - Uruguay, 1987.
- Special Mention. 3rd Young Artists Show. Coca-Cola and Pluna. Montevideo - Uruguay, 1987.
- Mention. 3rd Spring Salon. Anglo-Uruguayan Cultural Institute. Montevideo – Uruguay, 1985.
- Mention. 2nd Youth Christian Art Competition. Montevideo - Uruguay, 1985.
- Honorable Mention. 2nd Spring Salon. Anglo-Uruguayan Cultural Institute. Montevideo - Uruguay, 1984.

== Stages ==
- 2004 – Present: SYMBOLISM. Metamorphosis: A new artistic stage. Incrusted objects become symbols. Reflections and thoughts as maps with colors extracted from the soil.
- 1987–2004: EXPRESSIONISM. Distortions and deliberated elongations. A polychrome palette of tones and hues.
- 1975–1987: REALISM. Earliest stage. Light and shadows. Particular emphasis on drawing.

== Bibliography ==
- 'Landscapes and Mysteries' by Mariela Murdocco. Banda Oriental Latinoamerica. New York/New Jersey (USA). Year XV, No. 184. Sept 2008 (pp 20–21)
- 'Campos y Misterios' (Landscapes and Mysteries) Exhibition Catalogue. Consulate General of Uruguay. New York, NY (USA) August 2008 (pp 2–4)
- 'Beautiful Minds' MDC Magazine. Miami, FL (USA) MDC. Vol 7, Number 1, Winter 2007. (pp 64–67)
- 'Gallery. Uruguayan Art' by Arturo Arias-Polo. El Nuevo Herald. Miami, FL (USA) August 16, 2007. (Sec D, pg 9)
- 'Arts and Entertainments. Southern Cousins' by Greg Baker. New Times. Miami, FL (USA) August 16–22, 2007. (pg 32)
- 'Pontet: The Spell of Tradition” by A. Landauro. 'Candombe and Boliches' Art Show Catalogue. Consulate Gral. of Uruguay. New York, NY 1996 (pp 2–3)
- 'Art and its Conception' by Daniel Pontet. Osmus. Vol. 4, No. 18. Miami, FL 1996 (pp 40–41/97-99)
