= Carlos Torres-Machado =

Ecuadorian visual artist

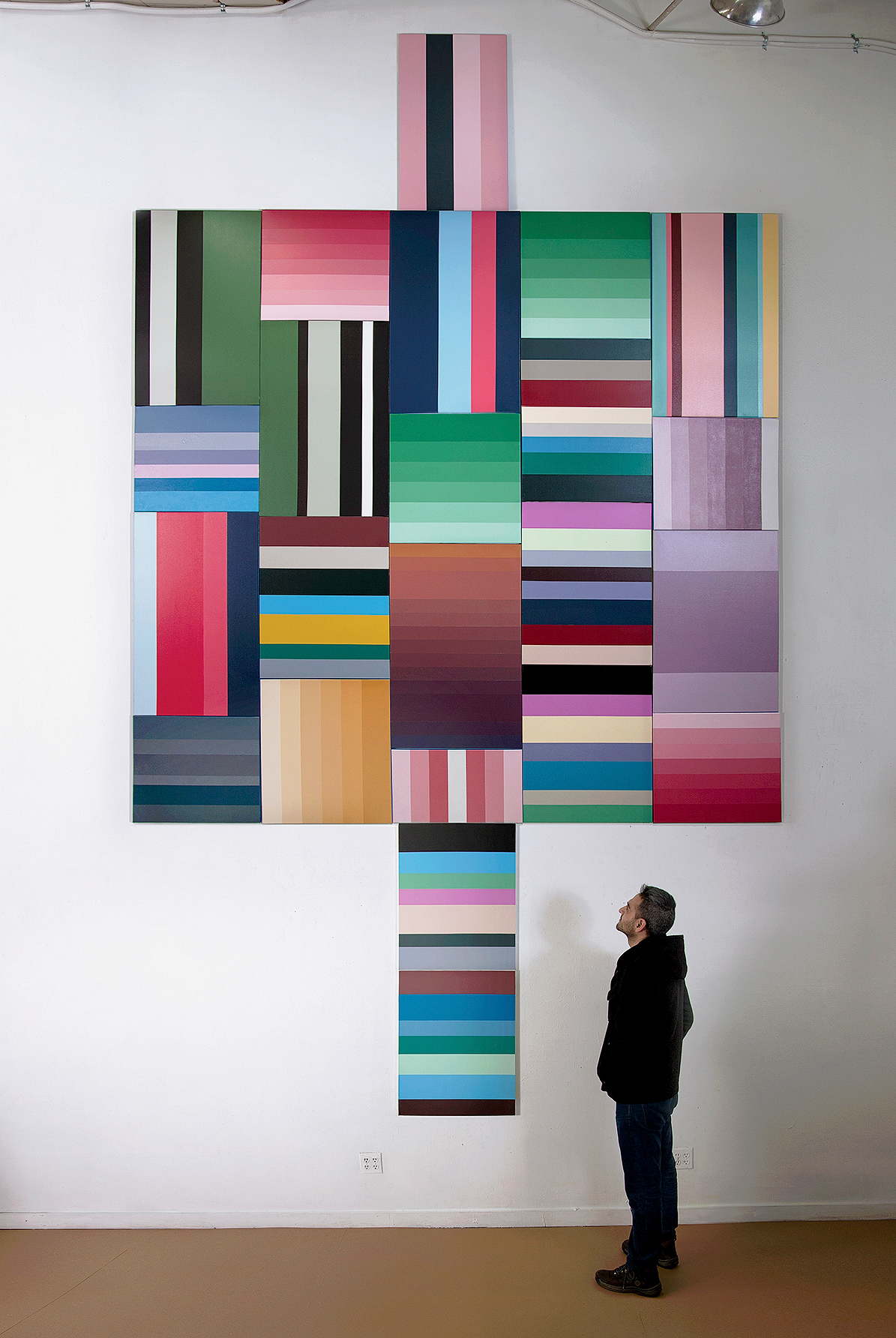
- The artist in front of his artwork installation in New York
- Born: Ecuador
- Education: Universidad Nacional de las Artes, Universidad San Francisco de Quito
- Occupations: Visual artist, CEO and Co-founder of ArteLatAm
- Employer: ArteLatAm
- Children: 1
- Website: https://www.torresmachado.com/

Carlos Torres-Machado is an Ecuadorian visual artist. He is the current CEO and Co-founder of ArteLatAm, an arts organization dedicated to creating high-impact art experiences through educational programs, murals, and public art projects that elevate Latino talent and transform communities. It has its headquarters in Queens, New York.

== Personal life ==
Torres-Machado was born in Ecuador. Since a very young age, he expressed his love towards art and other disciplines of interest. In 2012, Torres-Machado moved to New York City to further develop his career as an artist. He lives together with his wife and kid in New York City.

== Professional career ==
Carlos Torres-Machado graduated with a B.F.A. in Contemporary Arts, Communication, Photography, and Psychology from the Universidad Nacional de las Artes, and Universidad San Francisco de Quito. Ever since he moved to New York, he has held exhibitions in Europe, Latin America, and major international biennials. In 2017, he was awarded as the New York Regional winner of the Bombay Sapphire Artisan Series. Torres-Machado has experience as a photographer. His abstract artworks are mostly characterized by their variety of color and the use of geometrical language.

After succeeding in the Latin American art market of New York, Torres-Machado decided that it was highly important to share some of his success, and founded ArteLatAm. Created as a support platform for Latin American visual artists, the organization has evolved into a multidisciplinary model that drives community transformation through educational programs, murals, and high-impact public art projects.
