= Enrique Graf =

Uruguayan-American pianist

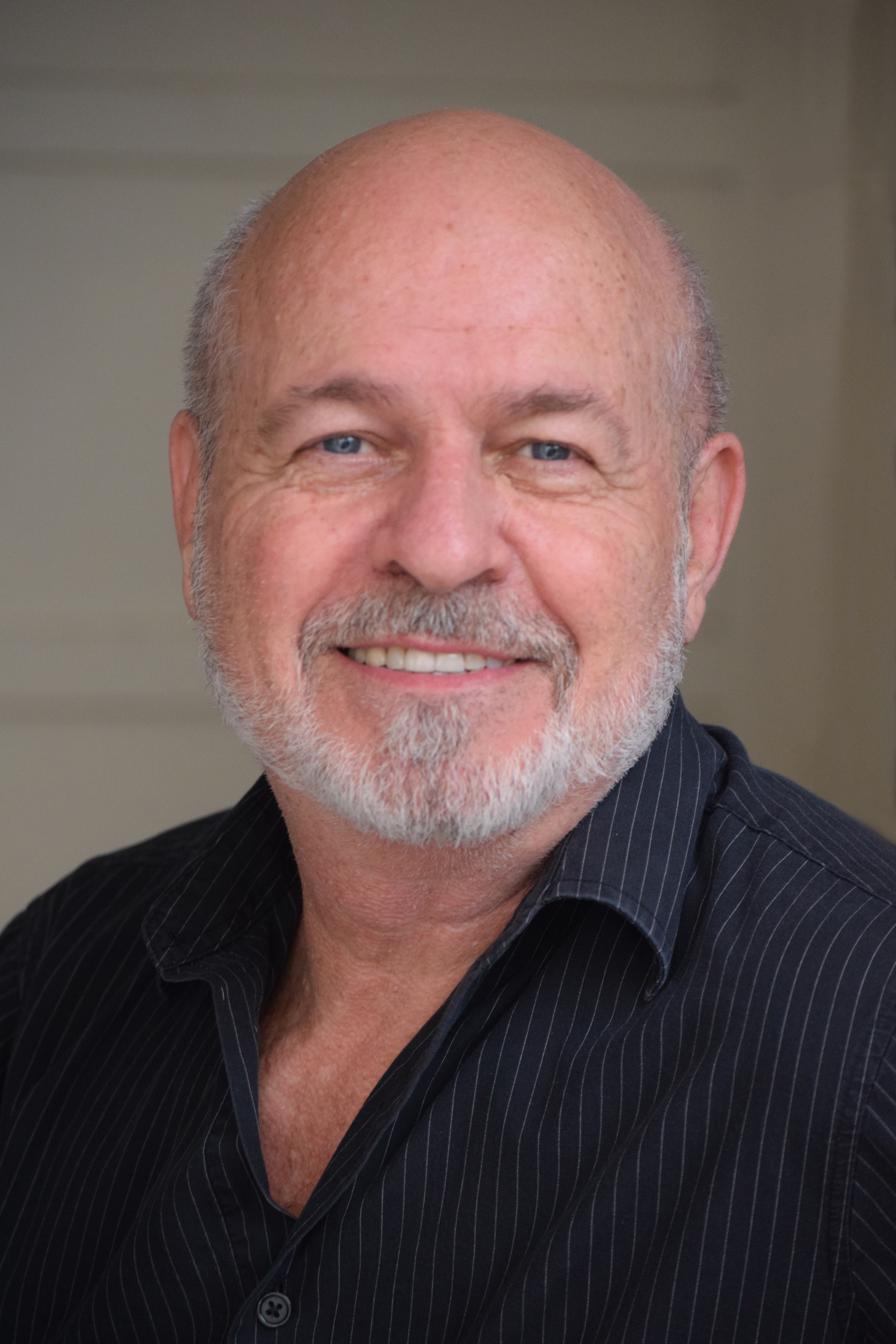

Background information
- Born: July 18, 1953 (age 72); Montevideo, Uruguay
- Genres: Classical
- Occupation: Classical Pianist
- Instrument: Piano
- Labels: Centaur, Cougar Classics, Intersound, Carlton Classics
- Website: EnriqueGraf.com

Enrique Graf (born 1953) is a Uruguayan-American pianist.

== Biography ==
Born in Montevideo, Uruguay, Graf began studying piano at the age of four with his mother. He then studied at the Falleri-Balzo Conservatory. After winning all of the national competitions in Uruguay, he was awarded a full scholarship from the Peabody Conservatory of the Johns Hopkins University and the Organization of American States to study with Leon Fleisher in 1973.

Graf won First Prize in the William Kapell International Piano Competition in 1978, the National Ensemble Piano Competition in 1977 and the East and West International Competition in New York in 1981.

He has given recitals all over the world and has been featured as soloist with the orchestras of Baltimore, Indianapolis, New Jersey, Nashville, Pittsburgh, Richmond, Florida, West Virginia, Illinois, Flagstaff, Macon, Ft. Lauderdale, Augusta, Greenville, Charleston, Tucumán, Concepción, Rosario, New York City and Jupiter Symphonies, the Symphony of the Americas, the National Chamber Orchestra, the Illinois Chamber Orchestra, Chamber Orchestra of the Triangle, the American Chamber Orchestra, the Hudson Valley Philharmonic, Sinfonia da Camara, South Carolina Philharmonic, Florida Virtuosi Orchestra, the Puerto Rico Symphony, the Montevideo Philharmonic, the Lviv Philharmonic, the Moscow Philharmonic, the Janacek Philharmonic in the Czech Republic, and the national orchestras of Ukraine, Chile, Uruguay, Peru and Colombia.

Additionally, he has appeared at Lincoln Center, Kennedy Center, National Gallery of Art, Krannert Center, Weill Recital Hall at Carnegie Hall, St. Martin in the Fields in London, New York’s DiMenna Center and Symphony Space, Cultural Centers of Manila and São Paulo, Teatro Opera in Buenos Aires, Broward Center for the Performing Arts in Florida, South Bay Center for the Arts in Los Angeles, Chautauqua Festival, Young Keyboard Artists International Festival in Ann Arbor, San Miguel de Allende Chamber Music Festival and the Sala Beethoven International Festival in Mexico, University of Maryland and University of Houston International Piano Festivals, Spoleto International Piano Festival and Music Fest Perugia in Italy, Festival de Natal, Santa Maria and Vale Veneto in Brazil, Mozarteum Argentino, “Contrasts” Festival in Lviv and Kyiv Music Fest in Ukraine.

As a chamber musician Graf has toured with Cuarteto Latinoamericano, the Ives Quartet, the Baltimore Wind Ensemble, the American Chamber Players, the Prague Wind Quintet and the Apollo String Quartet.

Graf has performed concertos by Bach, Haydn, Mozart, all five and the Triple by Beethoven, Brahms, Mendelssohn, Liszt, Franck, Tchaikovsky, Grieg, Rachmaninoff, Ravel, Poulenc, Gershwin, De Falla, Turina, Shostakovich, and Lee Hoiby. He gave the world premiere of Florencia Di Concilio’s Piano Concerto, Edward Hart’s Tidal Concerto, and performed and recorded for Naxos a concerto by Leonardo Balada.

An all Poulenc CD with the Charleston Symphony was a pick of the week by the Sunday London Times and was awarded five stars in Classic CD. His debut recording Enrique Graf plays Bach was called "An end to the discussion of whether or not Bach should be played on the piano" by Paul Hume of the Washington Post. Other recordings of Mozart Sonatas, Mendelssohn and Bach Variations, Mussorgsky’s Pictures at an Exhibition, the Liszt Sonata, the Grieg Concerto, Edward Hart’s Tidal Concerto, Gershwin’s Concerto in F and two Beethoven Concertos have received such praise as "ideal performances" (Fanfare). His latest CDs include a “live” recital with works by Mozart, Beethoven, Chopin, Rachmaninoff, Gershwin, Debussy and Tosar and one with violinist Cecilia Penadés with works by Piazzolla, Villa Lobos, Guastavino, Ponce, Fabini and Ginastera.

Graf taught for fourteen years at the Peabody Preparatory, where he became chairman of the piano department and received the Director's Award for Outstanding Teaching. At the University of Charleston, he developed a highly regarded piano program, earning the Distinguished Research Award and the title of University Artist in Residence. He also served as Artist Lecturer at Carnegie Mellon University.

His students have won many national and international competitions. He has been a member of the jury in competitions all over the world and has given master classes at Yale University, Oberlin and Eastman Conservatories, the Shanghai and Kyiv Conservatories, the Hong Kong Academy for the Performing Arts, Korea’s National University, Federal University of São Paulo and many other schools throughout the world.

Graf is Founder and Artistic Director of the Festival Internacional de Colonia in Uruguay, Directed the International Piano Series in Charleston and the Young Artist Series in the Piccolo Spoleto Festival and co-founded Music Fest Perugia in Italy.

He has been awarded a Fellowship from the Aspen Institute Executive Seminar, the Music Fellowship from the South Carolina Arts Commission, Career Grants from the Charles Del Mar and Astral Foundations, and the Immigrant Achievement Award in 2000 from the American Immigration Law Foundation.
