= Adrian Vallarino =

Uruguayan producer, director, journalist and cinematographer

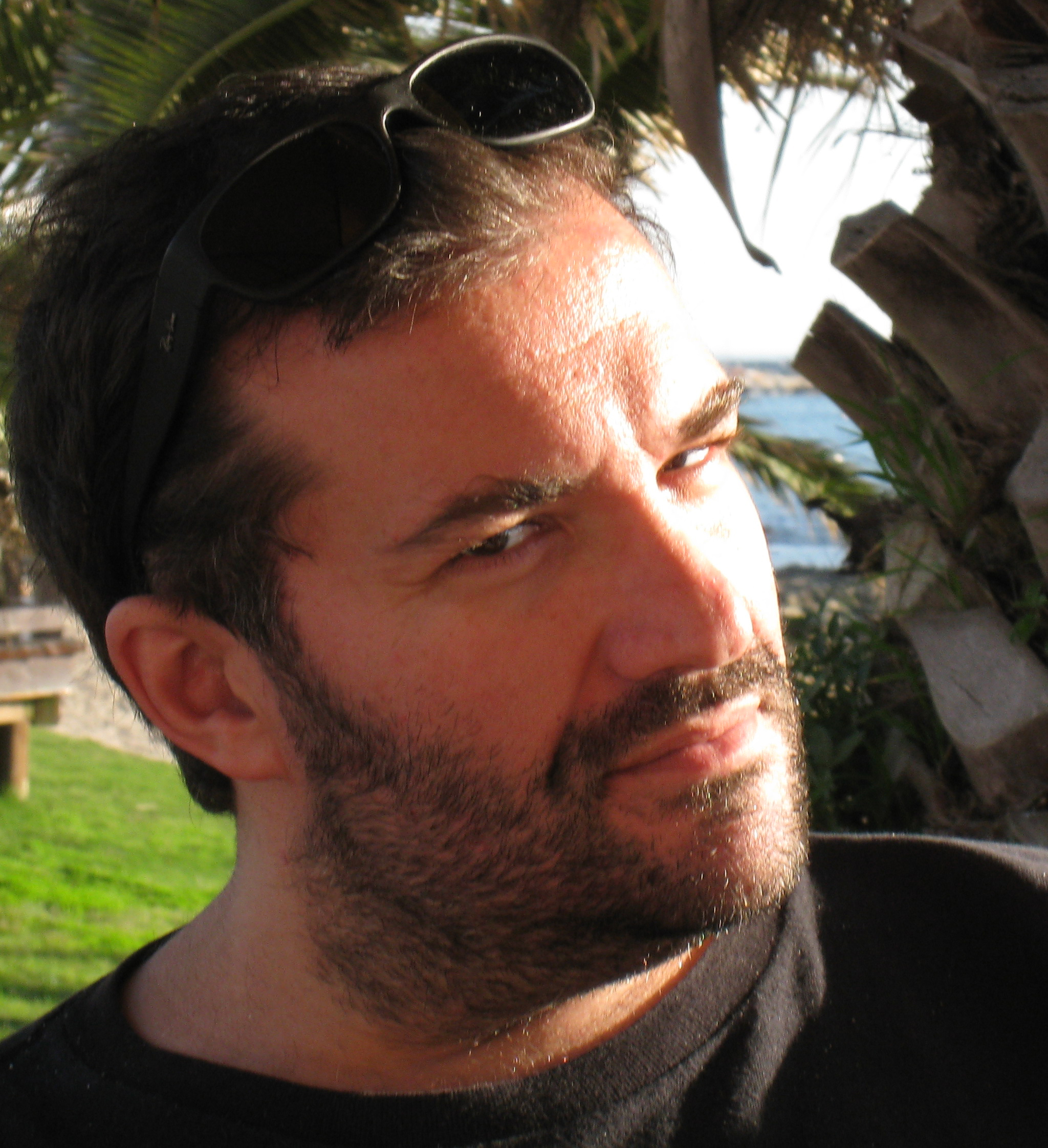
- Adrian Vallarino
- Born: Adrian Fabio Vallarino Chiossi; July 19, 1968 (age 58); Montevideo, Uruguay
- Occupations: Film director, producer, cinematographer, journalist
- Years active: 1982–present

Adrian Fabio Vallarino Chiossi (born July 19, 1968) is an Uruguayan television and film, producer and director, journalist and cinematographer. Vallarino's career started at the early age of 12 during the 1980 Mundialito, where he worked as a cameraman assistant. In 2004 and 2005 Vallarino produced and directed the Fear Factor-like series Gana la Verde for Liberman Broadcasting in Los Angeles, where winning contestants were promised legal representation to help them pursue a Green Card. During his long career Vallarino has been awarded multiple awards and recognitions.

== Early life ==
Vallarino was born in Montevideo, Uruguay, on July 19, 1968. The son of TV producer Jorge Vallarino and TV reporter Stella Chiossi. From an early age Vallarino got involved in the TV and cinema business through his family's production company. During the celebrations of the 50th anniversary of the FIFA World Cup, Vallarino received his first press credential as an assistant cameraman to cover the 1980 Mundialito. Vallarino was 12 at the time. Two years later, in 1982, during the Falklands War, Vallarino was one of the few journalists in Uruguay who were fully bi-lingual and collaborated with UPITN (United Press International Television News) as well as other local media outlets translating and interviewing UK soldiers that were brought injured to Montevideo.

== Career in Uruguay ==
During the 1980s and early 1990s, Vallarino alternated between his studies and work for his family's production company collaborating in different productions for WTN (now Associated Press Television News), the BBC, CNN and other international and local TV networks. During this time he has the opportunity to work with worldwide renowned journalists like BBC's John Simpson, CNN's Jorge Gestoso and Univision's Fernando Fiore, among others.

In 1989 Vallarino was the senior producer of the media coverage for Luis Alberto Lacalle's presidential campaign that ended with Lacalle winning the 1989 national election and becoming president of Uruguay.

During the remaining of the 1990s Vallarino continued to work for various international TV news outlets covering the news in Uruguay as well as producing a series of documentaries, shorts and local TV shows.

In 1999 Vallarino took over the production of local news network Cable Canal 6 and ran their news operations until the end of 2002.

== Career in the United States ==
In early 2003 Vallarino migrated to Los Angeles to further pursue his TV career. That same year he started working at Estrella TV (formerly Channel 62) producing Buscando Amor and later that year Segunda Cita. Both shows were later united by Vallarino in a single production that went to have a long run and performed well in ratings. A year later Estrella TV launched the very successful and controversial show Gana la Verde, with Vallarino being the series' senior producer and director. The next 3 1/2 years Vallarino worked producing, launching and directing a wide variety of shows for Estrella TV: Secretos, El Show de Don Cheto, A que no puedes, Jose Luis sin Censura, among others. After leaving Estrella TV in late 2007 Vallarino became an independent producer working for various production companies and networks. That same year he also directed the short drama The Son based on Horacio Quiroga's short story. In 2008 Vallarino directed the feature-length comedy Banda Girls: Who's your Sugar Daddy. During this time he also produced and directed commercials and shows for FOX (Los Angeles), KCAL-TV, Univision and others. While working in Los Angeles, Vallarino was invited to teach at the Columbia College Hollywood, where he became a professor in TV production and direction. Vallarino is also co-founder of Beverly Hills based production company Rauko Productions LLC.

== Return to Uruguay ==
In July 2008 Vallarino returned to Uruguay and became the news manager (aka news director) for Monte Carlo TV Network. During his three-year tenure at Monte Carlo Vallarino reorganized the news department, launched and produced 5 new shows and took every news show in the network to number one in ratings (source Mediciones y Mercados). One of the shows launched by Vallarino was "Uruguay Decide", Uruguay's first Sunday Morning news and political analysis show. In 2011 Adrian left Monte Carlo to return to help in his family's company (VAL Video Productions) and further pursue his international career in Argentina, Chile and Spain.

In late 2012 Vallarino returned briefly to the US to produce and launch a couple of shows for Liberman Broadcasting. After the shows went to air Adrian returned to Uruguay and assumed a position in the board of directors at Vision Canaria the cable provider company he co-owns (https://visioncanaria.com.uy), he was also appointed as the Programing Director of the company's local TV station.

== Personal life ==
Vallarino is son of Uruguayan TV pioneer Jorge Vallarino and brother to international model and TV host Virginia Vallarino.

Raul Vallarino, best selling author and former director of Uruguay's National Library is Adrian's uncle and godfather.

From 2002 to 2008 Vallarino was married to CNN en Español's Karina Dalmas, they divorced in late 2008. On his mother's side Adrian is the great-grand nephew of Maldonado's pioneer and famous Governor (Intendente) Martiniano Chiossi. Adrian is also nephew to Captain (ret) Ariel Chiossi, former commander of Uruguay's flagship vessel Capitan Miranda (ROU schooner).

In 2019 Vallarino became engaged to longtime partner Dr. Mariana Pereyra, a double Ph.D. in chemistry and science education from NCSU and Uruguay's UDELAR.
