= Bruno Fonseca =

American painter and sculptor

- Bruno Fonseca, 1989 (from "Bruno Fonseca: The Secret Life of Painting")
- Born: 1958; New York City, U.S.
- Died: May 31, 1994 (aged 35–36); East Hampton, New York, U.S.
- Known for: Painting, Sculpture
- Notable work: The War Murals
- Movement: Abstract, figurative
- Father: Gonzalo Fonseca
- Relatives: Caio Fonseca (brother); Isabel Fonseca (sister); Quina Fonseca (sister)

Bruno Fonseca (1958 – May 31, 1994) was an American artist who shifted between abstract and figurative styles and worked in both painting and sculpture.

== Biography ==
=== Early life ===
Fonseca was born in New York to a family of artists. His father, Gonzalo Fonseca, was an Uruguayan sculptor. His younger brother Caio Fonseca is a well known contemporary painter. His sister Isabel Fonseca is a writer. Fonseca had dyslexia and a stutter, conditions so severe as a child he was treated by a psychiatrist. Fonseca was able to compensate for his verbal difficulties with a tremendous visual fluency, reproducing paintings by Michelangelo and other Great Masters at an early age. Raised in a house on West Eleventh Street in Greenwich Village, Fonseca studied at the Dalton School in Manhattan and St. Ann's School in Brooklyn Heights. Fonseca failed to graduate from high school and at age 18, he moved to Barcelona, where he studied with Augusto Torres. Fonseca lived in Barcelona until 1993, when he returned to New York a few months before his death.

Fonseca had what his sister called "a slightly perverse anti-taste for exquisite goods and 'luxuries' of all kinds." He preferred old objects, old clothes and junk that he collected from the streets of Barcelona. He chose to live in Barcelona's red-light district, among the city's poor, cripples, addicts, street girls, and bohemians.

=== Career ===
Late in his life, Fonseca painted four large paintings known as "The War Murals" depicting scenes of warfare. The individual works are titled Tank (oil on canvas, 208.2 x 269.2 cm) Fire (oil on canvas, 207 x 284.5 cm), Bucharest (oil on canvas, 208.2 x 279.4 cm), and Timișoara (oil on canvas, 210.8 x 271.7 cm). One writer described the anti-war theme in "The War Murals", begun in 1989 and finished in 1993, as "the most powerful statement of their kind since Picasso's great Guernica." The murals were inspired by images of boy soldiers torn from the newspaper and by images of violence in Eastern Europe, including the public execution of Nicolae Ceauşescu. His sister recalled watching scenes of the upheavals in Eastern Europe on CNN with Bruno and wrote: "The War Murals - Bruno's four larger narrative paintings inspired by the anti-communist upheavals - represent his greatest synthesis of abstract and representational painting, something he had struggled for throughout his working life." Fonseca worked on the murals for several years, finishing them while he was suffering from the effects of AIDS. A public showing of "The War Murals" was the opening exhibition for the John McEnroe Gallery in SoHo in January 1994. Fonseca also had a solo show at New York's Salander-O'Reilly in 1993.

After contracting AIDS, Fonseca returned to New York. He married his pupil, German painter Anke Blaue, shortly before his death. He died of AIDS in 1994 at age 36.
