= Isabel Fonseca =

American writer (born 1961)

- Born: 1961 (age 64–65); New York, U.S.
- Education: Barnard College; Wadham College
- Occupation: Writer
- Notable work: Bury Me Standing: The Gypsies and Their Journey (1995); Attachment (2009)
- Spouse: Martin Amis (m. 1996; died 2023)
- Children: 2
- Parent(s): Gonzalo Fonseca; Elizabeth Kaplan
- Relatives: Caio Fonseca (brother); Bruno Fonseca (brother); Quina Fonseca (sister)

Isabel Fonseca, Lady Amis (born 1961) is an American writer. She is best known for her books Bury Me Standing: The Gypsies and Their Journey and Attachment. She was married to novelist Sir Martin Amis until his death in May 2023.

== Early life ==
Isabel Fonseca was born in New York in 1961 and is the youngest of four children born to Uruguayan sculptor Gonzalo Fonseca and American painter Elizabeth Kaplan. Her siblings include Caio Fonseca, a painter whose works hang in the collections of the Metropolitan Museum of Art and Whitney Museum of Art; Bruno Fonseca, a painter who died from AIDS in 1994; and Quina Fonseca, a designer of clothes, costumes, and hats.

Her maternal grandfather was Jacob Merrill Kaplan,, a merchant, "molasses king", financier, former president of the Oldetyme Molasses Company, and former owner of Welch's grape juice. Jacob Merrill Kaplan through his J.M. Kaplan Fund, Inc. of 55 Fifth Avenue, New York City, at least a million dollars of Central Intelligence Agency funds were dispensed to such leftist organizations as the Institute of International Labor.Research, Inc., headed by Norman Thomas.

Fonseca grew up in a house on West 11th Street in New York that used to belong to Daniel Chester French, the sculptor of the Lincoln Memorial.

Fonseca attended Concord Academy and graduated magna cum laude from Barnard College in 1984. She then went on to study at Wadham College in Oxford. After her brother Bruno's death, she edited a large book of his paintings which included essays by Alan Jenkins, Karen Wilkin and a personal essay by her, Isabel Fonseca. Bruno Fonseca: The Secret Life of Painting was published by Abbeville Press and the Brooklyn Museum.

== Career ==
During her time at Wadham College, she began writing for The Times Literary Supplement, where she went on to become an assistant editor. She left the TLS to write Bury Me Standing: The Gypsies and Their Journey, a story of the Roma which she researched while traveling alone through Eastern Europe for four years. She traveled with Gypsies from Bulgaria, Poland, Czech Republic, Slovakia, the former Yugoslavia, Romania, and Albania. The title comes from a Gypsy proverb, "Bury me standing. I've been on my knees all my life." Bury Me Standing was originally published in 1995 by Alfred A Knopf and translated into 22 languages.

Fonseca has also written for The Times, The Guardian, The Economist, Harper’s Bazaar, The Wall Street Journal, The New Yorker, and The American Scholar, among other publications.

Between 2003 and 2006, she and her husband, Martin Amis, and two children, Fernanda and Clio, lived in Uruguay where she designed and built their house, in a small fishing village on a windy peninsula in the southern Atlantic. While in Uruguay, she wrote her first novel, Attachment published by Alfred A. Knopf and Chatto & Windus in 2009.

== Marriage to Martin Amis ==
Isabel Fonseca met novelist Martin Amis during a phone interview while she was working at The Times Literary Supplement. They began a relationship while Amis was still married to his first wife, Antonia Phillips, an American academic and the mother of his two sons. In 1993, Amis left Phillips for Fonseca, which led to much "finger-wagging" by the British press. The press painted Amis as a second-generation philanderer and Fonseca as a sultry American heiress (because of her being a descendant of Jacob Merrill Kaplan). They had two daughters. In 2011, the Amises left London for Brooklyn. In the summer of 2017, Daniel Craig and Rachel Weisz purchased Martin Amis and Isabel Fonseca's four-story detached house, in the Cobble Hill neighborhood, through a limited liability company. In May 2023, Martin Amis died at their house in Lake Worth, Florida.

== Notable works ==
- Bury Me Standing: The Gypsies and Their Journey (1995)
- Bruno Fonseca: The Secret Life of Painting (2000)
- Attachment (2009)
