= Gonzalo Fonseca =

Uruguayan sculptor (1922–1997)

Gonzalo Matias Fonseca
- Born: 2 July 1922; Montevideo, Uruguay
- Died: 11 June 1997 (aged 74); Seravezza, Italy
- Known for: Sculpture
- Movement: Universal Constructivism
- Spouse: Elizabeth Kaplan
- Children: Quina, Bruno, Caio, and Isabel

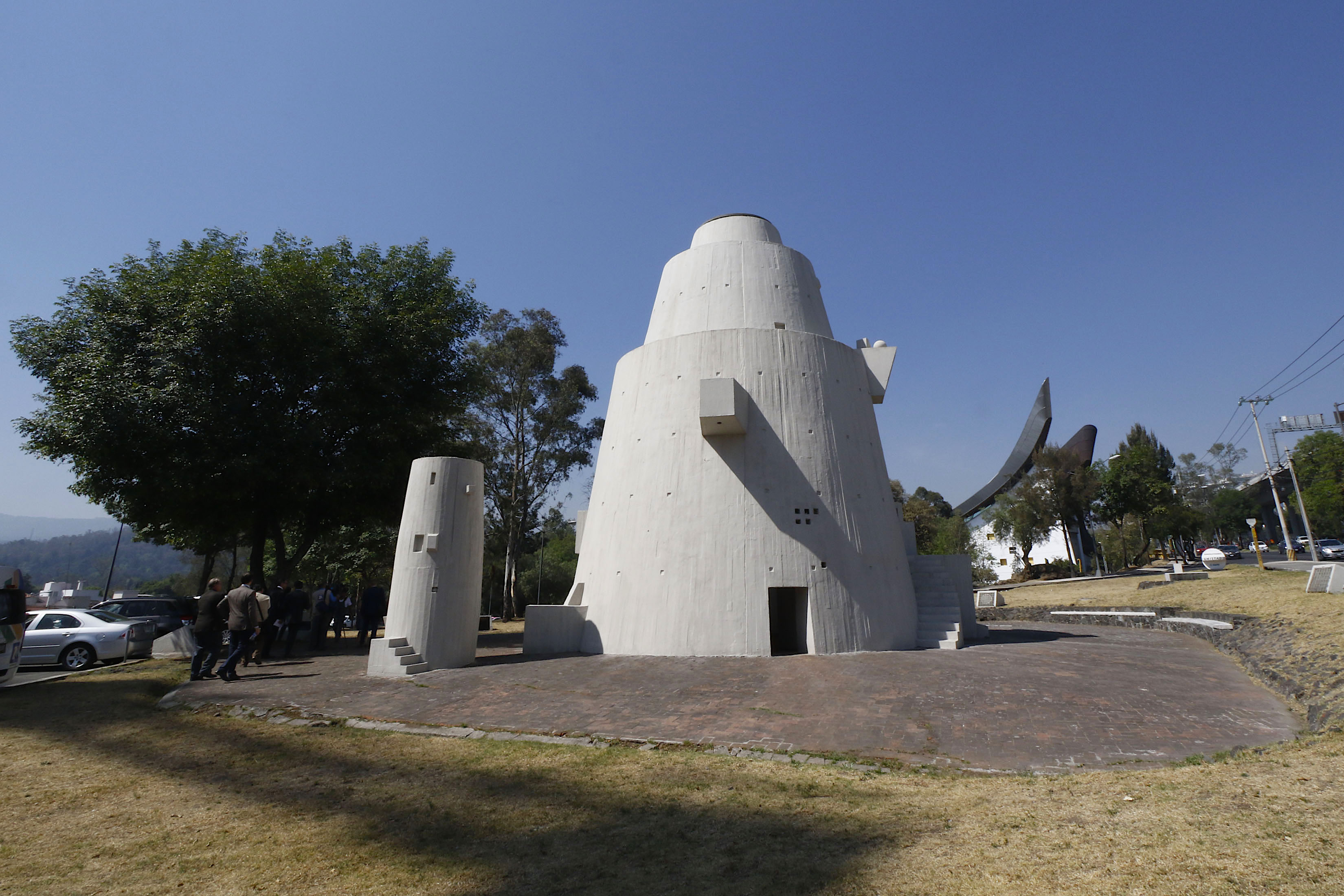
Tower created for the 1968 Summer Olympics held in Mexico City.

Gonzalo Fonseca (2 July 1922 – 11 June 1997) was a Uruguayan artist known for his stone sculpting. He originally studied to be an architect at the University of Montevideo, but discovered modern art in 1942 after working in the Taller Torres-Garcia workshop. He studied painting in the workshop until 1949, and became interested in pre-Columbian art during that time. Fonseca is frequently associated with the movement Universal Constructivism.

== Biography ==
Fonseca was born in Montevideo, Uruguay, in July 1922. He traveled to Europe in the 1930s, and was exposed to archaeology, anthropology, and history. Fonseca also taught himself to sculpt in stone and paint with watercolor. In 1939, he began studying architecture at the University of Montevideo. However, in 1942 Fonseca left the University to work with Joaquín Torres-García. While working at the Torres-Garcia workshop, he became more diverse in his techniques, trying sculpting, painting, ceramics, and drawing. During the course of the 1940s, Fonseca traveled through Peru and Bolivia, studying art with other members of the Torres-Garcia workshop.

In 1950 he left Uruguay, and traveled through several countries in Europe and the Middle East. Fonseca worked in excavations run by Flinders Petrie in Egypt, Sudan, Syria, and traveled through Lebanon, Jordan, Turkey, and Greece. These archeological digs would prove fundamental in his future artworks. While living in Europe, he worked in ceramics as well as painting.

He met and married Elizabeth Kaplan, from New York City, in the mid-1950s (and divorced two decades later) and moved to Manhattan in 1958 after being awarded a Simon Guggenheim Fellowship. He had four children, Quina, Bruno, Caio, and Isabel with Elizabeth Kaplan, two of whom (Bruno Fonseca and Caio Fonseca) became renowned artists. Their youngest child Isabel Fonseca became a writer.

In 1962 Fonseca had his first exhibition in the United States, at the Portland Art Museum in Oregon. This exhibition contained mostly flat compositions, as was common with the works done by the Torres-Garcia workshop at that time. Fonseca also created wooden reliefs for this exhibition, which laid a foundation for his three-dimensional art. He began working in New York and in Italy, near Carrara. It is in the 1970s that he focuses on painting towards sculpture and on three-dimensional architectural forms. He started working on large scale pieces mostly of marble, and recycled limestone from New York's demolished buildings. In 1983, he became a citizen of the United States. During the late 1970s and 1980s he became more focused on towers, such as Torre del recien nacido ("Tower of the Newborn Child") and Torre de los vientos. He had few solo shows throughout his career, but several group exhibitions in which he became known for his stone sculptures of modern influenced architectural forms. He died in Italy at the age of 74 in Seravezza, Italy, in his studio.

== Iconology ==
As a Universal Constructivist, Fonseca sought to focus on art outside of nationality. This is clear in the amount of traveling and excavating he did, not trying to define a national identity but rather a universal identity, free of false stereotypes.

Fonseca's influence on his art derived from a fascination with history and cultures, and his early training as an architect helped him realize and formulate his sculptures. His pieces offer a sense of mystery, and yet a deeper meaning.

Fonseca's sculptures take architectural reference as well as that of ancient ruins and what he studied while taking part in excavations. This causes the viewer to recognize and identify parts of the sculpture, perhaps relating them to the characteristics of a building or home. But the way in which he manifests these pieces still leaves something to be defined by the viewer in relation to time and space. His works do not automatically construct a definite time period in the viewer's mind, leaving it to the imagination as to what it may or may not represent in time and space.

Fonseca was very interested in the nature and history of the stones used in his sculpture. While working in the quarries, he would notice the changes in the stone due to climate. It is said that the fragile nature of many of these stones is why Fonseca had so few exhibitions: sand did not travel well.

Fonseca's sculpture has two clear features. The first is the intimacy that causes one to relate innately to his works. The other feature is the grandeur in his sculpture, strengthened by the simplicity of the geometric forms. His art is known as "a journey through the history of archeology." The archeological basis stems from Precolombian architecture as well as Eastern Mediterranean, and even New York City architecture. It was clear that archeology spread through all of Fonseca's work.

Fonseca's artworks also tend to be a labyrinth of thought. Some of the works contain inscriptions that may give a glimpse, but do not truly allow much insight into his mind. There are many stairways and ladders in his sculptures, which lead to tombs such as the quarries he worked in. Fonseca shared that these ladders also show the "descent into the infernos."

== Selected artworks ==
Torre de los vientos ("Tower of the Winds"), 1974. This sculpture was constructed as a tribute to the Greek architect Andronicus. Andronicus had built a tower in Athens to commemorate the gods of the winds. Fonseca's tribute had four sides, each side with Latin inscriptions indicating the four different kinds of winds in Greek mythology. The four winds are the North wind known as Boreas, which brought hail; the East morning wind known as Eurus; the South wind known as Noto, which brought sorrow; and the mild wind from the West known as Zephirus, which was feared by the sailors. The dome on top likely symbolizes the center of the world, with its inscription Onphalos.

El Pilar ("The Pilar"), 1986, 1990, 1997. This sculpture was precisely carved and was placed in three separate contexts: Seravezza, Italy, Pietrasanta, Italy, and the entrance of Uruguay's Pavilion at the XLIV Biennale Di Venezia. It contains a ladder, which is common in Fonseca's work, which is known to relate to both the Hebrew ladder of Jacob and also the ladders in the quarries he excavated in.

Columbarium Major, 1976. This sculpture is known for its contrast in change of scale. There are multiple cuts into the wood filled with geometric forms, as well as his well-known stairways. This artwork also contains "betilos", known as sacred stones.

La Casa ("The House"), 1963. This artwork was a relief painting with engravings of ladders and figures. It also included wood-carved objects hanging from the top corner of the painting.

Graneros III, 1971–1975. This work was part of horizontal, heavy slabs that were displayed as urban projects for participants to interact with. It was carved of red travertine marble. It mimics the form of an actual grain store, but also refers to a store of knowledge, with the grain representing the knowledge.

== XIX Olympiad ==
Fonseca designed and created a 12-meter high concrete tower as his contribution to the Route of Friendship (Spanish: La Ruta de la Amistad) of the 1968 Summer Olympics in Mexico City. It was titled Torre. This structure recalls the shape of the Malwiya, the spiral minaret of the Great Mosque of Samarra. It is hollow, and was later converted into a studio, then used as an artists' exhibition space from 1997 to 2004.

The XIX Olympiad was significant in that these were the first Olympic Games held in Latin America. The "Route of Friendship" contained nineteen concrete sculptures on the highway surrounding the capital. This was a collaboration of architect Pedro Ramirez Vasquez and German sculptor Mathias Goeritz. The goal was to give a universal quality to the Games with sculptures from around the world.

This structure is not to be confused with La Torre de los Vientos, or The Tower of the Winds, which was built in 1974 as a tribute.

== Selected exhibitions ==
=== Solo exhibitions ===
- 1952 – "Gonzalo Fonseca Paintings," Studio Claudio Matinenghi, Roma
- 1953 – "Gonzalo Fonseca Ceramica," Galleria San Marco, Roma
- 1962 – "Gonzalo Fonseca, Selected Artworks", The Portland Museum, Oregon
- 1970 – "Gonzalo Fonseca, Recent Works," The Jewish Museum, New York
- 1974 – "Gonzalo Fonseca," Galeria Conkright, Caracas
- 1976 – "Gonzalo Fonseca," Galeria Adler / Castillo, Caracas
- 1977 – "Sculture di Gonzalo Fonseca," Galleria del Naviglio, Milan
- 1978 – "Fonseca," Fiera di Bologna, Italy
- 1986 – "Gonzalo Fonseca: Sculpture," Arnold Herstand Gallery, New York
- 1988 – "Gonzalo Fonseca: Sculpture and Drawings," Arnold Herstand Gallery, New York
- 1989 – "Fonseca, Sculpture and Drawings", The Arts Club of Chicago, Illinois
- 1991 – "Gonzalo Fonseca, Sabbakhin, Sculpture", Arnold Herstand Gallery, New York
- 1994 – "Mundos de Gonzalo Fonseca," Museo de Bellas Artes, Caracas
- 1999 – "Gonzalo Fonseca," Fundacion Cesar Manrique, Lanzarote
- 2003 – "Gonzalo Fonseca," IVAM Institut Valencia d’Art Modern, Valencia

=== Group exhibitions ===
- 1946 – "Arte de America," Maison de l’Amerique, Paris
- 1950 – "Torres-Garcia & his Workshop," OAS Museum, Washington, D.C.
- 1954 – Bienal de Arte, São Paulo
- 1960 – "4 Constructivist works of the El Taller Torres-Garcia," The New School University, New York
- 1970 – "Universalismo Constructivo," Museo Nacional de Bellas Artes, Buenos Aires
- 1986 – "Torres-Garcia and his Legacy," Kouros Gallery, New York
- 1987 – "Latin American Artists in New York since 1970," A.M. Huntington Gallery, Austin, Texas
- 1988 – "The Latin American Spirit: Art and Artists in the U.S., 1920-1970," Center for the Arts, Vero Beach, Florida
- 1993 – "Latin American Artists of the 20th Century," Museum of Modern Art, New York
- 1995 – "65 Years of Constructivist Wood," Cecilia de Torres, Ltd., New York
- 1996 – "Constructive Universalism-School of the South," OAS Museum of the Americas, Washington, D.C.
- 1999 – "North and South Connected: An Abstraction of the Americas," Cecilia de Torres, New York
- 2000 – "Abstraction: The Amerindian Paradigm," Palais des Beaux-Arts Brussels, Belgica; IVAM Institut d’Art Modern, Valencia
