= Ethel Cain discography =

List of recordings by American singer and songwriter Ethel Cain

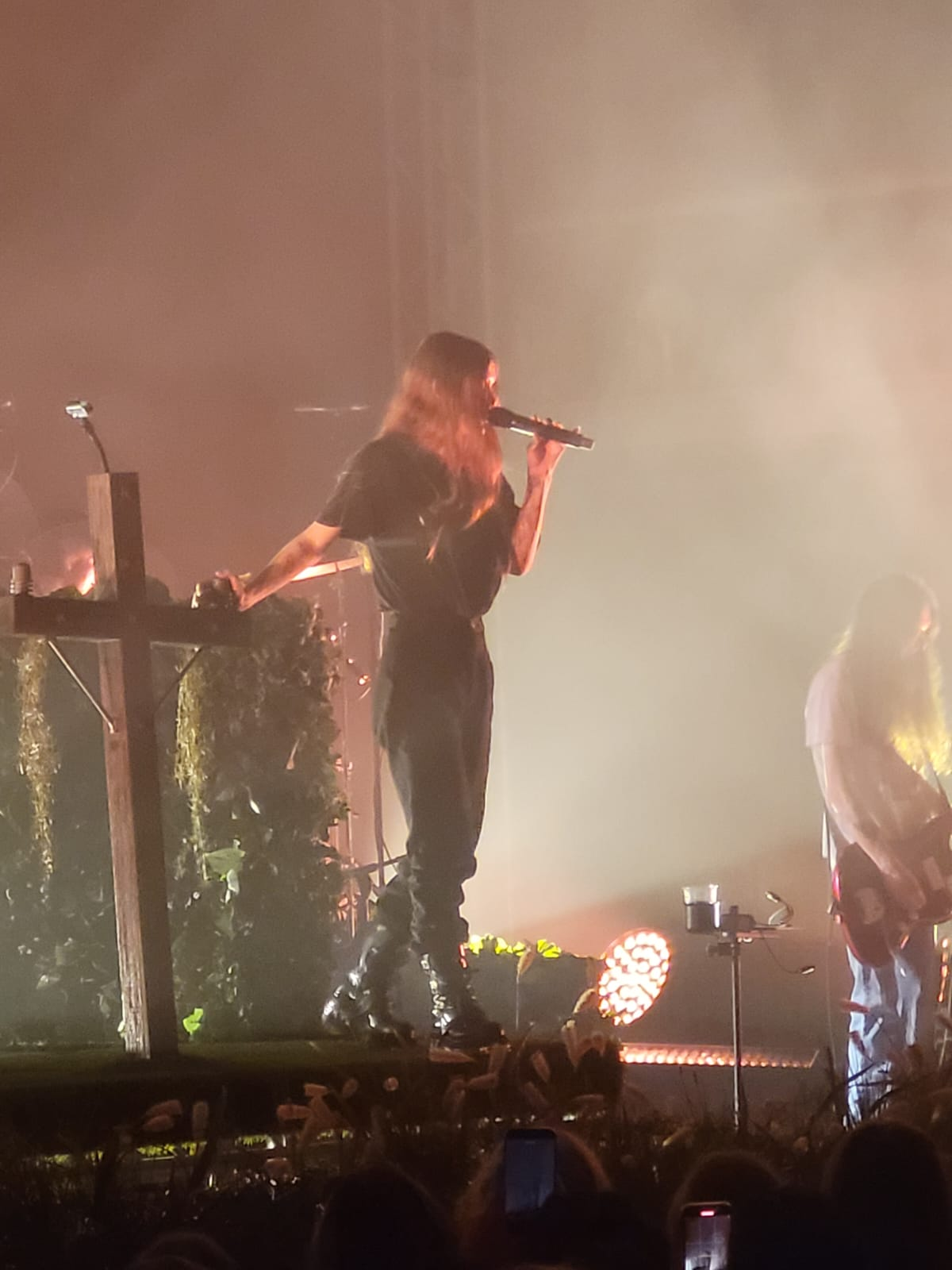
- Cain in 2025
- Studio albums: 2
- EPs: 3
- Singles: 10
- Music videos: 11
- Other studio recordings: 1
- Promotional singles: 2

American singer-songwriter Ethel Cain has released two studio albums, three extended plays, one studio recording, ten singles, two promotional singles and eleven music videos.

After recording a series of EPs, Cain released her critically well acclaimed debut studio album Preacher's Daughter, which garnered her a cult following. It entered the top ten of the US Billboard 200 chart. Her next project Perverts was released in early 2025 and her second studio album Willoughby Tucker, I'll Always Love You followed later that year, reaching the top 10 in Australia, New Zealand and Scotland.

== Studio albums ==
Title	Album details	Peak chart positions										Certifications
Title	Album details	US	AUS	AUT	BEL (FL)	CAN	GER	IRE	NLD	NZ	UK	Certifications
Preacher's Daughter	Released: May 12, 2022; Label: Daughters of Cain; Format: Digital download, LP, streaming	10	5	24	11	64	15	52	10	11	10	BPI: Silver
Willoughby Tucker, I'll Always Love You	Released: August 8, 2025; Label: Daughters of Cain; Format: Digital download, vinyl, streaming, CD, cassette	14	5	23	11	91	16	17	11	5	12	

== Extended plays ==
Title	EP details	Peak chart positions	
Title	EP details	AUS	NLD
Carpet Bed	Released: September 13, 2019; Label: Daughters of Cain; Format: Digital download, streaming	—	—
Golden Age	Released: December 1, 2019; Label: Self-released; Format: Digital download, CD, cassette, streaming	—	—
Inbred	Released: April 23, 2021; Label: Daughters of Cain (via AWAL); Format: Digital download, CD, cassette, streaming	22	62

== Other studio recordings ==
Title	Studio recording details	Peak chart positions
Title	Studio recording details	UK DL
Perverts	Released: January 8, 2025; Label: Daughters of Cain (via AWAL); Format: Digital download, streaming	24

== Singles ==
=== As lead artist ===
Title	Year	Peak chart positions		Certifications	Album
Title	Year	US Rock	NZ Hot	Certifications	Album
"Michelle Pfeiffer" (featuring Lil Aaron)	2021	—	—		Inbred
"Crush"	2021	—	—		Inbred
"Gibson Girl"	2022	—	—		Preacher's Daughter
"Strangers"	2022	—	—		Preacher's Daughter
"American Teenager"	2022	—	—	RIAA: Gold	Preacher's Daughter
"Famous Last Words (An Ode to Eaters)"	2023	—	—		1017 ALYX 9SM Compilation Vol. 1
"For Sure"	2024	—	—		American Football (Covers)
"Punish"	2024	—	29		Perverts
"Nettles"	2025	—	17		Willoughby Tucker, I'll Always Love You
"Fuck Me Eyes"	2025	35	10		Willoughby Tucker, I'll Always Love You
"—" denotes a recording that did not chart or was not released in that territory.

=== Promotional singles ===
Title	Year	Album
"Everytime" (Spotify Singles)	2022	Non-album promotional singles
"Morning Elvis" (Live at Denver Ball Arena) (with Florence and the Machine)	2022	Non-album promotional singles

== Other charted songs ==
Title	Year	Peak chart positions	Album
Title	Year	NZ Hot	Album
"Janie"	2025	25	Willoughby Tucker, I'll Always Love You
"Willoughby's Theme"	2025	38	Willoughby Tucker, I'll Always Love You
"Dust Bowl"	2025	10	Willoughby Tucker, I'll Always Love You
"Waco, Texas"	2025	36	Willoughby Tucker, I'll Always Love You

== Music videos ==
Title	Year	Director	Ref
"The God"	2020	Hayden Anhedönia	
"Fear No Plague"	2021	Hayden Anhedönia and Salem Anhedönia	
"God's Country"	2021	Hayden Anhedönia	
"Crush"	2021	Hayden Anhedönia	
"Crush" (stripped)	2021	Hayden Anhedönia	
"Housofpsychoticwomn"	2021	Hayden Anhedönia	
"American Teenager"	2022	Hayden Anhedönia	
"Famous Last Words (An Ode to Eaters)"	2023	Hayden Anhedönia and Silken Weinberg	
"For Sure"	2024	Hayden Anhedönia	
"Punish"	2024	Hayden Anhedönia and Silken Weinberg	
"Vacillator"	2025	Hayden Anhedönia and Silken Weinberg	
