= List of songs recorded by Ethel Cain =

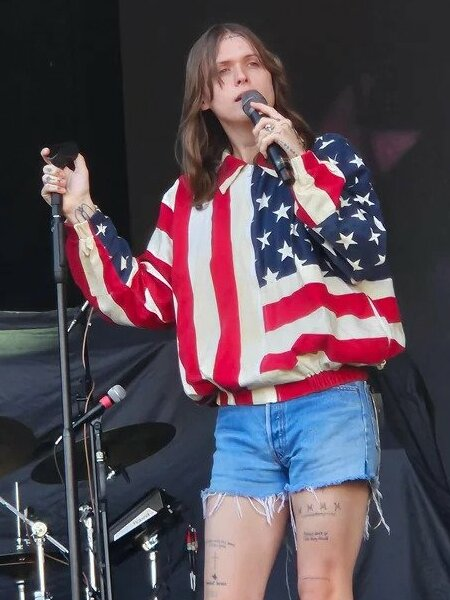
Cain performing at the Gunnersbury Park in 2023.

The American singer-songwriter and record producer Hayden Silas Anhedönia has recorded songs for one studio album, three extended plays (EPs), and one other studio recording as Ethel Cain, as well as other projects with different monikers. She became interested in music from a young age, studying classical piano at age eight, and being involved in a church choir. After publishing demos of songs on SoundCloud, the singer officially started releasing music with the names Atlas and White Silas, with which she released several extended plays between 2017 and 2019. In that year, she released Carpet Bed and Golden Age, her first two EPs as Ethel Cain, through her own Daughters of Cain record label. After signing with Prescription Songs in 2020, she released Inbred, with which she gained prominence and popularity, especially with the single "Crush".

In 2022, she released her critically acclaimed debut studio album Preacher's Daughter, a concept album which she wrote and produced in its entirety, with instrumental assistance from collaborators Matthew Tomasi and Steven Mark Colyer. She has written all of her original songs, and has collaborated with other artists, including Lil Aaron and Florence and the Machine. In 2023, she wrote and recorded the song "Famous Last Words (An Ode to Eaters)", for the first compilation album from the American project 1017 ALYX 9SM. Cain's drone studio recording Perverts was released in 2025, preceded by the single "Punish".

== Songs ==
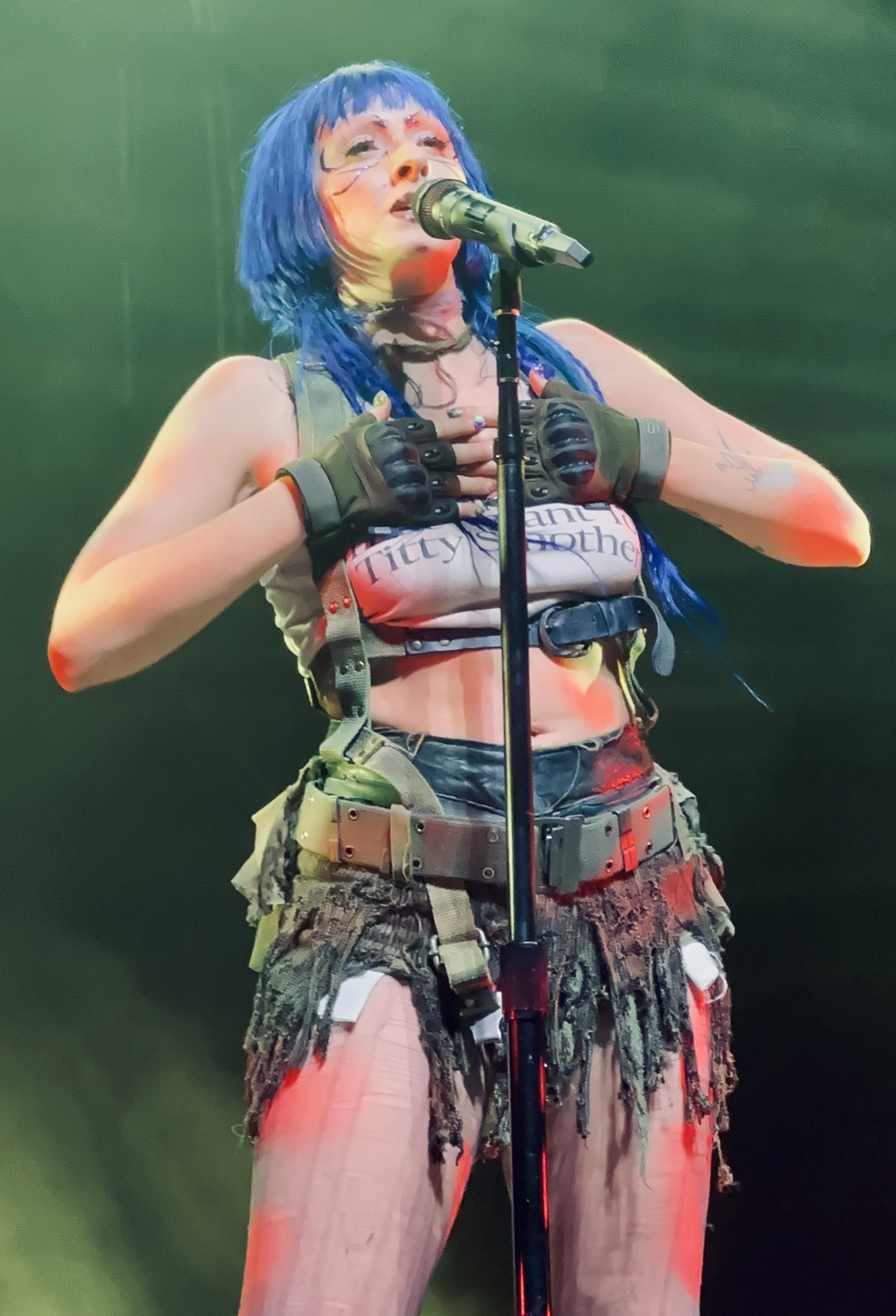
Cain was featured in Ashnikko's song "Dying Star".

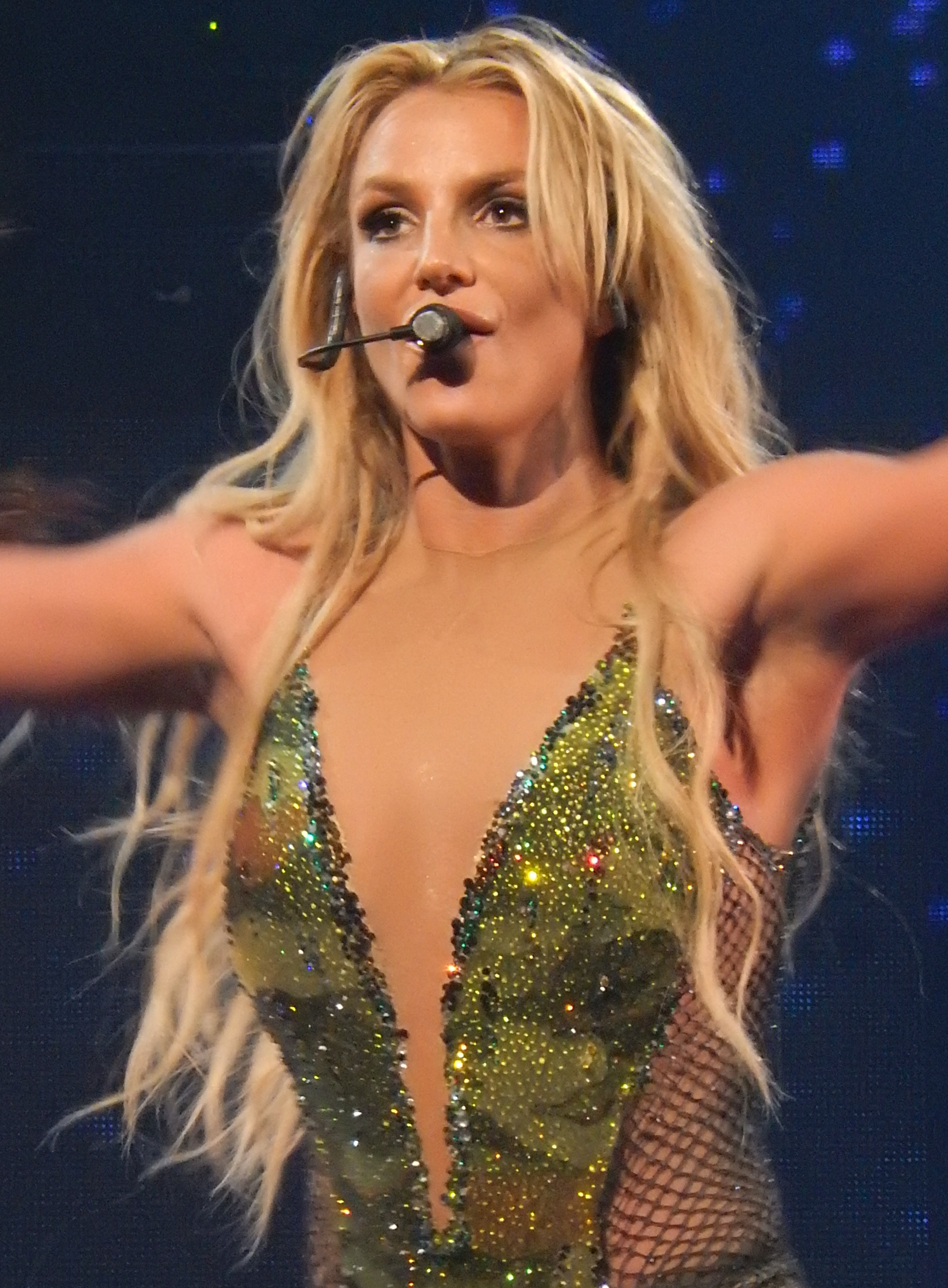
Cain has covered "Everytime", co-written by Britney Spears.

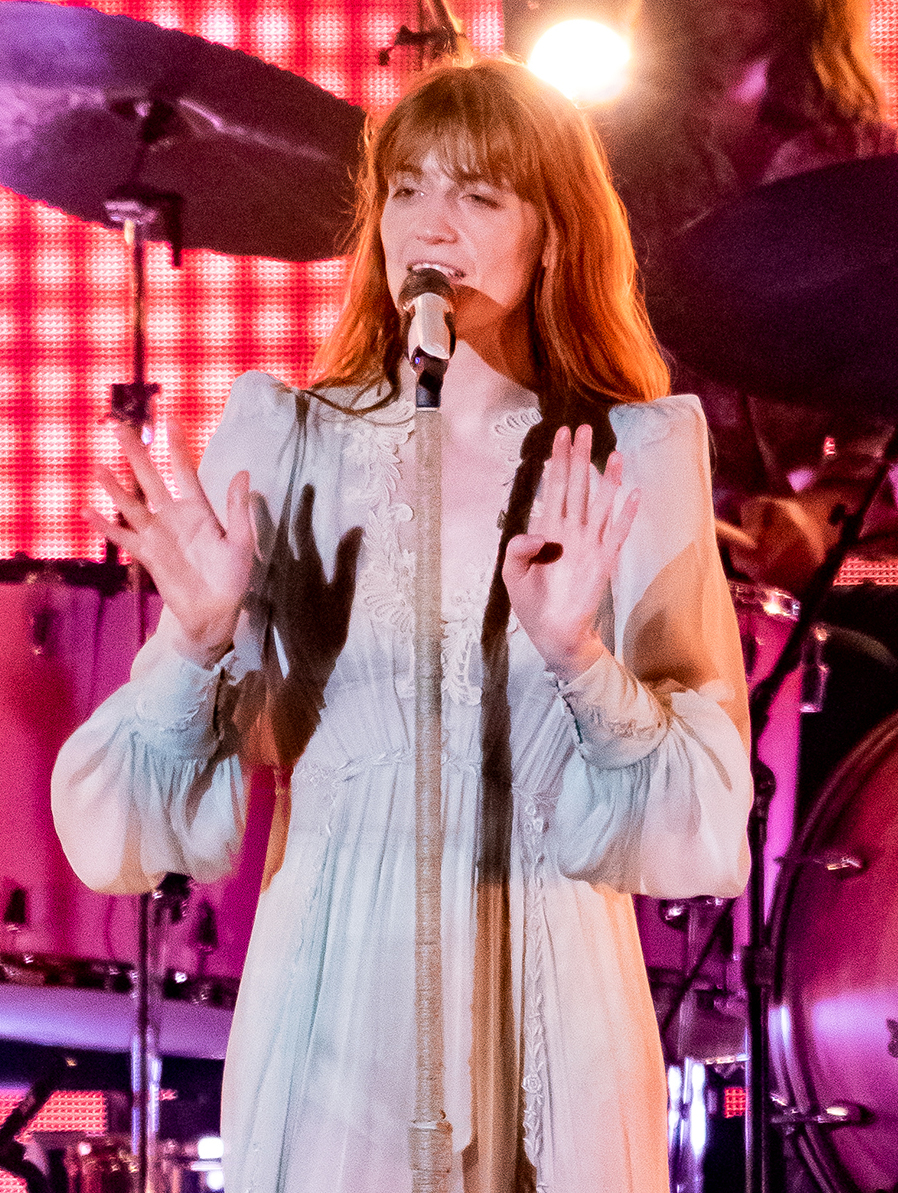
Florence and the Machine and Cain collaborated on the live version of "Morning Elvis".

Name of song, performers, writer(s), original release, and year of release
Song	Artist(s)	Writer(s)	Original release	Year	Ref.
"Age of Delilah"	Ethel Cain	Hayden Silas Anhedönia	Inbred (Deluxe)	2021	
"Aging Young Women"	Anna von Hausswolff featuring Ethel Cain		Iconoclasts	2025	
"A House In Nebraska"	Ethel Cain	Hayden Silas Anhedönia	Preacher's Daughter	2022	
"A Knock At The Door"	Ethel Cain	Hayden Silas Anhedönia	Willoughby Tucker, I'll Always Love You	2025	
"Amber Waves"	Ethel Cain	Hayden Silas Anhedönia	Perverts	2025	
"American Teenager"	Ethel Cain	Hayden Silas Anhedönia; Steven Mark Colyer	Preacher's Daughter	2022	
"Antlers"	Ethel Cain	Hayden Silas Anhedönia	Carpet Bed EP	2019	
"August Underground"	Ethel Cain	Hayden Silas Anhedönia; Matthew Tomasi	Preacher's Daughter	2022	
"Casings"	Ethel Cain	Hayden Silas Anhedönia	Golden Age	2019	
"Child of Cain"	Ethel Cain	Hayden Silas Anhedönia	Golden Age (Deluxe)	2019	
"Crush"	Ethel Cain	Hayden Silas Anhedönia	Inbred	2021	
"Crying During Sex"	Ethel Cain	Hayden Silas Anhedönia	Inbred (Deluxe)	2021	
"Dog Days"	Ethel Cain	Hayden Silas Anhedönia	Carpet Bed EP	2019	
"Dust Bowl"	Ethel Cain	Hayden Silas Anhedönia	Willoughby Tucker, I'll Always Love You	2025	
"Dying Star"	Ashnikko featuring Ethel Cain	Ashton Nicole Casey; Hayden Silas Anhedönia; Ilsey Juber; Slinger	Weedkiller	2023	
"Earnhardt"	Ethel Cain	Hayden Silas Anhedönia	Inbred (Deluxe)	2021	
"Etienne"	Ethel Cain	Hayden Silas Anhedönia	Perverts	2025	
"Everytime" (Spotify Singles)	Ethel Cain	Britney Spears; Annet Artani	Non-album single	2022	
"Family Tree"	Ethel Cain	Hayden Silas Anhedönia	Preacher's Daughter	2022	
"Family Tree (Intro)"	Ethel Cain	Hayden Silas Anhedönia	Preacher's Daughter	2022	
"Famous Last Words (An Ode to Eaters)"	1017 ALYX 9SM and Ethel Cain	Hayden Silas Anhedönia	Compilation Vol. 1	2023	
"For Sure" (cover)	Ethel Cain	Mike Kinsella; Steve Holmes; Steve Lamos	American Football (Covers)	2024	
"Fuck Me Eyes"	Ethel Cain	Hayden Silas Anhedönia	Willoughby Tucker, I'll Always Love You	2025	
"Gibson Girl"	Ethel Cain	Hayden Silas Anhedönia	Preacher's Daughter	2022	
"God's Country"	Ethel Cain featuring Wicca Phase Springs Eternal	Hayden Silas Anhedönia; Adam McIlwee	Inbred	2021	
"Golden Age"	Ethel Cain	Hayden Silas Anhedönia	Golden Age	2019	
"Growing Pains"	Ethel Cain	Hayden Silas Anhedönia	Carpet Bed EP	2019	
"Hard Times"	Ethel Cain	Hayden Silas Anhedönia	Preacher's Daughter	2022	
"Head in the Wall"	Ethel Cain	Hayden Silas Anhedönia	Golden Age	2019	
"Housofpsychoticwomn"	Ethel Cain	Hayden Silas Anhedönia	Perverts	2025	
"Inbred"	Ethel Cain	Hayden Silas Anhedönia	Inbred	2021	
"Janie"	Ethel Cain	Hayden Silas Anhedönia	Willoughby Tucker, I'll Always Love You	2025	
"Knuckle Velvet"	Ethel Cain and Yah Wav	Hayden Silas Anhedönia	Golden Age	2019	
"Lilies"	Ethel Cain and Mercy Necromancy	Hayden Silas Anhedönia; Tara Oaks	Golden Age	2019	
"Michelle Pfeiffer"	Ethel Cain featuring Lil Aaron	Hayden Silas Anhedönia; Kora Puckett; Lil Aaron	Inbred	2021	
"Misuse Oh"	Ethel Cain	Hayden Silas Anhedönia	Carpet Bed EP	2019	
"Morning Elvis" (Live at Denver Ball Arena)	Florence and the Machine and Ethel Cain	Florence Welch; Dave Bayley	Non-album single	2022	
"Nettles"	Ethel Cain	Hayden Silas Anhedönia	Willoughby Tucker, I'll Always Love You	2025	
"Onanist"	Ethel Cain	Hayden Silas Anhedönia	Perverts	2025	
"Perverts"	Ethel Cain	Hayden Silas Anhedönia	Perverts	2025	
"Ptolemaea"	Ethel Cain	Hayden Silas Anhedönia; Matthew Tomasi	Preacher's Daughter	2022	
"Pulldrone"	Ethel Cain	Hayden Silas Anhedönia	Perverts	2025	
"Punish"	Ethel Cain	Hayden Silas Anhedönia	Perverts	2024	
"Radio Towers"	Ethel Cain	Hayden Silas Anhedönia	Willoughby Tucker, I'll Always Love You	2025	
"Selby Wall"	Ethel Cain	Hayden Silas Anhedönia	Golden Age (Deluxe)	2019	
"Sun Bleached Flies"	Ethel Cain	Hayden Silas Anhedönia	Preacher's Daughter	2022	
"Strangers"	Ethel Cain	Hayden Silas Anhedönia	Preacher's Daughter	2022	
"Sunday Morning"	Ethel Cain	Hayden Silas Anhedönia	Golden Age	2019	
"Tempest"	Ethel Cain	Hayden Silas Anhedönia	Willoughby Tucker, I'll Always Love You	2025	
"Televangelism"	Ethel Cain	Hayden Silas Anhedönia	Preacher's Daughter	2022	
"Thatorchia"	Ethel Cain	Hayden Silas Anhedönia	Perverts	2025	
"Thoroughfare"	Ethel Cain	Hayden Silas Anhedönia	Preacher's Daughter	2022	
"Two-Headed Mother"	Ethel Cain	Hayden Silas Anhedönia	Inbred	2021	
"Unpunishable"	Ethel Cain	Hayden Silas Anhedönia	Inbred	2021	
"Vacillator"	Ethel Cain	Hayden Silas Anhedönia	Perverts	2025	
"Waco, Texas"	Ethel Cain	Hayden Silas Anhedönia	Willoughby Tucker, I'll Always Love You	2025	
"Western Nights"	Ethel Cain	Hayden Silas Anhedönia	Preacher's Daughter	2022	
"Willoughby's Interlude"	Ethel Cain	Hayden Silas Anhedönia	Willoughby Tucker, I'll Always Love You	2025	
"Willoughby's Theme"	Ethel Cain	Hayden Silas Anhedönia	Willoughby Tucker, I'll Always Love You	2025	
