= List of Ethel Cain live performances =

Ethel Cain live performances
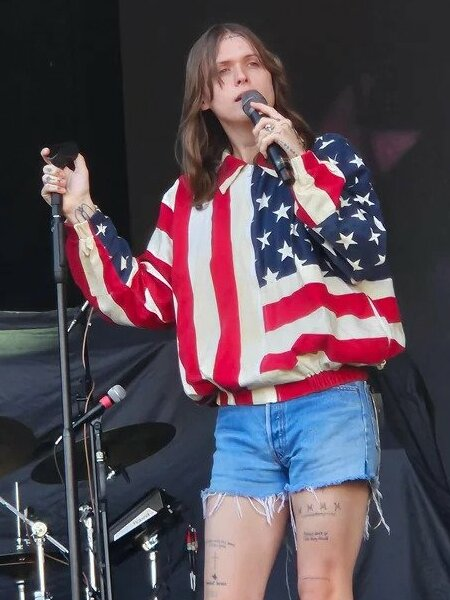
- Cain performing at Gunnersbury Park in 2023
- Headlining tours: 3
- Supporting tours: 2
- Music festivals: 28
- One-off concerts: 4
- Radio broadcasts: 2

Since her debut with her main project in mid-2019, American singer-songwriter Ethel Cain has embarked on three headlining concert tours. She also performed at 28 music festivals, four one-off concerts, and two radio broadcasts, reaching 14 countries across four different continents.

Her first headlining concert tour was The Freezer Bride Tour, which started on July 14, 2022, and ended on December 6. Her second tour, the Blood Stained Blonde Tour, took place in 2023. Both were in support of her debut studio album Preacher's Daughter (2022). In these years, she also has performed as a support act at the Florence and the Machine's Dance Fever Tour, Caroline Polachek's Spiraling Tour, and Boygenius' The Tour. Cain's third headlining concert tour, the Childish Behaviour Tour, took place in 2024.

== Tours ==
=== Headlining ===
Title	First date	Last date	Associated album	Continent(s)	Opening acts
The Freezer Bride Tour	July 14, 2022	December 6, 2022	Preacher's Daughter	Europe; North America	Colyer
Blood Stained Blonde Tour	April 1, 2023	October 24, 2023	Preacher's Daughter	Europe; North America; Oceania	9Million; Katie Day; King Woman; Midwife; Searows; Skullcrusher; Taahliah; Wulven
The Childish Behaviour Tour	May 31, 2024	August 18, 2024	—	Europe; North America	—
The Willoughby Tucker Forever Tour	August 12, 2025	November 9, 2025	Willoughby Tucker, I'll Always Love You	Europe; North America	9million

=== As support act ===
Title	Headlining artist	First opening date	Last opening date	Continent(s)
Dance Fever Tour	Florence and the Machine	October 1, 2022		North America
Spiraling Tour	Caroline Polachek	May 16, 2023	May 20, 2023	North America
The Tour	Boygenius	August 20, 2023	August 23, 2023	Europe
The Land Is Inhospitable And So Are We Tour	Mitski	September 12, 2024	September 18, 2024	North America

== Music festivals ==
Date	Event	City	Country	Ref.
October 5, 2019	Snipfest 2	Tallahassee, Florida	United States	
July 15, 2022	Pitchfork Music Festival	Chicago	United States	
July 16, 2022	Pitchfork Music Festival	Chicago	United States	
August 5, 2022	Vortex Festival	Denver	United States	
August 27, 2022	This Ain't No Picnic Festival	Pasadena, California	United States	
August 28, 2022	Here and There Festival	San Diego	United States	
September 1, 2022	Here and There Festival	Austin, Texas	United States	
April 1, 2023	Festival Ceremonia	Mexico City	Mexico	
April 15, 2023	Coachella	Indio, California	United States	
April 22, 2023	Coachella	Indio, California	United States	
May 14, 2023	Kilby Block Party	Salt Lake City	United States	
June 2, 2023	Vivid Sydney	Sydney	Australia	
June 3, 2023	Vivid Sydney	Sydney	Australia	
June 4, 2023	Vivid Sydney	Sydney	Australia	
June 9, 2023	Rising Melbourne Festival	Melbourne	Australia	
June 10, 2023	Rising Melbourne Festival	Melbourne	Australia	
June 11, 2023	Dark Mofo	Hobart	Australia	
June 29, 2023	Roskilde Festival	Roskilde	Denmark	
July 2, 2023	Down The Rabbit Hole	Ewijk	Netherlands	
August 5, 2023	Bleached Festival	San Diego	United States	
August 6, 2023	Bleached Festival	San Diego	United States	
August 11, 2023	Outside Lands Music and Arts Festival	San Francisco	United States	
August 13, 2023	Day in Day Out Festival	Seattle	United States	
August 18, 2023	Pukkelpop	Kiewit	Belgium	
August 25, 2023	Leeds Festival	Leeds	England	
August 26, 2023	Rock en Seine	Saint-Cloud	France	
August 27, 2023	Reading Festival	Reading, Berkshire	England	
September 1, 2023	Meo Kalorama Festival	Lisbon	Portugal	
September 2, 2023	Cala Mijas Festival	Málaga	Spain	
September 3, 2023	Electric Picnic	Stradbally	Ireland	
September 29, 2023	Treeline Music Fest	Columbia, Missouri	United States	
October 1, 2023	All Things Go Music Festival	Columbia, Maryland	United States	
October 13, 2023	Austin City Limits Music Festival	Austin, Texas	United States	
October 14, 2023	Austin City Limits Music Festival	Austin, Texas	United States	
October 15, 2023	Austin City Limits Music Festival	Austin, Texas	United States	
May 31, 2024	Primavera Sound	Barcelona	Spain	
June 8, 2024	Primavera Sound	Porto	Portugal	
June 15, 2024	Bonnaroo Music Festival	Manchester, Tennessee	United States	
August 4, 2024	Hinterland Music Festival	St. Charles, Iowa	United States	
August 10, 2024	Thing Festival	Carnation, Washington	United States	
August 18, 2024	All Points East	Victoria Park, London	United Kingdom	
September 29, 2024	All Things Go Music Festival	New York City	United States	

== Other performances ==
Date	Event	City	Country	Opening act	Ref.
October 17, 2021	Opening for King Woman at Saint Vitus Bar	New York City	United States	—	
October 20, 2021	Special concert at El Sid	Los Angeles	United States	—	
May 18, 2022	Preacher's Daughter release show	Los Angeles	United States	Colyer	
May 25, 2022	Preacher's Daughter release show	New York City	United States	Colyer	
August 19, 2022	Live on KEXP	Seattle	United States	—	
October 6, 2022	WNXP's Sonic Cathedral	Nashville, Tennessee	United States	—	
