= The Childish Behaviour Tour =

2024 concert tour by Ethel Cain

- Tour by Ethel Cain
- Promotional poster for the European leg
- Location: Europe; North America
- Start date: May 31, 2024
- End date: August 18, 2024
- No. of shows: 15
- Website: daughtersofcain.com/tour

Ethel Cain concert chronology
- Blood Stained Blonde Tour (2023); The Childish Behaviour Tour (2024); The Willoughby Tucker Forever Tour (2025)

The Childish Behaviour Tour was the third concert tour by American singer-songwriter and producer Hayden Silas Anhedönia, under the stage name of Ethel Cain. It consisted of fifteen shows through North America and Europe, beginning on May 31, 2024 in Barcelona as part of the Primavera Sound Festival, and concluding on August 18 in London.

== Background ==
After releasing her critically acclaimed concept album Preacher's Daughter (2022), Ethel Cain embarked on her first two concert tours through North America, Europe and Oceania: The Freezer Bride Tour and the Blood Stained Blonde Tour, in 2022 and 2023 respectively. The latter marked the singer's Coachella Festival debut. To promote the album, she was also a supporting act in Florence and the Machine's Dance Fever Tour, and Caroline Polachek's Spiraling Tour.

The Childish Behaviour Tour was announced by Cain on social media on December 5, 2023, with six dates along with two performances at the Primavera Sound Festival in Madrid and Porto. General ticket sale began on December 8. Uproxx and NME named it as one of the most anticipated concert tours of 2024.

== Set list ==
This is the set list for June 3, 2024, and it is not intended to represent all dates throughout the tour.

1. "Dust Bowl"
2. "A House in Nebraska"
3. "Family Tree"
4. "Crush"
5. "Amber Waves"
6. "Thoroughfare"
7. "Punish"
8. "Gibson Girl"
9. "Televangelism"
10. "Sun Bleached Flies"
11. "Bette Davis Eyes"
12. "American Teenager"

== Shows ==
List of concerts, showing date, city, country, and venue
Date (2024)	City	Country	Venue
May 31 (Note: The show on May 31 was part of the Primavera Sound Festival.)	Barcelona	Spain	Primavera Sound
June 3	Paris	France	Le Trianon
June 4	Amsterdam	Netherlands	Paradiso
June 5	London	England	Roundhouse
June 7	Dublin	Ireland	3Olympia Theatre
June 10	London	England	Roundhouse
June 15 (Note: The show was part of Bonnaroo Music & Arts Festival.)	Manchester	United States	Bonnaroo Music & Arts Festival
June 22	Los Angeles	United States	The Greek Theater
June 27	New York	United States	SummerStage in Central Park
August 3 (Note: The show was part of Lollapalooza Chicago.)	Chicago	United States	Lollapalooza
August 4 (Note: The show was part of Hinterland Music Festival.)	Saint Charles	United States	Hinterland Music Festival
August 10 (Note: The show was part of Thing Festival.)	Carnation	United States	Thing Festival
August 13	Portland	United States	Pioneer Courthouse Square
August 16	Stradbally	Ireland	Stradbally Hall
August 18	London	England	Victoria Park

=== Cancelled date ===
List of cancelled concerts, showing date, city, country, venue, and reason for cancellation
Date (2024)	City	Country	Venue	Reason
June 8 (Note: The show on June 8 would have been part of the Primavera Sound Festival.)	Porto	Portugal	Parque da Cidade	Health problems
