= Perverts (album) =

2025 recording by Ethel Cain

Recording by Ethel Cain
- Released: January 8, 2025
- Recorded: 2024
- Genres: Drone; slowcore; dark ambient
- Length: 89:20
- Label: Daughters of Cain (via AWAL)
- Producer: Ethel Cain

Ethel Cain chronology
Preacher's Daughter (2022)	Perverts (2025)	Willoughby Tucker, I'll Always Love You (2025)

Singles from Perverts
- 1. "Punish" Released: November 1, 2024

Perverts is a studio recording (Note: Press releases describe Perverts as a "project", "body of work", or extended play (EP) rather than a studio album. While streaming services and some reliable sources call it an album or LP record, a preponderance of publications give it a neutral classification. This article uses "studio recording" and "project" for consistency.) by the American singer-songwriter and record producer Ethel Cain. It was self-released on January 8, 2025, through her record label Daughters of Cain with distribution from AWAL. She solely wrote, recorded, and produced it in 2024. Perverts is a drone, slowcore, and dark ambient project that Cain conceived as a standalone release to her main trilogy of albums, which began with Preacher's Daughter (2022). The lyrical themes of the project explore ways of perversion.

Perverts was preceded by the single "Punish" on November 1, 2024. The recording was well received by music critics, many of whom called it difficult to listen to and interpreted it as a shift from the sound of Preacher's Daughter. Commercially, it reached number 24 on the UK Album Downloads Chart.

== Background and development ==
In 2022, Ethel Cain released her debut studio album, Preacher's Daughter, to critical acclaim. The first release of a planned trilogy of albums, it centered on an eponymous fictional character, with Southern Gothic imagery and themes including religious indoctrination, sexual violence, isolation, and family trauma. Following its release, the album was included in several year-end lists of the best music and she garnered a cult following online. In an interview with The Guardian's Shaad D'Souza, Cain said that she did not want to achieve success, criticizing how she was often seen as a joke and "a dancing monkey in a circus". Speaking with Kiernan Shipka for Interview in June 2023, Cain expressed her excitement to "push it farther into the direction that [she has] always wanted to go" on her next full-length release, which is "10- to 20-minute songs just drenched in reverb, so slow, and super repetitive." She then expressed her admiration for slowcore and ambient music, and stated that she "feel[s] a bit more confident doing that and less worried about what people will think".

Cain conceived her following release, Perverts, as a standalone work unrelated to the planned trilogy of albums. It was initially developed as a concept project studying deviants, but only two of the first written songs—"Punish" and "Amber Waves"—were included in the final track listing. According to Stereogum's Brad Sanders, on the original version of Perverts, Cain "would have explored a different character that society considers a pervert on each song". She was influenced by a collection of short stories entitled Knockemstiff by Donald Ray Pollock. Prior to its release, Cain teased the themes of Perverts by publishing a short story titled "The Consequence of Audience". Sanders compared "The Consequence of Audience" with Cain's statement about an "irony epidemic", in which she criticized fans' memes inspired by songs from her debut album. Cain entirely wrote, recorded, and produced Perverts in Coraopolis, Pennsylvania, and Tallahassee, Florida, in 2024. She played several instruments, with collaboration from Matthew Tomasi, Angel Diaz, Bryan De Leon, and Madeline Johnston. Cain also mixed it, while Dale Becker was in charge of its mastering.

== Composition ==
=== Overview ===
Music critics have categorized Perverts as a drone, slowcore, and dark ambient recording. They also perceived elements of power electronics, folk, 1980s post-industrial, and noise music. The project has lo-fi, slow, and experimental production; Dork's Sam Taylor viewed it as Cain's "most experimental work" to that point. Several reviewers perceived it as a dark project; Lisa Wright of The Guardian believed that it would fit on the soundtrack to the 2024 film Nosferatu. Exclaim!'s Ian Gormely compared it to a late 2000s Mount Eerie album, while Sanders viewed similarities to the slowcore sound of the bands Codeine and Duster. Anthony Scanga of the Iowa Public Radio compared Perverts with the ambient works of the musician Aphex Twin and the slowcore music of the band Low.

Perverts contains guitars and more spoken-word vocals as it progresses. They are distorted and altered with numerous effects, including reverberations. The lyrical content of the project centers on ways of perversions. Various lyrics are repeated on each song. Adam England from Xtra Magazine perceived similarities with the group Throbbing Gristle and the composer La Monte Young. With a length of almost 90 minutes, Perverts includes nine tracks; four exceed the duration of 10 minutes.

=== Songs ===
The opening track, "Perverts", begins with a distorted, lo-fi recording from the 19th-century Christian hymn "Nearer, My God, to Thee". It is an experimental ambient track with a duration of 12 minutes. There are two statements throughout the song, "Heaven has forsaken the masturbator" and "it's happening to everybody". "Punish" is a slowcore song that starts with a lo-fi piano and builds to a crescendo. On her Tumblr account, Cain explained that it is about a pedophile and child sexual abuser who was shot by his victim's father and "harms himself repeatedly to simulate the bullet wound" on his body. However, she stated that it could be freely interpreted. More focused on the lyrics than the rest of the project, it includes a reference to Gary Plauché, an American man who killed his son's rapist, Jeffrey Doucet. Sanders drew similarities between the piano progressions of "Punish" and "Horizon", an Aldous Harding song from the album Party (2017). The minimalist drone-leaning "Housofpsychoticwomn" is named after the Kier-La Janisse book titled House of Psychotic Women: An Autobiographical Topography of Female Neurosis in Horror and Exploitation Films. Clare Martin of Paste drew comparisons to the horror film The Grudge (2004), while Steven Hyden of Uproxx compared it to the slower tracks on the 1977 album Low by the musician David Bowie, and the 2005 album Feels by the band Animal Collective. It contains repeated statements of "I love you" and "I do" over a static sound, told by a low-pitched voice to a lost love. On the over 7-minute-long "Vacillator", Cain sings melancholic lyrics portraying an abuser in a relationship: "I like that sound you make / when you're clawing at the edge / and without escape". A slowcore and country ballad with a minimalist production, it is the only song on Perverts that contains drums. Slant Magazine's Eric Mason believed that Cain "channels" the singer-songwriter Nicole Dollanganger on the track.

The title of the fifth song from Perverts, "Onanist", refers to masturbation. Over lo-fi piano and electric bass, Cain explores imagery inspired by Inferno, a poem by the writer Dante Alighieri. The longest track on the album, "Pulldrone", is monotone spoken word and drone played on a hurdy-gurdy with references to "I Have No Mouth, and I Must Scream". Martin compared its sound to Preacher's Daughter's "Ptolemaea" and to the works of the progressive folk group Lankum. In the lyrics, Cain references the writer Harlan Ellison and explores her own philosophical concept titled "The 12 Pillars of Simulacrum", inspired by Jean Baudrillard. "Etienne" and "Thatorchia" are instrumentals containing guitars and mechanical noise. Named after the architect Étienne-Louis Boullée, the former is made by acoustic guitar and piano, and ends with a speech about a suicidal man who attempts to induce a heart attack by excessively running to commit suicide. "Thatorchia" is a shoegaze song with a post-rock outro, which also incorporates religious imagery. NME's Kristen S. Hé believed that the guitar used on the track is similar to the ambient and shoegaze band Lovesliescrushing. "Thatorchia" is also the only song on the album that's completely an instrumental and does not have any lyrics. The project closes with the slowcore "Amber Waves", which is one of the more lyric-focused tracks. Its title references the poem "America the Beautiful", as well as the film The Reflecting Skin (1990). Over guitar and noise, the song depicts a toxic relationship; Cain reveals, "the devil I know is the devil I want". According to Gormely, "Amber Waves" is reminiscent to the works of the band American Football. The song and project end with the singer saying, "I can't feel anything".

== Release and promotion ==
In 2024, Cain debuted various songs at her third concert tour, the Childish Behaviour Tour, including "Punish" and "Amber Waves". In parallel, she published a video with a snippet of new music and clips from the horror film The Reflecting Skin. In October of the same year, Cain teased music on social media by sharing grainy and black-and-white photos captioned with words including "Apathy", "Disruption", and "Assimilation". The release of Perverts was announced on Cain's official Instagram account on October 14, 2024. The lead single from the project, titled "Punish", was released on November 1, 2024, alongside a music video directed by Cain and Silken Weinberg. On November 11, 2024, Cain revealed the track listing and cover artwork for Perverts. Ahead of its release, Clash, Vulture, and NME added it to lists of the most anticipated albums of 2025.

Perverts was released on January 8, 2025, through her record label Daughters of Cain under the distribution company AWAL. A music video for the fourth track, "Vacillator", premiered on the same date. Commercially, the project peaked at number 24 on the UK Album Downloads Chart issued for January 16, 2025. On January 10, Cain started a series of three weekly episodes premiering on NTS Radio, in which she fully played Perverts and provided commentary about the project. A 55-minute companion piece titled Perverts Meditation premiered on NTS, and she uploaded two demos to SoundCloud.

== Critical reception ==
Professional ratings
Aggregate scores
Source	Rating
AnyDecentMusic?	7.7/10
Metacritic	76/100
Review scores
Source	Rating
Clash	9/10
DIY	4/5 stars
Exclaim!	7/10
The Guardian	3/5 stars
The Independent	4/5 stars
The Line of Best Fit	8/10
NME	4/5 stars
Paste	7.6/10
Pitchfork	7.0/10
Slant Magazine	4/5 stars

On the review aggregator site Metacritic, which assigns a normalized score out of 100 to ratings from publications, Perverts holds a weighted mean of 76 based on 21 critics' reviews, indicating "generally favorable" reception. The site AnyDecentMusic? gave it a score of 7.7 out of 10, based on their assessment of the critical consensus from 25 reviews.

Critics viewed Perverts as a difficult project to listen to. Ludovic Hunter-Tilney of the Financial Times said that it "does not invite repeat visits", and he believed that "casual fans may not last even three minutes". The Line of Best Fit's Matthew Kim called it a different experience of music, and said that it would "open up" if one is "ready to plunge into the depths and emerge semi-alive". He named "Amber Waves" the "easiest" song to listen to. Sputnikmusic's reviewer stated that the project and song lengths "harmed [its] replay value", and described "Punish", "Amber Waves", and "Vacillator" as the most traditional tracks. Clash's Vicky Greer thought that the project is a "tough pill to swallow" for the fans that discovered Cain for the alternative pop song "American Teenager" (2022), while The Independent's Helen Brown believed it does not offer "stadium-singalong pop". For DIY, Ben Tipple said that how "enjoyable" the project is depends on how the listener is prepared, while Martin stated that it "demands [them] feel something".

Perverts received comparisons to Preacher's Daughter. Hé said that the project differs from the style of Cain's debut album, Tipple described it as a "vast sidestep", and Gormely similarly interpreted it as its opposite. Kim praised it for having "an even richer picture" than Preacher's Daughter. Alexis Petridis of The Guardian stated that the project succeeded if Cain wanted to "scale down her fanbase". He also compared her to other contemporary musicians, believing that she "is made of noticeably different stuff". Sasha Geffen of Pitchfork lauded Cain's multitracked voice, and wrote that "it scrapes off the lacquer that clung to it on earlier releases". Additionally, Tipple wrote that "a rating feels like a flimsy attempt to quantify [Perverts's] polarising creative confidence".

== Track listing ==
All tracks are written by Hayden Anhedönia (Ethel Cain).

Perverts track listing
No.	Title	Length
1.	"Perverts"	12:04
2.	"Punish"	6:40
3.	"Housofpsychoticwomn"	13:35
4.	"Vacillator"	7:44
5.	"Onanist"	6:24
6.	"Pulldrone"	15:14
7.	"Etienne"	8:43
8.	"Thatorchia"	7:24
9.	"Amber Waves"	11:32
Total length:		89:20

=== Notes ===
The title track contains an interpolation of "Nearer, My God, to Thee", written by Sarah Flower Adams and Lowell Mason.

== Personnel ==
- Ethel Cain – lead vocals, production, mixing
- Dale Becker – mastering
- Matthew Tomasi – drums on "Vacillator", boom on "Amber Waves"
- Angel Diaz – lap steel guitar on "Punish" and "Amber Waves", upright bass on "Onanist", electric piano on "Amber Waves"
- Bryan De Leon – acoustic guitar on "Etienne"
- Madeline Johnston – guitar on "Amber Waves"

== Charts ==
Chart performance for Perverts
Chart (2025)	Peak position
UK Album Downloads (Official Charts)	24
