= Blood Stained Blonde Tour =

2023 concert tour by Ethel Cain

- Tour by Ethel Cain
- Promotional poster for the last leg
- Location: Europe; North America; Oceania
- Associated album: Preacher's Daughter
- Start date: April 1, 2023
- End date: October 24, 2023
- No. of shows: 46
- Supporting acts: 9Million; Katie Day; King Woman; Midwife; Searows; Skullcrusher; Taahliah; Wulven
- Website: daughtersofcain.com/tour

Ethel Cain concert chronology
- The Freezer Bride Tour (2022); Blood Stained Blonde Tour (2023); The Childish Behaviour Tour (2024)

The Blood Stained Blonde Tour was the second concert tour by American singer-songwriter and producer Hayden Silas Anhedönia, under the stage name of Ethel Cain. Like the previous one, it served to promote the artist's debut studio album, Preacher's Daughter (2022), a critically acclaimed concept album. The 46-show tour began on April 1, 2023 in Mexico City and concluded on October 24, 2023 in San Francisco.

== Background ==
On March 17, 2022, Cain announced her debut studio album, Preacher's Daughter, which was stated to release on May 12. She released three singles to promote the record: "Gibson Girl", "Strangers", and "American Teenager". Also, she embarked on a concert tour the same year, titled the Freezer Bride Tour, which began on July 14, 2022 in Bloomington, Indiana, and concluded in London, England, on December 7.

At the end of 2022, American singer-songwriter Caroline Polachek announced her Spiraling Tour, in which Cain performed as an opening guest. In the first half of 2023, only months after finishing her previous one, Cain announced her second headlining concert tour, Blood Stained Blonde Tour, with North American dates on several festivals, such as Outside Lands Music and Arts Festival, Reading and Leeds Festivals, and others. She also announced dates opening for supergroup Boygenius in the United Kingdom. The last shows in the United States were confirmed on July 24, along with the supporting acts: 9Million, Skullcrusher, Midwive, Wulven, and King Woman.

The tour marked Cain's Coachella debut, and she was named as one of the "10 unmissable new acts to see" at the 2023 edition of the festival. Her participation at the festival, confirmed on January 10, received positive reviews from critics.

== Set list ==
This is the set list for Coachella on April 15, 2023, and it is not intended to represent all dates throughout the tour. Cain performed six songs from Preacher's Daughter and one from Inbred.

1. "Family Tree"
2. "American Teenager"
3. "A House in Nebraska"
4. "Thoroughfare"
5. "Gibson Girl"
6. "Sun Bleached Flies"
7. "Crush"

== Shows ==
List of concerts, showing date, city, country, venue, and opening acts
| Date | City | Country | Venue | Opening acts |
North America
| April 1 (Note: The show on April 1, 2023, was part of Festival Ceremonia.) | Mexico City | Mexico | Bicentennial Park | —N/a |
| April 15 (Note: The shows on April 15 and 22, 2023 were part of Coachella.) | Indio | United States | Empire Polo Club | —N/a |
| April 19 | Pomona | United States | The Glass House | Searows |
| April 22 | Indio | United States | Empire Polo Club | —N/a |
| April 30 (Note: Part of Brown University's Spring Weekend, only open to students.) | Providence | United States | Brown University | —N/a |
| May 14 (Note: The show on May 14, 2023 was part of the Kilby Block Party.) | Salt Lake City | United States | Utah State Fair | —N/a |
| May 16 (Note: The shows on May 16, 17, 19 and 20, 2023 were as the opening act for Caroline Polachek's Spiraling Tour.) | Chicago | United States | Riviera Theatre | —N/a |
| May 17 | Nashville | United States | Ryman Auditorium | —N/a |
| May 19 | Washington, D.C. | United States | The Anthem | —N/a |
| May 20 | New York | United States | Radio City Music Hall | —N/a |
Oceania
| June 2 (Note: The shows on June 2–4, 2023 were part of the Vivid Sydney festival.) | Sydney | Australia | Sydney Opera House (Drama Theatre) | —N/a |
| June 3 (Note: During the June 3 show in Sydney, Cain fainted during her performance of "A House in Nebraska", the third song of the night. The rest of her set was therefore cancelled.) | Sydney | Australia | Sydney Opera House (Drama Theatre) | —N/a |
| June 4 | Sydney | Australia | Sydney Opera House (Drama Theatre) | —N/a |
| June 6 | Brisbane | Australia | Queensland Performing Arts Centre | Katie Day |
| June 7 | Brisbane | Australia | Queensland Performing Arts Centre | Katie Day |
| June 9 (Note: The shows on June 9 and 10, 2023 were part of the Rising Melbourne festival.) | Melbourne | Australia | Forum Upstairs | —N/a |
| June 10 | Melbourne | Australia | Forum Upstairs | —N/a |
| June 11 (Note: The show on June 11, 2023 was part of the Dark Mofo festival.) | Hobart | Australia | Odeon Theatre | —N/a |
Europe
| June 29 (Note: The show on June 29, 2023 was part of the Roskilde Festival.) | Roskilde | Denmark | Roskilde Festival | —N/a |
| July 2 (Note: The show on July 2, 2023 was part of the Down the Rabbit Hole festival.) | Ewijk | Netherlands | De Groene Heuvels | —N/a |
North America
| August 5 (Note: The show on August 5 and August 6, 2023, were part of the Bleached Festival.) | San Diego | United States | Waterfront Park | —N/a |
| August 6 | San Diego | United States | Waterfront Park | —N/a |
| August 11 (Note: The show on August 11, 2023 was part of the Outside Lands Music and Arts Festival.) | San Francisco | United States | Golden Gate Park | —N/a |
| August 13 (Note: The show on August 13, 2023, was part of the Day in Day Out festival.) | Seattle | United States | Fisher Pavilion | —N/a |
Europe
| August 18 (Note: The show on August 18, 2023 was part of the Pukkelpop festival.) | Kiewit (Note: Promoted as Hasselt) | Belgium | Kempische Steenweg | —N/a |
| August 20 (Note: The shows on August 20, 22 and 23, 2023 was as the opening act for Boygenius's The Tour.) | London | England | Gunnersbury Park | —N/a |
| August 22 | Halifax | England | Piece Hall | —N/a |
| August 23 | Halifax | England | Piece Hall | —N/a |
| August 25 (Note: The show on August 25, 2023, was part of the Leeds Festival.) | Leeds | England | Little John's Farm | —N/a |
| August 26 (Note: The show on August 26, 2023, was part of Rock en Seine.) | Saint-Cloud (Note: Promoted as Paris) | France | Parc de Saint-Cloud | —N/a |
| August 27 (Note: The show on August 27, 2023, was part of the Reading Festival.) | Reading | England | Bramham Park | —N/a |
| August 29 (Note: The show on August 29, 2023 was originally to be held at Queen Margaret Union, but the venue was upgraded.) | Glasgow | Scotland | SWG3 | Taahliah |
| August 30 (Note: The show on August 30, 2023 was originally to be held at Band on the Wall, but the venue was upgraded.) | Manchester | England | New Century Hall | Taahliah |
| September 1 (Note: The show on September 1, 2023 was part of Meo Kalorama Festival.) | Lisbon | Portugal | Bela Vista Park | —N/a |
| September 2 (Note: The show on September 2, 2023 was part of Cala Mijas Festival.) | Málaga | Spain | Sonora Mijas | —N/a |
| September 3 (Note: The show on September 3, 2023 was part of the Electric Picnic.) | Stradbally | Ireland | Stradbally Hall | —N/a |
North America
| October 1 (Note: The show on October 1, 2023 was part of All Things Go Music Festival.) | Columbia (Note: Promoted as Washington, D.C.) | United States | Merriweather Post Pavilion | —N/a |
| October 3 | Burlington | United States | Higher Ground | 9Million |
| October 4 | Portland | United States | State Theatre | 9Million |
| October 5 | Hudson | United States | Basilica Hudson | Skullcrusher |
| October 7 | Pittsburgh | United States | The Andy Warhol Museum | —N/a |
| October 9 | Omaha | United States | Slowdown | Midwife |
| October 11 | New Orleans | United States | Toulouse Theatre | Wulven |
| October 14 (Note: The show on October 14, 2023 was part of the Austin City Limits Music Festival.) | Austin | United States | Zilker Park | —N/a |
| October 20 | Big Sur | United States | Henry Miller Library | —N/a |
| October 21 | Big Sur | United States | Henry Miller Library | —N/a |
| October 23 | San Francisco | United States | Castro Theatre | King Woman |
| October 24 | San Francisco | United States | Castro Theatre | King Woman |

=== Cancelled dates ===
| Date (2023) | City | Country | Venue | Reason |
|---|---|---|---|---|
| March 17 (Note: The show on March 17, 2023, would've been part of the Luck Reunion festival.) | Spicewood | United States | Luck Ranch | Weather |
| September 29 (Note: The show on September 29, 2023 would have been part of Treeline Music Fest.) | Columbia | United States | Stephens Lake Park | Festival cancelled |
