= Famous Last Words (An Ode to Eaters) =

2023 single by 1017 ALYX 9SM and Ethel Cain

Single by Ethel Cain

from the album 1017 ALYX 9SM Compilation Vol. 1
- Released: July 21, 2023
- Length: 3:22
- Label: Alamo Records
- Songwriter: Hayden Silas Anhedönia
- Producer: Hayden Silas Anhedönia

1017 ALYX 9SM singles chronology
"Famous Last Words (An Ode to Eaters)" (2023)	"Warriors" (2023)

Ethel Cain singles chronology
"American Teenager" (2022)	"Famous Last Words (An Ode to Eaters)" (2023)	"For Sure" (2024)

Music video
- "Famous Last Words (An Ode to Eaters)" on YouTube

"Famous Last Words (An Ode to Eaters)" is a song by American singer-songwriter Hayden Anhedönia, known professionally as Ethel Cain. The debut single of the 1017 ALYX 9SM project by Givenchy creative director Matthew Williams, it was released on July 21, 2023, as the lead single from the collaboration album Compilation Vol. 1. The song was entirely written and produced by Cain, and marks the singer's first official release since her critically acclaimed concept album Preacher's Daughter (2022). A self-directed music video was released alongside the song.

== Background and composition ==
Inspired by the love story of the horror film Bones and All (2022), directed by Luca Guadagnino, the song was first published on SoundCloud in 2022, becoming a "fan favorite", and was officially released a year later. Cain said "this [song's] for Lee and Maren" – referring to the characters played by Timothée Chalamet and Taylor Russell in the film.

Rain Magazine described "Famous Last Words (An Ode to Eaters)" as "a powerful narrative of escape and entrapment", and Cain "weaves raw emotions into her haunting melodies".

== Music video ==
A music video was released alongside the song on July 21, 2023. It was directed by Anhedönia and Silken Weinberg. The video narrates "a suitably claustrophobic affair, capturing the artist as she lets the light in to a grungey apartment." It was described as "darkly poignant", and "hauntingly beautiful". According to Glitter Magazine, "the video showcases a darker side of Cain, transforming the piece into a horror-short with gothic overtones and terrifying imagery".
