= Morning Elvis =

2022 promotional single by Florence and the Machine

- Live version cover

Song by Florence and the Machine

from the album Dance Fever
- Released: 9 December 2022
- Length: 4:22; 4:15 (live version)
- Label: Polydor
- Songwriters: Florence Welch; Dave Bayley
- Producers: Florence Welch; Dave Bayley; Jack Antonoff

Audio video
- "Morning Elvis" (live version) on YouTube

"Morning Elvis" is a song by English indie rock band Florence and the Machine and the closing track of their fifth studio album, Dance Fever, released on 13 May 2022 through Polydor Records. It was written by the band's leader, Florence Welch, along with Dave Bayley, and produced by them with Jack Antonoff. A live performance version of the song recorded in Denver, in collaboration with American singer-songwriter Ethel Cain, was released as a promotional single on 9 December 2022.

== Background and release ==
A live performance of the track recorded at a concert in Denver was released on 9 December 2022 as a promotional single. Following the release, Ethel Cain explained: "I was giggling when we rehearsed the song just the two of us before the show because Florence told me that 'Morning Elvis' was her channelling her inner Southern rocker, and I told her I couldn't stop myself from emulating her British accent on certain words. It felt like a holy convergence happening in a basketball arena". The band's leader, Florence Welch, also shared:

"'Morning Elvis' is a song about the power of performance. Of rock and roll tragedy and transcendence. And it's a sign of a truly special artist when they make a cover their own. When Hayden sang this song it felt like it was hers, she really gave it that outlaw energy, like witches of the Wild West. I even threw more lines at her on the day because her tone and cadence was so perfect I wanted to hear more. And she did not miss a line even with only an hour to rehearse. I truly think I have found a kindred spirit aesthetically and artistically. And now every show I sing 'Morning Elvis' with an Ethel Cain inflection".

In 2023, the singers performed two duets at the Meo Kelorama Festival held in Lisbon. During Cain's set, they performed "Thoroughfare", a track from her debut studio album, Preacher's Daughter, while, subsequently, they reunited during the band's set to perform "Morning Elvis" live for the second time.

== Critical reception ==
Writing for USA Today, Melissa Ruggieri described "Morning Elvis" as "a wrenching reflection of [Welch's] drinking days", a throwback to when she missed a flight to Memphis with the band. The critic noted that "guitars seesaw woozily in the background, creating the sound of disorientation". Far Out's Jamie Kahn said that the choice to end the record with "Morning Elvis" was "odd", but defined the song as "immaculate [...] relaxed and melodic". Steven Ward of Grimy Goods stated that the song "works so much better as a duet", while adding about the live version: "Ethel's low resounding coos are such an explicitly perfect compliment to Florence's euphonious trill". American Songwriter's Alli Patton named it "spellbinding" and "enchanting". While reviewing the song for Paper Magazine, Kenna McCafferty stated that the pair's "shared occult-Americana sound adds even more magic" to it. The Paste staff stated that the live version "is full and warm at the same time as it is heavy and dripping with sadness. The singers trade verses, sharing a wish for survival between them. The artists both have similarly rooted, feeling voices, full of drama and comfort, complimenting each other and building up the other’s sound. Their harmonies ring freely and fly."
