= Ethel Cain =

American singer-songwriter (born 1998)

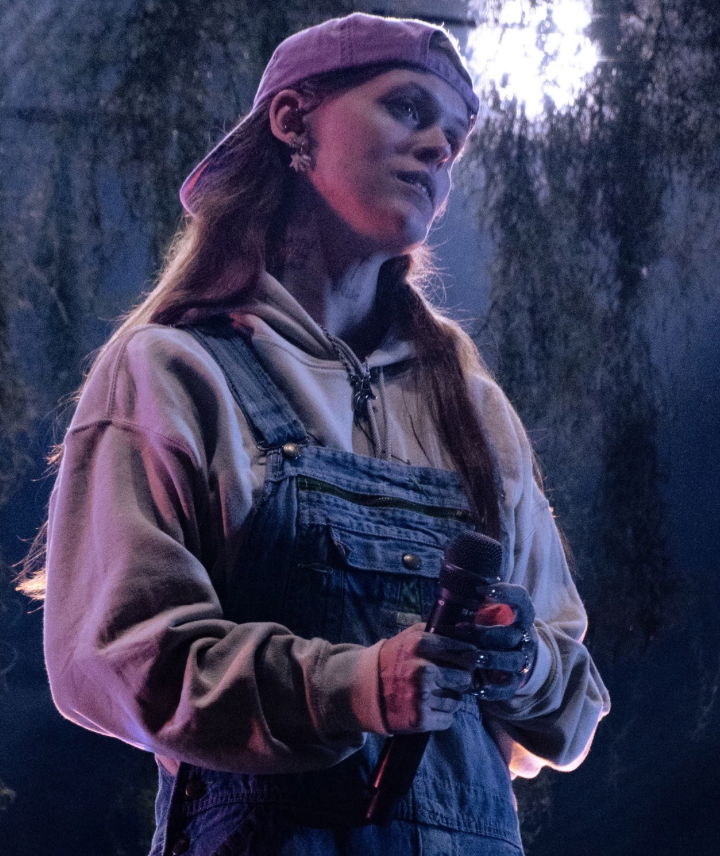
- Cain performing in 2026
- Born: March 24, 1998 (age 28); Tallahassee, Florida, U.S.
- Other names: Hayden Silas Anhedönia; White Silas
- Occupations: Singer-songwriter; record producer; model
- Years active: 2017–present
- Works: Songs; live performances
- Musical career
- Genres: Indie rock; gothic country; folk; alternative rock; slowcore; Americana; ambient
- Instruments: Vocals; piano; guitar; harmonica; bass
- Labels: Daughters of Cain; Homie Shit Magazine; AWAL
- Website: daughtersofcain.com

Hayden Silas Anhedönia (/ˌænhɪˈdoʊniə/; born March 24, 1998), known professionally as Ethel Cain, is an American singer-songwriter, record producer, and model. She became known for her ambient and Southern Gothic-style music and lyrics. She began releasing recordings under various aliases, (Note: While Ethel Cain is her main project, Anhedönia has had other projects under different monikers, including White Silas) before releasing multiple extended plays including Inbred (2021) which garnered various singles including "Crush".

Cain released her debut studio album, Preacher's Daughter (2022), to acclaim from critics and garnered a cult following. After a vinyl release in 2025, the album debuted at number ten on the US Billboard 200 chart. She released the studio recording Perverts (2025), which saw her experimenting with drone music. Later that year, she released her second studio album, Willoughby Tucker, I'll Always Love You (2025), which served as a lyrical prequel to her debut album.

== Early life ==
Hayden Silas Anhedönia was born on March 24, 1998. She is the eldest of four children in a Southern Baptist family. Her father was a deacon, and she was involved in the church choir from a young age, like her mother. At age 8, Anhedönia began studying classical piano, with musical influences from a variety of Christian music, as well as Florence Welch, who served as Anhedönia's inspiration as she wrote her first album as a teenager. The church was Anhedönia's first exposure to music: "My whole life was always singing, always, always music all the time", she said. She left the church at the age of 16. Anhedönia was homeschooled.

== Career ==
=== 2017–2021: Career beginnings and EPs ===
Anhedönia officially started making music in 2017, experimenting with "dreamy bedroom pop demos" under different monikers. As White Silas, she first published Gregorian chant-inspired singles and mixtapes to SoundCloud and Tumblr, the latter now having been deactivated and no longer associated with the artist. In 2019, Anhedönia started recording music as Ethel Cain, which became her current main project. For the new moniker, she thought of a "womanly, matronly, old American name", while also taking inspiration from the biblical figure of Cain. Her first extended play as Ethel Cain, Carpet Bed, consisted of four songs and was released on September 13, 2019. Months later, she released her second EP, Golden Age, on December 1. After the latter's release, she was backed by the artist Wicca Phase Springs Eternal, who praised her for her "mature songwriting and understanding of melody". In January 2020, after recommendation from Wicca Phase Springs Eternal, Cain was discovered by the rapper Lil Aaron while headlining a show with Edith Underground, Girlfiend, and Lil Bo Weep in Los Angeles. She was then invited by him to meet with the publishing company Prescription Songs and signed with them soon after.

In February 2021, Cain released her debut single as Ethel Cain while under the new publishing contract, "Michelle Pfeiffer", which featured Lil Aaron. The song was described by Billboard as alternative rock, folk, pop and "even country". Her second single, "Crush", followed on March 18 and received a music video on August 3. The two singles were part of her third EP, Inbred, which was released on April 23. The ambient-folk and slowcore EP was named by Pitchfork as one of The 49 Most Anticipated Albums of Spring 2021 and received a score of 7.6 out of 10 by the website. Later on August 24, a stripped version of "Crush" was also published. On March 8, 2022, she released a cover of the song "Everytime" by Britney Spears as part of Spotify Singles, in observance of International Women's Day.

=== 2022–2024: Breakthrough with Preacher's Daughter ===
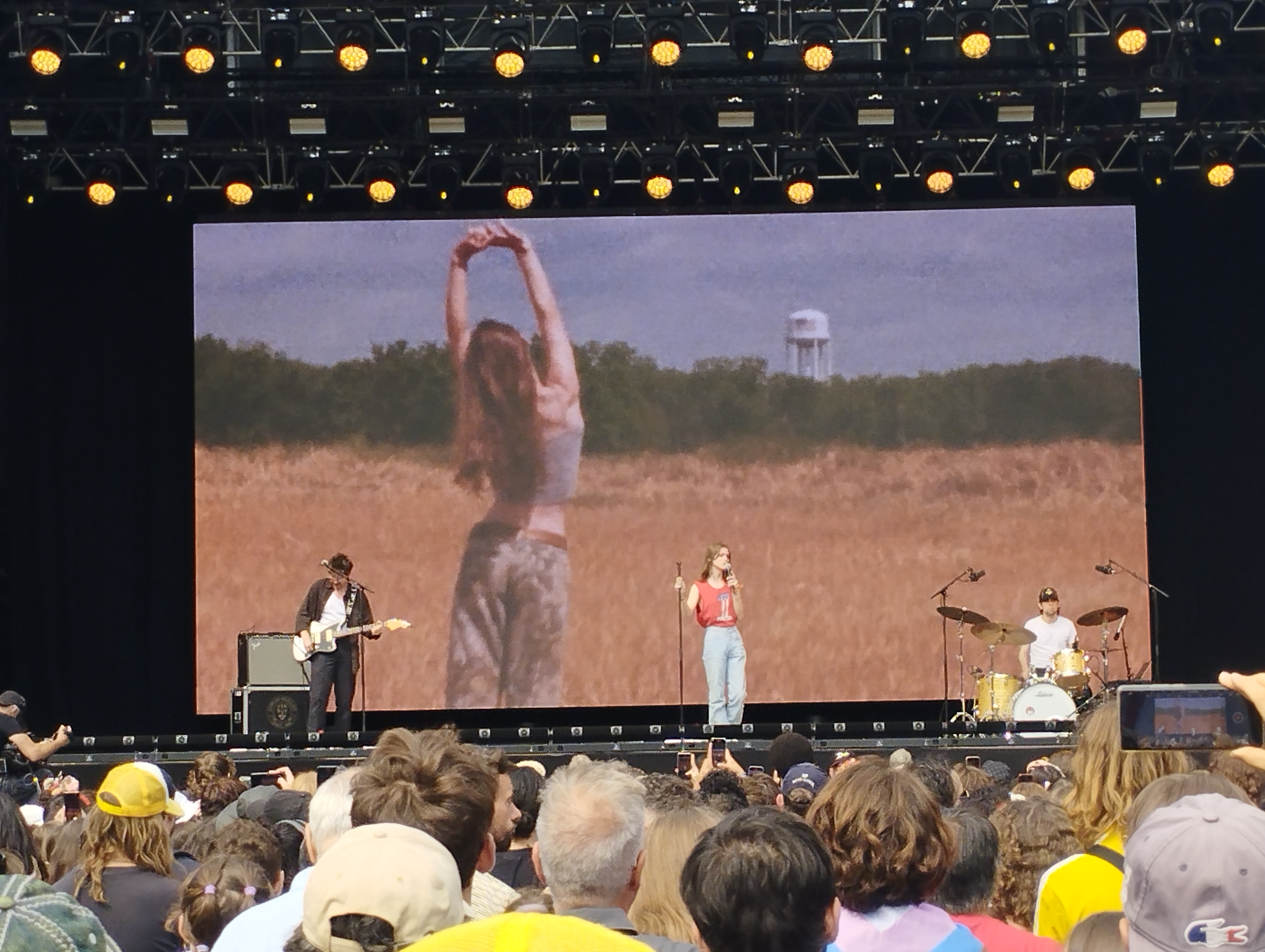
Anhedönia performing at the Rock en Seine festival in 2023, as part of her Blood Stained Blonde Tour

On March 17, 2022, Cain released the single "Gibson Girl" and subsequently announced her debut album, titled Preacher's Daughter and released on May 12, 2022, through her own record label, Daughters of Cain. A concept album that creates a narrative "centered around the character Ethel Cain", it received a positive reception from music critics and was named one of the best albums of the year. (Note: Attributed to multiple references:) It was also preceded by the release of the singles "Strangers" on April 7 and "American Teenager" on April 21, the latter receiving a music video on July 21. In support of the album, Cain embarked on the Freezer Bride Tour in 2022 and the Blood Stained Blonde Tour in 2023. She was also an opening act at one concert of Florence and the Machine's Dance Fever Tour and Caroline Polachek's Spiraling Tour.

Cain performed at the 22nd Coachella Valley Music and Arts Festival in April 2023. On June 3, 2023, Cain fainted on stage while performing at the Sydney Opera House in Sydney, Australia, as part of Vivid Live, resulting in the show's cancellation. She returned to performing the next day. She also performed at Reading Festival and Gunnersbury Park with Boygenius and Muna in August 2023. On December 5, 2023, Cain announced the Childish Behaviour Tour, an eight-show tour that began on June 3, 2024 and was slated to end on June 27, 2024. After sharing the song on SoundCloud a year before, on July 21, 2023, she released "Famous Last Words (An Ode to Eaters)", inspired by Luca Guadagnino's film Bones and All, along with 1017 ALYX 9SM. With a "darkly poignant" music video, it was included in the project's first compilation album. In that year, Cain appeared as a guest vocalist on the songs "Dying Star" by Ashnikko and "222" by Angel Diaz (also known as Vyva Melinkolya) from the albums Weedkiller and Unbecoming, respectively.

Cain placed on the Forbes 30 Under 30 2024 for Music. She opened for Mitski's 2024 concert tour in support of her album The Land Is Inhospitable and So Are We (2023). On February 14, 2024, she released a song titled "من النهر" (meaning "From the River"), which she described as a "prayer" for Palestinians. On September 5, 2024, Cain released a cover of the track "For Sure", which appeared on American Football: Covers, a cover album by the American emo band American Football in tribute to their 1999 record of the same name. Days later, they performed the track together at the El Rey Theatre in Los Angeles.

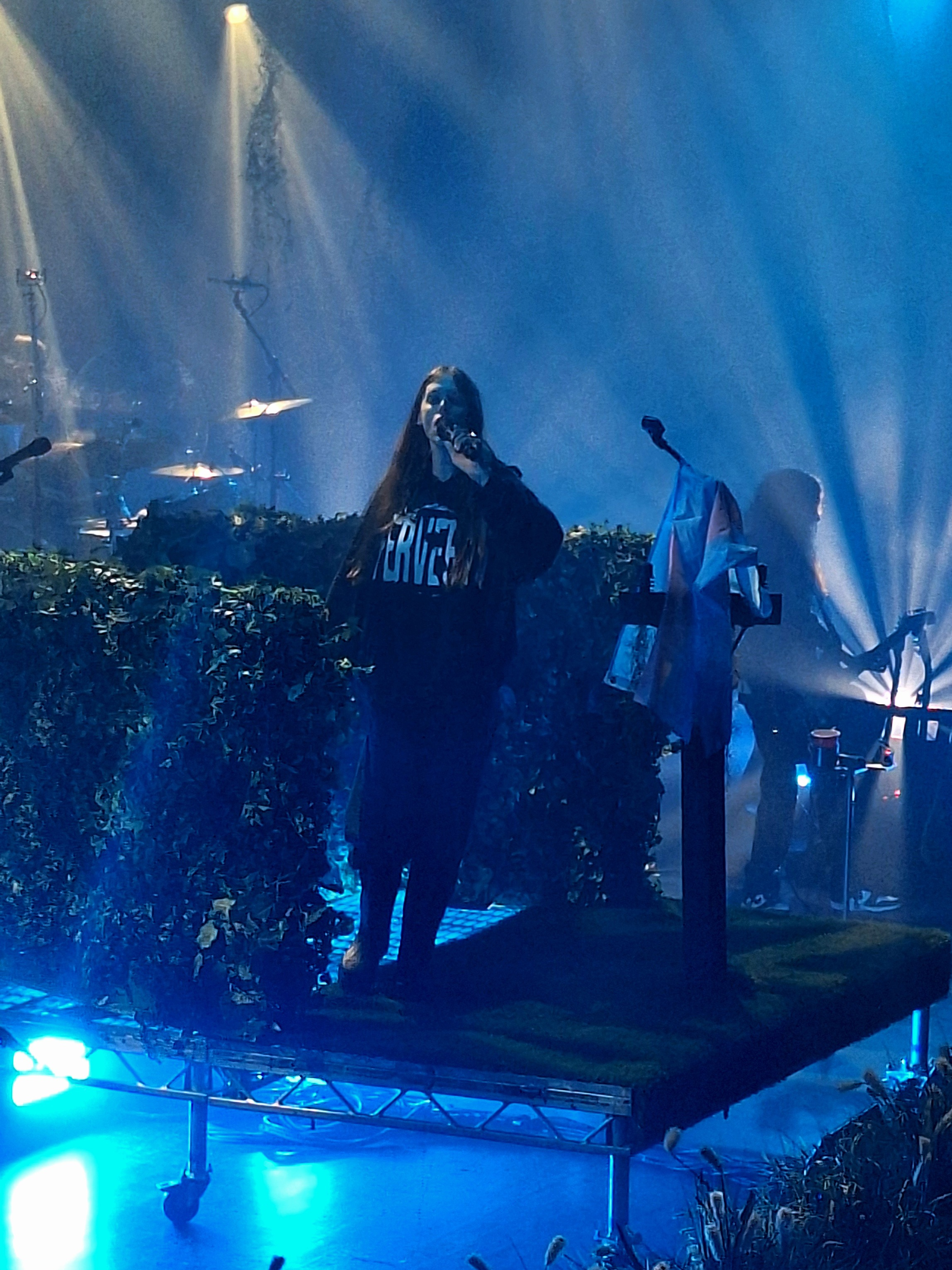
Anhedönia performing in Utrecht in October 2025

=== 2025–present: Willoughby Tucker, I'll Always Love You ===
On January 8, 2025, Cain released the studio recording Perverts. An experimental drone project, it was preceded by the release of the lead single, "Punish". Cain stated that she decided to release it since she liked the genre and wanted to make drone music of her own. In April 2025, Preacher's Daughter received a vinyl release, which caused it to debut on various charts worldwide, including the US Billboard 200 at number ten, marking her first entry on the chart. The album also debuted atop Billboard's Top Album Sales chart.

Cain's second studio album, Willoughby Tucker, I'll Always Love You, was released on August 8, 2025. The album was preceded by the singles "Nettles", and "Fuck Me Eyes". The album serves as a prequel to Preacher's Daughter and accompanied by the Willoughby Tucker Forever Tour.

In October 2026 it was reported by The Hollywood Reporter, that Cain recorded a song called "Wynter Waxeth" for Robert Eggers' upcoming horror movie Werwulf. This was later confirmed by the film's editor Louise Ford. The song was released on November 13, 2026.

== Artistry ==
Cain's musical style has been classified as indie rock, gothic, contemporary folk, alternative pop, slowcore, Americana, and ambient. She also finds inspiration from gospel music, country music, classic rock, and alternative music. After Cain gained popularity with her single "Crush", which is more pop-oriented than her usual alternative style, from her EP Inbred (2021), she talked about her "fear" of making pop music, saying that "once you make pop music, your other genres won't be taken as seriously", but "she has worked to make the music she wants." Cain plans to release a book surrounding the story of her album Preacher's Daughter alongside a film once her trilogy albums are released.

Music critics have praised the "cinematography" in her songs, due to Cain's interest in movies and building songs with scenes and characters. According to BroadwayWorld, Cain musically combines "elements of rock, country and cinematic nostalgia" paired with "ethereal vocals and raw lyrics to create her unique sound". Her early musical influences included Karen Carpenter, the Steve Miller Band, and a variety of Christian music. Cain has named Florence Welch, lead vocalist of the band Florence and the Machine, as her "teen idol". Other influences she has cited include Björk, Title Fight, Chelsea Wolfe, King Woman, Velvetears, Nicole Dollanganger, Avril Lavigne, Michelle Tumes, Jaci Velasquez and Nichole Nordeman.

== Personal life ==
=== Sexuality and identity ===
Anhedönia came out as gay to her family at the age of 12, and on her 20th birthday, she publicly came out as a trans woman: "As I got older, I found out there were other options", she said. Reflecting on this, she recalled: "It was made clear to everyone that I was not like other people. Whenever I started to develop, I started to come into my own as a trans woman. We were a house divided—it was me versus my whole town." The singer later identified herself as a bisexual woman.

She is autistic, which she learned upon seeking a diagnosis in her adulthood. Reflecting on how being autistic has impacted her artistry, she has stated:

I'm autistic, and so that definitely heightens sensory everything. [...] I think that's why I have so much crossover between media, because it's like, there's never just one sense. Music is not just something you listen to. Film is not just something you watch. You get all these senses from all these things. When I'm producing music, I literally feel sometimes I can see it. I have to close my eyes, and I imagine the bass is the earth. I imagine the synths are rising up next to you, and I imagine the vocals are high in the sky, right in the center. I close my eyes and picture the sound around me – that's how I mix.

=== Religious beliefs ===
Reflecting on her religious upbringing in a 2021 interview, Cain said that she still considered herself a Southern Baptist: "Whether I like it or not, God always has and always will be a huge part of my life. Whether he's being used as a comforting figure or a threat, I've always been surrounded by it. It's not really something you can walk away from. And I'd rather just sit with it than be like 'Fuck the church!'"

In an interview for Rolling Stone in August 2023, she revealed that all of her family have since left the church, though she clarified they are still religious in some ways. She elaborated in a Tumblr post in 2022 that she does not consider herself a Christian, nor as someone who cares about religion. However, she "still abides by the values [she] was raised on", such as kindness, graciousness, and loving her neighbor.

=== Political views ===
The lyrics of Cain's song "American Teenager" express anti-war sentiment, political and religious disillusionment, and criticisms of US gun culture. It was included by former President of the United States Barack Obama in his list of favorite songs of 2022, which prompted surprise from Cain that a former president had included her "anti-war, anti-patriotism fake pop song" in his end-of-year list.

On February 14, 2024, she released a song on SoundCloud titled "من النهر" ("Min an-Nahr"; Arabic for 'From the River'), a reference to the pro-Palestinian phrase "from the river to the sea". She has expressed disapproval of United States presidents Joe Biden and Donald Trump. Additionally, she expressed support for Luigi Mangione, the man who killed the UnitedHealthcare CEO Brian Thompson.

=== Criticism of past social media posts ===
On July 6, 2025, social media posts by Cain from 2017 and 2018 resurfaced online after being shared by an account on X, in which she admitted to making racist comments. The X account also shared a picture of Cain wearing a homemade t-shirt that read "legalize incest". During this time, Cain's Spotify page was also hacked. On July 9, Cain issued a 2,000-word response to the backlash, in which she took responsibility for the derogatory posts and also described the leaking of the screenshots and other allegations as part of a "transphobic/otherwise targeted smear campaign". She discussed the controversy with the Popcast podcast on July 30, 2025.

On August 14, 2025, American singer-songwriter Lana Del Rey posted a video to Instagram containing a snippet that included lyrics referencing Ethel Cain. Del Rey later elaborated on why she made the song, explaining: "I didn't know who Ethel was until a few years ago — when someone brought to my attention the disturbing and graphic side-by-side images she would often put up of me next to unflattering creatures and cartoon characters making constant comments about my weight [...] Then when I heard what she was saying behind closed doors from mutual friends and started inserting herself into my personal life I was definitely disturbed." On the same day, Cain posted an Instagram story claiming that Del Rey had blocked her on Instagram, but did not confirm or deny Del Rey's accusation. Del Rey would go on to deem Cain "abusive". Although never proven, it has been heavily speculated that Del Rey was referring to a tweet by Cain of a Peter Griffin dancing gif alongside the lyrics of Del Rey's song "Peppers."

== Other ventures ==
Cain began modeling in campaigns for Givenchy, Miu Miu, and Marc Jacobs, and debuted on the New York Fashion Week runway for Eckhaus Latta. On February 6, 2025, IMG Models signed Cain as part of their roster.

== Discography ==
- Preacher's Daughter (2022)
- Willoughby Tucker, I'll Always Love You (2025)

== Tours ==
Headlining

- The Freezer Bride Tour (2022)
- Blood Stained Blonde Tour (2023)
- The Childish Behaviour Tour (2024)
- The Willoughby Tucker Forever Tour (2025-2026)

Opening act

- Florence & The Machine – Dance Fever Tour (2022)
- Caroline Polachek – Spiraling Tour (2023)
- Boygenius – The Tour (2023)
- Mitski – The Land Is Inhospitable and So Are We Tour (2024)

== Accolades ==
=== Awards and nominations ===
List of award nominations, with the year of ceremony, recipient(s), category, and result
Award	Year (Note: Each year is linked to the article about the awards held that year, wherever possible.)	Recipient(s)	Category	Result	Ref.
GLAAD Media Award	2023	Cain	Outstanding Breakthrough Music Artist	Nominated	

=== Listicles ===
Name of publisher, name of listicle, year(s) listed, and placement result
Publisher	Listicle	Year(s)	Result	Ref.
Forbes	30 Under 30	2024	Placed	
