= The Freezer Bride Tour =

2022 concert tour by Ethel Cain

- Tour by Ethel Cain
- Promotional poster for the European leg
- Location: Europe; North America
- Associated album: Preacher's Daughter
- Start date: July 14, 2022
- End date: December 7, 2022
- Legs: 2
- No. of shows: 37
- Supporting acts: Colyer; Estrada; Kavari

Ethel Cain concert chronology
- The Freezer Bride Tour (2022); Blood Stained Blonde Tour (2023)

The Freezer Bride Tour was the first concert tour by American singer-songwriter Hayden Silas Anhedönia under the stage name Ethel Cain, in support of her debut studio album Preacher's Daughter (2022). The tour began on July 14, 2022 in Bloomington, Indiana, and concluded in London, England, on December 7.

== Background ==
On March 17, 2022, alongside the release of "Gibson Girl", Cain announced her debut studio album, Preacher's Daughter, which was stated to release on May 12. At the beginning of June of the same year, the singer revealed she would be kicking off her first concert tour across the United States. Weeks after, she announced several dates across Europe; in the United Kingdom, Germany, Netherlands and France.

== Critical reception ==
The show was described by Variety as "the average length of a revivalist preacher's sermon, delivered to an audience just as transfixed." Her vocals were "by turns restrained and sultry, joyous and meditative". According to the magazine, Cain "takes audience interaction to a new level, not only touching their hands but sometimes holding them, gazing into fans' eyes unwaveringly." About the songs, the singer "articulates the stories so deliciously."

== Setlist ==
This set list is representative of the show on September 2, 2022, in Dallas, Texas. It is not intended to represent all dates throughout the tour. Cain performed seven songs from Preacher's Daughter and two from Inbred.

1. "Strangers"
2. "American Teenager"
3. "A House in Nebraska"
4. "Family Tree"
5. "Thoroughfare"
6. "Crying During Sex"
7. "Gibson Girl"
8. "Crush"
9. "Sun Bleached Flies"

== Shows ==
List of concerts, showing date, city, country, venue, and opening acts
Date	City	Country	Venue	Opening acts
North America
July 14	Bloomington	United States	The Bishop	Colyer
July 15 (Note: The show on July 15, 2022, was part of the Pitchfork Music Festival.)	Chicago	United States	Union Park	—N/a
July 16 (Note: The show on July 16, 2022 was the Pitchfork Music Festival after show.)	Chicago	United States	The Empty Bottle	Colyer
July 18	Detroit	United States	El Club	Colyer
July 19 (Note: The show on July 19, 2022, was originally to be held at the Horseshoe Tavern, but was moved to Lee's Palace due to technical difficulties.)	Toronto	Canada	Lee's Palace	Colyer
July 20	Montreal	Canada	Le Ritz PDB	Colyer
July 22	Boston	United States	Brighton Music Hall	Colyer
July 23	Philadelphia	United States	Johnny Brenda's	Colyer
July 24	Washington, D.C.	United States	Union Stage	Colyer
July 27	Richmond	United States	Richmond Music Hall	Colyer
July 28	Asheville	United States	The Grey Eagle	Colyer
July 30	Gainesville	United States	High Dive	Colyer
July 31	Tallahassee	United States	926 Bar	Colyer
August 5 (Note: The show on August 5, 2022, was part of the Vortex festival.)	Denver	United States	The Junk Yard	—N/a
August 20	Seattle	United States	Neumos	Colyer
August 21	Vancouver	Canada	Wise Hall	Colyer
August 22	Portland	United States	Mississippi Studios	Colyer
August 25	San Francisco	United States	The Independent	Colyer
August 27 (Note: The show on August 27, 2022, was part of the This Ain't No Picnic festival.)	Pasadena	United States	Brookside Golf Course	—N/a
August 28 (Note: The shows on August 28 and September 1, 2022, were part of Here and There Festival.)	San Diego	United States	Humphrey's Concerts by the Bay	—N/a
August 30	Phoenix	United States	Valley Bar	Colyer
September 1	Austin	United States	Moody Theater	—N/a
September 2	Dallas	United States	Sons of Hermann Hall	Colyer
September 3	Houston	United States	White Oak Music Hall	Colyer
September 6	Atlanta	United States	The Earl	Colyer
September 7	Nashville	United States	Basement East	Colyer
September 9	New York	United States	Bowery Ballroom	Colyer
September 10	New York	United States	Bowery Ballroom	Colyer
September 12	New York	United States	Music Hall of Williamsburg	Colyer
October 1 (Note: Cain's show on October 1, 2022, was the opening act for Florence and the Machine's Dance Fever Tour.)	Denver	United States	Ball Arena	—N/a
November 3	Los Angeles	United States	The Fonda Theatre	Estrada
November 4	Los Angeles	United States	The Fonda Theatre	Estrada
Europe
December 1	Berlin	Germany	Silent Green	—N/a
December 3	Amsterdam	Netherlands	Paradiso	—N/a
December 4	Paris	France	La Boule Noire	—N/a
December 6	London	England	Omeara	—N/a
December 7	London	England	Heaven	Kavari
