= American Teenager =

2022 single by Ethel Cain

Single by Ethel Cain

from the album Preacher's Daughter
- Released: April 21, 2022
- Genre: Heartland rock; pop
- Length: 4:18
- Label: Daughters of Cain
- Songwriters: Hayden Silas Anhedönia; Steven Mark Colyer
- Producer: Ethel Cain

Ethel Cain singles chronology
"Strangers" (2022)	"American Teenager" (2022)	"Famous Last Words (An Ode to Eaters)" (2023)

Music video
- "American Teenager" on YouTube

"American Teenager" is a song by American singer-songwriter and record producer Ethel Cain from her debut studio album, Preacher's Daughter (2022). It was released through her record label, Daughters of Cain, on April 21, 2022, as the third and final single from the album. Cain produced the song and wrote it with Steven Mark Colyer.

Inspired by photographs of her mother's time as a high school cheerleader, she wrote the song to criticize the unrealistic expectations of being a teenager in the United States. She was initially concerned that making pop music would undermine her non-pop songs, but later decided to not let this affect her. It is a heartland rock and pop song driven by synthesizers, guitar, and drums. A song about intergenerational trauma, its lyricism offers cultural commentary criticizing gun culture in the United States, unraveling the concept of the "American Dream", and expresses anti-war themes. Numerous reviewers compared the track's sound to other musicians, especially Taylor Swift and Bruce Springsteen; Cain has cited the latter as a longtime inspiration.

Upon its release, "American Teenager" was positively received by music critics, several of whom deemed it a standout from Preacher's Daughter. Critics enjoyed the emotional contrast between the upbeat production and the melancholic lyrics, the song's lyrical complexity, emotional depth and imagery, the song's blend of genres, and Cain's ability to make an accessible track while maintaining a distinct sound. Several publications deemed it one of the best songs of 2022, and it also made select mid-decade lists. It also appeared in Rolling Stone's 2023 list of the most inspirational LGBTQ songs of all time and Billboard's 2024 list of the best LGBTQ anthems of all time. Former President of the United States Barack Obama named it one of his favorite songs of 2022, and American singer-songwriter Gracie Abrams recorded a cover version of the song in February 2024.

Cain directed and edited the music video for "American Teenager", which was filmed by Silken Weinberg in Cain's hometown of Perry, Florida. She wore her mother's cheerleading uniform to the city's high school football field to take after her. The video pays homage to the emo band American Football and contains footage of the September 11 attacks. Cain performed "American Teenager" live at several festivals and included it in the setlists of the Freezer Bride Tour in 2022 and the Blood Stained Blonde Tour in 2023.

== Background and release ==
After leaving her family's home in Florida when she was age 18, Cain began her gender transition process and began working on her debut album, Preacher's Daughter (2022). She had been working on the album's story throughout the majority of her life; its narrative revolves around an American girl that runs away from her home only to meet a violent end with a cannibal. She announced the album alongside the release of its lead single, "Gibson Girl", on March 17, 2022. It was followed by the second single, "Strangers", on April 7. "American Teenager" was released as the third and final single from the album on April 21, through her record label, Daughters of Cain. It was released alongside a visualizer, which depicts Cain sitting on a picnic table, drinking cans of Budweiser, and appearing tired on a sunny day. Alongside the release of the single, she also announced the Freezer Bride Tour and revealed its North American dates for July 2022.

Cain was inspired to write "American Teenager" after looking at old photographs of her mother's time as a cheerleader in high school. She wrote the song to criticize the unrealistic expectations of being a teenager in the United States. She stated that she was surrounded by "visions of NASCAR, rock'n'roll, and being the one who would change everything" when growing up. She also commented on how the people around her growing up made her believe that everything is achievable, though did not tell her that "you need your neighbor more than your country needs you". Commenting on making a song with a more mainstream sound than the rest of her discography, Cain stated she was "scared that if [she] made pop music, [she] wouldn't be taken seriously for the non-pop songs", but later felt as if she was "getting to the point where [she] [does not] care". Cain produced the song herself and wrote it with Steven Mark Colyer. (Note: Cain is credited by her real name, Hayden Silas Anhedönia.)

== Music and lyrics ==
"American Teenager"
The chorus of "American Teenager", displaying the song's synthesizers, guitar, and drums, as well as Ethel Cain's reverbed vocals.

"American Teenager" is 4 minutes and 18 seconds long. It is a heartland rock (Note: Attributed to Pitchfork's Evan Rytlewski, The Guardian's Shaad D'Souza, Paper's Jacqueline Codiga, American Songwriter's Em Casalena, and Paste's Clare Martin.) and pop (Note: Attributed to Clash's Oshen Douglas-McCormick, DIY's Ben Tipple and Elly Watson, The Guardian's Phil Mongredien, and Pitchfork's Nadine Smith.) song with elements of country rock and folk music. It has also been described as an ambient pop, indie folk, pop rock, and arena rock track by select music publications. It is driven by synthesizers, guitar, and drums with a hook reminiscent of rock music from the 1980s. Cain's vocals, and the track itself, contain considerable amounts of reverb. Its guitar riff is a sample of the song "Don't Stop Believin'" (1981) by the American rock band Journey. "American Teenager" is the most upbeat song on Preacher's Daughter and was seen as its most commercially appealing track by Paul Bridgewater from The Line of Best Fit. Pitchfork's Olivia Horn deemed it Cain's "closest brush with pop's mainstream". Writing for Billboard, Stephen Daw felt it had a more uplifting sound compared to Cain's previous material.

"American Teenager" is about intergenerational trauma, with lyrics that offer cultural commentary criticizing gun culture in the United States, unraveling the concept of the "American Dream", as well as expressing anti-war themes. The lyric "The neighbor's brother came home in a box" challenges the idea of a person serving their country, while "Jesus, if you're there, why do I feel alone in this room with you?" questions the idea of a person loving their god. The song evokes imagery of a high school football team, nights that went wrong, and prayers to Jesus. Its isolation-influenced lyrics about crying on a set of bleachers and witnessing caskets come back from war are used in a way to promote her sense of self-determination. Cain references the American racing driver Dale Earnhardt in the lyric "I do it for my daddy and I do it for Dale", and the song ends with the line "I'm doing what I want / And damn, I'm doing it well / For me", showing that the one thing Cain believes in is herself. Bridgewater highlighted that the track, alongside the album songs "Family Tree" and "Gibson Girl", contain "lyrics that paint a Southern Gothic world filled with the scent of Marlboro Reds, and waffle-house [sic] coffee".

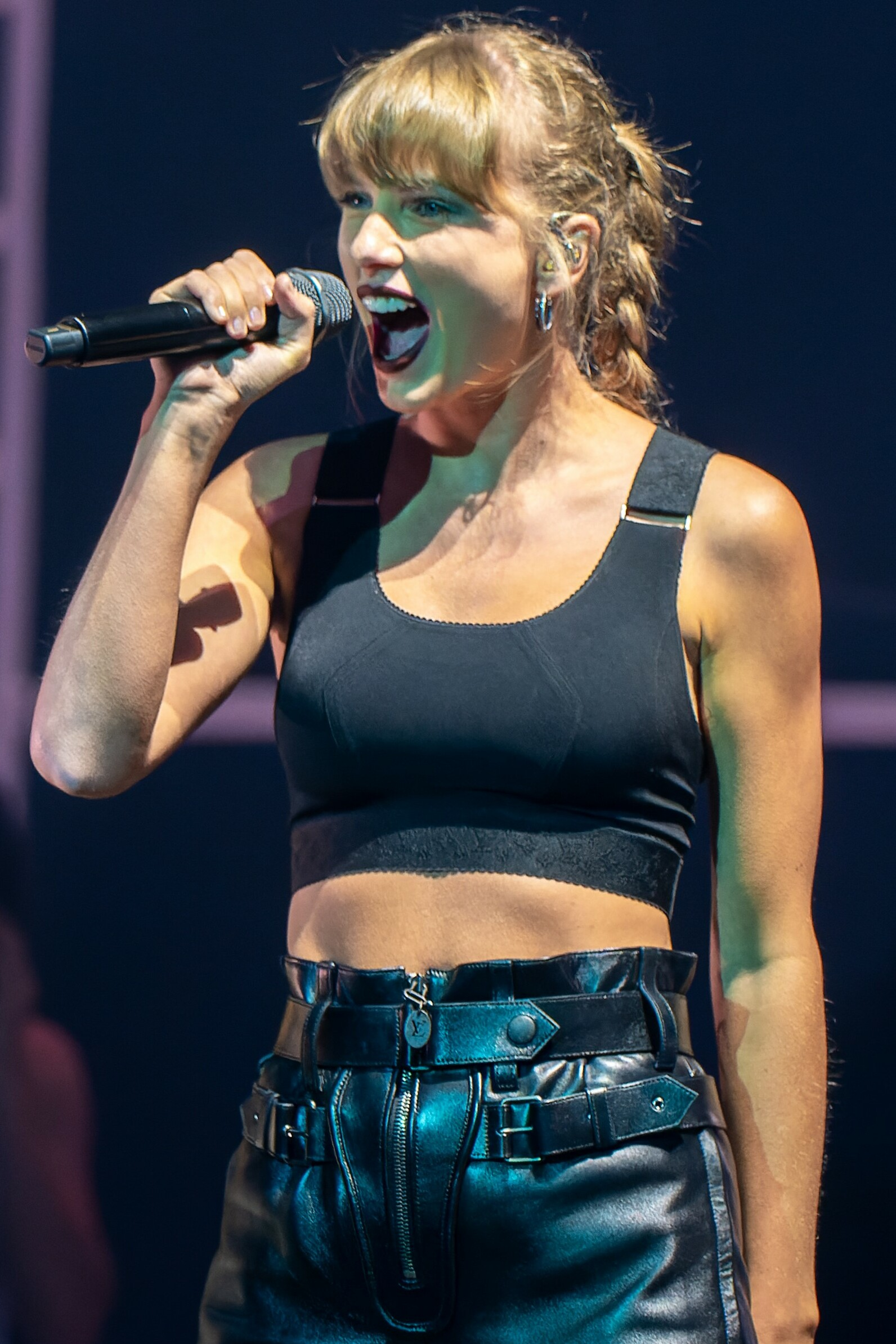
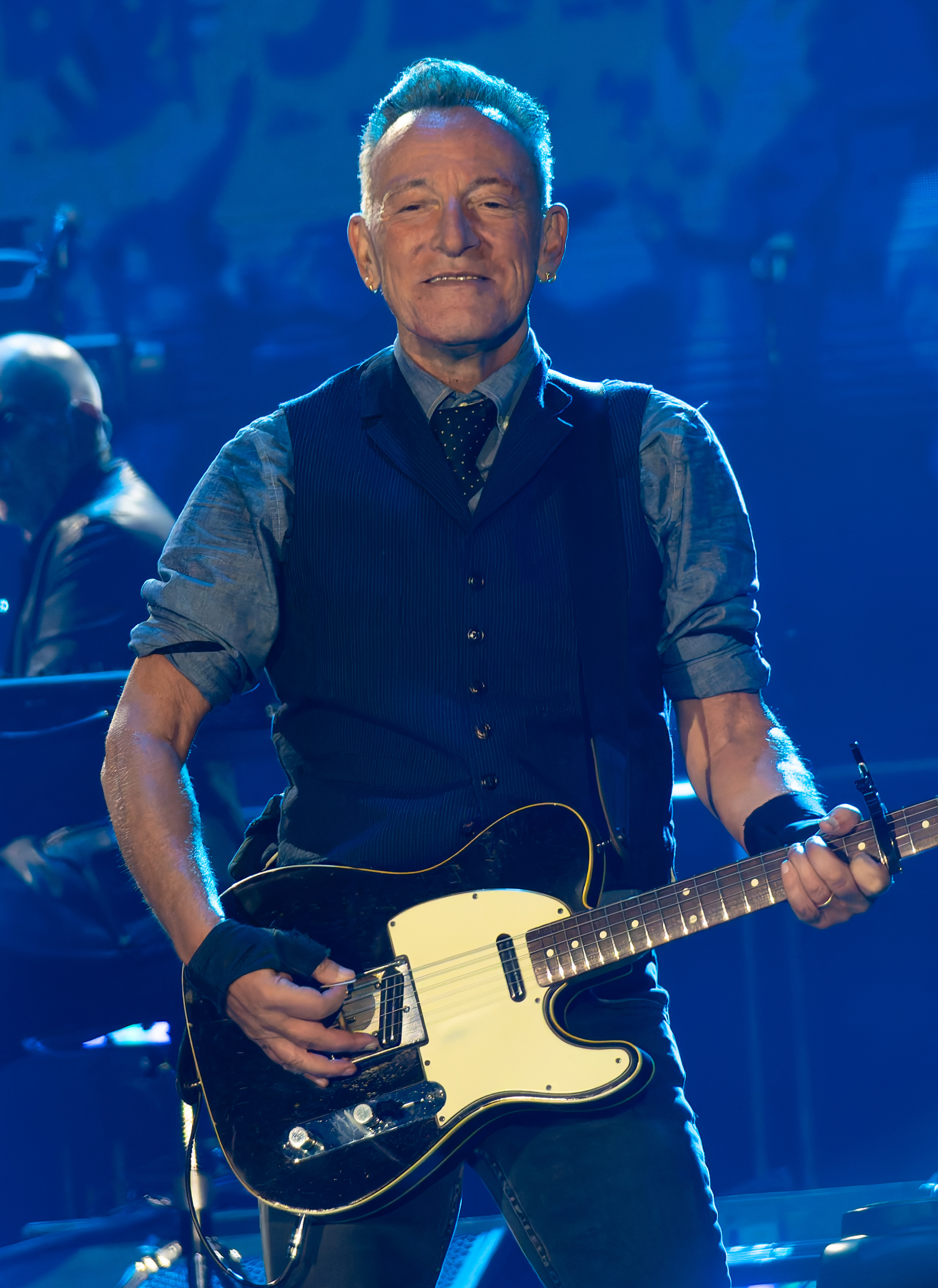
Numerous reviewers compared the sound of "American Teenager" to various musicians, especially Taylor Swift (left) and Bruce Springsteen (right).

Numerous reviewers compared the sound of "American Teenager" to various musicians, especially Taylor Swift and Bruce Springsteen. The Guardian's Shaad D'Souza said the track "feels indebted" to Swift and Springsteen and jokingly called it "the year's best Taylor Swift song". Similarly, Michelle Hyun Kim of Rolling Stone said it is reminiscent of Springsteen, Swift, and the emo band American Football. Devon Chodzin from Paste commented on the track's "Springsteen-like curiosity around Americana, but even more biting criticism". Tom Williams noticed similarities with Swift's second studio album, Fearless (2008), in a review for Beats Per Minute. Similarly, Evan Rytlewski of Pitchfork observed similarities between the song and Speak Now (2010), Swift's third studio album. Steve Erickson from Slant Magazine wrote that the song's "huge drums and vocals drowned in reverb" could be played next to Swift's songs on Top 40 radio, while Reanna Cruz of NPR Music felt the song's guitar tones were inspired by Swift and the musician Tom Petty. Paper's Jacqueline Codiga highlighted similarities between "American Teenager" and Swift's 2008 song "Love Story", while Rayne Fisher-Quann of i-D commented on the song's "Springsteen-inflected heartland rock". Writing for Business Insider, Callie Ahlgrim felt that the song "scratches a similar itch" that Lana Del Rey's song "Born to Die" (2012) did, "but swaps [Del Rey's] heavy-handed nihilism for a snapshot of youth that's far more complex and authentic". A writer for Billboard felt the "ethereal regions of [Cain's] voice" were reminiscent of the Irish rock band the Cranberries. In an interview with Paper, Cain cited Springsteen as a longtime inspiration.

== Reception ==
=== Critical response ===
Upon its release, "American Teenager" received positive reviews from music publications. Several critics considered it a standout track from Preacher's Daughter. (Note: Attributed to The Guardian's Phil Mongredien, Paste's Scott Russell, American Songwriter's Em Casalena, Clash's Oshen Douglas-McCormick, and British GQ's Lucy Ford and Jessie Atkinson.) Some reviewers highlighted the emotional contrast between the upbeat production and the melancholic lyrics. Rytlewski commended the song's ability to effectively establish the album's recurring themes. Some critics applauded the song's lyrical complexity, emotional depth, and imagery. (Note: Attributed to The Line of Best Fit's Paul Bridgewater, The Guardian's Shaad D'Souza, and Paste's Jacqueline Codiga.) DIY's Ben Tipple considered it "perfect epic pop", while Bridgewater felt it was one of the album's "tent-pole tracks". Critics enjoyed the song's blend of genres and Cain's ability to make an accessible track while maintaining a distinct sound.

==== Rankings ====
Several publications deemed "American Teenager" one of the best songs of 2022. It appeared in the top 25 spots in lists from Business Insider, The Line of Best Fit, the Los Angeles Times, Vulture, The Guardian, Slant Magazine, Pitchfork, Paste, The New York Times, DIY, Billboard, and NPR Music. It also received further placements in the top 100 from The Fader, Consequence, Vice, and Rolling Stone, and appeared in unranked lists from Slate, Nylon, Uproxx, and British GQ. It was included in Rolling Stone's 2023 list of the most inspirational LGBTQ songs of all time; Ilana Kaplan called it Preacher's Daughter's breakout song. Similarly, Billboard named it as one of the best LGBTQ anthems of all time in 2024, describing it as "earnest yet jaded, familiar yet fresh".

Pitchfork and Paste both featured the song in their mid-decade lists of the best songs of the 2020s. The former ranked it at number 29; Horn called it a "fist-pumping anthem of solidarity for all the young people that the American dream leaves behind". The latter named it the 64th best track, with Clare Martin lauding Cain's pop abilities "as she pays tribute to her Southern Baptist Florida upbringing". In 2024, American Songwriter named it the best rock song of the decade so far; Em Casalena lauded the song's folk elements, saying they made the song sound "addicting". She also commented, "It's wild how a song about intergenerational trauma can be such a delightful little slice of music". Both USA Today and Billboard included it in their 2024 lists of the best songs to play on the Fourth of July.

Select rankings of "American Teenager"
Publication	List	Year	Rank	Ref.
Billboard	The 100 Best Songs of 2022	2022	21	
Billboard	70 Top LGBTQ+ Anthems of All Time	2024	46	
DIY	Tracks of 2022	2022	20	
The Guardian	The 20 Best Songs of 2022	2022	8	
The Line of Best Fit	The Best Songs of 2022	2022	2	
Los Angeles Times	50 Best Songs of 2022	2022	3	
The New York Times	Best Songs of 2022	2022	13	
NPR Music	100 Best Songs of 2022	2022	25	
Paste	Best Songs of 2022	2022	13	
Paste	The 100 Best Songs of the 2020s So Far	2024	64	
Pitchfork	The 100 Best Songs of 2022	2022	11	
Pitchfork	The 100 Best Songs of the 2020s So Far	2024	29	
Rolling Stone	100 Best Songs of 2022	2022	91	
Rolling Stone	The 50 Most Inspirational LGBTQ Songs of All Time	2023	49	

=== Celebrity response ===
"American Teenager" was listed as one of former President of the United States Barack Obama's favorite songs of 2022, which prompted surprise from Cain and the media due to the song's anti-war message. The song was included on the pre-show playlist for Swift's the Eras Tour (2023–2024). American singer-songwriter Gracie Abrams covered "American Teenager" at the Sydney concert of her Good Riddance Tour in January 2024. The following month, she recorded a cover version of the song for the Australian radio station Triple J. Following its release, Abrams showed admiration for Cain; she described the song as "amazing" and stated that she enjoys Cain's songwriting and listens to her music often.

=== Influence ===
Nico Lang named their nonfiction book, American Teenager: How Trans Kids Are Surviving Hate and Finding Joy in a Turbulent Era, after "American Teenager". They decided on the name when they heard Cain's song playing on the radio, later saying that they hoped the song would influence how readers approached their book.

== Music video and live performances ==
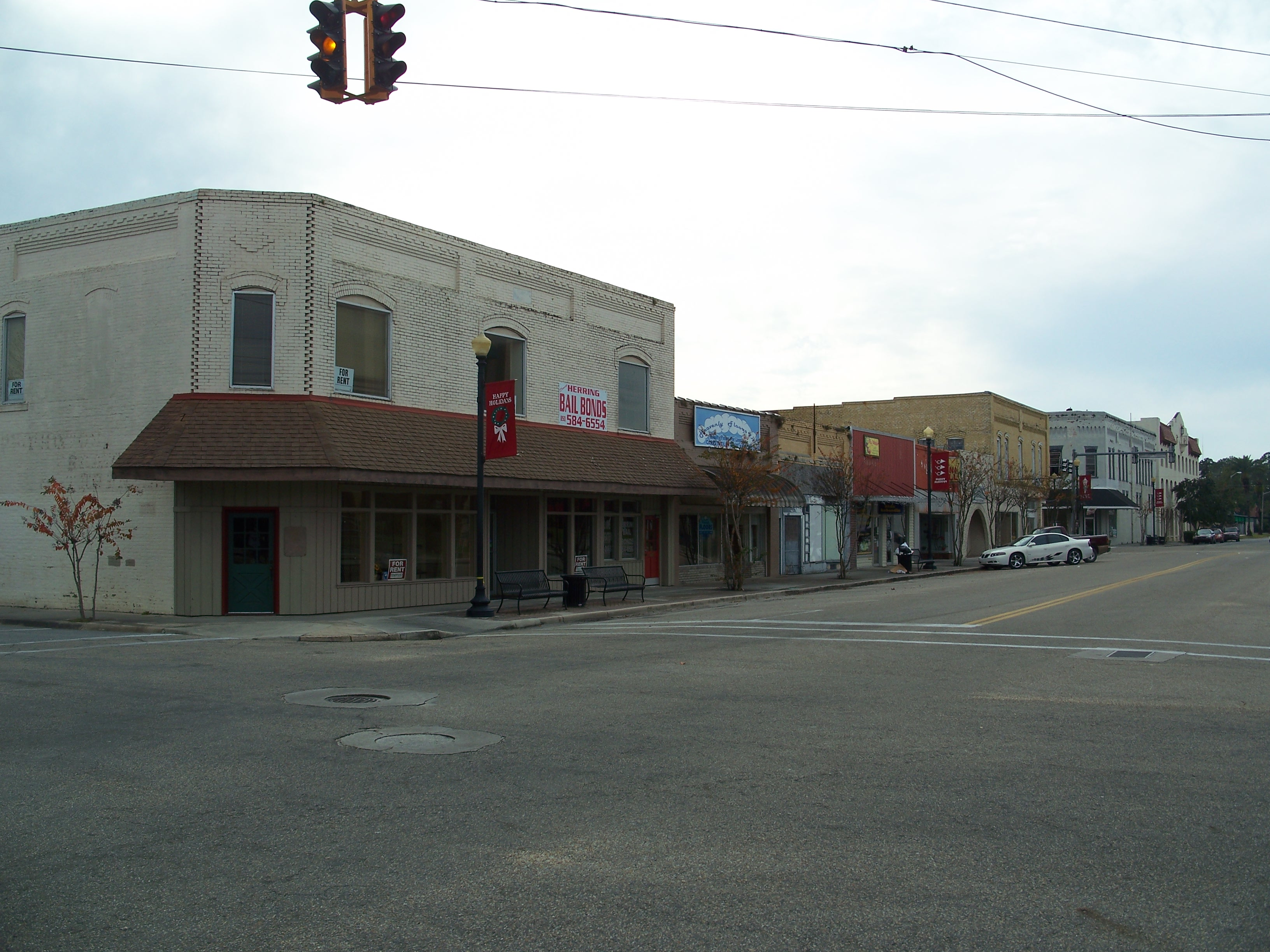
The music video for "American Teenager" was filmed in Cain's hometown of Perry, Florida.

Cain directed and edited the music video for "American Teenager", which was filmed by Silken Weinberg in Cain's hometown of Perry, Florida. Cain wore her mother's cheerleading uniform to the city's high school football field, shooting the video on the same camera used for the music video of her song "God's Country" (2021). She stated that she felt it correct to follow in her mother's "footsteps" for the music video after looking at old pictures of her mother. The video pays homage to American Football and contains footage of the September 11 attacks. It also includes a longer intro to the song.

Cain performed "American Teenager" live at several festivals, including the Pitchfork Music Festival, Coachella, and Primavera Sound. She also included it in the set list of her first two concerts tours, the Freezer Bride Tour in 2022, and the Blood Stained Blonde Tour in 2023.

== Certifications ==
Region	Certification	Certified units/sales
United States (RIAA)	Gold	500,000^{‡}
^{‡} Sales+streaming figures based on certification alone.
