= Matthew Williams (designer) =

American designer, creative and entrepreneur

Matthew M. Williams
- Born: October 17, 1985 (age 40); Evanston, Illinois, US
- Title: Creative director of 1017 ALYX 9SM
- Spouse: Jennifer Murray (m. 2013; div. 2020)
- Children: 3

Matthew M. "Dada" Williams is an American designer, creative, and entrepreneur. The co-founder of the fashion brand 1017 ALYX 9SM, he was creative director of Givenchy women's and men's collections from June 2020 to January 1, 2024.

== Early life ==
Williams was born on October 17, 1985, in Evanston, Illinois. His parents worked in the medical field. When he was two years old, the family moved to Pismo Beach, California, where he grew up. As a child, he wanted to become an emergency room doctor. As a teen, he became interested in skateboard culture soccer and music, and would drive to Santa Barbara and Los Angeles to attend concerts and DJ sets. At 18, during an internship with a soccer coach who also owned a clothing brand, Williams realized that fashion could be a career. Williams took one semester of art classes at the University of California but never pursued any formal fashion training.

== Career ==
=== Art direction ===
Despite being rejected from Parsons School of Design, Williams landed a job as a production manager and began to learn the business of running a clothing label before discovering costume design through music stylists.

In 2007, Kanye West's stylist asked Williams to design a jacket for his Grammy Awards performance with Daft Punk. Williams helped design a jacket with embedded LEDs. Impressed by the 21-year-old designer's creativity, West asked Williams to join his team. Williams eventually moved from costume design for West to art directing videos and setting up the studio for West's first fashion brand, Pastelle, as well as his creative content company, DONDA.

In 2012, ties with West led to the formation of the art and DJing collective Been Trill — made up of Heron Preston, Virgil Abloh, Justin Saunders and Williams, who describes it as "really just a fun thing to do."

A chance encounter with Lady Gaga in a sushi restaurant led to a steadfast friendship and an intense creative collaboration. Nicknamed "Dada" by Gaga's fans when he was the first artistic director of the "Haus of Gaga" (2008 to 2010), Williams went on to create much-noted costumes for the singer as she attained international stardom.

=== 1017 Alyx 9SM ===
Originally called ALYX, the brand was started by Matthew, Jennifer-his then wife, and Luca Benini in 2015. Jennifer Murray, Matthew's ex-wife, managed global sales for the brand until stopping in 2019. For Fall-Winter 2015, they debuted Alyx a women's wear brand named after their eldest daughter, a project to express their views.

=== 1017 Alyx 9SM – Collaborations ===
Through his label 1017 Alyx 9SM, Williams soon began collaborating with international brands including Dior, Nike, Moncler, Bang & Olufsen, and Mackintosh.

==== Dior ====
At Dior, Kim Jones, the artistic director for men's wear, invited Williams to collaborate on accessories for the Spring-Summer 2019 collection. Williams brought his brutalist industrial aesthetic to selected pieces through a utility buckle inspired by a rollercoaster ride at Six Flags amusement park. On the men's wear runway, the buckle cropped up on belts, caps and backpacks.

==== Nike ====
In January 2020 Matthew Williams' collection for Nike was released:

==== Moncler ====
In February 2020, 1017 ALYX 9SM teamed up with Moncler for its Genius lines.

==== Louisahhh ====
In November 2021, 1017 ALYX 9SM teamed up with the Paris-based DJ Louisahhh to design a t-shirt to promote Louisahhh's new album, The Practice of Freedom.

==== XIN ====
In March 2021, XIN announced a collaboration with 1017 ALYX 9SM.

==== Givenchy ====
In June 2020, Williams was appointed Creative Director of Givenchy collections for women and men, launching his first collection in December 2020. In November 2023, Williams' departure from Givenchy at the end of the year was announced.

Matthew M Williams

On June 2, 2025, Williams announced the formation of a new namesake fashion line, slated to debut at Paris Fashion Week later that month.

==== Oakley ====
In March 2026, Williams joined Oakley as Creative Director of Apparel, Footwear, and Accessories.

== Personal life ==
Williams was married to Jennifer Murray. They have two daughters, Alyx and Valetta. He has a son, Cairo, from a previous relationship with costume designer Erin Hirsh. He was also previously in a relationship with Lady Gaga.
