= Gibson Girl (song) =

2022 single by Ethel Cain

Single by Ethel Cain

from the album Preacher's Daughter
- Released: March 17, 2022
- Length: 5:42
- Label: Daughters of Cain
- Songwriter: Hayden Silas Anhedönia
- Producer: Ethel Cain

Ethel Cain singles chronology
"Crush" (2021)	"Gibson Girl" (2022)	"Strangers" (2022)

Audio video
- "Gibson Girl" on YouTube

"Gibson Girl" is a song written, produced, and recorded by American singer-songwriter and record producer Ethel Cain for her debut studio album, Preacher's Daughter (2022). It was released on March 17, 2022, as the album's lead single.

A sexy and suspenseful song, it explores "fresh aspects of femme energy". "Gibson Girl" was included on the set list of The Freezer Bride Tour (2022) and the Blood Stained Blonde Tour (2023), her first and second concert tours as a headliner, respectively.

== Background and composition ==
Alongside the release of "Gibson Girl", on March 17, 2022, the singer announced her debut studio album, Preacher's Daughter, which was stated to release on May 12. Lyrically, the song "deals with being under the microscope and how patriarchal systems can lead to issues of self-worth".

In a press release about the song, Cain said:

"Being a woman is about never quite reaching a goal that someone else set for you. Under pressure to fit an impossible standard, I find myself daydreaming about what it would be like to be perfect in a way I can't ever possibly achieve. I've always been in love with Evelyn Nesbit, the Gibson Girl, and thought she was the absolute pinnacle of feminine poise and grace. Whenever I start to lose myself and forget what I'm capable of, I just turn to her and she's the greatest reminder"

== Critical reception ==
The song was described by Flood Magazine as "sexy and suspenseful". Cain's vocals in "Gibson Girl" were compared to those of alternative pop singer Banks, "but with a more sinister tone akin to Miguel".
