= Strangers (Ethel Cain song) =

2022 single by Ethel Cain

Single by Ethel Cain

from the album Preacher's Daughter
- Released: April 7, 2022
- Length: 5:44
- Label: Daughters of Cain
- Songwriter: Hayden Silas Anhedönia
- Producer: Ethel Cain

Ethel Cain singles chronology
| "Gibson Girl" (2022) | "Strangers" (2022) | "American Teenager" (2022) |

Audio video
- "Strangers" on YouTube

"Strangers" is a song written, produced, and recorded by American singer-songwriter Ethel Cain for her debut studio album, Preacher's Daughter (2022). The last track on the record, it was released as its second single through her own record label, Daughters of Cain, on April 7, 2022. Influenced by grunge, it received praise from music critics for its affecting lines and hair rock guitar solo. On "Strangers", she follows the narrative of the concept album centered on fictional characters and concludes it with a “cannibalistic climax”.

== Background and release ==
On March 17, 2022, Ethel Cain announced her debut studio album titled Preacher's Daughter, along with the release of the first single "Gibson Girl". She also shared its track listing, in which "Strangers" appears as the last song. On April 7, 2022, Cain released it as the second single from the album.

== Composition ==
With a "cannibalistic climax", it contains "haunting pianos", grunge guitars and "muddy sounds". The song was described by The Line of Best Fit's Tom Williams as "unbearably sad" and "is built across some of the record's most affecting lines" ("When my mother sees me on the side / Of a milk carton in Winn-Dixie's dairy aisle / She'll cry and wait up for me"). In the narrative of the album, in the song the character is a "freezer bride" in her killer's basement and being cannibalised as she sends out one final message of love to her mother. The song ends with a hair rock guitar solo. Following its release, Cain stated that "Strangers" was written in "about 10 minutes" and is her favorite song she has written at the time. She also said that it was the second song that she wrote for the record, "without the intention that it would become the ending". About that topic, Cain continued:

Looking back, I can't imagine a more perfect resolution to this lineage. I think subconsciously, this song was always the end of the road. It's the realization that some things cannot be avoided, only accepted, and that just because it isn't a happy ending, doesn't mean it's a bad one. There is an ending in every beginning, and all things come back around in one strange way or another. You can't change your past, nor anyone else's, and the only real strength you have in this lifetime is your forgiveness.

== Usage in media ==
The song was featured in the 2024 romance film It Ends with Us and its trailer, starring Blake Lively and Justin Baldoni.
