= Preacher's Daughter =

Studio album by Ethel Cain
- Released: May 12, 2022
- Genres: Americana; dark ambient; roots rock
- Length: 75:42
- Label: Daughters of Cain (via AWAL)
- Producers: Ethel Cain; Matthew Tomasi

Ethel Cain chronology
Inbred (2021)	Preacher's Daughter (2022)	Perverts (2025)

Singles from Preacher's Daughter
- 1. "Gibson Girl" Released: March 17, 2022; 2. "Strangers" Released: April 7, 2022; 3. "American Teenager" Released: April 21, 2022

Preacher's Daughter is the debut studio album by the American singer-songwriter and record producer Ethel Cain. It was released on May 12, 2022, through her independent record label Daughters of Cain. The album was entirely written and produced by Cain, with assistance from Steven Mark Colyer and Matthew Tomasi on certain tracks.

Preacher's Daughter is a concept album with a narrative that centers on fictional characters, exploring themes such as family trauma and sexual violence. It was inspired by the artist's personal life as the daughter of a deacon. Sonically, it experiments with Americana, dark ambient, roots rock, and elements of several other genres. Cain openly shared that she was inspired by the artist Florence Welch throughout her music career and her vocal performance on the album. Fans suggested that she and Lana Del Rey share similar visual aesthetic and music production, along with similar Americana themes told through flawed female characters; with Cain having the raw and violent Americana and Del Rey having the glamorized and romanticized gothic Americana. Cain's work incorporates predominant Southern Gothic imagery with religious and American aesthetics. Three singles—"Gibson Girl", "Strangers", and "American Teenager"—preceded Preacher's Daughter between March and April 2022, the latter accompanied by a music video. To promote the album, Cain embarked on her first two concert tours, the Freezer Bride Tour in 2022 and the Blood Stained Blonde Tour in 2023, through North America, Europe, and Oceania.

Upon its release, Preacher's Daughter was met with acclaim from music critics, with praise towards its storytelling and songwriting, and Cain's vocal performance. Many critics named it one of the best albums of the year, while Paste included it on a mid-decade ranking. A standout for reviewers, "American Teenager" was deemed by Billboard and Rolling Stone one of the best LGBTQ songs of all time. The album has also garnered Cain a cult following online. Following its release via physical formats in April 2025, it reached the top-10 on the record charts of Australia, the Netherlands, the United Kingdom, and the United States. Preacher's Daughter is the first part of a trilogy of albums, which Cain intends to portray through a series of novels and an accompanying film. A prequel to the album, Willoughby Tucker, I'll Always Love You, was released in August 2025.

== Background and development ==
Hayden Silas Anhedönia developed an interest in music at a young age. She was involved in a church choir from a Southern Baptist community where her father was a deacon; it was her first exposure to music. Influenced by a variety of Christian music, she began studying classical piano at age 8. She left the church at the age of 16. Two years later, after leaving her religious family home in Florida, she began her gender transition process and started writing her debut studio album.

In 2017, she released bedroom pop demos of songs under different monikers. As White Silas, she first published Gregorian chant-inspired singles and mixtapes to SoundCloud and Tumblr. Two years later, she began her main project, Ethel Cain, with the extended plays (EPs) Carpet Bed and Golden Age. She then signed to the publishing company Prescription Songs, and created her own imprint Daughters of Cain.

Cain's debut album had an initial duration of two hours and a half. Before the idea of Preacher's Daughter, Cain was working on a different concept album "about angels and stuff"; she stated that she was under "LSD psychosis withdrawals" at the time. She changed the course of the album when she found a piano sample that inspired her to write the song "A House in Nebraska" in one day. Cain first opted for an album about "prairie women", inspired by her vision of a woman in a field that recalled her to Little House on the Prairie, and envisioned the album's protagonist as a cult leader. "Strangers" was then written in 10 minutes, without the intention for it to become the album's final track. She declared that "a week or two" after watching the 1991 film Thelma & Louise, she wrote "Thoroughfare" and the album "shifted into a new gear", and was inspired to see "where [the story] was truly going". She also listened to horror podcasts and spent time at country stores and estate sales while making the record.

Cain gained prominence in 2021 by releasing her third EP under the moniker, Inbred. The EP marked a departure from Cain's previous bedroom production and served as a teaser of how her full-length debut would sound. Developed over four years, Cain wrote and produced all 13 tracks on Preacher's Daughter, with assistance from two collaborators: the multi-instrumentalist Matthew Tomasi and the musician Steven Mark Colyer.

== Concept and themes ==
=== Overview ===
Preacher's Daughter is a concept album inspired by Cain's own struggles with culture and religion, but centered on the fictional character of the same name, a girl who suffered abuse from her father and escapes from her Christian family and community. The artist stated that the character is her alter ego, and described it as her "dark, evil twin". The overall lyrical themes of the album include transgenerational trauma, toxic relationships, and cultist Christianity, and some of the content is a criticism to the "American Dream". The story of the album is set in the southern United States in 1991, ten years after the death of the town's preacher, the main character's father. Writing for Vox, Emily St. James found the album's characterization similar to Truman Capote's 1966 novel In Cold Blood and the works of Flannery O'Connor.

Cain has stated that Preacher's Daughter was the first chapter of the story, with an intention to write a series of novels, as well as directing and starring in an accompanying film. In an interview with The Line of Best Fit in December 2022, she also expressed interest in continuing a trilogy of albums, with the second and third titled Preacher’s Wife and Mother of a Preacher, respectively. She dubbed the trilogy "the Ethel Cain Cinematic Universe". A prequel to Preacher's Daughter, titled Willoughby Tucker, I'll Always Love You, was released in August 2025. Originally described as a companion EP, it eventually became Cain's second studio album.

=== Songs ===
On the album's prologue, titled "Family Tree" and subtitled "(Intro)", Cain explores transgenerational trauma. It begins with a distorted recording of a Southern preacher explaining the significance of the mother as an icon. The intro is followed by "American Teenager", on which the artist is critical to the "American Dream", expresses anti-war themes, and criticizes gun culture in the United States. On the torch song "A House in Nebraska", Cain relays the story of herself and a partner's lives, named Willoughby, while missing them and their home base in Nebraska. A second partner is portrayed as a crime-committing bad boy on "Western Nights", which romanticizes their dark and abusive relationship and how she would do anything for them. Beats Per Minute's Tom Williams drew comparisons between the lyrics of "Western Nights" and Lana Del Rey's Ultraviolence (2014).

The lyrics of the fifth track, "Family Tree", are about her relationship with Christianity and a complicated family network marked by violence. On "Hard Times", Cain longs for the love of a distant father who perpetuated sexual abuse to her, and pleads him, "Tell me a story about how it ends, where you're still the good guy. I'll make pretend". She also reflects about wanting to "emulate the fatherly authorities in her life who brought her harm", according to Devon Chodzin from Paste. The seventh track, "Thoroughfare", finds Cain meeting a man in Texas, who tells her not to escape from his truck. The protagonist "hop[s] right in" as they go towards the west of the United States, while she affirms: "'Cause for the first time since I was a child/I could see a man who wasn't angry." "Gibson Girl" is a violent song told from the perspective of a Ethel Cain's eventual development as a prostitute. On the track, she narrates a situation of abuse from her new partner, detailing how sexuality on the album often directly proximate to violence and death.

On "Ptolemaea", Cain goes through hallucinations induced by drugs. While a distorted male voice says "gave you, need you, love you"; the character begs to "stop". It was influenced by the artist's love for horror movies. The song was named after one of four concentric rings of the ninth circle of Hell in Dante's Inferno, dedicated to those who betrayed their guests. "Ptolemaea" is followed by two instrumental tracks—"August Underground" and "Televangelism". The former represents Cain trying to escape from her lover, who ultimately kills her, and the latter allegorizes her ascent to Heaven. "Sun Bleached Flies", the penultimate song on Preacher's Daughter, finds the character reflecting from beyond the grave; she later recalls the third track: "I'm still praying for that house in Nebraska." She looks back lamenting her detachment from faith and her community. The final track on the album, "Strangers", starts with another monologue from the preacher, who talks about the paradise awaiting believers after death. The track sees Cain as a "freezer bride" in her killer's basement, who cannibalizes her. She tries to have validation from her lover and religion, and then focuses on her mother in the final verse of the song and album: "Mama, just know that I love you / And I'll see you when you get here".

== Music and style ==
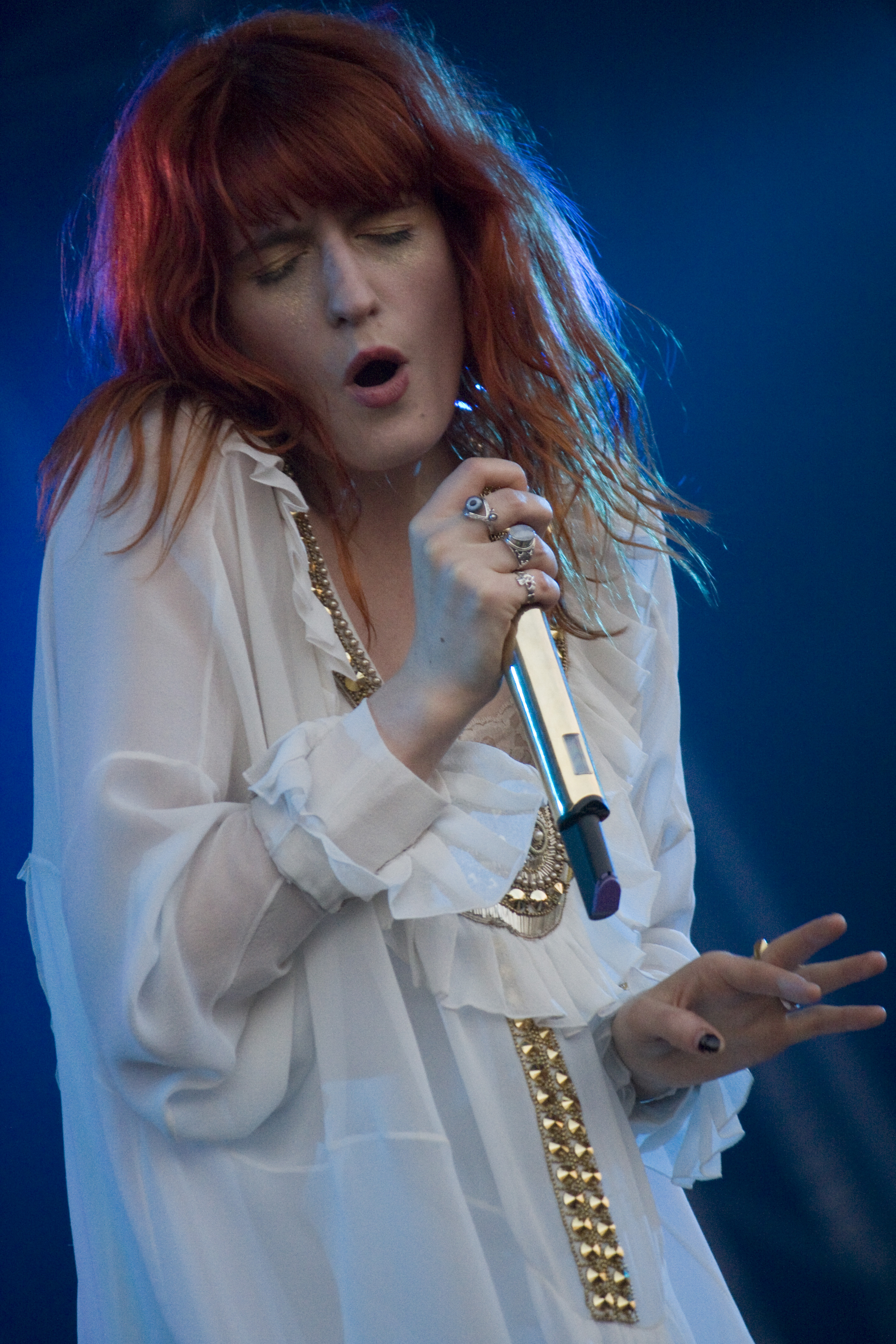
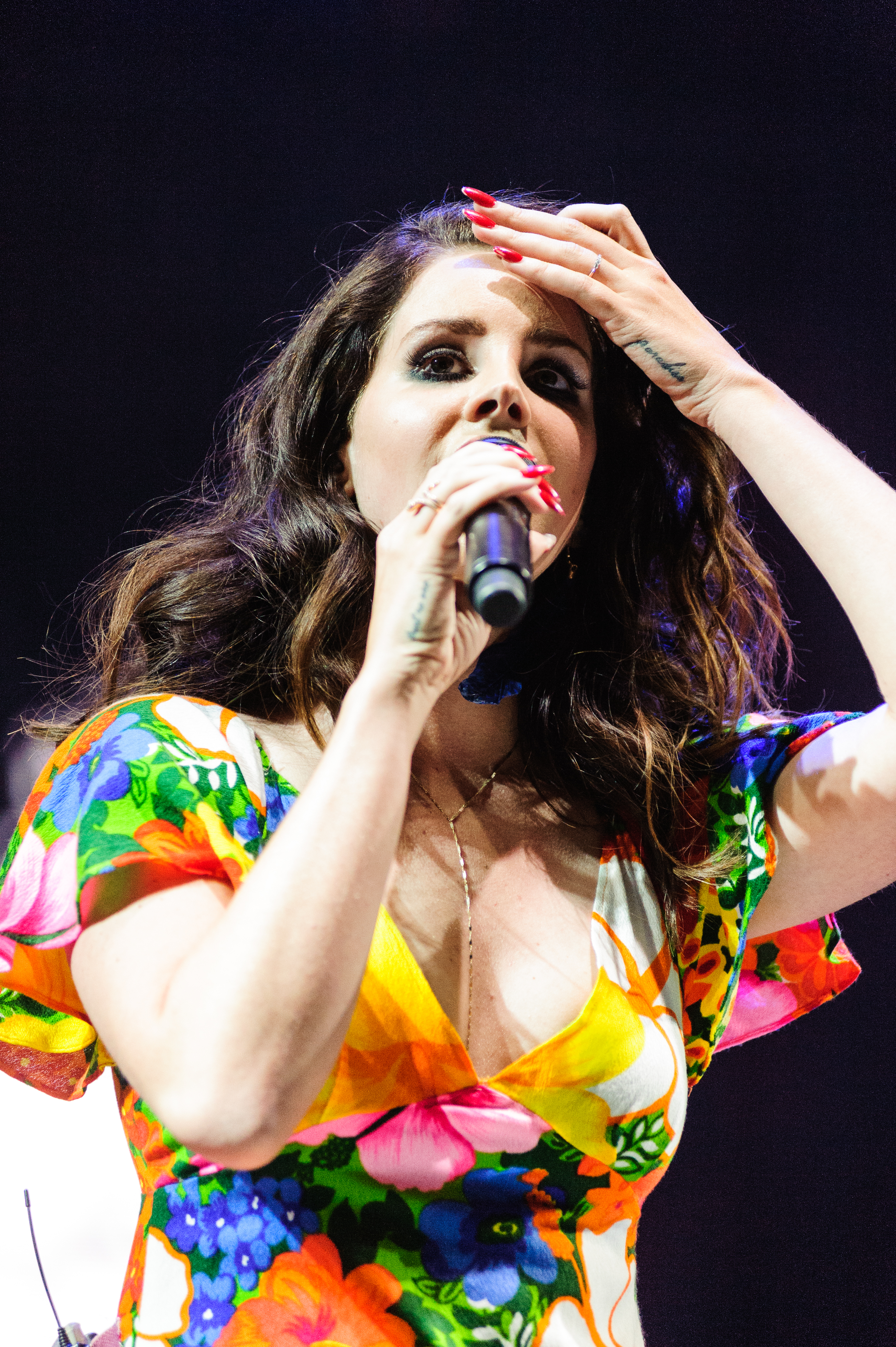
Cain cited Florence Welch and Lana Del Rey as mainstream inspirations for her vocal performance.

Preacher's Daughter was described variously by critics as an Americana, dark ambient, and roots rock album with perceived influences from slowcore, heartland rock, gospel, industrial, noise, and horror-electronica. The album's sound is built around piano, grunge guitars, and "muddy sounds". Several of its tracks are power ballads, while the majority of them introduce guitar solos, mainly inspired by stadium rock and hair rock. The album contains cock rock riffs, sludge and drone instrumentals, and draws inspiration from Gregorian chants and choral vocals. Cain cited mainstream artists Florence Welch and Lana Del Rey as vocal inspirations. Many music critics observed similarities between Preacher's Daughter and the music of Del Rey, (Note: Attributed to Paste's Devon Chodzin, Pitchfork's Evan Rytlewski, and American Songwriter's Em Casalena.) while Shaad D'Souza for The Guardian also added Grouper to the comparisons.

"Thoroughfare"
"Thoroughfare" is the centerpiece of Preacher's Daughter; it is a country-inspired epic driven by a harmonica, an acoustic guitar, and reverberated drums.

The dark and heavy production of "Family Tree", subtitled "(Intro)", contrasts with the energetic first half of the album. The most upbeat track on the album, "American Teenager", is led by synthesizers and guitars. Self-described by Cain as a "fake pop song", reviewers compared its sound to the works of several musicians, including Khalid, Taylor Swift, and Bruce Springsteen. "A House in Nebraska" is built over piano chords and includes a maximalist crescendo with electric guitars and drums, which Caitlin White of Uproxx believed it was close to shoegaze. Cain then explores with pop rock on "Western Nights". Less pop elements are present on the album as it progresses. The tracks "Family Tree" and "Gibson Girl" incorporate distorted white noise and piano; Meaghan Garvey from NPR described the latter as "hate-f*** R&B" and compared its production to a "strip club death march". The album's centerpiece, "Thoroughfare", is a country-inspired track led by harmonica and acoustic guitar; it is structured as an epic. The track is also built around reverberated drums and intensified vocals; it concludes with a sequence led by tambourines and scat singing. The longest song on the album, it is one of the tracks that lean more towards a roots-inspired sound along with "Hard Times", according to Rytlewski. The critic compared Cain's clear vocal performance on these songs to the style of Natalie Merchant. With buzzing flies as its background, "Ptolemaea" draws from industrial, metal, and "harder rock", according to White. The instrumental track "Televangelism" features echoed piano, which according to Chodzin, recalls Grouper's Grid of Points (2018). The closer tracks on Preacher's Daughter, "Sun Bleached Flies" and "Strangers", add elements of country and rock.

== Artwork and aesthetics ==
Preacher's Daughter has predominant Southern Gothic imagery. Cain's on-stage performances for the album were inspired by Edwardian fashion and Americana style. The cover artwork of the album depicts Cain sitting below a painting of Jesus Christ, wearing a vintage white dress and heels. In an interview with Nylon, Cain stated that she wanted the cover to be "a little creepy, like an eerie photograph found under your grandmother's bed of a relative she never told you about". She also revealed that it took "about 8 selects", but chose the one where "[her] face was morphed slightly". Promotional visuals for tracks from the album feature grainy shots of empty cabins and churches with American flags, with lights turned on, ceiling fans running, and crucifixes on wood-panelled walls.

== Promotion and release ==
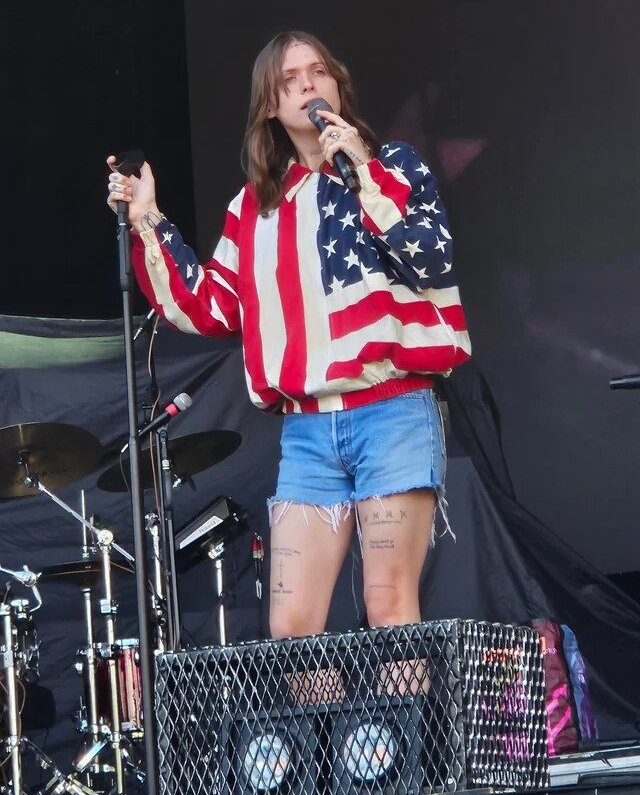
Cain performing at Gunnersbury Park for her concert tour Blood Stained Blonde Tour (2023)

Cain announced that her debut album would be titled Preacher's Daughter on March 17, 2022, and revealed its release date. Alongside the album's announcement, Cain shared its track listing via social media. She also released the lead single of the album, "Gibson Girl". The following month, "Strangers" and "American Teenager" were released as the second and third single respectively; the latter gained an accompanying video in July. Preacher's Daughter was self-released on May 12, 2022, through Daughters of Cain. It has since gained a cult following online. The album was initially slated to be issued physically for the first time on January 17, 2025, through a vinyl LP format; the release was then delayed for April 4.

To promote the album, Cain hosted album release shows in Los Angeles and New York City, on May 18 and May 25, 2022, respectively. She also performed live on KEXP, and at WNXP's Sonic Cathedral in Nashville, Tennessee. As part of Vevo's "DSCVR Artists to Watch 2023" series, the singer recorded live performances for "A House in Nebraska" and "Thoroughfare".

In June 2022, Cain confirmed via social media that she would be embarking on her first concert tour across the United States, titled the Freezer Bride Tour. Weeks later, she announced several dates across Europe, in the United Kingdom, Germany, Netherlands, and France. She also embarked on the Blood Stained Blonde Tour in 2023, which marked her Coachella Festival debut. Cain performed at other festivals such as Pitchfork Music Festival, Vivid Sydney, and Reading and Leeds Festivals, and served as a supporting act for Florence and the Machine's Dance Fever Tour, Caroline Polachek's Spiraling Tour, and Boygenius's The Tour.

== Critical reception ==
Professional ratings
Aggregate scores
Source	Rating
AnyDecentMusic?	8.2/10
Metacritic	82/100
Review scores
Source	Rating
AllMusic	4/5 stars
Beats Per Minute	80%
Clash	9/10
Crack	9/10
DIY	5/5 stars
The Guardian	3/5 stars
The Line of Best Fit	9/10
Paste	9.0/10
Pitchfork	6.4/10
Sputnikmusic	5/5 stars

Music publications reported that Preacher's Daughter received critical acclaim upon its release. (Note: Attributed to V's Julia Koscelnik, Billboard's Stephen Daw, American Songwriter's Em Casalena, and British GQ's Josiah Gogarty.) The album holds a score of 82 out of 100 based on eight reviews from the media aggregate site Metacritic, indicating "universal acclaim". The review aggregator site AnyDecentMusic? gave the album a score of 8.2 out of 10, based on their assessment of the critical consensus from 12 reviews.

Several critics praised Cain's vocal performance on the album. Writing for Clash, Oshen Douglas McCormick described it as "prodigious" and said that it demands an emotional reception from the listener. Garland and Chodzin opined that it is broad in range, while the former also commended her songwriting. The Guardian's Rachel Aroesti also praised the album for its lyrical content and "atmospheric potency". Sputnikmusic's Jesper L. admired the storytelling and arrangements, and described the album as "an astonishing accomplishment". Similarly, Williams believed that the sound of Preacher's Daughter is as "heavy and unsettling" as its lyrical content and aesthetics.

McCormick wrote that Cain's musical journey reached "a new height" with Preacher's Daughter, and described it as "a truly realised culmination of style and composition". Paul Bridgewater from The Line of Best Fit praised the album's as cohesive and compared it positively to other debut projects, later expressing an excitement for Cain's subsequent career.

Less favorably, Pitchfork writer Evan Rytlewski noted a disconnect between the singer's "provocative public image and the rigid composure of [the] songs". He also criticized the album's length, believing that at times "she sounds like she's writing to run out the clock". Aroesti similarly thought that "by the end it's impossible to ignore the fact that this is a long record with flagging momentum".

=== Rankings ===
At the end of 2022, Preacher's Daughter was included on several publications' lists of the best albums of the year, being named the best by Crack, The Line of Best Fit, and Sputnikmusic. A standout according to critics, the track "American Teenager" was placed between the best LGBTQ songs of all time by Billboard and Rolling Stone, and was ranked at number 29 on Pitchfork's list of the best songs of the decade so far. In 2024, Paste ranked Preacher's Daughter at number 43 on "The 100 Best Albums of the 2020s So Far".

Select year-end rankings for Preacher's Daughter
Publication	List	Rank	Ref.
Albumism	The 100 Best Albums of 2022	6	
Billboard	Best Albums of 2022	46	
Clash	Clash Albums Of The Year 2022	4	
Crack	Best Albums of 2022	1	
Dazed	The 20 Best Albums of 2022	2	
The Guardian	The 50 Best Albums of 2022	23	
The Line of Best Fit	The Best Albums of 2022 Ranked	1	
Paste	The Best Albums of 2022	12	
The Ringer	The 33 Best Albums of 2022	11	
Slant Magazine	The 50 Best Albums of 2022	20	
Sputnikmusic	Staff's Top 50 Albums of 2022: 10 – 1	1	

Select mid-decade rankings for Preacher's Daughter
Publication	List	Rank	Ref.
Paste	The 100 Best Albums of the 2020s So Far	43	

== Commercial performance ==
Although a critical success, the album initially failed to chart. After years of gaining cult following, upon its 2025 vinyl release, Preacher's Daughter sold 37,000 copies between April 4 and April 10, 2025, leading to its debut at numbers ten and one on the Billboard 200 and Top Album Sales, respectively. This achievement made Cain the first openly transgender artist to earn a top 10 entry on the former chart.

== Track listing ==
All tracks written and produced by Ethel Cain, except where noted.

No.	Title	Writer(s)	Producer(s)	Length
1.	"Family Tree (Intro)"			3:41
2.	"American Teenager"	Ethel Cain; Steven Mark Colyer		4:18
3.	"A House in Nebraska"			7:46
4.	"Western Nights"			6:05
5.	"Family Tree"			7:11
6.	"Hard Times"			5:03
7.	"Thoroughfare"			9:28
8.	"Gibson Girl"			5:42
9.	"Ptolemaea"	Cain; Matthew Tomasi	Cain; Tomasi	6:24
10.	"August Underground"	Cain; Tomasi	Cain; Tomasi	3:40
11.	"Televangelism"			3:03
12.	"Sun Bleached Flies"			7:36
13.	"Strangers"			5:44
Total length:				75:42

== Charts ==
=== Weekly charts ===
Chart performance for Preacher's Daughter
Chart (2025–2026)	Peak position
Australian Albums (ARIA)	5
Austrian Albums (Ö3 Austria)	24
Belgian Albums (Ultratop Flanders)	11
Belgian Albums (Ultratop Wallonia)	63
Canadian Albums (Billboard)	64
Croatian International Albums (HDU)	18
Danish Albums (Hitlisten)	38
Dutch Albums (Album Top 100)	10
Finnish Albums (Suomen virallinen lista)	35
German Albums (Offizielle Top 100)	15
Irish Albums (IRMA)	52
New Zealand Albums (RMNZ)	11
Portuguese Albums (AFP)	49
Scottish Albums (Official Charts)	2
UK Albums (Official Charts)	10
UK Independent Albums (Official Charts)	2
US Billboard 200	10
US Independent Albums	2
US Top Alternative Albums (Billboard)	1
US Top Rock Albums (Billboard)	2

=== Year-end charts ===
2025 year-end chart performance for Preacher's Daughter
Chart (2025)	Position
US Top Rock & Alternative Albums (Billboard)	88

== Certifications ==
Certifications for Preacher's Daughter
Region	Certification	Certified units/sales
United Kingdom (BPI)	Silver	60,000^{‡}
^{‡} Sales+streaming figures based on certification alone.

== Release history ==
Release dates and formats for Preacher's Daughter
Region	Date	Format	Label	Ref.
Various	May 12, 2022	Digital download; streaming	Daughters of Cain	
Various	April 4, 2025	LP record	Daughters of Cain	
Various	August 7, 2026	CD	Daughters of Cain	
Various	September 18, 2026	Cassette	Daughters of Cain	
