= Poolside Chats =

- Title card
- Created by: Tom Green and Neil Hamburger
- Starring: Neil Hamburger
- Country of origin: United States
- No. of episodes: 6

Production
- Camera setup: Multiple-camera setup
- Running time: approx. 60 minutes

Original release
- Network: ManiaTV!
- Release: August 31, 2006 – January 15, 2007

Poolside Chats with Neil Hamburger was a live web series that aired on comedian Tom Green's now defunct internet TV channel.

== Description ==
Poolside Chats used to air live following Tom Green's House Tonight. The star of the show is self-described "America's Funnyman", Neil Hamburger. Neil took calls in which he usually traded insults with the callers. He has referred to some of his guests as "diseased degenerate rock and rollers." There was no real schedule for the show; it used to air randomly when there are suitable gaps in Hamburger's touring schedule. The show was also briefly available on an "On Demand" section of Tom Green's website.

== List of shows ==
| Date | Special guest(s) |
|---|---|
| 31 August 2006 | Buzz Osborne |
| 5 September 2006 | Pleaseeasaur (Main guest), Pool Guy Don |
| 27 September 2006 | Jack Grisham (Main guest), Jack's hairstylist (Jordan) |
| 24 October 2006 | Bonnie "Prince" Billy (Main guest), Andy Dick, Pool Guy Don |
| 8 November 2006 | Kyle Gass (Main guest), Steve-O, Pool Guy Don |
| 15 January 2007 | Tim Heidecker, Eric Wareheim |

== The format ==
Poolside Chats had a simple format. Filmed outside of Tom Green's house in the evenings, positioned by Green's outdoor pool, hence 'Poolside'. There was a small table where a telephone is positioned, from which Hamburger takes calls for his guest(s). Hamburger seated to the right of the table, and his guest(s) to the left.

Hamburger would take a mixture of questions he has thought of himself and questions from callers. The show operated without call screening, meaning anyone can call in and ask anything, serious or otherwise.

The show's affiliation with Tom Green (a notoriously confrontational prankster), coupled with its internet-only fanbase leads to the majority of the calls being pranks, insulting Hamburger or his guest(s), shouting racial slurs, or quoting internet memes. This led to Hamburger himself lashing out angrily against the callers (often without even being provoked), and hanging up or berating callers if they either did not respond quickly enough or gave signs they appeared to be setting up for a prank.

This haphazard format led to few actual questions of worth being asked, and normally relied on a torrent of genuine insults exchanged between callers and Hamburger for its comedic value.

== Problems with the show ==
In the episode of Tom Green Live before the first episode of Poolside Chats, Tom Green (out of frustration with a repeatedly failing phone system) smashed the thousand-dollar Pepper Pad portable computer supplied by ManiaTV!. In response, Mania TV cut off the live feed, changing it to Mania TV's feed so viewers saw its programming instead of Poolside Chats.

Poolside Chats carried on unknowingly, until callers informed Hamburger that the feed had been changed (the first few minutes of the show aired before the feed was changed). This led to angry callers demanding the feed to be fixed, Hamburger greeting callers with 'You're not on the air!' and 'Poolside SHIT with Neil Hamburger' (phrases that would be used again in future episodes), and bemused conversations between Hamburger, guest King Buzzo and Tom Green.

With one angry caller, Hamburger claimed that Bob Dole had censored the show, to which the caller replied 'Yeah, fuck Bob Dole!'. Hamburger then suggested the caller 'go down to the local wall' and spray paint 'Fuck Bob Dole' on it, to which the caller replied 'I'll spray paint everything'. This has become a joke with fans of Poolside Chats, who bring up their dislike for Dole because of his censorship.

Neil with King Buzzo from the Melvins.

Eventually Hamburger began breaking character - his voice changed from the Hamburger voice to his real voice, he repeatedly laughed and spoke 'un-Hamburger-like'. This increased when Hamburger was informed as to why Mania TV changed the feed - completely breaking character and actually looking shocked. This eventually led to everyone involved (Hamburger, Buzzo & Tom Green) ending the show early and abruptly, realizing that there really was no show.

The episode was briefly available to view on the On Demand section of the site, before being taken down. There has been some speculation as to why this was. Some have claimed that it is because the audio quality of the episode wasn't up to the standards of future shows. It is more likely that the reason was due to both Hamburger's breaking of character during the episode, and the general chaos the show had fallen into.

Episode 2 was also filmed 'live-to-tape' as technical difficulties meant the first few minutes of the show were not broadcast live, but the feed returned after, leading to humorous conversations between Hamburger, Pleaseeasaur and callers who did not know the feed was back up.

== The future of Poolside Chats ==
An episode of Poolside Chats was planned for February 12, 2007 with special guests King Buzzo and 'Quacker', but was pushed back to February 14, 2007, and then canceled altogether. This was mostly likely due to traveling issues as Hamburger was touring with Tenacious D as their opening act.

Hamburger had originally stated on the official forum for TomGreen.com that he would be available for a new episode to be filmed on either March 26 and/or 27, 2007. Instead of this, Hamburger appeared on the March 26 episode of Tom Green Live as a guest along with Steve-O and 'Quacker', who was to be a guest on Poolside Chats previously. During this show Hamburger walked off set. This combined with the removal of old episodes from the "On Demand" section of TomGreen.com, which targeted the 'silliness' and comedy Green has been previously associated with, made it uncertain if Hamburger and Poolside Chats would be returning for future episodes.

On the June 19, 2007 episode of Tom Green Live, which featured Hamburger as the guest, Tom Green stated that Poolside Chats was not canceled, and apologized to Hamburger for both his and Steve-O's behavior on the show. In typical Hamburger style this was blown off as Steve-O being 'on drugs' and that he 'needed help'.

On July 23, 2011 Hamburger responded to a fan on Twitter asking if there would ever be new Poolside Chats episodes by saying "50/50!".
