= JP Hasson =

American musician, comedian (born 1977)

JP Hasson is an American musician, comedian and artist, best known as the frontman for comedic musical act Pleaseeasaur. He also has a solo act, JP Incorporated. Hasson also produces comedy, music and television related tours. Hasson lives in Los Angeles.

== Biography ==
=== Early life ===
Born John-Peter Hasson, he grew up in the Seattle metropolitan area, in Poulsbo and Indianola, Washington. His father, artist Peter Hasson, gave him a music sequencer when he was 16 years old. In the 1990s, John-Peter began creating and composing improvised comedy songs and recording them on tape.

His early influences included the satirical punk group The Dead Milkmen. After a chance meeting with his idols, Hasson began collaborating with musician Joseph Genaro and they released a full-length album in 1994 under the band name We're Not From Idaho.

=== Career ===
In the years between 1997 and 2009, Hasson toured internationally under the name Pleaseeasaur, followed by his project JP Incorporated from 2009 to 2021. Both projects released several albums, two of which for Comedy Central Records. In 2025, Hasson released his first instrumental album of compositions, entitled "Wow!" under the name Hasco Enjoyments.

In 2012, JP launched his own Los Angeles based tour consulting firm specializing in the creation and production of international touring shows and exhibits. He currently produces and manages tours for Tim & Eric, On Cinema,Bob's Burgers, Pinback, Eric Andre and others. JP Hasson continues touring worldwide, mostly as Hasco Enjoyments.

He is a musician, visual artist and comedian based in Los Angeles, California.

== Discography ==
- Touch Me Zoo - Lawn King Wonderwear Music (1995)
- Touch Me Zoo - "Untitled EP" Wonderwear Music (1996)
- Touch Me Zoo - "Blow Up Your Stereo" Wonderwear Music (1996)
- Jiffy Squid - self-titled album (1996)
- Touch Me Zoo - "Ultra-Rare TMZ Vol. 3" (1997)
- Pleaseeasaur - "As Seen On TV" imputor? (1999)
- Pleaseeasaur - "Beef Flavored Island Adventures" Razler Records (2001)
- Pleaseeasaur - "Pleaseeasaur International Airport" V8 Records (Australia) (2003)
- Pleaseeasaur - "The Yellow Pages" imputor? (2003)
- Pleaseeasaur - "The Amazing Adventures of Pleaseeasaur" Comedy Central (2006)
- "Double Chunk Comedy Sampler" Comedy Central (2006)
- American Sheriff - "The Long Arm of the Law" imputor? (2007)
- Neil Hamburger/Pleaseeasaur - "Souvenir Record" (tour only 7" with cover art by Mark Mothersbaugh) Million Dollar Performances (2008)
- JP Incorporated - "An Album of Distinction" Comedy Central (2009)
- TWRP - "Ladyworld" appearing as narrator (2017)
- TWRP - "The Perfect Product" (2018)
- TWRP - "Return to Wherever" appearing as radio announcer (2019)
- JP Incorporated - "Massage & Spa" (2021)
- Hasco Enjoyments - "Wow!" (2025)

== Filmography ==
- "Cold Hearts" - Raven Pictures (1999)
- "Pleaseeasaur - Action Spectacular" imputor? (2005)
- "Pleaseeasaur - The Amazing Adventures of Pleaseeasaur" Comedy Central (2006)
- "Neil Hamburger Western Music and Variety" Drag City (2009)

== TV shows ==
- Late Night with Jimmy Fallon (NBC)
- Tom Green Live
- Tom Green's House Tonight
- Red Eye with Greg Gutfeld (Fox News)
- "The Xtacles" (Cartoon Network/Adult Swim)
- "Poolside Chats with Neil Hamburger" (as Pleaseeasaur)
