= Not the Green Tom Show =

Studio album by MC Face
- Released: June 20, 1998
- Genre: Comedy hip hop
- Length: 67:52
- Label: Ceiling Fan Records
- Producer: Tom Green (Executive)

MC Face chronology
Huh? Stiffenin' Against The Wall (with Organized Rhyme (1992)	Not the Green Tom Show (1998)	Prepare For Impact (2005)

Not the Green Tom Show, is the first release by Canadian rapper MC Face, released in 1998. The theme of the 26-track album revolves around MC Face, a pugnacious and foul-mouthed rapper who is constantly angry with and taking verbal jabs at Tom Green, his square producer who brings on some of his buddies from The Tom Green Show.

Lyrics by MC Face are interlaced with skits in which Face disses Green and a conflict culminates right up until the last track, a skit where Face goes completely crazy. In this mad blaze of rage Face slowly dissolves into Green and everything is out the window with Green ultimately regretting ever doing the album.

Even though this track reveals rather obviously that Green and Face are in fact the same, Tom Green swears that he and MC Face are not the same person (similar to the way Andy Kaufman would act when questioned about Tony Clifton). In reality, MC Face is Tom's alter-ego. MC Face constantly hates on Tom Green and some of his friends, including Glenn Humplik and Derek Harvie (Face actually builds a friendly relationship with Phil Giroux).

== Track listing ==
All Songs are produced by Tom Green except Slaughter Ya Oughta, Humplik The Baddest and Devil in the Scope which are produced by Shawn Greenson from Space Ace

#	Title	Guest Performer(s)	Time
1	"Intro"		0:40
2	"Not the Green Tom Show"		2:17
3	"My Girlfriend Died"		2:26
4	"Big Googely Eyes"		3:15
5	"Drug Boy (Prelude)"	Tom Green, Glenn Humplik	1:36
6	"Humplik The Baddest"		4:14
7	"Jiffy Pop"	MC Jiffy	1:53
8	"The Stake Out (Prelude)"	Tom Green	1:01
9	"Bank Robbery (Harvie & J-Roo)"		2:06
10	"Stupid Dummies"		3:00
11	"A Love Song"		2:57
12	"J-Roo and Face (Prelude)"	Tom Green, Phil Giroux	1:50
13	"J-Roo On The Loose"		2:58
14	"The Laugh You Do (Prelude)"	Phil Giroux	0:43
15	"Devil in the Scope"		4:20
16	"Rock The Mike Tonight"		2:57
17	"The Apology (Prelude)"	Tom Green	0:51
18	"Somethin To Chew On"		1:42
19	"Harvie's Babies (Prelude)"	Tom Green, Derek Harvie	1:48
20	"Sex Offender"		2:35
21	"MC Face On Patrol"		2:43
22	"Dustin Hoffman (Prelude)"	Tom Green, Glenn Humplik	1:23
23	"Slaughter Ya Oughta"	Shawn Greenson	2:59
24	"Just Hit Me"		2:54
25	"Extro"	Tom Green	1:36
26	"MC Face Goin Solo"		8:39
