= Rob LaBelle =

American-Canadian film and television actor

- Born: Robert Alan LaBelle; August 2, 1962 (age 64); Minneapolis, Minnesota, U.S.
- Education: Brown University
- Occupations: Film and television actor
- Children: 2; including Gabriel

Robert Alan LaBelle (born August 2, 1962) is an American-Canadian film and television actor. He is best known for playing Crazy Eddie in the Canadian science fiction television series First Wave.

== Life and career ==
LaBelle was born in Minneapolis, Minnesota. He attended Brown University, graduating in 1985. He began his screen career in 1987, appearing in the film Superstar: The Karen Carpenter Story. In 1989, he voiced the father in the short film He Was Once, and in 1992, he starred as Dave in the CBS live action television series The Amazing Live Sea Monkeys, starring along with Peter Pitofsky, Sean Whalen and Howie Mandel.

Later in his career, in 1998, LaBelle starred as Crazy Eddie in the CTV Sci-Fi Channel science fiction television series First Wave, starring along with Sebastian Spence, Roger Cross and Traci Lords. For his performance as Crazy Eddie, he was nominated for a Gemini Award in the category Best Performance by an Actor in a Featured Supporting Role in a Dramatic Series. After the series ended in 2001, he guest-starred in television programs including Star Trek: Voyager, NYPD Blue, Married... with Children, Quantum Leap, The X-Files, The Man in the High Castle, The Dead Zone and The John Larroquette Show. He played the recurring roles of Dr. Fredwick Walden in Smallville, Dr. David Ostrom in Terminal City, Dr. Nicholas Clayton in The 4400, D.A. Lars Boatman in So Help Me Todd, Mr. Jackson in Lost in Space and Phil Rosen in Da Vinci's Inquest and Da Vinci's City Hall.

In 2002, LaBelle starred as Sheldon Kasner in the film The Burial Society, starring along with Jan Rubeš, Allan Rich, David Paymer and Seymour Cassel. He also starred as Jacques in the 2005 film Bob the Butler, starring along with Tom Green and Brooke Shields. He appeared in films such as Wes Craven's New Nightmare, Watchmen, City Hall, Hot Tub Time Machine, Diary of a Wimpy Kid, Fido and Goodbye Lover.

== Personal life ==
According to The Vancouver Sun, LaBelle lived in Vancouver, British Columbia in the 1990s, and he married in 1995. His youngest son is the actor Gabriel LaBelle, best known for roles in The Fabelmans and Saturday Night.
