= Hollywood Causes Cancer =

Autobiography of Tom Green

Hollywood Causes Cancer:The Tom Green Story
- The Tom Green Story
- Author: Tom Green; Allen Rucker
- Cover artist: David Tran
- Language: English
- Genre: Autobiography
- Publisher: Three Rivers Press
- Publication date: 2004
- Publication place: United States
- Media type: Print (Hardback & Paperback)
- Pages: 257 pp (first edition, hardback)
- ISBN: 1-4000-5277-7
- OCLC: 62679739

Hollywood Causes Cancer: The Tom Green Story is the autobiography of Tom Green, co-written with Allen Rucker. Published in 2004, it recounts Green's upbringing and acting career.

== Synopsis ==
The book is an autobiography of Green's first 32 years of life. It recounts his beginnings growing up in Ottawa, Canada. It then goes on to detail his career beginnings, as he first appeared as a talk show host on a public access show in Canada. The book offers an inside view of Green's primary career successes and notable moments: his successful talk show The Tom Green Show on MTV, his appearance on Saturday Night Live, his short marriage to Drew Barrymore, and his films Road Trip and Freddy Got Fingered.

== See also ==
- The Tom Green Show
- Lonely Swedish (The Bum Bum Song)
