= Diagram of Suburban Chaos =

Electronic music composer

Diagram of Suburban Chaos is the pseudonym of William Collin Snavely, a composer of electronic music.

== Biography ==
Snavely has been creating electronic music in various forms since 1994, exploring editing waveforms on Amiga computers. Acquiring various pieces of gear as a teenager, the Ohio rave scene played a major part in his musical development. He and his older brother formed a musical partnership recording homebrewed techno to cassette with a mixer, old tape deck, samples, Roland Tr-606 and anything else he could find.

Snavely moved to Seattle in 1997, where he met Darrin Wiener, the cofounder of Imputor? Records. They worked together on several projects, and the first Diagram of Suburban Chaos album, Status Negatives, was released by Imputor? in 2002.

Snavely has released a number of tracks since then on labels including Tiger Style Records and Audiobulb. While his professional focus has moved more towards soundtrack composition and sound design , Snavely continues to write under the D.O.S.C. name and hopes to release a second album in the near future.

== Discography ==
- Status Negatives Imputor?
- Status Negatives (European Release CD) Zealectronic
- Mixed Signals: Cheetah (CD) Tiger Style
- Mixed Signals: Cheetah (2x12") Rocket Racer
- Extreme Electronics And Splintered Beats: Shielded By The Sun (UndaCova Remix) (2xCD) Darkmatter Soundsystem
- Intricate Maximals: So Gone (Ventrimix) (CD) Audiobulb
- Exhibition #3: Nerve Cycle (CD) Audiobulb
- Edge of the Pool (EP) Imputor?
- Ambit the Album (a.k.a. Taco 2) (EP) Imputor?
