= Imputor? =

American independent record label

imputor?
- Founded: 1999
- Founder: Darrin Wiener; Jordan Snodgrass
- Distributor: Allegro/NAIL
- Genre: Electronic, IDM, indie rock
- Country of origin: U.S.
- Location: Portland, Oregon; San Diego, California
- Official website: www.imputor.com

Imputor? is an independent record label founded in 1999 by Darrin Wiener (aka Plastiq Phantom) and Jordan Snodgrass.

Originally based in Seattle and San Diego, Imputor? began releasing experimental electronic music (also known as Intelligent dance music or IDM), and has since expanded into styles such as Indie rock and Comedy.

The label has released or distributed over 45 albums to date.

== History ==
The duo had first met 7 years earlier while attending high-school together in Vista, California, a suburb located in North San Diego County.

The name Imputor? is said to be a made-up contraction of the phrase "I am a computer." It was inspired by the title track Select Imputor? from Plastiq Phantom's debut CD-R EP which was released by the label in 1999.

The official logo of the label is a 5.25" floppy disk, a nostalgic relic from the founders' childhood exposure to computers.

In addition to releasing its own records, Imputor? has distributed other labels including Neverstop, Razler Records, and Mass Mvmnt

== Artists ==
- American Sheriff
- Aspects of Physics
- Calculator Man & Hangar
- Dalmatians
- Datascraper
- Diagram of Suburban Chaos
- DJs On Strike!
- El Poeta
- FCS North
- Halicon
- Masterdome
- Nando Costa
- Otto Von Schirach
- Plastiq Phantom
- Pleaseeasaur
- Psychic Emperor
- Scientific American
- Sindri
- T. Roberts
- The Snodgrass
- Vells
- World Gang

== See also ==
- List of companies based in Oregon
