= Mass mvmnt =

American record label

mass mvmnt
- Founded: 2004
- Genre: Electronic music Glitch hop Hip hop Breakbeat; Techno
- Country of origin: United States
- Location: Seattle, Washington
- Official website: www.massmvmnt.com

mass mvmnt is a record label in Seattle, Washington. The Pacific Northwest-based mass mvmnt (pronounced mass movement) was formed in 2004 by a group of music producers and artists.

== History ==
Though mass mvmnt's musical output is primarily electronic music with genres from dance music and glitchy 303 hip-hop to dub ambience and techno jazz, mass mvmnt is also associated with other work that parallels that endeavor such as: distribution, marketing, promotion & design.

== Roster ==
- AMS + Mugfrosty
- Caro
- FCS North
- DJ Fucking in the Streets
- The Long Ranger
- Michael Sloan
- Mr. Piccolo
- Nongenetic
- Plastiq Phantom
- Ruede Hagelstein
- Riow Arai
- Scientific American

== Discography ==
- (MM001) FCS North / Scientific American - fcssa
- (MM002) AMS + Mugfrosty - 2x4 mix
- (MM003) AMS + Mugfrosty - USA VS Japan
- (MM004) Scientific American & Plastiq Phantom - Tubes
- (MM005) FCS North – Arc
- (MM006) DJ Fucking in the Streets
- (MM007) FCS North - Say Go
- (MM008) Time Promises Power -Tomorrow Grieves Today
- (MM009) Scientific American - Mass Dstrction
- (MM010) Mr. Piccolo - Learning to Share
- (MM011) VA - Proud to Swim Home: A Backporch Revolution Compilation for New Orleans.
- (MM012) FCS North - In The Fall
- (MM014) Scientific American - Saints Of Infinity / Simulated D.I.Y.
- (MM015) Riow Arai - DJ Mix

== See also ==
- List of record labels
