= Plastiq Phantom =

American musician

- Origin: Seattle, Washington, U.S.
- Genres: Electronic music
- Years active: 1999–present
- Labels: Imputor? Neverstop
- Members: Darrin Wiener
- Website: wiener.us

Plastiq Phantom is the musical alias of Darrin Wiener, who records music ranging a wide variety of genres. Plastiq Phantom first began releasing music in 1999 with the self-released CD-R Select Imputor? EP, which became the impetus for the formation of his own record label imputor?.

His debut full-length Enjoy The Art Of Lying Down was released in 2001 on the Seattle label Neverstop. His self-titled second album was released October 19, 2004 by the imputor? label.

In addition to his own releases, Plastiq Phantom has been credited with production of many other acts including Vells, Psychic Emperor, Calculator Man & Hangar, Pleaseeasaur, and DJs On Strike!.

In 2004 Plastiq Phantom contributed music to the film Moog, about synthesizer guru Robert Moog.

In 2006, qp collaborated with comedy act Pleaseeasaur under the name American Sheriff. Their debut release Long Arm of the Law was released by imputor? Records.

Wiener worked with Modest Mouse on their record Strangers to Ourselves contributing modular synthesizer, 303 Programming, Audio engineer, and sound design.

== Discography ==
=== As Plastiq Phantom ===
- Select Imputor? EP (1999, imputor?)
- Enjoy The Art Of Lying Down (2001, neverstop)
- Split Pink 7" (2002, imputor?)
- 492 Cups To China 12 (2003, imputor?)
- Plastiq Phantom (2004, imputor?)
- Moog Original Soundtrack (2004, Hollywood Records)
- Tubes 12" (2006, imputor?)
- yanpaintswallsoranger" (2011, imputor?)
- Two Theremins (2012, imputor?)
- The Blue Tape (2016, imputor?)
- Concerts for 2 to 6 Instruments in Love Major (2017, Nona Records)

=== Collaborations ===
- World Gang - Drums 7" (2008, imputor?)
- World Gang - SLEEPTHROUGHJULYSPACE CAMPMORNINGCHANT (2008, imputor?)
- World Gang - Promise 1 (2011, imputor?)
- World Gang - Mechanic the Mushroom / Dolphin Smiles (2014, imputor?)
- Calculator Man & Hangar - It's Andersen, Not Anderson, Bytch! (2001, imputor?)
- DJs On Strike! - Something Fabulous For All The Bytches (2001, imputor?)
- DJs On Strike! - Too Hot For Solid Steel (2003, imputor?)
- DJs On Strike! - I'm So Happy EP (2004, imputor?)
- DJs On Strike! - I'm So Happy b/w Smells 12" Single (2004, imputor?)

=== Production, Technical & Musician Credits ===
- Lee Perry & Mouse on Mars- Spatial, No Problem (2026, Domino) : modular synthesizer
- Modest Mouse - Strangers to Ourselves (2015, Epic) : modular synthesizer, 303, sound manipulation, field recordings, kalimba, engineer
- Modest Mouse - No One's First, and You're Next (2009, Epic) : background vocals
- Modest Mouse - Perpetual Motion Machine (2009, Epic) : background vocals
- Vells - Integretron (2007, imputor?) : producer, engineer
- Psychic Emperor - Communication (2006, imputor?) : gameboy
- Dalmatians - Pop/Rock/Ruff Drafts (2004, imputor?) : producer, engineer
- Psychic Emperor - Psychic Emperor (2004, imputor?) : producer, engineer
- Vells - Flight From Echo Falls (2004, imputor?) : producer, engineer
