= Organized Rhyme =

Canadian hip-hop group

- Origin: Ottawa, Ontario, Canada
- Genres: Hip hop; comedy hip hop
- Years active: 1990–1993; 2011
- Label: A&M
- Past members: Tom Green (a.k.a. MC Bones); Greg Campbell (a.k.a. DJ Pin or Pin the Chameleon); Geordie Ferguson (a.k.a. DJ Signal)

Organized Rhyme was a Canadian hip hop group based in Ottawa, Ontario.

The group became one of the first Canadian rap acts to sign a record deal with a major label (A&M Records) and the video for their debut single "Check the O.R." won the MuchMusic Video Award for Best Rap Video in 1992. Comedian Tom Green was one of the group's founding members.

== History ==
Organized Rhyme was formed in 1990 by Tom Green (a.k.a. MC Bones), Greg Campbell (a.k.a. MC Pin or Pin The Chameleon) and Geordie Ferguson (a.k.a. DJ Signal). The group signed with A&M Records in 1991. The group released their debut album Huh!? Stiffenin Against the Wall in 1992. That same year the video for their first single "Check the O.R.", won the MuchMusic Video Award for Best Rap Video. In 1993 "Check the O.R." was also nominated for a Juno Award in the category of Best Rap Recording, but the song lost to "Keep It Slammin'" by Devon.

The group toured with such artists as The Barenaked Ladies, Dream Warriors and Maestro Fresh Wes. They disbanded shortly after the release of their first album.

Green's 2005 rap album Prepare for Impact included a bonus DVD that contained both a live solo-performance of "Check the O.R." as well as a recording of the original music video.

Organized Rhyme reunited and recorded a new video for "Check the O.R." for the 2011 Just for Laughs festival in Montreal, Quebec.

== Discography ==
=== Huh!? Stiffenin Against the Wall (1992) ===
No.	Title	Length
1.	"Prelude 1"	0:43
2.	"Head for the Border"	3:22
3.	"Bring the Horns"	4:38
4.	"Luv 2"	3:52
5.	"Prelude 2"	0:55
6.	"Warm and Easy"	3:16
7.	"Check the O.R."	4:13
8.	"Armadillo Song"	2:52
9.	"Cookies and Crackers"	3:49
10.	"The Rain Song"	4:11
11.	"Papercuts"	5:29
12.	"Prelude 3"	0:27
13.	"The Idiots"	4:04
14.	"The Cutting Song"	1:24
15.	"Prelude 4"	0:36
16.	"Dabbling on the Mic"	3:28
17.	"Mind Your Business"	2:35
18.	"Prelude 5"	0:41
19.	"Happy Song"	3:55
20.	"Luv 1"	3:05
21.	"Prelude 6"	0:39
22.	"Check the O.R. (Bikini Drifter Mix)"	4:48

=== "Check the O.R." single (1992) ===
Side A
No.	Title	Length
1.	"Check The O.R. (Armadillo Mix)"	4:10
2.	"Check The O.R. (Rosebush Daddy Mix)"	6:13

Side B
No.	Title	Length
1.	"Check The O.R. (Armadillo Ex-tenda Mix)"	5:07
2.	"Check The O.R. (Bikini Drifter Mix)"	4:46

=== "Check the O.R." remix single (2000) ===
Side A
No.	Title	Length
1.	"Check The O.R. 2000 (Remix)"	6:24
2.	"Check The O.R. 2000 (Perry Alexander Remix)"	4:24

Side B
No.	Title	Length
1.	"Check The O.R. 2000 (Tyson Remix)"	5:02
2.	"Check The O.R. 2000 (Original Mix)"	4:20

== See also ==
- Canadian hip hop
- Music of Canada
