= Tom Green's House Tonight =

Syndicated talk show

- Title card
- Created by: Tom Green
- Starring: Tom Green
- Theme music composer: Tom Green
- Country of origin: United States
- Original language: English
- No. of episodes: 176

Production
- Executive producer: Tom Green/ Kari Sagin
- Camera setup: Multi-camera setup
- Running time: 60 minutes

Original release
- Network: TomGreen.com (2006 – 2011); ManiaTV! (2006 – 2007); The Comedy Network (2008 – 2009); AXS TV (2013 – present)
- Release: June 15, 2006 – present

Tom Green's House Tonight (formerly known as Tom Green Live!) is a talk show hosted by Tom Green. In addition to its primary Internet broadcast on TomGreen.com, the show has been syndicated on television stations throughout North America.

The broadcast is mostly spontaneous with a reliance on celebrity guests and viewer interaction via Skype calls and phone calls. Before moving to a regular television studio, the show was set inside Green's living room in the Hollywood Hills, where a fully functional low-budget studio had been constructed.

Beginning February 4, 2013, Green replaced Tom Green's House Tonight with Tom Green Radio, a weekly audio podcast recorded in a Hollywood studio. As of October 3, 2013, Tom Green Live returned to television with a weekly broadcast on AXS TV.

== Origins ==
Tom Green conceived the idea for the show in 2005, deciding that if it were technically feasible and economically viable, he’d be happiest doing his own nightly talk show from his living room. Green went on to approach online television network ManiaTV! with the idea. On June 5, 2006, ManiaTV! announced they had signed Green to host a live talk show from his own home and would give him complete creative control. Green provided his desk, as used on The New Tom Green Show, and ManiaTV! provided the additional equipment.

The first show aired live on June 15, 2006 at 11pm ET, and was originally called Tom Green Live!. The show was initially only scheduled to air on Thursday nights, but soon expanded to air Monday-Thursday.

Early shows often included technical issues with the phone system, computers, streaming and audio. Many viewers found Green's reactions to the technical problems to be entertaining as opposed to a hindrance to the show. Green's regular outbursts towards his off camera staff have become a running joke.

== Webovision ==
While it is not the first Internet show, Tom Green's House Tonight may be the first Internet call-in talk show, and Green frequently cites this as an innovation. With little reliance on advertisement funding, his show is similar to Public-access television. Green often refers to it by a word he coined: "Webovision", and jokingly says he is broadcasting to "The National Internet", despite the show having a worldwide audience, and joked that his show is "the highest rated, longest running, and only talk show on the Internet." Fellow comedian Joe Rogan named the show as an influence on his own podcast, The Joe Rogan Experience. Green has likewise been cited by numerous podcasters and other online content creators as a pioneer in the medium.

The show is not bound by FCC regulations, and therefore has very few content restrictions, such as a ban on swearing, nudity or drinking. Green has stated: "I don't go out of my way to be shocking on the show. I'm really trying to take advantage of the looseness of the medium and the ability to be completely honest, real and in the moment like the way television was when it first started". The show is not scripted or rehearsed; the emphasis in every broadcast is on the conversation between Green and his guests. The relaxed and unrestricted nature of the show, along with the fact they are in Green's own home, often leads to a very natural and open style of interview rarely found on other talk shows.

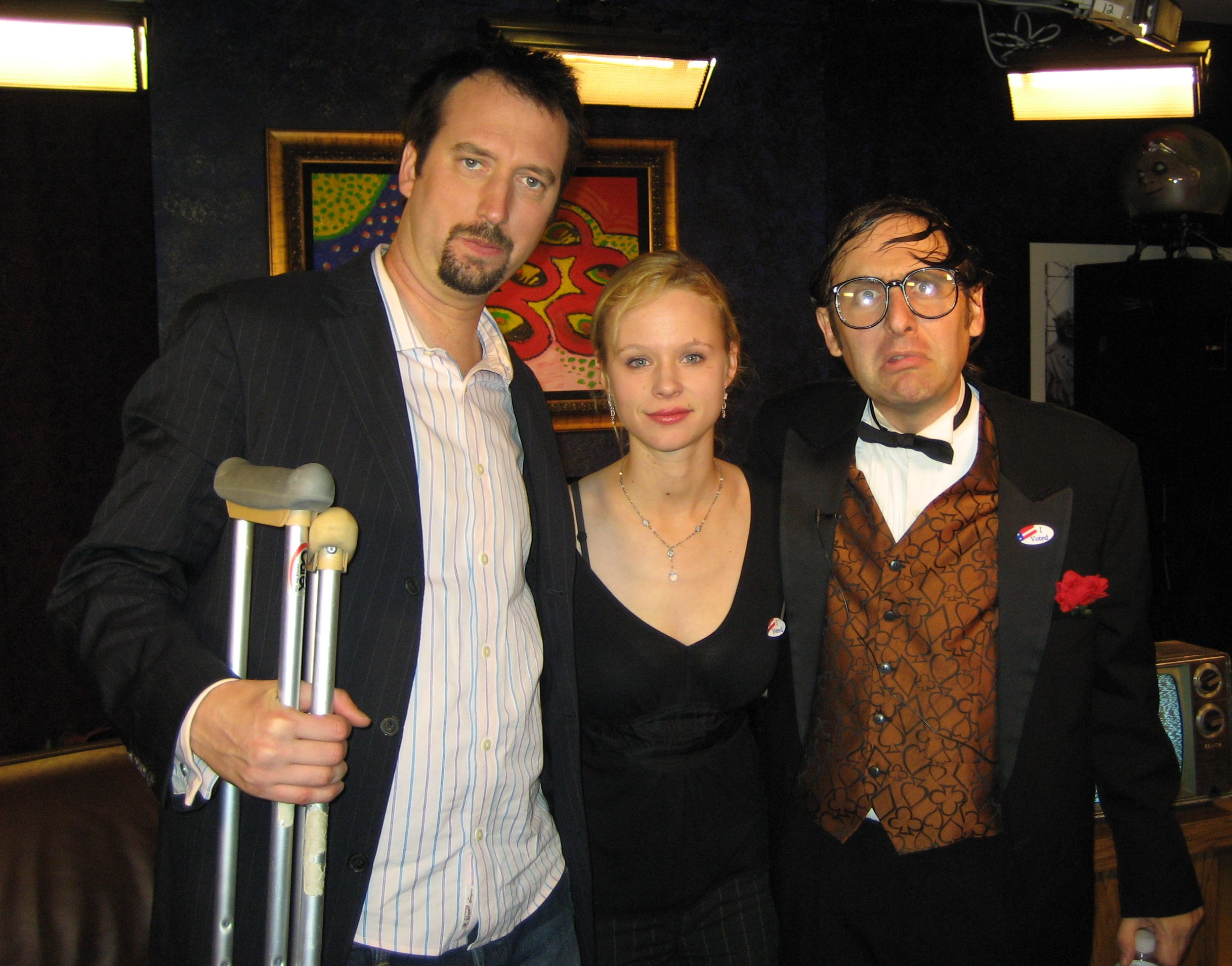
Tom Green with guests Thora Birch and Neil Hamburger at The Channel in 2006

Many notable guests have appeared on the show, including stars such as Pamela Anderson, Kat Von D, actors Val Kilmer, Brooke Shields, Crispin Glover and Thora Birch, hip-hop artists Flavor Flav and Xzibit, talk show hosts Jimmy Kimmel and Carson Daly, musicians Henry Rollins and Dave Navarro, pro wrestler Stone Cold Steve Austin, skateboarder Tony Hawk, as well as comedians Tim & Eric, Neil Hamburger, Joe Rogan, and Andrew Dice Clay.

Despite Green's serious talk-show demeanor, the show receives occasional prank calls, and Green often entices the callers during the resultant interactions. Green has decided not to use a call screener and has said: "There are nights when we’ve gotten like six prank phone calls in a row, but that becomes kind of funny, too. Whatever happens, happens".

The show most recently aired live Monday to Friday at 10pm ET for one hour, occasionally going over the hour. At the present time, the show does not adhere to a set schedule. At any time of the day or night Green can spontaneously go on the air by literally flipping a switch on a remote control, which turns on all of the lights and cameras, hits record and sends out the feed to TomGreen.com. Most shows can be viewed in the Videos section of TomGreen.com, and had also been made available for download via iTunes. The total number of video views have reached up to 38 million downloads per month.

== The Channel ==
Tom Green refers to his website as "The Channel". The output of The Channel is not limited to Tom Green's House Tonight. Shows appearing on The Channel can vary significantly in length and can last for many hours.

=== Shows ===
Other shows broadcast on The Channel have included:

- Poolside Chats - Talk show hosted by comedian Neil Hamburger
- Leonard Mills Live - Green in character playing guitar and singing, often about ridiculous subjects
- YouTube Special - Green plays and comments on a selection of videos from YouTube
- The Tom and Larry Show - Green has a discussion with Larry, his foul-mouthed ventriloquist dummy
- Casual Friday - Green, with no guest at his house, instead interacts with viewers
- The Robert Kurtz Show - Call in show featuring funny or shocking internet content suggested by viewers, hosted by former The Channel producer Robert Kurtz
- Mysteries from Beyond the Other Dominion - Call in show offering insight into the paranormal and scientific discoveries, hosted by Dr. Franklin Ruehl
- Girl Talk Live - Call in show providing viewers with advice about various subjects, co-hosted by a number of female models
- Freestyle Friday - House party featuring a large number of guests and live music
- Tom Green This Morning - Morning show hosted by Green
- Prankity Pranx - Call in show devoted to prank calls
- Black Spanish Fly and the Dick - Call in show

On occasion, when Green does not have guests, he has broadcast an unconventional show, such as playing the saxophone for an hour and having a week dedicated to performing karaoke. Green has also slept with a live camera on him all night, which is also the practice of several lifecasters.

=== Additional broadcasts ===
In addition to broadcasts from Green's home, Green frequently posts footage filmed around Hollywood and Los Angeles, including video recorded with his camera phone. Green sometimes takes a video camera with him when taking a break from The Channel and posts pre-recorded clips such as his visits to Costa Rica and New York. He once showed his surgery after a skateboarding accident. In 2008, The Channel embarked on its first road trip across the west coast of America. Green and his team travelled in an RV that had been equipped to allow cameras to be set up in remote locations whilst broadcasting a live video stream using wireless technology. A fixed camera located behind the front windscreen of the RV enabled viewers to follow along with the journey. In January 2010, Green began his first ever stand-up comedy world tour.

The Channel broadcasts a video stream to the internet 24/7. Between live shows the feed either switches to a security camera within Green's living room, a selection of clips from previous episodes, or a test card consisting of the Tom Green's House Tonight title screen.

== Sponsors and partners ==
Samsung was the show's first sponsor, advertising the Samsung Upstage phone. Budweiser became the next sponsor. Bud Light commercials were played before each show. Product placement was also used as bottles of Bud Light would be provided for Green and his guests during every show. Bottles of the beer could also be seen in Green's fridge.

ManiaTV! was Green's original partner and funded the installion of his living room studio. Green's split from ManiaTV! in August 2007 necessitated upgrades to the equipment and technology used to produce and stream the show. With the upgrades complete, Green launched the all-new TomGreen.com on September 27, 2007, with the help of producer Victor Borachuk. The new site implemented new technology, featuring full 16:9 live Flash video, and was streamed by BitGravity, a content delivery network. BitGravity CEO Perry Wu has been interviewed on the show. NewTek provide much of the video switching equipment.

== Membership service ==
On March 11, 2009, a new membership service was launched to provide funding for The Channel. Subscribers to the service receive access to the full video archive. Green's intention is for viewer funding to allow him total creative freedom over The Channel by removing the need for financial support from TV networks and corporate sponsors. However, Green has confirmed he is talking to possible business partners for his show. On February 10, 2010, additional features were added to the membership service, including forums, the ability to comment on videos, and priority when Skype calling into the show. In early 2011, the membership service was discontinued as Green took a hiatus from The Channel to focus on his stand-up comedy world tour.

== Television syndication ==
=== The Comedy Network ===
After his split from ManiaTV!, Green hinted that a new partnership would lead to Tom Green Live! being broadcast on television as well as the Internet. In October 2007, Broadcasting & Cable announced the show's January 2008 expansion to TV syndication in a deal with Debmar-Mercury.

To coincide with the television debut Tom Green Live! was renamed Tom Green's House Tonight, and bleachers were built in Green's living room to seat a small audience consisting of friends of his guests. Beginning January 7, 2008, the show appeared in a pared-down version on conventional TV on The Comedy Network. The show ran on television for two seasons before Green decided to stop syndication, primarily due to dissatisfaction towards his loss of creative control.

=== Tom Green Live (standup special) ===
Tom Green Live was also the name of Green's standup special that was released on Showtime in August 2012 and on Netflix. This was recorded at The Wilbur Theatre in Boston, Massachusetts in September 2011.

=== AXS TV ===
Tom Green Live title card

On October 3, 2013, Tom Green Live debuted on AXS TV. The weekly live broadcast airs at 9pm ET every Thursday night from a studio in Los Angeles. The telecast has a similar format to the web show, with an hour long discussion between Green and his featured guest and live Skype calls from viewers. Although it is intended for the series to showcase Green's more serious side and highlight his skills as an interviewer, he has advised viewers to expect "spontaneous, ridiculous, and outrageous conversations". Guests have included Richard Belzer, Howie Mandel and Tony Hawk. Season 2 debuted on January 9, 2014 and the finale was April 3, 2014. The show was renewed with season 3 debuting on June 12, 2014 with guest Steve Carell. The series was produced and directed by Devin DeHaven.

== Notable episodes ==
- On June 15, 2006, Tom Green Live! made its debut broadcast. Green's guest was the marionette Howdy Doody. Green celebrated the completion of the first episode by diving fully clothed into his swimming pool.
- On August 31, 2006, Green, increasingly frustrated by technical issues with the phone system, destroyed the Pepper Pad supplied by ManiaTV! for handling viewer calls. ManiaTV! responded by cutting off the live feed during that night's debut episode of Poolside Chats with Neil Hamburger. Hamburger and his guest, musician Buzz Osborne, were unaware of the situation until being notified by viewers. Green later made an on-air apology for his actions.
- On October 10, 2006, the longest standard format show, in which Green interviewed Steve-O, ran for four hours and ended with Green drunk and Steve-O heavily intoxicated from a combination of hash brownies and nitrous oxide. In addition to large amounts of alcohol, Green and his guest drank mustard and a bottle of salad dressing. The show went off the air after Steve-O had vomited and both men had collapsed.
- On October 25, 2006, Green's guests included pro skateboarder Jeremy Klein and Count Smokula. Klein became the first and only guest to be kicked off the show, after making insulting comments about a number of callers. He has since returned as a guest several times.
- In March 2007, Green celebrated having passed the milestone of 100 Tom Green Live! episodes with a special show broadcast from the Denver studio of ManiaTV!. It was the first show to be broadcast from outside of Green's home.
- On July 27, 2007, the highest rated show was broadcast, featuring Kat Von D as the guest. The episode has reached 2.7 million views.
- On January 7, 2008, Tom Green's House Tonight made its television debut, featuring comedian Harland Williams as the guest.
- On March 23, 2009, the majority of the show consisted of Green launching an expletive-laden tirade in response to comments mocking the Canadian Military made on the Fox News talk show Red Eye w/ Greg Gutfeld. Green had spent his early childhood living on a Canadian Armed Forces base where his father served as a captain.
- On July 30, 2009, the longest live broadcast was shown during Green's 38th birthday party and lasted for over six hours.
- On May 20, 2010, the episode was guest hosted by comedian Norm Macdonald, allowing Tom Green to instead be interviewed as a guest on his own show for the first time.
- On October 3, 2013, Tom Green Live made its television debut on AXS TV, featuring comedian Richard Belzer as the guest.

== Awards and accolades ==
- On November 26, 2007, the show won the TV Guide award for “Best Web Talk Show”.
- On May 6, 2008, the show was announced as the winner of a Webby Award for "Best Variety Show" in the Online Film and Video category.
- On September 23, 2009, the show was listed among the best shows on the internet by the Los Angeles Times publication, Brand X.
