= Bob the Butler =

- Film poster
- Directed by: Gary Sinyor
- Written by: Jane Walker Wood; Steven Manners; Gary Sinyor
- Produced by: Esther Randall; Gavin Wilding
- Starring: Tom Green; Brooke Shields; Genevieve Buechner; Benjamin B. Smith; Rob LaBelle; Valerie Tian; Simon Callow; Iris Graham
- Cinematography: Jason Lehel
- Edited by: Richard Overall
- Music by: David A. Hughes
- Production company: Park Entertainment
- Distributed by: First Independent Pictures; Vivendi Entertainment
- Release dates: August 28, 2005 (Disney Channel); December 20, 2005 (DVD)
- Running time: 90 minutes
- Country: United States
- Language: English

Bob the Butler is a 2005 American family comedy film directed by Gary Sinyor and starring Brooke Shields and Tom Green.

== Plot ==
Bob, a man who can't hold a job, discovers an ad in the Yellow Pages for a butler school. Anne Jamieson, a single mother and neat freak, hires Bob as her butler.

== Cast ==
- Tom Green as Bob Tree
- Brooke Shields as Anne Jamieson, Bob's love interest
- Rob LaBelle as Jacques
- Genevieve Buechner as Tess Jamieson, Anne's daughter
- Benjamin Smith as Bates Jamieson, Anne's son
- Valerie Tian as Sophie, Tess's friend
- Simon Callow as Mr. Butler
- Nicole Potvin as Morgan
- Iris Graham as Mama Clara

== Production ==
Bob the Butler was originally planned to be released in theaters October 2005 with a presumed PG-13 rating, but instead premiered on Disney Channel on August 28, 2005, in an edited down PG version. The edited PG version of the film was made available on DVD on December 20, 2005.

== Music ==
Tom Green performed the credits music "My Name is Bob", which was a track produced by Mike Simpson of The Dust Brothers. The background music for that track ended up being used for Green's 2005 single Teachers Suck from his rap album Prepare For Impact.
