= The Burial Society =

- Directed by: Nicholas Racz
- Written by: Nicholas Racz
- Produced by: Richard Baumgartel; J. Todd Harris; Raymond Massey
- Starring: Rob LaBelle; Jan Rubeš; Allan Rich; Bill Meilen; David Paymer; Seymour Cassel
- Cinematography: Danny Nowak
- Edited by: Jeremy Presner
- Music by: George Blondheim
- Distributed by: Regent Releasing
- Release dates: October 7, 2002 (Canada); May 28, 2004 (United States)
- Running time: 94 minutes
- Countries: Canada; United States
- Language: English

The Burial Society is a 2002 is a neo-noir thriller film written and directed by Nicholas Racz. The film stars Rob LaBelle, Jan Rubeš, Allan Rich, Bill Meilen, Seymour Cassel, and David Paymer. The film follows a lonely, depressed Jewish man who becomes involved in the mafia.

== Plot ==
The Burial Society tells the story of Sheldon Kasner, whose existence has recently turned to one of quiet anxiety. His workload is mounting as his reimbursement for it continues to diminish, and Sheldon justifiably falls into a deep depression. Despite being a highly unlikely candidate for organized crime, he is drawn into a complicit money-laundering scam that doesn't run as planned. With a two-million-dollar debt on his hands, Sheldon devises a complicated plan: staging his own death with the help of the Chevrah Kadisha, or the "Burial Society," a mysterious group of devout Jewish men who have dedicated themselves to preparing dead bodies for their final resting place. Unbeknownst to Sheldon, the Burial Society sees the incompetent businessman as the only hope for the continued existence of their tradition. As they initiate him into their peculiar, ritualistic world, Sheldon believes his life is leisurely getting back on track; however, the men of the Burial Society may have something else in mind for him.

== Reception ==
=== Critical reception ===
The Burial Society got mediocre reviews when it was released in the US in 2004. The film has a score of 53 out of 100 on Metacritic based on reviews from 5 critics. The film has a 50% rating on Rotten Tomatoes based on 16 reviews.

=== Awards ===
The film won the award for Best Production Design in a Feature Length Drama for James Hazell at the 2003 Leo Awards. It was also nominated in the categories of Best Cinematography, Best Director, Best Male Lead Performance, Best Musical Score, Best Program, and Best Screenplay. In addition to this the film won Best Film at the 2004 Louisville Jewish Film Festival; Best Cinematography and Best Production Design at the Milan International Film Festival; and Best Canadian Screenplay at the Vancouver International Film Festival. The film also won awards from the New Orleans Film Festival and Nanaimo inFEST Film Festival.

== Cast and crew ==
Actor	Role
Rob LaBelle	Sheldon Kasner
Jan Rubeš	Marvin Telekunsky
Allan Rich	Hy Leibowicz
Bill Meilen	Harry Epstein
David Paymer	Morry Zimmer
Seymour Cassel	Sam Goldberg
Jeff Seymour	Jake Lightman
Bill Mondy	Stuart Lightman
Linden Banks	Rabbi Fernstein
