= Psychic Emperor =

- Origin: Seattle, Washington, USA
- Genres: Indie rock Electronic
- Years active: 2004–present
- Label: Imputor?
- Members: Jeremiah Green; Tristan Marcum; Mary Thinnes; Darrin Wiener
- Website: http://www.psychicemperor.com/

Psychic Emperor is a pop-electronic collaboration between Tristan Marcum and the production of Plastiq Phantom. Their debut self-titled full-length was released December 17, 2004 on imputor? Records. In December 2006, Psychic Emperor released Communications, a 6-track EP containing live tracks recorded at Los Angeles' KXLU radio station. Psychic Emperor is also known for their indie rock covers of The Misfits Songs, including Angelfuck, Where Eagles Dare, Hybrid Moments, Last Caress and more.

== Members ==
- Tristan Marcum - Vocals, Guitar - See also: Vells
- Darrin Wiener - Beats, Production - See also: Plastiq Phantom
- Jeremiah Green - Drums/Percussion, Guitar, Harp, Sound Effects - See also: Modest Mouse, Vells, Red Stars Theory
- Mary Thinnes - Keyboards - See also: Vells
- James Bertram - Bass - See also: Built to Spill, Red Stars Theory, 764-HERO
- Stuart Fletcher - Bass - See also: The Sorts
- Adam Howry - Bass
- Seth Warren - Violin - See also: Red Stars Theory, FCS North
- Brent Arnold - Cello

== Discography ==
- Psychic Emperor (imputor?, 2004)
- Communication (imputor?, 2006)
