= Basement Jams =

Studio album by Tom Green
- Released: January 19, 2008
- Genre: Hip hop

Tom Green chronology
Prepare For Impact (2005)	Basement Jams (2008)

Basement Jams is the third studio album by Tom Green. It was released in 2008 in download only format on his website tomgreen.com.

== Track listing ==
No.	Title	Length
1.	"My Introduction"
2.	"All She Wrote"
3.	"Show You How"
4.	"Dangerous"
5.	"Such a Rush"
6.	"Bobbin' to the Right"
7.	"Focus"
8.	"Rap Overdose"
9.	"Sound So Wack"
10.	"State of Emergency"
11.	"Bum Bum 2007"
12.	"Losin' It"
