= Lonely Swedish (The Bum Bum Song) =

1999 novelty song by Tom Green

Single by Tom Green
- Released: 1999
- Recorded: 1999
- Genre: Novelty; comedy hip-hop; rap rock
- Length: 2:38
- Songwriter: Tom Green
- Producer: Tom Green

Tom Green singles chronology
"Lonely Swedish (The Bum Bum Song)" (1999)	"I'm an Idiot" (2005)

"Lonely Swedish (The Bum Bum Song)" is a novelty song by Canadian comedian Tom Green, created in 1999 for The Tom Green Show. When the show moved to MTV, Green released it as a single, encouraging visitors to download the song (an mp3) for free from his website, burn it onto CDs and distribute it to friends. The music video was filmed by Jeff Boggs in Seattle, Washington.

This song's nonsensical, comedic lyrics and video deal with various objects upon which the narrator's buttocks are placed, such as a step, a taxi, a railing, a table, cheese pizzas, bubblegum, a dog, a cat, a telephone, an old man, a boat (inaccurately described as a battleship), and the letters SWEDISH in front of the Swedish Medical Center, from which the name of the song is derived.

The full music video which aired on MTV's The Tom Green Show shows Green in a variety of costumes and settings, placing his bum on objects and doing stunts, such as grabbing onto a moving vehicle while riding a skateboard. He arrives at Lake Washington where he wades in to find a loon which is actually a duck decoy.

The song's lyrics were interpolated in the first verse of "The Real Slim Shady" (2000) by Eminem and again in “Without Me” (2002). The video also featured Eminem in a superhero outfit similar to the one worn in Green's video.

== Overview ==
The song came about when Green recorded a comedy sketch on a cruise ship as he wandered the decks bothering people. Following an altercation with a ship employee, he began rubbing his bottom against a rail, singing, "My bum is on the rail, my bum is on the rail." The incident inspired Green to compose the full song.

Green filmed a music video and aired it on his talk show, encouraging viewers to call MTV's Total Request Live (TRL) and request the song. The song became so popular it went to number one on TRL and executives of the program made Green retire it from the show the following week, a decision that Green agreed upon but regretted.

== Legacy ==
The song's promotional music video was a great success on Total Request Live. It was retired the day it reached number one on the countdown (27 August 1999), and after just five total days on the show. Green stated that the reason for retiring the video was that "it's not fair to 98 Degrees." Later, in his autobiography Hollywood Causes Cancer, he revealed that MTV had pressured him to do so in order to maintain the image that Total Request Live was, in fact, a live show. The next week's episodes had already been taped on-location, and the producers of the show were completely unaware of the song at the time.

== See also ==
- Hollywood Causes Cancer – Autobiography of Tom Green
- Total Request Live – American music video television program
