= Interviewing Monsters and Bigfoot =

- Directed by: Thomas Smugala
- Written by: Thomas Smugala
- Starring: Tom Green; Les Stroud
- Distributed by: Level 33 Entertainment
- Release date: October 6, 2020
- Country: United States
- Language: English

Interviewing Monsters and Bigfoot is a 2020 American comedy film written and directed by Thomas Smugala and starring Tom Green, Les Stroud and William Standiford.

== Plot ==
Cory Mathis, a respected college professor, claims a mythical forest creature killed his wife transforming him into a man haunted by obsession and revenge. He partners up with legendary Big Foot hunter Fran Andersen who is out to collect the Nat Geo 10 million dollar bounty for capture of the creature. Unfortunately, by-the-book forest ranger, Billy Teal, a covert government agency and a serial hoaxer have other plans.

== Cast ==
- Tom Green as Billy Teal
- Les Stroud as Cory Mathis
- Tera Eckerle
- Quinn Strong
- Brian Kowalski
- Elise Edwards
- William Standiford as Sandy Johnson
- Stacy Brown Jr.
- A.J. Koehler
- Rick Dyer
- Jessi Combs

== Release ==
The film was released on VOD on October 6, 2020. It will be released on DVD on April 20, 2021.

== Reception ==
Brian Shaer of Film Threat gave the film a 6.5 out of 10.
