= Prepare for Impact =

Studio album by Tom Green
- Released: December 6, 2005
- Genre: Comedy hip hop
- Length: 39:11
- Label: ViK. Recordings
- Producer: Mike Simpson

Tom Green chronology
Not The Green Tom Show (as MC Face) (1998)	Prepare for Impact (2005)	Basement Jams (2008)

Professional ratings
Review scores
Source	Rating
Allmusic	3.5/5 stars
Jam!	4/5 stars
Tiny Mix Tapes	1.5/5 stars

Prepare for Impact is the second studio album by Tom Green. It was released through ViK. Recordings. It was produced by Mike Simpson of the Dust Brothers.

The Keepin' It Real Crew (Tom Green, "Playboy" Jeremy Klein, MC Shawn Anthony and Mike Simpson a.k.a. DJ EZ Mike) promoted this album release in June 2005 on the My Bum Is On Your Lips tour in Ontario, Canada.

== Track listing ==
1. "Write Rhymes and Act Like An Asshole" – 3:47
2. "My Bum Is On Ya Lips" – 3:21
3. "Mike Check" – 1:47
4. "I'm an Idiot" – 2:43
5. "Teachers Suck" – 3:59
6. "Science Is Everywhere" – 3:36
7. "People in My Neighborhood" – 4:23
8. "Goofy Rocking Chair" – 2:07
9. "My Name Is Hammy" – 2:55
10. "?" – 0:14
11. "I Like Hooters" – 3:49
12. "I'm No Comedian" – 2:45
13. "Don't Mess with a Man (After He Takes a Big Poo Poo)" – 3:38

== Single ==
- "Teachers Suck" (November 2005) (With different lyrics, this song was re-made for the Bob the Butler soundtrack, performed by Green, with the song being titled "My Name is Bob")
