= The Tom Green Show =

Television series

- Genre: Sketch comedy Surreal humor Variety
- Created by: Tom Green
- Written by: Tom Green; Derek Harvie
- Presented by: Tom Green
- Starring: Glenn Humplik; Phil Giroux; Derek Harvie
- Opening theme: "This Is The Tom Green Show"
- Countries of origin: Canada; United States
- No. of seasons: Rogers 22 – 3 seasons (50 ep.); The Comedy Network – 2 seasons (26 ep.); MTV – 3 seasons (29 ep.)

Production
- Production locations: Ottawa, Ontario, Canada
- Running time: 30 minutes (with commercials)
- Production company: MTV Productions

Original release
- Network: Rogers TV; The Comedy Network; MTV
- Release: September 1994 – March 2000

Related
- The New Tom Green Show; Tom Green Live! / Tom Green's House Tonight

The Tom Green Show is a television show, created by and starring Canadian comedian Tom Green, that first aired in September 1994. The series aired on Rogers Television 22, a community channel in Ottawa, Ontario until 1996, when a single pilot episode was made for CBC Television. The Comedy Network greenlit the show in 1997 and aired it for 2 seasons from 1998 to 1999.

In January 1999, the show moved to the United States and aired on MTV. The series stopped production in March 2000, due to Green's diagnosis of testicular cancer, but continued to appear on the channel via reruns and other promotional materials. In 2002, it was ranked #41 on TV Guide's 50 Worst TV Shows of All Time. In 2003, the show was briefly revived as The New Tom Green Show with a more conventional late night talk show format. In 2006, Green launched Tom Green Live, a live call-in show for his website, which was later renamed Tom Green's House Tonight.

== Synopsis ==
=== Personalities ===
The show was hosted by Tom Green, along with longtime friends Glenn Humplik and Phil Giroux. Derek Harvie, who co-wrote the show with Green, occasionally appeared in the segments. Many of the sketches were targeted at his parents, both of whom appear to be embarrassed and not impressed by their son's antics.

=== Stunts ===
Much of the show's humor was Tom Green's signature brand of shock comedy; numerous sketches featured Green performing bizarre or shocking acts in public, such as sucking on a cow's udder, and throwing plastic baby dolls at passing cars. This content was highly controversial, and the show quickly garnered many detractors. Perhaps most controversial was Green's treatment of his parents, who were often the targets of his pranks. In an infamous sketch, Green woke his parents in the middle of the night by placing a severed cow's head in their bed, a reference to a similar scene in The Godfather. During an interview with his parents for their 30th anniversary, he turned the discussion into asking questions about their sex life.

Despite the show's reputation for scatological and transgressive humor, several sketches featured Green performing in a responsible and respectful way, making fun of his juvenile persona. One of these sketches was "People Helpers", where Green and guest star Bruce McCulloch seriously assisted wheelchair users.

One segment saw Green crash a press conference for Grey Owl featuring Pierce Brosnan and Richard Attenborough. Green proceeded to serenade Brosnan with a song referencing both Remington Steele and The Fourth Protocol. Brosnan, assuming Green was a journalist, advised Green not to give up his day job.

=== Recurring characters and sketches ===
The show also had a few recurring characters and sketches, including Billy Bob (a redneck who loved caramels and shaking his leg), Hockey Guy (a hockey player who would skate up in front of people and clumsily fall down), and a police station sketch.

He also explored the quirks of his friends. Green drew attention to Giroux's unusual laugh and discomfort with the smell of copper. One sketch aired when Glen had to urinate, but couldn't because Tom and the camera crew were in proximity (but still reasonably far away). They aired clips from a lengthy argument of whether a bear or a cougar would win in a fight.

=== Tiger-Zebra ===
Tiger-Zebra
- Artist: Tom Green
- Year: 1998
- Medium: Painting Performance
- Movement: Contemporalism; Postmodernism
- Subject: Painting; Guerilla art Conceptual

Tiger-Zebra is a conceptual sketch and art piece featured in the show. It consists of a painting, called Tiger-Zebra, introduced, simply without any of the guards taking notice, to a local art gallery in a segment on the show. As the piece so was hanged on a wall in the gallery the painting is then interventioned, by Tom Green himself, inoff requests from some bystanders (gallery visitors); with a graffiti marker - seemingly adding a crude tree to it - while it is still being positioned on a wall at the current gallery exhibition.

=== Cow Brain Boat ===
In this the avant-garde sketch from the show Green is experimenting with (toy) models of boats and is swiftly seen in a toy store validating the models but eventually decides to go create his own boat from his own head. In the other scene Green could be seen with a sort of lexicon - which he briefly legislate for giving him the brand idea of a Cow Brain Boat. Green is then seen outside, with a handful of decapitated cow heads, being given the task to extract the brains from the cows. Green rightly does so and later apply the cow brains on a styrofoam base, further applying a sail on top, before he then position the boat in a lake and let it sail away.

=== Burning Feet Man ===
Burning Feet Man
- Artist: Tom Green
- Style: Surreal Sketch
- Organization: Writers Guild of America
- Powers: Nightvision; Heat Projection

Burning Feet Man is a surreal sketch and superhero being first conceptualized in a segment of the show. Though it is not clear exactly what good comes from the superhero - his powers can be simplified to be able to turn his boots on fire - without his fiery boots the hero seems out of "duty".

=== "The Bum Bum Song" ===
When the show moved to MTV, Green released a single called Lonely Swedish (The Bum Bum Song), encouraging visitors to download the song off his website, burn it onto CDs and distribute it to friends. After airing the music video on his show and appealing to his audience to request it, the song became an instant number one hit on Total Request Live. He quickly called for the video to be retired because "it's not fair to 98 Degrees." Later, in his autobiography, he revealed that MTV had pressured him to do so in order to maintain the image that Total Request Live was, in fact, a live request show (the next week's episodes had been pre-taped on location, and the producers of the show were completely unaware of "The Bum Bum Song" at the time).

=== Special episodes ===
In one episode that aired in early 2000, Green visited his parents in Ottawa, Ontario with Monica Lewinsky, and used the occasion to fool local reporters into thinking that they would make an important "announcement" together, which turned out to be related to Monica's new interest in designing fabric handbags.

In 2000, Green made a one-hour special out of his testicular cancer surgery. It focused on his reaction to the cancer diagnosis, as well as his family's, and footage of the actual surgery was included in one scene. The episode received wide critical acclaim for revealing a vulnerable, human side of an otherwise juvenile television personality.

In March 2002, he also starred in and directed a one-hour special called The Tom Green Subway Monkey Hour, where he harassed strangers in Japan.

== The New Tom Green Show ==
The show was briefly revived by MTV in 2003 as The New Tom Green Show, which was retooled to have a more standard late-night talk show format, but was cancelled by MTV a few months after its premiere due to plummeting ratings. The show ran for 51 episodes from June 23, 2003, to September 5, 2003. Its debut episode generated 871,000 viewers but the average viewership fell to 355,000 in September.

== Tom Green Live! / Tom Green's House Tonight ==
On June 15, 2006, Tom Green launched Tom Green Live!, a live call-in talk show broadcast on his website TomGreen.com. It began as a partnership between Green and ManiaTV!. In 2008, the show was renamed Tom Green's House Tonight. The show took place in Green's own living room in the Hollywood Hills overlooking the San Fernando Valley.
