= Allan Rich =

American actor (1926–2020)

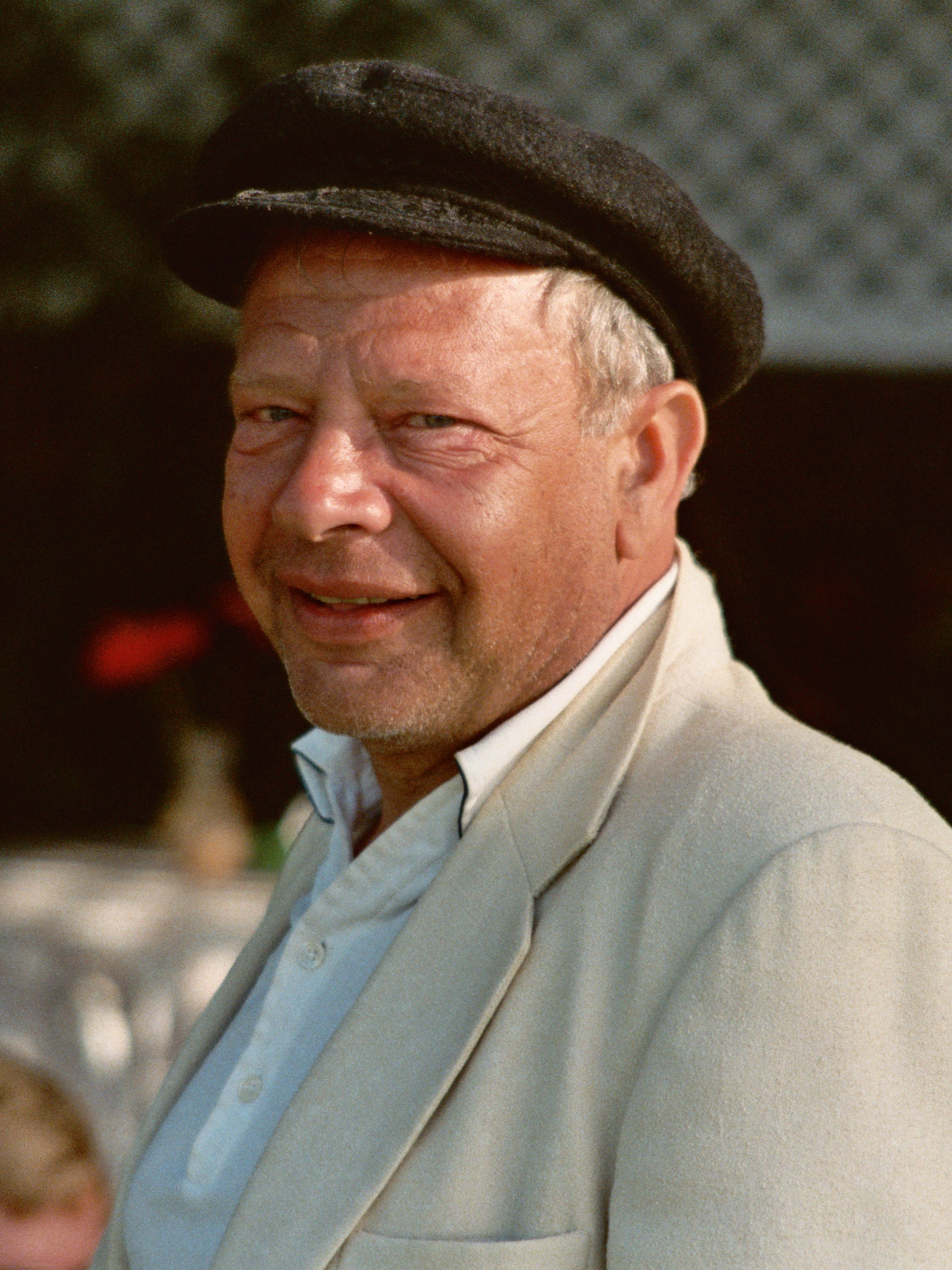
- Rich in 1984
- Born: Benjamin Norman Schultz; February 8, 1926; Astoria, Queens
- Died: August 22, 2020 (aged 94); Englewood, New Jersey, U.S.
- Occupation: Actor
- Years active: 1963–2014
- Spouse: Elaine Rich (m. 1951; died 2015)
- Children: 2

Benjamin Norman Schultz (February 8, 1926 – August 22, 2020), known professionally as Allan Rich, was an American character actor.

== Early life and career ==
Rich was born to a Jewish family in Astoria, Queens, and his family moved to the Bronx when he was 6.

Rich began his acting career when he was nine years old. He appeared in the Broadway productions I'll Take the High Road (1943), Career Angel (1944), Darkness at Noon (1951), and The Emperor's Clothes (1953). In 1948, Rich played the title role in a production of Ben Jonson's Volpone in Yellow Springs, Ohio.

Beginning in 1979, Rich was distributor and publisher of Hollywood portraits made by George Hurrell.

== Personal life and death ==
Rich was one of the many alleged communist sympathizers blacklisted in the 1950s Hollywood blacklist. He married Elaine in 1951, who would go on to be a personal manager to a number of actors after the couple moved to Los Angeles in 1976. The couple had two children together. Elaine Rich died in 2015, aged 81.

Rich spent the last five years of his life as a resident at the Lillian Booth Actors Home, run by the Actors Fund of America. He died from progressive dementia in Englewood, New Jersey, in August 2020, at the age of 94.

== Activism ==
Rich was the co-founder of non-profit organization We Care About Kids, which produces educational short films for middle and high school youths.

== Filmography ==
Film
Year	Title	Role	Notes
1973	Serpico	Dist. Atty. Herman Tauber	
1974	The Gambler	Bernie	
1975	The Happy Hooker	Desk Sergeant	
1978	Uncle Joe Shannon	Dr. Clark	
1979	Voices	Montrose Meier	
1979	The Frisco Kid	Mr. Bialik	
1979	The Seekers	General Wayne	
1980	Hero at Large	Marty Fields	
1980	Leo and Loree	Jarvis	
1982	Eating Raoul	Nazi	
1982	The Entity	Dr. Walcott	
1982	Frances	Mr. Bebe	
1984	Kidco	Jim Clark	
1985	Rocky IV	Boxing Commissioner	Scene deleted
1986	Bad Guys	Luigi Constantine	
1989	Another Chance	J.R. Jacobs	
1989	Checking Out	Dr. Haskell	
1990	Betsy's Wedding	Nate Tobias	
1991	Highlander II: The Quickening	Allan Neyman	
1994	Quiz Show	Robert Kintner	
1994	Disclosure	Ben Heller	
1995	Two Much	Reverend Larrabee	
1996	Jack	Dr. Benfante	
1996	The Rich Man's Wife	Bill Adolphe	
1997	Out to Sea	Sebastian	
1997	Amistad	Judge Juttson	
1998	A League of Old Men	Judge	Also director
1998	Malaika	Sal's Pizza Customer	
1999	The Dogwalker		
2001	Skippy	Gordan Gates	
2002	The Burial Society	Hy Leibowicz	
2003	Intoxicating	Michael Reilly	
2006	The Alibi	Klump	
2007	Man in the Chair	Speed	
2007	The Memory Thief	Zvi	
2007	Rise: Blood Hunter	Harrison	
2007	My Sexiest Year	Papa	
2008	The Last Word	Francis	
2013	Rain from Stars	Old John	
2014	Wish I Was Here	Klump	Final film role
Television
Year	Title	Role	Notes
1975	The Rockford Files	Charles R. "Pebbles" Runkin	Episode: "The Hammer of C Block
1977	The San Pedro Beach Bums	Captain Rossinki	Episode: "The Bums vs. the Reds"
1977	Hawaii Five-O	Lou Marvin	Episode: "Practical Jokes Can Kill You"
1979	Happy Days	Professor Thomas	Episode: "Potsie Quits School"
1979	The Seekers	Gen. "Mad Anthony" Wayne	2 episodes
1979	Barney Miller	Mr. Ramson, the furrier	Episode: "Voice Analyzer"
1980	CHiPs	Judge Towers	Episode: "Jailbirds"
1981–1983	Hill Street Blues	Judge Maurice Schiller	4 episodes
1981	Barney Miller	Lenord the theatre producer	Episode: "Resignation"
1982	Barney Miller	Edward Meyers	Episode: "Inquiry"
1983	Magnum, P.I.	Coluga	Episode: "From Moscow to Maui"
1986	Life With Lucy	The Judge	Episode: "Lucy, Leagle Beagle"
1987	The Golden Girls	Alexi	Episode: "Letter to Gorbachev"
1995	The Nanny	Judge	Episode: "The Party's Over"
1998	The New Batman Adventures	Edward "King" Barlowe	Voice, episode: "Joker's Millions"
2000–2001	Judging Amy	Jim Southam	4 episodes
2004	Curb Your Enthusiasm	Solly	Season 4
2010	House M.D.	Sidney	Episode: "Selfish"
