= Vells =

American indie rock band

Vells (band)
- Origin: Seattle, Washington, USA
- Genres: Indie rock
- Years active: 2001–present
- Label: Imputor?
- Spinoffs: Psychic Emperor
- Members: Tristan Marcum; Mary Thinnes; Adam McCollom
- Past members: Jeremiah Green; Ryan Kraft; Adam Howry
- Website: https://www.vells.net/

Vells is an indie rock band from Seattle, Washington. The band was formed by Tristan Marcum and Ryan Kraft along with Modest Mouse drummer Jeremiah Green after his brief departure from the group in 2001. After releasing their self-titled debut EP on Seattle's Luckyhorse Industries in 2003, Vells signed with the experimental label imputor? and released their debut full-length Flight From Echo Falls on September 7, 2004. After the release of Flight From Echo Falls' and the subsequent departure of two of its founding members; Guitarist Ryan Kraft and Bassist Adam Howry, the band reformed with a new DIY approach to recording.

In 2004 the members of Vells formed a pop-electronic side-project named Psychic Emperor.

In 2007, Vells released their second full-length titled Integretron on imputor? Records.

In 2022, Jeremiah Green died on New Year's Eve after a Stage IV cancer diagnosis.

== Members ==
- Jeremiah Green - Drums - See also: Modest Mouse, Psychic Emperor, Red Stars Theory
- Tristan Marcum - Guitar/Vocals - See also: Psychic Emperor
- Mary Thinnes - Keyboards - See also: Psychic Emperor
- Adam McCollom - Bass

== Discography ==
- Vells (Luckyhorse Industries, 2003)
- In The Hours 7" Single (Luckyhorse Industries, 2003)
- Flight From Echo Falls (imputor?, 2004)
- Integretron (imputor?, September 18, 2007)
