= Pepper Pad =

Linux-based mobile computer

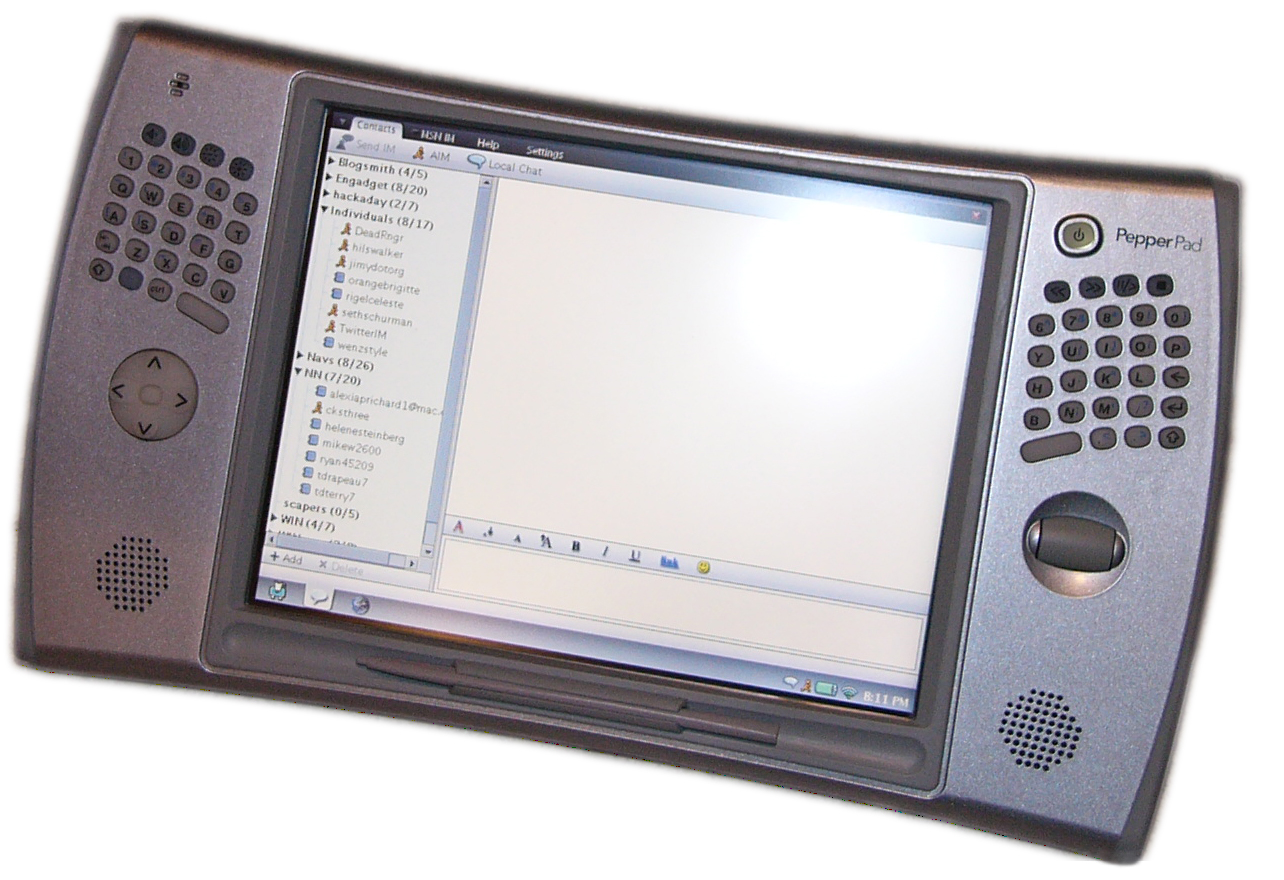
Pepper Pad 2

The Pepper Pad was a family of Linux-based mobile computers with Internet capability and which doubled as a handheld game console. They also served as a portable multimedia device. The devices used Bluetooth and Wi-Fi technologies for Internet connection. Pepper Pads are now obsolete, unsupported and the parent company has ceased operations.

The original prototype Pepper Pad was built in 2003 with an ARM-based PXA255 processor running at 400 MHz, an 8-inch touchscreen in portrait mode, a split QWERTY keyboard, and Wi-Fi. Only 6 were made, and it was never offered for sale. The Pepper Pad was a 2004 Consumer Electronics Show (CES) Innovations Awards Honoree in the Computer Hardware category.

The Pepper Pad 2 was introduced in 2004 with a faster 624 MHz PXA270 processor and the screen was rotated to a landscape format. The Pepper Pad 2 was the first Pepper Pad offered for commercial sale. The Pepper Pad and Pepper Pad 2 both ran Pepper's proprietary Pepper Keeper application on top of a heavily customized version of the Montavista Linux operating system.

The Pepper Pad 3 was announced in 2006 with as upgrade to a faster AMD Geode processor. The Pepper Pad 3 also used a smaller 7" screen for cost savings. Like previous versions, the Pepper Pad 3 had a split QWERTY button keyboard, built-in microphone, video camera, composite video output, and stereo speakers, infrared receiver and transmitter, 800x480 7 inch LCD touchscreen (with stylus), SD/MMC Flash memory slot, 20 or 30 GB hard disk, 256 MB RAM, 256 KB ROM, and both Wi-Fi (b/g) and Bluetooth 2.0. The Pepper Pad 3 used a heavily customized version of the Fedora Linux operating system called Pepper Linux. Unlike the Pepper Pad 2 which was built and sold directly by Pepper, the Pepper Pad 3 was built and sold under license by Hanbit Electronics.

== Support ==
Pepper Computer, Inc. has ceased operations and is no longer providing support or sales for Pepper Pad web computers or Pepper Linux.

== Software ==
Pepper Pads ran Pepper's "Pepper Keeper" software and suite of applications. Pepper's software was designed to be easy to use, and offered many features later found in devices like the iPhone and Android. The Pepper Keeper's home screen provided large icons for launching applications including a web browser, mail client, chat client, photo viewer, music player, video player, games, and a scrapbooking application. Pepper offered an application store, automatic software updates, and a simple way to share photos, music, and files with friends.

The Pepper Keeper ran atop Pepper Linux, Pepper's custom version of the Linux operating system. Pepper Linux was ported to multiple devices including the One Laptop per Child.

== Software ported to the Pepper Pad ==
- FCE Ultra (NES emulator)
- Adobe Systems/Macromedia Flash 7
- Java
- X11
- GTK+
- Mozilla Firefox
- RealPlayer
- Helix
- Squeak

== Hardware (Pepper Pad 3) ==
- Mass: 2.1 pounds (985g)
- Size: 29 cm x 14.9 cm x 2.3 cm (11.4" x 5.9" x 0.9")

=== Mainboard ===
- AMD Geode CPU, 533 MHz clock speed, x86 instruction set with MMX and 3DNow! extensions, integrated northbridge, graphics controller and PCI bridge
- AMD CS5536 Companion device (southbridge), USB 2.0 / IDE / IR / SMBus / APM interface
- Wolfson WM9713 AC97 Audio / Touchscreen interface
- 256 MB DDR SDRAM (DDR-333 SO-DIMM)
- 256 KB BIOS ROM
- Chrontel CH7013B NTSC/PAL TV signal encoder
- IrDA and TvIR emitters/receivers

=== Subsystems ===
- Hitachi Travelstar 20 GB 1.8" IDE disk drive
- Atheros AR2413A-based mini-PCI 802.11b/g WiFi interface, with externally-attached antenna (external to the card, internal to the Pepper)
- Bluetooth 2.0
- AU Optronics A070VW01 7.0" 800x480 TFT LCD
- Integrated 62-key clicky keyboard, including 4-way cursor array and scroll wheel
- 3800 mAh lithium-ion battery
- stereo speakers
- microphone
- 640x480 digital camera, fixed focus

=== External Ports ===
- USB 2.0 host port
- USB 2.0 device port
- 1/8" stereo headphone out
- 1/8" composite video out
- 1/8" microphone In

=== Internal Ports ===
- miniPCI (occupied by WiFi interface)
- JTAG test-access port.
- Serial port with console

== See also ==
- JooJoo
