= Pleaseeasaur =

American comedic musical act

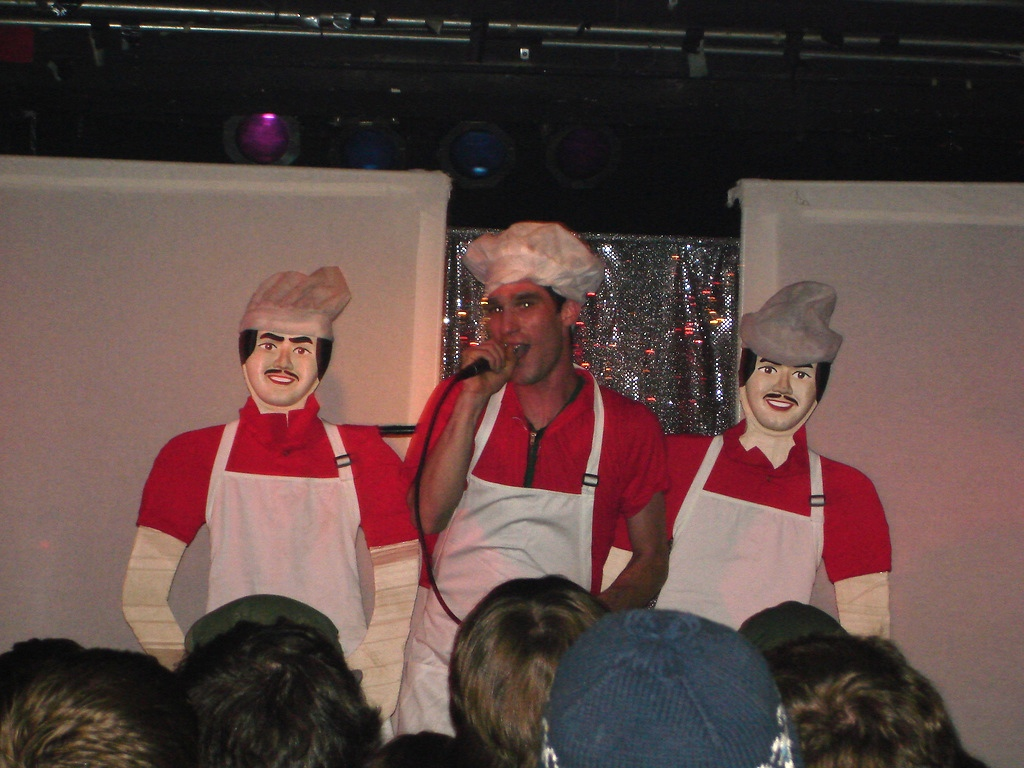
- Pleaseeasaur performing "Pizza Brothers and Sons, Inc."

Background information
- Origin: Seattle, Washington, U.S.
- Genres: Musical comedy
- Years active: 1997–2009
- Labels: Imputor?, Comedy Central
- Members: JP Hasson
- Past members: Thomas Hurley III

Pleaseeasaur (pronounced Please-ee-uh-saur) was an American comedic musical act of JP Hasson (formerly in We’re Not From Idaho and Touch Me Zoo, both with Joe Genaro of The Dead Milkmen). The music was high energy camp style humor with live performances usually including Hasson in many costumes, each coinciding with the song, along with multimedia animations of related images on a large screen. Many Pleaseeasaur songs are commercials for fake companies such as "No Prob Limo", "Pizza Brothers and Sons, Inc." and "Action City News."

Comedy Central in 2006 released the CD/DVD titled The Amazing Adventures of Pleaseeasaur featuring music videos directed by artist TH3 and a cartoon adventure animated by the team responsible for the Adult Swim series Sealab 2021 and Frisky Dingo.

Pleaseeasaur toured internationally during its 12 years, most often with alternative comedian Neil Hamburger as well as with The Black Heart Procession, Boredoms, Buckethead, Man or Astro-Man?, The Melvins, Pinback, The Presidents of the United States of America and others.

Pleaseeasaur disbanded in 2009.

== Discography ==
=== DVDs ===
- The Amazing Adventures Of Pleaseeasaur (DVD) Comedy Central (2006)
- Action Spectacular (DVD) imputor? Records (2005)

=== Albums ===
- The Amazing Adventures Of Pleaseeasaur (CD) Comedy Central (2006)
- The Yellow Pages imputor? Records (2004)
- Pleaseeasaur Int'l Airport V8 Records Australia (2003)
- As Seen On TV imputor? Records (1999)
- Faites Fondre Le Chardon Trezieme (self-released cassette) (1995)

=== EPs ===
- Neil Hamburger/Pleaseeasaur - "Souvenir Record" (tour only 7" with cover art by Mark Mothersbaugh) Million Dollar Performances (2008)
- Beef Flavored Island Razler Records (2001)
