= ManiaTV! =

Digital television network

ManiaTV is a digital television network that produces, packages and distributes premium live celebrity TV shows for the 13-34 youth/young adult market. According to comScore, ManiaTV reaches over 10 million viewers each month. It was founded by Drew Massey.

== History ==
ManiaTV Network launched in 2004 as the world's first Internet television network. In early 2008, ManiaTV moved to Los Angeles, California, from its original base of operations in Denver, Colorado. The move was to place the company closer to the talent and partnerships in the entertainment industry. The new home included a production house with sound stage, allowing many of the shows to be filmed in-house.

The company has worked with every major advertising agency delivering branded entertainment before the term branded entertainment existed. Nearly 100 different advertisers have worked with ManiaTV.

In March 2009, the company was unable to renegotiate a credit facility with Comerica.

On July 10, 2009, the New York Times announced that the founder of ManiaTV, Drew Massey, who had retired to Chairman two years earlier, had raised additional money to buy out the company and relaunch with a focus exclusively on celebrity TV shows. TV veteran Warren Littlefield joined the new company board.

== Programming ==
ManiaTV's youth programming slate has included celebrities, music, action sports, gaming and comedy. Shows include Tom Green Live! and Dave Navarro's Spread TV, Dave Navarro's Dr. Dave, Dave Navarro's Relative Reality, Gastineau Girls' G-Spot TV, The Chuck Norris Show, Stage 5 Live Concerts, The Arcade, Laugh of the Day with the National Lampoon's Lemmings, Top 5, Gameology, Grudge Match, Video Game Report, War Room, All Access, At the Show, Sam's Circle, Truth in Music, Comedy Roadtrip, Hollywood Junket Queen, Jonah Ray's Barbequay and Laugh of the Day.

Founder Drew Massey has announced that several new celebrity-hosted TV shows will launch in the 2009/2010 television season.
