= The Willoughby Tucker Forever Tour =

2025–2026 concert tour by Ethel Cain

- Tour by Ethel Cain
- Promotional poster for the tour
- Location: North America; Europe; Oceania
- Associated album: Willoughby Tucker, I'll Always Love You
- Start date: August 12, 2025
- End date: July 1, 2026
- Legs: 5
- No. of shows: 92
- Supporting acts: 9million • Elliot & Vincent • Wednesday • Vyva Melinkolya • Sarah Morrison • Brighde Chaimbeul • Bar Italia
- Website: www.daughtersofcain.com/tour

Ethel Cain concert chronology
- The Childish Behaviour Tour (2024); The Willoughby Tucker Forever Tour (2025)

The Willoughby Tucker Forever Tour was the fourth concert tour by American singer-songwriter and record producer Ethel Cain, in support of her second studio album, Willoughby Tucker, I'll Always Love You (2025). Set to include 92 shows, the tour began in Seattle, United States, on August 12, 2025, and is set to conclude in Hamburg, Germany, on July 1, 2026. The band 9million was announced to serve as a supporting act for all the 2025 shows.

== Background ==
On March 24, 2025, Cain announced her second studio album, Willoughby Tucker, I'll Always Love You, via social media. At the same time, she revealed that she would be embarking on an accompanying concert tour, the Willoughby Tucker Forever Tour. She announced that the band 9million would be the supporting artist for all shows, following the band opening for her at two shows in the Blood Stained Blonde Tour. This tour follows The Childish Behaviour Tour (2024), which served to promote her 2022 album Preacher's Daughter and tease then-upcoming songs from her 2025 project Perverts. On August 11, Cain announced six shows in Australia and New Zealand. On September 26, 2025, Cain announced new European shows scheduled to take place in 2026. On October 6, 2025, Cain further expanded the tour by adding new North American shows scheduled to take place in 2026. 9million is also set to be the opening act for those dates.

== Setlist ==
This is the setlist of the opening night of the show in Seattle on August 12, 2025. It is not indicative of the setlist of all shows.

1. "Willoughby's Theme"
2. "Janie"
3. "Fuck Me Eyes"
4. "Nettles"
5. "Willoughby's Interlude"
6. "Dust Bowl"
7. "Vacillator" (Containing elements of "Perverts" and "Housofpsychoticwomn")
8. "Onanist" (Containing elements of "Pulldrone")
9. "A Knock at the Door"
10. "Radio Towers"
11. "Tempest"
12. "Waco, Texas"
  Encore
13. "A House in Nebraska"
14. "Crush"
15. "American Teenager"

Alterations

- During the second Seattle show, Cain performed "Misuse Oh" in place of "A Knock at the Door". She also performed "Thoroughfare" during the encore, replacing "A House in Nebraska", whilst a snippet of the song is sung during the piano encore of "Waco, Texas". She plays this variation of the setlist every other night.
- During the Troutdale show, Cain performed the same Alterations as Seattle Night 2, However "Tempest" was cut short due to a medical issue in the crowd, and "American Teenager" was cut.
- During the Berkeley show, Cain performed "Punish" with Chelsea Wolfe before A Knock at the Door. Punish has been played at some shows since, but without Chelsea Wolfe.
- During the Boston show, Cain was joined by Jae Matthews of Boy Harsher during her performance of "Vacillator".
- During the second Toronto show, Cain did not play "Waco, Texas", "Thoroughfare", or "Crush".
- During the fourth and fifth London show, Cain performed "Sun Bleached Flies" as the closing song of the set.
- During the first Paris show, Cain left the stage mid-way through "Nettles". The show was then announced to be cancelled.
- From the second Paris show onwards, Cain has replaced "Waco, Texas" on the setlist with "Sun Bleached Flies".
- During the Vienna show, Cain played "Family Tree" during the encore, in place of "A House in Nebraska".
- During the Warsaw show, Cain played "Ptolemaea" as the first song of the encore.
- During the show in Auckland on 2/13, "Sunday Morning", "Punish Demo II", "Ptolemaea", and "Gibson Girl" were added to the setlist. "A House In Nebraska" and "Thoroughfare" were played as an encore.
- After the show in Auckland, "Waco, Texas" was cut from the setlist

== Shows ==
Date (2025)	City	Country	Venue	Opening Act
August 12	Seattle	United States	Paramount Theatre	9million
August 13	Seattle	United States	Paramount Theatre	9million
August 15	Vancouver	Canada	Queen Elizabeth Theatre	9million
August 16	Troutdale (Note: Promoted as Portland.)	United States	McMenamins Edgefield	9million
August 18	Berkeley	United States	Greek Theatre	9million
August 20	Los Angeles	United States	Shrine Auditorium and Expo Hall	9million
August 21	Los Angeles	United States	Shrine Auditorium and Expo Hall	9million
August 22	Phoenix	United States	Arizona Financial Theatre	9million
August 24	Dallas	United States	The Bomb Factory	9million
August 25	Houston	United States	713 Music Hall	9million
August 26	Austin	United States	Moody Amphitheater at Waterloo Park	9million
August 28	Atlanta	United States	The Eastern	9million
August 29	Atlanta	United States	The Eastern	9million
August 30	Asheville	United States	Asheville Yards	9million
September 2	Pelham	United States	The Caverns	9million
September 4	Pittsburgh	United States	Stage AE	9million
September 5	Washington, D.C.	United States	The Anthem	9million
September 6	Philadelphia	United States	Metropolitan Opera House	9million
September 9	New York City	United States	Radio City Music Hall	9million
September 10	Brooklyn	United States	Kings Theatre	9million
September 12	Boston	United States	Roadrunner	9million
September 13	Buffalo	United States	Outer Harbor Live at Terminal B	9million
September 15	Toronto	Canada	Queen Elizabeth Theatre	9million
September 16	Toronto	Canada	Queen Elizabeth Theatre	9million
September 17	Detroit	United States	Masonic Temple Theatre	9million
September 19	Saint Paul	United States	Palace Theatre	9million
September 20	Chicago	United States	The Salt Shed	9million
October 2	Manchester	England	O_{2} Apollo	9million
October 3	Manchester	England	O_{2} Apollo	9million
October 4	Glasgow	Scotland	O_{2} Academy	9million
October 6	London	England	Eventim Apollo	9million
October 7	London	England	Eventim Apollo	9million
October 9	London	England	Eventim Apollo	9million
October 10	London	England	Eventim Apollo	9million
October 11	London	England	Eventim Apollo	9million
October 14	Brussels	Belgium	Ancienne Belgique	9million
October 15	Utrecht	Netherlands	TivoliVredenburg	9million
October 16	Utrecht	Netherlands	TivoliVredenburg	9million
October 19	Paris	France	Olympia	9million
October 21	Cologne	Germany	Carlswerk Victoria	9million
October 23	Berlin	Germany	Tempodrom (Note: The October 23, 2025 show in Berlin was originally scheduled to take place at Huxley's Neue Welt.)	9million
October 24	Hamburg	Germany	Docks	9million
October 25	Copenhagen	Denmark	Vega	9million
October 27	Oslo	Norway	Sentrum Scene	9million
October 28	Stockholm	Sweden	Fållan	9million
October 31	Warsaw	Poland	Stodoła	9million
November 1	Prague	Czech Republic	Velký sál Lucerna (Note: The November 1, 2025 show in Prague was originally scheduled to take place at Roxy.)	9million
November 2	Vienna	Austria	Raiffeisen Halle Gasometer	9million
November 4	Zurich	Switzerland	X-tra	9million
November 5	Milan	Italy	Alcatraz	9million
November 7	Barcelona	Spain	Razzmatazz	9million
November 8	Madrid	Spain	Teatro Eslava	9million
November 9	Lisbon	Portugal	LAV Warehouse	9million

Date (2026)	City	Country	Venue	Opening Act
February 13	Auckland	New Zealand	Auckland Town Hall	Elliot & Vincent
February 14	Auckland	New Zealand	Auckland Town Hall	Elliot & Vincent
February 16	Melbourne	Australia	Palais Theatre	Elliot & Vincent
February 17	Melbourne	Australia	Palais Theatre	Elliot & Vincent
February 18	Melbourne	Australia	Palais Theatre	Elliot & Vincent
February 21	Sydney	Australia	The Hordern Pavilion	Elliot & Vincent
February 22	Sydney	Australia	The Hordern Pavilion	Elliot & Vincent
February 25	Brisbane	Australia	Fortitude Music Hall	Elliot & Vincent
February 25	Brisbane	Australia	Fortitude Music Hall	Elliot & Vincent
February 28	Fremantle	Australia	Fremantle Arts Centre	Elliot & Vincent
April 10 (Note: The concerts on April 10 and April 17, 2026, are a part of the Coachella Valley Music and Arts Festival.)	Indio	United States	Empire Polo Club	—N/a
April 14	San Diego	United States	The Rady Shell at Jacobs Park	9million Wednesday
April 15	Paradise (Note: Labeled as Las Vegas in promotion material.)	United States	The Theater at Virgin Hotels	9million
April 17	Indio	United States	Empire Polo Club	—N/a
April 19	Magna	United States	Saltair	9million
April 21	Morrison (Note: Labeled as Denver in promotion material.)	United States	Red Rocks Amphitheatre	9million
April 23	Omaha	United States	The Astro Amphitheater	9million
April 24	Milwaukee	United States	Miller High Life Theatre	9million
April 25	Newport (Note: Labeled as Cincinnati in promotion material.)	United States	MegaCorp Pavilion	9million
April 28	Chesterfield (Note: Labeled as St. Louis in promotion material.)	United States	The Factory	9million
April 29	Louisville	United States	Iroquois Amphitheater	9million Vyva Melinkolya
May 1	Franklin	United States	FirstBank Amphitheater	9million
May 2	Huntsville	United States	Orion Amphitheater	9million
May 5	Tallahassee	United States	The Moon	9million Sarah Morrison
May 6	Tallahassee	United States	The Moon	9million Sarah Morrison
May 8	St. Augustine	United States	St. Augustine Amphitheatre	9million Sarah Morrison
May 9	Miami Beach	United States	The Fillmore Miami Beach	9million Sarah Morrison
May 11	New Orleans	United States	Orpheum Theater	9million
May 12	New Orleans	United States	Orpheum Theater	9million
May 14	Tulsa	United States	Cain's Ballroom	9million
May 15	Tulsa	United States	Cain's Ballroom	9million
May 16	Tulsa	United States	Cain's Ballroom	9million
June 2-4 (Note: The concert on June 2-4, 2026, is a part of Primavera Sound.)	Barcelona	Spain	Parc del Fòrum	—N/a
June 13	Luxembourg City	Luxembourg	Den Atelier	—N/a
June 16	Cologne	Germany	Tanzbrunnen	Brìghde Chaimbeul
June 19	Cardiff	Wales	Cardiff Castle	Bar Italia
June 20	Halifax	England	Piece Hall	Bar Italia
June 23	Birmingham	England	O_{2} Academy Birmingham	Brighde Chaimbeul
June 27	Dublin	Ireland	Fairview Park	Brighde Chaimbeul
June 28	Edinburgh	Scotland	Usher Hall	Brighde Chaimbeul
July 1	Hamburg	Germany	Stadtpark Open Air	Brighde Chaimbeul

=== Cancelled dates ===
List of cancelled dates, showing date, city, country, venue and reason of cancellation
Date (2025)	City	Country	Venue	Reason
October 18	Paris	France	Olympia	Unforeseen circumstances
