= Oh No (Xiu Xiu album) =

Studio album by Xiu Xiu
- Released: March 26, 2021
- Studio: Nurse (Jamie Stewart's home studio in Los Angeles)
- Genres: Indie rock; experimental rock; art pop
- Length: 53:40
- Label: Polyvinyl
- Producers: Lawrence English; Greg Saunier; Angela Seo

Xiu Xiu chronology
Girl with Basket of Fruit (2019)	Oh No (2021)	Ignore Grief (2023)

Singles from Oh No
- 1. "A Bottle of Rum" Released: January 27, 2021; 2. "Rumpus Room" Released: March 4, 2021

Oh No (stylized in all caps) is the twelfth studio album by American experimental band Xiu Xiu. It was released on March 26, 2021, via Polyvinyl. It is described as a "duets album". Its lead single, "A Bottle of Rum" featuring Liz Harris was released on January 27, 2021.

== Background ==
Oh No is made up entirely of duets. It was announced along with the release of its lead single on January 27, 2021.

== Composition ==
According to frontrunner Jamie Stewart, the features on the album reflect people that helped them realize that the "ratio of beautiful humans to shitty humans is more like 60/40", rather than what [they] had always assumed was "1/99". They also explained that the album's lead single was inspired by Grouper's "Heavy Water/I’d Rather Be Sleeping".

== Critical reception ==
Professional ratings
Aggregate scores
Source	Rating
AnyDecentMusic?	67/100
Metacritic	75/100
Review scores
Source	Rating
AllMusic	4/5 stars
Beats Per Minute	69%
Clash	8/10
DIY	4/5 stars
The Line of Best Fit	8/10
musicOMH	4.5/5 stars
Paste	6.9/10
Pitchfork	7.0/10
The Skinny	3/5 stars
Uncut	7/10

Oh No received positive reviews from critics. On Metacritic, it holds a score of 75/100 out of 12 reviews, indicating "generally favorable reviews". In particular, A Bottle of Rum featuring Liz Harris was well received by critics. The track has been called an "electro-pop stunner", and one of the best songs of the week. Writing for Mxdwn, Aaron Grech claimed that the indie pop track "blends Xiu Xiu's eclectic chord progressions and vocal styles, with Harris’ more spacious vocals and lo-fi ambiance".

Reviewing the album for AllMusic, Heather Phares wrote how the album was, "Embodying hard times as well as the way friends lift each other out of them, Oh No also exemplifies the drama, mystery, and deeply felt emotions that have made Xiu Xiu a vital musical force for decades." In the assessment for musicOMH, Matt Costell felt that by, "Embracing the participatory rather than lurking in personal mistrust, and supplementing their formerly disconsolate narratives with unusually contented flourishes, these diverse new manifestations substantially demonstrate that Xiu Xiu still exist in a universe of their own design, but that maybe they’re ready to temporarily negotiate ours once more." In the review for Pitchfork, Brian Howe highlighted the album's accessibility; " By not trying to shock us, Stewart actually surprises us, and OH NO makes it easier to be a Xiu Xiu fan than it’s been in years."

Writing for The Skinny, Tony Inglis was more critical in his review of the album, claiming that "The production is exceptionally murky – mostly collaborators move through the dark, uncertain world Stewart manifests with [their] Scott Walker-like crooning of glossolalia." Clare Martin also shared similar sentiments in the review for Paste, stating that "Xiu Xiu’s esoteric lyrics and challenging, textured sounds are part of what make them so singular as a group, but can also be overdone. OH NO’s moving moments of catharsis and uplifting hope are muted by how exhaustingly over-the-top the rest of the album feels."

== Track listing ==
All songs written by Angela Seo and Jamie Stewart, except where noted, and produced by Seo, Lawrence English and Greg Saunier.

No.	Title	Writer(s)	Length
1.	"Sad Mezcalita" (featuring Sharon van Etten)		4:00
2.	"I Cannot Resist" (featuring Drab Majesty)		3:30
3.	"The Grifters" (featuring Haley Fohr)		3:12
4.	"Goodbye for Good" (featuring Greg Saunier)		4:17
5.	"Oh No" (featuring Susanne Sachsse)		2:37
6.	"Rumpus Room" (featuring Liars)		3:44
7.	"Fuzz Gong Fight" (featuring Angela Seo)		3:47
8.	"I Dream of Someone Else Entirely" (featuring Owen Pallett)		2:54
9.	"One Hundred Years" (featuring Chelsea Wolfe)	Simon Gallup; Lol Tolhurst; Robert Smith	6:26
10.	"A Classic Screw" (featuring Fabrizio Modonese Palumbo)		3:19
11.	"It Bothers Me All The Time" (featuring Shearwater)		5:28
12.	"Saint Dymphna" (featuring Twin Shadow)		4:04
13.	"Knock Out" (featuring Alice Bag)		2:56
14.	"A Bottle of Rum" (featuring Liz Harris)		3:11
15.	"Ants" (featuring Valerie Diaz)		0:15
Total length:			53:40

Notes

- "Oh No" and "Ants" are stylized in all caps.
- "One Hundred Years" is a cover version of The Cure song featured on their 1982 album Pornography.

== Personnel ==
Credits adapted from Tidal.

Xiu Xiu

- Jamie Stewart – autoharp, bajo quinto, banjo, bass guitar, design, drums, engineer, guitar, mandolin, organ, percussion, sampling, stylophone, synthesizer, viola, vocals, xylophone
- Angela Seo – design, gong, harmonium, percussion, piano, producer, synthesizer bass, vocals

Additional personnel

- Jonathan Meiburg – animal sounds, vocals
- Greg Saunier – bass guitar, cymbals, engineer, guitar, producer, sampling, synthesizer, vocals
- Charlie Looker – bass guitar, guitar
- David Kendrick – bongos, drums, percussion
- Danelle Abad – design
- Jherek Bischoff – double bass
- Zachary Dawes – double bass, bass guitar
- Angus Andrew – engineer, vocals
- Ben Chisholm – engineer
- Brandon Jay – engineer
- Dan Duszynski – engineer
- Dirk Dresselhaus – engineer
- Justin Higgins – engineer
- Owen Pallett – engineer, vocals
- Paul Beauchamp – engineer
- Haley Fohr – engineer, vocals
- Twin Shadow – engineer, saxophone, vocals
- Alan Douches – mastering
- John Congleton – Optigan, synthesizer
- Lawrence English – producer
- Alice Bag – vocals
- Deb Demure – vocals
- Fabrizio Modonese Palumbo – vocals
- Gwendolyn Sanford – vocals
- Liz Harris – vocals
- Sharon Van Etten – vocals
- Susanne Sachsse – vocals
- Valerie Diaz – vocals
