= Luckyhorse Industries =

Independent record label from Seattle, Washington

- Founded: 2001
- Founder: James Bertram
- Genre: Punk, indie rock
- Country of origin: U.S.
- Location: Seattle, Washington
- Official website: www.luckyhorseindustries.com

Luckyhorse Industries is an independent record label and producer of music related artifacts and art, established in Seattle, Washington in 2001 by musician James Bertram. Bertram has played guitar, bass, and keyboards with Lync, Built to Spill, Beck, Red Stars Theory, Pennsy's Electric Workhorses, 764-Hero, and Amy Blaschke. Luckyhorse works with Modest Mouse, The Fleet Foxes, The Fiery Furnaces, Tiny Vipers, The Cave Singers, Love as Laughter, The Murder City Devils, Minus the Bear, and The Blood Brothers.

== Roster ==
- Arthur & Yu
- The Blood Brothers
- Chris Brokaw
- The Cave Singers
- Cold Lake
- The Electrical Guitar Company
- The Fiery Furnaces
- Fleet Foxes
- Flexions
- Frog Eyes
- Gold Leaves
- Damien Jurado
- Love as Laughter/Sam Jayne
- Minus the Bear
- Modest Mouse
- Mudhoney
- Murder City Devils
- Naomi Punk
- Night Canopy/Amy Blaschke
- Old Jail by Spencer Moody
- Paper Tiger
- Past Lives
- Red Stars Theory
- The Sorts
- Tiny Vipers
- Triumph of Lethargy
- Ugly Casanova
- Unnatural Helpers
- Vells
- Verellen Amplifiers
- Whalebones
- Winfred E Eye

== Discography ==
- LI019 Triumph of Lethargy, Old Jail CD, 2008
- LI018 Tiny Vipers, Empire Prism CD, 2008
- LI017 Whalebones, Morning Man CD, 2008
- LI016 Tiny Vipers, Tiny Vipers EP CD, 2007
- LI015 Sam Jayne, The Supernatural Sessions CD, 2005
- LI014 Vells, In the Hours, 7inch, 2004
- LI013 Amy Blaschke, S/T CD, 2003
- LI012 Winfred E Eye, The Dirt Tier CD & LP, 2003
- LI011 FCS North CD & LP, Vocabulary, 2003
- LI010 Vells, Vells EP CD, 2003
- LI009 Minus The Bear, Highly Refined Pirates LP, 2002 (CD on Suicide Squeeze Records)
- LI008 The Sorts, Six Plus CD, 2002 (split release with After Hours Japan)
- LI007 FCS North, All Mvmnt Brings BONUS 7", 2002 (CD on Pacifico Records)
- LI006 FCS North, All Mvmnt Brings LP, 2002 (CD on Pacifico Records)
- LI005 Plan B, Like A Ship Sailing CD & LP, 2002
- LI004 Winfred E. Eye, The Day I Lost My Sea Legs CD & LP, 2002 (UNRELEASED)
- LI003 Winfred E Eye, A Bottle, A Dog, Some Milk, A Bottle CD & LP, 2002
- LI002 Love As Laughter, Sea To Shining Sea 2xLP, 2001(CD on Sub Pop Records)
- LI001 The Blood Brothers, Rumors Laid Waste CD, 2001 (vinyl on Sound Virus)

== Sources ==
- Seattle Weekly article
- West Coast Performer article
- Stranger article
