= Punish (song) =

2024 single by Ethel Cain

Single by Ethel Cain

from the album Perverts
- Released: November 1, 2024
- Genre: Folk; drone; ambient; slowcore
- Length: 6:47 (single version); 6:40 (album version)
- Label: Daughters of Cain
- Songwriter: Hayden Silas Anhedönia
- Producer: Ethel Cain

Ethel Cain singles chronology
"For Sure" (2024)	"Punish" (2024)	"Nettles" (2025)

Music video
- "Punish" on YouTube

"Punish" is a song by the American singer-songwriter and record producer Ethel Cain, from her studio recording Perverts (2025). She released it through her own record label Daughters of Cain on November 1, 2024, as the project's lead single. She wrote, produced, recorded, and mixed the track, while Dale Becker mastered it. "Punish" is a folk, drone, ambient, and slowcore track with industrial influences. Containing experimental production, the song is led by piano and presents guitars as it gradually builds to a crescendo. Lyrically, it deals with an exploration of shame, portraying a pedophile and child molester shot by his victim's father.

Cain and Silken Weinberg directed the accompanying black-and-white music video for "Punish", which premiered on the same date as the single's release. Music critics received the song positively, many of whom considered it a strong introduction to Perverts. Commercially, it appeared on the New Zealand Hot Singles chart. Prior to its release, Cain included "Punish" in the set list for the Childish Behaviour Tour (2024).

== Background and release ==
Following the release of her debut studio album, Preacher's Daughter (2022), Ethel Cain began to work on a side project rather than its follow-up. In 2024, she developed the studio recording Perverts in Coraopolis, Pennsylvania, and Tallahassee, Florida. Initially, it was a concept album on which she "would have explored a different character that society considers a pervert on each song", according to Stereogum's Brad Sanders. However, the idea was partly scrapped and only two of the tracks written for the first concept were included on the final track listing, including "Punish".

On October 14, 2024, Cain announced the release of Perverts and its lead single "Punish", after teasing visuals on social media with grainy and black-and-white pictures. She also shared the cover artwork for the single, which features Cain with a ring above her head. Her own record label Daughters of Cain, which serves as an imprint of Prescription Songs, released it on November 1, 2024, along with an accompanying dark, black-and-white music video directed by Cain and Silken Weinberg. On November 11, Cain revealed the track listing for Perverts, which includes "Punish" as the second song. Commercially, it entered the New Zealand Hot Singles chart issued for November 8, 2024, at number 29.

== Composition ==
The single version of "Punish" is 6 minutes and 47 seconds long, while the version included on Perverts is 7 seconds shorter. Cain wrote, produced, recorded, and mixed the track, while Dale Becker was in charge of its mastering. Angel Diaz, also known as Vyva Melinkolya, played baritone and lap steel guitars. Critics have identified it as a folk, drone, slowcore, and ambient song, with elements of industrial music. Its production is in line with the project's more experimental and texture-driven style than her previous releases. Led by a slow tempo piano instrumental, the track incorporates guitars as it gradually builds to a crescendo, which is reminiscent of shoegaze. The distorted chords accompany Cain's whispered vocals. The track also incorporates the sound of a rusted swing set recorded at midnight, which Clare Martin of Paste considered as a reference to childhood.

The sound of "Punish" was the subject of comparisons to various artists. Pitchfork's Meaghan Garvey saw it reminiscent to Ruins (2014) by the musician Grouper, as well as the works of the singer-songwriter Midwife, who describes her music as "heaven metal". The Independent's Helen Brown compared it to the late-1990s ballads by the singer-songwriter Sarah McLachlan, and The Fader's David Renshaw interpreted it as a mix between Grouper and the singer Lana Del Rey. Additionally, Sanders drew similarities between the piano progressions of "Punish" and "Horizon" (2017), a song by the indie folk singer-songwriter Aldous Harding.

"Punish" is one of the tracks on Perverts with more focus on the lyrical content. A murder ballad, it is an exploration of shame, portraying a pedophile and child molester who self-harms after he was shot by his victim's father. According to Cain, he tries to "simulate the bullet wound" on his body. However, she stated that it could be freely interpreted. The song references Gary Plauché, a man who killed his son's rapist, Jeffrey Doucet. In a press release regarding the song, Cain stated: "I wonder how deep shame can run, and how unforgivable an act could be that I may still justify it in some bent way to make carrying it more bearable. Would I tell myself it's not my fault and I couldn’t help myself? Would anyone truly believe that? Would I?".

== Critical reception ==
Music critics praised "Punish" as a strong introduction to Perverts. In a five-star review, NME's Kristen S. Hé compared it to "sinking into an ice bath" and said that the lyrics' "vagueness only makes them more unnerving". Writing for Clash, Robin Murray opined that the song "illustrates how gripping, and how emotionally redolent her work can be", and that it "acts as musical therapy, stripping away the layers of dirt on her life". Sasha Geffen of Pitchfork praised Cain's vocal performance on the track as an improvement from her previous releases, and Grant Sharples of Uproxx believed that she expressed the same sincerity and "deep conviction in herself and her art" as she did on Preacher's Daughter. Numerous publications added "Punish" to their lists of the best new music of its release week. (Note: Namely, Rolling Stone, Paper, The New York Times, and Stereogum.) "Punish" was ranked at number 19 on Dazed's listicle of the best tracks released in 2024; Serena Smith called the song "bleak but beautiful". The Los Angeles Times considered it the 28th best song of 2024; August Smith wrote, "'American Teenager' was an all-timer, but is it bad to say that it's nice to have Cain back and sounding absolutely miserable?". Billboard named it one of the best LGBTQ pride songs of the year; Joe Lynch wrote that it is not "something complete and definite" as other slow-building songs. In reviews of Perverts, critics believed that "Punish" is one of the most conventional tracks on the project.

== Live performances ==
Cain debuted "Punish" prior to its release at Le Trianon in Paris on June 3, 2024, as part of the set list for her third concert tour, the Childish Behaviour Tour. The Fader's Sandra Song described the performance as exquisite, slow-moving, and "full of pensive melancholy", while Stereogum's Tom Breihan said it was "long and meditative".

== Charts ==
Chart performance for "Punish"
Chart (2024)	Peak position
New Zealand Hot Singles (RMNZ)	29
