= Remembering the Fireballs (Part 8) =

Compilation album by Lync
- Released: August 26, 1997
- Recorded: tracks 1–5 recorded by Pat Maley @ yo yo capitol in early 1993, tracks 6–12 recorded by Tim Green @ the red house in late 1993, track 13 recorded by Phil Ek @ john & stu's place mid 1994, track 14 recorded live @ gilman mid 1994
- Genre: Post-hardcore, indie rock, lo-fi
- Length: 58:11
- Label: K Records
- Producer: James Bertram, Pat Maley

Lync chronology
| These Are Not Fall Colors (1994) | Remembering the Fireballs (Part 8) (1997) |

Professional ratings
Review scores
| Source | Rating |
|---|---|
| Allmusic | 4/5 stars |

Remembering the Fireballs (Part 8) is a compilation album by the American post-hardcore group Lync. It is composed of singles and unreleased tracks. The album was released on K Records in 1997.

== Track listing ==
All tracks are written by Lync.

| No. | Title | Length |
|---|---|---|
| 1. | "Pigeons" | 5:59 |
| 2. | "Friend" | 5:14 |
| 3. | "Hands and Knees" | 4:36 |
| 4. | "Electricity" | 2:47 |
| 5. | "Pathetic" | 2:50 |
| 6. | "Two Feet in Front" | 4:18 |
| 7. | "Mhz" | 4:08 |
| 8. | "Pan" | 2:47 |
| 9. | "Pennies to Save" | 4:34 |
| 10. | "Firestarter" | 6:18 |
| 11. | "Turtle" | 4:15 |
| 12. | "Lightbulb Switch" | 2:09 |
| 13. | "Can't Tie Yet" | 3:11 |
| 14. | "The Last Song" | 4:56 |

== Personnel ==
=== Lync ===
- Sam Jayne – vocals, guitar
- James Bertram – bass guitar, vocals, mixing
- Dave Schneider – drums

=== Other musical personnel ===
- Tim Green - moog synthesizer on "Can't Tie Yet"
- John Atkins - guitar on "Can't Tie Yet"

=== Production ===
- Pat Maley - recording (tracks 1–5), mixing
- Tim Green - recording (tracks 6–12)
- Phil Ek - recording (track 13)
