= A I A: Alien Observer =

Studio album by Grouper
- Released: April 11, 2011
- Genre: Ambient
- Length: 39:07
- Label: Yellow Electric
- Producer: Liz Harris

Grouper chronology
A I A: Dream Loss (2011)	A I A: Alien Observer (2011)	Violet Replacement (2012)

Singles from A I A: Alien Observer
- 1. "Alien Observer" Released: March 29, 2011

A I A: Alien Observer is the seventh studio album by American musician Liz Harris, under the stage name Grouper. It was released on April 11, 2011, through Harris' record label, Yellow Electric. It is the second part of her two-part album series A I A, with the first being its companion album A I A: Dream Loss, simultaneously released on the same day. The album consists of songs recorded over a few years, written after Harris had gone through a breakup and quit her full-time job.

A I A: Alien Observer is a work of ambient compositions which marks a total shift from the style of her breakthrough album Dragging a Dead Deer Up a Hill (2008), making it sound reminiscent of her previous albums, with incorporations of drone music and tape manipulations. The album's title track "Alien Observer" was released as its lead single on March 29, prior to the album's release, with a music video being released on April 18. The album was met with positive reviews from music critics, with some complimenting Harris' experimentation throughout, additionally calling it more accessible than its companion album, A I A: Dream Loss.

== Background and recording ==
In 2008, American musician Liz Harris released her fifth studio album under her solo project, Grouper, Dragging a Dead Deer Up a Hill (2008), which became her breakthrough album. She was also an opening act for Animal Collective's sold-out show in Los Angeles, on May 29, 2009, which also led to Harris gaining more attention and confidence in performing live. At around this time, Harris also maintained a difficult full-time job and had almost no spare time to record any material as a result. A while later, she quit her job and had gone through a breakup, additionally moving into a "shitty" apartment in where she spent months recording songs and listening to draft recordings in her basement.

In January 2011, Harris announced that she would be independently releasing two studio albums in April of the same year. Collectively, the two albums are part of the album compilation A I A, with the first album being titled Dream Loss and the other titled Alien Observer. According to Harris, the latter was recorded after the former, which was written before "a hard time". The albums' recording processes were different from that of her previous studio albums, which were usually done in a matter of weeks. By creating these albums, she again became familiar with what she wanted to explore in music, including "unseen movements and connections between people and spaces".

== Music ==
A I A: Alien Observer has been categorized as mainly a work of ambient compositions, reminiscent of Harris' earlier works such as Wide (2006) and Cover the Windows and the Walls (2007). The album leans away from clearer acoustic guitar arrangements that Dragging a Dead Deer Up a Hill mainly relied on, instead shifting its musical focus on repetitive and progressive compositions with undertones of drone, lo-fi, psychedelia, and tape music. It is the second part of her album series A I A, with A I A: Dream Loss being the first. Harris' layered vocals throughout have been compared to those of Julianna Barwick, though "comparatively distant and less immersive".

The album's opening track, "Moon Is Sharp", consists of combined elements such as warm vocal drones, distortion, reverb, and tape loops. It was referred to as a "gothic, choral siren song" by Jeff Terich of Treble. The "liturgical" title track, "Alien Observer" is a song where Harris' lyrics are more audible, seeing herself as an "alien observer" in a world she does not belong in, including this theme into the chorus, "Gonna take a spaceship / Fly back to the stars". The song incorporates less effects, relying solely on a backing "tremolo-sounding" electric keyboard that leans away from drone music and adapts as a pop song. "Vapor Trails" is a lullaby-like track that further demonstrates the album's dark tone. The song uses a sufficient amount of echo and reverb onto soft guitar slides heard throughout.

"She Loves Me That Way" has a sound and tone similar to "Vapor Trails", featuring an echoed guitar and noise, with undertones of garage rock. Kevin Lozano of Pitchfork praised Harris' vocals on the track, stating that they sound "like some astral lodestar". "(Second Heart Tone)" is a short piece that consists of an amplified music box melody with noise elements of cars driving down a highway. This serves as used a transition into "Mary, On the Wall (for Bette Jackson)", which was described by Heather Phares of AllMusic as "a symphony of velvety textures". The closing track, "Come Softly (For Daniel Dalzell)" only features Harris' voice and an electric keyboard, as well as constant music pauses, collectively described as elements which "gradually disappear over the horizon" by Mark Richardson of Pitchfork.

== Release ==
A I A: Alien Observer was independently released through Harris' label Yellow Electric on April 11, 2011, on vinyl and for digital download. It is the second part of her A I A album series, with the first being A I A: Dream Loss, which was also released on the same day. Before the album's release, the title track "Alien Observer" was issued for streaming on March 29. An official video for the track, which was directed by Hamish Parkinson, was released on April 18. On October 25, 2019, the album was reissued on vinyl by Kranky, with its packaging featuring photography by Sarah Meadows and tracklist inserts.

== Critical reception ==
Professional ratings
Review scores
Source	Rating
AllMusic	(Note: Score is shared with A I A: Dream Loss.)
Beats Per Minute	81%
Pitchfork	8.1/10
Tiny Mix Tapes	4.5/5 marks

A I A: Alien Observer received positive reviews from music critics. Mark Richardson of Pitchfork considered it "more accessible" than its companion album A I A: Dream Loss, but also likened the overall sound of both albums to Harris' earlier albums, such as Cover the Windows and the Walls (2008). Josh Becker of Beats Per Minute complimented Harris' desire to experiment with "her signature hazy sound" throughout the album, which makes it and its companion album "such a revelation".

Reviewing A I A: Alien Observer for its tenth anniversary, Irina Shtreis of Louder Than War praised it as a thoughtful release and "an attempt to look at one's own feelings from a distance". Daniel Bromfield of Spectrum Culture called it "airy and melodic", and felt that the album should be listened to after A I A: Dream Loss as a series. Matthew Horne of Tiny Mix Tapes also suggested this listening method, additionally naming both albums Harris' best projects to date. Heather Phares of AllMusic called it a "completely entrancing" experience, praising Harris' instrumentation shifts throughout.

A I A: Alien Observer received an honorable mention on Pitchfork's list of the best albums of 2011. In 2016, Pitchfork ranked Alien Observer at number 21 on its list of the 50 best ambient albums of all time, with staff writer Kevin Lozano stating that "Alien Observer feels material and visceral, but it retains her sense of mystery and emotional resonance." In 2021, Jeff Terich of Treble listed it as an accessible album for first-time listeners of Harris' catalog, calling it a "deeply beautiful and strange album that echoes what its title suggests: extraterrestrial wonder."

== Track listing ==
All tracks are written by Liz Harris.

No.	Title	Length
1.	"Moon Is Sharp"	6:49
2.	"Alien Observer"	3:57
3.	"Vapor Trails"	9:05
4.	"She Loves Me That Way"	8:34
5.	"(second heart tone)"	1:22
6.	"Mary, On the Wall (for Bette Jackson)"	4:45
7.	"Come Softly (for Daniel Dalzell)"	4:34
Total length:		39:07

Notes

- On digital versions of the album, "(second heart tone)" and "Mary, On the Wall (for Bette Jackson)" are combined as one track, being titled as "Mary On the Wall (Second Heart Tone)" and having a combined length of 6:07 instead.
