= Get Here and Stay =

Studio album by 764-HERO
- Released: October 20, 1998
- Recorded: June 1998 at Bob Lang Studios and Avast! "Typo" March 1998 at The Good, The Bad, The Ugly
- Genre: Emo, indie rock, alternative rock
- Label: Up Records
- Producer: Phil Ek

764-HERO chronology
Salt Sinks and Sugar Floats (1996)	Get Here and Stay (1998)	Weekends of Sound (2000)

Professional ratings
Review scores
Source	Rating
AllMusic	4/5 stars
Pitchfork	7.8/10

Get Here and Stay is the second full-length album by the American indie rock band 764-HERO. The album was released on Up Records in 1998.

== Critical reception ==
Spin deemed the album "a cool glass of lo-fi." The Times Colonist called it "feedback-drenched guitar chords and some of the most pained, emotive vocals to come out of Seattle in years."

The Fort Worth Star-Telegram listed the album as one of the best of 1998, considering it "modest, guitar-driven love songs." The Seattle Times thought that "Polly Johnson's casual, understated drum playing should be studied by every rock drummer who equates 'loud' with 'good'."

== Track listing ==
1. "Loaded Painted Red"
2. "History Lessons"
3. "Ward's Country"
4. "Calendar Pages"
5. "Ottawa Dropout"
6. "Watch the Silverware"
7. "Get Alone"
8. "Typo"
9. "Stained Glass"
10. "Coastline"

== Personnel ==
- John Atkins—vocals, guitar, keyboards
- Polly Johnson—drums, percussion
- James Bertram—bass, guitar, keyboards

=== Additional ===
- Ward Johnson—organ (9), piano (10)
- Phil Ek—producer
- Kip Beelman—recorded track 8
- Jesse LeDoux—design
