= Life on Earth (Tiny Vipers album) =

Studio album by Tiny Vipers
- Released: July 7, 2009 (CD, Digital); November 16, 2009 (Vinyl)
- Length: 65:31
- Label: Sub Pop Records
- Producer: Jesy Fortino

Tiny Vipers chronology
Tiny Vipers (2007)	Life on Earth (2009)	Weak Moments of the Shadows (2009)

Alternative cover
- Vinyl Edition cover

Professional ratings
Aggregate scores
Source	Rating
Metacritic	68/100
Review scores
Source	Rating
Allmusic	3/5 stars
Drowned In Sound	(6/10)
Pitchfork Media	(7.8/10)
PopMatters	(7/10)
Sputnikmusic	4.5/5 stars
Tiny Mix Tapes	4.5/5 marks

Life on Earth is the second full-length album released by Tiny Vipers on Sub Pop Records on July 7, 2009. In a June 2009 track review, Pitchfork Media awarded "Dreamer" their Best New Music accolade.

Luckyhorse Industries released a 180 gram double vinyl edition on November 16, 2009. It was limited to 500 copies with numbered handmade covers, the first 30 of which were printed on green marble vinyl. "Audrey's Well" is included as a bonus track.

== Track listing ==
1. "Eyes Like Ours" – 5:50
2. "Development" – 6:08
3. "Slow Motion" – 4:03
4. "Dreamer" – 4:14
5. "Time Takes" – 5:51
6. "Young God" – 4:52
7. "Life on Earth" – 10:12
8. "CM" – 3:05
9. "Tiger Mountain" – 6:22
10. "Twilight Property" – 7:52
11. "Outside" – 6:02
12. "Audrey's Well" - 8:33 (vinyl only bonus track)

As of 2020, the album's digital download tracklist on Fortino's Bandcamp page has been truncated and re-ordered without explanation. The new track order there is

1. "Eyes Like Ours" – 5:50
2. "Development" – 6:08
3. "Life on Earth" – 10:12
4. "CM" – 3:05
5. "Dreamer" – 4:14
6. "Slow Motion" – 4:03
7. "Outside" – 6:02

== Bonus disc ==
1. "Blades of Grass" - 37:37

Bonus disc is a CD-R that was available only by pre-ordering the album on Sub Pop's website, although select independent record stores included it as a bundle with the album.
