= Ambience3 =

Studio album by Tiny Vipers
- Released: 2015
- Genres: Experimental, Ambient, No-Fi
- Label: Box Bedroom Rebels

Tiny Vipers chronology
Weak Moments of the Shadows (2009)	Ambience3 (2015)	Laughter (2017)

Ambience3 is the third release in the Ambience series, a collection of experimental music released by the label Box Bedroom Rebels. The album, released in 2015, features original instrumental compositions by Tiny Vipers and remixes by Alexander Johnson and Shaun Blezard. The tracks were recorded directly to tape and are characterized by delicate guitar pieces and dark, brooding drones. The release showcases Tiny Vipers' signature no-fi style, blending delicate guitar pieces with dark, rumbling drones. The music on Ambience3 has drawn comparisons to the tape manipulation techniques of William Basinski and the distant, muffled soundscapes of Grouper. Pitchfork stated that the album "harkened back to Tiny Vipers' pre-Hands Across the Void material."

== Track listing ==
1. "Tape I" – 08:01
2. "Tape II" – 05:05
3. "Tape III" – 08:13
4. "Tape IV" – 05:38
5. "Tape V" – 13:49
6. "Guitar" – 22:46
7. "Alexander Johnson - Tapes Part II Remix" – 09:22
8. "Shaun Blezard - Tape I-IV Remix" – 19:02

== Release details ==
Ambience3 was released in limited edition formats, including a CD version.
