= The Man Who Died in His Boat =

Studio album by Grouper
- Released: February 4, 2013
- Recorded: 2007–2008
- Genre: Ambient; psychedelic folk; dream pop
- Length: 47:07
- Label: Kranky
- Producer: Liz Harris

Grouper chronology
Violet Replacement (2012)	The Man Who Died in His Boat (2013)	Ruins (2014)

Singles from The Man Who Died In His Boat
- 1. "Vital" Released: December 20th, 2012

The Man Who Died in His Boat is the ninth studio album by American musician Liz Harris under the stage name Grouper. It was released on February 4, 2013 on Kranky.

The album consists of outtakes from the previous several years, when she was in the process of recording Dragging a Dead Deer Up a Hill. A photograph of Harris' mother is featured on the cover art.

== Recording ==
In a press release, Harris explained the title The Man Who Died in His Boat, which refers to an incident on Agate Beach in Bolinas, California:

When I was a teenager the wreckage of a sailboat washed up on the shore of Agate Beach. The remains of the vessel weren't removed for several days. I walked down with my father to peer inside the boat cabin. Maps, coffee cups and clothing were strewn around inside. I remember looking only briefly, wilted by the feeling that I was violating some remnant of this man's presence by witnessing the evidence of its failure. Later I read a story about him in the paper. It was impossible to know what had happened.

Harris may be referring to an August 1998 incident in which the intact sailboat of Dr. William Groppe (1947–1998), a psychiatrist and sailor from Visalia, California, was found abandoned off the shore of Agate Beach, along with two weeks worth of provisions and his equipment still in working order. Groppe had been en route to visit his girlfriend in Hawaii; he was declared dead in absentia in October 1998.

Speaking of the main protagonist implied in the title of the album, Drowned in Sound columnist Tim Peyton writes: "The mysterious pathos of this incident suits Grouper well. As Harris explains, 'the boat never crashed or capsized... (it) just slipped off somehow. And the boat, like a riderless horse, eventually came back home.' This haunting return of an unmanned vessel is spooky in a similar way to Harris's ethereal, multi tracked vocals."

== Critical reception ==
Professional ratings
Aggregate scores
Source	Rating
AnyDecentMusic?	7.9/10
Metacritic	81/100
Review scores
Source	Rating
AllMusic	4/5 stars
Consequence of Sound	4/5 stars
Drowned in Sound	9/10
Fact	3.5/5
Mojo	4/5 stars
MusicOMH	4/5 stars
NME	7/10
Pitchfork	8.3/10
PopMatters	7/10
XLR8R	8/10

The aggregate review site Metacritic assigns an average score of 81 out of 100 to The Man Who Died in His Boat based on 17 reviews, indicating "universal acclaim".

The song "Vital" was chosen as "Best New Track" by Pitchfork on December 20, 2012, and the site later placed it at number 88 on their list of the Top 100 Tracks of 2013.

== Track listing ==
All tracks are written by Liz Harris.

No.	Title	Length
1.	"6"	1:49
2.	"Vital"	4:14
3.	"Cloud in Places"	4:05
4.	"Being Her Shadow"	4:45
5.	"Cover the Long Way"	4:06
6.	"Difference (Voices)"	5:48
7.	"Vanishing Point"	3:32
8.	"The Man Who Died in His Boat"	5:01
9.	"Towers"	5:19
10.	"STS"	6:06
11.	"Living Room"	2:22
Total length:		47:07
