= Foreign Body (album) =

Studio album by Mirrorring
- Released: March 19, 2012
- Genre: Ambient, psychedelic folk
- Label: Kranky

Foreign Body is a collaborative album of Tiny Vipers and Grouper under their common moniker Mirrorring. It was released on March 19, 2012, on Kranky.

Professional ratings
Aggregate scores
Source	Rating
Metacritic	78/100
Review scores
Source	Rating
Pitchfork Media	(7.9/10)
NME	(8/10)
Pop Matters	(8/10)

== Track listing ==
All music is composed by Liz Harris and Jesy Fortino.

No.	Title	Length
1.	"Fell Sound"	6:22
2.	"Silent from Above"	4:59
3.	"Cliffs"	9:42
4.	"Drowning the Call"	6:54
5.	"Mine"	8:58
6.	"Mirror of Our Sleeping"	4:36
