= Hands Across the Void =

Studio album by Tiny Vipers
- Released: July 24, 2007
- Label: Sub Pop Records
- Producers: Jesy Fortino, Chris Common

Tiny Vipers chronology
Empire Prism (2006)	Hands Across the Void (2007)	Tiny Vipers (2008)

Hands Across the Void is the first full-length album released by Tiny Vipers after signing with Sub Pop Records. It was released July 24, 2007.

== Track listing ==
All songs written by Jesy Fortino.

1. "Campfire Resemblance" – 4:35
2. "On This Side" – 5:42
3. "Aron" – 3:01
4. "Forest on Fire" – 6:22
5. "Shipwreck" – 3:24
6. "Swastika" – 10:47
7. "The Downward" – 8:13
8. "Fell in a Well" – 5:22 (iTunes bonus track)
