= Girl with Basket of Fruit =

Studio album by Xiu Xiu
- Released: February 8, 2019
- Studio: Nurse (Jamie Stewart's home studio in Los Angeles)
- Genres: Experimental; industrial
- Length: 36:35
- Label: Polyvinyl
- Producers: Angela Seo; Greg Saunier

Xiu Xiu chronology
Forget (2017)	Girl with Basket of Fruit (2019)	Oh No (2021)

Singles from Girl with Basket of Fruit
- 1. "Scisssssssors" Released: December 6, 2018; 2. "Pumpkin Attack on Mommy and Daddy" Released: January 15, 2019; 3. "It Comes Out as a Joke" Released: April 5, 2019

Girl with Basket of Fruit is the eleventh studio album by American experimental band Xiu Xiu, released on February 8, 2019. It follows the band's 2017 album Forget and was co-produced by member Angela Seo and Deerhoof's Greg Saunier. The album is supported by the lead single "Scisssssssors", which was released with an accompanying music video. A second single, entitled "Pumpkin Attack on Mommy and Daddy", was also released with a music video on January 15, 2019.

== Background and lyrics ==
The record is said to feature "themes and references" of and to "ritual, mythology, mundane and divergent belief, film, music, and resurrected motifs from preceding Xiu Xiu videos". It was also noted to be "imbued with the agitation, tension, sorrow and anger that has permeated the daily lives of so many over the last few years". The title is a reference to Caravaggio's Boy with a Basket of Fruit, with the gender switch being crucial to the record. According to member Jamie Stewart:

When this title is a boy it is fey and lovely. When it is a girl is worrisome and rife with danger. Male martyrs are almost always surrounded by nurses, their mothers, adoring angels and other loving disciples wrapping their crushed and holy bodies in strips of herb soaked cloth and weeping rapturously. Female martyrs are almost always depicted having their skin flayed, breasts branded or ripped off with tongs or being stabbed and they are always, always alone save for her murderers. There is never anyone by their sides celebrating their spiritual life, only fiendishly reveling in their torture of her. It is perilous to be a 'girl.'

Stewart, alongside a selection of images connected to each of the album's songs and Angela Seo's favorite and least-favorite lyrics, wrote of Girl with a Basket of Fruit: "Generally, Xiu Xiu songs are narratives about the internal effects of external events. For this record [...] the lyrics were taken largely from the internal effects of internal events: reactions to and explorations of other people's TEXTS [...] and images."

The cover of the album depicts the sigil of Vetis, The Life Promiser, whose name is referenced in the title track of the album.

== Music ==
Lead single "Scisssssssors" was called "ritualistic-sounding" and its video described as featuring "cult-like imagery" by The Fader.

== Reception ==
Professional ratings
Aggregate scores
Source	Rating
AnyDecentMusic?	6.8/10
Metacritic	75/100
Review scores
Source	Rating
AllMusic	4/5 stars
The Line of Best Fit	3.5/10
Pitchfork	6.0/10
PopMatters	8/10
Sputnikmusic	4.0/5
Tiny Mix Tapes	4.5/5 stars
Under the Radar	7.5/10
The 405	7.5/10

Girl with Basket of Fruit received positive reviews from critics. On Metacritic, the album holds a score of 75/100 based on 11 reviews, indicating "generally favorable reviews".

== Track listing ==
All tracks produced by Angela Seo and Greg Saunier. Credits adapted from Tidal.

No.	Title	Writer(s)	Length
1.	"Girl with Basket of Fruit"	Daniel Brevil; Gordon McChesney Smith; James Cyrus Stewart	4:16
2.	"It Comes Out as a Joke"	Stewart	3:01
3.	"Amargi ve Moo"	Devra Hoff; Stewart	4:51
4.	"Ice Cream Truck"	Stewart	2:38
5.	"Pumpkin Attack on Mommy and Daddy"	Carl Elliot Reed; Stewart; Angela Seo	5:01
6.	"The Wrong Thing"	Hoff; Stewart	4:55
7.	"Mary Turner Mary Turner"	Stewart	3:48
8.	"Scisssssssors"	Brevil; Smith; Stewart	4:27
9.	"Normal Love"	Hoff; Stewart	3:38
Total length:			36:35

== Personnel ==
Credits adapted from liner notes.

Xiu Xiu

- Jamie Stewart – vocals, synthesizers, guitar, experimental percussion, viola, recording (Note: Credited under the pseudonym "Butch Jenny Stewart" for recording.)
- Angela Seo – piano, vocals, electronic percussion, organ, harmonium, production

Additional musicians

- Daniel Brevil – percussion
- Devra Hoff – double bass, bass violin, bass guitar
- Emmanuel Obi – percussion, experimental percussion, vocals
- Ayo Okafor – percussion
- Elliot Reed – percussion, experimental percussion, vocals
- Eugene Robinson – vocals
- Greg Saunier – organ, production
- Ches Smith – percussion
- Ace Stewart – vocals
- River Stewart – vocals

Technical

- John Congleton – mixing
- Lawrence English – mastering
- Tara Jane O'Neil – additional recording

== Charts ==
Chart performance for Girl with Basket of Fruit
Chart (2019)	Peak position
US Heatseekers Albums (Billboard)	19
US Independent Albums (Billboard)	47
