= Weekends of Sound =

Studio album by 764-Hero
- Released: July 18, 2000
- Genre: Indie rock, emo
- Length: 42:00
- Label: Up Records
- Producer: Phil Ek

764-Hero chronology
Get Here and Stay (1998)	Weekends of Sound (2000)	Nobody Knows This Is Everywhere (2002)

Professional ratings
Review scores
Source	Rating
AllMusic	4/5 stars
Pitchfork	8.0/10
Punknews.org	3.5/5 stars

Weekends of Sound is the third full-length studio album by the indie rock band 764-Hero. It was released in 2000 on Up Records.

== Critical reception ==
The Stranger wrote that "throughout this outstanding record, tension coolly builds and unravels, insinuating what's to come." Phoenix New Times thought that "the distinctly new production aesthetic shines through in the thumps and clashes of Johnson's intricate drum patterns, in the meandering tangents of Bertram's bass lines and in the subdued tinkling of Atkins' guitar notes."

== Track listing ==
All lyrics are written by 764-Hero; all music is composed by 764-Hero.

No.	Title	Length
1.	"Terrified of Flight"	4:24
2.	"Without Fire"	3:32
3.	"Out Like a Light"	4:06
4.	"Weekends of Sound"	5:35
5.	"Leslie"	3:17
6.	"Left Hanging"	9:07
7.	"You Were the Long Way Home"	4:17
8.	"Something Else"	3:15
9.	"Blue Light"	4:31

== Personnel ==
- John Atkins - guitar
- James Bertram - bass
- Polly Johnson - drums
