= Tiny Vipers =

American singer-songwriter

- Born: Jessica Louise Fortino; 1983 (age 42–43)
- Origin: Seattle, Washington, United States
- Occupation: Singer-songwriter
- Instruments: Vocals, guitar, keyboard
- Years active: 2006–present
- Labels: Sub Pop Records, Luckyhorse Industries, LEITER, Kranky (Mirrorring), Box Bedroom Rebels
- Website: Tiny Vipers

Tiny Vipers (born 1983) is the music project of American singer and multi-instrumentalist Jessica "Jesy" Louise Fortino. Known for its minimalism, her style combines elements of folk, ambient, and atmospheric music and is characterized by sparse instrumentation, often using just an acoustic guitar and vocals. Fortino's work spans across several albums, EPs, and collaborative projects, earning her recognition within indie music. Her music has been praised for its emotional depth, trance-like qualities, and stark approach.

== Career ==
=== Early work and Sub Pop ===
Tiny Vipers signed with Sub Pop Records in the mid-2000s, releasing her debut album, Hands Across the Void, in 2007. The album was praised for its haunting simplicity and melancholic atmosphere. The New York Times highlighted the record's meditative quality, comparing Fortino's sparse arrangements to those of artists like Vashti Bunyan and early Cat Power.

Her follow-up album, Life on Earth was released on July 7, 2009, further solidified her reputation as a unique voice in contemporary folk. Luckyhorse Industries released a limited edition 180 gram double vinyl on November 16, 2009, which included a bonus track "Audrey's Well". The record explored themes of mortality and isolation, with Pitchfork describing it as a “bleak but beautiful” work. Tracks like “Dreamer” are crafted such that they feel both intimate and vast, drawing comparisons by critics to Nico and Leonard Cohen.

=== Collaborations and Mirrorring ===
On January 20, 2012, it was announced that Fortino would be releasing a collaborative album with Liz Harris of Grouper, under the name Mirrorring. Their sole album Foreign Body was released on March 19, 2012, by Kranky, blending ambient textures with acoustic instrumentation. Foreign Body earned critical praise for its ethereal, dreamlike quality.

=== Return and recent work ===
After an extended hiatus from recording, Tiny Vipers returned in 2017 with the album Laughter on Ba Da Bing Records. Released on May 5, 2017, while Fortino was simultaneously studying to become an engineer, the record marked a departure from her earlier acoustic work, incorporating electronic elements and synthetic textures. NPR described the album as a “synthetic hymnal,” noting its experimental approach and Fortino's continued exploration of existential themes.

After a second hiatus from recording, Tiny Vipers returned with a new EP in 2024 titled American Prayer released by LEITER. The release reflected an evolving sound while remaining consistent with the haunting, minimalistic style defining her oeuvre. The EP has been praised for the depth of its lyrics and its atmospheric production, offering listeners a glimpse into a personal side of Fortino's creative journey.

Fortino has also directed music videos, including one in 2023 for a single by Profit Prison titled "Sophia".

Tiny Vipers released Tormentor in October 2025, Fortino's fourth album under the moniker and the first Tiny Vipers album in eight years. Tormentor is a full LP that includes songs featured in the EP American Prayer as well as newly released material. Fortino describes the album as telling the stories of her life. It blends Tiny Viper's early raw acoustic sound with the aesthetic of her later ambient works. The cultural webzine Addict Culture described tracks on the album as alternatively strange, moving, beautiful, and feverish. Tormentor was funded entirely by Fortino and released independent of a record label.

== Musical style ==
Tiny Vipers' music is characterized by its minimalist approach, with Fortino often performing solo with just a guitar and her voice. Her lyrics explore themes of loneliness, loss, and the passage of time. Over the years, her sound has included ambient and electronic influences, pushing the boundaries of traditional folk music.

== Discography ==
=== Solo discography ===
- Tiny Vipers (EP, 2004. reissued October 2007 on Luckyhorse Industries)
- Hands Across the Void (LP, July 2007 on Sub Pop)
- Empire Prism (EP, 2007. Reissued July 2008 on Luckyhorse Industries)
- Life on Earth (LP, July 2009 on Sub Pop)
- Weak Moments of the Shadows (EP, 2009)
- Ambience3 (instrumental, ambient music - released in June 2015 on Box Bedroom Rebels)
- Laughter (EP, 2017)
- American Prayer (EP, 2022)
- Illusionz Vol. 1 (1997 - 2004) (LP, compilation of previously unreleased demo recordings, 2025)
- Tormentor (LP, October 2025)

=== Mirrorring discography ===
- Foreign Body (with Grouper) (LP, March 2012 on Kranky)

=== Compilations ===
- Burn to Shine (DVD, November 2007)
- Contributed song "Another's Day Son" with Colin Roper for the compilation 2021: An Aviation Records Compilation (LP, 2007)

=== Guest appearances ===
- Vocal samples and guitar on Orcas' self-titled album (LP, 2012)
- Vocals on "New Dawn Fades" by The Sight Below (Single, 2010)
- Backing vocals on All is Wild, All is Silent, Balmorhea (LP, 2009)

== Critical reception ==
Tiny Vipers has received widespread acclaim for her ability to create emotionally resonant and sonically innovative music. Her work has been featured in outlets like Pitchfork, KEXP, Exclaim!, and Seattle Weekly. Critics frequently note her evocative storytelling and the immersive quality of her recordings. The New York Times stated Tiny Vipers "[is] not telling stories; she’s after incantation and trance,” described her music as “achingly beautiful, an exercise in minimalism that still conveys profound emotional depth.”
