= Lync =

American northwest post-hardcore/emo band

- Origin: Olympia, Washington, United States
- Genres: Post-hardcore, indie rock, emo, lo-fi
- Years active: 1992–1994
- Labels: Magic Pail, Candy Ass, Landspeed, K, Troubleman Unlimited
- Past members: Sam Jayne; James Bertram; Dave Schneider

Lync was a 1990s post-hardcore band from Olympia, Washington.

Formed in 1992, Lync was composed of vocalist/guitarist Sam Jayne, bassist/vocalist James Bertram and drummer Dave Schneider. Lync's distinctive sound of distortion, cryptic lyrics, and irregular tuning created a chaotic, visceral sound which drew comparisons to Fugazi, Unwound, Hush Harbor, The Fall, and Drive Like Jehu.

The band went on to release singles on Magic Pail, Candy Ass, Landspeed, and K Records. Jayne and Bertram played on Beck's album One Foot in the Grave in 1994, right before releasing Lync's one full-length album on K, These Are Not Fall Colors. Lync then disbanded in late 1994.

In 1997, Troubleman Unlimited and K collected the band's singles and unreleased tracks and released them on one compact disc, Remembering The Fireballs (Part 8).

After disbanding, Jayne began recording under the Love as Laughter moniker with some contributions from Schneider. Love as Laughter released several singles and one album on K Records titled "The Greks Bring Gifts." After multiple incarnations, Love as Laughter eventually became a full band based out of New York City and released albums on Sub Pop and Isaac Brock's new imprint Glacial Pace.

Meanwhile, Bertram and Schneider joined Built to Spill as touring musicians. This is documented on the K Records release The Normal Years.

Bertram went on to form the band Red Stars Theory with Modest Mouse drummer Jeremiah Green, and subsequently joined 764-HERO for two albums and several tours. He currently operates the music label and merchandising company Luckyhorse Industries.

Despite their brief history, Lync gained a small cult following in the indie music scene, particularly in the Pacific Northwest. Lync's music is credited with influencing the sound of later acts such as Modest Mouse, Roadside Monument, and The Promise Ring.

== Discography ==
=== Albums ===
- These Are Not Fall Colors (K Records, 1994) (CD, LP, CS)

=== Singles ===
- "Firestarter" (Candy Ass Records) (7") (1993) (split-single with Excuse 17)
- "Mhz" (Magic Pail Records, Landspeed) (7") (1993)
- "Pigeons" (Magic Pail Records) (7") (1993)
- "Two Feet in Front" (K Records) (7") (1994)

=== Compilations ===
- Remembering the Fireballs (Part 8) (K Records, 1997) (CD, LP)
