= Laughter (EP) =

EP by Tiny Vipers
- Released: May 5, 2017
- Label: Ba Da Bing Records
- Producer: Jesy Fortino

Tiny Vipers chronology
| Ambience3 (2015) | Laughter (2017) | American Prayer (2024) |

Laughter is the fourth EP released by Tiny Vipers. It is the first major solo album released by Tiny Vipers in eight years. Laughter was created by Jesy Fortino while she was at the University of Washington studying civil engineering. It is a departure from previous major solo albums in that it relies mostly on synths and keyboards.

== Track listing ==
All songs written by Jesy Fortino.

1. "Boarding Charon's Boat" – 2:19
2. "Crossing the River of Yourself" – 6:25
3. "Living on a Curve" – 9:46
4. "K.I.S.S." – 4:13
5. "The Summing of Moments" - 3:53
6. "Laughter" - 14:22
