= Mirrorring =

- Genres: Ambient, Folk music
- Years active: 2012–present
- Label: Kranky
- Spinoff of: Grouper; Tiny Vipers
- Members: Liz Harris; Jesy Fortino

Mirrorring is a musical collaboration between Liz Harris (of Grouper) and Jesy Fortino (of Tiny Vipers). Based in the Pacific Northwest of the United States, the pairing came about after the two musicians had toured together in Europe. Deliberately misspelling their band name for the symmetrical effect that it creates, their debut album, Foreign Body, was released in March 2012 through Kranky.
