= Shade (Grouper album) =

Studio album by Grouper
- Released: October 22, 2021
- Recorded: 2006–2021
- Length: 34:59
- Label: Kranky
- Producer: Liz Harris

Grouper chronology
Grid of Points (2018)	Shade (2021)

Singles from Shade
- 1. "Unclean Mind" Released: July 27th, 2021; 2. "Ode To The Blue" Released: September 15th, 2021

Shade is the twelfth studio album by American musician Liz Harris under the stage name Grouper. It was released in the United States on October 22, 2021 on Kranky. Shade received acclaimed from critics, appearing on several lists of the best albums of the year.

== Recording ==
Shade consists of songs recorded over a span of fifteen years, from 2006 to 2021.

== Release ==
Shade was announced on July 27, 2021. Accompanying the announcement, the track "Unclean Mind" was released. On September 15, Grouper released and shared a video for the track "Ode to the Blue". The video featured musician Julia Holter.

== Critical reception ==
Professional ratings
Aggregate scores
Source	Rating
AnyDecentMusic?	7.9/10
Metacritic	86/100
Review scores
Source	Rating
AllMusic	4/5 stars
Beats Per Minute	71%
Clash	8/10
Exclaim!	8/10
Mojo	4/5 stars
musicOMH	4.5/5 stars
Paste	7.5/10
Pitchfork	8.2/10
The Skinny	4/5 stars
Uncut	9/10

The aggregate review site Metacritic assigns an average score of 86 out of 100 to the album based on 15 reviews, indicating "universal acclaim".

Shade was ranked the 2nd best album of the year in The Washington Post's year-end list.

=== Accolades ===
Accolades for Shade
Publication	Accolade	Rank
AllMusic	AllMusic's Best of 2021	N/A
BrooklynVegan	BrooklynVegan's Top 50 Albums of 2021	38
The Fader	The Fader's Top 50 Albums of 2021	47
Pitchfork	Pitchfork's Top 50 Albums of 2021	18
The Quietus	The Quietus' Top 100 Albums of 2021	39
Washington Post	The Washington Post's Top 10 Albums of 2021	2
The Wire	The Wire's Top 50 Albums of 2021	29

== Track listing ==
All tracks are written by Liz Harris.

No.	Title	Length
1.	"Followed The Ocean"	2:54
2.	"Unclean Mind"	3:51
3.	"Ode to the Blue"	2:53
4.	"Pale Interior"	3:51
5.	"Disordered Minds"	4:34
6.	"The Way Her Hair Falls"	2:35
7.	"Promise"	2:49
8.	"Basement Mix"	5:17
9.	"Kelso (Blue Sky)"	6:15
Total length:		34:59
