= Willoughby Tucker, I'll Always Love You =

2025 studio album by Ethel Cain

Studio album by Ethel Cain
- Released: August 8, 2025
- Genres: Americana; slowcore; folk; indie pop; shoegaze
- Length: 73:35
- Label: Daughters of Cain (via AWAL)
- Producers: Ethel Cain; Matthew Tomasi

Ethel Cain chronology
| Perverts (2025) | Willoughby Tucker, I'll Always Love You (2025) |

Singles from Willoughby Tucker, I'll Always Love You
- 1. "Nettles" Released: June 4, 2025; 2. "Fuck Me Eyes" Released: July 2, 2025

Willoughby Tucker, I'll Always Love You is the second studio album by the American singer-songwriter and record producer Ethel Cain. It was released by her independent record label Daughters of Cain on August 8, 2025, as her second release of the year, following the standalone recording Perverts (2025). The lyrical narrative present in Willoughby Tucker, I'll Always Love You serves as the prequel to Cain's debut album, Preacher's Daughter (2022). The singles "Nettles" and "Fuck Me Eyes" preceded the album in June and July 2025, respectively.

Upon its release, Willoughby Tucker, I'll Always Love You was met with critical acclaim and debuted within the top 10 on the main charts of Australia, New Zealand and Scotland. To promote the album, Cain embarked on the Willoughby Tucker Forever Tour, which passed through North America, Europe and Australia between August 2025 and July 2026. The album is a return to the Americana music as her debut, also including slowcore, contemporary folk, indie pop and shoegaze genres.

== Background ==
In 2022, Ethel Cain released her debut studio album, Preacher's Daughter, which garnered her critical acclaim and a cult following. In interviews published at the end of the year, she revealed that she was working on an extended play (EP) serving as a prequel to the album's narrative. She stated that it would be centered on the main character's teenage years and her romance with Willoughby, a man who the track "A House in Nebraska" was written about.

Cain shared demos of new songs on SoundCloud, which The Line of Best Fit believed would be part of a release containing B-sides scrapped from Preacher's Daughter. Speaking with Kiernan Shipka for Interview, the singer stated that she was trying to finish the project to release it later in 2023. In 2024, the publication Stereogum reported that Cain would be releasing an EP soon after containing the B-sides, under the title Willoughby Tucker, I'll Always Love You.

== Concept and themes ==
The fictional story from Willoughby Tucker, I'll Always Love You serves as a prequel to the narrative from Preacher's Daughter. It begins in 1986, five years before the start of the events from the previous album. Cain described it as "the year everything changed forever".

The storyline follows Ethel's teenage years and her romance with Willoughby Tucker. The album opens with "Janie", where a sixteen-year-old Ethel grapples with feelings of abandonment after her best friend starts a new relationship. She pleads against this loss that she feels is inevitable with the lines, "Please don't leave me / I'll always need more". Following is the instrumental "Willoughby's Theme". Cain stated in an Instagram post that she wanted to "capture the nauseating, dizzying fear and rush of falling in love" on the track. The third track and second single, "Fuck Me Eyes", introduces a new character to the Ethel Cain storyline. The track narrates Ethel's jealousy of her classmate Holly Reddick, whom she believes is in love with Willoughby. On "Nettles", Ethel fantasizes about a dying Willoughby, mirroring her fear of losing him forever. In the song, nettles serve as a metaphor for Ethel feeling "difficult to be loved". The decline in their relationship festers on "Dust Bowl", a track focused on ruin: "Pretty boy / Consumed by death / With the holes in his sneakers". The record shifts into a gothic atmosphere on "A Knock At The Door", where Ethel places her lover on a pedestal and imagines him as a "two-dimensional white knight". The perspective shifts to Willoughby on "Tempest", asking "Can you hear them? / The trains" to allude to Willoughby's fear of the weather, which is something Ethel failed to understand due to her imagined, toughened version of Willoughby. Ethel and Willoughby's story concludes with "Waco, Texas", where Ethel remains frozen in naive hope while Willoughby realizes "love is not enough in this world".

== Release and promotion ==
Cain announced Willoughby Tucker, I'll Always Love You on social media on March 24, 2025. Alongside the announcement of the album, she revealed that she would be embarking on the Willoughby Tucker Forever Tour between August and November 2025 throughout North America and Europe. Willoughby Tucker, I'll Always Love You was revealed to be set for release in August 2025. Originally described as a companion EP, it eventually became Cain's second studio album. On May 28, 2025, Cain announced the album's lead single, "Nettles", which was released on June 4, 2025. Along with the release of the single, the specific release date of the album was revealed to be August 8, 2025. A second single, "Fuck Me Eyes", was released on July 2, 2025. On July 7, 2025, Cain shared its track listing via social media.

== Critical reception ==
Professional ratings
Aggregate scores
| Source | Rating |
|---|---|
| AnyDecentMusic? | 8.3/10 |
| Metacritic | 83/100 |
Review scores
| Source | Rating |
| AllMusic | 4/5 stars |
| Clash | 9/10 |
| DIY | 5/5 stars |
| The Independent | 4/5 stars |
| The Line of Best Fit | 9/10 |
| NME | 5/5 stars |
| Pitchfork | 6.7/10 |
| Rolling Stone | 3/5 stars |
| Slant Magazine | 4/5 stars |
| Uncut | 8/10 |

Willoughby Tucker, I'll Always Love You has received acclaim from critics. On Metacritic, which assigns a weighted average rating out of 100 to reviews from mainstream critics, the album received a rating of 83 out of 100 based on eighteen critic reviews, indicating "universal acclaim". Similarly, on AnyDecentMusic?, it received a rating of 8.3 out of 10, based on 23 reviews.

=== Rankings ===
Year-end rankings for Willoughby Tucker, I'll Always Love You
| Publication | Accolade | Rank | Ref. |
|---|---|---|---|
| The Line of Best Fit | The Best Albums of 2025 Ranked | 47 | |
| Our Culture | The 100 Best Albums of 2025 | 40 | |
| Time Out | The 25 Best Albums of 2025 | 23 | |
| Ondarock | The Best Albums of 2025 | 13 | |

== Commercial performance ==
Willoughby Tucker, I'll Always Love You debuted at number 12 on the UK Albums Chart on August 15, 2025. It became Cain's second top-twenty album in the United Kingdom after Preacher's Daughter peaked at number 10 in April 2025.

== Track listing ==
All tracks are written by Hayden Anhedönia, except where noted.

Willoughby Tucker, I'll Always Love You track listing
| No. | Title | Writer(s) | Length |
|---|---|---|---|
| 1. | "Janie" | Anhedönia; Matthew Tomasi | 5:00 |
| 2. | "Willoughby's Theme" | | 4:44 |
| 3. | "Fuck Me Eyes" | | 6:04 |
| 4. | "Nettles" | | 8:03 |
| 5. | "Willoughby's Interlude" | | 7:27 |
| 6. | "Dust Bowl" | Anhedönia; Canaan Dove Amber; Clay E. Parton | 6:26 |
| 7. | "A Knock at the Door" | | 5:24 |
| 8. | "Radio Towers" | | 5:12 |
| 9. | "Tempest" | Anhedönia; Angel Diaz | 10:00 |
| 10. | "Waco, Texas" | Anhedönia; Tomasi | 15:15 |
| Total length: | | | 73:35 |

Sample credit

- "Dust Bowl" contains an interpolation of "Stars Will Fall", performed by Duster and written by members Canaan Dove Amber and Clay Parton.

== Personnel ==
Credits adapted from Tidal

- Hayden Anhedönia – lead vocals, production, mixing, engineering (all tracks); synthesizer (tracks 1, 3, 5, 8–10), background vocals (1, 4), piano (2, 6), banjo (4), acoustic guitar (7)
- Matthew Tomasi – mastering (all tracks), electric guitar (1–5), background vocals (1), production (2), drums (6, 9, 10)
- Mattias Hency – synthesizer (3)
- Dillon Hodges – banjo (4)
- Bryan De Leon – drums (4)
- Danny Carpenter – fiddle (4)
- Steve Colyer – organ (4)
- Todd Beene – additional guitar (4)
- Angel Diaz – additional guitar (6, 10); background vocals, piano (9)

== Charts ==
Chart performance for Willoughby Tucker, I'll Always Love You
| Chart (2025) | Peak position |
|---|---|
| Australian Albums (ARIA) | 5 |
| Austrian Albums (Ö3 Austria) | 23 |
| Belgian Albums (Ultratop Flanders) | 11 |
| Belgian Albums (Ultratop Wallonia) | 92 |
| Canadian Albums (Billboard) | 91 |
| Dutch Albums (Album Top 100) | 11 |
| Finnish Albums (Suomen virallinen lista) | 38 |
| German Albums (Offizielle Top 100) | 16 |
| Hungarian Physical Albums (MAHASZ) | 16 |
| Irish Albums (Official Charts) | 17 |
| Irish Independent Albums (IRMA) | 3 |
| New Zealand Albums (RMNZ) | 5 |
| Polish Albums (ZPAV) | 32 |
| Portuguese Albums (AFP) | 100 |
| Scottish Albums (Official Charts) | 2 |
| Spanish Albums (PROMUSICAE) | 27 |
| Swedish Albums (Sverigetopplistan) | 48 |
| UK Albums (Official Charts) | 12 |
| UK Americana Albums (Official Charts) | 1 |
| UK Independent Albums (Official Charts) | 3 |
| US Billboard 200 | 14 |
| US Independent Albums (Billboard) | 1 |
| US Top Alternative Albums (Billboard) | 2 |
| US Top Rock Albums (Billboard) | 3 |

== Release history ==
Release dates and formats for Willoughby Tucker, I'll Always Love You
| Region | Date | Format | Label | Ref. |
|---|---|---|---|---|
| Various | August 8, 2025 | Digital download; streaming; CD; LP; cassette | Daughters of Cain | |
