= A I A: Dream Loss =

Studio album by Grouper
- Released: April 11, 2011
- Genre: Ambient; dream pop
- Length: 39:10
- Label: Yellow Electric
- Producer: Liz Harris

Grouper chronology
Dragging a Dead Deer Up a Hill (2008)	A I A: Dream Loss (2011)	A I A: Alien Observer (2011)

A I A: Dream Loss is the sixth studio album by American musician Liz Harris under the stage name Grouper. It is the first of her two-part album series A I A, released on April 11, 2011 on Yellow Electric.

== Critical reception ==
Professional ratings
Review scores
Source	Rating
Pitchfork	7.7/10

A I A: Dream Loss, along with A I A: Alien Observer, received an honorable mention on Pitchfork's list of the best albums of 2011.

== Track listing ==
All tracks are written by Liz Harris.

No.	Title	Length
1.	"(first heart tone)"	1:19
2.	"Dragging the Streets"	5:01
3.	"I Saw a Ray"	4:57
4.	"Soul Eraser"	8:00
5.	"Atone"	4:56
6.	"No Other"	3:47
7.	"Wind Return"	5:56
8.	"A Lie"	5:14
Total length:		39:10
