= American Prayer (EP) =

EP by Tiny Vipers
- Released: 2022
- Label: LEITER

Tiny Vipers chronology
Laughter (2017)	American Prayer (2022)

American Prayer is an extended play (EP) by American singer-songwriter Tiny Vipers, released in 2022 through LEITER. The EP marks her first release since the 2017 album Laughter.

== Background and recording ==
The EP was recorded over the course of three days in Seattle, with Fortino's close collaborator Joel Cuplin serving as the studio engineer. The recordings took place at the studio of Fortino's friend, Ken Jarvey. The EP features only Fortino's acoustic guitar and vocals, staying true to her signature sound.

Fortino reflects on the creation of American Prayer, saying, "I quit my job after the pandemic started lifting and took time to reflect on my life and reassess what’s important to me. These songs are a result of that process of reflection." While Fortino chooses not to explicitly unpack the meanings of the songs, they are deeply personal, featuring cryptic lyrics paired with subtle, intricate guitar work.

== Track listing ==
All songs written by Jesy Fortino.

1. "American Prayer" – 4:46
2. "The Elevator" – 4:31
3. "Tormentor" – 4:42
