= The Original Faces =

Studio album by Helen
- Released: September 4, 2015
- Genres: Dream pop; noise pop; shoegaze
- Length: 32:44
- Language: English
- Label: Kranky

The Original Faces is the first album by American shoegaze band Helen. It has received positive reviews from critics.

== Reception ==
According to the review aggregator Metacritic, The Original Faces received "generally favorable reviews" based on a weighted average score of 78 out of 100 from 12 critic scores.

At Consequence of Sound, Nina Corcoran graded this album a C, calling it "12 lackadaisical, echoing, and occasionally adolescent songs" with songwriting that "lacks any real focus", but she also praised Liz Harris' vocals and key tracks that work. Justin Lowman gave this release a 9 out of 10 at Drowned in Sound, stating that the mix of genres and obscure lyrics "works to beautiful effect", making "a very strong album, one that I found myself wanting to listen to over and over again". Ed Nash of The Line of Best Fit gave this 8 out of 10 stars, stating that "the songs flow into each other ingeniously, with musical interludes throughout", with a mix of "brutally loud pop" and "a deftly subtle control". Peter Carden of Mojo called this music "a vaporised take on shoegaze pop" that is "swathed in reverb and cotton candy hiss", making "a record that will erase the day-to-day" and garnered 3 out of 5 stars.

Editors at Pitchfork scored this release 6.9 out of 10 and critic Zoe Camp wrote that "Upon cursory listens, the band's debut album, The Original Faces, appears to be an accessible, if noisy, entry into the shoegaze-pop canon. In all actuality, it's a little bit insane." She summed up that "these ninety-second-ish ditties are too gaunt and echo-ridden to stand alone as memorable singles, but within the tempestuous framework of the album, their vulnerability hits like a late-summer thunderstorm". This was Album of the Week at Spin, where Colin Joyce gave it an 8 out of 10, praising the diverse moods in the songwriting that "allow[s] tracks to slip into interstitial gloom and shutting the shades when the time is right". Will Coma of Tiny Mix Tapes gave this album a 4 out of 5, stating that it "may carry the brisk, shadowy feel of autumn, but the album also functions as a fine soundtrack to 2015’s dwindling, squinty, sweaty dog days, conjuring melted popsicle flies and elusive breezes", with an "adorably terrible posture and pouts in a way that feels quietly celebratory". Writing for Uncut, John Dale scored The Original Faces an 8 out of 10, for being "very lovely indeed", with "sweet, fragile pop melodies [that] are drenched in an enveloping haze of guitar fuzz" that recalls Black Tambourine.

The Original Faces appeared on several year-end or decade-end best album lists. In Fact, it was the 42nd best album of 2015, for having "some of the most fragile and scuzzy ditties this side of the millennium" with a sound that mixed Galaxie 500, 1960s girl groups, and The Velvet Underground. This was the 7th best album of 2015 and the 44th best of the 2010s at Gorilla Vs. Bear. The staff at Tiny Mix Tapes selected The Original Faces as the 22nd best album of 2015, where J. Spicer called it "an alternative record in the best possible sense", continuing that at a time when rock music was receding in the public consciousness, "an album that played it straight to a world of outrageous genres was a blessing". In a round up for the 2010s, the site ranked this at 85 and Paul B. opined that an apt metaphor for the sound on this album was "a boom box encased in muck and suggested that it could be called “surf noise”, making "the type of album that socked you in the stomach for your lunch money then tripped on its way out the door".

== Track listing ==
1. "Ryder" – 3:17
2. "Motorcycle" – 1:50
3. "Covered in Shade" – 1:19
4. "Felt This Way" – 4:01
5. "Pass Me By" – 2:16
6. "Right Outside" – 2:16
7. "Allison" – 3:34
8. "Dying All the Time" – 3:56
9. "Grace" – 2:39
10. "City Breathing" – 1:52
11. "Violet" – 4:09
12. "The Original Faces" – 1:35

== Personnel ==
Helen

- Jed Bindeman – drums
- Liz Harris – guitar, vocals
- Helen – backing vocals
- Scott Simmons – bass guitar

Additional personnel

- Timothy Stollenwerk – audio mastering at Stereophonic Mastering, Portland, Oregon, United States

== See also ==
- 2015 in American music
- 2015 in rock music
- List of 2015 albums
