= These Are Not Fall Colors =

Studio album by Lync
- Released: July 25, 1994
- Recorded: Spring – Summer 1994
- Studio: John and Stu's Place in Seattle, Washington
- Genres: Post-hardcore, emo
- Length: 42:32
- Label: K Records
- Producers: Calvin Johnson, Lync, Phil Ek, Tim Green

Lync chronology
| These Are Not Fall Colors (1994) | Remembering the Fireballs (Part 8) (1997) |

Professional ratings
Review scores
| Source | Rating |
|---|---|
| AllMusic | 4.5/5 stars |
| Pitchfork | 8.7/10 |

These Are Not Fall Colors is the only studio album by the American post-hardcore group Lync. The album was released on K Records in 1994.

== Critical reception ==
The A.V. Club wrote: "Cemented together with ragged, ambient loops of spoken-word samples and guitar feedback, the album's 10 tracks swell and collapse in spasms of alternating beauty, confusion, joy, and skull-scraping noise." Trouser Press deemed the album "not really good, but far from bad," writing that it is "the kind of slackadaisical debut that raises more questions about the band’s intentions and abilities than it answers." Pitchfork wrote that the album "unspools like a collection of song sketches, half-formed ideas that members Sam Jayne, James Bertram, and Dave Schneider pummeled into working shape."

== Track list ==
All tracks are written by Lync.

| No. | Title | Length |
|---|---|---|
| 1. | "B" | 4:31 |
| 2. | "Perfect Shot" | 3:32 |
| 3. | "Silverspoon Glasses" | 4:21 |
| 4. | "Pennies to Save" | 4:06 |
| 5. | "Clay Fighter" | 3:57 |
| 6. | "Cue Cards" | 4:11 |
| 7. | "Angelfood Fodder and Vitamins" | 3:48 |
| 8. | "Heroes and Heroines" | 3:12 |
| 9. | "Turtle" | 4:09 |
| 10. | "Uberrima Fides" | 6:46 |
| 11. | "Can't Tie Yet" | 3:11 |

== Personnel ==
Lync

- Sam Jayne – vocals, guitar
- James Bertram – bass guitar, vocals
- Dave Schneider – drums

Other musical personnel

- John Atkins – vocals on "Angelfood Fodder and Vitamins"
- Tim Green - Moog synthesizer

Production

- Lync – producer, engineer, mixing
- Calvin Johnson – producer, engineer, mixing
- Phil Ek – producer, engineer, mixing
- Tim Green – producer, engineer, mixing
- Josh Warren – photography
- Jeremiah Green - artwork
