= Grid of Points =

Studio album by Grouper
- Released: April 27, 2018
- Recorded: November 2014
- Studios: Studio in Ucross Foundation; Ucross, Wyoming
- Genres: Ambient; dream pop
- Length: 21:52
- Label: Kranky
- Producer: Liz Harris

Grouper chronology
Ruins (2014)	Grid of Points (2018)	Shade (2021)

Singles from Grid Of Points
- 1. "Parking Lot" Released: March 8th, 2018; 2. "Driving" Released: April 3rd, 2018

Grid of Points is the eleventh studio album by the American musician Liz Harris under the stage name Grouper. It was released in the United States on April 27, 2018, by Kranky.

== Recording ==
In 2014, Liz Harris had a residency at the Ucross Foundation in Wyoming. While there, a cold snap kept her indoors and she began to write and record the songs that became Grid of Points. The writing period lasted a week and a half before she developed a fever and stopped. Describing the process, Harris said, "Though brief, it is complete. The intimacy and abbreviation of this music allude to an essence that the songs lyrics speak more directly of. The space left after matter has departed, a stage after the characters have gone, the hollow of some central column, missing."

The short length of the album initially worried the label, which thought that listeners would feel short-changed. However, Harris refused to add more songs, telling the label, "This is the complete idea. It just happens to be 22 minutes."

The song "Parking Lot" was inspired by a scene from the film Zabriskie Point depicting the California desert, which aligned with Harris' own impression. "Driving" was inspired by an image of tree-tunnels, people driving to a funeral and Harris' own family, "trying to find a way through it, without thinking it has to be excavated or turned into something positive".

== Release ==
Grid of Points was announced on March 8, 2018. Accompanying the announcement, the track "Parking Lot" was released. "Parking Lot" was named one of NPR's "Songs We Love" and Pitchfork awarded it their "Best New Track" status. A second pre-release track, "Driving", was issued on April 3.

== Critical reception ==
Professional ratings
Aggregate scores
Source	Rating
AnyDecentMusic?	7.6/10
Metacritic	80/100
Review scores
Source	Rating
AllMusic	4/5 stars
The A.V. Club	B+
Drowned in Sound	9/10
Exclaim!	8/10
Mojo	3/5 stars
NME	4/5 stars
Pitchfork	7.8/10
PopMatters	8/10
Resident Advisor	4.0/5
Uncut	7/10

The aggregate review site Metacritic assigns an average score of 80 out of 100 to the album based on 21 reviews, indicating "generally favorable reviews".

Writing for Drowned in Sound, Benjamin Bland described Grid of Points as "even more austere than its predecessor" and "astonishingly beautiful and astonishingly, painfully real". Tom Beedham of Exclaim! wrote that "with the spare concrete signifiers and evocative open spaces she provides on Grid of Points, she's crafted a map for the full spectrum of human emotions and experiences".

Despite overall praise, reviewers were mixed on whether the length was a positive or negative. Heather Phares of AllMusic praised Harris for sticking with her initial recordings, writing, "Wisely, Harris didn't try to inflate it into something more elaborate." Steven Johnson of MusicOMH was more critical, arguing that "the relative brevity and sparseness of the album … won't see Grid Of Points talked of in the same elevated way as some of her other work".

Grid of Points was ranked the 40th best release of the year in The Wire magazine's annual critics' poll.

=== Accolades ===
Accolades for Grid of Points
Publication	Accolade	Rank
Bandcamp	Bandcamp's Top 100 Albums of 2018	21
Gorilla vs. Bear	Gorilla vs. Bear's Top 30 Albums of 2018	8
Gorilla vs. Bear	Gorilla vs. Bear's Top 5 Albums of 2018 – Mid-Year	3
The Quietus	The Quietus' Top 100 Albums of 2018	23
Resident Advisor	Resident Advisor's Top Albums of 2018	N/A
Sputnikmusic	Sputnikmusic's Top 50 Albums of 2018	40
Tiny Mix Tapes	Tiny Mix Tapes' Top 50 Albums of 2018	9
Uproxx	Uproxx's Top 50 Albums of 2018	30
Uproxx	Uproxx's Top 50 Albums of 2018 – Mid-Year	14
The Wire	The Wire's Top 50 Albums of 2018	40

== Track listing ==
All music is composed by Liz Harris.

No.	Title	Length
1.	"The Races"	0:50
2.	"Parking Lot"	3:32
3.	"Driving"	3:48
4.	"Thanksgiving Song"	3:34
5.	"Birthday Song"	3:22
6.	"Blouse"	2:45
7.	"Breathing"	4:01
Total length:		21:52

== Charts ==
Chart performance for Grid of Points
Chart (2018)	Peak position
UK Independent Albums (Official Charts)	36
