= Fuck Me Eyes =

2025 single by Ethel Cain

Single by Ethel Cain

from the album Willoughby Tucker, I'll Always Love You
- Released: July 2, 2025
- Genre: Synth-pop; shoegaze
- Length: 6:04
- Label: Daughters of Cain
- Songwriter: Hayden Anhedönia
- Producer: Ethel Cain

Ethel Cain singles chronology
"Nettles" (2025)	"Fuck Me Eyes" (2025)	"Meet Me Anywhere" (2025)

Official visualizer
- "Fuck Me Eyes" on YouTube

"Fuck Me Eyes" is a song by the American singer-songwriter and record producer Ethel Cain released through her own record label Daughters of Cain on July 2, 2025, as the second single from her second studio album, Willoughby Tucker, I'll Always Love You (2025).

== Release ==
Ethel Cain announced her second studio album in March 2025. Titled Willoughby Tucker, I'll Always Love You, it was released on August 8, 2025, through her own record label, Daughters of Cain Records. The album's lyrical content serves as a prequel to the narrative of Preacher's Daughter (2022), Cain's previous album, and follows the main fictional character's relationship with Willoughby Tucker. The first single, "Nettles", premiered on June 4, 2025, while the second single, "Fuck Me Eyes", was released on July 2, 2025.

== Composition ==
According to music critics, "Fuck Me Eyes" is a synth-pop power ballad with elements of shoegaze and a mid-tempo instrumentation led by synthesizers. According to Robin Murray of Clash, it has a cinematic approach similar to The Virgin Suicides (2000) by the French music duo Air. Cain uses soft vocals throughout the song and later transitions into a more passionate performance.

The lyrics of "Fuck Me Eyes" serve as a description of a blonde teenage girl who is provocative and promiscuous. The narrator shares her conflicting thoughts about the girl, who she believes attracts her romantic interest. The song is an homage to Kim Carnes's 1981 single "Bette Davis Eyes", which is one of Cain's "favourite pop songs of all time". In a press release, Cain described it as "an ode to the girls who are perfect and have everything, yet carry the reputation of town slut". Cain began to write the song five years prior to its release, as the oldest demo for Willoughby Tucker, I'll Always Love You.

== Critical reception ==
Exclaim! ranked it as the 15th best song of 2025.

== Charts ==
Chart performance for "Fuck Me Eyes"
Chart (2025)	Peak position
New Zealand Hot Singles (RMNZ)	10
US Hot Rock & Alternative Songs (Billboard)	35
