= Nettles (song) =

2025 single by Ethel Cain

Single by Ethel Cain

from the album Willoughby Tucker, I'll Always Love You
- Released: June 4, 2025
- Genre: Americana
- Length: 8:03
- Label: Daughters of Cain
- Songwriter: Hayden Anhedönia
- Producer: Ethel Cain

Ethel Cain singles chronology
"Punish" (2024)	"Nettles" (2025)	"Fuck Me Eyes" (2025)

Official visualizer
- "Nettles" on YouTube

"Nettles" is a song by the American singer-songwriter and record producer Ethel Cain from her second studio album, Willoughby Tucker, I'll Always Love You (2025). It was released as the album's lead single on June 4, 2025, through her independent record label Daughters of Cain.

== Background and release ==
Following the release of her standalone project Perverts (2025), Hayden Anhedönia, known as Ethel Cain, announced her second studio album Willoughby Tucker, I'll Always Love You on March 24, 2025. It was conceived as a prequel to the lyrical narrative from her first concept album, Preacher's Daughter (2022), which received critical acclaim and centered on the story of the fictional character Ethel Cain and her transgenerational trauma. Anhedönia said that Willoughby Tucker, I'll Always Love You is named after the character's first lover, Willoughby Tucker, and its storyline is set in 1986, five years after the death of Cain's father and five years before the start of the events from the previous album.

"Nettles" was released on June 4, 2025, as the lead single from Willoughby Tucker, I'll Always Love You. On the same day, Anhedönia additionally shared the album's release date of August 8, 2025.

== Composition ==
"Nettles" is eight minutes and three seconds long. Anhedönia was in charge of the song's writing, production, and mixing, performed the vocals, and played several instruments: banjo, synthesizers, guitars, and piano. She was accompanied by Dillon Hodges on banjo and acoustic guitar, Bryan De Leon on drums, Matthew Tomasi on electric guitar, Donny Carpenter on fiddle, Steven Colyer on organ, and Todd Beene on pedal steel guitar. In an Instagram story, Anhedönia wrote that she "hunted down the synths [Angelo Badalamenti] used for Twin Peaks and bought them, and those are the ones I used for Willoughby."

In a press release, Anhedönia described "Nettles" as "a dream of losing the one you love, asking them to reassure you that it won't come true and to dream, instead, of all the time you'll have together as you grow old side by side."

Stereogum's Abby Jones categorized "Nettles" as an Americana song, similar to the sound from Preacher's Daughter. It is led by banjo, gothic strings, and acoustic guitar. The song is structured as an epic.

== Charts ==
Chart performance for "Nettles"
Chart (2025)	Peak position
New Zealand Hot Singles (RMNZ)	17
