= 764-HERO =

American indie rock band

- Origin: Seattle, Washington
- Genres: Indie rock, emo
- Years active: 1995–2002, 2012, 2016
- Labels: Suicide Squeeze, Up, Tiger Style
- Members: John Atkins; Polly Johnson; James Bertram; Robin Peringer; Ken Jarvey

764-HERO was an American indie rock band from Seattle, Washington. They were active from 1995 to 2002 and briefly reunited in 2012 and 2016. The group released three albums on Up Records, a fourth on Tiger Style Records, and several other releases, including a collaborative single with their frequent touring partners Modest Mouse.

The band initially comprised singer and guitarist John Atkins and drummer Polly Johnson. The lineup was expanded with the addition of bassist James Bertram in 1998, followed by his replacement Robin Peringer in 2000. The band's music was frequently likened to that of other groups from the Pacific Northwest, and described as the "perfect soundtrack" for the region.

== History ==
=== Formation, Salt Sinks & Sugar Floats and singles (1995–1998) ===
The group was formed in 1995 by John Atkins, a Seattle native and member of Hush Harbor, and Polly Johnson of the band Bell Jar. The two met through David Dickenson, Atkins's coworker and Johnson's partner, who would soon establish Suicide Squeeze Records. The new group remained nameless until its first show, when a friend recommended that they use the Washington State Department of Transportation telephone number for reporting carpool lane violators. The duo debuted with the "High School Poetry" 7" on Up Records later that year.

In the following year, they issued both the "Now You're Swimming" 7" on Suicide Squeeze and their debut album, Salt Sinks & Sugar Floats, on Up. AllMusic critic Ari Wiznitzer described the latter as especially derivative of Pacific Northwestern music in a retrospective review. The group began attracting a national audience, next releasing the We're Solids EP in 1997.

In early 1998, they released Whenever You See Fit, a collaborative single with Modest Mouse. The single's A-side consisted of a single, 14-minute long track that the two groups co-composed and performed while touring together. The B-side contained two remixes, one each by DJ Dynomite D and Scntfc. The record received mixed reviews, though critics praised the remixes.

=== As a trio, Get Here and Stay and Weekends of Sound (1998–2000) ===
In 1998, the band asked James Bertram from Red Stars Theory, and formerly Lync and Beck, to join them as bass guitarist during a radio session. The session was successful, and Bertram joined the band officially thereafter. The new lineup recorded the band's second full-length record, Get Here and Stay, recorded with Built to Spill producer Phil Ek. PopMatters critic Jeremy Schneyer called the album a mix of melancholia and pop sensibilities that stood as "the band's high water mark".

After several tours, the band recorded Weekends of Sound in early 2000, again with Ek. Writing for Pitchfork, Ryan Kearney described the album as "their most accomplished work to date" and characterized by "crisp production".

=== Nobody Knows This Is Everywhere, breakup (2000–2002) ===
After a tour of the United States with Modest Mouse in support of the album, Bertram left the band. Robin Peringer, whom Atkins and Johnson had met as a touring guitarist with Modest Mouse, replaced Bertram. Peringer was initially a temporary replacement but soon became a full member.

In 2001, Atkins joined with friend Joe Plummer to perform songs he felt would not fit 764-HERO. The two formed The Magic Magicians and released their debut album Girls later that year.

764-HERO moved to Tiger Style Records for their final release, Nobody Knows This Is Everywhere, and began touring in its support in March 2002. The album name was a reference to Neil Young's album Everybody Knows This Is Nowhere. The album met with mixed reviews; it was praised by loud paper critic Antonio Girafez as "beautiful and unsettling", but was criticized by Pitchfork's Rob Mitchum for being "mediocre" and "boring" overall. The band broke up later that year, on the eve of their first tour of Japan.

=== Post-breakup and reunions ===
The Magic Magicians continued, releasing their self-titled album in 2003. In 2004, Atkins formed The Can't See with friends Thomas Wright and Ken Jarvey. In 2006 they released Coma Comma no More. Atkins later collaborated with Spencer Moody of the Murder City Devils in the John and Spencer Booze Explosion.

Ten years after disbanding, 764-HERO reunited on March 4, 2012 for a secret show in Seattle. A week later, the band belatedly toured Japan, embarking on five dates with Japanese band Moools. Atkins and Johnson were joined by Ken Jarvey on bass.

The original two-piece lineup reunited briefly in 2016, playing the Suicide Squeeze Records 20th Anniversary Party on August 25. Their two-song set comprised "Now You're Swimming", the first song ever released on the label, and a cover of Elliott Smith's "Division Day".

== Band members ==
- John Atkins – vocals, guitar, keyboards (1995–2002, 2012, 2016)
- Polly Johnson – drums, percussion (1995–2002, 2012, 2016)
- James Bertram – bass, guitar, keyboards (1998–2000)
- Robin Peringer – bass, guitar (2000–2002)
- Ken Jarvey – bass (2012)

Timeline

== Discography ==
Albums

- Salt Sinks & Sugar Floats (Up Records, 1996)
- Get Here and Stay (Up Records, 1998)
- Weekends of Sound (Up Records, 2000)
- Nobody Knows This is Everywhere (Tiger Style Records, 2002)

EPs and singles

- High School Poetry 7" (Up Records, 1995)
- Now You're Swimming 7" (Suicide Squeeze, 1996)
- We're Solids EP (Up Records/Suicide Squeeze, 1997)
- Whenever You See Fit 12" (Up Records/Suicide Squeeze, 1998)
- Garrison 7" (Up Records, 2000)
