= Ruins (Grouper album) =

Studio album by Grouper
- Released: October 31, 2014
- Recorded: 2004 ("Made of Air"); 2011
- Genre: Ambient; psychedelic folk; dream pop
- Length: 39:41
- Label: Kranky
- Producer: Liz Harris

Grouper chronology
The Man Who Died in His Boat (2013)	Ruins (2014)	Grid of Points (2018)

Singles from Ruins
- 1. "Call Across Rooms" Released: September 10th, 2014; 2. "Holding" Released: October 24th, 2014

Ruins is the tenth studio album by American musician Liz Harris under the stage name Grouper. It was released in the United States on October 31, 2014 on Kranky.

== Recording ==
In a statement accompanying the announcement of the album's release, Liz Harris described its recording process:

Ruins was made in Aljezur, Portugal in 2011 on a residency set up by Galeria Zé dos Bois. I recorded everything there except the last song, which I did at mother's house in 2004. Iʼm still surprised by what I wound up with. It was the first time Iʼd sat still for a few years; processed a lot of political anger and emotional garbage. Recorded pretty simply, with a portable 4-track, Sony stereo mic and an upright piano. When I wasnʼt recording songs I was hiking several miles to the beach. The path wound through the ruins of several old estates and a small village. The album is a document. A nod to that daily walk. Failed structures. Living in the remains of love. I left the songs the way they came (microwave beep from when power went out after a storm); I hope that the album bears some resemblance to the place that I was in.

While in Portugal, where she stayed in a house owned by the aunt of music director Sérgio Hydalgo, Harris listened to records by Carlos Paredes, Nina Simone and Leonard Cohen.

Regarding "Call Across Rooms", Harris stated that "the song is on one level very plain and literal, about a letter I wrote for someone I loved and could not get along with. On a more subconscious, poetic level, it is a letter to myself, as aspiration to love better."

The "microwave beep" occurs at the end of "Labyrinth".

== Release ==
On August 14, 2014, Harris announced the album's title. Prior to the album's October 31 release, the tracks "Call Across Rooms" and "Holding" were released, both of which were awarded Pitchfork's "Best New Track" status.

== Critical reception ==
Professional ratings
Aggregate scores
Source	Rating
AnyDecentMusic?	8.0/10
Metacritic	80/100
Review scores
Source	Rating
AllMusic	4/5 stars
Clash	9/10
Consequence of Sound	B
Drowned in Sound	8/10
Fact	4.5/5
Mojo	3/5 stars
NME	8/10
Pitchfork	8.8/10
PopMatters	7/10
Uncut	6/10

Upon its release, Ruins received critical acclaim. At Metacritic, which assigns a normalised rating out of 100 to reviews from mainstream critics, the album holds an average score of 80, indicating "generally favorable reviews", based on 19 reviews. Philip Sherburne of Pitchfork awarded Ruins the site's "Best New Music" title and dubbed it "achingly beautiful and, given the intensely private nature of most of Grouper's work... almost unnervingly direct." Ruins was later named the fifth best album of 2014 on Pitchfork. The album also placed 13th in The Wire's annual critics' poll.

In 2018, Pitchfork ranked Ruins at number 18 on its list of the 30 best dream pop albums.

== Track listing ==
All music is composed by Liz Harris.

No.	Title	Length
1.	"Made of Metal"	1:39
2.	"Clearing"	4:42
3.	"Call Across Rooms"	2:59
4.	"Labyrinth"	3:48
5.	"Lighthouse"	5:44
6.	"Holofernes"	1:33
7.	"Holding"	7:57
8.	"Made of Air"	11:24
Total length:		39:41
