= Dragging a Dead Deer Up a Hill =

Studio album by Grouper
- Released: June 10, 2008
- Recorded: 2007–2008
- Genre: Dream pop; drone; psychedelic pop
- Length: 45:41
- Label: Type
- Producer: Liz Harris

Grouper chronology
| Cover the Windows and the Walls (2007) | Dragging a Dead Deer Up a Hill (2008) | A I A: Dream Loss (2011) |

Kranky reissue

Dragging a Dead Deer Up a Hill is the fifth studio album by American musician Liz Harris under the stage name Grouper. It was released on June 10, 2008 on Type Records. The album was later reissued alongside Grouper's The Man Who Died in His Boat in 2013 by Kranky.

== Cover ==
The cover photograph is of Liz Harris as a child; the photograph was taken by her mother.

== Critical reception and legacy ==
Professional ratings
Aggregate scores
| Source | Rating |
|---|---|
| Metacritic | 80/100 |
Review scores
| Source | Rating |
| AllMusic | 5/5 stars |
| Drowned in Sound | 9/10 |
| Mojo | 4/5 stars |
| Pitchfork | 8.2/10 |
| PopMatters | 9/10 |

Mike McGonigal of Pitchfork described Dragging a Dead Deer Up a Hill as "druggy and sexy and arty and pretty, but never pretentious", calling it "an arresting album of pastoral psychedelic pop".

Reflecting on Deer for its 10th anniversary, Stereogum's Gabriela Tully Claymore credited it with drawing people's attention to Harris' Grouper project. She wrote that it influenced a somewhat "perplexing" fandom despite how unconventional and non-commercial Harris' music was. Claymore also dubbed Deer her "first set of songs that sound like songs." Pitchfork echoed this, noting the tracks as "proper songs" that drew on British folk, devotional music, and "gothic lullabies". Placing it at #6 on their 2018 list of dream pop's 30 best albums, they called its music "crushingly sad" while still giving off "a feeling that art just might save us."

== Track listing ==
All tracks are written by Liz Harris.

| No. | Title | Length |
|---|---|---|
| 1. | "Disengaged" | 4:16 |
| 2. | "Heavy Water/I'd Rather Be Sleeping" | 2:53 |
| 3. | "Stuck" | 5:59 |
| 4. | "When We Fall" | 2:07 |
| 5. | "Traveling Through a Sea" | 4:23 |
| 6. | "Fishing Bird (Empty Gutted in the Evening Breeze)" | 3:51 |
| 7. | "Invisible" | 3:55 |
| 8. | "I'm Dragging a Dead Deer Up a Hill" | 2:21 |
| 9. | "A Cover Over" | 2:48 |
| 10. | "Wind and Snow" | 4:30 |
| 11. | "Tidal Wave" | 5:35 |
| 12. | "We've All Gone to Sleep" | 3:03 |
| Total length: | | 45:41 |
