= Red Stars Theory =

American rock band

- Red Stars Theory press photo

Background information
- Origin: Seattle, WA, United States
- Genres: indie rock, post-rock, slowcore
- Years active: 1995–2000
- Labels: Sub Pop Records, Touch And Go Records, Suicide Squeeze, Deluxe Records, Rx Remedy
- Members: James Bertram; Jason Talley (a.k.a. Jason Harris-Talley); Seth Warren; Tonie Palmasani; Jeremiah Green
- Past members: Lois Maffeo; Sarah May Cates

Red Stars Theory is an American rock band from Seattle, Washington.

== History ==
The band was formed in early-1995 when James Bertram was looking for someone to play guitar with and found Tonie Palmasani (guitar/vocals), Jeremiah Green (drums/percussion/vocals) and Jason Talley (bass guitar/vocals). Later in 1995, the group released a 10-inch on Deluxe Records, the "Slow Curve/Castle Rock" seven-inch and the LP/CD But Sleep Came Slowly. The seven-inch and LP were released by the RX Remedy label, a division of Sub Pop. Seth Warren was asked to play violin on But Sleep Came Slowly and has since been a member of the group. The LP/CD Life In A Bubble Can Be Beautiful was the group's debut album for Touch and Go Records. But Sleep Came Slowly and Life In A Bubble Can Be Beautiful both featured Lois Maffeo as a guest vocalist. Sarah May Cates was a guest cellist on Life In A Bubble....

Red Stars Theory took a hiatus for several years following the release of an eponymous EP for Touch and Go Records in 2000. Due to Jeremiah and James’ hectic touring schedules (playing in both Modest Mouse and 764-HERO), the band has had a fairly infrequent touring schedule.

Suicide Squeeze has released a compilation CD combining the band's out-of-print Rx Remedy seven-inch and Deluxe Records 10-inch. In 2000 Suicide Squeeze released the "Naima" seven-inch, a minimalistic cover of a song from John Coltrane's Giant Steps album. The b-side of "Naima" is "North to Next (exit)", a remix by Scientific American featuring prominent samples from the first two tracks of Life in a Bubble....

In 2006, the band contributed the track "Evergreen and Ivorbean" to Suicide Squeeze's 10th anniversary compilation, the CD/LP Slaying Since 1996.

== Discography ==
- self-titled 10 inch EP on Deluxe Records (1995)
- Slow Curve/Castle Rock 7 inch EP on Rx Remedy (1995)
- But Sleep Came Slowly album on Rx Remedy (1997)
- Life in a Bubble Can Be Beautiful album on Touch And Go Records (1999)
- Red Stars Theory EP on Touch And Go Records (2000)
- Naima / North to Next Exit 7 inch EP on Suicide Squeeze (2000)
- Red Stars Theory EP on Suicide Squeeze (2001)
- "Evergreen and Ivorbean" track on the compilation album Slaying Since 1996 (2006)
