= Grouper (musician) =

American musician and singer-songwriter

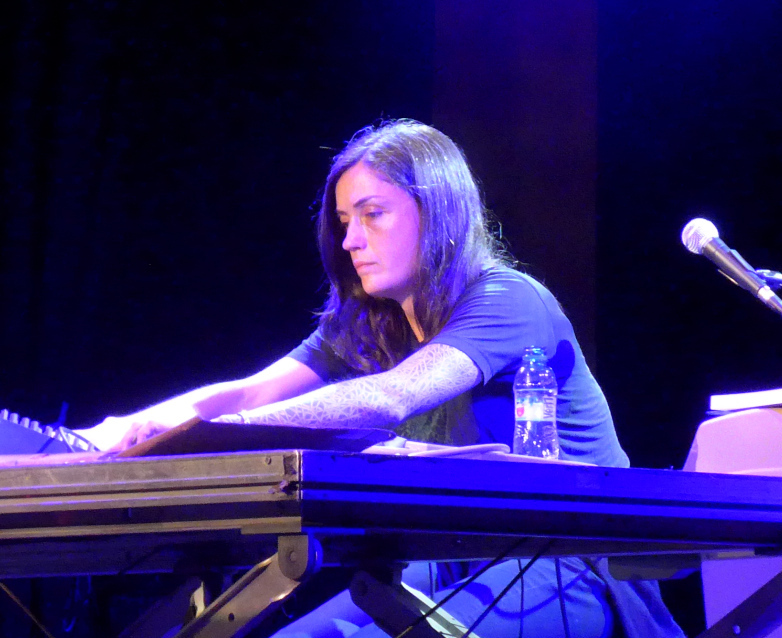
- Harris performing as Grouper in 2014

Background information
- Born: Elizabeth Anne Harris; July 15, 1980 (age 46); West Marin, California, U.S.
- Origin: Astoria, Oregon
- Education: University of California, Berkeley
- Genres: Psychedelic folk; ambient; slowcore; minimal
- Occupations: Musician; singer-songwriter; producer
- Years active: 2005–present
- Labels: YELLOWELECTRIC; Root Strata; West 25th; Peak Oil; Kranky

Grouper is the solo project of American musician, artist, and producer Liz Harris (born July 15, 1980). (Note: Harris revealed her birthdate in a post via her official Instagram account, which reads: "Two months [after the eruption of Mount St. Helens,] I squealed my way into the world on Ian Curtis’ birthday" (Curtis was born July 15, 1956).) She has released material on her own label and other independent labels since 2005. Grouper released the critically acclaimed Dragging a Dead Deer Up a Hill in 2008, followed by five more records, including a two-part album, A I A, and the piano-led album Ruins. Her twelfth album, Shade, was released in 2021.

Grouper has collaborated with a number of other artists, including Xiu Xiu, Tiny Vipers (as the duo Mirrorring), Roy Montgomery, The Bug, Inca Ore, Lawrence English (as Slow Walkers), Jefre Cantu-Ledesma (as Raum) and Paul Clipson. The critic Brett Abrahamsen referred to her as a "genius of modern music" in his 2022 profile of Roy Montgomery.

== Biography ==
Harris was born July 15, 1980, in Northern California and grew up around the San Francisco Bay area. She grew up in a Fourth Way commune there which was inspired by the philosophy of George Gurdjieff. The community was known as "The Group", which would later serve as some inspiration for the moniker Grouper. According to Harris, the kids called each other and the parents 'groupers' sort of as a defiance. She says: "It was us making our own identities inside a pretty controlled environment, and sort of lashing back maybe... When I had to think of a name I felt annoyed at nothing sounding right. I wanted something that referenced me without referencing 'Me.'" According to her, she "felt like the music was at its barest just a grouping of sounds, and I was just the grouper."

After graduating from University of California, Berkeley with a Bachelor of Fine Arts degree, Harris briefly moved to Los Angeles, where she worked with Mayo Thompson at Patrick Painter. Harris’ first album was 2005's Grouper, a self-released full-length CD-R, followed later that year by Way Their Crept on Free Porcupine (re-released in 2007 on Type Records). In 2006 she released a single ("He Knows"), one album, called Wide, and a collaboration with Xiu Xiu entitled Creepshow. Harris made available new material steadily through the years, and continued to collaborate with various artists such as Roy Montgomery and Xela.

In 2008 she released Dragging a Dead Deer Up a Hill, her breakthrough album. AllMusic reviewer Heather Phares praised the album for showing more musical range than Harris' previous work and for "letting more melody, more structured songs, and even a few phrases emerge from the ether." Pitchfork gave it 8.2 stars, calling the work "an arresting album of pastoral psychedelic pop". Also in 2008, Grouper and Inca Ore collaborated on the song Poison Tree.

In 2011, Grouper released an album consisting of two parts: A I A: Dream Loss and A I A: Alien Observer, which was critically acclaimed by Pitchfork, while the latter part was noted for being more accessible of the two discs.

Early in 2012, Grouper performed Violet Replacement in the UK and Europe, a pair of longform tape collage pieces which originally took shape for commissioned performances in New York and Berkeley. She also collaborated with Jesy Fortino of Tiny Vipers to release an album Foreign Body under their common moniker Mirrorring.

At Berlin's Club Transmediale festival in early February 2012 Harris performed Circular Veil in collaboration with Jefre Cantu-Ledesma. Somewhere between an installation and a performance, it found her extending her more concise music outward into eight hours of music, designed to mimic one full sleep cycle.

In 2013, Harris released an album, The Man Who Died in His Boat.

Grouper's studio album titled Ruins was released on October 31, 2014. The album is relatively stripped-down; piano, voice and field recordings. The majority of the album was recorded in Aljezur, Portugal in 2011, while Harris was on a residency set up by Galeria Zé dos Bois. That same year she appeared on The Bug's album providing vocals for the track "Void".

In 2015, Grouper collaborated with independent filmmaker Paul Clipson on the film Hypnosis Display, commissioned by Leeds Opera North.

In 2016, Grouper released a 7" entitled 'Paradise Valley'.

In 2017, Grouper was one of the curators for the 11th edition of the Dutch Le Guess Who? festival. Her curated program included films La Double Vie de Véronique by Krzysztof Kieślowski and Lighthouse by Paul Clipson and music performances from artists Marisa Anderson, William Basinski, Marcia Bassett & Samara Lubelski duo, Brötzmann/Leigh, Ekin Fil, Keiji Haino, Roy Montgomery, Coby Sey, Tiny Vipers, Wolfgang Voigt and Richard Youngs.

On March 8, 2018, Grouper announced a new album Grid of Points and released the first single "Parking Lot" from the album. The album was released on April 27 via Kranky.

On July 27, 2021, Harris announced a new Grouper album, Shade, and released its first single "Unclean Mind". The album was released on October 22 via Kranky. It features songs that were recorded over the past fifteen years.

Harris resides in Astoria, Oregon where she owns an exhibition space, and also has a record label Yellow Electric.

== Musical style ==
Grouper's work is wide-ranging, incorporating sparse ambient music, tape, field recordings, acoustic guitar, piano, and vocal loops. Writing for the Chicago Tribune, Andy Downing noted a primitive and collage approach to how Harris constructs soundscapes.

During her childhood as a member of a Fourth Way commune, Harris' primary sources for discovering music were limited. Through her parents she discovered Eastern European folk and American avant-pop. Through her father, who himself was a composer, she would later discover contemporary classical and early music. In 2008, when she released Dragging a Dead Deer Up a Hill, Pitchfork compared it to classic ethereal releases from the British label 4AD, drawing comparisons to Cocteau Twins and early His Name Is Alive. The Portland Mercury described some songs from the album, such as "Wind and Snow" and "Stuck", sonically reminiscent of the Renaissance period composers Gesualdo and Monteverdi.

== Discography ==
=== Albums ===
- Grouper (2005)
- Way Their Crept (2005)
- Wide (2006)
- Cover the Windows and the Walls (2007)
- Dragging a Dead Deer Up a Hill (2008)
- A I A: Dream Loss (2011)
- A I A: Alien Observer (2011)
- The Man Who Died in His Boat (2013)
- Ruins (2014)
- Grid of Points (2018)
- Shade (2021)

=== EPs and singles ===
- He Knows (2006)
- Tried (2007)
- Hold/Sick (2010)
- Water People (2011)
- Violet Replacement| Pt. I: Rolling Gate (2012)
- Violet Replacement| Pt. II: Sleep (2012)
- Paradise Valley (2016)
- Children (2017)

=== Collaborations ===
- Creepshow as Xiu Xiu vs. Grouper (2006)
- Eckords. with Jorge Boehringer as Flash Lights (2006)
- Inca Ore / Grouper with Inca Ore (2008)
- Visitor with Ilyas Ahmed (2011)
- Foreign Body with Tiny Vipers as Mirrorring (2012)
- Slow Walkers with Lawrence English as Slow Walkers (2013)
- Event of Your Leaving with Jefre Cantu-Ledesma as Raum (2013)
- "Felt This Way"/"Dying All the Time" with Jed Bindeman and Scott Simmons as Helen (2014)
- Void and Black Wasp with The Bug (2014)
- The Original Faces (2015, Helen)
- Daughter with Jefre Cantu-Ledesma as Raum (2022)
- Linda's Head (2026, Helen)

=== Split releases ===
- Inca Ore / Grouper with Inca Ore (2008)
- Split with Pumice (2009)
- Grouper/City Center with City Center (2009)
- Tsuki No Seika Volume One with Xela (2009)
- Roy Montgomery/Grouper - featuring Grouper's Vessel EP - with Roy Montgomery (2010)
