= Duster discography =

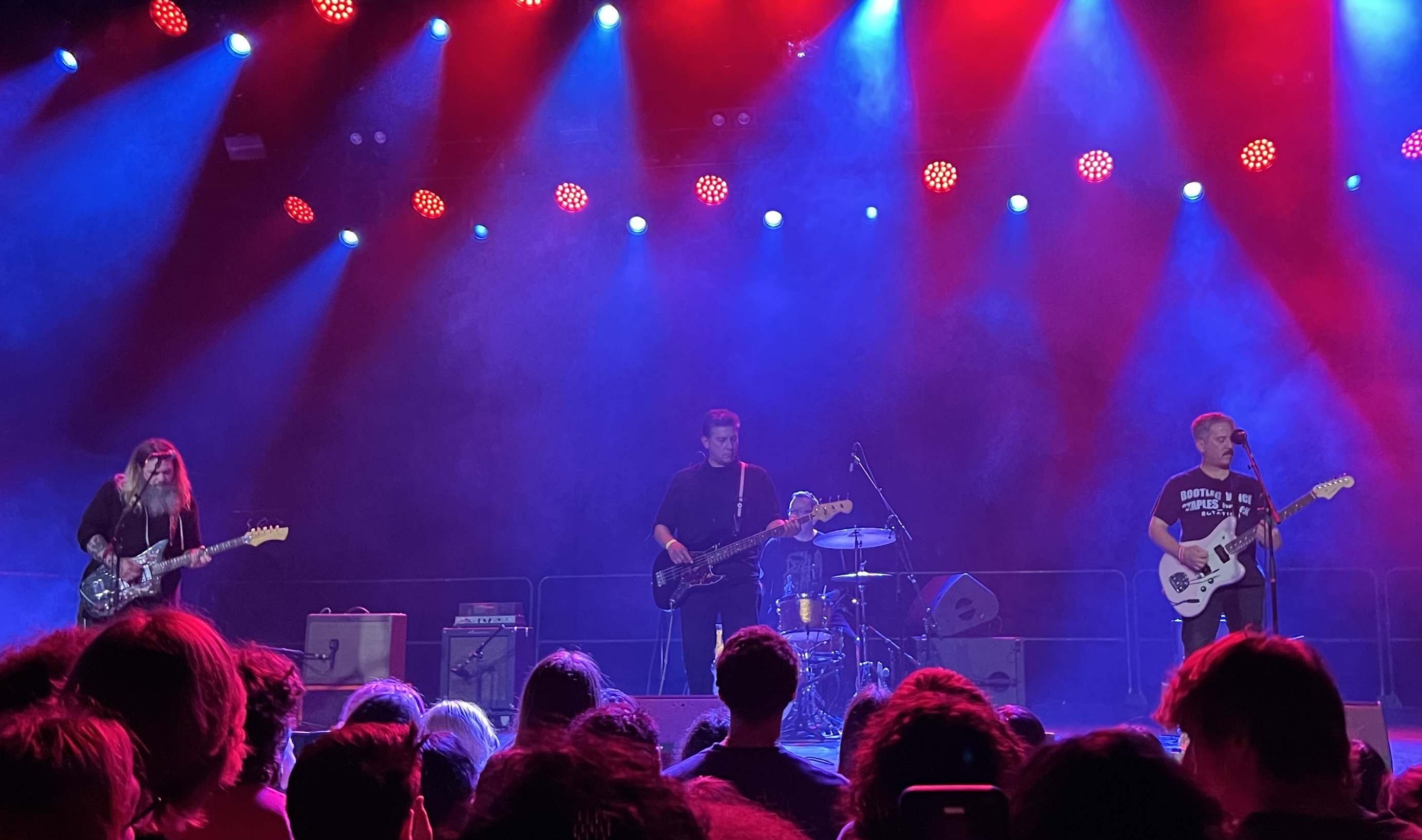
- Duster performing in 2023.
- Studio albums: 7
- EPs: 8
- Compilation albums: 3
- Singles: 7
- Music videos: 12

The discography of indie rock band Duster consists of seven albums, eight EPs, three compilations, seven singles, 12 music videos, and various appearances on compilations.

Rising from the ashes of post-hardcore bands Mohinder and Calm, the band formed in 1996 in San Jose, California. The band's first two releases, Christmas Dust and On the Dodge were also released that year, being demo tapes spread around to friends of the band, with On the Dodge being released by Unleaded Records. The following year, the group put out their first release on Up Records, the Transmission, Flux EP. Additionally, the band released an album, Dweller on the Threshold, under the Valium Aggelein pseudonym. In 1998, the band released their debut album under the Duster name, Stratosphere, along with the Apex, Trance-Like EP released by Skylab Records and the final Valium Aggelein release, Hier kommit der schwartze Mond. 1999 saw the release of the 1975 EP. In 2000, they released their second album Contemporary Movement. The band fell silent following the release and tour for the album, resurfacing in 2003 only for their first music video for "Me and the Birds" from Contemporary Movement. In 2005, they played their final show and dissolved, with members moving on to focus on other projects like Helvetia.

In 2018, the band announced they were back in the studio recording new music. Later, Numero Group announced they would be reissuing the band's discography as the Capsule Losing Contact compilation, released in March 2019. In July, the band put out their first new music since 2000, the "Interstellar Tunnel" single, coming with the announcement of their third album, Duster, releasing later that year. 2020 saw the release of Black Moon, a compilation of the band's works under the Valium Aggelein name. In 2022, the band quietly released their fourth album, Together, by releasing music videos for songs on their YouTube page. The album was also notable for being the first non-archival release from The Numero Group.

In 2024, the band once again silently released their fifth album, In Dreams, again released through Numero Group.

== Albums ==
Title	Release info
Dweller on the Threshold	1997; Released under the Valium Aggelein name; Astronavigation; Cassette; Reissued in 2010 by The Static Cult Label
Stratosphere	February 24, 1998; Up Records; CD, vinyl, cassette (Numero Group, 2022)
Hier kommt der schwartze Mond	1998; Released under the Valium Aggelein name; Audioinformationphenomena; Vinyl
Contemporary Movement	August 22, 2000; Up Records; CD, vinyl, cassette (2022)
Duster	December 13, 2019; Muddguts Records/Numero Group; Vinyl (Muddguts), CD/cassette (Numero)
Together	April 1, 2022; Numero Group; CD, vinyl, cassette
In Dreams	August 30, 2024; Numero Group; Digital

== EPs ==
Title	Release info
On the Dodge	1996; Unleaded Records; Cassette
Christmas Dust	1996; Self-released by the band; Cassette
Transmission, Flux	1997; Up Records; 7"
Apex, Trance-Like	1998; Skylab Records; 7"
1975	1999; Up Records; CD, 12"
Experimental Dust	May 6, 2018; Self-released; SoundCloud-exclusive release of bootleg
On the Air	September 16, 2018, recorded December 17, 1997; Self-released; SoundCloud-exclusive release of bootleg
Testphase, Tape One	September 16, 2018; Self-released; SoundCloud-exclusive release of bootleg
Rarities	September 18, 2018; Self-released; SoundCloud-exclusive release of bootleg

== Singles ==
Title	Release info
"Capsule Losing Contact"	September 9, 2018; Digital
"What You're Doing to Me"	January 15, 2019; Numero Group; Digital
"Copernicus Crater"	October 31, 2019; Muddguts; Digital
"Letting Go"	December 1, 2019; Muddguts; Digital
"Hell's Breaking Loose"	February 28, 2020; Self-released; Digital
"What Are You Waiting For"	February 18, 2022; Self-released; Digital
"Anhedonia II b/w Ecstasy Cowgirl"	August 12, 2024; Numero Group; Digital; Collaboration with Dirty Art Club

=== Other certified songs ===
Year	Single	Certifications	Album
1997	"Stars Will Fall"	RIAA: Gold	Transmission, Flux
1998	"Inside Out"	RIAA: Platinum	Stratosphere
2000	"Me and the Birds"	RIAA: Gold	Contemporary Movement

== Compilations ==
Title	Release info
Capsule Losing Contact	March 22, 2019; Numero Group; Vinyl, CD
Black Moon	September 18, 2020; Released under the Valium Aggelein name; Numero Group; Vinyl, CD
Moods, Modes	February 24, 2023; Numero Group; Vinyl
Remote Echoes	November 17, 2023; Numero Group; Vinyl, CD, cassette

== Music videos ==
Song	Release info
"Me and the Birds"	2003
"Interstellar Tunnel"	2019
"Lomo"	2019
"Drifter"	2022
"Escalator"	2022
"Feel No Joy"	2022
"Making Room"	2022
"Sad Boys"	2022
"Sleepyhead"	2022
"New Directions"	2022

== Appearances on other releases ==
Year	Song title	Release	Label
1996	"East Reed"	The Patio Collection Volume 2	Smilex Records
1997	"Orbitron"	Up in Orbit!	Up Records
1998	"Closer to the Speed Of Sound"	Up Next!	Up Records
1998	"Capsule Losing Contact"	Zum Audio Vol. 2	Zum
1999	"And Things Are Mostly Ghosts (Version Overdose Mix)"	Ambiedexirous	Wichita

== Bootlegs ==
Through the early to mid 2000s, several unofficial collections of the band's material, mostly of unreleased and demo material, surfaced online. Many of the songs were sourced from The Static Cult Label's website.

Title	Release info
Testphase, Tape One	1997; Officially released by the band in 2018
Live in San Francisco	1999
Experimental Dust	2000; Officially released by the band in 2018
Rarities	2001; Officially released by the band in 2018
Low Earth Orbit	2004
On the Air	2008; Officially released by the band in 2018
Live in San Diego	2020
Grounded	2021
Meowmeow	2022
Live at Union Transfer	2023

== See also ==
- Duster (2) discography at Discogs
