= List of riot grrrl bands =

The following is a list of notable bands associated with riot grrrl from the early 1990s to the present, mainly in the United States and United Kingdom.

NB: some of these bands significantly pre-dated the original riot grrrl era (e.g. Frightwig, Fifth Column, Mecca Normal, Scrawl, L7), while others may be more accurately categorized as grunge – see also 'foxcore' (e.g. Lunachicks, Babes in Toyland, Dickless, Calamity Jane), alternative rock (e.g. Jack Off Jill), hardcore (e.g. Spitboy, Pantychrist), garage punk (e.g. Red Aunts), queercore (e.g. Tribe 8, Team Dresch, the Third Sex, Sta-Prest, the Butchies, the Need), post punk/no wave (e.g. Erase Errata), digital hardcore (Lolita Storm) or indiepop (e.g. Angelica).

Other bands did not identify with riot grrrl during its first wave of the early 1990s but became associated via personal and artistic connections (e.g. 7 Year Bitch), or by fans and/or the media due to aesthetic and genre similarities (e.g. Hole, the Gits). Such groups have sometimes been called "riot grrrl adjacent". On the same basis, bands continue to be associated with or self-identify as riot grrrl up to the present day. However, the problematisation of riot grrrl, and of its status as music genre, have led to the label being disputed.

A list of notable bands that specifically self-identified as riot grrrl during the initial early 1990s period would be small, potentially including only Bikini Kill, Bratmobile, Heavens to Betsy, Excuse 17, Emily's Sassy Lime, and Lucid Nation in the US, and Huggy Bear, Linus, Pussycat Trash and Skinned Teen in the UK.

== # ==
- 7 Year Bitch

== A ==
- Adickdid
- Angelica

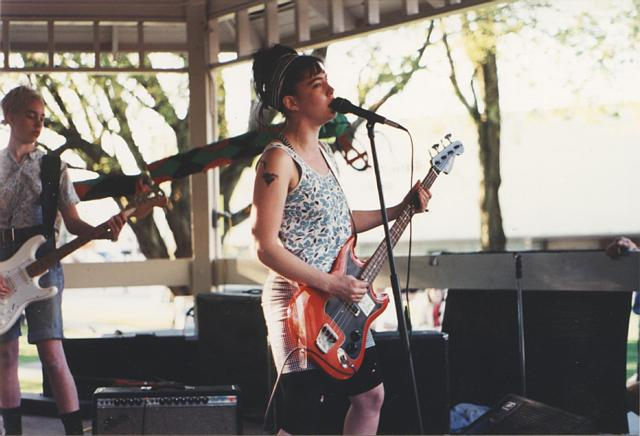
Bikini Kill

== B ==
- Babes in Toyland
- Bangs
- Be Your Own Pet
- Big Joanie
- Bikini Kill
- Bitch Alert
- Blood Sausage
- Bratmobile
- The Butchies

== C ==
- Cadallaca
- Calamity Jane
- Care Bears on Fire
- Cheap Perfume
- Casual Dots
- Childbirth
- The Coathangers
- Cold Cold Hearts
- Coping Saw
- Courtney Love
- Cub

== D ==
- Daddy Issues
- Dickless
- Die Spitz
- Dominatrix
- Dream Nails
- Dream Wife

== E ==
- The Element of Crime
- Emily's Sassy Lime
- Erase Errata
- The Ethical Debating Society
- Excuse 17

== F ==
- Fabulous Disaster
- Fifth Column
- Finally Punk
- Frantic Spiders
- Free Kitten
- Frightwig
- The Frumpies

== G ==
- Girlpool
- The Gits
- Gossip (early)
- Grrrl Gang
- gSp
- GURR

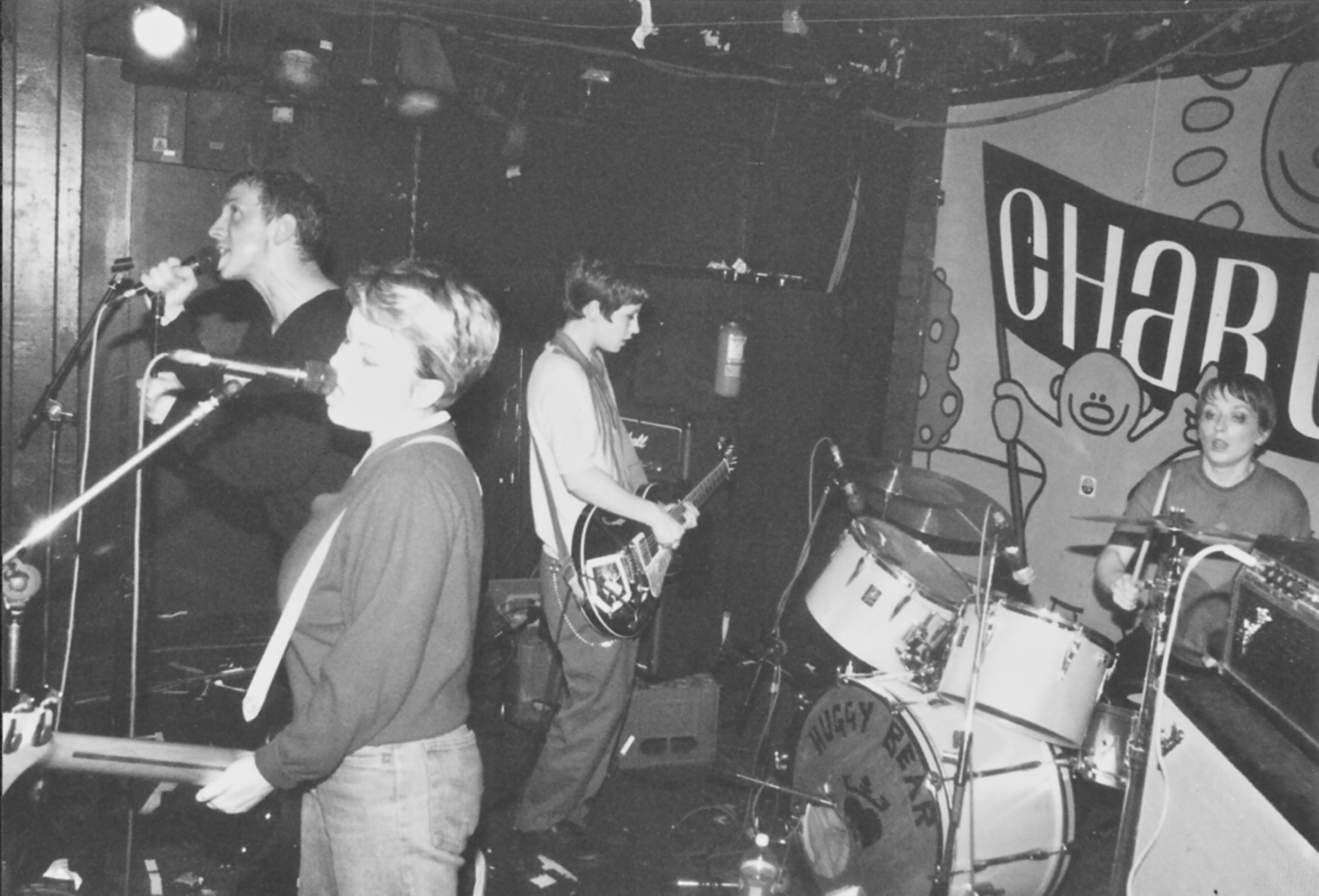
Huggy Bear

== H ==
- Heartless Martin
- Heavenly
- Heavens to Betsy
- Hole (early)
- Huggy Bear

== J ==
- Jack Off Jill
- The Julie Ruin

== K ==
- Kenickie (early)
- Kitten Forever
- Kate Nash (after 2010)
- The Kut

== L ==
- L7
- Le Tigre
- The Linda Lindas
- Linus
- Lois
- Lolita Storm
- Lucid Nation
- Lunachicks
- Lung Leg

== M ==
- Mambo Taxi
- Mecca Normal
- Mika Miko

== N ==
- The Need
- Nots

== O ==
- Otoboke Beaver

== P ==
- Pantychrist
- Partyline
- Period Pains
- Petty Crime
- Phantom Pregnancies
- Pinkshift
- Problem Patterns
- Pussycat Trash
- Pussy Riot

== Q ==
- Quix*o*tic
- The Quails

== R ==
- Red Aunts
- Red Monkey
- The Regrettes

== S ==
- Sally Skull
- Scrawl
- Screaming Females
- The Shondes
- Shoplifting
- Shrag
- Sidi Bou Said
- Sister George
- Skating Polly
- Skinned Teen
- Skinny Girl Diet
- Slant 6
- Sleater-Kinney
- Slutever

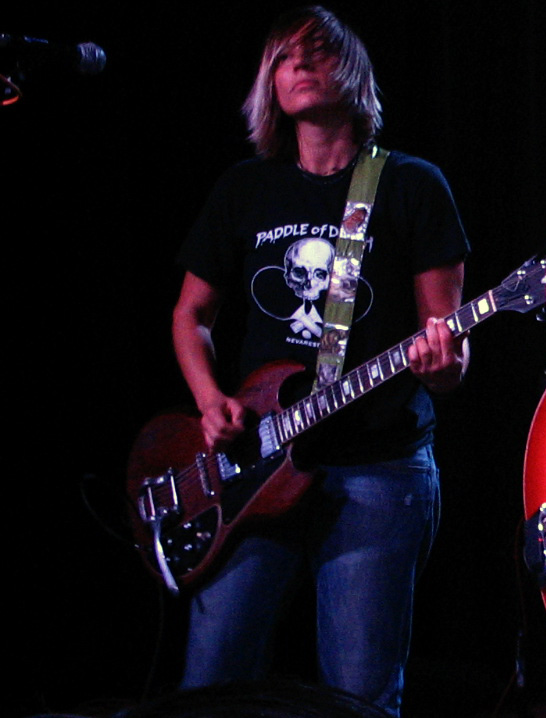
Kaia Wilson of Team Dresch, and also Adickdid and the Butchies

- Spider and the Webs
- Spitboy
- Splendora
- Sta-Prest
- Suture
- Swan Island

== T ==
- Tacocat
- Tattle Tale
- Team Dresch
- The Third Sex
- Throwing Up
- Tribe 8

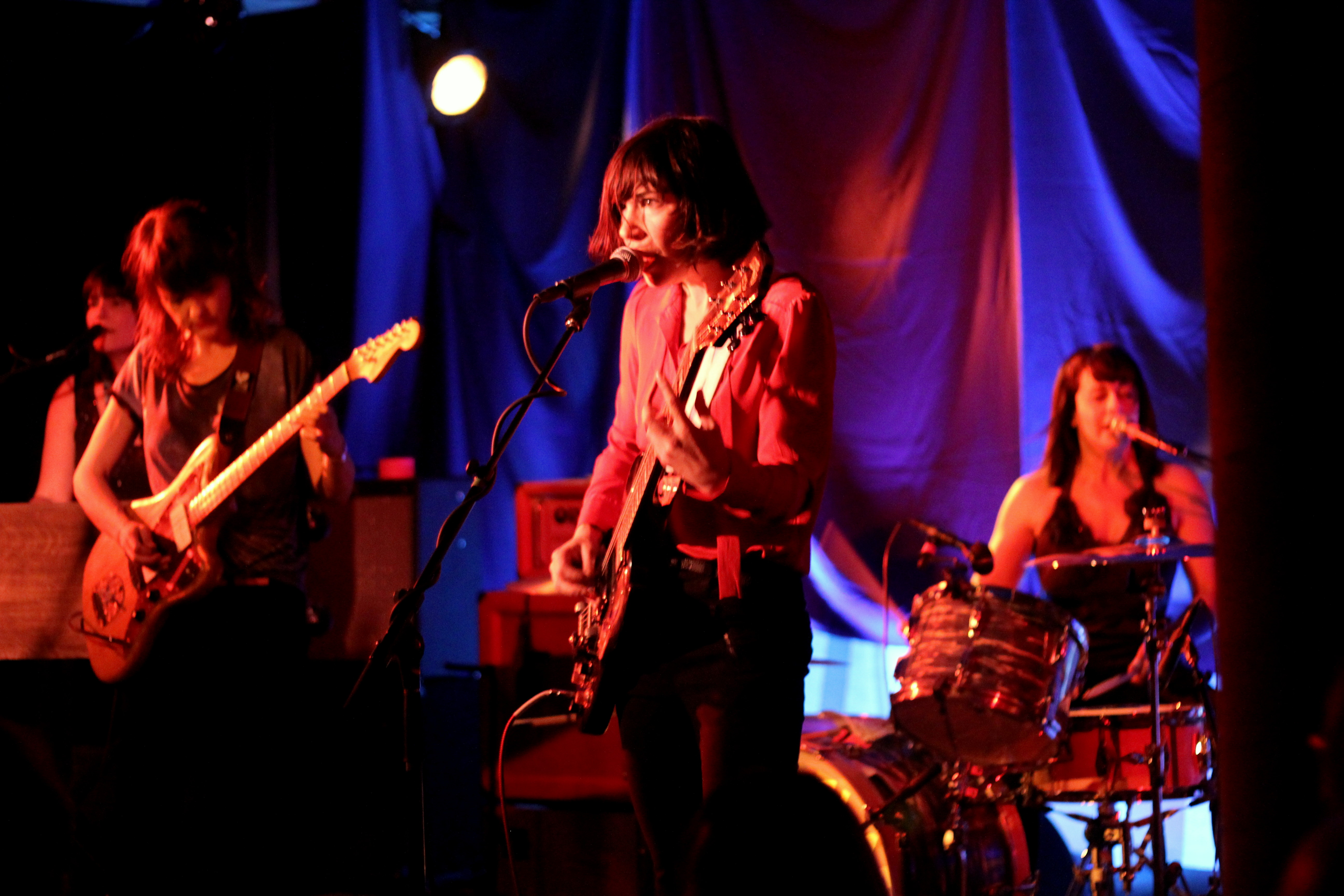
Wild Flag

- Tunabunny
- The Tuts

== V ==
- VIAL
- Voodoo Queens

== W ==
- Wetdog
- Wild Flag
- White Lung
- The Wimmins' Institute

== See also ==
- Queercore
- All-female band
