= Foxcore =

Rock music genre

Foxcore is a 1990s rock music genre of bands featuring female singers. According to Joanne Gottlieb and Gayle Wald, the term was coined as a joke by Thurston Moore during the early 1990s to describe a wave of loud and aggressive female-fronted bands that was occurring at the time. Failing to understand Moore's humorous intent, and confusing it with the Riot Grrrl movement of that era, the media picked up on the term.

The term was criticized by Courtney Love in a 1991 interview for CKUT Radio for being sexist and tokenizing.

== List of foxcore acts ==
- 4 Non Blondes
- 7 Year Bitch
- Babes in Toyland
- Cake Like
- Creamers
- Dickless
- The Donnas
- Free Kitten
- The Gits
- Hole
- L7
- Lunachicks
- Luscious Jackson
- Mudwimin
- The Muffs
- The Murmurs
- Picasso Trigger
- Red Aunts
- Stone Fox
- STP
- Sugarsmack
- Teen Angels
- That Dog
- Veruca Salt
- Zuzu's Petals

== See also ==
- Grunge
- List of riot grrrl bands
- Riot grrrl
