= Irving Force =

- Birth name: Adam Skog
- Born: Stockholm
- Genres: Synthwave, black metal, retro style
- Website: https://irvingforce.bandcamp.com/

Irving Force (real name Adam Skog) is a synthwave producer from Stockholm, Sweden. He previously was a member of the black metal bands Vanhävd and Vapenlicens, before becoming interested in 80's-influenced film scores.

== Works and style ==
Irving Force's musical and aesthetic style is influenced by 1980's action films and characters, such as John Carpenter films and his character Snake Plissken. Skog originally intended Irving Force to have a more pop oriented sound, but the music soon took on elements from his heavy metal past.

He also cites cyberpunk science fiction from all types of media and the band Tangerine Dream as further influences. Having come from a film-score background, much of Irving Force's music is designed to have some sort of narrative or story element - such as his 2015 release The Violence Suppressor. A video was filmed for the title track on that album, which was made to invoke classic sci-fi and action movies like Assault on Precinct 13 and Judge Dredd. Following releases were set out to take place in a loose thematic universe.

In April 2020, Irving Force provided the soundtrack for the Android retro point & click adventure game Awaken Alone. His music has been described by reviewers as "guiding the listener through cyberpunk narratives that twist and mutate with a musical playfulness". Others have praised its "next level grooves" and "balls to the wall rhythms".
