= Juned =

Juned was an all female Seattle band which formed in 1993. It comprised Dale Balenseifen and Claudia Groom on guitars and vocals, Leslie Hardy on bass and Lenny Rennalls on drums. Nalini Cheriel (Adickdid) was also a member at one point. They were signed up by Up Records and released "So White" (a 7" single) and the album "Juned" in 1994, the single "Possum" in 1995 and the CD "Every Night For You" in 1996.

In 1995 they toured with Dinosaur Jr. featuring producer J. Mascis which lead to their discovery by filmmaker Allison Anders. Anders was filming quasi-bio-pic Grace of My Heart at the time and had the girls play the part of a 1960s girl group including their contribution of a song "Groovin' on You" which appears nowhere else other than the soundtrack.

After touring with Dinosaur Jr. they broke up in 1996.
