= Stratosphere (Duster album) =

Studio album by Duster
- Released: February 24, 1998
- Studio: Low Space Orbit (San Jose, California)
- Genre: Space rock; slowcore; indie rock; shoegaze
- Length: 53:52 (CD); 49:20 (LP)
- Label: Up
- Producer: Duster; Phil Ek

Duster chronology
Stratosphere (1998)	Contemporary Movement (2000)

Stratosphere is the debut studio album by the American rock band Duster, released on February 24, 1998, through Up Records. Written and recorded primarily by founding members Clay Parton and Canaan Dove Amber, the album was produced at Low Space Orbit, the band's home studio using analog equipment and a minimalist, lo-fi approach. Blending elements of space rock, slowcore, indie rock, and shoegaze, Stratosphere is characterized by its subdued vocals, sparse arrangements, and atmospheric textures. Though it initially received little mainstream attention, the album later garnered recognition for its distinctive sound and emotive restraint, and has since been considered an influential work in the lo-fi and slowcore genres.

Despite its initial obscurity, Stratosphere developed a cult following in the years after its release, largely through online music communities and collector platforms such as Discogs, Reddit, and Rate Your Music. Its scarcity in physical formats and the band's elusive image contributed to a growing mystique, which was amplified by consistently positive retrospective evaluations. The album's increasing demand led to a major reissue campaign by archival label Numero Group in 2019, alongside Duster's return from a nearly two-decade hiatus.

== Background ==
Duster was formed in 1996 in San Jose, California, as a collaboration between multi-instrumentalists Clay Parton and Canaan Dove Amber. The two musicians had previously played together in the short-lived screamo band Mohinder, a project known for its intense and "chaotic" sound. While dramatically different from Duster's later material, the emotional intensity of Mohinder has been cited as an early influence on the band's more restrained but evocative aesthetic.

Following the formation of Duster, Parton and Amber began recording music in a home studio they dubbed Low Space Orbit. Working primarily with inexpensive analog equipment, the duo developed a distinct lo-fi production style. Their earliest material was distributed on self-released cassettes, including Christmas Dust (1995) and On the Dodge (1996), which captured skeletal home recordings and formative experiments in minimalism and texture. Several of these early tracks were later compiled in the archival release Remote Echoes.

In 1997, Duster released the EP Transmission, Flux through Up Records, a Seattle-based independent label. Around this time, they also issued the single "Apex, Trance-Like" on Skylab Operations. The band briefly operated under the name Valium Aggelein for the release of Black Moon, a more abstract and ambient-leaning project influenced by 1970s German experimental music.

== Recording and production ==
We were broke and used what we had available to us. A bunch of songs came together on cassette four-track machines, and then on 16-track tape machines, so there was an inherent limitation there compared to recording now.

—Clay Parton, Vice, 2018

Stratosphere was primarily recorded in a makeshift home studio the band referred to as Low Space Orbit, a converted living room space that reflected the band's minimalist and resourceful ethos. The recording process was led by multi-instrumentalists Clay Parton and Canaan Dove Amber, with Jason Albertini contributing drums to several tracks. The sessions were defined by a lo-fi approach, with most of the material recorded on inexpensive analog equipment, including four-track and eight-track tape machines.

The album's production lends a raw and intimate sonic quality described as "brittle", "spotty", "tender", and "messy", its guitars often layered with tape hiss and reverb to create a sense of spatial depth. Jason Albertini joined as a guest during the sessions for Stratosphere, contributing to several tracks and later becoming a permanent member of the group. The album's cover is a photograph taken from a November 1970 issue of Life taken by Sam Ehrlich in Alberta, Canada.

== Musical style ==
"Heading for the Door"
A sample of the second track, "Heading for the Door".

Stratosphere combines elements of space rock, slowcore, indie rock, and shoegaze, contributing to a sound often described as both minimalist and atmospheric. It explores themes of departure from routine and movement into unfamiliar or expansive spaces, including travel, flight, and exploration. The album is widely regarded for its distinctive blend of genres, characterized by a lo-fi aesthetic and introspective atmosphere. Tim Sendra has noted its compositions that juxtapose melancholic ballads and expansive, ambient textures.

Stylistically, Stratosphere draws comparisons to a range of the 1990s indie scene. Elements of emo, noise rock, and post-rock are also present, although the band maintains a distinct identity by avoiding genre extremes such as heavy feedback or extended improvisation. The opening track "Moon Age" has been described by Ian Cohen of Stereogum as a "late adapter of that odd '90s infatuation with astral lounge music", echoing the lo-fi, analog approach of groups like Stereolab and Air. Duster's restrained melodicism has been compared to Red House Painters and Low, with their approach seen as a quieter, more fractured counterpart to the era's broader slowcore movement.

The music is defined by slow tempos and "uncluttered drumming". Vocals are often "mumbled" or "faint", typically mixed low against the instrumentals and delivered in a restrained, almost conversational tone. The instrumentation favored simplicity and restraint; guitars alternate between clean, melodic passages and distorted, fuzzy tones, which has been likened to that of the Velvet Underground, Sonic Youth, Bedhead, and the New Year, while its atmospheric sensibilities evoke My Bloody Valentine and Galaxie 500. Drumming remains sparse and understated, with Dylan Nicole Lawson in Everything Is Noise characterizing it as "dim", while Cole Quinn from The Daily Evergreen referred to it as "slow" and "quiet".

With the entrance of the guitars on "Heading for the Door", the album shifts into a more defined sound that Cohen likened to the work of other 1990s indie acts. "The Landing" conveys themes of travel and transformation. Tracks like "Echo, Bravo" feature ringing feedback and sludgy, melodic distortion. Songs such as "Inside Out" use somber, quiet guitar passages to create a sense of warmth, characterized by a brisk tempo, lo-fi production, and subdued, hard-to-discern vocals.

== Release ==
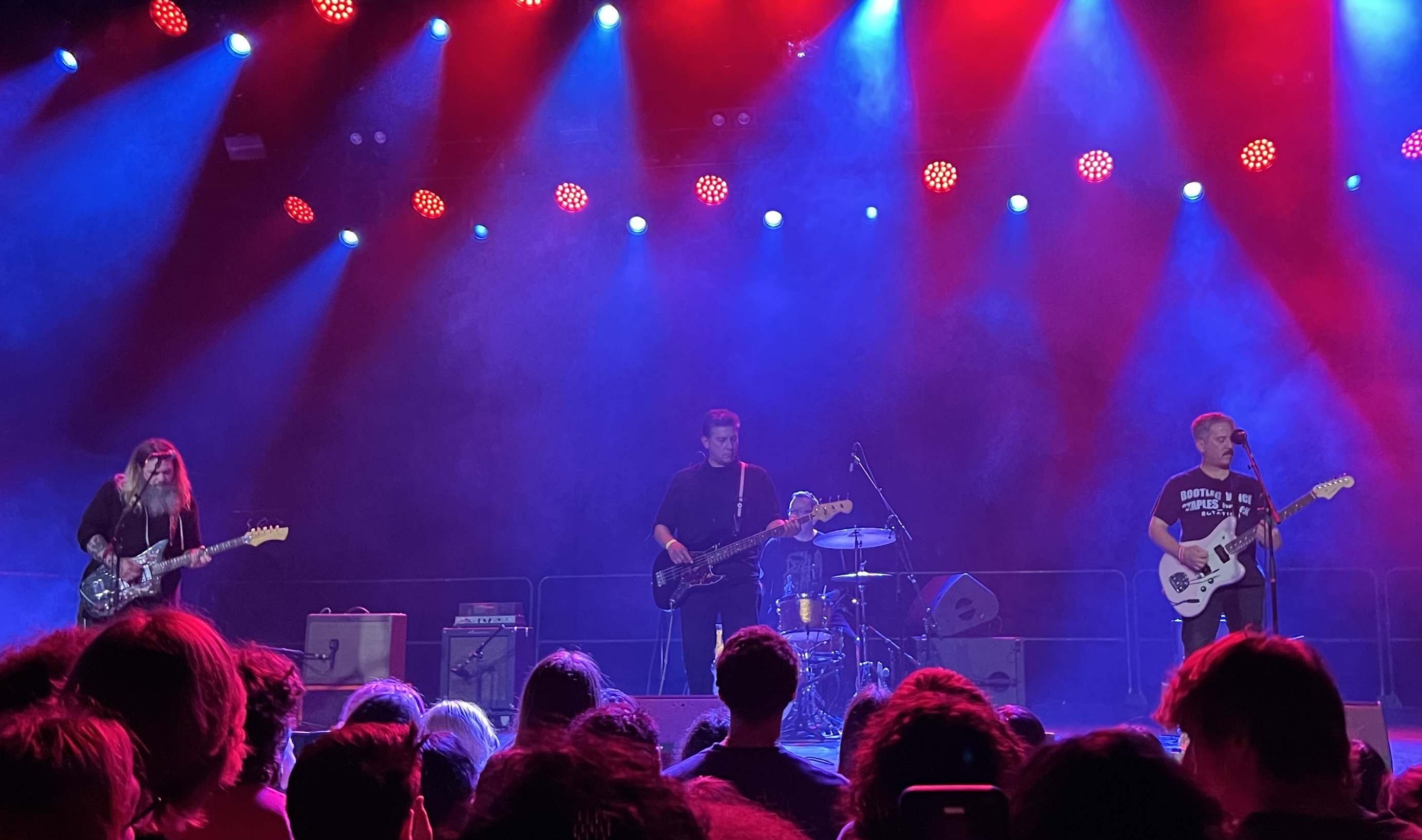
Duster performing in 2023

Stratosphere was released on February 24, 1998, through Up Records. Although it received little mainstream attention upon release, it was retrospectively described by Dominik Böhmer in Everything Is Noise as having been "criminally neglected". Though it garnered modest praise in independent music circles and online publications such as Pitchfork, Duster remained obscure at the time. Following the album's release, drummer Jason Albertini joined as a core member, and the trio issued the 1975 EP in 1999, followed by their second studio album, Contemporary Movement, in 2000. That same year, the group unofficially disbanded. During the subsequent 17-year hiatus, band members pursued separate projects: Amber and Albertini formed the experimental group Helvetia; Parton launched the solo project Eiafuawn and established a small label to support both ventures.

In the years following its release, particularly between the 2010s, Stratosphere developed a cult following among online message boards. Circulating through online platforms such as Discogs, Reddit, Rate Your Music, YouTube, forums, and skateboarding videos, Stratosphere and the band's broader discography began to attract renewed attention. Vinyl pressings of the album became increasingly sought-after, with some copies selling for several hundred dollars. Responding to this resurgence, Duster began collaborating with archival label Numero Group, which released a comprehensive box set, Capsule Losing Contact, in March 2019, followed by reissues of their original albums and EPs. The label has produced 14 different vinyl editions of Stratosphere. That same year, Duster unexpectedly returned with a self-titled studio album, marking their first new material in nearly two decades. To support Duster, the band embarked on a national tour, bringing on Scott Plouf, formerly of Built to Spill, as their live drummer, while Jason Albertini transitioned to bass. The tour included several sold-out dates.

In September 2023, Numero Group released a 25th-anniversary edition of Stratosphere. Alongside the reissue, the label also released a surprise compilation of home-recorded demos titled Remote Echoes. To commemorate the anniversary, Numero Group launched a vinyl copy of Stratosphere into space. The label streamed the launch live on YouTube and provided real-time updates on social media platforms.

== Reception and legacy ==
Professional ratings
Review scores
Source	Rating
AllMusic	5/5 stars
The Daily Evergreen	9/10
Pitchfork	8.6/10

On its release, Mark Richard-San from Pitchfork wrote a favorable review of Stratosphere, describing it as "dirty and distorted" but "as pretty as a gaseous sunrise on Venus," with "dreamy vocals...floating at you from across the void". The Olympian's Tucker Peteril wrote that, though the music was "not stunning in its originality", Stratosphere was "a joy to listen to", and commended Duster's ability to balance subtlety with simplicity. Paul Primrose of The Rocket praised Duster's ability to craft a cohesive and conceptually unified album rather than a mere collection of songs.

In retrospective reviews, AllMusic's Tim Sendra gave the album a perfect score, describing it as "aptly named", noting its ability to navigate "outer space and inner space" with a drifting, exploratory tone. Sendra compared with band with Codeine and called "Echo, Bravo" the "highlight of the record". Writing for CBS News, Kevin L. Jones described Stratosphere as a "highly influential" debut that has continued to resonate with listeners decades after its initial release. He characterized the album as "chock full of simple, slow indie/shoegaze songs" that alternate between "very loud and heavy" and "whisper quiet" dynamics.

Prior to the 2020s, Duster was regarded as a niche act. Critics such as Ian Cohen from Stereogum in 2018 described them as a "low-key legacy" and "your favorite indie band's favorite indie band". Music journalist Mark Richardson noted in 2019 that the group "are not, were not, and never will be, a 'big' band". Stratosphere has since been referred to as a "cult classic" and an influential entry in the lo-fi and slowcore genres. The band's renewed visibility in the 2020s has been attributed largely to the social media platform TikTok, where content tagged #duster accumulated over 1.3 billion views by December 2023, a figure comparable to other widely recognized musical acts. On December 3, 2025, "Inside Out" was certified Platinum by the RIAA, recognizing one million equivalent sales of the song. The album has since been cited as an influence on artists and bands such as Ricky Eat Acid, Peaer, Girlpool, Hovvdy, Ovlov, and Alex G. The solo project Sign Crushes Motorist, created by Liam McCay, has cited Duster as a primary influence, with the project name itself referencing a Duster song.

== Track listing ==
All tracks are written by Clay Parton and Dove Amber.

Stratosphere track listing
No.	Title	Length
1.	"Moon Age"	1:06
2.	"Heading for the Door"	3:08
3.	"Gold Dust"	2:06
4.	"Topical Solution"	5:01
5.	"Docking the Pod"	1:51
6.	"The Landing"	2:43
7.	"Echo, Bravo"	4:32
8.	"Constellations"	3:43
9.	"The Queen of Hearts"	4:20
10.	"Two Way Radio"	0:19
11.	"Inside Out"	2:21
12.	"Stratosphere"	6:58
13.	"Reed to Hillsborough"	4:01
14.	"Shadows of Planes"	1:50
15.	"Earth Moon Transit"	4:24
16.	"The Twins / Romantica"	3:43
17.	"Sideria"	1:48
Total length:		53:52

- "Echo, Bravo" is omitted from LP pressings of the album.

== Personnel ==
Credits are adapted from the album's liner notes.

Duster

- Dove Amber (credited as C. Amber) – performance, production, mixing
- Clay Parton (credited as E. Parton) – performance, production, mixing
- Jason Albertini – drums (tracks 2, 9, 13)

Technical

- Phil Ek – production (tracks 2, 9, 13, 15)
- Kip Beelman – assistant production (track 3)
- Chris – assistant production (track 3)
- Jeff Pinn – recording (tracks 4, 14)
