= Teen Angels (American band) =

American grunge rock band

Teen Angels was an American grunge rock band. It was formed by singer Kelly Canary and another former member of the band Dickless, drummer Lisa Smith, along with Julie Ransweiler. Nalini Cheriel (Adickdid) was also a member at one point. They released two EPs on Scooch Pooch, and then a single and an album (Daddy) on Sub Pop.

Daddy was released on January 16, 1996. It was produced by Jack Endino. Eddie Spaghetti, of Supersuckers, plays guitar on a few songs.

== Critical reception ==
Billboard thought that "Teen Dream"'s "screaming vocals and screeching guitars loudly send the message that this female trio is nobody's pinup."

AllMusic wrote of Daddy: "The songwriting is pretty accomplished, though 1996 was a little after-the-fact for the grunge sound ... the Teen Angels have a knack for thrashy hooks and start/stop dynamics, but they lack the gifted pop genius of a Black Francis or a Kurt Cobain." Trouser Press wrote that the production "pulls a clear rock instrumental sound out of the punk trio’s pit, but Canary’s industrial-strength hollering is the take-it-or-leave-it factor in deciding whether or not to try this toe-dipping descent into sonic splattercore."

== Discography ==
- "Jesus Is On My Side", Scooch Pooch, 1994
- "The Early Years", Scooch Pooch, 1995
- "Teen Dream", Sub Pop, 1995
- Daddy, Sub Pop, 1996
