= The Makers (American band) =

American rock band

The Makers are a garage rock band from Spokane, Washington, formed in 1991, with releases on Estrus Records, Sub Pop Records, and Kill Rock Stars Records.

== History ==
For their first few albums, the members were credited with the surname "Maker", a la the Ramones. They became known for their anarchic performances, travelling between gigs in a 1965 Pontiac hearse. The band's first release was the 10" "Hip-Notic" on the Sympathy for the Record Industry label, the band moving to Estrus Records for their debut album, Howl! (1993). Further releases followed on Estrus, their last album on the label, Psychopathia Sexualis, introducing a retro-glam sound, the band members also adopting new pseudonyms, Michael Machine, Don Virgo, Jay Amerika, and Jamie Jack Frost. 2000 saw the band move to Sub Pop, releasing the Rock Star God album. They moved again in 2004, to Kill Rock Stars.

== Members ==
- Michael Maker: vocals
- Donny Virgo: bass
- Jamie Frost: guitar
- Timothy Killingsworth: guitar
- Aaron Saye: drums

Former Members John Gunsaulis: Harmonica, Vocals

Former Member: "Jungle" Jim Chandler: Drums

== Discography ==
=== Singles ===
- "Yeah Yeah Yeah" (Dionysus)
- "Here Comes Trouble" (Estrus, 1994)
- "I Can't Stand It" (Estrus, 1994)
- "I Just Might Crack" (Estrus, 1994)
- "Hip-Notic" (10" EP, Sympathy For The Record Industry, 1994)
- "Devil's Nine Questions" (1994)
- "Music To Suffer By EP" (Estrus, 1995)
- "This Is The Answer" (1995)
- "Tour Single '95" (1995)
- "Tear Your World Apart" (Estrus, 1997)
- "Tiger of the Night" (Sub Pop, 2001)
- "Matter of Degrees" (Kill Rock Stars, 2005)

=== Albums ===
- Howl (Estrus, 1994)
- All Night Riot (Estrus, 1995)
- The Makers (Estrus, 1996)
- Hunger (Estrus, 1997)
- Psychopathia Sexualis (Estrus, 1998)
- Rock Star God (Sub Pop, 2000)
- Strangest Parade (Sub Pop, 2002) review
- Stripped (Kill Rock Stars, 2004)
- Everybody Rise! (Kill Rock Stars 2005)
