= Land of the Loops =

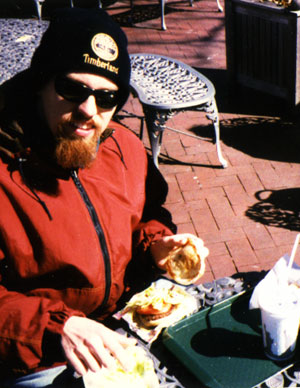
- Alan Sutherland of Land of the Loops

Background information
- Born: Alan Sutherland
- Genres: Rock
- Occupations: Musician; singer; songwriter
- Instruments: Guitar; vocals; sampler

Land of the Loops is the stage name of Alan Sutherland, a musician from Boston, Massachusetts, United States. He began recording in the early 1990s and continues to record today. His music is electronic, makes heavy use of samples and loops, and has an indie rock influence.

== Recordings ==
After four cassette-only releases on the Slabco label, Land of the Loops was signed to Seattle's Up Records. The debut, produced by Tucker Martine, reworked many of the songs on the earlier "Percival" as "Bundle of Joy" in 1996. Among the guest musicians on the album, two songs have vocals by Beat Happening's Heather Lewis. The standout track and advance single on the album, "Multi-family Garage Sale," being licensed by Miller Genuine Draft for a beer commercial.

After two extended play record (EPs), "Refried Treats" (1997) and "Hurry Up and Wait" (1999), Land of the Loops released its second full-length album "Puttering About a Small Land" in 2000. Besides the vocals of Heather Lewis, "Puttering About a Small Land" also features the Japanese singer Takako Minekawa.

=== Commercial uses ===
With its first release on Up Records, the 7" single "Multi-family Garage Sale," Land of the Loops has been successful in licensing its music for commercial uses, with that song being used on a Miller Genuine Draft TV spot. Other music from the album containing the single, "Bundle of Joy," was used on projects from a TV commercial aired in Japan directed by Sofia Coppola to the first song, "Welcome (Back)" played on the first and eighth episodes of HBO's The Sopranos. The song "Heidi Cakes" is played during the credits of Sofia Coppola's short Lick the Star. The album Bundle of Joy as a whole was used as the soundtrack for the movie Lover Girl starring Sandra Bernhard (1997). A remix of "Multifamily Garage Sale" is featured in "Bulgari Unexpected Wonders" commercial (2022).

=== List of recordings ===
- "Straight Out of Milner" Slabco 12
- "True Circles in Jig Time" with Explosion Robinson, Slabco 18
- "Percival" Slabco 23
- "Casiocore" (1994) with Steven and Explosion Robinson, Slabco 26
- "Multi-family Garage Sale/Rotate" (1995) UP011
- "Bundle of Joy" (1996) Up Records UP020
- "Refried Treats" (1997) Up Records UP031
- "Hurry Up and Wait" (1999) Up Records UP074
- "Puttering About a Small Land" (2000) Up Records UP080
- "Single Girl Summer Home (Duplex Mix)/Party Pooper (Pooper Scooper Mix by Buckminster Fuzeboard)" flexi-single (2000) UP092
- "Sippy Cup (featuring Tipsy)" (2003) with Buckminster Fuzeboard, unhip records

== Other work ==
Land of the Loops also worked on soundscores for Lorraine Chapman's Boston-based dance company LCTC which performed "Hand Over the Head" to Sutherland's Japanese-inspired musical score as well as the soundscore for the show "The Floating World" in 2007.
