= Satisfact =

Post-punk band

- Up Records press photo for Satisfact

Background information
- Origin: Bellevue, Washington, United States
- Genres: Post-punk, new wave revival
- Years active: 1996–2002
- Labels: K Records, Up Records
- Past members: Matt Steinke; Chad States; Josh Warren; Dave Schneider; Jeremiah Green
- Website: www.myspace.com/satisfact

Satisfact is an American post-punk band formed in 1996 in Washington State, bridging the post-hardcore movement with the nascent post-punk revival of the 21st century. They created 3 full-length albums which were released on K Records and Up Records.

== Members ==
- Matt Steinke — vocals, guitar
- Josh Warren — bass
- Chad States — synthesizer
- Jeremiah Green — drums

== Discography ==
- The Unwanted Sounds of Satisfact (1996)
- Satisfact (Orange album) (1997)
- The Third Meeting At The Third Counter (1999)
