= Satisfact (album) =

Studio album by Satisfact
- Released: March 18, 1997
- Genre: Post-punk; new wave revival
- Length: 34:03
- Label: K
- Producer: John Goodmanson; Satisfact

Satisfact chronology
The Unwanted Sounds of Satisfact (1996)	Satisfact (1997)	The Third Meeting at the Third Counter (1999)

Satisfact is the second studio album by American post-punk band Satisfact. Co-produced by John Goodmanson, it was released on March 18, 1997 through K Records.

The album features a continuation of the band's trademark post-punk sound of "screechy guitar sounds, hypnotic keyboard effects, robotic rhythms and monotone vocals."

== Critical reception ==
Professional ratings
Review scores
Source	Rating
AllMusic	3/5 stars
NME	6/10

AllMusic critic Mike DaRanco wrote "Suave, laid-back and borderline poppy (but not in the obnoxiously happy sort of way), Satisfact have the ability to accomplish all of this without coming close to boring the listener to death." DaRanco further stated: "They even manage to successfully incorporate a theremin on the track "Demonstration"—that alone is worth giving this record a good review."

== Track listing ==
1. "Misprint" – 3:01
2. "Demonstration" – 2:39
3. "How Things Work" – 3:05
4. "Are You Gifted" – 3:16
5. "Building Tall Buildings" – 2:02
6. "Relay This" – 4:19
7. "Perfect Sleeper" – 2:28
8. "Moods For Moderns" – 1:36
9. "Accent the Motion" – 2:43
10. "Four Sided" – 8:00
11. "Untitled" – 0:48

== Personnel ==
Album personnel as adapted from album liner notes.

- Matt Steinke – vocals, guitar
- Josh Warren – bass
- Chad States – synthesizer
- Jeremiah Green – percussion
- Satisfact – production, photography
- John Goodmanson – production, recording
- Steve Fisk – theremin (2)
- T. Z. Deen – artwork
- James Bertram – photography
