= Duster (Duster album) =

Studio album by Duster
- Released: December 13, 2019
- Recorded: 2018–2019
- Studio: Low Earth Orbit, San Jose, California, U.S.
- Genre: Space rock; indie rock; slowcore
- Length: 45:54
- Label: Muddguts (2019–2022) Numero Group (2022)

Duster chronology
Capsule Losing Contact (2019)	Duster (2019)	Together (2022)

Singles from Duster
- 1. "Copernicus Crater" Released: 31 October 2019; 2. "Letting Go" Released: 6 December 2019

Duster is the third studio album by American rock band Duster. The album was released December 13, 2019 by Muddguts Records in the United States; the first Duster album to not be released under the Up Records label. Duster was also the first studio album released by the band in 19 years since the release of Contemporary Movement in 2000.

On April 13, 2018, Duster posted via their Instagram page that they were "recording a little bit". Later it was announced that the band's discography would be reissued as the box set Capsule Losing Contact through The Numero Group, which was released on March 22, 2019. On July 4, 2019, the band released their first standalone single in almost 20 years "Interstellar Tunnel" (the track was not included on Duster), and subsequently announced their third self-titled studio album, which was released on December 13 that year.

== Critical reception ==
Professional ratings
Aggregate scores
Source	Rating
Metacritic	85/100
Review scores
Source	Rating
AllMusic	4/5 stars
Pitchfork	7.4/10

Upon its release, Duster received positive reviews from music critics. At Metacritic, which assigns a normalized rating out of 100 to reviews from critics, the album received an average score of 85, which indicates "universal acclaim", based on six reviews. AllMusic critic Tim Sendra praised the band for its ability to deliver quality music after such an extended hiatus: "At a time when almost every band ever has reunited to make disappointing, derivative music, Duster have come back to make their most sonically challenging and emotionally invested record yet".

== Track listing ==
All tracks are written by Clay Parton, Dove Amber, Jason Albertini.

No.	Title	Length
1.	"Copernicus Crater"	4:49
2.	"I'm Lost"	2:48
3.	"Chocolate and Mint"	4:52
4.	"Summer War"	4:39
5.	"Lomo"	2:44
6.	"Damaged"	2:20
7.	"Letting Go"	3:55
8.	"Go Back"	3:47
9.	"Hoya Paranoia"	5:18
10.	"Ghoulish"	4:27
11.	"Ghost World"	3:17
12.	"The Thirteen"	2:57
Total length:		45:54
