= Guns of Nevada =

American rock band

- Origin: Seattle, Washington, USA
- Genres: Cowpunk
- Years active: 2007–Present
- Label: PIG Records
- Members: Earle Thunders; Donnie Lemmon; Bruce Shattuck; Doug Lynch
- Website: GunsofNevada.com

Guns of Nevada is an American rock band, formed in Seattle in 2007. Guns of Nevada's music has been featured in three independent films and on the CMT reality show, Chopper Challenge where the songs "Outlaws" and "Hard to Wave Goodbye in Handcuffs" were showcased in the summer of 2008. They've played The Gorge Amphitheatre in Washington alongside singers such as Joe Cocker, Tom Petty, and Toby Keith.

== History ==
=== First releases (2007-2010) ===
The first album was self-titled and recorded at the Chicken Shack Studio in Seattle by Tom Rickell. It was mastered by local producer Jack Endino(Nirvana) and after its October 13, 2008 release was picked up by podcasts and indie radio nationally and in some European markets. In January 2010 Donkey Punch Films used "Hard to Wave Goodbye in Handcuffs" for a scene in the indie film A First Time for Everything.

The band recorded their sophomore effort, Church of Bloody Mary in May 2010 once again at the Chicken Shack Studios with Tom Rickell. Green and Lynch left in December 2010 to pursue their respective side projects. Lemmon and Thunders recruited a Seattle area musician and venue manager to play bass, and drummer John Holme joined the band. Church of Bloody Mary was released on January 1, 2011. Lemmon parted ways due to scheduling conflicts in April 2011 and William Perry took over guitar duties.

=== Songs in the Key of Whiskey (2011-2012) ===
The band began working their third release Songs in the Key of Whiskey at the Doghouse Studios in Seattle with Scott Riley producing. William Perry left in November 2011, and Riley came aboard to finish the guitar tracks and stayed on as permanent guitarist. Soon after John "Jet" Pagano joined on bass. The lineup of Thunders, Riley and Holme recorded Songs in the Key of Whiskey in the fall and winter of 2011-2012 and released it officially on February 24, 2012. In March 2012 they signed with the Spoondog Entertainment Group and later that spring John Pagano re-recorded all the bass guitar parts that would end up on the official, final release of Songs in the Key of Whiskey. In July 2012 they played the Roxy Theatre in Hollywood, California. In August 2012 they performed at the Watershed Music Festival.

=== Singles and reunion (2013-2015) ===
The band released three singles in 2013: "Sometimes the Devil Wins", "Ugly," and a new version of their signature song "Hard to Wave Goodbye in Handcuffs". In 2014 they contributed four songs to the soundtrack for the movie Angel's Bounty, which was released in summer 2014. On May 9, 2014, the original members consisting of Thunders, Lemmon, Green and Lynch reunited to play a benefit show for victims of the Oso mudslide that occurred in Washington state on March 22.

After the four original members of Guns of Nevada began working on new material for a 2016 release, by August 2015 they had signed with PIG Records, known for distributing bands such as the Misfits, GG Allin, Raw Power, DOA and The Accüsed. In September 2015 Adam Green stepped down and Bruce (Spike) Shattuck took over bass duties. They recorded their next record at Orbit Audio in Seattle, Wa. Joe Reineke (The Meices/Alien Crime Syndicate) engineered and produced. They invited Ron "Rontrose" Heathman (Supersuckers/Hangmen) to play guitar on one of their songs and he eventually played on a total of four songs. They released the record "Damned and Adored" on July 9, 2016

== Original Members ==
- Earle Thunders – vocals, guitar
- Adam Green – bass, vocals
- Donnie Lemmon– guitar, vocals
- Doug Lynch- Drums

Former Members: Adam Green Scott Riley John Holme John Pagano

== Discography ==
=== Albums ===
- Guns of Nevada (2008)
- Church of Bloody Mary (2010)
- Songs in the Key of Whiskey (2012)
- Damned & Adored (2016)

=== Singles ===
- "Sometimes the Devil Wins" (2013)
- "Ugly" (2013)

== Videography ==
- "Outlaws" (2012)
- "My Bible and My Gun" (2012)
- "End of the World" (2015)
