= Lucid Nation =

American experimental rock band

- Origin: Los Angeles, California, United States
- Genres: Experimental rock, riot grrrl
- Years active: 1995–present
- Members: Tamra Lucid, Ronnie Pontiac
- Past members: Patty Schemel, Greta Brinkman, Larry Schemel

Lucid Nation is an American Los Angeles-based experimental rock band formed in 1995 made up of Tamra Spivey (stage name Tamra Lucid) and Ronnie Pontiac.

== Biography ==
Lucid Nation was formed in Los Angeles in 1994, when founding drummer, Debbie Haliday, joined Spivey and Ronnie Pontiac to form a riot grrrl band. An early show was in a downtown LA art gallery opening for Team Dresch, followed by a show opening for Bikini Kill in Montebello. Lucid Nation toured the West Coast next, playing seven riot grrrl conventions in one summer. They also backed Warhol superstar Holly Woodlawn at several live shows.

At Koo's Anarchist Cafe in Santa Ana, California the band played matinees promoted by Peace Punk and McCarley, including Food Not Bombs fundraisers. At these shows they became acquainted with the local Black Panther Party, which had renamed itself New Panther Vanguard Movement. The New Panther Vanguard Movement helped distribute Lucid Nation zines including Eracism to prisons all over the western United States.

Lucid Nation turned to Tia Sprocket, formerly of Sexpod, who was on a break from touring with Luscious Jackson. After the tour, the band (Spivey and Pontiac) invited Sprocket to write and record with them back in L.A. Spivey's former bass teacher, Margaret "Grit" Maldonado (bassist of Girl Jesus), began playing with them. Two songs from DNA "Las Vegas the Instrumental" and "Fun" were later chosen by Sasha Grey for two scenes in avant garde porn filmmaker Jack the Zipper's "Naked and Famous".

== 2000s ==
In 2000 Lucid Nation put out another collection of recordings from the DNA sessions called Suburban Legends, a totally improvisational album. The album got the attention of Randy Roark (assistant to Allen Ginsberg for sixteen years) who was interested in Spivey's writing. In 2002 Laccoon Press released "Dialogue of a Hundred Preoccupations" by Roark and Spivey.

In 2002 the band came out with a double CD of improvised songs named Tacoma Ballet. Patty Schemel (of Hole) volunteered to play drums and Greta Brinkman (of Moby's backing band) was on bass. Larry Schemel of Death Valley Girls and Midnight Movies played guitar. Diane Naegel was recruited on keyboards and Lucid Nation recorded the whole album in Tacoma, Washington at Uptone Studio. There were no rehearsals, and Naegel had never played with a band before. The band recorded fifty-two tracks, thirty-two of which ended up on the album. Recording ended on September 10, 2001, and several of the songs foreshadowed 9/11 including the phrase "homeland security" and the chorus "everything's falling down" from the song "Fall." After some rearrangement, the songs were revealed to depict a story about a girl who realized the hypocrisy of her town, her family, and herself. Tacoma Ballet was broken into two discs of sixteen songs each. The first was labeled What is the Answer? and the second one was named What is the Question? (inspired by the final words of Gertrude Stein). The album gained critical praise from Rolling Stone and Magnet. Tacoma Ballet hit #8 most added on the College Music Journal charts in July 2002.

In 2008 Lucid Nation headlined RockNRead at the VirginMega on Hollywood Boulevard where they covered a protest song written by Alex Maranjian called "Bring My Brothers Home".

== 2010s ==
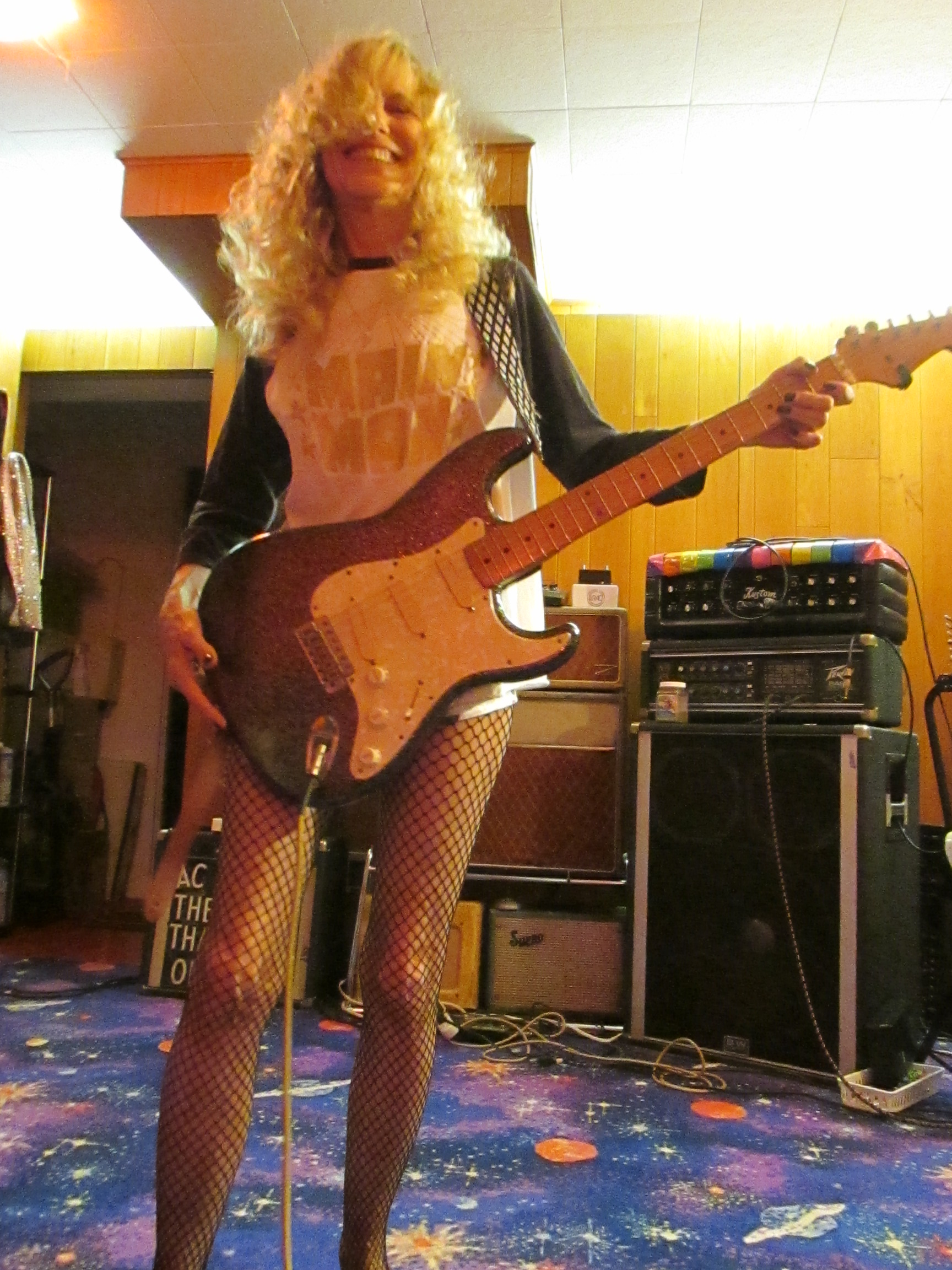
Tamra Spivey at rehearsal in 2016

In 2011 Rookie included Lucid Nation in "Girl Germs", its list of favorite riot grrrl songs.

In Jan. 2015 Rookie included Lucid Nation in its list "Staying Power: Music that endures."

In February 2017 the band released a live video of the cover song "You Can't Put Your Arms Around A Memory" by Johnny Thunders, in honor of Tia Sprocket, drummer on the band's DNA and Suburban Legends records, who had recently died.

In early 2018 Lucid Nation released Ecosteria, an 18-song record, on Bandcamp, Tidal, Amazon, Apple Music, Spotify, Rhapsody, Pandora Radio, and Slacker Radio.

In July 2025, Spivey died during a sudden hospitalization. She is survived by her husband, Pontiac. Just prior to her death, Spivey and Pontiac had finished writing the non-fiction book The Unobstructed Way (which was eventually published in 2026).

== Reviews ==
Rolling Stone wrote "If Spivey sounds spacey, she's not. Her songs range from aggressive, screaming punk to beautifully melodic rhythm and blues, the very definition of garage rock. Like Sleater-Kinney and Bikini Kill -- Lucid Nation has opened for both -- her band's music is raw, poetic, sloppy and infectious...simply bare-bones, kick-ass rock and roll."

Mario Mesquita Borges of Allmusic wrote "Lucid Nation's creations expose fierce streams of experimentalism within the rock genre by captioning a singular set of conceptual alternative pop/rock style, somehow following a similar trail as the one unclosed by Sonic Youth... "

== Discography ==
=== Albums ===
- The Stillness of Over, 1997.
- American Stonehenge, 1998.
- DNA, 1999.
- Suburban Legends, 2000.
- Tribeca Shockwave, 2001, unreleased.
- Nonpoetic Rain: Live on KXLU, 2001.
- Tacoma Ballet, 2002.
- Public Domain, 2006.
- Ecosteria, 2018.
- Last of the Teens, 2019.
- Ghosts of Laurel Canyon, 2020.

=== Compilations ===
- Public Domain: The Best of Lucid Nation, 2006.
  - FUBAR, single, 2005, included in this compilation.

== Filmography ==
=== Films ===
- The Gits, 2005. Associate Producers.
- Cohen on the Bridge, 2012, Executive Producers, Writers.
- Grrrl, 2013. Producers.
- Viva Cuba Libre: Rap is War, 2013. Executive Producers.
- 99%: The Occupy Wall Street Collaborative Film, 2013. Digital Archiving.
- Edward James Olmos Presents Exile Nation: The Plastic People, 2014. Producers.
- End of the Line: The Women of Standing Rock, 2021. Associate Producer.
