= Duster (band) =

American indie rock band

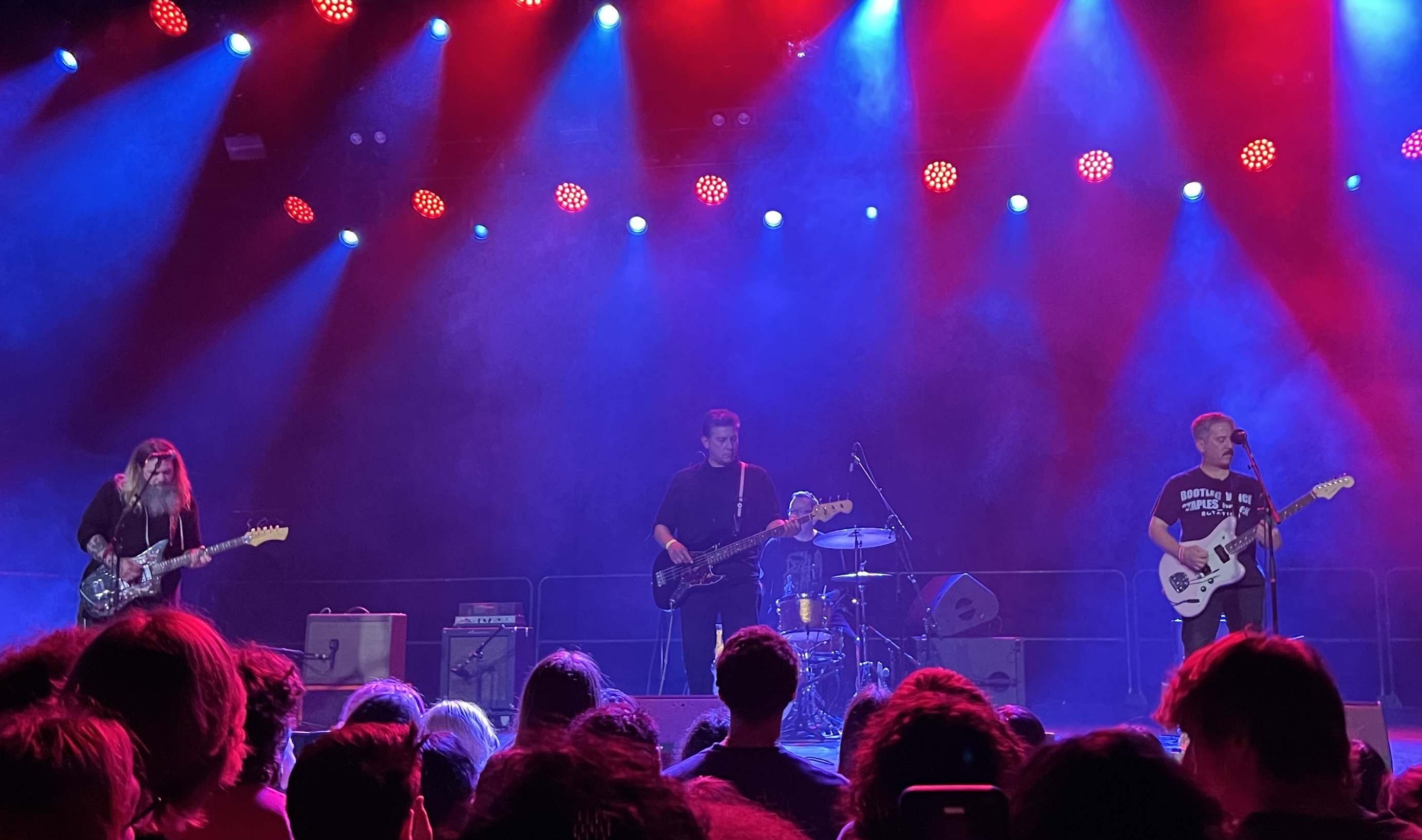
- Duster performing in New York in 2023

Background information
- Also known as: Valium Aggelein (1997-98)
- Origin: San Jose, California, U.S.
- Genres: Indie rock; lo-fi; slowcore; space rock revival
- Works: Duster discography
- Years active: 1996–2005; 2018–present
- Labels: Up; The Static Cult; Skylab Operations; Mudd Guts; Numero
- Members: Clay Parton; Canaan Dove Amber
- Past members: Jason Albertini
- Website: Bandcamp

Duster is an American indie rock band, formed in San Jose, California in 1996. For most of its history, the group consisted of multi-instrumentalists Clay Parton and Canaan Dove Amber alongside drummer Jason Albertini before Albertini left the band in 2022.

The band released two albums, Stratosphere (1998) and Contemporary Movement (2000) before going inactive. In 2018, Duster began recording new music and returned to performing live soon after.

Duster were closely associated with the burgeoning slowcore and space rock revival movements during the 1990s. The band received an unprecedented level of popularity in the 2020s, attributed to the usage of their songs on TikTok.

== History ==
The band was initially formed by Clay Parton (born Ewing Clay Parton, July 29, 1975) and Canaan Dove Amber (born March 7, 1976) in 1996.

Parton and Amber, who had previously worked together in the bands Mohinder and Calm, self-released two cassettes that year, On the Dodge and Christmas Dust, a 7", Transmission, Flux, on Up Records in 1997, as well as another 7", Apex, Trance-Like on Skylab Operations/Smoothlips in 1998. In 1998, Jason Albertini joined as the band's drummer, playing on three songs for the band's debut album Stratosphere. Beginning with 1999's 1975 EP, Albertini became much more involved in the group's process, playing many more instruments and sharing recording/producing credits with Parton and Amber. By 2000's Contemporary Movement, he was fully involved in the creative process as a permanent member of the group. In 2000, Up Records founder Chris Takino died of leukemia. While recording a new album, the band split up in 2005, and began to pursue solo projects. Parton started a record label, The Static Cult, which released his new project Eiafuawn as well as Albertini's band Helvetia. Amber and Albertini relocated to Seattle.

On April 13, 2018, Duster posted via their Instagram page that they were, "recording a little bit". The band played their first show in 18 years on December 14, 2018, opening for Alex G at Warsaw in Brooklyn, New York. They also played two headlining shows at Baby's All Right in Brooklyn on the next two days, where they debuted new material. The band's discography was reissued in March 2019 through the Capsule Losing Contact boxset on The Numero Group. On July 4, 2019, the band released their first standalone single in almost 20 years, "Interstellar Tunnel", and subsequently announced their third self-titled studio album, which was released on December 13 that year.

Of their hiatus and subsequent reunion, Parton said, "When we took a break almost two decades ago, we didn't think it was going to all completely stop. We thought we could keep it drifting at least, maybe at a slower pace and with a different process. But everything just went dark. We were always in touch and sometimes we'd talk about doing Duster things, but days just piled up... In recent years we've talked more seriously about at least doing another record. Now everything is sort of working out, and we are making new things together, but we're taking it slow and still doing most things wrong, so it does feel like right where we left off."

On March 31, 2022, the band surprise-released their fourth studio album Together through several music videos on YouTube, with the album becoming available for sale the following day. Following the release, Parton announced that Albertini had left Duster to focus on his indie rock project Helvetia, although Albertini stated in the liner notes of the Bandcamp release of his 2023 album, You shot up past the moon scapegoat, that it was more complicated and his departure was due to mental health.

On August 30, 2024, the band surprise-released their fifth studio album In Dreams.

On January 13, 2026, the band announced that they are "working on something new" in a collaboration with Dirty Art Club. Both performed together during Duster's 2024 tour, with Dirty Art Club often opening at many shows. The post included multiple photographs along with a video containing a snippet of music.

On March 26, 2026, Duster posted on their instagram page confirming their new project with Dirty Art Club. The album entitled Crusher, was released on the name Sooj on April 3rd, 2026.

== Side projects ==
The band released two albums under the pseudonym Valium Aggelein in 1996 and 1997 respectively which were later re-released as a box set, Black Moon, by Numero Group in 2020. Parton has also released music under the pseudonyms Eiafuawn (short for Everything is all fucked up and what not) and the Soviets and played in bands like El Buzzard, Breasts, Parton Kooper Planetarium, Two Boys Alright, Stumpy and Ghost Drugs. Albertini has his own band, Helvetia, that has put out multiple records on Parton's record label The Static Cult Label and has played with Mike Johnson, Built to Spill, Xiu Xiu, and a single show with Queens of the Stone Age. Amber has also released an EP under his name and Lonnie Win.

== Musical style ==
Generally seen as indie rock, the group has been also associated with the space rock revival and slowcore movements by critics due to their unique sound. To produce this, the band typically recorded at their home studio, Low Earth Orbit, on cheap and older recording equipment, such as cassette decks, giving their music a lo-fi quality.

== Legacy ==
In 2019, Vice wrote that, "Before Bandcamp-born songwriters like (Sandy) Alex G and Mitski legitimized inward-peering indie rock for the modern age, Duster penned the operations manual." Paste noted that the internet helped give them more exposure than a small independent label such as Up Records could. Vice also credited Soulseek and Rate Your Music for spreading the band's music.

Duster experienced a surge in popularity during the early 2020s, attributed to their songs being popular on TikTok. This coincided with a broader revival of interest in the shoegaze and slowcore genres with young people, an effect also largely attributed to TikTok. This came as a surprise to music writers; Mark Richardson of The Ringer declared in 2019, after Duster reunited, that "Duster are not, were not, and never will be, a 'big' band." That perception had changed by 2023, when Eli Enis of Stereogum wrote, "Duster are, improbably, a legitimately big band, and their success is directly related to the boom-time that shoegaze and slowcore (the genres they blur) are currently enduring." Enis previously said that "Duster and Sweet Trip are as canonically important to young alt-rockers as the Pixies and Built to Spill were to previous generations."

== Members ==
=== Current members ===
- Clay Parton – instruments, production (1996–2000, 2018–present)
- Canaan Dove Amber – instruments, production (1996–2000, 2018–present)

=== Former members ===
- Jason Albertini – drums, production (1998–2000, 2018–2022)

=== Touring members ===
- Sam Fabela – bass
- Max Edelman – drums

== Discography ==
- Stratosphere (1998)
- Contemporary Movement (2000)
- Duster (2019)
- Together (2022)
- In Dreams (2024)
