= Nalini Cheriel =

American singer

Nalini Deedee Cheriel
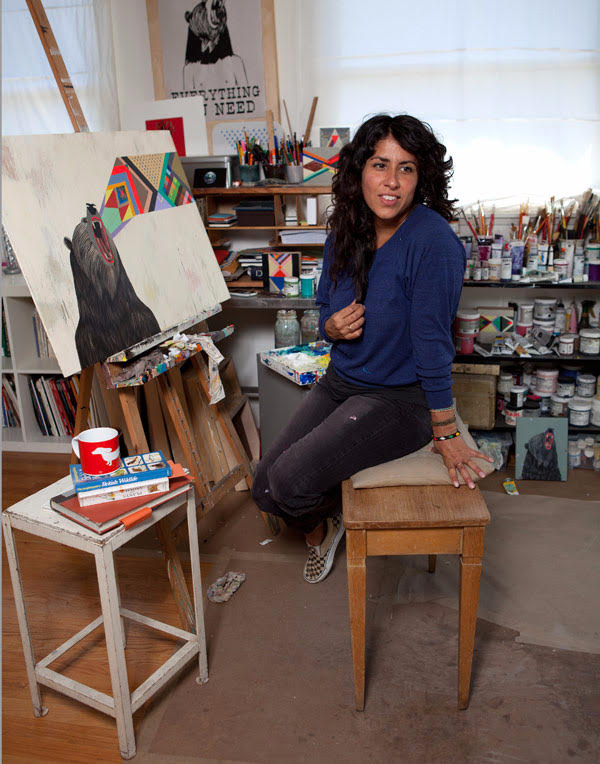

Background information
- Also known as: Deedee Cheriel
- Born: Nalini Cheriel; Eugene, Oregon
- Genres: Punk rock, folk rock, Punk art Contemporary Art Street Art Riot Girrl
- Occupations: Musician, Artist, Filmmaker
- Website: deedeecheriel.com

Nalini "Deedee" Cheriel is a visual artist, musician and filmmaker who lives in Los Angeles, California.

== Career ==
From the age of 19, Cheriel started out creating record covers and T-shirts for the Oregon music scene. She was a member of the band Adickdid, which was distributed by several labels including Yoyo Records and Kill Rock Stars. She also played in the bands Juned, Teen Angels, and The Hindi Guns.

In 2001, Cheriel, along with friends Kurt Voss and Zoe Poledouris, created the film Down and Out With the Dolls. This film is loosely based on Cheriel's life as a musician and the stories she would tell Voss about this time of her life. After this film was released, Cheriel started a band with Voss The Hindi Guns in Los Angeles, California where she lives still.

In Los Angeles, Cheriel continued work as a visual artist, showing at Several Galleries Including New Image Art, erry Karnowski Gallery, and Subliminal Projects. She has created several paintings which continue on the themes she explored in her music, as well as exploring new ones. The main theme of her art, according to Cheriel, would be the attempts of people to connect to the world around them and to each other. Cheriel's interest in the relationship between man and our natural surroundings is apparent from the abundance of animals in her paintings. Cheriel is an environmentalist and political activist using animals to depict human emotions.

== Exhibition record ==
=== 2025 ===
Visual Language: / Subliminal Projects (Los Angeles) February 2025

Fire Relief Show / Gross Gallery/ (Los Angeles) January 2025

=== 2024 ===
Into Action 2024 Chicago, IL August, 2024 Moon & Stars: Los Angeles Asian American Women in Art/ BG Gallery (Los Angeles) May 2024 Artshare: LA Legacy / LA ART SHARE (Los Angeles, CA) April 2024

=== 2023 ===
Artists For ERA / Virginia Museum of History and Culture (Richmond, Virginia) February, 2023 California Dreamin / Dorado 806 Projects (Los Angeles, CA) February, 2023

=== 2022 ===
Modern Folk/ Stephanie Chefas Gallery (Portland, OR) January, 2022 Cat Art Show/ China Town Arts (Los Angeles CA) October, 2022 Art For Peace in Ukraine with Yoko Ono and Cindy Sherman (Venice, CA) April, 2022 25 Year Anniversary Show/ KP Projects (Los Angeles, CA) August, 2022 Neutra / Neutra Museum (Los Angeles, CA) October, 2022

=== 2021 ===
Chauvet Arts (Nashville, TN) August 2021

=== 2020 ===
Witch Women (Venice, CA) February 2020 Dialect to the Eye Andenken/ Holdout Gallery (Portugal) September 2020 Curves at Battalion Gallery (Portugal) Geese Are Never Swans by Eva Clark, illustration for book published by Kobe Bryant

=== 2019 ===
Chroma KP Projects (Los Angeles CA) 2019

=== 2018 ===
- Cosmic Connections World Merry Karnowsky Gallery (Los Angeles) July 2018

We Rise LA (Los Angeles) October 2018

=== 2017 ===
TWENTY-ONE / Subliminal Projects (Los Angeles) June 2017

- When Brown Chicks Take Over the World Merry Karnowsky Gallery (Los Angeles) July 2017

Women of the New Contemporary / Artst Republic May 2017

=== 2016 ===
Deedee Cheriel and Umar Rashid -Frowhawk - Campfire Gallery (SanFrancisco) 2016

- Deedee Cheriel Pure Evil Gallery (London UK) July 2016

Monniker Art Fair London 2018 BLOOM Art Fair/ Battalion Cologne Germany 2016 Art Market Artist Republic (Santa Monica) 2016

=== 2015 ===
- Natural Resource Merry Karnowsky Gallery (Los Angeles) July 2015

Platinum Blend (San Francisco) Modern Eden Project 2015 The Provocateurs Art Alliance (Chicago IL) 2015

=== 2014 ===
- More Than Another Shiny Object Merry Karnowsky Gallery (Los Angeles) July 2014

Spaces // Squared (San Francisco) White Walls Gallery May 2014 Wider Than a Postcard (Portland, Or) Breeze Block Gallery 2014 Affordable Art Fair (London, UK) Coates and Scarry 2014

=== 2013 ===
- Episodes in the Abundant Oasis Merry Karnowsky Gallery (Los Angeles) July 2013
- McCaig Welles Gallery (New York) June 2013
- Moniker Art Fair (London) October 2013
- Little Spirit and Infinite Longing, Pure Evil Gallery (London) March 2010

=== 2012 ===
- AIko, Tara McPherson & Deedee Cheriel: Merry Karnowsky Gallery (Los Angeles) February 2012
- Just Passing Through (Amsterdam, ND) September 2012
- Busy Being (Austin, TX) March 2012
- University Of Milwaukee (Milwaukee, WI) February 2012
- Street Art Show LA ARTS (Los Angeles) April 2012
- Unnatural History (Bristol UK) July 2012
- Unnatural History (Melbourne, AU) April 2012

=== 2011 ===
- Modern Fabulist View Gallery (Bristol, UK) April 2011
- FemkeHiemstra, Audrey Kawasaki & Deedee Cheriel: Merry Karnowsky Gallery (Los Angeles) July 2011

=== 2010 ===
- Abracaabra Merry Karnowsky Gallery (Los Angeles) October 2010
- Art Basel Art Fair McCaig Welles Gallery (Miami) December 2010
- SUBject/ SubJECT Subliminal Projects (Los Angeles) May 2010
- Amsterdam Art Fair: Mauger Modern (London) March 2010

=== 2009 ===
- True Self: Jonathan LeVine Gallery (New York) October 2009
- Beyond Eden: Subliminal Projects (Los Angeles) September 2009
- Lovable Like Orphaned Kitties and Bastard Children: Green Gallery (Milwaukee, WI) May 2009
- Together We Are: Barracuda (Los Angeles) July 2009
- Sunset Junction: LA ART (Los Angeles) August 2009
- Lovable Like Orphan Kitties and Bastard Children: Green Gallery (Milwaukee, WI)
- Print Heavy: NOMAD Gallery (Los Angeles)
- Lovable Like Orphan Kitties and Bastard Children: LACE Gallery (Los Angeles)
- Harmonious Glory: Mei Xue Gallery (Los Angeles/ Beijing)

=== 2008 ===
- Deedee Cheriel and Louise Bonnet: Subliminal Projects (Los Angeles) May 2008
- TBD White Walls Gallery (San Francisco) December 2008
- Cologne Art Fair: McCaig-Welles Gallery October 2008
- Look!: Jail Gallery (Los Angeles) August 2008
  - Deedee Cheriel Recent Works : Stitch Gallery (Tokyo, Japan) December 2008
- New Works: Welles-Rosenthal Gallery (Redwood City) June 2008

=== 2007 ===
- Bridge Art Fair: Art Basel (Miami)
- Into the Stars and Always Up: McCaig Welles Gallery (Brooklyn)
- Tiger in a Tropical Storm: Riviera Gallery (Brooklyn)
- Tall Totem Pole: Gallery 1269 (Los Angeles)
- Fountain Art Fair: McCaig Welles Gallery (New York)
- Bridge Art Fair: Mc Caig Welles (Chicago)
- The Girls Room: Jen Bekman Gallery (New York)
- Jail Weddings: Jail Gallery (Los Angeles)

=== 2005-2006 ===
- Pop, Bang, Slide: Autopsy Gallery (Melbourne, Australia)
- 5ives: Receiver Gallery (San Francisco)
- Market Show: Stall 54 (London)
- Free words: Free Biennial (New York)
- The Group Show: David Allen Gallery (New York)
- 2 Artists: FLUXCO Gallery (Los Angeles)
- Sunset and St. Marks: Capla-Kesting Fine Art (New York)
- Sunset and St. Marks: Capla-Kesting Fine Art (Los Angeles)
- Bridge Art Fair: Art Basel (Miami)
- 1st and Hope: Brian Lotti Space (Los Angeles)

=== 2000-2004 ===
- Street / School Girls: New Image Art Gallery (Los Angeles)
- Hollywood Bowl: Track 16 Gallery (Los Angeles – with Kenny Scharf and Ed Moses)
- ArtPolitix: ArtSpace (Los Angeles)
- Street notes: Blue Box (London)
- Salon Du Petit: Gallery 825 (Los Angeles)
- Small Creatures: Dirt Gallery (Los Angeles)
- Ms. Understood: Planet 24 Gallery (Portland)
