= The Unwanted Sounds of Satisfact =

Studio album by Satisfact
- Released: September 10, 1996
- Genre: Post-punk; new wave revival
- Length: 38:23
- Label: Up
- Producer: Steve Wold

Satisfact chronology
The Unwanted Sounds of Satisfact (1996)	Satisfact (1997)

The Unwanted Sounds of Satisfact is the debut album by American post-punk band Satisfact. Released on September 10, 1996 through Up Records, the album was produced by the musician Steve Wold, better known by his stage name Seasick Steve. The album's sound, which is derived from the post-punk, new wave and gothic rock, has been regarded as an early example of the new wave revival genre.

== Critical reception ==
Professional ratings
Review scores
Source	Rating
Allmusic	3/5 stars

Allmusic critic Blake Butler thought that the album sounded "like the Smiths playing on Jupiter in 2150 with Morrissey's vain sass taken away" and stated: "As this is the band's first album, you hear a more stripped-down and straightforward of what they would later doon future albums." Butler also described the record as "a strong album of dreamy android pop with a 1984 edge." Megan McCarthy of CMJ wrote: "Loud guitar, live drumming, and deep bass create a rock-solid foundation for Chad States' synthesizer, which alternately feeds the frenzy with electronic noise and calms it with the simplest Casio melodies." McCarthy further concluded that the band "would be at peace among the British Factory bands of a decade and a half ago, or perhaps as part of the more obscure German New Wave."

== Track listing ==
1. "First Incision" — 4:37
2. "Escapism for the Future" — 3:20
3. "Dysfunction" — 2:21
4. "50 Mg. Once Daily" — 3:24
5. "Unswitched" — 3:06
6. "Standard Error" — 3:48
7. "Oscillator" — 2:31
8. "When Hearing Fails" — 2:48
9. "Disconnect" — 4:13
10. "Hydrograft" — 4:08
11. "It Will Never Happen" — 4:07

== Personnel ==
Album personnel as adapted from liner notes.

Satisfact

- Matt Steinke — vocals, guitar
- Josh Warren — bass
- Chad States — synthesizer
- Jeremiah Green — drums

Other personnel

- Steve Wold – production, recording
- Seth Warren – violin (4–6)
- Scott Swayze – audio engineering
- Ginger Trump – photography
- Alice Wheeler – photography
