= Jana McCall =

American singer-songwriter

- Origin: Seattle, WA and Bozeman, Montana
- Genres: Rock, pop, grunge
- Occupations: Singer-songwriter, guitarist
- Instruments: Vocals, bass guitar
- Years active: 1990 – 2004
- Label: Up Records
- Website: Jana McCall on Myspace

Jana McCall is an art therapist and American singer-songwriter and visual artist from the Pacific Northwest. She played bass guitar in the short lived all-female band Dickless. After Dickless, she worked briefly with Mark Pickerel (formerly of Screaming Trees) and the band Ruby Doe. Her solo career spanned 1998 to 2002 during which she released two albums; the eponymous Jana McCall and Slumber. She had three songs featured on Up Records compilations.

Jana is a mental health counselor specializing in art therapy in Seattle, Washington. (Jana McCall Expressive Therapy)

== Discography ==
=== Albums ===
- Jana McCall album from Up Records; UP #049 (1998)
- Slumber album from Up Records; UP #094 (2002)

=== Compilations ===
- Days Gone from the Up Records compilation Up In Orbit!; UP #045 (1997)
- Echoes, a cover of the Pink Floyd song., from the Up Records compilation Up Next; UP #060 (1998)
- Bloodlines from the Up Records and Slabco Records compilation US: Up Records and Slabco; UP #079 (2000)
