= Butterfly Train =

American indie rock band

- Album booklet image (black and white version). From left to right, Forrest Orr, Tim Harris, Brett Nelson.

Background information
- Origin: Boise, Idaho, United States
- Genres: post-punk, indie rock
- Years active: 1994–1996
- Label: Up Records
- Members: Brett Nelson (vocals, bass, piano); Forrest Orr (bass, vocals); Eric Penney (guitar); Andy Capps (drums); Ambrose Richardson (bass)
- Past members: Tim Harris (drums); John McMahon (album guest, cello); Todd Dunnigan (album guest, piano)
- Website: www.myspace.com/butterflytrain

Butterfly Train was an indie rock band formed in 1994 in the state of Idaho. It was led by bassist and vocalist Brett Nelson. They created two full-length albums which were released on Up Records.

== Discography ==
=== Albums ===
- Building Distrust From Trust; UP #005 (1994)
- Distorted, Retarded, Peculiar; UP #021 (1996)

=== Singles ===
- Blame Weight b/w Dog Day; UP #004 (1994)

=== Compilation Appearances ===
- Blame Weight from the Up Records compilation Stacked Up!; UP #014 (1995)
