= Rein Sanction =

American rock band

- Rein Sanction c. 1991. From left to right: Ian Chase, Brannon Gentry and Mark Gentry

Background information
- Origin: Jacksonville, Florida, U.S.
- Genres: Grunge; art rock
- Years active: 1981–1993, 1996, 2006
- Labels: W'Sup; Sub Pop; Souldier; Flotation
- Past members: Mark Gentry; Brannon Gentry; Ian Chase; Daren Bedford; Mike Brown; Alex Leeser

Rein Sanction was an American rock band, formed in 1981 in Jacksonville, Florida. Its original lineup consisted of Mark Gentry (vocals, guitar), Brannon Gentry (drums) and Ian Chase (bass). The band's debut, Broc's Cabin, was released in 1991 by Sub Pop.

== History ==
Rein Sanction was formed in the summer of 1981 in Jacksonville, Florida. The original line-up featured Mark Gentry (vocals, guitar), Brannon Gentry (drums) and Ian Chase (bass). Chase was a neighbor of the Gentry brothers. The band was founded during the early teenage years of its members; the earliest version of the band was heavily influenced by contemporary acts such as Joy Division and U2. The band's style soon changed after Mark Gentry started to study jazz and classical and was exposed to the likes of Jimi Hendrix and Hüsker Dü.

Rein Sanction debuted with a self-titled 12-inch EP in 1989. In 1991, the band released its debut album, Broc's Cabin, on Sub Pop. The record was produced by Kramer, the founder of the record label Shimmy Disc. Its follow-up, 1992's Mariposa, was produced by Jack Endino. Both records failed to receive commercial success. Rein Sanction disbanded in 1993; according to bassist Ian Chase, the band broke up "due to health concerns." Rein Sanction reunited with a new bassist to release a self-titled album on Souldier Records in 1996: the record was billed as Mark Gentry & Rein Sanction. The release was accompanied with a tour.

In 2006, the band released a single, titled as "Should Have Known," on Flotation Records. In 2010, Mark Gentry released a full-length, Good One, which featured drum loops as backing tracks; the record is often mistakenly credited to Rein Sanction. Southern Lord Records reissued the band's self-titled debut EP in 2019.

== Musical style ==
The band's sound was heavily compared to that of Dinosaur Jr., with AllMusic's Bradley Torreano describing their as "the same brand of sludge pop." The band's debut, Broc's Cabin, was characterized by guitar distortion and psychedelia; Mark Gentry’s use of wah-wah, distortion and envelope filter was compared to the works of early Meat Puppets and Dinosaur Jr. Gentry's vocal melodies were also compared to those of Hüsker Dü.

== Members ==
- Mark Gentry – vocals, guitar (1981–1993, 1996, 2006)
- Brannon Gentry – drums (1981–1993, 1996, 2006)
- Ian Chase – bass (1981–1993)
- Daren Bedford – bass (1996)
- Mike Brown – bass (2006)
- Alex Leeser – piano (2006)

== Discography ==
Studio albums

- Broc's Cabin (1991)
- Mariposa (1992)
- Rein Sanction (1996)

EPs

- Rein Sanction (1989)

Singles

- "Creel" (1991)
- "Deeper Road" / "R.K." (1992)
- "Should Have Known" / "Jagged Line" / "Up With The Sun" (2006)
