= Dina Martina =

American drag performer

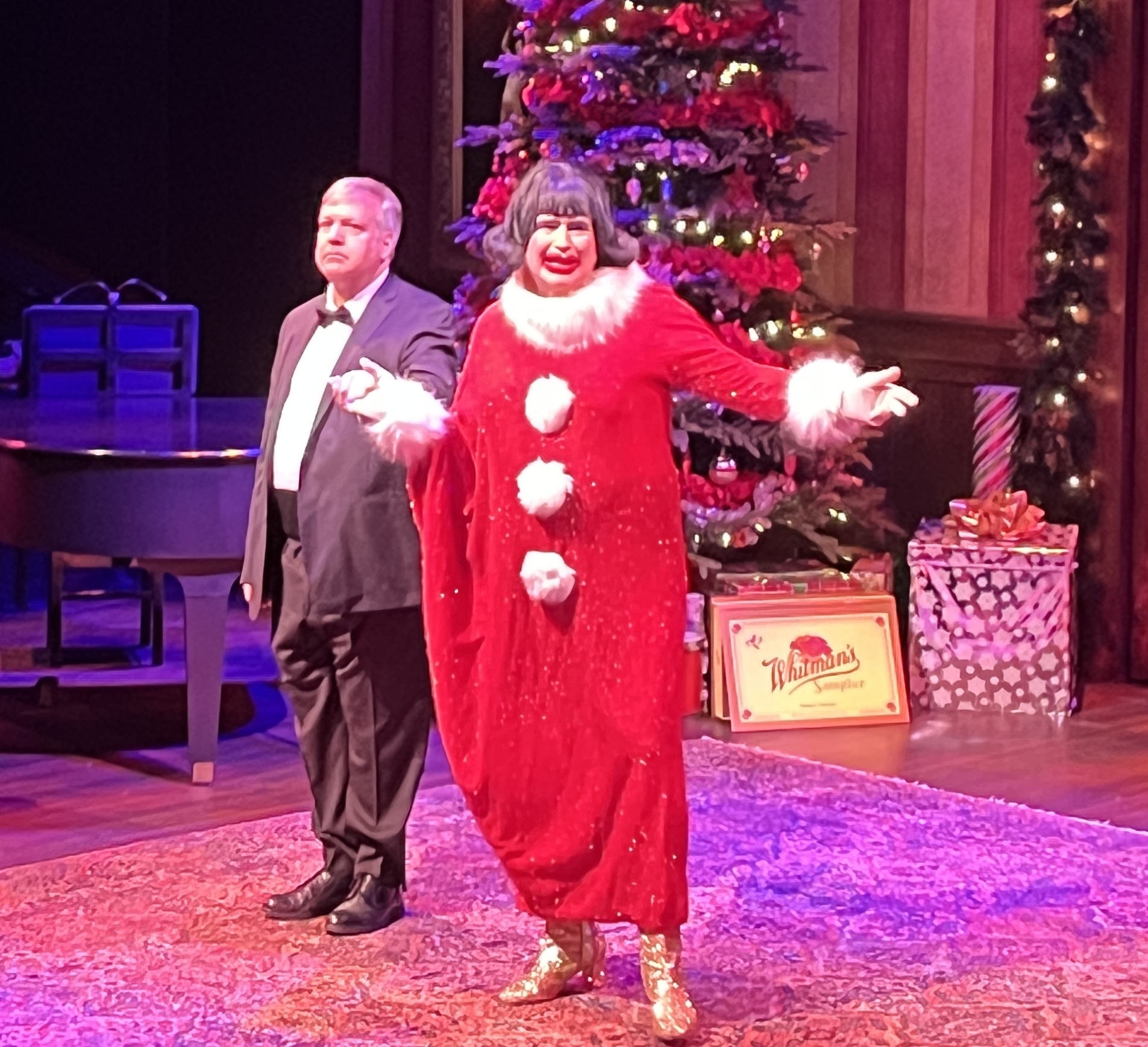
- Dina Martina (right) performing in Seattle in 2022
- Born: Grady West
- Occupations: Drag performer; comedian; dancer; performance artist; singer

Dina Martina is the stage name of Grady West, a drag performer who has also been described as a comedian, dancer, performance artist, and singer.

== Career ==
Dina Martina's shows have included Chariots of Failure, Fine Avec Me, and an annual Christmas production sometimes called Dina Martina Christmas Show.

== Personal life ==
West "splits time" between Seattle and Provincetown, Massachusetts, as of 2020.
