= Sexpod =

Punk rock band

- Origin: Hoboken, New Jersey
- Genre: Punk rock
- Years active: 1992–2004
- Past members: Alice Genese, Karyn Kuhl, Tia Sprocket, Billy Loose, Wylie Wirth

Sexpod was an American punk rock band from Hoboken, New Jersey. They formed in 1992 and disbanded in 2004.

== History ==
Sexpod's original lineup consisted of vocalist and guitarist Karyn Kuhl, bassist Alice Genese, and drummer Billy Loose. Both Kuhl and Genese were previously in the band Gut Bank. Their debut single, "Too Much Hate", was released in 1994. After the release of their debut album, Home (1994), Tia Sprocket (another former member of Gut Bank) replaced Loose on drums, and the band became known as an all-female group. With their second lineup, one reviewer identified the band with the riot grrrl movement and lesbianism, saying "they're not playing cookie-cutter punk rock for kids who think it started with Green Day." A critic described their appearance as "defiant women who wear their love of making heavy loud noise like a badge of honor."

Sexpod signed with the major label CMC International (distributed by BMG Records) for their second album, Goddess Blues (1997). The album featured production from Fred Maher. One of the album's songs, "Foot on the Gas", was featured on the soundtrack to Escape from L.A.. Sexpod played at the Michigan Womyn's Music Festival in the 1990s, although the band never achieved wider mainstream success.

Drummer Sprocket left the band in 1998 and was replaced by Wylie Wirth. By 2004, Sexpod had disbanded permanently as the members focused on other projects.

== Discography ==
- Home (1994, Go-Kart Records)
- Goddess Blues (1997, CMC International)

== Members ==
- Karyn Kuhl – vocals, guitars (1992–2004)
- Alice Genese – bass (1992–2004)
- Billy Loose – drums (1992–1996)
- Tia Sprocket – drums (1996–1998)
- Wylie Wirth – drums (1998–2004)
