= In Dreams (Duster album) =

Fifth studio album by American band Duster

Studio album by Duster
- Released: August 30, 2024
- Length: 43:00
- Label: Numero Group

Duster chronology
| Remote Echoes (2023) | In Dreams (2024) | Crusher (2026) |

In Dreams is the fifth studio album by American indie rock band Duster. A surprise album, it is Duster's second album since drummer Jason Albertini left the band. It was digitally released on August 30, 2024, and a physical version was released on December 6, 2024, via Numero Group.

== Reception ==
Professional ratings
Review scores
| Source | Rating |
|---|---|
| AllMusic | 4/5 stars |
| Pitchfork | 7.1/10 |

Tim Sendra of AllMusic stated "Meant to heal and to comfort, Duster's records have become balm for troubled souls living in turbulent times and In Dreams is exactly that, and very much of a piece with the band's finest work."

Pitchfork's Grayson Haver Currin wrote about the album, "In Dreams isn't at all a crash-landing, but it is a soft one, as Duster settle into a perception of themselves rather than fly above it."

Far Out described several songs from the album as vintage, gritty-sounding, narcotic and profound, while Mojo referred to the album's melodies as "sluggish, warm and desolate, their arrangements spare but affecting." Uncut stated "In Dreams picks up the thread they've been weaving since their 2018 comeback, not too different from their '90s form: shimmering, chipped guitars; resigned, mumbling vocals; a vague sense of astral longing."

== Track listing ==
| No. | Title | Length |
|---|---|---|
| 1. | "Quiet Eyes" | 3:37 |
| 2. | "Aqua Tofana" | 2:57 |
| 3. | "No Feel" | 2:47 |
| 4. | "Starting to Fall" | 3:11 |
| 5. | "Close to Home" | 3:08 |
| 6. | "Isn't Over" | 3:57 |
| 7. | "Cosmotransporter" | 4:18 |
| 8. | "Black Lace" | 2:32 |
| 9. | "Space Trash" | 3:39 |
| 10. | "Baking Tapes" | 2:36 |
| 11. | "Like a Movie" | 4:58 |
| 12. | "Poltergeist" | 3:13 |
| 13. | "Anhedonia" | 2:08 |
| Total length: | | 43:00 |
