= Throwing Up =

English punk band

Throwing Up are an English punk band from London, England, formed in 2010. Members Clare James Clare, and Camille Benett previously played in all-girl four piece Headless. whilst drummer Ben Rayner previously played in such bands as Fading Fast, The Permanent, Shitting Fists, and This Time Around.

NME magazine described Throwing Up as "London's latest DIY shit-storm", whilst Maximumrocknroll said "Throwing Up make super cool snarly stripped-down punk that sounds to these ears like a catchy post-grunge echo of DC’s Chalk Circle mixed with a bit of that lo-fi Messthetics-style hustle bustle".

Their first single "Toothache" was self-released in March 2011, their second single "Mother Knows Best" was released on What's Your Rupture? in October 2011. Their third single "Big Love" was released in March 2012. The band played SXSW in Austin, Texas in both 2011 and 2012.

Their debut album was released on 8 July 2013 on Tim Burgess' O Genesis Records with the single "Medicine" released on 1 July 2013. The album was critically well received and was followed by a tour with the Irish band Fight Like Apes, as well as festival performances over the summer.

== Members ==
- Camille Benett – guitar, vocals
- Clare James Clare – bass, vocals
- Ben Rayner – drums, guitar
- Andrew Moran – drums
