= Snake Plissken =

Fictional character from the films Escape from New York and Escape from L.A.

- Kurt Russell as Snake Plissken in Escape from New York (1981)
- First appearance: Escape from New York
- Last appearance: Escape from L.A.
- Created by: John Carpenter; Nick Castle
- Portrayed by: Kurt Russell

In-universe information
- Nickname: Snake
- Gender: Male
- Title: Lieutenant
- Occupation: Soldier, criminal
- Affiliation: U.S. Army Special Forces

S. D. Bob "Snake" Plissken is a fictional character who served as the protagonist of the films Escape from New York (1981) and Escape from L.A. (1996). Portrayed by Kurt Russell, the character was created by John Carpenter and Nick Castle. An antihero, Plissken is a former U.S. Green Berets lieutenant who served in Russia during World War III, for which he was awarded two Purple Hearts, before turning to a life of crime. In both movies, Plissken is approached by U.S. federal officials, who offers to pardon him if he agrees to perform dangerous missions in New York City and Los Angeles, both of which have been transformed into maximum security penal colonies to contain the criminals that have arisen from the massive increase in crime. The character went on to appear in John Carpenter's Snake Plissken Chronicles, a four-part comic book miniseries released in 2003, and has frequently been referenced in popular culture.

== Fictional biography ==
=== Background ===
S. D. Bob "Snake" Plissken was a former U.S. Green Beret lieutenant who served in the "Black Blight" unit. He was deployed to the Soviet Union as part of World War III between a Sino-Soviet alliance and the United States, where his actions in (then-named) Leningrad and Siberia resulted in him being awarded two Purple Hearts; at the time, he was the youngest serviceman to be decorated by the president of the United States for bravery. Plissken was subsequently discharged from the military and turned to a life of crime, in part due to his belief that he was betrayed by the federal government of the United States during a ruse de guerre in Leningrad which caused him to lose the use of his left eye and the death of Plissken's parents at the hands of the police as part of a failed hostage rescue attempt.

He traveled with his war buddy and only friend, Bill Taylor. Snake took up with partners Harold Hellman (later known as "Brain") and Bob ('Fresno Bob'). In Kansas City around 1993, Hellman apparently let Plissken and Fresno Bob be cornered by police, at which time Fresno Bob was brutally tortured and killed by the police.

After his daring escape from New York, Plissken finds himself in Cleveland, where he meets two new partners in crime — Jack "Carjack" Malone (later known as Hershe Las Palmas) and Mike "Texas Mike" O'Shay. Subsequently, Texas Mike is killed and Carjack is caught. Plissken evades capture and makes his way to the United States territory of New Vegas, Thailand, where he becomes a gunfighter-for-hire. He is eventually apprehended by the United States Police Force and brought to California, where he is scheduled for deportation to Los Angeles ― now an island due to the flooding of the San Fernando Valley in an earthquake, and a place of exile for criminals and undesirables.

As a result of the Kansas City incident, it was widely believed in the criminal community that Plissken is dead. This is a running gag in Escape from New York: "I heard you were dead" (homage to the John Wayne film Big Jake). In Escape from L.A., the recurring joke is changed to "I thought you'd be taller."

Plissken has a tattoo of a cobra on his abdomen. He is skilled in martial arts due to his military training.

=== Personality ===
Snake is shown as being very cynical, most likely due to the hypocrisy of the U.S. government, and appears to be willing to do anything to survive. He is often stated by others to be somewhat of a misanthrope. He is terse, stern in his speech, of few words, and holds nothing sacred or even important. He does, however, hold a loose code of honor, though he tends to be more judgmental of others resorting to questionable acts to survive when it comes at his expense than he is of himself when doing the same to others.

He frequently shows coolness and level-headed thinking under extremely stressful situations. Although he will kill without remorse or hesitation, he does not kill for fun or when it is unnecessary. He is also known for his quick wit and gallows humor.

== Appearances ==
=== Escape from New York ===
Snake was arrested in 1997 after breaking into the U.S. Federal Reserve in Denver, Colorado. He was sentenced to life in New York maximum security prison, that is, the entire island of Manhattan, surrounded by an impenetrable wall, and then abandoned to fall into anarchy. At this time, Air Force One is hijacked and crashes into Manhattan, and the President, played by Donald Pleasence, is captured by the "Duke of New York" (Isaac Hayes), the de facto leader of the prisoners. Bob Hauk (Lee Van Cleef), the United States Police Force Commissioner, offers Snake a full pardon if he will go in and rescue the President. The President carries technical information that would allow the United States to be the dominant world power, but in 24 hours it will become useless. Hauk enforces the time limit by implanting microscopic explosive capsules in Plissken's carotid arteries, which will detonate at the deadline. Plissken rescues the President with the help of Harold Hellman (Harry Dean Stanton) (now known as Brain, and working for the Duke of New York), Brain's "squeeze" Maggie (Adrienne Barbeau), and a taxicab driver nicknamed Cabby (Ernest Borgnine). Only Plissken and the President survive their escape. As the President begins his broadcast speech, Plissken, who is disgusted by the President's evident lack of empathy for the people who died to get him out, walks away, furiously shredding the time-critical information tape.

=== The Adventures of Snake Plissken ===
In January 1997, Marvel Comics released the one-shot The Adventures of Snake Plissken. The story takes place sometime between Escape from New York and before his famous Cleveland escape mentioned in Escape from L.A. Snake has robbed the Centers for Disease Control of some engineered metaviruses and is looking for buyers in Chicago. Finding himself in a deal that is really a set-up, he makes his getaway and exacts revenge on the buyer for ratting him out to the United States Police Force. In the meantime, a government lab has built a robot called ATACS (Autonomous Tracking And Combat System) that can catch criminals by imprinting their personalities upon its program in order to predict and anticipate a specific criminal's every move. The robot's first test subject is America's public enemy number one, Snake Plissken. After a brief battle, the tide turns when ATACS copies Snake to the point of fully becoming his personality. Now recognizing the government as the enemy, ATACS sides with Snake. Unamused, Snake destroys it. As ATACS shuts down, it can only ask him, "Why?" Snake just walks off answering, "I don't need the competition".

=== John Carpenter's Snake Plissken Chronicles ===
Cover of John Carpenter's Snake Plissken Chronicles

Snake Plissken appeared in John Carpenter's Snake Plissken Chronicles, a four-part comic book miniseries released in 2003 that was published by CrossGen comics and Hurricane Entertainment. The story takes place the morning after the events in Escape from New York. Snake has been given a military Humvee after his pardon and makes his way to Atlantic City. Despite the fact the director's cut of the New York movie shows Snake was caught after a bank job, this story has Snake finishing up a second heist that was preplanned before his capture. The job is stealing the car JFK was assassinated in from a casino and then delivering it to a buyer on a yacht in the gulf. The job involves Snake's partnership with a man named Marrs who ends up double crossing him. Left for dead in a sinking crab cage, Snake escapes and is luckily saved by a passing fisherman named Captain Ron. When Ron denies Snake's request to use his boat in order to beat Marrs to the robbery, Snake decides to kill him. But when he ends up saving Ron from a Russian mob wanting money, Ron changes his mind and helps Snake. Once at the casino, Snake comes face to face with Marrs and his men, who arrive at the same time, ending in a high-speed shoot-out. Snake gets away with the car and its actress portraying Jackie Kennedy, leaving Marrs to be caught by the casino owner, who cuts him a deal to bring his car back and live. After some trouble, Snake manages to finally get the car to the buyer's yacht with Ron's boat and is then attacked by Marrs. Following the fire fight the yacht and car are destroyed, Marrs and Captain Ron are dead, and Snake makes his escape in a helicopter with the 30 million credits owed to him for the job. The series is written by William O'Neill, penciled by Tone Rodriguez and edited by Jan Utstein-O'Neill.

=== Escape from L.A. ===
Sixteen years after his escape from New York, Snake is once again enlisted for a similar situation, as the story begins with a similar plotline as was used in Escape from New York. This time, Snake is forced to retrieve a disk for a remote control which controls a series of EMP-style satellites. These devices are positioned around the entire world. The disk is somewhere in Los Angeles. The city had separated from the mainland due to an earthquake in August 2000 and had become an island separate from the United States, which had become a totalitarian theocratic police state. Snake had to retrieve a black box, with which the new President's (Cliff Robertson) daughter, Utopia (A.J. Langer), had entered Los Angeles. The President clearly states he does not care if she is returned or killed, as she is a traitor to his country. Snake initially refuses, but once infected with the plutoxin-7 virus, which will lead to his death in 10 hours, he agrees. Snake retrieves the box and seemingly returns it to the President. However, when the President attempts to activate it, he learns it is not the real box. Snake reveals that he switched the box with a fake, and promptly uses the code "666" to "wipe out all technology" in the world.

== Cancelled projects ==
=== Television series ===
In July 2000, Tribune Entertainment announced plans to adapt Escape from New York into a television series. However, it was canceled in September 2001, due to the September 11 attacks in New York.

=== Chronicles project ===
Along with the comic book, other Snake Plissken Chronicles projects were announced. A Namco-produced video game was announced, but was later cancelled possibly due to the death of Debra Hill. Production I.G was also set to create an anime film based on the property, reportedly based on the Escape From Earth concept by John Carpenter and Kurt Russell, but this also never materialized. Carpenter and Russell would have executive produced, and Russell would have provided the voice and likeness of Snake.

=== Escape from Earth ===
In the 2000s, there was a proposed second sequel, often mentioned by Carpenter and Russell in interviews prior to the release of Escape from L.A. The concept was that Earth was the only place left for Plissken to escape. After Escape from L.A. performed poorly at the box office, the project never materialized.

In August 2006, an Internet rumor suggested that the project was actively being pursued by Paramount at Russell's urging, but the rumor was revealed to be untrue.

=== Escape from Mars ===
It was rumored that in 1996, the script to Ghosts of Mars originally started off as a potential Snake Plissken sequel. Entitled Escape from Mars, the story would have been largely much the same; however, after Escape from L.A. failed to make much money at the box office, the studio did not wish to make another Plissken movie. Snake Plissken was then changed to "Desolation Williams," and the studio also insisted that Ice Cube be given the part. Years later, a tweet confirmed that the rumor was false, and Ghost of Mars was never intended as a sequel.

== Possible future appearances ==
On March 13, 2007, it was announced that Gerard Butler would play the role of Snake Plissken in a remake of Escape from New York. Kurt Russell, as well as many fans, did not approve.

In June 2008, a rumor circulated that the project was proceeding with Josh Brolin as Snake Plissken. However, the project ended up in development hell. On October 12, 2015, 20th Century Fox hired Luther creator Neil Cross to write the film's script. In March 2017, it was announced that Robert Rodriguez will direct the movie. In February 2019, new development surfaced when Leigh Whannell was hired to write a new script, with the option to replace Rodriguez as director.

== References in other media ==
- In Metal Gear Solid 2: Sons of Liberty, Solid Snake uses the alias "Iroquois Pliskin" upon meeting Raiden for the first time. Solid Snake's character was also heavily inspired by Snake Plissken. Kurt Russell was reportedly offered the role of Naked Snake (Solid Snake's genetic progenitor, also known as Big Boss) during the development of Metal Gear Solid 3: Snake Eater, but Russell apparently declined. Regarding his decision to decline such roles, Russell stated: "I'm a movie guy... I come from a different era and I wasn't interested in expanding financially off of something that we had created or that I had created in terms of a character." He further explained that if a project was not written by John Carpenter, "it doesn't smell right," and that he preferred to "go do something new, let's go do something fresh... rather than saying, what can we bleed off of this iconic character?". Carpenter retroactively gave his blessing to Metal Gear creator Hideo Kojima for the adaptation of the character.
- In the video game Bubsy 3D, the character Bubsy shows up dressed like Snake Plissken in one scene.
- The video game Broforce includes the playable character Snake Broskin, referencing Plissken.
- Hoss Delgado In the tv show The Grim Adventures Of Billy And Mandy is a parody 80s action heroes with his design being based on Plisskin
