= Capsule Losing Contact =

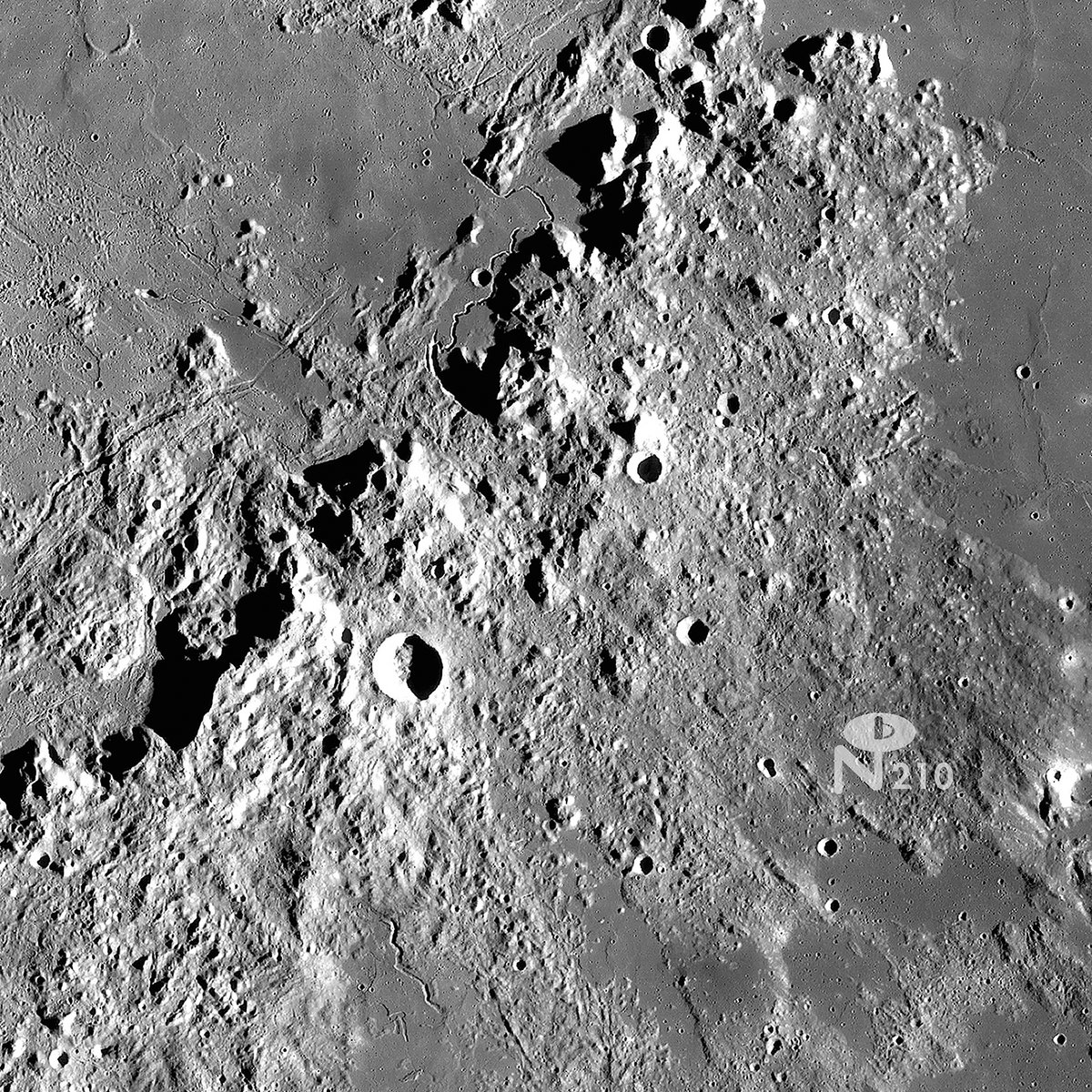

Compilation album by Duster
- Released: March 22, 2019
- Genre: Slowcore; space rock; shoegaze; indie rock
- Length: 163:20
- Label: The Numero Group

Duster chronology
Contemporary Movement (2000)	Capsule Losing Contact (2019)	Duster (2019)

Singles from Capsule Losing Contact
- 1. "Capsule Losing Contact" Released: 9 September 2018; 2. "What You're Doing To Me" Released: 15 January 2019

Capsule Losing Contact is a compilation box set by American slowcore band Duster. It was released by The Numero Group as part of the 200 Line series on March 22, 2019, and compiles four releases: Stratosphere, Contemporary Movement, Transmission, Flux and 1975, as well as numerous singles, demos, and unreleased material. The album is named after the song of the same name on the third disc.

Capsule Losing Contact's total print run was 3,000 copies, though it was initially 2,000. The number of copies printed increased due to high demand from Numero customers. Adam Luksetich, the Numero employee who oversaw the Duster set, told The Ringer that "the idea of a Duster box had been discussed in the office for several years, and that it took some time to bring the members of the group around on the idea."

== Release and packaging ==
Capsule Losing Contact was released as a 3-CD box set as well as a 4-LP box set on "Moon dust" vinyl and standard black. The "Moon dust" copies were limited to a print run of 500. An accompanying lyric book contains all of the lyrics from the songs included in Capsule Losing Contact. The LPs themselves are stored in individual tip-on jackets, and are then placed in a hard outer shell box which contains a booklet containing full-color photographs and drawings. The album cover is a photo of Montes Apenninus, a mountain range on the Moon.

== Reception ==
Pitchfork named Capsule Losing Contact "best reissue" of the week of March 22, 2019 with reviewer Quinn Moreland giving the release a 8.5. Tim Sendra of AllMusic wrote, "Capsule Losing Contact sounds great, looks amazing, and totally justifies the prices people are asking for the original records". Treble included Capsule Losing Contact on their list of essential Numero Group releases, with Jeff Terich saying that "in hearing this ambitious, often scruffily recorded material together reinforces the mystique of the band—their blend of big space-rock sounds with lo-fi lullabies and pristine guitar chime with dense walls of fuzz capturing a cosmic journey inside a basement studio".

== Track listing ==
On CD releases, Transmission, Flux and 1975 are compiled together.

Disc 1: Stratosphere

No.	Title	Length
1.	"Moon Age"	1:06
2.	"Heading for the Door"	3:08
3.	"Gold Dust"	2:06
4.	"Topical Solution"	5:01
5.	"Docking the Pod"	1:51
6.	"The Landing"	2:43
7.	"Echo, Bravo"	4:32
8.	"Constellations"	3:43
9.	"The Queen of Hearts"	4:20
10.	"Two Way Radio"	0:19
11.	"Inside Out"	2:21
12.	"Stratosphere"	6:58
13.	"Reed to Hillsborough"	4:01
14.	"Shadows of Planes"	1:50
15.	"Earth Moon Transit"	4:24
16.	"The Twins / Romantica"	3:43
17.	"Sideria"	1:48

Disc 2: Contemporary Movement

No.	Title	Length
1.	"Get the Dutch"	4:47
2.	"Operations"	3:30
3.	"Diamond"	3:26
4.	"Me and the Birds"	1:35
5.	"Travelogue"	4:36
6.	"The Phantom Facing Me"	2:56
7.	"Cooking"	4:35
8.	"Unrecovery"	3:34
9.	"The Breakup Suite"	3:21
10.	"Everything You See (Is Your Own)"	2:40
11.	"Now It's Coming Back"	2:43
12.	"Auto-Mobile"	2:07

Disc 3: Transmission, Flux

No.	Title	Length
1.	"Orbitron"	2:19
2.	"Fuzz and Timbre"	0:37
3.	"My Friends are Cosmonauts"	1:44
4.	"Closer to the Speed of Sound"	2:59
5.	"Stars Will Fall"	1:58
6.	"Four Hours"	3:42
7.	"Light Years"	3:39
8.	"Capsule Losing Contact"	6:17
9.	"East Reed"	1:03
10.	"And Things Are Mostly Ghosts (Version Over Dose Mix)"	3:57

Disc 4: 1975

No.	Title	Length
1.	"Irato"	4:17
2.	"Memphis Sophisticate"	4:09
3.	"The Motion Picture"	2:43
4.	"And Things (Are Mostly Ghosts)"	3:19
5.	"August Relativity"	3:09
6.	"Want No Light to Shine"	6:01
7.	"Haunt My Sleep"	2:43
8.	"Peyote"	1:37
9.	"Something that I Need"	1:47
10.	"What You're Doing to Me"	6:08
11.	"Faint"	3:16
12.	"The Hours"	2:14
Total length:		2:43:20
