= Dickless =

American grunge band

- Left to Right: Jana McCall, Kerry Green, Kelly Canary, Lisa Smith. Photo by Charles Peterson, 1991

Background information
- Origin: Seattle, Washington, United States
- Genres: Grunge, punk rock
- Years active: 1989-1998
- Label: Sub Pop Records
- Past members: Kelly Canary (vocals); Megan Jasper (vocals); Jennie Trower (bass); Jana McCall (bass); Kerry Green (guitar); Lisa Smith (drums); Lisa Buckner (drums)

Dickless was a Seattle-based grunge band signed to Sub Pop records in 1990. Dickless is notable for their unique raspy/screamy vocal style. During their first few years, their loud and abrasive sound was new and unusual for an all-female music group. Simultaneously, their short discography included song titles and a song cover, "I'm a Man" by Bo Diddley, that were blatantly ironic given their abrasive sound and female members. The band name itself is meant to be satire. The group's period of activity coincided with the emerging "riot grrrl" music culture.

== History ==
The original lineup consisted of Lisa Buckner (drums), Kelly Canary (vocals), Jana McCall (bass), Kerry Green (guitar). Lisa Buckner was soon replaced by Lisa Smith from Atomic 61 on drums. After a few years, Kelly Canary quit to form the Teen Angels. Lisa Smith would also join Teen Angels later. Sub Pop employee Megan Jasper became the new vocalist after Kelly Canary's last show. Jennie Trower eventually replaced Jana McCall on bass.

== Discography ==
The group had a relatively short discography during their sporadic nine-year existence. Their entire discography was seven short songs (most songs were between 1:00 to 2:00 minutes) spread across seven different releases (not counting the planned, but never released Anthology album).

Their release as Thee Dickless All Stars included Mark Arm of Mudhoney on vocals and Duane Bodenheimer of Derelicts on guitar. Their song Lumber Jack again included Mark Arm of Mudhoney on vocals.

=== Singles ===
- Saddle Tramp / I'm A Man 7" record from Sub Pop Records, SP59 (1990)
- Saddle Tramp / I'm A Man / Miniskirt Mob Maxi record from Tupelo Recording Company (1990)
- Sex God Tad 7" record (listed as artist Thee Dickless All-Stars) from Sub Pop Records, SP100 (1991)
- Lumber Jack / C-Word 7" record from Sub Pop Records, SP441 (1998)

=== Compilation appearances ===
- Saddle Tramp (live version) from Sub Pop Records Compilation The Grunge Years, SP112 (1991)
- Sweet Teeth from C/Z Records Compilation album Teriyaki Asthma, Vols. I-V (1991)
- C-Word from Up Records Compilation album Up Next, UP60 (1998)

=== Compilation albums ===
- Dickless Anthology from Sub Pop Records (1998) (not released)
