= Contemporary Movement =

Studio album by Duster
- Released: August 22, 2000
- Genre: Space rock; indie rock; slowcore
- Length: 39:49
- Label: Up Records

Duster chronology
Stratosphere (1998)	Contemporary Movement (2000)	Capsule Losing Contact (2019)

Professional ratings
Review scores
Source	Rating
AllMusic	4/5 stars
Pitchfork	8.4/10

Contemporary Movement is the second studio album by American slowcore band Duster. The album was released in 2000 on Up Records. It was their last album before the band's hiatus later that year.

Unlike Duster's previous album Stratosphere, all three band members were involved in the making of Contemporary Movement.

The album was issued on both vinyl and CD. The album's cover art depicts the parking structures at the Seattle–Tacoma International Airport. Contemporary Movement was later reissued as part of the Capsule Losing Contact box set.

== Critical reception ==
Portland Mercury wrote that "Duster’s unhurried compositions never fully clarify or cohere; voices hide behind dense washes of guitar, verses reach toward choruses that aren’t there, songs end abruptly before they can be caught, tagged, and filed away." Pitchfork gave the album an 8.4/10, writing "there's nothing here nearly as abstract as the buzzing drone construction that was Stratosphere's title track, but Duster still has a way with the slow tempo and the beautifully distorted guitar noise."

== Track listing ==
All tracks are written by Clay Parton, Dove Amber, Jason Albertini.

No.	Title	Length
1.	"Get the Dutch"	4:47
2.	"Operations"	3:30
3.	"Diamond"	3:26
4.	"Me and the Birds"	1:35
5.	"Travelogue"	4:36
6.	"The Phantom Facing Me"	2:56
7.	"Cooking"	4:35
8.	"Unrecovery"	3:34
9.	"The Breakup Suite"	3:21
10.	"Everything You See (Is Your Own)"	2:40
11.	"Now It’s Coming Back"	2:43
12.	"Auto-Mobile"	2:07
Total length:		39:49
