= Together (Duster album) =

Studio album by Duster
- Released: April 1, 2022
- Length: 47:42
- Label: The Numero Group

Duster chronology
Duster (2019)	Together (2022)	Remote Echoes (2023)

Together is the fourth studio album by American indie rock band Duster. The album was surprise-released on April 1, 2022 by The Numero Group. It is the band's first release after the departure of drummer Jason Albertini. The album is described as an "exploration of comfortable, interplanetary goth". The album was also the first non-archival release for the Numero Group.

== Critical reception ==
Professional ratings
Aggregate scores
Source	Rating
Metacritic	86/100
Review scores
Source	Rating
AllMusic	4.5/5 stars
Pitchfork	7.7/10

Together received positive reviews from music critics. On Metacritic, it has a score of 86 out of 100, indicating "universal acclaim", based on 4 reviews. Allmusic critic Tim Sendra praised the album as Duster's "most immediate and song-oriented record".

== Track listing ==
All tracks are written by Clay Parton and Dove Amber.

No.	Title	Length
1.	"New Directions"	3:17
2.	"Retrograde"	4:22
3.	"N"	3:01
4.	"Time Glitch"	3:51
5.	"Teeth"	4:30
6.	"Escalator"	3:59
7.	"Familiar Fields"	5:12
8.	"Moonroam"	1:27
9.	"Sleepyhead"	2:57
10.	"Making Room"	3:46
11.	"Drifter"	3:55
12.	"Feel No Joy"	3:57
13.	"Sad Boys"	3:28
Total length:		47:42
