= Up Records =

American independent record label

- Founded: 1994
- Founder: Chris Takino; Rich Jensen
- Defunct: 2008
- Status: Defunct
- Genre: Indie rock
- Country of origin: U.S.
- Location: Seattle, Washington

Up Records was a Seattle-based independent record label founded in 1994 by Chris Takino and Rich Jensen. Some of the label's best-known artists were Duster, 764-HERO, Built to Spill, Modest Mouse, Quasi and Tad.

Chris Takino died of leukemia in 2000. The label was owned and managed by his partner Pete Ritchey until it was licensed to Sub Pop about 2018. The last update to the Up Records website was in 2007.

== Discography ==
- UP000 Various Artists - Up Records Sampler 7"
- UP001 Violent Green - You Make Me Wish I Had a Gun 7"
- UP002 Juned - So White 7"
- UP003 Mike Johnson - 100% Off 7"
- UP004 Butterfly Train - Blame Weight 7"
- UP005 Butterfly Train - Building Distrust From Trust CD/LP
- UP006 Built To Spill - There's Nothing Wrong With Love CD/LP/CS
- UP007 Juned - Juned CD/LP
- UP008 Mike Johnson - Where Am I? CD/LP/CS
- UP009 Oswald Five-O - Blue TV 7"
- UP010 Violent Green - Eros CD/LP/CS
- UP011 Land of the Loops - Multi Family Garage Sale 7"
- UP012 Hush Harbor - Hush Harbor CD/10"
- UP013 Caustic Resin - Yeah 7"
- UP014 Various Artists - Stacked Up! CD
- UP015 Built To Spill - Distopian Dream Girl 7"
- UP016 Juned - Possum 7"
- UP017 Caustic Resin - Fly Me To The Moon CD/2xLP
- UP018 Built To Spill / Caustic Resin CD/10"
- UP019 Incredible Force of Junior - Blue Cheer 7"
- UP020 Land of the Loops - Bundle of Joy CD/2xLP
- UP021 Butterfly Train - Distorted Retarded Peculiar CD
- UP022 Rick Sabo - Three Four 7"
- UP023 Mocket - Pearl Drop 7"
- UP024 Juned - Every Night For You CD/LP
- UP025 The Pastels - Mobile Safari CD/LP
- UP026 Incredible Force of Junior - Let the World Fall Apart CD/LP
- UP027 Modest Mouse - This Is a Long Drive for Someone with Nothing to Think About CD/2xLP
- UP028 764-Hero - High School Poetry 7"
- UP029 Stinky Fire Engine - Giant 7"
- UP031 Land of the Loops - Refried Treats CD/12"
- UP032 Satisfact - The Unwanted Sounds of Satisfact CD/LP
- UP033 Built To Spill - Perfect From Now On 2xLP
- UP034 Violent Green - From Cycles of Heat CD
- UP035 Modest Mouse - Interstate 8 CD
- UP036 764-Hero - Salt Sinks, Sugar Floats CD/LP
- UP037 Hot White Noon - Gutted End 7"
- UP038 The Pastels - Unfair Kind of Fame CD/2x7"
- UP039 Duster - Transmission, Flux 7"
- UP040 Quasi - R&B Transmogrification CD
- UP041 The Pastels - Illumination CD/LP
- UP043 Dina Martina - Christmas With Dina Martina 7"
- UP044 Modest Mouse - The Lonesome Crowded West CD/2xLP
- UP045 Various Artists - Up In Orbit! CD
- UP046 764-Hero - We're Solids CD
- UP047 Modest Mouse - Other People's Lives 7"
- UP048 Karp - Prisonshake 7"
- UP049 Jana McCall - Self Titled CD
- UP050 Duster - Stratosphere CD/LP
- UP051 Small Stars - It's Getting Late 7"
- UP052 Sick Bees - Push 7"
- UP053 The Need - w/ Joe Preston & DJ Zena 10"
- UP054 Quasi - Featuring "Birds" CD/2xLP
- UP055 Tad - Oppenheimer's Pretty Nightmare 7"
- UP056 Violent Green - Hangovers In The Ancient World CD/LP
- UP057 Mike Johnson - I Feel Alright CD/LP
- UP058 Modest Mouse/764-Hero - Whenever You See Fit CD/12"
- UP059 Dina Martina - The President's Day Song 7"
- UP060 Various Artists - Up Next CD
- UP061 764-Hero - Get Here and Stay CD/LP
- UP062 Tiffany Anders - Running From Noplace to Nowhere CD
- UP063 Brent Arnold - Sweetness/Perversion 7"
- UP064 The Microphones - Bass Drum Dream 7"
- UP065 The Pastels - Illuminati CD
- UP066 The Pastels - One Wild Moment 12"
- UP067 The Dark Fantastic - Self Titled CD
- UP069 Built To Spill - Keep it Like a Secret LP
- UP071 Octant - Shock-No-Par CD/LP
- UP072 Quasi - Field Studies CD/2xLP
- UP073 Modest Mouse - Building Nothing Out Of Something CD/LP
- UP074 Land of the Loops - Hurry Up and Wait CD
- UP075 Duster - 1975 CD/LP
- UP076 764-Hero - Garrison 7"
- UP077 The Black Heart Procession - A 3 Song Recording EP CD/12"
- UP078 Dina Martina - The Holiday Album CD
- UP079 Up Records and Slabco: US Compilation CD
- UP080 Land of the Loops - Puttering About a Small Land CD/2xLP
- UP081 Sick Bees - My Pleasure CD
- UP082 Polar Goldie Cats - Polar Night Stress CD
- UP083 Built To Spill - Live 2xLP
- UP085 The Concretes - Boy You Better Run Now CD/LP
- UP086 764-Hero - Weekends of Sound CD/LP
- UP088 Octant - Car Alarms and Crickets CD/LP
- UP089 Enemymine - The Ice In Me CD/LP
- UP090 Modest Mouse - Night On the Sun 12"
- UP091 Duster - Contemporary Movement CD/LP
- UP092 Land of the Loops vs. Buckminster Fuzeboard - Single Girl Summer Home flexi-7"
- UP093 Tiffany Anders - Funny Cry Happy Gift CD/LP
- UP094 Jana McCall - Slumber CD
- UP095 The Dark Fantastic - Goodbye Crooked Scar CD/LP
- UP096 Built To Spill - Ancient Melodies of the Future LP
- UP098 Caustic Resin - Keep On Truckin' CD
- UP099 Doug Martsch - Now You Know LP
- UP100 Mike Johnson - What Would You Do CD
- UP101 Brent Arnold & The Spheres - Last Boat CD
- UP102 Sick Bees - The Marina Album CD
- UP103 Up Records 10th Anniversary DVD
- UP104 Helvetia - The Clever North Wind CD
- UP105 Mike Johnson - Gone Out Of Your Mind CD
- UP106 Polar Goldie Cats - Feral Phantasms CD

== See also ==
- List of record labels
