= Adickdid =

American punk rock band

- Origin: Eugene, Oregon, United States
- Genres: Punk rock, riot grrrl
- Years active: 1991–1995
- Labels: Kill Rock Stars, Imp, Yoyo, G
- Past members: Kaia Wilson; Nalini Deedee Cheriel; Sara Shelton Bellum

Adickdid was an American all-female punk rock band, started in the early 1990s in Eugene, Oregon, United States, by Kaia Wilson, Nalini Cheriel, and Sara Shelton Bellum. They toured alongside other riot grrrl bands. Their first single "All American Girl" b/w "Columbus" was put out by Imp Records in 1993. One of their opening acts was Beck at the Jabberjaw in Los Angeles. They recorded the song "Hair" on the Stars Kill Rock compilation for Kill Rock Stars. They also recorded a song for Yoyo Records. Their album, Dismantle, was put out on Imp and their own record label G Records in 1993. Members went on to form The Butchies and Team Dresch. Adickdid broke up in 1995.

== Discography ==
=== Albums ===
- Dismantle (G) (1993)
- Adicktid (IMP) (1994)

=== Single ===
- "All American Girl" / "Columbo" (IMP) (1993)

=== Compilation appearances ===
- Julep-Another Yoyo Studio Compilation (Yoyo Recordings|Yoyo) (1993) - "Bugs In Nevada"
- Stars Kill Rock (Kill Rock Stars) (1993) - "Hair"
- The Sound Guy Is Deaf And Drunk: 16 Band Recorded Live At John Henry's cassette (Soda Girl) (1995) - "Ask Nicely"
- Kill Rock Stars/Stars Kill Rock/Rock Stars Kill (Kill Rock Stars) (2013) - "Hair"
