= Built to Spill discography =

- Studio albums: 9
- EPs: 5
- Live albums: 1
- Compilation albums: 1
- Singles: 23
- Music videos: 10

Built to Spill, an American rock band, have released nine studio albums, one live album, one compilation album, five extended plays (EPs), twenty-three singles, and ten music videos. Their recording material was distributed mainly by Warner Bros. Records. They have also released material under ATP Recordings, C/Z Records, Up Records, K Records, City Slang, and Ernest Jenning Record Co.

== Albums ==
=== Studio albums ===
List of studio albums, with selected chart positions
Title	Album details	Peak chart positions		
Title	Album details	US	US Heat.	NO
Ultimate Alternative Wavers	Released: 1993; Label: C/Z; Formats: CD, cassette, LP	—	—	—
There's Nothing Wrong with Love	Released: 1994; Label: Up; Formats: CD, LP	—	—	—
Perfect from Now On	Released: 1997; Label: Warner Bros.; Formats: CD, cassette, LP	—	26	—
Keep It Like a Secret	Released: 1999; Label: Warner Bros.; Formats: CD, LP	120	3	37
Ancient Melodies of the Future	Released: 2001; Label: Warner Bros.; Formats: CD, LP	94	—	24
You in Reverse	Released: 2006; Label: Warner Bros.; Formats: CD, LP, digital download	63	—	27
There Is No Enemy	Released: 2009; Label: Warner Bros./ATP; Formats: CD, LP, digital download	50	—	—
Untethered Moon	Released: 2015; Label: Warner Bros.; Formats: CD, LP, digital download, streaming	96	—	—
When the Wind Forgets Your Name	Released: 2022; Label: Sub Pop; Formats: CD, LP, cassette, digital download	—	—	—

=== Live albums ===
List of live albums, with selected details
Title	Album details	US Heat.
Live	Released: April 18, 2000; Label: Warner Bros.; Formats: CD, LP	22

=== Compilation albums ===
List of compilation albums, with selected details
Title	Album details
The Normal Years	Released: April 30, 1996; Label: K; Formats: CD

=== Cover albums ===
List of cover albums, with selected details
Title	Album details
Built to Spill Plays the Songs of Daniel Johnston	Released: 2020; Label: Ernest Jenning Record Co.; Formats: CD, LP, digital download, streaming

=== Extended plays ===
List of extended plays, with selected details
Title	Album details
Built to Spill Caustic Resin (split EP)	Released: January 28, 1995; Label: Up; Formats: CD, 10"
Carry the Zero	Released: 1999; Label: Warner Bros.; Formats: CD
Center of the Universe	Released: 1999; Label: City Slang; Formats: CD
Sabonis Tracks	Released: 2001; Label: Warner Bros.; Formats: CD
The Electronic Anthology Project	Released: 2010; Label: Self-released; Formats: CD

== Singles ==
List of singles, showing year released and album name
Title	Year	Album
"Car"	1994	There's Nothing Wrong With Love
"So and So So and So from Wherever Wherever"	1994	Non-album singles
"Joyride"	1994	Non-album singles
"Distopian Dream Girl"	1995	There's Nothing Wrong with Love
"In the Morning"	1995	There's Nothing Wrong with Love
"Untrustable"	1996	Perfect from Now On
"By the Way"	1998	Non-album single
"Center of the Universe"	1999	Keep It Like a Secret
"Carry the Zero"	1999	Keep It Like a Secret
"Strange"	2001	Ancient Melodies of the Future
"Freebird"	2002	Non-album single
"Goin' Against Your Mind"	2006	You in Reverse
"Conventional Wisdom"	2006	You in Reverse
"They Got Away"	2007	Non-album singles
"Don't Try"	2008	Non-album singles
"Hindsight"	2009	There Is No Enemy
"Water Sleepers"	2010	Non-album singles
"Ripple"	2010	Non-album singles
"Spooky Action at the Sufferbus" (with Helvetia)	2013	Non-album singles
"Living Zoo"	2015	Untethered Moon
"Never Be the Same"	2015	Untethered Moon
"Good Enough"	2015	Non-album single
"Bloody Rainbow"	2020	Built to Spill Plays the Songs of Daniel Johnston
"Gonna Lose"	2022	When the Wind Forgets Your Name

== Guest appearances ==
List of non-single guest appearances, showing year released and album name
Title	Year	Album
"Short Cut"	1994	Rotating Tongues
"Terrible/Perfect"	1994	Northwest Post-Grunge
"Allen the Cowboy"	1996	Bite Back: Live at the Crocodile Cafe
"Just a Habit"	1997	Spunk Magazine Issue 6
"Stop the Show"	1998	Yoyo a Go Go: Another Live Compilation
"The Last Long Song"	1999	Here: A Fort Hazel Magic Compilation
"This Is What I Believe"	2000	Keep Left, Vol. 1: A Benefit for David Barsamian and Alternative Radio
"Mr. Crowley"	2004	Idaho Greentracks: A Party Sampler
"Come Over"	2008	Awesome Record, Great Songs! Volume One
"Jokerman"	2014	Bob Dylan in the 80s: Volume One

== Videography ==
=== Music videos ===
List of music videos, showing year released and directors
Title	Year	Director(s)
"Car"	1994	N/A
"In the Morning"	1994	N/A
"Big Dipper"	1994	N/A
"Fling"	1994	N/A
"Conventional Wisdom"	2006	N/A
"Hindsight"	2009	Bob Odenkirk
"Living Zoo"	2015	Jordan Minkoff
"Never Be the Same"	2015	Jordan Minkoff
