= Live (Built to Spill album) =

Live album by Built to Spill
- Released: April 18, 2000
- Recorded: April 15, 1999; May 20-21, 1999; December 7-8, 1999
- Venues: Bluebird Theater, Denver; Irving Plaza, New York City; Showbox Comedy and Supper Club, Seattle
- Genre: Rock
- Length: 71:43
- Label: Warner Bros.
- Producer: Phil Ek

Built to Spill chronology
Keep It Like a Secret (1999)	Live (2000)	Ancient Melodies of the Future (2001)

Professional ratings
Review scores
Source	Rating
AllMusic	4/5 stars
The Austin Chronicle	3.5/4 stars
Dayton Daily News	A
The Encyclopedia of Popular Music	3/5 stars
NME	8/10
Pitchfork	7.6/10
Rolling Stone	3.5/5 stars
Times Colonist	4/5 stars
The Village Voice	A−

Live is an album of live recordings made by indie rock band Built to Spill on the band's Keep It Like a Secret tour in 1999. At the time the album was recorded, the band consisted of singer/guitarist Doug Martsch, guitarists Brett Netson, Jim Roth, bassist Brett Nelson, and drummer Scott Plouf. Live was released on the Warner Bros. label on April 18, 2000.

The model featured on the cover is Jeremy Atkins, a musician and an executive with Dark Horse Comics.

== Track listing ==
All tracks are written by Doug Martsch, except where noted.

No.	Title	Studio version	Length
1.	"The Plan"	Keep It Like a Secret (1999)	4:54
2.	"Randy Described Eternity"	Perfect from Now On (1997)	3:55
3.	"Stop the Show"	Perfect from Now On	4:15
4.	"Virginia Reel Around the Fountain" (Calvin Johnson, Martsch)	Halo Benders' The Rebels Not In (1998)	7:00
5.	"Cortez the Killer" (Neil Young)	Neil Young and Crazy Horse's Zuma (1975)	20:30
6.	"Car"	There's Nothing Wrong with Love (1994)	3:07
7.	"Singing Sores Make Perfect Swords" (Sam Jayne)	Love as Laughter's The Greks Bring Gifts (1996)	3:33
8.	"I Would Hurt a Fly"	Perfect from Now On	5:24
9.	"Broken Chairs" (Martsch, Uluru Black)	Keep It Like a Secret	19:05

Note

- Tracks 1-3 and 9 recorded in May 20-21, 1999 at Irving Plaza, New York City
- Tracks 4-7 recorded in December 7-8 at Showbox Comedy and Supper Club, Seattle
- Track 8 recorded in April 15, 1999 at Bluebird Theater, Denver

== Double-LP version ==
As a part of Built to Spill's contract with Warner Bros. Records, all of their Warner Bros. releases were released on vinyl LP by the band's former label, Up Records. Two studio tracks, "Forget Remember When" and "Now and Then," are included as bonus tracks on the Up double-LP version. These tracks had been previously released as part of the Carry the Zero CD single/EP.

The track listing for this version is:

Side One:

1. "The Plan" – 4:54
2. "Randy Described Eternity" – 3:55
3. "Stop the Show" – 4:15
4. "Virginia Reel Around the Fountain" – 7:00

Side Two:

1. "Cortez the Killer" – 20:30

Side Three:

1. "Car" – 3:07
2. "Singing Sores Make Perfect Swords" – 3:33
3. "I Would Hurt a Fly" – 5:24
4. "Forget Remember When" – 4:23
5. "Now and Then" – 5:24

Side Four:

1. "Broken Chairs" – 19:05

== Personnel ==
- Doug Martsch – guitar (right channel), vocals
- Jim Roth – guitar (left channel)
- Brett Nelson – bass
- Scott Plouf – drums
- Brett Netson – guitar (2, 3, 8, 9)
- Sam Coomes – keyboards (9)

Production

- Phil Ek – producer, mastering
- Steve Lettie – recording (1–3, 9)
- Frank Papitto – recording (1–3, 9)
- Stuart Hallerman – recording (4–7)
- Bob Ferbranche – recording (8)
- Frankie Fulleda – audio assist (1–3, 9)
- Greg Calbi – mastering
