= The Electronic Anthology Project =

The Electronic Anthology Project began as the idea of Built to Spill bassist Brett Nelson. Always having loved and been greatly influenced by 1980s new wave music, he wondered what a guitar-driven band like Built to Spill would sound like if made a little more new wave (circa 1982). The EP was released on March 19, 2010.

A second collection of re-imagined tracks were issued for Record Store Day on April 21, 2012. This time the release featured songs by indie rock band Dinosaur Jr. The album, called simply, "The Electronic Anthology Project of Dinosaur Jr.", featured synthesizers and programmed beats by Nelson and vocals by Dinosaur Jr.'s J Mascis. There followed a collaboration with Death Cab for Cutie, with a re-imagining of two songs.

== The Electronic Anthology Project EP track listing ==
1. I Dim Our Angst in Agony ("Goin' Against Your Mind" from You in Reverse, 2006)
2. Age I Felt ("Get a Life" from Ultimate Alternative Wavers, 1993)
3. At the Where ("The Weather" from Ancient Melodies of the Future, 2001)
4. Eels ("Else" from Keep It Like a Secret, 1999)
5. What If Your Dull ("I Would Hurt a Fly" from Perfect from Now On, 1997)
6. A Gloss Siren ("Israel's Song" from There's Nothing Wrong with Love, 1994)
7. Far Path Tall Sign ("Things Fall Apart" from There Is No Enemy, 2009)

== The Electronic Anthology Project of Dinosaur Jr. track listing ==
1. Sludgefeast (from You're Living All Over Me, 1987)
2. Pond Song (from Bug, 1988)
3. Raisans (from You're Living All Over Me, 1987)
4. In a Jar (from You're Living All Over Me, 1987)
5. The Lung (from You're Living All Over Me, 1987)
6. Kracked (from You're Living All Over Me, 1987)
7. Tarpit (from You're Living All Over Me, 1987)
8. Little Fury Things (from You're Living All Over Me, 1987)
9. Feel the Pain (from Without a Sound, 1994)

== The Electronic Anthology Project of Death Cab for Cutie track listing ==
1. Soul Meets Body (from Plans, 2005)
2. Champagne From a Paper Cup (from Something About Airplanes, 1998)
