= Carry the Zero =

Song by Built to Spill

Single by Built to Spill

from the album Keep It Like a Secret
- Released: 1999
- Genre: Indie rock
- Length: 5:44
- Label: Warner Bros.
- Producer: Phil Ek

Built to Spill singles chronology
"Center of the Universe" (1999)	"Carry the Zero" (1999)	"Strange" (2001)

"Carry the Zero" is a song recorded by the American rock band Built to Spill for their fourth studio album, Keep It Like a Secret (1999). It was released as the second single from Keep It Like a Secret in 1999 through Warner Bros. Records. An extended play of the same name was released the same year; it is their first solo EP after the 1995 split EP Built to Spill Caustic Resin.

== Background ==
"Carry the Zero" is perhaps considered the band's most popular song. In "Carry the Zero", Martsch "extends a mathematical metaphor" to depict a disaffected relationship. Brett Anderson at The Washington Post depicted the tune as a "guitar manifesto in three movements." The tune remains a celebrated standard at the band's concerts.

"Carry the Zero" has been popular for a generation of indie musicians: Frances Quinlan covered the song on their 2020 album Likewise, while Michelle Zauner of Japanese Breakfast revealed it was the first song she learned on guitar.

== Reception ==
"Carry the Zero" has received wide acclaim from contemporary music critics. David Fricke at Rolling Stone praised the song's "lyric mix of run-on, conversational syntax and curveball wordplay." Pitchfork reviewer Jason Josephes called it "downright pretty," noting that it "merges Cocteau Twins-esque guitars and melody with equal sigh and much more articulate lyrics." The publication later ranked its parent album among the best to come from the Pacific Northwest, with columnist Evan Rytlewski singling out "Zero": "Although Martsch has often written about how the insecurities of youth trail us into adulthood, he’s never done so more movingly than on 'Carry the Zero,' six minutes of tough love packaged in a hug." Reyan Ali of SF Weekly called it "a wistful, lonely, rough-around-the-edges tune."

Kevin McFarland of The A.V. Club called it the band's best-ever song: "a dreamy yet surging exploration that displays Martsch at the height of his prowess for infectious melody and arresting solos." Chris DeVille at Stereogum complimented its wistful guitar tone, considering it the point within Secret that the album truly flourishes. Nina Corcoran, writing for Consequence, admired its spindly guitar work, suggesting its "symphonic outro" justifies the group's standing as "one of the '90s best guitar rock groups." Christopher Porter at The Washington Post opined that "Martsch is a very good pop songwriter [...] "Carry the Zero" [has a] great core melody." Tom Hughes singled the song out for a piece in The Guardian, calling it "a song that can lay claim to one of the best intros and outros in indie rock. Doug Martsch's golden-toned Idaho outfit roll out all their loveliest soaring hooks, striking a perfect balance between weighty rock crunch and sweet, gleaming twinkles."

== Track listing ==
1. "Carry the Zero"
2. "Sidewalk"
3. "Forget Remember When"
4. "Now & Then"
5. "Kicked It in the Sun" (live)
6. "Big Dipper" (live)

"Forget Remember When" and "Now & Then" are studio tracks that have been released only on this EP, and as bonus tracks on the double-LP version of Live; the other two studio tracks were originally released on Keep It Like a Secret.

== Personnel ==
Musicians

- Doug Martsch – guitar, vocals, producer
- Brett Nelson – bass
- Scott Plouf – drums

Production

- Phil Ek – producer, engineer
- Steve Fallone – mastering
- Zack Reinig – engineer assistant
- Scott Norton, Juan Garcia – mixing assistant
- Jeff Smith – photography
- Tae Won Yu – design, art direction
