= Goin' Against Your Mind =

2006 single by Built to Spill

Single by Built to Spill

from the album You in Reverse
- Released: January 17, 2006
- Genre: Indie rock
- Length: 8:43
- Label: Warner Bros.
- Songwriters: Doug Martsch; Jim Roth; Brett Nelson; Scott Plouf
- Producers: Martsch; Steven Wray Lobdell

Built to Spill singles chronology
"Freebird" (2002)	"Goin' Against Your Mind" (2006)	"Conventional Wisdom" (2006)

"Goin' Against Your Mind" is a song recorded by the American rock band Built to Spill for their sixth studio album, You in Reverse (2006). It was released as the lead single from You in Reverse on January 17, 2006 through Warner Bros. Records.

== Background ==
The song originated during a jam session between the band members, at half the speed of the recorded iteration. Martsch changed the tempo with the Wipers in mind. The band first shared the song during live performances in 2005. The band debuted the studio version streaming on MySpace in January 2006. It was later made available for sale digitally on February 14.

== Reception ==
"Goin' Against Your Mind" has received wide acclaim from contemporary music critics. Pitchfork named it one of the top tracks of its year, with columnist Matthew Murphy writing, "Packed tight with overlapping riffs and melodies, this track is likely to stand as one of Built to Spill's definitive creations, and is undiminished by the fact that little else on You in Reverse is quite able to match its heights." Nina Corcoran, writing for Consequence, called it "one of a kind", writing, "In almost nine minutes, Doug Martsch, Brett Nelson, Scott Plouf, and Jim Roth gear up for a fierce tackling of childhood memories, mental strength, and retaliation, all illustrated by spacious chords and heavy downbeats." Guitar.com reviewer Owen Bailey called it a "nine-minute long, hypnotic two-chord tour de force [...] Driven along by the propulsive Krautrock-esque drums of Scott Plouf, it encapsulates the record’s free spirit and showcases the varied, intertwining styles of its players." Marc Vera from Entertainment Weekly wrote that the track "finds them in perfect form, with some sliding guitar twangs and the indie power chords I've grown to love."

The Strokes guitarist Albert Hammond Jr. praised the song, calling it an "amazing nine-minute epic."

== Personnel ==
Musicians

- Doug Martsch – vocals, guitar, keyboards, percussion, co-producer
- Jim Roth – guitar
- Brett Nelson – bass
- Scott Plouf – drums, percussion

Additional musicians

- Steven Wray Lobdell – co-producer, mixing, engineer, guitar, piano, vibraphone, and percussion
- Brett Netson – guitar
- Gavin Lurssen – mastering
- Jacob Hall – mixing, engineer
