= The Normal Years =

Compilation album by Built to Spill
- Released: April 30, 1996
- Recorded: 1994–1996
- Genre: Rock
- Length: 39:06
- Label: K Records
- Producer: Calvin Johnson, Phil Ek

Built to Spill chronology
There's Nothing Wrong with Love (1994)	The Normal Years (1996)	Perfect from Now On (1997)

Professional ratings
Review scores
Source	Rating
AllMusic	2.5/5 stars
MusicHound Rock	4/5 stars
The New Rolling Stone Album Guide	2.5/5 stars

The Normal Years is a compilation album of singles, live songs, songs on other compilations, and previously unreleased recordings by indie rock band Built to Spill.

The album consists of songs that were recorded between 1993 and 1995 by various incarnations of the band, although most feature the There's Nothing Wrong with Love lineup. Doug Martsch is the only person present on all the recordings. The Normal Years was released in 1996 on K Records.

== Track listing ==
All songs by Doug Martsch, except track 4 by Daniel Johnston and Jad Fair, some lyrics on track 5 by James Christenson
Guitar and vocals by Doug Martsch on all tracks

1. "So & So So & So from Wherever Wherever"
  - Originally appeared on a 1995 Saturnine single, recorded by Calvin Johnson.
  - Andy Capps – drums
  - Brett Nelson – bass
2. "Shortcut"
  - Originally appeared on Rotating Tongues, recorded by Todd Dunnigan in late 1992 at Audio Lab in Boise, Idaho.
  - Ralph Youtz - drums
3. "Car"
  - Originally appeared on Atlas/Face single, recorded by Calvin Johnson in late 1993
  - Andy Capps – drums
  - Brett Nelson – bass
4. "Some Things Last a Long Time"
  - Cover of a Daniel Johnston song.
  - Supposed to appear on an anti-homophobia compilation, recorded by Ned Evett in January 1994 at Audio Lab, Boise, Idaho
  - Andy Capps – drums
  - Brett Netson – bass
  - Ned Evett – guitar
5. "Girl"
  - Originally appeared on an Atlas/Face single, recorded by Calvin Johnson in late 1993
  - Andy Capps – drums
  - Brett Nelson – bass
6. "Joyride"
  - Originally appeared on a K Records single, recorded by Calvin Johnson in late 1993
7. "Some"
  - Recorded live at Chicago Filmmaker in mid-1995, recorded by Aadam Jacobs
  - Andy Capps – drums
  - James Bertram – bass
  - David Schneider – drums
8. "Sick & Wrong"
  - Originally appeared on a K Records single, recorded by Calvin Johnson in late 1993
  - Andy Capps – drums
  - Brett Nelson – bass
9. "Still Flat"
  - Originally appeared on Red Hot + Bothered featuring Caustic Resin, recorded by Phil Ek at Audio Lab, Boise, Idaho in January 1995
  - Tom Romich – bass
  - Brett Netson – guitar
  - James Dillion – drums
  - Todd Dunnigan – trombone
10. "Terrible/Perfect"
  - Originally appeared on a 1995 Saturnine single, recorded by Calvin Johnson.
  - Andy Capps – drums
  - Brett Nelson – bass

== Additional personnel ==
- John McMahon III – "Unrepresented Built to Spill member"
- Erik Payne – Album art
- "the bear" – Inspiration
- Tina Herschelman – Type & layout
- Karena Youtz – Cover photo
- Bart Kline – Roadie #1
- James Christenson – Roadie #2
