= Song Spells, No. 1: Cedarsmoke =

Studio album by Sea Wolf
- Released: July 15, 2014
- Recorded: September–December 2013
- Genre: indie folk, indie rock
- Length: 40:00
- Label: self released

Sea Wolf chronology
| Old World Romance (2012) | Song Spells, No. 1: Cedarsmoke (2014) | Through A Dark Wood (2020) |

Song Spells, No. 1: Cedarsmoke, while not an official studio album, is the 4th LP by the Los Angeles-based band Sea Wolf, led by Alex Brown Church.

Song Spells is a new Sea Wolf project made up of a series of non-studio albums written and recorded within four month periods. Church has said he will 'do the albums in between official albums', while indicating that the band would begin work on the next official studio album immediately following the release of Cedarsmoke.

Unlike the band's 3 studio LP's, Leaves in the River (2007), White Water, White Bloom (2009) and Old World Romance (2012), which all saw wide releases through Dangerbird Records, Cedarsmoke began as a 'stripped down' unofficial album and was meant to explore the sonic landscape and feel of the earliest Sea Wolf songs while also providing an outlet for Church to experiment with new ideas and working methods. Geared toward existing fans of the band, the album was not intended as the next 'official' label-backed studio album, and was funded through a highly successful Kickstarter campaign. During the 4-month process of writing and recording the album, the idea of the series came about, and while it was never intended to be released on a wide scale, soon after its completion it was announced that this first entry in the series would be 'given back to fans' by releasing it exclusively through music streaming service Spotify and as a pay-what-you-wish download on the band's website.

== Track listing ==
| No. | Title | Length |
|---|---|---|
| 1. | "Intro" | 2:20 |
| 2. | "Ram's Head" | 3:35 |
| 3. | "Bergamot Morning" | 3:29 |
| 4. | "Bavarian Porcelain" | 3:51 |
| 5. | "Cedarsmoke" | 3:34 |
| 6. | "Young Bodies" | 3:29 |
| 7. | "The Water's Wide" | 4:34 |
| 8. | "Whitewoods" | 3:41 |
| 9. | "Whatever You Say, Say Nothing" | 2:18 |
| 10. | "Visions" | 8:59 |

== Personnel ==
- Alex Brown Church - vocals, guitar, bass, keyboard, programming, percussion
- Lisa Fendelander - keyboard, backing vocals
- Joey Ficken - drums, percussion
- Scott Leahy - guitar, bass, ukulele, percussion, backing vocals
- Vanessa Freebairn-Smith - cello
- Matthew Langston - guitar, backing vocals
- Written, Produced and Mixed by Alex Brown Church
- Mastered by Emily Lazar at The Lodge NYC, assisted by Rich Morales
