= You in Reverse =

Studio album by Built to Spill
- Released: April 11, 2006
- Studio: Audible Alchemy
- Genre: Indie rock
- Length: 54:18
- Label: Warner Bros.
- Producers: Jacob Hall and Steven Wray Lobdell

Built to Spill chronology
Ancient Melodies of the Future (2001)	You in Reverse (2006)	There Is No Enemy (2009)

Singles from You in Reverse
- 1. "Goin' Against Your Mind" Released: January 17, 2006; 2. "Conventional Wisdom" Released: 2006

Professional ratings
Aggregate scores
Source	Rating
Metacritic	81/100
Review scores
Source	Rating
AllMusic	4/5 stars
Alternative Press	4/5
The A.V. Club	A−
Drowned in Sound	8/10
Entertainment Weekly	B+
The Guardian	4/5 stars
Pitchfork	6.8/10
Rolling Stone	3.5/5 stars
Slant	3.5/5 stars
Spin	B

You in Reverse is the sixth studio album released by indie rock band Built to Spill. The band added one new member for this album, making Built to Spill a quartet for the first time. It was also the first album since Ultimate Alternative Wavers not recorded or produced by Phil Ek. The lineup was Doug Martsch, Brett Nelson, Scott Plouf, and Jim Roth. The album was recorded in Portland, Oregon, at Audible Alchemy. You in Reverse was released on April 11, 2006.

== Track listing ==
All tracks are written by Doug Martsch, Bret Nelson, Scott Plouf, Jim Roth.

No.	Title	Length
1.	"Goin' Against Your Mind"	8:41
2.	"Traces"	4:43
3.	"Liar"	5:11
4.	"Saturday"	2:25
5.	"Wherever You Go"	6:10
6.	"Conventional Wisdom"	6:22
7.	"Gone"	5:41
8.	"Mess with Time"	5:43
9.	"Just a Habit"	4:27
10.	"The Wait"	5:00

== Personnel ==
Built to Spill

- Doug Martsch – vocals, guitar, keyboards, percussion; mixing
- Brett Nelson – bass
- Scott Plouf – drums, percussion
- Jim Roth – guitar

Guest musicians

- Steven Wray Lobdell – guitar, piano, vibraphone, and percussion (credited as "utility player" in the album notes, without specifying instruments or tracks)
- Brett Netson – guitars (1, 6, 7, 9)
- Sam Coomes – organ (7)

Production

- Jacob Hall – recording
- Steven Wray Lobdell – recording, mixing
- Gavin Lurseen – mastering
- Mike Scheer – art: front & back cover drawings, altered band photos
- Autumn de Wilde – photography
- Marshal Serna – layout tech and design
- Karena Youtz – black & white design
- Tamara Shores – black & white design
