= Untethered Moon =

Studio album by Built to Spill
- Released: April 18, 2015
- Genre: Indie rock
- Length: 45:49
- Label: Warner Bros.
- Producers: Sam Coomes and Doug Martsch

Built to Spill chronology
There Is No Enemy (2009)	Untethered Moon (2015)	Built to Spill Plays the Songs of Daniel Johnston (2020)

Untethered Moon is the eighth studio album by American rock band Built to Spill. The album was released on vinyl for Record Store Day on April 18, 2015, and on CD and digital format on April 21, 2015. It is the band's first album in nearly six years, since 2009's There Is No Enemy, making it the band's longest delay between studio albums up to that point.

Frontman Doug Martsch explained:

In 2012, I was a bit burned out on my ability to make new music. We actually recorded an album that year, and then we went on tour. The rhythm section guys quit the band, so we started over … it actually felt really good to start fresh.

It is the first album to feature Steve Gere (drums) and Jason Albertini (bass), replacing Scott Plouf and Brett Nelson respectively, who both left the group in 2012.

The album was announced on February 5, 2015, along with a tour schedule beginning in March. The track "Living Zoo" was released via SoundCloud on February 24, 2015. The official music video for “Living Zoo” premiered on Noisey on March 25, 2015.

== Critical reception ==
Professional ratings
Aggregate scores
Source	Rating
Metacritic	76/100
Review scores
Source	Rating
Allmusic	3.5/5 stars
aNewRisingMusic	3.5/5 stars
Rolling Stone	3.5/5 stars
Pitchfork Media	7.1/10
Exclaim!	8/10

The album has received praise, with critics and fans alike noting a revived energy within the band as well as Doug Marstch's consistently impressive guitar work. At Metacritic, which assigns a weighted average rating out of 100 to reviews from mainstream critics, Untethered Moon has received an average score of 76, based on 18 reviews, indicating "generally favorable reviews". Cam Lindsay of Exclaim! wrote that Untethered Moon is "arguably the most enjoyable Built to Spill album since 1999's pivotal Keep It Like A Secret," citing "a directness to these songs that has been missing for a few albums."

== Track listing ==
All music written by Built to Spill and all lyrics by Built to Spill with Karena Youtz

No.	Title	Length
1.	"All Our Songs"	6:15
2.	"Living Zoo"	4:22
3.	"On the Way"	4:25
4.	"Some Other Song"	4:26
5.	"Never Be the Same"	3:15
6.	"C.R.E.B."	4:21
7.	"Another Day"	3:10
8.	"Horizon to Cliff"	2:44
9.	"So"	4:28
10.	"When I'm Blind"	8:23

== Personnel ==
Built to Spill

- Doug Martsch – guitars, vocals, backing vocals
- Jason Albertini – bass
- Steve Gere – drums

Additional musicians

- Sam Coomes – shaker, piano, Mellotron, keyboards
- Caitlin Gallupe – additional backing vocals
- Duncan MacConnell – additional backing vocals
- Jordan Minkoff – additional backing vocals

Production

- Sam Coomes – producer, recorder, mixer
- Doug Martsch – producer, mixer, cover design
- Adam Lee – recorder, mixer
- Larry Crame – recorder
- Travis Harrison – mixer
- Jeremy Sherrer – mixer (honorable mention)
- Jamal Rune – masterer
- Tamara Shores – cover design
- Karena Youtz – cover design
- John Shinn – band photo
- Erin Cunningham – back cover painting
