= Conventional wisdom (disambiguation) =

Conventional wisdom may refer to:

- Conventional wisdom, certain ideas or explanations that are generally accepted as true by the public
- "Conventional Wisdom", a song by Built to Spill from their 2006 album You in Reverse
- "My Conventional Wisdom", an episode of Scrubs
