= Things Fall Apart (disambiguation) =

Things Fall Apart is a 1958 novel by Nigerian author Chinua Achebe.

Things Fall Apart may also refer to:

- Things Fall Apart (album), 1999 album by the hip hop band The Roots
- "Things Fall Apart" (The West Wing), 2005 TV episode
- "Things Fall Apart" (Ugly Betty), 2009 TV episode
- "Things Fall Apart" (Where the Heart Is), 1997 TV episode
- "Things fall apart", a short quotation from William Butler Yeats' poem "The Second Coming" (1920)
- "Things Fall Apart", a 1981 holiday single by Cristina
- "Things Fall Apart", a song by Built to Spill on the album There Is No Enemy (2009)

== See also ==
- All Things Fall Apart, 2011 film starring 50 Cent
- Things Falling Apart, a 2000 remix album by Nine Inch Nails
- Things fell apart, a BBC podcast on the culture wars by Jon Ronson
