= In Your Mind =

In Your Mind may refer to:

- In Your Mind (album), a 1977 album by Bryan Ferry
- "In Your Mind" (song), a 2005 song by Anggun
- In Your Mind, a 2015 album by Dan Woodgate
- "In Your Mind", a song by Built to Spill from Ancient Melodies of the Future
- "In Your Mind", a song by Johnny Cash from the Dead Man Walking soundtrack
