= Get to the River Before It Runs Too Low =

EP by Sea Wolf
- Released: May 8, 2007
- Recorded: 2007
- Genre: Indie pop
- Length: 18:16
- Label: Dangerbird Records
- Producer: Phil Ek, Alex Brown Church

Sea Wolf chronology
Get to the River Before; It Runs Too Low (2007)	Leaves in the River (2007)

Get to the River Before It Runs Too Low is an extended play by Sea Wolf, released on May 8, 2007.

Professional ratings
Review scores
Source	Rating
Treble Media	(Not rated) link
AllMusic	3/5 stars

== Track listing ==
All songs by Alex Brown Church.

No.	Title	Length
1.	"You're a Wolf"	3:35
2.	"The Garden You Planted"	4:01
3.	"I Made a Resolution"	3:52
4.	"Sea Monuments"	4:25
5.	"I Don't Know If I'll Be Back This Time"	2:26

== Personnel ==
- Brian Canning (electric guitar)
- Aniela Perry (cello)
- Alex Brown Church (vocals, acoustic guitar, bass guitar)
- Elliot Chenault (electric guitar)
- Jennifer Furches (violin, background vocals)
- Tanya Haden (cello)
- Aaron Burrows (keyboards)
- Scott McPherson (drums, percussion)
