= Sit on It =

Sit on it may refer to:

- Sitting
- Slang for waiting or hoarding/holding onto something until the right time to sell it or let it go
- "Sit on it", derogatory catchphrase created by Bob Brunner and said by Fonzie on the 1970s-80s television show Happy Days (meaning "piss off")
- Sit on It!, 1975 jazz album by Jimmy Smith
- "Sit on It", song by Dead or Alive on their 1984 album Sophisticated Boom Boom
- Sit on It, 1987 single by Eugene Kelly with The Pastels
- "Sit on It", song by The Halo Benders on their 1994 album God Don't Make No Junk
- "Sit on It", Garfield and Friends 1994 episode
