= Built to Spill Plays the Songs of Daniel Johnston =

2020 tribute album by Built to Spill

Studio album by Built to Spill
- Released: June 12, 2020
- Recorded: August 2018
- Studios: Fort Lawton, Seattle
- Genres: Pop rock, Indie rock
- Length: 34:25
- Label: Ernest Jenning

Built to Spill chronology
Untethered Moon (2015)	Built to Spill Plays the Songs of Daniel Johnston (2020)	When the Wind Forgets Your Name (2022)

Built to Spill Plays the Songs of Daniel Johnston is a 2020 tribute album by indie rock band Built to Spill covering the works of outsider musician Daniel Johnston. It was released on June 12, 2020, by Ernest Jenning. The album was conceived after the band completed touring with Johnston during his final two concerts in November 2017. The album received mostly positive reviews.

== Background and release ==
Built to Spill accompanied Daniel Johnston at his final two concerts in November 2017; band member Doug Martsch described the two shows as "good" and "weird". During the tour, the band recorded covers of Johnston's songs while rehearsing. Martsch later said that the band had recorded the songs "for ourselves and our friends". In the fall of 2018, the band spontaneously recorded Johnston songs during a session in their former guitarist Jim Roth's studio, and then decided to record an album of Johnston songs. Johnston died on September 11, 2019, before the album's release. The album largely covers songs that Johnston recorded in the 1990s. The album's release was pushed back from May 1 to June 12, 2020 as a result of the coronavirus pandemic, which caused shipping issues.

== Critical reception ==
Professional ratings
Aggregate scores
Source	Rating
AnyDecentMusic?	6.2/10
Metacritic	70/100
Review scores
Source	Rating
AllMusic	4/5 stars
American Songwriter	4/5 stars
Flood Magazine	8/10
No Ripcord	6/10
Pitchfork	6.7/10
PopMatters	4/10
Under the Radar	7/10
Uncut	7/10

According to the review aggregator Metacritic, Built to Spill Plays the Songs of Daniel Johnston received "generally favorable reviews" based on a weighted average score of 70 out of 100 from 9 critic scores.

Several critics praised the album for its faithfulness to Johnston's musical style and lyrical tone. Tim Sendra, writing for AllMusic, said that the album used a "low-key, almost relaxed style with slightly distorted guitars and a loose rhythm section backing Martsch's wistful vocals", while capturing "Johnston's mix of shattering pathos and irresistible melodies" and the "openhearted, almost painfully innocent nature of Johnston's songs". In Under the Radar, Scott D. Elingburg said that the album was "a combination of perfect pop and indie rock", with "traces of [Johnston's] spirit resid[ing] in every song". Likewise, Flood Magazine stated that although "the playing is more polished and proficient, less raw and ragged, than Johnston's ever was, his playful spirit is most definitely here, listening, smiling, nodding along to his own songs". Shawn Donohue in Glide described the covers as "straight ahead renditions" of Johnston's songs and said that the album "succeeds" as a "loving document to a unique songwriter". By contrast, Chris Rutledge in American Songwriter said that the album "stands as a testament to the songs and to the band reimagining them".

PopMatters rated the album 4 out of 10, describing it as "pretty lackluster" and "too plain for its own good"; No Ripcord said that the album "sounds as nondescript as the album title itself". Pitchfork rated the album 6.7 out of 10 and said that it had "nothing of the strange and messy spirit that animates Johnston's music". By contrast, Holly Hazelwood, writing for Spectrum Culture, criticized the band for failing to take ownership over the covers, stating that "you'd be hard pressed to find the band's fingerprints anywhere – so tracks like the bouncy 'Life in Vain' or 'Queenie the Dog' could have been done by any other gentle, three-piece indie rock band".

== Track listing ==
Built to Spill Plays the Songs of Daniel Johnston track listing
No.	Title	Length
1.	"Bloody Rainbow"	2:24
2.	"Tell Me Now"	3:00
3.	"Honey I Sure Miss You"	3:29
4.	"Good Morning You"	1:32
5.	"Heart, Mind and Soul"	4:28
6.	"Life in Vain"	3:25
7.	"Mountain Top"	2:05
8.	"Queenie the Dog"	3:36
9.	"Impossible Love"	2:44
10.	"Fake Records of Rock & Roll"	4:08
11.	"Fish"	3:20
Total length:		34:25

== Personnel ==
Built to Spill

- Doug Martsch – guitar, vocals
- Jason Albertini – bass
- Steve Gere – drums

Production

- Jim Roth – recording engineer
- Chris Parks – mastering
- Tae Won Yu – artwork

== See also ==
- Daniel Johnston discography
