= Perfect from Now On =

Studio album by Built to Spill
- Released: January 28, 1997
- Studios: AVAST! Recording Co. (Seattle, Washington)
- Genres: Indie rock; alternative rock
- Length: 54:13
- Label: Warner Bros.
- Producer: Phil Ek

Built to Spill chronology
The Normal Years (1996)	Perfect from Now On (1997)	Keep It Like a Secret (1999)

Singles from Perfect from Now On
- 1. "Untrustable" Released: 1996

Perfect from Now On is the third studio album released by Built to Spill, and the band's first major label (Warner Bros.) release. It was recorded at the Avast! Recording Company in Seattle, Washington by Phil Ek. Stylistically, the album was marked by its experimentation with longer song structures and philosophical lyrics about existential angst, the absurdity of chasing perfection, and the fear of mortality, while also exploring themes of personal growth, religious guilt, and the search for meaning in a chaotic, indifferent universe.

The album was recorded three times. The first time, frontman Doug Martsch attempted to play all the instruments except drums. He and Ek were dissatisfied with the results, so Martsch brought in bassist Brett Nelson and drummer Scott Plouf and recorded the album again. However, these tapes were destroyed by heat when Ek was driving from Seattle to Boise to record additional overdubs. The band rehearsed some more, then recorded the album a third time.

According to a February 1999 Spin Magazine article, the album had sold 43,000 copies up until that point.

In September 2008, the band embarked on a three-month tour to perform the album in its entirety.

== Background ==
In contrast to Built to Spill's first two albums, Perfect from Now On contains mostly long, sprawling songs. Martsch wrote the album as a result of his distaste of grunge music such as Nirvana, making the songs long and unconventional on purpose in order to prevent them from being played on the radio. "I didn't want us to have a hit. I was a little nervous that we might accidentally have a hit, and that our music would be shoved into people's faces," he said. Martsch wanted Built to Spill's popularity to spread organically through word-of-mouth rather than being promoted heavily.

Despite the length of the album's songs, Martsch rejected comparisons to progressive rock, stating that he listened to Thinking Fellers Union Local 282 instead. Perfect from Now On was Built to Spill's first album released on Warner Bros. Records, which Martsch signed with because they offered health insurance to his family, including his newborn son at the time.

The album was recorded three times. Martsch played all of the instruments except drums on the first version, but he was not satisfied with the results. Only one song from that recording, "Made-Up Dreams", made the final version. The second recording was made with bassist Brett Nelson and drummer Scott Plouf, but the tapes were damaged. The two failed albums cost $20,000 to make. Though discouraged, Martsch was convinced by Beat Happening singer Calvin Johnson to keep trying.

== Reception ==
Professional ratings
Review scores
Source	Rating
Alternative Press	5/5 stars
Chicago Tribune	3/4 stars
Entertainment Weekly	B+
NME	8/10
Pitchfork	9.2/10
Rolling Stone	3/5 stars
Spin	8/10
The Village Voice	B+

Music guide ratings
Review scores
Source	Rating
AllMusic	4.5/5 stars
MusicHound Rock	4/5 stars
The Rolling Stone Album Guide	3.5/5 stars

Perfect from Now On was released to widespread critical acclaim and is widely regarded as an indie rock masterpiece as well as Built to Spill's magnum opus. Pitchfork ranked this album at #22 on its "Top 100 Albums of the 90s" list. This album, along with 1999's Keep It Like a Secret and 1994's There's Nothing Wrong with Love, is frequently cited as one of the greatest indie rock albums of all time, and has come to influence many modern alternative, rock, and indie acts.

== Track listing ==
All tracks are written by Doug Martsch, except where noted

No.	Title	Writer(s)	Length
1.	"Randy Described Eternity"	Martsch, Karena Youtz	6:09
2.	"I Would Hurt a Fly"		6:15
3.	"Stop the Show"		6:26
4.	"Made-Up Dreams"		4:52
5.	"Velvet Waltz"		8:33
6.	"Out of Site"	Martsch, Youtz	5:33
7.	"Kicked It in the Sun"	Martsch, Youtz	7:32
8.	"Untrustable / Part 2 (About Someone Else)"		8:53
Total length:			54:18

Vinyl edition bonus track
No.	Title	Length
9.	"Easy Way"	6:45
Total length:		61:03

== Personnel ==
=== Musicians ===
- Doug Martsch - vocals, guitar, Moogs, bass on "Made-Up Dreams"
- Brett Nelson - bass, Moog on "Untrustable / Part 2 (About Someone Else)", Optigan on "Kicked It in the Sun"
- Scott Plouf - drums, percussion, piano on "Randy Described Eternity", Moog on "Stop the Show" and "Kicked It in the Sun"

=== Additional musicians ===
- Brett Netson - guitar on "Randy Described Eternity," "I Would Hurt a Fly," "Stop the Show," "Velvet Waltz," and "Out of Site"
- John McMahon - cello on "I Would Hurt a Fly," "Stop the Show," "Velvet Waltz," "Out of Site," and "Untrustable/Pt. 2 (About Someone Else)"
- Robert Roth - Mellotron on "Made-Up Dreams," "Velvet Waltz," and "Untrustable/Pt. 2 (About Someone Else)"
- Peter Lansdowne - drums on "Made-Up Dreams" and "Easy Way"
- Karena Youtz - "title and some words" on "Velvet Waltz", "Out Of Site", and "Kicked It in the Sun"; backing vocals on "Made-Up Dreams" and "Kicked It in the Sun"

=== Production ===
- Phil Ek - producer, recording, engineer
- Howie Weinberg - mastering
- Kip Beelman, Sam Hofstedt - engineer assistant
- Chris Takino - mixing assistant
- Tae Won Yu - design, art direction

== Sampling ==
Rapper Cage's song "Ballad of Worms" sampled "I Would Hurt a Fly". The song appeared on Eastern Conference All-Stars, Vol. 3 and Purple Rain Mix CD Vol. 1.
