= The Rebels Not In =

Studio album by The Halo Benders
- Released: February 3, 1998
- Recorded: Dub Narcotic
- Genre: Indie rock
- Length: 48:24
- Label: K Records
- Producer: Phil Ek

The Halo Benders chronology
| Don't Tell Me Now (1996) | The Rebels Not In (1998) |

Professional ratings
Review scores
| Source | Rating |
|---|---|
| AllMusic | 4/5 stars |
| Pitchfork Media | 8.8/10 |

The Rebels Not In (1998) is the third and final album recorded by the American indie rock group The Halo Benders.

The album was released on K Records on February 3, 1998, on vinyl LP and compact disc. It was the third full-length release from the Halo Benders, a side project of Calvin Johnson (of Beat Happening) and Doug Martsch (of Built to Spill). Its catalogue number is KLP81. It has a generally more polished sound than the Halo Benders' previous efforts.

The unique intro drum beat on "Bury Me" is a nod to The Wedding Present song "Yeah Yeah Yeah Yeah Yeah," from their 1994 album Watusi. This is further evidenced by Martsch's chorus of "Yeah Yeah Yeah Yeah."

== Critical reception ==
Magnet wrote that the album "merged the playful spirit of early K with higher-end production." Pitchfork Media ranked "Virginia Reel Around the Fountain" at #188 on its "Top 200 Tracks of the 1990s" list. CMJ New Music Monthly considered "Turn It My Way" to be the highlight of the album.

== Track listing ==
1. "Virginia Reel Around the Fountain" – 6:18
2. "Your Asterisk" – 2:50
3. "Lonesome Sundown" – 4:43
4. "Devil City Destiny" – 4:56
5. "Bury Me" – 3:25
6. "Surfers Haze" – 3:11
7. "Do That Thing" – 3:47
8. "Love Travels Faster" – 4:11
9. "Turn It My Way" – 4:22
10. "Rebels Got a Hole in It" – 6:02
11. "Foggy Bottom" – 4:39
