= God Don't Make No Junk =

Studio album by The Halo Benders
- Released: 24 June 1994
- Recorded: Dub Narcotic
- Genre: Indie rock, alternative rock
- Length: 33:18
- Label: K Records
- Producer: Steve Fisk

The Halo Benders chronology
God Don't Make No Junk (1994)	Don't Tell Me Now (1996)

Professional ratings
Review scores
Source	Rating
AllMusic	3/5 stars

God Don't Make No Junk is the first studio album by the American indie rock band The Halo Benders. It was released in 1994 on K Records. The album was the first full-length release by the Halo Benders, a side project of Calvin Johnson (of Beat Happening) and Doug Martsch (of Built to Spill). Its catalogue number is KLP29.

The album title references the black pride slogan of the 1970s.

== Critical reception ==
Trouser Press called the album "a sampler of extraordinary diversity" and "a stack of strange gems." Gimme Indie Rock: 500 Essential American Underground Rock Albums 1981-1996 praised "Canned Oxygen," calling it "a musical high point for both principal personalities." Spin listed the album as one of "Rock's 25 Greatest Team-ups."

== Track listing ==
1. "Snowfall" – 3:50
2. "Don't Touch My Bikini" – 3:38
3. "Will Work for Food" – 4:44
4. "Freedom Ride" – 2:25
5. "Sit on It" – 1:17
6. "Canned Oxygen" – 3:23
7. "Scarin" – 1:52
8. "On a Tip" – 3:05
9. "I Can't Believe It's True" – 4:54
10. "Big Rock Candy Mountain" – 4:10
