= Ned Evett =

American Fretless Guitarist, songwriter (born 1967)

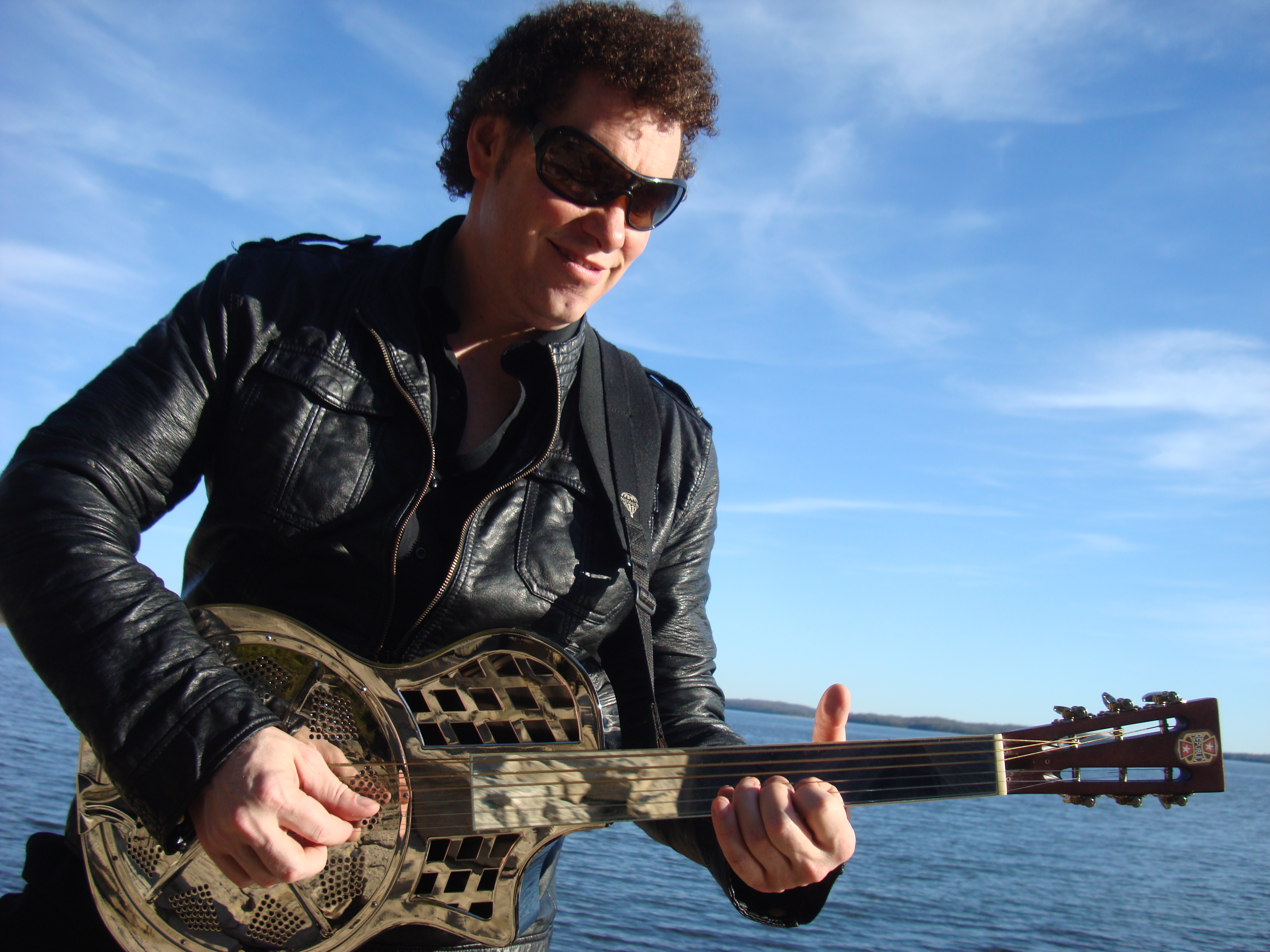
- Ned Evett with his trademark fretless mirrored-glass and steel resonator, the "Globro"

Background information
- Born: May 9, 1967 (age 59); Nashville, Tennessee, United States
- Genres: Rock, blues, Americana, Delta blues, instrumental rock
- Occupations: Musician, songwriter
- Instruments: Guitar, vocals, fretless guitar, mandolin, piano
- Website: nedevett.com

Ned Evett (born May 9, 1967) is an American guitarist, singer and songwriter, best known for inventing and playing the fretless glass-necked guitar. He lives in Los Angeles, California.

== Biography ==
Edward Duncan Evett was born in Nashville, Tennessee, United States. A son of a university English professor and an opera singer mother, Evett excelled at music; first playing the ukulele at the age of 11, progressing to the classical guitar and giving his first professional performance at the age of sixteen. He then won a classical guitar scholarship, but dropped out before graduating to play in rock bands around the US.

Evett began playing fretless guitar in 1990 on a modified stratocaster that he built from various parts, including a basswood body from Luthier John Bolin. He first appeared in print in Fingerstyle magazine's 'Bizarre Guitars' profile, who stated "Ned Evett will make you reconsider the plucked-string instrument".

Evett developed the use of glass fingerboards for fretless guitar in 1996. In 1996, Evett played the fretless glass-necked guitar with Warner Brothers Recording artists Built to Spill, on their album, The Normal Years.

In 2003, Evett won the North American Rock Guitar Competition and, in 2004, PBS Television broadcast a documentary about the competition titled Driven To Play. The competition launched a series of high-profile opening concert performances for Evett with notable musicians, including Joe Satriani, the Allman Brothers, John Fogerty, George Thorogood, Eric Johnson, Kansas, and Leon Russell.

In December 2003, USA Today described Evett as "The perfectly sane and vastly entertaining master of the fretless glass-neck guitar".

In 2007, Guitar Player described Evett as "The world's first fretless guitar rockstar".

In 2012, Evett released Treehouse, his sixth solo record, produced in Nashville, Tennessee by musician Adrian Belew.

An animated filmmaker, Evett and Joe Satriani co-created the original animated series Crystal Planet, currently in development. It was published as a four part graphic novel by Incendium Comics in 2021

== Discography ==
- Built to Spill : The Normal Years (1993)
- An Introduction to Fretless Guitar (2001)
- Fretless Guitar Masters (2001)
- Circus Liquor (2003)
- Evett/Vigroux (2004)
- iStole (2004)
- Village of the Unfretted (2005)
- Middle of the Middle (2007)
- Afraid For You (2010)
- Treehouse (2011)
- Glass Guitar (2015)
- All American Radio (2020)

== Television appearances ==
- Driven to Play PBS (2004)
