= Don't Tell Me Now =

Studio album by The Halo Benders
- Released: January 16, 1996
- Recorded: Dub Narcotic
- Genre: Indie rock
- Label: K Records
- Producer: Phil Ek

The Halo Benders chronology
God Don't Make No Junk (1994)	Don't Tell Me Now (1996)	The Rebels Not In (1998)

Professional ratings
Review scores
Source	Rating
AllMusic	3/5 stars
Spin	6/10

Don't Tell Me Now (1996) is the second studio album by the American indie rock group The Halo Benders.

The album was released on K Records in 1996. It was recorded at Dub Narcotic, in Olympia, Washington. The catalog number is KLP 46.

== Critical reception ==
Trouser Press called the album "wonderful," praising the greatness of the band's "why-not imagination." CMJ New Music Monthly called it "spirited throughout" and "a generally worthy follow-up."

== Track listing ==
All tracks by The Halo Benders

1. "Phantom Power" – 1:51
2. "Halo Bender" – 4:30
3. "Mercury Blues" – 3:10
4. "Bomb Shelter Pt.1" – 1:50
5. "Bomb Shelter Pt.2" – 4:15
6. "Volume Mode" – 3:18
7. "Inbred Heart" – 2:13
8. "Planned Obsolescence" – 4:40
9. "Magic Carpet Rider" – 2:08
10. "Blank Equation" – 3:17
11. "Crankenstein" – 4:14

== Personnel ==
- Calvin Johnson – vocals, guitar
- Doug Martsch - guitar, vocals, bass
- Phil Ek – organ on "Planned Obsolescence," additional drums on "Bombshelter Part Two," supervising engineer
- Wayne Flower - bass, drums
- Alex Knold - cello on "Blank Equation"
- Jen Smith – vocals on "Bombshelter"
- Beth Rangert - vocals on "Bombshelter"
- Ralph Youtz - drums, guitar
- Steve Fisk - keyboards
