= Moneyball =

Moneyball or money ball may refer to:

- Moneyball: The Art of Winning an Unfair Game, 2003 book by Michael Lewis
  - Moneyball (film), 2011, adaptation of the book
- Moneyball (album), 2025, by Dutch Interior
- Sabermetrics, a statistical approach sometimes referred to as "moneyball"
- Moneyball (game show), early 2020s British game show
- A multicolored ball in the NBA's Three-Point Contest worth extra points
