= Afternoons (band) =

American indie rock band

- Origin: Los Angeles, California, United States
- Genre: Indie rock
- Years active: 2006–present
- Members: Aaron Burrows; Brent Turner; Brian Canning; Claire McKeown; Sam Johnson; Steven Scott; Tom Biller
- Website: Official website

Afternoons is an American indie rock band, based out of Los Angeles, California, United States. Started by Irving band members Steven Scott and Brian Canning as an afternoon recording project, Afternoons was informally created in 2006. Grammy Award winner Tom Biller joined as both recording engineer and record producer, also performing live with the group playing guitar, bass, keyboards and drums. Classically trained opera singer Claire McKeown from the band Dirt Bird, sung on the recordings and along with Biller, Scott, Canning and former Irving drummer Brent Turner, has performed live with the band since their first show. As the band developed and the focus of Irving members shifted to Afternoons, keyboardist Aaron Burrows of both Irving and Sea Wolf joined along with multi-instrumentalist Sam Johnson. Johnson had joined Irving on their European tour in 2007 after the departure of Sea Wolf founder Alex Church.

Afternoons gained social relevance when in early 2008 contemporary artist, graphic designer and illustrator, Shepard Fairey, took interest in the band, creating a poster campaign featuring the title of the band's first single "Say Yes." The posters appeared around Los Angeles shortly after Fairey's "Obama Progress" Campaign. Fairey also gave an early copy of the band's unofficial demo to radio DJ Steve Jones of Los Angeles-based radio station Indie 103.1. Jones, the founding guitar player of the Sex Pistols started playing "Say Yes" on his afternoon radio program, "Jonesy's Jukebox".

Their debut album, Say Yes, was released on October 21, 2014.
