= Good Morning Beautiful (Irving album) =

Studio album by Irving
- Released: 2002
- Genre: Indie rock
- Label: Eenie Meenie Records
- Producer: Aaron Espinoza; Andy Paley; Irving

Irving chronology
Good Morning Beautiful (2002)	I Hope You're Feeling Better Now (2003)

Professional ratings
Review scores
Source	Rating
Allmusic	link

Good Morning Beautiful is the debut album by Los Angeles indie band Irving.

== Track listing ==
1. "Crumbling Mountain Tops"
2. "Eyes Adjust to Light"
3. "L-O-V-E"
4. "Sleepy Inside"
5. "Did I Ever Tell You I'm in Love with Your Girlfriend"
6. "Holiday"
7. "March Was Fair at Best"
8. "Turn of the Century"
9. "Heading North"
10. "A Very Frivolous Distribution of Sundries"
11. "Faster Than Steam"
