= I Hope You're Feeling Better Now =

EP by Irving
- Released: September 23, 2003
- Genre: Indie rock
- Label: Eenie Meenie Records

Irving chronology
Good Morning Beautiful (2002)	I Hope You're Feeling Better Now (2003)	Death in the Garden, Blood on the Flowers (2006)

Professional ratings
Review scores
Source	Rating
PopMatters	(favorable) 13 October 2003

I Hope You're Feeling Better Now is an EP by Los Angeles indie band Irving.

== Track listing ==
1. "The Curious Thing About Leather"
2. "The Guns From Here"
3. "White Hot"
4. "I Can't Fall in Love"
5. "Give Me Your Heart Is All I Need"
