= Built to Spill Caustic Resin =

EP by Built to Spill and Caustic Resin
- Released: January 28, 1995
- Genre: Rock
- Length: 26:07
- Label: Up Records

Built to Spill Caustic Resin is a split EP released by indie rock bands Built to Spill and Caustic Resin. The EP was a collaboration between the bands.

The album attributes songwriting credits for the first two tracks to Built to Spill, the third to Caustic Resin and the last to Tae Won Yu from his time in the band Kicking Giant. Built to Spill's Brett Netson is listed as performing guitar and vocals on Caustic Resin's track "Shit Brown Eyes", while Caustic Resin's Todd Dunnigan is listed as playing organ on "When Not Being Stupid Is Not Enough" and Moog on "One Thing", both songs by Built to Spill.

The album was originally released with a cover featuring a photo of newly hatched fish larva and eggs, which had been found in a trash can. The cover photograph was changed on later issues, after the original photograph's owner complained.

The album is Up Records release UP018.

Professional ratings
Review scores
| Source | Rating |
|---|---|
| AllMusic | 3/5 stars |
| Entertainment Weekly | A– |
| MusicHound Rock | 2.5/5 stars |
| The New Rolling Stone Album Guide | 2/5 stars |

== Track listing ==
1. "When Not Being Stupid Is Not Enough" – 9:17
2. "One Thing" – 5:09
3. "Shit Brown Eyes" – 3:28
4. "She's Real" – 8:13

== Personnel ==
- James Dillion - drums (Caustic Resin)
- Doug Martsch - vocals and guitar (Built to Spill)
- Tom Romich - bass (Caustic Resin)
- Brett Netson - vocals and guitar (Caustic Resin/Built to Spill)

The track "Shit Brown Eyes" was engineered by Todd Dunnigan, and the rest were engineered by Phil Ek.
