= When the Wind Forgets Your Name =

2022 studio album by Built to Spill

Studio album by Built to Spill
- Released: September 9, 2022
- Recorded: 2019–2021
- Venue: Idaho & Brazil
- Length: 45:08
- Label: Sub Pop
- Producer: Doug Martsch

Built to Spill chronology
Built to Spill Plays the Songs of Daniel Johnston (2020)	When the Wind Forgets Your Name (2022)

Professional ratings
Aggregate scores
Source	Rating
AnyDecentMusic?	7.4/10
Metacritic	81/100
Review scores
Source	Rating
AllMusic	4.5/5 stars
Exclaim!	8/10
Loud and Quiet	7/10
Mojo	4/5 stars
Paste	7.7/10
Pitchfork	7.2/10
PopMatters	8/10
Record Collector	3/5 stars
Under the Radar	8/10
Uncut	7/10

When the Wind Forgets Your Name is the ninth studio album by American indie rock band Built to Spill. It was released on September 9, 2022, by Sub Pop.

== Track listing ==
All the tracks are written and produced by Doug Martsch.

When the Wind Forgets Your Name track listing
No.	Title	Length
1.	"Gonna Lose"	2:33
2.	"Fool's Gold"	4:01
3.	"Understood"	4:02
4.	"Elements"	5:48
5.	"Rocksteady"	5:06
6.	"Spiderweb"	5:23
7.	"Never Alright"	4:50
8.	"Alright"	4:59
9.	"Comes a Day"	8:26
Total length:		45:08

== Personnel ==
From the album's liner notes.

Musicians

- Doug Martsch – guitar, keys, vocals
- Lê Almeida – drums, percussion
- João Casaes – bass
- Josh Lewis – piano

Production

- Built to Spill – production
- Built to Spill, Lawrence Bishop and Josh Lewis – recording and mixing
- Mell Dettmer – mastering

Design

- Alex Graham – artwork
- João Casaes and Le Almeida – inside collage
- Built to Spill, Alex Graham and Jeff Kleinsmith – art direction
- Jeff Kleinsmith – design
