= Old World Romance =

Studio album by Sea Wolf
- Released: September 11, 2012
- Recorded: 2011–2012
- Genre: Indie folk, indie rock, alternative, rock, pop
- Length: 37:04
- Label: Dangerbird Records

Sea Wolf chronology
White Water, White Bloom (2009)	Old World Romance (2012)	Song Spells, No. 1: Cedarsmoke (2014)

Old World Romance is the third full-length album by the indie rock band Sea Wolf, released in 2012 on Dangerbird Records.

The album was rated 4 out of 5 stars by AllMusic.

== Track listing ==
No.	Title	Length
1.	"Old Friend"	3:57
2.	"In Nothing"	3:04
3.	"Priscilla"	3:53
4.	"Kasper"	3:35
5.	"Blue Stockings"	3:10
6.	"Saint Catherine St."	3:48
7.	"Changing Seasons"	3:50
8.	"Dear Fellow Traveler"	3:41
9.	"Miracle Cure"	4:14
10.	"Whirlpool"	3:52
