= The Halo Benders =

American band

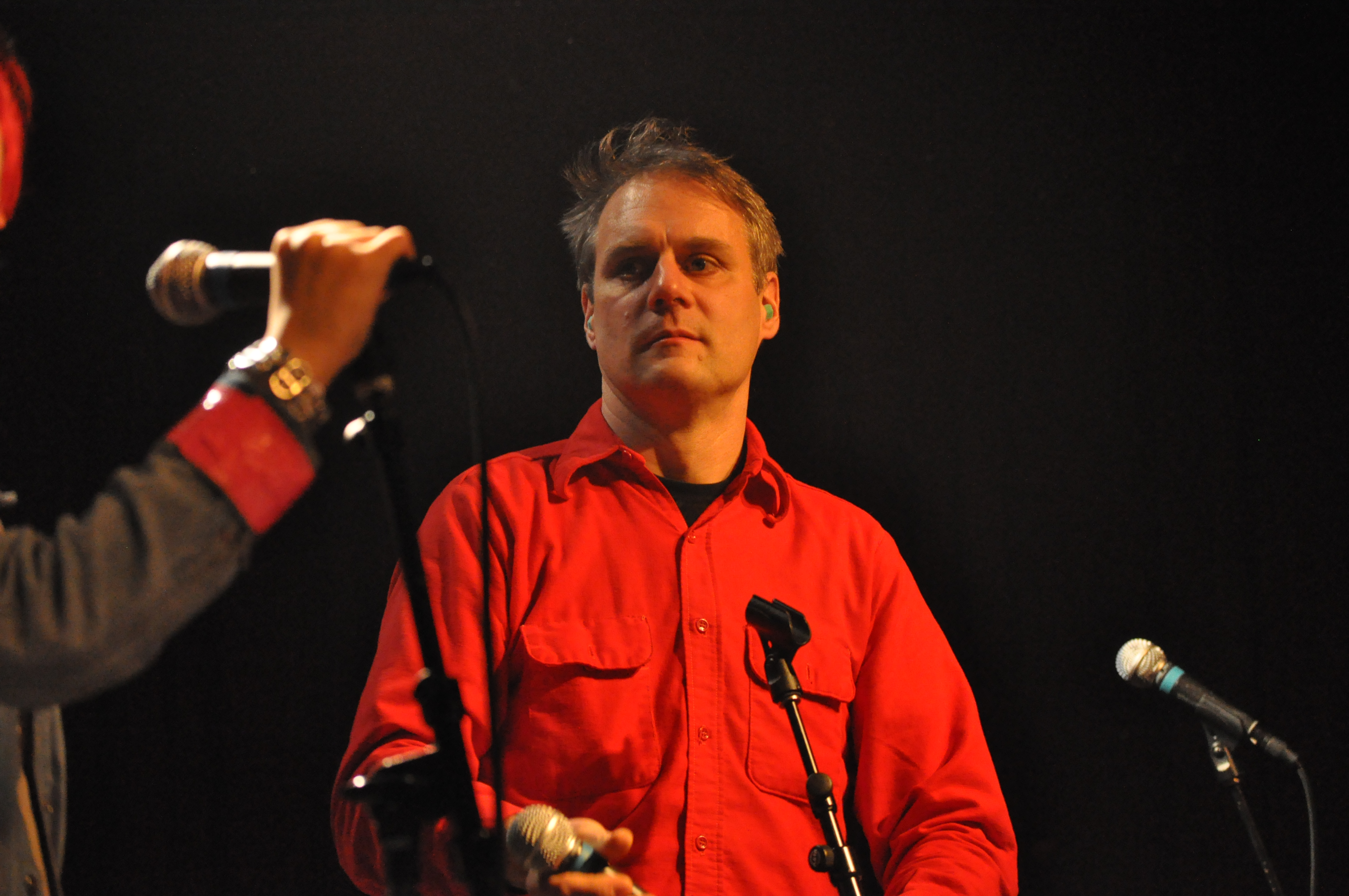
- Co-lead singer Calvin Johnson

Background information
- Origin: Boise, Idaho and Olympia, Washington, U.S.
- Genres: Indie rock; alternative rock; art punk
- Years active: 1994–2001, 2007, 2010
- Labels: K; Fire Records; Atlas Records
- Past members: Doug Martsch; Calvin Johnson; Ralf Youtz; Wayne Flower; Steve Fisk
- Website: thehalobenders.bandcamp.com

The Halo Benders was a band formed in 1994 as a side project by Calvin Johnson of Beat Happening and Doug Martsch of Built to Spill. They released their first album, God Don't Make No Junk, in 1994. They followed up in 1996 with Don't Tell Me Now and in 1998 with The Rebels Not In.

Following a hiatus through the early 2000s, the Halo Benders reformed in March 2007 for a pair of shows at the Visual Arts Collective in Boise, Idaho. The band featured Doug Martsch, Ralf Youtz, Calvin Johnson, Brett Netson, and Stephen Gere. November 2010, a reformed version with Doug, Calvin, Ralf Youtz and Wayne Flower appeared for a benefit for Friends of Mia, a child who had started an organization to help children with cancer and their families before herself dying of cancer, at the Capitol Theater in Olympia, WA.

All three of the band's albums were released on Johnson's Olympia record label, K Records.

== Music ==
The Halo Benders' music is characterized by untraditional sounds, movements, and song structures. The vocals of the baritone Johnson and the higher-pitched Martsch have been described as highly contrasting - "each seems to inhabit a completely different song." Johnson has said that the two write lyrics for songs largely independently.

== Featured on Real Stories of the Highway Patrol ==
While the band was touring Utah in the 90's, they were pulled over by police officers filming for the reality series Real Stories of the Highway Patrol.

== Members ==
- Doug Martsch - guitar, vocals, bass, keyboards, percussion
- Ralf Youtz - drums, guitar
- Calvin Johnson - vocals, guitar, samples
- Wayne Flower - bass, drums
- Steve Fisk - keyboards
- Heather Dunn - studio musician, guitars on The Rebels Not In

== Discography ==
=== Studio albums ===
- God Don't Make No Junk (1994, K Records)
- Don't Tell Me Now (1996, K Records)
- The Rebels Not In (1998, K Records)

=== Singles & EPs ===
- Canned Oxygen 7" (1994, Atlas Records)
- Don't Touch My Bikini (1995, Fire Records)
