= There Is No Enemy =

Studio album by Built to Spill
- Released: October 6, 2009
- Recorded: May 2007, Los Angeles, California
- Genre: Indie rock
- Length: 55:33
- Labels: Warner Bros. & ATP Recordings
- Producers: Dave Trumfio, Doug Martsch

Built to Spill chronology
You in Reverse (2006)	There Is No Enemy (2009)	Untethered Moon (2015)

Singles from There Is No Enemy
- 1. "Hindsight" Released: 2009

Professional ratings
Aggregate scores
Source	Rating
Metacritic	75/100
Review scores
Source	Rating
Allmusic	4/5 stars
American Songwriter	4/5 stars
The A.V. Club	B+
Consequence of Sound	A−
Drowned in Sound	8/10
Paste	7.7/10
Pitchfork	7.9/10
PopMatters	7/10
Rolling Stone	3.5/5 stars
Slant	3.5/5 stars

There Is No Enemy is the seventh studio album by indie rock band Built to Spill (their fifth on Warner Bros. Records). The album was released in the US on October 6, 2009, and is the last to feature long-time drummer Scott Plouf and bassist Brett Nelson, who left the group in 2012. It features guest musicians Sam Coomes, cellist John McMahon, Scott Schmaljohn (of Treepeople), Paul Leary, and additional keyboards by Roger Manning.

On September 30, 2009, the band streamed the full album on their official MySpace profile.

On February 15, 2010, ATP Recordings released the album in the UK and Europe with the exclusive, previously unreleased bonus track "Water Sleepers".

== Track listing ==
All tracks are written by Doug Martsch, Brett Nelson, Brett Netson, Scott Plouf, and Jim Roth, except as noted.

No.	Title	Writer(s)	Length
1.	"Aisle 13"	Martsch, Nelson, Netson, Plouf, Roth, Karena Youtz	3:17
2.	"Hindsight"	Martsch, Nelson, Netson, Plouf, Roth, Youtz	3:38
3.	"Nowhere Lullaby"	Martsch, Nelson, Plouf, Roth, Youtz	3:59
4.	"Good Ol' Boredom"		6:31
5.	"Life's a Dream"	Martsch, Nelson, Netson, Plouf, Roth, Youtz	4:53
6.	"Oh Yeah"		5:21
7.	"Pat"		2:40
8.	"Done"		6:53
9.	"Planting Seeds"		4:26
10.	"Things Fall Apart"		6:15
11.	"Tomorrow"		7:40

== Musicians ==
Built to Spill

- Doug Martsch – vocals, guitar, producer, engineer, mixer
- Brett Nelson – bass guitar
- Scott Plouf – drums
- Jim Roth – guitar
- Brett Netson – guitar

Additional musicians

- John McMahon – cello, lap steel guitar (track 3)
- Paul Leary – guitar (6)
- Scott Schmaljohn – guitar (7)
- Sam Coomes – Mellotron, organ (8)
- Danny Levin – horns (10)
- Roger Manning – organ (10, 11)

Production

- Dave Trumfio – producer, engineer, mixer
- Rob Dennler – engineer, mixer
- Mike Phillips – assistant engineer
- Alan Yoshida – mastering
- Mike Sheer – artwork
- Marshal Serna – layout
