= This Devastating Map =

2020 album by Helvetia

Studio album by Helvetia
- Released: August 7, 2020
- Genre: Experimental; lo-fi; indie; slacker rock
- Length: 31:49
- Label: Joyful Noise

Helvetia chronology
Fantastic Life (2020)	This Devastating Map (2020)	Essential Aliens (2021)

Professional ratings
Review scores
Source	Rating
Pitchfork	7.3/10

This Devastating Map is the eleventh studio album by American indie rock band Helvetia. The album was released on August 7, 2020, on Joyful Noise Recordings.

== Track listing ==
All tracks are written by Jason Albertini.

This Devastating Map track listing
No.	Title	Length
1.	"Devastating Map"	4:39
2.	"Inverted"	4:47
3.	"Reaktor"	1:45
4.	"How Does It Feel?"	1:08
5.	"Echo Location"	4:09
6.	"Car Crash"	1:31
7.	"Love Me"	1:59
8.	"We Are Reels"	2:23
9.	"Castle Rock"	1:58
10.	"Those Eyes"	4:28
11.	"3 Boys"	1:24
12.	"Long Beach"	1:34
Total length:		31:49
