= Helvetia (band) =

American indie rock band

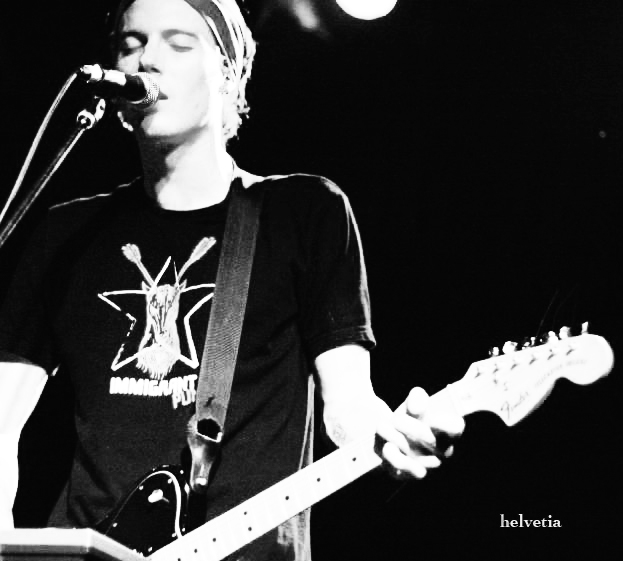
- Jason Albertini (2008)

Background information
- Origin: Seattle, Washington, U.S.
- Genres: Indie rock; lo-fi; slowcore; slacker rock
- Years active: 2005–present
- Labels: The Static Cult; Up; Joyful Noise
- Spinoff of: Duster
- Members: Jason Albertini
- Past members: C. Dove Amber; Jim Roth; Scott Plouf; Zeke Howard; Samantha Stidham
- Website: helvetiamusic.com

Helvetia is an indie rock band that formed in Seattle, Washington, in 2005. The name Helvetia is a personification of Switzerland, the childhood home of bandleader and primary songwriter Jason Albertini.

== Musical career ==
Jason Albertini started Helvetia after the dissolution of the band Duster (in which he played drums).

Helvetia's first record, The Clever North Wind, was released in 2006 on the Static Cult Label and distributed by Up Records. Their first national exposure was achieved by touring with Built to Spill. Helvetia is produced and performed by Jason Albertini and sustained by a rotating live line-up, which has included C. Dove Amber, Jim Roth, Scott Plouf, Zeke Howard, and Samantha Stidham.

Their third release, Headless Machine of the Heart was released in 2008. The record was recorded entirely on a 4-track tape machine.

In 2012, Helvetia released the album Nothing in Rambling on Joyful Noise Recordings.

Helvetia released Dromomania on Joyful Noise on October 2, 2015.

In December 2022, Helvetia released Get Lost & Other Dimensions and announcing that Albertini, now the sole member of Helvetia, was "[ending] this phase of Helvetia. I'm dealing with a health issue that's going to put me on ice for a while." Later in March 2023, along with the release of Dream Faster, Albertini announced two other albums being released a week apart from each other, and also said, "If you are worried that I'm releasing too much music just remember that it will stop eventually", which concerned fans.

On August 1, 2023, Helvetia released The Beach At The Edge Of The World, which Albertini called "the last Helvetia album". Two years later, Albertini surprise-released Welcome the Summer Heartbreak.

== Discography ==
=== Studio albums ===
- The Clever North Wind (2006, The Static Cult Label, distributed by Up Records)
- The Acrobats (2008, The Static Cult Label)
- Headless Machine of the Heart (2008, The Static Cult Label)
- Helvetia's Junk Shop (2009, The Static Cult Label)
- On the Lam (2011, The Static Cult Label)
- Nothing in Rambling (2012, Joyful Noise)
- Nothing but Ringo (2015, self-released)
- Dromomania (2015, Joyful Noise)
- A Dot Running for the Dust (2015, Joyful Noise)
- Fantastic Life (2020, self-released)
- This Devastating Map (2020, Joyful Noise)
- Essential Aliens (2021, Joyful Noise)
- Presents Sudden Hex (2021, Joyful Noise)
- Ugly Truth (2022, self-released)
- Dishes Are Never Done but Good Luck (2022, self-released)
- 28 Songs & $3 Dollar Tears (2022, self-released)
- Star Gazer Trials (2022, self-released)
- Get Lost & Other Dimensions (2022, self-released)
- You Shot Past the Moon Scapegoat (2023, self-released)
- Dream Faster (2023, self-released)
- Dream Faster II (2023, self-released)
- Dream Faster III (2023, self-released)
- Heuristic Hindsight Blues (2023, self-released)
- The Beach at the Edge of the World (2023, self-released)
- Welcome the Summer Heartbreak (2025, self-released)

=== Compilation albums ===
- Gladness (2001-2006) (2010, The Static Cult Label)
- Camp Century Sessions (2012, self-released)
- The Original Gladness Tape (2022, self-released)
- Gladness II 2001-2006 (2022, self-released)
- Gladness III (2026, self-released)

=== EPs ===
- Sun Chasers (2017, Rainbo Records)

=== Singles ===
- Tears of Rage (2010, The Static Cult Label)
- Sing Songs by the Amazing Thinking Fellers Union 282 (with Doug Martsch) (2012, Joyful Noise)
- Spooky Action at the Sufferbus (with Built to Spill) (2013, Joyful Noise)
- Crumbs Like Saucers/The Road Crew (2015, Joyful Noise)
- Christmas Time Is Here (with Pall Jenkins) (2016, Joyful Noise)
- Helvetia Xmas (2020, Joyful Noise)
- Helvetia (2023, self-released)
