= They Got Away/Re-Arrange =

EP by Built to Spill
- Released: 2007
- Genre: Rock
- Label: Warner Bros.
- Producer: Dave Trumfio

They Got Away is an EP released on July 10, 2007 by Built to Spill. "They Got Away" and "Re-Arrange" are reggae-inspired studio tracks recorded while the band toured in 2006. The second track is a cover of a song by The Gladiators. "They Got Away" was reviewed by Exclaim!, which noted, "Boosted with a heavy dosage of reverb and Brett Nelson's markedly doped out bass riff, Martsch's trademark noodling is expectedly in top form."

== Track listing ==
1. "They Got Away"
2. "Re-Arrange" (originally by The Gladiators)
