= Ancient Melodies of the Future =

2001 studio album by Built to Spill

Studio album by Built to Spill
- Released: July 10, 2001
- Length: 39:09
- Label: Warner Bros.
- Producers: Phil Ek; Doug Martsch

Built to Spill chronology
| Live (2000) | Ancient Melodies of the Future (2001) | You in Reverse (2006) |

Singles from Ancient Melodies of the Future
- 1. "Strange" Released: 2001

Professional ratings
Aggregate scores
| Source | Rating |
|---|---|
| Metacritic | 80/100 |
Review scores
| Source | Rating |
| AllMusic | 4/5 stars |
| Classic Rock | 4/5 stars |
| Drowned in Sound | 8/10 |
| Entertainment Weekly | A |
| Pitchfork | 8.6/10 |
| Rolling Stone | 3.5/4 stars |
| Spin | 8/10 |
| Tiny Mix Tapes | 3/5 marks |

Ancient Melodies of the Future is the fifth studio album by indie rock band Built to Spill. The core line-up of the band remained as it had for the previous two albums, with singer/guitarist Doug Martsch, bassist Brett Nelson, and drummer Scott Plouf. The album was recorded at Bear Creek in Woodinville, Washington, with overdubs recorded at Avast! Recording Co. in Seattle, Washington, and Martsch's studio, The Manhouse, in Boise, Idaho. Ancient Melodies of the Future was released in 2001 by Warner Bros.

== Track listing ==
All tracks are written by Doug Martsch.

| No. | Title | Length |
|---|---|---|
| 1. | "Strange" | 4:00 |
| 2. | "The Host" | 3:55 |
| 3. | "In Your Mind" | 3:46 |
| 4. | "Alarmed" | 5:07 |
| 5. | "Trimmed and Burning" | 4:19 |
| 6. | "Happiness" | 3:41 |
| 7. | "Don't Try" | 3:17 |
| 8. | "You Are" | 3:51 |
| 9. | "Fly Around My Pretty Little Miss" | 2:45 |
| 10. | "The Weather" | 4:35 |

== Personnel ==
Built to Spill

- Doug Martsch – vocals, guitars, percussion, keyboards; engineer, producer
- Brett Nelson – bass
- Scott Plouf – drums, percussion

Additional musicians

- Sam Coomes – keyboards (1, 4, 10)
- Brett Netson – guitars (2, 5, 6, 7), thumb piano (3), hi-hat (3, 6)

Production

- Phil Ek – engineer, producer
- Brad Zefferen – assistant engineer
- Greg Young – assistant engineer
- Sheldon Zaharko – mixing engineer
- Greg Calbi – mastering
- Tae Won Yu – art direction, design, photography

== Charts ==
| Chart (2001) | Peak position |
|---|---|
| US Billboard 200 | 94 |
| US Top Album Sales | 94 |
