= Now You Know (album) =

Studio album by Doug Martsch
- Released: 2002
- Recorded: Fall 1999–spring 2000
- Studio: The Manhouse, Boise, Idaho
- Genre: Rock; indie rock
- Length: 40:13
- Label: Up
- Producer: Doug Martsch (recording)

Now You Know is the debut solo album by American musician Doug Martsch of indie rock band Built to Spill. Unlike Martsch's rock-oriented work with Built to Spill, the album touches on blues and folk in addition to rock. Now You Know was released in 2002 on Up Records label.

== Track listing ==
All tracks composed by Doug Martsch; except where noted. Karena Youtz contributed lyrics.

1. "Offer"
2. "Dream"
3. "Gone"
4. "Window"
5. "Heart (Things Never Shared)"
6. "Lift"
7. "Woke Up This Morning (With My Mind on Jesus)" (Fred McDowell) uncredited
8. "Instrumental"
9. "Sleeve"
10. "Impossible"
11. "Stay"

== Personnel ==
- Doug Martsch - vocals, all other instruments
- Travis Ward - bass
- Daren Adair - drums
- John McMahon - cello

== Critical reception ==
Professional ratings
Aggregate scores
Source	Rating
Metacritic	74/100
Review scores
Source	Rating
AllMusic	4/5 stars
Austin Chronicle	3/4 stars
Blender	3/5 stars
Entertainment Weekly	B+
Magnet	4/5 stars
Mojo	3/5 stars
Pitchfork Media	7.3/10
Rolling Stone	3/5 stars
The New Rolling Stone Album Guide	4/5 stars
Stylus Magazine	6.7/10

Pitchfork Media says the album has "a Delta blues sound-- a style closer to the point in musical evolution where country/western and blues went their separate, segregated ways" and also called it "Blooze for Dummies." The reviewer also noted that most of the songs begin "with bluesy intentions, but only a handful (... "Offer"... and... "Stay") stick with that dynamic for their duration." The reviewer seemed mostly not to enjoy the departure from the Built to Spill sound, remarking that "the more familiar-sounding material is what really sticks amongst these eleven tracks."

Rolling Stone calls the album "bare-bones folk blues that recalls O Brother, Where Art Thou? more than anything by... Built to Spill." The reviewer sees the album as being influenced by "such Delta bluesmen as Fred McDowell" as well as by "Ralph Stanley and J Mascis."
