= Moneyball (album) =

Studio album by Dutch Interior
- Released: March 21, 2025
- Studio: Long Beach, California
- Genre: Americana; country rock; lo-fi
- Length: 43:48
- Label: Fat Possum
- Producer: Conner Reeves

Dutch Interior chronology
Blinded by Fame (2023)	Moneyball (2025)

Singles from Moneyball
- 1. "Fourth Street" Released: January 27, 2025; 2. "Beekeeping" Released: March 3, 2025

Moneyball is the third studio album by indie Americana band Dutch Interior. It was released on March 21, 2025, by Fat Possum Records, succeeding the band's 2021 debut, Kindergarten and 2023 album, Blinded by Fame.

== Background ==
Recorded in Long Beach, California, in the band's studio, Moneyball consists of ten songs ranging between three and five minutes each. It was produced by Conner Reeves and mixed by American record producer and audio engineer Phil Ek.

The album, focusing on hope and friendship as its theme and incorporating various instruments including guitar, banjo, piano, and synthesizer, featured vocal contributions by five of the six members of Dutch Interior, who were also involved in the songwriting. Dutch Interior cited several albums as influences for Moneyball, including Mount Eerie, Going Places, My Woman, and The Velvet Underground & Nico.

Dutch Interior released "Sandcastle Molds," the first single from Moneyball, on December 3, 2024, accompanied by a music video. Bandmember Jack Nugent said the song was inspired by an epiphany he had while driving down the 405 freeway, and described it as a meditation on “holding on to your sense of self as the world descends into madness at a nauseating pace.” The single's cover art features a scan of a photograph Nugent discovered during the demolition of a house in Lone Pine, California. The album was first announced on January 27, 2025, alongside the release of its lead single, "Fourth Street", with a music video directed and edited by the band. The band's guitarist and vocalist, Noah Kurtz, described the song as a "simple three-chord Americana rock song with a ratty, bubblegum chewing drum beat, whiny screaming lead guitar, and a cathartic a-rhythmic ending." The third single of the album, "Beekeeping", was released on March 3, 2025, alongside a music video. Shane Barton, who performed the song, referred to it as "a reflection on personal flaws."

== Reception ==
Professional ratings
Review scores
Source	Rating
AllMusic	3.5/5 stars
Clash	8/10 stars
Paste	8.1/10
Pitchfork	7.3/10

Marcy Donelson of AllMusic stated about the album that "Moneyball sounds both auspicious and like the 11th album from an unearthed Stephen Malkmus project at the same time", calling it "vaguely country-rock-minded". Pitchfork rated the album 7.3 out of ten, remarking "Ultimately, the biggest part of Moneyball's charm is its evident sincerity."

Paste assigned it a rating of 8.1 and noted that "it's the sounds of their friendships baked into the songs: natural, comfortable, and communal coexistence. That’s what makes Moneyball greater than the sum of its parts." BrooklynVegan described the album as "pretty, contemplative, remarkably cohesive and satisfying via a love of '90s indie rock, alt-country and slowcore."

Clash gave the album a rating of eight out of ten, noting "Dutch Interior's new album lives up to the hype that surrounds them in a wonderful blend of country, folk, grunge and so much more."

== Track listing ==
All tracks are written by Conner Reeves, Jack Nugent, Noah Kurtz, Davis Stewart, Hayden Barton and Shane Barton.

Moneyball track listing
No.	Title	Music	Length
1.	"Canada"	Jack Nugent, Noah Kurtz, Davis Stewart, Hayden Barton, and Shane Barton	5:04
2.	"Sandcastle Molds"	Connor Reeves, Kurtz, Stewart, and H. Barton	3:18
3.	"Wood Knot"	Kurtz, Stewart, H. Barton, S. Barton, and de Bourbon	4:21
4.	"Science Fiction"	Reeves, Nugent, H. Barton, Sean Brennan, and Lily Desmond	4:35
5.	"Sweet Time"	Reeves, H. Barton, and de Bourbon	3:42
6.	"Life (So Crazy)"	Reeves, Nugent, Kurtz, and S. Barton	5:07
7.	"Fourth Street"	Reeves, Nugent, Stewart, and H. Barton	4:12
8.	"Horse"	Nugent, Kurtz, and H. Barton	4:06
9.	"Christ on the Mast"	Reeves, Kurtz, H. Barton, S. Barton, de Bourbon, and Cole Cunningham	5:00
10.	"Beekeeping"	Reeves, Nugent, Stewart, H. Barton, Brennan, and Desmond	4:23
Total length:			43:48

== Personnel ==
Credits for Moneyball adapted from Bandcamp and Shazam.

=== Musicians ===
==== Dutch Interior ====
- Conner Reeves – vocals (tracks 1, 3, 8), electric guitar (tracks 2, 4, 5, 7, 10), bass guitar (track 6), banjo (track 9)
- Jack Nugent – vocals (tracks 2, 9), electric guitar (track 1), bass guitar (tracks 4, 7, 8), drums (track 6), acoustic guitar (track 10)
- Noah Kurtz – vocals (tracks 5, 7), electric guitar (tracks 1, 2, 3, 10), piano (tracks 6, 8, 9)
- Davis Stewart – vocals (track 6), bass guitar (tracks 1, 2, 3, 7, 10)
- Hayden Barton – drums (all tracks except 6)
- Shane Barton – vocals (tracks 4, 10), piano (tracks 1, 6), synthesizer (track 3), acoustic guitar (track 9)

==== Additional Musicians ====
- Tommy de Bourbon – electric guitar (tracks 3, 5, 9)
- Sean Brennan – cello (tracks 4, 10), strings arranging
- Lily Desmond – violin (track 4), viola (track 10)
- Cole Cunningham – acoustic guitar (track 9)

=== Technical personnel ===
- Conner Reeves – producer
- Phil Ek – mixing engineer
- Greg Obis – mastering engineer
- Saguiv Rosenstock – recording engineer (strings)
