= Irving (band) =

American indie rock band

- Origin: Los Angeles, California, USA
- Genres: Indie rock
- Labels: Eenie Meenie Records
- Members: Alex Church; Steven Scott; Brian Canning; Brent Turner; Aaron Burrows
- Website: thebandirving.com

Irving is an American indie rock band. It was founded by Alex Church, later of Sea Wolf, Brian Canning and Steven Scott in 1998, after playing together for the first time at an arts festival. Soon after, they added keyboardist Shana Levy and Brent Turner; Levy remained with the group until 2003, when Aaron Burrows joined. Rather than having a frontman, the vocal and songwriting aspects are shared by at least three people. Members Aaron Burrows, Brian Canning, Steven Scott and Brent Turner formed the band Afternoons along with, Grammy Award winning producer Tom Biller, and multi-instrumentalist Sam Johnson.

== Members ==
Current

- Steven Scott
- Alex Church
- Brian Canning
- Brent Turner, drums
- Aaron Burrows, keyboards

Former

- Shana Levy, keyboards

== Discography ==
- Irving (limited edition 7") (2001)
- Good Morning Beautiful (Eenie Meenie Records, 2002)
- I Hope You're Feeling Better Now (EP) (Eenie Meenie, 2003)
- Death in the Garden, Blood on the Flowers (Eenie Meenie, 2006)
- Spaceland Presents (live) (Graceland Records, 2007)
