= Death in the Garden, Blood on the Flowers =

Studio album by Irving
- Released: April 3, 2006
- Genre: Indie rock
- Length: 36:13
- Label: Eenie Meenie
- Producers: Phil Ek; Aaron Espinoza; Jim Fairchild; Elliot Chenault

Irving chronology
I Hope You're Feeling Better Now (2003)	Death in the Garden, Blood on the Flowers (2006)

Professional ratings
Review scores
Source	Rating
Allmusic	link
PopMatters	(7/10) 26 June 2006
CD Baby	(favorable) link

Death in the Garden, Blood on the Flowers is the second full-length release from Los Angeles indie band Irving, released in 2006.

The title track was used in a Totino's Mega Pizza Rolls commercial which began airing in early 2007.

== Track listing ==
1. "The Gentle Preservation of Children's Minds" - 4:21
2. "She's Not Shy" - 4:40
3. "Jen, Nothing Matters to Me" - 3:43
4. "Death in the Garden, Blood on the Flowers" - 3:32
5. "I'll Write the Song, You Sing for Me" - 3:50
6. "The Longest Day in the Afternoon" - 4:31
7. "Situation" - 4:09
8. "I Want to Love You in My Room" - 3:19
9. "Care, I Don't Care" - 3:41
10. "If You Say Jump, I Will Say No" - 4:19
11. "Lovely, Just Like Her" - 3:54
12. "Hard To Breathe" - 2:59
13. "The Look of Flowers That Are Looked At" - 4:36

(Bonus track on Japanese CD: 'This Life Is A Lonely Place')
