= White Water, White Bloom =

Studio album by Sea Wolf
- Released: December 2009
- Recorded: 2009
- Genre: indie folk, indie rock, alternative, rock, pop
- Length: 41:36
- Label: Dangerbird Records

Sea Wolf chronology
Leaves in the River (2007)	White Water, White Bloom (2009)	Old World Romance (2012)

White Water, White Bloom is the second full-length album by the indie rock band Sea Wolf, released in 2009 on Dangerbird Records. The first single from the album was "Wicked Blood".

== Track listing ==
All songs by Alex Brown Church.

1. "Wicked Blood" – 4:25
2. "Dew in the Grass" – 4:24
3. "Orion & Dog" – 3:49
4. "Turn the Dirt Over" – 2:59
5. "O Maria!" – 4:00
6. "White Water, White Bloom" – 4:29
7. "Spirit Horse" – 3:53
8. "The Orchard" – 3:26
9. "The Traitor" – 4:17
10. "Winter's Heir" – 4:20
11. "Stanislaus" – 4:12**
12. "Fighting Bull" – 4:21**

** Vinyl-only bonus tracks

== Charts ==
Chart (2009)	Peak position
US Billboard 200	175
