= Sea Wolf (band) =

American band

- Origin: Los Angeles, California, United States
- Genres: Indie folk, indie rock, alternative rock
- Years active: 2003–present
- Labels: Dangerbird Records, MapleMusic Recordings (Canada), Albert Records
- Members: Alex Brown Church; Lisa Fendelander; Joey Ficken; Scott Leahy; Eliot Lorango
- Past members: Theodore Liscinski; Nathan Anderson; Joyce Lee; Aaron Burrows; Aaron Robinson; Aniela Perry; April Guthrie; Byron Reynolds; Jennifer Furches; Peter Johansen; Scott McPherson; Elliot Chenault
- Website: Official website

Sea Wolf is an American band led by Alex Brown Church, an indie folk musician based in Los Angeles, California, United States.

== History ==
Church attended film school at NYU and was a founding member of a group called Irving in 1998. Many of the songs he wrote as a member of Irving didn't fit the group's style, so Church began performing as Sea Wolf with a rotating ensemble of backing musicians, playing locally in Los Angeles and recording demos in Seattle with producer Phil Ek. Sea Wolf signed to Dangerbird Records in 2007 and released the Get To The River Before It Runs Too Low EP and a full-length titled Leaves In The River. The latter hit No. 24 on the Billboard Heatseekers chart. Church named the band after Jack London's novel The Sea-Wolf, saying that he identifies with the main character, a sea captain who is a "self-taught, blue-collar intellectual guy."

On September 22, 2009, Sea Wolf's second album, White Water, White Bloom was released by Dangerbird Records. The album was produced by Mike Mogis at his studio in Omaha. Sea Wolf contributed a song entitled "Song of the Magpie" to the audio book for Augusten Burroughs' book "A Wolf at the Table". Burroughs asked Sea Wolf’s Alex Brown Church to read the book and respond with an original song. Sea Wolf also wrote a song titled "The Violet Hour" in 2009 for the second part of the Twilight movie series, New Moon.

Following the release of Old World Romance in 2012, Church and company toured extensively before returning to the Sea Wolf studio in late 2013 to write and record an experimental 'stripped down' album, which would eventually be titled Song Spells, No. 1: Cedarsmoke. The album was meant to explore the sonic landscape and feel of the earliest Sea Wolf songs while also providing an outlet for Church to experiment with new ideas and working methods. Geared toward existing fans of the band, the album was not intended as the next 'official' label-backed studio album, and was funded through a highly successful Kickstarter campaign. During the 4 month process of writing and recording the album, the idea of the series came about, and while it was never intended to be released on a wide scale, soon after its completion it was announced that this first entry in the series would be 'given back to fans' by releasing it exclusively through music streaming services and as a pay-what-you-wish download on the band's website.

The band announced in early 2017 via its website and social media that a new album is in progress.

On December 5, 2019, the band released a new single titled "Fear of Failure", and announced their new studio album titled Through A Dark Wood.

== Members ==
- Alex Brown Church – guitar, vocals
- Lisa Fendelander – keyboards
- Joey Ficken – drums
- Scott Leahy – guitar

== Discography ==
- Get To The River Before It Runs Too Low (EP) (Dangerbird Records, 2007)
- Leaves in the River (Dangerbird, 2007)
- White Water, White Bloom (Dangerbird, 2009)
- Old World Romance (Dangerbird, 2012)
- Song Spells, No. 1: Cedarsmoke (self-released, 2014)
- Through A Dark Wood (Dangerbird, 2020)
- Through A Dark Wood (Deluxe) (Dangerbird, 2021)
