= Leaves in the River =

Studio album by Sea Wolf
- Released: September 25, 2007
- Recorded: 2007
- Genre: Indie pop, indie folk, indie rock, alternative
- Length: 35:31
- Label: Dangerbird Records
- Producer: Phil Ek, Alex Brown Church

Sea Wolf chronology
Get To The River Before It Runs Too Low (EP) (2007)	Leaves in the River (2007)	White Water, White Bloom (2009)

Leaves in the River is the full-length debut album by Sea Wolf, released on September 25, 2007.

The album was rated a 5.2 out of 10 by Pitchfork.

== Track listing ==
All songs by Alex Brown Church.

No.	Title	Length
1.	"Leaves in the River"	4:57
2.	"Winter Windows"	3:51
3.	"Black Dirt"	3:39
4.	"The Rose Captain"	3:40
5.	"Middle Distance Runner"	3:33
6.	"You're a Wolf"	3:35
7.	"Song for the Dead"	3:28
8.	"Black Leaf Falls"	3:25
9.	"The Cold, the Dark and the Silence"	4:28
10.	"Neutral Ground"	3:55
