= Ultimate Alternative Wavers =

1993 studio album by Built to Spill

Studio album by Built to Spill
- Released: May 1, 1993
- Recorded: Fall 1992
- Studios: Audio Labs (Boise, Idaho)
- Genre: Indie rock
- Length: 58:26
- Label: C/Z Records
- Producers: Built to Spill; Todd Dunnigan

Built to Spill chronology
Ultimate Alternative Wavers (1993)	There's Nothing Wrong with Love (1994)

Professional ratings
Review scores
Source	Rating
AllMusic	3.5/5 stars
Christgau's Consumer Guide	(1-star Honorable Mention)
The Encyclopedia of Popular Music	3/5 stars
MusicHound Rock	4/5 stars

Ultimate Alternative Wavers is the debut studio album by American indie rock band Built to Spill. The line-up consisted of Doug Martsch on guitar and vocals, Brett Netson on guitar and bass, and Ralf Youtz on drums, although there was some variation in instrumentation on a few tracks. The album was recorded at Audio Lab in Boise, Idaho, in the fall of 1992, and released in 1993 on C/Z Records. It was re-released in late 2006.

The song title "Nowhere Nothin' Fuckup" is the title of a song by the main character, Jason Taverner, in Philip K. Dick's Flow My Tears, the Policeman Said. The song's lyrics, also, are in large part borrowed from The Velvet Underground's "Oh! Sweet Nuthin'".

== Track listing ==
All tracks are written by Doug Martsch except "Nowhere Nothin' Fuckup" by Doug Martsch and Lou Reed.

No.	Title	Length
1.	"The First Song"	4:02
2.	"Three Years Ago Today"	3:56
3.	"Revolution"	4:25
4.	"Shameful Dread"	8:29
5.	"Nowhere Nothin' Fuckup"	6:34
6.	"Get a Life"	5:53
7.	"Built to Spill"	5:52
8.	"Lie for a Lie"	3:16
9.	"Hazy"	6:42
10.	"Built Too Long Parts 1, 2 & 3": "Part 1"; "Part 2"; "Part 3"	9:24: 1:35; 7:01; 0:48

=== Samples credits ===
"Shameful Dread"

- The Simpsons dialogue, "Marge Gets a Job"

"Built Too Long"

- "Rebel Without a Pause" by Public Enemy

== Personnel ==
Built to Spill

- Doug Martsch – guitars (all), vocals (1–9); bass noise (9), bass (10), snare (10)
- Brett Netson – bass (1–9); guitars (2–10), backing vocals (6), T.V. (8), stupid vocals (8), slide guitars (9), acoustic guitar (9), drums (10)
- Ralf Youtz – drums (all), cowbell (8), guitar (8), bass (10)

Additional musicians

- Todd Dunnigan – organ (1), piano (4, 10), synthesizer (9), guitar samples (10)
- James Dillon – piano (8)
- Jake Carpenter – violin (10)
