= There's Nothing Wrong with Love =

1994 studio album by Built to Spill

Studio album by Built to Spill
- Released: September 13, 1994
- Recorded: May–June 1994
- Studios: John & Stu's (Seattle, Washington)
- Genres: Indie rock; lo-fi
- Length: 46:48
- Label: Up
- Producer: Phil Ek

Built to Spill chronology
Ultimate Alternative Wavers (1993)	There's Nothing Wrong with Love (1994)	The Normal Years (1996)

Singles from There's Nothing Wrong with Love
- 1. "Car" Released: 1994

There's Nothing Wrong with Love is the second studio album released by American indie rock band Built to Spill. There's Nothing Wrong with Love was recorded in May and June 1994, and released September 13, 1994, on the Up Records label. It was produced by Phil Ek. The songs "Car" and "Distopian Dream Girl" were released as singles. Sub Pop reissued the album on vinyl in 2015. This is the only album to feature drummer Andy Capps and the first to feature bassist Brett Nelson.

== Background ==
The album has been considered a concept album based around a general theme of growing up. Among the topics: "[Frontman Doug] Martsch sings about everything from the erotic thrill of touching a girl's thumb during an elementary-school game of seven-up to the hip appeal of David Bowie." "Twin Falls" is named for the Idaho town. "That was the last record when I was able to make music without thinking a lot of people would hear it. It makes a difference. I’d like to think it doesn’t, but it does," Martsch later confided. Some lyrics, such as the one in "Distopian Dream Girl" about a stepfather who looks like Bowie, are fictionalized.

Several songs were inspired by Martsch's then-wife Karena Youtz. "Reasons" is a love song about her, "Cleo" is told from the perspective of their child in her womb and "Israel's Song" is about an autistic child that she worked with.

The video for "In the Morning" was featured on Beavis and Butt-head. An unlisted final track is a satirical preview of the next Built to Spill album; none of the clips on the track are real Built to Spill songs.

== Reception ==
Professional ratings
Review scores
Source	Rating
AllMusic	4/5 stars
Christgau's Consumer Guide	A−
Encyclopedia of Popular Music	3/5 stars
Melody Maker	5/5 stars
MusicHound Rock	2.5/5 stars
NME	7/10
Pitchfork	9.3/10
The Rolling Stone Album Guide	3.5/5 stars
Spectrum Culture	4/5 stars

Neil Strauss at the New York Times was positive in his 1995 assessment of the record, commenting: "With jagged layers of guitar, a piecemeal approach to pop music and sharp, introspective lyrics, the second album from this Boise, Idaho, band shined like a sequin on the dirty shirt of indie-rock." Entertainment Weekly's Ethan Smith called it "top-shelf songwriting." John Bush at AllMusic wrote, "Beneath the wacky guitar fooling and somewhat nasal vocals, Built to Spill write great love songs, whether its bouncy pop or fragile melodies." In a Pitchfork review, Steve Kandell writes, "Released in 1994, it’s an unassuming, lovely slab of lo-fi fuzz-pop about growing up, and not growing up, in Idaho, with picaresque lyrics about playing seven-up with grade-school crushes, driving nowhere in particular, loneliness, and the childlike wonder of staring up at the stars." Billboard characterized the album as full of "simple, head-bobbing songs." Chris DeVille at Stereogum ranked it the third best album by the band, calling it "a charmingly sophomoric sophomore release [..] Despite a few moments when the endearing tips over into the obnoxious, There’s Nothing Wrong With Love is the sound of scrappy mountain manchildren toying with their powers, pushing the limits of their form, setting the table for future tours de force." Upon its 2015 reissue, Jillian Mapes at Vulture opined: "The excitement Doug Martsch rings out of childhood anecdotes gone sideways with little more than his completely ordinary voice and his now-imitated guitar-playing (see: “Twin Falls”) is something to cherish, but so are the jangly, distorted rocking-out moments like “Big Dipper,” too."

== Legacy ==
Christopher Hess at The Austin Chronicle called it a "landmark indie album" in 1999. Mark Richardson, in a retrospective piece for Pitchfork, suggested that Love "has come to define a certain strand of indie rock, leaving a cluster of threads picked up by Modest Mouse, Death Cab for Cutie, and many more." Strauss mentioned it among the "CD's That Still Sound Good Years Later" in a 2004 New York Times ranking. Jon Dolan from Spin ranked it among the best albums of the 1990s: "[it] challenged slacker cynicism with basement-band symphonies that turned his own private Idaho into indie-rock’s last unknown country. [...] There’s Nothing Wrong With Love did for the guitar hero what Kurt Cobain had done for the rock star: subvert ego with touching vulnerability." The album was the first album PUP singer Stefan Babcock learned to play. Pitchfork ranked There's Nothing Wrong with Love #24 on its Top 100 Albums of the 90s list, and in 2026, it ranked the album #22 on its list of the 100 Best Indie Rock Albums of All Time.

The band announced a thirtieth anniversary tour of the album in 2024, alongside Yo La Tengo and Kicking Giant.

== Track listing ==
All tracks are written by Doug Martsch, except where noted.

No.	Title	Writer(s)	Length
1.	"In the Morning"	Martsch, Brett Netson	2:37
2.	"Reasons"		3:46
3.	"Big Dipper"		4:09
4.	"Car"	Martsch, Karena Youtz	2:59
5.	"Fling"		2:33
6.	"Cleo"	Martsch, Youtz	4:35
7.	"The Source"		3:20
8.	"Twin Falls"		1:49
9.	"Some"		5:57
10.	"Distopian Dream Girl"	Martsch, Brett Nelson, Andy Capps, James Christensen	4:24
11.	"Israel's Song"	Martsch, Nelson, Capps, Youtz	3:47
12.	"Stab"		5:29
13.	"Preview" (hidden track)		1:23

== Personnel ==
Built to Spill

- Doug Martsch – lead vocals, guitar
- Brett Nelson – bass
- Andy Capps – drums

Additional musicians

- Wayne Rhino Flower – guitar on "Big Dipper" and bass guitar on "Cleo"
- John McMahon – cello on "Fling" and "Stab"
- Gretchen Yanover – cello on "Car"
- Eric Akre – percussion on "Source" and "Twin Falls"
- Chad Shaver – guitar on "Midnite Star" (one of the songs in the unlisted preview track)
- Phil Ek – speaking voice on "Preview"
- Luke W. Midkiff – piano and keyboards
