= Phil Ek =

American record producer

Phil Ek is an American record producer, engineer and mixer. Ek began his career in Seattle, Washington in the early 1990s recording live sound in clubs. He then moved into studio recording, recording small projects and demos for local bands. Around this time, Ek was frequently working with influential producer Jack Endino. Producing Built to Spill's second album, There's Nothing Wrong with Love, proved to be Ek's mainstream breakthrough (the album has since ranked in the Top Ten of Spin Magazine's top indie records of all time). Along with Built to Spill, Phil Ek has also worked with such indie rock bands as Band of Horses, Fleet Foxes, Modest Mouse, Murder City Devils, The Shins, Duster, 764-HERO, Big Business and Mudhoney.

== Selected discography ==
Year	Band	Album
1994	Lync	These Are Not Fall Colors
1994	Built to Spill	There's Nothing Wrong with Love
1994	Butterfly Train	Building Distrust from Trust
1994	Green Apple Quick Step	Ludes and Cherry Bombs
1995	Earth	Phase 3: Thrones and Dominions
1997	Modest Mouse	The Lonesome Crowded West
1997	Built to Spill	Perfect from Now On
1998	Duster	Stratosphere
1998	Gas Huffer	Just Beautiful Music
1998	The Halo Benders	The Rebels Not In
1998	Caustic Resin	The Medicine Is All Gone
1999	Built to Spill	Keep It Like a Secret
1999	Built to Spill	Carry the Zero
2000	Modest Mouse	The Moon & Antarctica
2001	Built to Spill	Ancient Melodies of the Future
2001	The Murder City Devils	R.I.P
2001	Les Savy Fav	Go Forth
2001	Unwound	Leaves Turn Inside You
2002	Pretty Girls Make Graves	Good Health
2002	David Cross	Shut Up You Fucking Baby
2003	Pretty Girls Make Graves	The New Romance
2003	The Shins	Chutes Too Narrow
2005	Dios Malos	Dios
2005	Band of Horses	Everything All the Time
2006	Mudhoney	Under a Billion Suns
2006	Irving	Death in the Garden, Blood on the Flowers
2007	The Shins	Wincing the Night Away
2007	Terrene	The Indifferent Universe
2007	Band of Horses	Cease to Begin
2007	Sea Wolf	Leaves in the River
2008	Fleet Foxes	Fleet Foxes
2009	The Dodos	Time to Die
2009	Throw Me the Statue	Creaturesque
2009	Animal Kingdom	Signs and Wonders
2010	Shout Out Louds	Work
2010	Band of Horses	Infinite Arms
2011	Fleet Foxes	Helplessness Blues
2012	The Walkmen	Heaven
2012	Father John Misty	Fear Fun
2014	The Sidekicks	Runners in the Nerved World
2015	The Paper Kites	Twelvefour
2017	Fleet Foxes	Crack-Up
2017	The Black Angels	Death Song
2020	Smoke Fairies	Darkness Brings the Wonders Home
2024	Tyler Ramsey	New Lost Ages
2025	Dutch Interior	Moneyball
