= Keep It Like a Secret =

Studio album by Built to Spill
- Released: February 2, 1999
- Recorded: November 1997; April–May 1998
- Studios: Avast! Recording (Seattle, Washington); Bear Creek (Woodinville, Washington)
- Genres: Indie rock; alternative rock; dream pop
- Length: 46:53
- Labels: Warner Bros.; Up
- Producers: Phil Ek; Doug Martsch

Built to Spill chronology
Perfect from Now On (1997)	Keep It Like a Secret (1999)	Live (2000)

Singles from Keep It Like a Secret
- 1. "Center of the Universe" Released: 1999; 2. "Carry the Zero" Released: 1999

Keep It Like a Secret is the fourth studio album released by American indie rock band Built to Spill, and their second for Warner Bros. Records.

The initial tracks for the album were recorded in November 1997 at Bear Creek Studios in Woodinville, Washington by Phil Ek, with overdubs recorded on mid-1998 at Avast! Recording Co. in Seattle, Washington. Keep It Like a Secret was released on February 2, 1999. The album spawned two singles: "Carry the Zero" and "Center of the Universe".

== Background ==
After feeling burned out from constructing the lengthy songs on his previous album, Perfect from Now On, Doug Martsch made a conscious decision to write shorter, more concise songs for Keep It Like a Secret.

== Recording ==
Many of the songs on the album originated from a week's worth of band jam sessions in Boise. During these marathon jam sessions, which could last up to five hours at a time, Martsch used a foot pedal that triggered a tape machine to begin recording. He would later comb through the hours of recorded music and find parts that he liked, methodically building them into songs.

The song "You Were Right" features a collage of famous lyrics from songs by The Rolling Stones ("You Can't Always Get What You Want"), The Doors ("The End"), Jimi Hendrix ("Manic Depression"), Bob Dylan ("A Hard Rain's a-Gonna Fall"), Bob Marley ("No Woman, No Cry"), Neil Young ("Don't Be Denied"), John Mellencamp (Jack and Diane"), Kansas ("Dust in the Wind"), Bob Seger ("Against the Wind"), and Pink Floyd ("Another Brick in the Wall"). "You Were Right" almost didn't make the album due to perceived copyright issues. At the last minute, Warner Bros. Records secured permission for the band to use the lyrics. In a 1999 interview with The A.V. Club, Martsch described how he wrote the song: "...I came up with the chorus, 'You were wrong when you said, 'Everything's gonna be all right,' and then I decided the verse would be, 'You were right when you said...' something more pessimistic. And then I knew immediately that it was going to be a bunch of clichés, and I decided to use other people's clichés."

== Reception ==
Professional ratings
Aggregate scores
Source	Rating
Metacritic	79/100
Review scores
Source	Rating
AllMusic	4/5 stars
The Austin Chronicle	5/5 stars
Entertainment Weekly	B
Melody Maker	4/5 stars
NME	7/10
Pitchfork	9.3/10
Rolling Stone	3.5/5 stars
The Rolling Stone Album Guide	4/5 stars
Select	3/5
Spin	9/10

Keep It Like a Secret received mostly positive reviews when it was first released. On Metacritic, the album has a score of 79 out of 100, indicating "generally positive reviews."

Pitchfork's Jason Josephes praised the album, writing "at the risk of hopping on a cliché wagon, I think I'm gonna tell all my friends about Built to Spill." In another positive review, AllMusic's Stephen Thomas Erlewine called Keep It Like a Secret "the most immediate and, yes, accessible Built to Spill record," writing that the band "embraced the sounds of a big studio and focused their sound without sacrificing their fractured indie rock aesthetic." Kim Stitzel of MTV called the album "a great (and different) Built to Spill record, proudly displaying its strengths and reveling in its uniqueness even while making concessions to a changing world." Christopher Hess of The Austin Chronicle wrote that Doug Martsch's "guitar vocabulary [...] gives 'Center of the Universe' an intrinsically bright tone, and infuses 'Else' with stunning beauty," while praising Scott Plouf's drumming as being "spot on throughout, providing active punctuation for the multiple layers of guitar." Spin's Will Hermes also praised Martsch's guitar playing, writing that "Martsch is still [...] making the most beautiful baroque electric guitar murals in modern rock. Robert Christgau gave the album a two-star honorable mention rating and selected "You Were Right" and "Center of the Universe" as highlights.

Not all contemporary reviews were positive. Trouser Press called Keep It Like a Secret "pure BTS, but without enough sparkle or rough-hewn beauty to be memorable." In another mixed review, Q wrote, "Built to Spill sound as if they're trying too hard, and ultimately both The Flaming Lips and Mercury Rev do this sort of thing with far more panache."

=== Legacy ===
In 1999, Pitchfork ranked the album at number 41 on their "Top Albums of the 90s" list. In a retrospective review published in 2013, Kevin McFarland of The A.V. Club called the album "perhaps the best encapsulation of the band's oeuvre and the ever-simmering public response in a single phrase." Pitchfork named the album the best album of 1999. Staff writer Garrett Martin explained: "Built to Spill essentially has two fanbases, the indie-pop kids who loved 1994’s There’s Nothing Wrong With Love and the fans of rock god virtuosity who consider 1997’s sprawling Perfect From Now On to be truly perfect. 1999’s Keep It Like A Secret is the band’s best album because it falls perfectly in-between those two extremes. It’s full of amazingly catchy rock songs with fantastic guitar work and Doug Martsch’s nostalgic lyrics and elegiac, Neil Young-ian voice."

== Track listing ==
All songs written by Built to Spill except "Broken Chairs," which includes lyrics by the poet Uhuru Black.

No.	Title	Length
1.	"The Plan"	3:29
2.	"Center of the Universe"	2:43
3.	"Carry the Zero"	5:44
4.	"Sidewalk"	3:51
5.	"Bad Light"	3:22
6.	"Time Trap"	5:22
7.	"Else"	4:09
8.	"You Were Right"	4:45
9.	"Temporarily Blind"	4:48
10.	"Broken Chairs"	8:40
Total length:		46:53

Vinyl edition bonus track
No.	Title	Length
11.	"Forget Remember When"	4:11
Total length:		51:04

== Charts ==
Chart (1999)	Peak position
Norwegian Albums (VG-lista)	37
US Billboard 200	120

== Personnel ==
=== Built to Spill ===
- Doug Martsch
- Brett Nelson
- Scott Plouf

=== Additional musicians ===
- Sam Coomes – keyboards on "Broken Chairs"

=== Production ===
- Phil Ek – producer, engineer
- Steve Fallone – mastering
- Zack Reinig – engineer assistant
- Scott Norton, Juan Garcia – mixing assistant
- Jeff Smith – photography
- Tae Won Yu – design, art direction
