= Treepeople =

American alternative rock band

- Origin: Boise, Idaho
- Genres: Indie rock, alternative rock, post-punk, grunge
- Years active: 1988–1994, 2018–2023
- Labels: K Records; C/Z Records; Silence Records; Toxic Shock Records; Sonic Bubblegum Records
- Members: Doug Martsch; Wayne Flower; Scott Schmaljohn; Troy Wright
- Past members: Pat Brown; Tony Reed; Eric Akre; Eric Carnell; John Polle

Treepeople was an alternative rock band from Boise, Idaho, although its members were officially based in Seattle, Washington. The band was originally composed of vocalist/guitarist Scott Schmaljohn, drummer Wayne Flower, guitarist/vocalist Doug Martsch, and bassist Pat Brown (Schmaljohn's older brother). After six albums and various lineup changes, the band disbanded in 1994. The band's original lineup reformed in 2018, except for Brown due to his death in 1999. They eventually concluded their final tour in 2023.

== History ==
Brown, Flower, and Schmaljohn were ex-members of the Boise punk band State of Confusion. The three would link up with Martsch and form Treepeople in 1988. Their early influences included Hüsker Dü, the Replacements, Sonic Youth, Butthole Surfers, Pixies, and Dinosaur Jr.

The original lineup recorded the No Mouth Pipetting self-released album in 1989. After playing numerous regional shows, the band officially relocated from Boise to Seattle, and then released the Time Whore EP in 1990. The band's next album was Guilt Regret Embarrassment in 1991, released through two small labels, Toxic Shock Records and K Records. Later that same year, Flower left the band, and Tony Reed was recruited as the new drummer. This lineup would record the Something Vicious for Tomorrow EP; however, the band had more label backing on this release, as they had signed with the label C/Z Records, and would stay with them for the remainder of their career. The label wanted to make the release a full-length; thus, they included the previously released Time Whore EP as an add-on.

Shortly before the recording of the next album, Brown had left the band. He was replaced by drummer-turned-bassist Reed, and Eric Akre was added on for drums. This lineup would release its next album Just Kidding in 1993. By the end of the year, Schmaljohn would change the lineup yet again, with John Polle replacing Martsch on guitars and Eric Carnell replacing Reed on bass; however, drummer Akre stayed on board. Martsch would move on with the band Built to Spill. The band's final album became Actual Re-Enactment in 1994. Although it was released on C/Z Records again, there were internal issues with the label, mainly a distribution deal with Sony which financially damaged C/Z Records; thus, their resources to promote the band's album became limited. After losing members to family complications and other projects, Treepeople disbanded later that same year.

Schmaljohn later played in Stuntman, The Hand, and The Treatment. Schmaljohn also guested on Built to Spill's 2009 album There Is No Enemy, playing on the song "Pat", a tribute to Brown, who committed suicide in April 1999. Prior to his death, Brown fronted the band Hive. Flower went on to play in Violent Green and The Halo Benders with Martsch and Calvin Johnson (of Beat Happening, Dub Narcotic, and also the co-founder of K Records).

Treepeople reformed in 2018 with Troy Wright taking over bass duties for Brown. Wright was also the last drummer for State of Confusion. Treepeople performed at the 2018 Treefort music festival and played in Portland, Seattle, Vancouver, San Francisco, Los Angeles, San Diego, Phoenix, Tucson, Albuquerque, and Denver. After the COVID-19 pandemic, Treepeople finished their last ever tour in August 2023, playing shows in Boise, Portland, Seattle, and Bellingham.

== Members ==
=== Final members ===
- Scott Schmaljohn – vocals, guitars (1988–1994, 2018–2023)
- Doug Martsch – guitars, vocals (1988–1993, 2018–2023)
- Wayne Flower – drums (1988–1991, 2018–2023)
- Troy Wright – bass (2018–2023)

=== Past members ===
- Pat Brown – bass (1988–1992); died 1999
- Tony Reed – drums (1991–1992), bass (1992–1993)
- Eric Akre – drums (1992–1994)
- John Polle – guitars (1993–1994)
- Eric Carnell – bass (1993–1994)

== Discography ==
=== Studio albums ===
- No Mouth Pipetting 1989 (Silence Records)
- Time Whore EP 1990 (Silence Records)
- Guilt Regret Embarrassment 1991 (Toxic Shock Records/K Records)
- Something Vicious for Tomorrow EP 1992 (C/Z Records)
- Just Kidding 1993 (C/Z Records)
- Actual Re-Enactment 1994 (C/Z Records)

=== Singles ===
- Important Things 7" 1988 (Silence Records)
- Makin' The D 7" 1990 (Battery Records)
- Mistake 7" 1991 (Sonic Bubblegum Records)
- split w/ House of Large Sizes 7" 1991 (Toxic Shock Records)
- Outside In 7" 1992 (C/Z Records)
- Hide and Find Out 7" 1993 (Soil Records)
- split w/ Archers Of Loaf 2x7" 1994 (Sonic Bubblegum Records)

=== Compilations ===
- Hard to Believe: Kiss Covers Compilation 1990 (C/Z Records)
- Our Band Could Be Your Life: A Tribute to D Boon and the Minutemen 1994 (Little Brother Records)
- GRE Bonus Tracks 12" reissue 2018 (Silence Records)
