= Jim Roth (musician) =

American guitarist, singer and songwriter

Jim Roth (born 1962) is an American guitarist, singer and songwriter from Des Moines, Iowa. He has played with several indie bands including The Chant, Sinister Sons, The Delusions, Voodoo Gearshift, Helvetia, and The Hollowmen. He also has released a solo album called Anti-Rad. Roth also played guitar in Built to Spill. He initially started playing with them on the Keep It Like a Secret tour, when The Delusions were opening, but was a full-time member of the band by the time You in Reverse was released.
