= Brett Nelson (musician) =

American songwriter

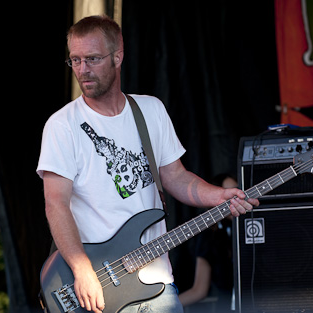

Background information
- Born: 1969 (age 56–57)
- Origin: Boise, Idaho, United States
- Genre: Indie rock
- Instruments: Vocals, guitar, bass, keyboards

Brett Nelson (born 1969) is an American multi-instrumentalist, singer and songwriter best known as the former bassist for the indie rock band Built to Spill.

== Early career and influences ==
In high school, Nelson played in a band called Farm Days along with Doug Martsch and Andy Capps. Nelson's next band, Butterfly Train, released two albums on Up Records, in 1994 and 1996, before breaking up (Andy Capps was drummer for the latter album).

Talking to Impose about his inspirations to become a musician, Nelson mentioned records by Orchestral Manoeuvres in the Dark, the Replacements, A Flock of Seagulls, The Jesus and Mary Chain, Firehose, Dinosaur Jr., and Ride.

== Built to Spill and later career ==
In 1994, Nelson and Andy Capps joined Martsch's Built to Spill.

Nelson appeared on every album from There's Nothing Wrong with Love to There Is No Enemy.

Nelson sings and plays guitar and keyboards for The Suffocation Keep, which released its debut album John Hughes Was Never So Wrong in 2002. The band completed a second album in 2004, A Few Minor Modifications of the Stars. The album was never released; however, the band did make it available for free download.

Nelson lives in Boise, Idaho. He sometimes calls himself "Brett Not Netson" or "breLson" to distinguish himself from Built to Spill bandmate Brett Netson.

In November 2009, Nelson re-recorded seven Built To Spill songs "synthesizer/drum machine only" with bandmate Doug Martsch re-singing the songs and released it as an EP titled The Electronic Anthology Project in July 2010.
The new edition of The Electronic Anthology Project takes nine songs from Dinosaur Jr. with new vocals by J Mascis. It was released on Record Store Day, April 21, 2012, in a limited edition of 500 purple vinyl copies (with digital, CD and standard vinyl to follow).

Brett Nelson departed from Built to Spill, along with then-drummer Scott Plouf, in 2012, after 18 years with the band. The reasons behind the decision are said to be benevolent. Nelson was replaced by Jason Albertini and Scott Plouf by Steve Gere. Built to Spill promptly began touring again in early 2013.

After his exit from Built to Spill, Nelson joined Sleepy Seeds. They self-released their only album on June 24, 2014.

After Sleepy Seeds disbanded in 2015, Nelson started a four-piece post-wave band called Sick Wish featuring his son Jonah Nelson.
