= Built to Spill =

American indie rock band

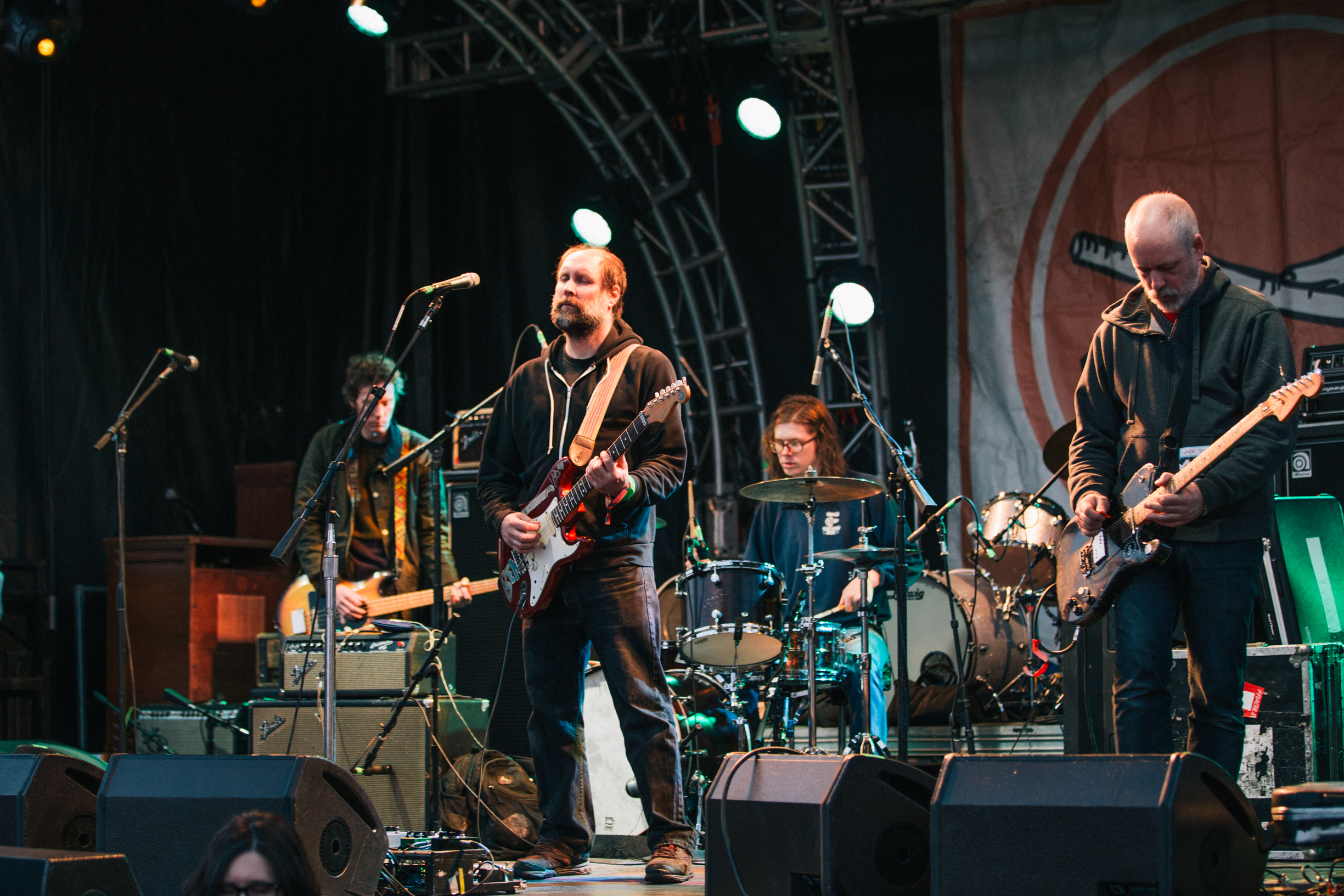
- Built to Spill at Treefort Music Fest 2016

Background information
- Origin: Boise, Idaho, U.S.
- Genres: Indie rock; alternative rock; lo-fi; slacker rock; power pop
- Years active: 1992–present
- Labels: C/Z; Up; City Slang; Warner Bros.; ATP Recordings; Ernest Jenning; Sub Pop
- Members: Doug Martsch; Melanie Radford; Teresa Esguerra
- Past members: Brett Netson; Ralf Youtz; Andy Capps; Brett Nelson; Scott Plouf; Jim Roth; Steve Gere; Jason Albertini
- Website: www.builttospill.com

Built to Spill is an American indie rock band that was formed in Boise, Idaho, in 1992. Centered on lead vocalist and guitarist Doug Martsch, the only permanent member, Built to Spill has released nine albums since its inception. Martsch originally envisioned the band to feature a changing set of backing musicians for each album, but eventually settled with a stable lineup for over a decade before returning to his original plan in 2012.

Having received consistent critical acclaim throughout their career, three of the band's albums—There's Nothing Wrong with Love, Perfect from Now On and Keep It Like a Secret—placed in the top 50 of Pitchfork's Top 100 Albums of the 1990s list. Keep It Like a Secret was the band's first album to chart on the Billboard 200 in the United States, while their 2009 release There Is No Enemy became Built to Spill's highest-charting album of their career.

== History ==
=== Formation, debut and There's Nothing Wrong with Love (1992–1995) ===
Former Treepeople guitarist/vocalist Doug Martsch formed Built to Spill in 1992 with Brett Netson and Ralf Youtz as the band's original members. In an interview with Spin, Martsch stated that he intended to change the band's lineup for every album, himself being the only permanent member. The band's name came from an invented phrase in an exquisite corpse-like game Martsch played with his wife. After the band's first album, Ultimate Alternative Wavers, was released in 1993, Netson and Youtz were replaced by Brett Nelson and Andy Capps for 1994's There's Nothing Wrong with Love. A compilation album called The Normal Years followed, which included recordings by both lineups. Built to Spill Caustic Resin, an EP that features Martsch with the members of Caustic Resin, was released in 1995. Between recording albums in 1995, the band gained exposure by playing on the Lollapalooza tour. Also in 1995, the band collaborated on the song "Still Flat" for the AIDS benefit album Red Hot + Bothered, produced by the Red Hot Organization.

=== First Warner Bros. period (1995–2002) ===
Martsch signed Built to Spill to Warner Bros. Records in 1995 for a three-album deal. Unlike many artists signed to major labels, the deal the band brokered with Warner Bros. allowed it to retain a large degree of creative control over future albums. Built to Spill produced its first major-label release in 1997 with Perfect from Now On. The album marked a departure from the band's earlier work, with 7 of its 8 tracks stretching beyond the 6-minute mark. As Martsch later explained, "I didn’t like the idea of our stuff being played on the radio a bunch, and I didn’t want us to have a hit." In spite of its unorthodox approach, Perfect from Now On was met with critical success, and Built to Spill became one of the United States' most recognizable indie rock bands of the early 1990s. Before releasing another album, Martsch made Brett Nelson (bass) and Scott Plouf (drums) permanent members of the band. In 1999, the band released Keep It Like a Secret to continued critical success and for the first time, significant commercial success; it debuted at No. 120 on the Billboard 200 and a year after its release had sold 60,000 copies. The band's first live album, Live was released in 2000. By 2001, the band's three albums for Warner Bros. had sold a combined 200,000 copies in the US. The band's fifth studio album, Ancient Melodies of the Future, was released in 2001.

In 2002, Martsch released Now You Know, a solo album with both blues and folk elements. He performed numerous solo concerts in support of the album. Built to Spill was on hiatus for most of this period.

=== Second Warner Bros. period (2002–2017) ===
In 2003, Warner Bros. Records optioned the band for another album. From 2003 to 2005, Built to Spill toured extensively, performing over 150 dates that included new songs from as early as 2004. Its sixth studio album, You in Reverse, was recorded in Portland in 2004 but was not released until April 11, 2006. The band's official lineup for the album was Martsch, Nelson, Plouf, and Jim Roth, who was formerly only a touring guitarist. Brett Netson provided guitar work on several songs and later rejoined the band as a full-time member.

After the release of You in Reverse, Built to Spill continued touring almost non-stop. In March 2006, Martsch suffered a detached retina, which required surgery. This forced the band to miss an appearance at the South by Southwest music festival and postpone several dates of the tour. Even worse news came when former drummer Andy Capps was found dead in his home on May 18, 2006.

The band resumed touring on June 3, 2006, with a show that included four new songs. This show and many on the tour included the dedication of the song "Car" to Capps, who had played on the track when it was recorded.

Warner Bros. Records stated that Built to Spill had been recording its follow-up to You in Reverse on and off during the 2006 tour, but nothing appeared until the July 10, 2007 release of a 12" single, "They Got Away"/"Re-Arrange". "They Got Away" is a heavily reggae-influenced original song, while "Re-Arrange" is a cover of a song by the reggae band the Gladiators.

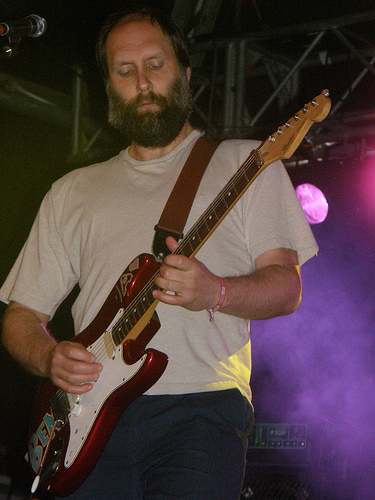
Doug Martsch performing with the band at Primavera Sound Festival in 2007.

The US tour was scheduled through October 2007, followed by an Australian tour. Martsch stated in a September 2007 interview that he didn't want to tour in the United States again until the band records; however, the band then announced a one-month US national tour for spring of 2008.

In a March 2008 interview with Playback:stl, Martsch spoke of new material from the Halo Benders, a collaboration between Martsch, Calvin Johnson, Steve Fisk, former Treepeople member Wayne "Rhino" Flower, and original Built to Spill drummer Ralf Youtz, but "we started that about a year ago, we have not even got anything off the ground." Later in the interview, Martsch gave his perspective on the future of Built to Spill past the current material; "I do think that Built to Spill could be something better than ever just because our lineup is better than ever ... I think there is potential for the five of us to collaborate on something that is just way better than anything that I have ever come up with by myself or that we have done in the past." Martsch also interjected that "This coming record we're not doing that—it's mostly going to be songs that I have been working on." The band extended its 2008 tour in the United States and Europe, performing the album Perfect from Now On in its entirety.

In 2009, the band announced its next album, There Is No Enemy. The tracklist and album art were revealed on August 17, 2009, the first single, "Hindsight", was released on September 8, and the album was released on October 6, 2009. The band toured from August through November 2009 and for much of 2010, including performances at the Pitchfork Music Festival and the All Tomorrow's Parties festival, curated by The Simpsons creator Matt Groening.

In July 2010, Martsch appeared on the first release from Brett Nelson's the Electric Anthology Project, in which Nelson creates covers from an artist in a synth-pop style, featuring the vocalist from the original version. This self-titled EP, which featured one song from each Built to Spill record (using anagrams of their original titles) and newly recorded vocals by Doug Martsch, received a moderately favorable review in Pitchfork, even though "it was obviously released as a goof," and the "good moments almost make you wish Martsch had taken this concept more seriously." In September 2010, the band released a video for its single "Hindsight" from There Is No Enemy, directed by Bob Odenkirk.

On October 25, 2012, Built to Spill played a secret, invitation-only show at the Bunk Bar in Portland, Oregon, with a new rhythm section consisting of Jason Albertini (Helvetia, Duster) on bass and Stephen Gere (Uzala, Brett Netson Band, Atomic Mama) on drums. On January 7, 2013, Martsch, Netson and guitarist Jim Roth announced that Albertini and Gere would be permanent replacements for Plouf and Nelson, who were departing the band amicably. Built to Spill continued touring periodically as a five-piece but didn't release another album for several years. Martsch would later state that a 2012 album was abandoned due to the departure of Nelson and Plouf and his dissatisfaction with the songs.

Untethered Moon was released on April 18, 2015. The album was recorded as a trio with Martsch, Albertini, and Gere and was co-produced by Martsch and frequent Built to Spill guest keyboardist and Quasi frontman Sam Coomes. The band toured summer/fall 2015 in support of the new album.

Brett Netson and Jim Roth left the band in the latter half of 2015 and a trio lineup of Martsch, Albertini and Gere debuted on a spring 2016 West Coast run.

=== Post-Warner Bros. years (2017–present) ===
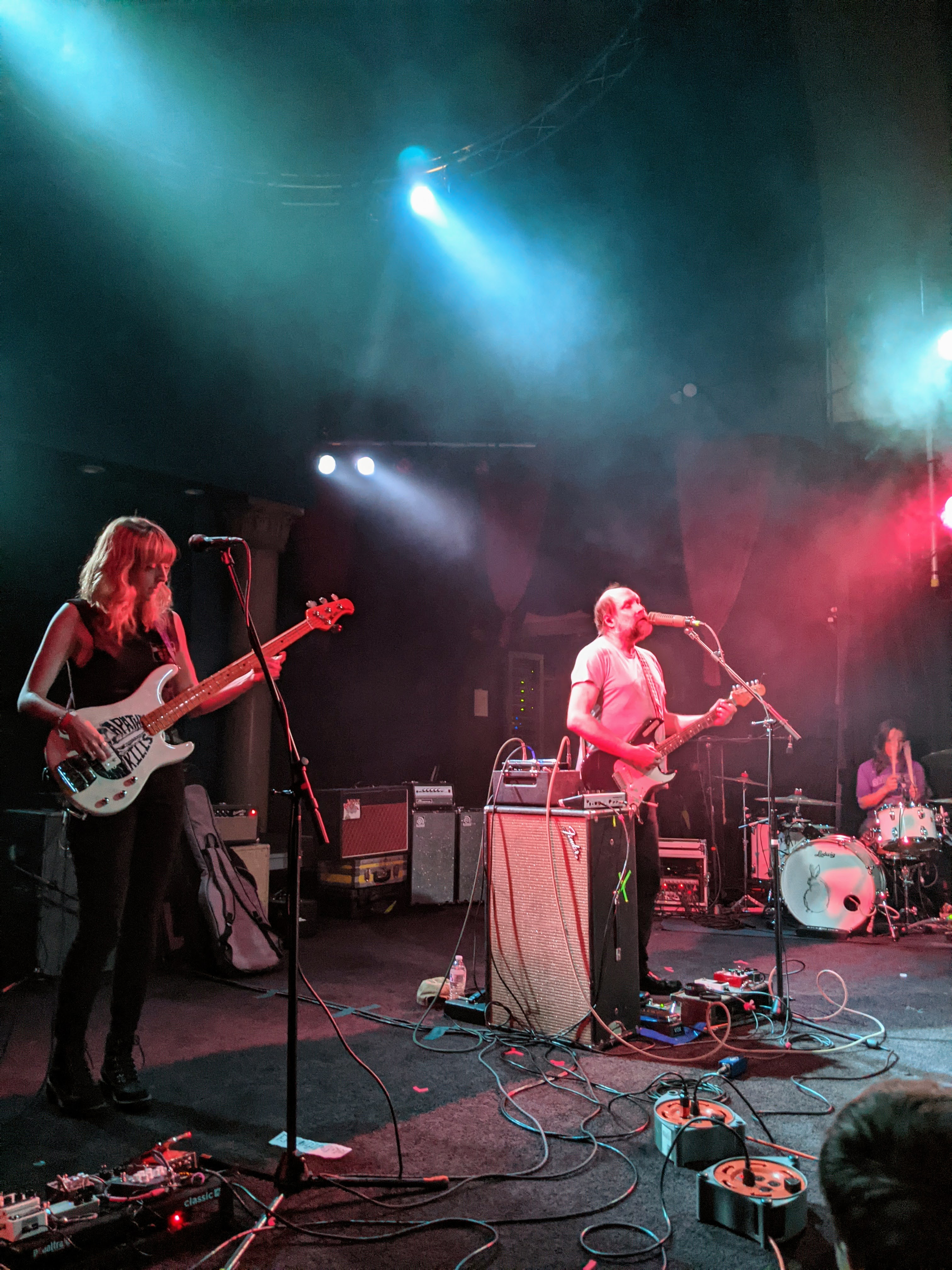
Performing at Mr. Small's in Pittsburgh, Pennsylvania, in 2023

On September 14, 2017, Built to Spill announced that they would leave Warner Bros. after 22 years.

In October 2018, Martsch announced on Facebook that the band will return to his initial idea of having a shifting rotation of members for each release. Brazilian musicians João Casaes and Lê Almeida served as the rhythm section for a set of South American shows. In 2019, the band added Melanie Radford of Blood Lemon on bass and Teresa Esguerra of Prism Bitch on drums. On June 12, 2020, they released the cover album Built to Spill Plays the Songs of Daniel Johnston.

The band signed to Sub Pop in October 2021. On September 9, 2022, the band released their first album of new material since 2015, When the Wind Forgets Your Name. The album was recorded with Casaes and Almeida on rhythm prior to the COVID-19 pandemic. In 2024, they announced a 30th anniversary tour for There's Nothing Wrong With Love, which started in August, during which the album was performed in full each night.

== Musical style ==
Built to Spill are generally labeled as an indie rock band. Tim Sendra of AllMusic named Built to Spill "one of the most popular and influential indie rock bands", and noted the band's stylistic evolution from "sparse lo-fi" early in their career towards a sound described as "sophisticated emo" later on. He further described the band's sound as an intermixture of "postmodern, Pavement-style pop" and the "loose, spacious jamming" associated with the likes of Neil Young.

Built to Spill's work has been said to have been an influence on alternative rock acts such as Modest Mouse and Death Cab for Cutie. Yardbarker wrote, "Every guitar-solo heavy, bombastic indie band of the new millennium owes a little something to Built to Spill."

== Members ==
=== Current line-up ===
- Doug Martsch – lead vocals, guitar, keyboards (1992–present)
- Melanie Radford – bass (2019–present)
- Teresa Esguerra – drums (2019–present)

=== Former members ===
- Brett Netson – bass (1992–1993), guitar (2007–2015; session/touring musician 1997–2007)
- Ralf Youtz – drums (1992–1993)
- Brett Nelson – bass (1993–2012), drums (2001)
- Andy Capps – drums (1993–1996; died 2006)
- Scott Plouf – drums (1996–2012), bass (2001)
- Jim Roth – guitar (2006–2015; touring musician 1999-2006)
- Jason Albertini – bass (2012–2018)
- Stephen Gere – drums (2012–2018)
- João Casaes – bass (2018–2019)
- Lê Almeida – drums (2018–2019)

=== Former touring members ===
- Dave Schneider – drums (1994–1995)
- James Bertram – bass (1994–1995)
- Louis McFarland – drums (2019)

== Discography ==
- Ultimate Alternative Wavers (1993)
- There's Nothing Wrong with Love (1994)
- Perfect from Now On (1997)
- Keep It Like a Secret (1999)
- Ancient Melodies of the Future (2001)
- You in Reverse (2006)
- There Is No Enemy (2009)
- Untethered Moon (2015)
- When the Wind Forgets Your Name (2022)
