= Caustic Resin =

American indie rock group

- Origin: Boise, Idaho, U.S.
- Genres: Metal; indie rock; alternative rock; space rock
- Years active: 1988–2003; 2014–present
- Labels: Up, Alias
- Members: Brett Netson; James Dillion; Pat Perkins
- Past members: Mike Johnson; Joe Plummer; Tom Romich Jr.

Caustic Resin is an American indie rock band from Boise, Idaho consisting of Brett Netson on guitar and vocals, Tom Romich Jr. on bass guitar, and James Dillion or Pat Perkins on drums.

== Biography ==
Caustic Resin formed in Boise, Idaho in 1988, the original lineup consisted of guitarist/singer Brett Netson (formerly of local punk outfit the Pugs), bassist Tom Romich Jr., and drummer Pat Perkins. They began playing mostly heavy metal venues, but soon began performing with Treepeople. Netson has long been associated with Doug Martsch, who founded Built to Spill in 1992 with Netson as an original member. Caustic Resin and Built to Spill have continued to collaborate, and released the joint EP Built to Spill Caustic Resin in 1995.

After signing to Up Records, Caustic Resin subsequently released Fly Me to the Moon in 1995. Produced by Phil Ek, the album was a departure from earlier metal-influenced work and a transition to alternative and space rock.

In 1998, Caustic Resin released The Medicine Is All Gone, their first album on Alias Records. They released Trick Question in 1999, which featured bassist Mike Johnson of Dinosaur Jr. and Joe Plummer. The band released The Afterbirth in 2000, their last album for Alias before returning to Up Records. In the meantime, Netson played and toured with Built to Spill. Finally, in 2003, Caustic Resin returned with Keep on Truckin, which featured original drummer Pat Perkins and split bass duties between Romich and Johnson.

Caustic Resin has been on indefinite hiatus since 2003, though they appeared at Treefort Music Fest in 2014.

Since the band's indefinite hiatus, Netson became a member of Earth, and toured with Boris in 2016. Romich continued to work as a musician in Boise, and Perkins became a web developer, working at the College of Western Idaho and the Idaho Department of Fish and Game.

On 15 January 2025, it was announced that Tom Romich had died.

== Discography ==
=== Albums ===
- Body Love/Body Hate (C/Z, September 12, 1993)
- Fly Me to the Moon (Up, 1995)
- The Medicine Is All Gone (Alias, 1998)
- Trick Question (Alias, 1999)
- The After Birth (Alias, 2000)
- Keep On Truckin' (Up, 2003)

=== Singles ===
- "Yeah, Right" (Up, 1995)
