= Doug Martsch =

American singer and musician (born 1969)

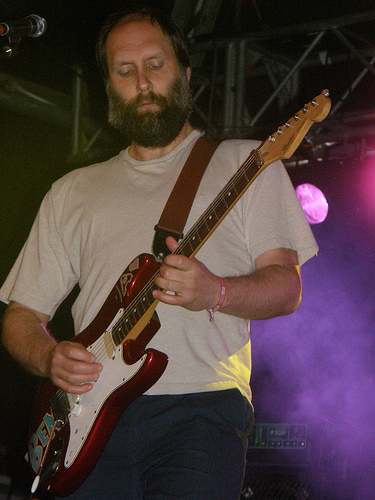

Background information
- Born: Douglas G. Martsch; September 16, 1969 (age 57); Twin Falls, Idaho, U.S.
- Origin: Boise, Idaho, U.S.
- Genre: Indie rock
- Occupations: Musician; songwriter
- Instruments: Vocals, guitar, bass, keyboards, percussion
- Years active: 1988–present
- Labels: Up, Warner, Sub Pop

Doug Martsch (born September 16, 1969) is an American singer and musician, best known as the lead vocalist and guitarist of the indie rock band Built to Spill.

== Career ==
Martsch's first band was Farm Days, with Andy Capps and Brett Nelson in the early 1980s. His second band was Treepeople, with whom he released three albums and two EPs. He has been the lead singer and guitarist of Built to Spill since 1992. With Built to Spill, he developed a reputation as a preeminent indie rock guitarist; his guitar playing style blends rock, pop, blues, and folk. His influences include J Mascis, Jimi Hendrix, Led Zeppelin, Caustic Resin, Mississippi Fred McDowell, David Bowie, and Neil Young.

In 1994, Martsch formed The Halo Benders with Calvin Johnson of Beat Happening and released three albums.

In 2002, Martsch released his first solo album, Now You Know. In 2011, he contributed to a tribute album to The Smiths entitled Please, please, please... with a cover of "Reel Around The Fountain".

== Personal life ==
Martsch was previously married to Built to Spill co-lyricist Karena Youtz, the sister of former Built to Spill member Ralf Youtz. They have a son.
