= Sharks Keep Moving =

American rock band

- Origin: Seattle
- Genres: Indie rock Math rock
- Years active: 1997–2002
- Label: Status Recordings
- Past members: Jake Snider; Nathan Turpen; J. Clark; Dan Dean; Jeff DeGolier; Morgan Henderson

Sharks Keep Moving were a short-lived Seattle rock band that formed in 1998. The band's original lineup consisted of Jake Snider (guitar/vocals), Nathan Turpen (guitar), Jeff DeGolier (bass), and Dan Dean (drums). Their music was a melodic, often soft, brand of rock with odd time signatures and an almost freeform jazz influence.

== History ==
Snider, Turpen, and DeGolier had all previously played in the respected Seattle indie band State Route 522, and had released material with Seattle's Excursion Records under that name. State Route 522 broke up in 1997, following the release of their Samson Is Apollo EP for Excursion. Jay Clark was still playing with Kill Sadie but worked with the band as another guitarist. Within the next year, Snider, Turpen, and DeGolier found themselves playing together again, but this time leaving behind the post-hardcore sound of their previous band in favor of a much more melodic, but no less technical approach to their music. The band recruited Dan Dean (former drummer of nineironspitfire, another Seattle hardcore band) to round out the lineup. Snider has been quoted as saying that he chose the name Sharks Keep Moving after seeing the term used as a headline for a magazine article.

Sharks Keep Moving picked up quickly in the independent rock scene, partially because State Route 522 had found more of fanbase after their demise then they had during their existence. The first recorded output for Sharks Keep Moving came in the form of a split 7-inch with fellow Seattle natives The Kentucky Pistol (which featured brothers Sonny and Rocky Votolato, later members of Bugs In Amber and Waxwing, respectively). The record was released by Snider on his own label, Henry's Finest Recordings, and caught the attention of independent music labels Status Recordings, and Second Nature Recordings, who both expressed interest in releasing material with the band.

The band's next release was the Desert Strings and Drifters EP on Second Nature. Recorded by respected Seattle producer Matt Bayles, the four-song EP showed the band delve deeper into melody and odd time-signatures. Lengthy songs and sparse vocals set the tone for the group's later efforts, along with the incorporation of cello (played by Snider's future wife, Stephanie Goldade). Desert Strings and Drifters was fairly well received among independent rock critics, but the group remained largely unknown outside of their home area. They continued to play locally as well as up and down the west coast.

The same year, Sharks Keep Moving recorded two compilation tracks – “Westcott Bay, 1998” was recorded at their home studio for the Living Silent compilation on Status, while the instrumental track “Logger” appeared on the It Goes Without Saying compilation, a CD of all-instrumental songs released by Sign Language Records.

Around this time, Jeff DeGolier left the band and Morgan Henderson (also of The Blood Brothers) joined as the group's new bassist. It was this lineup that recorded the group's only full-length LP. Released by Status in 1999, the record was simply titled Full Length Album and further explored and solidified the sound set forth on their EP. Again recorded with Matt Bayles, the LP consisted of eight songs (four of which were instrumental) of considerable length, and moved the band into a sound that was even less easy to define than before. Again the record met with fairly high praises from critics, but the band still remained largely unknown, partially due to their inability to tour extensively in support of the record.

In the following year, less and less was heard from Sharks Keep Moving, and after a long period of little to no activity, most assumed that they had broken up, although no official announcement was made. At some point during this hiatus, Dan Dean left the band, and was replaced by former Kill Sadie member J. Clark on drums.

Status Recordings released the State Route 522 Retrospective CD in 2001 – a collection of all of that band's previous output, minus a few compilation appearances. Within the year, it had been announced that Sharks Keep Moving were, in fact, still a band, and were working on new material. Again, nothing materialized for a while, but Sharks members began to pop up in other bands. Jake Snider formed a new band, Minus the Bear, with Matt Bayles and former members of Botch and Kill Sadie, and also joined fellow Seattleite Tom Harpel's group, Onalaska. J. Clark started Pretty Girls Make Graves with former members of The Murder City Devils and Death Wish Kids, and Morgan Henderson continued to play with the increasingly popular The Blood Brothers.

In 2002, Sharks Keep Moving released their final recording - a three-song EP entitled Pause and Clause. Recorded by Snider with assistance from Onalaska bandmate Tom Harpel at Spectre Studios, the EP was again released by Status Recordings. A final testament to the band's ever-evolving musical talent, Pause and Clause showed Sharks Keep Moving pushing their signature sound even further into freeform jazz territory. Again, vocals were few and far between, with more complex and distinct guitar parts from Turpen and Snider laid over top of Clark's scattered, technical drumming, and Henderson's flowing basslines. The songs give a feeling of both improvisation and structured songwriting.

In support of the EP, the band toured the west coast for a few weeks before returning to Seattle. Despite hopes that the group would continue, the EP and tour seemed to be more a matter of the band not wanting to leave unfinished business. A final track, “Lime Green Café,” recorded during the Pause and Clause sessions, turned up on the Masculine Makeover compilation, a benefit compilation released by Satellite City. It was the last song released by Sharks Keep Moving.

In the following years, the members of Sharks Keep Moving have found considerably more success with their other bands than they had in Sharks. Snider continues to front the successful Minus the Bear, who have to date released six full-length albums (the newest being VOIDS, released on March 3, 2017) and three EPs with Seattle label Suicide Squeeze Records (four of which Matt Bayles produced). He also played with Onalaska on their full-length album, To Sing For Nights. Nathan Turpen took a break from music to return to college and in 2014 joined Heiress who have released albums with Deathwish Inc. and The Mylene Sheath. Morgan Henderson played with The Blood Brothers until their break up in 2007, and now plays with Past Lives (along with fellow Blood Brothers members Mark Gajadhar and Jordan Blilie). Clark remained a member of Pretty Girls Make Graves until their break-up in 2007, and later joined ex-Blood Brother members Johnny Whitney and Cody Votolato in Jaguar Love until he left in 2009. Henderson and Dan Dean also played as backing musicians on Rocky Votolato’s second full-length album, Burning My Travels Clean.

An odds and ends collection of Sharks Keep Moving material was announced by Status following the group's breakup. The record was to contain all of the band's 7” and compilation appearances, as well as some possible unreleased material and a remix. To date, this release has not materialized, and no further announcement has been made about the record.

== Discography ==
=== Albums ===
- Sharks Keep Moving (Status, 1999)
- Sharks Keep Moving (Vinyl LP - Redwood Records, 1999)

=== 7"s and EPs ===
- Sharks Keep Moving/The Kentucky Pistol Split 7-inch (Henry's Finest Recordings, 1998)
- Desert Strings and Drifters EP - (Second Nature Recordings, 1998)
- Pause and Clause EP - (Status, 2002)

=== Compilations ===
- "Westcott Bay, 1998" on Living Silent compilation - (Status)
- "Logger" on It Goes Without Saying compilation - (Sign Language Records)
- "Lime Green Café" on The Masculine Makeover compilation - Satellite City Records
- "Jet's Jets" on A Collection compilation - (Redwood Records, 2000)
