= Piranha 3DD (soundtrack) =

2012 soundtrack albums

Piranha 3DD (Original Motion Picture Soundtrack)

Soundtrack album by various artists
- Released: May 22, 2012
- Length: 57:27
- Label: Lakeshore
- Producer: Brian McNelis (exec.); Skip Williamson (exec.)

Piranha 3DD (Original Motion Picture Score)

Film score by Elia Cmíral
- Released: May 29, 2012
- Recorded: 2012
- Genre: Film score
- Length: 44:12
- Label: Lakeshore
- Producer: Elia Cmíral; Eric Craig; Richard Glasser

Elia Cmíral chronology
Rites of Passage (2012)	Piranha 3DD (2012)	Cam2Cam (2014)

Piranha 3DD (Original Motion Picture Soundtrack) is the soundtrack album to the 2012 film Piranha 3DD directed by John Gulager. The album featured 17 tracks which was released by Lakeshore Records on May 22, 2012. A second album, Piranha 3DD (Original Motion Picture Score) featuring an original score by Elia Cmíral was released on May 29, 2012.

== Background ==
The soundtrack featured 17 tracks, assembling a variety of genres such as pop, rap and hip hop and featuring artists include the Limousines, Bobot Adrenaline, Moros Eros, Jason Scheff, Amber Pacific, All the Right Moves amongst others. It was released through Lakeshore Records on May 22, 2012.

== Reception ==
Justin Richards of Blueprint stated that "Like so many compilation soundtrack albums Piranha 3DD tries hard to please too many kinds of people and therefore ends up not really pleasing anyone in particular. However, there's some reasonable stuff on this CD and it's worth a listen if you've the inclination." R. L. Shaffer of IGN described it a "pretty aggressive mix, loaded with heavy bass and sometimes overcooked surround elements". Reviewer based at Review Graveyard stated "If you're a major fan of the movie and loved the rather dull rock tracks then you'll love this - otherwise avoid."

== Track listing ==
No.	Title	Artist(s)	Length
1.	"Got Me in a Trance"	Marcus Latief Scott	2:41
2.	"Summer School"	Twirl	2:47
3.	"C'mon I Can't Wait"	Automatic Music Explosion	3:28
4.	"Chemical Kings"	The One & Only's	3:38
5.	"The Impatient, the Imperfect, the Impossible"	All the Right Moves	4:03
6.	"Open Ya Mind"	Sarah Khula	4:24
7.	"Very Busy People"	The Limousines	4:07
8.	"Before I Die"	ellphish	3:05
9.	"Flaskaboozendancingshoes"	The Limousines	3:18
10.	"Blast"	Bobot Adrenaline	2:52
11.	"Quit, You're Being Thoughtless"	Moros Eros	3:07
12.	"I'm Always Here"	Jason Scheff	3:24
13.	"Summertime"	Josh Mobley feat. Reina Williams	2:51
14.	"The Good Life"	Amber Pacific	3:41
15.	"Internet Killed the Video Star"	The Limousines	3:54
16.	"Head Banger"	Robert Etoll	1:14
17.	"Viktors Misery"	Bobot Adrenaline	4:53
Total length:			57:27

== Chart performance ==
Chart (2012)	Peak position
UK Soundtrack Albums (OCC)	45
US Top Soundtracks (Billboard)	19

== Accolades ==
Award	Category	Recipient(s)	Result	Ref.
Hollywood Music in Media Awards	Best Soundtrack Album	Piranha 3DD	Won	

== Original score ==
The original score is composed by Elia Cmíral who replaced Michael Wandmacher from the first film. The album was released through Lakeshore Records on May 29, 2012.

=== Reception ===
James Southall of Movie Wave wrote "There's enough to keep the album from being a dud – it's a shame that the action music doesn't have more bite (sorry) but there's still a decent amount of fun to have." Justin Richards of Blueprint called it a "decent action/horror score" which is "eminently re-listenable".

=== Track listing ===
No.	Title	Length
1.	"Return of the Piranhas"	3:04
2.	"Piranhas In The Pool"	1:50
3.	"Trident Aria"	1:41
4.	"Barry's Heroic Rescue"	4:04
5.	"Kiss of Life"	1:51
6.	"Eaten In Van"	2:22
7.	"Searching for the Cow"	3:16
8.	"Shelby and Josh"	1:45
9.	"Sheriff's Redemption"	1:56
10.	"Goodman's Laboratory"	5:06
11.	"Family Photo"	2:25
12.	"Struggle at the Pier"	2:44
13.	"Inspecting Lake"	2:17
14.	"Bathtub Dream"	1:43
15.	"Confronting Chet"	1:26
16.	"Depths of the Lake"	2:48
17.	"School of Piranhas"	1:03
18.	"Battle for the Water Park"	2:51
Total length:		44:12

=== Personnel ===
Credits adapted from liner notes:

- Composer and orchestrator – Elia Cmiral
- Producer – Elia Cmiral, Eric Craig, Richard Glasser
- Orchestra – KMC Orchestra
- Bass – Darby Oor
- Drums – Michael Mason
- Percussion, synth and sound designer – Elia Cmiral, John Samuel Hanson
- Vocals – John Samuel Hanson, Katy Novak, Melissa R. Kaplan
- Recording – Wolfgang Amadeus
- Mixing – Wolfgang Amadeus, Nick Baxter
- Executive producer – Brian McNelis, Skip Williamson
- Score coordinator – Eric Jasper
- Liner notes – Joel Soisson, John Gulager
- A&R director – Eric Craig
- Art direction – John Bergin
