= Kill Sadie =

American post-hardcore band

- Kill Sadie at a Seattle house show:(l-r) Jay, Erin, Bob

Background information
- Also known as: Killsadie
- Origin: Minneapolis, Minnesota, U.S.
- Genres: Emo, post-hardcore, indie rock, math rock, post-rock, experimental rock
- Years active: 1997–2001
- Labels: One Percent Records, THD Records, Old Glory Records, Modern Radio, Redwood Records, Satellite City, Dim Mak Records
- Past members: Erin Tate, J. Clark, Steve Snere, Patrick Scott, Cory Murchy, Andy Wolff, Rebecca Dunbar, Bruce J Wuollet, Bob Eisenbise, Josh VanLoon, Jason Aronen, Erik Hanson, Knol Tate

Kill Sadie (also Killsadie) was a Minneapolis-based post-hardcore band active from 1997 to 2001. The band adopted the DIY ethic of constant touring, rather than other forms of promotion. Several members of the band went on to perform with better known emo, hardcore, and indie bands including Minus the Bear, Pretty Girls Make Graves and These Arms Are Snakes.

== History ==
The band formed in 1997 in the Twin Cities area (Minneapolis/St. Paul) of Minnesota. They departed from their roots in the hardcore scene to experiment with adding sonic presence, electronic beats and sampling, as well as multi-layered vocals, and their sound ranged from soft ethereal jazz to screaming hardcore.

The band's name was taken from an incident at a party. Drummer Erin Tate was told by his brother Knol (guitarist) that a girl named "Sadie tried to kill [him]". Tate responded that "someone should kill Sadie". The band's name can be rendered as two words ("Kill Sadie") or combined into a single word.

The band eventually disbanded due to a relocation from Minneapolis to Seattle, as well as disagreements about the future direction of the band.

== Members ==
Killsadie's lineup changed several times due to touring and internal conflict.

- Erin Tate - drums (Spring 1997-Fall 2001) later of Onalaska/Askeleton/Minus the Bear
- J. Clark - guitar (Summer 1997-Fall 2001) later of Sharks Keep Moving, Pretty Girls Make Graves, Jaguar Love and KT 88
- Steve Snere - vocals (Spring 1999-Fall 2001) later of These Arms are Snakes/Crypts
- Patrick Scott - guitar/vocals (Fall 1999-Fall 2001) later of V.Reverse, My Lai, Locks, 97-Shiki and Unur
- Adam Juresko - Bass late 2000 to 2001, formally of City of Caterpillar
- Cory Murchy - bass (Winter 2001-Fall 2001) later of Minus the Bear and Onalaska
- Andy Wolff - roadie/honorary member (Spring 1997 - Spring 2000)
- Rebecca Dunbar - keyboard (Summer 2001-Fall 2001)
- Bruce J Wuollet - guitar (Spring 1999-Fall 1999) later of Themes, The Stereo, Animal Chin, KT 88 and End Transmission
- Bob Eisenbise - bass (Spring 1997-Fall 2000) later of Blackthorne, Chibalo, KT 88, and Shotgun Monday
- Josh VanLoon - vocals (January 1998-Winter 1998)
- Jason Aronen - vocals (Spring 1997-Fall 1997) later of The Real Enemy and Hope You Choke
- Erik Hanson - guitar (Spring 1997-Summer 1997) later of Flickr, The Stereo, Attention, and Amp 176
- Knol Tate - guitar (Spring 1997-Fall 1999) later of Askeleton, Hidden Chord and Deleter.

== Discography ==
- Traitor (album)|Traitor 7"/CD (One Percent Records, 1997)
- Kill Sadie (album)|Kill Sadie EP (THD Records, 1998)
- Half Cocked Concepts 10" (Old Glory Records, 1998)
- In Half Cocked Concepts CD (includes THD 7") (One Percent Records, 1999)
- Split 7" with Brand New Unit (Modern Radio, 2000)
- A New Make 7" (Redwood Records, 2000)
- Experiments in Expectation LP/CD (Dim Mak Records, 2001)
- We're All a Little Sick CD Remixes B-Sides (Satellite City, 2004)

== Promo pics ==
Erin Tate drums and Cory Murchy bass

Patrick Scott guitar

Erin Tate drums
