= Limousine (disambiguation) =

A limousine is a large, luxury, chauffeured motor vehicle.

Limousine may also refer to:

== Music ==
- "Limousine" (Hubert Kah song), 1986
- "Limousine" (Bring Me the Horizon song), 2024
- The Limousines, American electronica band

== Places ==
- Limosin, former administrative region of France, from which the vehicle takes its name

== See also ==
- Limousin (disambiguation)
