= The New Romance =

Studio album by Pretty Girls Make Graves
- Released: September 9, 2003
- Recorded: April 2002
- Studio: Bear Creek Studio
- Genres: Indie rock; post-punk revival; post-hardcore; math rock; emo
- Length: 39:41
- Label: Matador Records
- Producer: Phil Ek

Pretty Girls Make Graves chronology
Good Health (2002)	The New Romance (2003)	Élan Vital (2006)

The New Romance is the second studio album from Pretty Girls Make Graves, released on September 9, 2003 on the label Matador Records.

Professional ratings
Review scores
Source	Rating
AllMusic	4.5/5 stars
The A.V. Club	(favorable)
Drowned in Sound	9/10
Pitchfork	(8.3/10)
Rolling Stone	2/5 stars
Stylus Magazine	B−
Tiny Mix Tapes	3/5 marks

== Composition ==
Musically, The New Romance has been aligned with the post-punk revival, as well as emo, indie rock, post-hardcore, math rock, and punk rock.

== Critical reception and legacy ==
Professional ratings
Review scores
Source	Rating
Punknews.org	(2012)
Spectrum Culture	70% (2024)

Rocket-Fuel's Anna Giuliani considered the album "more complex, smarter and clearer" than the band's debut. Giuliani highlighted "Something Bigger, Something Brighter" and "Teeth Highlighter" as standouts and praised the title track, calling it "a perfectly dark pop song."

In recent years, Romance has been seen as an overlooked record in several genres. In a 2010 Drowned in Sound article, Robert Cooke glowingly wrote of its place in the post-punk & new wave revivals occurring at its time of release. He wrote that it predated the revivals' mid-2000s popularity, which groups like Bloc Party and Franz Ferdinand would receive. However, he believed that "near perfection [had] already been achieved" through Romance before either of their debut works came out. Though noting their significance, Cooke dubbed Romance "so bold, so beautiful, [and] so much better than its acclaimed successors". In 2012, Punknews.org's Joe Pelone wrote that, within post-hardcore, it wasn't held in the esteem that classic albums by At the Drive-In and Bear vs. Shark had. He deemed it "just as passionate [and] just as explosive" and that it "certainly deserves a spot" amongst them.

On a 2016 Pitchfork list, Romance placed #40 out of the Pacific Northwest's 50 best indie rock albums.

In celebration of its 20th anniversary, Matador Records reissued Romance for vinyl in November 2023. Spectrum Culture's Holly Hazelwood gave it a generally positive review the next year. She deemed it "the apex of [the group's] career," applauding it as "such a fantastic portrait of a band finding a harmonious balance between creativity and talent."

== Track listing ==
No.	Title	Length
1.	"Something Bigger, Something Brighter"	5:09
2.	"The Grandmother Wolf"	2:58
3.	"Mr. Club"	0:48
4.	"All Medicated Geniuses"	3:24
5.	"Blue Lights"	3:03
6.	"Chemical, Chemical"	2:39
7.	"7."	0:36
8.	"The Teeth Collector"	4:07
9.	"Holy Names"	3:57
10.	"The New Romance"	4:10
11.	"This Is Our Emergency"	3:43
12.	"A Certain Cemetery"	5:07

== Personnel ==
- Andrea Zollo – vocals
- Nick Dewitt – drums, samples, keyboards, vocals
- Derek Fudesco – bass guitar, vocals
- Nathan Thelen – guitar, vocals
- J. Clark – guitar, keyboards, samples
