= Jealous Me Was Killed by Curiosity =

Jealous Me Was Killed By Curiosity

Studio album by Moros Eros
- Released: October 16th, 2007
- Recorded: 2007
- Genre: Post-punk; Alternative rock
- Length: 38:08
- Label: Victory Records
- Producer: J. Clark

Moros Eros chronology
I Saw the Devil Last Night and Now the Sun Shines Bright (2006)	Jealous Me Was Killed By Curiosity (2007)

Professional ratings
Review scores
Source	Rating
AllMusic	3.5/5 stars
Absolutepunk.net	86%

Jealous Me Was Killed By Curiosity is the second and final studio album by Moros Eros. It was released on October 16, 2007 by Victory Records.

== Track listing ==
1. "Quit, You're Being Thoughtless" - 3:07
2. "On My Side" - 4:16
3. "Chokes" - 3:08
4. "Wake and Wait" - 4:54
5. "Safety Net" - 3:44
6. "Old Friend" - 4:58
7. "Lows and Highs" - 4:14
8. "Pride and Joy" - 3:14
9. "The View From Below" - 6:11

== Singles ==
- "Safety Net"
- "On My Side"
