= Hologram Jams =

Studio album by Jaguar Love
- Released: March 2, 2010
- Recorded: 2009
- Genre: Art punk, pop punk
- Length: 43:50
- Label: Fat Possum Records
- Producer: John Goodmanson

Jaguar Love chronology
Take Me to the Sea (2008)	Hologram Jams (2010)

Hologram Jams is the second full-length studio album by Jaguar Love. It is the first release not to feature former drummer J. Clark.

In May 2010, Jaguar Love and the website Tracks and Fields ran a remix competition for producers to remix the song "Polaroids and Red Wine," with the winner having their remix included on the single release.

== Critical reception ==
Professional ratings
Aggregate scores
Source	Rating
Album of the Year	42/100
AnyDecentMusic?	4.1/10
Metacritic	55/100
Review scores
Source	Rating
AllMusic	3/5 stars
Alternative Press	3/5 stars
Christgau's Consumer Guide	(3-star Honorable Mention)
Drowned in Sound	6/10
Loud and Quiet	2/10
NME	3.5/5 stars
Pitchfork	2/10
PopMatters	6/10 stars
The Skinny	1/5 stars
Tiny Mix Tapes	1.5/5 stars

Hologram Jams was poorly received by professional journalists, with most of the criticisms pointed at the group's stylistic changes towards what some journalists found to be a cheap electronic sound, an overly-sugary pop flavor, and a "target marketed" attempt to try to appeal to teenagers with its lyrics. The Line of Best Fit went as so far to compare Hologram Jams to 3OH!3, while reviewers from Pitchfork, Spectrum Culture, and The Skinny reported feeling exhausted from the album's overwhelming amount of noise and upbeat energy.

Whitney's vocal performance on Hologram Jams garnered a mixed response. Loud and Quiet criticized it for ranging "between white boy skit and whiny primetime talent show hopeful" instead of sounding like a "banshee call for something belligerent" in his past works. AllMusic suggested the synthesizers exaggerated Whitney's "dazzlingly shrill singing style and flare for dramatics" that turned off some reviewers of prior Jaguar Love releases. On the other hand, Drowned in Sound called the singing a "saving grace" in an album with machine-programmed instrumentals where "songs are stuck on a loop."

Hologram Jams's more decent reviews appreciated it as a fun dance record, NME's Kelly Murray particularly enjoying it as a satirical one. The change towards a more electronic sound was also positively commented on by a few reviewers, including Erin Lyndal Martin of PopMatters, who claimed it still had "the sheer energy the music puts forth and the exuberant elastics of Johnny Whitney’s vocals" while keeping it "fresh" with the use of synthesizers.

== Track listing ==
1. I Started A Fire - 3:56
2. Polaroids And Red Wine - 3:39
3. Cherry Soda - 3:17
4. Don't Die Alone - 3:34
5. Up All Night - 4:11
6. Jaguar Warriors - 3:04
7. Everything Is Awesome - 3:57
8. Evaline - 4:01
9. Sad Parade - 3:31
10. A Prostitute, An Angel - 3:38
11. Freak Out - 3:55
12. Piece of My Heart (Erma Franklin cover) - 3:14
