= Suicide Medicine =

Studio album by Rocky Votolato
- Released: September 2003
- Recorded: January 2003
- Genre: Folk-Rock
- Length: 47:56
- Label: Second Nature Recordings
- Producer: Rocky Votolato

Rocky Votolato chronology
Burning My Travels Clean (2001)	Suicide Medicine (2003)	Makers (2006)

Professional ratings
Review scores
Source	Rating
Allmusic	4/5 stars

Suicide Medicine is an album by Rocky Votolato. It was released on September 16, 2003, by the independent label Second Nature Recordings. Votolato’s third studio effort is described by some critics as a darker, more brooding album than his 2001 release, Burning My Travels Clean.

== Track listing ==
1. "The Light And The Sound" – 4:03
2. "Suicide Medicine" – 2:55
3. "I'll Catch You" – 4:11
4. "Automatic Rifle" – 4:39
5. "Every Red Cent" – 3:36
6. "Montana" – 3:59
7. "Alabaster" – 3:21
8. "The City Is Calling" – 3:49
9. "The Secrets Of A Salesman" – 4:16
10. "Prison Is Private Property (A Life of Your Own)" – 4:29
11. "Death-Right" – 4:16
12. "Mix Tapes / Cellmates" – 4:26
