= The Brag and Cuss =

Studio album by Rocky Votolato
- Released: June 19, 2007
- Genre: Indie/Singer songwriter
- Label: Barsuk Records
- Producer: Casey Foubert; Rocky Votolato

Rocky Votolato chronology
End Like This (2007)	The Brag and Cuss (2007)	True Devotion (2009)

Professional ratings
Review scores
Source	Rating
Relevant Magazine	(not rated) link
The Wheel's Still in Spin	(not rated)link

The Brag and Cuss is the 2007 release from Seattle singer-songwriter Rocky Votolato. It is his second album on Barsuk Records after 2006's Makers.

The album received a rating of five from PopMatters.

== Track listing ==
No.	Title	Length
1.	"Lilly White"	3:41
2.	"Postcard From Kentucky"	2:56
3.	"Before You Were Born"	3:31
4.	"The Wrong Side of Reno"	3:33
5.	"Red Dragon Wishes"	3:10
6.	"The Blue Rose"	2:47
7.	"Your Darkest Eyes"	4:02
8.	"Time Is a Debt"	2:41
9.	"Whiskey Straight"	3:31
10.	"This Old Holland"	4:08
11.	"Silver Trees"	3:29
Total length:		40:29

All lyrics and music by Rocky Votolato, except: "Before You Were Born" – Casey Foubert, Rocky Votolato, April Votolato; "Red Dragon Wishes" and "The Blue Rose" – Rocky Votolato, April Votolato; "The Old Holland" – Rocky Votolato, Michael Aaron Dooley.
