= Rocky Votolato (album) =

Studio album by Rocky Votolato
- Released: August 31, 1999
- Genre: Indie/Singer songwriter
- Label: Original Release: Status Recordings; Re-Release: Second Nature Recordings

Rocky Votolato chronology
Rocky Votolato (1999)	Rocky Votolato/Seth Warren 7" (1999)

Professional ratings
Review scores
Source	Rating
Allmusic	Not rated link

Rocky Votolato is the 1999 debut release from Seattle singer-songwriter Rocky Votolato. Originally released in 1999, these songs were recorded in a basement with two microphones over a 4-hour period. Although written between 1996 and 1997, it wasn't until 2008 that the album became accessible, when it was re-released by Second Nature.

== Track listing ==
1. "I'd Be Fine" – 1:29
2. "Treepeople" – 2:24
3. "Intro To ACGF" – 1:49
4. "Cut Me in Two" – 2:18
5. "Victims" – 3:25
6. "Blood in Your Eyes" – 3:54
7. "A Painting of a Song" – 2:47
8. "The Bed Is Warm" – 3:37
9. "People To Impress" – 3:02
10. "Work Hard" – 1:36
11. "Coast Lines To Follow" – 2:36
12. "I Remember Music" – 4:42
