= Jaguar Love (EP) =

Jaguar Love EP

EP by Jaguar Love
- Released: June 3, 2008
- Recorded: 2008
- Genres: Art punk, experimental rock, post-punk
- Length: 13:40
- Label: Matador Records
- Producer: J. Clark

Jaguar Love chronology
Jaguar Love EP (2008)	Take Me to the Sea (2008)

Jaguar Love EP is the first release by art punk band Jaguar Love. It was released by Matador Records on June 3, 2008 in CD, mp3, and FLAC formats.

== Critical reception ==
Writing for MSN Music, Robert Christgau gave Jaguar Love an "A−" and preferred it to the band's debut album Take Me to the Sea (2008).

== Track listing ==
1. "Highways of Gold" - 3:41
2. "My Organ Sounds Like...." - 5:09
3. "Videotape Seascape" - 4:50

== Personnel ==
- Produced, engineered and mixed by J. Clark at Two Sticks Audio.
- Drums engineered by John Goodmanson.
- Layout by Johnny Whitney/Crystal City Clothing.
