= True Devotion (album) =

Studio album by Rocky Votolato
- Released: February 23, 2010
- Genre: Folk, acoustic
- Label: Barsuk

Rocky Votolato chronology
The Brag and Cuss (2007)	True Devotion (2010)	Television of Saints (2012)

True Devotion is Rocky Votolato's sixth full-length studio album, and third release from Barsuk Records.

== Track listing ==
1. Lucky Clover Coin
2. Fragments
3. Red River
4. Eyes Like Static
5. Sparklers
6. Instruments
7. What Waited For Me
8. Sun Devil
9. Don't Be Angry
10. Where We Started
