= Moros Eros =

American alternative rock band

- Origin: Marietta, Georgia
- Genres: Indie rock, Alternative rock
- Years active: 2005–2008
- Label: Victory Records
- Members: Zach Tipton; DJ Shulz; Chris Firebaugh; Bobby Theberge

Moros Eros was an American alternative rock band from Marietta, Georgia. The band formed under the name In Vitro and released their debut EP, I'm Dying But I Still Don't See Anything, under that name, only to discover the name was already trademarked by a French band. The band renamed themselves Moros Eros (Moros is Greek for "impending doom" and Eros is the Greek god of love). The band signed to Victory Records. The band's debut album, I Saw the Devil Last Night and Now the Sun Shines Bright, was released on October 31, 2006, with the single "Today Is The Day" soon following. The band played at the 2007 South by Southwest. The group's most recent album, Jealous Me Was Killed By Curiosity, arrived in October 2007.

According to AbsolutePunk.net on April 7, 2008, they had broken up.

== After the breakup ==
On Moros Eros' Myspace page, they have posted that they have moved on and started their musical life in something new. Zach Tipton has started two bands: Young Coyotes and I am the Dot. Chris Firebaugh has joined a band named The Peppermint Confederacy. Bobby Theberge and Derek Schulz are recording and performing psychedelic doom metal under the name Day Old Man.

== Line-up ==
- Zach Tipton: Lead vocals, Guitar, Lyrics
- DJ Schulz: Bass
- Chris Firebaugh: Keyboards, Guitar
- Bobby Theberge: Drums

== Discography ==
- I'm Dying But I Still Don't See Anything EP (2006)
- I Saw the Devil Last Night and Now the Sun Shines Bright (Victory Records, 2006) – Produced by John Naclerio
- Jealous Me Was Killed By Curiosity (Victory Records, 2007) – Produced by J. Clark

== Singles ==
- "Today Is The Day" (2006)
- "On My Side" (2007)
- "Safety Net" (2007)
