= Hush (The Limousines album) =

Studio album by The Limousines
- Released: June 11, 2013
- Length: 48:56
- Label: Self-released
- Producer: Eric Victorino/Giovanni Giusti

The Limousines chronology
Get Sharp (2010)	Hush (2013)

Hush is the second album by electro-pop group The Limousines.

== Track listing ==
No.	Title	Length
1.	"Love Is A Dog From Hell"	4:00
2.	"Strangers"	2:59
3.	"Bedbugs"	4:43
4.	"Fool's Gold"	4:17
5.	"Haunted"	3:39
6.	"Little Space"	2:38
7.	"Undercover"	3:30
8.	"Wrecking Ball"	3:00
9.	"Scream Please"	3:31
10.	"GRB 09042"	4:17
11.	"The Last Dance"	4:18
12.	"Gimme Control"	4:08
13.	"Hush"	3:31
