= Engel 07 =

Single by Hubert Kah

from the album Golden Zeiten
- Released: April 1984 ("Engel 07"); June 1985 ("Angel 07")
- Length: 3:43
- Label: Blow Up (1984 release); Curb; MCA
- Songwriters: Hubert Kemmler; Mario Killer; Timothy Touchton (English lyrics)
- Producers: Michael Cretu; Armand Volker

Hubert Kah singles chronology
| "Einmal nur mit Erika" (1983) | "Engel 07" (1984) | "Wenn der Mond die Sonne berührt" (1984) |

Hubert Kah singles chronology
| "Goldene Zeiten" (1985) | "Angel 07" (1985) | "Limousine" (1986) |

"Engel 07" (released as "Angel 07" in English) is a song by German synthpop band Hubert Kah, which was released in 1984 as the lead single from the band's second studio album Golden Zeiten. "Engel 07" was written by Hubert Kemmler (music) and Mario Killer (lyrics), and produced by Michael Cretu and Armand Volker. The song reached No. 30 on the German Singles Chart.

A re-recorded English language version of the song, "Angel 07", was released as a single in 1985. The English lyrics were written by Timothy Touchton. In the US, "Angel 07" was released from the soundtrack of the 1985 American comedy action film Gotcha!.

In 1986, a Japanese version of the song was recorded by Megumi Shiina as "Change Me!" The Japanese lyrics were written by Hiromi Mori.

== Promotion ==
On German TV, the band performed the song on Na sowas! on 9 May 1984, Der Spielbude on 9 August 1984, and ZDF-Hitparade on 17 January 1985. A music video was filmed to promote the English version of the song. It was directed by Pete Cornish. The video would debut on MTV in June 1985.

== Critical reception ==
Upon its release, Cash Box listed the single as one of their "feature picks" during June 1985. They commented: "Hubert Kah scores with a sheen-pop outing reminiscent of fellow German, Peter Schilling. A good international feel, a perfect record for summertime CHR."

== Track listing ==
=== 1984 release ===
7" single

1. "Engel 07" - 3:43
2. "Rhythmus À Gogo" - 3:20

12" single

1. "Engel 07" - 5:07
2. "Rhythmus À Gogo" - 3:20

=== 1985 release ===
7" single (Italian release)

1. "Angel 07" (Edited Version) - 3:54
2. "Solo Tu" - 3:42

7" single (Australian release)

1. "Angel 07" (Edited Version) - 3:54
2. "Engel 07" (German Version) - 4:02

7" single (Japanese release)

1. "Angel 07" (Edited Version) - 3:54
2. "Angel 07" (Extended Version) - 6:10

12" single (US release)

1. "Angel 07" (Extended Version) - 6:10
2. "Angel 07" (Edited Version) - 3:54
3. "Angel 07" (Rock Remix) - 4:18
4. "Angel 07" (Alternative Remix) - 6:54

12" single (Australian release)

1. "Angel 07" (Extended Version) - 6:10
2. "Angel 07" (Edited) - 3:54
3. "Engel 07" (German Version) - 4:02
4. "Angel 07" (Alternative Remix) - 6:54

== Personnel ==
Hubert Kah

- Hubert Kemmler – vocals, keyboards
- Markus Löhr – guitar, keyboards
- Klaus Hirschburger – bass

Production

- Michael Cretu – producer, arranger
- Armand Volker – producer
- David Leonard – remixer and engineer on "Rock Remix"
- Victor Flores – remixer on "Alternative Remix"
- David Storrs – remix engineer on "Alternative Remix"

Other

- Mike Schmidt at Ink Studios – cover (1984 release)
- Sheila Rock – photography (1984 release)

== Charts ==
| Chart (1984) | Peak position |
|---|---|
| European Hot 100 Singles | 94 |
| German Singles Chart | 30 |
| Swiss Singles Chart | 15 |
