= Élan Vital (album) =

Studio album by Pretty Girls Make Graves
- Released: April 11, 2006
- Recorded: 2005
- Genres: Emo; math rock; punk rock
- Length: 42:03
- Label: Matador Records
- Producer: Colin Stewart

Pretty Girls Make Graves chronology
The New Romance (2003)	Élan Vital (2006)

Élan Vital is the third studio album by Pretty Girls Make Graves. The album was released on April 11, 2006. It is the first album with new keyboardist Leona Marrs.

The title is based on the philosophical idea, élan vital.

Professional ratings
Review scores
Source	Rating
AbsolutePunk.net	(85%) link
AllMusic	link
Alternative Press	5/5
Now	4/5 Ns
Pitchfork	6.4/10
Paste	(favorable)

== Composition ==
Pitchfork saw Élan Vital continue the group's "angular, studio-polished" fusion of emo, math rock and punk.

== Track listing ==
1. "The Nocturnal House" – 4:04
2. "Pyrite Pedestal" – 3:26
3. "The Number" – 3:09
4. "Parade" – 2:40
5. "Domino" – 3:38
6. "Interlude" – 1:18
7. "The Magic Hour" – 3:16
8. "Selling the Wind" – 3:54
9. "Pearls on a Plate" – 3:46
10. "Pictures of a Night Scene" – 2:52
11. "Wildcat" – 3:11
12. "Bullet Charm" – 6:43

== Personnel ==
- Andrea Zollo – vocals
- Nick Dewitt – drums, samples, vocals, trumpet, piano
- Derek Fudesco – bass guitar, vocals
- J. Clark – guitar, drums, keyboard, saxophone, trumpet, vocals, programming
- Leona Marrs – keyboards, accordion, piano, melodica, vocals
