= Terrorhawk =

Studio album by Bear vs. Shark
- Released: June 14, 2005
- Recorded: December 27, 2004-February 3, 2005
- Studio: Mad Oak, Boston, Massachusetts; Q Division, Somerville, Massachusetts
- Genre: Post-hardcore; emo; indie rock
- Length: 44:01
- Label: Equal Vision
- Producer: Matthew Ellard

Bear vs. Shark chronology
Right Now You're in the Best of Hands... (2003)	Terrorhawk (2005)

Professional ratings
Review scores
Source	Rating
AbsolutePunk.net	85%
AllMusic	4.5/5 stars
Alternative Press	5/5 stars
Pitchfork	7.7/10

Terrorhawk is the second and final album by the post-hardcore band Bear vs. Shark, released in 2005 by Equal Vision Records. The Clash, Black Sabbath, and Hüsker Dü were all cited by the group as influences on the album. It was written in a cabin in the Upper Peninsula of Michigan from September 2004 to November and was recorded from late December 2004 to February 2005.

A video for "Catamaran" was released in February 2006, composed of clips taken from a number of live performances in August and September 2005.

== Track listing ==
All tracks are written by Bear vs. Shark, except where noted.

No.	Title	Writer(s)	Length
1.	"Catamaran"	Bear vs. Shark, Brandon Moss	2:55
2.	"5, 6 Kids"		3:49
3.	"Six Bar Phrase Hey Hey"		0:28
4.	"The Great Dinosaurs with Fifties Section"		3:13
5.	"Baraga Embankment"		3:13
6.	"Entrance of the Elected"		3:07
7.	"Seven Stop Hold Restart"		2:43
8.	"What a Horrible Night for a Cause"		3:51
9.	"Out Loud Hey Hey"		1:38
10.	"India Foot"		0:25
11.	"Antwan"		2:45
12.	"I Fucked Your Dad"		3:31
13.	"Heard Iron Bug, 'They're Coming to Town'"		2:39
14.	"Song About Old Roller Coaster"	Bear vs. Shark, Moss	6:02
15.	"Rich People Say Fuck Yeah Hey Hey"		3:45
Total length:			44:01

2016 remastered vinyl bonus track
No.	Title	Length
16.	"Start Small, Great Destroyer"	5:07

== Personnel ==
Bear vs. Shark

- Marc Paffi – lead vocals, guitar, keyboards, album artwork
- Derek Kiesgen – guitar, bass guitar
- Mike Muldoon – guitar, bass guitar, keyboards
- John Gaviglio – guitar, bass guitar, backing vocals
- Ashley Horak – drums

Additional

- Dana Colley – baritone saxophone (track 5)
- Roger Lussier – baritone saxophone (track 5)
- Sara Honeywell – trombone (track 5)
- John Ebrecht – trumpet (track 5)
- Matthew Dear – additional programming
- Matthew Ellard – producer, mixing, engineer
- Kris Smith – assistant engineer
- Jason Mareydt – additional artwork
- Bill Scoville – layout
