= I Saw the Devil Last Night and Now the Sun Shines Bright =

Studio album by Moros Eros
- Released: October 31, 2006
- Genre: Indie rock
- Label: Victory Records

Moros Eros chronology
I'm Dying But I Still Don't See Anything (2006)	I Saw the Devil Last Night and Now the Sun Shines Bright (2006)	Jealous Me Was Killed By Curiosity (2007)

I Saw the Devil Last Night and Now the Sun Shines Bright is the first studio album from Moros Eros, released on Victory Records in 2006.

== Track listing ==
1. "Today is the Day" – 4:00
2. "When I Wake" – 3:23
3. "Short of the Shore" – 3:05
4. "I Saw The Devil Last Night" – 4:09
5. "And Now The Sun Shines Bright" – 3:29
6. "Insane and Speechless" – 3:12
7. "I Will Come Back Again" – 3:41
8. "Make Me an Angel" – 3:08
9. "Madness Seems So Normal" – 6:03
10. "Satan Has a Heart of Gold" – 2:32

== Singles ==
- "Today is the Day"
