= Take Me to the Sea =

Studio album by Jaguar Love
- Released: August 19, 2008
- Recorded: 2008
- Genre: Art punk
- Length: 42:26
- Label: Matador Records
- Producer: J. Clark

Jaguar Love chronology
| Jaguar Love EP (2008) | Take Me to the Sea (2008) | Hologram Jams (2010) |

Professional ratings
Review scores
| Source | Rating |
|---|---|
| AbsolutePunk | 89% link |
| Allmusic | link |
| Gigwise.com | link |
| NME | 7/10 link |
| Pitchfork Media | 6.8/10 link |
| Rockmidgets.com | link |
| The Skinny | link |
| Sputnikmusic | link |
| World of Music | 3.5/5 stars |

Take Me to the Sea is the first full-length release from Jaguar Love. It was released on August 19, 2008, by Matador Records. The album leaked onto the internet on July 15, 2008. It was their last album to feature drummer J. Clark.

== Track listing ==
1. Highways of Gold - 3:39
2. Bats over the Pacific Ocean - 3:44
3. Jaguar Pirates - 4:31
4. Georgia - 5:56
5. Vagabond Ballroom - 3:51
6. Humans Evolve into Skyscrapers - 3:50
7. Antoine and Birdskull - 3:43
8. Bone Trees and a Broken Heart - 3:38
9. The Man with the Plastic Suns - 4:31
10. My Organ Sounds Like... - 5:09

== Trivia ==
- Songs 1, 4, 7, and 9 all appeared on the Jaguar Love demos, released in August 2007.
- "Antoine and Birdskull" was originally titled "Welcome to the Birdskull Palace" and "Georgia" was titled "Georgia, Take Me to the Sea".
