= Limousin (disambiguation) =

Limousin can refer to:

- Limousin (administrative region), a former administrative region in southwest-central France
- Limousin (province), former province of France under the Ancien Régime
- Limousin dialect, a dialect of the Occitan language
- Limousin cattle, a breed of beef cattle originating from the Limousin

== See also ==
- Limousine, a chauffeured vehicle
- Limousine (disambiguation)
- Canton of La Région Limouxine, in the Aude department, southern France
  - Limoux, town from which La Région Limouxine takes its name
