= Scrapbook (The Limousines EP) =

EP by The Limousines
- Released: November 2009
- Genre: Electropop
- Length: 18:14
- Label: MAKEYOUSICK
- Producer: Eric Victorino/Giovanni Giusti

The Limousines chronology
Scrapbook (2009)	Get Sharp (2010)

Scrapbook is an EP and the first physical release by electropop band The Limousines, It was released in late 2009 on dual 7″ white vinyl gatefold with a passcode for an MP3 download. It was limited pressing of 500 hand numbered copies, the first 50 people who ordered were also sent polaroid photographs shot by the band and all pre-orders were signed by the band. The EP was released digitally worldwide through iTunes Store, Amazon and Lala.com It's the first music release by Eric Victorino's company Orchard City Books & Noise and the first release under the imprint MAKEYOUSICK, based in the Bay Area. In January 2012, Scrapbook was re-released in CD format and featured two bonus tracks: "To Be Adored," previously released in 2010 as a promotional single to their debut album Get Sharp, and "Short'n Sweet".

== Track listings ==
=== Original LP ===
No.	Title	Length
1.	"Scrapbook 1998"	2:58
2.	"Plans Are Just Coincidence"	4:16
3.	"New Year's Resolution"	5:37
4.	"ithinkican"	5:23
Total length:		18:14

=== 2012 CD re-release ===
No.	Title	Length
1.	"Scrapbook (1998)"	3:00
2.	"New Year's Resolution"	5:39
3.	"Plans Are Just Coincidence"	4:18
4.	"I Think I Can"	5:24
5.	"To Be Adored"	3:13
6.	"Short'n Sweet"	0:53
Total length:		22:27
