= Good Health =

Studio album by Pretty Girls Make Graves
- Released: April 9, 2002
- Recorded: December 2001
- Studio: Robert Lang (Shoreline, Washington)
- Genres: Indie rock; emo; post-hardcore; punk rock
- Length: 27:37
- Label: Lookout Records
- Producers: Phil Ek and Pretty Girls Make Graves

Pretty Girls Make Graves chronology
Pretty Girls Make Graves (2001)	Good Health (2002)	The New Romance (2003)

Professional ratings
Review scores
Source	Rating
AllMusic	4/5 stars
The Guardian	3/5 stars
Pitchfork	9.2/10
The Village Voice	A−

Good Health is the first studio album by Pretty Girls Make Graves. Originally released in 2002 by Lookout Records, it was re-released by Matador Records with an additional 4 songs made up of the band's first self-titled EP.

== Composition ==
Musically, Good Health has been aligned with punk, indie rock, emo, and "twitchy" post-hardcore akin to The Nation of Ulysses.

== Critical reception and legacy ==
Ink 19 described Good Health as "[a] rather fine collection of energetic, angular emo" and noted that "[the] album flows over with hooks and ideas, twists and turns, with ingenious musicianship and a vivid presence". In a 20th anniversary review, Stereogum's Tom Breihan dubbed Health "28 delirious minutes [that are] enough to leave you breathless and stirred." He positively called its sound "fast and urgent and adrenaline-charged", as well as "rich and dynamic." In a 2022 retrospective list by BrooklynVegan, it placed #33 out of 35 of 2002's best emo & post-hardcore albums. The site's Andrew Sacher wrote that the group "came out of the gate swinging" on the record and that, 20 years on, its tracks "still pack a refreshing punch."

== Track listing ==
No.	Title	Length
1.	"Speakers Push the Air"	2:50
2.	"If You Hate Your Friends, You're Not Alone"	2:40
3.	"Sad Girls Por Vida"	3:26
4.	"The Get Away"	4:15
5.	"untitled"	1:05
6.	"More Sweet Soul"	3:14
7.	"Ghosts in the Radio"	3:00
8.	"Bring It On Golden Pond"	2:56
9.	"By the Throat"	4:05

Rerelease bonus tracks (Pretty Girls Make Graves EP)
No.	Title	Length
10.	"3 Away"	2:45
11.	"Modern Day Emma Goldman"	2:49
12.	"Liquid Courage"	3:26
13.	"Head South"	3:12

== Personnel ==
- Andrea Zollo – Vocals
- Nick Dewitt – Drums, Vocals, Samples, Keyboards
- Derek Fudesco – Bass, Vocals
- J. Clark – Guitar, Vocals, Programming, Keyboards
- Nathan Thelen – Guitar, Vocals
