= Rocky Votolato =

American singer-songwriter (born 1977)

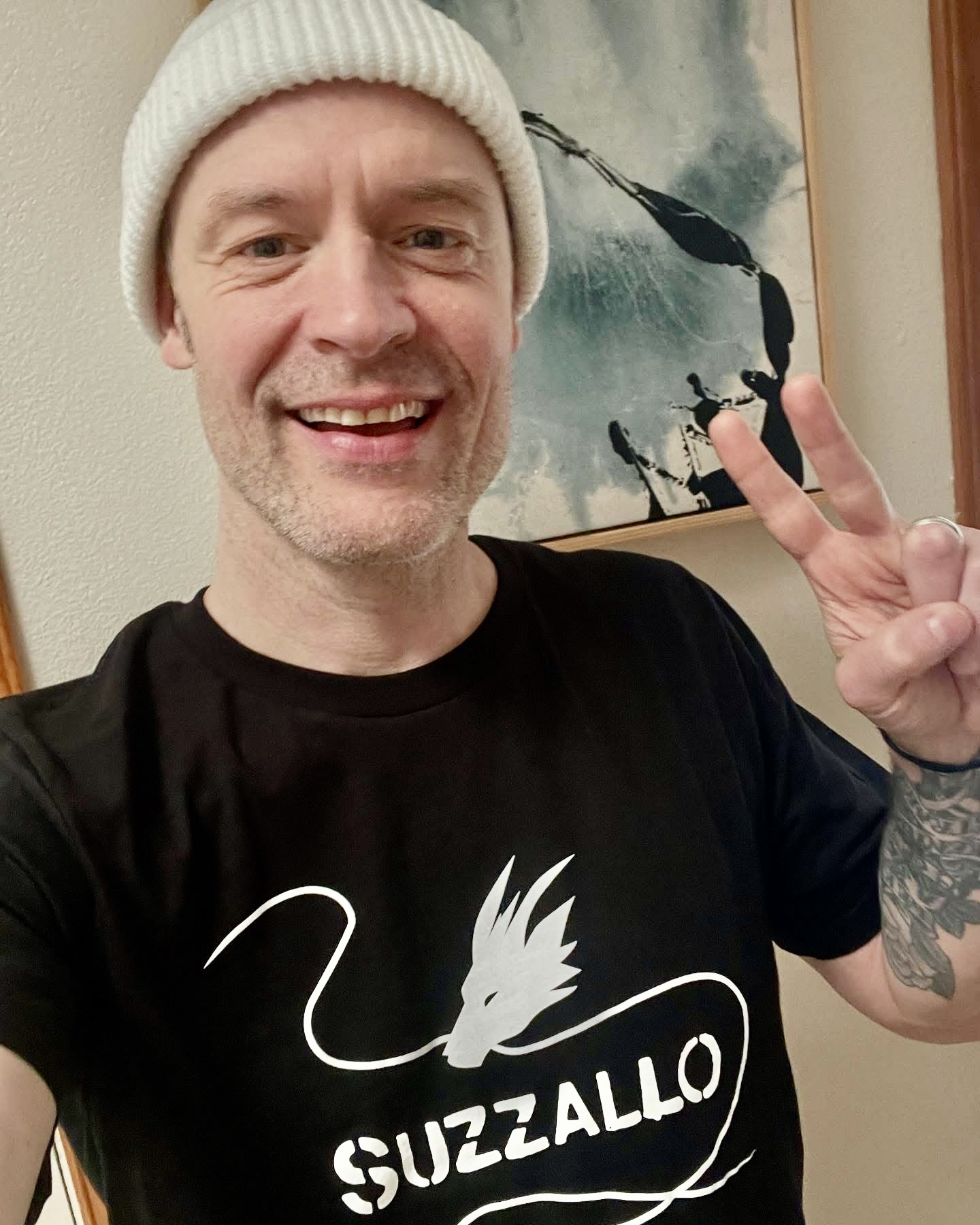

Background information
- Born: March 8, 1977 (age 49); Dallas, Texas, U.S.
- Origin: Seattle, Washington, U.S.
- Genres: Folk, alt-country, indie rock, Alternative rock
- Occupation: Singer-songwriter
- Instruments: Guitar, vocals
- Years active: 1995–present
- Labels: No Sleep Records; Barsuk; Second Nature; Status Recordings
- Member of: Waxwing (band); Lying on Loot; Suzzallo
- Website: http://www.rockyvotolato.com

Rocky Votolato (born March 8, 1977) is an American indie and folk singer-songwriter. He was also a member of the rock group Waxwing. in 2025, he started a new band called Suzzallo with bandmate Rudy Gajadhar on drums and former Schoolyard Heroes guitarist Steve Bonnell playing bass. Votolato currently lives in Seattle, Washington.

== Biography ==
Rocky Votolato was formerly the singer of a punk quartet Waxwing in the 90s before leaving in 1999 to pursue a solo career. He released several albums between 1999 and 2008. In 2015, he released the record Hospital Handshakes with Death Cab For Cutie member Chris Walla. After 2015, he went on a hiatus until 2022 when he released the album Wild Roots. Every song on Wild Roots is based on one of his family members.

He has been married to his wife, April Votolato, for over 10 years, and they live in Seattle. Their child Kienan died at age 22 in a car accident in December 2021.

In 2022, Rocky Votolato played two sold-out shows in Denver, Colorado.

in 2025, his new band Suzzallo released a debut album “The Quiet Year” as a means of coping with the death of his child.

== Discography ==
=== Solo ===
- Rocky Votolato (1999) (Status Recordings)
- Rocky V/Seth Warren 7" (1999) (Redwood Records)
- A Brief History (2000) (Your Best Guess)
- Rocky V/Suffering & The Thieves 7" (2002) (Velvet Blue Music)
- Burning My Travels Clean (LP) (2002) (Second Nature Recordings)
- The Light and the Sound (EP) (2003) (Second Nature Recordings)
- Suicide Medicine (2003) (Second Nature Recordings)
- Makers (2006) (Second Nature Recordings) (Barsuk)
- End Like This (EP) (2007) (Second Nature Recordings)
- The Brag and Cuss (2007) (Barsuk)
- True Devotion (2010) (Barsuk)
- Television of Saints (2012) (Undertow Music Collective)
- Hospital Handshakes (2015) (No Sleep Records)
- Live at Black Belt (2017) (Rocket Heart Records)
- Wild Roots (2022) (Spartan Records)

=== Waxwing ===
- Waxwing 7" (1999) (Henry's Finest Recordings)
- For Madmen Only (1999) (Second Nature Recordings)
- One for the Ride (2000) (Second Nature Recordings)
- Intervention:Collection+Remix (2001) (Second Nature Recordings)
- Nobody Can Take What Everybody Owns (2002) (Second Nature Recordings)

=== Lying On Loot ===
- Split 7" with State Route 522 (1996) (Henry's Finest Recordings)

=== Suzzallo ===
- The Quiet Year (2025)
