= Get Sharp =

Studio album by The Limousines
- Released: July 27, 2010; April 2011 (reissue)
- Genre: Electropop
- Length: 41:03
- Label: Orchard City Books and Noise, Dangerbird
- Producer: Eric Victorino/Giovanni Giusti

The Limousines chronology
Scrapbook (2009)	Get Sharp (2010)	Hush (2013)

Professional ratings
Review scores
Source	Rating
AllMusic	3.5/5 stars

Get Sharp is the debut album by electropop group The Limousines. It was released on July 27, 2010, through iTunes and Hot Topic on indie label Orchard City Books and Noise. The album features the songs "Very Busy People" and "Internet Killed the Video Star", the latter being an allusion to the Buggles hit "Video Killed the Radio Star."

== Track listing ==
No.	Title	Length
1.	"Square Circle Triangle"	0:49
2.	"Dancing at Her Funeral"	3:43
3.	"Internet Killed the Video Star"	3:53
4.	"Very Busy People"	4:06
5.	"Flaskaboozendancingshoes"	3:18
6.	"The Future"	4:29
7.	"Triangle Circle Square"	2:36
8.	"Wildfires"	5:26
9.	"Swrdswllngwhr (Wishing Well)"	5:03
10.	"Fine Art"	4:46
11.	"Get Sharp"	2:50

=== 2011 re-issue ===
No.	Title	Length
1.	"Square Circle Triangle"	0:49
2.	"Dancing At Her Funeral"	3:43
3.	"Internet Killed The Video Star"	3:53
4.	"Very Busy People"	4:06
5.	"Flaskaboozendancingshoes"	3:18
6.	"The Future"	4:29
7.	"Wildfires"	5:26
8.	"Swrdswllngwhr (Wishing Well)"	5:03
9.	"Fine Art"	4:46
10.	"Get Sharp"	2:50
11.	"Internet Killed The Video Star (Nicky Chuck Remix) Bonus Track"	3:39
12.	"Very Busy People (Nicky Chuck Remix) Bonus Track"	4:05
