= Limousine (Hubert Kah song) =

Single by Hubert Kah

from the album Tensongs
- Released: April 1986
- Length: 3:41
- Label: Curb; MCA; Blow Up
- Songwriters: Hubert Kemmler; Markus Löhr; Susanne Müller-Pi; Klaus Hirschburger
- Producers: Michael Cretu; Armand Volker

Hubert Kah singles chronology
| "Angel 07" (1985) | "Limousine" (1986) | "Something I Should Know" (1986) |

"Limousine" is a song by German synthpop band Hubert Kah, released in April 1986 as the lead single from their fourth studio album, Tensongs. The song was written by Hubert Kemmler, Markus Löhr, Susanne Müller-Pi and Klaus Hirschburger, and produced by Michael Cretu and Armand Volker.

== Background ==
Following the release of their third studio album Goldene Zeiten in 1984, Hubert Kah began writing and recording their first English studio album Tensongs. As recording neared completion, the band felt the album lacked any potential singles, prompting them to write "Limousine". The song was written in approximately 20 minutes at Löhr's apartment in Frankfurt.

Hirschburger recalled to James Arena in 2017: ""Limousine" was done very spontaneously. Hubert and I had an idea about a limousine. It worked, and we incorporated a classical approach in the melody." In a 1986 for Japanese TV, Hirschburger described "Limousine" as being "about a man who is real paranoid and is always chased by a dream".

The song achieved success in Europe, reaching No. 8 in Germany and No. 25 in Switzerland. It was the band's last Top 30 hit in Germany.

== Promotion ==
For German TV, Hubert Kah also performed the song on P. I. T. – Peter-Illmann-Treff on 14 May, Formel Eins on 20 May, WWF Club on 13 June, and Peter's Pop Show on 6 December.

== Critical reception ==
Upon its release, Music & Media described "Limousine" as Hubert Kah's "most commercial effort as of yet". They added: "Accessible and danceable pop disco plus a catchy chorus effectively backed by a female choir." Billboard described the song as "Eurosynth atmospherics in a Talk Talk/Roxy Music vein". Bob Eborall of the Ealing Leader described the song as a "potent single". David Quantick of New Musical Express described "Limousine" as a "completely commonplace single" and concluded that "Hubert's wheels are definitely not on fire".

== Track listing ==
7" single

1. "Limousine" - 3:41
2. "Drowning" - 3:45

12" single (European release)

1. "Limousine" (Extended Version) - 5:40
2. "Drowning" - 3:45

12" single (UK release)

1. "Limousine" (American Remix) - 7:10
2. "Limousine" (Extended Version) - 5:40
3. "Drowning" - 3:45

12" single (German release)

1. "Limousine" (American Edit) - 5:13
2. "Drowning" - 3:45
3. "The Picture" - 3:24

12" single (Japanese release)

1. "Limousine" (American Remix Version) - 5:13
2. "Drowning" - 3:45

12" single (US promo)

1. "Limousine" (American Re-mix) - 7:10
2. "Limousine" (Extended Version - European) - 5:40
3. "Drowning" - 3:45

Expanded" single (Worldwide promo)

1. "Limousine" - 4:03
2. "Limousine" (Edit) - 3:41
3. "Limousine" (Extended Version - European) - 5:40
4. "Limousine" (American Edit) - 5:13
5. "Limousine" (American Re-mix) - 7:10
6. "Drowning" - 3:45

American Edit" single (USA 2nd, promo)

1. "Limousine" (American Edit) - 5:13
2. "Limousine" (American Re-mix) - 7:10
3. "The Picture" - 3:24
4. "The Picture" (Curb 1985) - 3:24

== Personnel ==
Hubert Kah

- Hubert Kemmler – vocals, arranger
- Markus Löhr – guitar, keyboards, arranger
- Klaus Hirschburger – bass, arranger

Additional musicians

- Lothar Krell – keyboards, arranger on "Limousine"
- Curt Cress – drums
- Judy Cheeks, Victoria Miles, Patricia Shockley – backing vocals on "Limousine"

Production

- Michael Cretu, Armand Volker – producers, arranger
- Boris Granich, Christer Modig – American remix

Other

- Mike Schmidt at Ink Studios – cover
- Dieter Eikelpoth – photography

== Charts ==
| Chart (1986) | Peak position |
|---|---|
| European Hot 100 Singles | 88 |
| German Singles Chart | 8 |
| Swiss Singles Chart | 25 |
