= Experiments in Expectation =

Experiments In Expectation

Studio album by Kill Sadie
- Released: May 8, 2001
- Genre: Post-hardcore
- Label: Dim Mak Records

Professional ratings
Review scores
Source	Rating
AbsolutePunk	(91%)
AllMusic	3/5 stars

Experiments in Expectation was the final full-length release album by Seattle-based band Kill Sadie. It was released on Dim Mak Records in 2001.

== Track listing ==
1. "The Ivy League Donor (Prescription Epidemic)" - 6:21
2. "The Laugh Track for Contemporary Music" - 2:46
3. "Rebirth Through Adaptation" - 2:07
4. "Erf (The Place You Live)" - 4:49
5. "The Quieting/Function of Mouth" - 3:50
6. "The Surgeon's Muse" - 3:31
7. "Untitled Number Three Hundred and Three" - 2:07
8. "The Cocktail Party Effect" - 3:35
9. "A Ride in the Centrifuge" - 3:38
10. "An Antiquated Bluff" - 8:33
