= Bobot Adrenaline =

American musical group

- Origin: Los Angeles, California, United States
- Genres: Rock, punk rock
- Years active: 2001–present
- Labels: Basement Records, Geykido Comet Records
- Members: Pepper Berry; Corey Mac; Bryan Panzeri

Bobot Adrenaline is an American Los Angeles–based political rock band with punk aggressions formed in 2001, featuring Pepper Berry from the now defunct Buck.

After five songs released on several Geykido Comet Records compilations (one being This Just In... Benefit For Indy Media) the band went into the studio and recorded their debut EP, Unfurled, in 2007. It was produced by Tommy Stinson. Unfurled was released on August 27, 2008, on CD Baby.

In 2009, the band signed with Southern California punk record label Basement Records in order to release their second album, Dumb Bomb in 2010. They have performed at the Troubadour.

== Members ==
- Pepper Berry – vocals, guitars
- Corey Mac – bass
- Bryan Panzeri – drums

=== Former members ===
- Debo – drums
- Mike Wasson – drums

== Discography ==
- This Just In... Benefit For Indy Media
- Six Steps To A Better You: Six Band CD
- Unfurled (2008)
- Chemical X DVD Music Video Compilation (2008)
- Dumb Bomb (2010)

== In other media ==
Bobot Adrenaline’s anti-death penalty anthem "Penalty Box" was featured in the video game Tony Hawk's American Wasteland. Also, the band's "Wasted Youth" was featured on the 2010 re-release of Tony Hawk's Pro Skater 2 for the iPhone OS.

== Press ==
ONE OF THE TOP 5 RECORDS OF 2008 "[UNFURLED is] beat pounding and harmonizing from track to track". – BIG WHEEL MAGAZINE

"Bobot Adrenaline proves pop punk and a social consciousness aren't mutually exclusive." – PUNK PLANET

... Bobot Adrenaline stepped up, a sweet trio of LA pop punks who crooned about bullies, anarchists, sham elections, the death penalty and Bulgarian rock. They were great and bouncy, stuff destined for airplay on our mental radio station... – OC WEEKLY

"...diversity of influences and creative spark inherent in their tunes..." – RAZORCAKE

OC Weekly praised the band's political lyrical themes, specifically highlighting the track "Radio Tikrit." The review noted the song's musical similarity to The Clash's "The Guns of Brixton" and its focus on CIA-operated propaganda stations during the Iraq War.

In other anti-war news, Green Day, John Mellencamp, Bobot Adrenaline, Anti-Flag (with the Donots), Courtesy, and, as previously reported, the Beastie Boys, have also posted anti-war songs on their websites. – DELUSIONS OF ADEQUACY NEWS

Bobot go for a Dangerhouse [Records]-type of sound. – MAXIMUM ROCK N ROLL
