= Bear vs. Shark =

American post-hardcore band

- Origin: Highland, Michigan, U.S.
- Genres: Post-hardcore, emo, indie rock, punk rock
- Years active: 2001–2005, 2016–present
- Labels: Equal Vision
- Spinoffs: Champions of History, Wildcatting
- Members: Marc Paffi; Derek Kiesgen; Mike Muldoon; John Gaviglio; Ashley Horak
- Past members: Brandon Moss

Bear vs. Shark are an American post-hardcore band from Highland, Michigan. They were founded in 2001 and disbanded in 2005 after releasing one EP and two full-length studio albums while signed to Equal Vision Records. The band later reunited for some shows in 2016.

== History ==
=== Formation ===
The members of the group have known each other all their lives with some members forming friendships as early as pre-school. The band formed during their college years when the members were playing in separate projects. The group's original drummer Brandon Moss left the group and was replaced by Ashley Horak. The group has cited classic rock and punk as well as The Clash, Fugazi, and Motown as influences to the group's sound.

The group initially sent a demo to Equal Vision Records and a representative from the label flew out immediately to sign the group. Since the release of Right Now You're in the Best of Hands... the band has toured the United States extensively headlining & opening for other major acts such as Coheed and Cambria. The group quickly gained attention from fans and fellow musicians as well. The group is also known for their high-energy stage show most notably by Marc Paffi, who is known to move around the stage frantically during performances. Most of the band members also switched playing instruments during their sets, which was a regular occasion. Though it has been circulated that the band's name comes from the shape of Michigan, Gaviglio has said in an interview that they believed it was "super badass and sounded interesting."

=== Reunion ===
On May 22, 2016, the band announced a reunion show to benefit Flintkids.org in Flint, Michigan, which later followed with a small string of additional dates. Equal Vision Records also released info on a re-issuing of the band's two full-length albums on a joint vinyl release.

== Post Bear vs. Shark ==
Mike Muldoon and John Gaviglio together with help of Mark Maynard have started a band project called Cannons, centralized in Brooklyn.

Right Now, You're in the Best of Hands... and Terrorhawk were released on vinyl by Friction Records, with Right Now, You're in the Best of Hands included two previously unreleased tracks, "California Hot Seat" (originally heard on the (1653 EP) and "June 7". Also, a special picture disc version of Terrorhawk was released, with artwork by Jeff VandenBerg.

Marc Paffi recorded vocals for the song "1999" on the band If He Dies He Dies release Conquistador on Friction Records.

Marc Paffi, Mike Muldoon, and Brandon Moss started a band together called Champions of History.

Brandon Moss is also a member of the band Wildcatting. In addition to Wildcatting, Brandon Moss also plays horns in Don't Stand So Close To Me, a jazz/fusion ensemble that mixes solid hits from The Police.

John Gaviglio played in Matthew Dear's Big Hands

== Band members ==
Final line-up

- Marc Paffi – lead vocals, guitar, keyboards
- Derek Kiesgen – guitar, bass
- Mike Muldoon – guitar, bass, keyboards
- John Gaviglio – guitar, bass, backing vocals
- Ashley Horak – drums (2003–2005)

Past members

- Brandon Moss – drums (2001–2003)

2016 line-up

- Marc Paffi – lead vocals, guitar, keyboards
- Derek Kiesgen – guitar, bass
- Nick Jones – guitar, bass, keyboards
- John Gaviglio – guitar, bass, backing vocals
- Brandon Moss – drums, percussion
- Ashley Horak – drums, percussion, piano, backing vocals

== Discography ==
Studio albums

- Right Now, You're in the Best of Hands. And If Something Isn't Quite Right, Your Doctor Will Know in a Hurry (2003, Equal Vision Records)
- Terrorhawk (2005, Equal Vision Records)

EPs

- 1653 (2001, Self Released)

Compilations

- Right Now, You're in the Best of Hands/Terrorhawk Joint Vinyl (2016, Equal Vision Records)

== Music videos ==
- Catamaran (2005)
