= Makers (album) =

Studio album by Rocky Votolato
- Released: January 24, 2006
- Genre: Indie
- Length: 37:57
- Label: Barsuk Records

Rocky Votolato chronology
Suicide Medicine (2003)	Makers (2006)	End Like This (2007)

Makers is a 2006 album from Seattle singer-songwriter Rocky Votolato. It marks his debut on Barsuk Records after previously releasing albums on Second Nature Records. The album is characterized by a folk sound and sparse arrangements, focusing mainly on Votolato's voice, guitar work, and songwriting.

== Track listing ==
1. "White Daisy Passing" – 3:07
2. "Portland Is Leaving" – 2:45
3. "The Night's Disguise" – 3:17
4. "She Was Only in It for the Rain" – 3:09
5. "Uppers Aren't Necessary" – 2:55
6. "Wait Out the Days" – 2:43
7. "Streetlights" – 2:29
8. "Tennessee Train Tracks" – 2:25
9. "Goldfield" – 3:32
10. "Tinfoil Hats" – 2:39
11. "Where We Left Off" – 5:38
12. "Makers" – 3:18

Professional ratings
Review scores
Source	Rating
AllMusic	4/5 stars
Pitchfork	4.2/10 stars
Rolling Stone	3/5 stars

== In popular culture ==
"White Daisy Passing" was featured in the closing credits of the film Cthulhu (2007) as well as in the TV show The O.C. (2003–2007).
