= Right Now, You're in the Best of Hands. And If Something Isn't Quite Right, Your Doctor Will Know in a Hurry =

Studio album by Bear vs. Shark
- Released: July 15, 2003
- Recorded: 2003
- Genres: Post-hardcore, emo, indie rock
- Length: 40:41
- Labels: Equal Vision, Big Scary Monsters
- Producer: Brad Blackwood

Bear vs. Shark chronology
1653 (2001)	Right Now, You're in the Best of Hands. And If Something Isn't Quite Right, Your Doctor Will Know in a Hurry (2003)	Terrorhawk (2005)

Alternative cover
- Cover for the Big Scary Monsters pressing.

Professional ratings
Review scores
Source	Rating
AllMusic	4/5 stars
Alternative Press	4/5

Right Now, You're in the Best of Hands. And If Something Isn't Quite Right, Your Doctor Will Know in a Hurry is the debut album by the post-hardcore band Bear vs. Shark.

It is commonly referred to as "Right Now, You're in the Best of Hands..." due to its long name. The name of the album is derived from a sign that singer Marc Paffi saw and thought was interesting.

The first vinyl pressing of the album featured two bonus tracks, which appear at the beginning of the album as opposed to the end of it. The vinyl version also has completely different artwork than the CD.

The album was pressed a second time on the UK's Big Scary Records and was limited to 250 hand-numbered copies.

== Track listing ==
All tracks are written by Bear vs. Shark.

No.	Title	Length
1.	"Ma Jolie"	3:51
2.	"Campfire"	2:12
3.	"Buses/No Buses"	3:14
4.	"The Employee Is Not Afraid"	4:10
5.	"We Were Sad But Now We're Rebuilding"	2:17
6.	"Kylie"	3:56
7.	"MPS"	2:55
8.	"Second"	3:21
9.	"Don't Tell the Horses the Stable's on Fire"	2:50
10.	"Bloodgiver"	4:32
11.	"Michigan"	2:32
12.	"Broken Dog Leg"	4:51
Total length:		40:41

Vinyl bonus tracks
No.	Title	Length
13.	"June 7th" (track #2 on the Friction Records pressing)	2:39
14.	"California Hot Seat" (track #1 on the Friction Records pressing)	2:30

First pressing: 1000 copies

- 250 half and half light blue/light yellow
- 250 half and half green/clear
- 250 half and half purple/white
- 250 one side white/one side black

Second pressing: 250 copies

- 250 Red/black haze

== Personnel ==
Bear vs. Shark

- Marc Paffi – lead vocals, guitar, keyboards
- Derek Kiesgen – guitar, bass
- Mike Muldoon – guitar, bass, keyboards
- John Gaviglio – guitar, bass, backing vocals
- Brandon Moss – drums

Additional

- Brad Blackwood – mastering
- Jason Mareydt – artwork
- Marc Paffi – artwork
- Joe Pedulla – mixing
- Arun Venkatesh – engineer
