= Burning My Travels Clean =

Studio album by Rocky Votolato
- Released: April 2002
- Recorded: July 2001
- Genre: Folk-Rock
- Length: 36:42
- Label: Second Nature Recordings
- Producer: Rocky Votolato

Rocky Votolato chronology
A Brief History (2000)	Burning My Travels Clean (2002)	The Light and the Sound (2003)

Professional ratings
Review scores
Source	Rating
Allmusic	link

Burning My Travels Clean is an album by Rocky Votolato. It was released on April 16, 2002, by the independent label Second Nature Recordings. The album incorporates a number of folk elements (the predominance of acoustic guitar, the use of fiddle, and lyrics centered on the loneliness or isolation of the singer and his impoverished background) but also contains clear strains of rock music. The major themes of the album include his relationship with his wife and his dedication to music. The album received very little press upon its release, going unmentioned by both the independent and mainstream music critic publications.

== Track listing ==
All tracks by Rocky Votolato

1. "Crabtree And Evelyn" – 4:06
2. "Holding Onto Water" – 3:47
3. "October" – 3:03
4. "Like Silver" – 4:03
5. "Without Eyes Still Seeing" – 1:58
6. "Don't Walk Out On Me" – 4:27
7. "Treasure Chest" – 4:07
8. "Swallowing Swords" – 2:51
9. "Like A Mother" – 3:32
10. "Deep In The Earth" – 4:42
11. "I Remember Music" – 4:13

== Personnel ==
- Matt Bayles – Producer, Engineer
- Ed Brooks – Mastering
- Dan Dean – Drums, Art Direction, Design
- Jeff Lopez – Photography
- James Mendenhall – Piano
- Kevin Suggs – Pedal Steel
- Rosanne Thomas – Vocals (background)
- Troy Tietjen – Assistant Engineer
- Cody Votolato – Guitar (Electric)
- Rocky Votolato – Guitar, Vocals
- Seth Warren – Violin
