= J. Clark =

American musician

Jason Crowe Clark is an American musician from Minneapolis, Minnesota who became well known after moving to Seattle, Washington. He has played guitar in Pretty Girls Make Graves, and Killsadie, as well as drums in Sharks Keep Moving and Jaguar Love

== Discography ==
With Killsadie

- Kill Sadie EP (THD Records, 1998)
- Half Cocked Concepts 10 (Old Glory Records, 1998)
- In Half Cocked Concepts CD (includes THD 7") (One Percent Records, 1999)
- Split 7" with Brand New Unit (Modern Radio, 2000)
- A New Make 7" (Redwood Records, 2000)
- Experiments In Expectation LP/CD (Dim Mak Records, 2001)
- We're All a Little Sick CD Remixes B-Sides (Satellite City, 2004)

With Sharks Keep Moving

- Pause and Clause EP - (Status, 2002)

With Pretty Girls Make Graves

- Good Health (2002, Lookout)
- The New Romance (2003, Matador)
- Élan Vital (2006, Matador)
- Pretty Girls Make Graves EP (2001, Dim Mak)
- More Sweet Soul b/w If You Hate Your Friends, You're Not Alone (2001, Sub Pop)
- Sad Girls Por Vida b/w The Getaway (2002, Sound Virus)
- By The Throat b/w Ghosts In The Radio & More Sweet Soul (2002, Hand Held Heart)
- Speakers Push The Air b/w Bring It On Golden Pond & If You Hate Your Friends, You're Not Alone (2002, Dim Mak)
- This Is Our Emergency (2002, Matador)
- All Medicated Geniuses b/w C-30 C-60 C-90 GO! & Magic Lights (2003, Matador)
- Pyrite Pedestal b/w The Lament of St. Bernadette (2006, Matador)
- Live Session EP (2006, Matador)
- "C-30 C-60 C-90 GO!" by Bow Wow Wow

With Jaguar Love

- Highways of Gold 7" Single - June 3, 2008
- Jaguar Love EP - June 3, 2008
- Take Me to the Sea - August 19, 2008
