= Pretty Girls Make Graves =

American band

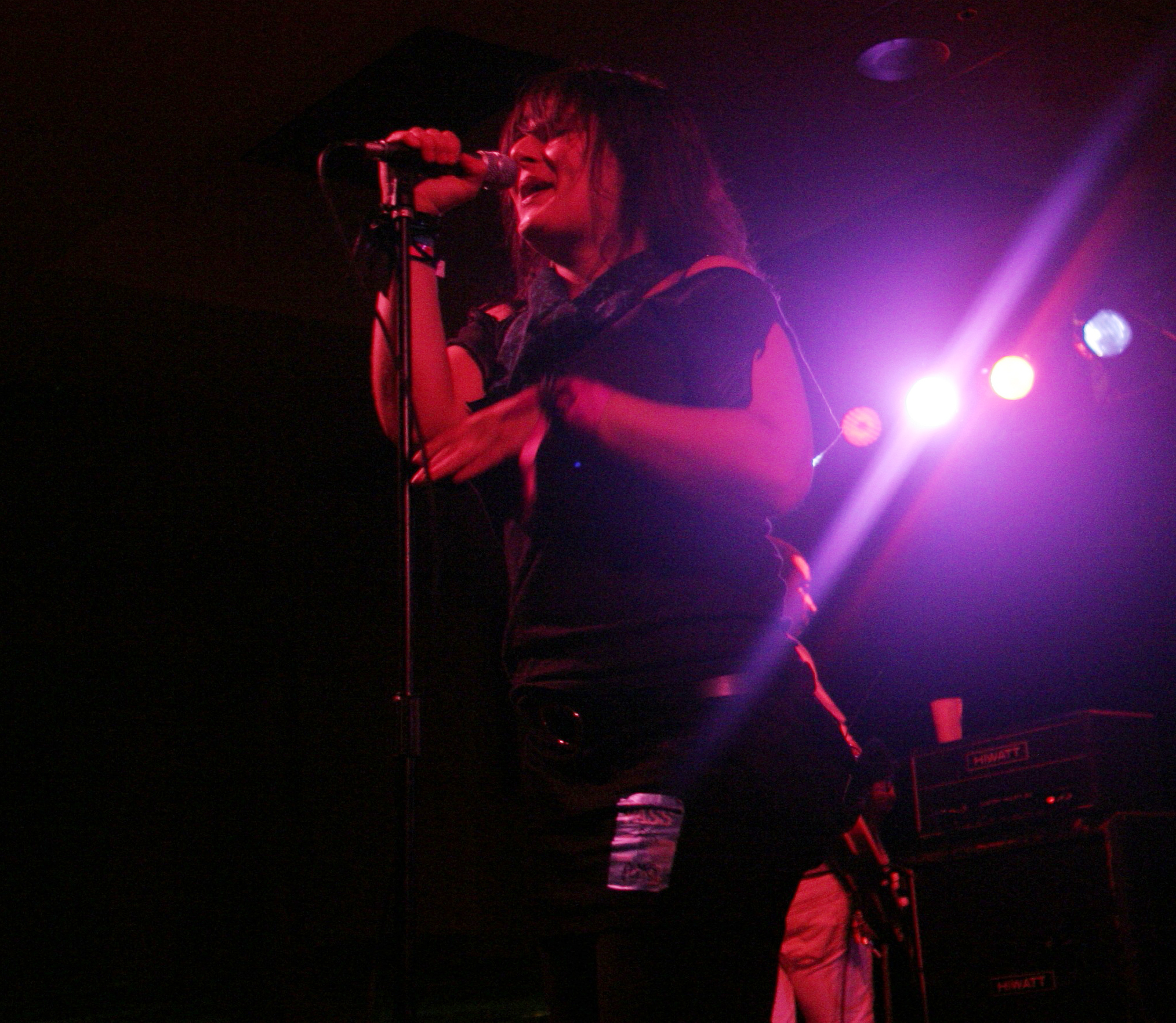
- Live in 2005

Background information
- Origin: Seattle, Washington, U.S.
- Genres: Post-hardcore, post-punk, indie rock, emo
- Years active: 2001–2007, 2023–present
- Labels: Lookout, Matador
- Members: Andrea Zollo; Derek Fudesco; Leona Marrs; J. Clark; Nick Dewitt
- Past members: Nathan Thelen

Pretty Girls Make Graves is a post-hardcore band formed in Seattle in 2001, named after The Smiths' song of the same name (which itself was named after a quote from Jack Kerouac's The Dharma Bums). Andrea Zollo and Derek Fudesco had played together previously in The Hookers, as well as The Death Wish Kids and Area 51 along with Dann Gallucci, with whom Derek had formed Murder City Devils. Not long before the Murder City Devils disbanded, Derek and Andrea formed Pretty Girls Make Graves along with Jay, Nick and Nathan. They played the Coachella Valley Music and Arts Festival in 2004. The band announced its split on January 29, 2007, with their final two shows taking place in Seattle that June.

== History ==
Pretty Girls Make Graves released their first EP on Dim Mak and Sound Virus Records. The band was pursued by such record labels as Sub Pop and Lookout Records. Pretty Girls Make Graves went on to tour with Bratmobile, whose drummer Molly Neuman ran Lookout. Neuman made the band an offer and they accepted, in part because the label had released Ted Leo and the Pharmacists' 2001 album The Tyranny of Distance.

The band released their debut album Good Health in April 2002. The band would later sign to Matador Records where they released The New Romance. A few months after The New Romance was released, guitarist Nathan Thelen left the band due to the birth of his child. Thelen went on to form Moonrats.

The band wanted to add a new full-time member, but also sought to move away from their earlier, more guitar-based sound. Leona Marrs, formerly of HintHint, joined as a multi-instrumentalist. In 2005, the band released their third full-length, Elan Vital. On January 29, 2007, the band announced that Nick had left the band and their May 2007 tour would be their last.

=== Post-breakup projects ===
Clark formed Jaguar Love with former Blood Brothers members Johnny Whitney and Cody Votolato. They signed with Matador Records, the former label home of Pretty Girls Make Graves. On February 18, 2009, it was announced Jay was no longer playing in the line up of Jaguar Love, being replaced with a drum machine on that tour.

Dewitt continued working on his solo electronic project Dutch Dub. He also played with Amy Blaschke in Night Canopy. Fudesco, meanwhile, formed The Cave Singers, with Pete Quirk of Hint Hint and Marty Lund of Cobra High.

Soon after leaving Pretty Girls Make Graves, Thelen started Moonrats in Seattle together with keyboard player Aska Matsumiya and drummer Jason Echeverria. They moved to Los Angeles and released an EP on their own. They put out a full-length and a 7" on LA Records in 2008. Thelen then formed Drug Cabin, with Marcus Congleton of Ambulance Ltd, releasing two albums in early 2015 on 401K Music Inc.

Zollo played drums with Triumph of Lethargy Skinned Alive to Death, and also sang in Deep Creep with Fudesco. She later left the music industry, and began work as a hairstylist.

=== Reunion ===
In November 2023, the band were announced on the line-up for the 2024 iteration of the When We Were Young festival. There, the band would perform The New Romance in its entirety. In February 2024, the band announced a headlining show to take place at The Showbox in Seattle that September, as well as shows in Brooklyn and Los Angeles. In 2025, the band would play at Best Friends Forever festival in Las Vegas and Bumbershoot festival in Seattle.

== Influences ==
Pretty Girls Make Graves were a result of a wide variety of influences. According to guitarist J. Clark, vocalist Andrea Zollo and bassist Derek Fudesco are inspired by new wave music, while drummer Nick Dewitt draws on Captain Beefheart. Clark himself has cited as personal influences Fugazi, Chavez, Yo La Tengo, and Drive Like Jehu, as well as dub, jazz, and hardcore punk.

== Members ==
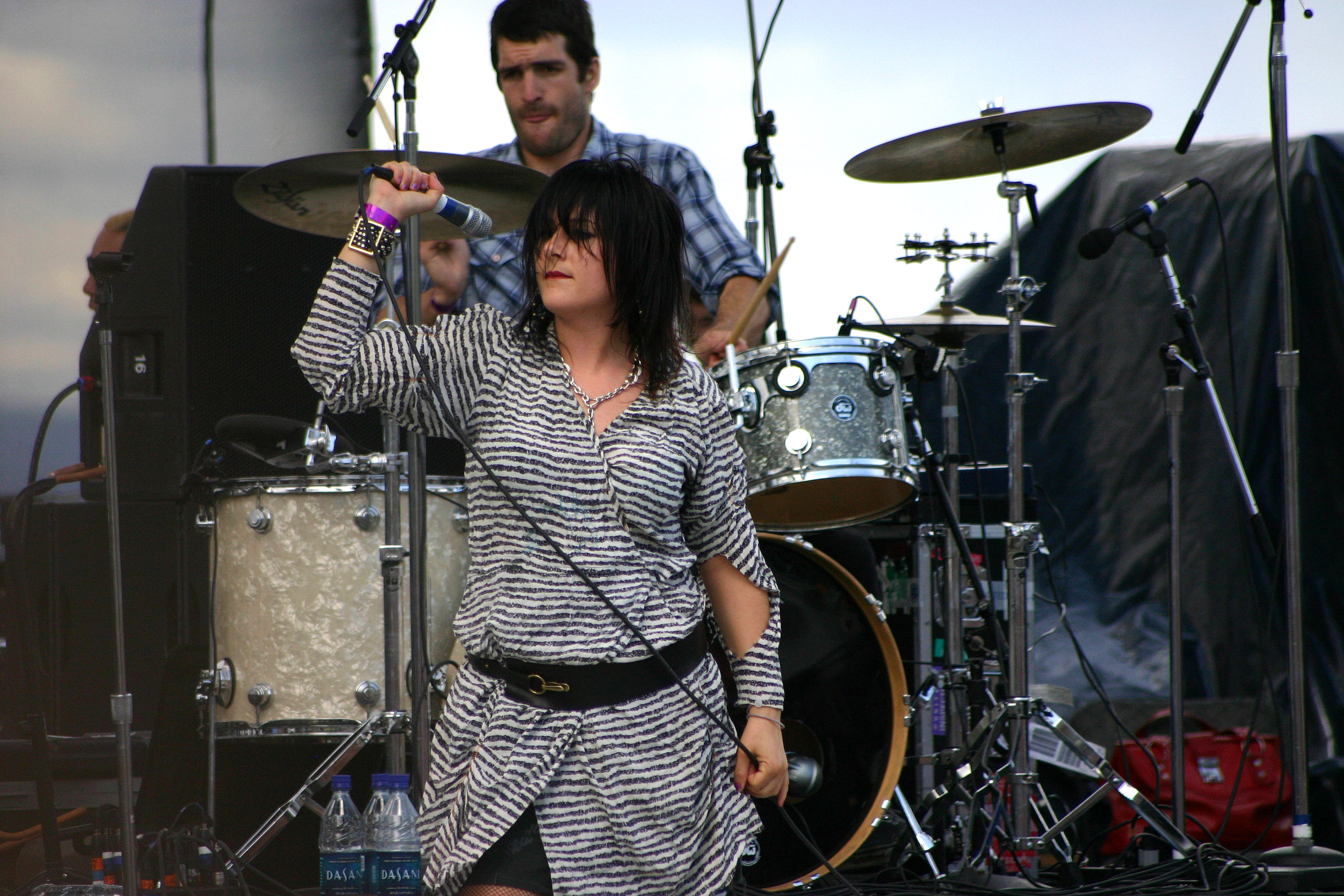
The band in 2006

Current members

- Andrea Zollo – lead vocals (2001–2007, 2023–present)
- Derek Fudesco – bass, backing vocals (2001–2007, 2023–present)
- J. Clark – guitar, keyboards, samples, backing vocals (2001–2007, 2023–present)
- Nick Dewitt – drums, samples, keyboards, trumpet, backing vocals (2001–2007, 2023–present)
- Leona Marrs – keyboards, accordion, backing vocals (2004–2007, 2023–present)

Former members

- Nathan Thelen – guitar, backing vocals (2001–2004)

== Discography ==
=== Studio albums ===
- Good Health (2002, Lookout)
- The New Romance (2003, Matador)
- Élan Vital (2006, Matador)

=== Singles and EPs ===
- Pretty Girls Make Graves EP (2001, Dim Mak)
- "More Sweet Soul" b/w "If You Hate Your Friends, You're Not Alone" (2001, Sub Pop)
- "Sad Girls Por Vida" b/w "The Getaway" (2002, Sound Virus)
- "By The Throat" b/w "Ghosts In The Radio" & "More Sweet Soul" (2002, Hand Held Heart)
- "Speakers Push the Air" b/w "Bring It On Golden Pond" & "If You Hate Your Friends, You're Not Alone" (2002, Dim Mak)
- "This Is Our Emergency" (2002, Matador)
- "All Medicated Geniuses" b/w "C-30 C-60 C-90 GO!" & "Magic Lights" (2003, Matador)
- "Pyrite Pedestal" b/w "The Lament of St. Bernadette" (2006, Matador)
- Live Session EP (2006, Matador)

== Videography ==
- "Speakers Push the Air" (2002)
- "This Is Our Emergency" (2003)
- "All Medicated Geniuses" (2003)
- "The Nocturnal House" (2006)
