= The Limousines =

American band

- Genres: Electronic rock, indietronica, alternative rock
- Years active: 2007–present
- Labels: Dangerbird, Orchard City Books and Noise, Makeyousick, Universal Republic
- Members: Eric Victorino; Giovanni Giusti
- Website: thelimousines.com

The Limousines are an American electronica band based out of California's San Francisco Bay Area. Made up of multi-instrumentalist/producer Giovanni Giusti and songwriter/vocalist Eric Victorino, the duo formed in 2007 and has since gained international fame, thanks in part to the release of their singles "Very Busy People" and "Internet Killed the Video Star". Their first full-length album, Get Sharp, was released July 27, 2010 to critical acclaim. On December 13, 2010, the band officially signed with Dangerbird Records, but have since left the label and independently recorded and produced their second album, Hush, which was released on June 4, 2013.

== History ==
In 2007, while in England, Eric Victorino was first introduced to Giovanni Giusti after a mutual friend of theirs had played Victorino a remixed Jay-Z album that Giusti had produced, dubbed The Bloody Album. Victorino later emailed Giusti, expressing his enthusiasm for the music Giusti was making and they began a regular correspondence through the internet. At the time, Giusti was home in California's East Bay area, where he was attending a music and visual arts college. The two eventually began sending each other ideas for what would later become the music of The Limousines; with Giusti sending beats to Victorino and Victorino sending lyrics and melodies to Giusti. Through this collaborative process, without ever meeting face-to-face, they managed to construct multiple songs.

The pair finally met in person for the first time while they were at The Panda Studios in Oakland, California to record their songs "Scrapbook 1998" and "New Year's Resolution." Individually, they had been working on their own separate musical endeavors while, at the same time, using The Limousines as another type of creative outlet. Though, as The Limousines, they had digitally composed many demo tracks, which they posted on their band's Myspace and Tumblr sites, but had yet to release any physical product.

Aaron Axelsen, a music director from Bay Area radio station Live 105, received The Limousines' "New Year's Resolution" demo and played it on his weekly, Sunday evening radio show, Soundcheck. This, coupled with the airplay that Michael Solari, a promotions director at another Bay Area radio station, Channel 92.3, gave "Very Busy People", helped further spread word about The Limousines and greatly increase the band's already growing fanbase. Eventually, "Very Busy People" was picked up by SiriusXM satellite radio, even before the band signed a single song deal with Universal Republic for the song, and became a frequently played track on the station's Alt Nation channel. The song was the seventh most requested song for the year 2009 on the channel's Alt-18 Countdown.

By late 2009, The Limousines had independently released their first official collection of songs; a dual 7" white vinyl EP entitled Scrapbook, featuring four songs originally available only as MP3 demos: "Scrapbook 1998", "Plans Are Just Coincidence", "New Year's Resolution", and "ithinkican"; in January 2012, however, Scrapbook was re-released in CD format and featured two bonus tracks: "To Be Adored" (previously a promo single to Get Sharp) and "Short'n Sweet". Though the band was still unsigned, they had been in contact with record labels. However, without having practically any other songs written and with high industry expectations to do a full-length album in a short amount of time, which they were unable to do, they weren't ready to make any deals.

The band continued writing and promoting their music and on June 17, 2010, they announced that their debut album would be entitled Get Sharp.

In December 2010 Dangerbird Records officially welcomed The Limousines to their roster. Also in December 2010, the song "Internet Killed the Video Star" reached #1 on the Sirius-XM Alt-18 Countdown. Their growing success and new contract also earned them a feature article in issue 24 of alternative scene magazine Substream Music Press, published for April/May 2011.

The band toured as main support for Neon Trees in May 2011, spanning the midwest and east coast of the United States.

For the week of May 2, 2011, MTV began featuring the band on MTV Push Week, a promotional segment aired in between shows.

In May 2011, MTV featured the music video for "Internet Killed the Video Star".

The band began a North American tour in support of The Sounds in October, 2011, with the final show of the tour scheduled for November 22, 2011 in Vancouver, British Columbia, Canada. In November, 2011, the Sounds announced that they will be touring Europe with the Limousines in early 2012.

On August 14, 2015, the Limousines released their third single, "Stumble Back to You".

== Get Sharp ==
Recorded primarily in Giusti's home studio, with some vocals done alongside engineer Todd Cooper at Street Symphony Studios, Get Sharp was composed in the same fashion as their previous work together; with the two sending lyrics and music back and forth to each other and exchanging ideas until finally meeting to record in the studio. Pre-ordering of the CD started on June 28, 2010, and the first 100 to do so received an autograph copy. Included with the first 100 was a piece of writing significantly used during the album's recording sessions; on it was a Limousines stamp of authenticity. San Francisco, Ca session drummer, Cary LaScala, performed a various amount of live shows with the band during the release of Get Sharp in 2010 into 2011.

Inspired by a great video idea the band had for their song "Internet Killed The Video Star", they enlisted the help of family and friends and went to work on creating their first official music video. On June 23, 2010, The Limousines released the video on their official YouTube channel.

Still without a record label to help back them, Victorino and Giusti officially released Get Sharp on July 27, 2010, through Orchard City Books & Noise. The album was made available in Hot Topic stores nationwide and on Amazon.com, iTunes, Myspace, Spotify and through various other music outlets. Pre-ordering for the 12" vinyl LP of the album began on December 27, 2010, with the first 500 copies autographed by the band. It was officially released January 6, 2011.

== Hush ==
Hush was The Limousines' second studio album, released in 2013. The first single on this album was titled "Love Is A Dog From Hell".

== Kickstarter funding ==
The Limousines used Kickstarter to fund their next album entirely. Initially planning to raise $30,000, fans donated $76,000 before the 30-day close. This huge success for The Limousines left them contract- and label-free for their Hush album.

== Discography ==
=== Studio albums ===
- Get Sharp (2010)
- Hush (2013)

=== EPs ===
- Scrapbook (2009)
