= Jaguar Love =

American post-punk band

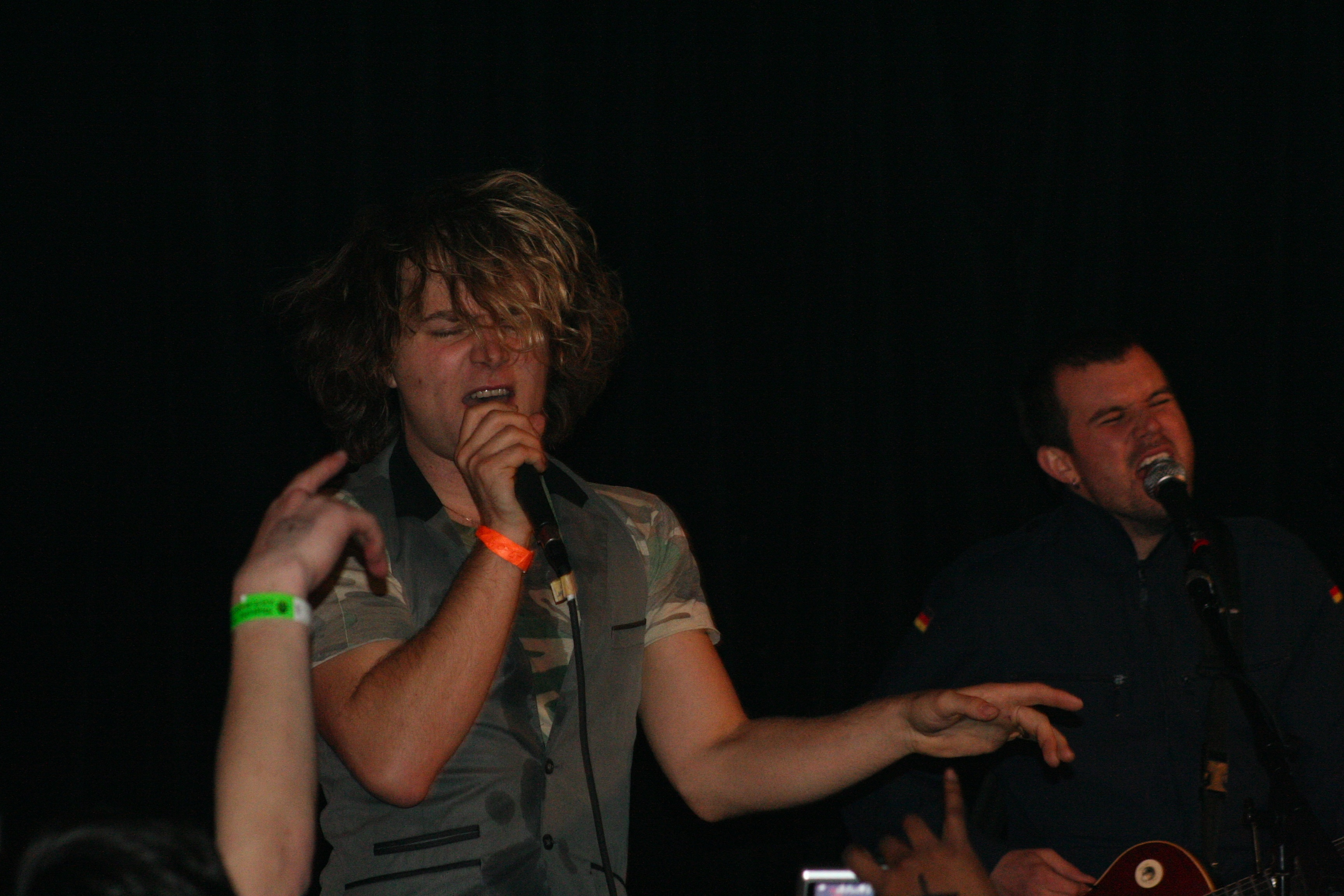
- Johnny Whitney (foreground), Cody Votolato (background)

Background information
- Origin: Seattle, Washington
- Genres: Post-punk, art punk, experimental rock
- Years active: 2007–2010
- Labels: Matador Records, Fat Possum Records
- Members: Johnny Whitney; Cody Votolato
- Past members: J. Clark
- Website: Official site

Jaguar Love was an American post-punk band formed in Portland, Oregon in 2007. It was composed of former members of The Blood Brothers.

== History ==
The band was formed by members of the bands Blood Brothers and Pretty Girls Make Graves. On January 21, 2008, the band announced via MySpace that they had signed to Matador Records, former home of Pretty Girls Make Graves.

Their debut album "Take Me to the Sea" was released digitally on August 18, 2008, on Matador Records. The album leaked onto the internet on July 15, 2008.

Johnny Whitney's vocals have been described as "like Robert Plant on steroids, or Perry Farrell after a sex change".

They toured Europe in summer 2008, including appearances at major festivals such as T in the Park, which was followed by an American tour, opening for Polysics, before again touring internationally later in the year.

They announced via MySpace on February 18, 2009, on a bulletin that they would be making changes to their line-up as well as their sound.

Hey Everyone

We'll we are waiting in the Portland Airport right now about to leave for Australia to play the Soundwave festival, do some club shows with Minus the Bear, and do two shows in Sydney and Melbourne with Nine Inch Nails. We are extremely honored and very totally excited to be playing these shows. I wanted to take this opportunity to let you all know that we have changed up the sound and line up a bit for the upcoming shows. We are no longer playing with J and are going to be touring as a two piece, just Cody and I playing to a drum machine. We will be playing only 3 songs from the record, (Highways of Gold, Bats over the Pacific, and Jaguar Pirates) but they sound a bit different now, it's almost like we remixed them and are playing the remixes. The rest of the set will composed of new songs (Boom, Polariods and Red Wine, Evaline, I started a Fire, and Tricerisaurus-Hex) and a Minor Threat cover (Small Man, Big Mouth). The vibe of the new material is kind of Daft Punk meets New Order meets Black Flag and we are really really excited to be debuting it for all you aussies! We'll try to film some of them and put them on our myspace so all you non-Australians can check them out. Tally ho and see you all soon! xo

johnny

The band signed to Fat Possum Records. On November 3, 2009, the band posted a song entitled "Up All Night". The song was heard frequently during their tour in the summer of 2009. The band released their second album "Hologram Jams" on March 2, 2010.

== Influences and musical style ==
Johnny and Cody's previous band the Blood Brothers showcased Johnny's screams, whereas Jaguar Love takes a more straight-forward indie rock approach, incorporating elements of baroque pop, art rock, soul, hip-hop, experimental music and post-punk.

Jaguar Love were influenced by Gang of Four, Jay-Z, New Order, Bootsy Collins, Weezer, Botch, Antioch Arrow and The Smiths.

In their latest material, they turn to a more new wave/dance-punk style.

== Members ==
- Cody Votolato – guitar, bass
- Johnny Whitney – vocals, piano

Former members

- J. Clark – drums, bass, keyboards

Support members

- Craig Bonich – bass
- Zach Richards – drums

== Discography ==
- Highways of Gold 7" Single - June 3, 2008
- Jaguar Love EP - June 3, 2008
- Take Me to the Sea - August 19, 2008
- Hologram Jams - March 2, 2010
