= Melvins discography =

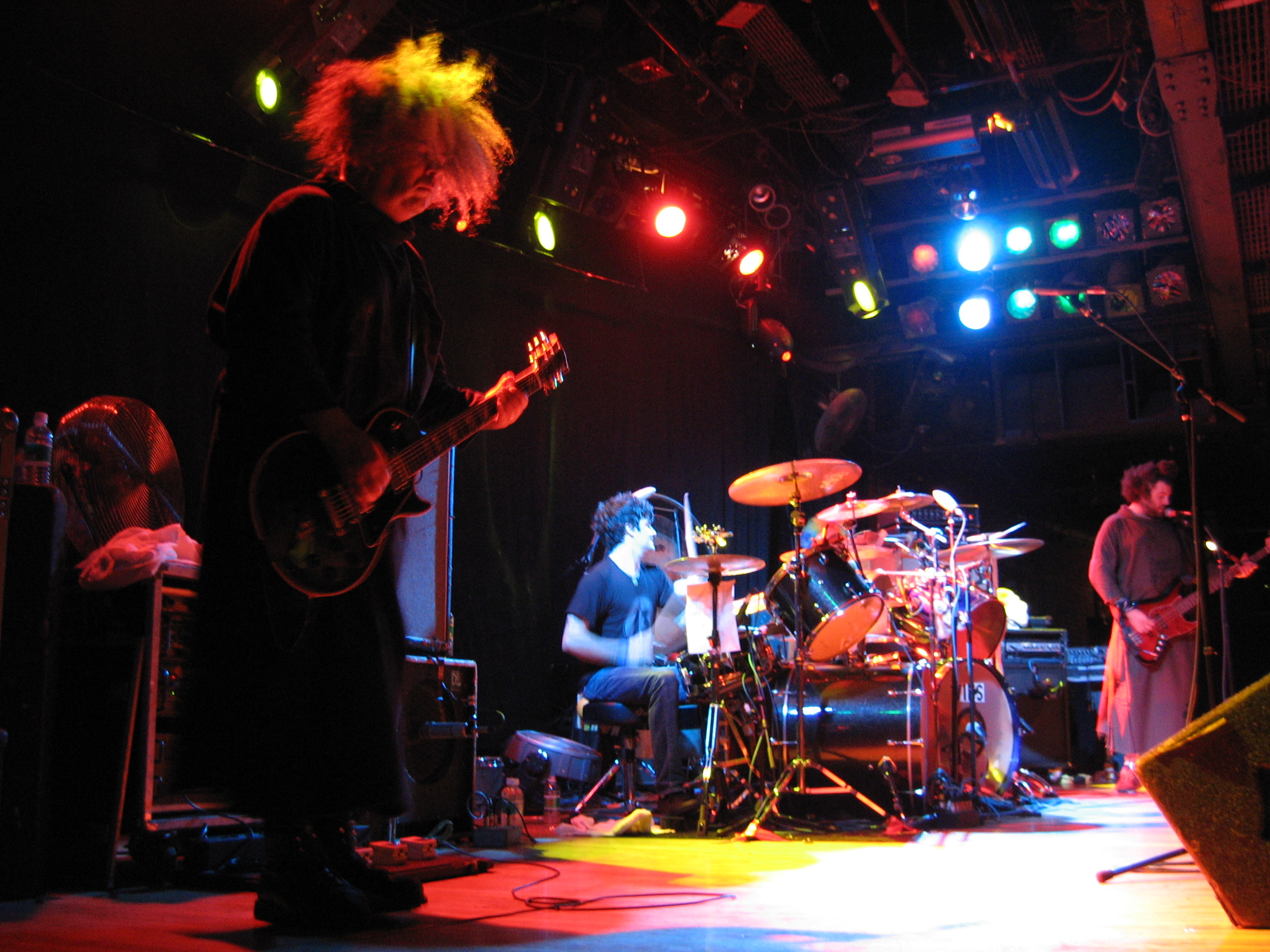
- Melvins in 2006. Left to right: Buzz Osborne, Coady Willis, Dale Crover (hidden behind the drums) and Jared Warren.
- Studio albums: 28
- Extended plays: 19
- Live albums: 7
- Compilation albums: 8
- Singles: 53
- Video albums: 1
- Music videos: 11
- Miscellaneous: 25

This article contains the discography for Melvins, an American rock band that formed in Aberdeen, Washington in 1983. Their discography includes many items that are limited to a few copies which are not represented here.

== Albums ==
=== Studio albums ===
Title	Details	References
Gluey Porch Treatments	Release date: 1987; Label: Alchemy Records; Format: LP, cassette, CD	
Ozma	Release date: November 1, 1989; Label: Boner Records; Format: LP, cassette, CD	
Bullhead	Release date: January 28, 1991; Label: Boner Records; Format: LP, CD, cassette	
Lysol	Release date: November 1992; Label: Boner Records; Format: CD, LP, cassette	
Houdini	Release date: September 21, 1993; Label: Atlantic Records; Format: CD, LP, cassette	
Prick	Release date: August 5, 1994; Label: Amphetamine Reptile Records; Format: CD, cassette, LP	
Stoner Witch	Release date: October 18, 1994; Label: Atlantic Records; Format: CD, LP, cassette	
Stag	Release date: July 15, 1996; Label: Atlantic Records; Format: CD, LP, cassette	
Honky	Release date: May 5, 1997; Label: Amphetamine Reptile Records; Format: CD, LP	
The Maggot	Release date: May 17, 1999; Label: Ipecac Recordings; Format: CD	
The Bootlicker	Release date: August 23, 1999; Label: Ipecac Recordings; Format: CD	
The Crybaby	Release date: February 7, 2000; Label: Ipecac Recordings; Format: CD	
Electroretard	Release date: February 6, 2001; Label: Man's Ruin Records; Format: CD	
Hostile Ambient Takeover	Release date: April 15, 2002; Label: Ipecac Recordings; Format: CD, LP	
(A) Senile Animal	Release date: October 10, 2006; Label: Ipecac Recordings; Format: CD, LP	
Nude with Boots	Release date: July 8, 2008; Label: Ipecac Recordings; Format: CD, LP	
The Bride Screamed Murder	Release date: June 1, 2010; Label: Ipecac Recordings; Format: CD, LP, digital download	
Freak Puke	Release date: June 5, 2012; Label: Ipecac Recordings; Format: CD, LP, digital download	
Everybody Loves Sausages	Release date: April 29th, 2013; Label: Ipecac Recordings; Format: CD, digital download, LP	
Tres Cabrones	Release date: November 5, 2013; Label: Ipecac Recordings; Format: CD, digital download, LP	
Hold It In	Release date: October 14, 2014; Label: Ipecac Recordings; Format: CD, LP, digital download	
Basses Loaded	Release date: June 3, 2016; Label: Ipecac Recordings; Format: CD, LP, digital download	
A Walk with Love & Death	Release date: July 7, 2017; Label: Ipecac Recordings; Format: CD, LP, cassette, digital download	
Pinkus Abortion Technician	Release date: April 20th, 2018; Label: Ipecac Recordings; Format: CD, LP, digital download	
Working with God	Release date: February 16, 2021; Label: Ipecac Recordings; Format: LP, CD, digital download, streaming	
Five Legged Dog	Release date: October 16, 2021; Label: Ipecac Recordings; Format: CD, LP, digital download, streaming	
Bad Mood Rising	Release date: August 14, 2022; Label: Amphetamine Reptile Records; Format: LP, CD, streaming	
Tarantula Heart	Release date: April 19, 2024; Label: Ipecac Recordings; Format: LP, CD, digital download, streaming	
Thunderball	Release date: April 19, 2025; Label: Ipecac Recordings; Format: CD, LP, digital download, streaming	

=== Collaboration albums ===
Title	Details	References
Pigs of the Roman Empire (with Lustmord)	Release date: August 23, 2004; Label: Ipecac Recordings; Format: CD, LP, digital download	
Never Breathe What You Can't See (with Jello Biafra)	Release date: October 19, 2004; Label: Alternative Tentacles; Format: CD, LP, digital download	
Sieg Howdy! (With Jello Biafra)	Release date: September 26, 2005; Label: Alternative Tentacles; Format: CD, LP	
Three Men and a Baby (with Mike Kunka)	Release date: April 1, 2016; Label: Sub Pop Records; Format: CD, cassette, LP	
Throbbing Jazz Gristle Funk Hits (with Void Manes)	Release date: June 25, 2023; Label: Amphetamine Reptile Records; Format: LP, CD	
Savage Imperial Death March (with Napalm Death)	Release date: April 10, 2026; Label: Ipecac Recordings; Format: LP, CD, streaming	

== Extended plays ==
Title	Details	References
Melvins	Release date: 1986; Label: C/Z Records; Format: 7"	
Outtakes from 1st 7-inch	Release date: 1986; Label: Do The Right Thing Records; Format: 7"	
Eggnog	Release date: 1991; Label: Boner Records; Format: 10", CD	
King Buzzo	Release date: 1992; Label: Boner Records; Format: 12", Compact Disc, Cassette	
Dale Crover	Release date: 1992; Label: Boner Records; Format: 12", CD, Cassette	
Joe Preston	Release date: 1992; Label: Boner Records; Format: 12", CD, Cassette	
Tora Tora Tora	Release date: 1995; Label: X-Mas; Format: 7"	
Smash the State	Release date: Aug 24, 2007; Label: Amphetamine Reptile Records; Format: 7", CD	
Sludge Glamorous	Release date: 2010; Label: From The Nursery; Format: 12"	
Hurray for Me, Fuk You	Release date: 2010; Label: Amphetamine Reptile Records; Format: 12"	
The Bulls & the Bees	Release date: March 13, 2012; Label: Scion A/V; Format: Digital download, CD, 10"	
1983	Release date: 2012; Label: Amphetamine Reptile Records; Format: CD, 10"	
Gaylord	Release date: September 2012; Label: Amphetamine Reptile Records; Format: 7"	
Bride of Crankenstein	Release date: 2014; Label: Amphetamine Reptile Records; Format: 10"	
Beer Hippy	Release date: 2015; Label: Amphetamine Reptile Records; Format: 10"	
Steven McDonald	Release date: Jul 1, 2017; Label: Amphetamine Reptile Records; Format: 12"	
Sabbath	Release date: 2018; Label: Amphetamine Reptile Records; Format: 10", CD	
Escape From LA	Release date: Sep 29, 2019; Label: Amphetamine Reptile Records; Format: CD	
Lord of the Flies	Release date: June 19, 2022; Label: Amphetamine Reptile Records; Format: 10"	

=== Split EPs ===
Title	Details	References
Melvins / Isis (with Isis)	Release date: 2010; Label: Hydra Head Records; Format: 12"	

=== Collaboration EPs ===
Title	Details	References
Hot Fish (with Flipper)	Release date: 2019; Label: Amphetamine Reptile Records; Format: 10", CD	
White Lazy Boy (with Mudhoney)	Release date: 2020; Label: Amphetamine Reptile Records; Format: CD, 10"	

== Live albums ==
Title	Details	References
Your Choice Live Series Vol. 12	Release date: 1991; Label: Your Choice Records; Format: LP	
Alive at the Fucker Club	Release date: 1998; Label: Amphetamine Reptile Records; Format: CD, 10"	
Live at Slim's 8-Track Tape	Release date: 1999; Label: Life Is Abuse Records; Format: 8-track	
Colossus of Destiny	Release date: April 16, 2001; Label: Ipecac Recordings; Format: CD, LP, Digital download	
Millennium Monsterwork 2000 (with Fantômas)	Release date: April 1, 2002; Label: Ipecac Recordings; Format: CD	
A Live History of Gluttony and Lust	Release date: May 16, 2006; Label: Ipecac Recordings; Format: CD, LP, Digital download	
The End	Release date: January 14, 2008; Label: Enturruption; Format: LP, Cassette	
Melvins vs. Minneapolis	Release date: August 2008; Label: Amphetamine Reptile Records, Burlesque of North America; Format: CD	
Pick Your Battles	Release date: 2009; Label: Bifocal Media; Format: CD	
Endless Residency	Release date: May 2011; Label: Amphetamine Reptile Records, Rock Is Hell Records; Format: CD	
Sugar Daddy Live	Release date: May 31, 2011; Label: Ipecac Recordings; Format: CD, Digital download	
Melvins Live at Third Man Records	Release date: September 19, 2013; Label: Third Man Records; Format: LP	

== Compilation albums ==
Title	Details	References
Singles 1–12	Release date: August 26, 1997; Label: Amphetamine Reptile Records; Format: CD, LP	
The Trilogy Vinyl	Release date: February 7, 2000; Label: Ipecac Recordings; Format: LP	
26 Songs	Release date: March 11, 2003; Label: Ipecac Recordings; Format: CD,	
Melvinmania: Best of the Atlantic Years 1993–1996	Release date: September 16, 2003; Label: Atlantic Records; Format: CD	
Neither Here nor There	Release date: March 9, 2004; Label: Ipecac Recordings; Format: CD	
Mangled Demos from 1983	Release date: May 31, 2005; Label: Ipecac Recordings, Alternative Tentacles; Format: CD, 10", Digital download	
Manchild 3: The Making Love Demos	Release date: October 9, 2007; Label: Bifocal Media; Format: CD	
Chicken Switch	Release date: September 29, 2009; Label: Ipecac Recordings; Format: CD	
Ipecac Box Set	Release date: June 1, 2010; Label: Ipecac Recordings; Format: CD	
At The Stake (Complete Atlantic Recordings 1993-1996)	Release date: June 30, 2023; Label: HNE Recordings Ltd, Cherry Red Records; Format: CD	

== Singles ==
List of singles as lead artist, showing year released and album name
Title	Year	Album
"Oven" / "Revulsion"/"We Reach"	1989	Ozma
"With Yo' Heart, Not Yo' Hands"	1990	Non-album single
"Your Blessened"	1990	Bullhead
"Night Goat" (Note: An alternate rendition appears on Houdini.)	1992	Non-album singles
"Love Canal" / "Someday"	1992	Non-album singles
"Sawed Off"	1993	Non-album singles
"Hooch"	1993	Houdini
"Honey Bucket"	1993	Houdini
"Lizzy"	1993	Houdini
"Queen"	1994	Stoner Witch
"Revolve"	1995	Stoner Witch
"Bar-X-the Rocking M"	1996	Stag
"Interstellar Overdrive"	1996	Electroretard
"The Bit"	1996	Stag
"Lexicon Devil" / "Pigtro"	1996	Singles 1–12
"In the Rain" / "Spread Eagle Beagle"	1996	Singles 1–12
"Leech" / "Queen"	1996	Singles 1–12
"Way of the World" / "Theme"	1996	Singles 1–12
"It's Shoved" / "Forgotten Principles"	1996	Singles 1–12
"GGIIBBYY" / "Theresa Screams"	1996	Singles 1–12
"Poison" / "Double Troubled"	1996	Singles 1–12
"Specimen" / "All at Once"	1996	Singles 1–12
"Jacksonville" / "Dallas"	1996	Singles 1–12
"The Bloat" / "Fast Forward"	1996	Singles 1–12
"Nasty Dogs and Funky Kings" / "HDYF"	1996	Singles 1–12
How-++="/"Harry Lauders Walking Stick Tree" / "Zodiac" (Note: Split Single with Brutal Truth.)	1996	Singles 1–12
"Barbaraal²"	1997	Non-album singles
"Spit It Out"	2000	Non-album singles
"Shit Sandwich" / "... and you just took a bite" (Note: Both tracks contain silence.)	2001	Non-album singles
"Black Stooges" / "Foaming (Fast Version)"	2003	Hostile Ambient Takeover
"Dr. Geek" / "Return of the Spiders	2003	Hostile Ambient Takeover
"Little Judas Chongo"	2003	Hostile Ambient Takeover
"The Fool, The Meddling Idiot"	2003	Hostile Ambient Takeover
"The Brain Center at Whipples"	2003	Hostile Ambient Takeover
"Foaming"	2003	Hostile Ambient Takeover
"The Anti-Vermin Seed"	2003	Hostile Ambient Takeover
"Revolve"	2003	Electroretard
"Message Saved" / "Thank You!"	2004	Non-album singles
"PigSkin" / "Starve Already"	2006	Non-album singles
"The Star-Spangled Banner"	2008	Non-album singles
"War Pussy" / "Hideous Women"	2016	Basses Loaded
"Christ Hammer"	2017	A Walk With Love and Death
"What's Wrong With You?"	2017	A Walk With Love and Death
"Stop Moving to Florida"	2018	Pinkus Abortion Technician
"Embrace the Rub"	2018	Pinkus Abortion Technician
"Rebel Girl" (featuring Teri Gender Bender)	2019	Non-album single
"I Fuck Around" / "Bouncing Rick"	2020	Working with God
"Brian, The Horse-Faced Goon"	2020	Working with God
"Caddy Daddy"	2021	Working with God
"The Great Good Place"	2021	Working with God
"Fuck You"	2021	Working with God
"Night Goat (Acoustic)"	2021	Five Legged Dog
"Pitfalls in Serving Warrants (Acoustic)"	2021	Five Legged Dog
"Revolve (acoustic)"	2021	Five Legged Dog
"Sway (acoustic)"	2021	Five Legged Dog
"Working the Ditch"	2024	Tarantula Heart
"Allergic to Food"	2024	Tarantula Heart
"Victory of the Pyramids"	2025	Thunderball
"King Of Rome"	2025	Thunderball
"Tossing Coins into the Fountain of Fuck" (With Napalm Death)	2026	Savage Imperial Death March
"Rip the God" (With Napalm Death)	2026	Savage Imperial Death March

=== Split Singles ===
List of split singles, showing year released and artist name
Title	Year	Other artist	References
"Hate the Police" / "Symptom of the Universe"	1989	Mudhoney	
"Sweet Young Thing Ain't Sweet No More" / "I Dreamed, I Dream"	1989	Steel Pole Bathtub	
"Here She Comes Now" / "Venus in Furs"	1991	Nirvana	
"I Can't Shake It" / "Some Girls"	1998	Cosmic Psychos	
"Black Betty" (Note: Both bands preform the same track.)	2011	Jon Spencer Blues Explosion	
"Alleged" / "The Bloat"	2012	Unsane	

== Videography ==
=== Videos ===
Title	Details	References
Salad of a Thousand Delights	Release date: 1992; Label: Box Dog Video; Format: VHS, DVD	
Live from London 2006 (With Fantômas)	Release date: August 26, 2008; Label: Ipecac Recordings; Format: DVD	
Across the USA in 51 Days: The Movie!	Release date: November 27, 2015; Label: Ipecac Recordings; Format: DVD	

=== Music videos ===
Date of Release	Song	Album	References
1992	"With Teeth"	Lysol	
1993	"Hooch"	Houdini	
1993	"Honey Bucket"	Houdini	
1993	"Lizzy"	Houdini	
1994	"Queen"	Stoner Witch	
1994	"Revolve"	Stoner Witch	
1996	"Bar-X-The Rocking M"	Stag	
1997	"Mombius Hibachi"	Honky	
2006	"The Talking Horse"	(A) Senile Animal	
2009	"The Kicking Machine" (Pitchfork TV)	Nude with Boots	
2010	"Electric Flower"	The Bride Screamed Murder	
2012	"The War on Wisdom"	The Bulls & the Bees	
2014	"Warhead" (Venom cover)	Everybody Loves Sausages	
2016	"Hideous Woman"	Basses Loaded	
2018	"Embrace The Rub"	Pinkus Abortion Technician	
2018	"Don't Forget To Breath"	Pinkus Abortion Technician	
2024	"Working The Ditch"	Tarantula Heart	

== Other contributions ==
Date of Release	Title	Song or songs	Label	Catalog number	References
1984	Let's Together (various artists)	If You Get Bored	K Records		
1984	Let's Kiss (various artists)	At a Crawl	K Records		
1986	Deep Six (various artists)	Scared, Blessing the Operation, Grinding Process & She Waits	C/Z Records	CZ001	
1989	Peace Through Chemistry (various artists)	Glow God, Big as a Mountain & Heavyness of the Load	Alchemy Records	001LP	
1990	Dope Guns And Fucking in the Streets Volumes 4–7 (various artists)	Euthanasia	Amphetamine Reptile Records	AmRep 008	
1990	Hard to Believe: Kiss Covers Compilation (various artists)	God of Thunder	C/Z Records	CZ024	
1991	It's Your Choice (various artists)	It's Shoved (live)	Your Choice Records	YC-LS 013	
1991	Kill Rock Stars (various artists)	Ever Since My Accident	Kill Rock Stars	KRS 201	
1992	Mesomorph Enduros (various artists)	Vile	Big Cat Records	ABB36	
1992	International Pop Underground Convention (various artists)	Charmicarmicat	K Records	KLP11	
1993	Advanced Alternative Media Vol.1 (various artists)	At a Crawl	Advanced Alternative Media		
1993	Gimme Indie Rock Vol.1 (various artists)	Creepy Smell	K-Tel Records	6453	
1993	CMJ New Music No. 3 (various artists)	Hooch	CMJ	CMJOCT93	
1994	13 Years of Losing Money (various artists)	Hag Me & Sacrifice	Gasatanka	DEI6105-7-DEI6109-7	
1995	Tales From The Crypt Presents: Demon Knight (various artists)	Instant Larry	Atlantic Records	82725-2	
1995	AmRep Motors 1995 Models (various artists)	Larry	Amphetamine Reptile Records	AmRep 098 (USA), ARR 62/005 (Europe)	
August 27, 1996	A Small Circle of Friends (various artists)	Lexicon Devil	Grass Records	60150-13038-2	
1997	Mind The Gap Volume 14 (various artists)	In the Freaktose the Bugs Are Dying	Gonzo Circus	GC020	
1997	Alternative Distribution Alliance Monthly Sampler 5/97 (various artists)	Lovely Butterfly	Alternative Distribution Alliance	ADA20007	
1998	Great Jewish Music: Marc Bolan (various artists)	Buick MacKane	Tzadik Records	TZ 7126	
1999	Mind the Gap Volume 27 (various artists)	Amazon	Gonzo Circus	GC033	
1999	Cinema Beer Belly (various artists)	Mombius Hiabachi	Hopeless Records	CD and DVD	
2000	Runnin' On Fumes! (various artists)	I Can't Shake It	Gearhead	RPM 011	
2000	Troma's Terror Firmer (various artists) (soundtrack)	Horn Bearer	Go-Kart Records		
2000	Live @ Bob's Garage Vol. 1 (various artists)	Revolve	KISW	31889162	
July 25, 2006	Suicide Squeeze: Slaying Since 1996 (various artists)	With Teeth	Suicide Squeeze Records		
2006	Sleepless in Seattle: The Birth of Grunge (various artists)	Grinding Process	LiveWire Recordings	LWR-1012	
2010	Godlike 2010 by KMFDM	Godlike (Security Forces Mix)	KMFDM Records	KMFDM032	
