= Neither Here nor There (book) =

Greatest hits album / Artbook by Melvins
- Released: March 9, 2004
- Recorded: 1983–2002
- Genre: Sludge metal
- Label: Ipecac

Melvins chronology
Melvinmania: Best of the Atlantic Years 1993–1996 (2003)	Neither Here nor There (2004)	Pigs of the Roman Empire (2004)

Neither Here nor There is a retrospective artbook by the Melvins, which was released in 2004 through Ipecac Recordings to celebrate their 20th anniversary. The book consists of 228 pages of art, photos, essays, stories and liner notes by a variety of contributors including Dalek, Camille Rose Garcia, Alex Grey, Tom Hazelmyer, Adam Jones, Frank Kozik, Mackie Osborne, the late Stanisław Szukalski, Greg Werckman and many others. It also contains a band picked best-of CD.

The book has gone out-of-print. It was available in a limited hardcover edition and a softcover edition.

== Track listing ==
No.	Title	Length
1.	"Bar-X-the Rocking M (Stag)"	2:24
2.	"Night Goat (AmRep single)"	6:06
3.	"Hog Leg (Eggnog)"	3:21
4.	"The Fool, the Meddling Idiot (Hostile Ambient Takeover)"	7:49
5.	"Revolve (Stoner Witch)"	4:45
6.	"Colossus of Destiny"	0:31
7.	"Manky (The Maggot)"	5:53
8.	"Oven (Ozma)"	1:28
9.	"With Teeth (Lysol)"	2:25
10.	"If You Get Bored (Let's Together comp. from K Records)"	1:29
11.	"Let It All Be (The Bootlicker)"	10:47
12.	"Boris (Bullhead)"	8:32
13.	"Forgotten Principles (Mangled Demos from 1983)"	1:06
14.	"Prick"	0:32
15.	"Mombius Hibachi (Honky)"	1:55
16.	"At a Crawl (Let's Kiss comp. from K Records)"	2:56
17.	"Hooch (Houdini)"	2:52
18.	"Eye Flys (Gluey Porch Treatments & Colossus of Destiny)"	10:51

== Partial band personnel ==
- Buzz Osborne – guitar, vocals
- Dale Crover – drums, vocals
- Kevin Rutmanis – bass (4, 7, 11, 18)

with

- Mark Deutrom – bass (1, 5, 15)
- Dirty Walt – valve trombone (1)
- Mac Mann – organ & grand piano (1)
- Joe Preston – bass (2, 9)
- Lori "Lorax" Black – bass (3, 8, 12)
- Matt Lukin – bass (10, 13, 16, 18)
- Mike Dillard – drums (13)
- Adam Jones – guitar (18)
