= Mackie Osborne =

American artist

- Born: United States
- Known for: Album artwork, graphic design
- Notable work: Lateralus (Tool), Stoner Witch (Melvins), California (Mr. Bungle)
- Spouse: Buzz Osborne

Mackie Osborne is an American artist responsible for the design and illustrations of many music albums since the 1980s. She is a member of the band Fleabag and has contributed to many albums on packaging artwork, layout design and art direction.

Being the wife of Melvins frontman Buzz Osborne, she also designed the artwork for most of the band's albums since 1994. She has also been in various Melvins-related bands and side projects, such as Get Hustle (which featured Melvins 2000–2001 rhythm guitarist and 2006 tour bassist David Scott Stone) and Gashley Snub (which also featured David Scott Stone and Melvins drummer Dale Crover).

== Artwork ==
Year	Artist	Title
1980	Circle Jerks	Group Sex
1982	Circle Jerks	Wild in the Streets
1992	Social Distortion	Somewhere Between Heaven and Hell
1994	various	Fast Track to Nowhere
1994	Rancid	Let's Go
1994	Melt-Banana	Cactuses Come in Flocks
1994	Melvins	Prick
1994	Melvins	Stoner Witch
1995	All	Pummel
1995	The Offspring	Re-release of debut album on Epitaph
1995	The Vandals	Live Fast, Diarrhea
1995	Melvins	Tora Tora Tora
1995	Social Distortion	Mainliner: Wreckage From the Past
1995	Wayne Kramer	The Hard Stuff
1996	Assorted Jelly Beans	Assorted Jelly Beans
1996	various	Jabberjaw Compilation, Vol. 2: Pure Sweet Hell
1996	The Vandals	The Quickening
1996	Melvins	Stag
1997	The Jelly Roll Kings	Off Yonder Wall
1997	Junior Kimbrough	Most Things Haven't Worked Out
1997	lowercase	Kill the Lights
1997	The Neckbones	Souls on Fire
1997	various	Flyin' Traps
1998	The Vandals	Hitler Bad, Vandals Good
1999	The Vandals	Play Really Bad Original Country Tunes
1999	Melvins	The Maggot
1999	Melvins	The Bootlicker
1999	Mr. Bungle	California
1999	Oingo Boingo	Anthology
2000	Melvins	The Crybaby
2000	The Moonlighters	Dreamland
2000	Tool	Salival
2001	Melvins	Colossus of Destiny
2001	Tool	Lateralus
2002	Bad Religion	The Process of Belief
2002	Melvins/Fantômas	Millennium Monsterwork 2000
2002	Melvins	Hostile Ambient Takeover
2003	Melvins	26 Songs
2003	Melvins	Melvinmania: Best of the Atlantic Years 1993–1996
2003	Mondo Generator	A Drug Problem That Never Existed
2003	Pink Anvil	Halloween Party
2003	Tricky	Vulnerable
2004	Joanneh Nagler	I Burn
2004	Melvins	Pigs of the Roman Empire
2004	Melvins	Neither Here Nor There
2004	Trevor Dunn's Trio-Convulsant	Sister Phantom Owl Fish
2004	Melvins/Jello Biafra	Never Breathe What You Can't See
2004	Vincent & Mr. Green	Vincent & Mr. Green
2005	Melvins	Mangled Demos from 1983
2005	Melvins/Jello Biafra	Sieg Howdy!
2005	Altamont	The Monkee's Uncle
2006	East West Blast Test	Popular Music for Unpopular People
2006	Melvins	A Live History of Gluttony and Lust
2006	Melvins	(A) Senile Animal
2006	Tool	10,000 Days
2007	Goon Moon	Licker's Last Leg
2008	Nerd Table	Aqua Vulva
2008	Melvins	Nude With Boots
2008	Broken.Heart.Collector	Strange Fruits
2009	MadLove	White With Foam
2010	Melvins	The Bride Screamed Murder
2010	Melvins	Melvins (13-CD box set)
2011	Melvins	Sugar Daddy Live
