= Chicken Switch =

Remix album by Melvins and Various Artists
- Released: September 29, 2009
- Genre: Sludge metal, experimental, noise, plunderphonics
- Label: Ipecac

Melvins chronology
Live from London 2006 (2008)	Chicken Switch (2009)	The Bride Screamed Murder (2010)

Professional ratings
Review scores
Source	Rating
AllMusic	3/5 stars
Drowned In Sound	(6/10)
Fangoria	2/4 stars
Pitchfork Media	(7.8/10)

Chicken Switch is a Melvins remix album by various noise and experimental artists, released on September 29, 2009. Unlike usual remix albums where the remixer is given a single track to work with, for Chicken Switch each remixer was given a full album to work with and pull from to create their track (and in some cases, more than one full album was used as source material). The song names were also newly selected by their remixer.

== Track listing ==
No.	Title	Music	Source album(s)	Length
1.	"Washmachine Sk8tronics"	Eye Yamatsuka	Hostile Ambient Takeover	5:09
2.	"Emperor Twaddle Reemix"	Christoph Heemann	Honky	4:20
3.	"She Chokes Her Dying Breath and Does It In my Face"	V/Vm	26 Songs	4:24
4.	"AAHHH..."	John Duncan	Lysol, The Bootlicker	5:02
5.	"Linkshänder"	Matmos	Gluey Porch Treatments	5:12
6.	"EggNog Trilogy i) She's Ivanhoe ii) Cancer iii) Inebriated"	Lee Ranaldo	Eggnog	4:24
7.	"SNOW REM REM IBVZ"	Merzbow	Stag	5:56
8.	"Prick Concrete/Revolution M"	David Scott Stone	Prick	3:23
9.	"Queen (Electroclash Remix)"	The Panacea	Stoner Witch	4:40
10.	"The Silky Apple Butter of Youth"	Sunroof!	Ozma	3:12
11.	"4th Floor Hellcopter"	Kawabata Makoto	Bullhead	5:06
12.	"disp_tx_skel_mach_murx"	Farmers Manual	Gluey Porch Treatments	5:06
13.	"Overgoat"	Void Manes	Houdini, Prick, Stag, Ozma, Hostile Ambient Takeover	4:35
14.	"Over from Under the Dog, Girl & Boy Treatment"	RLW	Gluey Porch Treatments	4:04
15.	"Hard Revenge Milly Bloody Battle VS. The Melvins Ozmatized Gore Police (Feat. Cardopusher of the Five Deadly Venoms)"	Speedranch	Ozma	5:15
16.	"Punch the Limo (mp3 bonus track)"	Hiro Noodles	King Buzzo, Hostile Ambient Takeover, and other albums	3:04
