= Five Legged Dog =

Studio album by Melvins
- Released: October 15, 2021
- Length: 149:33
- Label: Ipecac
- Producer: Melvins

Melvins chronology
Working with God (2021)	Five Legged Dog (2021)	Bad Mood Rising (2022)

Singles from Five Legged Dog
- 1. "Night Goat (Acoustic)" Released: July 22 2021; 2. "Pitfalls in Serving Warrants (Acoustic)" Released: August 17 2021; 3. "Revolve (acoustic)" Released: September 14 2021; 4. "Sway (acoustic)" Released: October 6 2021

Professional ratings
Aggregate scores
Source	Rating
Metacritic	75/100
Review scores
Source	Rating
Blabbermouth.net	8/10
Classic Rock Germany	7/10
Gaffa Denmark	4/6 stars
HUMO	4/5 stars

Five Legged Dog is the 25th studio album by American rock band Melvins, released on October 15, 2021, through Ipecac Recordings. It contains acoustic versions of songs that appeared on earlier albums and is the first acoustic album released by the band.

== Track listing ==
Disc one
No.	Title	Original version on	Length
1.	"Edgar the Elephant"	A Walk with Love & Death	3:30
2.	"Up the Dumper"	The Bootlicker	2:12
3.	"Hung Bunny / Roman Dog Bird"	Lysol	12:33
4.	"Hooch"	Houdini	2:37
5.	"Billy Fish"	Nude With Boots	4:08
6.	"Shevil"	Stoner Witch	5:13
7.	"Charlie"	(Redd Kross cover)	2:07
8.	"A Growing Disgust"	Freak Puke	4:56
9.	"Eye Flys / Woman"	Gluey Porch Treatments / (Free cover)	8:17
10.	"Pitfalls in Serving Warrants"	Honky	2:48
11.	"Outside Chance"	(The Turtles cover)	2:11
12.	"Evil New War God"	The Bride Screamed Murder	4:34
13.	"The Bloated Pope"	Pigs of the Roman Empire	3:52
14.	"Bad Move"	The Fickle Finger of Fate (Dale Crover solo album)	3:27
15.	"With Teeth"	Lysol	2:44
16.	"Halo of Flies"	Sieg Howdy! (Alice Cooper cover)	8:22

Disc two
No.	Title	Original version on	Length
17.	"Oven"	Ozma	1:54
18.	"Sway"	(Rolling Stones cover)	3:09
19.	"Anaconda"	Bullhead	2:49
20.	"Lovely Butterflies"	Honky	2:58
21.	"Boris"	Bullhead	6:56
22.	"It's Shoved"	Bullhead	2:40
23.	"Honey Bucket"	Houdini	2:54
24.	"We Are Doomed"	The Bulls & The Bees	6:48
25.	"Fly Paper"	(Brainiac cover)	2:27
26.	"Let God Be Your Gardener"	Ozma	2:11
27.	"At the Stake"	Stoner Witch	1:39
28.	"Night Goat"	Houdini	6:05
29.	"Queen"	Stoner Witch	2:42
30.	"Everybody's Talking"	(Harry Nilsson cover)	2:45
31.	"Revolve"	Stoner Witch	3:51
32.	"Suicide in Progress"	Nude With Boots	2:54
33.	"Prig"	The Bootlicker	1:50
34.	"The Bit"	Stag	5:15
35.	"Civilized Worm"	(A) Senile Animal	6:43
36.	"Don't Forget to Breathe"	Pinkus Abortion Technician	7:32

== Personnel ==
Melvins

- King Buzzo – vocals, acoustic guitar, sitar; photos
- Dale Crover – vocals, drums
- Steven McDonald – vocals, acoustic bass

Additional musicians

- Jeff Pinkus – lead vocals and banjo (track 30, 36)
- Camilla Saufley – backup vocals (track 18, 35)
- Bob Hannam – backup vocals (track 5, 17); photos

Production

- Toshi Kasai – engineer, mixing
- John Golden – mastering
- Mackie Osborne – artwork

== Charts ==
Chart performance for Five Legged Dog
Chart (2022)	Peak position
German Albums (Offizielle Top 100)	48
