= Electroretard =

Studio album by Melvins
- Released: February 6, 2001
- Recorded: 1996, 2000–2001
- Genres: Sludge metal; psychedelic rock; punk rock
- Length: 42:23
- Label: Man's Ruin
- Producers: Tim Green, Joe Barresi

Melvins chronology
The Crybaby (2000)	Electroretard (2001)	Colossus of Destiny (2001)

Singles from Electroretard
- 1. "Interstellar Overdrive" Released: 1996; 2. "Revolve" Released: 2003

Professional ratings
Review scores
Source	Rating
AllMusic	3/5 stars
Brave Words & Bloody Knuckles	6/10

Electroretard is the thirteenth album by the Melvins, which was released in 2001 through Man's Ruin Records. The album contains an experiment in backmasking ("Shit Storm"), three covers, and four reworked versions of old Melvins songs. Although released on CD, it was going to see an LP release, but Man's Ruin closed beforehand. It was later re-issued on June 2, 2015, together with The Bulls & the Bees EP via Ipecac Recordings.

== Track listing ==
Electroretard track listing
No.	Title	Writer(s)	Length
1.	"Shit Storm"	Melvins	4:06
2.	"Youth of America"	Sage	9:16
3.	"Gluey Porch Treatments"	Osborne	0:47
4.	"Revolve"	Deutrom, Osborne	4:20
5.	"Missing"	Cows	4:09
6.	"Lovely Butterflies"	Melvins	6:02
7.	"Tipping the Lion"	Osborne	3:47
8.	"Interstellar Overdrive"	Barrett, Mason, Waters, Wright	9:49
Total length:			42:23

== Track information ==
1. "Shit Storm" – The song "Revolve" from Stoner Witch reversed with added effects and drums. The version used was from Stoner Witch and not the version found on this release. Samples of other Melvins songs put in reverse can be heard as well. On the re-issue, the track has been shortened drastically.
2. "Youth of America" – Wipers cover. Later released on the 2010 12" EP "Sludge Glamorous"
3. "Gluey Porch Treatments" – Re-recording of the song "Gluey Porch Treatments" from Gluey Porch Treatments.
4. "Revolve" – Remake of the song from Stoner Witch. Later released as a single with a live version of "With Teeth".
5. "Missing" – Cows cover. The song was later released on vinyl as a 7" split with Hepa-Titus in 2014.
6. "Lovely Butterflies" – Re-recording of the song from Honky.
7. "Tipping the Lion" – Remix of the song from Stag. Previously released on the Interstellar Overdrive 10".
8. "Interstellar Overdrive" – Pink Floyd cover. Previously released on the Interstellar Overdrive 10".

== Personnel ==
- Buzz Osborne – vocals, guitar and RMS 2000
- Dale Crover – drums, backing vocals, organ and RMS 2000
- Kevin Rutmanis – bass guitar, backing vocals, slide bass, string arrangement and RMS 2000
- Mark Deutrom – bass guitar (tracks 7 & 8; credited on re-release)

=== Additional personnel ===
- Tim Green – engineer (tracks 1–6)
- Michael Rozon – mixing (tracks 1–6)
- Joe Barresi – engineer & mixing (tracks 7–8)
- John Golden – mastering
- Frank Kozik – artwork
