= Thunderball (Melvins 1983 album) =

Studio album by Melvins
- Released: April 18, 2025
- Studio: Sound of Sirens
- Genres: Sludge metal; alternative metal; doom metal
- Length: 34:03
- Label: Ipecac
- Producers: Toshi Kasai; King Buzzo

Melvins chronology
Tarantula Heart (2024)	Thunderball (2025)

Singles from Thunderball
- 1. "Victory of the Pyramids" Released: February 18, 2025; 2. "King Of Rome" Released: 2025

Thunderball is the twenty-eighth studio album by American rock band Melvins, under the alias Melvins 1983. It was released on April 18, 2025, by Ipecac Recordings in CD, vinyl, and digital formats.

== Background ==
The album, succeeding the band's 2024 album, Tarantula Heart, was announced in February 2025 with Savage Imperial Death March, a collaboration with Napalm Death. It is the band's third album under the name "Melvins 1983", featuring two of the band's initial members, Buzz Osborne and Mike Dillard, alongside Atlanta electronic musicians Bristolian Ni Maîtres and Void Manes. The album's lead single, "Victory of the Pyramids", was released on February 18, 2025. Dillard described the song as a "lovely blend of beautiful noise and gut-busting grooves".

== Reception ==
Professional ratings
Aggregate scores
Source	Rating
Metacritic	78/100
Review scores
Source	Rating
AllMusic	3.5/5 stars
Blabbermouth	8/10 stars
Kerrang!	4/5 stars
Louder Than War	4.5/5 stars
Punknews.org	4/5 stars
Sputnikmusic	3.5/5 stars

Thunderball received positive reviews from critics. At Metacritic, which assigns a normalized rating out of 100 to reviews from mainstream critics, the album received an average score of 78 based on eight reviews, indicating "generally favorable reviews".

Mark Deming of AllMusic wrote in his review of Thunderball, "After over four decades, the Melvins still sound utterly uncompromised and full of swampy vigor, and Thunderball confirms they haven't finished challenging themselves or their audience, not by a long shot." Ultimate Classic Rock remarked, "Despite Manes and Maires' additions, Thunderball is undoubtedly a Melvins record, as persistent, uncompromising and victorious as anything they've done over the past 40 years."

Olly Thomas of Kerrang! gave the album a rating of four out of five and stated, "Ironically, though, aside from the ominous interlude that is Vomit Of Clarity, Thunderball includes some of the most irresistible, huge-sounding tunes Melvins have delivered in a while." Sputnikmusic's Miloslaw Rugallini wrote that "Thunderball would greatly benefit from another 10 or 20 minutes worth of mid-to-low tempo grooves to grant their now-besotted audience a chance to sway like sluggish Evangelicals in a primal stupor".

Sean Millard of Louder Than War assigned the album a rating of 4.5 out of five, noting "I think that Thunderball establishes a new bar for Melvins to beat. Far from being in the twilight of their career, this one feels like it might just be their Best shot at a new dawn." Blabbermouth, comparing the album to Tarantula Heart, described it as "cut from the same cloth, but with an even greater dedication to gnarly, doomed-out riffing, and a woozy, psychedelic streak a mile wide," and rated it eight out of ten.

== Track listing ==
All tracks are written by King Buzzo except "Vomit of Clarity" (written by Void Manes and Ni Maîtres).

Thunderball track listing
No.	Title	Length
1.	"King of Rome"	3:09
2.	"Vomit of Clarity"	2:03
3.	"Short Hair with a Wig"	11:05
4.	"Victory of the Pyramids"	9:36
5.	"Venus Blood"	8:10
Total length:		34:03

== Personnel ==
Credits adapted from the album's liner notes.

=== Melvins 1983 ===
- King Buzzo – guitar, bass, vocals, production
- Mike Dillard – drums

=== Additional contributors ===
- Toshi Kasai – production, recording, mixing
- Void Manes – noise, creepy machine vocals
- Ni Maîtres – noise, upright bass, hand gestures
- John Golden – mastering
- Mackie Osborne – design

== Charts ==
Chart performance for Thunderball
Chart (2025)	Peak position
Scottish Albums (Official Charts)	64
UK Album Downloads (Official Charts)	79
UK Independent Albums (Official Charts)	19
UK Rock & Metal Albums (Official Charts)	6
