= Tora Tora Tora (album) =

EP by Melvins
- Released: 1995
- Recorded: 1995
- Genre: Sludge metal
- Label: X-Mas

Melvins chronology
Stoner Witch (1994)	Tora Tora Tora (1995)	Stag (1996)

Tora Tora Tora is a special release EP by the Melvins, released in 1995 on X-Mas Records. It chronicles their trials and tribulations on some of their arena tours dealing with the fans of the larger bands they were touring with.

== Track listing ==
No.	Title	Length
1.	"Revolve"
2.	"Skweetis / With Teeth / White Zombie Ad"
3.	"Night Goat / Specimen"
4.	"Specimen/Concert Warning"
5.	"KISW Interview / Hooch / Queen"
6.	"Johnny Reno Gunfighter / Oven / Goose Freight Train"
7.	"Goggles / Sweet Willy Rollbar"
8.	"Radio Interview / Roadbull"

== Personnel ==
as written in the package

- Dale "Shakes" Crover - Drums, Backing Vocals, Gloves
- Mark "Grumpy Cowboy" Deutrom - Electric Bass Guitar, Backing Vocals, Hats
- King "Asshole Edward" Buzzo - Electric Guitar, Vocals, Dirty Clothes
