= Alchemy Records =

Alchemy Records is the name of three different record labels:

- Alchemy Records (U.S.), based in San Francisco
- Alchemy Records (Japan), based in Osaka
- Alchemy Records (UK), based in London
