= Melvinmania: Best of the Atlantic Years 1993–1996 =

Melvinmania: The Best of the Atlantic Years 1993–1996

Greatest hits album by Melvins
- Released: September 16, 2003
- Recorded: Various
- Genre: Sludge metal
- Length: 45:23
- Label: Atlantic
- Producer: Carlos Anaia

Melvins chronology
Hostile Ambient Takeover (2002)	Melvinmania: The Best of the Atlantic Years 1993–1996 (2003)	Neither Here Nor There (2004)

Professional ratings
Review scores
Source	Rating
AllMusic	4/5 stars

Melvinmania: The Best of the Atlantic Years 1993–1996 is an album by Melvins, which was released in 2003 through Atlantic Records (UK). Tracks 1–5 are taken from the 1993 Houdini album. Tracks 6–10 are taken from the 1994 Stoner Witch album. Tracks 11–15 are taken from the 1996 Stag album.

The liner notes are at times incorrect, for example: "... their old pal Cobain produced (...) and played drums on a number of the tracks ..." Cobain only played additional percussion on "Spread Eagle Beagle" (Houdini). This album was not sanctioned by the band.

== Track listing ==
1. "Hooch" (Melvins) – 2:53
2. "Lizzy" (Melvins) – 4:47
3. "Honey Bucket" (Melvins) – 2:44
4. "Set Me Straight" (Melvins) – 2:27
5. "Pearl Bomb" (Melvins) – 2:49
6. "Queen" (Crover/Osborne) – 3:09
7. "Sweet Willy Rollbar" (Osborne) – 1:30
8. "Revolve" (Deutrom/Osborne) – 4:45
9. "Roadbull" (Crover/Deutrom/Osborne) – 3:27
10. "June Bug" (Deutrom/Osborne) – 2:02
11. "The Bit" (Crover/Osborne) – 4:45
12. "Bar-X-the Rocking M" (Crover/Deutrom/Osborne) – 2:25
13. "Tipping the Lion" (Osborne) – 3:30
14. "Black Bock" (Osborne) – 2:44
15. "Berthas" (Osborne) – 1:24

== Enhanced music videos ==
- "Honey Bucket"
- "Revolve"
- "Bar-X-the Rocking M"

== Personnel ==
- Dale C – drums
- King B – vocals, Guitar
- Lorax – Bass on tracks 1–5
- Mark D – Bass on tracks 6–15
