= Dale Crover =

American drummer (born 1967)

- Crover performing with Melvins in 2023

Background information
- Born: October 23, 1967 (age 59)
- Origin: Aberdeen, Washington, U.S.
- Genres: Sludge metal; grunge; hardcore punk; experimental rock; alternative metal; doom metal; stoner metal
- Occupation: Musician
- Instruments: Drums; guitar; bass; vocals
- Member of: Melvins; Altamont; Men of Porn; Redd Kross; Sleep
- Formerly of: Acid King; Honky; Fecal Matter; Hank Williams III; Nirvana; Shrinebuilder; Crystal Fairy

Dale Crover (born October 23, 1967) is an American rock musician. He is best known as the drummer for Melvins and has also been the drummer for Men of Porn, Shrinebuilder, Crystal Fairy and, for a brief time, Nirvana. He is also guitarist and vocalist for Altamont. He has toured with Fantômas (filling in for Dave Lombardo), Off!, and Redd Kross. In 2016, Rolling Stone listed him as the 69th greatest drummer of all time.

== Biography ==
Melvins recruited Crover on drums in 1984 from an Iron Maiden cover band, following original drummer Mike Dillard's departure. Crover has been one of the two constant members of the Melvins, along with frontman Buzz Osborne, and is the only band member besides Osborne to appear on all their studio albums. In late 1985, Crover played bass in Fecal Matter, a band he formed with Kurt Cobain and Greg Hokanson. After Hokanson left the band, Cobain and Crover recorded Illiteracy Will Prevail on a 4-track on Easter 1986 at Cobain's aunt's home in Burien, Washington. Crover played bass and drums on the demo. "Spank Thru" from this demo appears on the Nirvana album Sliver: The Best of the Box. Fecal Matter disbanded in 1986.

Crover drummed on Nirvana's ten-song demo recorded January 23, 1988, at Reciprocal Recording Studios in Seattle. Nine of these songs have been officially released:

- "Floyd the Barber", "Paper Cuts", and "Downer" – Bleach
- "Beeswax", "Downer", "Hairspray Queen", "Mexican Seafood", and "Aero Zeppelin" – Incesticide
- "If You Must" and "Pen Cap Chew" – With the Lights Out

The original incarnation of Nirvana including Crover on drums played a 14-song show in Tacoma, Washington, on the night of the same day that they did the demo session. Three cuts from the show – "Downer", "Floyd the Barber", and "Raunchola"/"Moby Dick" – appear on With the Lights Out. Later in 1988, Crover and Melvins' bandmate Buzz Osborne relocated to San Francisco, California. Crover recommended Grays Harbor area drummer Dave Foster before he left. Foster played one show with Nirvana before being fired and replaced by Chad Channing. Crover briefly rejoined Nirvana during a short west-coast tour with Sonic Youth in August 1990. In April 1991, Crover played drums on a demo version of "Drain You" with Cobain on guitar and vocals and Dave Grohl on bass guitar.

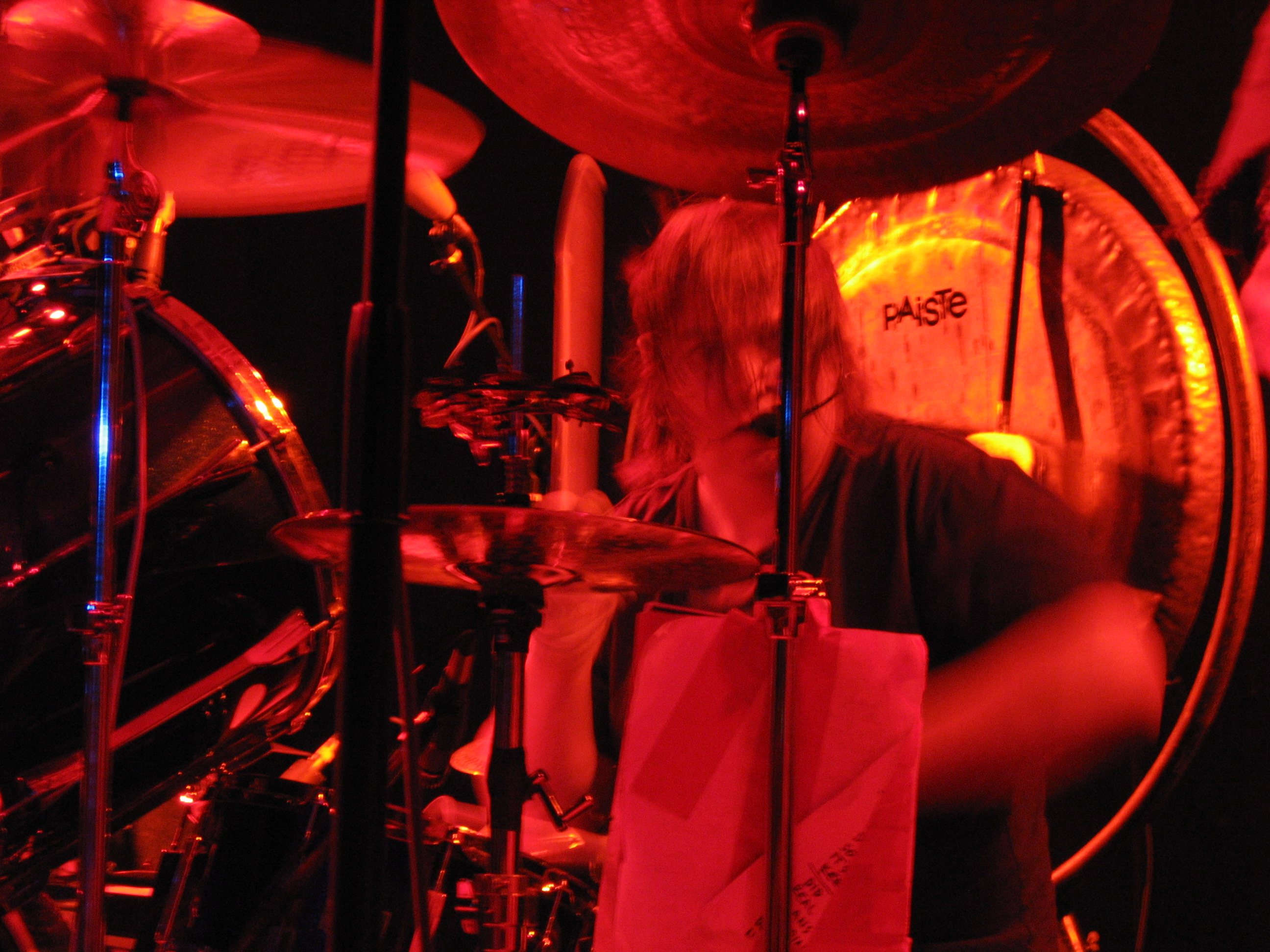
Crover performing in 2006

In the years 1993 and 1994 the Melvins played a tour visiting every state in the contiguous United States, and released their first record on a major label (Atlantic) which had been nominally produced by Kurt Cobain, toured with Nirvana on the first leg of their world tour for In Utero, and then played a later leg of the tour that ended up including the last shows that Nirvana ever played. The Melvins opened for Nirvana at what turned out to be their final show in Munich after Cobain's overdose in Rome and shortly before his death. Prior to Cobain's departure for what wound up to be a short stint in rehab, the Melvins had several other shows scheduled to open for Nirvana in Europe. When these shows were canceled, the Melvins 'took their Nirvana money' to book studio time in London. They recorded two of their best-remembered albums in one week: Stoner Witch, and Prick. The album released as Prick was originally intended to appear under the title Kurdt Cobain, but this idea was shelved after Cobain's suicide. During the same year, Crover founded the band Altamont with Joey Osbourne and Dan Southwick of Acid King. He produced and performed additional vocals on Acid King's début release that year. During this time he was also married to Acid King's frontwoman Lori S., but they divorced. When Nirvana was inducted into the Rock and Roll Hall of Fame in April 2014, although not officially inducted with the band, Crover was singled out for his work with them during Crover's successor Dave Grohl's acceptance speech. A high proportion of the most substantive and historically informative entries in Kurt Cobain's published journals consist of unfinished letters that he started writing to Dale Crover.

It may be significant to point out that after Cobain's death and the waning of grunge rock's centrality in the popular culture of the 1990's, Crover's career with Buzz Osborne in the Melvins, though they started playing together a decade earlier in 1984, had still scarcely begun in 1994. The volume and influence of the music that they produced thereafter has only grown over time. Since 1994, the Melvins have released nearly thirty studio albums and twenty EPs while continuing to tour relentlessly since that time. They played with Nine Inch Nails on the Downward Spiral tour in 1995, and on a later tour with Tool they both opened and played as additional personnel with the headlining band after opening for them. They toured with Faith No More and with the legendary, seminal punk musician Jello Biafra of the Dead Kennedys while also putting out a collaborative album with him, and playing guitars and drums during the Dead Kennedys sets during the tour. Their collaboration with Lustmord on the Pigs of the Roman Empire is perhaps lesser known, but much cherished by fans. Crover is credited as the drummer on most of the tracks on Mike Patton's Peeping Tom project from 2006. The Melvins also play with Patton on the Fantomas records and have contributed to various other Patton projects. Crover is credited on nearly 400 releases according to Discogs.

He has released three LPs as a solo artist includingThe Fickle Finger of Fate and Rat-a-Tat-Tat. In the summer of 2024, he released Glossolalia on Joyful Noise Recordings with musical guests including Tom Waits, Ty Segall, Kim Thayil and Rob Crow. Crover has also released a number of other one-off projects at Joyful Noise including the percussion project Hew Time, which enlisted the drummers Coady Willis (of Big Business) and Joe Plummer (of Modest Mouse).

== Appearances ==
Dale Crover made an appearance in Neil Young's video "Harvest Moon" playing Neil Young. This was largely due to his physical resemblance to the younger Young.

Cartoon versions of Crover and bandmate Osborne appear in an episode of Uncle Grandpa as well.

== Discography ==
| Date of release | Title | Label | Credited for | Catalog number |
|---|---|---|---|---|
| 1994 | Acid King: Acid King | Sympathy for the Record Industry | Additional vocals | |
| 1996 | Dale Crover: Drumb | Man's Ruin Records | Performer | |
| September 7, 1999 | Hank Williams III: Risin' Outlaw | Curb Records | drums on "Cocaine Blues" | |
| October 19, 2004 | Men of Porn: Wine, Women and Song | Small Stone Records | drums | SS-047 |
| October 2009 | Shrinebuilder: Shrinebuilder | Neurot Recordings | drums | NR070 |
| February 2015 | Conan Neutron & the Secret Friends: The Enemy of Everyone | Seismic Wave Entertainment | drums | SW013 |
| May 2016 | Conan Neutron & the Secret Friends: The Art of Murder | Seismic Wave Entertainment | drums | SW014 |
| September 2019 | Conan Neutron & the Secret Friends: Protons and Electrons | Seismic Wave Entertainment | drums | SW027 |
| December 2020 | Plan D | Joyful Noise Recordings | drums | JNR 309 |
| December 2020 | Conan Neutron & the Secret Friends: Dark Passengers | Learning Curve Records | drums | LCR077-1 |
| February 2022 | Conan Neutron & the Secret Friends: Dangerous Nomenclature | Learning Curve Records | drums | LCR080-1 |
| October 2023 | Conan Neutron & the Secret Friends: Adult Prom | Learning Curve Records | drums | LCR090-1 |
| March 2025 | Conan Neutron & the Secret Friends: The Way of the Neutron | Seismic Wave Entertainment | drums, vocals | SW036 |

=== Solo ===
| Date of release | Title | Label | Album/Single | Credited for | Catalog number |
|---|---|---|---|---|---|
| August 2016 | Skins | Joyful Noise Recordings | Single | Performer | |
| July 2017 | The Fickle Finger of Fate | Joyful Noise Recordings | Album | Vocals, Guitar, Drums | JNR235 |
| August 2019 | Sell Out | Seismic Wave Entertainment | Single | Vocals, Guitar | SW026 |
| May 2020 | Piso Mojado | Joyful Noise Recordings | Single | Vocals, Guitar | JNR341 |
| August 2020 | Swiss Triplets | Joyful Noise Recordings | Single | Vocals, Guitar | JNR344-7 |
| December 2020 | Christmas Time Is Here | Joyful Noise Recordings | Single | Vocals, Guitar | JNR369-11 |
| January 2021 | Rat-A-Tat-Tat! | Joyful Noise Recordings | Album | Vocals, Guitar, Drums | JNR345 |
| June 2024 | Doug Yuletide | Joyful Noise Recordings | Single | Vocals, Guitar, Drums | JNR484 |
| July 2024 | Rings | Joyful Noise Recordings | Flexi | Vocals, Guitar, Drums | JNR484 |
| July 2024 | Glossolalia | Joyful Noise Recordings | Album | Vocals, Guitar, Drums | JNR484 |

=== with Altamont ===
| Date of release | Title | Label | Credited for | Catalog number |
|---|---|---|---|---|
| May 27, 1997 | Wanted Dead or Alive (split album with Acid King) | Man's Ruin Records | | MR-072 |
| October 13, 1998 | Civil War Fantasy | Man's Ruin Records | | MR-085 |
| March 26, 1999 | In the Groove (Compilation album, Rattlesnake Shake) | The Music Cartel | | |
| July 10, 2000 | Right in the Nuts (Compilation album, Make It) | Small Stone Records | | |
| May 1, 2001 | Our Darling | Man's Ruin Records | | MR-2020 |
| November 1, 2005 | The Monkee's Uncle | AntAcidAudio | | AAA-995 |

=== with Melvins ===
| Date of release | Title | Label | Credited for | Catalog number |
|---|---|---|---|---|
| 1986 | Six Songs | C/Z Records | | CZ002 |
| 1987 | Gluey Porch Treatments | Alchemy Records | | VM103 |
| 1989 | Ozma | Boner Records | | BR16-2 |
| August 21, 1991 | Kill Rock Stars (Compilation album, Ever Since My Accident) | Kill Rock Stars | | KSR 201 |
| 1991 | Your Choice Live Series Vol. 12 | Your Choice Records | | YC-LS 012 |
| 1991 | Bullhead | Boner Records | | BR25-2 |
| 1991 | Eggnog | Boner Records | | BR28-2 |
| 1992 | Salad of a Thousand Delights | Box Dog Video | | BDV002 |
| 1992 | Dale Crover | Boner Records | | BR33-2 |
| 1992 | Lysol (aka Melvins) | Boner Records | | BR35-2 |
| September 21, 1993 | Houdini | Atlantic Records | | 82532-2 |
| August 1994 | Prick | Amphetamine Reptile Records | | AmRep 031 |
| September 1994 | Stoner Witch | Atlantic Records | | 82704-2 |
| July 15, 1996 | Stag | Atlantic Records | | 82878-2 |
| May 5, 1997 | Honky | Amphetamine Reptile Records | | AmRep 064-2 |
| August 26, 1997 | Singles 1–12 | Amphetamine Reptile Records | | AmRep 063 |
| 1998 | Alive at the Fucker Club | Amphetamine Reptile Records | | AmRep 072 |
| May 17, 1999 | The Maggot | Ipecac Recordings | | IPC-002 |
| August 23, 1999 | The Bootlicker | Ipecac Recordings | | IPC-004 |
| February 7, 2000 | The Crybaby | Ipecac Recordings | | IPC-006 |
| November 27, 2000 | Gluey Porch Treatments | Ipecac Recordings | | IPC-012 |
| February 6, 2001 | Electroretard | Man's Ruin Records | | MR2002 |
| April 16, 2001 | Colossus of Destiny | Ipecac Recordings | | IPC-014 |
| April 1, 2002 | Millennium Monsterwork 2000 with Fantômas | Ipecac Recordings | | IPC-019 |
| April 15, 2002 | Hostile Ambient Takeover | Ipecac Recordings | | IPC-020 |
| March 11, 2003 | 26 Songs | Ipecac Recordings | | IPC-038 |
| September 16, 2003 | Melvinmania: The Best of the Atlantic Years 1993–1996 | Atlantic Records | | 5050466574428 |
| March 9, 2004 | Neither Here nor There | Ipecac Recordings | | IPC-047 |
| August 23, 2004 | Pigs of the Roman Empire with Lustmord | Ipecac Recordings | | IPC-054 |
| October 19, 2004 | Never Breathe What You Can't See with Jello Biafra | Alternative Tentacles | | Virus300 |
| September 26, 2005 | Sieg Howdy! with Jello Biafra | Alternative Tentacles | | Virus350 |
| May 16, 2006 | A Live History of Gluttony and Lust; Houdini Live 2005 | Ipecac Recordings | | IPC-076 |
| October 10, 2006 | (A) Senile Animal | Ipecac Recordings | | IPC-082 |
| July 8, 2008 | Nude with Boots | Ipecac Recordings | | IPC-105 |
| June 1, 2010 | The Bride Screamed Murder | Ipecac Recordings | | IPC-112 |
| June 5, 2012 | Freak Puke (Melvins Lite) | Ipecac Recordings | | IPC-136 |
| April 30, 2013 | Everybody Loves Sausages | Ipecac Recordings | | IPC-144 |
| November 5, 2013 | Tres Cabrones | Ipecac Recordings | | IPC-150 |
| October 14, 2014 | Hold It In | Ipecac Recordings | | IPC-164 |
| April 1, 2016 | Three Men and a Baby with Mike Kunka | Sub Pop | | SP 1147 |
| June 3, 2016 | Basses Loaded | Ipecac Recordings | | IPC-178 |
| July 7, 2017 | A Walk with Love & Death | Ipecac Recordings | | IPC-195 |
| April 20, 2018 | Pinkus Abortion Technician | Ipecac Recordings | | IPC-201 |
| February 26, 2021 | Working with God | Ipecac Recordings | | IPC-234 |
| October 15, 2021 | Five Legged Dog | Ipecac Recordings | | IPC-238 |
| September 30, 2022 | Bad Mood Rising | Amphetamine Reptile Records | | AMREP 145 |
| April 19, 2024 | Tarantula Heart | Ipecac Recordings | | IPC-276 |
| April 18, 2025 | Thunderball | Ipecac Recordings | | IPC-290 |
| April 10, 2026 | Savage Imperial Death March | Amphetamine Reptile Records | | AmRep 158 |

=== with Nirvana ===
| Date of release | Title | Label | Credited for | Catalog number |
|---|---|---|---|---|
| June 15, 1989 | Bleach (On the songs "Floyd the Barber", "Paper Cuts" and "Downer") | Sub Pop | | SP-034 |
| November 21, 1989 | Teriyaki Asthma, Volume 1 (Compilation album, "Mexican Seafood") | C/Z Records | | CZ009 |
| August 21, 1991 | Kill Rock Stars (Compilation album, "Beeswax") | Kill Rock Stars | | KRS-201 |
| November 1991 | Teriyaki Asthma Vols. I-V (Compilation album, "Mexican Seafood") | C/Z Records | | CZ037 |
| December 14, 1992 | Incesticide (On the songs "Beeswax", "Downer", "Mexican Seafood", "Hairspray Queen", and "Aero Zeppelin") | DGC Records | | DGCD-24504 |
| November 23, 2004 | With the Lights Out (On the songs "If You Must", "Pen Cap Chew", "Downer", "Floyd the Barber", "Raunchola/Moby Dick", and "Drain You") | Geffen Records | | B0003727-00 |
| November 1, 2005 | Sliver: The Best of the Box (On the song "Drain You") | Geffen Records | | |

=== with Redd Kross ===
| Date of release | Title | Label | Credited for | Catalog number |
|---|---|---|---|---|
| 2019 | Beyond the Door | Merge Records | Drums, Percussion, Backing Vocals | MGR684 |
| 2024 | Redd Kross AKA The Redd Album | In the Red Records | Drums, Percussion, Backing Vocals | ITR400 |

=== with Sleep ===
| Date of release | Title | Label | Credited for | Catalog number |
|---|---|---|---|---|
| 2026 | Hempispheres | Third Man | Drums | TMR1080LP |

| Preceded by Mike Dillard | Melvins drummer 1984–present | Succeeded by Current |
| Preceded by Aaron Burckhard; Chad Channing | Nirvana Drummer (two stints); January 1988; August 1990 | Succeeded by Dave Foster; Dan Peters |
