= Working with God =

Studio album by Melvins
- Released: February 26, 2021
- Genres: Sludge metal; noise rock
- Length: 37:47
- Label: Ipecac
- Producer: The Melvins

Melvins chronology
Pinkus Abortion Technician (2018)	Working with God (2021)	Five Legged Dog (2021)

Singles from Working with God
- 1. "I Fuck Around" / "Bouncing Rick" Released: November 13, 2020; 2. "Brian, The Horse-Faced Goon" Released: December 11, 2020; 3. "Caddy Daddy" Released: January 1 2021; 4. "The Great Good Place" Released: January 22 2021; 5. "Fuck You" Released: February 12 2021

Professional ratings
Aggregate scores
Source	Rating
Metacritic	79/100
Review scores
Source	Rating
AllMusic	3.5/5 stars
Kerrang!	4/5
Paste	8.2/10
Metal Injection	7.5/10

Working with God is the 24th album by American rock band Melvins, released on February 26, 2021, through Ipecac Recordings.

It was elected by Loudwire as the 32nd best rock/metal album of 2021.

== Track listing ==
All tracks are written by Buzz Osborne, except where noted.

No.	Title	Writer(s)	Length
1.	"I Fuck Around" (cover of the Beach Boys song "I Get Around")	Brian Wilson, Mike Love	2:20
2.	"Negative No No"		3:51
3.	"Bouncing Rick"		3:39
4.	"Caddy Daddy"		4:26
5.	"1 Brian, the Horse-Faced Goon"		0:43
6.	"Brian, the Horse-Faced Goon"	Dale Crover, Osborne	2:06
7.	"Boy Mike"		3:47
8.	"1 Fuck You" (tribute/cover of Harry Nilsson's song "You're Breakin' My Heart")	Nilsson	2:28
9.	"Fuck You"		0:11
10.	"The Great Good Place"		3:51
11.	"Hot Fish"	Osborne, Trevor Dunn	5:00
12.	"Hund"		3:15
13.	"Good Night Sweetheart"	Calvin Carter, James "Pookie" Hudson	2:10
Total length:			37:47

== Personnel ==
- King Buzzo – guitar, vocals, gadgets
- Dale Crover – bass, vocals, drums
- Mike Dillard – drums, vocals

=== Additional personnel ===
- Toshi Kasai – engineer
- John Golden – mastering
- Mackie Osborne – art
