= Buzz Osborne =

American musician (born 1964)

- Osborne performing in 2018

Background information
- Also known as: King Buzzo
- Born: Roger Osborne; March 25, 1964 (age 62); Morton, Washington, U.S.
- Genres: Sludge metal; alternative metal; grunge; experimental rock; doom metal; hardcore punk (early)
- Occupations: Musician; singer; songwriter; producer
- Instruments: Vocals; guitar
- Years active: 1983–present
- Member of: Melvins; Fantômas; Gatta Morta
- Formerly of: Venomous Concept; Crystal Fairy; Fecal Matter

Roger "Buzz" Osborne (born March 25, 1964), also known as King Buzzo, is an American guitarist, vocalist, and songwriter. He is a founding member of the rock band Melvins, as well as Fantômas and Venomous Concept.

== Biography ==
Born in Morton, Washington, Osborne moved to Montesano, Washington at age of 12. He started listening to Aerosmith and Ted Nugent, then became interested in punk rock after a few years. In the early 1980s, Osborne founded the Melvins with Matt Lukin and Mike Dillard who all attended Montesano High School (Wheeler Building) where he graduated in 1982. The Melvins began playing fast hardcore punk after Osborne was introduced to bands such as Black Flag, Flipper, and MDC by a friend. When Dillard left the band in 1984, Dale Crover was recruited, and the band's rehearsals moved to a back room of Crover's parents' house in Aberdeen, Washington. They began to play slower and "heavier" songs.

In 1986, the band released their Six Songs EP on C/Z Records (later re-released as Eight Songs, 10 Songs and as 26 Songs in 2003 on Ipecac Recordings) that was recorded live to a two-track. In October 1986, they recorded their first full album, Gluey Porch Treatments, at Studio D in Sausalito, California, which was released in 1987 on Alchemy Records (and later re-released as a bonus on the CD version of their second album Ozma on Boner Records and in 1999 on Ipecac Recordings with some garage demos).

In 1988, Osborne, with Crover, relocated to San Francisco, California where the band recorded their next album, Ozma, in May 1989. It was released later that year.

Osborne, along with the rest of the Melvins, knew the members of Nirvana. When Dave Grohl's previous band, Scream, disbanded, he approached Osborne for advice. Osborne, in response, introduced Grohl to Kurt Cobain and Krist Novoselic.

In 1997, Osborne appeared in the promo video for The Offspring's video "All I Want", as a masked pianist. Osborne also appears in the 1994 video for the Beck song "Beercan" which samples the Melvins' song "Hog Leg".

Osborne joined Tool onstage during their tour for Ænima. The Melvins also opened for Tool on the tour. In 1998, Osborne joined a new band known as Fantômas with Faith No More and Mr. Bungle vocalist Mike Patton, a band which he remains involved with to the present day.

Fantômas' latest studio album release is 2005's Suspended Animation. A concept album, it focused on the theme of holidays and featured a frenetic punk rock sound. The album was a commercial success and reached the No. 7 spot on Billboard's Top Heatseekers chart and No. 12 on its Top Independent Albums chart.

In 2014, Osborne announced his first solo acoustic tour along with a 10" EP entitled This Machine Kills Artists and an album to follow in June on Ipecac Recordings.

Osborne makes a cameo appearance in the 2014 video game Sunset Overdrive as himself and performs a song for the soundtrack.

In 2017, he played as part of Crystal Fairy with Teri Gender Bender, Dale Crover and Omar Rodríguez-López. In that same year, he also co-produced the full-length album Orenda by rock band With Our Arms to the Sun.

== Influences ==
Osborne telling a story about Iggy Pop in 2014

Osborne has remarked, "From a very early age I was interested in underground music. I never appreciated the big stadium shows in the first place—I cut my milk teeth musically on smaller shows. A much more intimate basis. That's the lessons I learned from punk rock that I never forgot. That extends to today." As referred to before, he had a very wide set of musical influences since his childhood, ranging from arena rock to glam rock to punk to power pop and more. Osborne has called himself a lifelong "musical anthropologist" and stated that "since I never grew up around people who gave me any indication of how one was supposed to act, I was equally excited seeing the Kinks as I would be by seeing a punk rock band. Or Cheap Trick." In terms of hip hop music, he has stated that his favorite rap album is Run-D.M.C.'s Raising Hell.

== Legacy and praise ==
[Osborne] has more music in his little finger than we all have in our entire bodies.

— Mike Patton, 2004

From their earlier slow metal style, the Melvins have been attributed with providing the framework for what would become the grunge, sludge metal and drone doom genres. Buzz Osborne's seminal influence on grunge have sometimes led him (and his band) to be dubbed as the "Godfather of Grunge".

Labelled as an "icon of the alt-metal world", Osborne has been named a key influence by guitarists such as Kurt Cobain (Nirvana), Adam Jones (Tool), Dave Grohl (Foo Fighters), Kim Thayil (Soundgarden), Brent Hinds and Bill Kelliher (Mastodon), Matt Pike (Sleep), Greg Anderson and Stephen O'Malley (Sunn O)))), Jimmy Bower (Eyehategod), Hank Williams III and Nate Garrett (Spirit Adrift). Adam Jones said that Osborne possesses the two most important qualities for any guitarist, i.e. "attitude and discipline", and compared his artistry with King Crimson founder Robert Fripp. Jones added: "Where I do more of a shoe-gazer thing onstage, Buzz will microwave a crowd." Scott Kelly of Neurosis stated that Osborne's non-cyclical approach to riffs was a massive influence on his band, wherein he plays a section once or at most twice in a song without repeating it again. Kim Thayil cited that same aspect as highly inspirational, in addition to Osborne's drop D tuning and slower compositions. Dylan Carlson, leader of the drone metal band Earth, has constantly cited Osborne's personal advice as a guide for his career path. The bands Earth and Sunn O))), both heavily influenced by Melvins' slower pieces, based their amplifier choices on those of Osborne, as did Clutch.

After Corrosion of Conformity original singer Mike Dean left the band in 1987, they contacted Osborne to join in.

Emma Ruth Rundle called him "a worthy hero in all regards and a very genuine man."

=== Reaction to grunge's influence ===
Although the Melvins had a massive influence on the "Seattle sound", Osborne has constantly expressed negativity toward that scene. He has denounced what he calls the romanticization of it, which he instead describes as a "horrendous nightmare"; Osborne was a childhood friend of Kurt Cobain and remained close to Chris Cornell of Soundgarden until both singers committed suicide following their struggles with drug addiction. At the time, Osborne and his Melvins bandmates also used drugs, including toluene, but by 2014 he had been around twenty years sober. In a 2018 interview, asked if his feelings about that period changed after the deaths of Cobain and Cornell, Osborne replied:

It's totally tainted. Absolutely. I'll never get over that stuff, ever. I think it's hard to people to imagine that [he doesn't agree that] things like that can just happen and you just move on, "it's ok." ... It's a horrible, horrendous nightmare, ending in tragedy and I honestly I wish none of it would have ever happened and [they] would be still alive. That'd be a lot better, a much better ending. ... I'm not much in denial with my own emotions. I pretty much say whatever I think, ... And if people want to look at that with some kind of nostalgia, good old days type of thing, I just don't see how suicide and heroin addiction are romantic in any way. ...

== Personal life and beliefs ==
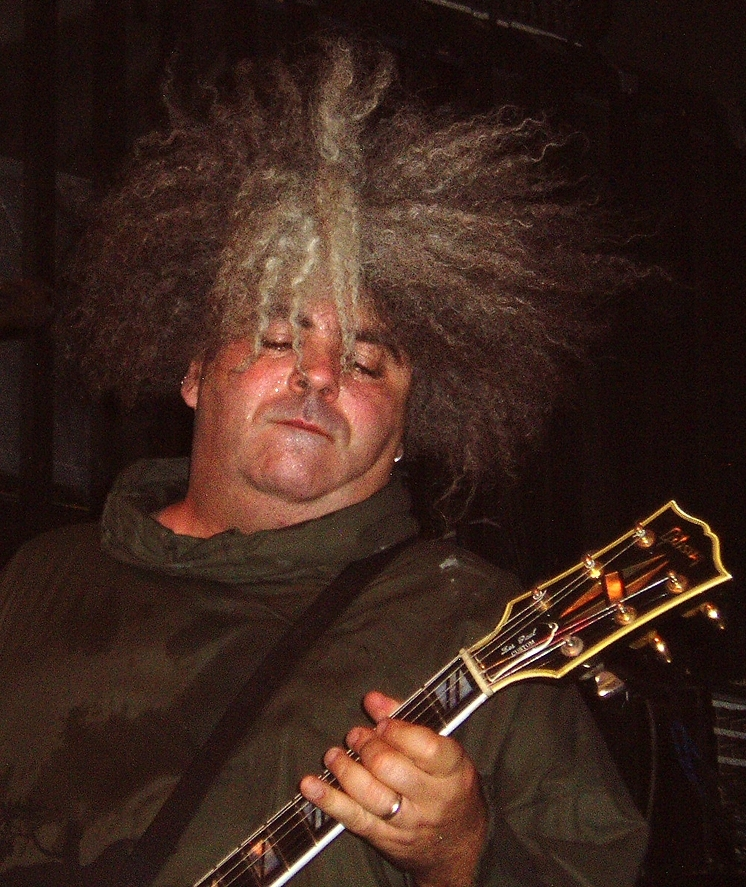
Osborne performing in 2006

In 1987 Osborne was married to musician Lori Alden Black, daughter of Shirley Temple and Charles Black. Osborne has been married to graphic designer Mackie Osborne since 1993. They are dog owners, having kept several rescued dogs. The couple decided not to have children. Osborne does not believe rock musicians should make political statements and that people "should look for higher sources than entertainers for their political beliefs". He is an avid golf fan and player.

Despite past use, Osborne has stated that he does not drink alcohol and has not used other recreational drugs for some time.

=== Political and social views ===
In a 2011 interview with the music magazine L.A. Record, Osborne stated when asked about American politics that "I hate conservatives, but I really hate liberals. Here's the thing. I have my own opinions about everything, and it's basically classic liberalism." In 2008, he told the magazine Alarm that he opposes what he sees as both modern socialist and fascist thought, stating that he's "into true liberalism, which means you mind your own goddamn business; you take care of yourself." In a 2014 interview with Tonedeaf, Osborne expressed that American economist Thomas Sowell has been a major influence on his career. "I consider Sowell the greatest philosopher of all time." Osborne explained. "He is a PhD economist and he's written more than 30 books about everything you can imagine, from social commentary to how economics works."

In a 2008 interview with City Newspaper of Rochester, when asked about his collaboration with Jello Biafra on two albums, Osborne stated that "I don't relate at all to his politics. I believe in personal freedom, personal responsibility. And nobody tells you what to do more than the left wing. They're a bunch of fascists."

In terms of issues covering copyright and illegal file-sharing of songs, Osborne's remarked, "The internet downloading—people need to get over it". He's also added, "Is it stealing? Sure, yeah—but it doesn't matter. It's over. Things have changed. We have to move on." In an earlier interview, he argued, "For me musically, I wish I woulda had something like YouTube when I was a kid so I could go, 'Oh, what's this Captain Beefheart?'"

== Collaborations and guest appearances ==
Beyond his primary work with the Melvins, Osborne has collaborated widely across genres. He played second guitar on Tool’s live recording of “You Lied,” included in the 2000 release Salival. He also appeared in Beck’s 1994 music video for “Beercan,” which sampled the Melvins’ song “Hog Leg,” and in The Offspring’s 1997 promo clip for “All I Want” as a masked pianist.

Osborne has contributed guitar and vocals to experimental composer Lustmord’s albums Juggernaut (2007) and O T H E R (2008), and more recently played guitar on Redd Kross’s 2019 album Beyond the Door.

== Musical equipment ==
Osborne primarily uses Gibson Les Paul guitars from the 1960s and 1970s, played through Boss effect pedals, and an assortment of vintage amplifiers.

== Discography ==
Solo King Buzzo albums
Release date	Title	Label	Catalogue number
June 3, 2014	This Machine Kills Artists (as King Buzzo)	Ipecac Recordings	IPC-159
August 14, 2020	Gift of Sacrifice (as King Buzzo)	Ipecac Recordings	IPC-223

The Melvins albums
Release date	Title	Label	Catalogue number
1986	Six Songs	C/Z Records	CZ002
1987	Gluey Porch Treatments	Alchemy Records	VM103
1989	Ozma	Boner Records	BR16-2
1991	Your Choice Live Series Vol.12	Your Choice Records	YC-LS 012
1991	Bullhead	Boner Records	BR25-2
1991	Eggnog	Boner Records	BR28-2
1992	Salad of a Thousand Delights	Box Dog Video	BDV002
1992	King Buzzo	Boner Records	BR32-2
1992	Lysol (aka Melvins)	Boner Records	BR35-2
September 21, 1993	Houdini	Atlantic Records	82532-2
August 5, 1994	Prick	Amphetamine Reptile Records	AmRep 031
October 18, 1994	Stoner Witch	Atlantic Records	82704-2
July 15, 1996	Stag	Atlantic Records	82878-2
May 5, 1997	Honky	Amphetamine Reptile Records	AmRep 064-2
August 26, 1997	Singles 1–12	Amphetamine Reptile Records	AmRep 063
1998	Alive at the Fucker Club	Amphetamine Reptile Records	AmRep 072
May 17, 1999	The Maggot	Ipecac Recordings	IPC-002
August 23, 1999	The Bootlicker	Ipecac Recordings	IPC-004
February 7, 2000	The Crybaby	Ipecac Recordings	IPC-006
November 27, 2000	Gluey Porch Treatments	Ipecac Recordings	IPC-012
February 6, 2001	Electroretard	Man's Ruin Records	MR2002
April 16, 2001	Colossus of Destiny	Ipecac Recordings	IPC-014
April 1, 2002	Millennium Monsterwork 2000 with Fantômas	Ipecac Recordings	IPC-019
April 15, 2002	Hostile Ambient Takeover	Ipecac Recordings	IPC-020
March 11, 2003	26 Songs	Ipecac Recordings	IPC-038
September 16, 2003	Melvinmania: The Best Of The Atlantic Years 1993–1996	Atlantic Records	5050466574428
March 9, 2004	Neither Here Nor There	Ipecac Recordings	IPC-047
August 23, 2004	Pigs of the Roman Empire with Lustmord	Ipecac Recordings	IPC-054
October 19, 2004	Never Breathe What You Can't See with Jello Biafra	Alternative Tentacles	Virus300
May 31, 2005	Mangled Demos from 1983	Ipecac Recordings	IPC-063
September 26, 2005	Sieg Howdy! with Jello Biafra	Alternative Tentacles	Virus350
May 16, 2006	A Live History of Gluttony and Lust; Houdini Live 2005	Ipecac Recordings	IPC-076
October 10, 2006	(A) Senile Animal	Ipecac Recordings	IPC-082
2008	Melvins vs. Minneapolis	Amphetamine Reptile Records/Burlesque of North America Records	
July 8, 2008	Nude With Boots	Ipecac Recordings	IPC-105
June 1, 2010	The Bride Screamed Murder	Ipecac Recordings	IPC-112
March 13, 2012	The Bulls & The Bees	Scion A/V	SA/V 18-12
June 5, 2012	Freak Puke	Ipecac Recordings	IPC-136
April 30, 2013	Everybody Loves Sausages	Ipecac Recordings	IPC-144
November 5, 2013	Tres Cabrones	Ipecac Recordings	IPC-150
October 14, 2014	Hold It In	Ipecac Recordings	IPC-164
April 1, 2016	Three Men and a Baby with Mike Kunka	Sub Pop	SP 1147
June 3, 2016	Basses Loaded	Ipecac Recordings	IPC-178
July 7, 2017	A Walk with Love & Death	Ipecac Recordings	IPC-195
April 20, 2018	Pinkus Abortion Technician	Ipecac Recordings	IPC-201
February 26, 2021	Working with God	Ipecac Recordings	IPC-234
October 15, 2021	Five Legged Dog	Ipecac Recordings	IPC-238
September 13, 2022	Bad Mood Rising	Amphetamine Reptile Records	AmRep 145
April 19, 2024	Tarantula Heart	Ipecac Recordings	

Fantômas albums
Release date	Title	Label	Catalogue number
April 26, 1999	Fantômas (aka 'Amenaza Al Mundo')	Ipecac Recordings	IPC-001
July 9, 2001	The Director's Cut	Ipecac Recordings	IPC-017
April 1, 2002	Millennium Monsterwork 2000	Ipecac Recordings	IPC-019
January 27, 2004	Delìrium Còrdia	Ipecac Recordings	IPC-045
April 5, 2005 (Limited Edition); June 14, 2005	Suspended Animation	Ipecac Recordings	IPC-062 (Limited Edition); IPC-065

Venomous Concept albums
Release date	Title	Label	Catalogue number
June 29, 2004	Retroactive Abortion	Ipecac Recordings	IPC-051

Guest appearances by Osborne
Release date	Title	Label	Catalogue number
1998	Cows: Sorry in Pig Minor	Amphetamine Reptile Records	Producer
1999	Goatsnake: Goatsnake Vol. 1	Southern Lord Records	Producer and mixing on Dog Catcher
December 12, 2000	Tool: Salival	Volcano II	Second guitar on You Lied
September 18, 2001	Tweaker: The Attraction to All Things Uncertain	Waxploitation	co-wrote/guitar on Swamp
2004	Various Artists: Spin the Bottle: An All-Star Tribute to Kiss	Koch Records	Vocals on God of Thunder
2007	Lustmord : Juggernaut	Hydra Head	Guitar and vocals
2008	Lustmord: O T H E R	Hydra Head	Guitar on Prime [Aversion]
2019	Redd Kross: Beyond The Door	Merge Records	Guitar on The Party Underground
