= Alive at the Fucker Club =

Live album by Melvins
- Released: 1998
- Recorded: August 23, 1997
- Genre: Sludge metal
- Length: 21:41
- Label: Amphetamine Reptile

Melvins chronology
Singles 1–12 (1997)	Alive at the Fucker Club (1998)	The Maggot (1999)

Professional ratings
Review scores
Source	Rating
AllMusic	3.5/5 stars

Alive at the Fucker Club is a live album by Melvins, which was released in 1998 through Amphetamine Reptile Records. Recorded live August 23, 1997, at the Corner Hotel in Richmond, Melbourne, Australia. The Melvins opened for the Cosmic Psychos in Richmond on August 22, August 23 and 24.

The length of the first four tracks doesn't match the songs: "Boris" is 0:00 (track 1) to 5:00 (track 1), "It's Shoved" is 5:00 (track 1) to 2:10 (track 2), "Bar-X-The Rocking M" is 2:10 (track 2) to 1:26 (track 3), "Smoke on the Water (Jam)" is 1:26 (track 3) to 1:48 (track 3) and "Antitoxidote" is 1:48 (track 3) to the end of track 4. The jam of Deep Purple's "Smoke on the Water" is uncredited.

== Track listing ==
No.	Title	Writer(s)	Length
1.	"Boris"	Osborne	6:06
2.	"It's Shoved"	Osborne	2:54
3.	"Bar-X-the Rocking M"	Crover, Deutrom, Osborne	1:58
4.	"Antitoxidote"	Osborne	2:06
5.	"The Bloat"	Osborne	3:28
6.	"Lizzy"	Melvins	3:13
7.	"Mombius Hibachi"	Melvins	1:56

== Personnel ==
- Buzz Osborne – guitar, vocals
- Dale Crover – drums, vocals
- Mark Deutrom – bass, vocals
