= Bad Mood Rising =

2022 album by Melvins

Studio album by Melvins
- Released: August 21, 2022
- Genre: Sludge metal
- Length: 41:29
- Label: Amphetamine Reptile

Melvins chronology
Five Legged Dog (2021)	Bad Mood Rising (2022)	Tarantula Heart (2024)

Bad Mood Rising is the 26th studio album by American rock band Melvins, released on August 21, 2022, through Amphetamine Reptile Records. It joined streaming services on September 30, 2022.

== Recording ==
Speaking to It's Psychedelic Baby magazine, drummer Dale Crover stated that "We've been working with Toshi Kasai, the engineer, for a long time. We've been working with him since the beginning of the 2000s and for the last seven years, we've had a studio with him. So yeah, quite a few records that we've made have been in that studio and it's also where we rehearse. So, it's really easy to go in and like to sit there and learn something and record it right there. Since we've had that studio, once we get in there, I'll learn a song and once I know it, I'll start recording it right away. Before we had our own space, we did a lot more fine-tuning of songs before we went into the studio. It's maybe a little bit fresher doing it this way." In the same interview, Crover stated that "we did it the summer before last and knowing that going into 2022 that we were hopefully going to be doing a bunch of touring but we didn't quite know when it was going to come out. Just because with everything, vinyl has been really hard to get made. Everybody made a record during the pandemic. So it's like, we kind of had a timeframe but we didn't want to release digital first and that kind of stuff. So, it kind of came out without any big fanfare just because all of a sudden the vinyl showed up earlier than it was supposed to and we were already on tour and all that."

== Release ==
The album was announced on August 15, 2022, and released on August 21, 2022. Guitar World described the album as "an unholy amalgamation of [the band's] diverse influences". Louder Than War described songs on the record as "reminders of some of the Melvins' earliest music", and the album as a whole as "a gift for Melvins fans who want to return to the past, as well as for fans certain the Melvins are better than ever".

== Track listing ==
Bad Mood Rising track listing
No.	Title	Length
1.	"Mister Dog Is Totally Right"	14:09
2.	"Never Say You're Sorry"	5:25
3.	"My Discomfort Is Radiant"	4:52
4.	"It Won't or It Might"	8:30
5.	"Hammering"	5:34
6.	"The Receiver and the Empire State"	2:55
Total length:		41:29

== Personnel ==
Melvins

- Buzz Osborne – guitars, vocals
- Dale Crover – drums, percussion, vocals
- Steven McDonald – bass, vocals

Additional personnel

- Dylan Carlson – additional guitar on “Mister Dog Is Totally Right”
- Toshi Kasai – recording
- Mackie Osborne – artwork
