= Savage Imperial Death March =

Studio album by Melvins with Napalm Death
- Released: February 16, 2025
- Genres: Sludge metal, grindcore
- Length: 38:33
- Labels: Amphetamine Reptile, Ipecac

Singles from Savage Imperial Death March
- 1. "Tossing Coins into the Fountain of Fuck" Released: 2026; 2. "Rip the God" Released: 2026

Professional ratings
Aggregate scores
Source	Rating
Metacritic	78/100
Review scores
Source	Rating
AllMusic	3.5/5 stars
Blabbermouth.net	8/10
Kerrang!	4/5 stars
Louder Than War	4/5 stars
MusicOMH	4/5 stars

Savage Imperial Death March is a collaborative studio album by American rock band Melvins and English extreme metal band Napalm Death. It was first released in a limited vinyl edition on February 16, 2025, through Amphetamine Reptile Records, before a wider release on April 10, 2026, through Ipecac Recordings. The album is a joint project between members of both bands and has been described as a full collaboration rather than a traditional split release.

== Background and recording ==
The title of the album refers to the bands' joint "Savage Imperial Death March" tours in 2016 and 2025. It was recorded at the Melvins' studio in Los Angeles and features contributions from Buzz Osborne and Dale Crover of Melvins, alongside Napalm Death members Barney Greenway, Shane Embury, and John Cooke.

Members of both bands described the project as an equal partnership, with Osborne calling it a "50/50" collaboration. The album has also been characterized as a true collaboration rather than a split release, with both bands writing and performing together on the same material.

== Track listing ==
All tracks are written by Melvins and Napalm Death

No.	Title	Length
1.	"Tossing Coins into the Fountain of Fuck"	3:17
2.	"Some Kind of Antichrist"	9:21
3.	"Awful Handwriting"	2:02
4.	"Nine Days of Rain"	3:51
5.	"Rip the God"	5:20
6.	"Stealing Horses"	4:30
7.	"Comparison Is the Thief of Joy"	4:09
8.	"Death Hour"	6:03
Total length:		38:33

== Personnel ==
Melvins

- Buzz Osborne – guitars, vocals
- Dale Crover – drums

Napalm Death

- Barney Greenway – vocals
- Shane Embury – bass
- John Cooke – guitars

== Charts ==
Chart performance for Savage Imperial Death March
Chart (2026)	Peak position
French Physical Albums (SNEP)	116
French Rock & Metal Albums (SNEP)	27
German Albums (Offizielle Top 100)	91
Scottish Albums (Official Charts)	33
Swiss Albums (Schweizer Hitparade)	50
UK Albums Sales (OCC)	31
UK Independent Albums (Official Charts)	17
UK Rock & Metal Albums (Official Charts)	5
US Top Album Sales (Billboard)	42
