= Pinkus Abortion Technician =

Studio album by Melvins
- Released: April 20, 2018
- Studio: Sound of Sirens Studio
- Genres: Alternative rock, psychedelic rock, experimental rock
- Length: 37:05
- Label: Ipecac
- Producer: Melvins

Melvins chronology
A Walk with Love & Death (2017)	Pinkus Abortion Technician (2018)	Working with God (2021)

Singles from Pinkus Abortion Technician
- 1. "Stop Moving to Florida" Released: February 19, 2018; 2. "Embrace the Rub" Released: March 28, 2018

Pinkus Abortion Technician is the 23rd album by American rock band Melvins, released on April 20, 2018 through Ipecac Recordings. It features both "ongoing" bass player Steven McDonald and "occasional bottom ender" Jeff Pinkus, who receives writing credit on four of the album's five original songs. The title is a direct reference to the Butthole Surfers album Locust Abortion Technician, which Pinkus played bass on.

== Critical reception ==
Professional ratings
Aggregate scores
Source	Rating
Metacritic	69/100
Review scores
Source	Rating
AllMusic	3.5/5 stars
Crack Magazine	6/10
Exclaim!	7/10
The Line of Best Fit	7/10
Metal Hammer	3/5 stars
MetalSucks	2.5/5 stars
MusicOMH	3/5 stars
Punknews.org	4/5 stars

Pinkus Abortion Technician was met with "generally favorable" reviews from critics. At Metacritic, which assigns a weighted average rating out of 100 to reviews from mainstream publications, it received an average score of 69 based on 10 reviews. Aggregator Album of the Year gave the release a 65 out of 100 based on a critical consensus of 15 reviews.

== Track listing ==
No.	Title	Writer(s)	Length
1.	"Stop Moving to Florida"	Jerry Ragovoy, Mort Shuman, Butthole Surfers	5:20
2.	"Embrace the Rub"	Steve McDonald, Anna Waronker, Josh Klinghoffer	1:40
3.	"Don't Forget to Breathe"	Jeff Pinkus	7:53
4.	"Flamboyant Duck"	Dale Crover, Pinkus	5:46
5.	"Break Bread"	Pinkus	2:34
6.	"I Want to Hold Your Hand"	John Lennon, Paul McCartney	4:06
7.	"Prenup Butter"	Pinkus, King Buzzo	4:38
8.	"Graveyard"	Butthole Surfers	5:06

== Personnel ==
- King Buzzo – guitar, vocals
- Dale Crover – drums, guitar, vocals, piano
- Steve McDonald – bass, vocals
- Jeff Pinkus – bass, banjo, vocals

with

- Tom Hazelmyer – special guest musician

=== Additional personnel ===
- Toshi Kasai – engineer
- Mackie Osborne – cover drawing & layout
- Tom Hazelmyer – clown illustrations
