= Salad of a Thousand Delights =

Video by The Melvins
- Released: 1992
- Recorded: May 16, 1991
- Genre: Sludge metal, hardcore punk
- Length: 54:00
- Label: Box Dog Video
- Producer: Jo Smitty and Paul Uusitalo

The Melvins chronology
| Eggnog (1991) | Salad of a Thousand Delights (1992) | King Buzzo (1992) |

Professional ratings
Review scores
| Source | Rating |
|---|---|
| Allmusic | 2.5/5 stars |

Salad of a Thousand Delights is a live performance video produced by Box Dog Video featuring the Melvins. It was recorded in a four-camera shoot at the North Shore Surf Club, Olympia, Washington, May 16, 1991, and released on VHS in 1992. The video was rereleased on DVD (90 mins) in 2002, with bonus live and live-in-the-studio material.

== Track listing ==
1. "Antitoxidote"
2. "Euthanasia"
3. "Zodiac"
4. "Oven"
5. "If I Had An Exorcism"
6. "Boris"
7. "Kool Legged"
8. "Wispy"
9. "It's Shoved"
10. "Anaconda"
11. "Influence Of Atmosphere"
12. "We Reach"
13. "Hog Leg"

== Personnel ==
- Buzz Osborne - guitar, vocals
- Dale Crover - drums, vocals
- Joe Preston - bass, vocals

=== Additional personnel ===
- Jo Smitty - editing, executive producer
- Paul Uusitalo - camera, sound, editing, executive producer
- Bob Basanich - camera
- Craig Joyce - camera
- RE. Bassanova - shaman box
- Todd Morey - cover graphics
- Greg Babar (aka Babar the Elephant) - sound
- Matt Lukin - bass ("Rehearsal" bonus video on DVD, uncredited)
- Mike Dillard - drums (audio of the "Rehearsal" video, uncredited)
