= The Neckbones =

- Origin: Oxford, Mississippi
- Genres: Garage punk
- Years active: 1994–2001; Currently perform live sporadically
- Label: Fat Possum Records
- Members: Dave Boyer, Van Thompson, Tyler Keith, Forrest Hewes
- Past members: Dave Boyer, Robbie Alexander, Tyler Keith, Forrest Hewes

The Neckbones were a garage punk band from Oxford, Mississippi. The band was distinguished by having three vocalists each with a distinct style and for their high-energy live performances. They released three albums: Pay the Rent, self release (1995) and Souls on Fire (1997) and The Lights Are Getting Dim (1999), both on Fat Possum Records. They also released the 10-inch vinyl-only release Gentleman, which was their final release, on Misprint Records in 1999.

== History ==
The Neckbones originally formed as a 3-piece band in 1993, and self-released a full-length cassette only called, "Painting In Trash." Hewes and Keith spent the summer of '94 as roommates, and formed a side project band called The Recession Hookers. Hewes asked Keith to join The Neckbones at the end of the summer. The band's original four members first began playing together as the Neckbones in the fall of 1994. While the band was active, they were the only rock group signed to Fat Possum Records—the other artists on the label were all blues artists. They recorded their debut album for Fat Possum, Souls on Fire, in 1996, but it was not released until the following year due to Fat Possum Records' legal issues. The band released its second and last full-length album, The Lights are Getting Dim, in 1999, and officially disbanded in 2001. After disbanding, guitarist/vocalist Dave Boyer and drummer/vocalist Forrest Hewes joined with guitarist/vocalist Jack Oblivion and bassist/vocalist Scott Rogers to form the group, The Cool Jerks, which released an album entitled Cleaned A Lot Of Plates In Memphis in 2002 on the Sympathy For The Record Industry label. During the same period, Tyler Keith, The Neckbones', other guitarist and vocalist, formed the group Tyler Keith and the Preacher's Kids, which released an album entitled Romeo Hood in 2001. The Neckbones continue to perform live sporadically, with their most recent performance being on September 28, 2018, at the 15th Annual "Gonerfest" garage rock festival in Memphis, TN.

== Reception ==
Robert Christgau reviewed Souls on Fire and gave it an A−. In his review, Christgau compared the band's music favorably to that of Thomas Jefferson Slave Apartments. A review of the album for MTV described the album's music as "the greasy, ballsy kind of rock ‘n’ roll that most bands have either forgotten or abandoned." Writing in Billboard, Chris Morris described the album as "a steaming slab of raving punk rock served up southern-fried".

A review of The Lights are Getting Dim in CMJ compared the band's style to that of Iggy Pop and the Ramones, and praised the band's displays of humor on the album. However, the review also said that the album's music is "unlikely to win over fans looking for a more arcane musical experience." Anthony Mariani wrote in Houston Press that the album was "stuffed with solid tunes". Mike Joyce of the Washington Post reviewed the album favorably, writing that on it, "roadhouse collides with garage, producing a reckless and clangorous hybrid that celebrates the quartet's punk leanings."

== Discography ==
- Pay the Rent (self released, 1995)
- Souls on Fire (Fat Possum, 1997)
- The Lights are Getting Dim (Fat Possum, 1999)
- Gentleman, 10 in vinyl only (Misprint, 1999)
