= Colossus of Destiny =

Live album by Melvins
- Released: April 16, 2001
- Recorded: December 13, 1998
- Genre: Noise
- Length: 59:28
- Label: Ipecac

Melvins chronology
Electroretard (2001)	Colossus of Destiny (2001)	Millennium Monsterwork 2000 (2002)

Professional ratings
Review scores
Source	Rating
AllMusic	4/5 stars

Colossus of Destiny is a live album by Melvins, released in 2001 through Ipecac Recordings. It was recorded live Friday, December 13, 1998, at Club Mangler, Cupertino, California. It is nearly an hour of synthesizer and sample experimentation ending in a performance of the song "Eye Flys". It was reported that members of the audience were lying on the ground, covering their ears during this performance. The album was originally intended to be the third part of the band's 1999 album trilogy (The Maggot, The Bootlicker, and The Crybaby), until they came up with the guest star idea for The Crybaby.

The name of the album is taken from the John Fante book The Road to Los Angeles, in which the main character, Arturo Bandini, writes a book bearing the name Colossus of Destiny.

== Track listing ==
No.	Title	Length
1.	Untitled	59:23
2.	Untitled	0:05

== Personnel ==
- King Buzzo - guitar, vocals, misc.
- Dale Crover - drums, vocals, misc.
- Korny Ass Joker - bass, misc.
- Adam Jones - guitar, misc.

=== Additional personnel ===
- Randy Hawkins - live engineer
- Kurt Schlegle - live engineer
- Mackie Osborne - art
