= Dalek (artist) =

American painter (born 1968)

James Marshall (Dalek)
- Born: James Marshall; May 22, 1968 (age 58); New London, Connecticut, United States
- Education: Virginia Commonwealth University, School of the Art Institute of Chicago
- Known for: Painting, Design, Muralist
- Movement: Contemporary art, Urban art

James Marshall (born May 22, 1968), also known as Dalek, is an American artist and designer based in Raleigh, North Carolina. Dalek has published two books featuring his artwork and been included in many other books and magazines. His artwork has appeared on a wide variety of media, including sneakers, sculptures, and a Scion car.

Perhaps Dalek's most recognizable work is his Space Monkey, a "grinning and malevolent" character, his own vision of a human being.

== Primary sources ==
- Dalek. Sonic Order Of Happiness. Brooklyn: powerHouse, 2005. ISBN 1-57687-247-5
- Marshall, James and Roger Gastman. Dalek Nickel-Plated Angels. Berkeley: Gingko Press, 2003. ISBN 978-1-58423-143-1
- Marshall, James. His Majesty Fallacy. Drago Publishing, 2009. ISBN 978-88-88493-49-7
