= Melvins =

American rock band

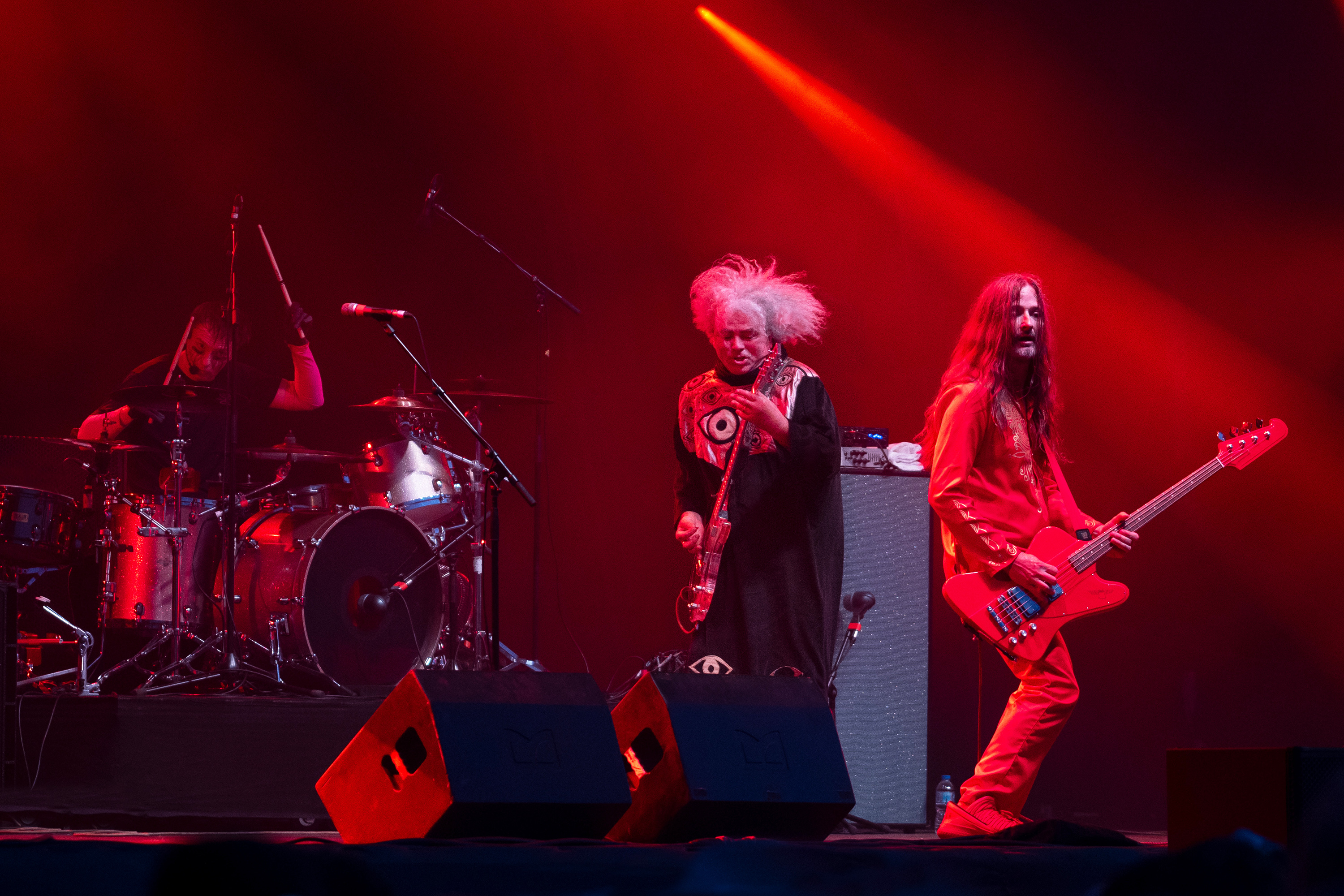
- Melvins live at Hellfest in June 2023. Left to right: Dale Crover, Buzz Osborne and Steven Shane McDonald.

Background information
- Also known as: The Melvins
- Origin: Montesano, Washington, U.S.
- Genres: Sludge metal; experimental rock; alternative metal; grunge; hardcore punk (early)
- Works: Discography
- Years active: 1983–present
- Labels: C/Z; Alchemy; Boner; Atlantic; Amphetamine Reptile; Man's Ruin; Ipecac; Your Choice; Alternative Tentacles; Slap-a-Ham
- Members: Buzz Osborne; Dale Crover; Steven Shane McDonald; Coady Willis
- Past members: Mike Dillard; Matt Lukin; Lori Black; Joe Preston; Mark Deutrom; Kevin Rutmanis; Jared Warren; Trevor Dunn; Jeff Pinkus
- Website: themelvins.net
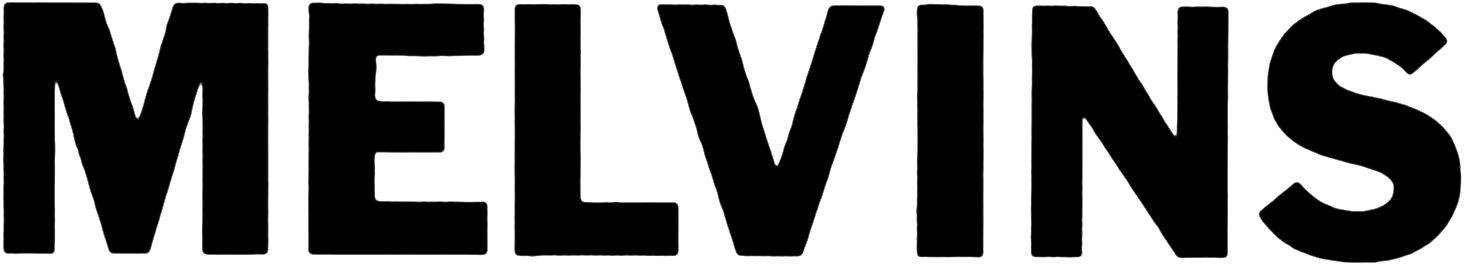

Melvins (Note: Sometimes stylized as The Melvins) are an American rock band formed in 1983 in Montesano, Washington. Known for combining heavy, slow riffs with experimental and eclectic songwriting, the band has been credited as pioneers of sludge metal, and a key influence in the development of alternative metal and grunge. Since 1984, vocalist/guitarist Buzz Osborne and drummer Dale Crover have been the band's only constant members. Primarily a trio, they have also performed as a quartet, with either two drummers or two bassists, and have been credited for their prolific output, having released over 25 studio albums.

== History ==
=== Early years (1983–1987) ===
The Melvins were formed in early 1983 by Buzz Osborne (guitar, vocals), Matt Lukin (bass), and Mike Dillard (drums) who all went to Montesano Jr./Sr. High School in Montesano, Washington. The band was named after a supervisor at a Thriftway in Montesano, where Osborne also worked as a clerk; "Melvin" was disliked by other employees, and the band's members felt it to be an appropriately ridiculous name.

In the beginning, they played Jimi Hendrix and Who covers, and also began playing fast hardcore punk. Dillard left the band in 1984 and was replaced by local drummer Dale Crover. The band's rehearsals moved to a back room of Crover's parents' house in Aberdeen, Washington. Soon afterward, they started to play songs slower and "heavier" than nearly anyone else at the time. In 1985, C/Z Records was created to document the Washington music scene. The label released Deep Six, featuring four songs by the Melvins. In 1986, the band released their debut, the Six Songs EP, on C/Z Records (later releases expanded and retitled this as 8 Songs, 10 Songs, and eventually 26 Songs in 2003 on Ipecac Recordings). The album was recorded live to a two track at the now closed Ironwood Studio in Seattle on February 8, 1986.

In October 1986, they recorded their first full-length album, Gluey Porch Treatments, at Studio D in Sausalito, California. The album was released in 1987 on Alchemy Records. Gluey Porch Treatments was later coupled with their second album Ozma for the Boner Records CD release. It was expanded again for the 1999 re-release on Ipecac with some garage demos.

=== Boner Records era (1988–1992) ===
Crover played drums with Nirvana (booked under "Kurt Kovain" after mishearing the frontman for the then-currently unnamed band's name) when they recorded a ten-song demo on January 23, 1988, in Seattle, which later formed part of their debut album Bleach, and played a live show in Tacoma later that day. Osborne would later introduce Kurt Cobain and Krist Novoselic to Dave Grohl. Later that year Osborne and Crover relocated to San Francisco, California. Lukin stayed and formed the band Mudhoney. Lori "Lorax" Black (daughter of Shirley Temple) replaced Lukin on bass. The band recorded Ozma in May 1989, and released it later that year. The album was produced by Mark Deutrom, who later joined the band on bass.

In 1990, the band recorded Bullhead, which marked a slower, more drone music style for the band. The band then toured Europe; their show of January 23, 1991 in Alzey, Germany was released by Your Choice Records as Your Choice Live Series Vol.12. When they returned to the U.S., they recorded the Eggnog EP, which was released the same year on Boner Records.

Lorax left the band, and was replaced by Joe Preston. Preston appears on the Salad of a Thousand Delights (1992, Box Dog Video). Melvins then released three "solo" EPs, following the concept and imitating the cover artwork inspired by the four Kiss members' solo albums released in 1978. King Buzzo, Dale Crover, and Joe Preston were all released in 1992 on Boner Records. Later in 1992, they released the full-length album, Lysol, which had to be renamed Melvins because Lysol was a trademarked name. Preston departed from the band, and Lorax briefly rejoined.

=== Atlantic Records era (1993–1997) ===
When Nirvana's Nevermind became a massive and unexpected success, Melvins were one of many groups to benefit from Nirvana's support. Melvins were signed by Atlantic Records, and its first major label release, 1993's Houdini, entered the Billboard Heatseekers chart at 29. Mark Deutrom replaced Lorax on bass shortly after the album's release.

Melvins released its second album for Atlantic in 1994, Stoner Witch. Due to its experimental nature, Melvins took its next album, Prick, to Amphetamine Reptile Records. Record label conflicts prevented the band from releasing any records under the name "Melvins", so the album was released with the band name written in mirror. The band returned to Atlantic one last time for 1996's Stag, which entered the Heatseekers chart at number 33. Melvins were dropped by Atlantic Records in 1997 after three albums.

=== Switching labels and continued experimentation (1997–2004) ===
The band signed with Amphetamine Reptile Records and released their next full-length album, Honky, in 1997. They recorded an August 1997 concert in Richmond, Melbourne, Australia as Alive at the Fucker Club in 1998. The same year, Melvins opened for Tool. (A picture on the Tool website depicts the Melvins along with the words "Melvins say...Tool Sux!" spelled out in lunch meat. The photo was taken while on tour with Tool in 2002 in Australia.) In 1998, Melvins played the second stage at Ozzfest.

1999 saw the beginning of a partnership with Mike Patton's Ipecac Recordings, which began remastering and reissuing much of the band's back catalog. The band also released three full-length albums dubbed (and later packaged together as) The Trilogy: The Maggot, The Bootlicker, and The Crybaby. The latter featured a number of guest vocalists and musicians. Kevin Rutmanis, formerly of The Cows, was bassist during this era.

In 2001, the band returned to their experimental tendencies for Colossus of Destiny, a live set of synthesizer and sampler experiments presented as two tracks (one clocking in at 59:23 and the other at five seconds). The album was described approvingly by one critic as "more like avant-garde electro-acoustic than anything else."

In 2002, Ipecac Recordings released Hostile Ambient Takeover, a record that was not in fact ambient music at all. This album is the first instance of Melvins working with long time producer and engineer Toshi Kasai.

In 2003, Atlantic Records (UK) released Melvinmania: Best of the Atlantic Years 1993–1996, a compilation of recycled tracks from the band's three major label releases. This release was unsanctioned by the band who had no input into the track selection or (occasionally inaccurate) liner notes.

In 2004, Osborne and Crover toured to celebrate their 20th anniversary as a band, and also released an art book Neither Here Nor There. The book is a collection of art by creators of their cover art as well as friends of the band, and also contained retrospectives on the past twenty years of the Melvins. The book included a CD with selected tracks from their albums.

=== Later period and collaboration albums (2004–2010) ===
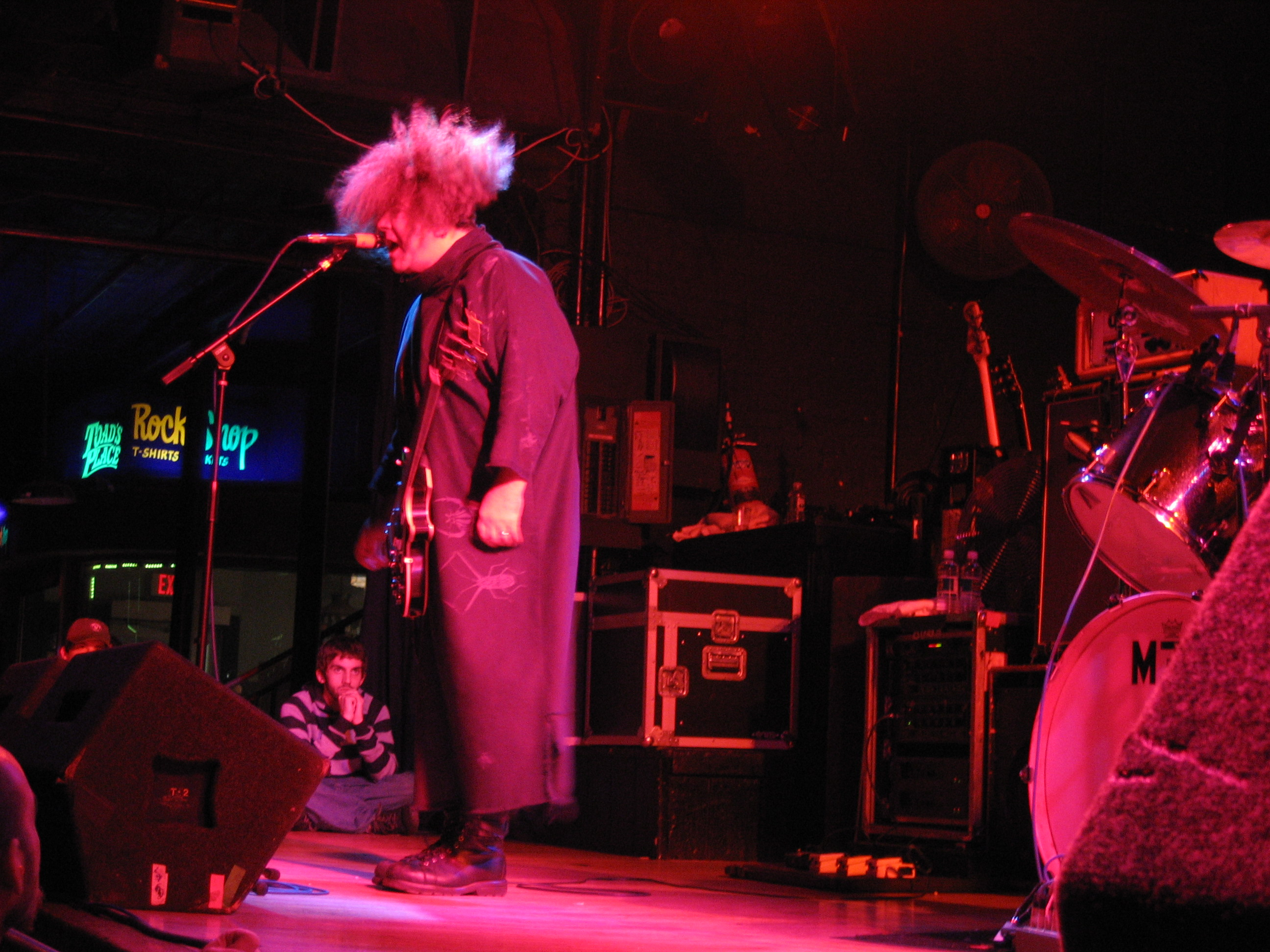
Frontman Buzz Osborne performing in 2006

In 2004, Melvins collaborated with ambient artist Lustmord for Pigs of the Roman Empire and with Dead Kennedys singer Jello Biafra for Never Breathe What You Can't See and Sieg Howdy! released in 2004 and 2005 respectively. Never Breathe What You Can't See was supported by a mini-tour with Jello Biafra and Adam Jones from Tool. A planned European tour was canceled in early October 2004 reportedly due to unknown complications involving Rutmanis. Following the tour cancellation, Melvins finished the year playing a few shows with David Scott Stone supporting the work of filmmaker Cameron Jamie in Europe and the United States.

When asked about Rutmanis and the canceled portion of the tour. Osborne and Crover stated that Rutmanis had "disappeared". Fans feared that Rutmanis had departed like so many bassists before him; however, Rutmanis returned temporarily in early 2005. In June 2005, Rutmanis officially left the band. When Melvins toured with Jello Biafra in October and November 2005, David Scott Stone filled in on bass for both sets. David Scott Stone did not leave the live lineup on good terms, waiting until 9 days before a tour to back out and saying in an interview: "It was unprofessional and a betrayal of a friendship,"

In early 2006, Crover confirmed rumors of both members of the bass-drums duo Big Business joining the Melvins. Commenting on adding another drummer, Crover said this about Big Business drummer Coady Willis: "He's left-handed, so we want to do this 'mirror image' type of thing. We've kind of fused our two drum sets together, and we're going to try and do some crazy thing with it. We're sharing these big toms in between us."

The band toured the U.S. in the fall of 2006 in support of their album, (A) Senile Animal. The Melvins also toured briefly the United Kingdom in mid-December 2006. Two new songs entitled "Suicide in Progress" and "Billy Fish" were played during the 2007 tour, and appear on their next album Nude With Boots.

On June 16 and 17, 2008, a lineup of Osborne, original drummer Mike Dillard, and Dale Crover (playing bass) played two shows at the Great American Music Hall in San Francisco in honor of Jello Biafra's 50th birthday. Both sets were composed of songs from The Mangled Demos, a collection of early material released on the Alternative Tentacles record label in 2005.

In July 2008, their new album entitled Nude with Boots was released. In December 2008, along with Mike Patton, the Melvins co-curated an edition of the All Tomorrow's Parties Nightmare Before Christmas festival. They chose half of the lineup and also performed themselves.

The long rumored (since 2003) remix CD Chicken Switch was released on September 29, 2009, via Ipecac Recordings. Unlike usual remix CDs where the remixer is given a single track to work with, for Chicken Switch each remixer was given a full album to work with and pull from to create their track. Melvins joined with New Orleans' super group Down and Weedeater for a North American tour in the summer and fall of 2009. Melvins released their follow up to Nude with Boots, entitled The Bride Screamed Murder, on June 1, 2010.

=== Melvins Lite, reunion with Mike Dillard and more albums (2011–present) ===
Melvins started 2011 with a series of unique shows. Four of the shows were every Friday at Spaceland in California. January 7 featured the current line-up playing Colossus of Destiny, Lysol, and Eggnog. January 14 featured a Melvins 1983 set followed by the band playing Houdini. January 21 featured a two-piece Melvins set followed by the current lineup playing Bullhead. January 28 featured the band playing a normal set followed by Stoner Witch.

In early 2011 the band was on tour first in Christchurch, New Zealand at the time of the February 2011 Christchurch earthquake then in Tokyo, Japan at the time of the 2011 Tōhoku earthquake and tsunami. Melvins supported Slayer at the All Tomorrow's Parties 'I'll Be Your Mirror' festival at Alexandra Palace, London in May 2012. Melvins formed a lineup called Melvins Lite (Buzz, Dale, and Trevor Dunn) that toured through parts of 2011. This line-up released an album, Freak Puke, in June 2012 on Ipecac Recordings. The main four-piece lineup remains active as well and released a digital EP, The Bulls & the Bees, in March on Scion a/v.

In 2012, Melvins Lite completed a record-breaking tour, having performed every night for 51 straight days, once in each of the 50 United States and once in the District of Columbia. The tour started on September 5 in Anchorage, Alaska and ended in Honolulu, Hawaii on October 25, 2012.

Everybody Loves Sausages, an album of cover songs performed with special guests, was released by Ipecac on April 30, 2013.

In 2013, Melvins marked 30 years as a band with an extensive summer tour supported by Honky, Die Kreuzen and Negative Approach. Grunge pioneers Mudhoney also joined the band for two shows on the 30th anniversary tour. Rutmanis reconciled with his former bandmates, appearing on the 2013 album, Everybody Loves Sausages and a 2014 7" single.

Melvins were featured on the 2013, Joyful Noise Recordings flexi-series. On August 5, 2013, Melvins announced a new album, Tres Cabrones, featuring the "Melvins 1983" lineup with Osborne and Crover joined by the band's original drummer, Mike Dillard. Crover replaced Dillard in 1984 and plays bass on the album. Tres Cabrones was released on November 5, 2013, on the band's longtime label Ipecac.

Jeff Pinkus had aided the band in 2013 as a touring bassist, filling in for current member Jared Warren who was on paternity leave. Afterward Pinkus joined the Melvins full time to begin a collaboration with fellow Butthole Surfers guitarist Paul Leary. The collaborative album Hold It In was released in October 2014. The lineup for this album was Osborne and Crover joined by Paul Leary and Jeff Pinkus of the Butthole Surfers.

A collaboration with godheadSilo's Mike Kunka, Three Men and a Baby, was released in April 2016 through Sub Pop. The album, started in 1999 and shelved, was recently finished. Another album, Basses Loaded, was released in June 2016, which features a rotating cast of bass players including regulars Dale Crover, Jared Warren, Jeff Pinkus and Trevor Dunn as well as Steven McDonald (of Redd Kross), and Krist Novoselic (of Nirvana).

In July 2017, the band released the double album A Walk with Love & Death. One of the discs, Love, is a 14-song soundtrack to a short film of the same name, by Jesse Nieminen. The other disc, Death, is made up of standard Melvins songs.

The band released Pinkus Abortion Technician in April 2018. The album features dual bassists, Melvins' regular bass player Steven McDonald as well as Butthole Surfers' Jeff Pinkus. The title of the album resembles the Butthole Surfers album Locust Abortion Technician, and the album features a cover of the Butthole Surfers tune "Graveyard".

Melvins' 24th studio album, Working with God, was released on February 26, 2021, and once again includes the 1983 lineup of Osborne, Crover and Dillard reunited.

On July 21, 2021, it was announced that Melvins' would release a 36-song acoustic double album titled Five Legged Dog later in the year, featuring acoustic versions of songs spanning their career.

Also in 2021, Melvins were featured in the 25th anniversary of TapeOp with a feature interview.

On August 21, 2022, the Melvins surprise released their 26th studio album, titled Bad Mood Rising. The record was not announced beforehand and there were no singles, it just showed up on vinyl. The album arrived on streaming services on 30 September.

In August 2023, it was announced that former second drummer Coady Willis would be returning to the band for their 2023 US Tour, filling in for Crover as he undergoes spinal surgery.

Melvins announced their 27th album, titled Tarantula Heart, on February 6, 2024, with a release date of April 19. The lead single "Working the Ditch" was released that same day. The second single "Allergic to Food" was released on March 20.

In November 2024, Melvins announced a co-headlining spring 2025 US tour with Napalm Death, as a successor/sequel to their 2016 Savage Imperial Death March Tour. This was their first tour since 2016 to feature both Dale Crover and Coady Willis on drums, as Crover had to sit out their previous tour due to spinal surgery. Support includes Napalm Death bassist Shane Embury's side project Dark Sky Burial on all dates, as well as support from Weedeater, Titan To Tachyons, and Hard-Ons on select dates. Both bands also announced a collaboration album also titled Savage Imperial Death March, which was released on February 16, 2025 to coincide with the tour.

On February 17, 2025, Melvins released a single titled "Victory of the Pyramids" from their 28th studio album Thunderball. The album is their third to feature the Melvins 1983 lineup, the previous two being Tres Cabrones (2013) and Working with God (2021). The album was released on April 18.

== Musical style and influences ==
The Melvins have been variously described as a sludge metal, grunge, experimental rock, alternative metal, and alternative rock band. Other genres the band has explored include noise rock, stoner rock, doom metal, dark ambient, noise, jazz-rock, avant-garde music, electroacoustic music, and punk country. Initially starting out as a hardcore punk act, their sound eventually started to incorporate such influences as Flipper, Black Flag, Gang of Four, Blue Cheer, MC5, the Stooges, Pink Fairies, Budgie, Motörhead, Cheap Trick, Alice Cooper, David Bowie, Roxy Music, the Fugs, Swans, Public Image Ltd, Meat Puppets, Venom, Miles Davis, and the Who.

Since the 1990s, the band has occasionally touched on electronic music, as on Prick (1994), Colossus of Destiny (1998), Pigs of the Roman Empire (2004) – the latter a collaboration with dark ambient pioneer Lustmord, and Throbbing Jazz Gristle Funk Hits (2023). Though the band are often compared to Black Sabbath, Buzzo has stated that his guitar playing is more influenced by Black Flag.

== Legacy ==
Melvins' sludgy sound was an influence on grunge music, including bands such as Nirvana, Soundgarden, Green River, and many other bands from Seattle. They have also influenced artists outside the grunge scene, including Tool, Mike Patton of Mr. Bungle and Faith No More, Boris (who took their name from the title of a Melvins song), Pig Destroyer, Helmet, Full of Hell, Corey Taylor of Slipknot, Sleep, Earth, Sunn O))), Lamb of God, Mastodon, Neurosis, High on Fire, Baroness, Eyehategod and Isis. AllMusic wrote "their ability to combine punk with a strong Black Sabbath influence had a major impact on everything from grunge to alternative metal to doom metal and stoner rock." In 2017, Metal Injection ranked Melvins at number 2 on their list of "10 Heaviest Grunge Bands". In 2025, Jeff Mezydlo of Yardbarker included the band in his list of "20 underrated bands from the 1990s who are worth rediscovering".

== Band members ==
Current

- Buzz Osborne – guitars, lead vocals (1983–present)
- Dale Crover – drums, percussion, backing vocals (1984–present); bass (2008–2015, 2020)
- Steven Shane McDonald – bass, backing vocals (2015–present)
- Coady Willis – drums, backing vocals (2006–2015, 2023–present)

Former

- Mike Dillard – drums (1983–1984; 2008–2015, 2020, 2025)
- Matt Lukin – bass, backing vocals (1983–1987)
- Lori "Lorax" Black – bass (1987–1991, 1992–1993)
- Joe Preston – bass, backing vocals (1991–1992)
- Mark Deutrom – bass, guitars (1993–1998)
- Kevin Rutmanis – bass (1998–2005)
- Trevor Dunn – bass (2005, 2007, 2009; touring only); upright bass, backing vocals (2011–2015, with Melvins Lite)
- Jared Warren – bass, backing vocals (2006–2015)
- Jeff Pinkus – bass, backing vocals (2013–2019)

Touring

- Tom Flynn – bass (1990)
- Dave Sahijdak – bass (1993)
- Billy Anderson – bass (1993)
- David Scott Stone – guitars (2000–2001), bass (2004–2006)

== Discography ==
Studio albums

- Gluey Porch Treatments (1987)
- Ozma (1989)
- Bullhead (1991)
- Lysol (1992)
- Houdini (1993)
- Prick (1994)
- Stoner Witch (1994)
- Stag (1996)
- Honky (1997)
- The Maggot (1999)
- The Bootlicker (1999)
- The Crybaby (2000)
- Electroretard (2001)
- Hostile Ambient Takeover (2002)
- (A) Senile Animal (2006)
- Nude with Boots (2008)
- The Bride Screamed Murder (2010)
- Freak Puke (2012)
- Everybody Loves Sausages (2013)
- Tres Cabrones (2013)
- Hold It In (2014)
- Basses Loaded (2016)
- A Walk with Love & Death (2017)
- Pinkus Abortion Technician (2018)
- Working with God (2021)
- Five Legged Dog (2021)
- Bad Mood Rising (2022)
- Tarantula Heart (2024)
- Thunderball (2025)

Collaboration albums

- Pigs of the Roman Empire (2004) (with Lustmord)
- Never Breathe What You Can't See (2004) (with Jello Biafra)
- Sieg Howdy! (with Jello Biafra) (2005)
- Three Men and a Baby (2016) (with Mike Kunka)
- Throbbing Jazz Gristle Funk Hits (2023) (with Void Manes)
- Controlling Data for a Better Feeling Future (2023) (with Helms Alee)
- Savage Imperial Death March (2025) (with Napalm Death)
