= Prick (Melvins album) =

Studio album by Melvins
- Released: August 5, 1994
- Recorded: April 1994
- Genre: Experimental rock; sound collage; experimental
- Length: 43:31
- Label: Amphetamine Reptile
- Producer: Melvins

Melvins chronology
Houdini (1993)	Prick (1994)	Stoner Witch (1994)

Professional ratings
Review scores
Source	Rating
AllMusic	2.5/5 stars
Encyclopedia of Popular Music	1/5 stars
Select	3/5 stars

Prick is the sixth studio album by the Melvins which was released in 1994 through Amphetamine Reptile Records under the name ƧИIV⅃ƎM. It has been said that because the Melvins already had a contract with Atlantic Records, Prick was released with the band name in mirror writing.

== Background ==
The album displays a distinctly experimental quality, with an eclectic selection including field recordings, electronic effects and loops, band jam sessions, a stereotypical drum solo that segues into an archetypal heavy metal guitar solo, and a track that's introduced as "pure digital silence"—followed by silence for a minute. Singer/guitarist Buzz Osborne has stated that Prick is "a total noise crap record we did strictly for the weirdness factor. Complete and utter nonsense, a total joke."

The band claimed that they wanted to call the album Kurt Kobain but changed it after Cobain's death to eliminate the possibility of people mistaking it for a tribute record. They implied that Cobain, a friend and collaborator since their teenage years in rural Washington, was actually the titular "prick", because he died and therefore forced them to change the album's name.

Select called it an experimental collection of "noises, snippets and rhythm tracks overlaid with church bells, which under no account could be defined as influenced by Black Sabbath", particularly praising "Montreal" for being "four minutes of humming amps in front of a restless live audience chanting for Primus. They'd've cheered if it was Neil Young." Trouser Press critic Ira Robbins wrote: "Among the eleven formless tracks are newsreel interviews, acoustic and demi-electric jams that go until the tape runs out, ambient noise, church bells and anything else left lying around an English studio."

== Track listing ==
All songs written by The Melvins.

No.	Title	Length
1.	"How About"	4:15
2.	"Rickets"	1:20
3.	"Pick It n' Flick It"	1:39
4.	"Montreal"	4:09
5.	"Chief Ten Beers"	6:28
6.	"Underground"	2:19
7.	"Chalk People"	1:16
8.	"Punch the Lion"	3:14
9.	"Pure Digital Silence"	1:32
10.	"Larry"	2:59
11.	"Roll Another One"	14:20

== Personnel ==
- Mark D - producer
- Dale C - producer
- King B - producer

=== Additional personnel ===
- Konstantin Johannes - engineer
- Mackie Osborne - art
