= Eggnog (album) =

EP by Melvins
- Released: August 16, 1991
- Recorded: 1991
- Genre: Sludge metal; stoner metal; grunge
- Length: 20:17
- Label: Boner
- Producer: Jonathan Burnside and Billy Anderson

Melvins chronology
| Bullhead (1991) | Eggnog (1991) | Salad of a Thousand Delights (1992) |

Professional ratings
Review scores
| Source | Rating |
|---|---|
| AllMusic | 3/5 stars |

Eggnog is an EP by American sludge metal band Melvins. It was released in 1991 on Boner Records.

== Track listing ==
All tracks are written by Buzz Osborne.

Eggnog track listing
| No. | Title | Length |
|---|---|---|
| 1. | "Wispy" | 1:45 |
| 2. | "Antitoxidote" | 2:16 |
| 3. | "Hog Leg" | 3:24 |
| 4. | "Charmicarmicat" | 12:50 |
| Total length: | | 20:17 |

== Personnel ==
- King Buzzo – vocals, guitar
- Lorax – bass
- Dale – drums, backing vocals

=== Additional personnel ===
- Jonathan Burnside – engineer
- Billy Anderson – engineer
- Diana Berry – cover photos

== Legacy ==
A small sample from "Hog Leg" appeared in Beck's song "Beercan". King Buzzo also appears a couple of times in the song's video.
