= Stag (Melvins album) =

Studio album by Melvins
- Released: July 15, 1996
- Recorded: 1996
- Studios: Sound City (Los Angeles); A&M (Hollywood); Entourage; Falconer (London)
- Genres: Alternative metal; sludge metal; experimental
- Length: 50:56
- Label: Atlantic
- Producers: Melvins; GGGarth; Joe Barresi

Melvins chronology
Tora Tora Tora (1995)	Stag (1996)	Honky (1997)

Singles from Stag
- 1. "The Bit" Released: June 24, 1996; 2. "Bar-X the Rocking M" Released: 1996

Stag is the eighth studio album by American rock band Melvins, released in 1996 through Atlantic Records. This is the final album the band released under Atlantic before being dropped from the label. Promotional singles were released for the songs "The Bit" and "Bar-X the Rocking M", with the latter having a music video.

The record is noted for its experimental, varied content, including elements of drone, ambient, country and instruments including sitar and trombone.

== Composition ==
According to Spin writer Andrew Earles, Stag leans heavier on "Beefheartian sonic-fuckery" than its two predecessors, as it is "full of sitar jams, spasmodic trombone solos, dark ambient interludes, chipmunk punk, drone-gaze, cottonmouth country, and the comically slow doom-metal lurch of 'Lacrimosa'." According to Ira Robbins, the album is eclectic and humorous, comprising "the inaugural sitar, the wailing trombone on 'Bar-X the Rocking M', the unabashed pop vigor of 'Black Bock', the munchkin gimmickry of 'Skin Horse' and the shocking acoustic blues of 'Cottonmouth.'" Music critic Chris Ott wrote that Stag was "incessantly marketed as an 'experimental' LP, and for once-- barring the horn-filled alterna-single "Bar-X-The Rocking M"—the majors were right." He also noted the album's wide array of ideas and variety, including the sitar-laden "The Bit" and continuing through "the ambient guitar work in 'Hide' and the celebrated 'Lacrimosa' to more expected stoner stomps 'The Bloat' and 'Cottonmouth'."

While noting that the song "Lacrimosa" harks back to earlier Melvins material with its slow beats, Sia Michel believes that Stag's "main points of reference" are the more progressive rock-leaning moments from its predecessor, Stoner Witch (1994). She compares "Soup" to post-rock, describes "Captain Pungent" as "[skipping] to Munchkin land", and deems "Black Bock" to be "perverted country-pop" with a 'la-la-la' chorus. Reviewer Tom Cox noted tracks of "Led Zep ambience surfing between songs", and noted that "Black Bock" is a "peculiar song" that is comparable to a hard rock Ween. Ned Raggett called Stag a departure from Melvins' earlier work, as made evident from the "repeating sitar-into-guitar-chord" album intro. He comments on "Bar X the Rocking M" matching guitar riffs with horns and scratching, while he calls "Buck Owens" a "mini-prog epic" with shifting time signatures and "a mid-section trip-out". Stag is further characterized, Raggett adds, by the gentle guitar chime of "Hide" and the "weird, sparkly drones and burbles" of "Soup".

== Critical reception ==
Professional ratings
Review scores
Source	Rating
AllMusic	4/5 stars
Collector's Guide to Heavy Metal	8/10
Encyclopedia of Popular Music	3/5 stars
NME	2/10
Spin	6/10

Sia Michel of Spin, in her contemporary review of Stag, commented on the album's "prog-ier" material and believed that, despite Melvins having landed concert dates with Kiss and support from a major collaborator of Traci Lords, the group were "flipping off every hairfarmer lured by their earlier work's comparatively straightforward crunch." NME reviewer Tom Cox favourably named it a "hugely depraved album" that "makes Rancid sound about as hardcore as moist fishfingers", but nevertheless criticised it for being "totally unlistenable and slightly more metal than the Pompidou Centre. This is, to all intents and purposes, what Metallica sounds like to your Great Aunt."

Retrospectively, Ira Robbins of Trouser Press considers it an improvement over Stoner Witch, "bringing back the spunk and leavening the behemoth metal snarl with variety and humor". He added that as the group ceased to be "confined to a single design", they "spread their wings and drop a fat sky patty all over rock's ugly landscape." Ned Raggett of AllMusic praises the album's singularity, calling it unlike "anything the Melvins had yet recorded to that point" while also pointing to the variation that characterised the band's later work. He believes that some songs are "at once a mind-f*ck and something that makes total sense", and praises Osborne's vocals ("and various treatments thereupon"), "ranging from dreamy float and gentle croon to rasping roar, paralleling Stag's overall emphasis on trying anything at least once to see what works." In The Rough Guide to Rock (1999), Bruce Laidlaw believes that, with regards to Melvins eschewing metal for obscure outside influences, Stag "upped the ante still further" beyond Stoner Witch. He comments that "folded into the sound recipe are, among other ingredients, trombone solos, fuzz-tone drums, and vocal tracks tweaked at 78 rpm. All the while, they out-rock, out-metal and outrage the competition."

In 2003, Chris Ott of Pitchfork ranked Stag at number 42 in his list of CDs common in second-hand stores. Ott believes that Stag is "a shockingly great used bin find", one which "detonates a twenty thousand-megaton bomb of ideas, its shrapnel scattered across 16 sprawling tracks." He commented that Melvins submitted the album to Atlantic during the label's "dire 90s drought", noting that they "nearly folded after the failure of their 'alternative' acts and Hootie & The Blowfish's Fairweather Johnson". In 2013, Andrew Earles of Spin ranked Stag at number 11 in its list of the "40 Weirdest Post-Nevermind Major Label Albums", commenting that Melvins' three albums for Atlantic marked their creative peak. Earles commented that Buzz Osborne "had to get the Melvins dropped by letting their rep know it was okay to go ahead with the inevitable...via answering machine." The Quietus critic JR Moores contends that Stag "remains one of the weirdest rock albums ever to appear on a major label."

== Track listing ==
All lyrics by Buzz Osborne unless noted.

No.	Title	Lyrics	Music	Length
1.	"The Bit"		Dale Crover	4:45
2.	"Hide" (instrumental)		Osborne	0:50
3.	"Bar-X the Rocking M"		Crover, Mark Deutrom, Osborne	2:24
4.	"Yacobs Lab" (instrumental)		Deutrom	1:17
5.	"The Bloat"		Osborne	3:41
6.	"Tipping the Lion"		Osborne	3:48
7.	"Black Bock"		Osborne	2:43
8.	"Goggles"		Crover, Deutrom, Osborne	6:30
9.	"Soup" (instrumental)		Crover, Deutrom, Osborne	2:39
10.	"Buck Owens"		Osborne	3:11
11.	"Sterilized"		Crover, Deutrom, Osborne	3:30
12.	"Lacrimosa"	Deutrom	Crover, Deutrom, Osborne	4:40
13.	"Skin Horse"		Osborne	5:16
14.	"Captain Pungent"		Osborne	2:21
15.	"Berthas"		Osborne	1:25
16.	"Cottonmouth"	Crover	Crover	1:56

== Personnel ==
- King Buzzo – guitar & vocals; all instrumentation (2), backing vocals (7), moog (9), bass (11), drums (12), interlude guitar (13); engineer, producer & mixer (1–3 & 5–15)
- Mark D – bass; additional guitar (1, 3, 6, 7), all instrumentation (4), slide guitar (5), backing vocals (7), moog & drum beat (9), guitar (11, 12), vocals (12), interlude guitar, baritone guitar & piano (all 13); engineer, producer & mixer (1 & 3–15)
- Dale C – drums & percussion; additional guitar & sitar (1), bongos & backing vocals (7), moog (9), guitar (11), all instrumentation & vocals (16); engineer, producer & mixer (1, 3 & 5–16)

with

- Dirty Walt – valve trombone (3)
- Mac Mann – organ & grand piano (3)
- Bill Bartell – guitar (11)
- Mackie Osborne – drums (12); illustration & design

=== Additional personnel ===
- GGGarth – engineer, producer & mixer (1, 3, 5–7, 9, 10, 13–15); backing vocals (7)
- Joe Barresi – engineer, producer & mixer (1, 3, 5–7, 9, 10, 13–15)
- Alex Newport – engineer, producer & mixer (8)
- Chris Kozlowski – engineer, producer & mixer (11)
- Stephen Marcussen – mastering
- Ron Boustead – mastering
- David Lefkowitz – management & fan club

== Charts ==
=== Album ===
Billboard (North America)

Year	Chart	Position
1996	Heatseekers	33
