= Stoner Witch =

Studio album by Melvins
- Released: October 18, 1994
- Recorded: 1994
- Studio: A&M (Hollywood)
- Genres: Grunge; stoner rock; sludge metal; stoner metal; alternative metal; alternative rock
- Length: 49:47
- Label: Atlantic
- Producers: Melvins; GGGarth

Melvins chronology
Prick (1994)	Stoner Witch (1994)	Tora Tora Tora (1995)

Singles from Stoner Witch
- 1. "Queen" Released: September 26, 1994; 2. "Revolve" Released: 1994

Stoner Witch is the seventh studio album by American rock band Melvins, released on October 18, 1994, by Atlantic Records. It is their second release for the label.

== Recording ==
The album was recorded with Garth "GGGarth" Richardson and Joe Barresi in 19 days at the A&M Studios in Hollywood. Most of the tracks were captured in a single take, and all of the tracking and mastering was completed in a single, continuous session.

The title comes from a term that drummer Dale Crover and his friends used to describe "the stoner chicks" at their high school.

== Music and composition ==
Described as a grunge, stoner rock, stoner metal and sludge metal album, Stoner Witch melds hallmarks of the band's earlier work, such as "molten tempos and guitarist Buzz Osborne's nonsensical lyrics" with a relatively radio-friendly ear towards arrangements. According to AllMusic's Patrick Kennedy, the album picks up on the "basic framework of Houdini, resolving into an ear-catching workup of classic rock themes, tempered, of course, with a fairly judicious sampling of acid-trip detours." Grant Alden of Rolling Stone noted that "many of the songs are built around conventional metal structures." Treblezine's Paul Pearson described the record as "the Aberdeen band's happiest album, which is meant to say they took it upon themselves to reconstruct classic rock and metal themes and run them through their typically hazy filter." Peter Buckley, the author of The Rough Guide to Rock, wrote that the record showcases the band's "dual allegiances to industrial noise and Southern rock."

== Release and critical reception ==
Professional ratings
Review scores
Source	Rating
AllMusic	4/5 stars
Collector's Guide to Heavy Metal	7/10
Kerrang!	4/5 stars
Rolling Stone	4/5 stars
Select	3/5 medals
Spin	0.5/1 star
The Village Voice	C

Upon its initial release, Stoner Witch sold approximately 50,000 units, with particularly strong sales in New York City and Seattle.

AllMusic critic Patrick Kennedy wrote: "Where Houdini resided more in an expansive—though lugubriously heavy—metal vein, refining the techniques built up through the band's early struggles, Stoner Witch truly showcases the band at the apex of their wide-ranging creative abilities." Rolling Stone's Grant Alden stated: "Oddly enough, the Melvins don't really have to contend. They seem quite content simply being, doing what they do." Robert Christgau of The Village Voice, who gave the album a C rating, wrote: "They're always slow, always ugly, always protodeath, always protoindustrial. And always slow. Faster here, actually, up to Sabbath speed at times, with nine minutes of din at the end to shore up their cred."

== Legacy ==
Decibel magazine inducted Stoner Witch on its Hall of Fame. Spin listed the album as number 9 on its list of "The 20 Greatest Grunge Albums of All Time". The album was also featured on Treblezine's lists of "The 30 Best Grunge Albums" and "10 Essential Stoner Rock Albums".

Largely out of print since the 1990s, the album was reissued in 2016 through Third Man Records.

== Track listing ==
All words written by Buzz Osborne and music written by the Melvins (Dale Crover, Mark Deutrom, and Osborne), except where noted.

No.	Title	Writer(s)	Length
1.	"Skweetis"		1:12
2.	"Queen"	Words: Crover, Osborne - Music: Osborne	3:06
3.	"Sweet Willy Rollbar"	Words/Music: Osborne	1:28
4.	"Revolve"	Words: Osborne - Music: Deutrom, Osborne	4:44
5.	"Goose Freight Train"		4:38
6.	"Roadbull"		3:25
7.	"At the Stake"		7:56
8.	"Magic Pig Detective"	Words/Music: Osborne	5:33
9.	"Shevil"	Words/Music: Osborne	6:29
10.	"June Bug"	Music: Deutrom, Osborne	2:01
11.	"Lividity"		9:15
Total length:			49:47

== Personnel ==
Melvins

- King Buzzo – lead vocals, guitar and bass
- Mark D – bass, guitar and backing vocals
- Dale C – drums, guitar and backing vocals

Additional personnel

- GGGarth – producer
- Joe Barresi – engineer
- Geetus Guido South Aguto – assistant engineer
- Mike "Elvis" Smith – assistant engineer
- The Magic Eight Ball – spiritual guidance
- Scott Humphrey – door squeaking and pencil sharpening
- Paul Dicarli – digital editing, back cracking and Moog
- David Lefkowitz – management
- Mackie Osborne – art direction
- Annalisa – photography
