= Mark Deutrom =

American musician

Mark William Deutrom is an American musician, composer, songwriter, and producer, best known as the guitarist for the punk rock band Clown Alley in the 1980s, and as the bassist for the multi-genre rock band Melvins from 1993 to 1998.

== Career ==
In the early 1980s, Deutrom was a member of a Los Angeles-based art co-op called Werkgruppe founded by D. Emily Hicks and Daniel Joseph Martinez. Lori Black was also a member. Deutrom contributed several multichannel soundtracks for Hicks' and Martinez's conceptual pieces culminating in a 23 channel synthetic audio environment for the 1984 Olympics Arts Festival installation entitled "The Peoples of Los Angeles". The piece included multiplex holograms of individuals from Los Angeles reciting soundtracks of their experiences in the region against a constantly shifting holographic audio ambience. Other collaborators included physicist and holographer Lloyd Cross, holographer Sharon McCormack, artist Abbe Don and musician Chili Charles. The exhibition was held at the University of Southern California Atelier Gallery in Santa Monica. A catalog was published that included 3-D glasses. "The Peoples of Los Angeles" was reviewed in The Los Angeles Herald Examiner. It was also reviewed in the Los Angeles Times.

In 1993, following the release of their album Houdini, Deutrom joined the Melvins as bass player. He had worked with the band previously, producing and engineering the early releases Gluey Porch Treatments and Ozma. He appears on the 1994 albums Prick and Stoner Witch, the 1996 album Stag and Honky in 1997. During his tenure in the Melvins, they toured with acts such as Rush and Nine Inch Nails. Mark Deutrom left the band in early 1998 to pursue other projects. In 2000, he released his first solo album, The Silent Treatment, which was reissued in 2018.

Deutrom played with the drone metal band Sunn O))) for several shows in 2006.

== Alchemy Records ==
Alchemy Records was an American independent record label, founded in the San Francisco Bay Area in 1985 by musicians Mark Deutrom and Victor Hayden that was active until 1989. The Melvins' debut album, Gluey Porch Treatments, was released on the label.
