= Ipecac Recordings =

American record label

- Founded: 1999
- Founder: Mike Patton, Greg Werckman
- Distributors: RED (US), PIAS (worldwide), Fontana (Canada)
- Genre: Rock; experimental; art; electronic; heavy metal; hip-hop
- Country of origin: United States
- Location: California
- Official website: www.ipecac.com

Ipecac Recordings is an independent record label based in California. It was founded on April 1, 1999, by Greg Werckman (ex-label manager of Alternative Tentacles, ex-lead singer of DUH, ex-employee of Mercury Records) and Mike Patton (Faith No More, Mr. Bungle, Fantômas, Tomahawk, Peeping Tom, and Mondo Cane) in Alameda, California.

Originally, the label was created for the sole purpose of releasing the first Fantômas album. It has since distributed music by artists such as Melvins, Oxbow and Isis, as well as several of Patton's other projects and collaborations.

The label is named after syrup of ipecac, an emetic, or vomit-inducing, medicine. Its slogan is "Ipecac Recordings—Making People Sick Since 1999".

== Business practices ==
Ipecac is distinguished from most labels (independent labels included) by their policy of signing bands to only one-album contracts, as opposed to most other labels whose contractual agreements usually consist of a multiple-album agreements. Werckman claims that "when starting our label we decided that it did not feel right to 'own' the artists on our label. Instead we would rent or license records from artists that we liked." "Lawyers or businesspeople call us morons for only doing one-record deals," Werckman scoffs. "They say, 'You're not really anything, then.' Well, we like our catalogue. We like the records we put out. Our bands aren't rushing away. Our job isn't to own any artist. We're here to put out the art that people create." Low overhead and no video or promotional cost partnered with very little distribution costs allow for hearty royalties. "Every six months I send those guys royalty checks," Werckman says. "It's great. It's the way it should be. Even bands that are very successful — when they get royalty checks from us, they're stunned."

Ipecac has offices in California.

== Artists released on Ipecac Recordings ==
- Beak
- The Bobby Lees
- Bohren & Der Club of Gore
- The Book of Knots
- Circus Devils
- Crystal Fairy
- Imani Coppola
- Curse of the Golden Vampire
- Dalek (visual artist) / HAZE XXL (Tom Hazelmyer)
- Dälek (musicians)
- Daughters
- The Desert Sessions
- DJ Eddie Def
- Dub Trio
- East West Blast Test
- End
- eX-Girl
- Faith No More (Distribution only)
- Fantômas
- Fantômas Melvins Big Band
- Farmers Market
- Flat Earth Society
- Gangpol & Mit
- General Patton / The X-Ecutioners
- Ghostigital
- The Golding Institute
- Goon Moon
- Guapo
- Neil Hamburger
- Hella
- Zach Hill
- Isis
- The Jesus Lizard
- Kaada
- Kaada/Patton
- Eyvind Kang
- kid606
- The Kids of Widney High
- Le Butcherettes
- The Locust
- The Lucky Stars
- Lustmord
- MadLove
- Maldoror
- Mark Lanegan & Duke Garwood
- Mclusky
- Melvins
- Messer Chups
- Mr. Bungle
- Moistboyz
- Mondo Generator
- Mondo Cane
- Ennio Morricone
- Mouse On Mars
- Mugison
- Mutation
- Northern State
- Orthrelm
- Oxbow
- Palms
- Peeping Tom
- Phantomsmasher
- Pink Anvil
- Planet B
- Queens of the Stone Age (Vinyl distribution only)
- Qui
- Brian Reitzell
- Omar Rodríguez-López
- Ruins
- Sax Ruins
- Sensational
- Spotlights
- Skeleton Key
- Sleaford Mods
- Steroid Maximus
- Retox
- Rob Swift
- Tanya Tagaq
- The Tango Saloon
- Tipsy
- Tomahawk
- Trevor Dunn's Trio-Convulsant
- Unsane
- Valve
- Jean-Claude Vannier
- Venomous Concept
- Vincent & Mr. Green
- Otto Von Schirach
- The Young Gods
- Yoshimi and Yuka
- Zu

== See also ==
- Ipecac Recordings discography
- List of record labels
