= Amphetamine Reptile Records discography =

Amphetamine Reptile Records
- Founded: 1986
- Founder: Tom Hazelmyer
- Distributor: Twin/Tone Records
- Genre: Punk rock Alternative rock
- Country of origin: United States
- Location: Minneapolis, Minnesota
- Official website: amphetaminereptile.com

Amphetamine Reptile Records is an American record label founded in 1986 by American musician Tom Hazelmyer.

== List of releases ==
=== United States Discography ===
No.	The release's unique catalog number. These are formatted as AmRep 000.
CS	Cassette tape
CD	Compact disc
LP	Long play

No.	Year	Artist	Title	Format
001	1991	Cows	Peacetika	CS
002	1991	Halo of Flies	Music for Insect Minds	CD
003	1991	Helios Creed	Lactating Purple	CD, CS, LP
004	1991	Tar	Jackson	CD, CS, LP
005	1991	Cosmic Psychos	Blokes You Can Trust	CD, CS, LP
006	1991	God Bullies	War on Everybody	CD, CS
007	1991	Cows	Cunning Stunts	CD, CS, LP
008	1990	Various artists	Dope-Guns-'N-Fucking in the Streets Volumes 4-7	CD, CS, LP
009	1992	Vertigo	Ventriloquist	CD, CS, LP
010	1992	Helios Creed	Kiss to the Brain	CD, CS, LP
011	1992	Cosmic Psychos	Down on the Farm & Cosmic Psychos	CD
012	1992	Hammerhead	Ethereal Killer	CD, CS
013	1992	X	Noise Archives Volume 1: X - "Aspirations"	CD
014	1993	Janitor Joe	Big Metal Birds	CD, CS
015	1993	Cows	Sexy Pee Story	CD, CS
016	1993	Helmet	Born Annoying 7" - 1989	CD
017	1993	Boss Hog	Girl +	CD, LP
018	1993	Surgery	Trim, 9th Ward High Roller	CD, CS, LP
019	1993	Cosmic Psychos	Palomino Pizza	CD, CS, LP
020	1993	Chokebore	Motionless	CD, CS, LP
021	1993	Vertigo	Nail Hole	CD, CS
022	1993	Today Is the Day	Supernova	CD, CS, LP
023	1993	Guzzard	Get a Witness	CD, CS
024	1993	Hammerhead	Evil Twin	CD, CS
025	1994	Today Is the Day - Guzzard - Chokebore	Clusterfuck '94	CD
026	1994	Hammerhead	Into the Vortex	CD, CS, LP
027	1994	Janitor Joe	Lucky	CD, CS
028	1994	Cows	Orphan's Tragedy	CD, CS
029	1994	S.W.A.T.	Deep Inside a Cop's Mind	CD, CS, LP
030	1994	The Crows	The Crows	CD
031	1994	Melvins	Prick	CD, CS, LP
032	1994	Helios Creed	Planet X	CD, CS
033	1994	Today Is the Day	Willpower	CD, LP
034	1995	Chokebore	Anything Near Water	CD, CS, LP
035	1995	Love 666	American Revolution	CD, LP
036	1995	Helmet	Born Annoying	CD, CS, LP
037	1995	Guzzard	Quick, Fast, In a Hurry	CD, CS, LP
038	1995	Cosmic Psychos	Self Totalled	CD, LP
039	1995	Unsane	Scattered, Smothered & Covered	CD, CS, LP
040	1995	Supernova	Ages 3 and Up	LP
041	1995	Gaunt	Yeah, Me Too	CD, LP
042	1996	Hammerhead	Duh, The Big City	CD
043	1996	Various artists	Screwed: Original Motion Picture Soundtrack	CD
044	1996	Various artists	Operation: Break Even	CD
045	1996	Urinals	Negative Capability...Check It Out!	CD
046	1996	Today Is the Day	Today Is the Day	CD, CS, LP
047	1996	Cows	Old Gold 1989–1991	CD, CS
048	1996	Love 666	Please Kill Yourself So I Can Rock	CD, LP
049	1996	lowercase	All Destructive Urges... Seem So Perfect	CD, CS
050	1996	Cows	Whorn	CD, CS, LP
051	1996	Lollipop	Dog Piss on Dog	CD
052	1996	Guzzard	The Alienation Index Survey	CD
053	1997	Various artists	Dope-Guns-'N-Fucking in the Streets Volumes 8-11	CD
054	1996	Chokebore	A Taste for Bitters	CD
055	1997	The Thrown Ups	Seven Years Golden	CD
056	1996	feedtime	Billy	CD, CS, LP
057	1996	Gnomes of Zurich	33rd Degree Burns	CD, LP
058	1996	Servotron	No Room for Humans	CD, LP
059	1997	lowercase	Kill the Lights	CD, LP
060	1997	Calvin Krime	Dress for the Future	CD, LP
061	1997	Mog Stunt Team	King of the Retards	CD
062	1997	Servotron	Spare Parts	CD
063	1997	Melvins	Singles 1-12	CD
064	1997	Melvins	Honky	CD, LP
065	1997	Cosmic Psychos	Oh What a Lovely Pie	CD
066	1998	Cows	Sorry in Pig Minor	CD, LP
067	1997	Freedom Fighters	My Scientist Friends	CD
068	1997	Lollipop	Sucked In, Blown Out	CD
069	1997	Nashville Pussy	Let Them Eat Pussy	CD, CS, LP
070	1998	Supernova	Rox	CD
071	1998	Calvin Krime	You're Feeling So Attractive	CD, LP
072	1998	Melvins	Alive at the Fucker Club	CD, LP
073	2008	The Heroine Sheiks	Journey to the End of the Knife	CD
074	2008	Melvins	Melvins vs. Minneapolis	CD
075	2009	Halo of Flies	Gay Witch Abortion Sessions	CD, LP
076	2010	White Drugs	Gold Magic	CD, LP
077	2010	Melvins	Hurray for Me Fuk You	LP
078	2011	Melvins	The Bride Screamed Murder	LP
079	2011	Hammerhead	Anarcho Retardist Terror Exhibit	LP
082	2011	Seawhores	The Hunt Is On	LP
083	2011	Melvins	Endless Residency	CD
084	2011	Melvins	Endless Residency	CD
085	2011	Melvins	Endless Residency	CD
086	2011	Melvins	Endless Residency	CD
087	2012	Melvins	1983	CD, LP
088	2012	Melvins	The Bulls & the Bees	LP
089	2012	Melvins Lite	Freak Puke	LP
090	2012	Melvins & Redd Kross	New Years Eve Ball Room Blitz	LP
091	2013	Hepa-Titus	Follow Me	LP
092	2013	Various artists	Bash 13	CD, LP
093	2013	Gay Witch Abortion With Haze XXL	Snakes Behind the Eyes	LP
094	2014	King Buzzo	This Machine Kills Artists	LP
095	2014	No Anchor - Haze XXL	No Anchor With Haze XXL	LP
096	2014	King Buzzo	This Machine Kills Artists - Volume 3	LP
097	1995	Various artists	AmRep Motors (1995 Models)	CD
098	2014	Hepa-Titus	Gettin' It On	LP
099	2014	Cows	Stunning Cunts	LP
100	2014	Melvins	Bride of Frankenstein	LP
101	2015	Cows	Stunning Cunts, Vol. 2	LP
102	2015	Melvins/Le Butcherettes	Chaos as Usual	CD, LP
103	2015	Gay Witch Abortion with Haze XXL	Beer Hippy	CD, LP
104	2015	Melvins	Beer Hippy	CD, CS, LP
105	2016	Various artists	Dope-Guns-'N-Fucking in the Streets Volumes 4-7	CD, LP
106	2016	Melvins	War Pussy	LP
107	2016	Boss Hog	Drinkin', Lechin' & Lyin'	LP
108	2016	Various artists	Psychopticotic Vol. One	LP
109	2016	Hepa-Titus	FM Warm Weather	LP
110	2016	Melvins · Off! · Redd Kross	High Desert Overdose	LP
111	2016	Teenage Jesus and the Jerks	Teenage Jesus and the Jerks	LP
112	2017	Crystal Fairy	Crystal Fairy	LP
113	2017	Cows	Taint Pluribus Taint Unum	CD, LP
114	2017	Cherubs	Heroin Man	CD, LP
115	2017	Lydia Lunch	Queen of Siam	CD, CS, LP
116	2017	Various artists	Bash 17	CD, LP
117	2017	Melvins	Steven McDonald	LP
118	2017	feedtime	Billy	LP
119	2017	Melvins	Gluey Porch Treatments	LP
120	2018	Cows	Effete and Impudent Snobs	LP
121	2018	Hammerhead	Into the Vortex	LP
122	2018	Melvins	Pinkus Abortion Technician	CD, LP
123	2018	Melvins	A Walk with Love & Death	LP
124	2018	Melvins	Sabbath	CD, LP
125	2018	God Bullies	Mama Womb Womb	CD, LP
126	2018	Various artists	Dope-Guns-'N-Fucking in the Streets Fourteen	LP
127	2019	Melvins/Flipper	Hot Fish	CD, LP
128	2019	Melvins/ShitKid	Bangers	CD, LP
129	2019	Melvins/Redd Kross	Escape From LA	CD, LP
130	2019	White Drugs	Harlem	LP
131	2019	mr.phylzzz	Penitent Curtis	CD
132	2020	Seawhores	The Last Temptation of Supper	LP
133	2020	King Buzzo	Six Pack	CD, LP
134	2020	Melvins	Electroretard	CD, LP
135	2020	Melvins/Mudhoney	White Lazy Boy	CD

=== Singles Discography ===
No.	The release's unique catalog number. These are formatted as Scale 000.
7"	7 inch single
12"	12 inch single
CD	Compact disc

No.	Year	Artist	Title	Format
2	1986	Halo of Flies	Rubber Room	7"
3	1986	Halo of Flies	Snapping Black Roscoe Bottles	7"
4	1987	Halo of Flies	Circling the Pile That Sits By Your Minds Eye Insect Karma Is Based on It	7"
5	1987	The Thrown Ups	Felch	7"
6	1987	Halo of Flies	Richies Dog	7"
7	1987	The Thrown Ups	Smiling Panties	7"
8	1988	The U-Men	Freezebomb	7"
9	1988	Halo of Flies	Four From the Bottom	CS
10	1988	The Thrown Ups	Eat My Dump	7"
11	1988	God Bullies	Fear and Pain	7"
12	1988	Various artists	Dope-Guns-'N-Fucking in the Streets Volume One	7"
13	1988	Halo of Flies	No Time	7"
14	1988	Lonely Moans	Rockinerd	7"
15	1988	Pogo the Clown	Lederhosen	7"
16	1989	Various artists	Dope-Guns-'N-Fucking in the Streets Volume Two	7"
17	1989	Surgery	"Not Going Down"/"Blow Her Face"	7"
18	1989	Various artists	Dope-Guns-'N-Fucking in the Streets Volume Three	7"
19	1989	Halo of Flies	Death of a Fly	7"
20	1989	Bush Pig	Bush Pig	7"
21	1989	Vertigo	"Bad Syd"/"Going to Pieces"	7"
22	1989	Helmet	Born Annoying	7"
23	1990	Various artists	Dope-Guns-'N-Fucking in the Streets Volume Four	7"
24	1990	Killdozer Featuring Tom Hazelmyer	"Short Eyes"/"Her Mother's Sorrow"	7"
25	1990	Tar	"Flow Plow"/"Hand"	7"
26	1990	The Thrown Ups	Melancholy Girlhole Box	7"
27	1990	Surgery	"Feedback"/"Fried"	7"
28	1990	Various artists	Dope-Guns-'N-Fucking in the Streets Volume Five	7"
29	1990	Casus Belli	"Punishment"	7"
30	1990	Cows	"Slap Back"	7"
31	1990	God Bullies	"Join Satan's Army"	7"
32	1991	Gear Jammer	"Two Tons of Chrome"	7"
33	1991	Helios Creed	"The Warming"	7"
34	1991	Various artists	Ugly American Overkill Tour E.P.	7"
35	1991	Halo of Flies	Big Mod Hate Trip	7"
36	1991	Mudhoney Versus Halo of Flies	Mod Showdown!	7"
37	1991	Various artists	Dope-Guns-'N-Fucking in the Streets Volume Six	7"
38	1991	Vertigo	"Rub"	7"
39	1991	Boss Hog	Action Box	7"
40	1991	The Crows	"Crow Bar"/"Low Brow"	7"
41	1991	Helmet	"Unsung"	7"
42	1991	Hammerhead	"U.V."/"Peep"	7"
43	1991	Various artists	Dope-Guns-'N-Fucking in the Streets Volume Seven	7"
44	1992	Melvins	"Night Goat"	7"
45	1992	Surgery	"Little Debbie"	7"
46	1992	Hammerhead	"Load King"	7"
47	1992	Helmet	"In the Meantime"	7"
48	1992	The Powers That Be	"Crude Sound"/"The Morning After"	7"
49	1992	Mama Tick	"Hatefest"/"Breathe Out"	7"
50	1992	Cows	"Plowed"	7"
51	1992	Janitor Joe	"Bullethead"/"KCL"	7"
52	1993	Casus Belli	"Return to Zero"/"Bug Fights"	7"
53	1993	Vertigo	"Driver #43"	7"
54	1993	Chokebore	"Nobody"/"Throats To Hit"	7"
55	1993	Helmet	"Primitive"	7"
56	1993	Today Is the Day	"I Bent Scared"/"Come on Down and Get Saved"	7"
57	1993	Hedonists	"Womb"/"Deepest Secret Fear"	7"
58	1993	Guzzard	"Glued"	7"
59	1993	Whopping Big Naughty	"Your Not Coming"	7"
60	1993	Various artists	Clusterfuck	7"
61	1993	Hammerhead	"Evil Twin"	7"
62	1993	Janitor Joe	"Stinker"	7"
63	1994	Gear Jammer	"Horsepower 2000"	7"
64	1994	Various artists	Dope-Guns-'N-Fucking in the Streets Volume Eight	7"
65	1994	Cows	"Cow Island"	7"
66	1994	S.W.A.T.	The Soundtrack to the New Police State	7"
67	1994	Love 666	"XTC"	7"
68	1994	Various artists	Dope-Guns-'N-Fucking in the Streets Volume Nine	7"
69	1994	Party Diktator	"Stand Behind Me"/"Quiet Line (Single Version)"	7"
70	1994	Hammerhead	"Duh, The Big City"	7"
71	1995	Chokebore	"Thin As Clouds"/"Pink Deluxe"	7"
72	1995	Halo of Kitten/Hammerhead	Porn 1	7"
73	1995	Various artists	Dope-Guns-'N-Fucking in the Streets Volume Ten	7"
74	1995	Melvins/Guv'ner	Porn 2	7"
75	1995	Silver Salute	"Happy Eyes"	7"
76	1995	Mudhoney/Strapping Fieldhands	Porn 2	7"
77	1995	Lollipop	Half Dead	7"
78	1995	lowercase	"Cadence"	7"
79	1995	Boss Hog/Cows	Porn 4	7"
80	1996	Gnomes of Zurich	"Dispenser"	7"
81	1996	Silver Salute	"No Clue"/"What's New?"	7"
82	1997	Melvins	"Lexicon Devil"/"Pigtro"	7"
83	1997	Melvins	"In the Rain"/"Spread Eagle Beagle"	7"
84	1997	Melvins	"Leech"/"Queen"	7"
85	1997	Melvins	"Way of the World"/"Theme"	7"
86	1997	Melvins	"It's Shoved"/"Forgotten Principles"	7"
87	1997	Melvins	"GGIIBBYY"/"Theresa Screams"	7"
88	1997	Melvins	"Poison"/"Double Troubled"	7"
89	1997	Melvins	"Specimen"/"All at Once"	7"
90	1997	Melvins	"Jacksonville"/"Dallas"	7"
91	1997	Melvins	"The Bloat"/"Fast Forward"	7"
92	1997	Melvins	"Nasty Dogs Funky Kings"/"HDYF"	7"
93	1996	Servotron	There Is No Santa Claus!	7"
94	1997	Various artists	Dope-Guns-'N-Fucking in the Streets Volume Eleven	7"
95	1997	Melvins/Brutal Truth	"How-++-Harry Lauders Walking Stick Tree"/"Zodiac"	7"
96	1997	TAD	"Obscene Hand"	7"
97	1998	Thee Headcoats/Lollipop	"I Wanna Get Fucked"/"Go to Hell"	7"
98	1999	The Heroine Sheiks	"(We Are The)"	7"
99	2001	Lifter Puller	"4Dix"	7"
100	2000	Melvins	"Spit It Out"	7"
101	2001	Melvins	"Shit Sandwich"	7"
102	2002	Billy Childish	"Evidence Against Myself"/"I Am the Strange Hero of Hunger"	7"
103	2004	Melvins	"Message Saved"/"Thank You!"	7"
104	2006	Melvins	"Pigskin"/"Starve Already"	7"
105	2006	Haze XXL	Dalek: A Purge of Dissidents V.1	7"
106	2007	Haze XXL	Dalek: A Purge of Dissidents V.2	7"
107	2007	Halo of Flies	"F.T.W."	7"
108	2007	Haze XXL	Dalek: A Purge of Dissidents V.3	7"
109	2007	Melvins	Smash the State	7"
110	2007	Melvins/Halo of Flies	Split Tour	7"
111	2007	Wild Billy Childish & The Musicians of the British Empire/Halo of Flies	"Taking Orders From the U.S.A."/"The Monster You Made"	7"
112	2008	Lydia Lunch with Halo of Flies	"When I'm Loaded"/"Crawl 'N Cry"	7"
113	2008	Halo of Flies	"A New Kind of Hate"	7"
114	2008	Melvins	"Star Spangled Banner"/"Detroit Rock City"	7"
115	2010	Grant Hart	"You're the Reflection"	7"
116	2010	Halo of Flies on White Drugs	35 Power	7"
117	2010	Various artists	Dope-Guns-'N-Fucking in the Streets Volume Twelve	7"
118	2010	King Barry & The Sinister Soulsters/Haze XXL With Jon Spencer	Fuzz Buzz Kill Summit	7"
119	2010	Hepa-Titus, Halo of Flies	"I Am the Jaw"/"Die You Fuk"	7"
120	2011	The Book of Right On/The Drub	Grumpy's March Residency	7"
121	2011	Jon Spencer Blues Explosion/Melvins	"Black Betty"	7"
122	2011	The Blind Shake	Grumpys May Residency	7"
123	2012	Melvins/U-Men	Sugar Daddy Live Split Series	12"
124	2012	Melvins/Cows	Sugar Daddy Live Split Series	12"
125	2012	Unsane/Melvins	Amphetamine Reptile Records Cage Match	7"
126	2012	Melvins/Killdozer	Sugar Daddy Live Split Series	12"
127	2012	Melvins/Off!	Sugar Daddy Live Split Series	12"
128	2012	Melvins/Hammerhead	Amphetamine Reptile Records Cage Match	7"
129	2012	Melvins/Seawhores	Melvins/Seawhores	12"
129	2012	Melvins/Butthole Surfers	Sugar Daddy Live Split Series	12"
130	2012	Melvins/Negative Approach/Die Kreuzen/Necros	Sugar Daddy Live Split Series	12"
132	2013	Melvins/Mudhoney	Sugar Daddy Live Split Series	12"
133	2013	Melvins/Fucked Up	Sugar Daddy Live Split Series	12"
134	2013	Melvins/Napalm Death	Sugar Daddy Live Split Series	12"
135	2013	Melvins	A Tribute To The Scientists	7"
136	2014	Melvins	A Tribute to David Bowie	7"
137	2015	Melvins	A Tribute to The Jam	7"
138	2013	Melvins	A Tribute to The Kinks	7"
138	2013	Melvins	Xmas Singles Bundle	7"
139	2014	Melvins	"A Tribute to Pop-O-Pies"/"Tales of Terror"	7"
140	2013	Melvins	A Tribute to Queen	7"
141	2015	Melvins	A Tribute to Roxy Music	7"
142	2013	Melvins	A Tribute to Throbbing Gristle	7"
143	2013	Melvins	A Tribute to Venom	7"
144	2013	Melvins	Gaylord	7"
145	2013	Hepa-Titus	Don't Half a Cow	7"
146	2013	Die Nerven	Nichts Neues	7"
147	2013	Melvins/Helmet	2013 Invasion	7"
148	2013	Melvins	I Told You I Was Crazy	7"
149	2013	Melvins/Fantomas	Sugar Daddy Live Split Series	7"
150	2014	Melvins/King Buzzo	Sugar Daddy Live Split Series	7"
151	2014	Melvins/Melvins 1983	Sugar Daddy Live Split Series	7"
152	2014	Hepa-Titus/Melvins	How Chow Now Dead Cow?	7"
152	2014	Dale Crover	"United Fruit"/"Dead or Alive"	7"
154	2014	Various artists	Dope-Guns-'N-Fucking in the Streets Volume Thirteen	7"
155	2015	Melvins/Karp	A Tribute to The Kinks	7"
157	2015	Helmet	Stuck	7"
158	2015	Hepa-Titus	Touched by God	7", CD
159	2016	The Hand	You Weren't There Vol. 1 - Live at Grumpy's	7"
160	2016	Crystal Fairy	"Necklace of Divorce"/"Drugs on the Bus"	7"
161	2016	Melvins	"Euthanasia"/"Ambition"	7"
162	2016	Cherubs/Gay Witch Abortion With Haze XXL	Ink Obscene Archaic Gutter Memes	7"
163	2017	Unsane	"Fix It"/"Wrung"	7"
