= Nuggets & Doozies =

Video by Cows
- Released: October 17, 1995
- Recorded: CBGB's, New York City; Khyber Pass, Philadelphia, PA
- Genre: Noise rock, post-hardcore
- Label: Amphetamine Reptile

Cows chronology
Orphan's Tragedy (1994)	Nuggets & Doozies (1995)	Old Gold 1989–1991 (1996)

Professional ratings
Review scores
Source	Rating
Allmusic	3/5 stars

Nuggets & Doozies is a concert video by the Minneapolis-based noise rock band Cows, released on October 17, 1995 by Amphetamine Reptile Records.

== Track listing ==
No.	Title	Length
1.	"Mine" (music video)
2.	"Allergic to Myself"
3.	"4 Things"
4.	"Plowed"
5.	"Hitting the Wall"
6.	"Pickled Garbage Soup"
7.	"Sugar Torch" (music video)
8.	"Heave Ho"
9.	"Witch Hunt"
10.	"Mine"
11.	"Organized Meat"
12.	"Hitting the Wall" (music video)
13.	"Cow Island"
14.	"Shitbeard"
15.	"Baby Love"
16.	"Sexy Pee Story"
17.	"Chow"
18.	"Allergic to Myself" (music video)
19.	"The Bucket"
20.	"39 Lashes"

== Release history ==
Region	Date	Label	Format	Catalog
United States	1995	Amphetamine Reptile	VHS	AVMS 007
