= Plowed (EP) =

EP by Cows
- Released: 1992
- Genre: Noise rock, post-hardcore
- Length: 13:42
- Label: Amphetamine Reptile
- Producer: Cows, David B. Livingstone

Cows chronology
Cunning Stunts (1992)	Plowed (1992)	Sexy Pee Story (1993)

Professional ratings
Review scores
Source	Rating
AllMusic	3/5 stars

Plowed is an EP by the Minneapolis-based noise rock band Cows, released in 1992 by Amphetamine Reptile Records.

== Track listing ==
All tracks are written by Cows.

No.	Title	Length
1.	"Plowed"	2:50
2.	"In the Mouth"	4:50
3.	"Joan Baez"	3:13
4.	"I Love You"	2:49

== Personnel ==
Adapted from the Plowed liner notes.

Cows

- Thor Eisentrager – guitar
- Norm Rogers – drums
- Kevin Rutmanis – bass guitar
- Shannon Selberg – vocals, bugle

Production and additional personnel

- Adolphe Builha – engineering
- Cows – production
- David B. Livingstone – production

== Release history ==
Region	Date	Label	Format	Catalog
United States	1992	Amphetamine Reptile	LP	SCALE 50
Germany	1992	Amphetamine Reptile	CD	ARRCD 34/224
