= Daddy Has a Tail! =

Studio album by Cows
- Released: July 10, 1989
- Studio: Death Jam, Detroit, MI
- Genre: Noise rock
- Length: 37:05
- Label: Amphetamine Reptile
- Producer: Cows, David B. Livingstone

Cows chronology
Taint Pluribus Taint Unum (1987)	Daddy Has a Tail! (1989)	Effete and Impudent Snobs (1990)

Professional ratings
Review scores
Source	Rating
AllMusic	2.5/5 stars

Daddy Has a Tail! is the second studio album by Minneapolis-based noise rock band Cows. It was released on July 10, 1989, via Amphetamine Reptile Records, their first album for the label.

== Recording ==
The album was recorded and mixed by David B. Livingstone, who at the time was the guitarist for God Bullies, and producer Tim Mac. Originally, the record had been mixed to videotape but the result was of poor quality, forcing Mac and Livingstone to remix the entire album from scratch within the relatively short time span of 4 hours. Regarding the album's current mix, Livingstone has said, "I always felt that they got really screwed. I felt really bad." and that he intends to eventually remix the entire album from the original masters.

== Release ==
The album was never released on its own on CD. It can be found on the Old Gold 1989–1991 compilation released in 1996, with the exception of the song "Chow". Amphetamine Reptile Europe released the album in its entirety on a two-for-one CD that included "Peacetika", although "I Miss Her Beer" and "Sugar" are combined into one track.

The song "Chow" appears on a split with the Melvins for Sugar Daddy Live.

== Track listing ==
All tracks are written by Cows, except "Shaking" by Johnny Kidd.

Side one
No.	Title	Length
1.	"Shaking"	2:47
2.	"Camouflage Monkey"	2:14
3.	"Part My Konk"	6:09
4.	"Bum in the Alley"	3:18
5.	"Chow"	3:43

Side two
No.	Title	Length
1.	"By the Throat"	2:08
2.	"I Miss Her Beer"	2:09
3.	"Sugar"	2:47
4.	"Chasin' Darla"	4:28
5.	"Sticky and Sweet"	4:29

== Personnel ==
Adapted from the Daddy Has a Tail! liner notes.

Cows

- Thor Eisentrager – guitar
- Tony Oliveri – drums
- Kevin Rutmanis – bass guitar
- Shannon Selberg – vocals

Production and additional personnel

- Cows – production
- David B. Livingstone – production, recording, mixing
- Tim Mac – mixing

== Release history ==
Region	Date	Label	Format	Catalog
United States	1989	Amphetamine Reptile	CS, LP	ARR 89163
