= Whorn =

Studio album by Cows
- Released: March 26, 1996
- Recorded: January 1996
- Studios: Perma Sonic (Minneapolis, MN)
- Genres: Noise rock, post-hardcore
- Length: 50:11
- Label: Amphetamine Reptile
- Producer: Tim Mac

Cows chronology
Old Gold 1989–1991 (1996)	Whorn (1996)	Sorry in Pig Minor (1998)

Whorn is the eighth album by the Minneapolis-based noise rock band Cows. It was released on March 26, 1996, by Amphetamine Reptile Records.

== Production ==
Whorn was the band's first time working with Tim Mac since their fourth album Peacetika. During the recording, Tim Mac opted for a "live sound," having the band play together as a whole instead of recording their parts individually.

== Critical reception ==
Professional ratings
Review scores
Source	Rating
AllMusic	2.5/5 stars
Pitchfork Media	7.5/10
RIP	3/5 stars

The Washington Post wrote: "This Minneapolis quartet blares and bleats, its shrillness occasionally augmented by the trombone squalls of singer Shannon Selberg, whose playing is almost as atonal as his singing. The band's new Whorn is perhaps not its most abrasive work, but it's hardly mellow."

== Track listing ==
All tracks are written by Cows.

No.	Title	Length
1.	"Divorcee' Moore"	5:16
2.	"A Oven"	3:41
3.	"The Warden"	4:33
4.	"Mas-No Mas"	2:33
5.	"Four Things"	3:49
6.	"Tropic of Cancelled"	3:38
7.	"The New Girl"	5:29
8.	"Organized Meat"	4:32
9.	"Massa Peel"	3:23
10.	"A Gift Called Life"	2:09
11.	"Jikan"	11:32

Jikan begins with a distorted sample of a Japanese woman speaking, that begins at 0:00 ends at 0:06. The sample is followed by almost 10 minutes of silence (0:06 - 10:06). After the silence, there is a brief hidden track of the band performing a faster, funkier version of "The New Girl."

== Personnel ==
Adapted from the Whorn liner notes.

Cows

- Thor Eisentrager – guitar
- Kevin Rutmanis – bass guitar
- Shannon Selberg – vocals, bugle
- Freddy Votel – drums

Production and additional personnel

- Randy Hawkins – recording, mixing
- Tom Hazelmyer – cover art
- Tim Mac – production, recording, mixing

== Release history ==
Region	Date	Label	Format	Catalog
United States	1996	Amphetamine Reptile	CD, LP	AMREP 050
Germany	1996	Amphetamine Reptile	CD, LP	ARRCD 70/013
Poland	1996	Amphetamine Reptile	CS	ARR MC 017
