= Orphan's Tragedy =

Studio album by Cows
- Released: September 13, 1994
- Studio: Black Box, Noyant-la-Gravoyère, France
- Genre: Noise rock
- Length: 48:53
- Label: Amphetamine Reptile
- Producer: Iain Burgess, Cows, Peter Deimel

Cows chronology
Sexy Pee Story (1993)	Orphan's Tragedy (1994)	Nuggets & Doozies (1995)

Professional ratings
Review scores
Source	Rating
AllMusic	3/5 stars
Kerrang!	4/5 stars

Orphan's Tragedy is the seventh studio album by the Minneapolis-based noise rock band Cows. It was released on September 9, 1994, by Amphetamine Reptile Records.

== Track listing ==
All tracks are written by Cows.

No.	Title	Length
1.	"Cow Island"	3:08
2.	"Pussy Is a Monarchy"	3:59
3.	"Orphan's Tragedy"	3:16
4.	"Allergic to Myself"	3:08
5.	"Unrefixed"	1:16
6.	"The Bucket"	2:30
7.	"Pickled Garbage Soup"	4:54
8.	"I'm Both"	3:09
9.	"Witch Hunt"	3:29
10.	"Taxi"	2:47
11.	"Baby Love"	2:26
12.	"My Bob"	4:04
13.	"Shot Down"	4:18
14.	"Smell Shelf"	6:23

== Personnel ==
Adapted from the Orphan's Tragedy liner notes.

Cows

- Thor Eisentrager – guitar
- Norm Rogers – drums
- Kevin Rutmanis – bass guitar
- Shannon Selberg – vocals, bugle

Production and additional personnel

- Iain Burgess – production, engineering
- Peter Deimel – production, engineering
- Tom Hazelmyer – design
- John Largaespada – cover art
- Günter Pauler – mastering

== Release history ==
Region	Date	Label	Format	Catalog
United States	1993	Amphetamine Reptile	CD, CS, LP	AMREP 028
Germany	1993	Amphetamine Reptile	CD, LP	ARR 55/335
