= By the Throat =

By the Throat may refer to:

- By the Throat (Eyedea and Abilities album)
- By the Throat (Ben Frost album)
- "By the Throat", song by Cows from Daddy Has a Tail and Old Gold 1989–1991
- "By the Throat", song by Chvrches from The Bones of What You Believe
- "By the Throat", song by Pretty Girls Make Graves from Good Health (album)
