= Duh, the Big City =

Studio album by Hammerhead
- Released: February 27, 1996
- Recorded: 1995
- Studios: Beehive and Perma Sonics
- Genre: Noise rock
- Length: 38:50
- Label: Amphetamine Reptile

Hammerhead chronology
Into the Vortex (1994)	Duh, the Big City (1996)

Duh, the Big City is the third album by Hammerhead. It was released in 1996 through Amphetamine Reptile Records.

== Critical reception ==
Professional ratings
Review scores
Source	Rating
AllMusic	4/5 stars
Alternative Press	4/5 stars
The Encyclopedia of Popular Music	3/5 stars

The Encyclopedia of Popular Music wrote that the album "successfully distilled all of the band's most distinctive qualities—resonant feedback and sonic disharmony playing as large a part as ever in the group's musical equation."

== Track listing ==
All music is composed by Paul Erickson, except "Victoria" and "Duh, the Big City" by Paul Sanders.

No.	Title	Lyrics	Length
1.	"Earth (I Won't Miss)"	Paul Erickson	5:12
2.	"Meandrathal"	Paul Sanders	4:40
3.	"NY? ... Alone?"	Erickson	1:06
4.	"Mission: Illogical"	Erickson	2:13
5.	"I Don't Know ...Texas"	Erickson	4:22
6.	"Victoria"	Sanders	4:37
7.	"Monkey Mountain"	Erickson	6:02
8.	"Zenith Factory"	Sanders	2:21
9.	"Mune"	Erickson	2:40
10.	"Mr. Bizmuth"	Erickson	1:56
11.	"Duh, the Big City"	Sanders	3:21

== Personnel ==
Hammerhead

- Paul Erickson – bass guitar, vocals
- Jeff Mooridian Jr. – drums
- Paul Sanders – guitar, vocals

Production and additional personnel

- Tom Hazelmyer – cover art
- Tim Mac – recording
