= Plastic Eye Miracle =

Studio album and Live album by God Bullies
- Released: 1989
- Recorded: 1988
- Venue: live tracks recorded April 20, 1988 at Cabaret Metro, Chicago
- Genre: Noise rock
- Length: 27:01
- Label: Mad Queen Records(original release); Amphetamine Reptile Records (reissue)
- Producer: David B. Livingstone

God Bullies chronology
| Plastic Eye Miracle (1989) | Mama Womb Womb (1989) |

Plastic Eye Miracle is the first studio album by the rock band God Bullies. It was released in 1989 through Mad Queen Records. The album was reissued in 1990 on Amphetamine Reptile Records.

== Track listing ==
All tracks are written by God Bullies.

Side one
| No. | Title | Length |
|---|---|---|
| 1. | "It's Over" | 3:50 |
| 2. | "You Cry Now" | 2:55 |
| 3. | "She's Wild" | 5:05 |

Side two
| No. | Title | Length |
|---|---|---|
| 1. | "Plastic Eye Miracle" | 2:21 |
| 2. | "Freefall/Act of Desire" (live) | 5:30 |
| 3. | "Like It Like That" (live) | 2:30 |
| 4. | "Live Sex (Mamma)" (live) | 3:50 |

== Personnel ==
God Bullies

- Adam Berg – drums
- Mike Corso – bass guitar
- Mike Hard – vocals
- David B. Livingstone – guitar, keyboards, production, engineering

Production and additional personnel

- Tom Hazelmyer – cover art
- Peter Houpt – guitar on "Live Sex (Mamma)"
- Aadam Jacobs – recording
