= Effete and Impudent Snobs =

Studio album by Cows
- Released: March 23, 1990
- Studio: Tim Mac's (Minneapolis, Minnesota)
- Genre: Noise rock, post-hardcore
- Length: 34:23
- Label: Amphetamine Reptile
- Producer: Cows, Dave Vandersteen

Cows chronology
Daddy Has a Tail! (1989)	Effete and Impudent Snobs (1990)	Peacetika (1991)

Professional ratings
Review scores
Source	Rating
AllMusic	2/5 stars

Effete and Impudent Snobs is the third album by the Minneapolis-based noise rock band Cows. It was released on March 23, 1990, by Amphetamine Reptile Records.

== Track listing ==
All tracks are written by Cows.

No.	Title	Length
1.	"Memorial"	4:23
2.	"Dirty Leg"	2:39
3.	"Big Mickey"	3:15
4.	"Preyed On"	3:35
5.	"The Emigrant Song"	2:37
6.	"Whitey in the Woodpile"	2:17
7.	"Nancy Boy Cocaine Whore Blues"	4:09
8.	"Cartoon Corral"	1:42
9.	"Little Bit"	4:09
10.	"Put Me Down"	2:05
11.	"Sittin' Around"	3:26

== Personnel ==
Adapted from the Effete and Impudent Snobs liner notes.

Cows

- Thor Eisentrager – guitar
- Tony Oliveri – drums
- Kevin Rutmanis – bass guitar
- Shannon Selberg – vocals, bugle

Production and additional personnel

- Cows – production
- Tim Mac – engineering
- Günter Pauler – mastering
- Dave Vandersteen – production, engineering

== Release history ==
Region	Date	Label	Format	Catalog
United States	1989	Amphetamine Reptile	CD, CS, LP	ARR 89187
