= Taint Pluribus Taint Unum =

Studio album by Cows
- Released: 1987
- Recorded: June – July 1987 in Minneapolis
- Genres: Noise rock, post-hardcore, punk blues
- Length: 35:00
- Label: Treehouse
- Producer: Brian Paulson

Cows chronology
Taint Pluribus Taint Unum (1987)	Daddy Has a Tail! (1989)

Taint Pluribus Taint Unum is the debut studio album by the Minneapolis-based noise rock band Cows, released in 1987 through Treehouse Records.

== Music ==
The first track of the album, "Koyaanisqatsi," is a cover of the intro piece from the 1982 film of the same name.

== Release and reception ==
Professional ratings
Review scores
Source	Rating
AllMusic	4.5/5 stars

The record was released for a limited time on vinyl and has since gone out of print. Unlike its successors, no songs from Taint Pluribus Taint Unum appeared on the Old Gold 1989–1991 compilation.

AllMusic staff writer John Dougan called it "the Cows at their most impenetrable and noisy" and that "fans of Japanese noise acts like the Boredoms and some of John Zorn's more extreme jazzcore outfits might think this is pretty cool." Alternative Rock wrote: "Tragically badly recorded though it is, the screaming, grinding, honking mess which occasionally pulls itself into something like music sounds great at 3 in the morning."

== Track listing ==
All tracks are written by Cows, except "Koyaanisqatsi" by Philip Glass.

Side one
No.	Title	Length
1.	"Koyaanisqatsi"	2:14
2.	"Cow Jazz/Car Chase"	3:40
3.	"Sieve"	2:15
4.	"On Plasma Pond"	2:17
5.	"Yellowbelly"	3:45
6.	"Redhouse"	2:35

Side two
No.	Title	Length
1.	"Carnival Ride"	2:36
2.	"The Pictorial"	2:24
3.	"Tourist"	3:06
4.	"Summertime Bone"	2:16
5.	"Mother (I Love That Bitch)"	1:43
6.	"Weird Kitchen"	6:00

== Personnel ==
Adapted from the Taint Pluribus Taint Unum liner notes.

Cows

- Thor Eisentrager – guitar
- Sandris Rutmanis – drums
- Kevin Rutmanis – bass guitar
- Shannon Selberg – vocals, bugle

Production and additional personnel

- Steve Björklund – assistant engineering, assistant production
- Cows – assistant production
- John Largaespada – cover art
- Brian Paulson – production, engineering

== Release history ==
Region	Date	Label	Format	Catalog
United States	1987	Treehouse	LP	TR 007
