= The Trilogy Vinyl =

Compilation album by Melvins
- Released: February 7, 2000
- Studio: Various
- Genres: Sludge metal; alternative metal; alternative rock
- Label: Ipecac
- Producer: Melvins

Melvins chronology
The Crybaby (2000)	The Trilogy Vinyl (2000)	Electroretard (2001)

The Trilogy Vinyl is a compilation of three albums by American rock band Melvins, The Maggot, The Bootlicker, and The Crybaby, which were released one after another in a series, within a timespan of one year, with similar album covers. It was released exactly the same day that The Crybaby was released. The compilation lists that every song from all three albums is present, though it is not.

== Actual track listing ==
=== Vinyl 1 - The Maggot ===
Side A

1. "Amazon"
2. "AMAZON"
3. "We All love JUDY"
4. "Manky"

Side B

1. "The Green Manalishi (with the two pronged crown)"
2. "The Horn Bearer"
3. "Judy"
4. "See how pretty, see how smart" (the silence that was originally included is not present, and neither is the distorted version of "Toy")

=== Vinyl 2 - The Bootlicker ===
Side A

1. "Toy"
2. "Let it all Be"
3. "Black Santa"
4. "We We"
5. "Up the Dumper"

Side B

1. "Mary Lady Bobby Kins"
2. "Jew boy Flower head"
3. "Lone rose Holding now"
4. "Prig" (the silence following is not present and neither is the cover of "smells like teen spirit")

=== Vinyl 3 - The Crybaby ===
Side A

1. "Smells like teen Spirit"
2. "Blockbuster"
3. "Ramblin' man"
4. "Mine is no disgrace"

Side B

1. "Spineless"
2. "G.I. Joe"
3. "Divorced"

== Artwork included ==
On the back sleeve of the vinyl a warning is included that reads, "Contents include imagery that may be considered offensive or dangerous. Don't be a dumb ass." The artwork is potentially offensive, but is quoted to be a joke by the band (Side B contradicts the artwork of Side A for each vinyl). Side A of the first vinyl is a swastika, and side B is the star of David. Side A of the second vinyl is a picture of the symbol for the Black Panther Party, and side B is the KKK symbol. Side A for the third vinyl is a picture of the Cross, and side B is a Satanic Star.
