= Nationwide (album) =

Studio album by Surgery
- Released: 1990
- Recorded: Fun City, Manhattan, New York
- Genre: Noise rock
- Length: 30:39
- Label: Amphetamine Reptile
- Producer: Surgery, Wharton Tiers

Surgery chronology
Souleater (1989)	Nationwide (1990)	Trim, 9th Ward High Roller (1993)

Professional ratings
Review scores
Source	Rating
Allmusic	3/5 stars

Nationwide is the debut album of Surgery, released in 1990 through Amphetamine Reptile Records.

== Track listing ==
All tracks are written by Surgery.

Side one
No.	Title	Length
1.	"Mistake"	2:15
2.	"Maliblues"	3:43
3.	"Breeding"	3:17
4.	"Bronto"	3:01
5.	"Highway 109"	3:42

Side two
No.	Title	Length
1.	"Do It to It Dynamo"	2:00
2.	"L7"	4:00
3.	"Drive-In Fever"	4:26
4.	"Caveman"	4:15

== Personnel ==
Surgery

- Scott Kleber – guitar
- John Lachapelle – bass guitar
- John Leamy – drums
- Sean McDonnell – vocals

Production and additional personnel

- Dave Deuteronomy – design
- Tom Hazelmyer – design
- Michael Lavine – photography
- Surgery – production
- Wharton Tiers – production, drums on "Highway 109"
