= Old Gold 1989–1991 =

Old Gold (1989–1991)

Compilation album by Cows
- Released: 1996
- Recorded: 1989–1991
- Genre: Noise rock, punk blues
- Length: 75:48
- Label: Amphetamine Reptile

Cows chronology
Nuggets & Doozies (1995)	Old Gold (1989–1991) (1996)	Whorn (1996)

Professional ratings
Review scores
Source	Rating
AllMusic	3/5 stars

Old Gold (1989–1991) is a compilation album by American noise rock band Cows. It is composed of material from three of their earlier albums Daddy Has a Tail, Effete and Impudent Snobs, and Peacetika.

== Track listing ==
1. "Shaking" - 2:47
2. "Camouflage Monkey" - 2:14
3. "Part My Konk" - 6:09
4. "Bum In The Alley" - 3:20
5. "By The Throat" - 2:08
6. "I Miss Her Beer" - 2:09
7. "Sugar" - 2:47
8. "Chasin' Darla" - 4:28
9. "Sticky & Sweet" - 4:33
10. "Memorial" - 4:23
11. "Dirty Leg" - 2:39
12. "Big Mickey" - 3:15
13. "Preyed On" - 3:34
14. "Whitey In The Woodpile" - 2:18
15. "Cartoon Corral" - 1:41
16. "Little Bit" - 4:11
17. "Hitting The Wall" - 2:41
18. "I'm Missing" - 3:56
19. "Can't Die" - 3:07
20. "3-Way Lisa" - 2:59
21. "Good Cop" - 2:38
22. "Peacetika" - 4:14
23. "One O'Clock High" - 3:37

== Personnel ==
Cows

- Thor Eisentrager – guitar
- Kevin Rutmanis – bass guitar
- Shannon Selberg – vocals
- Norm Rogers – drums
- Tony Oliveri – [drums

== Release history ==
Region	Date	Label	Format	Catalog
United States	1996	Amphetamine Reptile	CD	AMREP 047
Germany	1996	Amphetamine Reptile	CD	ARR 68/011
