= Gaunt (band) =

American punk band

- Origin: Columbus, Ohio, United States
- Genres: Punk
- Years active: 1991–1998
- Labels: Thrill Jockey, Crypt, Amphetamine Reptile, Warner Bros.
- Past members: Jerry Wick; Eric Barth; Jeff Regensburger; Jim Weber; Jovan Karcic; Bret Lewis; Brett Falcon; Nick Youngblood; Sam Brown

Gaunt was a Punk band formed in Columbus, Ohio, in 1991. The band released five albums before splitting in 1998.

== History ==
The original lineup formed from remnants of short-lived "punkadelic" band Black Juju, and consisted of guitarist/vocalist/songwriter Jerry Wick, bassist Eric Barth (who had also been in Two Hour Trip with the Spurgeon brothers, who would soon form Greenhorn), and drummer Jeff Regensburger (later of The Patsys). Jim Weber (also of the then newly formed New Bomb Turks) soon joined on second guitar only to leave just as quickly, and following his departure guitarist/songwriter Jovan Karcic (Waybald) joined. Barth and Regensburger would also later leave (in 1995) and be replaced by a series of successors including Bret Lewis and Brett Falcon (Space Cookie, Servotron) on bass, and Nick Youngblood (Beano, The Rackets) and Sam Brown (Feversmile, V-3, New Bomb Turks, The Sun, You're So Bossy) on drums.

In 1994, the quartet was signed to the independent Thrill Jockey and Crypt Records labels and their debut album, Sob Story, was produced by Steve Albini. A follow-up album was released in 1995, titled I Can See Your Mom From Here. The band had gained a loyal local following in the Columbus area, alongside other indie punk rock bands, such as the New Bomb Turks, Thomas Jefferson Slave Apartments, Monster Truck Five, and Pica Huss.

In 1995, Gaunt released a third album, Yeah, Me Too. The album was released by Amphetamine Reptile Records (the label had originally approached them to record a track for their Dope, Guns, and Fucking in the Streets singles series, which they did earlier in the year), produced by Tim Mac (Halo of Flies) - who would remain with the band for the rest of their career as live sound and pre-production engineer - and was recorded over the course of a few days.

One last album was recorded for Thrill Jockey, entitled Kryptonite, and released in 1996. Kryptonite was released with a metallic lime green cover and contained lyrics about Superman, Lois Lane, and lost love. Over the course of the next year, the band began to drift apart, with Wick recording solo material under the name Cocaine Sniffing Triumph. On August 20, 1997, the band signed to major label Warner Bros. Records, and they soon came together again. Despite recording an album's worth of material in a Chicago studio, the band scrapped that material before recording 1998's Bricks and Blackouts. The album was considered to be a departure from their previous work, and although well received by critics, received little promotion and the band split shortly after its release.

In January 2001, Jerry Wick was struck and killed by a car while bicycling home. In 2005, Karcic and Brown opened a coffee shop called Yeah, Me Too, and Brown renewed his relationship with Warner Bros. Records as drummer and songwriter in The Sun.

== Discography ==
=== Albums ===
- Sob Story (1994), Thrill Jockey/Crypt
- I Can See Your Mom From Here (1995), Thrill Jockey/Crypt
- Yeah Me Too (1995), Amphetamine Reptile
- Kryptonite (1996), Thrill Jockey
- Bricks and Blackouts (1998), Warner Bros.

=== EPs ===
- Whitey the Man (1992), Thrill Jockey

=== Singles ===
- "Fielder's Choice" (1992), Datapanik
- "Jim Motherfucker" (1992), Anyway
- "Solution" (1993), Snap! Crackle Punk!
- "Good Bad Happy Sad" (1993), Bag of Hammers
- "Pop Song" (1993), Thrill Jockey
- National Postal Museum (1994), Potential Ashtray - tracks: "Turn to Ash", "Flying"
- 2c USA (1996), Super 8 - tracks: "Cheater's Heaven", "The Powder Keg Variety"
- "97th Tear" (1998), Warner Bros.

=== Split releases ===
- A Datapanik Split Single (1991), Datapanik - split with New Bomb Turks
- "Ohio" (1993), Demolition Derby - split with the Beavers
