= Soul Eater (disambiguation) =

Soul Eater is a Japanese manga series by Atsushi Okubo that was adapted into an anime television series.

Soul Eater may also refer to:

== Fictional characters and objects ==
- Soul Eater Evans, the titular character of the manga and anime series Soul Eater
- Soul Eater, a sword of Riku, a character in the role-playing video game series Kingdom Hearts

== Literature and Film ==
- Soul Eater (novel), a 2006 novel by Michelle Paver
- Soul Eater, a 1983 novel by K. W. Jeter
- The Soul Eater, a 1981 novel by Mike Resnick
- The Soul Eater (film), a 2024 French film

== Music ==
- Souleater, a 1989 EP by Surgery
- "Soul Eater", a song by The Clouds from the 1991 album Penny Century

== Other uses ==
- Soul eater (folklore), an African, American, European, and Oceanian legendary creature
- Soul Eater Not!, a Japanese manga series

== See also ==
- "The Eater of Souls", a 1937 short story by Henry Kuttner
- The Eater of Souls, a character in the novel series The Laundry Files
- The Eater of Souls, a character in the video game Terraria
