= Ethereal Killer =

Studio album by Hammerhead
- Released: 1993
- Recorded: October 3, 1992–October 4, 1992
- Studios: Gark, Minneapolis
- Genre: Noise rock
- Length: 32:42
- Label: Amphetamine Reptile

Hammerhead chronology
Ethereal Killer (1993)	Evil Twin (1993)

Ethereal Killer is the debut album of Hammerhead, released in 1993 through Amphetamine Reptile Records.

== Critical reception ==
Professional ratings
Review scores
Source	Rating
AllMusic	3/5 stars

City Pages called the album an "unrelenting, rage-fueled debut." The Washington Post wrote: "Thump and squeal is essential to the trio's Ethereal Killer, but close listening reveals actual musicality; buried in the mix, guitarist Paul Sanders and bassist Paul Erickson occasionally trade vocals and even harmonize."

== Track listing ==
All tracks are written by Hammerhead.

No.	Title	Length
1.	"American Rampage"	3:41
2.	"Louse"	2:02
3.	"Anemia"	3:00
4.	"Vegas Incident"	4:34
5.	"Slumberyard"	3:17
6.	"Tuffskins"	3:31
7.	"Blow-By"	2:09
8.	"Fly"	2:45
9.	"Moleboy"	3:32
10.	"Ethereal Killer"	4:11

== Personnel ==
Hammerhead

- Paul Erickson – bass guitar, vocals
- Jeff Mooridian Jr. – drums
- Paul Sanders – guitar, vocals

Production and additional personnel

- Chris Coyne – recording
- Hammerhead – mixing
- Kalal – cover art
- Don Lewis – photography
- David B. Livingstone – mixing, recording
- Bob Pague – mixing and recording on "Tuffskins"
- Jeff Sanders – mixing and recording on "Tuffskins"
