= Treehouse Records =

Treehouse Records may refer to:

- Treehouse Records, a record label established by Blaine Larsen's management in 2009
- Treehouse Records, a record store on the site of Oar Folkjokeopus, Minneapolis, Minnesota, U.S., 2001–2017
- Treehouse Records, a record label founded by the Futuristics
