= Mr.phylzzz =

American noise rock band

mr.phylzzz
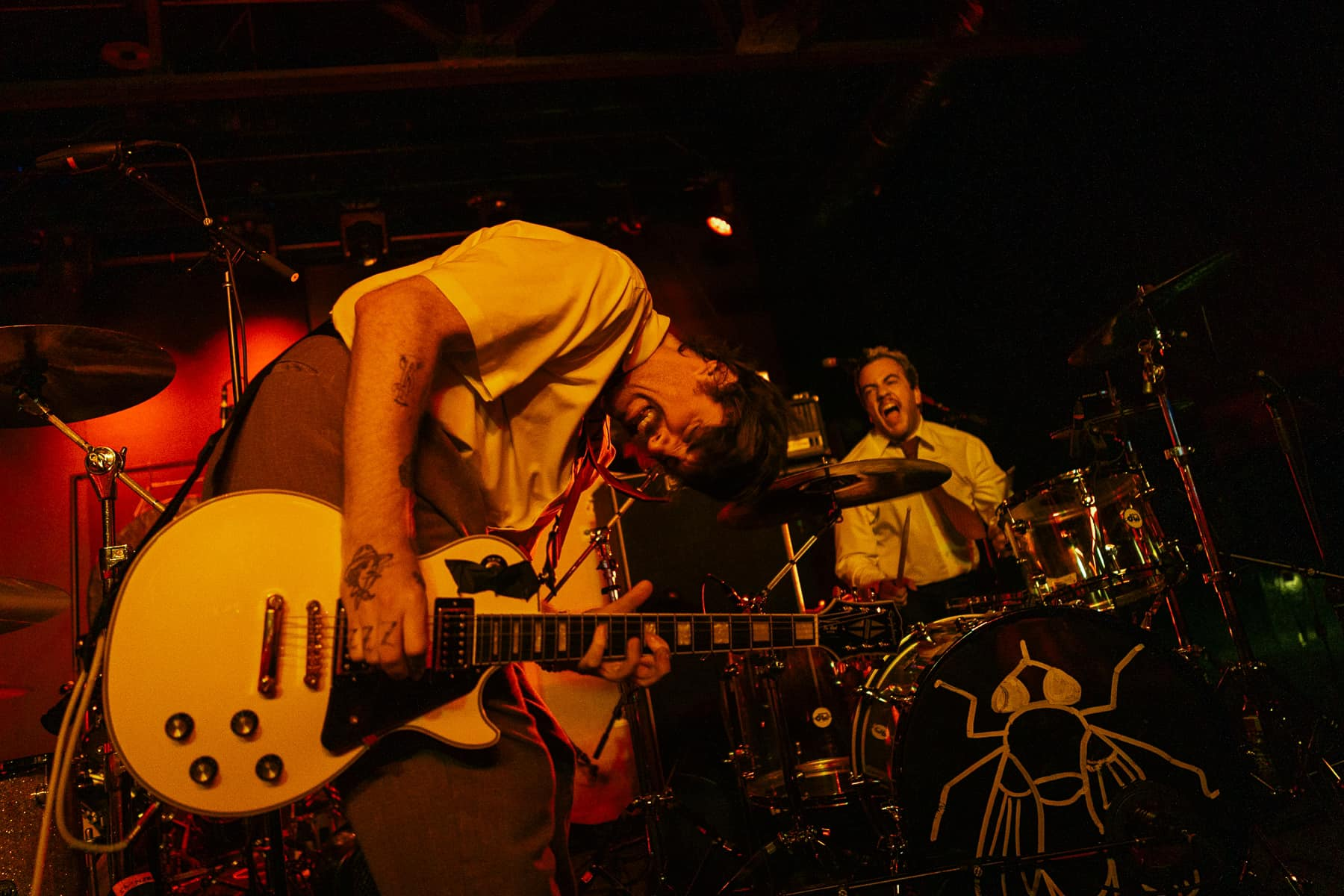

Background information
- Origin: Cincinnati
- Genres: Noise rock
- Years active: 2015-present
- Label: Amphetamine Reptile Records
- Members: Clinton Jacob; Danny Sein
- Past members: Ray Redmon; Dan Patch
- Website: www.mrphylzzz.com

mr.phylzzz is an American noise rock band from Chicago, Illinois that has released three albums under the Amphetamine Reptile Records label.

== History ==
Clinton Jacob and Ray Redmon formed mr.phylzzz in Cincinnati, Ohio in 2015, and in the same year they released their first three singles including FLYZZZ. In 2019, they released their first album Penitent Curtis under the Amphetamine Reptile Records label.

Following the release of Penitent Curtis, mr.phylzzz continued to tour, switching to a new drummer Dan Patch for that period. During the COVID-19 pandemic, Clinton Jacob continued to write and record songs, ultimately moving to Chicago where he recorded their second album Cancel Culture Club which was released in 2022, with drums performed by Danny Sein.

In August 2023 with a lineup of Clinton Jacob and Danny Sein, mr.phylzzz released their third album Fat Chance, and between August and October of that year toured as the opening band for Boris and Melvins on their Twins of Evil Tour.

== Members ==
Current

- Clinton Jacob - guitar, vocals (2015–present)
- Danny Sein - drums (2022–present)

Former

- Ray Redmon - drums (2015–2019)
- Dan Patch - drums (2019)

== Discography ==
=== Albums ===
- Penitent Curtis (Amphetamine Reptile Records, 2019)
- Cancel Culture Club (Amphetamine Reptile Records, 2022)
- Fat Chance (Amphetamine Reptile Records, 2023)

=== Singles and EPs ===
- FLYZZZ (2015)
- No Planzzz (2015)
- Layitonmezzz (2015)
- Sound Like Everybody Else EP (2016)
- Pull (2016)
- I took a selife at a protest so now im a good person (2020)
- The Crusher (2020)
- Karl And His New Big Suit (2020)
- Mr. Entertainer - featuring King Buzzo, Kevin Rutmanis, Haze XXL (2022)
- Over and Over Again (2026)

=== Live albums ===
- Real Live Suicide (2017)
