= Peacetika =

Studio album by Cows
- Released: March 15, 1991
- Studios: Mirror Image (Minneapolis, MN)
- Genres: Noise rock, post-hardcore
- Length: 26:09
- Label: Amphetamine Reptile
- Producers: Cows, Tim Mac

Cows chronology
Effete and Impudent Snobs (1990)	Peacetika (1991)	Cunning Stunts (1992)

Peacetika is the fourth studio album by the Minneapolis-based noise rock band Cows. It was released on March 25, 1991, by Amphetamine Reptile Records. The band supported the album with a North American tour.

== Critical reception ==
Professional ratings
Review scores
Source	Rating
AllMusic	3/5 stars

Trouser Press opined that "the spectacular 'Hitting the Wall' begins the album with pounding and whistling organized mayhem, which the weaker following tracks can't equal."

In 2005, City Pages listed "Hitting the Wall" as one of "Minnesota's Fifty Greatest Hits", writing: "Am-Rep's leading lights corral their mondo-hate-scum-boogie into something like a pop song without diluting Shannon Selberg's stay-away-from-me scream or Thor Eisentrager and Kevin Rutmanis's guitar-bass katzenjammer."

== Track listing ==
All tracks are written by Cows.

Side one
No.	Title	Length
1.	"Hitting the Wall"	2:41
2.	"John Henry"	3:36
3.	"The Man"	2:53
4.	"I'm Missing"	3:56

Side two
No.	Title	Length
1.	"Can't Die"	3:07
2.	"3-Way Lisa"	2:59
3.	"Good Cop"	2:38
4.	"Peacetika"	4:16

== Personnel ==
Adapted from the Peacetika liner notes.

Cows

- Thor Eisentrager – guitar
- Norm Rogers – drums
- Kevin Rutmanis – bass guitar
- Shannon Selberg – vocals, bugle

Production and additional personnel

- Cows – production
- Tim Mac – production, engineering

== Release history ==
Region	Date	Label	Format	Catalog
United States	1991	Amphetamine Reptile	LP	ARR 18/145
