= Freddy Votel =

American musician

- Born: 1965 (age 60–61)
- Genres: Noise rock, post-hardcore, post-punk
- Occupation: Musician
- Instrument: Drums
- Years active: 1983–present
- Labels: Amphetamine Reptile, Treehouse
- Formerly of: Cows; T.V.B.C.

Freddy Votel is an American drummer and best known as a member of the noise rock group Cows and as a founding member of T.V.B.C.

== Biography ==
Freddy Votel grew up in Saint Paul before moving to Minneapolis and becoming involved in the music scene there. He began performing with guitarist and vocalist Paul Metzger in 1983. Together with Pat Dzieweczynski they formed the post-punk band T.V.B.C. in 1985. The trio recorded two albums for Treehouse Records, the first Ex Cathedra in 1987 and the second titled The Blues the following year. The group disbanded in 1993. In 1995 Votel joined the group Cows, who had already recorded and released numerous albums. He recorded Whorn and Sorry in Pig Minor with them before the band dissolved in 1998.

Votel returned to T.V.B.C. when they recorded Man With a Movie Camera in 2003, a live performance of soundtrack to accompany a screening of Dziga Vertov's 1929 silent film of the same name. The band reunited again in 2011 to perform live at The Loring in Minneapolis.

== Musical style ==
Votel favors playing that is emotionally driven as opposed to technically proficient, naming drummers Stewart Copeland, John Bonham, Max Roach, Elvin Jones and Keith Moon as particularly influential to him. Favorite musical artists include: Steroid Maximus, Captain Beefheart, Miles Davis, Sparks, Skeleton Key, AC/DC, Snakefinger, Wire, Ornette Coleman, Can, Kraftwerk, Swans and Sielun Veljet.

== Discography ==
Year	Artist	Album	Label
1987	T.V.B.C.	Ex Cathedra	Treehouse
1988	T.V.B.C.	The Blues	Treehouse
1996	Cows	Whorn	Amphetamine Reptile
1998	Cows	Sorry in Pig Minor	Amphetamine Reptile
2003	T.V.B.C.	Man With a Movie Camera	self-released
2007	Skoal Kodiak	Three People Are Keep Having Grape Emergencys	self-released
2013	Marijuana Deathsquads	Oh My Sexy Lord	Totally Gross National Product
