= Sorry in Pig Minor =

Studio album by Cows
- Released: March 10, 1998
- Studios: AmRep, Minneapolis, MN
- Genres: Noise rock, post-hardcore
- Length: 47:30
- Label: Amphetamine Reptile
- Producer: Buzz Osborne

Cows chronology
Whorn (1996)	Sorry in Pig Minor (1998)

Professional ratings
Review scores
Source	Rating
AllMusic	3/5 stars

Sorry in Pig Minor is the ninth and final studio album by the Minneapolis-based noise rock band Cows, released on March 10, 1998, by Amphetamine Reptile Records. It was produced by Buzz Osborne (aka King Buzzo) of the Melvins.

== Track listing ==
All tracks are written by Cows.

No.	Title	Length
1.	"Cabin Man"	5:14
2.	"Finished Again"	2:57
3.	"No, I'm Not Coming Out"	4:11
4.	"Dear Dad"	2:23
5.	"Eureka! Funday!"	3:02
6.	"Death in the Tall Weeds"	2:45
7.	"El Shiksa"	4:19
8.	"Life After Beth"	3:19
9.	"Saliva of the Fittest"	3:29
10.	"Felon of Troy"	2:34
11.	"Say Uncle"	13:17

Say Uncle ends at 5:44, and is followed by roughly five minutes of silence before a hidden track begins. The track is a rough, dub remix made during the recording sessions. After this track ends, a poorly sung country song begins, with studio banter played over the top.

== Personnel ==
Adapted from the Sorry in Pig Minor liner notes.

Cows

- Thor Eisentrager – electric, acoustic & plastic guitars, backing vocals
- Kevin Rutmanis – bass, guitar, organ, la la choir (2)
- Shannon Selberg – vocals, keyboard, horns
- Freddy Votel – drums, la la choir (2)

Production and additional personnel

- King Buzzo – producer, la la choir (2)
- Amanda Ferguson – la la choir (2)
- Dave Gardner – recording
- Randy Hawkins – recording, mixing, Shiksa whistle (7)
- Paul Metzger – cover art, design

== Release history ==
Region	Date	Label	Format	Catalog
United States	1998	Amphetamine Reptile	CD, LP	AMREP 066
