= Cunning Stunts (Cows album) =

Studio album by Cows
- Released: 1992
- Studios: Mirror Image, Minneapolis, MN
- Genres: Noise rock, post-hardcore, hardcore punk
- Length: 38:56
- Label: Amphetamine Reptile
- Producer: Iain Burgess

Cows chronology
Peacetika (1991)	Cunning Stunts (1992)	Plowed (1992)

Cunning Stunts is the fifth studio album by the Minneapolis-based noise rock band Cows, released in 1992 by Amphetamine Reptile Records. It was their first album where they began developing real melodies and patterns instead of their usual blasts of noise. The switch to producer Iain Burgess brought an increase in sound quality from previous albums. It was long since out print; however, MVD Audio reissued and distributed the album on CD and a limited edition "Blue Opaque" vinyl LP in 2016.

The title is a spoonerism of the term "stunning cunts". The band Caravan used this title for their 1975 album. The album cover design alludes to the Reid Miles designed cover of Eric Dolphy's 1964 album Out to Lunch!

The band supported the album with a North American tour.

== Critical reception ==
Professional ratings
Review scores
Source	Rating
AllMusic	4.5/5 stars

The Chicago Sun-Times wrote that "the music is jarring and [Shannon] Selberg's howling is initially user-unfriendly, yet his disturbed lyrics are undeniable." The Lancaster New Era listed Cunning Stunts as one of 1992's best albums, deeming it "truly, truly demented and truly, truly beautiful." In 1999, City Pages included it on a list of Amphetamine Reptile's greatest albums; it was also given an honorable mention in an article about the best Minneapolis albums of the 1990s.

== Track listing ==
All tracks are written by Cows, except "Midnight Cowboy" by John Barry.

No.	Title	Length
1.	"Heave Ho"	2:08
2.	"Walks Alone"	2:47
3.	"Contamination"	3:11
4.	"Mr. Cancelled"	4:19
5.	"Mine"	3:31
6.	"Midnight Cowboy"	2:50
7.	"Everybody"	3:01
8.	"Two Little Pigs"	3:00
9.	"The Woman Inside"	2:34
10.	"Terrifique"	3:15
11.	"Down Below"	4:06
12.	"Ort"	4:22

== Personnel ==
Adapted from the Cunning Stunts liner notes.

Cows

- Thor Eisentrager – guitar
- Norm Rogers – drums
- Kevin Rutmanis – bass guitar
- Shannon Selberg – vocals, bugle

Production and additional personnel

- Iain Burgess – production, recording
- Günter Pauler – mastering

== Release history ==
Region	Date	Label	Format	Catalog
United States	1992	Amphetamine Reptile	CD, CS, LP	AMREP 007
