= Evil twin (disambiguation) =

An evil twin is an antagonist character in many fictional works.

Evil twin may also refer to:

== Film and TV ==
- Evil Twin (film), a 2007 South Korean horror film
- The Evil Twin, TV movie with Tomas Chovanec, Tanya Clarke
- Evil Twins (RuPaul's Drag Race)

== Games ==
- Evil Twin: Cyprien's Chronicles, a 2001 video game by Ubisoft and In Utero
- Evil Twins, two villains from the video game Crash Twinsanity

== Music ==
- Evil Twin (EP), a 1993 EP by Hammerhead, or its title track
- "Evil Twin", a song by Lindsey Stirling from the album Duality, 2024
- "Evil Twin" (song), a 2019 song by Meghan Trainor
- "Evil Twin", a song by Eminem from the album The Marshall Mathers LP 2, 2013
- "Evil Twin", a song by Anthrax from the album For All Kings, 2016
- "Evil Twin", a song by Arctic Monkeys, a b-side to the single "Suck It and See", 2011
- Evil Twin, a nickname of the Fender Twin amplifier manufactured 1994-2001
- The Evil Twin, a nickname of the guitarist for Black Label Society Nick Catanese (born 1971)
- "My Evil Twin", a song by They Might Be Giants from their album Apollo 18, 1992

== Other uses ==
- Evil twin (wireless networks), a method used to facilitate phishing
- Evil Twin Brewing, a gypsy brewery in Denmark
