= Into the Vortex =

Studio album by Hammerhead
- Released: March 31, 1994
- Recorded: January 1994 at Am Rep Recording Division, Minneapolis, Minnesota
- Genre: Noise rock
- Length: 39:41
- Label: Amphetamine Reptile

Hammerhead chronology
Evil Twin (1993)	Into the Vortex (1994)	Duh, the Big City (1996)

Into the Vortex is the second album by Hammerhead. It was released in 1994 through Amphetamine Reptile Records.

== Critical reception ==
Professional ratings
Review scores
Source	Rating
AllMusic	4/5 stars

Portland Mercury called the album "one of the finest releases in the storied history of Amphetamine Reptile Records." The Seattle Times wrote that "the songs ... explode like pop supernovas – the music is packed so densely that it bursts into massive fireballs of rage." Gimme Indie Rock: 500 Essential American Underground Rock Albums 1981–1996 called Into the Vortex "among the most intense and enjoyable albums to come out of indie rock's less friendly back streets."

== Track listing ==
All tracks are written by Hammerhead.

No.	Title	Length
1.	"Swallow"	4:16
2.	"The Starline Locomotive"	5:30
3.	"Zesta"	2:28
4.	"All This Is Yours"	3:44
5.	"Brest"	4:18
6.	"Double Negative"	3:23
7.	"Empty Angel"	4:43
8.	"Galaxy 66"	4:00
9.	"Journey to the Center of Tetnus 4"	7:11

== Personnel ==
Hammerhead

- Paul Erickson – bass guitar, vocals
- Jeff Mooridian Jr. – drums
- Paul Sanders – guitar, vocals

Production and additional personnel

- Tom Hazelmyer – cover art
- Tim Mac – recording
