= Spare Parts =

Spare Parts may refer to:

- Spare part, an item of inventory used to replace a failed or missing part

== Film and television ==
- Spare Parts (1979 film), or Fleisch, a German television horror film
- Spare Parts (2003 film), a Slovenian drama film
- Spare Parts (2015 film), an American-Mexican biographical drama film
- "Spare Parts" (Yes, Dear), a 2003 TV episode

== Music ==
- Spare Parts (album), by Status Quo, 1969
- Spare Parts (EP), by Servotron, 1997
- "Spare Parts" (song), by Bruce Springsteen, 1988

== Other uses ==
- Spare Parts (audio drama), a 2002 Doctor Who audio drama
- Spare Parts (video game), a 2011 platform game
- Spare Parts Puppet Theatre, Fremantle, Western Australia
