= Dog Show (album) =

Studio album by God Bullies
- Released: 1990
- Recorded: Death Jam Studios, Detroit, Michigan
- Genre: Noise rock
- Length: 34:58
- Label: Amphetamine Reptile

God Bullies chronology
Mama Womb Womb (1989)	Dog Show (1990)	War on Everybody (1991)

Professional ratings
Review scores
Source	Rating
AllMusic	4.5/5 stars

Dog Show is the third studio album by the noise rock band God Bullies. It was released in 1990 by Amphetamine Reptile Records.

== Track listing ==
All tracks are written by God Bullies.

No.	Title	Length
1.	"Let's Go To Hell"	3:17
2.	"Monster Jesus"	2:41
3.	"Cemetary"	1:52
4.	"I Am Invisible"	4:43
5.	"Buddha"	3:45
6.	"The Godfather Goes To Hell Pt. 2"	0:46
7.	"2 + 2"	4:24
8.	"Do It Again"	3:05
9.	"Shallow Grave"	4:02
10.	"Like It Like That"	2:29
11.	"Abigail"	3:48

== Personnel ==
God Bullies

- Adam Berg – drums, percussion
- Mike Corso – bass guitar, organ
- Mike Hard – vocals, sampler
- David B. Livingstone – guitar, synthesizer, sampler, engineering, mixing

Production and additional personnel

- Michael Cergizan – guitar on "I Am Invisible"
- Peter Houpt – slide guitar on "Abigail"
- Laura Maloney – photography
- Mary Kate Murray – backing vocals
- Tabatha Predovich – backing vocals
