= Sexy Pee Story =

Studio album by Cows
- Released: March 23, 1993
- Studios: AmRep, Minneapolis, MN)
- Genre: Noise rock
- Length: 40:42
- Label: Amphetamine Reptile
- Producer: Iain Burgess

Cows chronology
Plowed (1992)	Sexy Pee Story (1993)	Orphan's Tragedy (1994)

Sexy Pee Story is the sixth studio album by Minneapolis-based noise rock band Cows. It was released on March 23, 1993, by Amphetamine Reptile Records.

== Release and reception ==
Professional ratings
Review scores
Source	Rating
AllMusic	4.5/5 stars

A music video was made for "Sugar Torch" and directed by David Roth. It can be found on the Dope, Guns & Fucking up Your Videodeck, Vol. 1-3 DVD released by MVD Visual.

AllMusic staff writer John Dougan called the album a "terrific, noisy, clamorous record stuffed to the gills with pure punk rock excitement."

Spin wrote: "Comfy with its funk now, the rhythm unit bangs down walls, as intelligent guitar noise blankets the mess, segueing smoothly between melody and tuneless abrasion."

== Track listing ==
All tracks are written by Cows, except "39 Lashes" by Tim Rice and Andrew Lloyd Webber.

No.	Title	Length
1.	"Blown"	2:24
2.	"Shitbeard"	5:27
3.	"Doing the Obvious"	3:21
4.	"Ch"	3:16
5.	"39 Lashes"	5:30
6.	"Uptown Suckers"	2:41
7.	"Sexy Pee Story"	4:18
8.	"The Ouch Cube"	3:24
9.	"Mrs. Cancelled"	3:05
10.	"You Owe Me"	3:24
11.	"Sugar Torch"	3:50

== Personnel ==
Adapted from the Sexy Pee Story liner notes.

Cows

- Thor Eisentrager – guitar
- Norm Rogers – drums
- Kevin Rutmanis – bass guitar
- Shannon Selberg – vocals, bugle

Production and additional personnel

- Iain Burgess – production, engineering
- Cows – production
- Tom Hazelmyer – design

== Release history ==
Region	Date	Label	Format	Catalog
United States	1993	Amphetamine Reptile	CD	AMREP 015
Germany	1993	Amphetamine Reptile	CD, LP	ARRCD 40/261
Poland	1993	Amphetamine Reptile	CS	ARR MC 002
