= Plowed =

Plowed may refer to:

- Plowed (EP), a 1992 EP by Cows
- "Plowed" (song), a 1994 song by Sponge
