= Trim, 9th Ward High Roller =

EP by Surgery
- Released: June 30, 1993
- Recorded: B.C. Studios, Brooklyn, New York
- Genre: Noise rock
- Length: 25:40
- Label: Amphetamine Reptile
- Producer: Martin Bisi, Surgery

Surgery chronology
Nationwide (1990)	Trim, 9th Ward High Roller (1993)	Shimmer (1994)

Professional ratings
Review scores
Source	Rating
Allmusic	3/5 stars

Trim, 9th Ward High Roller is an EP by Surgery, released on June 30, 1993 through Amphetamine Reptile Records. Featuring improved songwriting and tighter musicianship, the band expanded upon their mix of blues and southern rock with noise rock while developing a more straightforward sound.

== Release and reception ==
The album is regarded as a standout for Surgery in terms of musicianship and unique compared to Amphetamine Reptile's catalog. Victor W. Valdivia of allmusic gave the album three out of five stars, noting that "with their bad-boy swagger, Surgery is really an early-'70s blues-rock band stuck out of their time, far more sleazy (à la the Rolling Stones and New York Dolls) than scuzzy (as all other Amphetamine Reptile artists, who seem more rooted in Richard Hell and Sonic Youth)." He went on to say "Sean McDonald's voice is the key weapon here, a raspy, gritty instrument devoid of any punk affectations. Coupled with the skillful guitar of John Leamy, it gives the EP a feel unlike any other Amphetamine Reptile release".

== Track listing ==
All tracks are written by Surgery.

No.	Title	Length
1.	"Kickin' Around"	3:43
2.	"Maldia"	3:35
3.	"Brother Remington"	5:28
4.	"A.K."	3:37
5.	"Exquisite"	4:47
6.	"Your Beautiful Smile"	4:26

== Personnel ==
Surgery

- Scott Kleber – guitar
- John Lachapelle – bass guitar
- John Leamy – drums
- Sean McDonnell – vocals

Production and additional personnel

- Martin Bisi – production, engineering
- Daniel Corrigan – photography
- Tom Hazelmyer – design
- Surgery – production
