= You Owe Me =

You Owe Me may refer to:

- "You Owe Me" (Nas song), 2000
- "You Owe Me" (Chainsmokers song), 2018
- "U.O.Me (You Owe Me)", single by Luv' 1978
- "You Owe Me", song by Cows from Sexy Pee Story 1993
- "You Owe Me", song by Michelle Wright written Craig Wiseman from For Me It's You 1996
- "You Owe Me", song by Scarface from My Homies 1998 and The Best of Scarface 2002
- "You Owe Me", song by Danny from Charm (album) 2006 and Behind the Beats, Vol. 2 2007
- "You Owe Me", song by Soulsavers from Angels & Ghosts 2015
- "You Owe Me", a single by Malcolm Todd 2024
