= Old gold (disambiguation) =

Old gold is a colour.

Old gold or Old Gold can also refer to:

- Old Gold Mountain, the Chinese name for San Francisco
- Old Gold (cigarette), an American cigarette brand
- Cadbury Old Gold, a brand of Australian dark chocolate
- In gold mining, gold of any size, found in an old streambed or parts thereof that have washed into the waterway, or gold found contained within hardpan would be considered "old gold"

== See also ==
- Old Gold 1989–1991, a compilation album by noise rock band Cows
- Olde English 800, an American brand of malt liquor
