= Mary Lou Lord/Sean Na Na Split EP =

EP by Sean Na Na and Mary Lou Lord
- Released: February 2000
- Label: Kill Rock Stars

Mary Lou Lord/Sean Na Na is a split EP released in February 2000 by indie label Kill Rock Stars. It features three songs each by Sean Na Na and singer/songwriter Mary Lou Lord.

== Track listing ==
1. Mary Lou Lord - "Bang Bang"
2. Mary Lou Lord - "Hard Road"
3. Mary Lou Lord - "Aim Low"
4. Sean Na Na - "Princess and the Pony"
5. Sean Na Na - "Stretch Marks"
6. Sean Na Na - "My Old France"
