= Bricks and Blackouts =

Studio album by Gaunt
- Released: March 24, 1998
- Studio: Pachyderm
- Genre: Punk rock
- Label: Warner Bros.
- Producer: Brian Paulson, Gaunt, Tim Mac

Gaunt chronology
Kryptonite (1996)	Bricks and Blackouts (1998)

Bricks and Blackouts is an album by the American band Gaunt, released in 1998. The album was not promoted by Warner Bros. Records, due to huge layoffs in their marketing division. Gaunt supported the album with a North American tour.

It was Gaunt's final album; in January 2001, frontman Jerry Wick died while riding his bike.

== Production ==
The album was produced in part by Brian Paulson. It was recorded at Pachyderm Studio, in Cannon Falls, Minnesota. While the band's sound was poppier than in the past, the lyrics reflected the difficult year the band endured prior to the recordings sessions. "Dancin' When You're Down" employs a horn section.

== Critical reception ==
Professional ratings
Review scores
Source	Rating
AllMusic	3.5/5 stars
Chicago Tribune	2/4 stars
Pitchfork	6.6/10
Reno Gazette-Journal	1.5/4 stars

The Chicago Reader thought that "the shrieking rage that fueled the earlier records has either dissipated or been groomed away; if Bricks and Blackouts achieves nothing else, perhaps it will dispel the pernicious myth that Warner Brothers is an artist-friendly label." CMJ New Music Monthly opined that Gaunt possessed "an innate understanding that copies nothing but examines various elements, in the process creating something hard, passionate and timeless." The Plain Dealer declared that Gaunt "may tear through short songs like punks with no tomorrow, but their attention to melodic detail bears the unavoidable influence of the mainstream rock that rules the airwaves in [the Midwest]."

The Fort Lauderdale Sun-Sentinel wrote: "Recycling AC/DC riffs through a squall of digital noise—modem beeps and so forth—Gaunt counts up suburbia's casualties in the information age." The Washington Post called the album "excellent," writing that Wick "writes fast, melodic, punchy songs in the tradition of the Saints and Superchunk." Miami New Times thought that "'Mixed Metals' and 'Don't Tell' chart the remarkable growth of Gaunt as a band and Wick as one of the underground's best songwriters."

AllMusic wrote that the album "has a shaky foundation and too many songwriting and production lapses to complete its potential."

== Track listing ==
No.	Title	Length
1.	"Anxiety"
2.	"97th Tear"
3.	"Mixed Metals"
4.	"Different Drum Machine"
5.	"Glitter"
6.	"Bricks and Blackouts"
7.	"Pop Song"
8.	"Don't Tell"
9.	"Maybe in the Next World"
10.	"Far Away"
11.	"Duh"
12.	"Powder Keg Variety"
13.	"On Fire"
14.	"Honor Roll"
15.	"Dancin' When You're Down"
