= Mama Womb Womb =

Studio album by God Bullies
- Released: 1989
- Genre: Noise rock
- Length: 40:03
- Label: Amphetamine Reptile

God Bullies chronology
Plastic Eye Miracle (1988)	Mama Womb Womb (1989)	Dog Show (1990)

Mama Womb Womb is the second album by God Bullies, released in 1989 through Amphetamine Reptile Records.

== Track listing ==
All tracks are written by God Bullies, except "Red Blood" with words by Georg Büchner.

Side one
No.	Title	Length
1.	"Act of Desire"	5:37
2.	"Creepy People"	3:02
3.	"O Shit"	3:29
4.	"Fear and Pain"	3:12
5.	"What Reason"	3:39
6.	"The Godfather Moves to Arkansas, Part 1"	1:04

Side two
No.	Title	Length
1.	"Follow the Leader"	3:52
2.	"Sex Power Money"	3:49
3.	"Red Blood"	2:15
4.	"All I Want Is My Mamma"	3:48
5.	"What Are You Looking For"	6:16

== Personnel ==
God Bullies

- Adam Berg – drums, percussion
- Mike Corso – bass guitar
- Mike Hard – vocals
- David B. Livingstone – guitar, keyboards, engineering, mixing

Production and additional personnel

- Sue Moulds – backing vocals
