= The Crybaby =

Studio album by Melvins
- Released: February 7, 2000
- Recorded: 1999–2000
- Genre: Sludge metal, alternative metal, alternative rock, country
- Length: 73:03
- Label: Ipecac
- Producer: Melvins, Tim Green, Tool, Ryeland Allison, Vince DeFranco

Melvins chronology
The Bootlicker (1999)	The Crybaby (2000)	The Trilogy Vinyl (2000)

Professional ratings
Review scores
Source	Rating
AllMusic	3/5 stars
Pitchfork	6.7/10
Spin	5/10

The Crybaby is the twelfth studio album by American rock band Melvins, released in 2000 through Ipecac Recordings. It is the last part of a trilogy preceded by The Maggot and The Bootlicker. The trilogy was later released on vinyl by Ipecac Recordings (The Trilogy Vinyl, February 7, 2000), although the song "Divorced" was edited down and the last four tracks were excluded.

== Track listing ==
The Crybaby track listing
No.	Title	Writer(s)	Length
1.	"Smells Like Teen Spirit"	Nirvana	5:01
2.	"Blockbuster"	The Jesus Lizard	3:09
3.	"Ramblin' Man"	Hank Williams	3:14
4.	"G.I. Joe"	Mike Patton, Kevin Rutmanis	3:59
5.	"Mine Is No Disgrace"	Buzz Osborne, J. G. Thirlwell	8:21
6.	"Spineless"	Erik Sanko	4:01
7.	"Divorced w/ Tool"	Dale Crover, Melvins	14:42
8.	"Dry Drunk" (with Interlude by Godzik Pink)	Osborne, David Yow	4:03
9.	"Okie from Muskogee"	Merle Haggard	2:10
10.	"The Man with the Laughing Hand Is Dead"	Osborne, Bliss Blood	11:26
11.	"Moon Pie"	Osborne, Sharp	12:44
Total length:			73:03

== Personnel ==
- King Buzzo – guitar (1–3, 5–11), bass (1), noise (4)
- Dale Crover – drums (1, 3, 5–11), Mattel drums & guitar (2), noise (4), vocals (9)
- Kevin Rutmanis – bass (2–11), slide bass (2 & 8); oscillator, harmonica, metronome, voice, guitar & engineer (4); vocals (8)

=== Guests ===
- Leif Garrett – vocals (1)
- David Yow – vocals (2 & 8)
- Hank Williams III – guitar (3), vocals (3 & 9)
- Henry Bogdan – steel guitar (3 & 9)
- Mike Patton – vocals, sampler, guitar, percussion & engineer (4)
- J. G. Thirlwell – vocals, samples, engineer & mixing (5)
- Erik Sanko – guitar & vocals (6)
- Rick Lee – trash & samples (6)
- Amanda Ferguson – vocals (6)
- Bruce Bromberg – guitar (6)
- Tool – producer (7)
- Godzik Pink – "Interlude" (8)
- Bliss Blood – vocals, Wurlitzer treated vocal, electric sitar, musical saws & Señor Wences samples (10)
- Kevin Sharp – vocals & samples (11)

=== Additional personnel ===
- Tim Green – producer, engineer (1 [drums only], 4 & 5), mixing (6)
- Billy Howerdel – mixing (1), guitar & bass engineer (1)
- Roderick Kohn – engineer (6)
- Vince DeFranco – producer (7)
- Ryeland Allison – producer (7)
- Sir David Scott Stone – engineer (8 ["Interlude"])
- Kurt Wolf – engineer (10)
- Mackie Osborne – art
