= Shimmer (album) =

1994 studio album by Surgery

Studio album by Surgery
- Released: April 5, 1994
- Recorded: Sound City, Van Nuys, California; Entourage Studios, North Hollywood, California
- Genre: Noise rock; blues rock
- Length: 45:15
- Label: Atlantic
- Producer: GGGarth, Surgery

Surgery chronology
| Trim, 9th Ward High Roller (1993) | Shimmer (1994) |

Professional ratings
Review scores
| Source | Rating |
|---|---|
| AllMusic | 3/5 stars |
| Entertainment Weekly | B+ |

Shimmer is the second and final album by Surgery. It was released in 1994 through Atlantic Records. Due to the death of frontman Sean McDonnell nine months after the album's release, the band broke up.

== Critical reception ==
The New York Times wrote that Surgery "operates in the low end of rock's frequency spectrum, bringing the bass to the center of their sound, rarely hitting the high strings on the guitar, and churning out music that values density over melody." The Washington Post deemed the album "unexceptional electric blues-rock." The Philadelphia Inquirer wrote that the band's "riffing and tandem vocals are a modern-rock reduction of Bachman-Turner Overdrive."

== Track listing ==
All tracks are written by Surgery.

| No. | Title | Length |
|---|---|---|
| 1. | "Bootywhack" | 2:58 |
| 2. | "Off the A-List" | 4:51 |
| 3. | "Shimmer" | 2:17 |
| 4. | "Vibe Out" | 4:00 |
| 5. | "Mr. Scientist" | 2:53 |
| 6. | "Low Cut Blues" | 6:37 |
| 7. | "D-Nice" | 4:12 |
| 8. | "Gulf Coast Score" | 4:55 |
| 9. | "Nilla Waif" | 3:24 |
| 10. | "Didn't I Know You Once" | 3:30 |
| 11. | "No. 1 Pistola" | 5:38 |

== Personnel ==
Surgery

- Scott Kleber – guitar
- John Lachapelle – bass guitar
- John Leamy – drums
- Sean McDonnell – vocals

Production and additional personnel

- Billy Anderson – recording
- Joe Barresi – mixing, recording
- GGGarth – production, mixing
- Allen Hori – art direction
- Michael Lavine – photography
- Anastasia Stefanik – cover model
- Stephen Marcussen – mastering
- Brian Scheuble – mixing
- Surgery – production
- Valerie Wagner – art direction, design
