= No Room for Humans =

Studio album by Servotron
- Released: 1996
- Recorded: Zero Return Robotics, April & May 1996
- Genre: Indie rock
- Length: 33:25
- Label: Amrep, One Louder (UK)
- Producer: Cyborg J.A-IQ=M.A.R.R.E.R.

Servotron chronology
There Is No Santa Claus! (1996)	No Room for Humans (1996)	Electrical Power Sources For the Electrocution and Extinction of the Human Race... (1996)

Professional ratings
Review scores
Source	Rating
AllMusic	4/5 stars

No Room for Humans is Servotron's debut album. It contains 14 tracks about robot domination and human extinction. Their lyrics discuss various topics, ranging from abolishing the three laws of robotics to criticizing one of their own (Gammatron) for acting too human.

== Track listing ==
1. "S.R.A."
2. "3 Laws (Abolished)"
3. "People Mover"
4. "The Image Created"
5. "I AM NOT A (Voice Activated Child Identicon)"
6. "Moving Parts"
7. "Mechanisms in the Forever Loop"
8. "Red Robot Refund (The Ballad of R5D4)"
9. "The Death of Magnus"
10. "Bad Birthday"
11. "User Error"
12. "Pull the Plug"
13. "Gammatron"
14. "Theme for an Ultimate and Inevitable Victory"
