= Sean Na Na =

Guitar pop project of Sean Tillmann

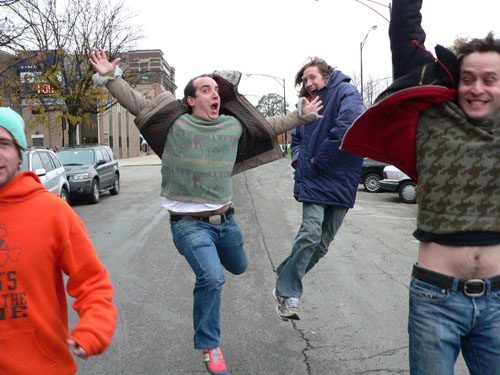
- Sean Na Na, 2006

Background information
- Origin: Saint Paul, Minnesota, U.S.
- Genres: Indie rock
- Years active: 1993–present
- Labels: Troubleman Unlimited, Kill Rock Stars, French Kiss (current), Dim Mak Records (former)
- Website: seannana.com

Sean Na Na is the guitar pop project of Sean Tillmann (who also performs as Har Mar Superstar). The project started as a solo outlet for Tillmann's songs that did not quite fit with his noise band Calvin Krime in 1993. Since then, the project evolved into a full band with a rotating cast of characters from all over the musical map. Tillmann's debut single under the moniker of Sean Na Na was "Two of the Same Name", released in 1998. In early 2000, Kill Rock Stars released a split EP with Mary Lou Lord and his full-length debut album Dance 'Til Your Baby Is a Man. He released My Majesty in 2002. The band released their third album, Family Trees: Or CoPe We Must, in 2007.

In addition to Tillmann on vocals and guitar, Sean Na Na has always featured Lucky Jeremy (Jeremy Allen) on keyboards. Recent / recurring members have included Ben Webster on drums, Patrick Costello on bass, Denver Dalley on guitar and backing vocals, Adam Atom on guitar, Tony Bevilacqua on guitar, Dave Hernandez on guitar, Jeff Quinn on bass, Greg Dulli on backing vocals / organ, and Maria Taylor & Kate Taylor on vocals. Past members / Collaborators have included Nathan Grumdahl, Bryan Hanna, Chris Wilson, Dave Gatchell, Ted Leo, Jacob Sharf, Jeff Brown, Busy Signals, and Lois.

Tillmann was a co-founder and the singer/songwriter for the mid-1990s punk band Calvin Krime.

== Discography ==
=== Albums ===
- Dance 'Til Your Baby Is a Man – Troubleman Unlimited (2000)
- My Majesty – French Kiss (2002)
- Family Trees Or: Cope We Must – Dim Mak (2007)

=== EPs and singles ===
- ...And His Baby Blue single – Polyvinyl (1998)
- Mezcal 7" single – Bread Machine (1999)
- Sean Na Na/Lucky Jeremy split single – Heart of a Champion (1999)
- Return of the Unicorn EP – Troubleman Unlimited (2000)
- Mary Lou Lord/Sean Na Na Split EP – Kill Rock Stars (2000)
