= Meet Your Mechanical Masters =

EP by Servotron
- Released: 1995
- Recorded: Zero Return Manufacturing Center A-5 1995
- Genre: indie rock
- Label: Sympathy for the Record Industry

Servotron chronology
Meet Your Mechanical Masters (1995)	Batteries Included (1996)

Meet Your Mechanical Masters was Servotron's debut release. It was released in 1995 on Sympathy for the Record Industry (cited on the sleeve as Sympathy for the Machines). This single was released on purple vinyl and black vinyl. It was re-released as a silver circuit board picture disc as the "Super Expensive Ultra Limited Totally Bitchen' Silver Disc". "People Mover" is a song about trains at the Atlanta Airport.

== Track listing ==
- RAM Side: "People Mover"
- ROM Side: "Slave to the Metal Horde"

== Machines of Sonic Manipulation ==
- MACHINE 1 = Z4 - OBX: Mechanical percussion sync and electronic rhythmic reinforcement
- MACHINE 2 = Proto Unit V3: Synthesized key sequences, replicated female voice, melody matrix
- MACHINE 3 = 339837X: Interactive mechanisms of monotonic expression of dissension, synthetic speech patterns used in context of modern systems of melodic infusion
- MACHINE 4 = -... .- ... ... -... --- -: Low frequency data and feedback loop

== Other credits ==
- No Humans were involved in this completely digital recording process
- Illustration & Design by Shag
- Guitar & Vocals - 339837X
