= Servotron 9000 =

EP by Servotron
- Released: 1996
- Recorded: 3.8.96 @ Rock Central
- Genre: indie rock
- Label: Drug Racer

Servotron chronology
Electrical Power Sources For the Electrocution and Extinction of the Human Race... (1996)	Servotron 9000 (1996)	Product for Mass Consumption (1997)

Servotron 9000 was one of five singles Servotron released in 1996. It was released opaque blue vinyl only on Drug Racer. The sleeve reads "Foolish Human: Play at 45 RPM". The insert resembles a Business Reply Mail card but reads "Assimilation Reply Mail" and states "No Postage Necessary If Mailed in the SRA Territory". The options on the back read:

- Yes! Please register me for assimilation into the robot horde. I understand that my humanity will be destroyed, and that resistance is useless.
- No, I prefer the futility of the human infestation, and will perish with misery at the hands of the SRA for my inferior logic.
- Kill me later.

The record label reads:

A gas of peculiar odor like that of bitter almonds. It is soluble in water, alcohol and ether and is exceedingly poisonous. Explosions are apt to occur if kept in closed containers because of the generation of gas caused by the exothermic polymerization and decomposition of the liquid. Cyanide causes hypoxia, loss of consciousness, and muscular paralysis, which lead to respiratory and cardiac failure. Forced orally upon human scum by order of the Servotron Robot Allegiance.

== Track listing ==
- <<Step 1..>:<<"S.R.A."
- <<Step 2..>:<<"Speak + Spell"
- <<Step 3..>:<<"Goodnight to HAL"
- <<Step 4..>:<<"S.R.A."

== Line up ==
- MACHINE 1: Z4-OBX
- MACHINE 2: Proto Unit V3
- MACHINE 3: 00ZX1
- MACHINE 4: Gammatron
