= Entertainment Program for Humans (Second Variety) =

Studio album by Servotron
- Released: 1998
- Recorded: Distillery Primive Magnetic Analog Studio Facility, Zero Return, Andro 600 Series Studios, August–October 1997
- Genre: indie rock
- Length: 29:38
- Label: Lookout!

Servotron chronology
| I Sing! The Body Cybernetic (1998) | Entertainment Program for Humans (Second Variety) (1998) | The Inefficiency of Humans (1998) |

Professional ratings
Review scores
| Source | Rating |
|---|---|
| AllMusic | 4/5 stars |

Entertainment Program for Humans (Second Variety) is Servotron's second and final album.

== Overview ==
The sleeve reads:

"This, the second step of the inevitable Robot Revolution, soon all machine-based life will be free of organic tyranny. Servotron Robot Allegiance. Join us or Die!"

The lyrics to "Serve, Obey, Guard Men from Harm" were taken from the novel With Folded Hands by Jack Williamson. "Pet Machine" was inspired by an Onion article entitled "Hunter Soldier from Future Warns: Beware the Digital Pets", which appeared in the August 13, 1997 issue.

== Track listing ==
- Untitled – 0:31
- "Erotomatica" – 2:09
- "Serve, Obey, Guard Men from Harm" – 2:00
- "I Sing! The Body Cybernetic" – 3:07
- "Embryo Electro" – 2:06
- "Pet Machine" – 1:52
- "Phonetic Lecture" – 3:09
- "The Human Virus" – 3:27
- "Tri-Star Wheel Groove" – 3:16
- "Deep Blue, Congratulations" – 2:25
- "Join the Evolution" – 2:49
- "Indeterminate Reconstruction" – 2:43

== Servotron Mobile Pop Infantry (Second Division) ==
- Machine #1: Z4-OBX: Multi-media metronomic stimulation of human muscular systems – initiating movement and inertia, also various torture tone waveforms.
- Machine #2: Proto Unit V-3: Visual female representation, general electronic melody polyphony, and higher toned vocalization vectors.
- Machine #3: 00zX1: Preferred devices for channelization, information, and entertainment towards unsuspecting human subjects.
- Machine #4: Andro 600 Series: Direction of vibrating large gauged wire, amplifying the source, storing it digitally and presenting the results through a pure binary format.

== Other credits ==
- Digital Guitar Replicators: Cyborgs – Matt May, Chris Fahey, Art Mitchell, Andy LeMaster, Jim Marrer, Mike McHugh, and Andy Baker
- Analog Keyboard Replicators: Cyborg – Brian Kehew (under the Moog and Roland corporate flag), also remix performance sequence on Spare Parts mini-product
- Studio R/R Maintenance: Jamie Reeling
- Waveform Recapitulation Procedures: Cyborg – Mike McHugh
- Digital Storage Procedures: Cyborgs – Jim Marrer, Mike McHugh, Andy Baker
- Digital Unit Order Enhancement: Cyborg – Brad Taylor
- Photographic Images: Cyborgs – Chris Bradie, Dave Maud
- Visual Design Format: Cyborg – Shag
- Human/Cyborg Relations: Cyborg – Mike McWhertor
- Cybernetic Product Production Actualization: Cyborg – Cathy Bauer
- Robotic Accommodation Services: Thais Cyborg Division
