= War on Everybody =

Studio album by God Bullies
- Released: 1991
- Recorded: Summer and Fall 1991
- Studios: Death Jam, Detroit, Michigan
- Genre: Noise rock
- Length: 38:28
- Label: Amphetamine Reptile

God Bullies chronology
| Dog Show (1990) | War on Everybody (1991) | Kill the King (1994) |

Professional ratings
Review scores
| Source | Rating |
|---|---|
| AllMusic | 3/5 stars |

War on Everybody is the fourth album by God Bullies, released in 1991 through Amphetamine Reptile Records.

== Track listing ==
All tracks are written by God Bullies.

| No. | Title | Length |
|---|---|---|
| 1. | "Book Report Time" | 3:07 |
| 2. | "I Want to Kill You" | 3:17 |
| 3. | "Ordinary Man" | 2:41 |
| 4. | "Automaker" | 2:58 |
| 5. | "Long Way Home" | 2:37 |
| 6. | "Peace and Love" | 4:00 |
| 7. | "Senojmot" | 1:10 |
| 8. | "Magical Butterfly" | 3:42 |
| 9. | "Pet Monkey" | 1:34 |
| 10. | "Andre" | 3:05 |
| 11. | "Safety Zone" | 6:26 |
| 12. | "Saw You Dead" | 3:51 |

== Personnel ==
God Bullies

- Mike Hard – vocals
- David B. Livingstone – guitar, synthesizer, sampler, tape, engineering, mixing
- Tony Oliveri – drums
- Eric Polcyn – bass guitar

Production and additional personnel

- Adam Berg – drums on "Senojmot"
- Mike Corso – keyboards on "Senojmot"
- Bruce White – vocals on "Book Report Time"
