= Calvin Krime =

American punk rock band, active 1995–1998

- Origin: Minneapolis, Minnesota, U.S.
- Genres: Hardcore punk, post-hardcore, punk rock, noise
- Years active: 1995–1998
- Labels: Amphetamine Reptile, Polyvinyl
- Past members: Sean Tillmann; Jon Kelson; Jason Ralph

Calvin Krime was a hardcore band in Minneapolis, Minnesota, during the late 1990s. The trio formed in 1995 when Sean Tillmann, Jon Kelson, and Jason Ralph met at Perpich Center for Arts Education while in their teens. Signed to Amphetamine Reptile, their primary audience was in the punk and noise scene dominant in South Minneapolis at the time. Usually, Calvin Krime was booked in smaller venues and often at house parties. During their three-and-a-half years together, they released two albums (Dress for the Future and You're Feeling So Attractive) and an EP (3x3x3 1/2). The group disbanded in 1998. Afterwards, all the members went on to other bands, including Sean Tillmann, who went on first to Sean Na Na and then to his persona as Har Mar Superstar.

Eleven years after their break-up, Calvin Krime played a reunion show at the Uptown Bar in Minneapolis, Minnesota, on September 13, 2009. Tillmann, Kelson and Ralph also reunited to play The Amphetamine Reptile 25th Anniversary gala on August 29, 2010.

== Members ==
- Sean Tillmann bass, vocals, keyboard
- Jon Kelson guitar, vocals
- Jason Ralph drums

== Discography ==
- Calvin Krime - Pretty in Pink 7-inch (1995)
- Calvin Krime - Kids Incarcerated 7-inch (1996)
- Calvin Krime - Dress for the Future (1997) Amphetamine Reptile
- Calvin Krime - You're Feeling So Attractive (1998) Amphetamine Reptile
- Calvin Krime - 3x3x3 1/2 (1998) Polyvinyl
- Calvin Krime - Dope-Guns-N'-Fucking in the Streets, Vol. 11 compilation Amphetamine Reptile

== Related bands ==
- Har Mar Superstar
- Seaquest
- Sean Na Na
- Shotgun Monday
