= Souleater =

EP by Surgery
- Released: 1989
- Recorded: Noise New York City City
- Genre: Noise rock
- Length: 16:42
- Label: Circuit
- Producer: Kramer, Surgery

Surgery chronology
| Souleater (1989) | Nationwide (1990) |

Souleater is an EP by Surgery. It was released in 1989 through Circuit Records.

== Track listing ==
All tracks are written by Surgery.

Side one
| No. | Title | Length |
|---|---|---|
| 1. | "Dance" | 2:13 |
| 2. | "Brazier" | 2:21 |
| 3. | "Goodtime" | 3:06 |

Side two
| No. | Title | Length |
|---|---|---|
| 1. | "Stupid Chile'" | 2:31 |
| 2. | "Slap" | 3:54 |
| 3. | "Souleater" | 2:37 |

== Personnel ==
Surgery

- Scott Kleber – guitar
- John Lachapelle – bass guitar
- John Leamy – drums
- Sean McDonnell – vocals, guitar

Production and additional personnel

- Kramer – production, engineering
- Surgery – production
