= Kevin Rutmanis =

American musician

- Born: October 17, 1958 (age 67)
- Genres: Noise rock, experimental rock, alternative metal
- Occupation: Musician
- Instruments: Bass guitar, slide bass
- Years active: 1985–present
- Labels: Ipecac Recordings, Amphetamine Reptile Records

Kevin Rutmanis (born October 17, 1958) is an American bass guitarist. He is of Latvian descent. Before getting into music, he was a student teacher. In late 1985, along with his younger brother Sandris Rutmanis, Thor Eisentrager, and then Jayhawks drummer Norm Rogers, he started the band The Cows. After the dissolution of The Cows, Rutmanis was the bass guitar player for The Melvins from 1998 to 2005. He was also the bass guitarist in the supergroup Tomahawk featuring Mike Patton. Kevin played bass on Tomahawk's first two long play releases, titled Tomahawk and Mit Gas, and played for two world tours supporting those albums. He has since recorded with Hepa-Titus.

== Discography ==
=== Cows ===
- 1987 – Taint Pluribus Taint Unum
- 1989 – Daddy Has a Tail
- 1990 – Effete and Impudent Snobs
- 1991 – Peacetika
- 1992 – Cunning Stunts
- 1993 – Sexy Pee Story
- 1994 – Orphan's Tragedy
- 1996 – Whorn
- 1998 – Sorry in Pig Minor

=== Melvins ===
- 1999 – The Maggot
- 1999 – The Bootlicker
- 2000 – The Crybaby
- 2001 – Electroretard
- 2001 – Colossus of Destiny
- 2002 – Hostile Ambient Takeover
- 2004 – Pigs of the Roman Empire (with Lustmord)
- 2004 – Never Breathe What You Can't See (with Jello Biafra)
- 2005 – Sieg Howdy! (with Jello Biafra)
- 2013 – Everybody Loves Sausages (guest appearance)
- 2015 – "Dumb Numbers" Split Series
- 2016 – Three Men and a Baby (with Mike Kunka)

=== Tomahawk ===
- 2001 – Tomahawk
- 2003 – Mit Gas

=== Hepa/Titus ===
- 2011 - The Giving Brain
- 2012 - Follow Me
- 2014 - Gettin' It On
- 2016 - FM Warm Weather
- 2017 - Omega Pig
- 2018 - Champagne of Incest
- 2019 - Blue Fat Pussy
- 2023 - Uneat

=== Teenage Larvae ===
- 1993 - Songs For Pigs
- 2017 - Omega Pig
