= Hammerhead (band) =

American noise rock band

- Origin: Moorhead, Minnesota, Minneapolis, United States
- Genres: Noise rock
- Years active: 1990–1996, 2010–2021
- Label: Amphetamine Reptile,
- Members: Paul Erickson; Jeff Mooridian Jr. Paul Sanders
- Past members: Kat Bjelland

Hammerhead was an American, Minneapolis-based noise rock band, active in the early 1990s. Members went on to form the band Vaz.

== History ==
Hammerhead was formed in Moorhead, Minnesota in the early 1990s, with members Paul Erickson, Jeff Mooridian Jr. and Paul Sanders, later moving to Minneapolis. The band released extensively through Amphetamine Reptile Records. Their major breakthrough album Duh the Big City garnered them critical acclaim, however after its release Paul Sanders left the group. The remaining members went on to form Vaz after experimenting with other line-ups.

In 2010 the band reunited and released an EP of new material, Memory Hole EP, the following year. In 2014 they released a new EP, Global Depression, and in August 2015 they published New Directionz, their first full-length album since regrouping in 2010.

== Discography ==
Full Discography including 7" and splits

=== Albums ===
- Ethereal Killer LP/CD (Amphetamine Reptile Records, 1993, ARR 36/226, amrep 012)
- Into the Vortex LP/CD (Amphetamine Reptile Records, 1994, ARR 50/323,amrep 026)
- Duh, the Big City LP/CD (Amphetamine Reptile Records, 1996, ARR/ARRCD 69/012 amrep 042)
- New Directionz (2015)

=== Singles ===
- "Peep" 7" (Amphetamine Reptile Records, 1991, scale 42) picture disc, research and development series
- "Load King" 7" (Amphetamine Reptile Records, 1992, scale 46) tour only
- "Evil Twin" 10" (Amphetamine Reptile Records, 1993, scale 61) tour only
- "Earth I Won't Miss" 7" (Amphetamine Reptile Records, year ?, scale 70) tour only

=== Splits ===
- "split" 7" (OXO Records, 1993, OXO 008)
- "Porn No. 1" 7" (Amphetamine Reptile Records, 1995, scale 72)

=== EPs ===
- Evil Twin 10"/MCD (Amphetamine Reptile Records, 1993, ARR 47/306,amrep 024)
- Memory Hole EP (Amphetamine Reptile Records, 2011) tour and digital release.
- Global Depression (Learning Curve Records, 2014) tour and digital release.
