= The Maggot =

Studio album by Melvins
- Released: May 17, 1999
- Recorded: January 1999
- Genre: Sludge metal
- Length: 40:00
- Label: Ipecac
- Producer: Melvins & Tim Green

Melvins chronology
Alive at the Fucker Club (1998)	The Maggot (1999)	The Bootlicker (1999)

Professional ratings
Review scores
Source	Rating
AllMusic	2.5/5 stars

The Maggot is the tenth studio album by American rock band Melvins, released in 1999 through Ipecac Recordings. It is the first part of a trilogy followed by The Bootlicker and The Crybaby. The Trilogy was later released on vinyl by Ipecac Recordings (The Trilogy Vinyl, November 27, 2000).

On the CD version, all songs are split into two tracks. A 2006 reissue of the album swaps the background artwork with The Bootlicker.

== Track listing ==
All tracks are written by Buzz Osborne, except where noted.

No.	Title	Writer(s)	Length
1.	"Amazon"		0:50
2.	"Amazon"		0:51
3.	"AMAZON"		2:50
4.	"AMAZON"		2:53
5.	"We All Love JUDY"		1:14
6.	"We All Love JUDY"		1:17
7.	"Manky"		3:41
8.	"Manky"		3:45
9.	"The Green Manalishi (With the Two-Pronged Crown)"	Peter Green	3:27
10.	"The Green Manalishi (With the Two-Pronged Crown)"	Peter Green	3:27
11.	"The Horn Bearer"		1:12
12.	"The Horn Bearer"		1:15
13.	"Judy"		1:17
14.	"Judy"		1:18
15.	"See How Pretty, See How Smart"		4:29
16.	"See How Pretty, See How Smart"		6:04
Total length:			40:00

== Personnel ==
- King Buzzo – vocals, guitar, bass
- Dale Crover – drums, guitar, vocals
- Kevin Rutmanis – bass, slide bass, screaming

=== Additional personnel ===
- Tim Green – producer
- Mackie Osborne – art
