= Surgery (band) =

American noise rock band

Background information
- Origin: Hartford, Connecticut, United States
- Genres: Noise rock
- Years active: 1987–1995
- Label: Amphetamine Reptile
- Past members: Scott Kleber; John Lachapelle; John Leamy; Sean McDonnell

Surgery was an American noise rock band formed in 1987 by Scott Kleber, John Lachapelle, John Leamy and Sean McDonnell in Syracuse, New York, and released two full-length albums and two EPs before ending with the sudden death of singer Sean McDonnell.

== History ==
Surgery was formed at Syracuse University in 1987. They released their debut EP "Souleater" on the short-lived Circuit Records in 1989 before releasing their full length debut Nationwide through Amphetamine Reptile, a label known for its noisy, abrasive acts, in 1990. The band released the EP Trim, 9th Ward High Roller in 1993, which presented tighter musicianship coupled more straightforward approach to their sound. With the help of Kim Gordon, Trim found its way into the hands of Atlantic Records, who liked the band enough to sign them to the label. Through Atlantic, the band released their second album Shimmer in 1994 with the intention of touring extensively to broaden their fan base.

On January 7, 1995, McDonnell suffered a severe asthma attack and went into a comatose state. He was admitted to Brooklyn Hospital and died four days later. Tom Hazelmyer, founder of Amphetamine Reptile Records and a close friend of McDonnell, felt that his excessive partying and active nightlife had contributed to his death. Feeling unable to continue, the remaining members of Surgery decided to part ways.

== Discography ==
Studio albums

- Nationwide (1990, Amphetamine Reptile)
- Shimmer (1994, Atlantic)

EPs

- Souleater (1989, Circuit)
- Trim, 9th Ward High Roller (1993, Amphetamine Reptile)
