= Evil Twin (EP) =

EP by Hammerhead
- Released: December 7, 1993
- Recorded: 1991–August 4, 1993
- Genre: Noise rock
- Length: 18:42
- Label: Amphetamine Reptile

Hammerhead chronology
Ethereal Killer (1992)	Evil Twin (1993)	Into the Vortex (1994)

Evil Twin is an EP by Hammerhead, released on December 7, 1993, through Amphetamine Reptile Records.

== Track listing ==
All tracks are written by Hammerhead.

No.	Title	Length
1.	"Evil Twin"	1:45
2.	"Anvil"	2:30
3.	"M.I.A."	2:24
4.	"Washout"	3:01
5.	"Peep"	3:19
6.	"U.V."	1:57
7.	"Load King"	3:46

== Personnel ==
Hammerhead

- Paul Erickson – bass guitar
- Jeff Mooridian Jr. – drums
- Paul Sanders – guitar, vocals

Production and additional personnel

- Tim Mac – recording on "Peep" and "U.V."
- Rick Ness – recording
- Ken Perry – recording
