= Spare Parts (EP) =

EP by Servotron
- Released: 1997
- Recorded: Z-Return, Chunklet Robot Revolution, Andy Baker Robot Rock Central
- Genre: Indie rock
- Length: 25:01
- Labels: Amrep, One Louder (UK)

Servotron chronology
Join the Evolution (1997)	Spare Parts (1997)	I Sing! The Body Cybernetic (1998)

Spare Parts is an EP put out by Servotron between their studio albums. It was released on 10" vinyl and as a CD EP. It is a collection of live tracks and remixes, along with the instrumental studio track All Robots (Report to the Dance Floor). All the songs, with the exception of the aforementioned studio track, have been released in different versions on other albums or singles.

== Track listing ==
1. "People Mover (Maximum Velocity Wedway Mix)"
2. "A.R.T.H.U.R. (Adolescent Response Tactical Hardware Utility Robot) Electric"
3. "Moving Parts (Master Control Internal Hive Mix)"
4. "Batteries Included (Pseudo-Live Automation Sync at Q-ZAR)"
5. "People Mover (Hartsfield Central Routing Electro-Mix)"
6. "All Robots (Report to the Dance Floor)"
7. "To Be Listed (Speech Pattern Cancellation Mix)"
8. "I AM NOT A <Voice Activated Child Identicon> (Pseudo-Live Automation Sync at Q-ZAR)"
