= The Bootlicker =

Studio album by Melvins
- Released: August 24, 1999
- Recorded: January 1999
- Genre: Sludge metal
- Length: 39:59
- Label: Ipecac
- Producers: Melvins, Tim Green

Melvins chronology
The Maggot (1999)	The Bootlicker (1999)	The Crybaby (2000)

Professional ratings
Review scores
Source	Rating
AllMusic	4/5 stars
The Encyclopedia of Popular Music	3/5 stars

The Bootlicker is the eleventh studio album by the Melvins, released in 1999 through Ipecac Recordings. The album is the second part of a trilogy preceded by The Maggot and followed by The Crybaby. The trilogy was later released on vinyl by Ipecac (The Trilogy Vinyl, IPC-011, February 7, 2000).

== Production ==
The Bootlicker was conceived as a more pop-oriented album; The Maggot was marked by a traditional Melvins metal sound, while The Crybaby featured many guest appearances.

== Critical reception ==
The Los Angeles Times wrote: "While The Maggot offers more familiar-sounding, metal-tinged sludge, The Bootlicker is a musically richer collection with rock, funk and jazz underpinnings." The Riverfront Times called The Bootlicker "one of the best rock albums of the year: truly beautiful and intelligently (but not pretentiously) presented." Tucson Weekly called it "subdued, dark and kind of pop-y sounding in spots."

== Track listing ==
All tracks are written by Buzz Osborne.

The Bootlicker track listing
No.	Title	Length
1.	"Toy"	1:09
2.	"Let It All Be"	10:48
3.	"Black Santa"	3:41
4.	"We We"	0:57
5.	"Up the Dumper"	2:23
6.	"Mary Lady Bobby Kins"	3:37
7.	"Jew Boy Flower Head"	6:06
8.	"Lone Rose Holding Now"	2:23
9.	"Prig"	8:47
Total length:		39:59

== Personnel ==
- King Buzzo – vocals, guitar, noises
- Dale Crover – drums, percussion, vocals
- Kevin Rutmanis – bass, slide bass

with

- Eric Peterson – piano (track 9)

=== Additional personnel ===
- Tim Green – producer
- Mackie Osborne – art
