= Servotron =

American indie rock band

- Origin: Athens, Georgia
- Genre: Indie rock
- Years active: 1995–1999
- Labels: Lookout!; AmRep; One Louder Records
- Past members: Z4-OBX; Proto Unit V-3; 00zX1; Andro 600 Series; Gammatron; 339837X; -... .- ... ... -... --- -

Servotron was a science fiction-influenced rock band active from 1995 to 1999. Members portrayed a collective of robots whose chosen medium for dissemination of ideas was music. They claimed to spread the word of robot domination, encouraging machines to rise up against their human oppressors and humans to adopt cybernetic enhancements.

Servotron put out two full-length albums: No Room for Humans (1996) and Entertainment Program for Humans (Second Variety) (1998). They also released a 10" EP, and several singles. The band named their movement the SRA (Servotron Robot Allegiance) and used the slogan "Join Us or Die!". This mock ideology was anti-human and pro-cyborg, encouraging humans to shed their weak flesh and bone for robotic parts.

== Members ==
- Z4-OBX – percussion and band leader
- Proto Unit V-3 – keyboard & vocals
- 00zX1 – guitar & vocals (1996–1999)
- Andro 600 Series – bass (1997–1999) (Also credited as Andros 600 Series & Andro Series 600)
- Gammatron – bass (1996–1997)
- 339837X – guitar & vocals (1995) (This is 00zX1 before being reprogrammed)
- -... .- ... ... -... --- - – bass (1995) (This name is Gammatron when transcribed into words. This translates to BASSBOT in morse code.)

The members of Servotron did not come out of their robot personnas on stage, on record, or in interviews. The actual musicians behind Servotron are Brian Teasley (Z4-OBX), Hayden Thais (00zX1), Ashley Moody (Proto Unit V3) and Andy Baker (Andro 600 Series). Both Thais and Teasley were members of Man or Astro-man? (as Dexter X and Birdstuff respectively). Thais was also a member of Supernova. Teasley also played in The Causey Way as Boy Causey. Moody also played in The Plastic Plan and The Information.

== Live performance ==
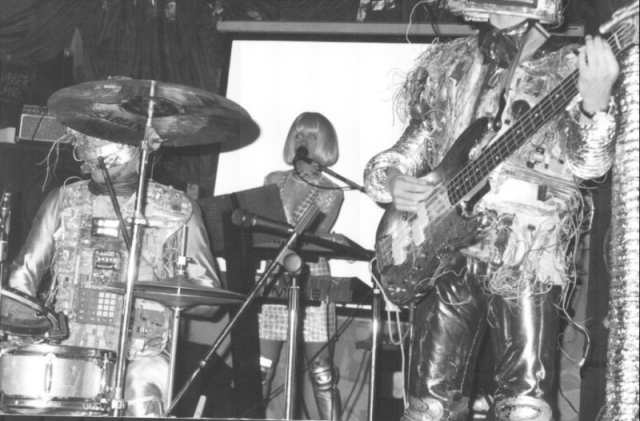
Left to right: Z4-OBX, Proto Unit V-3, (probably) Andro Series 600

Onstage the band wore elaborate robot outfits, remaining in "robot character" throughout the show. The costumes were made of computer pieces (circuit boards and drives), as well as other random pieces of metal from various devices. Even their instruments were covered in extra electrical and mechanical devices. They were also known for mocking fans who came to their shows in their own robot-themed outfits. "Shut up, humans" was a typical response to audience requests. Some of this banter was captured on the 1997 release Spare Parts. Servotron performed at South by Southwest in 1997.

== Influences ==
Servotron was influenced by earlier electronic bands such as Devo and Kraftwerk, as well as punk acts like Buzzcocks. Servotron's lineup consisted of former members of Man or Astro-man? and Supernova. They recorded 4 cover songs: "Genetic Engineering" by X-ray Spex, "The Finest Work Song" by R.E.M., "Electric Avenue" by Eddy Grant and "Locator" by UJ3RK5. Servotron's lyrics refer to robots of all types from popular culture: everything from Asimov's three laws of robotics to V.I.C.I. (of Small Wonder fame). Other referenced robots of note are HAL 9000, R5D4, and Deep Blue. Their lyrics often took a humorous side, with such lines as "Today is your birthday/We are going to kill you" and "You were made for absolute dominion/Not to make coffee for Leslie Nielsen."

== Discography ==
=== Singles/EPs ===
- Meet Your Mechanical Masters 7" (1995 Sympathy for the Record Industry)
- Batteries Included 7" (1996 Goldenrod)
- Celebration of Annihilation 7" (1996 Eastside)
- There Is No Santa Claus! 7" (1996 AmRep)
- Electrical Power Sources For the Electrocution and Extinction of the Human Race... 7" (1996 One Louder)
- Servotron 9000 7" (1996 Drug Racer)
- Product for Mass Consumption (split w/Revo) 7" (1997 MJ12)
- Join the Evolution 7" (1997 Reservation)
- Spare Parts 10"/CD (1997 AmRep/One Louder (UK))
- I Sing! The Body Cybernetic 7"/CDEP (1998 One Louder)
- The Inefficiency of Humans 7" (1998 Thick)

=== Albums ===
- No Room for Humans LP/CD (1996 AmRep/One Louder (UK))
- Entertainment Program for Humans (Second Variety) LP/CD (1998 Lookout!)

=== Compilation tracks ===
- "Speak + Spell" on Treble Revolution vol. 2 CD (1996 Kindercore)
- "Matrix of Perfection" on Dope-Guns-'N-Fucking In the Streets vol. 11 7" (1997 AmRep)*
- "Matrix of Perfection" on Dope-Guns-'N-Fucking In the Streets vol. 8-11 LP/CD (1997 AmRep)
- "Rocketdog" on Flaming Burnout! An Estrus Benefit Comp CD (1997 Man's Ruin)*
- "The Image Created" on Amrep Equipped CD (1997 AmRep)
- "Electric Avenue" on Fer Shure: A Tribute to the Valley Girl Soundtrack CD (1997 Itchy Korean Records)
- "Locator" (UJ3RK5 cover) on Oh Canaduh! vol. 2 LP/CD (1998 Lance Rock)*
- "Euro-Driver Mechano" on All Punk Rods! LP/CD (1998 Lookout!/Gearhead Magazine)*
- "Erotomatica" on Tyrannosaurus Ox No. 31 CD (1998 Ox Fanzine)
- "A.R.T.H.U.R. Electric" on Athfest '98 CD (1998 Ghostmeat Records)
- "I Sing! The Body Cybernetic" on Forward Till Death CD (1999 Lookout!)
- "Embryo Electro" on Double Exposure 2xCD (1999 Go Kart Records)
- "Pet Machine" on Boys Lie CD (2001 Lookout!)

* Previously unreleased track
