= Cows (band) =

Post-hardcore/noise band from Minnesota, active 1987–1998

- From left to right: Kevin Rutmanis, Norm Rogers, Thor Eisentrager and Shannon Selberg.

Background information
- Origin: Minneapolis, Minnesota, United States
- Genres: Noise rock, post-hardcore, hardcore punk
- Years active: 1986–1998
- Labels: Treehouse Records; Amphetamine Reptile Records
- Past members: Band members

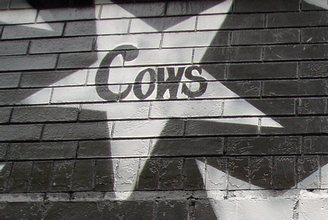
The band's star painted on the side of First Avenue nightclub in Minneapolis

Cows were a noise rock band from Minneapolis, Minnesota who formed in 1986 and disbanded in 1998. The band’s music mixed punk rock with surreal humour and copious amounts of noise played through distorted amplifiers and trumpet bleats, codifying them as a noise rock band. Throughout their career Cows released nine studio albums, all but one on the Minneapolis-based label Amphetamine Reptile Records. A star in honor of the Cows is on the outside mural of First Avenue.

== History ==
Cows formed in 1986 with Kevin Rutmanis on bass, Thor Eisentrager on guitar, then front man Norm Rogers on vocals, and on drums Kevin's younger brother Sandris Rutmanis. Norm Rogers left the band in January 1987 to dedicate his time to drumming for the Jayhawks, later returning to play drums for Cows in 1990. Shannon Selberg became Cows’ front man in February 1987, providing both vocal and bugle duties.

After disbanding, Shannon Selberg went on to front The Heroine Sheiks.

== Live performances ==
Cows were notorious for their raucous live performances. Actions the band have performed onstage include kicking people in the front row, spitting on the stage, throwing the microphone stand into the crowd, throwing food at the crowd, and drawing on themselves, among others. Lead singer Shannon Selberg's trademark is that he has a tattoo illustrating the game Hangman on his body that reads "F_CK" and another tattoo of an anchor with the word "DAD" on top of it. One reviewer wrote about the band's shows, "I have no doubt that the Cows know how to play their instruments. What I don't understand is why they refuse to tune them."

== Legacy ==
Cows have been honored with a star on the outside mural of the Minneapolis nightclub First Avenue, recognizing performers that have played sold-out shows or have otherwise demonstrated a major contribution to the culture at the iconic venue. Receiving a star "might be the most prestigious public honor an artist can receive in Minneapolis," according to journalist Steve Marsh.

== Band members ==
- Shannon Selberg – vocals, bugle, trumpet, trombone (1987–1998)
- Kevin Rutmanis – bass (1987–1998)
- Thor Eisentrager – guitar (1987–1998)
- David van der Steen – fifth udder (1987–1992)
- Sandris Rutmanis – drums (1987–1988)
- Tony Oliveri – drums (1988–1990)
- Norm Rogers – drums (d. 2018) (1990–1995)
- Freddy Votel – drums (1995–1998)

== Discography ==
=== Studio albums ===
- Taint Pluribus Taint Unum – Treehouse Records, 1987
- Daddy Has a Tail! – Amphetamine Reptile Records, 1989
- Effete and Impudent Snobs – Amphetamine Reptile Records, 1990
- Peacetika – Amphetamine Reptile Records, 1991
- Cunning Stunts – Amphetamine Reptile Records, 1992
- Sexy Pee Story – Amphetamine Reptile Records, 1993
- Orphan's Tragedy – Amphetamine Reptile Records, 1994
- Whorn – Amphetamine Reptile Records, 1996
- Sorry in Pig Minor – Amphetamine Reptile Records, 1998

=== Singles and EPs ===
- Chow 7" – Treehouse Records, 1988
- Slap Back 7" – Amphetamine Reptile Records, 1990
- Plowed EP – Amphetamine Reptile Records, 1992
- Woman Inside 7" – Insipid Records, 1992
- Cow Island 7" – Amphetamine Reptile Records, 1994
- The Missing Letter Is You EP – Thick Records, 1998
- Sugar Daddy Live Split Series Vol. 2 – Amphetamine Reptile Records, 2012 (split with the Melvins)

=== Compilations ===
- Old Gold 1989-1991 – Amphetamine Reptile Records, 1995
- Orpheus’ Travesty – KMFMT Records, 1998 (A retrospective album put together by Kevin Rutmanis and Freddy Votel and sold before their final concert)
- Stunning Cunts – Amphetamine Reptile Records, 2014 (Demos from Cunning Stunts)
- Stunning Cunts Vol. 2 – Amphetamine Reptile Records, 2015 (Demos from Cunning Stunts)
