= God Bullies =

American noise-rock band

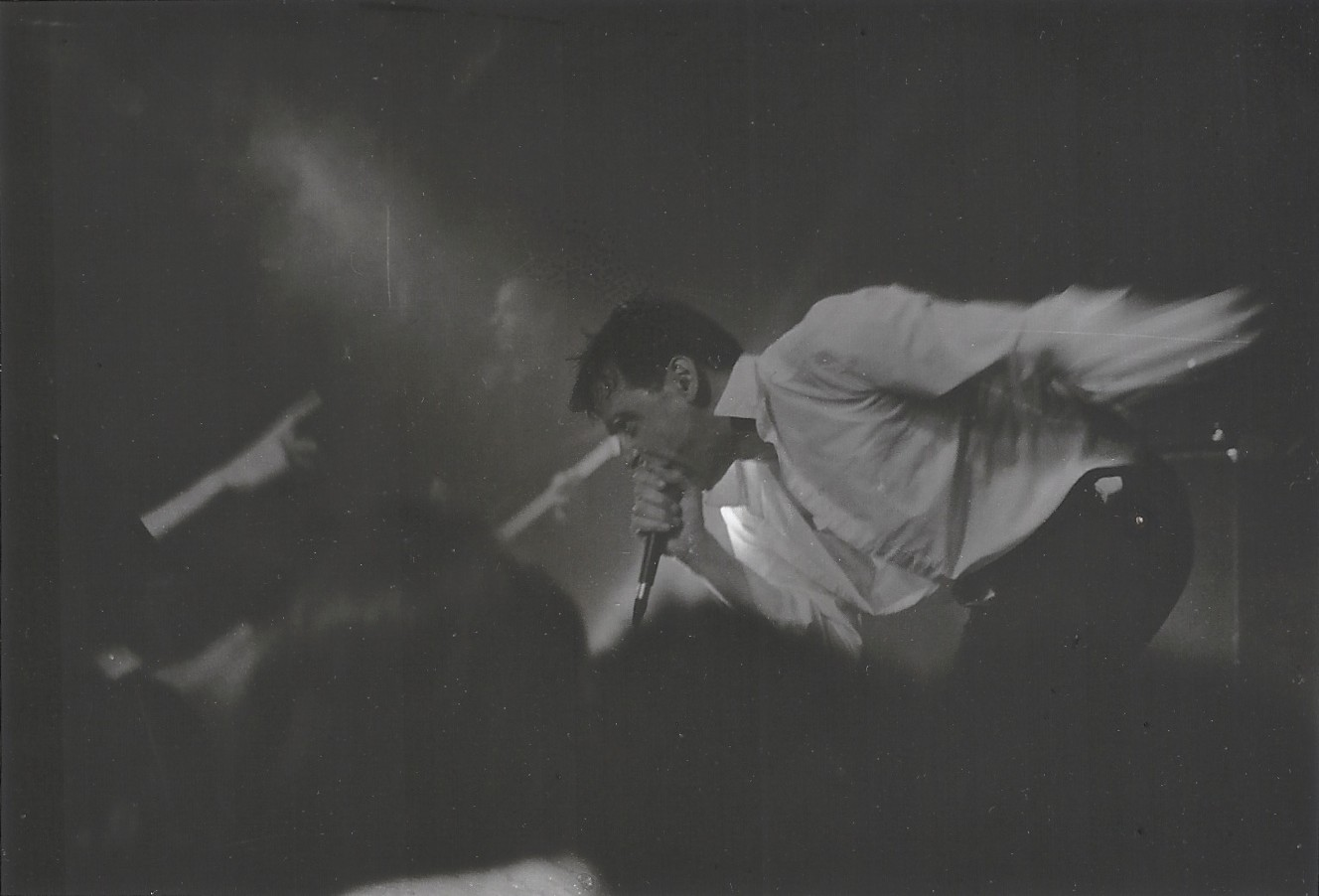
- God Bullies (1990)

Background information
- Origin: Kalamazoo, Michigan, United States
- Genre: Noise rock
- Years active: 1986–1995
- Labels: Amphetamine Reptile Records; Alternative Tentacles
- Members: Mike Hard; Andy “Bongo” Furda; Pat O’Harris; Cliff Carinci
- Past members: David B. Livingstone; Adam Berg; Tommy Shannon; Mike Corso; Tony Oliveri; Eric Polcyn; Scott Kodrik

God Bullies is an American noise rock band from Kalamazoo, Michigan. The God Bullies original lineup was Tommy Shannon guitar, Adam Berg drums, Mike Hard vocals, Mike Corso on bass. Additionally some members changed through time with the addition of David Livingstone also on guitar, Eric Polcyn took over bass for a short time and Adam Berg was briefly replaced with Tony Oliveri of Cows fame on drums. The band has had thirteen total members since its origin until present day with front man Mike Hard always at the helm. They were active from 1986 to 1995, and were on hiatus for a time. This line reunited in 2010 to coincide with the Amphetamine Reptile Records' 25th Anniversary concert. This 2010 tour was known as the "War On Peace" tour and featured members David B. Livingstone (lead guitar), Mike Hard (vocals), Mike Corso (bass) & Adam Berg (drums) with Johnnie Johnson on guitar. God Bullies have since reformed in 2024.

The setlists sprawled across the band's entire catalog and averaged 25–30 songs a night. Yourfleshmag.com's review of God Bullies performance at the AmRep 25th Anniversary Bash said : "There were two or three bands that day who generated plenty of talk and God Bullies were easily one of the three. Well deserved praise for a band that hasn't really been functioning full-time for a while."

Although God Bullies never found any mainstream success then, creepy anthems like "Let's Go To Hell", "Ordinary Man" and "Cemetery", paired with frontman Mike Hard's theatrical delivery and over-the-top stage antics, earned the band a large cult following. God Bullies toured extensively throughout the US and Europe with artists including Hole, Melvins, Helmet, Tar, Surgery, Cows and Helios Creed. The band released material with Alternative Tentacles and Sympathy For The Record Industry, but the bulk of their releases were with Minneapolis-based Amphetamine Reptile Records.

Soon after the 2010 AmRep 25th Reunion show the God Bullies called it quits. Mike Hard went on to perform in several bands, Thrall, Hand Over Head, BrainSaw. Most recently Mike Hard was working with David B. Livingston, Scott Kodrik, Cliff Carinci and on November 4, 2021 the band Pig Harvest was created. They did record but guitarist David B. Livingstone died in February 2023.

God Bullies have reformed as the new God Bullies with original frontman Mike Hard, Scott Kodrik and the members of the Detroit band Thrall. Hard has been performing with Thrall and releasing albums with Thrall the last thirty two years. God Bullies songs played often in their sets and members Kodrik and Johnson have also played several God Bullies shows side by side with David B Livingstone. The new line up is Mike Hard (vocals), Andy “Bongo” Furda (guitars), Pat O’Harris (bass) and Cliff Carinci (drums). God Bullies recorded a new album at Steve Albini's Electrical Audio in April 2024 shortly before Albini's unexpected death. This was released October 4, 2024 on Reptilian Records. The album is titled As Above So Below.

== Discography ==
Year	Title	Label	Format
1988	"All I Want Is My Mamma"	Mad Queen Records	7" Single
1988	"Fear and Pain"	Amphetamine Reptile	7" Single
1989	Plastic Eye Miracle	Amphetamine Reptile	Cassette [12" EP reissued in 1990]
1989	Mama Womb Womb	Amphetamine Reptile	12" LP
1990	"Join Satan's Army"	Amphetamine Reptile	2x7" Single
1990	Dog Show	Amphetamine Reptile	12" LP - CD
1991	War on Everybody	Amphetamine Reptile	12" LP - CD
1992	"How Low Can You Go?"	Sympathy for the Record Industry	7" Single
1992	"Tell Me"	Anti-$ocial Propaganda	7" Single
1994	Kill the King	Alternative Tentacles	12" LP - CD
1995	"Millennium"	Radial Records	7" Single
2024	As Above So Below	Reptillian Records	12" LP
