= Halo of Flies =

American noise rock band

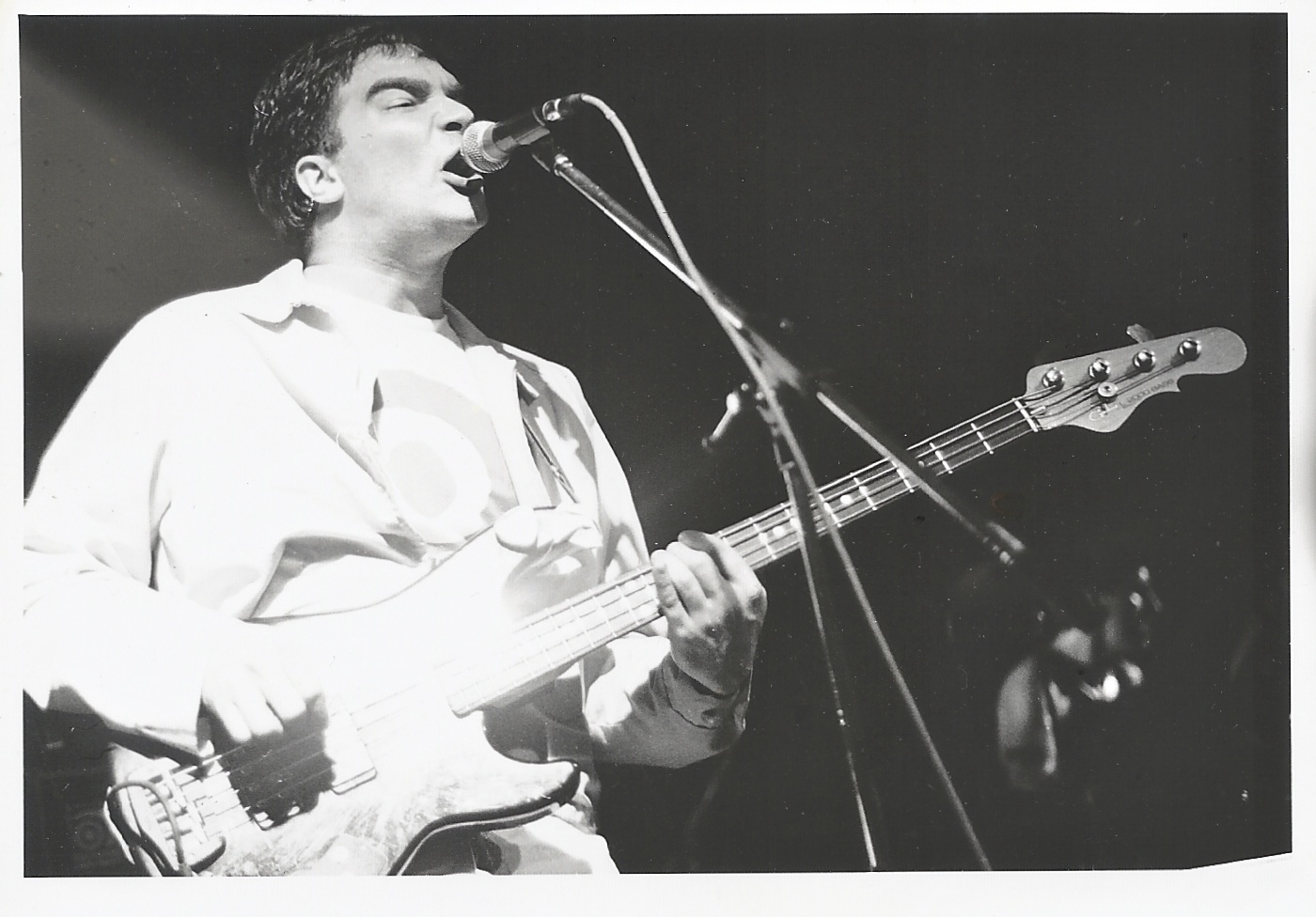
- Halo of Flies (1990)

Background information
- Also known as: H•O•F
- Origin: Minneapolis
- Genres: Noise rock
- Years active: 1986—1991, 2007—present
- Labels: Amphetamine Reptile, Twin/Tone
- Members: Tom Hazelmyer; John Anglim; Paddy Costello; Tim mac

Halo of Flies is an American noise rock band from Minneapolis. Named after an Alice Cooper song, Halo of Flies was formed in 1986 by Tom Hazelmyer, John Anglim and Tim Mac. Over the next five years they released a series of seven inch singles and mini LPs starting with a limited edition, hand numbered single called “Rubber Room”. These singles were released on Hazelmyer’s label Amphetamine Reptile Records and later compiled on a number of LPs, and eventually as the CD (Music for Insect Minds) in 1991. The band partially reformed in 2007 under the name H•O•F, and continued to release new material.

== Life of band ==
Sales of Halo of Flies records was assisted by a manufacturing/distribution deal with the popular Minnesota label Twin Tone records. Influenced by early punk bands MC5 and The Stooges, the band had a loud, raw sound that was heavily guitar influenced garage rock. Halo of Flies stopped recording in the early 1990s but Hazelmyer kept Amphetamine Reptile Records in business for 20 years by releasing music by Boss Hog, Helmet, The Melvins, Cows, God Bullies, Helios Creed and Unsane.

== Discography ==
As Halo of Flies

- Rubber Room 7-inch, 1986
- Snapping Black Roscoe Bottles 7-inch, 1986
- Circling the Pile 7-inch, 1987
- Richies Dog 7-inch, 1987
- Four from the Bottom cassette, 1988
- Garbage Rock! 12-inch, 1988
- Garbageburn 12-inch, 1988
- No Time 7-inch, 1988
- Death of a Fly 7-inch, 1989
- Singles Going Nowhere 12-inch, 1989
- Winged 7-inch, 1990
- Big Mod Hate Trip 7-inch, 1991
- Mod Showdown! 7-inch, 1991
- Music For Insect Minds, 1991 (compilation of all the previously released material)

As H•O•F

- split 7-inch with Wild Billy Childish and the Musicians of the British Empire, 2007
- A New Kind of Hate 7-inch, 2008
- When I'm Loaded 7-inch (with Lydia Lunch), 2008
- F.T.W. EP, 2008
- Gay Witch Abortion Sessions CD, 2009
- Resurrect a Bad Idea LP, 2010
