= Oar Folkjokeopus =

Record store in Minneapolis, Minnesota, US

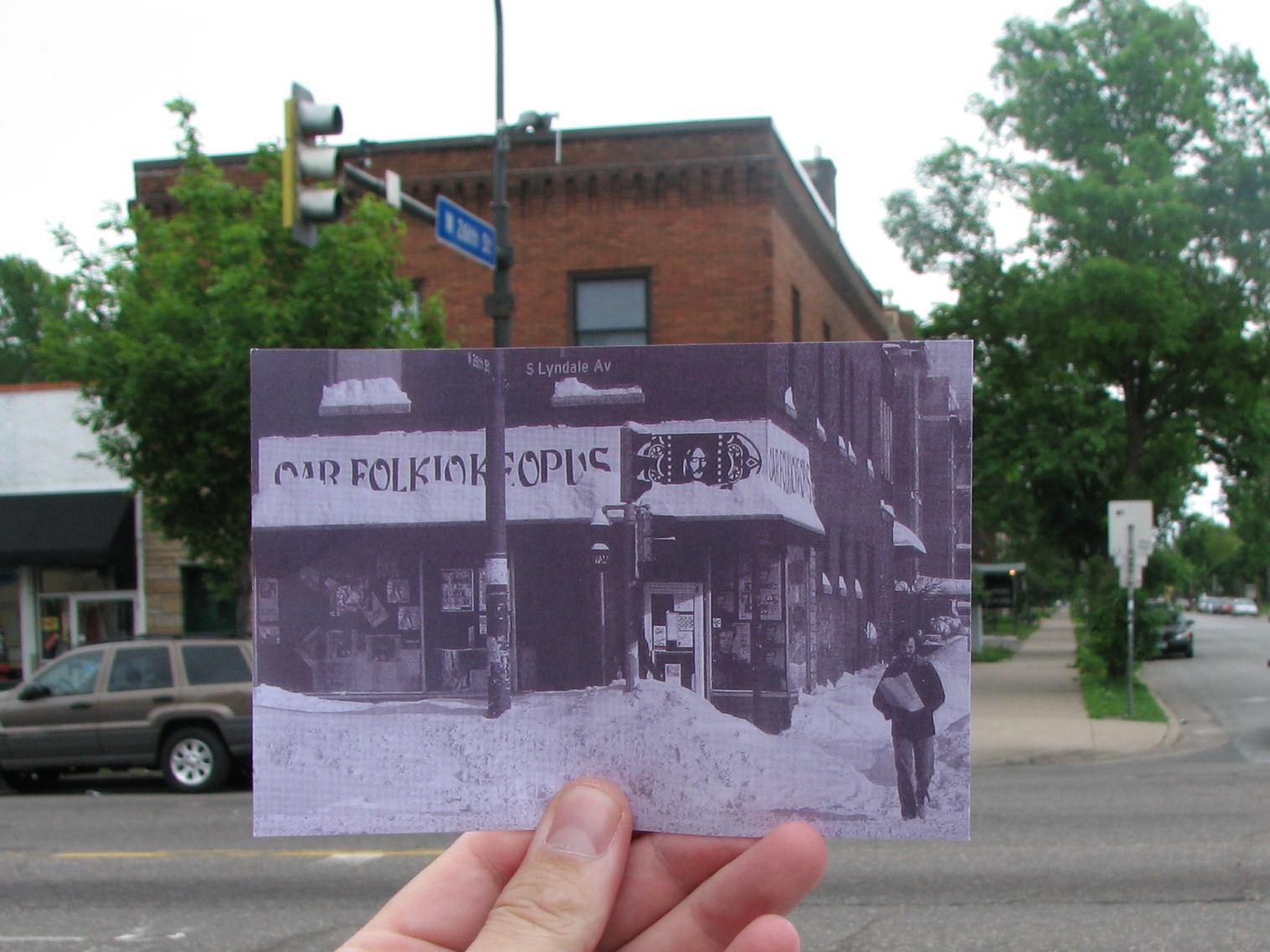
An image of the building at 26th Street South and Lyndale Avenue with a superimposed 1980s-era photo of Oar Folkjokeopus

Oar Folkjokeopus (commonly known as Oar Folk) was a Minneapolis record store that operated on the corner of Lyndale Ave and 26th St from 1973 until 2001. The store was considered one of the staples of the Minneapolis rock scene in the 1980s, along with Jay's Longhorn Bar, and became a popular hub for musicians in the Twin Cities and the Midwest. The store was one of the only stores in Minneapolis, along with Harpo's/Hot Licks and Northern Lights Music, that sold punk rock records in the 1970s and early 1980s, which made it a popular hangout for members of local bands such as Hüsker Dü, The Replacements, the Suicide Commandos, Soul Asylum and many more. Bob Mould of Hüsker Dü called it the city's "preeminent record store" and an important venue for him to find a fellow music-loving community.

Martin Keller, writer for the Minneapolis City Pages, said about Oar Folk: "A lot of people trace the whole rock scene (in the Twin Cities) to Oar Folk. I was living six blocks away at the time, and you'd always run into [Peter] Jesperson there because he worked the counter most days. [Bob] Mould was in and out on a regular basis. It was a real nice hangout." Lori Barbero, drummer for Babes in Toyland said concerning the store: "I have about 8,000 records, and I bought 7,000 of them at Oar Folk." Grant Hart of Hüsker Dü was not so fond of the store: "Oar Folk had a real snobbish attitude. It was a place to be condescended to."

== History ==
Vern Sanden purchased what was then North Country Music in 1973 and renamed it "Oar Folkjokeopus." (The name was based on the solo album Oar by Alexander "Skip" Spence, a founding member of Jefferson Airplane and Moby Grape and an album by British folk musician Roy Harper, Folkjokeopus.) Peter Jesperson managed the store from 1974 until 1982. Jesperson co-founded Twin/Tone Records during this time and the store as well as the label thrived due in large part to each other. Between Twin/Tone, local venue Jay's Longhorn Bar and Oar Folk, this trifecta largely fueled the punk and rock scene in Minneapolis during that era. Bands such as The Replacements, The Suburbs, Flamin' Oh's, Hüsker Dü, Soul Asylum, Jayhawks, and Curtiss A all maintained links between the three.

In 1985, a fire gutted Oar Folk. Vern Sanden reopened the record store with the help of Bill Melton and Mark Trehus, who ran his own indie record label, Treehouse Records.

== Treehouse Records ==
After Oar Folkjokeopus closed in April 2001, Mark Trehus opened a store at the same site known as Treehouse Records. Much of the original store's character remained. Treehouse specialized in vinyl LPs, vinyl 45s, and both new and used CDs. Treehouse closed on December 31, 2017.

== Lucky Cat Records ==
After Treehouse Records closed, the building sat vacant for several years until the space was rented by Michele Swanson and was converted into Lucky Cat records in 2024.
