= Thor Eisentrager =

American musician

- Born: February 1958 (age 68)
- Genres: Noise rock, punk blues
- Occupation: Musician
- Instrument: Guitar
- Years active: 1986–98
- Labels: Treehouse Records, Amphetamine Reptile
- Formerly of: Cows

Thor Eisentrager is a founding member and former guitarist for the Minneapolis-based Noise rock-outfit, the Cows. After the release of the Cows's ninth album, Sorry in Pig Minor, Thor announced that he had grown tired of touring and left the band. The remaining members disbanded shortly thereafter. After retiring from the music business, he worked as the assistant director of security for the Minneapolis Institute of Art. He left in 2019 after several years of working there. He now works as the Manager of Public Safety at St Catherine University.

== Musical style and influence ==
His approach to guitar playing has been noted as adding to the band's diverse sound. His style was also described as sounding as if he "played with metal files." Unlike the other members of the Cows, Thor was mostly influenced by the Blues, favoring such artists as Muddy Waters and The Rolling Stones. He was also known to bring hand-written notation into band practice.
