= Shannon Selberg =

American musician

- Born: Shannon Scott Selberg; June 3, 1960 (age 66); Minneapolis, Minnesota, United States
- Genres: Noise rock, punk blues
- Occupation: Musician
- Instruments: Vocals, bugle, keyboards
- Years active: 1987–present
- Labels: Amphetamine Reptile, Rubric, Treehouse

Shannon Scott Selberg (born June 3, 1960) is a noise/punk rock musician known for his unusual antics on stage. Formerly the frontman for the Minneapolis-based group The Cows, Selberg provided lead vocals, trumpet, bugle and hardcore guitar. After the dissolution of The Cows in 1998, Selberg, described by Pitchfork Media as "the Crispin Glover of the noise rock community", moved on to New York City noise-rock band, The Heroine Sheiks, where he has added keyboards to his repertoire.

== Performance persona ==
In its biography of Cows, Allmusic credits Selberg's "squealing, shrieking, and general lunacy" as "the bizarre, often engaging, focus" of the band. He is known for his "legendary" antics on stage, described by the Detroit Metro Times as a "demented roadside attraction". His onstage behavior has included performing naked except for strategically placed shaving cream, performing with mousetraps "dangling from his ears", wearing a business suit with stuffed animals at the crotch and a skin suit made from a love doll. In a 1992 review, The New York Times assessed Selberg's stage wear as a visual counterpart to the music of his then band, Cows, "merging defiance, pain and dark comedy". Selberg's general presentation with Cows was described as a mingling of "requisite menace and a disarmingly arch, lowbrow wit..., leveling both barrels at the oozing backalley/trailerpark underbelly of life."
