= Tom Hazelmyer =

American musician and printmaker (born 1965)

- Born: 1965 (age 60–61); Michigan, U.S.
- Genre: Noise rock
- Occupations: Record executive, musician
- Instruments: Vocals, guitar
- Years active: 1983–present
- Label: Amphetamine Reptile

Tom Hazelmyer (born 1965) is an American musician and printmaker. He is known as the founder and owner of the independent label Amphetamine Reptile Records as well as being the lead vocalist and songwriter for the band Halo of Flies.

== Biography ==
Tom Hazelmyer was born and raised in Michigan before moving with his family to Minneapolis in 1980 when he was fourteen. During his youth, Hazelmyer worked in a foundry and performed in several punk rock bands during his free time. In 1983, after becoming disenchanted with the underground punk scene, he opted to enlist in the Marines and was eventually stationed near Seattle, Washington. It was there he established his own record label Amphetamine Reptile with the intention of issuing albums by his band Halo of Flies, who had already been turned down by several recording labels.
