= Amphetamine Reptile Records =

American record label

- Founded: 1986
- Founder: Tom Hazelmyer
- Distributor: Twin/Tone Records
- Genre: Noise rock
- Country of origin: U.S.
- Location: Minneapolis, Minnesota
- Official website: shoxop.com

Amphetamine Reptile Records (or AmRep Industries) is a record label founded in 1986 by Tom Hazelmyer in Washington state. The label specializes in noise rock and also released Strap It On, the debut album by alternative metal band Helmet which sold more than 40,000 records. According to Hazelmyer, the success of the album was vital to keeping AmRep going throughout the 1990s, as it "helped support the other things that sold less." The label was the subject of the 2015 documentary The Color of Noise.

== History ==
Hazelmyer originally started the label to release records by his band, Halo of Flies. Eventually the label's roster expanded to include releases by Helmet, Melvins, Cows, Helios Creed, Chokebore, Servotron and others. Hazelmyer later moved the label to Minneapolis. Today the label is used by the Melvins, H•O•F and other legacy AmRep acts to release limited edition vinyl. These releases are generally noted for their Linocut artwork, hand carved by Hazelmyer, their limited availability and their highly sought after nature as collector's items.

Much of the AmRep back catalog is now out of print, although many of the releases are available in digital download format and streaming.

On May 13, 2020 Tom Hazelmyer participated in an in-depth interview about the label on Conan Neutron's Protonic Reversal.

== Artists ==
- Bailter Space
- Boredoms
- Boss Hog
- Brainiac
- Calvin Krime
- Chokebore
- Cosmic Psychos
- Cows
- Dwarves
- feedtime
- Freedom Fighters
- Gas Huffer
- Gaunt
- God Bullies
- godheadSilo
- Halo of Flies/H•O•F
- Hammerhead
- Helios Creed
- Helmet
- The Heroine Sheiks
- Janitor Joe
- Jawbox
- Killdozer
- King Snake Roost
- lowercase
- Lubricated Goat
- Melvins
- mr.phylzzz
- Mudhoney
- Nashville Pussy
- Negative Approach
- Servotron
- Steel Pole Bath Tub
- Strapping Fieldhands
- Surgery
- Superchunk
- Supernova
- Tad
- Tar
- The Jesus Lizard
- Thee Headcoats
- Thee Mighty Caesars
- The Thrown Ups
- The U-Men
- The Urinals
- Today is the Day
- Unsane
- Vertigo
- X

== Notable performances ==
- Cosmic Psychos / Hammerhead / Surgery / Cows / Melvins / Helmet - the CMJ / Amphetamine Reptile Tour - Friday, October 30, 1992, at The Ritz

== See also ==
- List of record labels
