= Lori Black =

American bassist (born 1954)

- Born: April 9, 1954 (age 72); Santa Monica, California, U.S.
- Other name: Lorax
- Occupation: Bassist
- Parent(s): Shirley Temple (mother); Charles Alden Black (father)

Lori Black (born April 9, 1954), also known as Lorax, is an American musician born in Santa Monica, California. She played bass for Clown Alley and for the sludge metal band Melvins.

She is the second child of Shirley Temple, the popular 1930s child actress who became a diplomat in adulthood, and businessman Charles Alden Black. In 1987, Black was briefly married to musician Buzz Osborne.

== Early life ==
Lori Black was born on April 9, 1954, at Santa Monica Hospital in Santa Monica, California. She has a half sister, Susan, and a brother, Charles Alden Black Jr.

== Melvins ==
With grunge pioneers Melvins on hiatus since late 1987, bassist Matt Lukin left the band to form Mudhoney. The Melvins replaced him with Lori Black. At the time, Melvins frontman Buzz Osborne was dating Black, and the idea developed to have her play bass for the band. The first recording to feature Black's work was 1989's Ozma. Black is also credited with playing on the band's major label debut Houdini in 1993, though Osborne has said Black did not play on it. She was supporting their live performances as late as March 1993.

== Discography ==
=== with Melvins ===
- Ozma (1989)
- Your Choice Live 012 (1991)
- Bullhead (1991)
- Here She Comes Now/Venus in Furs (1991, Split with Nirvana)
- Eggnog (1991)
- Singles 1–12 (Tracks "Theme" and "Way of the World", released 1996–1997)
- Neither Here nor There (Tracks 3, 8 & 12, released 2004)
- Pick Your Battles (Tracks 1–8, recorded circa 1989, released 2009)

=== with Clown Alley ===
- Circus of Chaos (1985)
