= Clown Alley (band) =

American Band

Clown Alley was a 1980s San Francisco Bay area punk rock band.

== Band members ==
- David Duran – vocals
- Mark Deutrom – guitar
- Lori Black – bass
- Justin Clayton – drums

Deutrom and Black (who is the daughter of Shirley Temple Black) eventually joined the Melvins.

== Discography ==
- Clown Alley (1985, demo)
- Circus of Chaos (1986, Alchemy Records, VM101)
