= Bullhead (album) =

Studio album by Melvins
- Released: January 28, 1991
- Recorded: 1990
- Genres: Sludge metal; stoner metal; grunge
- Length: 34:52
- Label: Boner
- Producer: Jonathan Burnside

Melvins chronology
Your Choice Live Series Vol. 12 (1991)	Bullhead (1991)	Eggnog (1991)

Singles from Bullhead
- 1. "Your Blessened" Released: 1990

Bullhead is the third studio album by the American rock band Melvins, released in 1991 through Boner Records.

== Release ==
Bullhead was originally released in 1991 on vinyl, CD and cassette. Boner Records re-released it on vinyl in 2015, paired with the previous album Ozma.

== Reception and legacy ==
Professional ratings
Review scores
Source	Rating
AllMusic	4/5 stars

The Japanese experimental band Boris took their name from Bullhead's first track.

The Richmond Times-Dispatch wrote that "the spare, chugging intensity of this three-piece Seattle noise unit continues to amaze."

In 2017, Rolling Stone listed the album at No. 60 on their list of "100 Greatest Metal Albums of All Time". They felt that it announced the Melvins as a metal band, citing lengthier songs, a more precise feel and "not so fried" production as reasons. The magazine also felt "Your Blessened"'s "optimistic churn" set the way for future metal bands Baroness and Torche.

== Track listing ==
All tracks are written by Buzz Osborne.

No.	Title	Length
1.	"Boris"	8:34
2.	"Anaconda"	2:23
3.	"Ligature"	3:49
4.	"It's Shoved"	2:35
5.	"Zodiac"	4:14
6.	"If I Had an Exorcism"	3:07
7.	"Your Blessened"	5:39
8.	"Cow"	4:31
Total length:		34:52

== Personnel ==
Melvins

- Buzz Osborne – guitars, vocals
- Lori Black – bass
- Dale Crover – drums

Technical

- Jonathan Burnside – production, engineering
