= Sandy Descher =

American actress (born 1945)

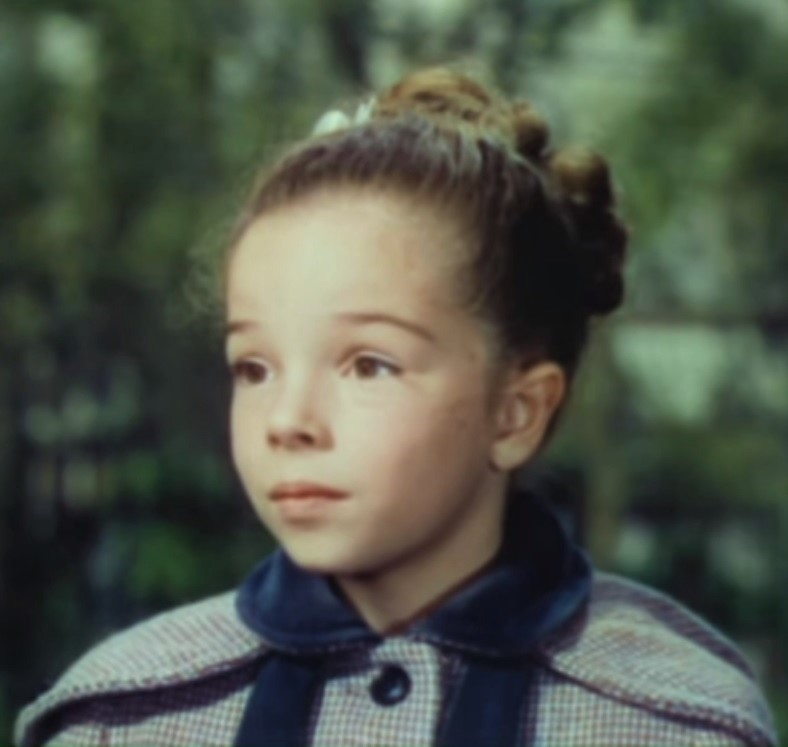
- Descher in The Last Time I Saw Paris (1954)
- Born: November 30, 1945 (age 80); Burbank, California, U.S.
- Occupation: Actress
- Years active: 1952–1966
- Spouse: Donald White (m. 1965; div. 1977)
- Children: 2

Sandy Descher (born November 30, 1945) is an American former child actress.

== Life and career ==
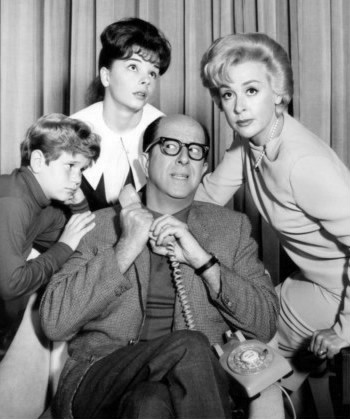
Ronnie Dapo, Descher, Elena Verdugo and Phil Silvers in a publicity photo from The New Phil Silvers Show (1964).

Born November 30, 1945, in Burbank, California, Descher is the daughter of Mr. and Mrs. Fred Descher. She has a younger brother, Michael. She attended North Hollywood High School.

In 1954, a news item reported that Descher was "the only long-term contract child in Hollywood," having been signed by Metro-Goldwyn-Mayer.

That same year, she appeared in her favorite film, The Last Time I Saw Paris in which she plays Vicky. The film is based on F. Scott Fitzgerald's short story Babylon Revisited, and stars Van Johnson and Elizabeth Taylor, who play her parents. The movie called on her to speak French and to dance ballet.

Also in 1954, she played a disabled child in the Martin and Lewis film 3 Ring Circus. The same year she played the little girl traumatized by giant ants in the science fiction movie Them!. In 1955, she was in The Prodigal with Lana Turner. Then she played Gregory Peck's 10-year-old daughter in The Man in the Gray Flannel Suit.

Descher also played Susan Walker, daughter of Doris Walker (Teresa Wright) in the 1955 holiday special version of Miracle on 34th Street.

In 1956, she played Debbie in The Opposite Sex, a musical remake of The Women (1939). She appeared in another movie with Van Johnson that year, The Bottom of the Bottle (1956). She also guest-starred in The Adventures of Ozzie and Harriet as the title character of the 1965 TV episode titled "Kris' Girlfriend", in which she played Sally. Around this time, she guest-starred with Ann Doran in the Western series My Friend Flicka, and on the Cold War drama series, Crusader. She guest-starred as the daughter of a sea captain in an episode of Wagon Train.

Her last movie, at the age of 12, was the cult favorite The Space Children (1958). In 1959, she appeared in the episode "Dark Morning" of CBS's anthology series, The DuPont Show with June Allyson. She guest-starred on The Real McCoys. In 1961, she appeared in the first season of My Three Sons, as Elizabeth Martin, a love interest for Robbie Douglas (Don Grady) in episode 32, "The Musician", and in 1964 again as Robbie's love interest in season five as Marjorie in episode 13 "You're in My Power".

Descher also appeared in a recurring role as Judy Massey, a daughter of the Loretta Young character, Christine Massey, in the CBS family drama, The New Loretta Young Show (1962–63). She played Susanna in The Donna Reed Show, and Susan, the daughter of Elena Verdugo's character of Audrey, in 1964 in CBS's sitcom The New Phil Silvers Show. Her final television role was in 1966 when she appeared on Perry Mason as Sherry Lawler in "The Case of the Avenging Angel".
