= Babylon Revisited and Other Stories =

Short stories by F. Scott Fitzgerald

First edition

Babylon Revisited and Other Stories is a collection of ten short stories written between 1920 and 1937 by F. Scott Fitzgerald. It was published in 1960 by Charles Scribner's Sons.

== Selection ==
Babylon Revisited collects ten of F. Scott Fitzgerald's best-known short stories. In an afterword to the 1996 edition, Fitzgerald scholar Matthew Bruccoli describes the period leading up to the selection, "F. Scott Fitzgerald died believing himself a failure. The obituaries were condescending, and he seemed destined for literary obscurity. The first phase of the Fitzgerald resurrection—'revival' does not properly describe the process—occurred between 1945 and 1950. By 1960 he had achieved a secure place among America's enduring writers." In an afterword to the 2000 edition, James L. W. West III of Pennsylvania State University explains of the Babylon Revisited stories, "His writings embody lessons of ambition and disappointment, idealism and disenchantment, success and failure and redemption, that are central to the American experience...His romantic readiness for life and his gift for hope have come to embody important aspects of the American experience."

== Contents ==
The ten stories included are

1. "The Ice Palace"
2. "May Day"
3. "The Diamond as Big as the Ritz"
4. "Winter Dreams"
5. "Absolution"
6. "The Rich Boy"
7. "The Freshest Boy"
8. "Babylon Revisited"
9. "Crazy Sunday"
10. "The Long Way Out"

== Reception ==
When the title story appeared in Fitzgerald's final collection, 1935's Taps at Reveille, The New York Times wrote "'Babylon Revisited', which seems oddly linked in spirit to Mr. Fitzgerald's latest novel, Tender is the Night, is probably the most mature and substantial story in the book. A rueful, though incompleted, farewell to the Jazz Age, its setting is Paris and its tone one of anguish for past follies." In a January 2011 essay to commemorate the 50th anniversary of the Penguin's Modern Classics series, University of East Anglia's Sarah Churchwell wrote

"Babylon Revisited" is at once timeless and startlingly modern in its evocation of a single father struggling with alcoholism and trying to care for his daughter, and coming to terms with the costs of extravagance...Nine years after the publication, less than a year before he would die at 44, Fitzgerald wrote his daughter Scottie a letter about the story: "You have earned some money for me this week because I sold 'Babylon Revisited', in which you are a character, to the pictures (the sum received wasn’t worthy of the magnificent story—neither of you nor of me—however, I am accepting it)." Like [the story's hero], Fitzgerald learnt the hard way that loss is remorseless, absolute; what has been wasted is irrecoverable. But as "Babylon Revisited" also shows, even out of the wreckage some things can be salvaged, if not everything: what Fitzgerald retrieved he bequeathed to us, the hard-won lessons of his life transformed into heartbreaking art.

Churchwell called the story—as of 2011—"a perfect tale for the times we live in".
