= First Blood (short story) =

Short story by F. Scott Fitzgerald

- Short story by F. Scott Fitzgerald
- Country: United States
- Language: English
- Genre: Short story

Publication
- Published in: The Saturday Evening Post
- Publication type: Magazine
- Publisher: Curtis Publishing Company
- Media type: Print
- Publication date: April 5, 1930

"First Blood" is a short story by American writer F. Scott Fitzgerald, originally published in the April 5, 1930 issue of The Saturday Evening Post and illustrated by Harry Russell Ballinger. The story centers on teenage rebellion by Josephine Perry, a wealthy Chicago socialite. It is the first of the five-part "Josephine Perry" stories. Scribner's included the work in his 1935 short story collection Taps at Reveille.

== Plot summary ==
Josephine Perry, a young Chicago socialite, joins her friend on a trip to visit their boyfriends under the guise of seeing a movie. Her love interest, Travis de Coppet, hails from another young White Anglo-Saxon Protestant family. Over the course of the evening, Travis makes advances toward Josephine, but she rejects him.

Josephine delights in the power she holds over men. Beautiful yet jealous, she laments that a man she desires spends time with another girl, even as she refuses to return another suitor's feelings due to her emotional immaturity.

== History ==
Written in January 1930, the story was published while Zelda Fitzgerald's mental health palpably declined. Fitzgerald began using the profits from his short stories to pay her medical bills. The story's publication coincided with her hospitalization. The title may refer to the breaking of a girl's hymen.
