= Circus of Chaos =

Studio album by Clown Alley
- Released: 1985
- Genres: Crossover thrash, punk rock
- Labels: Alchemy Records (VM101); Southern Lord Records (SUNN63)

Professional ratings
Review scores
Source	Rating
Allmusic	4.5/5 stars
Crash	3–4/6

Circus of Chaos is the only Studio album by Clown Alley, released in 1985 through Alchemy Records (VM101). It was re-released by Southern Lord Records in 2006.

Band members Mark Deutrom and Lori Black both went on to become members of seminal grunge band Melvins, though at different times.

== Track listing ==
1. "The Lie"
2. "Unplugged"
3. "In the Cartoon"
4. "On the Way Up"
5. "Uranium Miner's Daughter"
6. "Pet of a Pig"
7. "The Grey Men"
8. "Envy"
9. "Theme"
10. "The Second Day"
11. "The Prey"

== Personnel ==
- David Duran - vocals
- Mark Deutrom - guitar
- Lori Black - bass guitar
- Justin Clayton - drums
