= Shirley Temple =

American actress and diplomat (1928–2014)

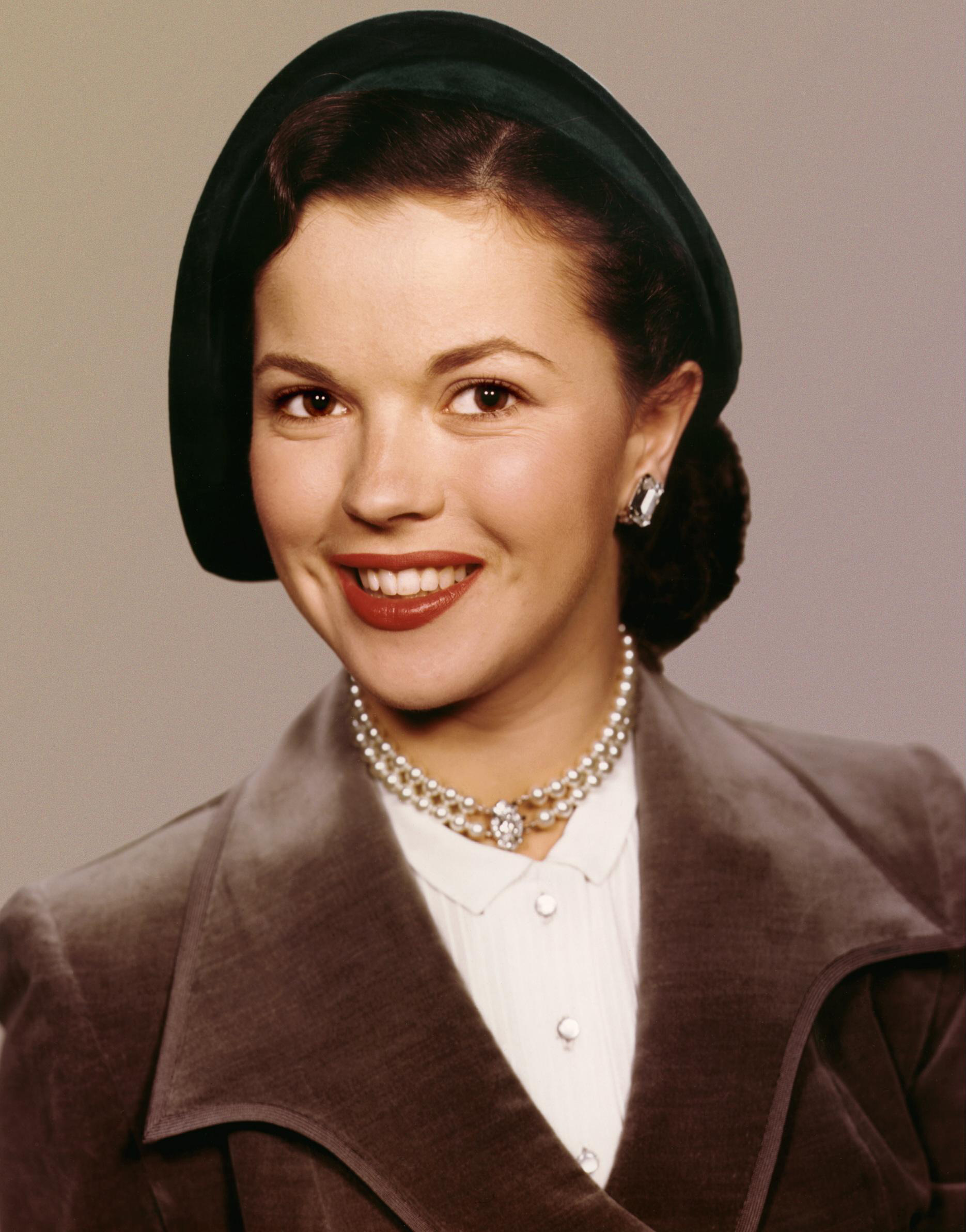
- Temple in 1948

United States Ambassador to Czechoslovakia
- In office August 23, 1989 – July 12, 1992
- President: George H. W. Bush
- Preceded by: Julian Niemczyk
- Succeeded by: Adrian A. Basora

Chief of Protocol of the United States
- In office July 1, 1976 – January 21, 1977
- President: Gerald Ford; Jimmy Carter
- Preceded by: Henry E. Catto Jr.
- Succeeded by: Evan Dobelle

United States Ambassador to Ghana
- In office December 6, 1974 – July 13, 1976
- President: Gerald Ford
- Preceded by: Fred L. Hadsel
- Succeeded by: Robert P. Smith

President of the Commonwealth Club of California
- In office February 1984 – August 1984

Personal details
- Born: Shirley Jane Temple; April 23, 1928 Santa Monica, California, U.S.
- Died: February 10, 2014 (aged 85) Woodside, California, U.S.
- Resting place: Alta Mesa Memorial Park
- Party: Republican
- Spouses: John Agar (m. 1945; div. 1950) Charles Alden Black (m. 1950; died 2005)
- Children: 3, including Lori
- Occupation: Actress; singer; dancer; politician; diplomat
- Website: shirleytemple.com
- Years active: 1932–1965 (entertainer); 1967–1992 (public servant)

Shirley Jane Temple Black (née Temple; April 23, 1928 – February 10, 2014) was an American actress, singer, dancer, politician, and diplomat, who was Hollywood's number-one box-office draw as a child actress from 1934 to 1938. Later, she was named United States Ambassador to Ghana and to Czechoslovakia, and also served as Chief of Protocol of the United States.

Temple began her film career in 1931 when she was three years old and became well known for her performance in Bright Eyes, released in 1934. She won a special Juvenile Academy Award in February 1935 for her outstanding contribution as a juvenile performer in motion pictures during 1934 and continued to appear in popular films through the remainder of the 1930s, although her subsequent films became less popular as she grew older. She appeared in her last film, A Kiss for Corliss, in 1949.

Temple joined the Junior League of Palo Alto, California, in 1959 and shortly thereafter began a new chapter of public service, perhaps using a combination of her stardom and her leadership training to advocate for important causes.

She began her diplomatic career in 1969, when she was appointed to represent the U.S. at a session of the United Nations General Assembly, where she worked at the U.S. Mission under Ambassador Charles Yost. Later, she was named U.S. ambassador to Ghana, and also served as the first female U.S. chief of protocol. In 1988, she published her autobiography, Child Star. After her biography was published, she served as the penultimate U.S. ambassador to Czechoslovakia (1989–1992).

Temple was the recipient of numerous awards and honors, including the Kennedy Center Honors and a Screen Actors Guild Life Achievement Award. In 1999, Temple is 18th on the American Film Institute's list of the greatest female American screen legends of classic Hollywood cinema.

== Early years ==
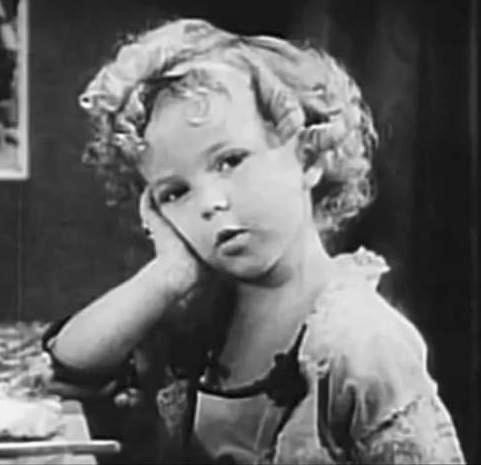
Temple in Glad Rags to Riches (1933)

Shirley Jane Temple was born on April 23, 1928, at Santa Monica Hospital in Santa Monica, California, the third child of homemaker Gertrude Amelia Temple (née Krieger (Note: The Kriegers altered the spelling of their surname to the French-sounding "Crieger" for a time due to rising anti-German sentiment during World War I.)) and bank employee George Francis Temple. The family was of Dutch, English, and German ancestry. She had two brothers: John and George Jr. The family moved to Rockingham Avenue, Brentwood, Los Angeles.

Temple's mother encouraged her to develop her singing, dancing, and acting talents. At about this time, her mother began styling Temple's hair in ringlets.

While at the dance school, Temple was spotted by Charles Lamont, who was a casting director for Educational Pictures. She hid behind a piano while he was in the studio. Lamont liked Temple and invited her to audition. He signed her to a contract in 1932. Educational Pictures launched its Baby Burlesks, 10-minute comedy shorts satirizing recent films and events, using preschool children in every role. In 1933, Temple appeared in Glad Rags to Riches, a parody of the Mae West feature She Done Him Wrong, with Temple as a saloon singer. That same year, she appeared in Kid 'in' Africa as a child imperiled in the jungle and in Runt Page, a pastiche of the previous year's The Front Page. The younger players in the cast recited their lines phonetically.

Temple became the breakout star of this series, and Educational promoted her to 20-minute comedies in the Frolics of Youth series with Frank Coghlan Jr. Temple played Mary Lou Rogers, the baby sister in a contemporary suburban family. Temple and her child costars modeled for breakfast cereals and other products to fund production costs. She was lent to Tower Productions for a small role in the studio's first feature film, The Red-Haired Alibi (1932), and in 1933 to Universal, Paramount and Warner Bros. Pictures for various parts, including an uncredited role in To the Last Man (1933), starring Randolph Scott and Esther Ralston.

== Film career ==
After viewing one of Temple's Frolics of Youth films, Fox Film Corporation songwriter Jay Gorney saw her dancing in the theater lobby. Recognizing her from the screen, Gorney arranged a screen test for Temple for the film Stand Up and Cheer! (1934). Temple auditioned on December 7, 1933, and won the part. She was signed to a $150-per-week contract that was guaranteed for two weeks by Fox. The role was a breakthrough performance for Temple. Her charm was evident to Fox executives, and she was ushered into corporate offices almost immediately after finishing "Baby, Take a Bow", a song-and-dance number that she performed with James Dunn.

=== Roles ===
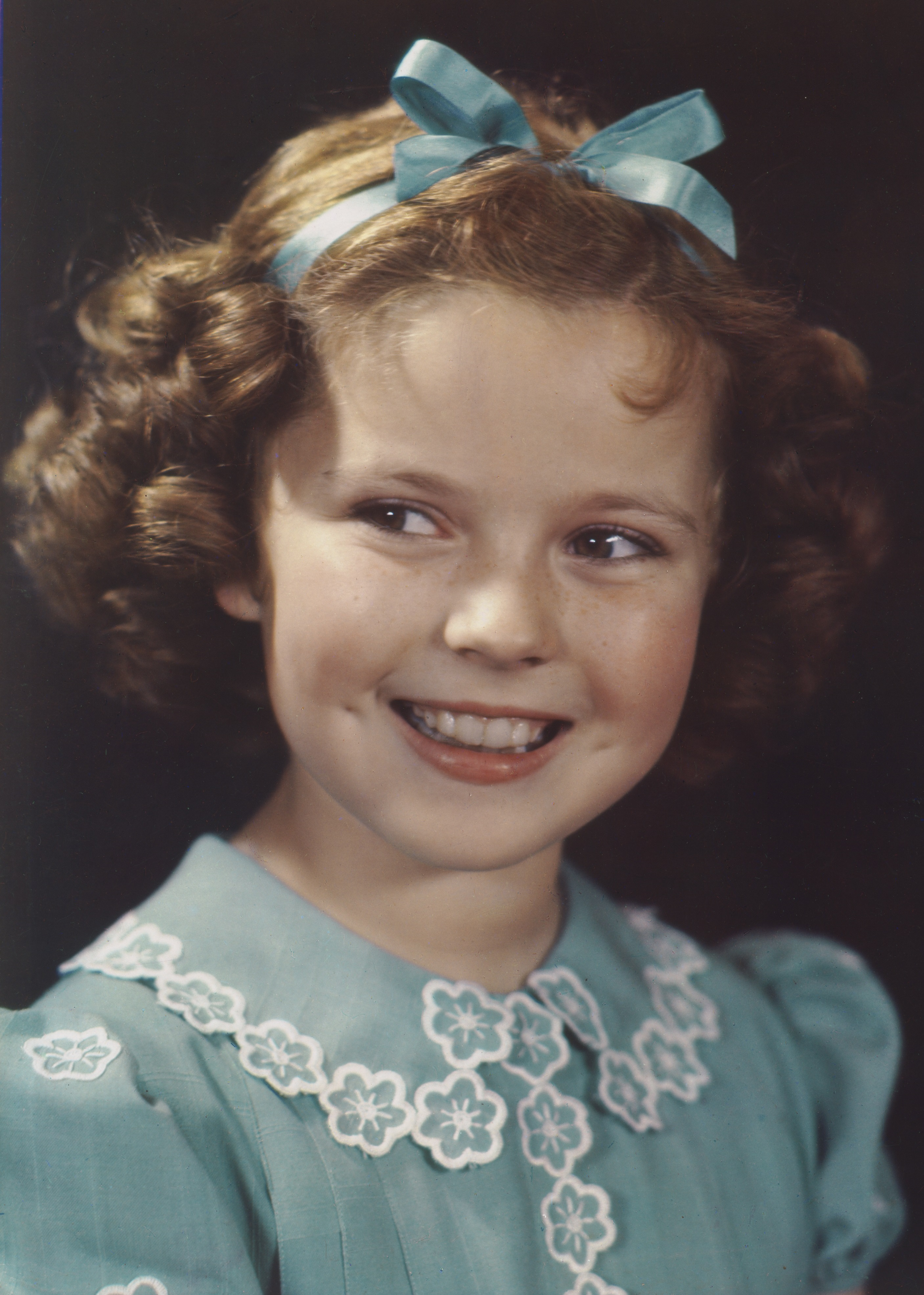
Temple in 1938

Biographer John Kasson argues:

In almost all of these films, she played the role of emotional healer, mending rifts between erstwhile sweethearts, estranged family members, traditional and modern ways, and warring armies. Characteristically lacking one or both parents, she constituted new families of those most worthy to love and protect her. Producers delighted in contrasting her diminutive stature, sparkling eyes, dimpled smile, and 56 blond curls by casting her opposite strapping leading men, such as Gary Cooper, John Boles, Victor McLaglen, and Randolph Scott. Yet her favorite costar was the great African American tap dancer Bill "Bojangles" Robinson, with whom she appeared in four films, beginning with The Little Colonel (1935), in which they performed the famous staircase dance.

Biographer Anne Edwards wrote about the tone and tenor of Temple's films:

This was mid-Depression, and schemes proliferated for the care of the needy and the regeneration of the fallen. But they all required endless paperwork and demeaning, hours-long queues, at the end of which an exhausted, nettled social worker dealt with each person as a faceless number. Shirley offered a natural solution: to open one's heart.

President Franklin D. Roosevelt praised her performances, saying, "It is a splendid thing that for just 15 cents, an American can go to a movie and look at the smiling face of a baby and forget his troubles."

=== Finances ===
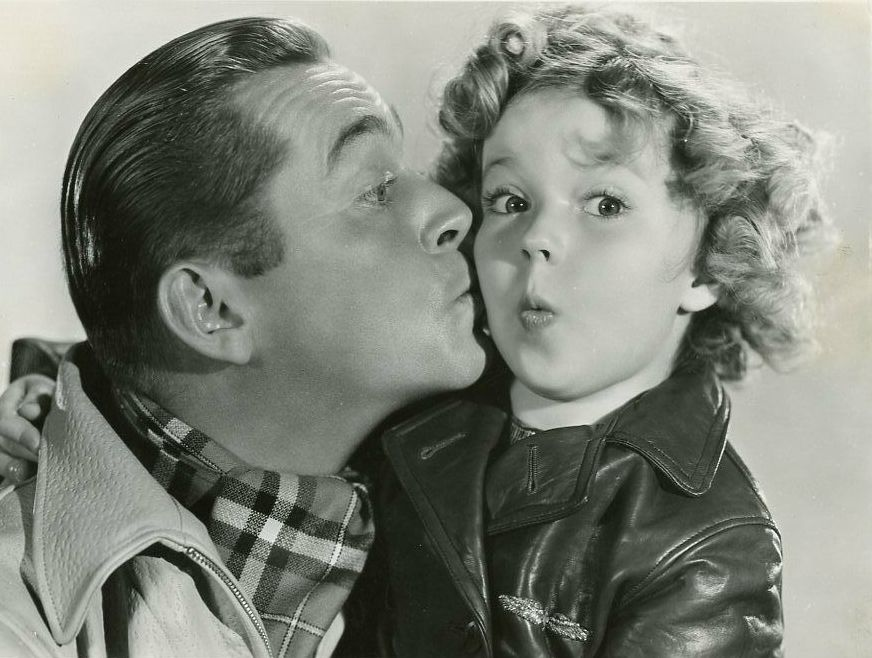
Publicity photo of Temple and James Dunn in Bright Eyes (1934)

On December 21, 1933, Temple's contract was extended to one year at the same $150 per week (equivalent to $3,731 in 2025) with a seven-year option, and her mother Gertrude was hired at $25 per week (equivalent to $622 in 2025) as her hairdresser and personal coach. Released in May 1934, Stand Up and Cheer! became Shirley's breakthrough film. She performed in a short skit in the film alongside popular Fox star James Dunn, singing and tap dancing. Fox executives rushed her into another film with Dunn, Baby Take a Bow (named after their song in Stand Up and Cheer!). Temple's third film, also with Dunn, was Bright Eyes (1934), a movie written specifically for her.

After the success of her first three films, Temple's parents realized that she was not being paid sufficiently. Her image also began to appear on numerous commercial products without her legal authorization and without compensation. To regain control over the use of her image and to negotiate with Fox, Temple's parents hired lawyer Loyd Wright to represent them. On July 18, 1934, Temple's contractual salary was raised to $1,000 per week (equivalent to $24,067 in 2025), and her mother's salary was raised to $250 per week (equivalent to $6,017 in 2025), with an additional $15,000 (equivalent to $361,007 in 2025) bonus for each finished film. Cease-and-desist letters were sent to many companies and authorized corporate licenses began to be issued.

Bright Eyes, written with her acting style in mind, was released in 1934 The film included the song "On the Good Ship Lollipop", which is considered to be her signature song. She was awarded a miniature Juvenile Oscar in 1935.

=== 1935–1937 ===
Temple's quota of films in each calendar year was increased from three to four in the contract that her parents signed in July 1934. Now and Forever starring Gary Cooper and Carole Lombard (with Temple billed third with her name above the title beneath Cooper's and Lombard's), The Little Colonel, Our Little Girl, Curly Top (with the signature song "Animal Crackers in My Soup") and The Littlest Rebel were released after the contract was signed. Curly Top was Temple's last film before the merger between 20th Century Pictures and the Fox Film Corporation.

Temple's salary was $2,500 per week (equivalent to $58,708 in 2025) by the end of 1935. Elaborate sets were built for the production at the famed Iverson Movie Ranch in Chatsworth, where a rock feature at the heavily filmed location ranch was eventually named Shirley Temple Rock.

Heidi was the only other Temple film released in 1937. Midway through shooting of the movie, the dream sequence was added to the script. Temple herself reportedly was behind the dream sequence and she had enthusiastically pushed for it, but in her autobiography, she vehemently denied this. Her contract gave neither her parents nor her any creative control over her movies. She saw this as Zanuck's refusal to make any serious attempt at building upon the success of her dramatic role in Wee Willie Winkie.

One of the many examples of how Temple was permeating popular culture at the time is the references to her in the 1937 film Stand-In; newly minted film studio honcho Atterbury Dodd (played by Leslie Howard) has never heard of Temple, much to the shock and disbelief of former child star Lester Plum (played by Joan Blondell), who describes herself as "the Shirley Temple of my day", and performs "On the Good Ship Lollipop" for him.

=== 1938–1940 ===
Temple in The Little Princess, her first color film

The Independent Theatre Owners Association paid for an advertisement in The Hollywood Reporter in May 1938 that included Temple on a list of actors who deserved their salaries while others' (including Katharine Hepburn and Joan Crawford) "box-office draw is nil".

In 1939, she was the subject of the Salvador Dalí painting Shirley Temple, The Youngest, Most Sacred Monster of the Cinema in Her Time, and she was animated with Donald Duck in The Autograph Hound. In 1940, Lester Cowan, an independent film producer, bought the screen rights to F. Scott Fitzgerald's Babylon Revisited for $80. Fitzgerald thought his screenwriting days were over, and with some hesitation, accepted Cowan's offer to write the screenplay titled "Cosmopolitan" based on the short story. After finishing the screenplay, Fitzgerald was told by Cowan that he would not do the film unless Temple starred in the lead role of the youngster Honoria. Fitzgerald objected, saying that at age 12, the actress was too worldly for the part and would detract from the aura of innocence otherwise framed by Honoria's character. After meeting Temple in July, Fitzgerald changed his mind, and tried to persuade her mother to let her star in the film. However, her mother demurred. In any case, the Cowan project was shelved by the producer. Fitzgerald was later credited with the use of the original story for The Last Time I Saw Paris starring Elizabeth Taylor.

As her contract with 20th Century-Fox was coming to a close, Temple's mother applied her for entrance into the Westlake School for Girls in September 1939. There, Temple would enroll as a seventh-grader. Temple noted that she had difficulty adapting to a school environment after having spent much of her youth with adults and private tutors. However, her classmate June Lockhart described her as having "integrated herself right away" and seeming "delighted to be there". Temple frequently attended school dances and extracurricular activities, and according to Lockhart, "students did not treat her differently despite her successful film career." Temple graduated from the school in May 1945.

=== 1941–1950: Final films and retirement ===
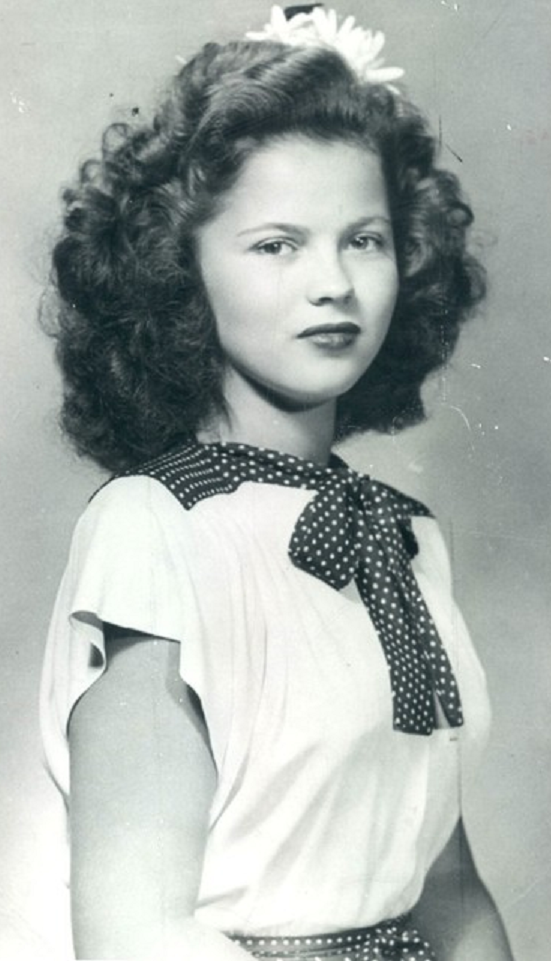
Temple in 1943

After leaving 20th Century-Fox, Temple signed a contract with Metro-Goldwyn-Mayer. However, upon meeting with MGM producer Arthur Freed for a preliminary interview, he allegedly exposed his genitals to her. According to Temple, when she responded with nervous giggles, Freed threw her out of his office and ended their contract before any films were produced. The next idea was teaming Temple with Mickey Rooney and Judy Garland for the musical Babes on Broadway. Fearing that either of those two could easily upstage Temple, MGM replaced her with Virginia Weidler. As a result, Temple's only film for MGM was the unsuccessful film Kathleen, released in December 1941. Miss Annie Rooney (1942) distributed by United Artists, was also unsuccessful. The Bachelor and the Bobby-Soxer (1947) starring Cary Grant and Fort Apache (1948) starring John Wayne and Henry Fonda were two of her few hit films in the 1940s. Her then-husband John Agar also appeared in Fort Apache. She and future U.S. president Ronald Reagan were both in That Hagen Girl (1947). Temple formally announced her retirement from films in 1950.

== Radio career ==
Temple made her radio debut with a radio drama adaptation promoting the then-upcoming film The Blue Bird on Christmas Eve, 1939. During that radio appearance, a woman arose from her seat and brandished a handgun, pointing it directly at Temple. She froze just long enough for police to stop her. It was later discovered that the woman's daughter had died on the day she mistakenly believed Temple was born, and blamed Temple for stealing her daughter's soul. The woman did not know that Temple was born in 1928, not 1929.

Temple briefly had her own radio series on CBS. Junior Miss debuted March 4, 1942, in which she played the title role. The series was based on stories by Sally Benson. Sponsored by Procter & Gamble, Junior Miss was directed by Gordon Hughes, with David Rose as musical director. The series ended on August 26, 1942.

== Television career ==
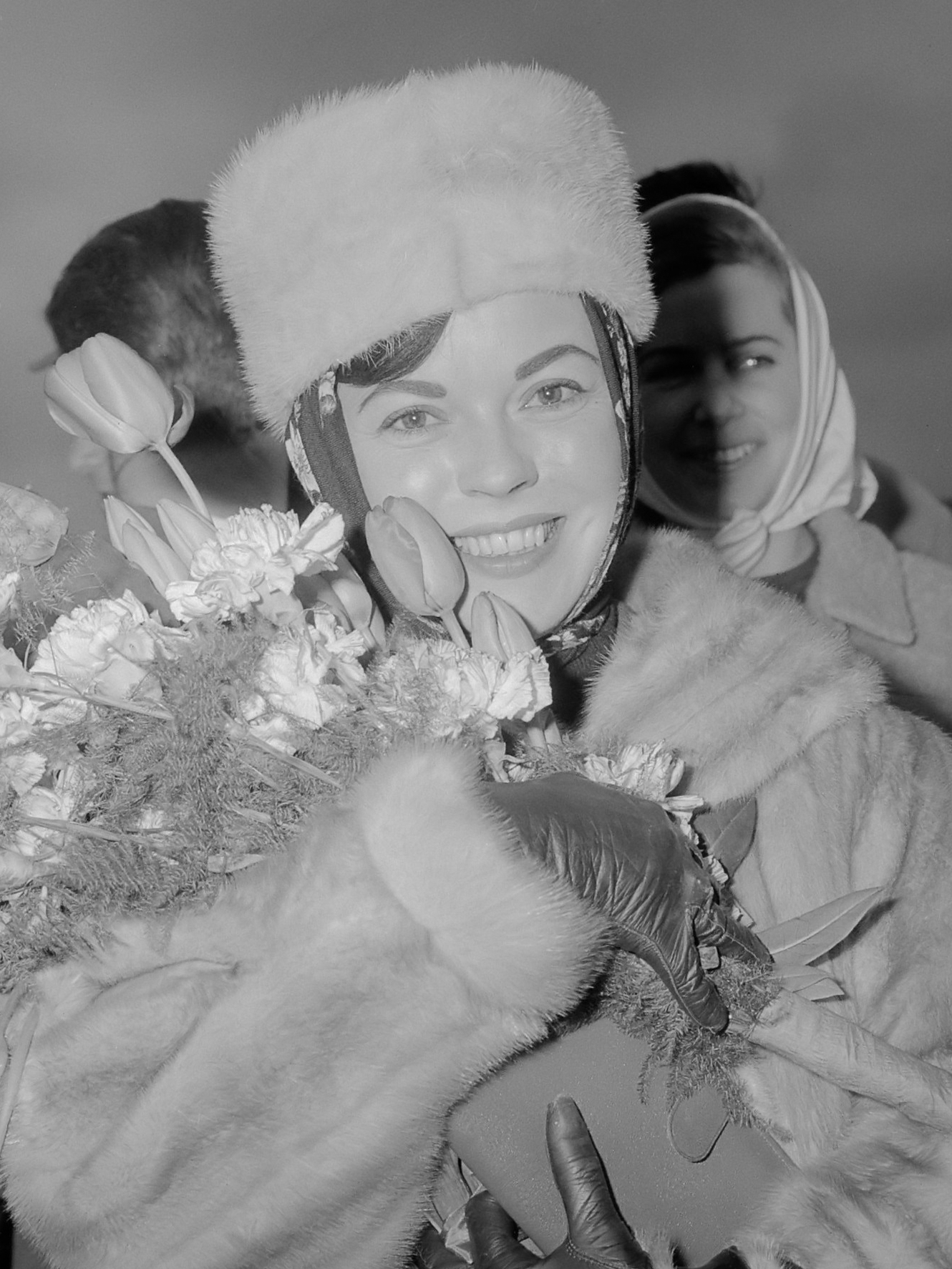
Temple in 1965

From 1958 until 1961, Temple was the hostess, narrator, and an occasional actress on an anthology series of fairy tale adaptations initially called Shirley Temple's Storybook. During 1958 the hour-long program was seen as a series of specials on ABC. Starting in 1959 the series began airing every third Monday night, alternating with Cheyenne. On September 18, 1960, the series moved to NBC, where it was broadcast under the title of The Shirley Temple Show. This version, now airing in color, was a weekly series that ran until September 10, 1961.

In 1999, she hosted the AFI's 100 Years...100 Stars awards show on CBS.

In 2001, Temple served as a consultant on an ABC-TV film production of her autobiography, Child Star: The Shirley Temple Story. Directed by Australian director Nadia Tass and filmed by her husband David Parker, the film stars Ashley Rose Orr as Temple, Emily Anne Hart as teen Shirley, Connie Britton as Gertrude Temple, Colin Friels as George Temple, and Hinton Battle as Bill "Bojangles" Robinson. It was filmed in Port Melbourne, Australia.

== Merchandise and endorsements ==
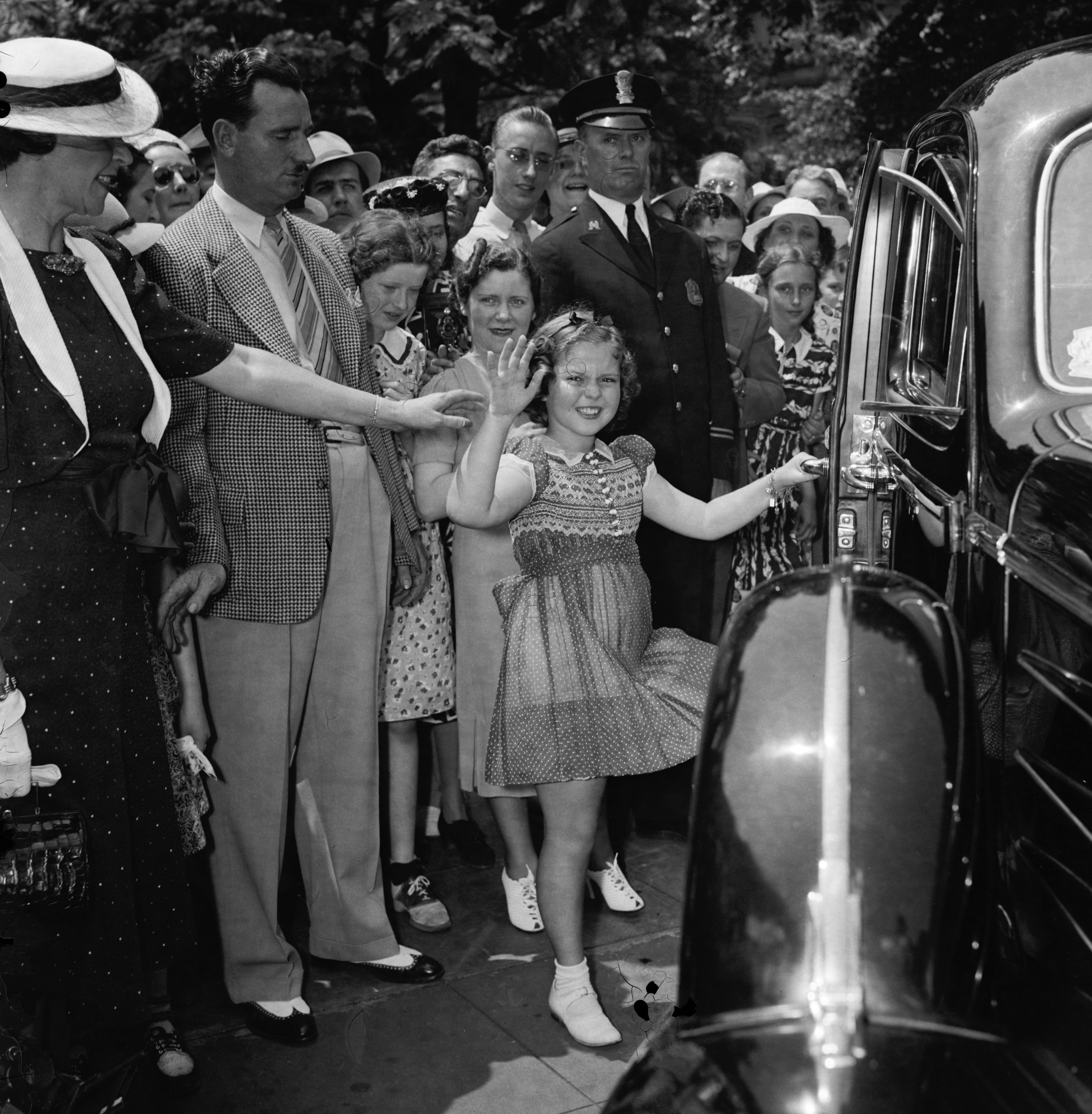
Temple leaving the White House offices with her mother and bodyguard John Griffith, 1938

John Kasson states:

She was also the most popular celebrity to endorse merchandise for children and adults, rivaled only by Mickey Mouse. She transformed children's fashions, popularizing a toddler look for girls up to the age of 12, and by the mid-1930s, Ideal Novelty and Toy Company's line of Shirley Temple dolls accounted for almost a third of all dolls sold in the country.

Successful Shirley Temple items included a line of girls' dresses and many other items.

Alongside licensed merchandise came counterfeit items bearing Temple's likeness to capitalize on her fame, from dolls, clothing, and other accessories to even cigars with her face printed on the label. Temple lamented in her memoirs that it "made no economic sense" to pursue litigation against those who made unlicensed goods under her name; a successful lawsuit was filed by Ideal Toy Company against a certain Lenora Doll Company, which manufactured and sold Shirley Temple dolls without authorization, with Temple herself cited as a co-plaintiff befitting her celebrity status.

== Speculations and rumors ==
At the height of her popularity, Temple was the subject of many speculations and rumors, with several being propagated by the Fox press department. Fox publicized her as a natural talent with no formal acting or dance training. As a way of explaining how she knew stylized buck-and-wing dancing, she was enrolled for two weeks in the Elisa Ryan School of Dancing.

False claims circulated that Temple was not a child, but a 30-year-old dwarf, due in part to her stocky body type. Temple claimed in her autobiography that the Vatican dispatched Father Silvio Masante to investigate whether she was indeed a child; no further evidence was given to corroborate her claim as newspapers of the time simply reported that she was interviewed by the priest who worked as a correspondent for the L'Osservatore Romano. The fact that she never seemed to miss any teeth led some people to conclude that she had all her adult teeth. Temple was actually losing her primary teeth regularly through her days with Fox—for example, during the sidewalk ceremony in front of Grauman's Theatre, where she took off her shoes and placed her bare feet in the concrete, taking attention away from her face. When acting, she wore dental plates and caps to hide the gaps in her teeth. Another rumor said her teeth had been filed to make them appear like baby teeth.

A rumor about Temple's trademark hair was that she wore a wig. On multiple occasions, fans yanked her hair to test the rumor. She later said she wished all she had to do was wear a wig, bemoaning the nightly process she had to endure in the setting of her curls as tedious and grueling, with weekly vinegar rinses that stung her eyes.

Rumors spread that her hair color was not naturally blonde. During the making of Rebecca of Sunnybrook Farm, news spread that she was going to do extended scenes without her trademark curls. During production, she also caught a cold, which caused her to miss a couple of days. As a result, a false report originated in Britain that all of her hair had been cut off.

== Diplomatic career ==
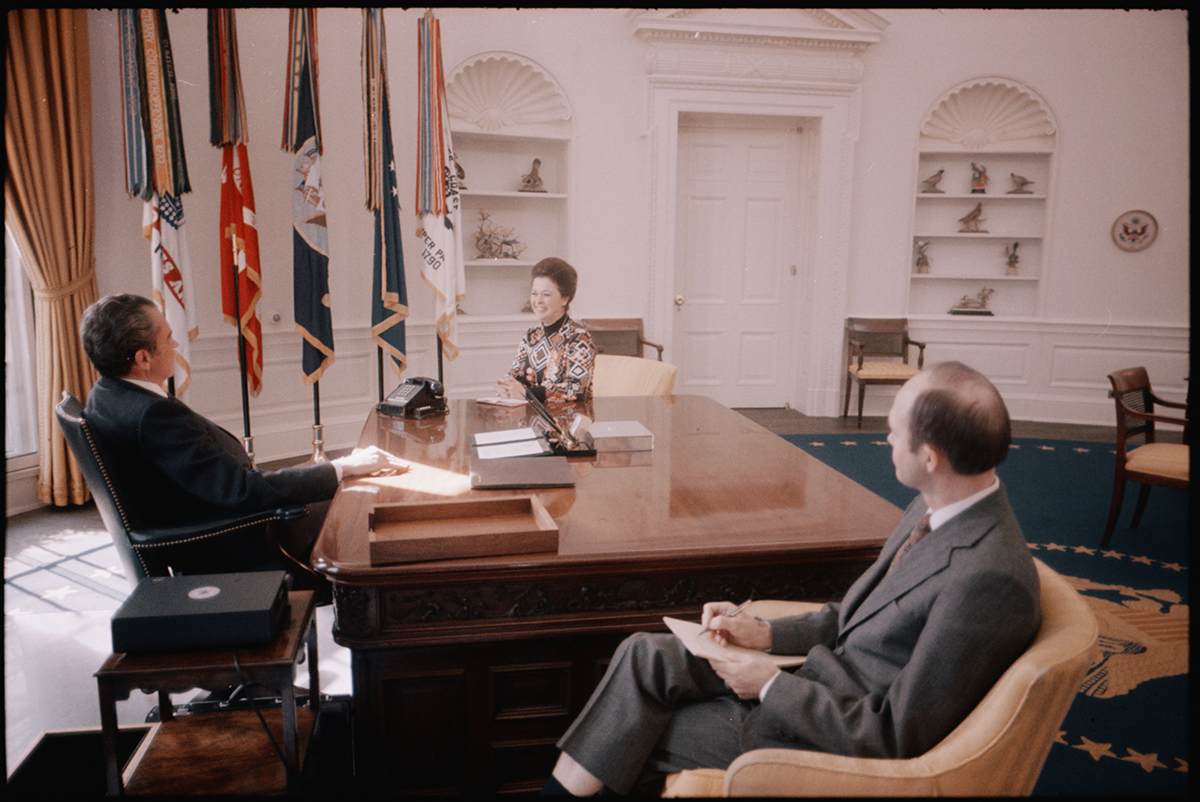
Shirley Temple with President Richard Nixon and Deputy National Security Advisor Brent Scowcroft in the Oval Office, February 1974

Temple became active in the California Republican Party. In 1967, she ran unsuccessfully in a special election in California's 11th congressional district after eight-term Republican J. Arthur Younger died of leukemia. She ran in the open primary as a conservative Republican and came in second with 34,521 votes (22.44%), behind Republican law school professor Pete McCloskey, who placed first in the primary with 52,882 votes (34.37%) and advanced to the general election with Democrat Roy A. Archibald, who finished fourth with 15,069 votes (9.79%), but advanced as the highest-placed Democratic candidate. In the general election, McCloskey was elected with 63,850 votes (57.2%) to Archibald's 43,759 votes (39.2%). Temple received 3,938 votes (3.53%) as an independent write-in.

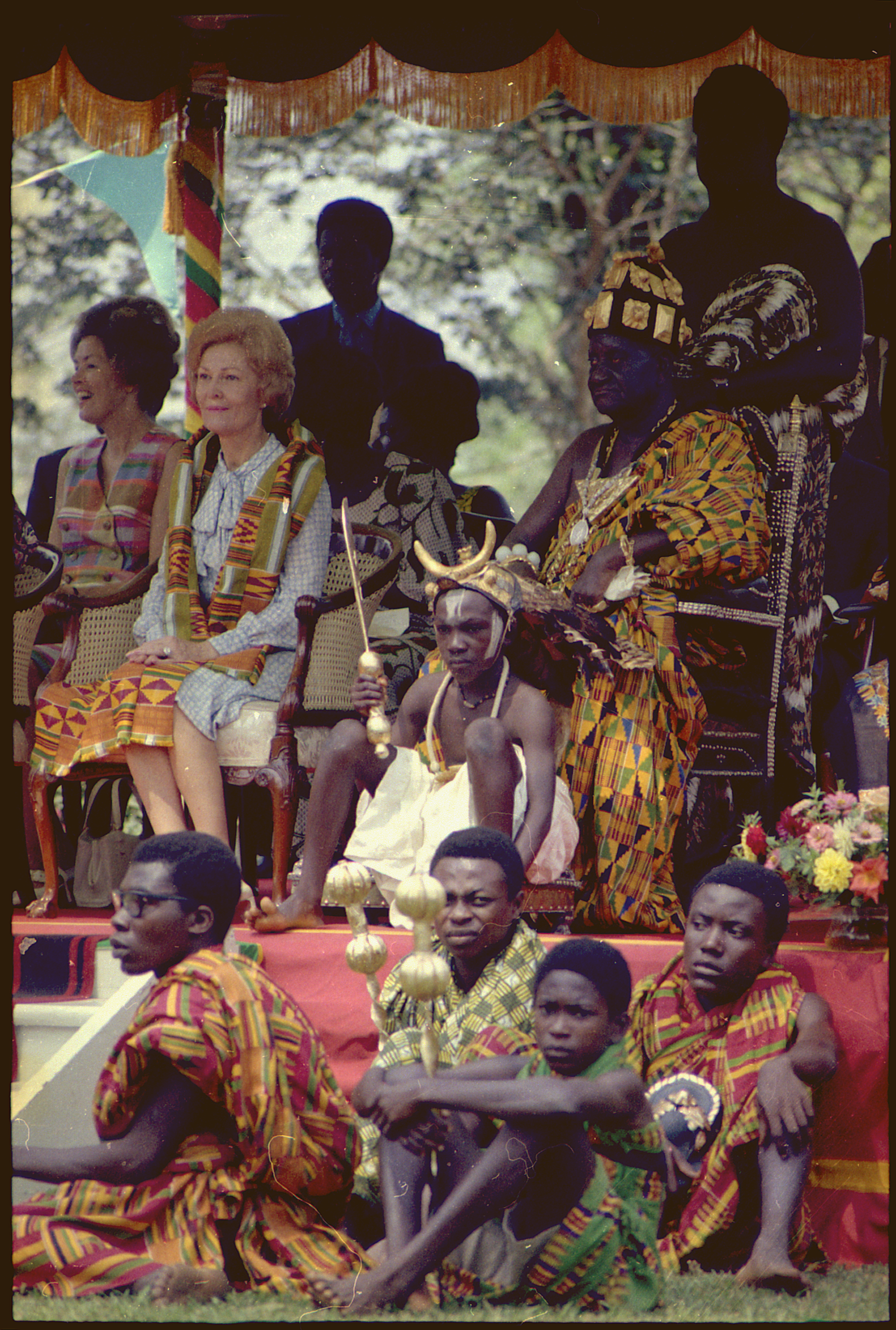
Temple (far left) with First Lady Pat Nixon, and Chief Nana Osae Djan II, in Ghana, 1972

Temple was extensively involved with the Commonwealth Club of California, a public-affairs forum headquartered in San Francisco. She spoke at many meetings throughout the years, and was president for a period in 1984.

Temple got her start in foreign service after her failed run for Congress in 1967, when Henry Kissinger overheard her talking about South West Africa at a party. He was surprised that she knew anything about it. She was appointed as a delegate to the 24th United Nations General Assembly (September – December 1969) by President Richard M. Nixon and United States Ambassador to Ghana (December 6, 1974 – July 13, 1976) by President Gerald R. Ford. She was appointed first female Chief of Protocol of the United States (July 1, 1976 – January 21, 1977).

In 1976, Temple was considered a potential running mate to Gerald Ford in that year's presidential election. While staying in Kansas City for the Republican National Convention, Temple and her husband were given a room with a White House telephone in it. Temple recalled that she speculated to her husband that the phone had been installed as Ford was about to ask her to be his running mate at the convention; however, the phone was disconnected. Bob Dole was instead chosen as the vice presidential nominee.

Temple had hoped after Ronald Reagan's victory in the 1980 presidential election that she would be given a cabinet position or another ambassadorship. Reagan did send Temple as his representative to Paris as part of American inaugural celebrations abroad; however, she was not given any new diplomatic posting during the Reagan administration. Writer Anne Edwards suggested that this was because Temple had supported Reagan's rival, George H. W. Bush, in the 1980 Republican primaries. When rumors circulated that Reagan was planning to reappoint Temple as chief of protocol after Lenore Annenberg's resignation, Temple remarked that she didn't "believe in looking back". While the role was not a posting, Temple was appointed Foreign Affairs Officer within the Reagan State Department, responsible for training new diplomats. In 1987, George Shultz appointed her as an Honorary Foreign Service Officer, the first in the State Department's history.

She served as the United States Ambassador to Czechoslovakia (August 23, 1989 – July 12, 1992), having been appointed by President George H. W. Bush, and was the first and only woman in this job. Temple bore witness to two crucial moments in the history of Communist Czechoslovakia. She was in Prague in August 1968, as a representative of the International Federation of Multiple Sclerosis Societies, and was going to meet with Czechoslovak party leader Alexander Dubček on the very day that Soviet-backed forces invaded the country. Dubček fell out of favor with the Soviets after a series of reforms, known as the Prague Spring. Temple, who was stranded at a hotel as the tanks rolled in, sought refuge on the roof of the hotel. She later reported that it was from there she saw an unarmed woman on the street gunned down by Soviet forces, the sight of which stayed with her for the rest of her life.

Later, after she became ambassador to Czechoslovakia, she was present during the Velvet Revolution, which brought about the end of communism in Czechoslovakia. Temple openly sympathized with anti-communist dissidents, and assisted their efforts. She was ambassador when the United States established formal diplomatic relations with the newly elected government led by Václav Havel. She took the unusual step of personally accompanying Havel on his first official visit to Washington, traveling on the same plane.

== Personal life ==
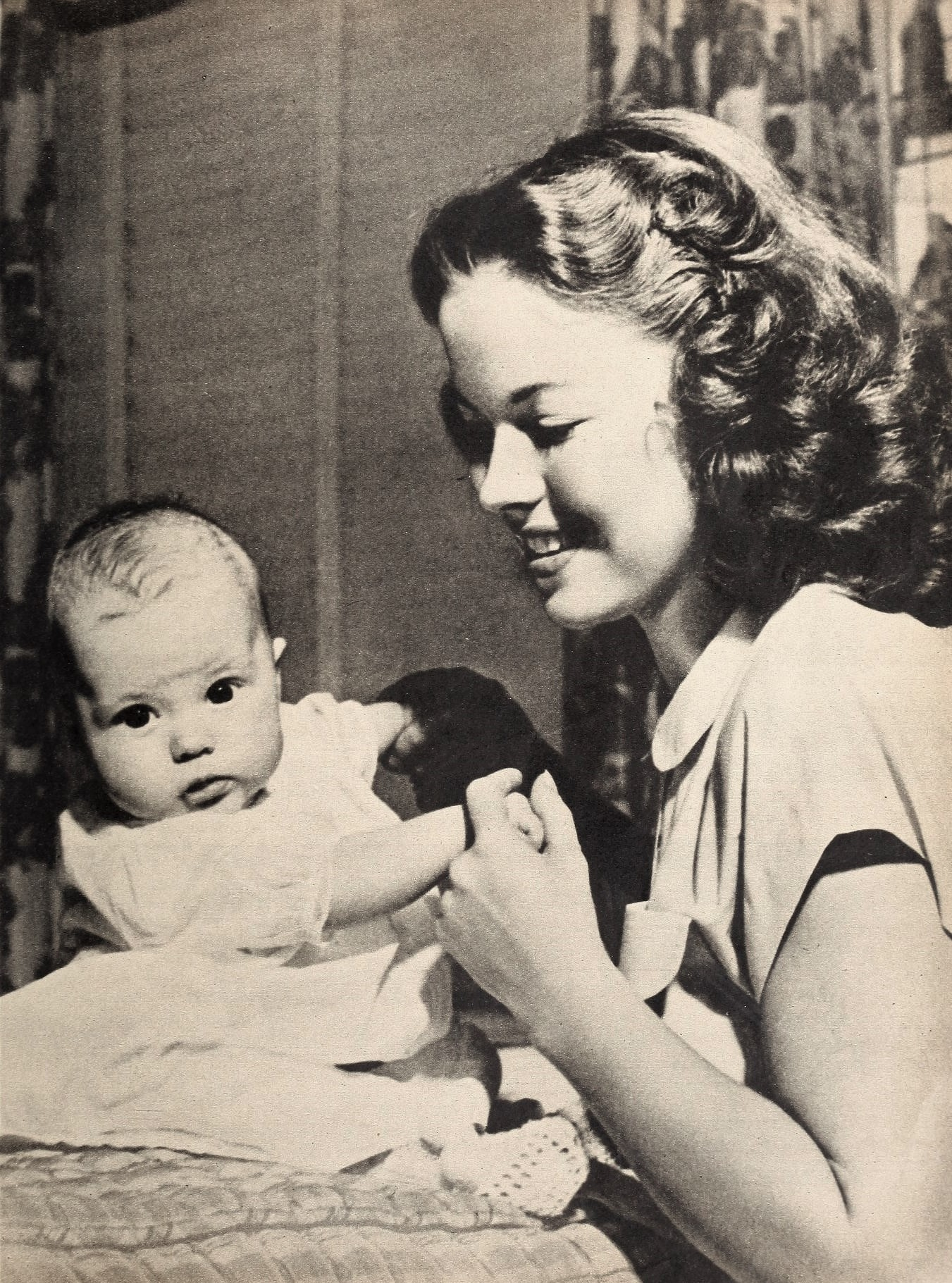
Shirley Temple with her daughter Linda Susan (1948)

In 1943, 15-year-old Temple met 22-year-old John Agar, whom she married two years later in 1945, at age 17. She gave birth to Linda Susan Agar in 1948. Agar was reportedly an alcoholic and had extramarital affairs. Temple divorced Agar in 1950 on the grounds of mental cruelty.

In 1950, in Hawaii, Temple met Charles Alden Black at a cocktail party. Temple was married to Black from 1950 until his death on August 4, 2005. They had a son, Charles Alden Black Jr., and a daughter, Lori, who became a bassist for the rock band the Melvins.

At age 44 in 1972, Temple was diagnosed with breast cancer. At the time, cancer was not typically discussed openly, and Temple's public disclosure was a significant milestone in improving breast cancer awareness and reducing stigma around the disease.

== Death ==
Temple died at age 85 on February 10, 2014, at her home in Woodside, California. The cause of death, according to her death certificate released on March 3, 2014, was chronic obstructive pulmonary disease (COPD). Temple was a lifelong cigarette smoker but avoided displaying her habit in public because she did not want to set a bad example for her fans. She is buried at Alta Mesa Memorial Park.

== Awards, honors, and legacy ==
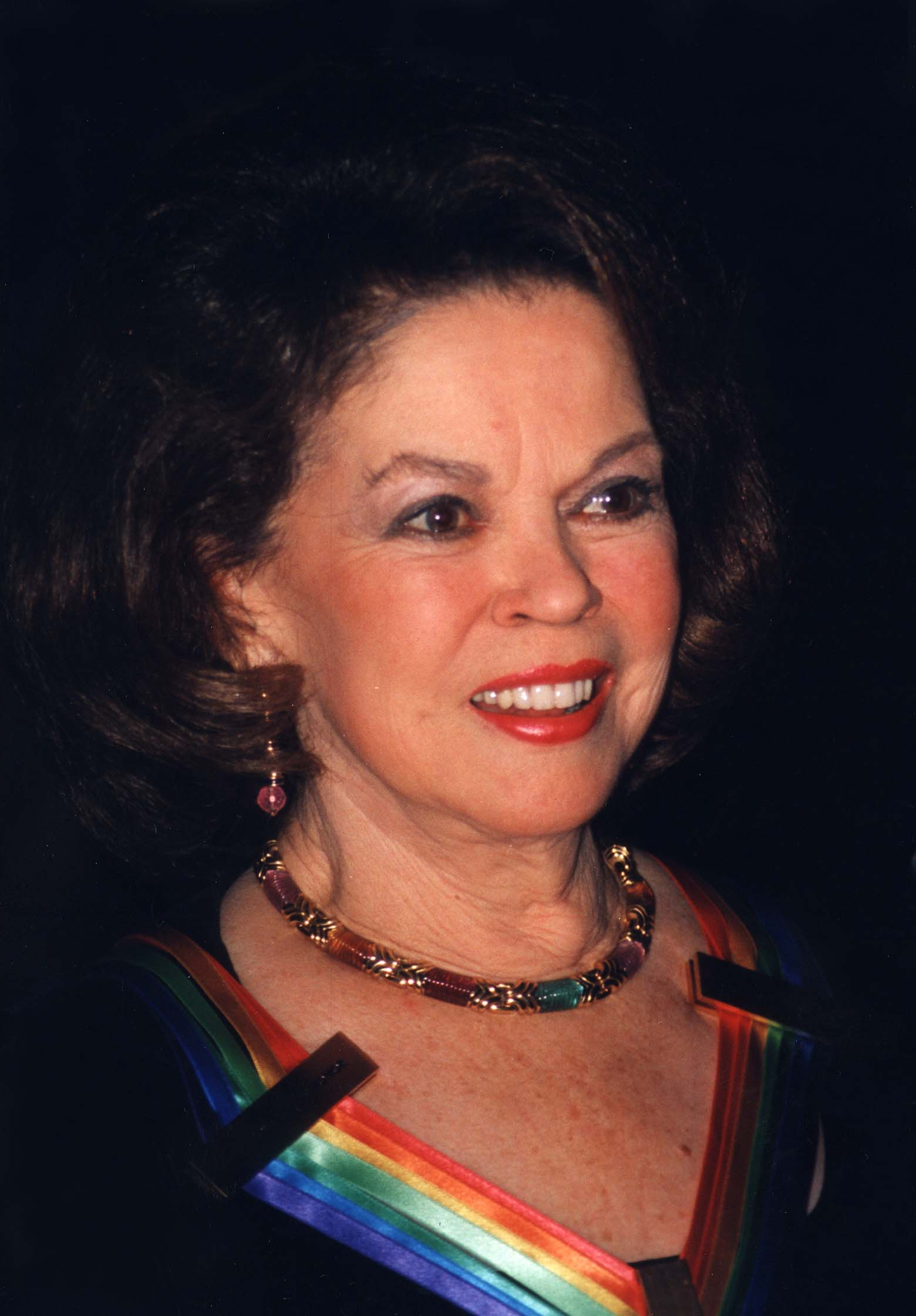
Temple wearing the Kennedy Center Honors, 1998

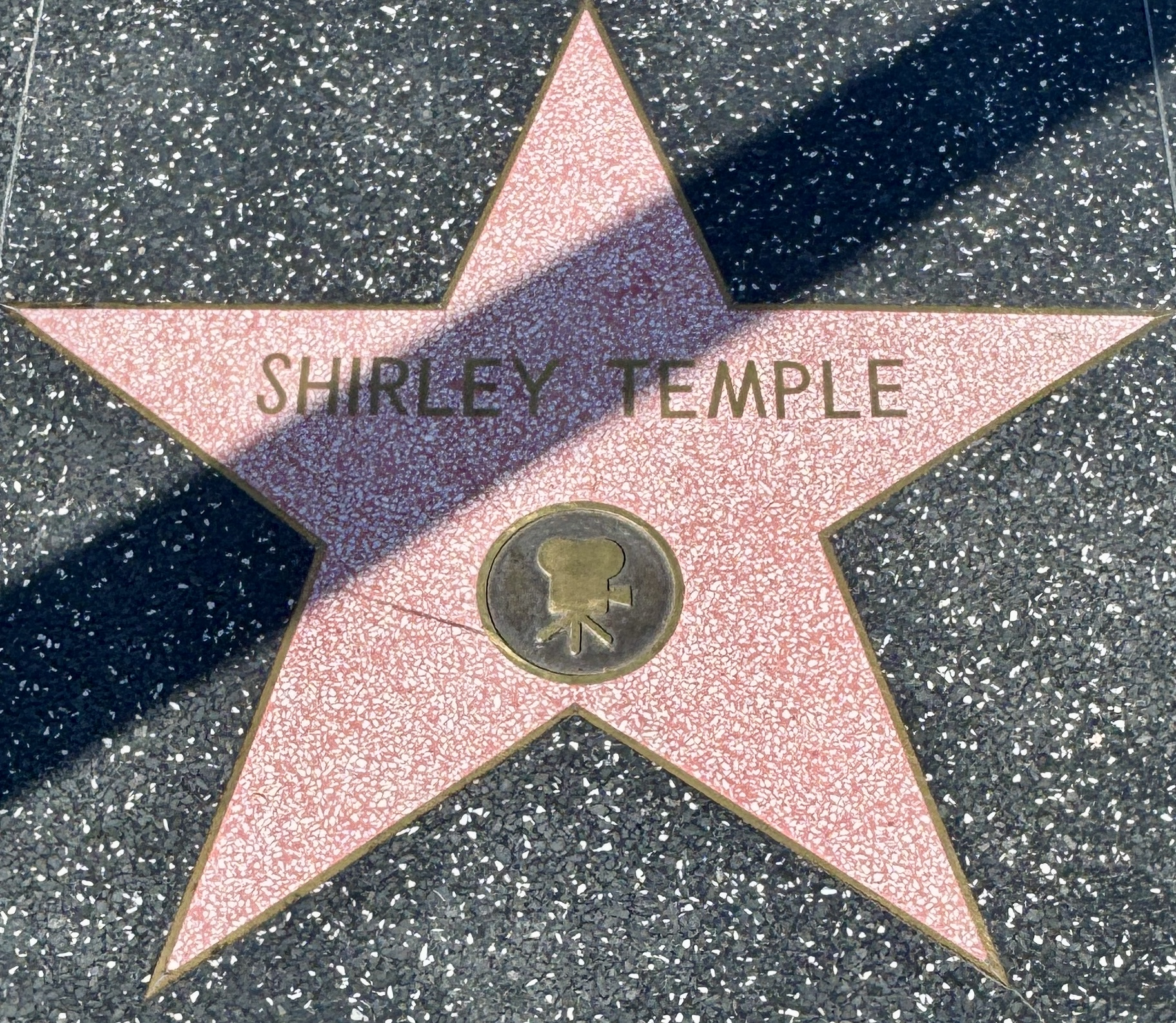
Hollywood Walk of Fame star

On March 14, 1935, Shirley left her footprints and handprints in the wet cement at the forecourt of Grauman's Chinese Theatre in Hollywood. She was the grand marshal of the New Year's Day Rose Parade in Pasadena, California, three times in 1939, 1989, and 1999. On February 8, 1960, she received a star on the Hollywood Walk of Fame.

In 1970, she received the Golden Plate Award of the American Academy of Achievement. In February 1980, Temple was honored by the Freedoms Foundation of Valley Forge, Pennsylvania. In 1975, Temple was installed as an honorary deputy paramount chief of the Oguaa people of Ghana.

In 1998, she received the Kennedy Center Honor for her achievement in film.

Her name is further immortalized by the mocktail named after her, although Temple found the drink far too sweet for her palate. In 1988, Temple brought a lawsuit to prevent a bottled soda version from using her name.

On June 9, 2021, Temple was featured on that day's Google Doodle in celebration of the opening anniversary of "Love, Shirley Temple" a special exhibit featuring a collection of her rare memorabilia at Santa Monica History Museum.

On October 30, 2025, the Temple family estate announced that veteran producer Marty Tudor acquired the film, television and stage rights to produce works based on Shirley's life and career. Also included in the acquisition were the rights to two unpublished autobiographies by Temple which are to be published posthumously.

== See also ==
- List of American former child actors
- List of female ambassadors of the United States
- List of oldest and youngest Academy Award winners and nominees
