= The Last Time I Saw Paris =

1954 film by Richard Brooks

- Theatrical release poster
- Directed by: Richard Brooks
- Screenplay by: Julius J. Epstein; Philip G. Epstein; Richard Brooks
- Based on: "Babylon Revisited" by F. Scott Fitzgerald
- Produced by: Jack Cummings
- Starring: Elizabeth Taylor; Van Johnson; Walter Pidgeon; Donna Reed; Eva Gabor; Kurt Kasznar
- Cinematography: Joseph Ruttenberg
- Edited by: John D. Dunning
- Music by: Conrad Salinger
- Production companies: Metro-Goldwyn-Mayer; Jeffy Productions
- Distributed by: Loew's, Inc.
- Release date: November 18, 1954
- Running time: 116 minutes
- Country: United States
- Language: English
- Budget: $1,960,000
- Box office: $4,940,000

The Last Time I Saw Paris is a 1954 American romantic drama film directed by Richard Brooks and produced by Jack Cummings for Metro-Goldwyn-Mayer. The screenplay was written by Julius J. Epstein, Philip G. Epstein and Brooks, loosely based on F. Scott Fitzgerald's 1930 short story "Babylon Revisited."

The film stars Elizabeth Taylor and Van Johnson in his last role for MGM, with Walter Pidgeon, Donna Reed, Eva Gabor, Kurt Kasznar, George Dolenz, Sandy Descher, Odette and Roger Moore in his Hollywood debut. The film's title song, written by composer Jerome Kern and lyricist Oscar Hammerstein II, was already a classic and inspired the film's title. Although the song had already won an Academy Award for Best Original Song after its film debut in 1941's Lady Be Good, it is featured more prominently in The Last Time I Saw Paris.

== Plot ==
As World War II ends in Europe, Stars and Stripes journalist Charles Wills takes to the streets of Paris to cover the celebrations. He is suddenly grabbed by a beautiful woman who kisses him and disappears. Charles follows the crowd to Café Dhingo and meets another pretty woman named Marion Ellswirth. She invites him to join her father's celebration of the end of the war. Charles, Marion and her French suitor Claude Matine arrive at the Ellswirth household, where Charles discovers that the woman who had kissed him is Marion's younger sister Helen.

Marion and Helen's father James had survived World War I and promptly joined the Lost Generation and raised his daughters to desire a similar lifestyle. Helen uses her beauty to sustain a life of luxury, even though they are broke. Marion looks for serious-minded and conventional young men such as Claude Matine, an aspiring prosecutor, and Charles, the future novelist.

Charles and Helen start dating and fall in love. After Helen recovers from pneumonia, they marry and settle in Paris. Helen gives birth to a daughter named Vicki. Marion, having lost Charles to Helen, marries Claude. Charles struggles to make ends meet with his meager salary, unsuccessfully works on his novels and looks after Vicki.

The barren oil fields in Texas that James had bought years before begin to produce. Charles, to whom James had given the oil fields as a dowry, quits his job, and Helen and James begin to host parties. Sudden wealth changes Helen, who becomes more responsible, and Charles parties his wealth away after quitting his newspaper job and having all of his novels rejected by publishers. They also each start to grow apart with them both having affairs.

Helen flirts with handsome tennis player Paul Lane and Charles competes in a Monte Carlo-to-Paris race. After the race, Charles returns to Paris to find Helen in Café Dhingo with Paul. After the men fight, Charles returns home and engages the chain on the door. When Helen comes home and cannot enter, she walks to her sister's home in the snow and rain, catches pneumonia again and dies.

Marion is awarded full custody of Vicki and Charles returns home to America. A few years later, having published a book and stopped drinking excessively, Charles returns to Paris to persuade Marion to give Vicki to him. Marion refuses, still resentful because he had fallen for Helen instead of her and for his involvement in Helen's death. Claude tells Marion that she is punishing Charles for not realizing that Marion loved him and marrying Helen.

Marion visits Café Dhingo, where Charles is gazing at a large painting of Helen. Marion tells him that Helen would not have wanted him to be alone. Outside the cafe, Claude is with Vicki, who runs to be with Charles.

== Cast ==
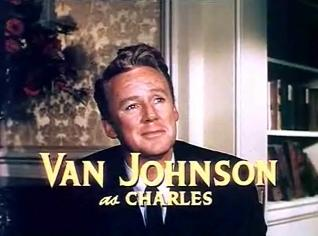
Johnson as Charles Wills

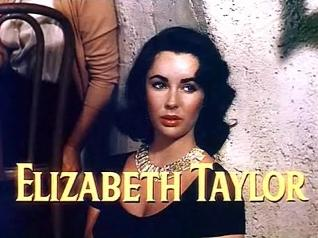
Taylor as Helen Ellswirth

- Elizabeth Taylor as Helen Ellswirth Wills
- Van Johnson as Charles Wills
- Walter Pidgeon as James Ellswirth
- Donna Reed as Marion Ellswirth Matine
- Eva Gabor as Lorraine Quarl
- Kurt Kasznar as Maurice
- George Dolenz as Claude Matine
- Roger Moore as Paul Lane
- Sandy Descher as Vicki Wills
- Celia Lovsky as Mama Jeanette
- Peter Leeds as Barney
- Dave Seville as Charlie
- John Doucette as Campbell
- Odette Myrtil as singer
- Beatrice Miller as Grace (uncredited)
- Matt Moore as Englishman (uncredited)

== Background ==
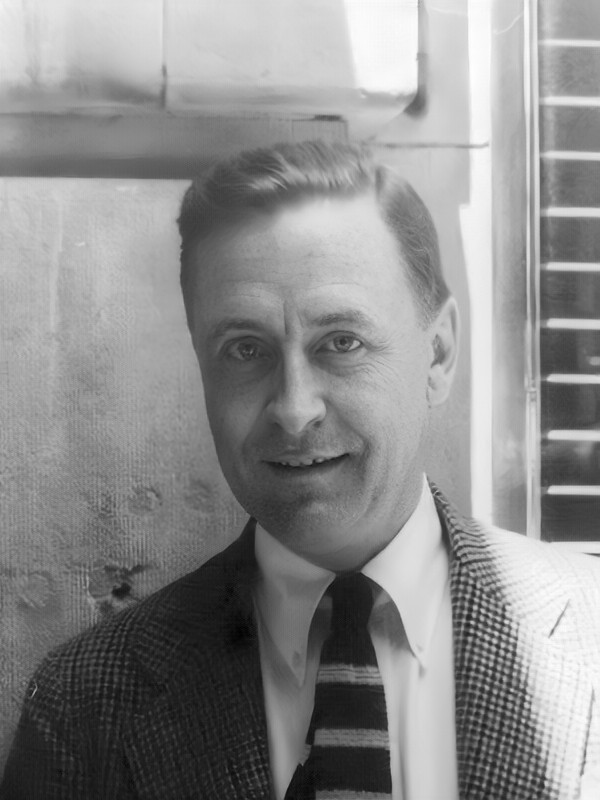
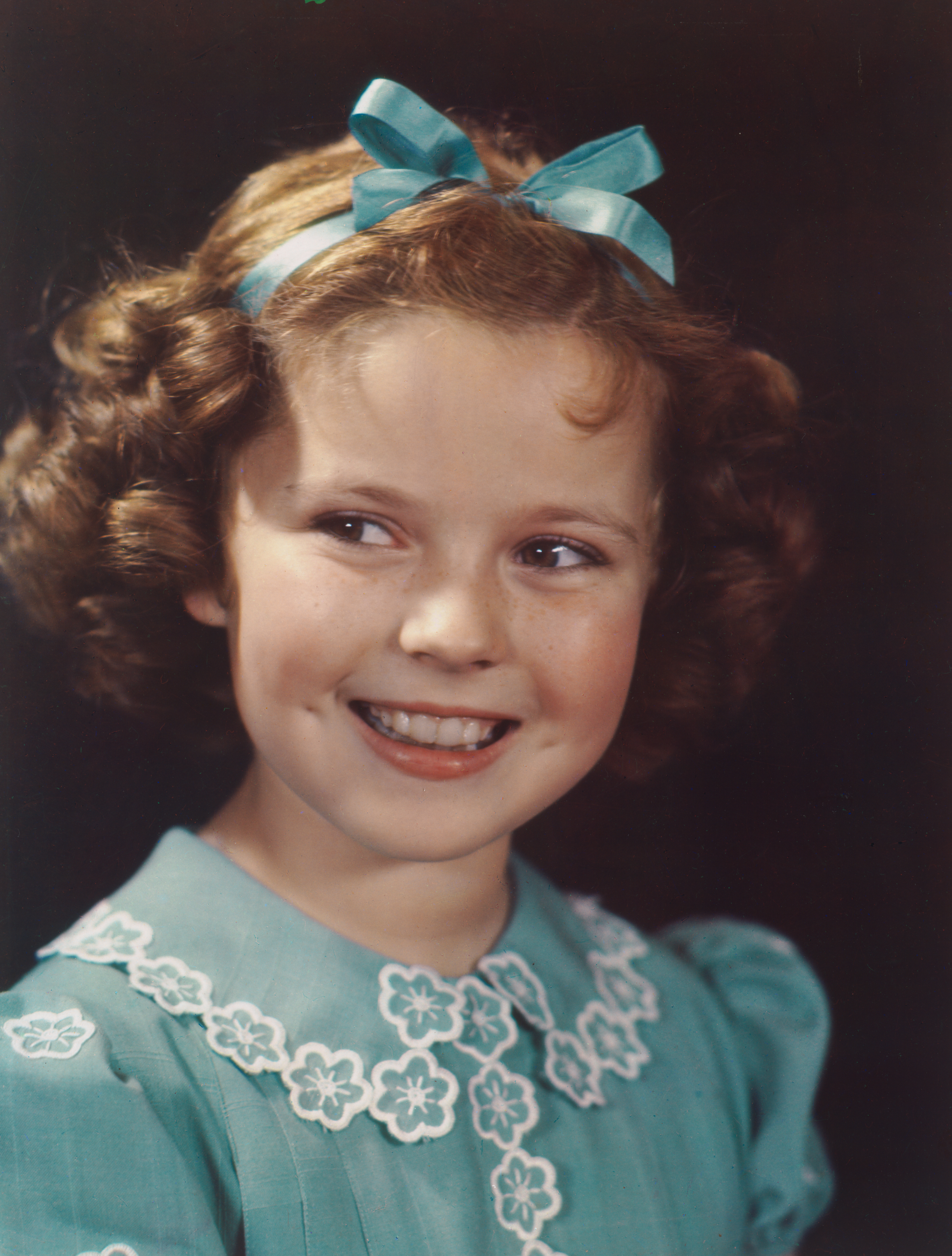
In the summer of 1940, author F. Scott Fitzgerald and film producer Lester Cowan attempted to persuade Shirley Temple's mother to allow her daughter to star in a film adaptation of his December 1930 short story "Babylon Revisited".

In March 1940, film producer Lester Cowan purchased the screen rights to F. Scott Fitzgerald's December 1930 short story "Babylon Revisited" for $1,000. Known for producing the 1940 film My Little Chickadee starring W.C. Fields and Mae West, Cowan planned to develop the film with Harry Cohn's Columbia Studios.

In an unusual move, Cowan hired Fitzgerald himself to adapt his work for the screen at $500 per week, ultimately paying the financially struggling author a total of $5,000 (equivalent to $114,905 in 2025). Although this salary fell below Fitzgerald's usual studio rate, Cowan promised him a bonus if the film reached production.

Although initially wary of Cowan, Fitzgerald soon grew comfortable working with him, believing the independent film producer respected his talents as a writer. Despite the cut-rate pay, Fitzgerald devoted himself to the project, appreciating the chance to adapt one of his finest stories without any studio interference.

By August 1940, Fitzgerald completed his second draft, titled Cosmopolitan, and included an author's note warning that, like Rebecca or The Shop Around the Corner, the film adaptation should have no moral lessons whatsoever, leaving viewers to draw their own conclusions about the perils of excess in the Jazz Age.

Cowan and Fitzgerald sought Shirley Temple for the role of Charles' daughter, originally named Honoria Wales in his story treatment and renamed Victoria Wales in his final screenplay. In July 1940, five months before his death, Fitzgerald discussed the screenplay with Temple and her mother Gertrude. Temple recalled that Fitzgerald, a former alcoholic, consumed numerous Coca-Colas during the meeting. When Temple's mother and Cowan failed to agree on terms, the project stalled.

After Fitzgerald's death in December 1940, his screenplay adaptation failed to be produced, and Lester Cowan sold the screen rights to Metro-Goldwyn-Mayer. Fourteen years later, following the revival of Fitzgerald's popularity as an author in the wake of World War II, MGM hired Philip G. Epstein, Julius J. Epstein and Richard Brooks to adapt the story for the 1954 film The Last Time I Saw Paris. They changed the setting to post-World War II Paris and the main character of Charles Wills from an American businessman into an aspiring novelist.

== Reception ==
Where Fitzgerald did it in a few words—in a few subtle phrases that evoked a reckless era of golden dissipation toward the end of the Twenties' boom—Richard Brooks, who directed this picture after polishing up an Epstein-brothers' script, has done it in a nigh two-hour assembly of bistro balderdash and lush, romantic scenes.

— Bosley Crowther, The New York Times

At the time of the film's release, Variety called it an "engrossing romantic drama." Bosley Crowther wrote "The story is trite. The motivations are thin. The writing is glossy and pedestrian. The acting is pretty much forced. Mr. Johnson as the husband is too bumptious when happy and too dreary when drunk; Miss Taylor as the wife is delectable, but she is also occasionally quite dull. Mr. Pidgeon is elaborately devilish, Sandra Descher as the child is over-cute, Donna Reed as the bitter sister is vapid and several others are in the same vein."

In 2011, the Time Out Film Guide said "Despite a very corny script from Julius and Philip Epstein, which borrows clichés from Casablanca and countless An American in Paris yarns, this remains an enjoyable, if heavy-handed, melodrama...Pidgeon steals the show as ... a penniless chancer who still manages to live the good life."

On Rotten Tomatoes, 78% of 9 critics' reviews are positive, with an average rating of 6.3/10.

== Box office ==
According to MGM records, the film earned $2,635,000 in the U.S. and Canada and $2,305,000 in other markets, resulting in a profit of $980,000.

== Copyright ==
The film was released in 1954; however, there was an error with the Roman numerals in the copyright notice showing "MCMXLIV" (1944) instead of "MCMLIV" (1954), meaning the term of copyright started 10 years before the film was released. Thus, the normal 28-year copyright term ended just 18 years after the film was released, and MGM neglected to renew it presumably because it believed there was still 10 years left in the term. The film entered the public domain in the United States in 1972.
