= Charles Alden Black =

American businessman (1919–2005)

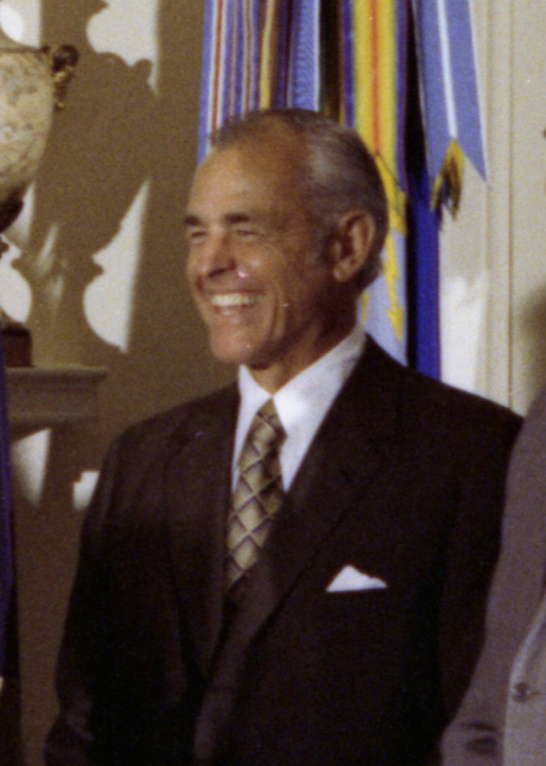
- Black in 1976
- Born: March 6, 1919; Oakland, California, U.S.
- Died: August 4, 2005 (aged 86); Woodside, California, U.S.
- Education: Harvard University; Stanford University (MBA)
- Occupations: Businessman; oceanographer
- Spouse: Shirley Temple (m. 1950)
- Children: 2, including Lori
- Military career
- Branch: United States Navy
- Service years: 1941–1955
- Rank: Lieutenant commander
- Conflicts: World War II; Pacific War; Korean War

Charles Alden Black (March 6, 1919 – August 4, 2005) was an American businessman known for his work in aquaculture and oceanography as well as his marriage to Shirley Temple.

== Early life ==
Black was born in Oakland, California, son of James Byers Black (1890–1965) and Katharine McElrath Black (1889–1984). He had two siblings, James Byers Black Jr. and Kathryn Black Burk. Through his mother, he was a 4th great-grandson of John Sevier, a governor of Tennessee. He also descends from Mayflower passenger John Alden, which is where his middle name comes from, and a 5th great-grandson of Timothy Edwards, thus making him a 5th great-nephew of Jonathan Edwards. His father, James, was president and chairman of the Pacific Gas and Electric Company.

He attended Hotchkiss School in Connecticut.

== Career ==
He served in the U.S. Navy during World War II as an intelligence officer in the South Pacific. He again served during the Korean War as an intelligence officer. Black attended Harvard Business School for a year prior to joining the navy in 1941. After World War II, he received his MBA from Stanford University in 1946. Then in the late 1950s, he lived in Hawaii, working as an executive for Castle & Cooke and Dole Pineapple companies. By the end of the Korean War, he was a lieutenant commander.

Black was an executive at the Stanford Research Institute (now known as SRI International) from 1952 to 1957 and with Ampex Corp from 1957 to 1965. In the 1960s, Black gravitated to what would become the bulk of his life's work—aquaculture and oceanography. He co-founded a hatchery for oysters and abalone and later created Mardela Corp., a fishery and hatchery company headquartered in Burlingame, California, which conducted ventures such as catfish and salmon farming. He later served as a consultant on maritime issues and served as a regent for Santa Clara University.

== Personal life ==
He was married to the former child actress and diplomat Shirley Temple from December 16, 1950, until his death. He died from myelodysplastic syndrome on August 4, 2005, at his home in Woodside, California, at the age of 86. They had a son, Charles Alden Black Jr., and two daughters, Susan (from Temple's previous marriage) and Lori Black.

Black was known as an avid surfer and yachtsman. He twice took part in the Transpacific Yacht Race. He met Temple while staying in Hawaii in 1950, later marrying by the end of the year. At the time of their meeting, Black had not seen any of Temple's films, and did not recognise her.

He was a member of the Bohemian Club, and was later one of six founders of the Guardsmen, a San Francisco charity.
