= Your Choice Live Series Vol. 12 =

Live album by Melvins
- Released: 1991
- Recorded: January 23, 1991
- Genre: Sludge metal
- Length: 30:19
- Label: Your Choice
- Producer: Tobby Holzinger

Melvins chronology
Ozma (1989)	Your Choice Live Series Vol. 12 (1991)	Bullhead (1991)

Professional ratings
Review scores
Source	Rating
AllMusic	2.5/5 stars
Metal Archives	9/10 stars

Your Choice Live Series Vol. 12 is a live album by American rock band the Melvins, released in 1991 through Your Choice Records. It was recorded on January 23, 1991, at Oberhaus in Alzey, Germany. The band also performed the song "It's Shoved"; it was left off this album but later released on the It's Your Choice compilation.

"Tanked" is an early live version of the song "Wispy" that appears on the Eggnog EP.

== Track listing ==
All tracks are written by Buzz Osborne.

No.	Title	Length
1.	"Heater Moves and Eyes"	2:33
2.	"At a Crawl"	3:05
3.	"Anaconda"	2:53
4.	"Eye Flys"	7:10
5.	"Kool Legged"	4:37
6.	"Tanked"	0:44
7.	"Let God Be Your Gardener"	1:59
8.	"Revulsion"	7:13

== Personnel ==
- Lorax - bass
- Kingbuzzo - vocals, guitar
- Daledoe - drums, vocals
- Tobby Holzinger - producer
