= Gluey Porch Treatments =

Studio album by Melvins
- Released: 1987
- Recorded: October 1986
- Studio: Studio D (Sausalito, California)
- Genres: Sludge metal; punk rock
- Length: 38:22
- Label: Alchemy
- Producers: Mark Deutrom; Carl Herlofsson

Melvins chronology
| Six Songs (1986) | Gluey Porch Treatments (1987) | Ozma (1989) |

Gluey Porch Treatments is the debut studio album by American rock band Melvins, released in 1987 through Alchemy Records. The original release was vinyl only. The album was later released on cassette tape with the Six Songs EP through Boner Records and appears as bonus material on the CD version of Ozma. Tracks 18–29 can only be found on the 1999 Ipecac Recordings re-release; these songs are taken from a boombox demo.

The album is considered one of the first examples of sludge metal and a blueprint for grunge.

== Background ==
"Steve Instant Newman" and "As It Was" are re-recordings of "Disinvite" and "Easy As It Was", respectively, as heard on the Six Songs EP.

The title track "Gluey Porch Treatments" was re-recorded and released in 2001 on their thirteenth studio album, Electroretard.

== Critical reception ==
Professional ratings
Review scores
| Source | Rating |
|---|---|
| AllMusic | 4/5 stars |

AllMusic critic Ned Raggett praised the album, writing: "Drawn-out syllables at the end of lines descending into murk, bellowing half-understandable insanities, flanged warbles and squeals: It's all there." Dave Grohl described it as heavier and better than Black Sabbath.

== Track listing ==
All tracks are written by Buzz Osborne, except where noted.

Side one
| No. | Title | Writer(s) | Length |
|---|---|---|---|
| 1. | "Eye Flys" | | 6:16 |
| 2. | "Echo Head/Don't Piece Me" | Melvins | 2:51 |
| 3. | "Heater Moves and Eyes" | | 3:52 |
| 4. | "Steve Instant Newman" | Melvins | 1:31 |
| 5. | "Influence of Atmosphere" | | 1:51 |
| 6. | "Exact Paperbacks" | | 0:43 |
| 7. | "Happy Grey or Black" | Melvins | 2:01 |
| 8. | "Leeech" (Green River cover) | Mark Arm, Steve Turner | 2:32 |

Side two
| No. | Title | Writer(s) | Length |
|---|---|---|---|
| 9. | "Glow God" | | 0:51 |
| 10. | "Big as a Mountain" | | 0:57 |
| 11. | "Heavyness of the Load" | | 3:06 |
| 12. | "Flex with You" | | 0:54 |
| 13. | "Bitten into Sympathy" | | 1:45 |
| 14. | "Gluey Porch Treatments" | | 0:48 |
| 15. | "Clipping Roses" | | 0:49 |
| 16. | "As It Was" | Melvins | 2:51 |
| 17. | "Over from Under the Excrement" | | 4:39 |

1999 CD reissue bonus tracks
| No. | Title | Length |
|---|---|---|
| 18. | "Echohead" (Demo) | 0:32 |
| 19. | "Flex with You" (Demo) | 0:58 |
| 20. | "Don't Piece Me" (Demo) | 2:20 |
| 21. | "Bitten into Sympathy" (Demo) | 1:30 |
| 22. | "Exact Paperbacks" (Demo) | 0:46 |
| 23. | "Glow God/Big as a Mountain" (Demo) | 1:55 |
| 24. | "Heaviness of the Load" (Demo) | 3:04 |
| 25. | "Happy Gray or Black" (Demo) | 1:59 |
| 26. | "Heater Moves and Eyes" (Demo) | 4:29 |
| 27. | "Gluey Porch Treatments" (Demo) | 0:52 |
| 28. | "Eye Flys" (Demo) | 3:11 |
| 29. | "Clipping Roses" (Demo) | 0:55 |

== Personnel ==
Melvins

- Buzz Osborne – guitar, vocals, liner notes on 1999 Ipecac reissue
- Matt Lukin – bass, vocals
- Dale Crover – drums

Additional personnel

- Mark Deutrom – producer, mixing
- Carl Herlofsson – engineer, mixing
- David Musgrove – second engineer
- Victor Hayden – original artwork, executive producer
- Mackie Osborne – new artwork on 1999 Ipecac reissue
