= Taps at Reveille =

1935 story collection by F. Scott Fitzgerald

- First edition
- Author: F. Scott Fitzgerald
- Language: English
- Genre: Short stories
- Publisher: Charles Scribner's Sons
- Publication date: March 10, 1935
- Publication place: United States
- Media type: Print (hardback and paperback)
- Pages: 407
- ISBN: 978-0684124643
- OCLC: 8894678

Taps at Reveille is a collection of 18 short stories by American writer F. Scott Fitzgerald, published by Charles Scribner's Sons in 1935. It was the fourth and final volume of previously uncollected short stories Fitzgerald published in his lifetime. The volume appeared a year after his novel Tender is the Night was published. The collection includes several stories featuring autobiographical creations derived from Fitzgerald's youth, namely Basil Duke Lee and Josephine Perry.

The collection's last story, "Babylon Revisited", is one of Fitzgerald's most highly regarded.

== Contents ==
Basil
- "The Scandal Detectives" (Saturday Evening Post, April 28, 1928)
- "The Freshest Boy" (Saturday Evening Post, July 28, 1928)
- "He Thinks He's Wonderful" (Saturday Evening Post, September 29, 1928)
- "The Captured Shadow" (Saturday Evening Post, December 29, 1928)
- "The Perfect Life" (Saturday Evening Post, January 25, 1929)

Josephine

- "First Blood" (Saturday Evening Post, April 5, 1930)
- "A Nice Quiet Place" (Saturday Evening Post, May 31, 1930)
- "A Woman with a Past" (Saturday Evening Post, September 6, 1930)

Other Stories

- "Crazy Sunday" (American Mercury, October 1932)
- "Two Wrongs" (Saturday Evening Post, January 18, 1930)
- "The Night of Chancellorsville" (Esquire, February 1935)
- "The Last of the Belles" (Saturday Evening Post, March 2, 1929)
- "Majesty" (Saturday Evening Post, July 13, 1929)
- "Family in the Wind" (Saturday Evening Post, June 4, 1932)
- "A Short Trip Home" (Saturday Evening Post, December 17, 1927)
- "One Interne" (Saturday Evening Post, November 5, 1932)
- "The Fiend" (Esquire, January 1935)
- "Babylon Revisited" (Saturday Evening Post, February 21, 1931)

== Reception ==
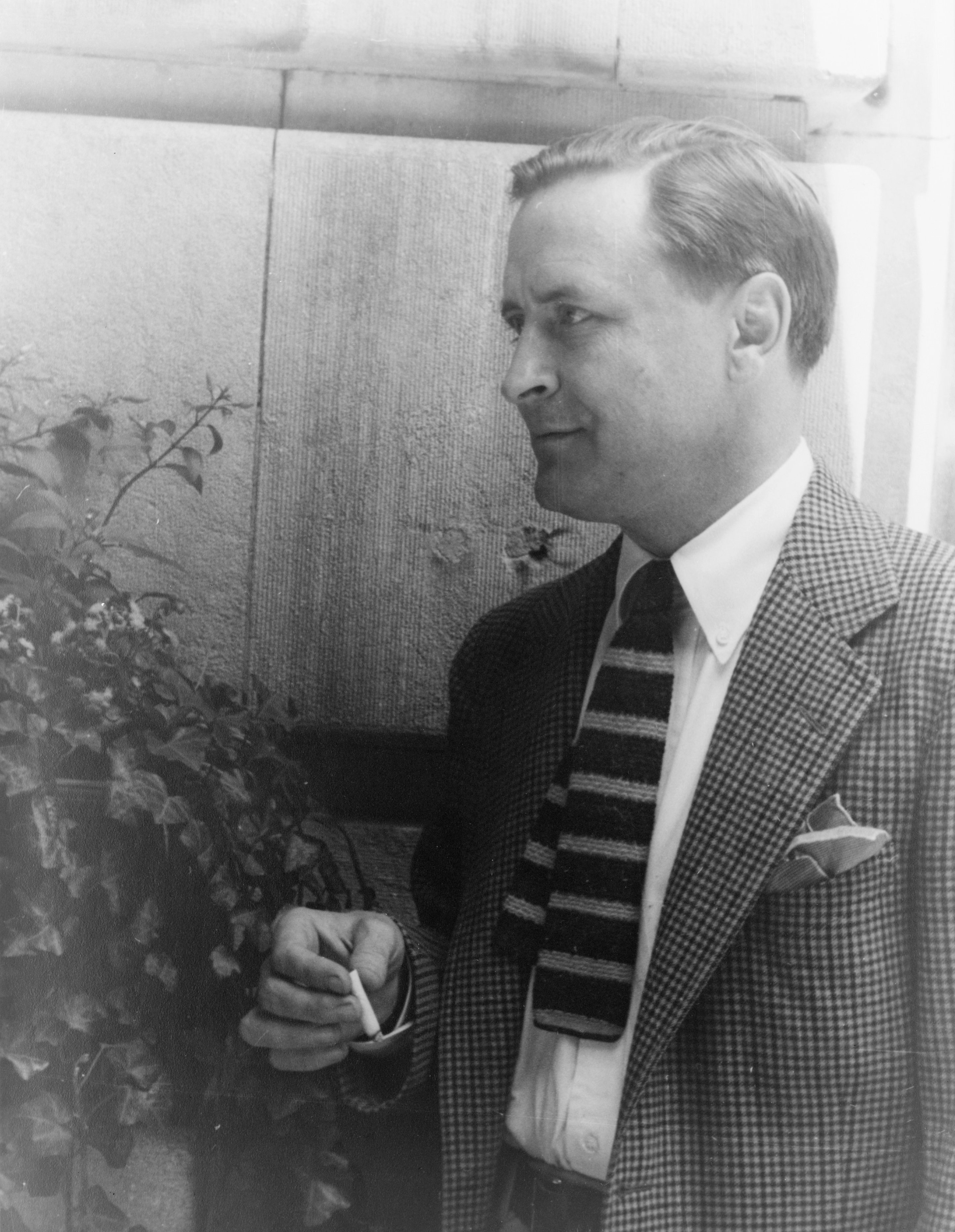
A middle-aged F. Scott Fitzgerald in 1937

In The New York Times, critic Edith Walton gave Fitzgerald's final collection a mixed reception. "The characteristic seal of his brilliance stamps the entire book, but it is a brilliance which splutters off too frequently into mere razzle-dazzle." Walton continues, "It has become a dreadful commonplace to say that Mr. Fitzgerald's material is rarely worthy of his talents. Unfortunately, however, the platitude represents truth. Scott Fitzgerald's mastery of style — swift, sure, polished, firm — is so complete that even his most trivial efforts are dignified by his technical competence. All his writing has a glamorous gloss upon it; it is always entertaining; it is always beautifully executed."

Literary critic John Kuehl reports that "the volume elicited mixed reviews and sold only a few thousand copies."

== Critical appraisal ==
Kuehl offers this assessment regarding the collection's popular and critical success: "Although Taps at Reveille does not cohere as well as other Scribner collections, it has generally been considered the best volume of Fitzgerald stories published during his lifetime."

On the stories featuring Fitzgerald's youthful alter ego, Basil Duke Lee, critic Kenneth Eble rates these "as excellent in craftsmanship as any Fitzgerald ever wrote."

== Themes ==
The thematic elements that informed Fitzgerald's fiction "apprentice works" of the late teens and early 1920s are revived in Taps at Reveille. The female protagonists from "The Ice Palace" and "The Jelly-Bean" reappear, as do their "themes and techniques."

According to literary critic and biographer John Kuehl, these devices include the "femme fatale/homme manque, rich girl/poor girl, first-person observer, 'North' vs. 'South', and Lost Youth.

== The Basil and Josephine stories ==
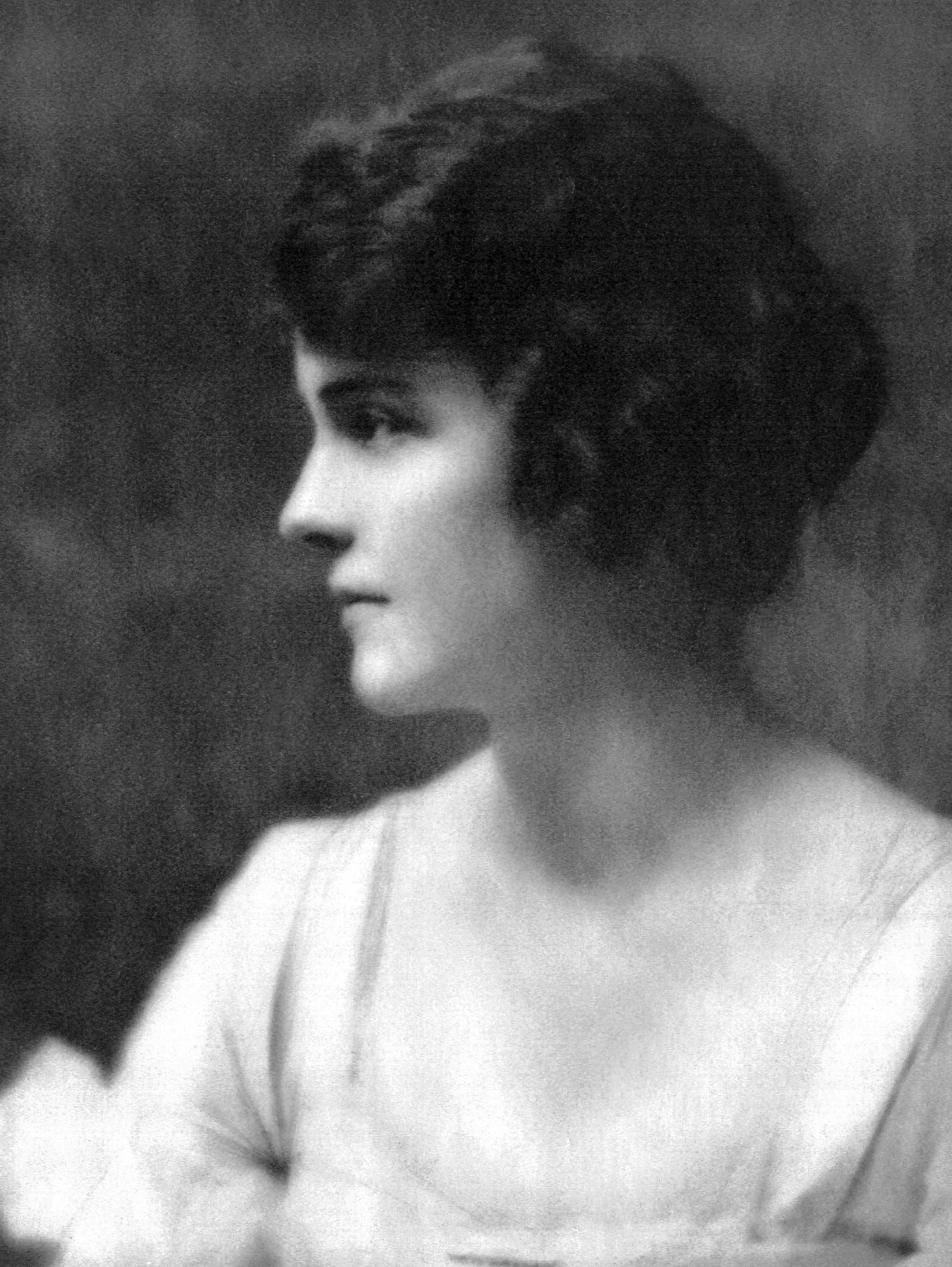
Fitzgerald based the Josephine Perry stories on his first love, Ginevra King.

Fitzgerald interrupted his work on his manuscript for his novel Tender is the Night (1936) to write the nine autobiographical Basil Duke Lee stories. The stories "capture with precision the emotions and attitudes of Fitzgerald's youth." The autobiographical elements of these stories are evident in the fictional details, which follow the male protagonist, Basil Duke Lee, from his childhood before entering boarding school in 1909 to his enrollment at Yale in 1913 — similar to Fitzgerald's trajectory from St. Paul Academy to Princeton during the same years.

Described as "sequential" narratives, eight of these were published by The Saturday Evening Post in 1928 and 1929. The ninth story "That Kind of Party" was rejected by Post and other journals and did not appear in print until summer 1951 in The Princeton University Library Chronicle. Fitzgerald conceived the Josephine stories as companion pieces to the successful Basil series. These works featured the character Josephine Perry, based upon Fitzgerald's first love while he was attending Princeton, Ginevra King. The Post published these in 1930 and 1931. Taps at Reveille includes three of the five "Josephine" Perry stories.

The Josephine stories are represented in five stories: "First Blood", "A Nice Quiet Place", "A Woman With a Past", "A Snobbish Story", and "Emotional Bankruptcy". All of these first appeared independently in The Saturday Evening Post. The first three of these were included in Taps at Reveille. Literary critic Kenneth Eble considers the Josephine stories a falling off from the foregoing Basil Duke Lee narratives:

The central character relies heavily on Fitzgerald's memory of Ginevra King…If she is less a successfully created character, as I think she is, it may be because Fitzgerald did not, could not, fully understand her or be as privy to her youthful feelings and experiences as he could with Basil.

As a literary creation, Josephine Perry is Fitzgerald's feminine ideal, whose infatuation with love is her paramount characteristic. Nonetheless, Fitzgerald endows her with a measure of credibility. In a letter to the Post editor Arthur Mizener, Mrs. Ginevra King Pirie offered this commentary on the accuracy of Fitzgerald's portrait of her as a girl:

I was too thoughtless in those days & too much in love with love to think of consequences. These things he has emphasized, and over-emphasized, in the Josephine stories: but it is only fair to say I asked for some of them.

Contrary to Fitzgerald's expectations that the recently published novel Tender is the Night would revive his reputation as an author of serious long fiction, sales for the novel, at 13,000 copies, were the poorest of all his major works. Fitzgerald remained known by his contemporary readership "as a popular writer who contributed stories like the Basil and Josephine series to the Post and other mass circulation magazines."
