= Babylon Revisited =

1931 short story by F. Scott Fitzgerald

- Short story by F. Scott Fitzgerald
- February 21, 1931 cover of the Saturday Evening Post
- Country: United States
- Language: English
- Genre: Short story

Publication
- Published in: The Saturday Evening Post collected in Taps at Reveille
- Publication type: Magazine; Short story collection
- Publisher: Scribner (book)
- Media type: Print
- Publication date: February 21, 1931

"Babylon Revisited" is a short story by F. Scott Fitzgerald, written in December 1930 and first published on February 21, 1931, in The Saturday Evening Post and inside The Telegraph, the following Saturday. It was later included in Fitzgerald's 1935 short story collection Taps at Reveille. Regarded by critics and scholars as among the author's greatest works, the story is set in the year after the stock market crash of 1929, heralding the end of an era that Fitzgerald referred to as the Jazz Age. Brief flashbacks take place in the Jazz Age. Also, it shows several references to the Great Depression and how the character had to adapt his life to it. Much of it is based on the author's own experiences. The short story will enter the American public domain on January 1, 2027. (Note: Under R231397)

== Background ==
Fitzgerald wrote the story in December 1930, drawing upon a true incident involving himself, his daughter Frances "Scottie" Fitzgerald, his sister-in-law Rosalind and her husband Newman Smith, on whom Marion and Lincoln Peters are based. Newman Smith was a banker based in Belgium, who was a colonel in the U.S. Army in World War II would be in charge of worldwide strategic deception for the U.S. Joint Chiefs of Staff.

Rosalind and Newman had not been able financially to live as well as Scott and Zelda had lived during the 1920s, and they had always regarded Scott as an irresponsible drunkard whose obsession with high living was responsible for Zelda's mental problems. When Zelda suffered a breakdown and was committed to a sanitarium in Switzerland, Rosalind felt that Scott was unfit to raise their daughter and that Rosalind and Newman should adopt her.

Like much of Fitzgerald's fiction, the story has autobiographical elements, reflecting his struggles with alcoholism, his wife's mental decline, and his role as a father. It serves as a companion to "One Trip Abroad," another tale exploring the impact of unearned wealth and expatriation on the American character.

== Plot ==
"I heard that you lost a lot in the crash."

"I did," and he added grimly, "but I lost everything I wanted in the boom."

— F. Scott Fitzgerald, Babylon Revisited

"Babylon Revisited" is split into five sections, and the short story begins with Charlie Wales sitting at Ritz Bar in Paris; he is having a conversation with the bartender, Alix. While in conversation with Alix, he inquires about his old friends with whom he used to drink and attend parties. He leaves the bartender with an address where his friends might be able to find him; later on he realizes that is a mistake.

In earlier years, Charlie Wales spent his days drinking and partying and seemed not to have a single care in the world. When the story is set, Charlie sees the world differently, as he is no longer consumed by the extravagant lifestyle of the 1920s he once lived. He was a frequent drinker and partygoer but now only allows himself to have one drink per day. He eventually leaves the bar and observes the streets of Paris with a sense of nostalgia now that the party days are over but also acknowledges how much his previous behavior and lifestyle have impacted his life in negative ways.

During the Jazz Age, Charlie had lost everything from money to his family. But he is now in Paris to reclaim his rights as a father to his daughter, Honoria, who is currently under the care of Charlie's sister-in-law, Marion Peters, and her husband, Lincoln Peters. Honoria is now in custody of her aunt Marion because her mother, Helen, had died during the party years, and Marion blames Charlie for the death of her sister. Charlie and Helen were frequent party goers, and as the story progresses, the reader learns that one night Charlie got angry about his wife kissing another man and left her out in the snow. The story indicates that while Honoria's mother might have had some issues with her heart, he also was recovering from alcoholism at a facility and their relationship might have been toxic.

Marion blames Charlie for her sister's death and constantly sees him as a bad person. The story reveals that she has a grudge against him because she hates that her sister and Charlie are out spending so much money on unnecessary partying while she and her husband, Lincoln, are barely getting by. He fears that Marion will put ideas in Honoria's head and turn his daughter against him because of her beliefs about him.

Charlie frequently lunches with his daughter and spends time with her at the Peters’ to show Marion that he is indeed a good father and to show her that his drunken party days are behind him. His main priority is his daughter, and he wants her to live with him in Prague. Honoria even begins to question him about why she is not living with him. Marion, seeing his efforts, has finally changed her mind and has decided to let Honoria live with her father.

The same afternoon, Charlie is at the Peters' home with his daughter, when suddenly there is someone at the door. On the other side are his old friends Duncan and Lorraine, whom he had asked the bartender Alix about. His friends are very obviously drunk and keep insisting that Charlie go to dinner with them; he turns down their offer twice, and they finally go away unhappy with him. Marion, observing this, after dinner completely withdraws her offer to let Charlie take his daughter back to Prague with him, for she fears he is not completely over his drunken days.

Charlie feels devastated and sees his efforts have gone down the drain. He goes back to the Ritz, thinking he would run into Lorraine and Duncan there but instead finding another bartender he knew well from his partying days. They have a short conversation, and Charlie continues to reminisce about his old partying days and all of the bad times in his marriage with Helen. He is consumed with thoughts about the 1920s, when people were so careless, drunk and on drugs all the time. After some time, he calls Lincoln and asks if he really can't take his daughter back with him. Lincoln informs him that he cannot because Marion is far too upset at what happened and that he is going to have to wait another six months to try to get his daughter back. Charlie, upset at Lincoln's response, goes back to the bar and sits. He feels trapped and broods over how much time will have to pass until Marion stops making him pay for his former lifestyle and mistakes. He keeps thinking and is certain Helen would want him to be with his daughter and not alone.

== List of characters ==
- Charles J. Wales – an American businessman and recovering alcoholic living in Prague, widower, who occasionally goes to Paris to see his daughter Honoria.
- Helen Wales – Charles's late wife
- Honoria Wales – 9-year-old daughter of Charles and Helen based on Frances "Scottie" Fitzgerald.
- Marion Peters – Charles's sister-in-law based on Zelda's sibling Rosalind Sayre Smith.
- Lincoln Peters – Marion's husband based on Rosalind's spouse Newman Smith.
- Duncan Scheaffer – old friend of Charles
- Lorraine Quarrels – old friend of Charles
- Alix – barman at the Ritz, Paris
- Elsie and Richard Peters – Honoria's cousins, children of Marion and Lincoln
- Mr Campbell, George Hardt, Snow Bird, Claude Fessenden – old friends of Charles, merely quoted in the story
- Paul – head barman at the Ritz, only quoted in the story

== Critical analysis ==
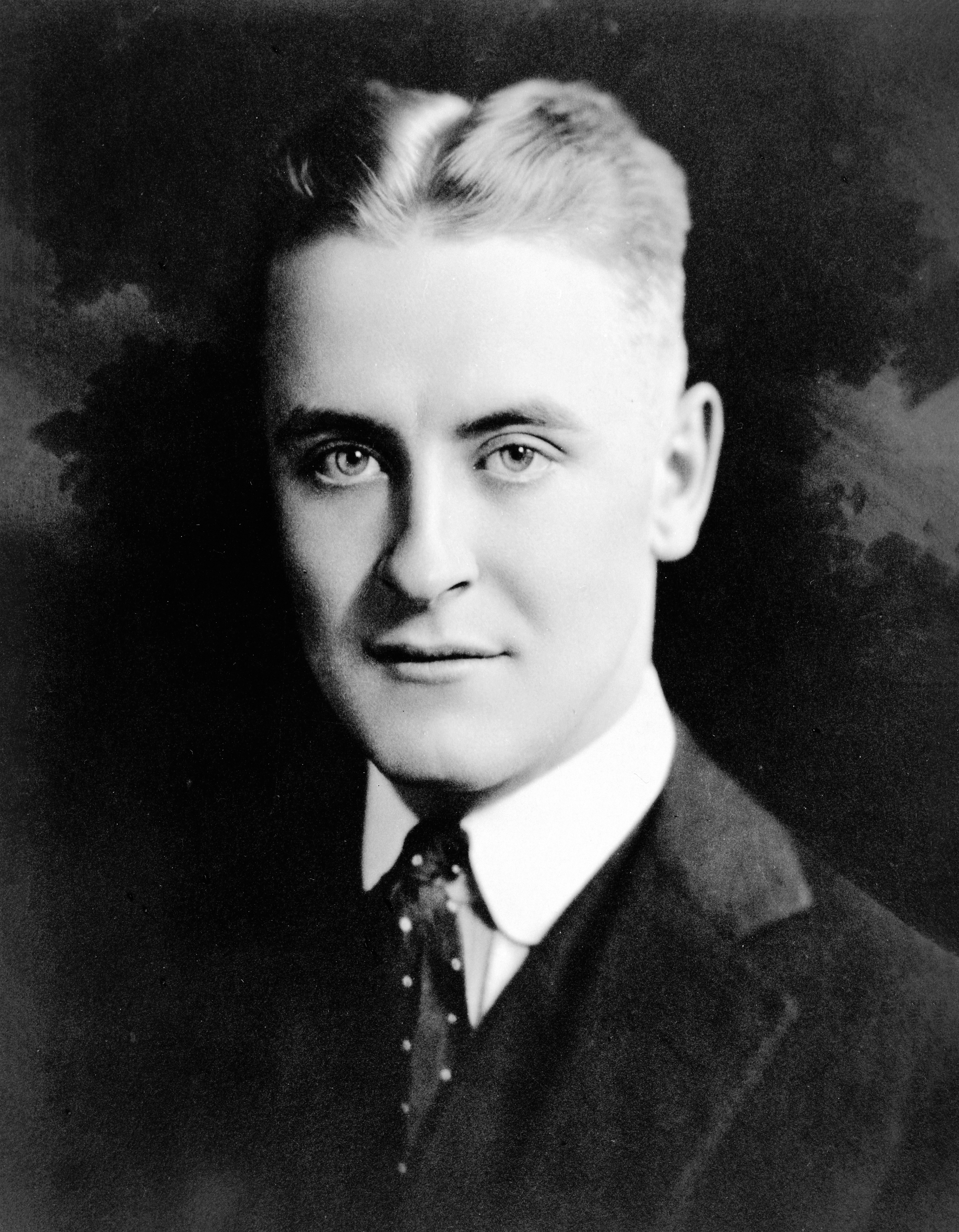
F. Scott Fitzgerald

=== Time ===
A major theme of the story is of time and the inevitability of past mistakes resurfacing. Due to Charlie's incapability to cope after the stock market crash, he tries to make up for all of the years that he missed out on during Honoria's childhood by proving his sobriety to his sister-in-law, Marion. Charlie recognizes the mistakes he made in the past that caused him to lose his daughter in the first place, and his constant longing for a future with her results in his past coming back to haunt him.

=== Dislocation and alienation ===
During the modernist literary movement during which this story was written, a common theme was that of dislocation and alienation. After losing his wife and then eventually his daughter, Charlie feels an overwhelming sense of loneliness. Following the Great Depression and the stock market crash, he is confronted with the consequences of his foolish and incautious past, causing him to find the motivation to win custody of his daughter to ease the pain of his miserable solitude.

=== Absurdity and guilt ===
Especially present in this story is the theme of absurdity and incongruity as well as immense guilt. Charlie made his life better for himself and then had his goals and dreams taken away from him by the failure to take his daughter back under his own wing. Charlie's past experiences caused him to fail in achieving Honoria's custody despite hard work and dedication to remaking himself to become a better person and a better father. He is burdened with guilt because of his past mistakes that caused him to lose his daughter, even though he made a valiant effort to rebuild his morale.

=== Hopefulness and disappointment ===
Throughout the story, Charlie builds an enormous amount of hope for the retrieval of his daughter. Charlie's euphoria continues to grow as he becomes more and more hopeful of this preferred outcome. At the end of the story, he is faced with the disappointment of losing this chance to rekindle the relationship between himself and his daughter.

== Adaptations ==
In March 1940, independent film producer Lester Cowan purchased the screen rights to "Babylon Revisited" for $1,000. Known for producing the 1940 film My Little Chickadee starring W. C. Fields and Mae West, Cowan planned to develop the film with Harry Cohn's Columbia Studios. Cowan hired F. Scott Fitzgerald to adapt the work at $500 per week, ultimately paying the struggling author a total of $5,000 (equivalent to $114,905 in 2025). Although this weekly salary fell well below Fitzgerald's usual studio rate, Cowan promised him a bonus if the film reached production.

Although initially wary of Cowan, Fitzgerald soon grew comfortable working with him, believing the producer respected his craft. Despite the lower pay, Fitzgerald devoted himself to the project, appreciating the chance to adapt one of his finest stories without outside interference. By August 1940, he completed his second draft, titled Cosmopolitan, and included an author's note warning that, like Rebecca or The Shop Around the Corner, the story should have no moral lessons whatsoever, leaving viewers to draw their own conclusions about the perils of excess in the Jazz Age.

After the author's death in December 1940, Fitzgerald's screenplay adaptation of "Babylon Revisited" failed to be produced, and Lester Cowan sold the screen rights to Metro-Goldwyn-Mayer. Fourteen years later, following the revival of Fitzgerald's popularity as an author, MGM hired Philip G. Epstein, Julius J. Epstein, and Richard Brooks to adapt the story for the 1954 film The Last Time I Saw Paris. Starring Van Johnson as Charles and Elizabeth Taylor as Helen, the setting was changed to post-World War II Paris and the main character of Charles turned into an aspiring novelist.

== See also ==
- Babylon Revisited and Other Stories
