= Here She Comes Now / Venus in Furs =

"Here She Comes Now/Venus in Furs"
- US picture sleeve

Single by Nirvana and Melvins

from the album Heaven & Hell – A Tribute to the Velvet Underground
- Released: June 1991
- Recorded: April 1990
- Studio: Smart Studios, Wisconsin
- Genre: Grunge; noise rock; alternative rock
- Length: 4:44 (Here She Comes Now); 3:07 (Venus in Furs)
- Label: Communion
- Songwriters: Lou Reed; John Cale; Sterling Morrison

Nirvana singles chronology
"Candy" / "Molly's Lips" (1991)	"Here She Comes Now" / "Venus in Furs" (1991)	"Smells Like Teen Spirit" (1991)

Melvins singles chronology
"Your Blessened" (1990)	"Here She Comes Now" / "Venus in Furs" (1991)	"Night Goat" (1992)

"Here She Comes Now"/"Venus in Furs" is a split single by American rock bands Nirvana and Melvins. It was released in June 1991 by The Communion Label.

The single features covers of two Velvet Underground songs: "Here She Comes Now" by Nirvana, and "Venus in Furs" by the Melvins. It was reportedly limited to 1000 copies, and available in an unknown number of colors believed to be as high as 20.

The cover art references the two Velvet Underground albums on which the songs respectively appeared, with the Melvins' side resembling the cover of the band's 1967 debut The Velvet Underground & Nico, and Nirvana's side resembling the cover of their 1968 second album, White Light/White Heat.

== Here She Comes Now ==
"Here She Comes Now" was recorded in April 1990 by Butch Vig at Smart Studios in Madison, Wisconsin. These sessions represented the band's initial attempts at recording a second album for their original label, Sub Pop, but this was abandoned after the band signed with DGC Records in late 1990, and instead recorded their breakthrough album, Nevermind, with Vig in May 1991. "Here She Comes Now" was one of several songs recorded during the Smart sessions in 1990 or 1991 which still saw official release, along with "Dive" (on the 1990 "Sliver" single), "In Bloom" (as a music video, on the 1991 home video Sub Pop Video Network Program) and "Polly" (on Nevermind).

"Here She Comes Now" had already been officially-released by the time the single was released, first appearing on the Communion compilation Heaven & Hell – A Tribute to The Velvet Underground earlier in 1991. It was re-released posthumously by DGC on the Nirvana box set, With the Lights Out, in November 2004, and on the 20th anniversary edition of Nevermind in September 2011.

"Here She Comes Now" occasionally appeared in the band's live set list in 1990 and 1991. A second studio version was recorded during a live, acoustic radio session in Hilversum, Netherlands on November 25, 1991. The session, which also includes a version of the American folk song "Where Did You Sleep Last Night" and two original songs, was recorded for the Dutch stations VPRO and VARA. This version of the song appears on numerous bootlegs, but remains officially unreleased.

== Venus in Furs ==
"Venus in Furs" was recorded at Razor's Edge Recording in San Francisco, California.

== Track listing ==
1. Nirvana: "Here She Comes Now" (John Cale, Sterling Morrison, Lou Reed)
2. Melvins: "Venus in Furs" (Reed)
