= Ozma (album) =

Studio album by The Melvins
- Released: November 1, 1989
- Recorded: May 1989
- Genres: Sludge metal; hardcore punk; grunge
- Length: 33:48
- Label: Boner
- Producer: Mark Deutrom

The Melvins chronology
Gluey Porch Treatments (1987)	Ozma (1989)	Your Choice Live Series Vol.12 (1991)

Singles from Ozma
- 1. "Oven" / "Revulsion"/"We Reach"" Released: 1989

Ozma is the second studio album by the Melvins, released in 1989 through Boner Records. It is the first Melvins album to feature Lori Black on bass guitar and was recorded when the band relocated to San Francisco.

== Background and release ==
"Love Thing" is a cover of the Kiss song "Love Theme from KISS" from their eponymous debut album. "Creepy Smell" begins with the intro to the song "Living In Sin" from Gene Simmons' solo album. "Candy-O" is originally by the Cars and was a bonus track on the cassette and CD editions.

The title refers to the character Princess Ozma from the Oz series of books.

The CD version includes the entire Gluey Porch Treatments album. The track listing that is printed on the CD lists 34 tracks, but the CD only has 33 tracks. This is due to "Exact Paperbacks" and "Happy Grey or Black" being mistakenly combined on track 23 and not split into separate tracks as credited.

The album's cover art was drawn by Spazz bassist and owner of Slap-a-Ham Records, Chris Dodge.

== Critical reception ==
Professional ratings
Review scores
Source	Rating
AllMusic	4/5 stars

AllMusic critic Ned Raggett wrote: "The genre-dipping and out-of-nowhere efforts of later years were still some distance off, to be sure, but moments like the vocal/drum-only part on "Oven" and the needle-thin feedback treatment punctuating "Revulsion/We Reach" (along with occasional chimes) show more chances already being taken." Ira Robbins of Trouser Press described the record as "an outpouring of overweight weirdness cut into short slices".

The album was included in Revolver magazine's list of "10 Grunge Albums You Need to Own", and was described as "a bestial metal-punk hybrid that's lumbering, ponderous, and completely frightening."

== Track listing ==
All tracks are written by Buzz Osborne, except where noted.

Side one
No.	Title	Length
1.	"Vile"	3:47
2.	"Oven"	1:28
3.	"At a Crawl"	2:46
4.	"Let God Be Your Gardener"	1:52
5.	"Creepy Smell"	2:04
6.	"Kool Legged"	2:48
7.	"Green Honey"	1:13
8.	"Agonizer"	1:40
Total length:		17:38

Side two
No.	Title	Writer(s)	Length
1.	"Raise a Paw"		1:11
2.	"Love Thing" (Kiss cover)	Peter Criss, Ace Frehley, Gene Simmons, Paul Stanley	1:17
3.	"Ever Since My Accident"		1:30
4.	"Revulsion/We Reach"		6:21
5.	"Dead Dressed"		2:07
6.	"Cranky Messiah"		1:25
7.	"Claude"		1:15
8.	"My Small Percent Shows Most"		0:58
Total length:			16:04

CD/cassette bonus track
No.	Title	Writer(s)	Length
17.	"Candy-O" (The Cars cover)	Ric Ocasek	1:27

== Personnel ==
Melvins

- Buzz – vocals, guitar
- Lori – bass
- Dale – drums, backing vocals

Additional personnel

- Mark Deutrom – producer
- Joshua Roberts – engineer
- Chris Dodge – cover art
