= The Ice Palace (short story) =

1920 short story by F. Scott Fitzgerald

- Short story by F. Scott Fitzgerald
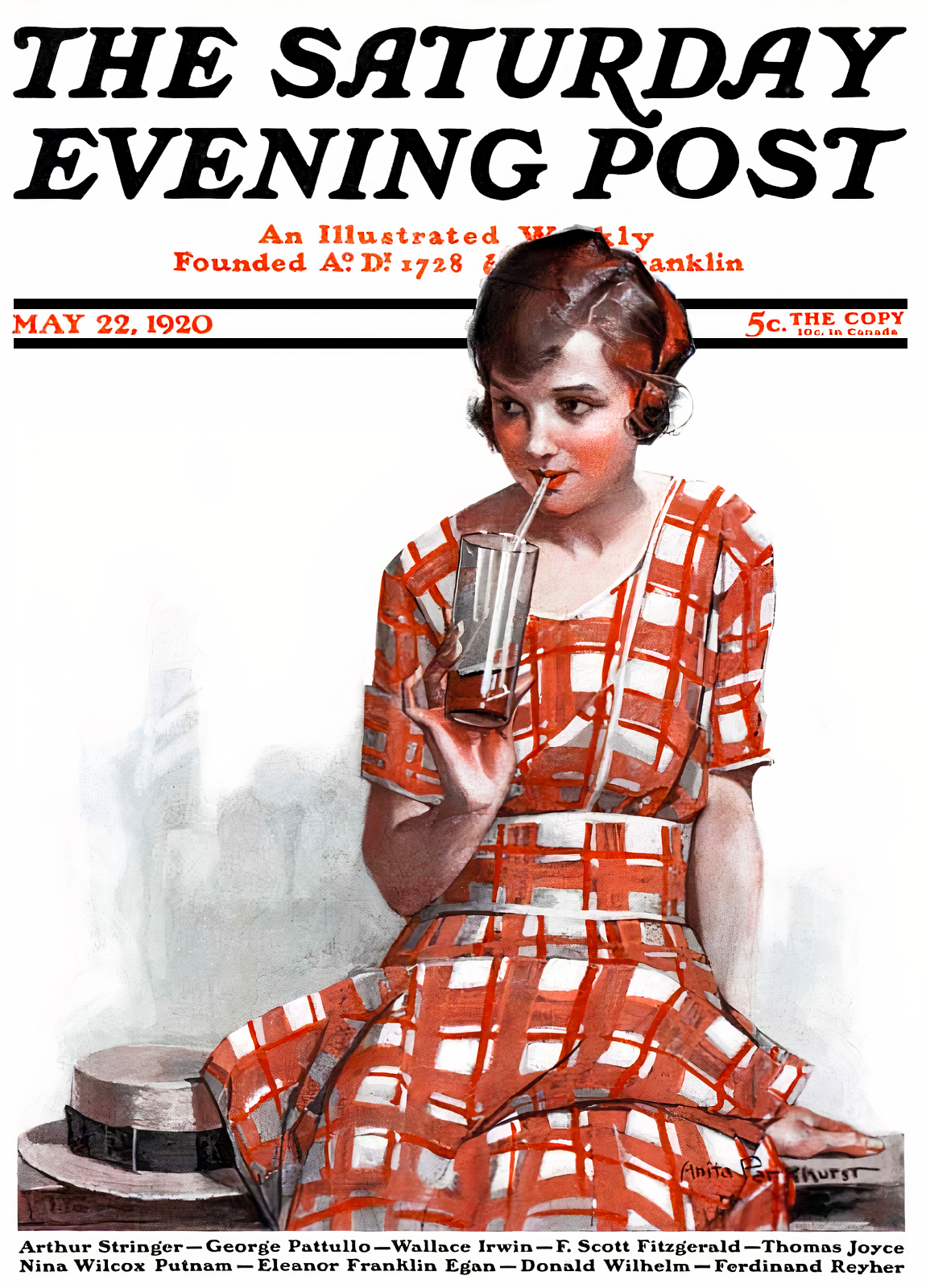
- May 22, 1920 cover of the Saturday Evening Post

Text available at Wikisource
- Country: United States
- Language: English
- Genre: Short story

Publication
- Published in: Saturday Evening Post
- Publication type: Periodical
- Publisher: Curtis Publishing Company
- Media type: Print (magazine, hardback, and paperback)
- Publication date: May 22, 1920

"The Ice Palace" is a modernist short story written by F. Scott Fitzgerald and published in The Saturday Evening Post on May 22, 1920. It is one of eight short stories originally published in Fitzgerald's first collection, Flappers and Philosophers (New York City: Charles Scribner's Sons, 1920), and is included in the collection Babylon Revisited and Other Stories (New York City: Charles Scribner's Sons, 1960).

== Plot ==
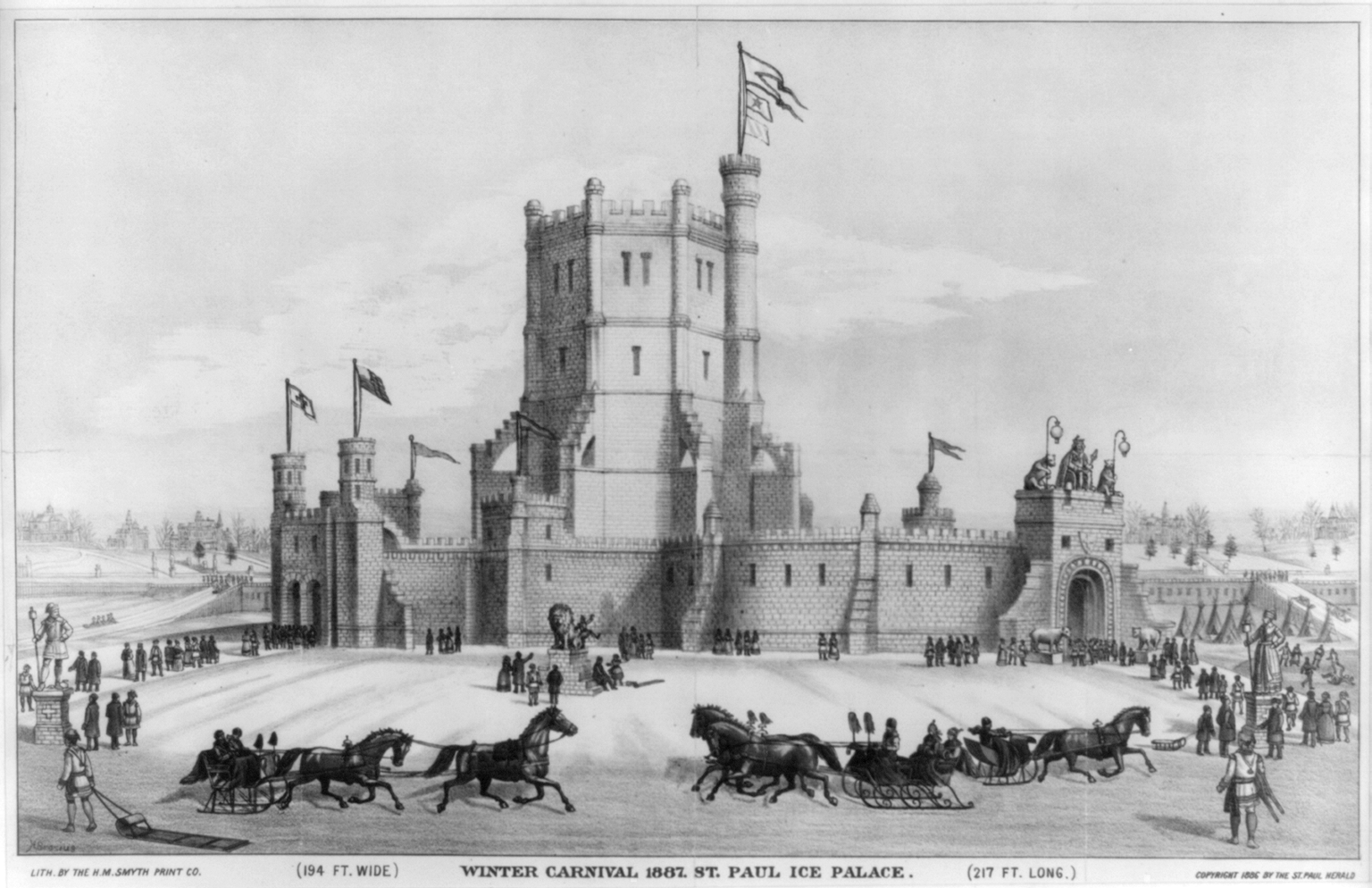
St. Paul Ice Palace, 1887

Sally Carrol Happer, a young woman from the fictional city of Tarleton, Georgia, United States of America, is bored with her unchanging environment. Her local friends are dismayed to learn she is engaged to Harry Bellamy, a man from an unspecified town in the northern United States of America. She brushes off their concerns, alluding to her need for something more in her life, a need to see "things happen on a big scale."

Sally Carrol travels to the north during the winter to visit Harry's home town and meet his family. The winter weather underscores her growing disillusionment with the decision to move north, until her moment of epiphany in the town's local ice palace. In the end, Sally Carrol returns home.

== Background ==
The ice palace referenced in the story is based on one that appeared at the 1887 St. Paul, Minnesota, Winter Carnival. A native of the city, Fitzgerald probably heard of the structure during his childhood. The ice labyrinth contained in the bottom floor of the palace appeared as part of the 1888 Ice Palace.

F. Scott Fitzgerald traced the origins of the story to events that occurred in 1920. The first was the despairing remark of an unidentified girl he met in St. Paul, Minnesota:

"Here comes the winter," she said as a scattering of confetti-like snow blew along the street. I thought immediately of the winters I had known there, their bleakness and dreariness and seemingly endless length…

The second was an exchange he had with his future spouse, Zelda Sayre, while visiting Montgomery, Alabama. During the early months of their courtship, Zelda and Scott strolled through the Confederate Cemetery at Oakwood Cemetery. While walking past the headstones, Scott ostensibly failed to show sufficient reverence, and Zelda informed Scott that he would never understand how she felt about the Confederate dead. Scott wrote:

She told me I would never understand how she felt about the Confederate graves, and I told her I understood so well that I could put it on paper. Next day on my way back to St. Paul, it came to me that it was all one story.

Scott drew on Zelda's intense feelings about the Confederate States of America and the South for his short story about a Southern girl who becomes lost in an ice maze while visiting a northern town. Whereas F. Scott Fitzgerald denigrated his family's Confederate relatives such as Mary Surratt and mocked the Sayre family's intense devotion to the Confederacy, Zelda described herself as "a Typhoid Mary of Confederate tradition".

Friction between Zelda and Scott regarding the South resurfaced in February 1921 during Zelda's pregnancy. She requested that the child be born on Southern soil in Alabama, but Fitzgerald refused. Zelda wrote to a friend: "Scott's changed... He used... to say he loved the South, but now he wants to get as far away from it as he can." To her dismay, Scott insisted upon having their baby on northern soil in St. Paul.

== Critical analysis ==
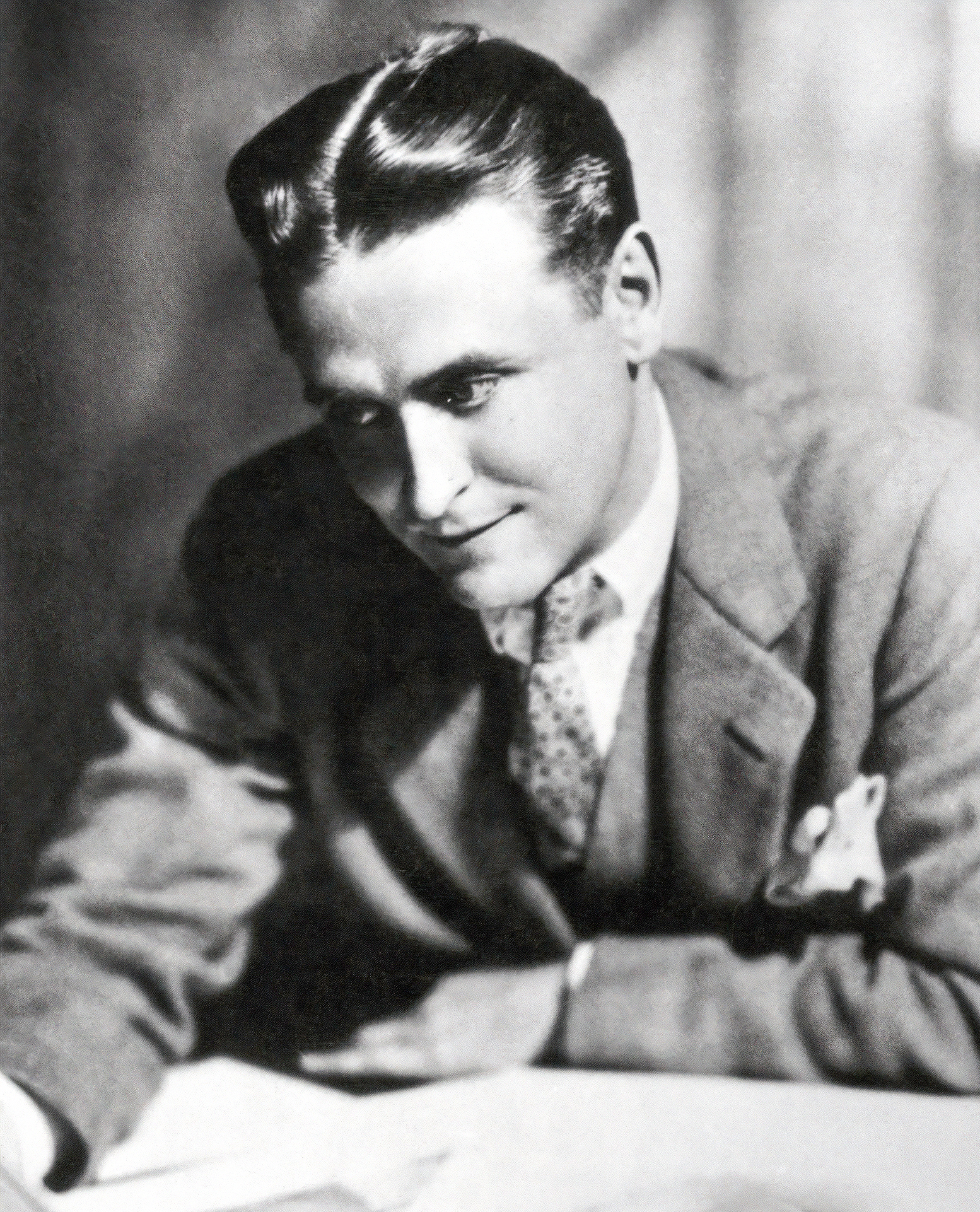
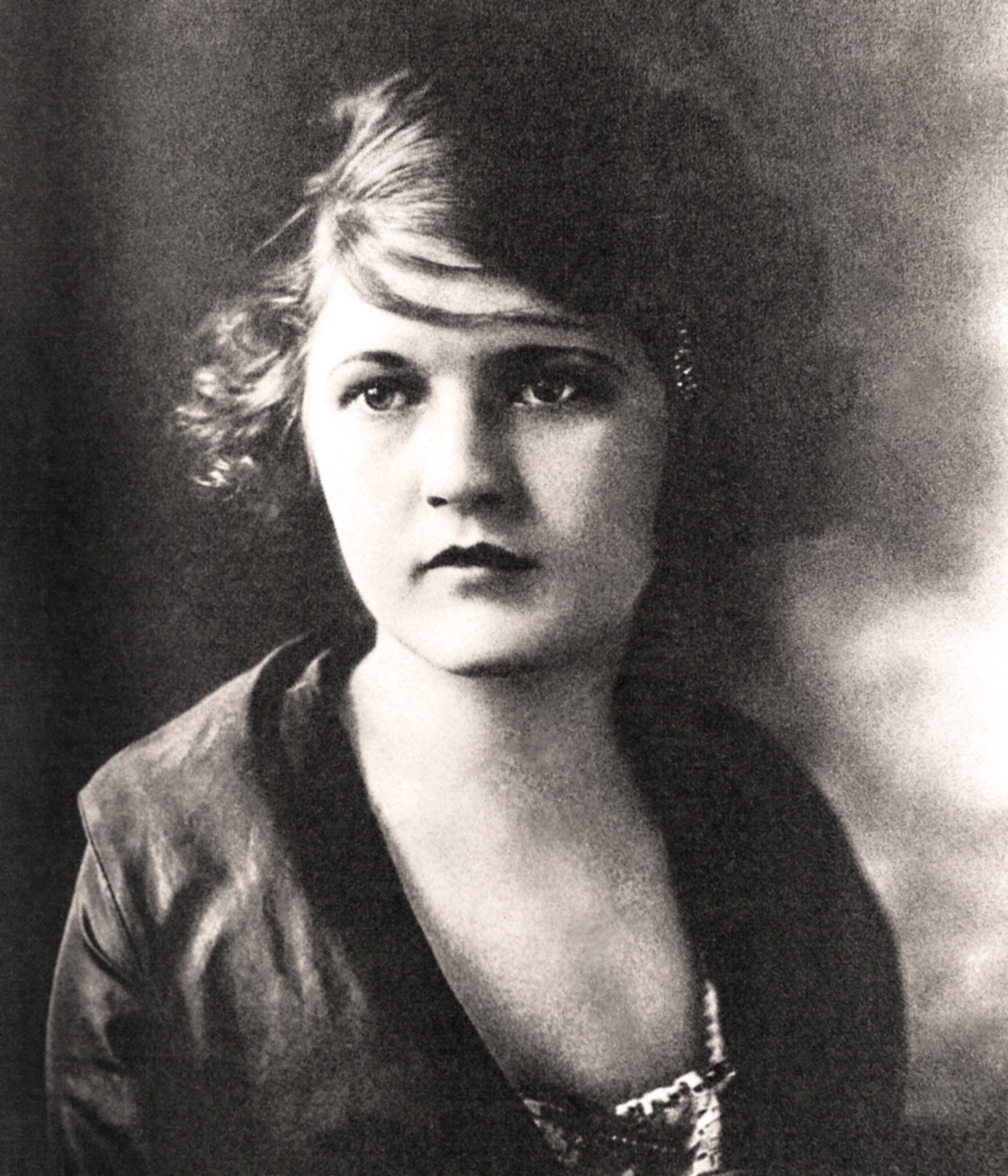
F. Scott Fitzgerald and Zelda Fitzgerald

The Ice Palace represents Fitzgerald's most successful handling of two contrasting settings that serve to "unify and intensify" the story. The contradictions that emerge in his portrayal of Northern and Southern social relationships present them as mutually exclusive, dramatizing "a clash between two cultures, temperaments, and histories."

Biographer Kenneth E. Eble points out that "The Ice Palace" is not limited to examining the South alone, and by inference, his strained relationship with his spouse Zelda Sayre, a Montgomery, Alabama raised Southern belle. Eble writes:

Perhaps the reason "The Ice Palace" is so successful is that Fitzgerald [examined] the warring strains in his own background: the potato-famine Irish and his Maryland colonial ancestry; the provincial and the Princetonian; poverty, cold and control [vs.] richness, ripeness and passion.

Eble considers "The Ice Palace" "as good a story as Fitzgerald ever wrote…clearly the best story" in his 1920 collection Flappers and Philosophers.

Of Fitzgerald's three tales that treat the topic of "Southern women"—including "The Jelly-Bean" (1920) and "Last of the Southern Belles" (1929)—literary critic John Kuehl reports that "neither of these matches ’The Ice Palace’ for complexity...his first trenchant exploration of the north–south antithesis."

== Sequel ==
Fitzgerald later wrote another short story, "The Jelly-Bean", which was published in the 1922 collection Tales of the Jazz Age. A sequel to "The Ice Palace", it returned to Tarleton with several references to many of the characters in the earlier work.
