= Best of Steel Pole Bath Tub =

Compilation album by Steel Pole Bath Tub
- Released: 1993
- Recorded: February 11, 1989 – January 14, 1992
- Studio: Various: The Compound; (San Francisco, CA); Poolside Studios; (San Francisco, CA); Razor's Edge Recording; (San Francisco, CA)
- Genre: Noise rock
- Length: 73:25
- Label: Sento
- Producer: Eric Holland, Steel Pole Bath Tub

Steel Pole Bath Tub chronology
Your Choice Live Series 019 (1993)	Best of Steel Pole Bath Tub (1993)	Some Cocktail Suggestions (1994)

Best of Steel Pole Bath Tub is a greatest hits compilation by Steel Pole Bath Tub, released in 1993 by Sento.

== Track listing ==
All tracks are written by Steel Pole Bath Tub, except "Paranoid", "Venus in Furs" and "I Dreamed I Dream".

No.	Title	From the album (date)	Length
1.	"Hey Bo Diddley"	Butterfly Love (1989)	3:12
2.	"Paranoid" (Black Sabbath cover)	Lurch (1990)	2:22
3.	"Soul Cannon"	Tulip (1991)	4:12
4.	"Arizona Garbage Truck"	Arizona Garbage Truck 7" (1990)	4:45
5.	"Venus in Furs" (Velvet Underground cover)	Venus in Furs/European Son 7" (1991)	4:14
6.	"One Thick Second"	Tulip (1991)	1:42
7.	"Swerve"	Butterfly Love (1989)	3:15
8.	"Christina"	Lurch (1990)	8:45
9.	"I Dreamed I Dream" (Sonic Youth cover)	Sweet Young Thing Ain't Sweet No More/I Dreamed I Dream (1990)	5:22
10.	"Mercurochrome"	Tulip (1991)	5:11
11.	"Wonders of Dust"	Tulip (1991)	2:12
12.	"The Scarlet"	Tulip (1991)	5:18
13.	"Welcome Aboard It's Love"	Butterfly Love (1989)	3:09
14.	"Bee Sting"	Butterfly Love (1989)	5:10
15.	"Myrna Loy"	Tulip (1991)	3:36
16.	"Lime Away"	Lurch (1990)	5:33
17.	"Borstal"	Bozeman/Borstal (1992)	4:48

== Personnel ==
Adapted from the Best of Steel Pole Bath Tub liner notes.

Steel Pole Bath Tub

- Dale Flattum – bass guitar, vocals
- Mike Morasky – guitar, vocals
- Darren Morey (as D.K. Mor-X) – drums, vocals

Production and additional personnel

- Jonathan Burnside – engineering (1, 2, 4, 5, 7–9, 13, 14, 16)
- Owen Connell – cover art, illustrations
- Eric Holland – production and engineering (3, 6, 10–12, 15)
- Masahiko Ohno – design, art direction
- Steel Pole Bath Tub – production

== Release history ==
Region	Date	Label	Format	Catalog
Japan	1993	Sento	CD	SENTO YU-2
