= DUH (band) =

American rock supergroup

- Origin: San Francisco, California, United States
- Genres: Noise rock, alternative rock
- Years active: 1990–1995
- Labels: Boner, Alternative Tentacles
- Past members: Dustin Donaldson; Chris Dodge; Tom Flynn; Gary Held; Sean Kelly; Dean Menta; Bob McDonald; Mike Morasky; Greg Werckman

DUH (Death's Ugly Head) was a San Francisco-based alternative and noise rock supergroup. The band comprised an ever-rotating line-up that featured members of Steel Pole Bath Tub, Faith No More, Models, Fang, Milk Cult, Phantom 309, Pansy Division and Despise You.

== History ==
DUH was founded in 1990 by Tom Flynn, Gary Held, Bob McDonald, and Mike Morasky. Morasky and Flynn had been long active in the California underground punk scene and were founding members of Steel Pole Bath Tub and Fang respectively. Held was a record label owner, having founded Communion Label, Revolver USA and Tupelo Recording Company, and had performed with Phantom 309. McDonald had been the lead vocalist of the Denver-based punk band Bum Kon before moving to California. Most of the band knew each other from their association with Boner Records. In 1991 they issued their debut album, titled Blowhard, on Boner Records. After performing a handful of live shows, DUH dispersed in late 1992 and its members returned to their respective projects.

Because the band was originally conceived as a one-off, DUH remained inactive for several years. In 1995, Boner Records released an album titled Jello Biafra With Plainfield. Intended as a prank, the record was issued with the Alternative Tentacles label printed on it and claimed to feature music by the band Plainsfield and vocals by Dead Kennedys vocalist Jello Biafra, although it was actually Grux from Caroliner Rainbow. In retaliation, Alternative Tentacles enlisted musicians Sean Kelly, Greg Werckman, Dustin Donaldson, Dean Menta and Chris Dodge to record an album under the name DUH. This line-up released the album The Unholy Handjob in 1995 for Alternative Tentacles and featured a more alternative metal-influenced sound. The group performed a handful of live shows and opened for L7.

After the second incarnation of DUH disbanded, guitarist Dean Menta was recruited by Faith No More to perform with them during their King for a Day Tour. Vocalist Greg Werckman later co-founded Ipecac Recordings with Faith No More/Mr. Bungle frontman Mike Patton.

== Discography ==
- Blowhard (Boner Records, 1991)
- The Unholy Handjob (Alternative Tentacles, 1995)
