= Blowhard (album) =

Studio album by DUH
- Released: 1991
- Studio: Poolside Studios (San Francisco, CA)
- Genre: Noise rock, sludge metal
- Length: 35:01
- Label: Boner
- Producer: Floyd Holland, The Warlock Pinchers

DUH chronology
Blowhard (1991)	The Unholy Handjob (1995)

Blowhard is the debut studio album of DUH, released in 1991 by Boner Records.

== Reception ==
Professional ratings
Review scores
Source	Rating
AllMusic	4/5 stars

Ned Raggett of AllMusic wrote an enthusiastic review and awarded Blowhard four out of five stars, saying it "kicks up a rough, aggressively produced stink" and "guitars and bass both show the expected in-your-face, heavily produced crunch from said band, artily aggressive and all the better for it."

== Track listing ==
All tracks are written by Tom Flynn, Gary Held, Bob McDonald and Mike Morasky.

No.	Title	Length
1.	"Spaghetti and Red Wine"	2:30
2.	"Transformer"	2:17
3.	"Solo Hanneman"	0:10
4.	"The Second Coming of Mike"	2:19
5.	"Tugboat Anchor"	3:09
6.	"Hex"	4:05
7.	"Mr. Mud"	3:04
8.	"Hot Day for the Ice Cream Man"	4:16
9.	"Brick Catcher"	3:22
10.	"Solo King"	0:06
11.	"Dim Bulb"	2:35
12.	"Wiley Coyote"	3:42
13.	"And She Said"	3:26

== Personnel ==
Adapted from the Blowhard liner notes.

DUH

- Tom Flynn – Dobro, banjo, pedal steel guitar, backing vocals, harmonica (11)
- Gary Held (as Herr Gustav) – sampler, drum programming, percussion
- Bob McDonald (as El Bobo) – vocals
- Mike Morasky (as Mike Morasshole) – bass guitar, backing vocals

Additional musicians

- Dale Flattum (as Flathead) – bass guitar (3, 10)

Production and design

- Floyd Holland – production
- Tricia Keightley – illustrations
- The Warlock Pinchers – production
- Harvey Bennett Stafford – illustrations

== Release history ==
Region	Date	Label	Format	Catalog
United States	1991	Boner	CD, CS, LP	BR29
