= Lurch/Butterfly Love =

Compilation album by Steel Pole Bath Tub
- Released: 1990
- Recorded: 1989–1990
- Genre: Noise rock
- Length: 60:06
- Label: Boner
- Producer: Steel Pole Bath Tub

Steel Pole Bath Tub chronology
Lurch (1990)	Lurch/Butterfly Love (1990)	Tulip (1991)

Professional ratings
Review scores
Source	Rating
Allmusic	3/5 stars

Lurch/Butterfly Love is a compilation album by Steel Pole Bath Tub, released in 1990 by Boner Records.

== Track listing ==
All tracks are written by Steel Pole Bath Tub, except "Paranoid" by Black Sabbath.

Lurch
No.	Title	Length
1.	"Christina"	8:45
2.	"Lime-Away"	5:35
3.	"Hey You"	6:15
4.	"The River"	4:45
5.	"Paranoid"	2:25

Butterfly Love
No.	Title	Length
6.	"Time to Die"	3:39
7.	"I Am Sam I Am"	2:45
8.	"Welcome Aboard It's Love"	3:09
9.	"Bee Sting"	5:12
10.	"Hey Bo Diddley"	2:55
11.	"Swerve"	3:15
12.	"Thru the Windshield of Love"	1:58
13.	"Heaven on Dirt"	6:39
14.	"Tear It Apart"	2:49

== Personnel ==
Adapted from the Butterfly Love liner notes.

Steel Pole Bath Tub

- Dale Flattum – bass guitar, sampler, vocals
- Mike Morasky – guitar, tape, vocals
- Darren Morey (as D.K. Mor-X) – drums

Production and additional personnel

- Steel Pole Bath Tub – production
