= Some Cocktail Suggestions =

EP by Steel Pole Bath Tub
- Released: November 8, 1994
- Recorded: August 1993 in Chicago, IL
- Genre: Noise rock
- Length: 25:25
- Label: Boner
- Producer: Steve Albini

Steel Pole Bath Tub chronology
Best of Steel Pole Bath Tub (1993)	Some Cocktail Suggestions (1994)	Scars from Falling Down (1995)

Some Cocktail Suggestions is an EP by Steel Pole Bath Tub, released on November 8, 1994 by Boner Records.

== Track listing ==
All tracks are written by Steel Pole Bath Tub.

No.	Title	Length
1.	"Ray"	6:08
2.	"The Living End"	3:25
3.	"Slip"	2:30
4.	"Hit It"	3:43
5.	"Speakerphone"	4:35
6.	"The Wasp Jar"	5:04

== Personnel ==
Adapted from the Some Cocktail Suggestions liner notes.

Steel Pole Bath Tub

- Dale Flattum – bass guitar, vocals
- Mike Morasky – guitar, vocals
- Darren Morey (as D.K. Mor-X) – drums, vocals

Additional musicians

- Paul Reller – saxophone

Production and additional personnel

- Steve Albini – production, engineering

== Release history ==
Region	Date	Label	Format	Catalog
United States	1994	Boner	CD, CS, LP	BR42
United States	1994	Tupelo	CD, CS, LP	TUP51
