= Dustin Donaldson =

- Also known as: Shitty Bicker
- Born: Dustin Thomas Donaldson; April 11, 1969 (age 56); Kalamazoo, Michigan, US
- Instruments: Drums, Synths, Vocals
- Years active: 1983-present
- Member of: I Am Spoonbender
- Formerly of: Thought Industry, Pansy Division, DUH
- Partner: Robynn Iwata (1995-present)

Dustin Thomas Donaldson (born April 11, 1969 in Kalamazoo, Michigan) is an American musician. He is best known for his work in Thought Industry and I Am Spoonbender.

== Early life ==
Donaldson was born in Kalamazoo and spent a majority of his childhood in Athens, Michigan. His parents were Jehovah's Witnesses. He picked up drumming at the age of fourteen or fifteen.

== Career ==
=== Thought Industry ===
While in high school, Donaldson would form numerous bands with childhood friends Dan Roe and Brent Oberlin. One of these bands, Desacrator [sic] released a demo tape titled 111MZD in 1988. Desacrator's name was changed to Thought Industry, another demo tape was released in 1990. Donaldson managed to get the group signed to Metal Blade Records by way of handing the tape over to Jason Newsted. The band opened for Skinny Puppy in 1992 and Type O Negative in 1994. Donaldson was fired from the band in late 1994 due to creative differences and was replaced with Jared Bryant.

=== Pansy Division ===
After moving to San Francisco from Kalamazoo, Donaldson joined Pansy Division in January 1995 after being recommended to band members Jon Ginoli and Chris Freeman by a mutual friend. While in the band, he would become somewhat controversial for things he would do on-stage during live performances, such as getting completely naked. The band recorded one album, Wish I'd Taken Pictures, and two EPs, Valentine's Day and For Those About to Suck Cock... We Salute You with him. Donaldson was fired from the band in October 1996 due to conflicts with Ginoli.

=== I Am Spoonbender ===
In 1997, Donaldson teamed up with long-time friend Brian Jackson to record I Am Spoonbender's first studio album Sender/Receiver. Halfway through this recording, Robynn Iwata would join the group under the moniker "Cup". Marc Kate was also added to the lineup sometime after the album's recording but before its release. The band would release two more EPs, Teletwin in 1999 and Shown Actual Size in 2002. I Am Spoonbender would then self-release their second studio album Buy Hidden Persuaders in 2006.

== Personal life ==
Despite his stint with queercore band Pansy Division in the mid-1990s, Donaldson has identified himself as heterosexual. He met his current partner Robynn Iwata in 1995 while Pansy Division and cub were touring together.

== Other Work ==
=== Film ===
Donaldson was briefly featured in the 1996 documentary Queercore: A Punk-U-Mentary alongside Pansy Division, though not interviewed or credited. He appeared as an actor in Jon Moritsugu's 2002 film Scumrock.

=== Journalism ===
Donaldson has written articles for Chunklet Magazine, including an interview with Will Cullen Hart of The Olivia Tremor Control in 2000.

=== Archaeology ===
Donaldson first traveled to Egypt in April 2008 with Robert Bauval as a research project for I Am Spoonbender's third studio album. He and Iwata claim to have discovered spring and fall equinox solar alignments in Timasirayn Temple and Amun Oracle.

== Discography ==
=== Albums ===
- Songs for Insects on Metal Blade Records (1992)
- Mods Carve the Pig: Assassins, Toads and God's Flesh on Metal Blade Records (1993)
- The Unholy Handjob on Alternative Tentacles (1995)
- Wish I'd Taken Pictures on Lookout! Records (1996)
- Sender/Receiver on Gold Standard Laboratories (1998)
- Buy Hidden Persuaders on Mesmer Detector Ltd (2006)

=== Singles ===
- "Gelatin" b/w "Metal" and "Nnnon" on Metal Blade Records (1993)
- "Valentine's Day" b/w "He Could Be The One" and "Pretty Boy (What's Your Name?)" on Lookout! Records (1995)
- For Those About to Suck Cock... We Salute You on Lookout! Records (1996)
- "Plastic Lips" b/w "Mr. Right" on Contact Records (1999)
- Teletwin on Gold Standard Laboratories (2000)
- Shown Actual Size on Gold Standard Laboratories (2002)

=== Compilations ===
- More Lovin' From Our Oven on Lookout! Records (1997)
- Recruited To Do Good Deeds For The Devil on Metal Blade Records (1998)
- The Essential Pansy Division on Alternative Tentacles (2006)
