= The Miracle of Sound in Motion =

Studio album by Steel Pole Bath Tub
- Released: May 10, 1993
- Genre: Noise rock
- Length: 41:34
- Label: Boner
- Producer: Eric Holland, Steel Pole Bath Tub

Steel Pole Bath Tub chronology
Tulip (1991)	The Miracle of Sound in Motion (1993)	Your Choice Live Series 019 (1993)

Professional ratings
Review scores
Source	Rating
Allmusic	4/5 stars

The Miracle of Sound in Motion is the third studio album by Steel Pole Bath Tub, released on May 10, 1993 by Boner Records.

== Reception ==
AllMusic gave the album four stars out of five.

== Track listing ==
No.	Title	Writer(s)	Length
1.	"Pseudoephedrine Hydrochloride"	Dale Flattum	5:26
2.	"Train to Miami"	Mike Morasky	4:46
3.	"Exhale"	Darren Morey	4:09
4.	"Thumbnail"	Mike Morasky	4:48
5.	"Down All the Days" (Pogues cover)	Shane MacGowan	3:43
6.	"Carbon"	Dale Flattum, Darren Morey	3:59
7.	"Bozeman"	Mike Morasky	2:57
8.	"Borstal"	Dale Flattum	4:42
9.	"594"	Darren Morey	4:06
10.	"Waxl"		2:58

== Personnel ==
Adapted from The Miracle of Sound in Motion liner notes.

Steel Pole Bath Tub

- Dale Flattum – bass guitar, vocals
- Mike Morasky – guitar, sampler, vocals
- Darren Morey (as D.K. Mor-X) – drums, piano, vocals

Additional musicians

- Tom Flynn – guitar
- T. W. Pain – backing vocals
- Alicia J. Rose – accordion
- Mia Doi Todd – mandolin

Production and additional personnel

- Eric Holland – production, engineering
- George Horn – mastering
- Burt Portnoy – illustrations
- Sam Suliman – design

== Release history ==
Region	Date	Label	Format	Catalog
United States	1993	Boner	CD, CS, LP	BR39
United States	1993	Tupelo	CD, CS, LP	TUP47
