= Joe Preston (EP) =

EP by Melvins (Joe Preston)
- Released: August 1992
- Recorded: 1991
- Genre: Sludge metal, drone metal, instrumental rock, noise rock
- Length: 27:36
- Label: Boner
- Producer: Jeff Brangley

Melvins (Joe Preston) chronology
Dale Crover (1992)	Joe Preston (1992)	Lysol (1992)

Professional ratings
Review scores
Source	Rating
AllMusic	2/5 stars

Joe Preston is an EP by then-Melvins bassist Joe Preston, released in 1992 through Boner Records.

While three names appear among the EPs personnel, Preston is likely the only musician on the record, the other two credited performers being pseudonyms; "Salty Green" also appears in the credits to the "Night Goat" single, while "Denial Fiend" is a direct reference to the credits of the Hellhammer EP Apocalyptic Raids, including the attribute of "Hellish crossfire on wooden coffins". Preston is credited for vocals although the album is instrumental, intermixed with several voice samples.

The cover art and design is a parody of Ace Frehley's 1978 solo album, in line with the King Buzzo and Dale Crover EPs also being modeled after the KISS solo albums from the same year. The credit for Marina Sirtis as "Counselor" is a reference to the actress' role as Counselor Deanna Troi on the television series Star Trek: The Next Generation.

Buzz Osborne has gone on record to say this is one of his least favorite Melvins releases, according to a CMJ New Music article in 2005:

"The whole idea [to do Kiss-esque solo albums] was a joke that went out of control. <...> Joe did his as a homework assignment. He wasn’t into it at all. We couldn’t believe that he wasn’t interested in this. That was the beginning of the end for him. It’s terrible. His heart wasn’t in it and he was a dumbass for doing that. He did it in about an afternoon."

— Buzz Osborne, CMJ New Music Weekly

== Track listing ==
No.	Title	Writer(s)	Length
1.	"The Eagle Has Landed"	Joe Preston, Denial Fiend	1:58
2.	"Bricklebrit" (contains samples from Apocalypse Now)	Joe Preston, Denial Fiend	2:36
3.	"Hands First Flower" (contains samples from Apocalypse Now)	Joe Preston, Denial Fiend, Salty Green	22:58

== Personnel ==
- Joe Preston – vocals, mixing
- Denial Fiend – Hellish crossfire on wooden coffins
- Salty Green – Chapman stick / Hands First Flower
- Jeff Brangley – producer
- Jonathan Burnside – engineer, mixing
- Harvey Bennett Stafford – cover and inside painting
- Marina Sirtis – counseling
