= Project M-13 =

Studio album by Milk Cult
- Released: March 7, 2000
- Genre: Electronic, experimental rock
- Length: 47:20
- Label: 0 To 1

Milk Cult chronology
Bruse Lee Marvin Gaye (1995)	Project M-13 (2000)

Professional ratings
Review scores
Source	Rating
Allmusic	4/5 stars

Project M-13 is the fourth and final studio album by Milk Cult, released on March 7, 2000, by 0 To 1 Recordings.

== Track listing ==
All music is composed by Dale Flattum, Eric Holland and Mike Morasky.

No.	Title	Length
1.	"Hawaiian Motorcycle Joyride" (Act 1)	1:25
2.	"Hawaiian Motorcycle Joyride" (Act 2)	2:57
3.	"Ambient Obituary"	1:35
4.	"Donka"	3:03
5.	"Slink-Fest"	2:20
6.	"Drug Lord"	2:21
7.	"Martini Boat"	3:09
8.	"Mystery Oasis"	2:29
9.	"Tens and Twenties in a Brown Paper Bag"	1:19
10.	"Pate Pipe Bomb"	4:23
11.	"Biker Party Hole"	1:32
12.	"Funky Fat Tony"	2:20
13.	"Slow Twisting"	1:09
14.	"Network Epilogue"	5:26
15.	"Slow-Twisted"	3:16
16.	"Running the Plates"	5:34
17.	"Detroit Disco Cop"	3:02

== Personnel ==
Adapted from the Project M-13 liner notes.

Milk Cult

- Dale Flattum (as C.C. Nova) – bass guitar, loops
- Eric Holland (as Conko) – electronics
- Mike Morasky (as The Bumblebee) – sampler, electronics

== Release history ==
Region	Date	Label	Format	Catalog
United States	March 7, 2000	0 To 1	CD	001
