= The Money Will Roll Right In =

1983 song by Fang

Song by Fang

from the album Landshark!
- Released: February 1983
- Genre: Punk rock
- Length: 2:27
- Label: Boner Records
- Songwriter: Tom Flynn

"The Money Will Roll Right In" is a song by American punk band Fang from their debut album Landshark!. It is a satire of public opinions on celebrity lifestyles.

Lyrics of this song include wanting to "be a star", have luxurious cars, go to Hollywood, "fuck Brooke Shields" who was a famous model at the time, getting back at people who treated you poorly and living without problems, all of which are things people commonly associate with being famous.

"I Only Want To Be With You" from "Blow In The Wind" by Spike & The Gimme Gimmes samples "The Money Will Roll Right In".

== Legacy ==
"The Money Will Roll Right In" has famously been covered by a multitude of bands, including Metallica in 1986 with two instrumental studio demo covers, Nirvana with a 1992 live cover at Reading, Mudhoney with a 2000 studio cover and a 2009 live cover. Mudhoney also played "The Money Will Roll Right In" with Kurt Cobain in 1992 on The Pretty Fucking Dirty Tour.The Headcoatees made a cover that peaked at 90 on the UK physical single charts. During the summer of 1993 The Butthole Surfers consistently played the song live.

== Nirvana version ==
Famous grunge rock band Nirvana covered the song while playing at the Reading Festival in 1992. This version of the song is heavily mumbled and has a layer of irony, with the original song critiquing the what to be famous while Nirvana are one of the most famous bands of all time

"The Money Will Roll Right In- 1992/Live at Reading"

Song by Nirvana

from the album Live at Reading
- Written: February 1983
- Released: 1 January, 2009
- Recorded: 30 August, 1992
- Venue: Reading
- Genre: Punk rock, Grunge
- Length: 2:16
- Label: Geffen Records
- Songwriter: Tom Flynn
- Producers: Nirvana, Michael Meisel, John Silva

=== Accolades ===
Publication	Country	Accolade	Rank
Rolling Stone	Australia	No Apologies: All 102 Nirvana Songs Ranked	#68

== Thee Headcoatees version ==
The all female garage rock and punk rock band Thee Headcoatees, who had broken up in the 90s, reformed in 2025 where they released their album Man-Trap. A cover of "The Money Will Roll Right In" was recorded as an outtake for the album and was later featured on an EP of outtakes. This cover peaked at 90 on UK physical singles charts.

"The Money Will Roll Right In (Kyra vocal)"

Song by Thee Headcoatees

from the EP The Man-Trap Sessions, Vol 2
- Written: February 1983
- Released: 31 October, 2025
- Studio: Ranscombe Studios
- Genre: Punk rock
- Length: 2:26
- Label: Damaged Goods Records
- Lyricist: Tom Flynn

=== Charts ===
Chart (2025)	Peak position
UK Indie Singles (MRIB)	90

== Live version ==
"The Money Will Roll Right In"

Song by Fang

from the album Live Cheap CD
- Written: 1983
- Released: 1 January 2004
- Recorded: 2003
- Genre: Punk Rock, live
- Length: 2:14
- Label: Boner Records
- Songwriter: Tom Flynn

This version of the song was made after the original lead singer Tom Flynn left the band.
