= Scars from Falling Down =

Scars From Falling Down

Studio album by Steel Pole Bath Tub
- Released: May 2, 1995
- Recorded: Various: Studio D; (Sausalito, CA); Poolside Studios; (San Francisco, CA)
- Genre: Noise rock
- Length: 46:10
- Label: London/Slash
- Producer: Steel Pole Bath Tub

Steel Pole Bath Tub chronology
| Some Cocktail Suggestions (1994) | Scars From Falling Down (1995) | Unlistenable (2002) |

Professional ratings
Review scores
| Source | Rating |
|---|---|
| AllMusic | 3/5 stars |
| The Encyclopedia of Popular Music | 3/5 stars |
| NME | 7/10 stars |

Scars From Falling Down is a studio album by Steel Pole Bath Tub, released in 1995 through Slash Records.

"Twist" was released as the album's single, accompanied by a video. Slash dropped the band after the release of the album, rejecting the idea of a follow-up album composed of experimental Cars covers.

== Critical reception ==
Trouser Press wrote: "The intriguingly straightforward Scars From Falling Down relegates the band’s battery of samples to subordinate status, a state of affairs that enhances [Mike] Morasky's fractured-but-judicious riffing while doing little to protect the air of mystery that's one of Steel Pole's chief assets." The Spokesman-Review called the album "one of the year's best major label releases," writing that "SPBT thrashes, it forges impenetrable walls of sound and noise, it floods its music with grating dissonance and, at times, it dismembers rock ‘n’ roll into an unrecognizable mess." CMJ New Music Monthly wrote that "this use of chaos as order finds precedent in tightly-wound groups like Big Black and Gang of Four." Spin called it "noise rock to the nth degree."

== Track listing ==
All tracks are written by Steel Pole Bath Tub.

| No. | Title | Length |
|---|---|---|
| 1. | "The 500 Club" | 4:59 |
| 2. | "Population 2" | 3:23 |
| 3. | "Home Is a Rope" | 3:44 |
| 4. | "The Conversation" | 5:30 |
| 5. | "Twist" | 5:50 |
| 6. | "Every Thing" | 3:42 |
| 7. | "3 of Cups" | 3:49 |
| 8. | "Four Barrels" | 1:23 |
| 9. | "Decline" | 3:49 |
| 10. | "Kansas City" | 5:03 |
| 11. | "Friday" | 6:57 |

International CD issue
| No. | Title | Length |
|---|---|---|
| 12. | "I Want It Now" | 2:44 |
| 13. | "Surrender" | 4:39 |

== Personnel ==
Adapted from the Scars From Falling Down liner notes.

Steel Pole Bath Tub

- Dale Flattum – bass guitar, vocals
- Mike Morasky – guitar, vocals
- Darren Morey (as D.K. Mor-X) – drums, vocals

Additional musicians

- Yoo – guitar (2)

Production and additional personnel

- Eric Holland – engineering, mixing (2, 4, 6 – 11)
- George Horn – mastering
- Gary Panter – cover art, illustrations
- Ed Stasium – mixing (1, 3, 5), maracas (1)
- Steel Pole Bath Tub – production
- Jan Tuuri – photography

== Release history ==
| Region | Date | Label | Format | Catalog |
|---|---|---|---|---|
| United States | 1995 | London/Slash | CD, CS, LP | 422–828 618 |
