= Thought Industry =

American progressive metal band

- Origin: Kalamazoo, Michigan, U.S.
- Genres: Avant-garde metal, progressive metal, thrash metal, alternative metal
- Years active: 1989–2001
- Label: Metal Blade
- Members: Brent Oberlin; Mike Roche; Jeff Borkowski; Cam Taylor; Mark Baldwin
- Past members: Dan Roe; Steve Spaeth; Paul Enzio; Christopher Lee; Herb Ledbetter; Dustin Donaldson; Jared Bryant

Thought Industry, formerly known as Desacrator, was an American progressive metal band. It was founded in Kalamazoo, Michigan in 1989 by vocalist/bassist Brent Oberlin, drummer Dustin Donaldson (who formed I Am Spoonbender in 1997), guitarist Christopher Lee Simmonds (a.k.a. Christopher Lee), and guitarist Steve Spaeth who replaced original Desacrator guitarist, Dan Roe. Spaeth left the band due to internal conflicts with Simmonds and started the band Clockmaker. The position was filled by guitarist Paul Enzio in time for 1992's Songs for Insects, their Metal Blade Records debut. This was followed up by Mods Carve the Pig: Assassins, Toads and God's Flesh. 1996's Outer Space Is Just a Martini Away subsequently saw a significant change in the band's sound and lineup when Donaldson was replaced by Jared Bryant. Oberlin switched to guitar and bassist Herb Ledbetter was added. Thought Industry continued to strip down their lineup and sound with 1997's moody Black Umbrella, which saw the departure of Lee. Bryant, Enzio and Ledbetter also left the band in 1999, which prompted Oberlin to assemble an entirely new lineup for 2001's magnum opus Short Wave on a Cold Day. Engineer Mike Roche, who recorded Thought Industry's Black Umbrella and Fred Thompson Trio's Scary Halloween Sound Effects and filled in on bass from time to time, was added as a full-time guitarist along with drummer Cameron Taylor, bassist Mark Baldwin and guitarist Jeff Borkowski.

== Other projects ==
Christopher Lee Simmonds continued to perform as a singer/songwriter in the Chicago area through 1996. Simultaneously recording with Filter on 1997's Title of Record and recording and producing the debut album by local band MiLkBabY for his label Moonquake Mobile. Simmonds also recorded two solo albums, toured the mid-west and east coast through late 2007 and re-located to Baltimore, Maryland, that September. There Simmonds established himself as a studio engineer and producer of many projects, the most notable of which were Good Charlotte, Jimmie's Chicken Shack, Marcy Playground, Underfoot, Filter, Gods & Aliens, Bullhead and many in the local scene. Simmonds continued with his progressive metal nature and created what most consider to be the continuation of Thought Industry, Bullhead. Bullhead is a culmination of the most extreme of Simmonds' work.

Simmonds went on to perform with The Static Dynamic, based out of Boston, Massachusetts. The band released a ten-song, self-titled CD distributed by Tunecore through iTunes and Rhapsody. Simmonds continues to perform as a solo singer/songwriter in Los Angeles, Las Vegas, Chicago, Baltimore, Pittsburgh, and Philadelphia on a regular basis. As a singer for Cosmonaut, Oberlin released Pipebomb Full of Nails in 2004. Cosmonaut's debut release was released on Swollen Lip Records.

On July 18 and 19, 2014, a Thought Industry reunion with a line-up of Brent Oberlin, Paul Enzio, Herb Ledbetter, Mike Roche and Jared Bryant took place at Shakespeare's Pub and at Louie's Trophy House Grill respectively, in Kalamazoo, Michigan.

== Discography ==
=== Studio albums ===
- Songs for Insects, Metal Blade Records, 1992
- Mods Carve the Pig: Assassins, Toads and God's Flesh, Metal Blade Records, 1993
- Outer Space Is Just a Martini Away, Metal Blade Records, 1996
- Black Umbrella, Metal Blade Records, 1997
- Short Wave on a Cold Day, Metal Blade Records, 2001

=== Singles ===
- "Gelatin 7"", Metal Blade Records, 1993

=== Compilations ===
- Recruited to Do Good Deeds for the Devil, Metal Blade Records, 1998
