= Burn or Bury =

Studio album by Milk Cult
- Released: October 23, 1994
- Studio: Poolside Studios (San Francisco, CA)
- Genre: Electronic, experimental rock
- Length: 63:19
- Label: Priority

Milk Cult chronology
Love God (1992)	Burn or Bury (1994)	Bruse Lee Marvin Gaye (1995)

Professional ratings
Review scores
Source	Rating
Allmusic	3/5 stars

Burn or Bury is the second studio album by Milk Cult, released on October 23, 1994, by Priority Records. It features contributions from numerous guests, including: Mike Patton and Billy Gould of Faith No More; Blake Schwarzenbach of Jawbreaker; Lars Fox and Bruce Boyd of Grotus; Dave Edwardson, Scott Kelly and Steve Von Till of Neurosis; Mark Davies of Thinking Fellers Union Local 282; and Carla Bozulich of The Geraldine Fibbers.

== Track listing ==
All music is composed by Dale Flattum, Eric Holland and Mike Morasky.

No.	Title	Length
1.	"Psychoanalytwist"	3:22
2.	"The Fuzz Wah Song"	6:31
3.	"Bow Kiness Static"	6:15
4.	"Blue Godzilla"	4:12
5.	"Urine, The Money"	3:34
6.	"Big King Frog"	5:31
7.	"Son of Obituary"	6:00
8.	"Hello Kitty" (Meow mix)	6:06
9.	"Rabbit in the Hole"	4:36
10.	"Sabine"	6:23
11.	"'63 Mercury Meteor ($500)"	10:49

== Personnel ==
Adapted from the Burn or Bury liner notes.

Milk Cult

- Dale Flattum (as C.C. Nova) – bass guitar, loops, electric guitar (7)
- Eric Holland (as Conko) – electronics
- Mike Morasky (as The Bumblebee) – sampler, electronics

Production

- Brian Gardner – mastering

Additional musicians

- Bruce Boyd (as Juice) – loops
- Carla Bozulich – vocals (8)
- Mark Davies – vocals (6)
- Dave Edwardson – vocals (3)
- Lars Fox – vocals (5)
- Mami Fukuya – violin (10)
- Billy Gould – bass guitar (3)
- Matt Heckert – loops (11)
- Scott Kelly – vocals (3)
- Bob McDonald (as El Bobo D'Amour) – vocals (9)
- Hidekazu Miyahara – vocals (2)
- Darren Morey (as D.K. Mor-X) – drums, percussion
- Masaya Nakahara – vocals (2)
- Mike Patton – vocals (1)
- Paul Reller – saxophone (2)
- Sheeba – vocals (2)
- Blake Schwarzenbach – vocals and electric guitar (4)
- Steve Von Till – vocals (3)

== Release history ==
Region	Date	Label	Format	Catalog
United States	October 23, 1994	Priority	CD, CS, LP	53914
