= Tumor Circus =

Studio album by Tumor Circus
- Released: 1991
- Genre: Noise rock
- Length: 59:00
- Label: Alternative Tentacles
- Producer: Tumor Circus

Jello Biafra chronology
| The Sky is Falling and I Want My Mommy (1991) | Tumor Circus (1991) | Prairie Home Invasion (1991) |

Tumor Circus was a collaboration between Jello Biafra and members of Steel Pole Bath Tub and Grong Grong. They released one self-titled album in 1991.

The album was rated 3.5 out of five stars by PunkNews.org.

== Track listing ==
1. "Hazing for Success (Pork Grind Confidential)" – 9:03
2. "Human Cyst" - 3:26
3. "The Man with the Corkscrew Eyes" - 4:05
4. "Fireball" - 7:08
5. "Swine Flu" - 3:53
6. "Calcutta a-Go-Go" - 6:52
7. "Take Me Back or I'll Drown Our Dog (Headlines)" - 3:59
8. "Meathook Up My Rectum" - 4:56
9. "Turn Off the Respirator" - 15:38

== Personnel ==
- Jello Biafra – vocals, words, "conceptual psychosis"
- Darren Mor-X – drums
- Charles Tolney – Fender Jaguar, effects
- Dale Flattum – bass, fuzz
- Mike Morasky – guitar, tapes, samples
- Tom Doty – piano on "Turn Off the Respirator"

== Notes ==
The song "The Man with the Corkscrew Eyes" features a sound clip from The Fever (The Twilight Zone) at the beginning of the song: "This machine... It's inhuman, the way it lets you win a little then takes it all back. It teases you. It holds out promises and wields you. It sucks you in and then..." The lyrics of the song "Take Me Back or I'll Drown Our Dog (Headlines)" reference the television programs Nightline, Twin Peaks, and The Simpsons, and the track features backing vocals from the late GWAR vocalist David Brockie.
