= Love God =

Studio album by Milk Cult
- Released: December 7, 1992
- Recorded: 1992
- Studio: Poolside Studios (San Francisco, CA)
- Genre: Electronic, experimental rock
- Length: 62:56
- Label: Boner

Milk Cult chronology
Love God (1992)	Burn or Bury (1994)

Professional ratings
Review scores
Source	Rating
Allmusic	3/5 stars

Love God is the debut studio album by the electronic band Milk Cult, released in December 7, 1992 by Boner Records.

== Track listing ==
All music is composed by Dale Flattum, Eric Holland and Mike Morasky.

No.	Title	Length
1.	"Love God"	10:37
2.	"Drag Strip Riot Dream Sequence"	2:52
3.	"Tuesday"	4:01
4.	"Relax and Sleep"	2:19
5.	"Look at the Drowning Man"	5:03
6.	"Clown Party 1"	3:23
7.	"Clown Party 2"	10:15
8.	"Clown Party 3"	4:54
9.	"Clown Party 4"	7:45
10.	"Clown Party 5"	5:14
11.	"Clown Party 6"	6:33

== Accolades ==
Publication	Country	Accolade	Year	Rank
Spex	Germany	Albums of the Year	1993	24

== Personnel ==
Adapted from the Love God liner notes.

Milk Cult

- Dale Flattum (as C.C. Nova) – bass guitar, loops
- Eric Holland (as Conko) – electronics
- Mike Morasky (as The Bumblebee) – sampler, electronics

Additional musicians

- Mark Brooks (as D.J. 3KSK) – turntables
- Darren Morey (as D.K. Mor-X) – percussion

Production and additional personnel

- Frank Grow – cover art

== Release history ==
Region	Date	Label	Format	Catalog
United States	December 7, 1992	Boner	CS	BR38
United States	May 10, 1993	Boner	CD, LP	BR38
