= Unlistenable =

Studio album by Steel Pole Bath Tub
- Released: September 24, 2002
- Recorded: Fall 1996
- Genre: Experimental rock
- Length: 72:48
- Label: 0 to 1
- Producer: Steel Pole Bath Tub

Steel Pole Bath Tub chronology
Scars from Falling Down (1995)	Unlistenable (2002)

Professional ratings
Review scores
Source	Rating
Allmusic	3/5 stars

Unlistenable is the fifth studio album by Steel Pole Bath Tub, released on September 24, 2002, by 0 to 1 Recordings.

== Track listing ==
All tracks are written by Steel Pole Bath Tub, except "What I Need", "The Good Times" and "My Best Friend's a Girl".

No.	Title	Length
1.	"Spoon House"	1:24
2.	"Action Man Theme"	3:59
3.	"Black Eye Fixer"	4:12
4.	"What I Need" (The Cars cover)	3:38
5.	"Re-Juvenated"	1:12
6.	"Teenage Middle Finger"	1:24
7.	"Kinder Party"	5:10
8.	"Spun"	3:12
9.	"Jack Aloha"	2:26
10.	"Hot Water into Steam"	1:58
11.	"The Good Times" (The Cars cover)	1:43
12.	"My Best Friend's a Girl" (The Cars cover)	1:33
13.	"Cherry Tomato"	3:48
14.	"Glad Ass"	1:35
15.	"Old Man Bar"	1:47
16.	"Park Night"	2:24
17.	"H2O 2"	1:42
18.	"[silence]"	3:23
19.	"[untitled]"	26:08

== Personnel ==
Adapted from the Unlistenable liner notes.

Steel Pole Bath Tub

- Dale Flattum – bass guitar, vocals
- Mike Morasky – guitar, vocals
- Darren Morey (as D.K. Mor-X) – drums, vocals

Production and additional personnel

- Steel Pole Bath Tub – production

== Release history ==
Region	Date	Label	Format	Catalog
United States	2002	0 to 1	CD	003
United States	2010	Permanent	LP	PERM-015
