= Bruse Lee Marvin Gaye =

Studio album by Milk Cult
- Released: January 18, 1995
- Recorded: February 1994
- Genre: Electronic, experimental rock
- Length: 62:34
- Label: ZK

Milk Cult chronology
Burn or Bury (1994)	Bruse Lee Marvin Gaye (1995)	Project M-13 (2000)

Bruse Lee Marvin Gaye is the third studio album by Milk Cult, released on January 18, 1995, by ZK Records.

== Track listing ==
All music is composed by Dale Flattum, Eric Holland and Mike Morasky.

No.	Title	Length
1.	"Samba Beat"	1:11
2.	"Lip Charade"	2:15
3.	"Country Beat"	1:20
4.	"Space Zero"	2:20
5.	"Jughead Beat"	0:26
6.	"Fuzz Wah Song"	4:12
7.	"D-D-D-Light H-H-Hop Skip Thing"	0:44
8.	"Uptight Chavy Malibu Station Wagon"	1:53
9.	"Jungian Bongo Party"	1:28
10.	"Disco Noise Man"	10:56
11.	"#@/Ae+_???" (Part 1)	3:28
12.	"#@/Ae+_???" (Part 2)	4:52
13.	"#@/Ae+_???" (Part 3)	11:25
14.	"#@/Ae+_???" (Part 4)	2:00
15.	"#@/Ae+_???" (Part 5)	2:00
16.	"#@/Ae+_???" (Part 6)	2:00
17.	"#@/Ae+_???" (Part 7)	2:00
18.	"#@/Ae+_???" (Part 8)	2:00
19.	"#@/Ae+_???" (Part 9)	2:00
20.	"#@/Ae+_???" (Part 10)	2:00
21.	"#@/Ae+_???" (Part 11)	2:04

== Personnel ==
Adapted from the Bruse Lee Marvin Gaye liner notes.

Milk Cult

- Dale Flattum (as C.C. Nova) – bass guitar, tape, turntables
- Eric Holland (as Conko) – electronics
- Mike Morasky (as The Bumblebee) – tape, turntables

Additional musicians

- Mami Fukuya – vocals (5), violin (10)
- Hidekazu Miyahara – vocals (2, 6), sampler (4), guitar (8)
- Masaya Nakahara – synthesizer (1, 2, 4, 7–10), vocals (6)
- Sheeba – bass guitar (2, 9, 10), vocals (6)
- Pop Suzuki – drums (1, 9)
- Hideki Yoshimura – guitar (1, 4, 6, 8, 9), knobs (2), vocals (10)

== Release history ==
Region	Date	Label	Format	Catalog
Japan	January 18, 1995	ZK	CD	ZIKS-017
