= Outer Space Is Just a Martini Away =

Outer Space is Just a Martini Away

Studio album by Thought Industry
- Released: 1996
- Genres: Alternative rock, alternative metal
- Label: Metal Blade Records
- Producer: Thought Industry

Thought Industry chronology
Mods Carve The Pig: Assassins, Toads and God's Flesh (1993)	Outer Space is Just a Martini Away (1996)	Black Umbrella (1997)

Professional ratings
Review scores
Source	Rating
Sputnikmusic	3.5/5 stars
Allmusic	4/5 stars

Outer Space is Just a Martini Away is the third album from Kalamazoo-based progressive metal band Thought Industry. Released in 1996 on Metal Blade Records.

== Track listing ==
1. Love is America Spelled Backwards (Oberlin) 2:42
2. Jeb and the Haymaker (lyrics: Oberlin/music: Bryant, Oberlin, Enzio, Lee) 3:05
3. Fairy (lyrics: Oberlin/music: Enzio) 4:29
4. The Squid (Oberlin) 3:38
5. Dante Dangling from a Noose (lyrics: Oberlin/music: Enzio) 2:45
6. Jack Frost Junior (lyrics: Oberlin/music: Oberlin, Enzio, Lee) 4:25
7. Pinto Award in Literature (Oberlin) 2:10
8. Soot on the Radio (Oberlin) 3:51
9. Watercolour Grey (Oberlin) 4:58
10. Sharron Sours (lyrics: Oberlin/music: Lee) 5:04
11. D.I.Y. Tranquilizers (lyrics: Oberlin/music: Lee) 4:11
12. Fruitcake and Cider (Oberlin) 2:35
13. Atomic Stroller Helps None (lyrics: Oberlin/music: Lee) 1:24
14. Bottomfeeder (Oberlin) 5:47

== Credits ==
- Brent Oberlin: vocals, guitar, synth, sampling, piano, electronic percussion, acoustic guitar
- Christopher Lee: guitar, fretless guitar, piano, acoustic guitar, keyboard
- Paul Enzio: guitar, 7 string guitar, classical guitar
- Herb Ledbetter: bass guitar, fretless bass
- Jared Bryant: drums, percussion, ethnic percussion
- Produced by Thought Industry
