= Scotty Wilkins =

American punk rock singer and musician

Scotty Wilkins is an American punk rock singer and musician. Wilkins is most widely known as the singer for the Los Angeles punk rock band Hollywood Hate and previously, San Francisco punk rock band, Verbal Abuse. In the mid-1990s, Wilkins joined New York band, Electric Frankenstein. Wilkins' first serious band that toured was called Condemned to Death. His first attempt at being in a band was with local group, The Lonerz.

== Discography ==
- Condemned to Death C2D: "Diary of a Love Monster"
- Condemned to Death C2D: "Can't kill a Vat Rat (Best of)"
- Verbal Abuse: Them Boners Be Poppin
- Verbal Abuse: Rocks Your Liver
- Verbal Abuse: "Rat Music for Rat People - compilation"
- Verbal Abuse: Thrasher Magazine music compilation 10
- Verbal Abuse: "Passport (live in Berlin)"
- Verbal Abuse: "Red White and Violent!"
- Electric Frankenstein: "Action High"
- Electric Frankenstein: 7" split w/ The Hellacopters (Sweden)
- Electric Frankenstein: "Live @ WFMU full Length"
- Electric Frankenstein: "How To Make A Monster
- Electric Frankenstein: "Live @ The Continental NYC"
- Hollywood Hate: "Product of Our Environment
- Hollywood Hate: "7" split w/CC (Sweden)
- Hollywood Hate: "Punch Drunk 5" TKO records
