= Dale Crover (EP) =

EP by Melvins (Dale Crover)
- Released: August 1992
- Recorded: 1991
- Genre: Grunge; punk rock
- Length: 12:39
- Label: Boner
- Producer: Greg Freeman and Dale Crover

Melvins (Dale Crover) chronology
King Buzzo (1992)	Dale Crover (1992)	Joe Preston (1992)

Dale Crover chronology
Dale Crover (1992)	Drumb (1996)

Professional ratings
Review scores
Source	Rating
AllMusic	2/5 stars

Dale Crover is an EP by Melvins' drummer Dale Crover, which was released in 1992 through Boner Records.

The cover art for the album is a parody of the cover art from Peter Criss' 1978 solo release.

Buzz Osborne stated, according to a CMJ New Music article in 2005: "The whole idea [to do Kiss-esque solo albums] was a joke that went out of control."

== Track listing ==
All songs written by Dale Crover.

No.	Title	Length
1.	"Hex Me"	1:14
2.	"Dead Wipe"	2:47
3.	"Respite"	4:16
4.	"Hurter"	4:22

== Personnel ==
- Dale Crover - lead vocals, backup vocals, rhythm guitar, lead guitar, drums
- Debbi Shane - bass, backup vocals
- Greg Freeman - producer, engineer
- Harvey Bennett Stafford - cover and insert painting
