= The Unholy Handjob =

Studio album by DUH
- Released: 1995
- Studio: Various: Pink Pyramid Studios; (San Francisco, CA); Luxa Pan Studios; (Austin, TX)
- Genre: Alternative metal
- Length: 35:39
- Label: Alternative Tentacles
- Producer: Paul Barker, Dean Menta

DUH chronology
Blowhard (1991)	The Unholy Handjob (1995)

The Unholy Handjob is the second studio album by DUH, released in 1995 by Alternative Tentacles.

== Music ==
Because of the less than serious nature of the project, the music of The Unholy Handjob is based around simplified riffs and notably more alternative metal-based than its predecessor, which was firmly rooted in noisy garage rock and sludge metal. The track "Pricks Are Heavy" is a live performance of the band opening for L7 at Whisky a Go Go. The track's title is a pun of Bricks Are Heavy by L7, comprises a tongue-in-cheek and haphazardly performed medley of "Heart-Shaped Box" by Nirvana, "Basket Case" by Green Day and "Shitlist" by L7 in-between vocalist Greg Werckman aggressively taunting the crowd.

== Reception ==
Professional ratings
Review scores
Source	Rating
Allmusic	2.5/5 stars

Ned Raggett, who had written a positive review of the band's debut, was critical of The Unholy Handjob. He gave the album two-and-a-half out of five stars, saying "the vocalist (clearly not Biafra, that much is clear) aims for yelled pseudo-metal smoothness, if such a thing exists, and the riffs and songs are as rockingly clichéd as they get. If Butt Trumpet, say, had done this kind of thing, nobody would have noticed much about it, and if it had been marketed as a direct parody, doubtless little would have cared."

== Track listing ==
All tracks are written by DUH, except "Three's Company" by Don Nicholl and Joe Raposo and "Teenage Kicks" by John O'Neill.

No.	Title	Length
1.	"You Are The Sugar (I Want to Borrow)"	3:07
2.	"+ 1"	2:25
3.	"Mmmmmaniac"	2:42
4.	"Three's Company" (theme from the sitcom)	0:38
5.	"Pocket Pool"	1:52
6.	"Buns of Marshmellow"	4:23
7.	"Our Guitarist Is in Faith No More"	0:49
8.	"Swallow the Pill"	2:48
9.	"My Fraulein From the Black Forest"	3:18
10.	"Full of Shit"	2:55
11.	"Teenage Kicks" (Undertones cover)	2:41
12.	"Pricks Are Heavy" (live)	8:01

== Personnel ==
Adapted from The Unholy Handjob liner notes.

DUH

- Chris Dodge – drums, oboe, bass guitar, backing vocals
- Dustin Donaldson (as Shitty Bicker) – percussion
- Sean Kelly (as S.K.) – bass guitar
- Dean Menta – electric guitar, backing vocals, production
- Greg Werckman (as Grig Cashmoney) – vocals

Production and additional personnel

- Paul Barker – production
- Harvey Bennett Stafford – cover art, illustrations
- George Horn – mastering
- Candace Workman – photography
- John Yates – photography

== Release history ==
Region	Date	Label	Format	Catalog
United States	1995	Alternative Tentacles	CD, CS, LP	Virus 168
