= Short Wave on a Cold Day =

Short Wave On a Cold Day

Studio album by Thought Industry
- Released: September 11, 2001
- Genre: Alternative rock, art rock, alternative metal
- Label: Metal Blade
- Producer: Thought Industry

Thought Industry chronology
Recruited to Do Good Deeds for the Devil (1998)	Short Wave On a Cold Day (2001)

Professional ratings
Review scores
Source	Rating
Allmusic	link
Sputnikmusic	link

Short Wave on a Cold Day is the fifth album released by Kalamazoo-based progressive metal band Thought Industry. It was released in 2001 on Metal Blade Records.

== Track listing ==
1. Satan in the Gift Shop (Oberlin) 6:47
2. I'm Lonely (and Grooving Like Cancer) (Oberlin) 4:00
3. The Waitress in the Bar Orbiting Io (Oberlin) 4:18
4. Burning Coal With Margaret (music: Baldwin/words: Oberlin) 3:55
5. Tall Ships on the Rocks (Oberlin) 3:30
6. Kiss Judy Fly (music: Roche/words: Oberlin) 3:09
7. The Measure of our Miles (music: Roche/words: Oberlin) 3:59
8. Lovers In Flames (music: Roche/words: Oberlin) 3:13
9. A Week and Seven Days (music: Borkowski/words: Oberlin) 3:53
10. Particle Hustler (Oberlin) 2:47
11. Longfellow (music: Taylor/words: Oberlin) 4:01
12. Hello, Murder (music: Roche/words: Oberlin) 4:44
13. So Says Ike (Oberlin) 3:11
14. Beautiful Coma (music: Roche/words: Oberlin) 4:16
15. Interstellar Fix, 2056 (music: Roche/words: Oberlin) 6:13
16. Alien and Pure (Oberlin) 4:53
17. 4:59

== Personnel ==
- Brent Oberlin - vocals, guitar
- Mike Roche - guitar
- Cameron Taylor - drums
- Jeff Borkowski - guitar, keyboards
- Mark Baldwin - bass guitar
- Produced by Thought Industry
