= Tulip (album) =

Album by Steel Pole Bath Tub

Studio album by Steel Pole Bath Tub
- Released: 1990
- Recorded: Rhythm and Noise Compound, San Francisco, California
- Genre: Noise rock
- Length: 40:09
- Label: Boner
- Producer: Eric Holland, Steel Pole Bath Tub

Steel Pole Bath Tub chronology
| Lurch/Butterfly Love (1990) | Tulip (1990) | The Miracle of Sound in Motion (1993) |

Professional ratings
Review scores
| Source | Rating |
|---|---|
| Allmusic | 4.5/5 stars |

Tulip is the second studio album by Steel Pole Bath Tub, released in 1990 by Boner Records.

== Track listing ==
All tracks are written by Dale Flattum, Mike Morasky and Darren Morey.

Side one
| No. | Title | Length |
|---|---|---|
| 1. | "Soul Cannon" | 4:38 |
| 2. | "Sister" | 3:27 |
| 3. | "Quark" | 3:14 |
| 4. | "One Thick Second" | 1:45 |
| 5. | "Pirate 5" | 4:08 |
| 6. | "BBQ Applause" |

Side two
| No. | Title | Length |
|---|---|---|
| 1. | "Mercurochrome" | 5:11 |
| 2. | "Wonders of Dust" | 2:12 |
| 3. | "The Scarlet" | 5:16 |
| 4. | "Misty Mt. Blowtorch" | 3:33 |
| 5. | "Myrna Loy" | 3:14 |
| 6. | "Pause" | 3:31 |

== Personnel ==
Adapted from the Tulip liner notes.

Steel Pole Bath Tub

- Dale Flattum – bass guitar, turntables, effects, vocals
- Mike Morasky – guitar, sampler, vocals
- Darren Morey (as D.K. Mor-X) – drums

Additional musicians

- Noah Landis (Noah Pinion) – harmonica (B2)
- Paul Reller – saxophone (B5)

Production and additional personnel

- Eric Holland – production, engineering
- Steel Pole Bath Tub – production
- Werkstätte Auf Taos – illustrations

== Release history ==
| Region | Date | Label | Format | Catalog |
|---|---|---|---|---|
| United States | 1991 | Boner | CD, CS, LP | BR26 |
| United States | 1991 | Tupelo | CD, CS, LP | TUP27 |
| United States | 2015 | Sinister Torch | LP | STR-003 |
