= Black Umbrella =

Studio album by Thought Industry
- Released: 1997
- Genres: Progressive metal, alternative metal
- Label: Metal Blade
- Producers: Mike Roche; Thought Industry

Thought Industry chronology
Outer Space Is Just a Martini Away (1996)	Black Umbrella (1997)	Recruited To Do Good Deeds For The Devil (1998)

Professional ratings
Review scores
Source	Rating
AllMusic	4.5/5 stars

Black Umbrella is the fourth album by the Kalamazoo-based progressive metal band Thought Industry, released in 1997.

== Critical reception ==
AllMusic wrote that "a wide variety of sonic textures, complex rhythms, and an eclectic musical range, from heavy metal to alternative to jazz, support what is perhaps the band's strongest set of intricate, progressive melodies yet."

== Track listing ==
- All words by Brent
1. My Famous Mistake (Oberlin) 2:50
2. Blue (Oberlin) 2:30
3. Tragic Juliet (Oberlin) 3:33
4. World (Enzio) 3:53
5. Bitter (Oberlin) 3:19
6. Consistently Yours, Pluto (Oberlin) 3:16
7. December 10th (Ledbetter, Oberlin) 3:52
8. Edward Smith (Oberlin) 4:34
9. Her Rusty Nail (Oberlin) 4:26
10. Pink Dumbo (Oberlin) 3:10
11. Swank (Oberlin) 3:14
12. Earwig (Oberlin) 4:41
13. 24 Hours Ago I Could Breathe/Dec. 11 (Enzio, Bryant) 9:20

== Credits ==
- Paul Enzio - guitars
- Jared Bryant - drums
- Herb Ledbetter - bass guitar
- Brent Oberlin - guitar, vocals
- Produced by Mike Roche and Thought Industry
