= Drumb =

Drumb Mansruin

EP by Dale Crover
- Released: 1996
- Genre: Experimental
- Length: 11:36
- Label: Man's Ruin Records
- Producer: Dale Crover and Joe Barresi

Dale Crover chronology
Dale Crover (1992)	Drumb Mansruin (1996)

Drumb Mansruin (otherwise known as Drumb) is a 1996 solo EP by Melvins' drummer Dale Crover. It was released under the independent label Man's Ruin Records (MR004), was printed on blue vinyl, and is only about 12 minutes long. It is most notable for being Crover's only solo output. Few pressings were made and the album is no longer being sold. The A-side is several minutes of drums and noise. The B-side is the A-side reversed. The cover art is by Frank Kozik

== Track listing ==
1. "Forwards (Four Words)" (Crover) – 5:45
2. "Backwards (Back Words)" (Crover) – 5:51

== Personnel ==
- Dale Crover - vocals, producer
- Joe Barresi - engineer, producer
- Geetus "Guido South" Aguto - assistant engineer
- Mike "Elvis" Smith - assistant engineer
- Billy Anderson -digital editing
