= Recruited to Do Good Deeds for the Devil =

Recruited To Do Good Deeds for the Devil

Compilation album by Thought Industry
- Released: 1998
- Genre: Progressive metal
- Label: Metal Blade Records
- Producer: Thought Industry

Thought Industry chronology
Black Umbrella (1997)	Recruited To Do Good Deeds for the Devil (1998)	Short Wave on a Cold Day (2001)

Professional ratings
Review scores
Source	Rating
Allmusic	3/5 stars

Recruited to Do Good Deeds for the Devil is the fifth album released by Kalamazoo-based progressive metal band Thought Industry. It is a compilation album featuring previously unreleased songs and live tracks.

== Track listing ==
1. "Hello, Lovey Dovey..." (Bryant) 0:38
2. Love is America Spelled Backwards (Jim Grace Version) (Oberlin) 3:39
3. Metal (Gary Numan) 3:43
4. Get Up and Slumber (Oberlin) 5:30
5. Famous Mistake (Live) (Oberlin, Enzio, Bryant, Ledbetter) 2:45
6. Atomic Stroller Helps None (Remix) (Lee, Oberlin) 1:25
7. Louisiana (Lee, Oberlin) 5:16
8. Republicans in Love (Live) (Oberlin, Lee, Enzio, Donaldson) 4:34
9. Cornerstone (Live) (Oberlin, Lee, Enzio, Donaldson) 3:30
10. Encounter with a Hick (Oberlin, Lee, Enzio, Donaldson) 4:28
11. The Squid (Live) (Oberlin) 4:00
12. Earwig ("Say Amen" Remix) (Oberlin, Enzio, Bryant, Ledbetter) 5:14
13. Whine (Oberlin, Enzio, Bryant, Ledbetter) 2:57
14. Watercolour Grey (Gordon Lightfoot Version) (Oberlin) 5:58
15. Gelatin (Live) (Oberlin, Enzio, Lee, Donaldson) 4:55
16. Final Ballet (Oberlin, Lee, Donaldson, Spaeth) 1:01
17. December 10th (Remix) (Oberlin, Enzio, Bryant, Ledbetter) 3:16
18. Blue (Live) (Oberlin, Enzio, Bryant, Ledbetter) 3:17
19. Love is America Spelled Backwards (Live) (Oberlin) 2:58
20. nnnon (Oberlin, Enzio, Lee, Donaldson) 1:45

== Personnel ==
- Brent Oberlin - vocals, guitar, bass guitar on 3, 10 & 16
- Paul Enzio - guitar
- Herb Ledbetter - bass
- Jared Bryant - drums
- Christopher Lee - guitar on 3, 4, 6, 7, 10 & 16
- Dustin Donaldson - drums on 3, 10, & 16
- Produced by Thought Industry
