= Your Choice Records – The 7 Inches =

Compilation album

Your Choice Records - the 7 inches
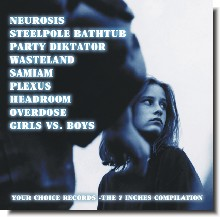

Compilation album by Various Artists
- Released: 2002
- Genre: Punk rock Indie rock Emo; Post-hardcore; Hardcore punk
- Label: Your Choice Records
- Producer: Tobby Holzinger

Your Choice Rec. -compilations chronology
It's Your Choice (2x10")	Your Choice Records - the 7 inches

Your Choice Records - the 7 inches is a 2 x CD compilation album with rare material of Neurosis, Steel Pole Bath Tub, Party Diktator, Wasteland, Samiam, Plexus, Headroom, Overdose and Girls Against Boys.

This compilation contains songs that were released as limited vinyl 7 inches by Your Choice Records in the 1990s. Exclusive bonus material has been added by the German bands Overdose and Headroom.

== Track listing ==
DISC 1:

1. Neurosis - "Day of the lords"
2. Neurosis - "The choice" (cover of a song by Joy Division)
3. Steel Pole Bath Tub - "Hey Bo Diddley"
4. Steel Pole Bath Tub - "One thick second"
5. Steel Pole Bath Tub - "Heaven on dirt"
6. Party Diktator - "Beam me up"
7. Party Diktator - "Pressure"
8. Wasteland - "Waiting for the noise"
9. Wasteland - "Lost power"
10. Girls Against Boys - "Bullet proof cupid"
11. Overdose - "Megatone" (previously unreleased bonus track)

DISC 2:

1. Samiam - "Song 1" (unknown title)
2. Samiam - "Song 2" (unknown title)
3. Samiam - "Song 3" (unknown title)
4. Plexus - "See the feeling"
5. Plexus - "Helium submarine"
6. Headroom - "Be a god"
7. Headroom - "Explain"
8. Overdose - "Hide your soul"
9. Overdose - "Sex monster"
10. Girls Against Boys - "Satin down"
11. Headroom - "Sound my mind" (previously unreleased bonus track)
12. Headroom - "Aphrodites" (previously unreleased bonus track)
13. Headroom - "Hybrid" (previously unreleased bonus track)
14. Headroom - "Monochrome" (previously unreleased bonus track)
15. Headroom - "Refuge" (previously unreleased bonus track)

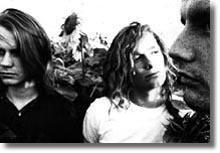
WASTELAND (1993)

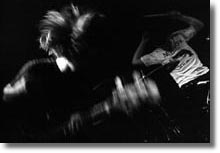
STEEL POLE BATH TUB -live

== Record covers of the 7 inches ==
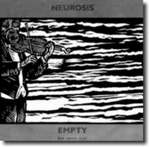
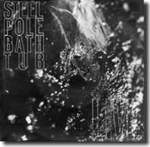
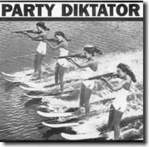
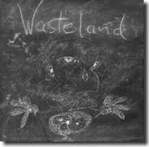
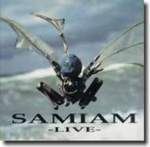
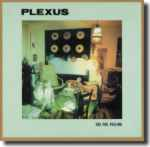
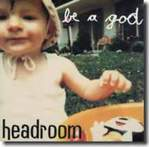
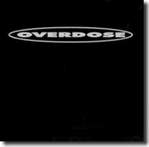
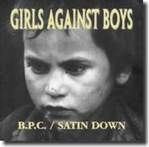
