= Dean Menta =

American musician

- Born: July 23, 1966 (age 59); San Jose, California
- Genres: Alternative metal
- Occupation: Musician
- Instrument: Guitarist
- Years active: 1995–present
- Formerly of: DUH; Faith No More; Sparks

Dean Menta (born July 23, 1966) is an American Emmy nominated music editor and composer living in Los Angeles, California.

== Biography ==
In 1995, Dean Menta became involved in the band DUH and appeared on their second album The Unholy Handjob. Menta went on to serve as the guitarist for the rock band Faith No More from 1995 to 1996. He had been a keyboard tech for the band, first meeting them in 1991, while working at a San Francisco art gallery. Menta was recruited to handle guitar duties after Trey Spruance declined to tour for the album King for a Day... Fool for a Lifetime. He appears in their videos for "Digging the Grave", "Ricochet" and "Evidence". He was replaced as Faith No More guitarist by Jon Hudson.

Since leaving Faith No More, Menta has been performing and recording with pop group Sparks. He has contributed to Sparks' albums: Plagiarism (1997) Lil' Beethoven (2002) Hello Young Lovers (2006) Exotic Creatures of the Deep (2008), The Seduction of Ingmar Bergman (2009) and Hippopotamus (2017).

Menta now works primarily in television and film as a Music Editor, composer and Sound Designer. Additionally, Menta has also composed music for several video games, one of which, Jak X: Combat Racing, was in collaboration with Billy Howerdel of A Perfect Circle.
