= Your Choice Live Series 019 =

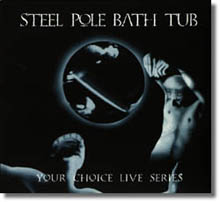

Live album by Steel Pole Bath Tub
- Released: 1993
- Recorded: September 17, 1992
- Genre: Noise rock Hardcore punk
- Length: 56:07
- Label: Your Choice
- Producer: Tobby Holzinger

Steel Pole Bath Tub chronology
The Miracle of Sound in Motion (1993)	Your Choice Live Series 019 (1993)	Best of Steel Pole Bath Tub (1993)

Your Choice Live Series 019 is a live album by Steel Pole Bath Tub. It was recorded live at Alte Turnhalle in Albig, Germany by Rock City Studios on September 17, 1992 and mixed in San Francisco by Steel Pole Bath Tub. This album is the first full-length live album by Steel Pole Bath Tub, produced by Tobby Holzinger.

More live material by Steel Pole Bath Tub has been released on a limited (and sold out) "live" 7 inch that was recorded in Alzey, Germany on January 23, 1991. It has been re-released as a part of the two CDs compilation Your Choice Records – the 7 inches.

== Track listing ==
1. Borstal
2. Bozeman
3. Sister
4. Mercurochrome
5. Slip
6. Arizona Garbage Truck
7. Carbon
8. Scarlet
9. Pseudoepherdrine Hydrochloride

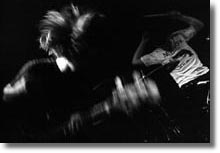
Steel Pole Bath Tub recording the live album in Germany

== Personnel ==
Steel Pole Bath Tub

- Dale Flattum - Bass, vocals
- Darren Mir-X - Drums
- Mike Malesteen - Guitar, vocals

Additional personnel

- Tobby Holzinger - Producer
