= Verbal Abuse (band) =

American hardcore punk/crossover thrash band

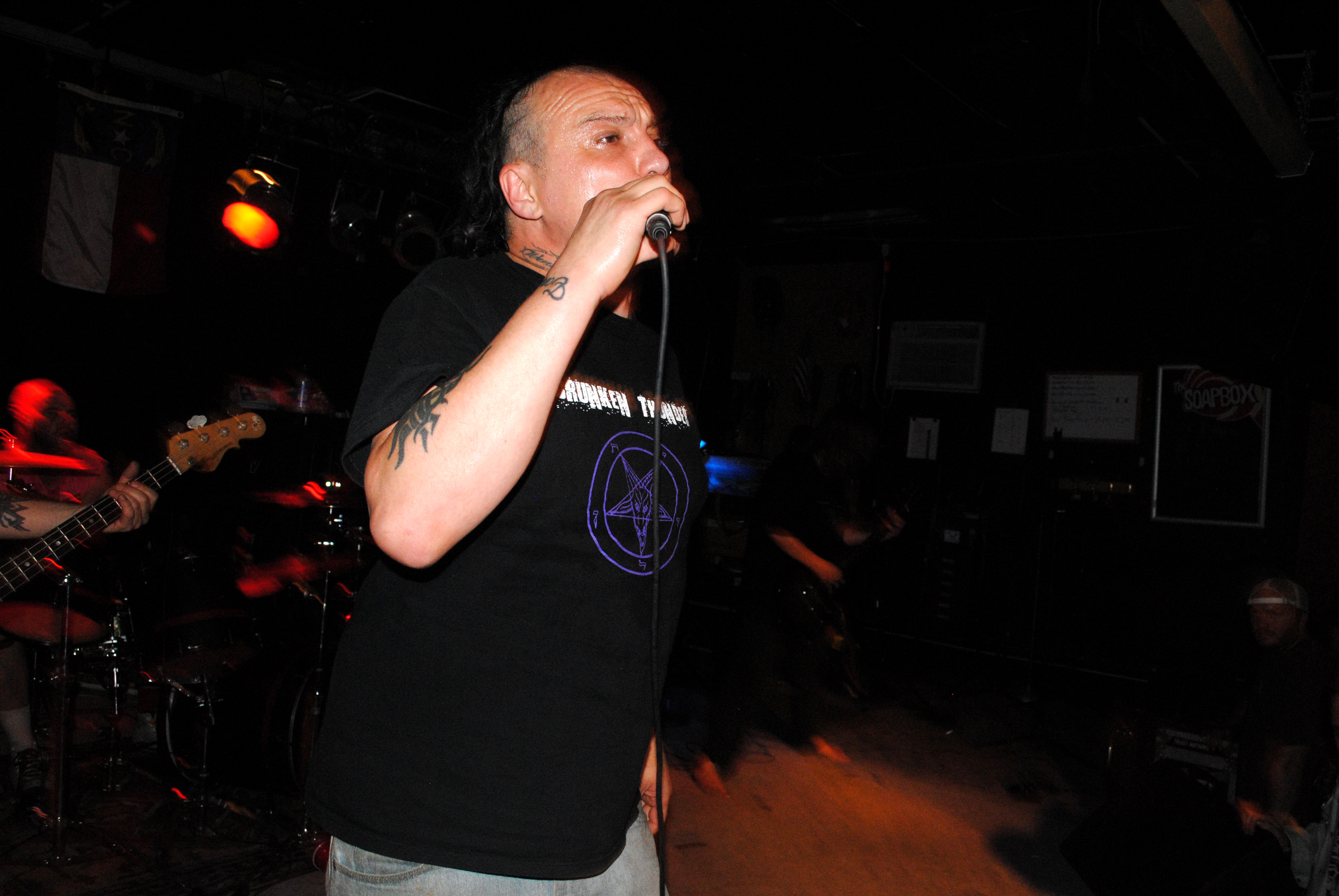
- Live in May 2010 in Wilmington, North Carolina

Background information
- Origin: Houston, Texas, U.S.
- Genres: Hardcore punk, crossover thrash
- Years active: 1981–1995, 2004–present
- Labels: Beer City, Fowl, Boner Records, Destiny, Century Media
- Members: Nicki Sicki; Bubba Dennis; Dave "Koko" Chavez "Sick" Scott Stanton; Geza Szent-Galy
- Past members: Scotty Wilkins; Joie Mastrokalos; Jason Shapiro; Andy Schuman; Brett Dodwell; Nick Nobody; Gregg James; Radi Kilowatt; Jason Riquelmy; Mike Chubka; Chris Kontos; General Electric; Ed Loco; Ed Loco, Jr. Bubba Dennis; Jess Aaron; Sean Sutton; Greg Elliot; Luke Skeels; John Glenn; Bitchy Bill

Verbal Abuse is an American hardcore punk/crossover thrash band formed in Houston in 1981. They were one of the early bands of hardcore punk. In 1983, they relocated to San Francisco where they recorded a solid hardcore album. By 1985, along with multiple band member changes, they had transitioned to a crossover thrash sound, becoming a significant part of the nascent California crossover thrash scene. Eventually they settled in Oakland, California.

== History ==
=== Early years (1981–1983) ===
Verbal Abuse was established in 1981 by 17-year-old singer and songwriter Nicki Sicki, former member of the bands Sick Pleasure and Legionnaire's Disease. Radi Kilowatt handled the bass duties, his brother General Electric (aka G.E.) was the original guitarist, and John Glenn played drums. The band members lived together in a church, where Radi was working. G.E. left the band after claiming to have found religion and declaring that Nicki Sicki was evil. He was replaced by guitarist Joie Mastrokalos. During this early period, drummer Jason Riquelmy from the band Skate Death occasionally assumed drum duties when John Glenn was not available.

In February 1983, Glenn was advised by a Native American spiritual adviser named Rolling Thunder not to travel with the band to play a concert in New Orleans for Mardi Gras, since it was "a bad day to travel" according to his superstitious beliefs. The other band members told him that if he chose not to come with them, he would be kicked out permanently. Glenn proceeded to assume a meditative pose, sitting cross-legged in the parking lot and burning incense with a sad expression as the group left for the concert without a drummer. In New Orleans the band played with Toxin III, a band from Lafayette, Louisiana, and recruited their drummer Bitchy Bill to play the show with both bands, serving only as a temporary replacement in Verbal Abuse for this one gig. At the end of the concert, Bitchy Bill proceeded to load his drums into Verbal Abuse's van, to the dismay of his bandmates and girlfriend, who convinced him to temporarily abandon his whim to join them and to return with Toxin III to Lafayette. However, three days later, back at the church in Houston, Bitchy Bill arrived unannounced with his drums and officially joined Verbal Abuse.

With this lineup, the band decided to relocate to San Francisco. After Nicki Sicki had left for California, Radi Kilowatt was forbidden by his girlfriend to leave Texas and therefore decided to give up his position in the band. Lacking his own vehicle, Mastrokalos convinced his friend Brett Dodwell to relocate from Texas to California and become the new bassist of Verbal Abuse. Although he had limited skill at playing the instrument and none of the other members had been informed about the personnel change, Dodwell became the band's bass player upon arrival in San Francisco.

After a few weeks in California, Bitchy Bill began to annoy the other band members with his selfish behavior. The rest of the group was living on the streets in the van, while Bill rented a comfortable apartment and refused to allow his bandmates access to his facilities. The van could often be seen parked overnight at the Safeway parking lot on Marker and Church St. While driving down Market Street in San Francisco, the band pulled over to the curb and unloaded Bill's drum set onto the sidewalk. He got out of the van, and they drove away. For a while the band lived at their rehearsal space at the San Francisco Beer Vats a semi abandoned warehouse building that used to be a Hamms beer brewery. The band would be locked into the rehearsal space at night and had to use makeshift improvised restroom facilities using bottles or jars. Someone would unlock the space in the morning to let them out.

During this time period, the members of Verbal Abuse all kept their heads shaved. During this time Nicki Sicki also shaved his eyebrows creating a quite an appearance for the time. When they met drummer Gregg James, his head was already shaved, so the band immediately accepted him as the new drummer without any further auditions.

=== Just an American Band and departure of Nicki Sicki ===
With the lineup of Nicki Sicki, Joie Mastrokalos, Brett Dodwell and Gregg James, Verbal Abuse was signed by Fowl Records and in 1983 they recorded their first LP, Just An American Band, which was released early in 1984. Next, Brett Dodwell left the band to join the army, and Nicki Sicki's former Sick Pleasure bandmate Dave "Koko" Chavez took his place on bass. Verbal Abuse then embarked on a four month tour of the U.S. and Canada to promote their album and performed with numerous influential bands including Slayer, The Ramones, Agnostic Front, Murphy's Law, Reagan Youth, The Cro-Mags, Die Kreuzen, The Dead Kennedys, Poison Idea and Decry. After finishing their tour, Nicki Sicki decided to leave Verbal Abuse early in 1985 due to stylistic and creative differences, citing Joie's penchant for flamboyant wardrobe choices including a bolero, a cape and various scarves and bandanas tied around his legs and microphone stands, as well as his leanings toward a more glam metal musical style. Nicki returned to Houston and formed the band Afterbirth with original Verbal Abuse bassist Radi Kilowatt, guitarists Andy Schumman and Bill Barton and a drummer by the name of Kelp. Afterbirth played new original songs, written mostly by Nicki, which were stylistically similar to the hardcore direction of the Just An American Band LP, and also performed a few old favorites from that record.

=== Scotty Wilkins years (1985–1995) ===
After Nicki Sicki's departure, Verbal Abuse continued on without any original members and adopted a new musical style in an attempt to conform more to a thrash metal sound. The remaining members, Dave Chavez, Joie Mastrokalos, and Gregg James recruited vocalist Scotty Wilkins, who had recently done a very brief stint in the band Condemned to Death. Later they added Jason Shapiro as a second guitarist, but he left Verbal Abuse the following year to focus on his band Celebrity Skin.

In 1986 the group recorded the album V.A. Rocks Your Liver, which was produced by Sylvia Massy and released on Boner Records. Although the record's credits list Joie Mastrokalos as the only guitarist, at least three other guitarists appear on the recording. Jason Shapiro contributed significantly to the songwriting on the album and played on several tracks but wasn't credited. Performances by session guitarists Tom Flynn (of the band Fang) and Bill Collins also appear on the album uncredited.

Verbal Abuse continued to perform locally in California and toured the United States and Canada as well. In 1987 Mastrokalos left the band, and was replaced by Nicki Sicki's Afterbirth bandmate, Andy Schuman. Gregg James soon stepped down for family reasons, and was temporarily replaced by former Condemned to Death drummer Mike Chubka before eventually rejoining.

In 1989, drummer Chris Kontos replaced Gregg James as the permanent drummer, and the band embarked on a European tour, taking the place of the band M.D.C. who had been scheduled to play the tour but were unable to make the trip. Destiny Records had booked 38 shows across Europe in 42 days and requested a live recording from the tour, which was released as Passport – Verbal Abuse of America. The label sent the band back to Europe in 1990 to tour to promote the live record.

Verbal Abuse recorded another album in 1995 entitled Red, White and Violent, which was released on Century Media Records. This incarnation of the band toured one final time in support of the record and disbanded soon afterward, with no intention to ever reform.

=== Slayer releases Verbal Abuse cover songs, sparking new interest ===
In 1996, the thrash metal band Slayer released Undisputed Attitude, an LP featuring a collection of cover songs originally performed by many of the band's favorite punk rock acts. The record, which peaked at number 34 on the Billboard 200 album chart, included one or two songs each from several bands. But Verbal Abuse's music was featured heavily on the album, with Slayer performing five songs from the band's debut LP, Just an American Band: "Disintegration", "Free Money", "Verbal Abuse", "Leeches", and "I Hate You". A video for Slayer's version of "I Hate You" was well received by fans, many of whom were not familiar with Verbal Abuse's early material. Verbal Abuse, at the time a defunct band, suddenly received a massive surge of recognition and newfound interest when legions of Slayer fans worldwide were exposed to their music.

=== 2000 reunion, Nicki Sicki benefit concert ===
In 2000, Verbal Abuse reformed the Wilkins, Chavez, Schuman, Kontos lineup to play a single benefit concert with punk band Cell Block 5 at Annie's club in San Francisco for former vocalist Nicki Sicki as he was experiencing legal troubles.

=== Reformation with original vocalist Nicki Sicki (2004–present) ===
In 2004, Nicki Sicki, after having completed his legal obligations, decided to form a new lineup of Verbal Abuse in Houston with Ed Loco on lead guitar, his teenage son Ed Loco Jr. on drums Bubba Dennis on Guitar, and Nick Nobody on bass. This version of the band toured the east coast and played numerous west coast shows as well, including headlining the 2005 BOB Fest in Oakland. Ed Jr. quit the band during the tour to finish high school and was immediately replaced by drummer Geza Szent-Galy, formerly of Paul Baloff's post-Exodus project, Piranha. Upon completion of the tour, Verbal Abuse relocated to Oakland and were slated to record a cover of a song by the band Aggression to be released on a compilation album entitled Taking Out a Little Aggression. The Texas based members Ed Loco, Bubba Dennis, and Nick Nobody returned to Houston, and guitarist Greg Grimple and bassist Dave Chavez were brought in as session musicians to play on the recording, which was eventually released on July 24, 2007 on the Dr. Strange label. Soon after, Nick Nobody returned to California, but Dave Chavez asserted his position in Verbal Abuse as the permanent bassist although he had not been asked to officially rejoin the band. Even so, Nick conceded and Dave did assume the permanent position. Andy Schuman then returned to Verbal Abuse on guitar but soon left again and was replaced by Jess Aaron. Over the next few years the band's guitarist position changed hands several times with stints by Sean Sutton, Greg Elliot, Luke Skeels and a reappearance of Ed Loco.

In 2014, guitarist "Sick" Scott Stanton of the bands Necrosic, Glob and Mummification joined Verbal Abuse and played his first show with them alongside guitarist Ed Loco in a special one-off concert with this two-guitar lineup. The show was Ed Loco's final performance with the group. Upon Ed's departure, Sick Scott assumed full time guitar duty and is currently the band's only guitarist. As of 2022 this newest version of Verbal Abuse is still performing regularly, their set generally consisting of classic material from the Just An American Band LP, new material written by the current lineup, and a few songs by Nicki Sicki's various prior bands including Legionnaire's Disease, Sick Pleasure, Afterbirth and Humungus. The current version of Verbal Abuse does not play any of the material recorded with former vocalist Scotty Wilkins. The group is in the process of preparing new material to be recorded for an upcoming full-length record, which will be the first album with original vocalist Nicki Sicki since the band's debut LP was recorded in 1983.

As of 2023 the band was working on new music with the Ed Reyes Sr., and Ed Reyes Jr (Back on guitar and drums) recorded a new album “Hope is a Lack of Information “ under the Verbal Abuse name. Song from the album “Hope is a Lack of Information “ includes songs written between 2004 to present. The line up of that album no longer plays with Nicki Sicki, though Bubba Dennis’s band Toxic Origin returned Bubba Dennis to guitar with the rest of his band (Mark Hodges-drums , Mike Simmons-bass, and Greg Loyacano-lead guitar) as Verbal Abuse during 2025 starting with a 4 city Texas Tour with FANG. Though Toxic Origin in full didn’t tour outside of Texas with Nicki Sicki as Verbal Abuse, Bubba Dennis has stayed to play guitar and the rest of Toxic Origin has been playing local Houston and Texas shows.

=== Reissues ===
The band's first record was re-released on LP in 1996 and on CD in 2002 on Beer City Records. The CD also features a complete live recording from 1984. In 2014, the LP was also re-issued on red vinyl.

== Personnel ==
=== Current members ===
- Nicki Sicki – vocals (1981–1984, 2004–present)
- Mike Simmons (2025–present)
- Mark Hodges (2025–present)
- Bubba Dennis (2025–present)

=== Former members ===
Vocalists

- Scotty Wilkins (1984–1995, 2000)

Guitarists

- General Electric (aka G.E.) (1981–1982)
- Joie Mastrokalos (1982–1987)
- Jason Shapiro (1985–1986)
- Andy Schuman (1987–1995, 2006–2007)
- Ed Loco (2004–2005, 2012–2014)
- Bubba Dennis (2005)
- Jess Aaron (2007)
- Sean Sutton (2007)
- Greg Elliot (2007–2008)
- Luke Skeels (2009–2011)
- Greg Loyacano (2025)

Bassists

- Radi Kilowatt (1981–1983)
- Brett Dodwell (1983–1984)
- Nick Nobody (2004–2006)
- Dave Chavez
- Mike Simmons (2025–present)

Drummers

- John Glenn (1981–1983)
- Brian "Damage" Keats (1983)
- Bitchy Bill (1983)
- Gregg James (1983–1989)
- Mike Chubka (1988–1989)
- Chris Kontos (1989–1995, 2000)
- Ed Loco Jr. (2004–2005)
- Mark Hodges (2025–present)

== Discography ==
LPs

- Just an American Band, Fowl Records (1983)
- Rocks Your Liver, Boner Records (1986)
- Passport- Verbal Abuse of America Live in Berlin, Destiny Records (1989)
- Red, White & Violent, Century Media Records (1995)
- Just an American Band / Live in '84, Beer City Records (CD: 2002)
- Rocks Your Liver (and then some), Malt Soda Recordings (2006)

Compilations

- Them Boners Be Poppin compilation, Boner Records (1985)
- Rat Music for Rat People, Vol. 3, CD Presents (1987)
- Thrasher Vol. 10 Compilation (1988)
- Taking Out a Little Aggression (2007)
