= Fearless Iranians from Hell =

American hardcore punk and thrash metal group

- Origin: San Antonio, Texas, United States
- Genres: Hardcore punk, thrash metal
- Years active: 1983-1990
- Labels: Boner
- Past members: Amir Mamori Matthew McChesney

Fearless Iranians from Hell were a band from San Antonio, Texas. Founded in 1983, their sound was initially hardcore/punk and later changed to crossover/thrash metal.

The band was formed in 1983 by members of the group Marching Plague, who donned ski masks, posing as terrorists. Photographer John Cohen related that the original lineup only played three or four shows before the lineup started changing. Ras Matthew (born Matthew McChesney) was 16 when he sang for the group in the 1980s. He left the band, later becoming a Rastafarian and playing with the reggae group Buffalo Soldier.

Fearless Iranians from Hell signed to the Boner Records label. Their first release in 1986 was their self-titled 7" Fearless Iranians from Hell. The EP includes the songs "Blow Up the Embassy" and "Iranian Klan". "Blow Up The Embassy" has been covered by Birth A.D. and Ghoul. Their first full album, Die for Allah, was released in 1987. The album was also released under the Big Takeover label in Germany. Its cover featured an image of Ayatollah Khomeini. The song "Chant" from the album included lyrics in Azerbaijani. They released Holy War in 1988. Their third album, Foolish Americans, was released in 1990. A CD compilation Foolish Americans / Holy War / Die For Allah came out the same year and was re-released in 2002.

Fearless Iranians from Hell refused to do interviews. While most understood the band's anti-American sentiment to be sarcastic, the band members did once contact a lawyer over a website that was offering a bounty on the lives of the band members. The message delivered by FIFH was one that depicts a nation of Islamic radicals who are united in their fervor to see destruction in the west.

At least one musician from the band went on to join the Butthole Surfers. Their music is included in New York's ARChive of Contemporary Music.

== Discography ==
- Fearless Iranians from Hell (EP, 1986)
- Die for Allah (1987)
- Holy War (1988)
- Foolish Americans (1990)
- Peace Through Power (EP, 2008)
