= Kelly Bailey (composer) =

American sound designer

- Genres: Video game music, industrial, ambient, rock
- Occupations: Composer, game designer, sound designer, conceptual artist, programmer, vocalist
- Instruments: Guitar, keyboards, programming
- Years active: 1996–present

Kelly Bailey is an American composer, musician, programmer and sound designer. He was the senior game designer of sound and music at Valve until he left in 2011 with Mike Dussault to concentrate on their project, Sunspark Labs LLC. Valve composer Mike Morasky mentioned in February 2014 that Bailey had returned to Valve, but in a February 2016 article on Forbes it was reported that Bailey has founded his own company, IndiMo Labs, and that he is no longer working at Valve.

== Biography ==
When asked by The Gaming Liberty in a 2011 interview, Kelly was asked about his musical inspirations growing up.

I’ve always been a fan of much of the earliest electronic music. I’d say obviously from that era Brian Eno, Tangerine Dream, Synergy, Isao Tomita and Vangelis all influenced me. When I was growing up in New Zealand, I remember seeing a BBC clip of Emerson Lake and Palmer performing “Fanfare for the Common Man”. I just thought that huge analog synth looming over Emerson looked and sounded so cool -- I was hooked. I still find something totally unique about the sonic textures many of the early synth pioneers were able to create. At a time when a polyphonic synth setup could cost as much as several houses, I think it influenced the amount of time and thought invested in crafting unique sounds.

On the defunct Half-Life website, his function was described as follows: "Kelly did all of the music and sound effects for Half-Life, and wrote sound code to create character speech and DSP reverb effects."

On Valve's official website circa 1998, his function was described as follows: "Kelly, formerly a product unit manager at Microsoft, has a programming background that includes consumer multimedia, database engines, and networking. He created all the music and sound effects for Half-Life." As also stated on the website, he was the lead singer for the Seattle based band Lucy's Fishing Trip.

In addition to composing the soundtrack for Half-Life 2, Bailey was one of four Valve employees – the others being David Speyrer, Eric Kirchmer, and Greg Coomer – who served as facial models for Gordon Freeman's face in the game's promotional materials.

On Valve's official website circa 2010, his function was described as follows: "Kelly is Valve's senior audio producer, responsible for creating sound effects & music."

Around March 2011, Kelly Bailey left Valve with colleague Mike Dussault to work on their project Sunspark Labs LLC, launched in December 2010, developing iOS applications, their first being "Morfo", released in June 2011. The news caused some concern and displeasure from the Steam community due to the lack of any public farewell or notification regarding Bailey's departure. However, at a press conference in February 2014, Mike Morasky (the current composer at Valve), stated that Kelly Bailey was working with Valve again.

On 24 September 2015, a collection of new music composed by Bailey was released as a custom music kit in Counter-Strike: Global Offensive titled Hazardous Environments. The music kit's description states that it was "inspired by the darker side of the Half-Life universe".

On 18 March 2016, Forbes wrote that Bailey is no longer with Valve but that he has created his own video game company, IndiMo Labs, and that he had been spending sixteen hours a day for the previous seven months as the sole developer behind Vanishing Realms: Rite of Steel, a virtual reality video game with RPG elements for the HTC Vive. The game released as an early access title on Steam on 5 April 2016, the same day the HTC Vive was launched.

On 22 January 2020, Valve employee David Feise stated in a Reddit AMA that Mike Morasky, the sole composer of the then-upcoming Half-Life: Alyx, had consulted Bailey about his approach to the music of the Half-Life series and would likely honor his advice when composing the music for Alyx.

== Gear ==
In a 1996 interview with Planet Quake, Kelly Bailey was asked about his role working on Half-Life 1, and subsequently asked about his gear.

I do almost all of my music work out of my studio at home. Ok, here goes: I use a pair of Adats, a Soundcraft Ghost for mixing, a bunch of outboard Symetrix and Lexicon processors for dynamics and effects, and an Eventide Ultraharmonizer DSP4000 for pre/post processing and vocal effects. For keyboards I use a mix of older and newer stuff. I have an old Prophet 5, a Casio FZ-1, a Roland MKS-50 with a programmer and an Oberheim Matrix 6. For newer gear, the Roland JP-8000, MC303, and the Novation Bass Station are nice for creating new sounds quickly. I also have a little Korg 05/wR with a software programmer that can be coaxed into making some fat sounds (no analog filter tho). I'm pretty religious about not using presets, so I really favor the more programmable synths. A lot of the recording and arrangement happens inside a PC; I run Logic Audio 2.5 for digital recording, post-processing and midi arrangement. I use an Audiomedia III card for digital transfers to and from a Tascam DA-30 dat. For guitar I use my trusty Les Paul through a Marshall half-stack, with an Oberheim Echoplex on the fx loop.

== Discography ==
=== Video games ===
- Half-Life (1998)
- Half-Life 2 (2004)
- Half-Life 2: Episode One (2006)
- Half-Life 2: Episode Two (2007)
- Portal (2007)
- Counter-Strike: Global Offensive (additional music, 2015)
- Vanishing Realms: Rite of Steel (2016-2019)
