= Butterfly Love =

Studio album by Steel Pole Bath Tub
- Released: 1989
- Recorded: February 11 – 16, 1989
- Studio: Razor's Edge (San Francisco, CA)
- Genre: Noise rock, post-hardcore
- Length: 32:21
- Label: Boner
- Producer: Steel Pole Bath Tub

Steel Pole Bath Tub chronology
Butterfly Love (1989)	Lurch (1990)

Professional ratings
Review scores
Source	Rating
AllMusic	3/5 stars

Butterfly Love is the debut studio album by the American band Steel Pole Bath Tub. It was released in 1989 by Boner Records.

== Track listing ==
All tracks are written by Steel Pole Bath Tub.

Side one
No.	Title	Length
1.	"Time to Die"	3:39
2.	"I Am Sam I Am"	2:45
3.	"Welcome Aboard It's Love"	3:09
4.	"Bee Sting"	5:12

Side two
No.	Title	Length
1.	"Hey Bo Diddley"	2:55
2.	"Swerve"	3:15
3.	"Thru the Windshield of Love"	1:58
4.	"Heaven on Dirt"	6:39
5.	"Tear It Apart"	2:49

== Personnel ==
Adapted from the Butterfly Love liner notes.

Steel Pole Bath Tub

- Dale Flattum – bass guitar, sampler, vocals
- Mike Morasky – guitar, tape, vocals
- Darren Morey (as D.K. Mor-X) – drums, guitar, tambourine

Production and additional personnel

- Jonathan Burnside – engineering
- Steel Pole Bath Tub – production

== Release history ==
Region	Date	Label	Format	Catalog
United States	1989	Boner	CS, LP	BR15
