= Songs for Insects =

Studio album by Thought Industry
- Released: 1992
- Genre: Progressive metal, avant-garde metal, thrash metal
- Length: 64:04
- Label: Metal Blade
- Producer: Dave Ogilvie and Thought Industry

Thought Industry chronology
Songs for Insects (1992)	Mods Carve The Pig: Assassins, Toads and God's Flesh (1993)

Songs for Insects is the debut album for American progressive metal band Thought Industry. It was released in 1992 through Metal Blade Records, was produced by Dave "Rave" Ogilvie, and features as cover art "Soft Construction with Boiled Beans (Premonition of Civil War)" by Spanish surrealist Salvador Dalí.

== Critical reception ==
Professional ratings
Review scores
Source	Rating
AllMusic	2.5/5 stars
Rock Hard	9/10
Sputnikmusic	4.5/5 stars

In 2005, Songs for Insects was ranked number 335 in Rock Hard magazine's book The 500 Greatest Rock & Metal Albums of All Time.

== Track listing ==
All songs written by Oberlin/Donaldson/Lee/Enzio; lyrics by Oberlin.

No.	Title	Length
1.	"Third Eye"	4:28
2.	"Songs for Insects"	9:23
3.	"Cornerstone"	3:58
4.	"Daughter Mobius"	5:10
5.	"Alexander vs. the Puzzle"	5:49
6.	"Ballerina"	2:34
7.	"The Chalice Vermillion"	10:07
8.	"The Flesh Is Weak"	6:45
9.	"Blistered Text and Bleeding Pens"	7:55
10.	"Bearing an Hourglass"	7:55

== Personnel ==
- Dustin Donaldson: acoustic drums, cymbals, sampled percussion, industrial devices
- Christopher Lee: fretted and fretless guitars, sampling keyboard
- Brent Oberlin: vocals, fretted, fretless and distorted bass, Chapman stick, piano, keyboards
- Paul Enzio: 6 + 7 string guitars
- Produced by Dave Ogilvie and Thought Industry
