= Mods Carve the Pig: Assassins, Toads and God's Flesh =

Mods Carve The Pig: Assassins, Toads and God's Flesh

Studio album by Thought Industry
- Released: 1993
- Genre: Progressive metal, avant-garde metal, thrash metal, alternative metal
- Label: Metal Blade
- Producer: Ken Marshall and Thought Industry

Thought Industry chronology
Songs For Insects (1992)	Mods Carve The Pig: Assassins, Toads and God's Flesh (1993)	Outer Space Is Just a Martini Away (1996)

Professional ratings
Review scores
Source	Rating
Allmusic	4.5/5 stars
Sputnikmusic	5/5 stars

Mods Carve the Pig: Assassins, Toads and God's Flesh is the second album by Kalamazoo-based progressive metal band Thought Industry. It was released in 1993 on Metal Blade Records and featured cover art from the Apotheosis of Homer by Spanish surrealist Salvador Dalí. Mods is the final Thought Industry release to include co-founder Dustin Donaldson.

== Track listing ==
All songs written by Dustin Donaldson, Brent Oberlin, Christopher Lee, and Paul Enzio. Lyrics by Brent Oberlin.

1. Horsepowered - 3:06
2. Daterape Cookbook - 4:34
3. Gelatin - 4:36
4. Jane Whitfield is Dead - 4:40
5. Boil - 5:47
6. Michigan Jesus - 1:46
7. Smirk the Godblender - 5:57
8. Republicans in Love - 6:14
9. Worms Listen - 5:18
10. Patiently Waiting for Summer - 6:29
11. To Build a Better Bulldozer - 6:43

== Personnel ==
- Dustin Donaldson - acoustic and electronic drums, percussion, metals, objects
- Brent Oberlin - vocals, fretted and fretless bass guitar, keyboards, harmonica
- Christopher Lee - left side fretless and standard guitars
- Paul Enzio - right side 6, 7 and 12 string guitars
- Ken Marshall and Thought Industry - production
