= Lurch (EP) =

EP by Steel Pole Bath Tub
- Released: 1990
- Recorded: Razor's Edge Recording (San Francisco, CA)
- Genre: Noise rock, post-hardcore
- Length: 27:47
- Label: Boner
- Producer: Steel Pole Bath Tub

Steel Pole Bath Tub chronology
Butterfly Love (1989)	Lurch (1990)	Lurch/Butterfly Love (1990)

Lurch is an EP by Steel Pole Bath Tub, released in 1990 by Boner Records.

== Track listing ==
All tracks are written by Steel Pole Bath Tub, except "Paranoid" by Geezer Butler, Tony Iommi, Ozzy Osbourne, Bill Ward.

Side one
No.	Title	Length
1.	"Christina"	8:45
2.	"Lime-Away"	5:35

Side two
No.	Title	Length
1.	"Hey You"	6:15
2.	"The River"	4:45
3.	"Paranoid" (Black Sabbath cover)	2:25

== Personnel ==
Adapted from the Lurch liner notes.

Steel Pole Bath Tub

- Dale Flattum – bass guitar, vocals
- Mike Morasky (as Mike Malmsteen) – guitar, vocals
- Darren Morey (as D.K. Mor-X) – drums

Additional musicians

- Jennifer DeFrancis – additional vocals (A1)

Production and additional personnel

- Billy Anderson – assistant engineering
- Jonathan Burnside – engineering
- Frank Grow – photography
- Steel Pole Bath Tub – production

== Release history ==
Region	Date	Label	Format	Catalog
United States	1990	Boner	CS, LP	BR20
