= I Am Spoonbender =

American musical group

- Also known as: Spoonbender 1.1.1
- Origin: San Francisco, California, U.S.
- Genres: Experimental music, krautrock, ambient, art rock, indie rock, progressive rock, electronic
- Years active: 1997–present
- Labels: Gold Standard Laboratories, Mint Records
- Members: Dustin Donaldson; Robynn Iwata
- Past members: Brian Jackson; Marc Kate
- Website: iamspoonbender.com

I Am Spoonbender is an American/Canadian multimedia group formed in San Francisco in early 1997.

Their musical style has been favorably compared to Brian Eno, Can, and This Heat, and touches on elements of neo-psychedelia, ambient music, electronic music, tape music, psychedelic folk, synth-pop, post-rock, post-punk, progressive, math rock, jazz, noise, pop, and musique concrete, with a distinctly experimental/avant-garde bent. Their sound has evolved over time and remains distinctive, making it difficult to place the group into a concise style or genre. Donaldson has noted that most of their influences are outside of music itself, although he has mentioned being inspired conceptually by Morton Subotnick, Wire, Laurie Anderson and Devo.

== History ==
I Am Spoonbender was formed in early 1997 by former Pansy Division drummer Dustin Donaldson with longtime friend Brian Jackson. About halfway through recording the band's debut album Sender/Receiver, Donaldson's girlfriend and former cub guitarist Robynn Iwata joined the group under the name "Cup" after moving to San Francisco from Vancouver, British Columbia, Canada. Sometime before the album's release, Marc Kate was also added to the lineup. The band set rules for itself that went against the grain of what was popular in music at the time, such as their "ban on guitars and references to religious icons." The members of the band co-owned the Seismic Seance recording studio.

The group would record one more EP with this lineup, Teletwin released on Gold Standard Laboratories in 2000 before Brian Jackson would leave the band to start his solo project Memory Systems.

Dave Edwardson of Neurosis was recruited as a session musician to record their second EP Shown Actual Size released in 2002.

Marc Kate left the band sometime in 2003.

Recording of their second studio album Buy Hidden Persuaders began in 2003 intended to be released as a fully visual album released on CD/DVD. The album was finished in 2004 but band was dropped from their label for unknown reasons before its release. Having trouble finding another label to put the project out, the band turned to fan-funding and the album was released on September 11, 2006 on buyhiddenpersuaders.com as three free-of-charge WAV files that fans were encouraged to burn to CD. Limited physical copies were released along with a video posted to the website and YouTube promoting the album. The video was pulled from YouTube on January 9, 2007 for unknown Community Guidelines violations and a shorter trailer was uploaded in its place. Due to poor archiving of the Buy Hidden Persuaders website, the original video is seemingly lost.

In April 2008, Donaldson went on a trip to Egypt with author Robert Bauval as research for I Am Spoonbender's third studio album tentatively titled Synundra Appundrum. Donaldson and Iwata have been back to Egypt several times since and have been in the Siwa Oasis since 2015. To date, this third album has never been released.

While not officially disbanded, the band has been on hiatus since around 2010.

== Members ==
=== Current members ===
- Dustin Donaldson: synths, drums, vocals, production (1997-present)
- Robynn "Cup" Iwata: synths, vocals (1997-present)

=== Past members ===
- Brian Jackson: bass, synths, (1997–2000)
- Marc Kate: synths (1998–2003)

=== Past session members ===
- Dave Edwardson (Neurosis): bass on Shown Actual Size, Buy Hidden Persuaders

=== Past live members ===
- Chad Amory: bass, synths (2000–2001)
- Kevin Farkas – 2nd drum set, synths
- Nolan Cook – bass and synths (The Residents, Dimesland)
- Drew Cook – bass and synths (Dimesland)
- MA'AT – perception management and subliminatexture

== Discography ==
Sender/Receiver	CD/ 12" picture disc	1998 (GSL), 1999 (Mint)	Gold Standard Laboratories (US), Mint Records (Canada)
Teletwin	3-sided 12" EP, CD	2000	Little Army Records (US), Mint Records (Canada)
Plastic Lips	7" single	2000	Contact (Japan)
Shown Actual Size	CD/12" EP	2002	Gold Standard Laboratories
Buy Hidden Persuaders	CD/Digital	2006	Mesmer Detector, Ltd (world)
Stereo Telepathy Academy (as Spoonbender 1.1.1)	CD	2006	Helen Scarsdale Agency (world)

== Live appearances ==
Live appearances are rare. In addition to their own shows, I Am Spoonbender has performed on bills with Mogwai, Glenn Branca, Cibo Matto, The New Pornographers, Wire, Money Mark, Einstürzende Neubauten, Hot Hot Heat, Steven Stapleton, Mike Patton, Secret Chiefs 3, Man or Astro-man?, The Locust, Siouxsie and the Banshees, Kid606, The Faint, Grandaddy, Trans Am, Pleasure Forever, Chrome, Ariel Pink, Notwist, Oneida, Tarentel, Fly Pan Am, Matmos, and Explosions in the Sky, among others.
