= King Buzzo (EP) =

EP by Melvins (King Buzzo)
- Released: August 1992
- Recorded: December 23, 1990, 1991
- Genre: Sludge metal, industrial
- Length: 13:53
- Label: Boner
- Producer: Barrett Jones, Buzz Osborne, and Dave Grohl

Melvins (King Buzzo) chronology
Salad of a Thousand Delights (1992)	King Buzzo (1992)	Dale Crover (1992)

Professional ratings
Review scores
Source	Rating
AllMusic	3/5 stars

King Buzzo is an EP by Melvins' guitarist Buzz Osborne, which was released in 1992 through Boner Records. Osborne recruited Nirvana drummer Dave Grohl for the project. Grohl is credited as "Dale Nixon", in reference to the pseudonym Greg Ginn adopted for playing bass on Black Flag's My War.

Osborne does not appear on "Skeeter" as it is a remix of the song "Just Another Story About Skeeter Thompson" that Grohl recorded for his Pocketwatch solo album. Skeeter Thompson was the bassist of Grohl's old band Scream.

The cover art for the album is a parody of the cover art from Gene Simmons' 1978 solo release.

Buzz Osborne has stated, according to a CMJ New Music article in 2005:

"The whole idea [to do Kiss-esque solo albums] was a joke that went out of control. Mine was recorded with Dave Grohl, who I haven’t talked to in years. I have no idea what he’s doing. <...>."

— Buzz Osborne, CMJ New Music Weekly

== Track listing ==
All songs written by Buzz Osborne and Dale Nixon.

No.	Title	Length
1.	"Isabella"	3:15
2.	"Porg"	4:02
3.	"Annum"	4:29
4.	"Skeeter"	2:03

== Personnel ==
- King Buzzo – lead vocals, guitar, bass, producer (all tracks 1–3)
- Dale Nixon – drums (1–4); lead vocals, guitar, bass, producer (all track 4)
- Barrett Jones – producer, engineer
- Harvey Bennett Stafford – cover and insert painting
