= Fang (band) =

American punk rock band

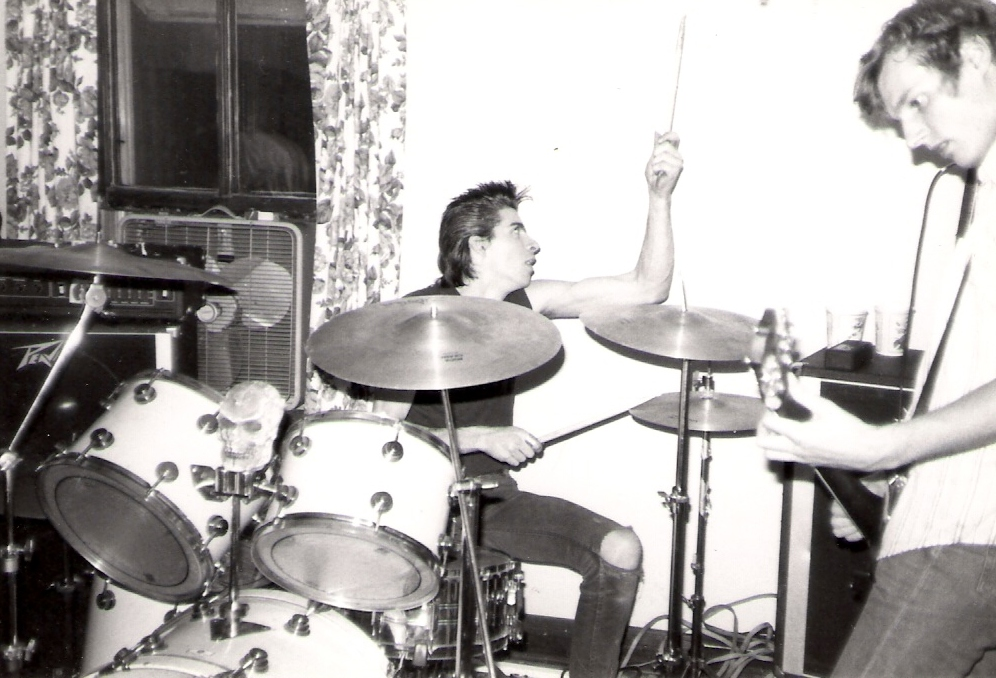
- Fang performing in 1983. Left to right: Tim Stiletto and Tom Flynn. Vocalist Sam McBride and bassist Chris Wilson are not visible.

Background information
- Origin: Berkeley, California, U.S.
- Genres: Hardcore punk, punk rock
- Years active: 1980–1989, 1995–present
- Labels: Boner, National Trust, Wingnut, Malt Soda, Die Laughing
- Members: Sam McBride; Brandon Brown; Steven Gonzales McCarthy; Justin Mccawley
- Past members: Tom Flynn; Bill Collins; Joe Miller; Tim Stiletto; Chris Wilson; Brian Beattie; Mike Branum; Josh Levine; Skot Nelson; Chris Ritter; Jimmy Crucifix; Brian Schopflin; Mat McCoy; Justin Werth; Larry Tamez; Turner Babcock; Bubba Dennis; Kevin Henderson; Tommy Gone Sour; Obadiah Stephen Bowling; Nicki Sicki; Mike 86d

Fang is an American hardcore punk band from the early East Bay punk rock scene, established in Berkeley, California, in 1980.

== History ==
The band's first record under the name Fang was an "experimental record", according to the band; this was the "Yukon Fang" single. Fang guitarist Tom Flynn and bass player Brian Beattie, his former bandmate from the bands Tapeworm and Safety Patrol, put out "Yukon Fang" as a duo, and Fang was formed.

The original incarnation of Fang toured the country once, only to break up shortly thereafter with Beattie moving on to Texas where he later formed the band Glass Eye. In the early fall of 1981, Flynn began playing with drummer Chris Ritter. They soon added bass player Chris Wilson and began playing shows in the Bay Area as a three piece, with Flynn on vocals. While this was happening, Sam McBride, the band's soon-to-be vocalist, was singing with future Fang drummer Greg Langston in the band Shut Up. In early 1982, Ritter was replaced with drummer Joel Fox, and at Fox's audition he brought along his friend McBride, who volunteered to be the band's singer. The line-up solidified as McBride (vocals), Chris Wilson (bass), Tom Flynn (guitar), and Joel Fox (drums). Together they contributed the song "Fun with Acid" to the Not So Quiet on the Western Front compilation album.

Shortly thereafter, guitarist Tom Flynn founded the label Boner Records and released Fang's debut eight-song album Landshark and their 10-song follow-up Where the Wild Things Are. Tim Stiletto drummed on the latter. These two releases are now considered classic East Bay punk.

The original line-up of Fang dissolved in 1985 after the departure of founder Tom Flynn (Who went on to found a band known as Antler Family). Sammytown carried on the band, recruiting a new line-up of Bill Collins (guitar), Joe Miller (bass), and Steve Chinn (drums). Flynn and Boner Records remained affiliated with the band, putting out the first tracks by the new line-up on a Boner Records compilation, Then Boners Be Poppin' in 1985. In January 1986, the "Spun Helga" LP was recorded in West Germany with McBride singing vocals, and two Germans named Joe (guitar) and Ollie (drums) playing instruments. We Bite Records released the LP in Germany, and in the US it was handled by National Trust Records. Fang next release was 1987's A Mi Ga Sfafas? (literally, "Give Me Head?").

In 1988/89, drummer Mike Branum replaced Chinn. Fang then recorded the album Pissed Off Buddah, which remained unreleased until 2008, when it was released with Fang's other albums Spun Helga and A Mi Ga Sfafas?

In 1989, Sam McBride – while running an acid-dealing business – murdered his girlfriend, a crime for which he was convicted and served six years in prison. According to an L.A. Weekly article dated February 8, 2017:

In 1989, Sammytown killed his girlfriend, Dixie Lee Carney, suspecting that she was working with a different acid dealer to take all of his business. In a drug-addled rage, he crushed Carney's neck with his bare hands. She was 24. Sammytown went on the run for six months before he was captured. He was sentenced to 11 years for voluntary manslaughter and served six before being released.

== Reformation ==
In 1989, Boner Records released Fang's first compilation album, Landshark/Where the Wild Things Are. The album included Fang's debut album and debut EP.

After a long break, Fang regrouped in 1995 and released the "Electric Chair" single on Man's Ruin Records in 1997. The line-up at this time included Sam McBride (vocals), Greg Langston (drums), Bill Burnett (guitar) and Josh Levine (bass). This incarnation of the band recorded the American Nightmare LP on Wingnut Records.

In 1999, Jim Martin, formerly of Faith No More, joined on guitar and recorded four songs for the Hello Records CD Fish and Vegetables, which was released as a split LP by fellow punk rock groups Dr. Know and Hellions.

In May 2000, Sammytown and Jim Martin, along with Casey Orr (Gwar, Rigor Mortis) on bass, and Dallas drummer Clint Phillips (The American Fuse) performed two shows in Texas, one at Trees Dallas, and a sold-out show at Emo's in Austin.

By 2001, the band was composed of Sammytown, Brian Schopflin (bass), Jonny Manak (guitar), Alby Wasted (guitar), and Ike Eichensehr (drums). Sammytown, Brian, Jonny, Alby and Ike also started the Resistoleros, an Oakland-based rock 'n' roll band. Steel Cage Records released the Resistoleros CD Rock 'N Roll Napalm in 2003.

In 2004, the Pissed Off 7" picture disc came out as a split label release on Delta Pop Music and Malt Soda Records, consisting of 4 tracks from the as of yet unreleased 1988 Pissed Off Buddha recording session. These songs were alternate takes to the ones that would later come out on the triple album CD in 2011. Delta Pop did a limited sleeve numbered out of /50 copies that were mostly given out to friends and band.

Later in 2004, the Live Cheap CD came out on Malt Soda Recordings, featuring Sammytown (vocals), Brian Schopflin (bass), Ike Eichensehr (drums), Alby Wasted (guitar) and Jimmy Crucifix (guitarist for 1980s hardcore band Crucifix and hard rock band Proudflesh) also on guitar. This is the only Fang recording with two guitarists.

In 2004, the band toured the United States. Sammytown, Jimmy Crucifix (guitar), Brian Schopflin (bass), Bubba Dennis (bass) and Ike Eichensehr (drums) toured as Fang in the spring of 2004 and as the Resistoleros and Fang in November 2004 with Greg Elliott on rhythm guitar.

In January 2005, Sammy, Jimmy, Brian and Ike recorded a cover of Agression's (1980s hardcore–Nardcore band) song "Salty Leather" for a tribute to Agression members Mark Hickey and Henry Knowles, who had died. Dave Haro and JellyRoll came up with the idea for the tribute. The CD, Taking Out a Little Agression, was released on Dr. Strange Records in 2007 and featured bands including JFA, McRad, DI, Ill Repute, Dr. Know, Verbal Abuse, MDC, Oppressed Logic, Shattered Faith, and Dave Haro & JellyRoll's band KatKiller.

From 2005 to 2008, Fang performed with the steady line-up of Sammytown, Jimmy Crucifix, Brian Schopflin, and Greg Langsten (returning to the drums). 2008 also marked the year Sammytown formed the Disciples, a raw mix of hard rock, which recorded the album Redemption in 2009. The Disciples consisted of Sammytown (vocals), Jamey Dangerous (drums), Scary Larry Tamez (bass), J-Stain Werthless (lead guitar; originally from punk outfit Diesel Boy), and Mat "The Kid" McCoy (guitar), the line-up which also emerged in 2010 as the current line-up for Fang. After countless live shows and touring, the band wrote and recorded "Here Come the Cops", which included contributions from original member Tom Flynn, who has re-emerged and played live with the band on at least one occasion in 2012.

In 2011, Malt Soda released the double disc CD Pissed Off Buddha, comprising three Fang albums: Spun Helga, A Mi Ga Sfafas?, and Pissed Off Buddha, the latter being a previously unreleased album recorded in 1988. A live DVD of the band was also included with the release.

A new album, Here Come the Cops, was released by Malt Soda in 2012. In summer of 2013, the band released a split 7-inch with Whidbey Island WA's Potbelly, on PB Records.

2014 saw the band appearing on a limited edition split 12-inch alongside Symbol Six with two exclusive new songs, including a cover of "Riot in Cell Block #9". The EP was released as an exclusive Record Store Day release via Jailhouse Records. In 2017 Die Laughing Records teamed with Fang to release the Sylvia Massy mixed record "Rise Up!" which was released August 2017 and followed up with a vinyl pressing in 2019.

In 2016 Sammytown and founding Fang guitarist Tom Flynn started playing together for the first time in 30 years under the name "Cornelius Asperger and the Bi-Curious Unicorns" alongside bassist Dave Chavez and drummer Stark Raving Brad. They released an eponymous album later that year on Reptilian Records.

== Legacy ==
Fang has gone on to influence an array of West Coast bands, and has been instrumental in the hardcore punk movement. Guitarist Tom Flynn's distinct guitar playing has also influenced many followers, including those in the grunge genre. This may be because his record label, Boner Records, released three albums by Aberdeen, WA. band, The Melvins between 1989 and 1992. They came from the same town as Kurt Cobain who, when he made a list of his top 50 albums, put Landshark at number 6.

Fang has been covered by many high-profile bands. The most enduring composition by the group, "The Money Will Roll Right In", has been covered by several groups including Metallica back in 1985 (see the two instrumental versions on 2017 Deluxe Box Set of "Master of Puppets").

Live recordings of the song which were published later were made on August 30, 1992 by Nirvana (see "Live at Reading") and February 10, 1993 by Mudhoney. Initially only released on a promo CD for their tour that year, this version would be released in 2020 on their "Real Low Vibe" album.

During the summer of 1993, the Butthole Surfers covered the song several times when playing live, but this cover version has never been officially released by the band.

In 2024, Tom Flynn said that whilst he knew about the Mudhoney cover of the song in the '90s, he was not aware of Nirvana's version until he was approached by their record company to release it in 2009.

Another of the band's popular tracks, "I Wanna Be on TV", was covered by Green Day on their 2002 compilation LP, "Shenanigans".

== Discography ==
=== LPs ===
- Landshark! (Boner Records, 1982)
- Where The Wild Things Are (Boner Records, 1983)
- Spun Helga (National Trust Records, 1985)
- A Mi Ga Sfafas? (Boner Records, 1986)
- Pissed Off Buddha (Malt Soda Records, 2011, recorded 1988)
- American Nightmare (Wingnut Records, 1998)
- Fish and Vegetables - released by Fang, Dr. Know, and Hellion (Hello Records, 2000)
- Here Come the Cops (Malt Soda Recordings, 2012)
- Rise Up! (Die Laughing Records, 2017)
- No Warning Shots Fired (Fang Records, 2023)

=== Singles and EPs ===
- "Enjoy the View" / "Yukon Fang" (1981)
- "Pissed Off" (Delta Pop Music / Malt Soda, 2004, recorded 1988)
- "Hair Of The Dog" (Man's Ruin, 1997)
- Fang/Oppressed Logic split 7-inch - Skinheads Smoke Dope with a Cheap Beer Hangover (Beer City Records, 1998)
- Fang/Potbelly split 7-inch (PB Records, 2013)
- Fang/Symbol Six split 12-inch EP (Jailhouse Records, 2014)
- "Guillotine" 10" (Malt Soda, 2026)

=== Appearances ===
- "Fun with Acid" - Not So Quiet on the Western Front compilation (Alternative Tentacles Virus 14, 1982)
- "They Sent Me to Hell C.O.D." - Rat Music For Rat People, Vol.2 compilation (CD Presents, 1984)
- "Red Threat" and "Fun With Acid (Ill Version)" - Life is a Joke compilation (Weird System, 1984)
- "Johnny Puke" and "Better Off Dead" - Them Boners be Poppin' compilation (Boner Records, 1985)
- "Police on My Back" - Backlash, The Clash tribute compilation (Dwell, 1999)
- "Salty Leather" - Taking Out A Little Agression, Agression tribute compilation (Dr. Strange Records, 2007)
- "Skinheads Smoke Dope with a Cheap Beer Hangover" - Fang/Oppressed Logic split 7-inch (Beer City Records, 1999)
- "We Die Alone" appears in the movie The Ranger (directed by Jennifer Wexler) released 2018, from album Rise Up! (Die Laughing Records, 2017)

=== Live and compilations ===
- Landshark/Where the Wild Things Are (Boner Records, 1989)
- "Electric Chair" (Boner Records, 1995)
- "Hair of the Dog" (Man's Ruin Records, 1998)
- Live Cheap CD (Malt Soda Recordings, 2004)
- Pissed Off Buddha (2-CD set comprising three albums - Spun Helga, A Mi Ga Sfafas? and Pissed Off Buddha) (Malt Soda Recordings, 2011)
