= Milk Cult =

American electronic music group

- Origin: San Francisco, California, U.S.
- Genres: Electronic, industrial rock
- Years active: 1990–2000
- Labels: Boner, Priority
- Members: Eric Holland; Dale Flattum; Mike Morasky

Milk Cult was an American San Francisco-based electronic band. Founded as a studio-only project in 1990, the band's nucleus comprises musicians Dale Flattum, Eric Holland and Mike Morasky. Morasky and Flattum are also known for being founding members of the noise/industrial rock group Steel Pole Bath Tub, which the duo continued their involvement with concurrent to Milk Cult. Milk Cult is known for their found-sound experiments and dense sample-based compositions, as well as their collaborations with numerous musical acts, including Faith No More, Jawbreaker, Grotus, Neurosis, Thinking Fellers Union Local 282 and The Geraldine Fibbers.

== History ==
Milk Cult was founded in 1990 and issued their debut album, titled Love God in 1992 on Boner Records. The album contained music inspired by the group's score for the Frank Grow film of the same title. Burn or Bury followed in 1994 and featured the collaborative efforts of Mike Patton, Billy Gould, Lars Fox, Carla Bozulich, Blake Schwarzenbach, Paul Reller, Dave Edwardson, Scott Kelly and Steve Von Till. Bruse Lee Marvin Gaye was released in 1995 and featured music recorded in 1994 with Japanese musicians Masaya Nakahara, Hideki Yoshimura, Hidekazu Miyahara and Pop Suzuki.

In 1997, Milk Cult was contacted by the French government and offered an opportunity to participate in a Marseille-based art collective. The group obliged and traveled to France to record for a year, with their efforts eventually surfacing as the material for their fourth album. Titled Project M-13, the album featured numerous guests and embraced world music while continuing to experiment with sampling and hip hop beats.

After the release of Project M-13 the members of Milk Cult devoted themselves to separate projects. Morasky turned his focus to movie special-effects and worked as a technician on The Lord of the Rings films. Continuing the found-sound experiments of Milk Cult but in a more accessible form, Flattum and former Steel Pole Bath Tub drummer Darren Morey formed Novex, who released an album titled Kleptophonica in 2002. Eric Holland released his debut solo album Borders, Battles & Beers in 2010 and continues to work as a music engineer, recording with musical acts such as Mike Patton and his band Tomahawk.

== Discography ==
- Love God (Boner Records, 1992)
- Burn or Bury (Priority Records, 1994)
- Bruse Lee Marvin Gaye (ZK Records, 1995)
- Project M-13 (0 To 1 Records, 2000)
