= Steel Pole Bath Tub =

American rock band

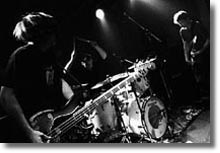

Background information
- Also known as: S.P.B.T., Steelpole Bathtub
- Origin: Bozeman, Montana, United States
- Genres: Noise rock, hardcore punk
- Years active: 1986–2002, 2008–present
- Labels: Boner, Slash, Alternative Tentacles, Lookout!, Mans Ruin, Sympathy for the Record Industry, Zero to One, Sento, Your Choice, Genius Records, Numero Group
- Past members: Mike Morasky; Dale Flattum; Dorothy Kent; Nate Howe/Jim Beach

Steel Pole Bath Tub is an American rock band, formed in 1986 in Bozeman, Montana, United States, by Mike Morasky (guitar/vocals) and Dale Flattum (bass/vocals).

== Band history ==
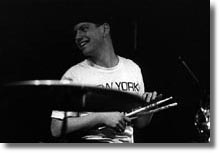
Darren Mor-X

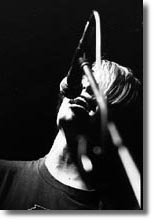
Dale Flattum

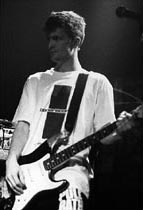
Mike Morasky

Formed in Bozeman, Montana in 1986 by Mike Morasky and Dale Flattum, the duo soon moved the band to Seattle, Washington, where they recruited drummer Darren Mor-X of early noise punk band Mr. Epp and The Calculations to join them. The group stuck around in Seattle for a while before relocating to San Francisco, California in 1988.

The band became known for their chaotic, noisy style and frequent use of television and movie samples, with several 7" singles and albums on Boner Records, becoming a mainstay of the San Francisco music scene.

Before being signed to Slash Records and releasing their major label debut in 1995, their signing to Slash was part of a mid-1990s free-for-all signing bonanza of alternative rock bands, particularly bands from the Northwestern United States in the wake of the surprising commercial success Geffen Records had with Nirvana, many of which ended in creative and ownership conflicts. Steel Pole Bath Tub and Slash's relationship was no different. The band opened for Faith No More during most of the King for a Day... Fool for a Lifetime American and Canadian tour from April 20 to May 24, 1995.

The only album released on Slash contained few samples, which had previously been a staple of the band, at the insistence of Slash's legal department. The band hoped their second album for Slash would be a cover of The Cars' first album in its entirety, but the label would not allow that idea, and then deemed the demos the band submitted (which contained three Cars covers) unlistenable and refused to release them.

The band would not release any more significant material until the rights to the music they recorded for Slash reverted to them in 2002. In 2002, the band released those recordings as the album Unlistenable, the title a play on a Slash executives comments on the material, and reformed to play the Beyond the Pale festival at the DNA Lounge in San Francisco in November 2002, where they co-headlined with Neurosis and Tarantula Hawk.

They reunited to play a show at the Doug Fir Lounge in Portland, Oregon, on September 4, 2008, as a part of MusicFestNW. The group's song "Train to Miami", from the album The Miracle of Sound in Motion, was featured in a November 2008 television advertisement for the PC and Xbox 360 game, Left 4 Dead. Mike Morasky is also responsible for writing and performing the songs by the fictional band, Midnight Riders, in the game's sequel, Left 4 Dead 2.

On August 11, 2023, Steel Pole Bath Tub released their first music since 2002 in the form of "The Skulls Tape", a re-release of an early cassette. The band also once again reunited, this time at Rockefeller's in Houston, TX to perform at a reunion celebration for the rock club Emo's on September 9, 2023. Noah Landis joined the band for keys, samples, and sound effects throughout the set. The songs "Black Eye Fixer", "Action Man Theme", and "The Seventh Hour of the Seventh Day" also featured children of the original band members on keys and percussion.

Straddling the punk, noise, art and grunge scenes, Steel Pole Bath Tub was a touring staple. Between the years 1986 and 1997, SPBT shared the stage with dozens of bands, including The Flaming Lips, Sonic Youth, Firehose, Meat Puppets, Neurosis, Christ on Parade, Jawbreaker, Operation Ivy, Econochrist Melt Banana, Crash Worship, Thinking Fellers Union Local 282 Grotus and Ethyl Meatplow. They were also closely associated with the Seattle scene, playing often with such acts as Mudhoney, L7, Tad, and Hole, and touring Europe with Melvins, as well as performing a string of early tour dates with Nirvana. Steel Pole Bath Tub toured the United States incessantly and traversed Europe and Japan several times.

== Side projects ==
The band joined with Jello Biafra to form the group Tumor Circus, releasing a self-titled album in 1991.

Milk Cult, with Morasky and Flattum (and sound man Eric Holland) using the names The Bumblebee and C.C. Nova, released four albums between 1992 and 2000. Their last album, Project M13, was the result of an invitation from the French Government to be guests of the La Friche Art Collective in Marseille.

Novex, a Dale Flattum and Kent project, recorded with Vern and Justin at the Unwound farm, which was released as Kleptophonica (2002).

The Hand is a side project including Dale Flattum and Zak Sally of Low.

== Discography ==
=== Steel Pole Bath Tub ===
==== Cassettes ====
- 1986 – Steel Pole Bath Tub (Demo, self-released)
- 1987 – We Own Drrrills (EP, self-released)

==== Albums ====
- Butterfly Love (Boner Records, 1989)
- Lurch (Boner Records, 1990)
- Tulip (Boner Records, 1990)
- The Miracle of Sound in Motion (Boner Records, 1993)
- Your Choice Live Series 019 (Your Choice Records, 1993)
- Best of Steel Pole Bath Tub (Sento, 1993)
- Scars from Falling Down (Slash/London, 1995)
- Unlistenable (Zero to One, 2002)

==== Eps and singles ====
- "I Dreamed I Dream" – Split 7'/10" With Melvins – (Boner/Tupelo, 1989)
- "Arizona Garbage Truck" / "Voodoo Chile" (Sympathy for the Recording Industry, 1990)
- "European Son" / "Venus in Furs" (The Communion Label, 1991)
- "We Walk" – Split 7" with Jawbreaker – (Staple Gun Records, 1991)
- "Your Choice Live" – Limited 7" – (Your Choice Records, 1991)
- "Bozeman" (Boner/Tupelo, 1992)
- "Some Cocktail Suggestions EP" (Boner/Tupelo, 1994)
- "Tragedy Ecstasy Doom and So On EP" (Genius Records, 1995)
- "Auf Wiedersehen" / "Surrender" (Man's Ruin Records, 1995)
- "Twist" / "Surrender" (Slash Records, 1995)
- "Hey Bo Diddley Live in Tokyo" – Split 7" with Unwound – (Honey Bear Records, 1996)
- "Soul Cannon" – "Live at Emo's: Volume 2 – #2: This Place Sucks" – Split 7" with "Unsane" / "Gomez" – (No Lie Records, 1997)
- "The Skulls Tape" – Re-release of early cassette (No Coast, 2023)

==== Compilations ====
- "Bee Sting" – The Thing That Ate Floyd – (Lookout! Records, 1988)
- "We Walk" – Surprise Your Pig – A Tribute to R.E.M. – (Staple Gun Records, 1992)
- "Chemical Warfare" – Virus 100 – (Alternative Tentacles, 1992)
- "Down All the Days" – The Mission District: 17 Reasons – 7" Box (Mission Merchants, 1992)
- "Kung Fu Love" – Milk for Pussy – (Mad Queen Records, 1993)
- "Froggie Would a Wooing Go" – Power Flush – as "Mud Bath" with Mudwimmin – (Broken Rekids, 1993)
- "The Seventh Hour of the Seventh Day" – Smitten – A Love Song Compilation – (Karate Brand Records, 1994)
- "A Washed Out Monkey Star Halo" – Dope-Guns-'N-Fucking In The Streets Volume Ten – (Amphetamine Reptile Records, 1994)
- "The 500 Club" – CMJ New Music August – Volume 24 – (College Music Journal, 1995)
- "Twist" – Introducing Vol. 2 – (Indigo, 1995)
- "Twist" – London Records (London Records, 1995)
- "The Charm" – Jabberjaw... Pure Sweet Hell – (Mammoth, 1996)
- "The Ghost" – Twisted Willie – (Justice Records, 1996)
- "A Washed Out Monkey Star Halo" – Dope-Guns-'N-Fucking In The Streets Volumes 8–11 – (Amphetamine Reptile Records, 1997)
- "Soul Cannon" – Live at Emo's BOX SET – 7" Box (No Lie Music, 1997)
- "I Dreamed I Dream" – Confuse Yr Idols (A Tribute To Sonic Youth) (Narnack Records, 2004)

=== Milk Cult ===
==== Albums ====
- Love God (Boner Records / Tupelo Recording, 1993)
- Burn or Bury (Priority Records, 1994)
- Bruse Lee Marvin Gaye (ZK Records, 1994)
- Project M-13 (Zero to One Records, 2000)

==== EPs and singles ====
- "Mama Paranoia" – Split 7" with Dosed Bernie – (Box Dog, 1994)

=== Tumor Circus ===
==== Albums ====
- Tumor Circus (Alternative Tentacles, 1991)

==== EPs and singles ====
- "Take Me Back or I'll Drown Our Dog" – 7'/12" – (Alternative Tentacles, 1991)
- "Meathook Up My Rectum" – 7' – (Alternative Tentacles, 1991)

==== Compilations ====
- "Meathook Up My Rectum" – The Bat is Back – (Alternative Tentacles, 1992)

=== C.C. Nova ===
- 1994 – Milk Cult C.C. Nova Dispatch (Communion)
