= Boner Records =

American independent record label

- Founder: Tom Flynn
- Genre: Hardcore punk, heavy metal, punk rock
- Country of origin: United States
- Location: Berkeley, California

Boner Records was an American independent record label in Berkeley, California, owned by Tom Flynn. Between 1982 and 1993, Boner released recordings by Fang (Flynn's band), Verbal Abuse, MDC, Boneless Ones, Duh, Steel Pole Bath Tub, Melvins, The Warlock Pinchers, Hell's Kitchen, and Superconductor.

== Discography ==
=== Melvins ===
- Ozma (1989)
- Bullhead (1991)
- Eggnog (1991)
- Lysol (1992)

==== Buzz Osborne ====
- King Buzzo (1992)

==== Dale Crover ====
- Dale Crover (1992)

==== Joe Preston ====
- Joe Preston (1992)

=== Fang ===
- Landshark (1982)
- Where The Wild Things Are (1983)
- A Mi Ga Sfafas? (1987)
- Landshark/Where the Wild Thing Are (1989)

=== MDC ===
- Metal Devil Cokes: It's The Real Thing (1989)

=== Verbal Abuse ===
- Rocks Your Liver (1986)

=== Fearless Iranians from Hell ===
- Fearless Iranians from Hell 7" (1986)
- Die for Allah (1987)
- Holy War (1988)
- Foolish Americans (1990)
- Foolish Americans/Holy War/Die for Allah CD (1990)

=== Hell's Kitchen ===
- If You Can't Take The Heat (1988)

=== Steel Pole Bath Tub ===
- Butterfly Love (1989)
- Lurch (1989)
- Tulip (1991)
- The Miracle of Sound in Motion (Boner/Tupelo) (1993)

==== Milk Cult ====
- Love God (Boner/Tupelo) (1992)

=== Ed Hall ===
- Albert (1988)
- Love Poke Here (1990)

== See also ==
- List of record labels
