= Mike Morasky =

American composer and artist (born 1964)

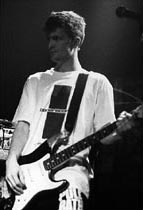
- Morasky in 1991

Background information
- Born: Mike Morasky; June 14, 1964 (age 62); Detroit, Michigan, U.S.
- Genres: Orchestral, electronica, musique concrete, ambient, dark ambient, noise rock, hardcore punk
- Occupations: Composer, musician, visual effects artist
- Instruments: Electric guitar, vocals
- Years active: 1986—present

Mike Morasky (born June 14, 1964) is an American composer, visual effects artist, director and programmer. He composed the scores for the Valve games Team Fortress 2, the Left 4 Dead series, Portal 2, Counter-Strike: Global Offensive, Half-Life: Alyx and Counter-Strike 2. He worked on visual effects for the Lord of the Rings and Matrix films, and founded the underground art bands Steel Pole Bath Tub, Milk Cult and DUH.

== Biography ==
For Valve, Morasky composed the music for Team Fortress 2, Portal (with Kelly Bailey), Left 4 Dead, Left 4 Dead 2 (including composing and playing the guitar, keyboard and bass for the fictional hard rock band Midnight Riders), Portal 2, Counter-Strike: Global Offensive, Half-Life: Alyx, and Counter-Strike 2.

He also worked as a senior visual effects artist and technical director on The Lord of the Rings and The Matrix film trilogies.

Morasky was part of the now-defunct hardcore punk/noise rock band Steel Pole Bath Tub, which he founded in 1986 with Dale Flattum. S.P.B.T. disbanded in 2002.

== Filmography ==
=== Visual effects ===
- The Lord of the Rings: The Fellowship of the Ring (2001) (lead massive crowd technical director)
- The Lord of the Rings: The Two Towers (2002) (senior massive technical director)
- The Matrix Reloaded (2003) (lead technical director)
- The Matrix Revolutions (2003) (sentinel/swarm lead)
- The Lord of the Rings: The Return of the King (2003) (senior massive technical director)
- Catwoman (2004) (CG supervisor)
- Drawing Restraint 9 (2005) (lead technical director)
- Pirates of the Caribbean: Dead Man's Chest (2006) (digital artist)

== Awards ==
- "Outstanding Achievement in Original Music Composition" - "Portal 2" - Academy of Interactive Arts and Sciences - (2012)
- "Best Audio" - "Portal 2" - Game Developers Choice Award - (2012)
- "Best Interactive Score" - "Portal 2" - Game Audio Network Guild - (2012)
- "Best Dialog" - "Portal 2" - Game Audio Network Guild - (2012)
- "Best Original Vocal Song - Pop" - "Portal 2" - Game Audio Network Guild - (2012)
- "Best Game Music of 2011" - "Portal 2" - Kotaku - (2012)
- "Best Soundtrack (Nomination)" - "Portal 2" - X-Play - (2011)
- "Best Sound Design (Nomination)" - "Portal 2" - X-Play - (2011)
- "Outstanding Creative Achievement / Interactive Entertainment Sound Production (Nomination)" - "Portal 2" - TEC Awards - (2012)
- "Best Original Score (Nomination)" - "Portal 2" - Spike TV Video Game Awards - (2012)
- "Audio of the Year (Nomination)" - "Portal 2" - Game Audio Network Guild - (2012)
- "Sound Design of the Year (Nomination)" - "Portal 2" - Game Audio Network Guild - (2012)
- "Best Cinematic / Cut Scene Sound (Nomination)" - "Left 4 Dead 2" - Game Audio Network Guild - (2010)
- "Best Use of Multi-Channel Surround in a Game (Nomination)" - "Left 4 Dead 2" - Game Audio Network Guild - (2010)
- "Best Use of Sound" - "Left 4 Dead" - What If Gaming - (2008)

== Presentations and papers ==
- "Left 4 Dead" - Game Audio Network Guild Summer Summit (2010)
- "Matrix Revolutions: Techniques and Methodologies With Large Scale Sentinel 'Swarm' Scenes" - Silicon Valley ACM Siggraph (2004)
- "Matrix Sequels: Animation and Pipeline Methodologies in Large CG Film Productions" - San Francisco ACM Siggraph Student Chapter (2004)
- "Wiring Cracker: The Mechanics of a Non-Anthropomorphic, Real-Time, Performance Animation Puppet" - ACM Siggraph (1998)

== Discography ==
=== Film ===
- Dopamine (2003) (guitar)
- One Winter Story (2006)
- I Die Daily: The Making of Matthew Barney's 'Cremaster Cycle' (2007)
- Life in Flight (2008)
- Ayiti Mon Amour (2016)

=== Video games ===
Year	Title	Notes
2007	Team Fortress 2	—N/a
2007	Portal	With Kelly Bailey
2008	Left 4 Dead	—N/a
2009	Left 4 Dead 2	—N/a
2010	Alien Swarm	—N/a
2011	Portal 2	—N/a
2012	Counter Strike: Global Offensive	—N/a
2020	Half-Life: Alyx	—N/a
2022	Aperture Desk Job	
2023	Counter-Strike 2	
2024	Little Kitty, Big City	

=== Steel Pole Bath Tub ===
==== Albums ====
- Butterfly Love (Boner Records, 1989)
- Lurch (Boner Records, 1990)
- Tulip (Boner Records, 1990)
- The Miracle of Sound in Motion (Boner Records, 1993)
- Your Choice Live Series 019 (Your Choice Records, 1993)
- Best of Steel Pole Bathtub (Sento, 1993)
- Scars from Falling Down (Slash/London, 1995)
- Unlistenable (Zero to One, 2002)

==== Eps and Singles ====
- "I Dreamed I Dream" - Split 7'/10" With Melvins - (Boner/Tupelo, 1989)
- "Arizona Garbage Truck / Voodoo Chile" (Sympathy for the Recording Industry, 1990)
- "European Son / Venus in Furs" (The Communion Label, 1991)
- "We Walk" - Split 7" with Jawbreaker - (Staple Gun Records, 1991)
- "Your Choice Live" - Limited 7" - (Your Choice Records, 1991)
- "Bozeman" (Boner/Tupelo, 1992)
- "Some Cocktail Suggestions EP" (Boner/Tupelo, 1994)
- "Tragedy Ecstasy Doom and So On EP" (Genius Records, 1995)
- "Auf Wiedersehen / Surrender" (Man's Ruin Records, 1995)
- "Twist / Surrender" (Slash Records, 1995)
- "Hey Bo Diddley Live in Tokyo" - Split 7" with Unwound - (Honey Bear Records, 1996)
- "Soul Cannon" - "Live at Emo's: Volume 2 - #2: This Place Sucks" - Split 7" with "Unsane" / "Gomez" - (No Lie Records, 1997)

==== Compilations ====
- "Bee Sting" - The Thing That Ate Floyd - (Lookout! Records, 1988)
- "We Walk" - Surprise Your Pig - A Tribute to R.E.M. - (Staple Gun Records, 1992)
- "Chemical Warfare" - Virus 100 - (Alternative Tentacles, 1992)
- "Down All the Days" - The Mission District: 17 Reasons - 7" Box (Mission Merchants, 1992)
- "Kung Fu Love" - Milk for Pussy - (Mad Queen Records, 1993)
- "Froggie Would a Wooing Go" - Power Flush - as "Mud Bath" with Mudwimmin - (Broken Rekids, 1993)
- "The Seventh Hour of the Seventh Day" - Smitten - A Love Song Compilation - (Karate Brand Records, 1994)
- "A Washed Out Monkey Star Halo" - Dope-Guns-'N-Fucking In The Streets Volume Ten - (Amphetamine Reptile Records, 1994)
- "The 500 Club" - CMJ New Music August - Volume 24 - (College Music Journal, 1995)
- "Twist" - Introducing Vol. 2 - (Indigo, 1995)
- "Twist" - London Records (London Records, 1995)
- "The Charm" - Jabberjaw... Pure Sweet Hell - (Mammoth, 1996)
- "The Ghost" - Twisted Willie - (Justice Records, 1996)
- "A Washed Out Monkey Star Halo" - Dope-Guns-'N-Fucking In The Streets Volumes 8-11 - (Amphetamine Reptile Records, 1997)
- "Soul Cannon" - Live at Emo's BOX SET - 7" Box (No Lie Music, 1997)
- "I Dreamed I Dream" - Confuse Yr Idols (A Tribute To Sonic Youth) (Narnack Records, 2004)

=== Milk Cult ===
==== Albums ====
- "Love God" (Boner Records / Tupelo Recording, 1993)
- "Burn or Bury" (Priority Records, 1994)
- "Bruce Lee Marvin Gaye" (ZK Records, 1994)
- "Project M-13" (Zero to One Records, 2000)

==== Eps and Singles ====
- "Mama Paranoia" - Split 7' With Dosed Bernie - (Box Dog, 1994)

=== Tumor Circus ===
==== Albums ====
- Tumor Circus (Alternative Tentacles, 1991)

==== Eps and Singles ====
- "Take Me Back or I'll Drown Our Dog" - 7'/12" - (Alternative Tentacles, 1991)
- "Meathook Up My Rectum" - 7' - (Alternative Tentacles, 1991)

==== Compilations ====
- "Meathook Up My Rectum" - "The Bat is Back" - (Alternative Tentacles, 1992)

==== Albums ====
- Blowhard (Boner Records, 1991)
- The Unholy Handjob (Alternative Tentacles, 1995)

=== Producer/Engineer ===
- Jawbreaker - "Chesterfield King" EP (Communion/Tupelo, 1991)
- Jawbreaker - Bivouac (Communion/Tupelo, 1991)
- Warlock Pinchers - Circusized Peanuts (Boner Records, 1991)
- Blister - Glitches (1992) (Executive Producer)
- Tumor Circus - Tumor Circus (Alternative Tentacles, 1991)
- Jello Biafra - I Blow Minds for a Living (Alternative Tentacles, 1991)
