= Casual Party =

Single by Band of Horses

from the album Why Are You OK
- Released: April 24, 2016
- Genre: Indie rock
- Length: 3:53
- Label: American; Interscope
- Songwriter(s): Ben Bridwell
- Producer(s): Jason Lytle

Band of Horses singles chronology
"Hang an Ornament" (2014)	"Casual Party" (2016)

Music video
- "Casual Party" on YouTube

"Casual Party" is the lead single taken from American rock band Band of Horses' fifth studio album Why Are You OK. Peaking at #4 on the Adult Alternative Songs chart and #23 on the Alternative Songs chart, it is their most successful song to date.

== Chart performance ==
=== Weekly charts ===
Chart (2016)	Peak position
Iceland (RÚV)	7
US Hot Rock & Alternative Songs (Billboard)	35
US Rock Airplay (Billboard)	19
US Alternative Airplay (Billboard)	23
US Adult Alternative Songs (Billboard)	4

=== Year-end charts ===
Chart (2016)	Position
US Adult Alternative Songs (Billboard)	13
