= Hang an Ornament =

Single by Grandaddy and Band of Horses
- Released: 17 December 2014
- Genre: Indie rock
- Length: 5:20
- Songwriter: Jason Lytle

Grandaddy singles chronology
"Elevate Myself" (2006)	"Hang an Ornament" (2014)

"Hang an Ornament" is a song by American indie rock bands Grandaddy and Band of Horses, released as a single on December 17, 2014.

== Release ==
The single is the first collaboration released between Grandaddy and Band of Horses. With the release of the song, Band of Horses announced that Grandaddy’s Jason Lytle would be producing their next album, "Why Are You OK."
