= Last Place (album) =

Studio album by Grandaddy
- Released: March 3, 2017
- Genres: Indie rock; indie pop
- Labels: 30th Century Records; Columbia
- Producer: Jason Lytle

Grandaddy chronology
Just Like the Fambly Cat (2006)	Last Place (2017)	Sophtware Slump ..... On a Wooden Piano (2020)

Singles from Last Place
- 1. "Way We Won't" Released: September 9, 2016; 2. "A Lost Machine" Released: December 2, 2016; 3. "Evermore" Released: January 13, 2017

Last Place is the fifth studio album by the American indie rock band Grandaddy, released on March 3, 2017, on 30th Century Records. Self-produced and recorded by the band's frontman and primary recording artist Jason Lytle, the album is the first by Grandaddy since Just Like the Fambly Cat (2006) and the band's prior break-up.

Lyrically inspired by Lytle's divorce, the album was preceded by the singles "Way We Won't", "A Lost Machine" and "Evermore". This is the final album to feature Kevin Garcia on bass, as he would die of a stroke two months after its release.

== Background ==
In 2006, Jason Lytle dissolved Grandaddy prior to the release of the project's fourth studio album, Just Like the Fambly Cat. Moving from Modesto, California to Montana, Lytle reflected, "I was unhealthy, I was unhappy, I was overwhelmed with the travel. All of the demands and stuff. I’m just not really suited to that kind of living. At that time I’d relocated out to Montana, and I’d become very happy and accustomed to my new pace of life." During this time, Lytle released two studio albums under his own name, Yours Truly, the Commuter (2009) and Dept. of Disappearance (2012), while guitarist Jim Fairchild joined Modest Mouse, and released four solo albums under the name All Smiles.

In 2012, Grandaddy reunited for a limited number of summer shows. The idea of reuniting was suggested by Fairchild, with Lytle noting: "He suggested that we consider playing some shows, and I went, 'No', [but] he convinced me it might be a good idea." The shows inspired Lytle to consider reactivating Grandaddy on a more permanent basis and to record a new studio album: "I think because [the 2012 reunion] was so brief—it was just, like, two weeks of all these festivals — that I could wrap my head around everything that was happening. We had our old crew with us and we had some cool vacation time that went along with it. It was just like, 'Alright, let’s just see what happens.' Maybe, subconsciously, something got planted in my head at that point. Right now it’s still an experiment, y’know? It could very well end up being this terrible mistake, but at some point I got into the idea of making a record and I got into the idea of really investing myself into making record."

== Recording ==
Lytle briefly started working on the album in Montana, where he and his wife had moved after Grandaddy's initial break-up, and recorded the majority of the material in Portland, while going through their subsequent divorce: "The majority of it happened there, which coincidentally was also this period where I was in the middle of this big transitional personal shakeup — a changing-of-the-guard kind of situation. My big joke now is like, 'Don’t try working on or finishing a record that you’re completely obsessed with while going through a divorce, living in one of the cloudiest, rainiest regions of the country, when you’re prone to depression and vitamin D deficiency.'"

== Writing and composition ==
Comparing writing and recording process of Last Place and his Grandaddy material to that of his solo albums, Yours Truly, the Commuter (2009) and Dept. of Disappearance (2012), Jason Lytle noted, "I think I welcome being a bit more vague and mysterious with the lyrical stuff with Grandaddy. [...] There’s definitely a concerted effort from me, almost in a cool exercise, to try to make ‘em sound like Grandaddy songs. Especially when all of the options that you have gear-wise and software-wise and just having progressed as far as having become a better musician or a better engineer. It was kind of nice for me to go back to Grandaddy school."

Much of the album's lyrical content is largely concerned with Lytle's divorce from his wife, and their prior move to Portland: "I was with this person for over a decade, and we got married for a little bit. There were all kinds of problems, and moving was sort of an attempt to maybe fix things. But all it really did was just pull the veil off, pull the blanket, open up the curtains and all the light sort of shown in on what was going on. Portland was the beginning of the end, and then it was just a matter of survival at that point."

== Critical reception ==
Professional ratings
Aggregate scores
Source	Rating
AnyDecentMusic?	7.5/10
Metacritic	76/100
Review scores
Source	Rating
AllMusic	4/5 stars
The A.V. Club	B
The Guardian	4/5 stars
The Independent	4/5 stars
The Irish Times	4/5 stars
Mojo	3/5 stars
Pitchfork	6.0/10
Q	3/5 stars
Record Collector	4/5 stars
Uncut	9/10

Upon release, Last Place received positive reviews by music critics.

== Track listing ==
All tracks are written by Jason Lytle.

No.	Title	Length
1.	"Way We Won't"	4:22
2.	"Brush with the Wild"	4:08
3.	"Evermore"	4:40
4.	"Oh She Deleter :("	0:53
5.	"The Boat is in the Barn"	4:38
6.	"Chek Injin"	2:09
7.	"I Don't Wanna Live Here Anymore"	2:33
8.	"That's What You Get for Gettin' Outta Bed"	3:36
9.	"This is the Part"	4:26
10.	"Jed the 4th"	2:05
11.	"A Lost Machine"	6:02
12.	"Songbird Son"	4:19

- Note: "Oh She Deleter" is on CD and digital album only

== Charts ==
Chart (2017)	Peak position
Belgian Albums (Ultratop Flanders)	12
Belgian Albums (Ultratop Wallonia)	43
Dutch Albums (Album Top 100)	82
French Albums (SNEP)	78
Irish Albums (IRMA)	31
New Zealand Heatseekers Albums (RMNZ)	7
Scottish Albums (Official Charts)	10
Swiss Albums (Schweizer Hitparade)	51
UK Albums (Official Charts)	18
US Billboard 200	150
