= Things Are Great =

Studio album by Band of Horses
- Released: March 4, 2022
- Genre: Indie rock
- Length: 41:09
- Label: BMG
- Producers: Ben Bridwell; Wolfgang Zimmerman

Band of Horses chronology
Why Are You OK (2016)	Things Are Great (2022)

Singles from Things Are Great
- 1. "Crutch" Released: October 12, 2021; 2. "In Need of Repair" Released: November 30, 2021; 3. "Lights" Released: January 19, 2022; 4. "Warning Signs" Released: March 4, 2022

Things Are Great is the sixth studio album by indie rock band Band of Horses, released on March 4, 2022, on BMG. The album was initially produced by Grandaddy's Jason Lytle, who produced the band's previous studio album, Why Are You OK (2016), and Dave Fridmann, but was later reworked by frontman Ben Bridwell and producer Wolfgang Zimmerman.

Recorded without longtime members, Tyler Ramsey (guitar) and Bill Reynolds (bass), who were both fired from the group in 2017, the album's sessions featured new bass guitarist Matt Gentling and guitarist Ian MacDougall. MacDougall departed from the band two months prior to the album's release, and was replaced by Brett Nash.

The album received generally positive reviews, with many praising it as a return to form and most calling it their best album in over a decade. The album was preceded by the singles "Crutch", "In Need of Repair" and "Lights".

== Critical reception ==
Professional ratings
Aggregate scores
Source	Rating
AnyDecentMusic?	7.6/10
Metacritic	79/100
Review scores
Source	Rating
AllMusic	4/5 stars
Clash	7/10
Classic Rock	4/5 stars
DIY	3.5/5 stars
Mojo	4/5 stars
Paste	7.8/10
Pitchfork	7.3/10
PopMatters	6/10
Rolling Stone	3.5/5 stars
Uncut	8/10

Things Are Great was released to a positive reception from contemporary music critics. At Metacritic, which assigns a normalized rating out of 100 to reviews from mainstream critics, the album received an average score of 79, based on 13 reviews, which indicates "generally favorable reviews". Aggregator AnyDecentMusic? gave it 7.6 out of 10, based on their assessment of the critical consensus.

Pitchfork gave the album a 7.3 out of 10 rating, writing, "Band of Horses' sixth album unexpectedly delivers on all the qualities that defined their initial success: soaring emotions, crunchy guitars, and Ben Bridwell's cotton-candy whine." Timothy Monger of AllMusic wrote, "Band of Horses play to their strengths here on what feels like a solid return to form." Ross Horton of The Line of Best Fit concurred, writing, "Things Are Great is certainly a return to their best form, and it shows signs of the band entering a new golden era with the next one." Andy Fyfe of Mojo and Ben Salmon of Paste called it the band's best album in over a decade, with Chris Hamilton-Peach of DIY calling it their "sharpest raft of material since Cease to Begin."

In a mixed review, Justin Cober-Lake of PopMatters wrote, "Bridwell has a very clear vision for his band and presents it well. His smart lyrics match his previous standards, and the group execute the album well, but it feels too much as if they're standing in place."

== Track listing ==
All tracks are written by Ben Bridwell, except where noted.

No.	Title	Writer(s)	Length
1.	"Warning Signs"	Ben Bridwell; Ryan Monroe	4:20
2.	"Crutch"		3:43
3.	"Tragedy of the Commons"		4:58
4.	"In the Hard Times"	Bridwell; Wolfgang Zimmerman	4:15
5.	"In Need of Repair"	Bridwell; Jason Lytle; Monroe	3:56
6.	"Aftermath"		4:08
7.	"Lights"		3:35
8.	"Ice Night We're Having"		4:21
9.	"You Are Nice to Me"		3:57
10.	"Coalinga"	Bridwell; Sam Farrar; Brantley Gutierrez; Harrison Kipner	3:56
Total length:			41:09

== Personnel ==
Credits adapted from the album's liner notes and Tidal.

Band of Horses

- Benjamin Bridwell – vocals, guitar, production (all tracks), drums (7, 9), additional recording (8); engineering, baritone guitar, bass, synthesizer, ukulele (9), back cover image
- Creighton Barrett – drums (1–10)
- Ryan Monroe – guitar (1, 2, 5, 6, 10), keyboards (1, 5, 10), organ (4), Rhodes piano (6), electric guitar (7, 9)
- Matt Gentling – bass (1–7, 9, 10)
- Ian MacDougall – acoustic guitar (2), electric guitar (2, 6–8), guitar (3, 5)

Additional personnel

- Wolfgang Zimmerman – production, engineering (all tracks); guitar (4–6)
- Jason Lytle – additional production (all tracks), guitar (3, 5, 10), keyboards (5, 10), percussion (10)
- Dave Sardy – additional production, mixing (all tracks); keyboards, noises (4); acoustic guitar, tambourine (7); sound effects, timpani (9); baritone vocals, drums, guitar (10)
- Dave Fridmann – additional production (all tracks), keyboards (2, 4), organ (2, 4, 5)
- Stephen Marcussen – mastering
- Robert Cheek – engineering
- Robert Cheek – acoustic guitar (3, 10)
- Christian Chidester – electric guitar (7)
- Brantley Gutierrez – vocals (10)
- Sam Farrar – engineering assistance
- Michael Fridmann – engineering assistance (1–3)
- Pam Smith – front cover image
- Cody Ackors – art direction, design

== Charts ==
Chart performance for Things Are Great
Chart (2022)	Peak position
Austrian Albums (Ö3 Austria)	71
Belgian Albums (Ultratop Flanders)	13
Belgian Albums (Ultratop Wallonia)	85
Dutch Albums (Album Top 100)	67
French Physical Albums (SNEP)	99
German Albums (Offizielle Top 100)	32
Portuguese Albums (AFP)	43
Scottish Albums (Official Charts)	10
Spanish Albums (Promusicae)	49
Swiss Albums (Schweizer Hitparade)	42
UK Albums (Official Charts)	67
UK Independent Albums (Official Charts)	7
US Billboard 200	138
US Independent Albums (Billboard)	19
US Top Rock Albums (Billboard)	21
