= Kramies =

American singer-songwriter (born 1974)

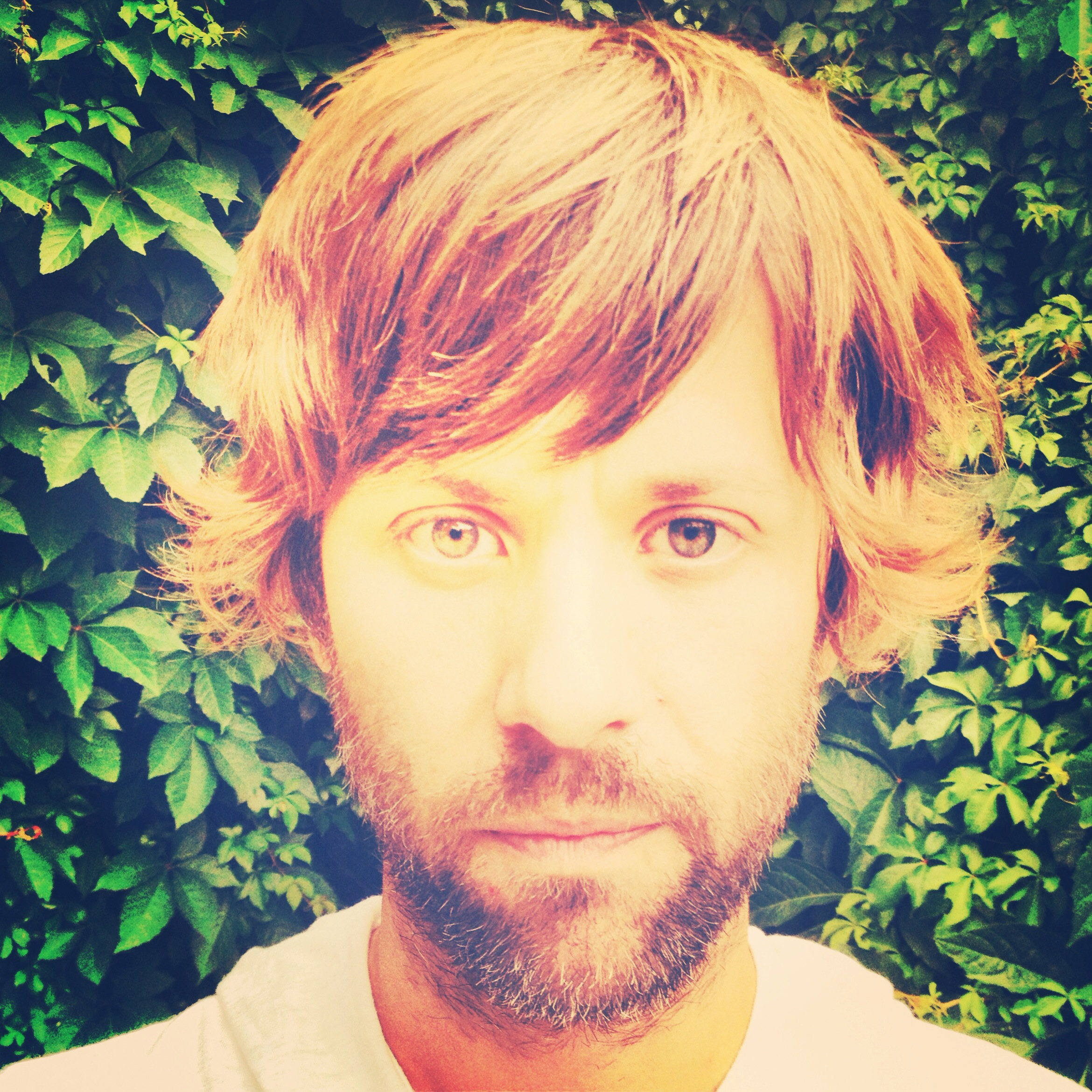
- Kramies in 2013

Background information
- Born: 1974 (age 51–52)
- Origin: Ohio, USA
- Genres: Folklore, Dreampop, Dreamfolk, Indie folk
- Occupations: Singer, Songwriter, Composer, Artist
- Instruments: Vocalist, guitar, piano, synths, keyboards
- Years active: 1992–present
- Label: Hidden Shoal Recordings VanGerrett Records
- Website: kramies.com

Kramies (pronounced Kraim-iss) is an American singer-songwriter, best known for his work with producers Jason Lytle of Grandaddy, Patrick Carney of The Black Keys, Jerry Becker of Train, and Todd Tobias of Guided by Voices. He has also performed with artists such as Spiritualized, Yo La Tengo, Calexico, and Tyler Ramsey formally of Band of Horses. Kramies has been awarded multiple Songs of the Year as well as EP of the year. His current two 2021 singles "Days Of" & "Ohio I’ll Be Fine" entered the US & Canadian collage charts as a Top 10. On September 9, 2022, Kramies released his first self-titled full-length LP, which gained him five Top Albums of the 2022 and two Songs of the Year. After extensive touring overseas and recording Kramies is currently working on a new EP and several soundtracks for 2023–2024. In 2025 Kramies teamed up with Grammy winning producer Mario J. McNulty best known for his work with David Bowie for what is already being called his best work to date. Kramies’ new album “Goodbye Dreampop Troubadour” release October of 2025.

October 2026 Kramies was listed in SPIN Magazine as Top 15 Artist/Songs for his newest single “We’re All Dead”. Which also premiered in Magnet Magazine

== Discography ==
- The European the autumn sessions Ireland release (2010)
- Coal Miners Executive Club Single (2011)
- The European official EP Release (2011)
- The Wooden Heart Single (2013)
- The Wooden Heart Official EP Release (2013)
- Sea Otter Cottage Single (2013)
- The Folklore Sessions EP Release (2014)
- The Fate That Never Favored Us Single (2015)
- forêts antiques EP Live at The Grand Théâtre (2015)
- Into The Sparks Single featuring Alma Forrer (2016)
- I Wish I Missed You Single (2017)
- Everything The End Single (2018)
- Of All the Places Been & Everything the End EP (2018)
- 3ingle split with Jason Lytle of Grandaddy and Kyle Field (musician) of Little Wings (2018)
- 3ingle ~ Live in SLO with Jason Lytle and Kyle Field (musician) live from California EP (2019)
- Between the Moon Split with Foxtails Brigade (2019)
- Legend Of The Willow soundtrack for French fairytale (2021)
- Days Of 2021 single feat. Patrick Carney and Jason Lytle
- Ohio I’ll Be Fine 2021 single
- Over and Outsider split single with Jason Lytle and Tyler Ramsey (2022)
- Hotel in LA 2022 single
- Kramies LP 2022
- ‘’Social Light’’ single 2024
- ‘’Hollywood Signs’’ single 2025
- ‘’Goodbye Dreampop Troubadour’’ 2025
- ‘’We’re All Dead’’ single October 2026
