= Excerpts from the Diary of Todd Zilla =

Excerpts From the Diary of Todd Zilla

EP by Grandaddy
- Released: September 27, 2005
- Genre: Indie rock
- Length: 31:14
- Label: V2
- Producer: Jason Lytle

Grandaddy chronology
Below the Radio (2004)	Excerpts From the Diary of Todd Zilla (2005)	Just Like the Fambly Cat (2006)

Excerpts from the Diary of Todd Zilla is an EP by American indie rock band Grandaddy, released on September 27, 2005 through record label V2.

According to frontman Jason Lytle, the EP was "a way to fill the gaps of time while recording Just Like the Fambly Cat". The EP received a mixed-to-favorable response from music critics.

== Title and theme ==
The EP's title reflects frontman Jason Lytle's frustration with his hometown, Modesto, California, and has been described as "not so much a farewell as a fuck off to the town". The name comes from something Lytle saw on the vanity license plate of a large truck in Modesto. In Lytle's words, the EP "was a nice opportunity for me to produce some whiney little complaining songs about my hometown. I think it's pretty blatant; it's pretty stripped down in terms of the message." It was recorded simultaneously with Just Like the Fambly Cat, and Lytle planned to leave Modesto as soon as the album was complete, stating "In Modesto, it's like gravity is a lot heavier. There's something that just makes you feel like you're doing all you can just to keep your head above water, when in fact there's not a whole lot going on." He recorded the EP as "a way to fill the gaps of time while recording the new album. I just thought I could throw together some old songs and some newer ones and a really new one".

== Recording ==
Todd Zilla was recorded on 8-track equipment at one of Lytle's two home studios. Its eight tracks do not appear on the band's fourth full-length album, Just Like the Fambly Cat. Some of the songs had been written much earlier, as far back as ten years before, as Lytle stated: "There are years-long gaps between a lot of these songs, and mostly they were just annoying me because they were sitting around doing nothing." Everything on the EP was written and recorded by Lytle with the exception of drum tracks by Aaron Burtch.

== Release ==
Excerpts from the Diary of Todd Zilla was released on September 27, 2005 by record label V2. A limited-pressing vinyl edition was released by record label Devil in the Woods, containing the bonus track "Hidden Health Announcement".

== Reception ==
Professional ratings
Review scores
Source	Rating
AllMusic	favorable
Drowned in Sound	5/10
Hot Press	favorable
The Michigan Daily	favorable
Pitchfork	5.6/10
Spin	B+

Excerpts from the Diary of Todd Zilla received mixed-to-favorable reviews from critics.

Marc Hogan of Pitchfork gave it 5.6/10, calling it "a goofy, sloppy mini-album, cramming familiar Weezer fuzz, stoned piano ballads, playful analogue synths, and misguided Bad Company references into a little more than half an hour". Gareth Dobson of Drowned in Sound gave it five out of ten, calling it a "mixed bag". Spin gave it a B+ rating, calling it "richly illustrated, grim but empathetic, epic yet humane art rock". In the view of Joey Lipps of The Michigan Daily, "it falls short of the captivating quality of their previous recordings". Shilpa Ganatra of Hot Press opined that the EP represented "a wander into the field of revolution rather than evolution".

== Track listing ==
All tracks are written by Jason Lytle.

No.	Title	Length
1.	"Pull the Curtains"	2:59
2.	"At My Post"	6:08
3.	"A Valley Son (Sparing)"	4:50
4.	"Cinderland"	3:20
5.	"Fuck the Valley Fudge"	3:39
6.	"Florida"	4:37
7.	"Goodbye?"	5:41

Exclusive vinyl edition bonus track
No.	Title	Length
8.	"Hidden Health Announcement" (contains a locked groove)
