= Andrew Lynch (singer-songwriter) =

American singer-songwriter

Andrew Lynch (born in Soldotna, Alaska) is a singer-songwriter, trumpeter, keyboard player, audio engineer, and music producer, who lives in Los Angeles, California. In 2004, he released his debut album Samaritopia with the help of Pat Boone and Bill Hudson. The album features Sebastian Steinberg and The Section Quartet, who he occasionally performs with at Largo. He is a former band member of Los Angeles indie rock band The Black Pine.

In the fall of 2007, Lynch toured with Earlimart in support of their record Mentor Tormentor, playing keyboards and trumpet. In late 2007, he continued working with the band, playing horns on, engineering, and producing their 2008 record, Hymn and Her. The following year, he recorded The Section Quartet's debut film score, music for Drew Barrymore's directorial debut, Whip It. In 2010, Lynch recorded and mixed songs for hardcore punk supergroup Off!'s First Four EPs. In the same year, he also independently released his first full-length album "Sun Incisions," which features members of Eels, Earlimart, Film School, and The Black Pine.

Lynch has been a band member and engineer for both of actor Adam Goldberg's music projects, first playing in LANDy and later in The Goldberg Sisters, with whom he appeared on The Late Late Show with Craig Ferguson on June 7, 2011, playing piano.

In 2015, Lynch signed to Dangerbird Records with his new electronic solo project, nav/attack, to release the eponymous debut album. To accompany the album, Lynch wrote, directed, and edited a series of interlocking music videos entitled "TVN1" starring Goldberg.
