= The Black Pine =

American alternative rock band

- Origin: Los Angeles, California
- Genres: Alternative Rock, Indie Rock, Soft Rock, Dream Pop, Shoegaze, Neo-Psychedelia
- Years active: 1999–present
- Labels: The New Black; June le Fit Records
- Members: Mitch Cichocki; Emma Kathan
- Past members: Jason Bacher; Adeline Fargier Jasso; Nate Farringer; James Scott Rubia; Ian Latchmansingh; Vanessa Irena Pomiechowski; Dani Anderson; Andrew Lynch; Troy Von Balthazar; Daphne Chen; Michael Panes
- Website: blackpinemusic.com

The Black Pine is an American alternative rock band from Los Angeles, California. They formed in 1999 and have released six albums.

== History ==
The Black Pine consists mainly of Mitch Cichocki (guitar, lead vocals), Jason Bacher (bass guitar), and Emma Kathan (drums, guitar, vocals).

Other members include: Adeline Fargier Jasso, Nathaniel Farringer, Ian Latchmansingh and James Scott Rubia.

The Black Pine formed in 1999 in Los Angeles, CA. They played their first show in 2000 at Los Angeles club, Spaceland, with Lou Barlow and Chokebore. In summer 2002, The Black Pine released its first E.P. entitled The Sexlife of Flowers. The band worked with the actor/director Adam Goldberg to score two of his films, Running with the Bulls, which was premiered on the Independent Film Channel in 2003, and I Love Your Work, which starred Christina Ricci, Giovanni Ribisi, Jason Lee and Franka Potente. The Black Pine also played as the backing band for the comedian Sarah Silverman's one woman show, "Sarah Silverman: Jesus Is Magic", performed at Second City in Los Angeles and The Canon Theater in Beverly Hills, California. The band released its second album, With Us, on the independent label, The New Black, founded by the Los Angeles band, The Antarcticans. Two songs from the album "With Us" : Early Morning and Focus 6 were featured in the film "Under Still Waters" starring Lake Bell, Jason Clarke, and Clifton Collins Jr. . The band's third album, "Still Life" was released in September 2008 on June le Fit records. "The Morning Sun", the band's fourth album was self released in February 2012.

Members of The Black Pine played on Troy Von Balthazar's album "How To Live On Nothing", released on Third Side Records in 2010 and Troy Von Balthazar sang on the song, "Paradise" from The Black Pine album "Still Life".

Members of The Black Pine played with the actor/director/musician Adam Goldberg under the name LANDy; the title of the album is Eros and Omissions, and was released in June 2010 on Apology Music Records.

Guitarist from The Black Pine: Adeline Fargier Jasso toured with Cat Power as guitarist and backup singer for the Sun album released 2012. Adeline also toured as a guitarist and backup singer with Troy Von Balthazar. Adeline also appears on the upcoming Cat Power record Covers.

In 2018 The Black Pine released a single with two songs "The Moonlight" "And The Sea". "And The Sea" features Eric Nichelson of the band Midlake.

Mitchell Cichocki and Emma Kathan have released electronic music under the name Glass Night available through AMDISCS - London.

Mitchell Cichocki has a solo electronic album released under the name Quiet Mansions.

Emma Kathan has a solo electronic album released under the name Night House of Venus.

Guitarist James Scott Rubia has a solo electronic album under the name Animal Clinic and is a guitarist/keyboardist singer in the band Kairos Creature Club (Greenway Records).

== Discography ==
=== The Sexlife of Flowers (2003) ===
1. Sinusoid
2. Disappear
3. Sexlife of Flowers
4. Lighter
5. Deep Water
6. Peru

=== With Us (2006) ===
1. Let Go
2. Laurel Canyon Sunrise
3. There's Always Been A Way
4. Focus 6
5. Early Morning
6. Some Will Come With Flowers
7. Black Jack David
8. Stray

=== Still Life (2008) ===
1. Goodbye Hollywood Forever
2. Near
3. Diamond
4. The Morning After She Left
5. It Will Out
6. All Together
7. Supernature
8. Imperfect People
9. Now
10. Paradise
11. 9 Minutes
12. Natural
13. Decca
14. Lark

=== The Morning Sun (2012) ===
1. Game Over
2. Every Night
3. Start Over
4. Come In
5. The Morning Sun
6. Cruel World or Not
7. Windows
8. Home of Ghosts
9. Far Away
10. Clearer

=== Waves (2016) ===
1. Waves
2. The Light
3. Take You Over
4. Sparks
5. Le Sauvage
6. New Moon
7. Further
8. So Close Between
9. Love Give it Away
10. I'm On Your Side
11. Flowers

=== The Moonlight And The Sea (2018) ===
1. The Moonlight
2. And The Sea

=== Stay Lost Forever (2024) ===
1. Lost Horizon
2. In Your House
3. Not Like Me Anymore, From Everyone
4. Stranger Shores
5. There's Nobody There
6. Stay Lost Forever
7. Don't Ever Leave Here
8. A Million Red Lights
9. Every Night Calls Your Name
10. The Last of the Free Lovers
11. You, Yourself
