= The General Assembly (directors) =

Music video and commercial directors

- Industry: Entertainment
- Founded: 2007
- Defunct: 2014
- Headquarters: Los Angeles, California, US
- Key people: Adam Littke; Adam Willis; Ryan McNeill

The General Assembly (TGA) were an American music video and commercial directing duo based in Los Angeles, CA. They directed music videos for such artists as A.C. Newman, Grum, The Wombats, Totally Enormous Extinct Dinosaurs, Jason Lytle, Fruit Bats (band) and Radar Bros. They also directed commercials for Jameson Irish Whiskey, O2 (UK), George Dickel, BT Group, Jeremiah Weed, Blinkbox, Diageo and BBC Radio 1.

In June 2010, their video for Jason Lytle's "I Am Lost (And The Moment Cannot Last)" was featured in the Los Angeles Film Festival. In June 2011, TGA was included in the Saatchi & Saatchi New Directors Showcase at the Cannes Lions International Festival of Creativity. Also in 2011, they won the Audience Award at the Los Angeles Film Festival for their music video of Grum's "Can't Shake This Feeling."

TGA fully disbanded as of 2014 with Adam Littke and Adam Willis now directing independently.

== Music videos ==
Year	Artist	Song title	Ref(s)
2008	Debate Team	"My Expertise"	
2008	Radar Bros.	"Brother Rabbit"	
2009	Jason Lytle	"I Am Lost (And The Moment Cannot Last)"	
2009	Fruit Bats	"The Ruminant Band"	
2010	Grum	"Can't Shake This Feeling"	
2010	Everest	"Let Go"	
2010	Grum	"Through The Night"	
2010	The Wombats	"Tokyo (Vampires & Wolves)"	
2010	The Wombats	"Techno Fan" (Unreleased)	
2011	Totally Enormous Extinct Dinosaurs	"Trouble"	
2011	Totally Enormous Extinct Dinosaurs	"Tapes & Money" (Unreleased)	
2011	Fruit Bats	"You're Too Weird"	
2012	Everest	"Ownerless"	
2012	A.C. Newman	"I'm Not Talking"	
2014	Eric D. Johnson (As EDJ)	"A West County Girl"	

== Commercials ==
Year	Client	Title	Ref(s)
2011	O2	"DJ Coyle"	
2011	O2	"Peter & Sheila"	
2011	She & Him	"A Very She & Him Christmas"	
2012	Jeremiah Weed	"Alligator"	
2012	Diesel	"The Magic Of Christmas"	
2013	Blinkbox	"Stay Safe, Stay In"	
2013	BBC Radio 1	"Big Weekend"	
2013	Somersby Cider	"Unboxing" (Unreleased)	
2013	George Dickel	"George Dickel Presents" (Unreleased)	
2013	Plusnet	"Juiced"	
2014	Jameson Irish Whiskey	"Jimmy's Story"	
2015	She & Him	"Guide To Standards"	
