= Grum =

Scottish electronic musician

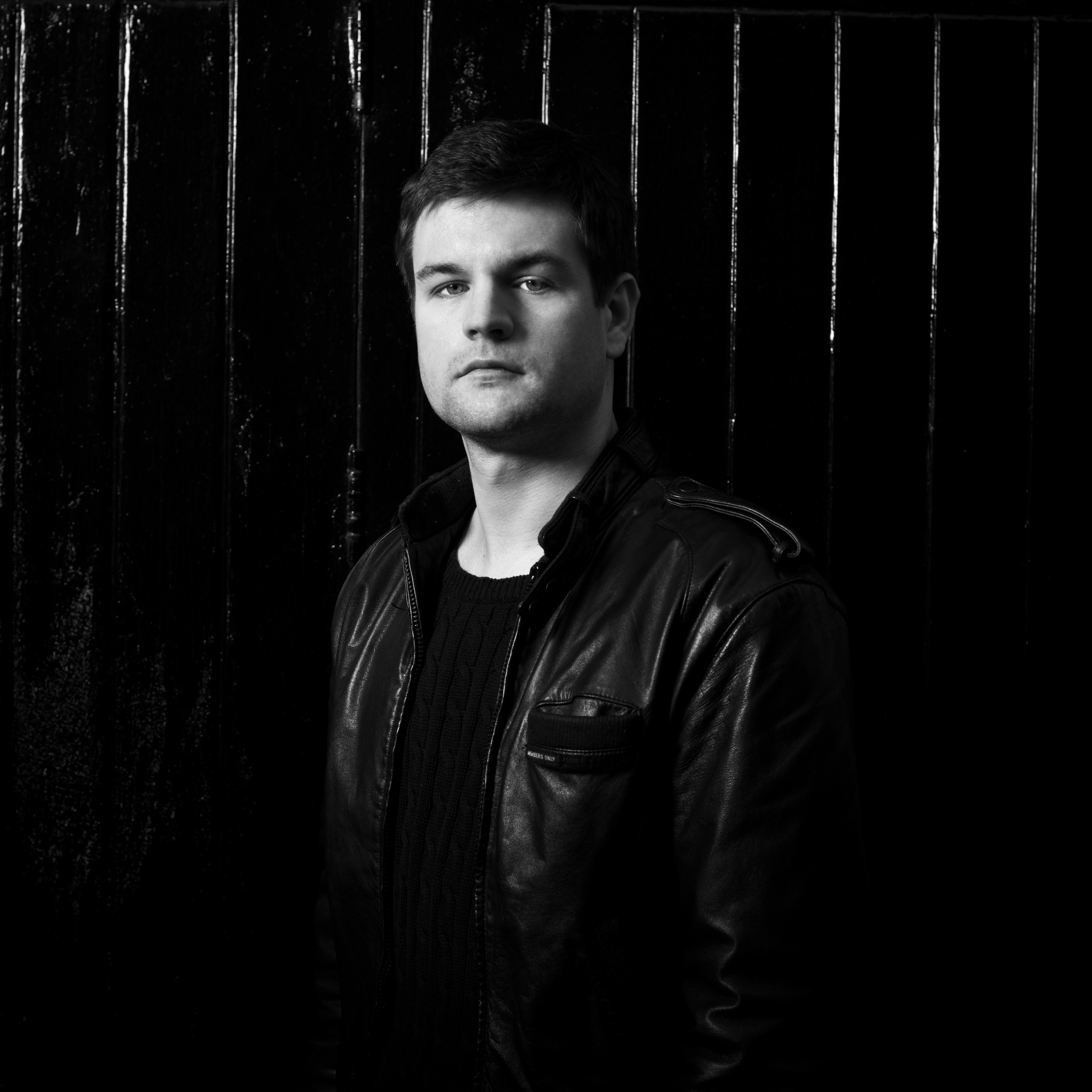
- Grum pictured in Hyde Park, London, February 2013

Background information
- Born: Graeme Shepherd; 2 May 1986 (age 40); Glasgow, Scotland
- Genres: House; progressive house; tech house; trance; nu-disco (early work)
- Occupations: Musician, producer, disc jockey
- Years active: 2007–present
- Labels: Heartbeats, Anjunabeats, Trice Recordings/Armada, Spinnin, Ultra Records, Zerothree, Ministry Of Sound, Deep State
- Website: grum.tv

Graeme Shepherd (born 2 May 1986), better known by his stage name Grum, is a Scottish electronic musician and producer.

== Career ==
Grum's debut album, Heartbeats, was released on 17 May 2010. It has been compared to Daft Punk's Discovery and Mylo's Destroy Rock & Roll. The album went to number 1 in the US iTunes Electronic Dance Charts, and at the end of 2010 he was named "Best Electronic Artist of the Year" by UK iTunes. The song "Turn It Up" was picked as single of the week by iTunes. Grum's single "Heartbeats" was featured in two video games: 2010's The Sims 3: High-End Loft Stuff Pack and Saints Row: The Third in 2011.

Grum's first two music videos from Heartbeats, "Can't Shake This Feeling" and "Through The Night", were shot in Los Angeles and directed by The General Assembly.

By the end of 2012, Grum had played the Creamfields mainstage with Tiesto, the mainstage at Ultra w/ Fatboy Slim and Above & Beyond and Electric Daisy Carnival, as well as playing sets ranging from VICE Magazine gigs in New York to sell out dates in Paris, Barcelona, Australia and Brazil amongst others.

In 2013, Grum released "Everytime", the debut single from his second album Human Touch. It was released on 13 May 2013. He then released "The Theme" which was one of Annie Mac (BBCR1) 'Singles of 2013', and 'Electro Single Of The Month' in Mixmag. His third single "In Love" was released in January 2014 and reached number 35 in the Beatport Top 100 and number 8 in the Beatport Progressive House Chart as well as number 3 in the DMC World Buzz Chart. A fourth single "Tears" which reached number 2 in the DMC World Buzz Charts number 9 in the Cool Cuts Charts and was released on 14 April on Armada Music sub-label Trice Recordings. In May 2014 Grum completed his first 'Essential Mix' for Radio 1 to critical acclaim and toured alongside Fehrplay in the United States.

In 2015, Grum began releasing his music on London-based electronic label Anjunabeats; first, his Trine EP, then the singles "Something About You" and "First Contact".

His singles "Shout" and "Under Your Skin" charted at number one on the Beatport Progressive and Trance charts. To date, Grum has had six tracks in the Beatport top ten and 31 releases in the Beatport top 100.

Grum was set to release Deep State on Anjunabeats in 2018. The album's first single, "Never Have to Be Alone", had already been released in September 2018, but the album release was postponed until its release in November 2019.

In early 2020, Grum announced the launch of his own record label, Deep State Recordings, after his album of the same name.

Human Touch, was originally his sophomore album due to be released in October 2013, but was delayed until April 2014. It was subsequently pushed back again to 2015. Additional singles from the album include "The Touch", "Raindrops", and "Sunday Blue Sky". Human Touch remained unreleased until March 2021, when he announced that he had re-acquired the rights to the album, and it was subsequently released in that same month on Deep State Recordings.

On 24 June 2022, his fourth studio album, Unreality, was released on Anjunabeats. The album features guest vocals by Natalie Shay, Sarah Appel, Dom Youdan, and Daniel Sealine.

== Discography ==
=== Albums ===
==== Studio albums ====
- Heartbeats (2010)
- Deep State (2019)
- Human Touch (2021)
- Unreality (2022)

==== Extended plays ====
- Trine (2015)
- Reconnection (2021)

=== Singles ===
- "Runaway" (2009)
- "Sound Reaction" (2009)
- "Heartbeats" (2009)
- "Can't Shake This Feeling" (2010)
- "Power" (2010)
- "Through The Night" (2010)
- "Everytime" (2013)
- "The Theme" (2013)
- "In Love" (2014)
- "Tears" (2014)
- "Raindrop" (2014)
- "Sunday Blue Sky" (2015)
- "Straight To Your Heart" (2015)
- "First Contact" (2015)
- "Something About You" (2015)
- "Under Your Skin" (featuring Rothchild) (2016)
- "Drifting Away" (2016)
- "SOS" (featuring ilan Bluestone) (2016)
- "You'll Know" (2016)
- "Shout" (2017)
- "Réflection" (2017)
- "Shooting Star" (featuring Kevin McKay) (2017)
- "Shining" (2017)
- "Dark Train" (featuring Kevin McKay) (2017)
- "Price Of Love" (2017)
- "The Love You Feel" (featuring Josep) (2017)
- "Hourglass" (2018)
- "Mirage" (2018)
- "Spirit" (with Fehrplay) (2018)
- "Never Have to Be Alone"
- "Stay" (featuring Natalie Shay) (2019)
- "Tomorrow" (featuring Dom Youdan) (2019)
- "Sparkles" (2021)

=== Remixes ===
- Goldfrapp - "Rocket" (Grum Remix) (2010)
- Pet Shop Boys — "West End Girls" (Grum Remix) (2010)
- Chromeo "Come Alive" (Grum Remix) (2014)
- Above & Beyond — "Is It Love (1001)" (Grum Remix) (2019)
- Cosmic Gate — "Exploration of Space" (Grum Remix) (2019)
- D. Ramirez and Mark Knight — "Colombian Soul" (Grum Remix) (2019)
- Hi-Lo — "LazersX999" (Grum Remix) (2020)
- Amtrac featuring Totally Enormous Extinct Dinosaurs — "Radical" (Grum Remix) (2020)
- BT — "Never Odd or Even" (Grum Remix) (2021)
- Estiva — "Alone" (Grum Remix) (2022)
