= Admiral Radley =

American indie rock band

- Origin: California, United States
- Genres: Indie rock
- Years active: 2009–present
- Label: The Ship

Admiral Radley is an American indie rock band based in California, formed in late 2009 by members from the bands Grandaddy (Jason Lytle and Aaron Burtch) and Earlimart (Aaron Espinoza and Ariana Murray).

== History ==
Originally, the band name was going to be Grandimart or Earlidaddy, a combination of both band's names. However, they decided to name the band after a man they met at a museum in Los Angeles who introduced himself as Admiral Radley. After helping him with a splinter in his thumb they told them about their new band and said they thought of the name "Earlidaddy". The man remarked that that is a terrible name and said they should call themselves Admiral Radley.

Admiral Radley released their debut album, I Heart California, on July 13, 2010 on their label The Ship. It received a generally mixed reception from critics.

A decade later, the EP ADRAD Radio (later renamed ADRAD Vol. 1) was released on Bandcamp on July 3, 2020. A second EP, ADRAD Vol. 2, was released on November 6, 2020, with the mention "STILL OUT THERE..." in the liner notes.

== Discography ==
- I Heart California (2010)
- ADRAD Vol. 1 EP (2020)
- ADRAD Vol. 2 EP (2020
