= Earlimart (band) =

Band in Los Angeles, California, United States

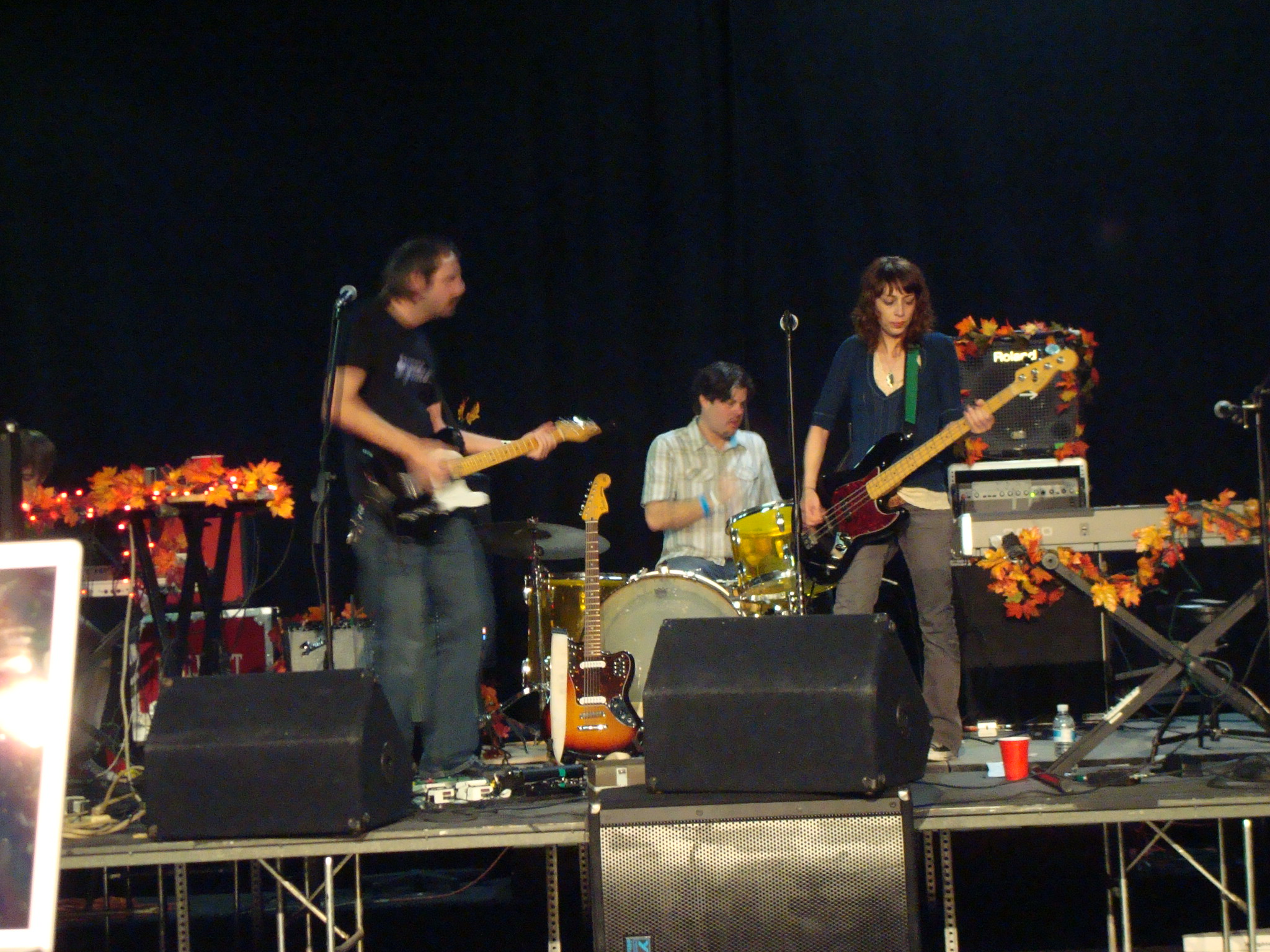
- Performing at South By Southwest 2008

Background information
- Origin: Los Angeles, California, U.S.
- Genre: Indie rock
- Years active: 1999–present
- Labels: Palm Pictures; Majordomo Records

Earlimart is an American indie rock band formed in 1998 in Los Angeles, California, United States, and named after the town of Earlimart, California. The main members are Aaron Espinoza and Ariana Murray. Their early sound has been described as "post-punk", and compared to that of Pavement, Pixies, Sonic Youth and Sparklehorse; later music has been compared to that of Grandaddy and Elliott Smith. In 2009, Espinoza and Murray joined with Jason Lytle and Aaron Burtch of Grandaddy to record an album entitled I Heart California, which was released in 2010 under the name Admiral Radley.

A new Earlimart album was announced during a 2026 tour, the first since System Preferences in 2012. Espinoza stated that the album is essentially done, and while he wasn't sure exactly, he is hoping for a 2027 release.

== Members ==
Current:

- Aaron Espinoza - singer/guitar
- Ariana Murray - bass/keyboard/singer
- Josh Finklea - piano/synth/guitar

Past/Rotating:

- Davey Latter
- Solon Bixler
- Jim Fairchild
- Scott McPherson
- Joel Graves
- Derek Brown
- Russell Pollard
- Brian Aubert
- Andrew Lynch
- Brian Thornell
- John Schlue (visuals)
- David Bowie (short term member)
- Riley Ceyote

== Discography ==
- Filthy Doorways (November 22, 1999)
- Kingdom of Champions (October 17, 2000)
- The Avenues (EP) (January 21, 2003)
- Everyone Down Here (April 22, 2003)
- Treble and Tremble (September 28, 2004)
- Answers and Questions (Single) (July 25, 2006)
- Mentor Tormentor (August 21, 2007)
- Hymn and Her (July 1, 2008)
- System Preferences (September 2012)

== Appearances in other media ==
- "Happy Alone" from the album Mentor Tormentor was used in the films Humboldt County (2008) and TiMER (2009).
- "The World" from the album Mentor Tormentor was played on Life during the discovery of a body in the episode titled "Initiative 38" (season 2, episode 20).
- "Town Where You Belong" from the album Hymn and Her was featured in an episode of ER and an episode of One Tree Hill (2008).
- "The World" from the album Mentor Tormentor was played during the season two premiere of Dollhouse when Claire Saunders left and Boyd found her note.
- "We Drink On The Job" from the album Everyone Down Here was featured in a first-season episode of the American drama show The O.C.
- "It's Okay To Think About Ending" from the album Treble and Tremble was played in the American TV series House.
- "Bloody Nose" from the album Mentor Tormentor was featured in an episode of One Tree Hill (season 5, episode 3).
- "Interloper" from the EP "The Avenues" was featured in an episode in the American TV series The Vampire Diaries.
- "Interloper" from "The Avenues" played in the background during a scene in the American TV series Six Feet Under.
- "Face down in the right town" from the album Hymn and Her was featured in an episode of One Tree Hill (season 6, episode 2).
- "All They Ever Do Is Talk" from the album Treble and Tremble was featured in the episode of Veronica Mars titled Clash of the Tritons.
- "Before It Gets Better" from the album Hymn and Her was featured in the last scene of Ugly Betty's 61st episode, Rabbit Test
- "Broke the Furniture" from the album Treble and Tremble plays during the closing credits of Keiran Mulroney's 2009 film Paper Man.
- "Nevermind the Phonecalls" from the album Mentor Tormentor in the E09 S2 of Shameless.
- "We Drink On The Job" from the album Everyone Down Here was featured in the American film The Art of Getting By.
- "The World" from the album Mentor Tormentor was featured in episode 60, titled "Not Just a Pretty Face," of the USA Network television series Suits.
