= Dos Gringos =

- Genres: Folk rock, hard rock
- Years active: 2001–2013
- Label: Viper Driver Productions

Dos Gringos is a rock band formed by two US Air Force F-16 pilots, Chris "Snooze" Kurek and Rob "Trip" Raymond in 2001. The group has put out four albums about their experiences as fighter pilots and military life. The band is popular in the Air Force, fighter pilot community, and among fans of military aviation worldwide. Many of their songs are highly vulgar and satirical.

== History ==
The band was formed when Chris Kurek and Rob Raymond were stationed at Cannon Air Force Base in New Mexico. They wrote several of their first songs together while deployed to Kuwait during Operation Southern Watch and Operation Iraqi Freedom. They performed some songs at music functions for their squadron, and were encouraged by their squadron commander to record and publish their work. Shortly after they returned from deployment, they recorded and released their first album, Live at the Sand Trap.

The band achieved more viral popularity in the Air Force with their satirical song "I'm a Pilot," which depicts an arrogant, disrespectful pilot talking to his maintenance crew.

== Musical style ==
Dos Gringos have incorporated a variety of different styles into their music, from more folk-style ballads like "2's Blind" to songs with more aggressive, metal-style instrumentation like SOS.

Generally, the songs are sung from the perspective of the band members themselves, lamenting the rising demand for Unmanned aerial vehicle pilots and complaining about the ease of use of JDAM bombs. One of their most popular songs is about Jeremiah Weed, a bourbon liqueur that is a part of Air Force fighter pilot culture.

== Inactivity and further projects ==
Following the release of El Cuatro in 2012, the band has not released any significant material. Their last known performance was in 2013 at Pensacola for a meeting of the Red River Valley Fighter Pilots Association.

Chris Kurek and Rob Raymond later joined with Erik Brine, an Air Force reservist and C-17 pilot, to form a new project called Operation Encore, which seeks to help veterans and active-duty military develop their musical talents and work within the music industry. Chris Kurek indicated in a 2017 interview that he would be interested in producing another Dos Gringos album.

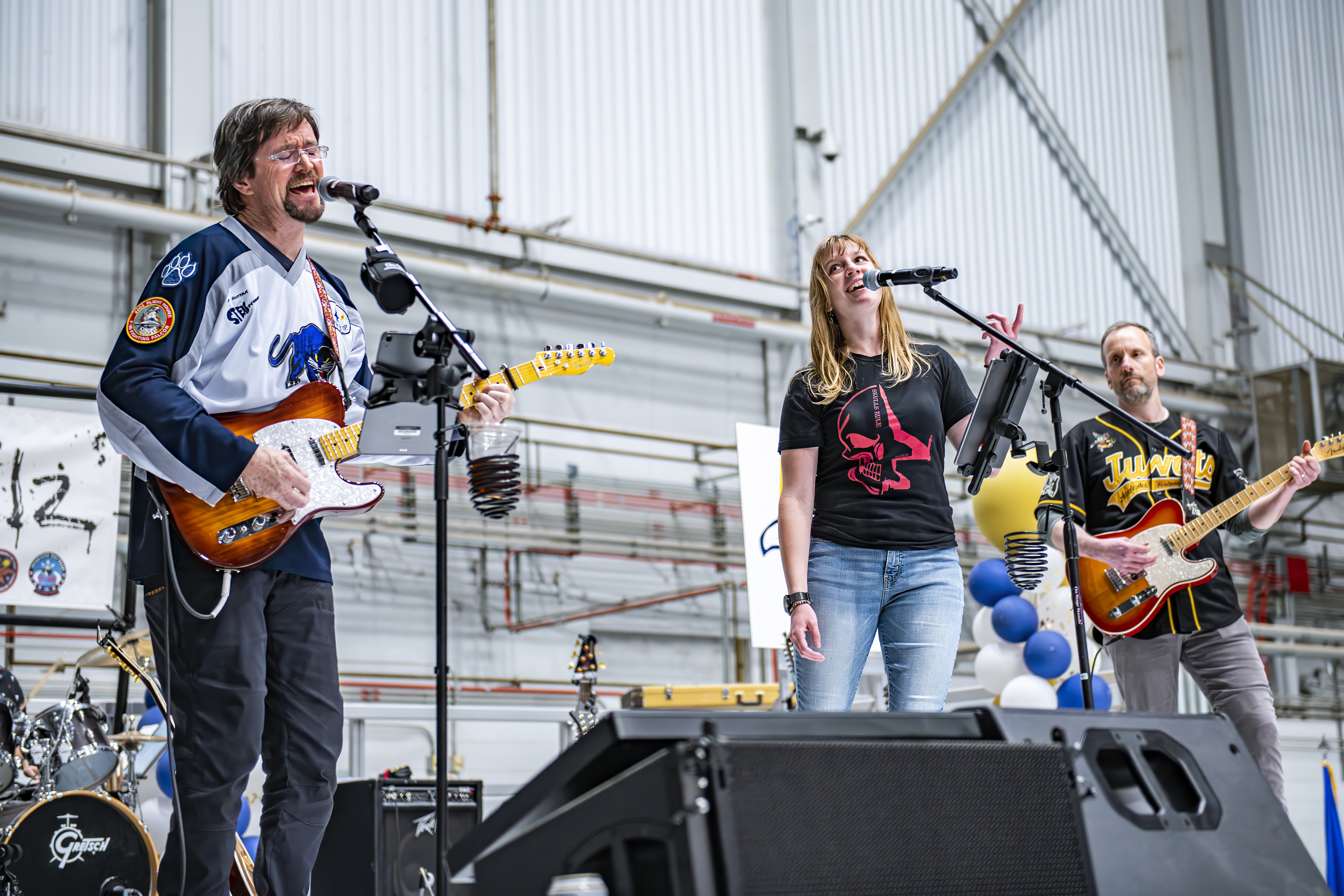
Dos Gringos perform at Edwards Air Force Base, January 2024

On January 25, 2024, Dos Gringos performed for the 50th anniversary celebration of the F-16 Fighting Falcon's first flight at Edwards Air Force Base, California.

== Discography ==
Albums

- Live at the Sand Trap (2003)
- 2 (2006)
- Live At Tommy Rockers (No Really, It Was Live) (2007)
- El Cuatro (2012)
