= Treble & Tremble =

Studio album by Earlimart
- Released: September 28, 2004
- Recorded: The Ship Studios, Eagle Rock, Los Angeles, California
- Genre: Indie rock
- Length: 42:00
- Label: Palm Pictures
- Producer: Aaron Espinoza, Ariana Murray

Earlimart chronology
Everyone Down Here (2003)	Treble & Tremble (2004)	Mentor Tormentor (2007)

Singles from Treble & Tremble
- 1. "Heaven Adores You" Released: September 2004; 2. "The Hidden Track" Released: May 2005

Professional ratings
Review scores
Source	Rating
Allmusic	link
Pitchfork Media	8.0/10 link

Treble & Tremble is the fourth album by Earlimart. The first single was "Heaven Adores You," and a music video was produced to accompany the song.

The album was influenced by Elliott Smith. In an interview with Pitchfork Media, Aaron Espinoza said "...Some people really took [Treble & Tremble] as a concept album or a tribute album to [Smith], and I wouldn't ever say that the album wasn't influenced by him, but it wasn't meant to be a tribute thing. But like I said, I can't ever, ever, ever be ashamed of my association with him. I cherish it every day."

== Track listing ==
All songs written by Earlimart.

1. "Hold On, Slow Down" – 1:40
2. "First Instant Last Report" – 2:27
3. "The Hidden Track" – 4:12
4. "Sounds" – 2:42
5. "The Valley People" – 0:39
6. "All They Ever Do Is Talk" – 3:57
7. "A Bell and a Whistle" – 2:40
8. "Broke the Furniture" – 3:28
9. "Unintentional Tape Manipulations" – 5:56
10. "Heaven Adores You" – 3:43
11. "808 Crickets" – 0:49
12. "Tell the Truth, Parts I & II" – 5:30
13. "It's Okay to Think About Ending" – 5:00
