= Troy von Balthazar =

American singer-songwriter

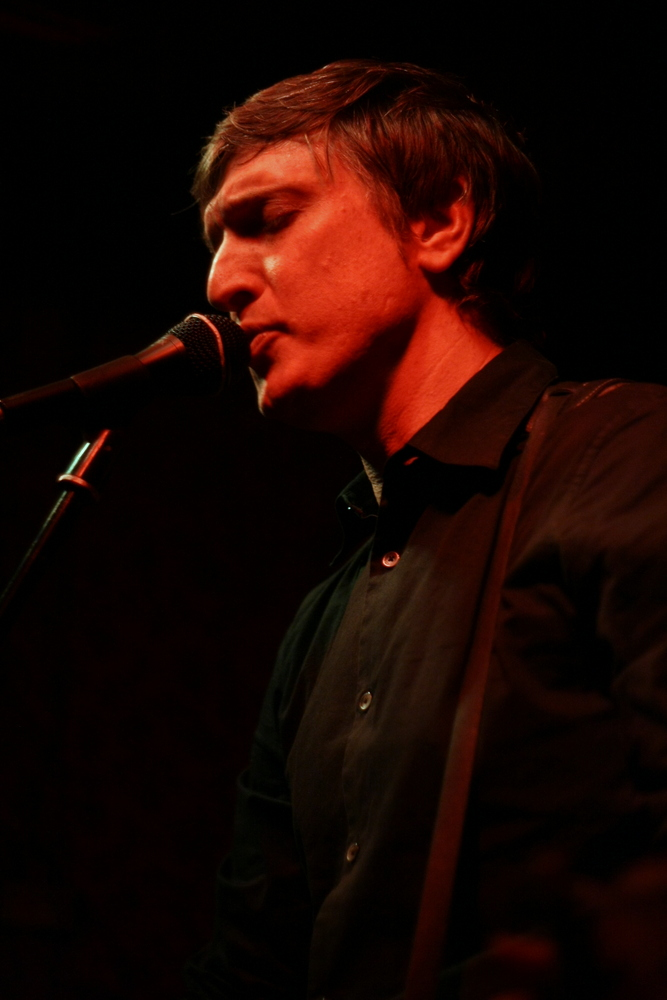
Von Balthazar in 2013

Troy Von Balthazar (TvB) is a Hawaii-born American singer, songwriter and poet who fronted the Los Angeles–based indie rock band Chokebore. His work can be described as intense and original, lo-fi pop music.

== Biography ==
Before working solo Troy Von Balthazar (TvB) became famous in the 1990s as the singer and songwriter of L.A./Hawaii cult band Chokebore. They toured all around the world, including 10 shows supporting Nirvana on their final tour, and released 5 LPs, landmarks in independent rock's history.

Expanding on the slow, sad landscapes of Chokebore's later works, Troy Von Balthazar (TvB) first released a series of homemade CD-R EPs under the moniker "B. Balthazar", performing all instruments (mainly acoustic and electric guitars, drums, vocals and taped samples) himself. His solo debut, the Sweet Receiver EP (2001), was followed in 2002 by the Red Spider EP, . These two EPs were re-released together on the B. Balthazar MCD, which was sold exclusively at shows during Balthazar's first European tour in 2003.

This tour earned him increasing support in the European indie rock community, allowing him to sign to French record label Olympic Disk. Reverting to the moniker he used with Chokebore, he released the self-titled Troy Von Balthazar EP in November 2004 on Olympic Disk. After a French tour supporting this release, he flew back to Los Angeles to record his debut album at Elliott Smith's "New Monkey" studio. Troy Von Balthazar performed, recorded and mixed all the tracks himself, with the exception of some female vocals contributed by French musician Adeline Fargier. The Troy Von Balthazar LP was released by Olympic Disk on October 10, 2005. An extensive European tour followed, spanning most of the year 2006.

In early 2007, Balthazar returned to Los Angeles to record his second album, this time backed by the band The Black Pine. During the fall of 2007 he toured Germany, Austria and Switzerland with the German rock band Tocotronic, supporting the German release of his self-titled album Troy Von Balthazar by Sinnbus on October 26, 2007. The same year, he published his first book titled "3 Girls", which was distributed via Sinnbus.

In 2009, Troy put together the TVB 3 EP, a collection of three EPs comprising previously released EPs Sweet Receiver and Red Spider, along with several new or previously unreleased songs. In October 2009, the TVB 3 EP was released in vinyl format as The TVB LP by Czech label Silver Rocket Records.

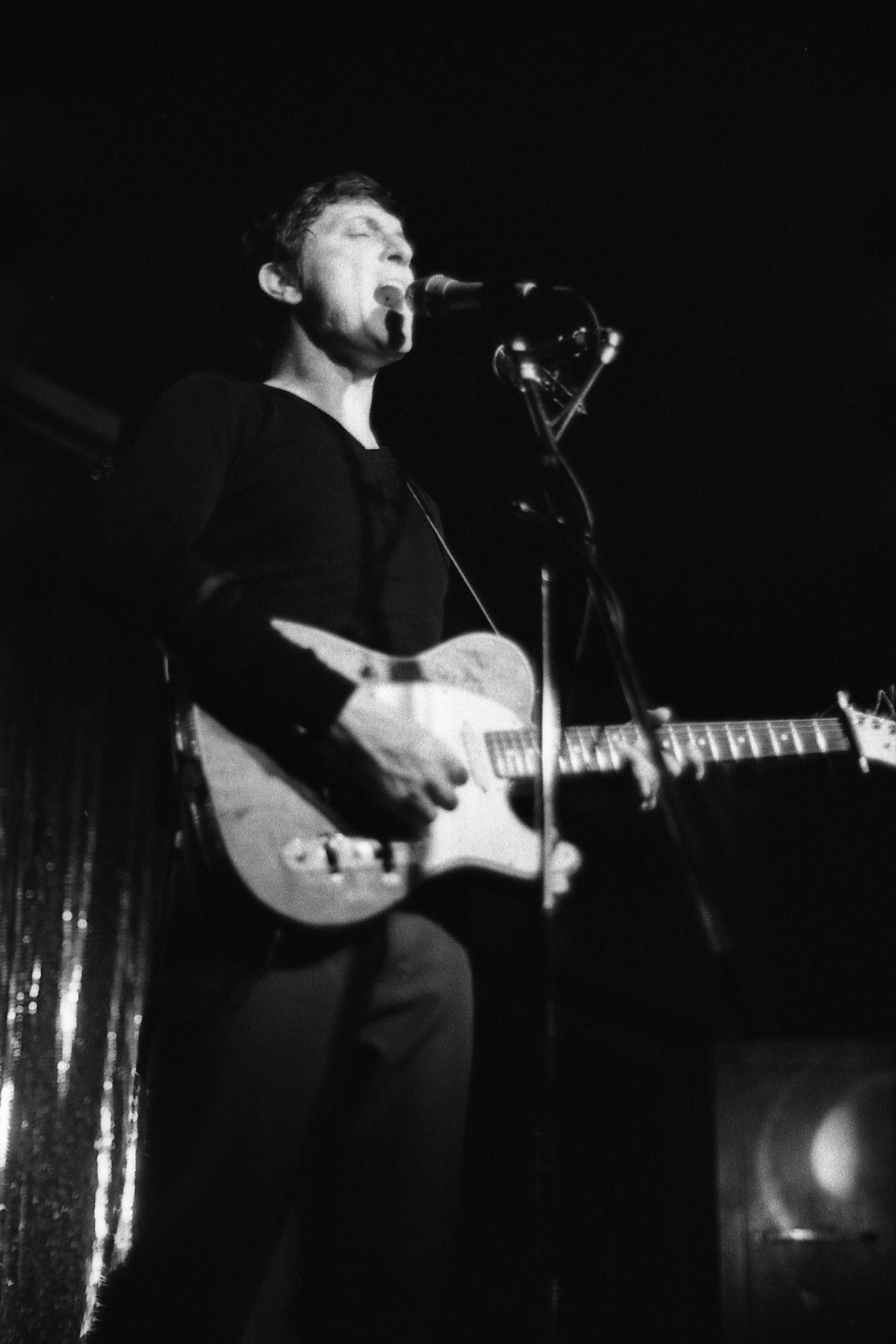
Onstage in Berlin, 2009

In 2010, he and his former bandmates reactivated Chokebore to play European shows during the month of February, then some festivals during the summer.

On August 27, 2010, French label Third Side Records released the Troy Von Balthazar single Dots and Hearts as a digital download, that was soon followed by the release on September 13 of Troy Von Balthazar's second full-length album How to Live on Nothing.

In October 2012 the French label "Vicious Circle Records" released his third studio album "...is with the demon" to wide critical acclaim.

That year TvB also recorded music for the movie "This Aint California" a film about German skateboarders behind the Berlin wall in the 1980s, the French film "Des Morceaux de Moi" (release date February 13, 2013), and the French film "Cover us" in which a ghost sings the Troy Von Balthazar song "Wings" to a boy who discovers him.

In 2013 he released his 2nd book "This poem does not please her".

In 2015 Troy Von Balthazar (TvB) teamed up with Jason Lytle (Grandaddy), Kenneth Stringfellow (The Posies, R.E.M., Mercury Rev) and 11 chamber orchestra musicians to perform a tribute to Elliott Smith. "The Color Bar Experience" plays Elliott Smiths full Figure 8 album with the orchestra and their voices. Concerts were played across France to rave review and a full live album was made of their performance on Radio 1 in Paris.

In 2016 TvB released his new album "Knights of Something" worldwide to critical acclaim, with record companies: Vicious Circle Records in France, Siluh Records in Austria, New High Recordings in the US, and Donuts Pop in Japan. His fourth studio album, recorded in Berlin and the South of France using a combination of an old Tascam 388, tape machine and Pro Tools, a bunch of amazing guitar pedals, and vintage microphones. "TvB has captured lo-fi songwriting and recording at its best, stream of consciousness music structures and intense sweeping lyricism that boggles the mind and attaches to the heart and soul of the listener. TvB is an artist who has actually produces his own powerful sound, lets call it “The TvB sound”."

Troy is currently preparing for tour supporting "Knights of Something", writing his fifth album, and his third book.

== Live performances ==
Troy's one man band live performances incorporate looping techniques and several distortion techniques. Many people have commented that his live performances, when performed in this fashion, are equal in strength to his studio recordings and his lo-fi analog and intimate recording style.

Troy has also performed with supporting musicians Adeline Fargier, Jérôme Laperruque, and Christian Madrigal.

In May 2015 Troy teamed up with Grandaddy's Jason Lytle on French radio station France Musique under the name "Jason Lytle, Troy Von Balthazar & The Color Bars Experience" to cover and perform Elliott Smith's Figure 8 with a chamber orchestra.

== Discography ==
=== Albums ===
- Aloha Means Goodbye, (Vicious Circle Records, 2025)
- Courage, Mon Amour! (Vicious Circle Records, 2021)
- It Ends Like Crazy (Vicious Circle Records, 2019)
- Knights of Something (Vicious Circle Records, 2016)
- " ...Is With the Demon" (Vicious Circle Records, 2012)
- How to Live on Nothing (Third Side Records, 2010)
- Troy Von Balthazar (Olympic Disk, 2005; Sinnbus, 2007)

=== Singles and EPs ===
- Tigers Vs Pigeon, (The New Black, 2012)
- Dots and Hearts single – digital download (Third Side Records, 2010)
- TVB 3 EP (self-released, 2009; released on vinyl as The TVB LP by Silver Rocket Records, 2009)
- Troy Von Balthazar EP (Olympic Disk, 2004)
- B. Balthazar MCD (self-released, 2003)
- Red Spider EP – digital download (self-released, 2002)
- Sweet Receiver EP (self-released, 2001)

=== DVD ===
- Live in Paris — limited edition of 150 (self-released, 2006)
