= Hymn and Her =

Studio album by Earlimart
- Released: July 1, 2008
- Recorded: The Ship Studios, Eagle Rock, Los Angeles, California
- Genre: Indie rock
- Length: 42:23
- Label: Major Domo Records; Shout! Factory
- Producer: Aaron Espinoza, Ariana Murray, Andrew Lynch (singer-songwriter)

Earlimart chronology
Mentor Tormentor (2007)	Hymn and Her (2008)

Professional ratings
Review scores
Source	Rating
Allmusic	4/5 stars
Pitchfork Media	(6.7/10)
The Skinny	3/5 stars

Hymn and Her is the sixth album by American indie rock band Earlimart. It was announced in March by Aaron Espinoza, and was released in the US on July 1, 2008 via Major Domo Records and Shout! Factory, and a day later in Japan, via Youth Records.

Allmusic awarded the album with 4 out of 5 stars, and stated that Hymn and Her "...sounds intimate, as if the bandmates have discovered how to funnel their densely populated songs into warm, mellow washes of sound."

== Track listing ==
All songs written by Espinoza and Murray.

1. "Song For" - 2:32
2. "Face Down in the Right Town" - 4:49
3. "Before It Gets Better" - 4:25
4. "For the Birds" - 3:19
5. "God Loves You the Best" - 4:04
6. "Great Heron Gates" - 3:47
7. "Cigarettes and Kerosene" - 2:59
8. "Teeth" - 4:31
9. "Time for Yourself" - 3:56
10. "Hymn and Her" - 3:27
11. "Town Where You Belong" - 2:52
12. "Tell Me" - 1:47
13. "Sewing Up the Seams" (Japan only bonus track)
14. "Underground Gardens" (Japan only bonus track)
