= Nav/attack =

American electronic music band

nav/attack
- Origin: Los Angeles, California
- Genres: Electronic, pop, ambient
- Years active: 2013–present
- Label: Dangerbird Records
- Members: Andrew Lynch
- Website: navattack.com

nav/attack is an electronic music project from Los Angeles founded by Alaskan-born Andrew Lynch (singer-songwriter). Its eponymous debut album was released on October 2, 2015 on Dangerbird Records with music videos starring Adam Goldberg.

Lynch has stated that the music of nav/attack is heavily influenced by European Arthouse cinema.

Song Releases

1. A Different Here [Andrew Lynch] 4:21:00
2. More Wins [Andrew Lynch] 3:53:00
3. Tear It [Andrew Lynch] 3:30
4. Default [Andrew Lynch] 5:02
5. Like Someone In His Place[Andrew Lynch] 3:48
6. Gimme Back [Andrew Lynch] 4:36
7. NewsBreak [Andrew Lynch] 3:18
8. Factory Life [Andrew Lynch] 3:54
9. Clear As Clouds [Andrew Lynch] 3:54
10. Somewhere [Andrew Lynch] 5:19
