= Jeremiah Weed =

Brand of bourbon whiskey-based products

- Type: Bourbon Liqueur
- Manufacturer: Heublein
- Origin: Stamford, Connecticut, United States
- Alcohol by volume: 45.0% and 50.0%
- Proof (US): 90 and 100
- Related products: Seagram and Diageo
- Website: www.jeremiahweed.com

Jeremiah Weed was a brand of bourbon whiskey-based products. The Jeremiah Weed brand is owned and marketed by Diageo. It was discontinued in 2016.

== Range ==
Their offerings include a 90 proof blended whiskey distilled in Kentucky, and a bourbon-based 100-proof liqueur manufactured in Connecticut. In 2011, Jeremiah Weed entered the flavored malt beverages market with five blends, three marketed in the U.S. and two in the UK. The U.S.-market blends are 5.8% ABV, and the UK-market blends are 4.0% ABV.

In 2009, Jeremiah Weed introduced a blend of flavored vodka, Southern Style Sweet Tea, followed in 2010 by a lemonade blend called Half and Half. 2011 saw the introduction of three flavored malt beverages (a category sometimes referred to as alcopop) — Lightning Lemonade, Roadhouse Tea, and Spiked Cola.

Also in 2011, Jeremiah Weed launched two Brews into the UK: Jeremiah Weed Sour Mash Brew which has a bourbon taste and Jeremiah Weed Root Brew which has a ginger taste.

== Promotion ==
Gary Jules produced a song titled "Jeremiah Weed" in 1998. The brand was also promoted by the folk rock band Dos Gringos in their 2003 song, "Jeremiah Weed" in which the product's stance as a favorite of United States Air Force fighter pilots is heavily referenced, as both of the singers are veteran F-16 Fighting Falcon pilots. Ohio folk singer Eric Nassau also performed a song with the same title in 2008.

Jeremiah Weed was promoted extensively by The Adam Carolla Podcast. American Southern rock band ZZ Top is also a current promoter of the brand, as shown in a video on Jeremiah Weed's YouTube page.

In 2012, Jeremiah Weed released its first TV commercial, "Alligator" exclusively in the United Kingdom. It was directed by The General Assembly (directors) in Los Angeles. The spot features a real 7-foot alligator.

In 2013, Diageo changed the advertising of Jeremiah Weed in the UK, including the Alligator advert to describe the product as a cider.
