= Mirage Rock =

Studio album by Band of Horses
- Released: September 18, 2012
- Recorded: Sunset Sound Studios, California
- Genre: Alternative rock
- Length: 45:17
- Label: Columbia
- Producer: Glyn Johns

Band of Horses chronology
Infinite Arms (2010)	Mirage Rock (2012)	Why Are You OK (2016)

Singles from Mirage Rock
- 1. "Knock Knock" Released: July 10, 2012; 2. "Slow Cruel Hands of Time" Released: September 5, 2012; 3. "Feud" Released: November 26, 2012

Mirage Rock is the fourth studio album by Band of Horses and was released on September 18, 2012, on Columbia Records. Produced by Glyn Johns, the album was preceded by the single, "Knock Knock".

While the album was initially met with generally favorable reviews, the band and fans alike have since become quite critical of it, with Bridwell admitting Mirage Rock to be stilted and insincere. Songs from the album have been rarely performed since the album's promotional tour.

== Pre-release ==
In April 2012, lead singer, Ben Bridwell, revealed that Band of Horses' fourth studio album was scheduled for release in late 2012, with production by Glyn Johns. In June 2012, via Facebook and YouTube, the band shared a video preview of a new song, "Dumpster World," and confirmed a September 2012 release for the album.

On July 10, 2012, the fourth album's title was confirmed as Mirage Rock, and the track listing and artwork were also unveiled. Bridwell has stated that there is no such place as Mirage Rock and explained that the name "is a total piss take." Prior to the official launch of Mirage Rock on September 18, "Knock Knock" and "Slow Cruel Hands of Time" were released as previews of the album. On September 10, 2012, the entire album was streamed on both the Band of Horses SoundCloud page and the official website.

Just prior to the album's release, the track "Mirage Rock" was made available on the internet. Although this is billed as the "title track" it does not appear on the regular version of the album, but is one of five tracks on the deluxe edition of Mirage Rock. These five tracks were recorded at the Sonic Ranch studios in Texas.

== Recording ==
Bridwell explained that Johns recorded Mirage Rock with both "analogue and live" technology, with the album having "a looser vibe than our previous records." He described the album as "haphazard...loose and raw at times...letting our hair down," with "more humour" and a "celebratory vibe."

== Reception ==
Professional ratings
Aggregate scores
Source	Rating
Metacritic	68/100
Review scores
Source	Rating
AllMusic	3.5/5 stars
The A.V. Club	B−
Exclaim!	3/10
The Guardian	4/5 stars
NME	8/10
Paste	8.6/10
Pitchfork	4.0/10
Q	3/5 stars
Spin	4/10
Rolling Stone	3.5/5 stars

Mirage Rock has received generally favourable reviews. It currently has an aggregate score of 68 out of 100 from 29 professional reviews on the Metacritic website.

The album was ranked number 50 on American Songwriter's and number 19 on Rolling Stone's lists of the top 50 albums of 2012. Rolling Stone said, "They conjure the embroidered-blue-jean countryrock of The Eagles (whose first LPs were helmed by Johns) and spike it with punk noise and a 21st-century bloodshot optimism."

The album debuted at number 13 on the Billboard 200, number 4 on the Alternative Albums chart and number 7 on the Rock Albums chart, selling around 24,000 copies in the first week. It has sold 75,000 copies in the United States as of May 2016.

The single "Knock Knock" was a minor hit in Belgium, reaching number 73 in the singles chart. The follow-up single "Slow Cruel Hands of Time" peaked at number 68.

== Track listing ==
No.	Title	Writer(s)	Length
1.	"Knock Knock"	Bridwell and Bill Reynolds	3:58
2.	"How to Live"	Bridwell and Reynolds	3:27
3.	"Slow Cruel Hands of Time"	Bridwell	3:50
4.	"A Little Biblical"	Bridwell and Reynolds	2:54
5.	"Shut-In Tourist"	Bridwell and Tyler Ramsey	4:09
6.	"Dumpster World"	Bridwell	3:43
7.	"Electric Music"	Bridwell and Reynolds	3:32
8.	"Everything's Gonna Be Undone"	Ramsey	3:19
9.	"Feud"	Bridwell	2:56
10.	"Long Vows"	Bridwell	3:43
11.	"Heartbreak on the 101"	Bridwell, Reynolds and Ramsey	4:01

Bonus tracks
No.	Title	Writer(s)	Length
12.	"Ego Nightmare" (iTunes bonus track)	Bridwell	3:26

== Sonic Ranch Sessions ==
The deluxe version of the album includes an EP, titled Sonic Ranch Sessions. It was recorded in El Paso, Texas at Sonic Ranch Studio and produced by the band.

No.	Title	Writer(s)	Length
1.	"Mirage Rock"	Bridwell
2.	"Irmo Bats"	Bridwell
3.	"Relly's Dream"	Bridwell and Ryan Monroe
4.	"Catalina"	Bridwell and Ramsey
5.	"Bock"	Bridwell

== Album credits ==
Band of Horses

- Benjamin Bridwell
- Creighton Barrett
- Ryan Monroe
- Bill Reynolds
- Tyler Ramsey

Additional musicians

- Eric Gorfain - string arrangements and violin (11)
- Daphne Chen - violin (11)
- Lauren Chipman - viola (11)
- Richard Dodd - cello (11)

Recording personnel

- Glyn Johns - producer, engineer, mixing
- Morgan Stratton - assistant engineer
- Bob Ludwig - mastering

Artwork

- Christopher Wilson - photography
- Dave Bett - design

Sonic Ranch Sessions

- Band of Horses - producer
- Jason Kingsland - engineer, mixing
- Manuel Calderon - assistant engineer
- Bill Reynolds - mixing
- Adam Ayan - mastering

== Charts ==
Chart	Peak
Australian Albums Chart	21
Austrian Albums Chart	61
Belgian Flanders Albums Chart	27
Belgian Wallonia Albums Chart	115
Danish Albums Chart	9
Dutch Albums Chart	55
German Albums Chart	72
Irish Albums Chart	20
New Zealand Albums Chart	21
Norwegian Albums Chart	9
Spanish Albums Chart	24
Swedish Albums Chart	15
Swiss Albums Chart	35
UK Albums Chart	20
US Billboard 200	13
US Top Alternative Albums (Billboard)	4
US Top Rock Albums (Billboard)	7
US Indie Store Album Sales (Billboard)	5
US Vinyl Albums (Billboard)	8
