= Mentor Tormentor =

Studio album by Earlimart
- Released: August 21, 2007
- Recorded: The Ship Studios, Eagle Rock, Los Angeles, California
- Genre: Indie rock
- Length: 52:54
- Label: Major Domo Records; Shout! Factory
- Producer: Aaron Espinoza, Ariana Murray

Earlimart chronology
Treble and Tremble (2004)	Mentor Tormentor (2007)	Hymn and Her (2008)

Professional ratings
Review scores
Source	Rating
Allmusic	(not rated) link
Pitchfork Media	(7.2/10) link

Mentor Tormentor is the fifth studio album from Los Angeles indie rock band Earlimart. The album was released on August 21, 2007 in the US. On July 25, 2006, a limited edition 7" vinyl single was released by Suicide Squeeze Records featuring the song "Answers and Questions." The single version of "Answers and Questions" is shorter in length and ends abruptly, whereas the album version ends on a crescendo.

== Track listing ==
All songs written by Aaron Espinoza and Ariana Murray.

1. "Fakey Fake" – 3:58
2. "Answers and Questions" – 4:33
3. "Nevermind the Phonecalls" – 3:34
4. "Happy Alone" – 4:42
5. "The Little Things" – 2:12
6. "700>100" – 3:18
7. "Everybody Knows Everybody" – 2:37
8. "Don't Think About Me" – 4:18
9. "Gonna Break Into Your Heart" – 3:32
10. "Bloody Nose" – 4:46
11. "The World" – 2:11
12. "Just Because" – 5:18
13. "Reprise" – 0:46
14. "Nothing Is True" – 3:18
15. "Cold Cold Heaven" – 3:51

== Bonus disc ==
Released in limited quantities at select indie music stores only

1. "Waiting for The Man" – 2:39
2. "The Little Things" (Live from the Green Screen Sessions) – 2:22

== Singles ==
- Answers and Questions (July 25, 2006)
  - b/w: "Caruthers Boy"
