= Just Like the Fambly Cat =

Studio album by Grandaddy
- Released: May 9, 2006
- Recorded: Modesto, California, United States
- Genres: Indie rock; indie pop; space pop
- Length: 61:14
- Label: V2
- Producer: Jason Lytle

Grandaddy chronology
| Excerpts from the Diary of Todd Zilla (EP) (2005) | Just Like the Fambly Cat (2006) | Last Place (2017) |

Singles from Just Like the Fambly Cat
- 1. "Elevate Myself" Released: June 26, 2006

Just Like the Fambly Cat is the fourth studio album by American indie rock band Grandaddy. It was released on May 9, 2006 by record label V2.

The album reached No. 171 on the Billboard 200, No. 10 on the Top Independent Albums chart and No. 50 on the UK Albums Chart. It was well received by music critics.

== Content ==
The album's title is a reference to frontman Jason Lytle's desire to leave his home town of Modesto, California without any fuss, stating that cats will "do that, almost out of respect and not wanting to put people out ... because when the family cat dies, he doesn't make a big deal about it ... He just disappears".

== Recording ==
Lytle spent eighteen months recording the album at a studio in Modesto, California. Regarding the recording process, Lytle noted "During the one-and-a-half years that I recorded this album I lost my girl, my friends, my home, estranged my family, got sober, got wasted ... I got too many things going on. The band breaking up only became a reality at the end of the recording. Many songs that people claim to be directly related to the band are actually directly related to other things I had going on."

The album does not feature any of the other band members, apart from Aaron Burtch who performed "most of" the album's drums. Lytle chose to credit the album to the band, stating "It's much more natural to imagine a band rocking out together than it is to imagine one frustrated guy at 4:30am in his boxer shorts and messed up hair, slaving over the same keyboard part for four-and-a-half hours. I recorded and wrote all of the music and the parts [but] I didn't want to distract the listener from whatever they needed to think when they heard the music."

== Release ==
Just Like the Fambly Cat was released on May 9, 2006, by record label V2. The album reached No. 171 on the Billboard 200 and No. 10 on the Top Independent Albums chart, as well as No. 50 on the UK Albums Chart. "Elevate Myself" was released as the first and only single from the album, and was their first single since 1998 to not chart on the UK Singles Chart.

== Reception ==
Professional ratings
Aggregate scores
| Source | Rating |
|---|---|
| Metacritic | 74/100 |
Review scores
| Source | Rating |
| AllMusic | 4/5 stars |
| Entertainment Weekly | B+ |
| The Guardian | 4/5 stars |
| The Independent | 5/5 stars |
| Mojo | 3/5 stars |
| NME | 7/10 |
| Pitchfork | 6.8/10 |
| Spin | 3/5 stars |
| Uncut | 4/5 stars |
| The Village Voice | A− |

Critical response to the album was positive. AllMusic reviewer Tim Sendra called the album "a fine epitaph". Mojo gave it three stars, as did Spin, who called it "equal parts bang and whimper". Billboard commented on the albums "more personal" lyrics and called the album "a worthy coda to a woefully under-appreciated band". The Boston Globe described it as "a gorgeous album that should be admired much like a fleeting sunny afternoon or a sad foreign movie viewed without subtitles". The Stranger gave it a three-star review, noting an "air of melancholic finality" and calling the songwriting "the best it's been since The Sophtware Slump". The Guardian called it "a sad record ... but an inspiring one too".

== Track listing ==
All tracks are written by Jason Lytle, except "Shangri-La (Outro)" by Jeff Lynne.

| No. | Title | Length |
|---|---|---|
| 1. | "What Happened..." | 2:19 |
| 2. | "Jeez Louise" | 3:41 |
| 3. | "Summer... It's Gone" | 5:30 |
| 4. | "Oxygen/Aux Send" | 1:08 |
| 5. | "Rear View Mirror" | 6:08 |
| 6. | "The Animal World" | 4:53 |
| 7. | "Skateboarding Saves Me Twice" | 3:22 |
| 8. | "Where I'm Anymore" | 6:07 |
| 9. | "50%" | 1:02 |
| 10. | "Guide Down Denied" | 6:32 |
| 11. | "Elevate Myself" | 3:41 |
| 12. | "Campershell Dreams" | 3:44 |
| 13. | "Disconnecty" | 3:34 |
| 14. | "This Is How It Always Starts" | 6:46 |
| 15. | "Shangri-La (Outro)" (hidden track) | 2:16 |

== Personnel ==
Grandaddy

- Jason Lytle – vocals, all instruments, production, artwork
- Aaron Burtch – drums

Additional personnel

- Kevin Garcia – backing vocals
- Rusty Miller – backing vocals
- Lauren Goldfarb – dialogue (track 1)
- Lucea Legnini – dialogue (track 1)

Technical

- Lucky Lew – engineering
- Dave Trumfio – mixing
- Greg Calbi – mastering
- Jen Murse – digital finesse
- Adrian Mendoza – "photo help"
