= Why Are You OK =

Studio album by Band of Horses
- Released: June 10, 2016
- Genres: Indie rock, Southern rock
- Length: 49:00
- Label: Interscope
- Producer: Jason Lytle

Band of Horses chronology
Mirage Rock (2012)	Why Are You OK (2016)	Things Are Great (2022)

Singles from Why Are You OK
- 1. "Casual Party" Released: April 24, 2016; 2. "In A Drawer" Released: May 11, 2016; 3. "Solemn Oath" Released: May 26, 2016

Why Are You OK is the fifth studio album by indie rock band Band of Horses, released on June 10, 2016, on Interscope Records. Produced by Jason Lytle, of the band Grandaddy, the album was preceded by the singles "Casual Party", "In A Drawer" and "Solemn Oath". It is the band's last album with guitarist Tyler Ramsey and bassist Bill Reynolds, who both left the group in 2017.

== Critical reception ==
Professional ratings
Aggregate scores
Source	Rating
AnyDecentMusic?	6.9/10
Metacritic	68/100
Review scores
Source	Rating
Consequence of Sound	B−
The Guardian	4/5 stars
Pitchfork	6.0/10

The album received a score of 68 out of 100 on review aggregator website Metacritic, indicating "generally favorable" reviews from critics. Aggregator AnyDecentMusic? gave the album a score of 6.9 out of 10 based on their assessment of the critical consensus. Dave Simpson of The Guardian observed a "return to the wide-eyed, dreamy vulnerability that marked the Seattle band's first two records", noting that Why Are You OK centers on "anthemic indie-rock that pinpoints the place where wistfulness and euphoria collide, then showers it in effervescent harmonies and melodies." Simpson compared "Casual Party" to New Order, and "Hag" to OMD's "Souvenir" (1981).

=== Accolades ===
Accolades for Why Are You OK
Publication	Accolade	Year	Rank
Rough Trade	Albums of the Year	2016	39

== Track listing ==
No.	Title	Writer(s)	Length
1.	"Dull Times/The Moon"	Benjamin Bridwell	7:00
2.	"Solemn Oath"	Bridwell	4:00
3.	"Hag"	Bridwell	4:32
4.	"Casual Party"	Bridwell	3:53
5.	"In a Drawer" (featuring J. Mascis)	Bridwell, Jason Lytle	3:58
6.	"Hold on Gimme a Sec"	Lytle	1:12
7.	"Lying Under Oak"	Bill Reynolds, Bridwell	3:57
8.	"Throw My Mess"	Bridwell	3:13
9.	"Whatever, Wherever"	Bridwell	4:13
10.	"Country Teen"	Tyler Ramsey	3:21
11.	"Barrel House"	Bridwell	4:48
12.	"Even Still"	Reynolds, Bridwell	5:23

== Charts ==
Chart (2016)	Peak position
Australian Albums (ARIA)	22
Belgian Albums (Ultratop Flanders)	25
Belgian Albums (Ultratop Wallonia)	83
Canadian Albums (Billboard)	58
Dutch Albums (Album Top 100)	53
German Albums (Offizielle Top 100)	72
Irish Albums (IRMA)	23
New Zealand Albums (RMNZ)	2
Norwegian Albums (VG-lista)	20
Spanish Albums (Promusicae)	31
Swedish Albums (Sverigetopplistan)	33
Swiss Albums (Schweizer Hitparade)	40
UK Albums (Official Charts)	37
US Billboard 200	19
