= Dept. of Disappearance =

Studio album by Jason Lytle
- Released: October 16, 2012
- Studios: The Warbler, Montana, United States
- Genres: Indie pop; indie rock
- Label: ANTI-
- Producer: Jason Lytle

Jason Lytle chronology
Yours Truly, the Commuter (2009)	Dept. of Disappearance (2012)	House Show (2014)

Dept. of Disappearance is the second solo studio album by American indie rock musician Jason Lytle. It was released on October 16, 2012, by record label ANTI-. Regarding the album, Lytle noted, "If there were any deliberate attempts on this record, it was trying to get back to more of a fairy-tale-ish-fantasy thing that was once again rooted in reality, with drums, pianos and real instruments."

== Writing and composition ==
Regarding the album's lyrical and thematic content, Jason Lytle noted, "I think if anything, some of the elements that used to drive a lot of my favourite Grandaddy songs home, was this whole storytelling aspect. Creating these little worlds and creating sounds and creating lines [where] you almost have to create your own little image to go with what you're hearing. [...] I had this recurring image throughout the album, and I don't know where this came from. It's this recurring image, of some sort of tragedy. It's a woman, stranded, up high, in a blizzard, among the rocks and a guy who is down in the valley who can't do anything about it and its this distress of him knowing he can't do anything about it. I think there are two or three songs, where that imagery pops up."

== Reception ==
Professional ratings
Aggregate scores
Source	Rating
Metacritic	71/100
Review scores
Source	Rating
AllMusic	4/5 stars
Consequence of Sound	C+
Pitchfork	5.9/10

AllMusic's Tim Sendra gave the album a positive review, stating "Dept. of Disappearance shows that far from vanishing, Lytle is making a claim to be one of the more interesting and consistent singer-songwriters around; willing to take sonic chances, but always delivering music that's as much about feel as it is about meaning."

Stephen Deusner of Pitchfork gave the album a mixed review, noting "[The track 'Your Final Setting Sun'] says more about Lytle's career than any veiled lyric could: If he can't push himself in new directions, he'll be stuck at his desk job, pushing paper for the Department of Disappearance forever."

== Track listing ==
All tracks are written by Jason Lytle.

No.	Title	Length
1.	"Dept. of Disappearance"	4:33
2.	"Matterhorn"	5:15
3.	"Young Saints"	4:07
4.	"Hangtown"	3:51
5.	"Get Up and Go"	2:15
6.	"Last Problem of the Alps"	5:44
7.	"Willow Wand Willow Wand"	3:47
8.	"Somewhere There's a Someone"	6:15
9.	"Chopin Drives Truck to the Dump"	0:34
10.	"Your Final Setting Sun"	5:09
11.	"Gimme Click Gimme Grid"	8:13

iTunes bonus tracks
No.	Title	Length
12.	"Flyberbonk"	2:49
13.	"Elko in the Rain"	4:01
14.	"Hangtown (Alternate Version)"	4:20
15.	"Your Final Setting Sun (Australian Acoustic)"	7:26

== Personnel ==
- Jason Lytle - vocals, guitar, keyboards, piano, drums, percussion, dulcimer, melodica, effects, production, recording, engineering, mixing, album art, photography

Additional personnel

- Brett Allen - recording assistance
- Larry Crane - mixing
- Greg Calbi - mastering
- Rob Jones - album layout and design
- Stefano Felcini - photography
- John Garner - cover photograph
