= I Heart California =

Studio album by Admiral Radley
- Released: July 13, 2010
- Genre: Indie rock
- Label: The Ship

I Heart California is the debut studio album by American indie rock band Admiral Radley, a collaboration of members from the bands Grandaddy and Earlimart. It was released on July 13, 2010, by record label The Ship.

== Reception ==
Professional ratings
Review scores
Source	Rating
Consequence of Sound	2.5/5 stars
Filter	81%
Paste	7.3/10
PopMatters	5/10 stars

I Heart California received a generally mixed reception from critics. Phillip Cosores of Consequence of Sound called the album "a muddled mess of having too many cooks in the kitchen and no clear direction from a concept band with seemingly no real concept. Sure there are terrific moments, but by the end, one song stands out for it nearly self-aware statement 'it goes nowhere and it does nothing'."

== Track listing ==
No.	Title	Length
1.	"I Heart California"	4:20
2.	"Ghosts of Syllables"	3:51
3.	"Sunburn Kids"	3:43
4.	"Lonesome Co."	3:49
5.	"The Thread"	3:02
6.	"Red Curbs"	4:19
7.	"I'm All Fucked on Beer"	4:23
8.	"Ending of Me"	3:58
9.	"GNDN"	6:06
10.	"Chingas in the West"	4:55
11.	"I Left U Cuz I Luft U"	5:11
