= Jason Lytle =

American musician (born 1969)

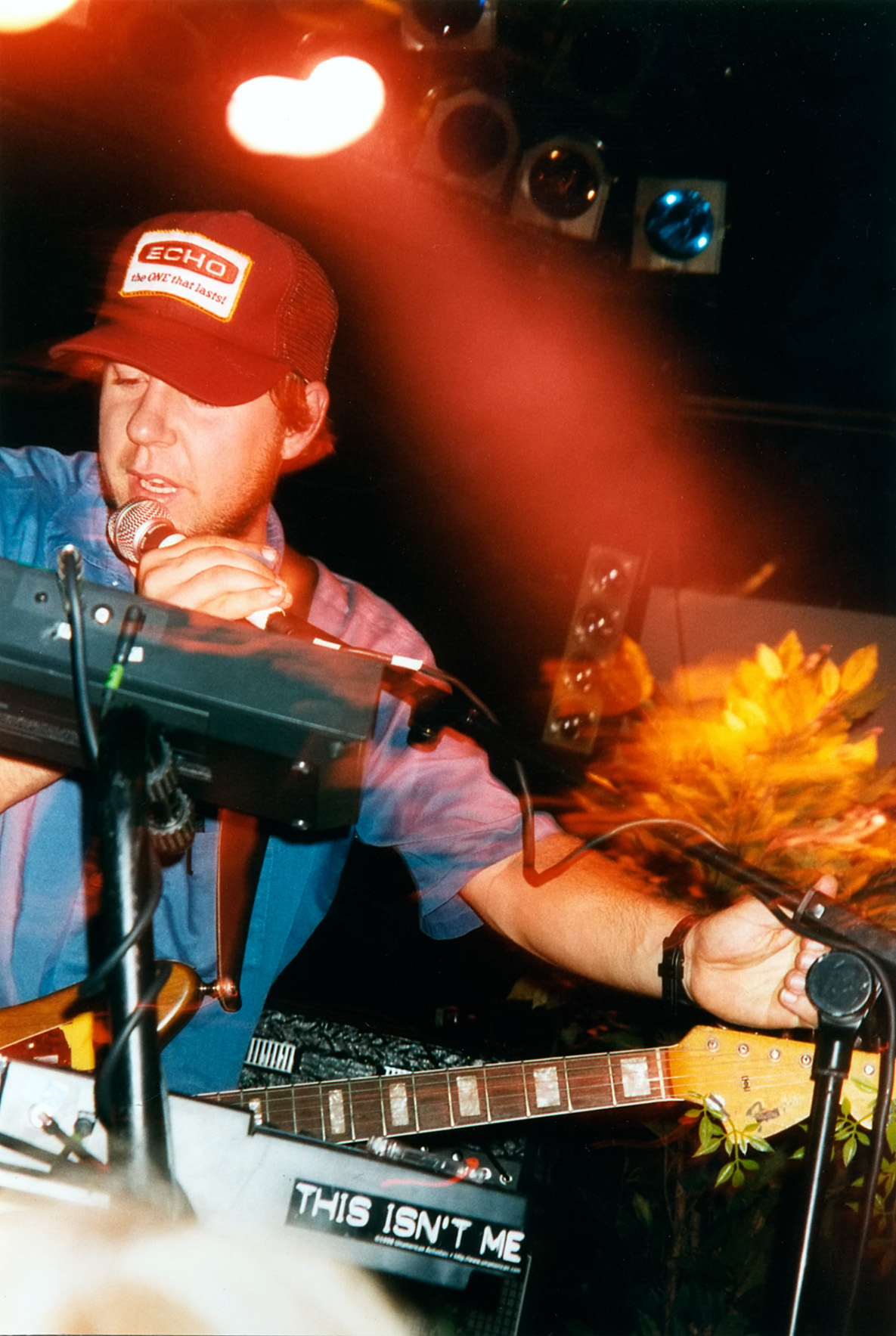
- Lytle live with Grandaddy in London, England, October 1998

Background information
- Born: Jason Quinn Lytle; March 26, 1969 (age 57); Modesto, California, United States
- Genres: Indie rock
- Occupations: Singer, songwriter, musician
- Instruments: Vocals, guitar, keyboards
- Years active: 1992–present
- Labels: V2, ANTI-, The Ship
- Website: jasonlytle.com

Jason Quinn Lytle (/ˈlaɪtəl/ LY-təl; born March 26, 1969) is an American musician best known for his work in the indie rock group Grandaddy. The group split in 2005, and Lytle continued to release music as a solo artist and in collaboration with other musicians. Grandaddy reformed in 2012. They ceased recording and touring again in 2017 following the sudden death of co-founder and bassist, Kevin Garcia. Grandaddy reformed again for a tour that began in the summer of 2025.

== Biography ==
=== Early life and Grandaddy ===
Lytle was born in Modesto, California and has an older sister, one older brother, a sister (deceased) and a stepsister. His father was in the grocery business, and his mother a housewife; they divorced when Lytle was aged seven. A fan of music at an early age, he played drums as a child. Skateboarding captured his interest in his teens, and by his late teens Lytle was a sponsored amateur. While laid up with a career-ending ACL injury, he started to play music again, writing songs and eventually setting up a home studio. Grandaddy came together gradually, signed to V2 Records, put out albums, and toured the world.

After spending years on the road, Lytle grew tired of the rock and roll lifestyle and recorded much of the band's fourth album, Just Like the Fambly Cat, on his own. In December 2005, six months prior to the release of Just Like the Fambly Cat, the band decided to break up: the reasons included elusive mainstream success, despite widespread critical acclaim, and lack of money. Early in 2006, Lytle moved to Montana from Modesto, where he had lived his whole life.

Mid-2006 saw Lytle briefly touring the U.S. in support of The Fambly Cat, playing new arrangements of Grandaddy songs as a duo with Rusty Miller of the band Jackpot. The tour was brokered as part of a deal to get V2 to agree to release a Grandaddy DVD that Lytle had in the works.

In December 2008, Lytle appeared in the music video for "I Am Lost (And the Moment Cannot Last)", which later was released on his debut album, Yours Truly, the Commuter. The video was shot in Sylmar, CA and directed by The General Assembly.

In 2010, Lytle collaborated with Sparklehorse and Danger Mouse and would record "Jaykub" that is featured on the Album "Dark Night Of The Soul".

In 2013 Lytle moved from Montana to Portland, Oregon. As of March 2015 Lytle was producing an LP for Band of Horses, and has stated that he will follow it with work on another Grandaddy album.

Lytle moved back to his hometown of Modesto, California in the summer of 2016. Grandaddy toured during 2016 and released its fifth studio album, Last Place, in March 2017.

=== Solo career ===
Lytle's debut solo album, Yours Truly, the Commuter, was released on May 19, 2009 on the ANTI- label.

On December 7, 2009, Lytle independently released an EP of seven improvised piano recordings as a "Merry X-mas" gift to fans through his website on Bandcamp. He also announced that he was working on a new album.

Lytle later joined with Aaron Burtch, a former Grandaddy bandmate, and Aaron Espinoza and Ariana Murray, of the band Earlimart, to form a new band called Admiral Radley. Their debut CD, entitled I Heart California, was released in the US on July 13, 2010, on Espinoza's The Ship label.

Lytle's solo studio album Dept. of Disappearance was released October 16, 2012. He released the live album House Show in December 2014, on Bandcamp.

In May 2015 Jason teamed up with Chokebore's Troy Von Balthazar on French radio station France Musique under the name "Jason Lytle, Troy Von Balthazar & The Color Bars Experience" to cover and perform Elliott Smith's Figure 8 with a chamber orchestra.

== Personal life ==
Lytle married his longtime girlfriend around 2011, but was divorced by around 2016. He credits the breakup of their relationship with inspiring 2017's Last Place.

== Discography ==
=== with Grandaddy ===
- A Pretty Mess by This One Band (1996)
- Under the Western Freeway (1997)
- The Sophtware Slump (2000)
- Sumday (2003)
- Just Like the Fambly Cat (2006)
- Last Place (2017)
- Blu Wav (2024)

=== with Admiral Radley ===
- I Heart California (2010)
- ADRAD Radio (2020)

=== with BNQT ===
- Volume 1 (2017)

=== Solo albums ===
- Yours Truly, the Commuter (2009)
- Merry X-Mas 2009 (2009)
- Music Meant to Accompany the Art of Ron Cameron (2010)
- Dept. of Disappearance (2012)
- House Show (2014)
- Arthur King Presents Jason Lytle: NYLONANDJUNO (2019)

EPs

- Prepare to Bawl (1992)
- Complex Party Come Along Theories (1994)
- Signal to Snow Ratio (1999)
- Through a Frosty Plate Glass (2001)
- Excerpts from the Diary of Todd Zilla (2005)

=== Compilation appearances ===
- All Together Now (2006, Little Monster/V2) (song: "All You Need Is Love")
- I Am the Resurrection: A Tribute to John Fahey (2006, Vanguard) (song: "Dance of the Inhabitants of the Palace of King Phillip XIV of Spain")
- Real Fun: Polaroids from the Independent Music Landscape (2007, PictureBox) (song: "Thee Everything")
- Kat Vox: A CD To Celebrate 20 Years of timmi-kat ReCoRDS (2011 timmi-kat ReCoRDS) (song: "Stereo Labrador")

=== Guest appearances ===
- The Band of Blacky Ranchette — Still Lookin' Good to Me (2003, Thrill Jockey) (drums, keyboards, vocals)
- The Crystal Method — Divided by Night (2009, Tiny E) (vocals on "Slipstream")
- Danger Mouse and Sparklehorse — Dark Night of the Soul — (2009) (vocals on "Jaykub" and "Everytime I'm with You")
- Donovan's Brain — Fires Which Burnt Brightly (2009, Career Records) (keyboards and vocals, "I Saw Your Light")
- Jackpot — Moonbreath (2007, Jackpine Social Club) (backing vocals)
- Kramies – The Wooden Heart EP (producer, synths "Sea Otter Cottage" "Clocks Were All Broken")
- M. Ward — Hold Time (2009, Merge)
- Sage Francis — Li(f)e (music, "Little Houdini")
- Kramies – Of All The Places Been & Everything the End EP (producer)
- Kramies - ‘’Kramies’’ LP 2022

=== Production ===
- Band of Horses – (2016, Produced album Why Are You OK)
