= Chokebore =

American indie rock band

- Origin: Honolulu, Hawaii, U.S.
- Genres: Alternative rock Indie rock
- Years active: 1993–2005; 2009–present
- Labels: Amphetamine Reptile, Boomba Rec, Punk iN My Vitamins, Pale Blue, Vicious Circle
- Members: Troy Balthazar; James Kroll; Jonathan Kroll; Christian Omar Madrigal Izzo
- Past members: Mike Featherson; Johnee Kop
- Website: www.chokebore.net

Chokebore is an American indie rock band formed in the early 1990s in Honolulu, Hawaii, and subsequently based in Los Angeles, California, United States. The group was active between 1993 and 2005 before taking a hiatus for 4 years. The group reformed in 2009 and is currently active. Over the course of the band's history they were most successful with European audiences, though are based and primarily toured in the United States.

AllMusic called Chokebore a "staple of the '90s indie-rock scene." The band is known for playing at glacial tempos. AllMusic described their album A Taste for Bitters as "snail-paced" and "depressing".

== History ==
Innovators of the then-emerging sadcore movement in indie rock in the 1990s, the eclectic rock group consisted of guitarist Jonathan Kroll, drummer Johnee Kop, vocalist Troy Von Balthazar, and bassist A Frank G. They formed in Honolulu in the early 1990s and moved to Los Angeles in 1992 because guitarist Jonathan Kroll was attending art school there. Shortly after the move, they were signed to Amphetamine Reptile Records in 1993, based on a demo tape the band had submitted.

Chokebore released their debut single "Nobody / Throats to Hit" and their first full-length Motionless later that year. Their changing tempos and moody outbursts were unlike many other AmRep bands at the time, but their more furious and quicker paced moments aligned themselves just enough. They toured with Guzzard and Today Is The Day as well as with other more well-known like-minded bands, including the Butthole Surfers, Samiam, Girls Against Boys and Nirvana on their last 10 American shows.

In support of 1995's Anything Near Water, they earned a strong following in Europe. Afterwards, Kopp was replaced on drums by Christian Omar Madrigal Izzo and Chokebore released their third album A Taste for Bitters in 1996. It was recorded and engineered by Peter Deimel at Black Box studio in France. Izzo departed from the band after the touring cycle and was replaced on drums by Mike Featherson. The band then released 1998's Black Black, and it represented a portrait of the band's darker side; loneliness, depression, death and sadness became recurring themes. The album was released on AmRep's European offshoot Boomba Records, but wasn't released stateside for another year, finally finding a home on Unwound's Punk in My Vitamins label.

Izzo returned to the band and replaced Featherson on drums in 1999. The band released It's a Miracle in 2002, which saw the band slightly less concerned with strict cohesion of the aesthetics and some songs were looser than on past releases ("Ciao L.A." is perhaps the most straightforward rock track the band has ever put to tape). The live album A Part From Life was released in 2003 and the band went on an indefinite hiatus in 2005.

During the following years, singer/guitar player Troy Von Balthazar recorded two solo albums in Europe, drummer Christian Omar Madrigal Izzo toured with Christian Death 1334 and guitarist Jonathan Kroll started his "slow and wordless" guitar project "A Newborn Riot Of Dreams".

On November 18, 2009, the band announced their reunion via homepage and newsletter: "We are happy to announce that Chokebore are getting back together again to play a handful of shows around Europe!" After a small series of European shows and festivals in 2010, Chokebore returned in October 2011 with the release of the five-track vinyl EP Falls Best, followed by a European tour in October/November 2011.

== Members ==
Current Members

- Troy Balthazar – vocals, guitar (1993–present)
- James Kroll – bass (1993–present)
- Jonathan Kroll – guitar (1993–present)
- Christian Omar Madrigal Izzo – drums (1995–1997, 1999–present)

Former Members

- Johnee Kop – drums (1993–1995)
- Mike Featherson – drums (1997–1999)

Timeline

== Discography ==
=== Studio albums ===
- Motionless (Amphetamine Reptile Records, 1993)
- Anything Near Water (Amphetamine Reptile Records, 1995)
- A Taste for Bitters (Amphetamine Reptile Records, 1996)
- Black Black (Boomba Rec, 1998)
- It's a Miracle (Pale Blue, 2002)

=== Live albums ===
- A Part from Life (Pale Blue, 2003)

=== EPs ===
- Strange Lines (Redwood Records, 2001)
- Falls Best (Vicious Circle Records, 2011)

=== Singles ===
- "Nobody / Throats to Hit" 7-inch (Amphetamine Reptile Records, 1993)
- "Thin as Clouds" 7-inch (Amphetamine Reptile Records, 1995)
- Split 7-inch with Tocotronic (Amphetamine Reptile Records / L'Âge d'or, 1996)
- It Could Ruin Your Day (Amphetamine Reptile Records, 1997)
- Days of Nothing (Amphetamine Reptile Records, 1997)
- Self-titled double 7-inch (Punk iN My Vitamins, 1999)

== Videography ==
- Coat (directed by David H. Moe, 1993)
- A Taste for Bitters (directed by Marcos Siega, 1996)
- It Could Ruin Your Day (directed by Darren Doane, 1997)
- You Are the Sunshine of My Life (directed by Darren Ankenman & Frank Grow, 1998)
- Where Is the Assassin? (directed by Darren Ankenman & Frank Grow, 1998)
- The Perfect Date (directed by Darren Ankenman & Frank Grow, 1998)
- Ciao L.A. (directed by Darren Ankenman & Frank Grow, 2002)
