= Tyler Ramsey =

American singer-songwriter

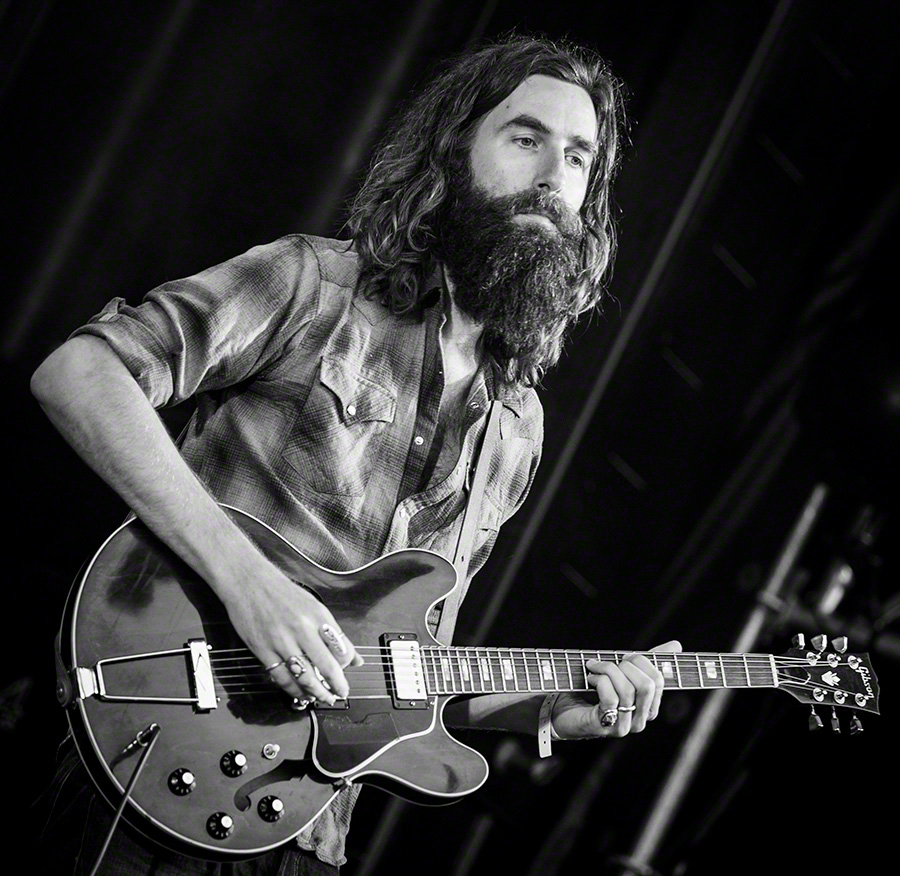
- Ramsey in 2016

Background information
- Born: Cincinnati, Ohio, United States
- Genres: Folk
- Occupation: Singer-songwriter
- Instruments: Guitar, harmonica, piano, percussion
- Label: Fantasy Records
- Formerly of: Band of Horses
- Website: http://www.tylerramsey.com/

Tyler Ramsey is an American singer-songwriter from Asheville, North Carolina.

== Career ==
Ramsey's eponymous debut album was released in 2005. His second album, A Long Dream About Swimming Across the Sea, was released on January 15, 2008, on Echo Mountain Records.

In November 2007, Stereogum singled him out for their "Artist to Watch" series, describing his sound as reminiscent of both Ryan Adams and Red House Painters. Summing up his musical style, the blog stated "He's sad, but more outwardly expressive: There's a ragged blues to Ramsey's voice as well as his guitar playing."

Ramsey's third album, The Valley Wind, was released on September 27, 2011.

In 2012, Tompkins Square Records released a 78 rpm record of Ramsey performing "Raven Shadow" and "Black Pines."

On February 7, 2019, Ramsey announced his fourth solo album, For the Morning, and released the lead single "A Dream of Home." His first album for Fantasy Records, For the Morning was released on April 5, 2019. Ramsey toured throughout North America in 2019 in support of the album, including select dates in the UK and Europe. The tour began on February 19, 2019, in Lexington, Kentucky, accompanied by indie rock musician Carl Broemel. Performances followed at the 2019 SXSW Festival, Willie Nelson's Luck Reunion, Mountain Jam, and solo dates with Strand of Oaks. On February 9, 2024, Ramsey released his 5th solo album New Lost Ages.

=== Band of Horses ===
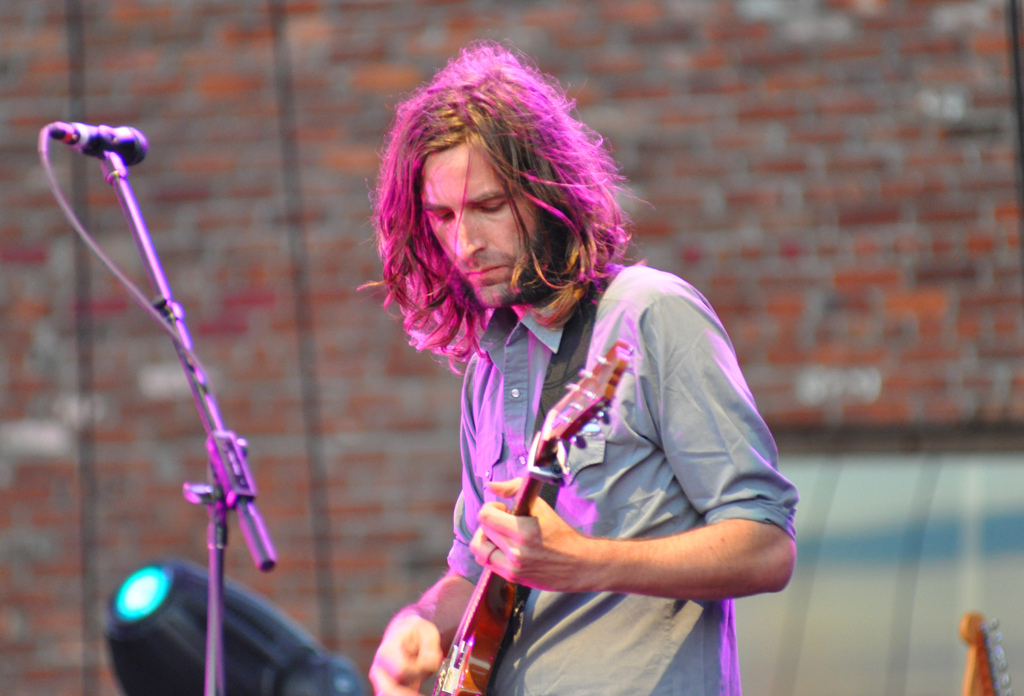
Ramsey playing with Band of Horses in Brooklyn, June 20, 2010

Bill Reynolds, bassist for Band of Horses, invited Ramsey to visit him and the rest of the band in South Carolina. Tyler quickly hit it off with lead singer Ben Bridwell, who asked him to open for the band on their fall tour of 2007 and come on board as their new guitar player.

Commenting on the opportunity to play both his solo material and with Band of Horses, Ramsey said, "This is going to be an amazing tour. To have the opportunity to play solo, as well as with such a great band, I really couldn't ask for more."

Ramsey became an integral member of Band of Horses. For their third album, Infinite Arms, he wrote the track "Evening Kitchen" on which he and Bridwell share the lead vocals. He also co-wrote three other tracks. Ramsey wrote and shared vocals with Bridwell on the song "Everything's Gonna Be Undone", from the band's fourth album, Mirage Rock, on which he co-wrote the songs "Shut-In Tourist" and "Heartbreak On the 101." On the band's fifth album Why Are You OK, Ramsey contributed the song "Country Teen."

On May 1, 2017, Ramsey announced his departure from the band.

== Discography ==
=== Studio albums ===
Year	Title	Label
2004	Tyler Ramsey	Self-released
2008	A Long Dream About Swimming Across the Sea	Echo Mountain Records
2011	The Valley Wind	Fat Possum Records
2019	For the Morning	Fantasy Records
2024	New Lost Ages	

=== Extended play ===
Year	Title	Label
2020	Found a Picture of You	Fantasy Records
