= Yours Truly, the Commuter =

Studio album by Jason Lytle
- Released: May 19, 2009
- Studios: The Warbler in Montana, U.S.
- Genres: Indie pop; indie rock
- Label: ANTI-
- Producer: Jason Lytle

Jason Lytle chronology
Yours Truly, the Commuter (2009)	Dept. of Disappearance (2012)

Yours Truly, the Commuter is the debut solo studio album by American indie rock musician Jason Lytle. It was released on May 19, 2009, by ANTI-.

== Reception ==
Professional ratings
Aggregate scores
Source	Rating
Metacritic	67/100
Review scores
Source	Rating
AllMusic	3.5/5 stars
The A.V. Club	C+
Entertainment Weekly	B
The Independent	3/5 stars
Mojo	3/5 stars
The New York Times	4/5 stars
NME	7/10
The Phoenix	1.5/5 stars
Pitchfork	7.4/10
Uncut	3/5 stars

Yours Truly, the Commuter was generally well received by critics. AllMusic called it "a gorgeously atmospheric record, a panorama of lush California landscapes filtered through the lonely lens of winter air and rural, mountainous terrain. There's a familiar mix of electronics and acoustic instruments here, but they're linked together more discreetly than before", calling it "more cohesive than many of those past [Grandaddy] albums". Pitchfork wrote: "Yours Truly, the Commuter sounds an awful lot like a Grandaddy album – not just another Grandaddy album, though, but a really good one, the best since Sumday."

Less favourable was The A.V. Club, writing: "Lytle settles for repetitive mood-setters that merely re-shuffle the elements he's been working with for more than a decade now, with no discernible progress or mastery."

== Track listing ==
All tracks are written by Jason Lytle.

No.	Title	Length
1.	"Yours Truly, the Commuter"	3:16
2.	"Brand New Sun"	4:22
3.	"Ghost of My Old Dog"	5:06
4.	"I Am Lost (And the Moment Cannot Last)"	2:20
5.	"Birds Encouraged Him"	4:25
6.	"It's the Weekend"	2:15
7.	"Fürget It"	3:52
8.	"This Song Is the Mute Button"	2:40
9.	"Rollin' Home Alone"	4:14
10.	"You're Too Gone"	2:41
11.	"Flying Thru Canyons"	3:07
12.	"Here for Good"	3:57

iTunes bonus track
No.	Title	Length
13.	"The Weather Girl"	3:51

iTunes pre-order bonus track
No.	Title	Length
14.	"This Song Is the Mute Button (Other Version)"

== Credits ==
- Jason Lytle – all instruments, production, mixing, recording, engineering, sleeve artwork

Additional personnel

- Ariana Murray – additional vocals on "I Am Lost"

Technical

- Thom Monahan – mixing
- Mark Chalecki – mastering
- Jen Murse – sleeve design

== Charts ==
Chart	Peak position
Belgian Albums Chart (Flanders)	42
French Albums Chart	175
