= Band of Horses =

American rock band

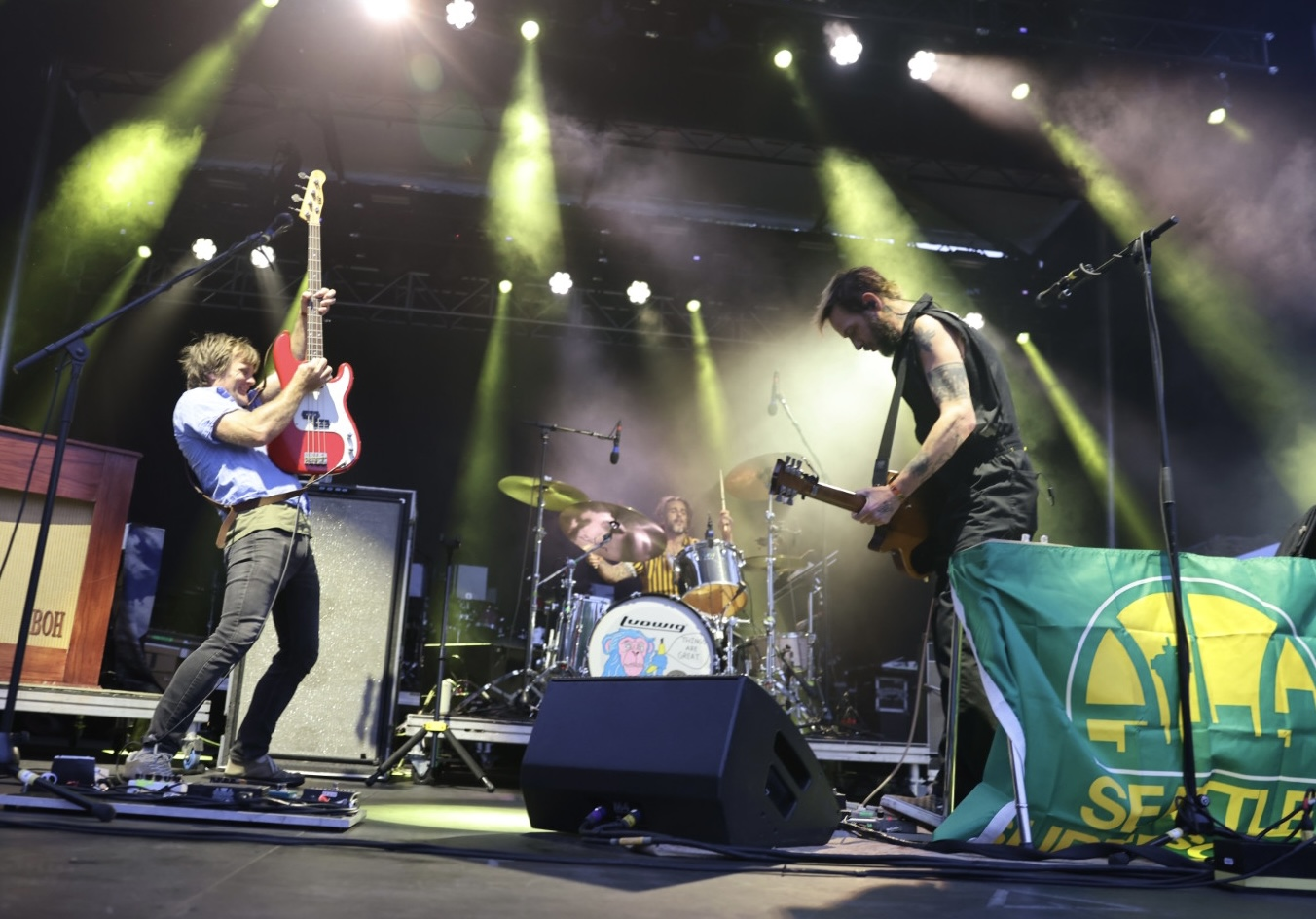
- Band of Horses performs at Bumbershoot in Seattle in 2023.

Background information
- Origin: Seattle, Washington (now based in Charleston, South Carolina)
- Genres: Indie rock; alternative rock; post-grunge
- Years active: 2004–present
- Labels: Sub Pop; Columbia; Fat Possum; Brown; Kobalt; Interscope; BMG
- Spinoffs: Grand Archives
- Spinoff of: Carissa's Wierd
- Members: Ben Bridwell; Creighton Barrett; Matt Gentling; Brett Nash; Joel Graves
- Past members: See Band members
- Website: bandofhorses.com

Band of Horses is an American rock band formed in 2004 in Seattle, Washington. Led by singer-songwriter Ben Bridwell, who has been the band's sole constant member throughout numerous line-up changes, the band's current line-up also includes longtime member Creighton Barrett (drums) alongside Matt Gentling (bass, backing vocals), Brett Nash (guitar, backing vocals), and Joel Graves (keyboards, guitar).

For ten years, the band's most stable line-up featured guitarist Tyler Ramsey and bassist Bill Reynolds, who recorded and performed with the band between 2007 and 2017, before acrimoniously departing.

To date, the band has released six studio albums: Everything All the Time (2006), Cease to Begin (2007), Infinite Arms (2010), Mirage Rock (2012), Why Are You OK (2016) and Things Are Great (2022), with Infinite Arms being nominated for a Grammy Award in 2011.

== History ==
=== Formation and Everything All the Time (2004–2006) ===
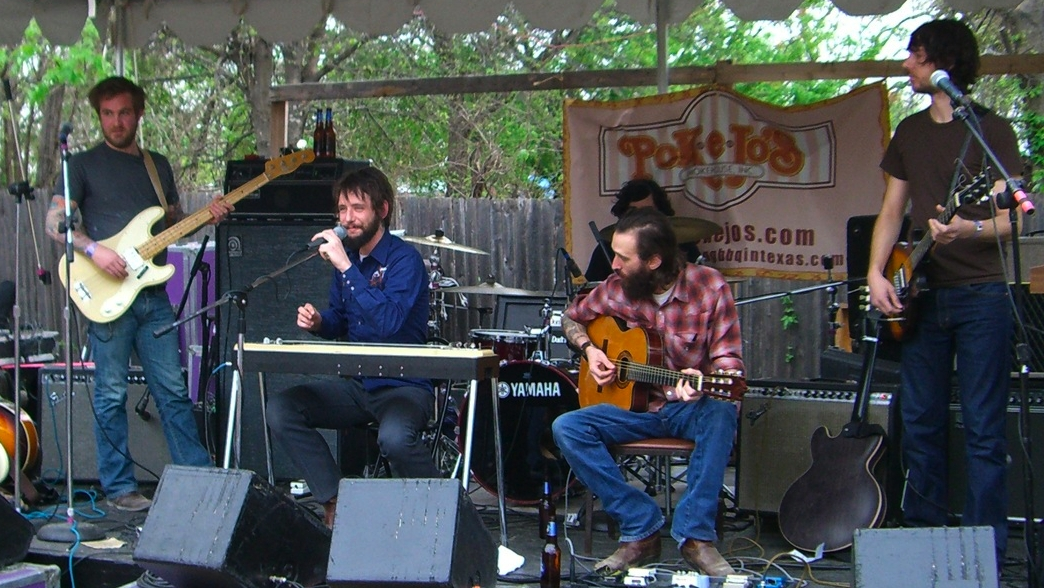
Band of Horses at the 2006 SXSW festival. From left to right Hampton, Bridwell, Barrett (hidden), Brooke, Arnone.

Ben Bridwell (vocals, guitar) formed Band of Horses, who were briefly known simply as Horses, in 2004 after the break-up of his previous band, Carissa's Wierd, along with bassist Chris Early and drummer Tim Meinig. They were soon joined by former Carissa's Wierd bandleader Mat Brooke (guitar, vocals). The band initially received attention from Sub Pop after opening for Iron & Wine during Seattle area shows. In 2005, the band released the Tour EP, which was sold at shows and on Sub Pop's website.

Their first full-length album, Everything All the Time, was recorded in 2005 with producer Phil Ek and released by Sub Pop on March 21, 2006. It features the band's original four-piece lineup, although both Tim Meinig and Sera Cahoone receive drumming credits. The album included new versions of five of the six songs from the Tour EP along with five new songs. It was a minor hit in Scandinavia, entering the lower reaches of the Sweden and Norway album charts. Ben Bridwell explained, "I thought before recording that I really wanted an ELO-sounding record, with strings and keyboards and synths, but then, as we got closer to it, we wanted to take a more raw approach."

Bridwell found that there was a personality clash between himself and Meinig and Early and the two left soon after the recording of the album. Ben explained his side of the story: "All of a sudden I was...with two guys I didn't really even know...they were nice guys, there just wasn't a personality match." For the subsequent tour, Joe Arnone (guitar and keyboards), Rob Hampton (bass and guitar) and Creighton Barrett (drums) were brought in to play with Bridwell and Brooke.

Everything All the Time's first single was "The Funeral", which has been used in numerous television series, films, video games, and advertisements. On July 13, 2006, the band performed the song on the Late Show with David Letterman without Brooke, who had left the band. Subsequently, he formed Grand Archives, who have since signed to Sub Pop and released two albums. Brooke explained how he joined Band of Horses: "So they ended up getting a show opening up for Iron and Wine in Seattle and Ben asked if I would just come up and do a couple songs, just 'cause we're friends. So...I did that. It was fun and then a couple of Iron and Wine tours came up...and then next thing I knew, we were in the studio making a record for Sub Pop." On why he left, he said, "I'd never really given the commitment to be a formal member. It was just a spur of the moment...and Everything All the Time took off really fast...I still didn't feel quite committed. It was still 100 percent Ben's project and I kinda wanted to see what else I could do."

=== Cease to Begin (2007–2009) ===
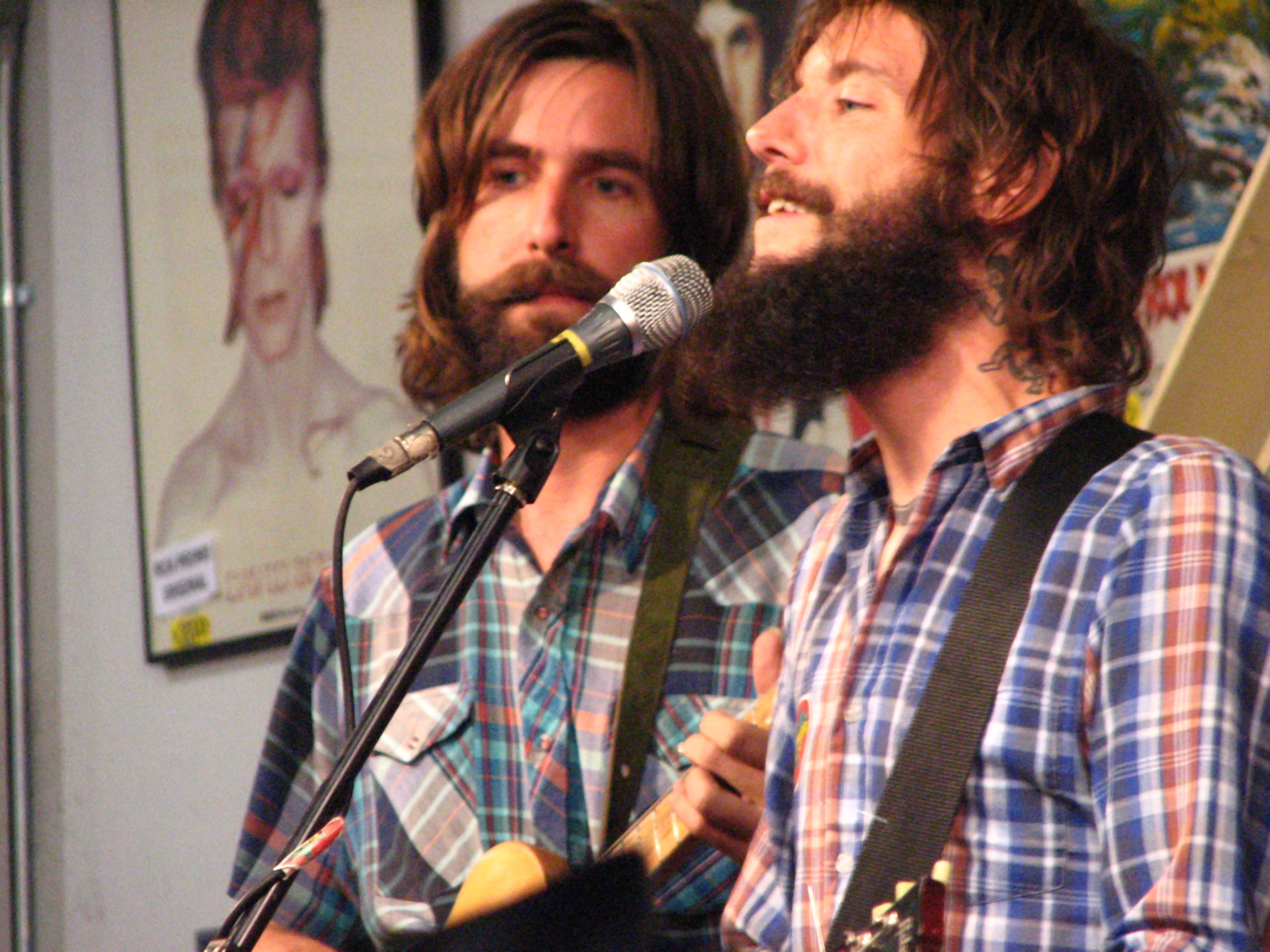
Ramsey and Bridwell in vocal and sartorial harmony at Amoeba Music, October 10, 2007

Before recording their second album, Bridwell decided to relocate the band from Seattle to his native South Carolina. He said, "We were touring so much that nowhere was really home, so I figured...if I'm gonna come home after these long stretches of traveling, it would nice to be around my family."

Band of Horses toured Europe and North America in 2007, prior to the release of their second album. Joe Arnone was no longer part of the band, which now toured as a six-piece band following the addition of Matt Gentling (Archers of Loaf – bass), Robin Peringer (Modest Mouse, Carissa's Wierd – guitar) and Ryan Monroe (keyboards) to the line up. The album, Cease to Begin, was recorded in Asheville, North Carolina and produced by Phil Ek. It was released by Sub Pop Records on October 9, 2007. The album features the core trio of Ben Bridwell, Creighton Barrett and Rob Hampton, with keyboards played by Ryan Monroe. Cease to Begin gave Band of Horses their first hit in the U.S. by reaching number 35 on the Billboard 200 and was also a hit in Norway, Denmark, France and Sweden. It was voted ninth best album of 2007 by Paste magazine and 47th best by Rolling Stone. The single "No One's Gonna Love You" gave Band of Horses their first European hit single, reaching number 22 in Denmark.

Following the release of Cease to Begin, Monroe became a permanent member of the band, along with new recruits Tyler Ramsey (guitar and vocals) and Bill Reynolds (bass). This once again made Band of Horses a six-piece band. In addition to his role in the band, Ramsey often performed solo as the opening act before the band play live.

In 2008, Band of Horses played at the Glastonbury Festival, T in the Park, the Bridge School Benefit concert, and the Roskilde Festival.

=== Infinite Arms (2010–2011) ===
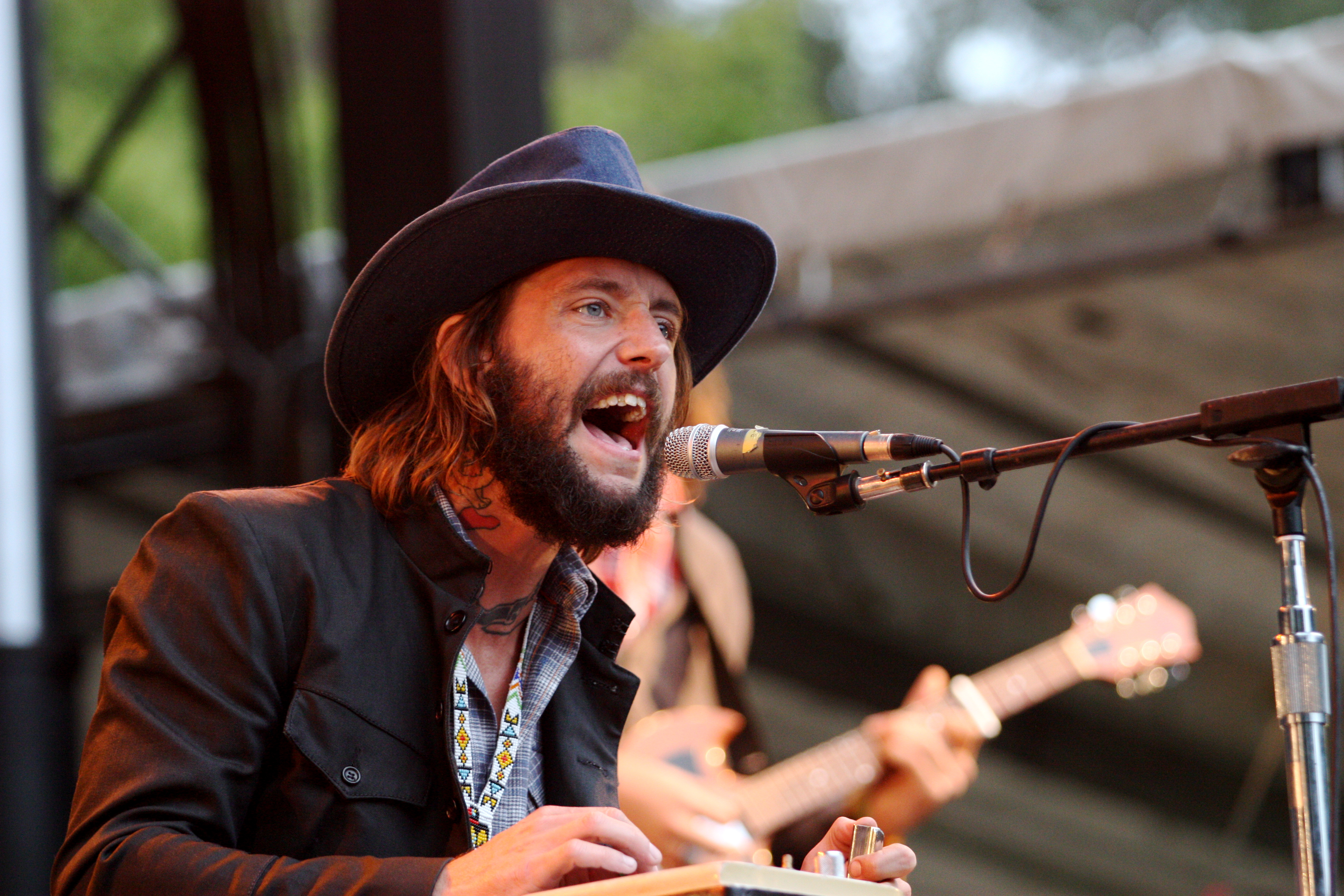
Ben Bridwell playing with Band of Horses at the Outside Lands Festival 2009

In May 2009, producer Phil Ek stated that he was recording the third Band of Horses album in North Carolina. Ben Bridwell mentioned that the new album was titled Night Rainbows several times while introducing new songs during the band's summer 2009 tour, but in a March 2, 2010 interview, the band revealed that the album was to be called Infinite Arms. Prior to the recording of the album, Rob Hampton left the band. He was later replaced by Swedish guitarist Ludwig Böss, although Böss does not appear on the album and on March 19, 2010, it was revealed that he too had left. The album was recorded by the five-piece lineup of Bridwell, Ramsey, Reynolds, Barrett, and Monroe.

Infinite Arms was released worldwide between May 14 and 19, 2010 on the Columbia, Brown, and Fat Possum labels. Aside from the North Carolina sessions at Echo Mountain Studios, parts of the album were recorded in Los Angeles at Perfect Sound Studios. The album was self-produced by the band, with additional production from Phil Ek. On April 14, the band performed a full set for the WDR TV show Rockpalast. On April 20, the band appeared on the BBC television series Later... with Jools Holland, promoting Infinite Arms by playing new songs "Compliments", "Factory", and "NW Apt". Following this appearance, the band's two earlier albums entered the UK Albums Chart for the first time. Infinite Arms entered the UK chart at number 21, giving Band of Horses their first top 100 UK chart hit and debuted at number 7 on the Billboard 200, far exceeding the performance of Cease to Begin. An outtake from the album, "Life on Earth" has been used on the soundtrack of the Twilight Saga film Eclipse, which was released on June 7, 2010.

Band of Horses toured Europe, North America, Australia, New Zealand and Japan in 2010. They opened for Pearl Jam on their tour of the Midwest and East Coast and for Snow Patrol at their concerts in Bangor and Glasgow in June. They played the SXSW, Sasquatch, Splendour in the Grass, Summer Sonic, Pukkelpop, Highfields, Malmo, Rock en Seine, Reading, Leeds, ACL and Farm Aid festivals in 2010.

On October 7, 2010, Band of Horses released a cover of Cee Lo Green's "Georgia" via their official website. Ben Bridwell said, "This began as a very random idea I had on my dad's patio after we watched our beloved Georgia Bulldogs football team get robbed of a win at the hands of the referees and LSU last year. This song is so nostalgic to me as my parents grew up in Atlanta and have so many family members in the great state of Georgia. It's always been a second home of sorts. We've played some great shows there as well, including our run of annual New Year's Eve shows in Atlanta from 2007–2009." The cover version Bridwell referred to is Cee Lo's version of "No One's Gonna Love You". The two tracks were released together as a 7-inch vinyl split single.

Band of Horses released a video for their song "Dilly" on November 16, 2010. Previous videos for songs from Infinite Arms had been collections of still photographs by the band's longtime collaborator Christoper Wilson, merged to make movies. "Dilly" was shot in the Mojave Desert by director Phil Andelman and was exclusively premiered on the movie website IMDb. The video features the exploits of a trouble-making motorcycle gang, and includes surreal sequences of the gang dancing in formation, as well as them killing people by shooting them with nothing more than a pointed finger. The collaboration with IMDb represents the first occasion that the website has premiered a music video. "Dilly" was released as a single on February 14, 2011, and includes the band's cover version of Cee-Lo Green's "Georgia". The single was a minor hit on the Belgian (Flanders) singles chart. Infinite Arms was nominated for a Grammy Award in the Best Alternative Album category and featured in several end-of-year "Best Albums of 2010" lists, including Q magazine (No. 21), NPR Listeners (No. 15), Filter magazine (No. 10) and Paste magazine (No. 14). The song "Laredo" was placed at number 28 in Rolling Stone magazine's top 50 songs of 2010.

In 2011, Band of Horses returned to Europe for a tour in January and February, which included a show with Foo Fighters at Wembley Arena on February 25. They undertook a brief US tour in early April before returning to Europe for several festivals in June. The band were scheduled to support Kings Of Leon on their US tour from July to September 2011 and their eight Australian concerts in November 2011, but Kings of Leon cancelled their US tour after just three shows. In 2012 the band toured for the first time in South America.

=== Mirage Rock (2012–2013) ===
In April 2012, Ben Bridwell said that Band Of Horses' fourth studio album was scheduled for release in late 2012 and would be produced by Glyn Johns. In June the band shared a video preview, via Facebook and YouTube, of a new song, "Dumpster World", and announced a September release for the album. On July 10 the album's title was confirmed as Mirage Rock and the track listing and artwork were revealed. A debut single from the fourth album, "Knock Knock", was released on July 9, 2012 and the album was released on September 18. "Knock Knock" and the subsequent single from Mirage Rock, "Slow Cruel Hands of Time", were both minor hits in Belgium.

In late August 2012, a music video for "Knock Knock" was released on the internet. Directed by Jared Eberhardt, the video simulates old fashioned nature documentaries and features members of the band being captured, like animals, to be studied. Bridwell said, "It seems fitting that we'd finally get to shoot a video around Salt Lake City, as we've got a song that pays tribute to the area called 'The Great Salt Lake' from our first album. Better late than never."

=== Acoustic at the Ryman (2014) ===
On February 24, 2014, Band of Horses released a ten-track live album, Acoustic at the Ryman, featuring stripped-down versions of some of their best-known songs. The album was recorded over two nights in April 2013 at the Ryman Auditorium in Nashville. The band played a 13-date run of acoustic performances across the U.S., which commenced on February 11 at the Wilshire Ebell Theatre and concluded on March 5 at The Ryman itself.

=== Why Are You OK and the departure of Ramsey and Reynolds (2015–2020) ===
On July 17, 2015, Ben Bridwell and Sam Beam of Iron and Wine released a covers album titled Sing into My Mouth. The fifth Band of Horses studio album, Why Are You OK is produced by Jason Lytle of the band Grandaddy and was released on June 10, 2016, through Rick Rubin's American Recordings and Interscope Records.

On May 1, 2017, Tyler Ramsey announced his departure from Band of Horses on his personal Instagram account. A day later, Bill Reynolds made a similar announcement via his Facebook page. When touring resumed on May 18 in Tallahassee, Band of Horses was joined by Richard Fitzpatrick on guitar and saw the return of bassist Matt Gentling, who had previously toured with the band prior to the recording of Cease to Begin. Fitzpatrick was subsequently replaced by guitarist Ian MacDougall. In 2022, Bridwell disputed Ramsey's and Reynolds's claims that they quit Band of Horses, saying that they had instead both been fired from the group.

=== Things Are Great, Acoustic At The Ryman Vol. 2, and Making Good Time (2021–present) ===
On October 12, 2021, Band of Horses issued the single "Crutch" and announced the release of Things Are Great, their first album with Matt Gentling and Ian MacDougall, and sixth overall. Calling it "a return to their earlier work and the kind of raw ethos that lies at the heart of Band of Horses", Things Are Great was released on March 4, 2022. Prior to the album's release, MacDougall exited the band and in late January 2022 was replaced by Brett Nash as lead guitarist.

The band released their long-awaited second volume of "Acoustic At The Ryman" on January 18, 2024. In support of the album, the band embarked on a 15-date "An Evening with Band of Horses" tour, performing both acoustic and electric sets in one show. They returned to the Ryman Auditorium on February 14 and 15 2024, almost a decade after they originally performed there in 2014.

Iron & Wine and Ben Bridwell released their second collaboration of cover songs, this time an EP called "Making Good Time" on September 12, 2025. Iron & Wine and Band of Horses embarked on a co-headlining tour in support of the EP.

== Band members ==
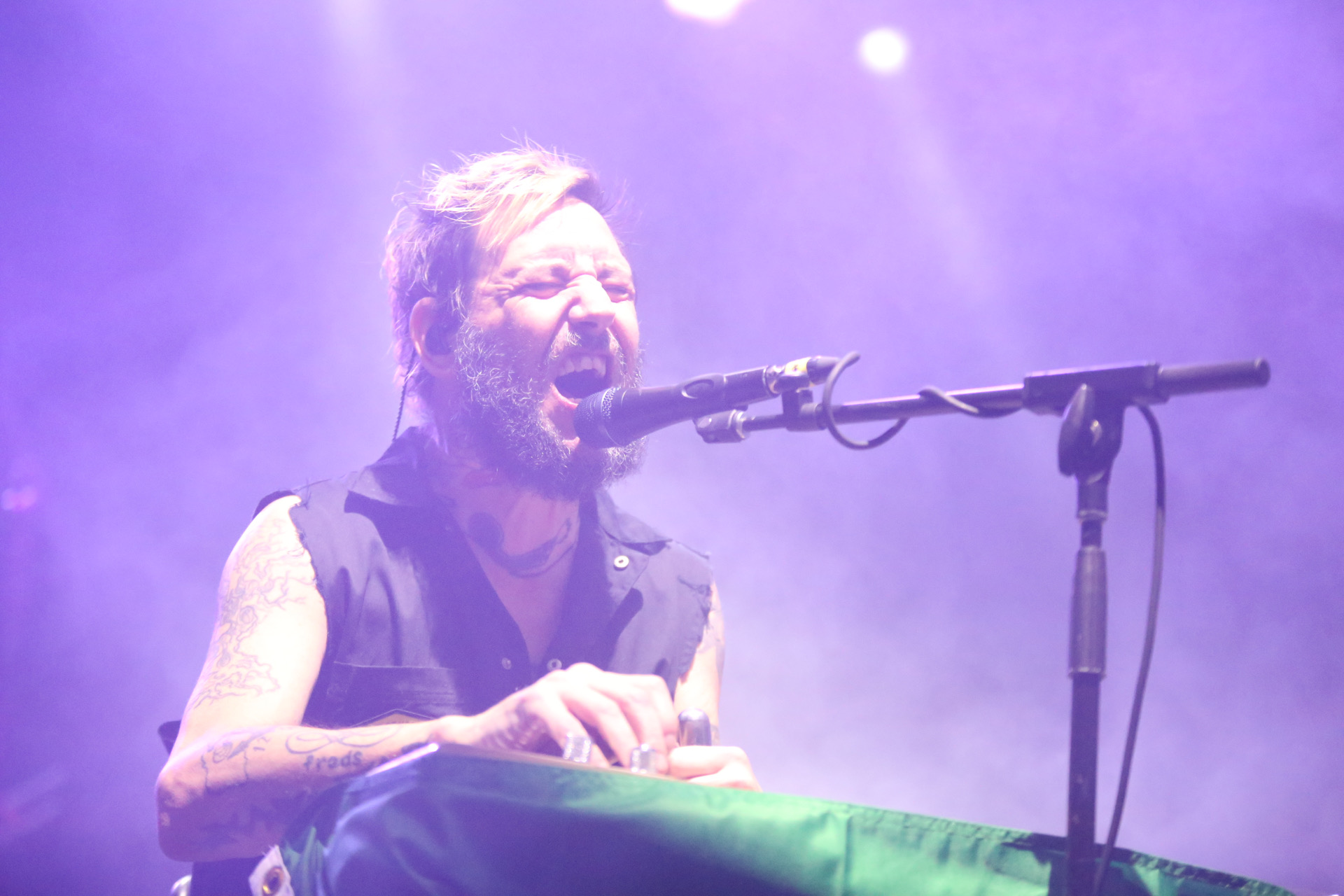
Band of Horses' founder and sole original member, Ben Bridwell.

Current

- Ben Bridwell – lead vocals, guitar, pedal steel, keyboards (2004–present)
- Creighton Barrett – drums, percussion (2005–present)
- Matt Gentling – bass, backing vocals (2007, 2017–present)
- Brett Nash – guitar, backing vocals (2022–present)
- Joel Graves – keyboards, guitar (2026–present)

Former

- Chris Early – bass (2004–2005)
- Tim Meinig – drums (2004–2005)
- Sera Cahoone – drums (2005)
- Mat Brooke – guitar, backing vocals (2004–2006)
- Joe Arnone – guitar, keyboards (2006–2007)
- Rob Hampton – bass (2005–2007), guitar (2007–2009)
- Robin Peringer – guitar (2007)
- Tyler Ramsey – guitar, backing vocals (2007–2017)
- Bill Reynolds – bass (2007–2017)
- Ludwig Böss – guitar (2009–2010)
- Richard Fitzpatrick – guitar (2017)
- Ian MacDougall – guitar, backing vocals (2017–2022)
- Ryan Monroe – keyboards, guitar, backing vocals (2007–2025)

== Discography ==
Studio albums

- Everything All the Time (2006)
- Cease to Begin (2007)
- Infinite Arms (2010)
- Mirage Rock (2012)
- Why Are You OK (2016)
- Things Are Great (2022)
