= List of Sub Pop artists =

The following artists have either been signed to the Sub Pop record label or had material released through it:

== # ==
- 10 Minute Warning
- 5ive Style

== A ==
- A Frames
- The Action Suits
- The Afghan Whigs
- The Album Leaf
- Agung Gede
- All Night Radio
- Arlo
- Avi Buffalo

== B ==
- Babes in Toyland
- Band of Horses
- Baptist Generals
- Bareminimum
- The Beach Boys ("I Just Wasn't Made for These Times" 7 inch promoting the Pet Sounds Sessions box, 1996)
- Beach House
- Beachwood Sparks
- Beat Happening
- Ben Sollee
- Best Kissers in the World
- Big Chief
- The Black Halos
- Billy Childish
- Blitzen Trapper
- Blood Circus
- The Blue Rags
- Bob's Burgers music albums
- Boyd Rice
- The Brunettes
- The Bug Club
- Built to Spill
- Bully

== C ==
- Chad VanGaalen
- CSS (Cansei de Ser Sexy)
- Cat Butt
- The Catheters
- Chappaquiddick Skyline
- Cartel Madras
- Chai
- Chemistry Set (from Seattle, WA)
- Chixdiggit
- Chris and Carla
- clipping.
- Cocorosie
- Codeine
- Combustible Edison
- Comets on Fire
- Constantines
- Corridor
- Cosmic Psychos
- Courtney Fortune
- Cullen Omori

== D ==
- Damien Jurado
- Damon & Naomi
- Daniel Martin Moore
- David Cross
- Dead Moon
- Deaf Wish
- Death Cab for Cutie
- Death Vessel
- Debby Friday
- Deeper
- Deep Sea Diver
- Deerhunter
- Dinosaur Jr
- Dickless
- Dntel
- Downtown Boys
- Heather Duby
- Duma
- Dum Dum Girls
- Dwarves

== E ==
- Earth
- The Elected
- Elevator to Hell/Elevator Through
- Eric Matthews
- Eric's Trip
- The Evil Tambourines
- Eugene Mirman

== F ==
- The Fartz
- The Fastbacks
- Finnigan's Baked
- Father John Misty
- Fleet Foxes
- Flight of the Conchords
- The Fluid
- Foals
- Forth Wanderers
- Frankie Cosmos
- Frausdots
- Friends of Dean Martinez
- Fruit Bats
- Fugazi

== G ==
- Gardener
- Gas Huffer
- Girl and Girl
- Girl Trouble
- Gluecifer
- GOAT
- The Go
- The Go! Team
- The Gotobeds
- Godflesh
- godheadSilo
- The Gotobeds
- Grand Archives
- Green Magnet School
- Green River
- The Grifters
- The Gutter Twins

== H ==
- Handsome Furs
- Hannah Jadagu
- Happy Birthday
- Hayden Pedigo
- The Hardship Post
- Hazel
- The Head and the Heart
- Hellacopters
- The Helio Sequence
- Helios Creed
- Heroic Doses
- Heron Oblivion
- His Electro Blue Voice
- Hole
- Holopaw
- The Homesick
- Hot Hot Heat
- Hot Snakes
- Husky

== I ==
- Iron & Wine

== J ==
- J Mascis
- Jale
- Jennifer Gentle
- Jesca Hoop
- Jeremy Enigk
- The Jesus and Mary Chain
- Julia Jacklin
- Julie Doiron
- Jo Passed
- Jon Benjamin - Jazz Daredevil

== K ==
- Kelley Stoltz
- King Tuff
- Kinski
- Kiwi Jr.
- Knife Fights
- Kyle Craft

== L ==
- L7
- Lael Neale
- Lala Lala
- Lee Bains III and the Glory Fires
- The Legend!
- Lethal Dosage
- Lex Walton
- Jason Loewenstein
- Loma
- Loney, Dear
- Looper
- Love as Laughter
- Love Battery
- Low
- Lubricated Goat
- Luluc
- LVL UP

== M ==
- Man Man
- Mark Lanegan
- Marika Hackman
- Mass Gothic
- The Makers
- Male Bonding
- Metz
- Memoryhouse
- Michael Yonkers
- Migala
- Mike & The Melvins
- Mirel Wagner
- Moaning
- Modest Mouse
- Mogwai
- Morgan Delt
- Mudhoney
- Murder City Devils

== N ==
- Nebula
- Nigel Quashie
- Nightcaps
- Niki & The Dove
- Nirvana
- No Age
- The Notwist

== O ==
- Obits
- OHMME
- Om
- Orville Peck
- Oxford Collapse

== P ==
- Patton Oswalt
- Papercuts
- Pedro the Lion
- Pernice Brothers
- Pigeonhed
- Pigface
- Pissed Jeans
- Pleasure Forever
- Plexi
- Poison 13
- Pond
- Porter Ray
- The Postal Service
- Preservation Hall Jazz Band

== Q ==
- Quasi

== R ==
- Radio Birdman
- Rapeman
- The Rapture
- Red House Painters
- Red Red Meat
- Reid Paley
- Rein Sanction
- The Reverend Horton Heat
- Rick and Morty
- Rolling Blackouts Coastal Fever
- Rogue Wave
- Rosie Thomas
- The Ruby Suns

== S ==
- S*M*A*S*H
- Saint Etienne
- Thee Satisfaction
- Screaming Trees
- Scud Mountain Boys
- Seaweed
- Sebadoh
- Sera Cahoone
- Shabazz Palaces
- Shearwater
- Shiner
- The Shins
- Sick and Wrong
- Six Finger Satellite
- Sleater-Kinney
- The Smashing Pumpkins ("Tristessa" 7 & 12 inch, 1990)
- Sonic Youth
- So Pitted
- Soul-Junk
- Soundgarden
- The Spinanes
- Spoek Mathambo
- Sprinkler
- Still Corners
- Steve Fisk
- Steven Jesse Bernstein
- Suki Waterhouse
- Sunn O)))
- Sunny Day Real Estate
- The Supersuckers
- Swallow
- Sweeping Promises

== T ==
- TAD
- Tacocat
- Tall Birds
- Ten Minute Warning
- Thomas Andrew Doyle
- Thee Headcoats
- The Homesick
- The Thermals
- Thornetta Davis
- The Thrown Ups
- THUMPERS
- Les Thugs
- Tiny Vipers
- Total Control
- Trembling Blue Stars
- Truly
- Tunde Adebimpe
- Turbonegro
- The Twilight Singers
- Twisted Teens
- The Tyde

== U ==
- Ugly Casanova
- U-Men

== V ==
- Vaselines (The Way of the Vaselines compilation, 1992)
- Velocity Girl
- Vetiver
- Vue

== W ==
- Walt Wagner
- The Walkabouts
- Washed Out
- Suki Waterhouse
- Weyes Blood
- The White Stripes
- The Wipers
- Wolf Eyes
- Wolf Parade

== Y ==
- The Yo-Yos
- Yuno

== Z ==
- Zen Guerrilla
- Zumpano
