= Banana Splits discography =

The Banana Splits are a fictional musical group of four animal characters; Fleegle, a dog; Bingo, a gorilla; Drooper, a lion; and Snorky, an elephant; played by actors in costume miming to music created for them, who starred in their own successful television series The Banana Splits Adventure Hour.

The Banana Splits' bubblegum pop rock and roll was provided by studio professionals, including Al Kooper ("You're the Lovin' End"), Barry White ("Doin' the Banana Split"), and Gene Pitney ("Two Ton Tessie"). Jimmy Radcliffe provided his songs ("I'm Gonna Find a Cave", "Soul", "Don't Go Away Go-Go Girl", "Adam Had 'Em" and "The Show Must Go On") but did not contribute vocals to Splits recordings. The music director was music publisher Aaron Schroeder who picked the songs created by his staff writers. The intended main theme song was to be the Ritchie Adams and Tony Powers song "We're the Banana Splits" but the television and advertising executives thought the "Tra La La Song", another Adams composition co-written with prolific songwriter and producer Mark Barkan, was a catchier theme.

According to an interview in DISCoveries magazine, Adams and Barkan sang "Wait Til Tomorrow", "We're the Banana Splits" and "The Tra La La Song". David Mook produced all of the released tracks (co-producing the single sides Long Live Love and Pretty Painted Carousel with Aaron Schroeder), credited as "A Past, Present, and Future Production by David Mook for Hanna-Barbera Productions, Inc." (Mook also co-wrote the theme songs for Chuck Barris's The Dating Game and The Newlywed Game). Arranger Jack Eskew also orchestrated some of the Splits' tunes. Three singles, "The Tra La La Song", "Wait Till Tomorrow", and "Long Live Love" were released by the Splits along with an album, We're the Banana Splits. Two 45 rpm EP records with four songs each were available via an offer on the back of Kellogg's cereal boxes. Two of the three singles as well as both EPs were issued with picture sleeves.

== Life after the series ==
A bootleg recording of all the released Splits recordings was made and released on CD in 1995 on the Hollywood Library label (this CD was mastered from vinyl sources at a slightly increased speed, with excessive noise-reduction, resulting in a noticeable echo effect, especially at the ends of the songs). One song, "Wait Til Tomorrow", later appeared on a various artists bubblegum hits CD, sourced from the Hollywood Library bootleg. Most recently, an unauthorized vinyl pressing was issued in 2007 by Ripped Couch Records in the UK. This pressing has a different track listing than the original album, consisting of the first 16 tracks on the Hollywood Library bootleg CD (one track from the original album, "Soul" written by noted soul singer songwriter Jimmy Radcliffe, is missing from this version despite its being listed on the front cover). The audio was sourced from the Hollywood Library CD.

The Californian punk band The Dickies released a sped-up version of "The Tra La La Song" as the "Banana Splits (Tra La La Song)" which entered the UK charts in 1979.

The Bob Marley and the Wailers song "Buffalo Soldier", from the 1983 album Confrontation, features a melody similar to "The Tra La La Song" in its chorus. The melody comes from the public domain song “Shortnin' Bread.”

In 1988, "I'm Gonna Find a Cave" was covered by Girl Trouble for the Sub Pop 200 compilation

The Mr. T Experience recorded "Don't Go Away Go-Go Girl" for the 1993 Banana Splits tribute album Banana Pad Riot on the Skull Duggery Label. Mr. T Experience also included "Don't Go Away Go-Go Girl" as a bonus track on their 1997 Lookout Records re-issue of the 1989 release Big Black Bugs Bleed Blue Blood and as a hidden track on the Our Bodies Our Selves release, also from 1993. "Banana Pad Riot" also featured recordings from punk bands The Vindictives ("Two Ton Tessie"), Boris The Sprinkler ("We're the Banana Splits"), and The Young Fresh Fellows ("Doin' The Banana Split").

Liz Phair and Material Issue recorded "The Tra La La Song" for the 1995 compilation album Saturday Morning: Cartoons' Greatest Hits. Their version was based on the Decca Records single version, with a different arrangement than the version used on the TV series, and also including an otherwise unheard additional verse.

Ralph's World covered "The Tra La La Song" in 2001 on their album At the Bottom of the Sea.

In 2005, "I Enjoy Being A Boy" was covered by They Might Be Giants for their first podcast. The separate mp3 was released for free on their site.

== Discography ==
=== 45 rpm singles ===
- "Wait Til Tomorrow"/"We're the Banana Splits" (1968) Decca 32391 (#96 in Canada, October 23, 1968)
- "The Tra La La Song (One Banana, Two Banana)" (single version)/"Toy Piano Melody" (1968) Decca 32429
- "Long Live Love"/"Pretty Painted Carousel" (1969) Decca 73256

All Decca singles were released in mono mixes. "Long Live Love" and "Pretty Painted Carousel", along with the single version of "The Tra La La Song (One Banana, Two Banana)", were not included on the We're the Banana Splits album. The single version of "The Tra La La Song" is an entirely different arrangement and recording of the song from the one on the We're the Banana Splits album and the TV show and features an additional verse. Decca singles 32429 and 73256 were issued with picture sleeves; Decca 32391 was not—although foreign releases of the first single had picture sleeves.

=== 45 rpm extended play records ===
- Kellogg's Presents The Banana Splits Sing'n Play The Tra-La-La Song (One Banana, Two Banana)

(1969) Hanna-Barbera Premium Division #34578 (with picture sleeve)

Side One: "The Tra La La Song (One Banana, Two Banana)" (alternate mix)/"That's The Pretty Part Of You"
Side Two: "It's A Good Day For A Parade"/"The Very First Kid On My Block"

- Kellogg's Presents The Banana Splits Sing'n Play Doin' the Banana Split

(1969) Hanna-Barbera Premium Division #34579 (with picture sleeve)

Side One: "Doin' The Banana Split" (alternate mix)/"I Enjoy Being A Boy (In Love With You)"
Side Two: "The Beautiful Calliopa"/"Let Me Remember You Smiling"

"The Tra La La Song" and "Doin' The Banana Split" are the same takes included on the We're the Banana Splits album. However, as released here, they are presented in "twin-track" stereo mixes, with vocals in one channel and instruments in the other, not unlike some of the early Beatles stereo mixes. The stereo mixes of the other six songs are similar, but mixed less widely with both vocals and instruments closer to the center. These records were sold together as a Kellogg's cereal box offer and were released through Hanna-Barbera's premium division. They came in a mailer including unique outer artwork, showing Fleegle holding the two discs. Both were issued in art sleeves featuring drawings of the characters; advertisements promoting these discs on the back of contemporary Kellogg's cereal boxes showed slightly different artwork and had a copyright date of 1968, even though those 45 rpm extended play records were released in 1969. In the prototype artwork for the second disc used in the cereal box ad, it is more clear that the Banana Buggy is driving atop the surface of a 45 rpm record.

=== Album ===
- We're the Banana Splits (1968) Decca DL-75075

Side One: "We're the Banana Splits"/"I'm Gonna Find a Cave"/"This Spot"/"Doin' The Banana Split"/"Toy Piano Melody"/"Soul"
Side Two: "The Tra La La Song (One Banana, Two Banana)"/"Wait Til Tomorrow"/"You're The Lovin' End"/"In New Orleans"/"Two Ton Tessie"/"Don't Go Away—Go-Go Girl"

All songs on the album are true stereo mixes. There are two minor cover variations. The earliest pressings had a dark green color and had no copyright notice, which on some copies was added on a small yellow sticker. Later pressings are a lighter shade of green and have a copyright notice printed directly in the lower left corner of the front cover.

Counterfeit versions of the album appeared in the late 1990s. They carry a white promo Decca label, but have all other references to Decca Records removed, including the front cover logo. The songs also fade out slightly earlier than on the original album.

=== Compact discs ===
- We're the Banana Splits / Here Come the Beagles (1995) Hollywood Library HL-75075
  - "The Tra La La Song (One Banana, Two Banana)" (album version)
  - "We're the Banana Splits"
  - "I'm Gonna Find a Cave"
  - "This Spot"
  - "Doin' the Banana Split"
  - "Wait Til Tomorrow"
  - "You're the Lovin' End"
  - "Toy Piano Melody"
  - "In New Orleans"
  - "Two-Ton Tessie"
  - "Long Live Love"
  - "Don't Go Away—Go-Go Girl"
  - "It's a Good Day for a Parade"
  - "Pretty Painted Carousel"
  - "I Enjoy Being a Boy (In Love With You)"
  - "The Tra La La Song (One Banana, Two Banana)" (single version)
  - "Looking for the Beagles"
  - "Sharing Wishes"
  - "I'd Join the Foreign Legion"
  - "What More Can I Do?"
  - "Be the Captain"
  - "Humpty Dumpty"
  - "Thanks to the Man on the Moon"
  - "I Wanna Capture You"
  - "Indian Love Dance"
  - "You Satisfy"
  - "That's the Pretty Part Of You"
  - "The Very First Kid on My Block"
  - "The Beautiful Calliopa"
  - "Let Me Remember You Smiling"
  - "Soul"

This was an unauthorized CD reissue of the complete Banana Splits discography, including the We're the Banana Splits album, along with all other non-LP songs released as singles or EP tracks. Song titles in italics are not by the Banana Splits; they are from Here Come the Beagles, the soundtrack album from the Total TV cartoon series. All the Beagles tracks are in re-channeled stereo.

=== Songs featured in the television series but not released on records ===
- "Doin' the Banana Split" (alternate vocal) (show #2, first broadcast 1968-09-14)
- "The Show Must Go On" (show #2, first broadcast 1968-09-14)
- "I'd Be a Millionaire" (show #6, first broadcast 1968-10-12)
- "Adam Had 'Em" (show #9, first broadcast 1968-11-02)
- "The Beautiful Calliopa" (alternate version) (show #11, first broadcast 1968-11-16)
- "A Place for the Music to Come Out" (show #13, first broadcast 1968-11-30)
- "You Had Your Chance" (show #15, first broadcast 1968-12-14)

=== Songs released on records but not featured in the television series ===
- "In New Orleans"
- "Don't Go Away—Go-Go Girl"
- "Let Me Remember You Smiling"
- "Long Live Love"
- "Pretty Painted Carousel"
