= Free the West Memphis 3 =

Compilation album
- Released: October 10, 2000
- Genre: Rock
- Length: 47:55
- Label: Koch (33384)
- Producer: Danny Bland, Scott Parker, Eddie Spaghetti

Free the West Memphis 3 is a compilation album released in October 2000 by Koch Records as a benefit for the legal defense of the West Memphis Three, three men who, while teenagers in 1994, were tried and falsely convicted of the 1993 murders of three boys in West Memphis, Arkansas. The album was organized by guitarist Danny Bland (of the bands Cat Butt, Best Kissers in the World, and the Dwarves), Eddie Spaghetti of the Supersuckers, and Scott Parker, who served as executive producers of the project.

The liner notes, written by Burk Sauls, assert that the conviction of Damien Echols, Jessie Misskelley Jr., and Jason Baldwin was a miscarriage of justice: "There is no physical evidence against them. No witnesses. Nothing aside from coerced statements and the vague, incomplete testimony of children", he wrote, stating that the three were limited by poverty to inexperienced public defenders and that "everything about the trials was biased against them, but it didn't matter to the jury because Damien, Jason, and Jessie looked 'evil' to the locals. They were teenagers who liked the kind of music that's on this [album]. They wrote poetry and read Stephen King and Shakespeare and wore black concert T-shirts. That was enough for the judge and jury." The notes advertised the Justice Project's Campaign Against Wrongful Executions and directed readers to wm3.org, a website devoted to freeing Echols, Misskelley, and Baldwin.

The album includes fifteen tracks recorded exclusively for the compilation, eight of which are original compositions while the rest are cover versions. Several tracks are collaborations between artists: Joe Strummer teamed with the Long Beach Dub Allstars for a cover version of Jimmy Cliff's "The Harder They Come"; the Supersuckers featured Pearl Jam singer Eddie Vedder on their cover of X's "Poor Girl"; Tony Scalzo of Fastball was joined by Joey Schuffied and former Scream and Foo Fighters guitarist Franz Stahl for his song "Indicted"; and Mark Lanegan teamed with former Soundgarden bassist Ben Shepherd, former Guns N' Roses bassist Duff McKagan, former Dinosaur Jr. bassist Mike Johnson, and industrial rock musician Bill Rieflin (then of KMFDM) for his song "Untitled Lullaby". A portion of Jello Biafra's spoken word piece "The Murder of Mumia Abu-Jamal" (from his 1998 album If Evolution Is Outlawed, Only Outlaws Will Evolve) follows Rocket from the Crypt's song "Wrong and Important".

== Reception ==
Jeremy Salmon of Allmusic rated Free the West Memphis 3 three stars out of five, calling it "a fine collection of mainly punk rock covers, with some extra variety sprinkled in" and noting Tom Waits' track as a highlight while stating that "most of the tracks are on the subject of capital punishment, but some of the cover choices (see Zeke's version of 'Wrathchild' by Iron Maiden) seem to be positive support for the prisoners coming in a singular form."

== Track listing ==
Writing credits adapted from the album's liner notes.

| No. | Title | Writer(s) | Performer | Length |
|---|---|---|---|---|
| 1. | "The Truth" | Steve Earle | Steve Earle | 2:21 |
| 2. | "Wrong and Important" (includes a portion of "The Murder of Mumia Abu-Jamal" by Jello Biafra, from If Evolution Is Outlawed, Only Outlaws Will Evolve, 1998) | John Reis | Rocket from the Crypt | 3:34 |
| 3. | "Boys in Black" | Suzi Gardner, Donita Sparks | L7 | 3:09 |
| 4. | "Heavy Heart" (originally performed by You Am I) | Tim Rogers | Supersuckers | 3:29 |
| 5. | "The Harder They Come" (originally performed by Jimmy Cliff) | Jimmy Cliff | Joe Strummer and the Long Beach Dub Allstars with Tippa Irie | 3:50 |
| 6. | "Rains on Me" | Tom Waits, Chuck E. Weiss | Tom Waits | 3:20 |
| 7. | "Poor Girl" (originally performed by X) | John Doe, Exene Cervenka | Supersuckers with Eddie Vedder | 2:44 |
| 8. | "Indicted" | Tony Scalzo | Tony Scalzo with Franz Stahl and Joey Schuffied | 3:37 |
| 9. | "Wrathchild" (originally performed by Iron Maiden) | Steve Harris | Zeke | 2:42 |
| 10. | "Fucking Hostile" (originally performed by Pantera) | Phil Anselmo, Diamond Darrell, Rex Brown, Vinnie Paul | Kelley Deal | 3:03 |
| 11. | "Hwy 5" | Doe, Cervenka | The John Doe Thing | 2:50 |
| 12. | "Untitled Lullaby" | Mark Lanegan | Mark Lanegan with Ben Shepherd, Duff McKagan, Mike Johnson, and Bill Rieflin | 3:02 |
| 13. | "She" (originally performed by the Misfits) | Glenn Danzig | The Murder City Devils | 1:31 |
| 14. | "Highway to Hell" (originally performed by AC/DC) | Angus Young, Malcolm Young, Bon Scott | Nashville Pussy | 3:25 |
| 15. | "Our Last Goodbye" | Jaz Coleman, Paul Raven, Chris Vrenna, Geordie Walker | Killing Joke | 5:18 |
| Total length: | | | | 47:55 |

== Personnel ==
Adapted from the album's liner notes.

- Danny Bland – executive producer
- Scott Parker – executive producer
- Eddie Spaghetti – executive producer
- Lance Mercer – photography
- Grove Pashley – photography
- Zavo Henks – art direction and design
