= U-Men (album) =

Compilation album by The U-Men
- Released: November 3, 2017
- Recorded: 1982–89
- Genres: Punk rock; garage punk; noise rock; grunge
- Length: 89:50
- Label: Sub Pop
- Producers: Chris Hanszek; John Nelson; John Rubato; Tina Casale

The U-Men chronology
Solid Action (1999)	U-Men (2017)

Professional ratings
Review scores
Source	Rating
AllMusic	4.5/5 stars
Louder	4/5 stars
Pitchfork	8.2/10

U-Men is a compilation album by Seattle-based punk rock band The U-Men, released on November 3, 2017, by Sub Pop. The compilation consists of the complete catalogue from the band, recorded between 1982 and 1989.

The compilation includes the five previously unreleased songs: "Trouble Under Water", "Mystery Pain", "Last Lunch", "U-Men Stomp", and "Selfish", as well as a 32-page booklet including previously unseen photographs, liner notes, and interviews from the band.

== Background ==
The U-Men were a Seattle-based punk rock band active between 1980 and 1989, with their musically rough sound being considered a precursor to grunge, coming out of Seattle. The compilation, containing the band's whole catalogue, encompasses post-punk, roots, goth, surf, and psychobilly influences. They were considered a credible precursor to grunge, with Robert Ham of Pitchfork commenting: "For as large as their shadow looms among a generation of musicians in Seattle, there’s not much in the U-Men’s sound that feels too connected to the grunge aesthetic." Contrasting with Mark Deming of AllMusic: "The U-Men were a lot closer to punk than grunge, but their music was a lot smarter and more exploratory than the vast majority of what was coming out of the hardcore underground at the same time."

== Critical reception ==
U-Men was released to favorable reviews from music critics. Robert Ham of Pitchfork gave the album 8.2/10 and commented: "Within U-Men’s chosen framework, the band found plenty of variation and ways to rip at their own seams." Mark Deming of AllMusic gave it 4.5 out of 5 stars and commented: "Nearly 30 years after the group called it a day, the material on U-Men barely seems to have aged at all; like the best rock & roll outliers, the U-Men created something that was less a product of a specific time and place than music that existed in a world of its own, and that planet is still a wild, fractured, and thoroughly compelling place to visit in the 21st century." Louder would give the album a 4 out of 5 stars as well.

== Track listing ==
All tracks are written by The U-Men, excluding "Bad Little Woman."

Disc 1 (1-4 U-Men, 8-13 Stop Spinning, 14, 16-17 (singles/appearances); 5-7, 15 (unreleased)
No.	Title	Length
1.	"Blight"	2:36
2.	"Flowers DGIH"	4:22
3.	"Shoot 'Em Down"	4:07
4.	"Gila"	2:18
5.	"Trouble Under Water"	2:44
6.	"Mystery Pain"	3:31
7.	"Last Lunch"	2:07
8.	"Clubs"	4:20
9.	"The Fumes"	3:23
10.	"Cow Rock"	2:43
11.	"Green Trumpet"	3:52
12.	"A Year and a Day"	3:52
13.	"Ten After One"	2:56
14.	"They!"	3:32
15.	"U-Men Stomp"	4:12
16.	"Solid Action"	2:11
17.	"Dig It a Hole"	2:19

Disc 2 (1-9 Step on a Bug, 10-12 (singles/appearances), 13 (unreleased)
No.	Title	Length
1.	"Whistlin' Pete"	2:46
2.	"2 X 4"	2:00
3.	"A Three Year Old Could Do That"	2:34
4.	"Juice Party"	1:58
5.	"Flea Circus"	2:56
6.	"Too Good to Be Food"	2:19
7.	"Willie Dong Hurts Dogs"	2:03
8.	"Papa Doesn't Love His Children Anymore"	3:32
9.	"Pay the Bubba"	3:00
10.	"Freezebomb"	2:24
11.	"That's Wild About Jack"	3:34
12.	"Bad Little Woman"	2:33
13.	"Selfish"	2:07
Total length:		89:50

=== Notes ===
- "Flowers DGIH" contains the two-note drone guitar from Jim Tillman
- "Shoot 'Em Down" contains bass from Tom Price and guitar from Jim Tillman
- "Green Trumpet" contains percussion from David Duet, Kathryn Troester, Larry Reid, and Michael Tucker
- "They!" contains backing vocals from Bill Henderson and David Duet
- "Solid Action" and "Dig It a Hole" contains bass from John Bigley
- "Pay the Bubba" contains guitar from Tom Hazelmyer
- "Bad Little Woman" is written by Brian Rosbotham, Herbie Armstrong, Rob Demick, Tito Tinsley, and Victor Catling

== Companies ==
- Phonographic copyright by Sub Pop Records
- Recorded at Crow Studios
- Recorded at Ironwood Studios
- Mixed at Soundhouse Recording
- Mastered at Ultraviolet Studios
- Glass mastered at Technicolor, Olyphant, PA
- Pressed by Technicolor, Olyphant, PA

== Personnel ==
- Art direction, design – Jeff Kleinsmith
- Bass – Jim Tillman (tracks: 1-1 to 1-17) and Tony Ransom (tracks: 2-1 to 2-13)
- Label coordinator – Dean Whitmore
- Drums – Charlie Ryan
- Executive Producer – Jack Endino
- Guitar – Tom Price
- Liner notes – Alex Kostelnik
- Mastered by Steve Turnidge
- Mixed by Jack Endino (tracks: 1-5 to 1-7, 1-15, 2-13)
- Photography by Cam Garrett, Charles Peterson, Russ Battaglia, and Valerie Broatch
- Producer - Chris Hanzsek (tracks: 1-14) and Tina Casale (tracks: 1-14)
- Producer, engineer – John Nelson (tracks: 1-1 to 1-4, 1-7 to 1-12, 1-15 to 1-17, 2-1 to 2-13) and Johnny Rubato (tracks: 1-5, 1-6)
- Vocals by John Bigley
- Written by The U-Men (tracks: 1-1 to 2-11, 2-13)
