= I'm Gonna Find a Cave =

Song by Jimmy Radcliffe and Buddy Scott

"I'm Gonna Find a Cave" is a song written in 1965 by Jimmy Radcliffe and Buddy Scott.

First recorded in 1966 by soul singer Charlie Starr on a United Artist Records single followed in the same year by an early psychobilly version by Billy Lee Riley on Crescendo Records Single.

Other versions of the song in this year were recorded in England where singer, songwriter, and record producer Miki Dallon released his Mod version on his own Strike Records. Dallon was so enthusiastic about the song over the course of the year he produced a version with the popular British freakbeat group The Sorrows and noted London R&B act Jimmy Powell And The Dimensions.

Uruguayan garage rock quintet Los Bulldogs recorded "I'm Gonna Find a Cave" with "Winchester Cathedral" in English on their 1966 RCA Victor Single (later also appeared in their second LP). However, it wasn't until 1968 when the Banana Splits recorded "I'm Gonna Find a Cave", featuring the lead vocal of singer Ricky Lancelotti, and four other Jimmy Radcliffe songs ("Adam Had'em", "The Show Must Go On", "Don't Go Away Go-Go Girl" and "Soul") for the television show The Banana Splits Adventure Hour that it became an early Saturday morning household tune. The song "Don't Go Away Go-Go Girl" was also recorded by indie pop band the Mr. T Experience.

In 1988, Tacoma punk band Girl Trouble recorded their version of the song, "Gonna Find a Cave", for the compilation album Sub Pop 200, released in the early days of the Seattle grunge scene.

In February 2011, a campaign to make "I'm Gonna Find a Cave" the international "Man Cave" anthem was started by Radcliffe's son. Retro rockers Spider 45, in a tribute to the recently deceased Bingo of the Banana Splits, released their version in October 2017.

== Selected discography ==
- Charlie Starr United Artist Single #50029, Produced by Garry Ganahan, Arranged by Herb Bernstein, 1966 (Video on YouTube)
- Billy Lee Riley Crescendo Single #371, 1966 (Video on YouTube)
- Miki Dallon Strike Single #306, (Spain) Picture Sleeve RCA Single #3-10163 1966 (Video on YouTube)
- Los Bulldogs (Uruguay) RCA Single, 1966 (Video on YouTube)
- Banana Splits We're the Banana Splits LP, Decca DL-75075, 1968 (Video on YouTube)
- Girl Trouble Sub Pop 200, 3 LP Sub Pop Records – #SP25 Boxed Set, 1988 (Video on YouTube) Girl Trouble Live on YouTube
- Jet Weston's Combo A Go-Go, Cavestomp Records, 2001 (Video on YouTube)

== Selected CD and digital release discography ==
- Jimmy Powell & the Dimensions "R&B Sensation" CD See For Miles Records, 1993
- The Sorrows "Take A Heart" CD Castle Records, 2000
- Jimmy Powell & the 5 Dimensions "Sugar Babe" CD Castle Records, 2003
- Miki Dallon "That's Alright" CD Castle Records, 2003
- Miki Dallon "Complete Works 1963–1966" CD One Media Publishing, 2007
- Jimmy Powell & the Dimensions "Progressive Talking Blues" Digital One Media Publishing, 2007
- The Sorrows "You Got What I Want The Essential Sorrows – 1965–67" CD Grapfuit Records, 2010

Compilations

- Sub Pop 200 (V.A. Comp) Re-Issue CD Sub Pop Records #SP25-2, (Girl Trouble – "Gonna Find a Cave"), 1995
- Little Steven's Garage Rock Invasion (V.A. Comp) CD Cavestomp Records (Jet Weston's Combo A Go-Go "Gonna Find a Cave"), 2001
- Doin’ The Mod Vol. 4 (V.A. Comp) CD Castle Records (The Sorrows – "Gonna Find a Cave"), 2002
- That Driving Beat Vol. 3 UK Freakbeats (V.A. Comp) CD Past & Present Records, (Miki Dallon – Gonna Find a Cave"), 2003
- Soul Masters – The Dancer (V.A Comp) Digital Corinco AG Records (Miki Dallon & The Medallions "Gonna Find a Cave), 2005
- Rare Mod Vol. 2 (V.A. Comp) (CD & Digital & Vinyl) Acid Jazz Records (C-Jam Blues "Gonna Find a Cave"), 2009
