= Solid Action =

Compilation album by The U-Men
- Released: 1999
- Genre: Punk rock; post-punk; garage rock; noise rock
- Label: Chuckie-Boy

The U-Men chronology
Step on a Bug (1988)	Solid Action (1999)

Professional ratings
Review scores
Source	Rating
AllMusic	4.5/5 stars

Solid Action is a compilation album released in 1999 by Seattle-based rock band The U-Men. It was released by the label Chuckie-Boy. The name of the album is taken from track 10 on Step on a Bug.

== Track listing ==
1. Gila - 2.18
2. Shoot 'Em Down - 4.05
3. Blight - 2.32
4. Flowers D.G.I.H. - 4.07
5. They - 3.30
6. Clubs - 4.20
7. 10 After 1 - 2.57
8. Cow Rock - 2.42
9. Green Trumpet - 3.49
10. Bad Little Woman - 2.32
11. Freezebomb - 2.23
12. That's Wild About Jack - 3.31
13. Dig It a Hole - 2.16
14. Solid Action - 2.08
15. 2 X 4 - 2.00
16. A Three Year Old Could Do That - 2.34
17. Papa Doesn't Love His Children Anymore - 3.30
18. Shoot 'Em Down (live) - 4.30
- Tracks 1–4 were originally on their first e.p. but "Gila" later appeared on Bruce Pavitt's Sub Pop 100 compilation and on a split with the Melvins for Sugar Daddy Live.
- Track 5 was originally from Deep Six compilation (C/Z Records, 1986).
- Tracks 6–9 were originally from Stop Spinning
- Track 10 was originally from Dope-Guns-'N-Fucking In The Streets, Vol. 1 compilation (Amphetamine Reptile, 1988).
- Tracks 13–17 are originally from Step On A Bug
- Track 18 was originally from the compilation Woodshock '85 (El Jefe Records, 1986).
