= Jimmy Radcliffe =

American singer (1936–1973)

- Radcliffe and the Signature Goya Guitar

Background information
- Also known as: Dutch
- Born: James Radcliffe; November 18, 1936; Harlem, New York City
- Died: July 27, 1973 (aged 36)
- Occupations: Musician, record producer, songwriter
- Instruments: Guitar, organ, keyboards, vocals, bass guitar, vibraphone, percussion
- Years active: 1959–73

James Radcliffe (November 18, 1936 – July 27, 1973) was an American soul singer, composer, arranger, conductor and record producer.

== Biography ==
James Radcliffe was born in New York City. He released such singles as "My Ship is Coming In", a song composed by his writing partner Joey Brooks (later of "You Light Up My Life" fame), was later covered by The Walker Brothers as a pop music hit, and also wrote several songs featured in the children's TV show The Banana Splits. His recording of "Long After Tonight Is All Over" (written by Burt Bacharach and Hal David) became famous as one of the songs that was played at the Wigan Casino all-nighters, the Northern soul venue. The song was a minor hit in the UK Singles Chart in 1965, reaching #40. The popularity of "Long After Tonight Is All Over" led to a promotional tour in support of the record, wherein Radcliffe was featured in the British music press (Record Mirror, NME) and appeared on numerous radio and televisions shows including "Ready, Steady, Go!" with The Rolling Stones’ "Time Is On My Side", The Kinks’ "Tired Of Waiting For You", The Righteous Brothers’ You've Lost That Lovin' Feelin', Del Shannon’s "Keep Searching" (January 15, 1965) and Thank Your Lucky Stars; the ABC Lucky Stars Special Presents Cilla Black with Cilla Black, The Riot Squad, The Hollies, The Swinging Blue Jeans, Del Shannon and Paul Anka (January 23, 1965); and The Eamonn Andrews Show.

Radcliffe did not live long enough to see this recording achieve cult status. He was overweight, had a kidney removed in 1973 and developed further complications with his remaining one. He died in hospital the same year on July 27, leaving his wife, Judy, and two sons.

== Career as vocalist ==
During his tenure as a New York City session vocalists, Radcliffe sang future hit songs like "This Diamond Ring" (Al Kooper, Bobby Brass, Irwin Levine) and "Pretty Flamingo" (Mark Barkan), and contributed to the session releases by The Definitive Rock Chorale's "Variations on a Theme Called Hanky Panky" produced by Ellie Greenwich and Mike Rashkow. Burt Bacharach and Hal David had him record songs for Gene Pitney, as would Ellie Greenwich and Tony Powers. Gloria Shayne enlisted his help to get Burl Ives and Arthur Prysock covers. Jerry Leiber and Mike Stoller, Scott English and Claus Ogerman were among his clients.

To supplement his income, he hired out as a backing vocalist, and recorded with Doris Troy, Dee Dee Warwick, Cissy Houston, Melba Moore, Toni Wine, Jean Thomas and Barbara Jean English doing sessions for groups such as The Drifters. Radcliffe, Dionne Warwick, and Dee Dee Warwick provided backing vocals on The Drifters' 1961 recording "Sweets for My Sweet".

Singer-songwriter Sherman Edwards recorded the original vocal demos of his songs for the planned musical 1776, but by late 1968 Edwards had also enlisted Jimmy Radcliffe ("Mama Look Sharp", "Is Anybody There"), Bernie Knee ("Mama Look Sharp", "Is Anybody There"), Ann Gilbert ("He Plays The Violin", "Yours, Yours, Yours") to record stylized demo versions that might also impact the pop charts. "1776" went on to become a 1969 Tony Award-winning Broadway show that inspired a 1972 feature film.

Another instance of Jimmy Radcliffe's involvement with Broadway bound musicals were his vocal demos of the Bob James and Jack O'Brien songs "Take My Hand" and "Stars Of Glory" for the 1972 theatrical production of The Selling of the President.

In August 1963, while preparing to work with the record producer, Bert Berns, on his third release on Musicor Records, Radcliffe attended a session at Chess Studios, produced by Berns, where three of his co-compositions were being recorded by Tammy Montgomery: "This Time Tomorrow", "I Can't Hold It In Any More" and "I've Got Nothing To Say But Goodbye". "This Time Tomorrow" would be issued as the B-side of Montgomery's Chess/Checker single, "If I Would Marry You." Radcliffe recorded with Montgomery a duet version of "If I Would Marry You," more than three years before her name change to Tammi Terrell and pairing with Marvin Gaye at Motown. The unreleased duet, and the other two unreleased songs from the sessions, were released on Come on And See Me, a double collection of Terrell's recordings.

One Bert Berns, Carl Spencer and Jimmy Radcliffe collaboration that did make the pop charts in 1963 was the song "My Block", recorded by The Chiffons. "She's Got Everything" recorded by The Essex, and produced by Henry Glover, as a follow-up to their million-seller "Easier Said Than Done" also charted at #56 and inspired recordings by singers Maxine Brown, Sugar Pie DeSanto and Barbara George.

== Career as composer and producer ==
In 1964, after a meeting with Martin Luther King Jr., in a Harlem supper club, Radcliffe was inspired and composed his ballad of freedom and equality "Stand Up". Unreleased at the time, until the 2008 issue Where There Smoke There's Fire, the track featured Radcliffe playing the vibes. Radcliffe was self-taught on the guitar, piano, bass, vibes and drums, preferring to write using his Goya acoustic guitar because of its portability.

Beginning in 1965, Radcliffe was the first African-American performing artist to write, produce and sing commercial jingles for the advertising industry. By the time of his death in 1973, he had worked on over two hundred television and radio commercials.

A few of Radcliffe's commercials are the 1969–70 Pontiac, "breakaway in a wide tracking Pontiac", the 30-second commercial was expanded for general release to try to capitalize on its popularity and was released as "Breakaway" by the Steve Karmen Big Band featuring Jimmy Radcliffe; the soul version of McDonald's "You Deserve A Break Today" (1971); and the Clio Award-winning "Polaroid Gives It To You Now" (1971).

Radcliffe's recordings have appeared in films such as 1967's Carmen Baby,What Do You Say to a Naked Lady? (1970), Tiki Tiki (1971) wherein he was backed by Cissy Houston on a gospel recording. "Eve's Bayou" (1997), The Tenants (2005), the 2006 romantic drama Something New, 2010's Soulboy and in 2025 his "Love Put The Tears In My Eyes" in two art heist films: The Mastermind and Any Day Now.

Jimmy's recording of "Climb Ev'ry Mountain" was showcased on the premiere episode of "Hard Knocks In Season - The Indianapolis Colts" on November 17, 2021.

Aretha Franklin's first credit as a record producer was with Radcliffe on "Black Pride" the theme to Jesse Jackson's (Southern Christian Leadership Conference) S.C.L.C. Black Expo '71.

== Writing credits ==
- The Andrews Sisters, "All The Colors of the Rainbow", Great Performers LP Dot Records-#25807, 1967
- Ray Charles, "Show Me The Sunshine", Love Country Style LP ABC-#707, 1970
- Robert Goulet, "If There's A Way", Columbia single #44100, 1967
- Johnny Mathis, "If There's A Way", Sings The Music of Bacharach & Kaempfert LP 1970 Columbia-#G-30350
- Aretha Franklin, "Pullin'", Spirit In The Dark LP Atlantic-#SD8265, 1970
- Carolyn Franklin, "Right On", Chain Reaction LP RCA Records-#LSP-4317, 1970
- Etta James, "I Can't Hold It in Anymore", Argo Single#5437 was the B-side to "Pushover", 1963
- Lou Rawls, "The Devil in Your Eyes", "Something Stirring In My Soul", Carryin' On LP Capitol Records-#ST2632, 1966
- Eric Burdon & The Animals, "It's Been A Long Time Comin'", Eric Is Here LP 1967 MGM
- Clyde McPhatter, "Deep In The Heart Of Harlem", "Three Rooms With Running Water", "My Block", "A Suburban Town", Coney Island Mercury LP-#20902 & SR-60902, 1964
- Jackie Wilson, "Soulville" Higher And Higher LP Brunswick Records-#BL754130, 1967 "The Fairest Of Them All" Brunswick single#55300, 1966
- Matt Monro, "Fourth Blue Monday", Capitol single #P-2058, 1967
- The Chiffons, "My Block", #67 (as The Four Pennies) on Rust Single #5071, 1963
- Patti Page, "Pretty Boy Lonely", #98 Columbia single #4-42671, 1963
- Marlena Shaw, "Nothing But Tears", Out of a Different Bag LP Cadet Records-#LPS-803, 1967
- Clara Ward, "If You Wanna Change The World", "Soul And Inspiration" LP Capitol #ST-126 Prod. David Axelrod, Arr. & Cond. H.B. Barnum, 1969
- The Clovers, "Sweet Side of a Soulful Woman" Josie Single#997, 1968
- Connie Francis, "Saturday Night Knight"
- Esther Phillips, "Try Me", Atlantic single#2570, 1966
- Jimmy Witherspoon, "Never Knew This Kind of Hurt Before", HUHN! LP 1970 Bluesway Records-#BLS-6040
- Johnny Maestro, {"Never Knew This Kind of Hurt Before", Buddah single #201, 1970
- Nancy Wilson, "I'm Your Special Fool", Nancy LP Capitol Records-#ST-148, 1969
- The Essex, "She's Got Everything", #58 Roulett single#4530 1963
- Bert Kaempfert & His Orchestra, "But Not Today", A Man Could Get Killed, Decca DL-74750 (1966) and Strangers in the Night, Decca DL-74795 (1966)
- Chet Baker, "But Not Today", Mariachi Brass – Double Shout World Pacific-#1852, 1967
- Johnny Nash, "How Do I Say I Love You", Studio Time LP ABC Records-#ABCS-383, 1961
- Tammy Montgomery (later Tammi Terrell), "This Time Tomorrow" Checker single#1072, 1964
- The Hourglass (aka The Allman Bros), "Nothing But Tears", The Hour Glass LP Liberty Records-#56002, 1967
- The Banana Splits, "Adam Had'em", "I'm Gonna Find a Cave" "Don' Go Away Go-Go Girl" "The Show Must Go On", "Soul", We're The Banana Splits LP Decca DL-75075, 1968
- The Harlem Globetrotters (cartoon television series)
- The Fourmost, "My Block", First And Foremost LP Parlophone PMC 1259, Produced by George Martin, 1965
- Tom Jones, "It's Been A Long Time Comin'", A-Tom-Ic Jones LP Decca Records-#SKL-4743, 1966
- Helen Shapiro, "Forget About The Bad Things", Columbia single#DB7810, 1966
- Cliff Bennett & The Rebel Rousers, "Three Rooms With Running Water", Parolophone single#R5259 (UK) Amy single#930 (US), 1965
- Gene Pitney, "Lyda Sue, Wha'dya Do", Meets The Fair Ladies of Folkland LP Musicor-#MM2007, 1964
- Billy Lee Riley, "I'm Gonna Find A Cave", Crescendo single#371, 1966
- Bobby Lewis, "Intermission", Beltone single#B2035, 1963
- Adam Wade, "It's Been A Long Time Comin'" Epic single#5-9771, 1965 and "A Man Alone" Epic single#5-10112,
- Gloria Lynne, "Speaking of Happiness", "Love Child" and "Livin' The Life of Love"
- Lou Monte, "All for the Kids", RCA single#47-9405, 1967
- Vaughn Meader, "The Elephant Song", MGM single#K-13169, 1963
- Arthur Prysock, "Don't You Ever Feel Sorry", In A Mood LP 1966 Old Town Records-#2010
- P. J. Proby, "I Love Therefore I Am", Liberty Records EP-#LEP2229, 1965
- Julie London, "Treat Me Good", With Body And Soul LP 1967 Liberty Records-#3514
- Garnet Mimms & The Enchanters, "The Truth Hurts (But Not As Much as You Lies)", Cry Baby And 11 Other Hits LP United Artists-#UAL3305, 1963 and Veep single #1252, 1967
- Miki Dallon, "I'm Gonna Find A Cave", Strike single#306 (Spain) Picture Sleeve RCA single#3-10163, 1966
- The Sorrows, "I'm Gonna Find A Cave", Take A Heart CD, 2000
- Gina Sicilia "Try Me", Allow Me To Confess CD Swing Nation, 2007
- Girl Trouble, "Gonna Find A Cave", Sub Pop 200, 1988
- Mr. T Experience, "Don't Go Away Go-Go Girl", Big Black Bugs Bleed Blue Blood CD
- Kristina Train, "If You Want Me", Split Milk CD 2009 Blue Note
- Rattlin Bone "Speaking Of Happiness" (2010)

Radcliffe's songs have appeared in films and television dating back to 1965's The Fool Killer, A Man Could Get Killed, which featured "Strangers in the Night" and "But Not Today" as the main themes, The Banana Splits Adventure Hour (1968–70), The Harlem Globetrotters (1970–72), Se7en (1995), U Turn (1997), La Bande Du Drugstore (2002) featuring "Try Me", Third Watch (1999–2005), Sleeper Cell (2005–06), Lion (2016), and "The Man In The High Castle".

As a record producer Radcliffe produced the original demo of the song "It's My Party". While acting as A&R director of Musicor Records he signed The Intruders who released the single "But You Belong To Me" b/w "Jack Be Nimble" and pop group The Critters, producing the latter's first release "Georgianna" b/w "I'm Gonna Give" in 1964 before they moved over to Kapp Records. Also in 1964, Radcliffe produced a record for the soul group The Relatives that featured the song "Hadn't Been For Baby", which he co-wrote with Billy Edd Wheeler. Radcliffe was also label-mate Gene Pitney's recording manager. Having met years earlier, before either had signed to Aaron Schroeder's publishing company, Radcliffe helped manage which songs Pitney would record, and directed his recording sessions.

Radcliffe co-produced, with John Hammond, Pat Lundy's album Soul Aint Nothin' But The Blues (1967) on Columbia Records and much of the material used on Carolyn Franklin, first three albums for RCA Records. Radcliffe and Aretha Franklin co-produced the theme "Black Pride", for the Jesse Jackson organized S.C.L.C. Black Expo in New York City in 1971.

== Discography ==
=== Contemporary releases ===
Musicor Records

- "Twist Calypso" (Phil Stern, Jimmy Radcliffe) / "Don't Look My Way" (Phil Stern, Jimmy Radcliffe) Single# MU-1016, Produced by Aaron Schroeder and Wally Gold, 1962
- "(There Goes) The Forgotten Man" (Hal David, Burt Bacharach) / "An Awful Lot of Cryin'" (Buddy Kaye, Phil Springer) Single# MU1024, Side 'A' Produced by Aaron Schroeder and Wally Gold, arranged & conducted by Burt Bacharach, Side 'B' Produced by Bert Berns. 1962
- "Through a Long and Sleepless Night" (Mack Gordan, Alfred Newman) / "Moment of Weakness" (Oramay Diamond, Jimmy Radcliffe) Single# MU-1033, Produced by Bert Berns. 1963
- "Long After Tonight Is All Over" (Hal David, Burt Bacharach) / "What I Want I Can Never Have" (Gloria Shayne) Single# MU1042, Produced by Bert Berns. Charted #40 UK Singles Chart (Issued on Stateside Records #374)

Aurora Records

- "My Ship Is Comin' In" (Joey Brooks) / "Goin' Where The Lovin' Is" (Joey Brooks, Aaron Schroeder) Single# 154, Produced by Joey Brooks for Past, Present & Future Productions. 1965

Shout Records

- "Lucky Old Sun" (Haven Gillespie, Beasley Smith) / "So Deep" (Bob Brass, Joey Brooks) Single#202, Produced by Buddy Scott, Jimmy Radcliffe and Wally Gold for Past, Present & Future Productions. Arranged & conducted by Bert Decoteaux. 1966

United Artists The Steve Karmen Big Band featuring Jimmy Radcliffe

- "Breakaway" (Steve Karmen) / "Breakaway" Part 2 (Steve Karmen) Single# 50451 Produced & arranged by Steve Karmen. 1968

RCA Records

- "Funky Bottom Congregation" (Thommy Kaye) / "Lay A Little Lovin' On Me" (Buddy Scott, Jimmy Radcliffe) Single# 74-0138, Produced, arranged and conducted by Jimmy Radcliffe for Super Baby Cakes Productions. 1969

=== Discography of uncredited releases ===
Tollie Records

- The B.R.A.T.T.S. (The Brotherhood for the R-establishment of American Top Ten Supremacy)

"Secret Weapon (The British Are Coming)" (Arthur Korb) / "Jealous Kind of Woman" (Carl Spencer) Single#9024, Produced by Wally Gold for Past, Present And Future Productions, Arranged & conducted by Bob Halley. Vocals: Carl Spencer & Jimmy Radcliffe 1964

Musicor Records

- Joey Brooks

"Cry, Cry, Cry" (Joey Brooks, Jimmy Radcliffe) / "A Girl Wants To Believe" (Joey Brooks, Jimmy Radcliffe) Single #MU1037, Produced by Brooks/Radcliffe, arranged & conducted by Garry Sherman. Lead Vocals: Joey Brooks, Backing Vocals: Jimmy Radcliffe. 1964

Fontana Records (UK)

- The Mixture

"One By One" (Joey Brooks, Jimmy Radcliffe) / "Monkey Jazz" (Joey Brooks, Jimmy Radcliffe) Single#TF-640, Produced and arranged by Jimmy Radcliffe & Joey Brooks for Past, Present and Future Productions. Lead Vocals & Scat by Jimmy Radcliffe, Backing Vocals by Joey Brooks 1965

Decca Records (UK)

- Joey Brooks And The Baroque Folk

"I Ain't Blaming You" (Joey Brooks, Al Stillman) / "Nobody Waved Goodbye" on YouTube (Joey Brooks, Wally Gold, Aaron Schroeder) Single # F12328, Produced and arranged by Joey Brooks, Lead Vocal: Joey Brooks, Backing Vocal & Acoustic Guitar: Jimmy Radcliffe. January 1966.

Rust Records

- Carl Spencer

"Cover Girl" (Carl Spencer, Al Cleveland) / "Progress" (Bob Halley, Carl Spencer) Single#5104, Produced and arranged by Bob Halley for Alice in Wonderland Productions. Side 'B' = Lead Vocal: Carl Spencer, Backing Vocal: Jimmy Radcliffe. 1966

Parrot Records

- The Daily News

"I'm In The Mood" (S. Barnes, J.J. Jackson) / "The Groove" (Holt, Holt, Ealey, Paris) Single#327, Produced by Ellie Greenwich and Mike Rashkow for Pineywood Productions Inc., Horns arranged by Meco Monardo. Side 'A'= Lead Vocal: Frankie Paris, Counter Lead Vocal: Jimmy Radcliffe. 1968

Philips Records

- The Definitive Rock Chorale

"Variations On A Theme Called Hanky Panky" (Ellie Greenwich, Jeff Barry) / "Picture Postcard World" (Paul Levinson) Single#40529, Produced by Mike Rashkow and Ellie Greenwich for Pineywood Productions Inc. Side 'A' arranged by Sammy Lowe, Side 'B' arranged By Paul Lewshen. Lead & Backing Vocals: Johnny Cymbal, Michael Rashkow Ellie Greenwich, Ron Dante, Toni Wine, Lesley Miller, Billy Carr, Tommy West (Picardo), Terry Cashman, Gene Pistilli, Jimmy Radcliffe. 1968

Kirshner Records

- The Globetrotters

"Duke of Earl" (Gene Chandler, Earl Edwards, Bernice Williams) / "Everybody's Got Hot Pants (Neil Sedaka, Howard Greenfield) Single#63-5012, Produced by Jimmy Radcliffe & Wally Gold, arranged By Jimmy Radcliffe. Lead & Backing Vocals: Jimmy Radcliffe. Music Supervisor: Don Kirshner 1971

"Everybody Needs Love" (Phil Stern, Jimmy Radcliffe) / "ESP" (Neil Sedaka, Howard Greenfield) Single#63-5016, Side 'A' Produced by Jimmy Radcliffe & Wally Gold, arranged by Jimmy Radcliffe. Lead & Backing Vocal: Jimmy Radcliffe. Side 'B' Produced by Jeff Barry (Unknown Non-Radcliffe Vocal). Music Supervisor: Don Kirshner 1971

== Bibliography ==
- Pruter, Robert, editor (1993). Blackwell Guide to Soul Recordings. Oxford: Basil Blackwell Ltd. ISBN 0-631-18595-X
- Roberts, Kev (2000). The Northern Soul Top 500. Goldmine / Soul Supply Limited. ISBN 0-9539291-0-8.
- Winstanley, Russ; Nowell, David (1996). Soul Survivors: The Wigan Casino Story. Robson Books. ISBN 1-86105-126-3.
- Nowell, David (2001). Too Darn Soulful: The Story of Northern Soul. Robson Books. ISBN 1-86105-431-9.

== Other sources ==
- There's That Beat Magazine, Issue # 8, July 2008
- Billboard Magazine: March 24, 1962
- Billboard, September 22, 1962, (There Goes) The Forgotten Man – Review
- Billboard, August 3, 1963
- Billboard, November 28, 1964 (Long After Tonight Is All Over)
- Billboard, January 16, 1965 (Gene Pitney's Recording Manager)
- Billboard, July 31, 1965 ("My Ship Is Comin'" In Review)
- Billboard, September 2, 1967 "Liscris Productions"
- Billboard, October 21, 1967 ("Soul Ain't Nothing But The Blues" Single Review)
- Jet Magazine, February 11, 1971 (Performing at Kimako Baraka's Club CASBAH)
- Billboard, May 8, 1971 (Globetrotters "Duke Of EarL")
- Billboard, June 30, 1973 (Working With Carolyn Franklin)
