= U-Men (EP) =

EP by The U-Men
- Released: 1984
- Genre: Punk rock; post-punk; garage rock; noise rock
- Length: 13:04
- Label: Big Bad Music, Bomb Shelter

The U-Men chronology
U-Men (1984)	Stop Spinning (EP) (1985)

U-Men is the first EP by the band The U-Men released in 1984.

The song "Gila" appears on Sub Pop 100, as well as a split with the Melvins for Sugar Daddy Live. It was recorded by John Nelson at Crow Studio in Seattle.

== Track listing ==
1. "Blight" – 2:33
2. "Flowers D.G.I.H." – 4:17
3. "Shoot 'Em Down" – 4:00
4. "Gila" – 2:18
