= Give the People What We Want: Songs of The Kinks =

Give The People What We Want: Songs of The Kinks

Compilation album by Sub Pop Records
- Released: 2001
- Recorded: 2001
- Genre: Rock
- Label: Sub Pop

Sub Pop Records chronology
Hype! (1996)	Give The People What We Want: Songs of The Kinks (2001)	Sub Pop 1000 (2013)

Give The People What We Want: Songs of The Kinks is a 2001 tribute album to music of the Kinks by various garage, punk and indie artists from the Northwestern United States.

As described by one reviewer, the compilation is a "truly weird amalgamation that eviscerates the competition by providing you with what you never even thought about wanting. For instance: a quiet, heartfelt rendition of 'Waterloo Sunset', as performed by the Fastbacks. It's the most charmlessly charming, utterly superfluous album I've heard in a while; where most tribute albums suffer from a hyper-obsession while remaining true to the original artist, this compilation makes a strong case for the offbeat."

== Track listing ==
1. "Revenge" – C Average 2:55
2. "Gotta Get the First Plane Home" – Young Fresh Fellows 2:03
3. "Nothin' in the World Can Stop Me from Worryin' About That Girl" – Mark Lanegan 4:12
4. "Who Will Be the Next in Line" – Mudhoney 2:10
5. "Ring the Bells" – Model Rockets 2:25
6. "This Man He Weeps Tonight" – Fall Outs 2:20
7. "The Way Love Used to Be" – Heather Duby 2:40
8. "Sunny Afternoon" – Baby Gramps 5:00
9. "Alcohol" – Murder City Devils 3:25
10. "Session Man" – Congratulators 3:06
11. "Tin Soldier Man" – Love As Laughter 3:46
12. "Waterloo Sunset" – Fastbacks 3:23
13. "Fancy" – Jon Auer 3:04
14. "Brainwashed" – Pinkos 2:18
15. "Act Nice and Gentle" – Larry Barrett 2:55
16. "Wicked Annabella" – The Minus 5 2:25
17. "Strangers" – Makers 3:49
18. "Come Dancing" – Briefs 2:25
19. "I Go to Sleep" – Nikol Kollars 3:53
