= Sub Pop 1000 =

Compilation album by Sub Pop Records
- Released: April 20, 2013
- Genre: Alternative rock
- Length: 39:06
- Label: Sub Pop

Sub Pop Records chronology
Give the People What We Want: Songs of The Kinks (2001)	Sub Pop 1000 (2013)

Sub Pop 1000 is a compilation album released by Sub Pop. The album was limited, one-time release of 5,000 colored 12-inch vinyl records with cover art by Nathan Fox and will also include a 16-page booklet and MP3 download coupon. The record's release date coincides with Record Store Day on April 20, 2013, but is not a Record Store Day exclusive. The title references the 1986 compilation Sub Pop 100 and features previously unreleased songs by up-and-coming artists on the Sub Pop label.

== Track listing ==
No.	Title	Artist	Length
1.	"Kidult"	His Electro Blue Voice	6:59
2.	"Lacandona"	Chancha Via Circuito	2:22
3.	"French Poet"	Protomartyr	4:56
4.	"Tangled North"	Lori Goldston	3:39
5.	"A Victory for Polio"	Iron Lung	1:25
6.	"Money"	Soldiers of Fortune	4:21
7.	"Subterranean Brainblow"	Peaking Lights	4:19
8.	"Radio Eyes"	Ed Schrader's Music Beat	2:04
9.	"Guided"	My Disco	4:00
10.	"Doomed"	Starred	5:01

== See also ==
- Sub Pop 100
- Sub Pop 200
