= Purplemetalflakemusic =

Studio album by the Fluid
- Released: 1993
- Genres: Alternative rock, grunge
- Label: Hollywood
- Producers: Mike Bosley, the Fluid

The Fluid chronology
| Glue EP (1990) | Purplemetalflakemusic (1993) |

Singles from Purplemetalflakemusic
- 1. "7/14" Released: April 26, 1993

Purplemetalflakemusic is the fourth and final album by the American band the Fluid, released in 1993. It was the band's first album for a major label. The Fluid named the album after their music publishing company. The band supported the album by touring with Love Battery. The first single was "Mister Blameshifter".

Due to poor sales and the exit of their drummer, the band broke up less than a year after the album's release.

== Production ==
The album was produced by Mike Bosley and the band. The Fluid spent more than four weeks and $125,000 on the recording.

The band, rather infamously, declined to work with Tony Visconti.

== Critical reception ==
Professional ratings
Review scores
| Source | Rating |
|---|---|
| AllMusic | 4.5/5 stars |
| MusicHound Rock: The Essential Album Guide | 3/5 stars |

The Colorado Springs Gazette-Telegraph stated: "For the uninitiated, the Fluid fits well with the new buzzword, 'grunge,' but the group was playing turbo-charged garage rock years before Nirvana was a gleam in anyone's bank account." The Los Angeles Times opined that "the main problem is that the Fluid has no truly great songs ... The music is marginally exciting because of its basic catchy structure." The Arizona Daily Star deemed the album's sound "not unlike that of a Harley Davidson's righteous roar, a headlong cross between the Stooges, late '70s punk and timeless, numb head banging."

The Austin American-Statesman determined that the album "still sounds like the work of a punk tribute band, but such obvious reference points as the Stooges, the New York Dolls, the Dictators and the Fleshtones seem fresh as ever when the songs and spirit are as strong as the best stuff here." The Washington Post concluded that "there's nothing novel about either the words or the music on Purpleetc., but the Fluid's sheer garage-band determination makes these chugging, tuneful rockers sound surprisingly fresh."

AllMusic wrote that, "unlike a large part of the original Sub Pop scene, who borrowed heavily from '70s heavy metal and punk ... The Fluid embraced a full-throttle MC5 approach with the dual guitar attack of Richard Kulwicki and James Clower." Rolling Stone placed the album at No. 38 on its list of the "50 Greatest Grunge Albums", writing that "'She Don’t Understand' has a hummable, power-pop vocal line that’s paired with the sort of direct guitar riff Kurt Cobain would have killed for."

== Track listing ==
| No. | Title | Length |
|---|---|---|
| 1. | "My Kind" |
| 2. | "One Eye Out" |
| 3. | "She Don't Understand" |
| 4. | "7/14" |
| 5. | "Pill" |
| 6. | "Wasn't My Idea" |
| 7. | "On My Feet" |
| 8. | "Lies" |
| 9. | "Mister Blameshifter" |
| 10. | "Said That I'm Through" |
| 11. | "Change" |
| 12. | "Hand in Hand" |
