= Cat Butt =

American rock band

- Origin: Seattle, Washington
- Genres: Alternative rock, grunge
- Years active: 1987–1990
- Past members: Danny Bland, James Burdyshaw, David Emanual Duet, Dean Gunderson, John Michael, Tom Price, Charlie Ryan, Erik Peterson

Cat Butt was a Seattle, Washington rock group, formed in 1987. Initially, the band did a short West Coast tour, and then went on to record their first full-length album, Journey to the Center Of, which was produced by Jack Endino of Skin Yard. To promote the album, the band did a large U.S. tour, before disbanding in late 1990. Although not as successful as other Sub Pop bands, they maintained a loyal cult following in the Pacific Northwest.

The band is referenced in the first verse of the Guided by Voices song "Pendulum", from their 1990 album Same Place the Fly Got Smashed: "Come on over tonight; we'll put on some Cat Butt and do it up right."

== Members ==
- Danny Bland – rhythm guitar
- James Burdyshaw – guitar (formerly of 64 Spiders)
- David Emanual Duet – vocals (formerly of Girl Trouble)
- Dean Gunderson – bass
- John Michael "Amerika" – rhythm guitar
- Tom Price – rhythm guitar (formerly of The U-Men)
- Charlie Ryan – Drums (formerly of The U-Men)
- Erik "Erok" Peterson – drums

== Personnel changes ==
=== Cat Butt #1 ===
The first six months of 1987: "Big Cigar" (Sub Pop 200)

- David Emmanuel Duet – vocals
- James Burdyshaw – lead guitar
- John Michael Amerika – rhythm guitar
- Tom "Manny Eldorado" Price – bass
- Charlie "Circus" Ryan – drums

=== Cat Butt #2 ===
Late 1987–Summer 1988: "64 Funny Cars" b/w "Hell's Half Acre"

- David Emmanuel Duet – vocals
- James Burdyshaw – lead guitar
- John Michael "Amerika" – rhythm guitar
- Dean Gunderson – bass
- Erik "Erok" Peterson – drums

=== Cat Butt #3 ===
Summer 1988–1990: Journey to the Center Of

- David Emmanuel Duet – vocals
- James Burdyshaw — lead guitar
- Danny Bland – rhythm guitar
- Dean Gunderson – bass
- Erik "Erok" Peterson – drums

== After Cat Butt ==
Price continued to work with The U-Men. He then left to form The Kings of Rock, and formed Gas Huffer in 1989. Ryan remained with the U-Men. Bland joined The Dwarves, and then joined the Best Kissers in the World with Mark Wooten of Zipgun. He was later replaced by Paul Schurr of Flop, and is now the manager for the Supersuckers. Peterson went on to play with John the Baptist until 1993, and then joined The Purdins, which disbanded in early 2000. Duet formed Bottle of Smoke, with Ryan and Price in the lineup, which disbanded around 2004. Gunderson joined guitarist Tim Kerr in Austin to form Jack O' Fire, which disbanded in 1996. Duet and Gunderson live in Los Angeles and formed the band Hot for Chocolate in 2006. Burdyshaw went on to form the bands Yummy Fur, The Sinister Six, and his current band, The Bug Nasties.

== Discography ==
=== Albums ===
- Journey to the Center Of (1989, Sub Pop)

=== Singles ===
- "64 Funny Cars" b/w "Hell's Half Acre" (1988, Penultimate)

=== Compilations ===
- Sub Pop 200 (1988, Sub Pop) – song: "Big Cigar"
