= Dark Black =

Studio album by Kristina Train
- Released: November 5, 2012
- Genre: Pop; rhythm and blues; soul
- Length: 42:06
- Label: Mercury
- Producer: Martin Craft, Ed Harcourt, Justin Parker, Dave Kosten

Kristina Train chronology
Spilt Milk (2009)	Dark Black (2012)	Rayon City (2021)

Singles from Dark Black
- 1. "Dream of Me" Released: August 27, 2012; 2. "Lose You Tonight" Released: February 4, 2013

Dark Black is the second album by Kristina Train, released on November 5, 2012 in the UK.

== Development ==
Since her last album, Train was signed by Mercury Records, switched to dark sultry pop instead of jazz, and started working with Martin Craft, Ed Harcourt, and Simon Aldred. After releasing Spilt Milk, EMI, the parent company of her label Blue Note, imploded, axing promotion staff so that Train's album was not well promoted and Blue Note dropped her. However, one musician who heard her work and was impressed was Herbie Hancock. He was looking for a vocalist to join with his band as he was touring to support River: The Joni Letters. Train joined him and toured for two years as a vocalist and violin player. This gave Train an opportunity to gain a broader musical education, and by the time she went to record Dark Black Train knew what she wanted to record, or as she said "after two years on the road with Herbie Hancock, I had a very, very clear vision of what I wanted to do musically." Many of the songs on the album are personal, telling tales of heartbreak and loss, although some sunny songs such as "I Wanna Live in LA" crept into the mix.

Two singles have been released from Dark Black; "Dream of Me" and "Lose You Tonight".

== Track listing ==
No.	Title	Writer(s)	Length
1.	"Dark Black"	Kristina Train, Martin Craft	3:04
2.	"Dream of Me"	K. Train, M. Craft	3:35
3.	"Pins & Needles"	K. Train, M. Craft	3:17
4.	"No One's Gonna Love You"	Ben Bridwell, Rob Hampton, Creighton Barrett	3:31
5.	"Lonely Sinner"	K. Train, Ed Harcourt	4:10
6.	"Saturdays Are the Greatest"	K. Train, M. Craft	3:18
7.	"Don't Leave Me Here Alone"	K. Train, Simon Aldred	3:31
8.	"I Wanna Live in LA"	K. Train, M. Craft	3:54
9.	"Stick Together"	K. Train, M. Craft	3:43
10.	"Lose You Tonight"	K. Train, M. Craft, Justin Parker	3:33
11.	"Everloving Arms"	K. Train, S. Aldred	3:34
12.	"January"	K. Train, E. Harcourt	2:56
Total length:			42:06

== Reception ==
Although well reviewed by British reviewers, Dark Black initially struggled to find its audience base, with Mercury dropping four months after the album release. However, one influential fan, Bruce Springsteen, gave her album a shout-out on a couple of interviews which helped raise the profile of the album. Springsteen compared her to Dusty Springfield. Springsteen even gave her a text on her birthday, and mentioned that her album was one of the albums on his permanent playlist at the time.
