= Kristina Train =

American singer-songwriter and musician (born 1982)

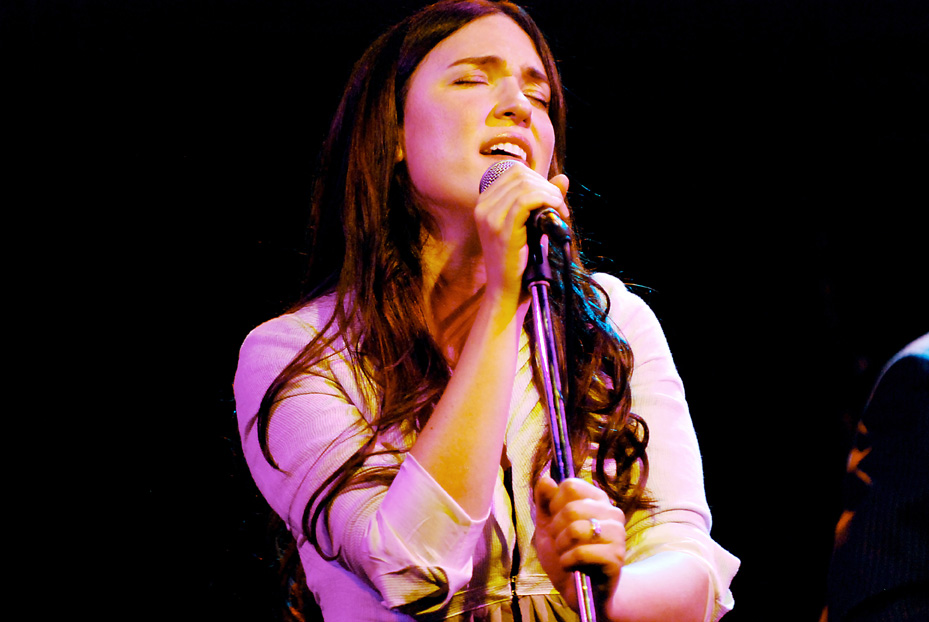

Background information
- Born: January 17, 1982 (age 44); New York City, USA
- Origin: Savannah, Georgia, USA
- Genres: Roots music, Americana
- Instrument: Violin
- Years active: 2001–present
- Labels: Blue Note Records, EMI (2009); Mercury Records (UK) (2011–2013)
- Website: kristinatrain.com

Kristina Train (born January 17, 1982, in New York City as Kristina Beaty) is an American singer-songwriter and musician who lives in Nashville, having previously lived in London, United Kingdom. Her music blends influences from country, soul, gospel, blues, folk, and jazz.

== Early life ==
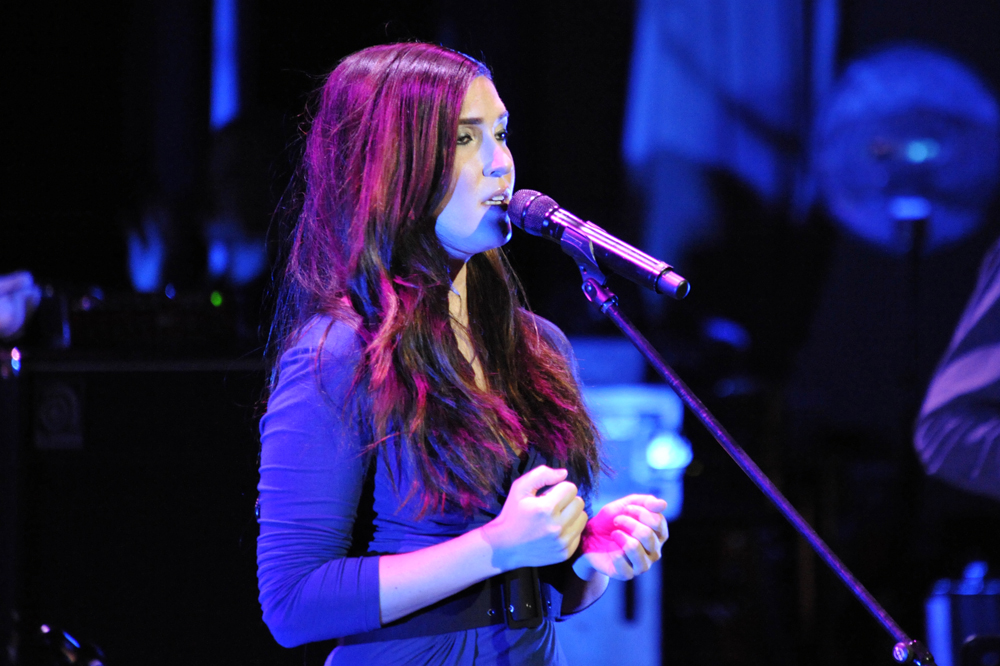
Performing in Warsaw, Poland, in November 2010 with Herbie Hancock

Kristina was born in New York City's Greenwich Village and raised in Savannah, Georgia, where she and her mother moved from New Jersey when she was 10 years old. She is of Norwegian, Italian, and Irish heritage. At the age of four, Kristina started studying classical violin, learning the Suzuki Method at Princeton University. She sang in church and school choirs. She often returned to New Jersey in the summers of middle school and high school, singing and playing violin weekly in Belmar with the band Stringbean and the Stalkers. In 1999, she joined the soul outfit The Looters, often backing vocalist and saxaphonist Rosa King on tour. In 2001 she joined the Park Bench Blues Band while living in Athens, Georgia often touring with Bloodkin, Redbelly, and other Georgia-based bands.

In 2001 Train played a showcase in New York City for Blue Note Records. Executives Bruce Lundvall and Arif Mardin subsequently invited Train to sign to Blue Note. She was the last artist signed by Mardin before his death. Train left school to pursue music full-time, moving to New York and signing with Blue Note.

== Career ==
=== 2009: Spilt Milk ===
Train's debut album, Spilt Milk, was released on October 20, 2009. Blue Note had initially been interested in pairing her with Norah Jones producer Lee Alexander, but Train instead went to London and asked Jimmy Hogarth to produce the album. Train co-wrote eight songs on the album, collaborating with Hogarth, Eg White, and Ed Harcourt. Train also arranged and overdubbed strings on three tracks. NPR Music wrote: "Kristina Train possesses a singing voice from another era... Her sound recalls Dusty Springfield, Aretha Franklin, and Laura Nyro… she lives up to the legacy of the great voices that inspired her."

=== 2012: Dark Black ===
On October 26, 2012, Train's album Dark Black was released for online purchases in the UK, and on November 5, 2012, the CD was released in the UK by Mercury Records. The album, where she collaborated mainly with Ed Harcourt, Cherry Ghost's Simon Aldred, and Martin Craft, was described by the BBC as "an extraordinary record from a singer previously overlooked." Huffington Post wrote: "If you aren't in love with Train's voice by the end... there is something seriously wrong with your ears".

=== 2021: Rayon City ===
Train announced via social media she was working on her third album, Rayon City. She also posted two photos, including a black & white one of an exhibition-room marked "Rayon and Synthetic Yarns". Producer and composer Skylar Wilson is among those who worked on the album. Ian Fitchuk is credited with playing drums, percussion, and piano. Rayon City is the last recording made by Kofi Burbridge who is featured on synth, keys, and flute. The album Rayon City was released digitally on July 20, 2021.

=== 2022: Body Pressure ===
Train announced via social media she had released her fourth album, Body Pressure on October 31, 2022. Inspired by a 1974 Bruce Nauman performance piece of the same title, the album reunited Train with former band-mate Lionel Loueke, and introduced Carlos Homs taking up synth responsibilities for Kofi Burbridge.

=== 2025: County Line ===
County Line was recorded at Dave's Room in Los Angeles. It features musicians Matt Chamberlain, Denny Fongheiser, Paul Bushnell, Zach Ross, Sasha Smith, and Marty Rifkin. Collaborators include Ed Harcourt, Kim Richey, Jimmy Hogarth, Mike Mattison, and Paul Olsen.

== Bruce Springsteen ==
In an NPR interview (Jan 15, 2014) while speaking with Ann Powers about music he was listening to, Springsteen singled out Kristina Train, saying: "Kristina Train: very Dusty Springfield. There’s a song called 'Dark Black' that’s fantastic. I love that."

On his From My Home to Yours radio show (Vol. 20, March 31, 2021), Bruce Springsteen spotlighted Kristina Train’s song “Saturdays Are the Greatest” and praised her album Dark Black. He called Train’s voice “incredible,” described Dark Black as one of his favorite records of the past decade, and emphasized that while it had been overlooked in the U.S., it deserved a far larger audience. He urged listeners to add it to their collections, promising they “would not regret” discovering it.

== Other projects ==
Train often plays with the band Scrapomatic and contributed vocals, violin, and songwriting on their 2006 album Alligator Love Cry, under the name of Kristina Beaty.

She is a vocalist in John Mailander's Forecast, touring in the band and featured on their 2021 album "Look Closer".

On October 10, 2007, Train performed at Carnegie Hall honoring Sir Elton John and Bernie Taupin for New York's Music for Youth.

In 2009, Train toured the United States with Chris Isaak, Susan Tedeschi, and Keb' Mo.

Train performed at the T.J Martell Foundation 34th Annual Awards Gala alongside Willie Nelson, Dianne Reeves, and Wynton Marsalis on October 28, 2009.

In 2009 and 2010 Train performed with Al Green, Tony Bennett, The Roots, and Darius Rucker.

Train contributed vocals to Marc Cohn's 2010 album Listening Booth, and contributed vocals and fiddle on Collin Rocker's 2010 debut album Milkbox Love, Jukebox Blood, & Other American Favorites.

Train toured the world with Herbie Hancock as his lead singer and violinist for nearly two years, with appearances on American television programs: The Tonight Show With Jay Leno, Late Show With David Letterman, Late Night With Jimmy Fallon, Larry King Live, Today, and Good Morning America. The band included musicians Lionel Loueke, Vinnie Colaiuta, James Genus, Pino Palladino, Tal Wilkenfeld, Greg Phillinganes, and Trevor Lawrence Jr.

Train performed at the bi-coastal 70th birthday celebration for Herbie Hancock which took place at New York's Carnegie Hall and Los Angeles' Hollywood Bowl alongside Wayne Shorter, Ron Carter, Jack DeJohnette, Dave Holland, Joe Lovano, Terence Blanchard, Wallace Roney, Zakir Hussain, Esperanza Spalding, Derek Trucks, Susan Tedeschi, Lisa Hannigan, Alex Acuña, Paulinho Da Costa, Juanes, Niladri Kumar, Bill Cosby, and Tavis Smiley.

Train co-wrote the closing track Salvation on Robert Randolph and the Family Band's album We Walk This Road which was produced by T-Bone Burnett.

On December 11, 2010, Train performed with Herbie Hancock, India.Arie, Florence and the Machine, Robyn, Colbie Caillat, and Barry Manilow at the Nobel Peace Prize Concert hosted by Denzel Washington and Anne Hathaway in Oslo, Norway.

In June 2011 Train collaborated with Dr. Dre in studio sessions for his eventually scrapped album, Detox.

On October 30, 2012, Train made her debut performance on Later... with Jools Holland on BBC 2.

The song "Dark Black" by Kristina Train is featured in the 2012 German film Die Vermessung der Welt (known in English as Measuring the World). This is a historical drama based on the 2006 novel of the same name by Daniel Kehlmann.

Train was featured on the soundtrack of the 2013 British comedy I Give It a Year covering the Coldplay song, "Sparks".

On January 30, 2013, Train was the first artist to sing live at the grand opening of The Shard.

On March 7, 2013, Train made her debut performance at London's Royal Albert Hall with Ron Sexsmith.

Train is the voice of the Lexus Amazing in Motion 2013 global campaign, singing the song I'm Wandering previously released by Jackie Wilson (1958) and Aretha Franklin (1962).

Train sings Waltz with Me Under the Sun, the theme song of the 2013 film Queen of Carthage starring Shiloh Fernandez and Keisha Castle-Hughes.

Train is listed in as one of "10 New Artists You Need to Know Right Now" in the May 2014 issue of Rolling Stone Magazine.

She performed five songs on the soundtrack of the 2015 film Jenny's Wedding: True Love Avenue, Chase Me Away, Lost in Love, Sunny Side of the Street, and Baile Baile.

Kristina Train sang the songs "When the Shy Star" and "Sleep Now" (with Julian Lennon) on the album Goldenhair by Brian Byrne released in 2017.

Kristina Train co-wrote the song "They Don't Shine" with Mike Mattison on Signs, the fourth studio album by American blues rock group Tedeschi Trucks Band. The album was released on February 15, 2019, by Fantasy Records.

Kristina Train provided the soundtrack for Gap's Fall 2020 "Stand United" ad campaign with her soulful cover of The Youngbloods' 1969 song, "Get Together". The campaign promoted a message of unity and connection during a time when the pandemic highlighted the need for it, according to Gap Inc..

== Background Vocals ==
Scrapomatic- Alligator Love Cry (2006)

Marc Cohn- Listening Booth: 1970 (2010)

M.Craft- Blood Moon (2016)

Steve Mason (The Beta Band)- Meet the Humans (2016)

Joshua Hedley- Don't Waste Your Tears (2016)

Paul McDonald- Modern Hearts (2021)

== Covers ==
Lorrie Morgan- Spilt Milk (2016)

In 2016 country singer Lorrie Morgan recorded a cover version of Spilt Milk on her album Letting Go...Slow. Morgan recalls, "Get this: I'm sitting at a table with Anita Baker, and I thought I was going to die. She is one of my favorite singers, and we're sitting there talking, and this beautiful woman walks out onstage and had this big band, and she starts singing this song called "Spilt Milk." And I'm sitting here thinking, 'Please, God, don't let anyone in here think they want to cut this song, because I'm gonna record this song!'" Morgan obtained a copy of the track and proceeded to play it every single day. In fact, she held onto "Spilt Milk" for 10 years because she knew that, someday, "someone would agree with me that it is a 'me' song." She performed the song at the Grand Ole Opry on February 23, 2016, to coincide with its release and personally invited Kristina Train to the performance as her guest.

== Discography ==
=== Studio albums ===
Title	Album details
Spilt Milk	Released: October 20, 2009; Label: Blue Note Records; Formats: CD, digital download
Dark Black	Released: November 5, 2012 (UK); Label: Mercury Records; Formats: CD, digital download
Rayon City	Released: July 20, 2021; Label: self-released; Formats: digital download
Body Pressure	Released: October 31, 2022; Label: self-released; Formats: digital download
County Line	Released: September 19, 2025; Label: Blue Elan Records; Formats: CD, digital download, Vinyl
