= The Homesick =

Dutch band post-punk band

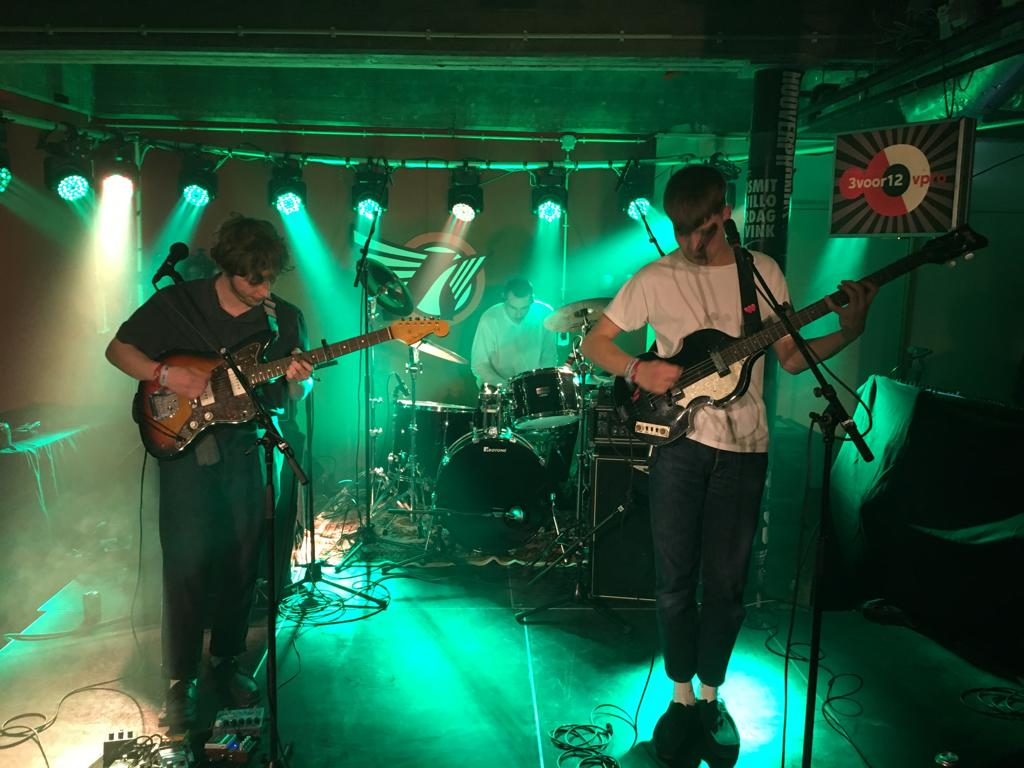
- The Homesick at the Eurosonic (2018).

Background information
- Origin: Dokkum, Netherlands
- Genres: Alternative rock, post-punk revival
- Years active: 2012-present
- Labels: Sub Pop, Subroutine, Siluh Records
- Members: Jaap van der Velde; Elias Elgersma; Erik Woudwijk

The Homesick are a Dutch post-punk band from Dokkum, in the north of the Netherlands. The band is composed of drummer Erik Woudwijk, bassist Jaap van der Velde and guitarist Elias Elgersma.

They have released the albums Youth Hunt (Subroutine, 2017), The Big Exercise (Sub Pop, 2020) The Homesick (self-released, 2023). and What’s Up With All These Shangri-Las (Siluh Records, 2026)
