= Become the Media =

Studio album by Jello Biafra
- Released: April 17, 2000
- Recorded: January 27 – March 23, 2000
- Genre: Spoken word
- Length: 161:10
- Label: Alternative Tentacles
- Producer: Jello Biafra

Jello Biafra chronology
If Evolution Is Outlawed, Only Outlaws Will Evolve (1998)	Become the Media (2000)	The Big Ka-Boom, Pt. 1 (2002)

Professional ratings
Review scores
Source	Rating
Allmusic	2.5/5 stars

Become the Media is the sixth spoken word album by Jello Biafra. Topics covered include the WTO Meeting of 1999, the 2000 presidential election, the Green Party, the International Monetary Fund, the Columbine High School massacre, and the H.O.P.E. conference.

== Track listing ==
=== Disc one ===
No.	Title	Length
1.	"Intro: Gary Dugger"	2:00
2.	"The Green Wedge"	12:10
3.	"K.O. the W.T.O."	35:13
4.	"Hellburbia"	27:07
Total length:		76:30

=== Disc two ===
No.	Title	Length
5.	"Hack the Planet"	55:59
6.	"World Bunk & International Monetary Fraud"	19:16
Total length:		75:15

=== Disc three ===
No.	Title	Length
7.	"Frankenfood Landscape: Where Are We Going?"	3:00
8.	"Philadelphia Stories"	30:40
9.	"If You Like Tipper, You'll Love..."	20:45
10.	"Become the Media"	15:00
Total length:		69:25

== Personnel ==
- Jello Biafra - producer, concept
- Jim Altieri - cover photo
- Mark Kellye - editing
- Jason Rosenberg - construction
- Jeff Williams - engineer
