= Spilt Milk (Kristina Train album) =

Studio album by Kristina Train
- Released: October 20, 2009
- Genre: Soul; jazz; blues; rhythm and blues
- Length: 39:47
- Label: Blue Note Records
- Producer: Jimmy Hogarth

Kristina Train chronology
Spilt Milk (2009)	Dark Black (2012)

Spilt Milk is the debut album by Kristina Train, released on October 20, 2009. Her record label at the time, Blue Note Records, had initially been interested in pairing Train with Norah Jones producer Lee Alexander, but instead she went to London in 2007 and asked Jimmy Hogarth to produce the album. Train cowrote eight songs on the album, collaborating with Hogarth, Eg White, and Ed Harcourt. Train also arranged and overdubbed strings on three tracks on Spilt Milk. The extended version of the release contains the Carolyn Franklin & Jimmy Radcliffe song "If You Want Me".

In 2016 Lorrie Morgan covered the album's title track on her album Letting Go...Slow.

== Track listing ==
No.	Title	Writer(s)	Length
1.	"Spilt Milk"	Kristina Train, Jimmy Hogarth, Francis "Eg" White	3:38
2.	"No Man's Land"	Beverley Knight, J. Hogarth, F. White	3:29
3.	"Don't Remember"	F. White, David Arnold	3:58
4.	"Don't Beg for Love"	K. Train, J. Hogarth, F. White	3:02
5.	"It's Over Now"	K. Train, J. Hogarth, F. White	3:17
6.	"You're Still Going to Lose"	K. Train, J. Hogarth, F. White	3:13
7.	"Moon Rivers and Such"	F. White, Bob Berts	4:17
8.	"I Can't But Help"	K. Train, J. Hogarth, Ed Harcourt	4:40
9.	"Call in the Maker"	K. Train, J. Hogarth, F. White	3:20
10.	"Half Light"	K. Train, J. Hogarth, F. White	3:33
11.	"Far from the Country"	K. Train, J. Hogarth, E. Harcourt	3:21
Total length:			39:47

iTunes version
No.	Title	Writer(s)	Length
12.	"Waltzing Back"	K. Train, J. Hogarth, E. Harcourt	3:53
13.	"If You Want Me"	Carolyn Franklin, Jimmy Radcliffe	3:06
