= Sub Pop 200 =

- Artwork by Charles Burns

Compilation album by Sub Pop Records
- Released: December 28, 1988
- Recorded: 1986–1988
- Genres: Alternative rock; grunge; punk rock; heavy metal
- Length: 71 min
- Label: Sub Pop
- Producers: Bruce Calder; Jack Endino; Steve Fisk; Chris Hanzsek

Sub Pop Records chronology
Sub Pop 100 (1986)	Sub Pop 200 (1988)	The Grunge Years (1991)

Sub Pop 200 is a compilation released in the early days of the Seattle grunge scene (December 1988). It features songs (all of them first releases and some otherwise unattainable) from Tad, the Fluid, Nirvana, Steven "Jesse" Bernstein, Mudhoney, the Walkabouts, Terry Lee Hale, Soundgarden, Green River, Fastbacks, Blood Circus, Swallow, Chemistry Set, Girl Trouble, the Nights and Days, Cat Butt, Beat Happening, Screaming Trees, Steve Fisk, and the Thrown Ups.

Many of these bands went on to be influential in the early 1990s and onwards. Most notable of these were Nirvana, Soundgarden, Green River (who spawned Mudhoney and Mother Love Bone and later Temple of the Dog and Pearl Jam), Screaming Trees, and Mudhoney.

== Packaging ==
The artwork an illustration by comics artist Charles Burns, who previously illustrated Sub Pop zine covers and posters. While it would provide the full cover art in CD releases, the original release has an all-black cover with a top right sticker featuring Burns's art and the artists heard on the album. Typical of Sub Pop releases, the album is limited to 5,000 copies, and also comes with a 16-page booklet.

== Release and reception ==
Professional ratings
Review scores
Source	Rating
AllMusic	4/5 stars

The original release consists of three 12" EPs and is the only one to be pressed on records. All reissues would be on CD.

== Track listing ==
1. "Sex God Missy" – Tad
2. "Is It Day I'm Seeing?" – The Fluid
3. "Spank Thru" – Nirvana
4. "Come Out Tonight" – Steven J. Bernstein
5. "The Rose" – Mudhoney (Amanda McBroom cover)
6. "Got No Chains" – The Walkabouts
7. "Dead Is Dead" – Terry Lee Hale
8. "Sub Pop Rock City" – Soundgarden
9. "Hangin' Tree" – Green River
10. "Swallow My Pride" – Fastbacks (Green River cover)
11. "The Outback" – Blood Circus
12. "Zoo" – Swallow
13. "Underground" – Chemistry Set
14. "Gonna Find a Cave" – Girl Trouble
15. "Split" – The Nights and Days
16. "Big Cigar" – Cat Butt
17. "Pajama Party in a Haunted Hive" – Beat Happening
18. "Love or Confusion" – Screaming Trees (Jimi Hendrix Experience)
19. "Untitled" – Steve Fisk
20. "You Lost It" – The Thrown Ups

== Charts ==
Chart (1989)	Peak position
US Alternative Albums (Cashbox)	36

== See also ==
- Sub Pop 100
- Sub Pop 1000
