= If Evolution Is Outlawed, Only Outlaws Will Evolve =

Studio album by Jello Biafra
- Released: October 27, 1998
- Recorded: April 27, 1996 – July 16, 1998
- Genre: Spoken word
- Length: 196:00
- Label: Alternative Tentacles
- Producer: Jello Biafra

Jello Biafra chronology
| Beyond the Valley of the Gift Police (1994) | If Evolution Is Outlawed, Only Outlaws Will Evolve (1998) | Become the Media (2000) |

Professional ratings
Review scores
| Source | Rating |
|---|---|
| Allmusic | 4/5 stars |

If Evolution Is Outlawed, Only Outlaws Will Evolve is the fifth spoken-word album by Jello Biafra.

== Track listing ==
=== Disc one ===
| No. | Title | Length |
|---|---|---|
| 1. | "Depends on the Drug" | 1:15 |
| 2. | "Talk on the Death Penalty/When Psychopaths Guard the Henhouse" | 3:23 |
| 3. | "The Murder of Mumia Abu-Jamal" | 6:48 |
| 4. | "Clinton Comes to Long Beach" | 2:52 |
| 5. | "The Hex-Files: Space Shuttle Sequels" | 9:16 |
| 6. | "Half-Time" | 4:19 |
| 7. | "The New Soviet Union" | 26:02 |
| Total length: | | 53:55 |

=== Disc two ===
| No. | Title | Length |
|---|---|---|
| 8. | "Talk on Censorship - It Takes a Pillage to Raze a Child/Talk on Censorship-The Contract on America" | 71:00 |
| Total length: | | 71:00 |

=== Disc three ===
| No. | Title | Length |
|---|---|---|
| 9. | "Talk on Censorship: Bridge to the New Dark Ages/Talk on Censorship: Which Way to the Zoo?" | 47:42 |
| 10. | "Wake Up and Smell the Noise" | 23:22 |
| Total length: | | 71:04 |
