= Step on a Bug =

Studio album by the U-Men
- Released: 1988
- Genre: Punk rock; post-punk; garage rock; noise rock
- Label: Black Label
- Producer: John Nelson, the U-Men

The U-Men chronology
Stop Spinning (EP) (1985)	Step on a Bug (1988)	Solid Action (1999)

Step on a Bug is the sole studio album by Seattle-based grunge pioneers the U-Men. It was released in 1988 on Black Label Records.

== Track listing ==
1. "Whistlin' Pete"
2. "2 X 4"
3. "A Three Year Old Could Do That"
4. "Juice Party"
5. "Flea Circus"
6. "Too Good to Be Food"
7. "Willie Dong Hurts Dogs"
8. "Papa Doesn't Love His Children Anymore"
9. "Pay the Bubba"
10. "Solid Action" (bonus track on UK CD version)
11. "Dig It a Hole" (bonus track on UK CD version)
