= Best Kissers in the World =

American rock band

- Origin: Phoenix, Arizona, U.S.
- Genres: Post-grunge, pop punk
- Years active: 1991–1996
- Labels: Sub Pop, MCA
- Past members: Gerald Collier; Danny Bland; Andhi Spath; Sten Olson; Dave Swafford; Tim Arnold; Jimmy Paulson; Jeff Stone; Paul Schurr

Best Kissers in the World is an American rock band from Seattle, Washington, formed in 1989 in Phoenix, AZ.

== History ==
The original lineup consisted of Gerald Collier (lead vocals, guitar) and Danny Bland (bass, also of Cat Butt and Dwarves) who relocated to Seattle in 1988 where they added Sten Olson (guitar) and Andhi Spath (drums) shortly before signing to Sub Pop records. In 1991, the band released their eponymously named debut EP (Produced by Jon Auer of The Posies and Big Star) and toured with L7, Social Distortion, and Pegboy. After replacing Bland, Olson, and Spath with Dave Swafford, Jimmy Paulson (The Lemons), and Tim Arnold (Cherry Poppin' Daddies) the band signed with MCA Records and, in early 1993, released a second EP, entitled Puddin. After touring in support of the MCA EP, Jimmy Paulson left the band to return to his former band The Lemons and was replaced by guitarist Jeff Stone in time to record their first full-length album Been There.

In 1995, after touring with School of Fish, Chainsaw Kittens, and X Dave Swafford left and was replaced by Paul Schurr (of Flop) who toured with the band and recorded on their final MCA album, Yellow Brick Roadkill. In 1995, the band was dropped from MCA's lineup just weeks before Yellow Brick Roadkill was to be released. The record was finally released with additional demo and alternate versions of the songs by the small label Hail the Sound in May 2012 Collier reformed the band briefly in 2007 and again in 2010 and played shows in Portland, OR and Seattle, WA.

== Band members ==
Former members

- Gerald Collier – guitar, lead vocals (formation-2007)
- Danny Bland – bass (formation–1992)
- Sten Olsen – lead guitar (1991–1993)
- Andhi Spath – drums (1991-1992)
- Brian Kenney
- Dave Swafford – bass (1992-1994)
- Jimmy Paulson – lead guitar (1993)
- Jeff Stone – lead guitar (1993–1996)
- Tim Arnold – drums (1993–1996)
- Paul Schurr – bass (1995–1996)
- Mark Kent - lead guitar (2010)
- Andy Nelsen - bass (2010)
- Kevin Byers - drums (2010)

== Discography ==
Studio albums

- Been There (MCA 1993)
- Yellow Brick Roadkill (Recorded 1996, Hail the Sound Records 2012)

EPs

- Best Kissers in the World (Sub Pop 1991)
- Puddin (MCA 1993)

Singles

- Goldfish Bowl (Sub Pop 1991)
- Take me Home (Lucky Records 1992)
- Broke my Knee (Crackpot 1992)
- Sweet Pea (Lucky Records 1993)
- Bleeder (MCA 1994)
- Skinned My Heart, Broke My Knee (Hail The Sound Records 2011)

Compilations

- Pick up the Tempo Twisted Willie, Tribute to Willie Nelson (1996)
