= Stop Spinning =

EP by The U-Men
- Released: 1985
- Genre: Punk rock; post-punk; garage rock; noise rock
- Label: Homestead

The U-Men chronology
U-Men (EP) (1984)	Stop Spinning (1985)	Step on a Bug (1988)

Stop Spinning is the second EP by the band The U-Men, released in 1985. It was recorded by John Nelson at Crow Studio in Seattle.

== Track listing ==
1. Clubs
2. The Fumes
3. Cow Rock
4. Green Trumpet
5. A Year and a Day
6. Ten After One
