= The Sorrows =

English rock band formed in 1963

- Origin: Coventry, Warwickshire, England
- Genres: Freakbeat
- Label: Piccadilly
- Past members: Phil Packham; Don Fardon

The Sorrows are a rock band formed in 1963 in Coventry, Warwickshire, England, by Pip Whitcher, and were part of the British beat boom of the 1960s. They were a fixture in the mod scene and their later work is sometimes referred to as freakbeat.

== Career ==
The band was formed in 1963, and toured Germany for a month, playing several sets each day. The band's first recording was a version of "Smoke Gets in Your Eyes", recorded in Joe Meek's bathroom. They were signed by Pye subsidiary Piccadilly Records, and began working with producer John Schroeder. Their line-up included Fardon, Whitcher, Juckes, Packham and Finlay.

The Sorrows released their first album, Take a Heart, in 1965 on Piccadilly. The Sorrows played a hard, aggressive version of contemporary R&B; later this style of music was termed freakbeat.

After the band achieved a minor chart position on the UK Singles Chart, Phil Packham and Don Fardon left the group. Fardon had a UK chart hit with "Indian Reservation". Wez Price joined the group on bass guitar, Roger Lomas became lead guitarist, and Pip Whitcher did vocals. The band relocated to Italy, where they were moderately successful. Whitcher and Lomas later recorded at Air Studios under Mike Sullivan.

Lomas in the early 1980s became a record producer for his own company, ROLO productions, and produced 1980s ska bands such as Bad Manners. In 2003 Lomas produced the Grammy Award winning album, Jamaican E.T. for Lee "Scratch" Perry.

In 2011, the band was re-formed by Fardon and Packham, and they began performing live again. The new line-up comprised Fardon (vocals), Packham (bass guitar and vocals), Nigel Lomas (drums and vocals), Marcus Webb (guitar) and Brian Wilkins (guitar, harmonica and vocals).

== Personnel ==
=== Initial line-up ===
- Philip (Pip) Whitcher – (born 6 May 1943, Coventry) – lead guitar and vocals.
- Don Fardon – (born Donald Arthur Maughn, 19 August 1940, Coventry) – vocals
- Philip (Phil) Packham – (born 13 June 1945, Bidford-on-Avon, near Stratford, Warwickshire) – bass guitar
- Terry Juckes – (born 27 August 1943, Broadway, Worcestershire ) – rhythm guitar and vocals
- Bruce Finlay – (born 20 September 1944, Huntly, Aberdeenshire, Scotland died 12 October 2022) – drums

=== After 1966 ===
- Philip (Pip) Whitcher – rhythm guitar and vocals
- Wesley 'Wez' Price – bass – (born 19 July 1945, Coventry, Warwickshire)
- Roger (Rog) Lomas – lead guitar (born Roger David Lomas, 8 October 1948, Keresley Hospital, Coventry, Warwickshire). 1966 – 1967
- Bruce Finlay – drums
- Chuck Fryers – guitar, vocals. (born Alan Paul Fryers, 24 May 1945, Bognor Regis, West Sussex). 1967 – 1969
- Geoff Prior – bass. 1967 –
- Chris Smith – lead vocals, Hammond organ
- Rod Davies – guitar, vocals. 1968 – (born Roderick Thomas Davies, 28 March 1946, Ivor, Buckinghamshire)

=== After 2011 ===
- Don Fardon – lead vocals
- Phil Packham – bass guitar and vocals
- Nigel Lomas – drums and vocals (born 17 August 1942, Keresley Hospital, Coventry) (Played on some recordings late 1960s)
- Marcus Webb – lead guitar
- Brian Wilkins – guitar, harmonica and vocals

=== After 2013 ===
- Don Fardon – lead vocals
- Nigel Lomas – drums and vocals
- Marcus Webb – lead guitar
- Brian Wilkins – guitar, harmonica and vocals.
- Mark Mortimer – bass guitar (replaced Phil Packham in October 2013)
- Paul Rollason – lead guitar (replaced Marcus Webb in March 2017)

== Discography ==
=== Singles ===
- "I Don't Wanna Be Free" / "Come With Me" (Piccadilly 7N 35219) 1965
- "Baby" / "Teenage Letter" (Piccadilly 7N 35230) 1965
- "Take a Heart" / "We Should Get Along Fine" (Piccadilly 7N 35260/Warner Bros. 5662 [US release]) 1965 – UK Singles Chart – No. 21
- "Nimm mein Herz" (German version of "Take a Heart") / "Sie war mein Girl" (Deutsche Vogue DV 14 449) 1965
- "You've Got What I Want" / "No No No No" (Piccadilly 7N 35277) 1966
- "Let The Live Live" / "Don't Sing No Sad Songs For Me" (Piccadilly 7N 35309) 1966
- "Let Me In" / "How Love Used To Be" (Piccadilly 7N 35336) 1966
- "Pink, Purple, Yellow and Red" / "My Gal" (Piccadilly 7N 35385) 1967
- "C'mon Everybody" / "Let's Have A Party" (Telefunken 6.12020 AC) 1977
- "Gonna Find A Cave"/"Don't Do That", "Doin' Alright Tonight" (EP) (Rise Above, RISE7188) 2014

=== Albums ===
- Take a Heart – (Pye NPL 38023), (1965) ("Baby" / "No No No No" / "Take a Heart" / "She's Got The Action" / "How Love Used To Be" / "Teenage Letter" / "I Don't Wanna Be Free" / "Don't Sing No Sad Songs For Me" / "Cara-lin" / "We Should Get Along Fine" / "Come With Me" / "Let Me In")
- Old Songs, New Songs – (Miura MIU 10011) (1967); officially reissued on CD by Wooden Hill Records (WHCD026) – 2009
- Pink, Purple, Yellow and Red – (LP, Bam-Caruso KIRI 089) (1987)
- The Sorrows – (CD, Sequel Records NEXCD 165) (1991)
