= Sub Pop 100 =

Compilation album by Sub Pop Records
- Released: September 15, 1986
- Recorded: 1981–1986
- Genres: Alternative rock, spoken word, punk rock, hardcore punk, heavy metal, indie rock
- Length: 30:25
- Label: Sub Pop

Sub Pop Records chronology
Sub Pop 100 (1986)	Sub Pop 200 (1988)

Sub Pop 100 is a rock compilation album, the first LP released by Sub Pop in 1986.

There were only 5000 copies made of the album, making it extremely sought out by collectors. There also exists a cassette edition.

== Track listing ==
1. "Spoken Word Intro Thing" - Steve Albini (0:50)
2. "Greatest Gift" - Scratch Acid (2:03)
3. "Nothin' to Prove" (Live) - Wipers (2:07)
4. "Kill Yr Idols" - Sonic Youth (2:47)
5. "Bananacuda" - Naked Raygun (1:41)
6. "Gila" - U-Men (2:16)
7. "Smile on Your Face" - Dangerous Birds (2:55)
8. "Church in Hell" - Skinny Puppy (3:12)
9. "Go at Full Throttle" - Steve Fisk (2:29)
10. "Itsbeena" - Lupe Diaz (1:14)
11. "Impact Test" - Boy Dirt Car (1:22)
12. "Real Men" - Savage Republic (3:12)
13. "One Day of the Factory" - Shonen Knife (3:55)

== See also ==
- Sub Pop 200
- Sub Pop 1000
