= U-Men =

American rock band

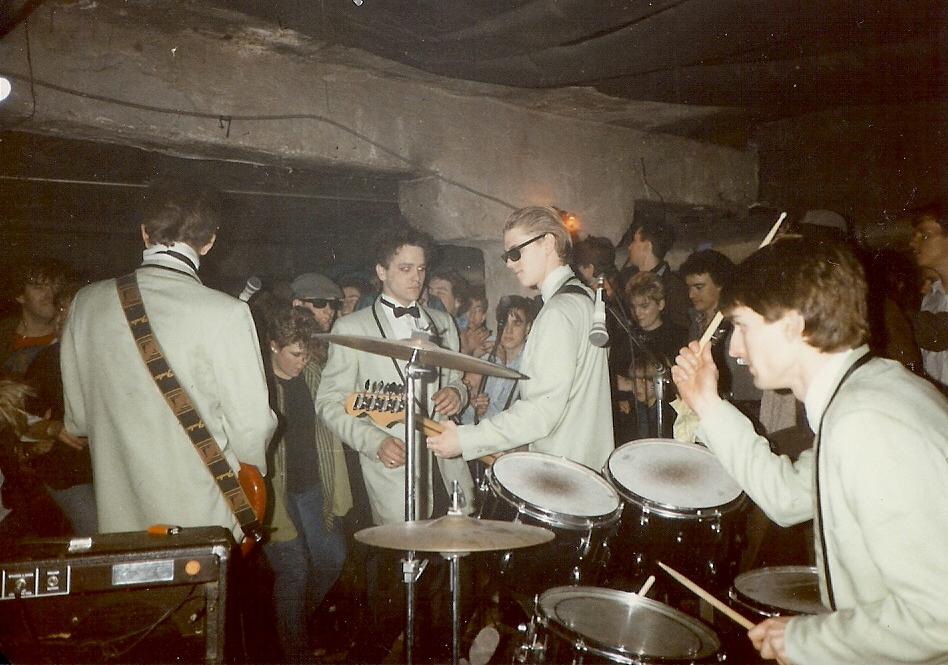

Background information
- Origin: Seattle, Washington, U.S.
- Genres: Punk rock; post-punk; garage rock; noise rock; rockabilly
- Years active: 1980–1989
- Labels: Bombshelter; Homestead; C/Z; Sub Pop; El Jefe; Black Label; Amphetamine Reptile; Chuckie-Boy
- Members: John Bigley; Tom Price; Jim Tillman; Charlie Ryan
- Past members: Tom Hazelmyer; Robin Buchan; Tony Ransom

U-Men were an American rock band, formed in Seattle, Washington, in 1980 and active until 1989. They toured extensively across the United States. Their musically "dirty" sound and off-the-wall sense of humor were a forerunner for the later grunge bands to come out of Seattle.

== History ==
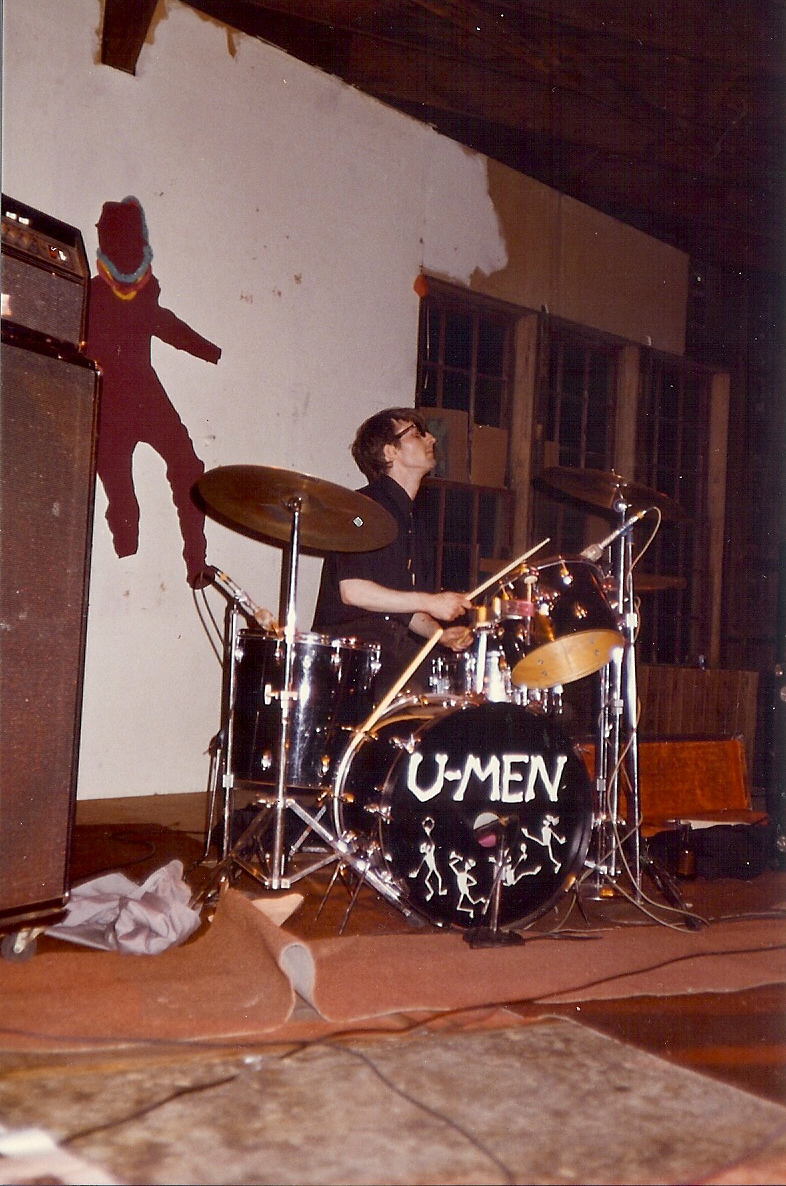
Drummer Charlie Ryan performing with U-Men in a Seattle club

U-Men were fronted by vocalist John Bigley. The band also included charter members Tom Price on guitar and Charlie "Chaz" Ryan on drums, along with bassists Robin Buchan, Jim Tillman, Tom Hazelmyer and later Tony "Tone Deaf" Ransom. Their alternative rock sound was credited by Allmusic for helping to inspire the Seattle grunge sound.

In 1983, U-Men became the first band managed by renowned Seattle band manager Susan Silver.

Butthole Surfers named the song "The O-Men", from the album Locust Abortion Technician, in their honor.

Tom Price moved on to form Gas Huffer, and also play in The Monkeywrench. Bigley and Ryan co-founded The Crows. Jim Tillman, who is recognized as the main line-up bass player having played on the first two full releases which included the self-titled EP, "The U-Men" (1984), "Stop Spinning" (1985), and the Deep Six compilation (1986) track "They", went on to play bass for other local bands, most notably Love Battery. Mark Arm from Mudhoney noted on Sub Pop's anthology release announcement that the band was never the same after Tillman's departure.

Tom Hazelmyer briefly played with the band but left to remain in his hometown of Minneapolis (performing live just three times with the band, including when they opened for Big Black at the Showbox Theater in March 1987) to promote his record company (Amphetamine Reptile Records) and band, Halo of Flies.

== Influences ==
The U-Men cited influences including Iggy Pop, Captain Beefheart, Pere Ubu, the Birthday Party, Gang of Four and Public Image Ltd.

== Band members ==
- John Bigley – vocals (1980–1989)
- Tom Price – guitar (1980–1989)
- Charlie Ryan – drums (1980–1989)
- Robin Buchan – bass (1980–1982)
- Jim Tillman – bass (1982–1987)
- Tom Hazelmyer – bass (1987)
- Tony Ransom – bass (1987–1989)

== Discography ==
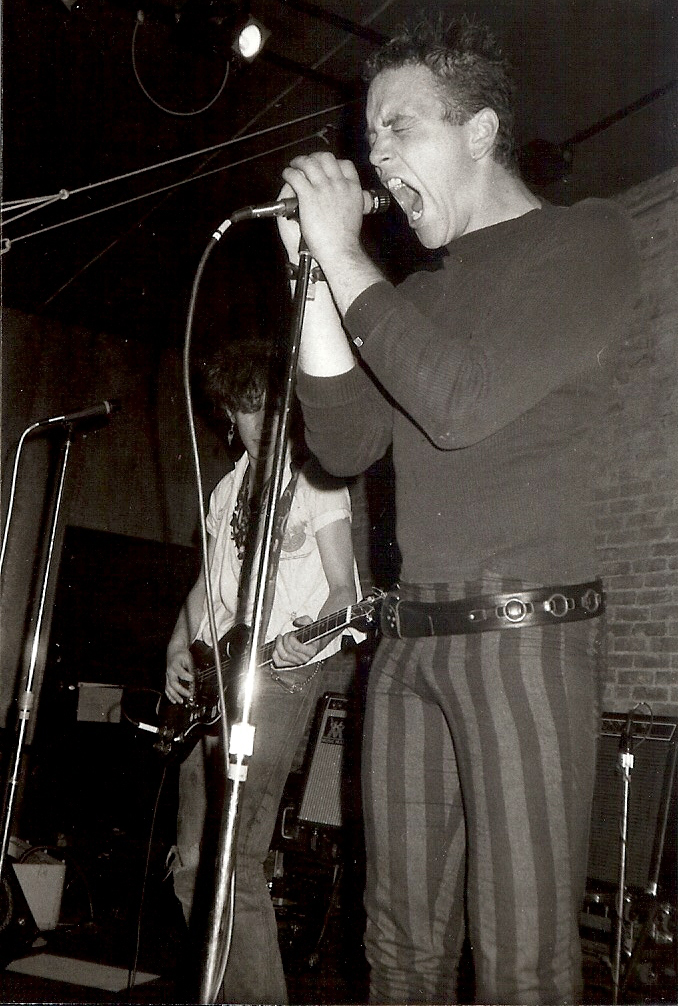
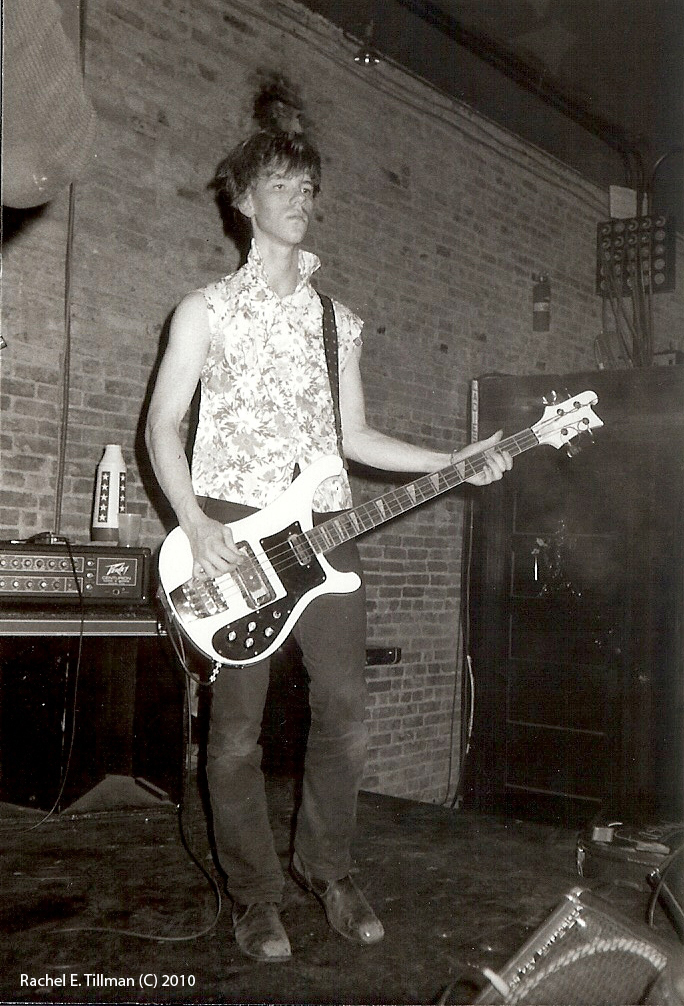
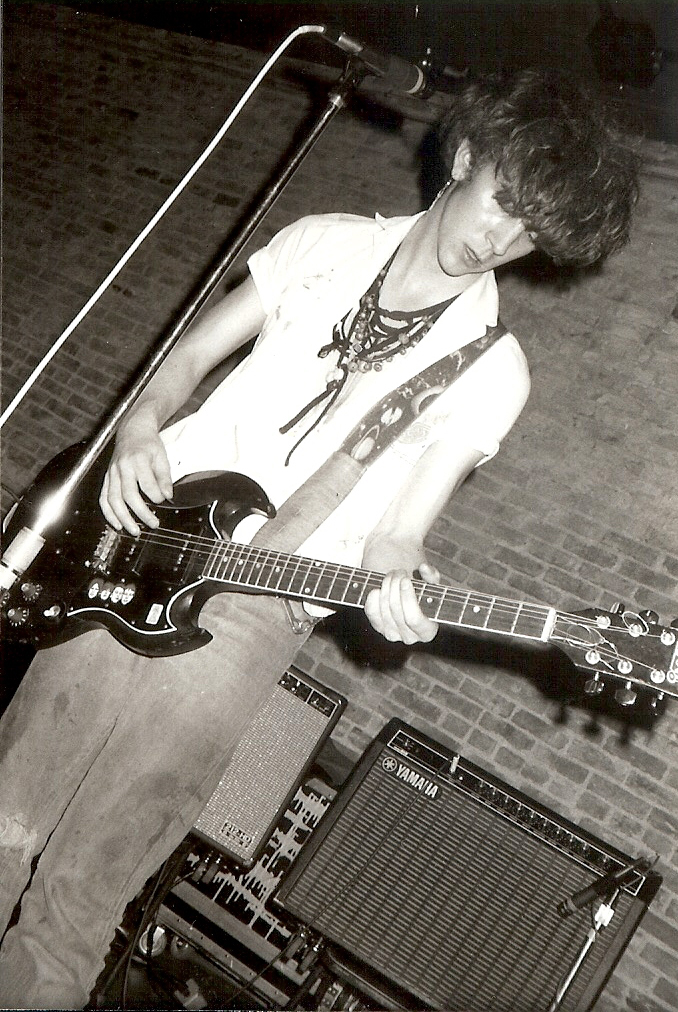
The U-Men performing at the Metropolis in Seattle in 1983. From L/R, vocalist John Bigley, bassist Jim Tillman, and guitarist Tom Price.

=== Albums ===
- Step on a Bug (Black Label Records, 1988)

=== Singles and EPs ===
- U-Men EP (Bomb Shelter Records, 1984)
- Stop Spinning EP (Homestead Records, 1985)
- "Solid Action" b/w "Dig It A Hole" (Black Label Records, 1987)
- "Freezebomb" b/w "That's Wild About Jack" (Amphetamine Reptile, 1988)
- Sugar Daddy Live Split Series Vol. 1 (Amphetamine Reptile, 2012; split with the Melvins)

=== Compilation albums ===
- Solid Action (Chuckie-Boy Records, 1999)
- U-Men (Self-titled anthology, Sub Pop, 2017)

=== Compilation and soundtrack contributions ===
- "Blue Christmas" on the Christmas '84 compilation
- "They" on the Deep Six compilation (C/Z Records, 1986)
- "Shoot 'Em Down (live)" on the Woodshock '85 compilation (El Jefe Records, 1986)
- "Gila" on the Sub Pop 100 compilation (Sub Pop Records, 1986)
- "Bad Little Woman" on the Dope-Guns-'N-Fucking In The Streets, Vol. 1 compilation (Amphetamine Reptile, 1988)
- "Bad Little Woman" on the Dope-Guns-'N-Fucking In The Streets, Vols. 1-3 compilation (Amphetamine Reptile, 1989)
- "Dig It a Hole" on the Hype! soundtrack (Sub Pop Records, 1996)
