= Martin Craft =

- Also known as: M. Craft
- Born: Martin Craft; 18 January 1976 (age 50); Canberra, Australia
- Occupations: Songwriter, musician, composer, record producer
- Instruments: Piano, guitar
- Labels: Heavenly Recordings; Spunk Records
- Formerly of: Sidewinder
- Website: Official website

Martin Craft is an Australian songwriter, producer, and composer. Usually recording under the name M.Craft, he has released several albums on various labels, most recently signing with London's Heavenly Recordings. He is also known as a songwriter and collaborator for various other recording artists. For several years he played guitar and toured with Jarvis Cocker.
