= Girl Trouble (band) =

American garage rock band

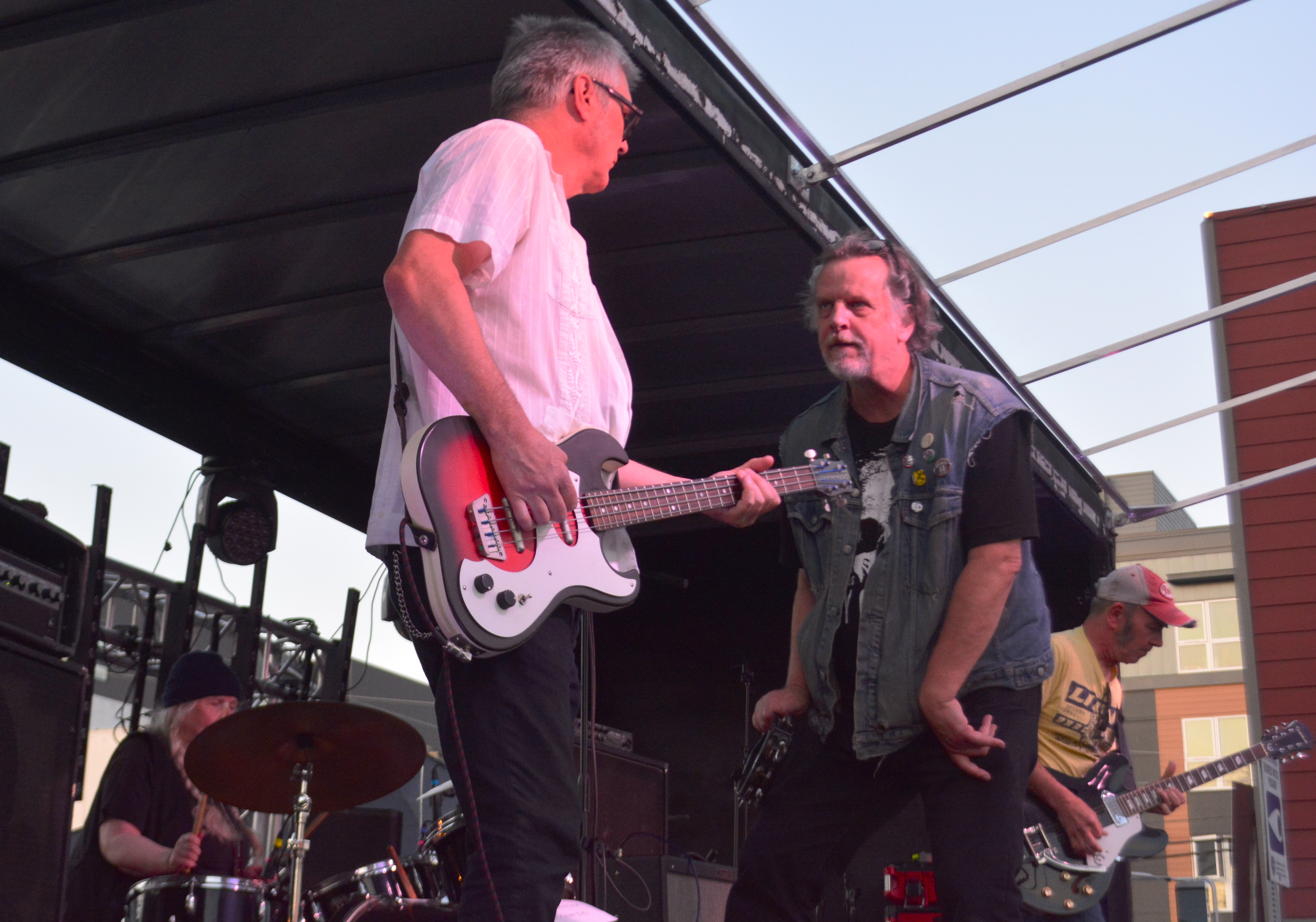
- Girl Trouble, 2024

Background information
- Origin: Tacoma, Washington, U.S.
- Genres: Indie rock, punk rock, garage rock
- Years active: 1983–present
- Labels: Sub Pop, K, Empty, Estrus, Wig Out!, Dionysus, PopLlama, Sympathy for the Record Industry
- Members: Kurt P. Kendall; Bon Von Wheelie; Kahuna; Dale Phillips
- Past members: David Duet

Girl Trouble is a garage rock band formed in Tacoma, Washington in 1983.

== History ==
Brother and sister, (Kahuna and Bon) started playing together in the family shed in Tacoma. Friends Dale Phillips and KP Kendall joined soon after. Girl Trouble played their first show in 1984, and signed to Olympia's K Records label, on which they released two singles ("Riverbed" and "Old Time Religion") in 1987. One of their recordings, "Gonna Find a Cave" written by Jimmy Radcliffe and Buddy Scott, made an appearance on the Sub Pop 200 compilation alongside tracks by Nirvana and Soundgarden. Various albums followed on different independent labels. They spent many years touring all over the US, Canada and Europe. As a side project, guitarist Kahuna plays in a Sonics tribute band called New Original Sonic Sound, featuring members of Mudhoney and the Young Fresh Fellows.

== Members ==
Current members include Kurt P. Kendall (vocals, saxophone), Bon Von Wheelie (drums), Kahuna (guitar), and Dale Phillips (bass guitar). David Duet (vocals - 1984–1986) is a former member.

== Discography ==
=== Albums ===
- Hit It or Quit It (1988)(Sub Pop/K Records)
- Thrillsphere (1990) (Pop Llama)
- New American Shame (1993) (Empty)
- Tuesdays, Thursdays, and Sundays (1998) (Wig Out)
- The Illusion of Excitement (2003) (Wig Out)
- As Is (2026) (K Reco/Wig Out!)

=== EPs and singles ===
- She No Rattle My Cage (7", K Records, 1987)
- Old Time Religion (7", K Records, 1987)
- Blue Christmas / Sleigh Ride / X-Mess (7" split with Kings of Rock, Regal Select Records, 1989)
- When Opposites Attract (7", Wig Out! Records, 1989)
- Batman Theme (Instrumental) (7" with Steve Fisk, K Records, 1989)
- Stomp and Shout and Work It on Out (EP, Dionysus Records, 1990)
- Cleopatra and the Slaves (7", Wig Out! Records, 1990)
- Sister Mary Motorcycle / Take Up the Slack, Daddy-O (7" split with the A-Bones, Cruddy Record Dealership, 1991)
- Plays (2x7", Sympathy for the Record Industry, 1992)
- Work that Crowd / Granny's Pad (7", Empty Records, 1992)
- Don't Be Grateful / Cold Shoulder (7", split with Popdefect, Dionysus Records, 1995)
- The Track / Scorpio 9 (7", Estrus Records, 1996)
- Kick Out The Jams! / You Got What It Takes! (7", split with the Mono Men, Gearhead Records, 1996)
- I Know Why Santa is Drunk/Letter to Santa (7", split with the Dignitaries, Unsmashable Records, 2013)

=== Compilation appearances ===
- “Gonna Find a Cave” on Sub Pop 200 (1988) (Sub Pop)
- "Louie Louie" on Stomp and Shout and Work It on Out !!!! (1990) (Dionysus Records)
- "Bring on the Dancing Girls" on International Pop Underground Convention (1992) (K Records)
- "Tarantula" on International Hip Swing (1993) (K Records)
- "My Home Town" on Hype! Soundtrack (1996) (Sub Pop)
- "The Track" on Estrus Sampler: 26 Excellent Spicy Sizzlers (1999) (Estrus Records)
