= Sub Pop =

American record label

- We're Not the Best, But We're Pretty Good
- Parent company: Warner Music Group (49%)
- Founded: 1986
- Founder: Bruce Pavitt, Jonathan Poneman
- Status: Active
- Distributors: ADA (US); Outside Music (Canada); Merlin Network (digital)
- Genre: Alternative rock; punk rock; indie pop; hip-hop; comedy
- Country of origin: United States
- Location: Seattle, Washington
- Official website: subpop.com

Sub Pop is an independent record label founded in 1986 in Seattle by Bruce Pavitt and Jonathan Poneman. Sub Pop achieved fame in the early 1990s for signing Seattle bands such as Nirvana, Soundgarden, Sunny Day Real Estate and Mudhoney, central players in the grunge movement. They are often credited with helping popularize grunge music. The label's roster includes Fleet Foxes, Tad, Beach House, The Postal Service, Sleater-Kinney, Flight of the Conchords, Foals, Blitzen Trapper, Father John Misty, Wolf Parade, clipping., Shabazz Palaces, Weyes Blood, Guerilla Toss, Bully, La Luz, Low, METZ, Rolling Blackouts Coastal Fever, Kiwi Jr., Built to Spill, Sunn O))), TV Priest and The Shins. In 1995, the owners of Sub Pop sold a 49% stake of the label to the Warner Music Group.

== History ==
=== Formation ===
The origins of Sub Pop trace back to the early 1980s, when Bruce Pavitt started a fanzine called Subterranean Pop that focused exclusively on American independent record labels. Pavitt undertook the project in order to earn course credit while attending Evergreen State College in Olympia, Washington. By the fourth issue, Pavitt had shortened the name to Sub Pop and began alternating issues with compilation tapes of underground rock bands. The Sub Pop #5 cassette, released in 1982, sold two thousand copies. In 1983, Pavitt moved to Seattle, Washington, and released the ninth and final issue of Sub Pop. While in Seattle, he wrote a column for local music magazine The Rocket titled "Sub Pop U.S.A.", a column he ended in 1988.

In 1986, Pavitt released the first Sub Pop LP, the compilation Sub Pop 100, which featured material by artists including Sonic Youth, Naked Raygun, Wipers, and Scratch Acid. Seattle group Green River chose to record their Dry as a Bone EP for Pavitt's new label in June 1986; Pavitt couldn't afford to release it until the following year. When finally released, Dry as a Bone was promoted by Sub Pop as "ultra-loose grunge that destroyed the morals of a generation". Also in 1987, Jonathan Poneman provided $20,000 in funding for Sub Pop to release the debut Soundgarden single "Hunted Down"/"Nothing to Say" in July 1987, followed by the band's first EP Screaming Life that October. Poneman soon became a full partner in the label. Pavitt focused on the label's artists and repertoire aspects, while Poneman dealt with the business and legal issues. Both men decided they wanted the label to focus on "this primal rock stuff that was coming out," according to Pavitt.

=== The "Seattle sound" ===
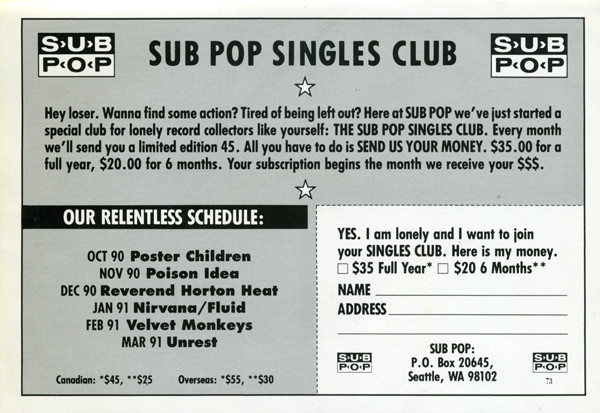
Advertising card to subscribe to Sub Pop's single club

In early 1988, Pavitt and Poneman quit their jobs to devote their full attention to Sub Pop. Raising $43,000, they incorporated on April 1, 1988. "Of course that was spent in, like, thirty days", Pavitt recalled. "We almost went bankrupt after a month". That August Sub Pop released the first single by Mudhoney, a band featuring former members of Green River. Sub Pop released the Mudhoney single "Touch Me I'm Sick" in an intentionally limited first pressing of 800 copies to create demand. The strategy was later adopted by other independent labels.

Pavitt and Poneman studied earlier independent labels ranging from Motown to SST Records and decided that virtually every successful movement in rock music had a regional basis. The pair sought to create a cohesive brand identity for Sub Pop. The label's ads promoted the label itself more than any particular band. The label also sought to market a "Seattle sound", which was accomplished with the help of producer Jack Endino, who produced 75 singles, albums, and EPs for Sub Pop between 1987 and 1989. Endino recorded cheaply and quickly; in order to operate this way, he utilized some consistent studio techniques, which gave the records a similar sound.

Endino, in a 1989 article featured in The Rocket, explains:

The sound that I hear coming from bands that are walking in my door comes from fuzzy guitars, bashing drums, screaming vocals, no keyboards, and a general loud intent. There's a scrupulous avoidance of any mainstream musical trends, and an avoidance of MIDI, or anything remotely hi-tech. I don't get people with thousand-dollar effects racks coming in.

In November 1988, Sub Pop released "Love Buzz", the debut single by Aberdeen, Washington band Nirvana, as the first entry in the Sub Pop Singles Club, a subscription service that would allow subscribers to receive singles by the label on a monthly basis by mail. At its peak in 1990, the club had two thousand subscribers. The club made Sub Pop a powerful force in the Seattle scene, and effectively made the label's name synonymous with the music of the Seattle area—much in the same way Motown Records was to Detroit—and helped to secure the label's cash flow. The original series was discontinued in 1993, followed by Singles Club V.2, launched in 1998 and discontinued in 2002.

Some commentators have argued that Sub Pop reframed the history of Seattle's music scene as part of their marketing campaign. Even in the late 1980s, the peak of grunge as a regional scene, Seattle's bands could not easily be confined to a single genre, since groups often blended musical styles and techniques, drawing, for example, on folk rock, psychedelic rock, garage rock, and pop hooks. The "Seattle sound" cultivated and marketed by Sub Pop became known as grunge, while other Seattle bands like The U-Men, who preceded Sub-Pop, became pioneers of avant garde post-punk.

Mindful that garnering the attention of the American mainstream music press was difficult for all but the largest indie label, Pavitt and Ponemen took inspiration from alternative bands like Sonic Youth, Butthole Surfers, and Dinosaur Jr. and sought to publicize the label via the British music press. In March 1989, Pavitt and Poneman flew Melody Maker journalist Everett True to Seattle to write an article on the local music scene. As Pavitt had anticipated, the British press became enamoured with Sub Pop and the grunge sound. Pavitt said, "I really felt that the Brits and the Europeans wanted to see something that was unruly and that was more of an American archetype -- something that was really primal and really drew from the roots of rock & roll, which was very American." Poneman explained the label's success: "It could have happened anywhere, but there was a lucky set of coincidences. Charles Peterson was here to document the scene, Jack Endino was here to record the scene. Bruce and I were here to exploit the scene."

By 1991, Sub Pop were in financial difficulties, leading Mudhoney and Tad to depart the label and delaying the release of The Afghan Whigs' Congregation (1992). One particularly embarrassing incident occurred when a check Sup Pop wrote to a studio to pay for Mark Lanegan's recording sessions bounced, resulting in a multi-year delay in the release of his second album Whiskey for the Holy Ghost. When Geffen Records bought Nirvana's contract from Sub Pop for $72,000, it was agreed that the former would pay the latter a percentage of any profits from the band's major label debut, Nevermind (1991). A stipulation was also implemented where selected future Nirvana studio LPs were required to carry the Sub Pop logo alongside Geffen's. The album's subsequent commercial success quickly brought Sub Pop out of their financial difficulties. Pavitt noted: "By Christmas [1991], Nevermind had sold 2 million. We went from not being able to pay our phone bill to getting a check for half a million bucks." Sales of Bleach helped keep the label going for years afterwards. The mainstream success of Nirvana also brought Poneman and Pavitt worldwide media attention as the self-stylized "creators of the grunge scene". After the suicide of Kurt Cobain and the subsequent decline of grunge, Poneman began signing acts that were "not typically Sub Pop-ian", such as 5ive Style, Combustible Edison and Eric Matthews. In 1995, the label signed a $20 million joint venture with Warner Bros. Records (which had distributed Geffen since that label was founded in 1980; after 10 years under Warner, Geffen was sold to MCA Music Entertainment Group), who acquired 49% of the label's stock.

=== Post-Pavitt ===
Poneman and Pavitt had a disagreement about the direction the label should take, with Poneman wanting the label to become larger and make more money. In 1996, unable to take the new corporate culture following the Warner partnership, Pavitt left the label and was able to spend more time with his family. The split between Pavitt and Poneman was not amicable, and they did not speak for seven years.

The label opened offices worldwide and began major investment in new artists, but without achieving great commercial success, prompting a scaling down and a return to Seattle.

In 2006, Sub Pop Records became the first Green-e certified record label. Through work with the Green-e program and the Bonneville Environmental Foundation, Sub Pop "greened" their label by purchasing enough renewable energy certificates to offset 100 percent of the electricity they use in their office, showing their commitment to putting renewable energy in the mainstream as a way consumers can take action to do something about global warming.

In early 2007, Sub Pop started a sister label by the name of Hardly Art. This label is also partially owned by Warner Music. In August 2008, Sub Pop relaunched the singles club for one year to celebrate its twentieth anniversary.

In 2009, they signed their second hip-hop group, Seattle-based Shabazz Palaces – the first being The Evil Tambourines in 1999. Ishmael Butler, one half of Shabazz Palaces and former member of jazz rap group Digable Planets became A&R for Sub Pop.

In 2016, Megan Jasper was named CEO of Sub Pop, and Gareth Smith was named director of A&R for the label's publishing company. Jasper was hired as an intern in 1989 and later became a receptionist.

== Commercial success ==
Domestically, Sub Pop has released seven albums that have been certified as platinum, for sales of over 1 million units, by the Recording Industry Association of America: Bleach by Nirvana; Give Up by The Postal Service; Oh, Inverted World and Wincing the Night Away by The Shins; The Head and the Heart by The Head and the Heart; Fleet Foxes by Fleet Foxes; and Depression Cherry by Beach House.

Ten albums released by the label have been certified gold for sales of 500,000 copies: Chutes Too Narrow by The Shins; Everything All the Time and Cease to Begin by Band of Horses; Helplessness Blues by Fleet Foxes; Our Endless Numbered Days and The Shepherd's Dog by Iron & Wine; and Flight of the Conchords by Flight of the Conchords; Let's Be Still by The Head and the Heart; and Bloom and Teen Dream by Beach House.

== Deluxe editions ==
Starting in 2008, Sub Pop has released Deluxe Editions of its top-selling albums, which features a remastered version of the album, as well as some live tracks and demos. The albums released under this were Nirvana’s Bleach, Mudhoney's Superfuzz Bigmuff, Sebadoh's Bakesale, Jason Loewenstein's Codes, The Postal Service's Give Up, and Red Red Meat's Bunny Gets Paid.

== In popular culture ==
Sub Pop, its founders, and some acts on the label were featured on season 1, episode 5 of Vice Media's Dark Side of the 90's entitled "Grunge and the Seattle Sound".

In the 2000 film High Fidelity, a Sub Pop sticker can be seen in several scenes that take place in the main character’s record store.

In David Fincher's The Killer, the central villain, played by Arliss Howard, wears a Sub Pop T-shirt.

The record label is featured in the 2026 video game Forza Horizon 6, with a dedicated radio station to the label and its current lineup of artists. KEXP DJs Abbie Gobeli and Atticus George-Andrijeski, both of whom also work for Sub Pop, serve as the in-game station's DJs.

== See also ==
- List of Sub Pop artists
- Lists of record labels

== Bibliography ==
- Azerrad, Michael. Our Band Could Be Your Life. Little, Brown and Company, 2001. ISBN 0-316-78753-1
- Furek, Maxim. "The Death Proclamation of Generation X: A Self-Fulfilling Prophesy of Goth, Grunge and Heroin, i-Universe, 2008. ISBN 978-0-595-46319-0
- Gaar, Gillian G. World Domination: The Sub Pop Records Story, BMG, RPM Series, 2018. ISBN 978-1-947-02618-6
