= Band of Horses discography =

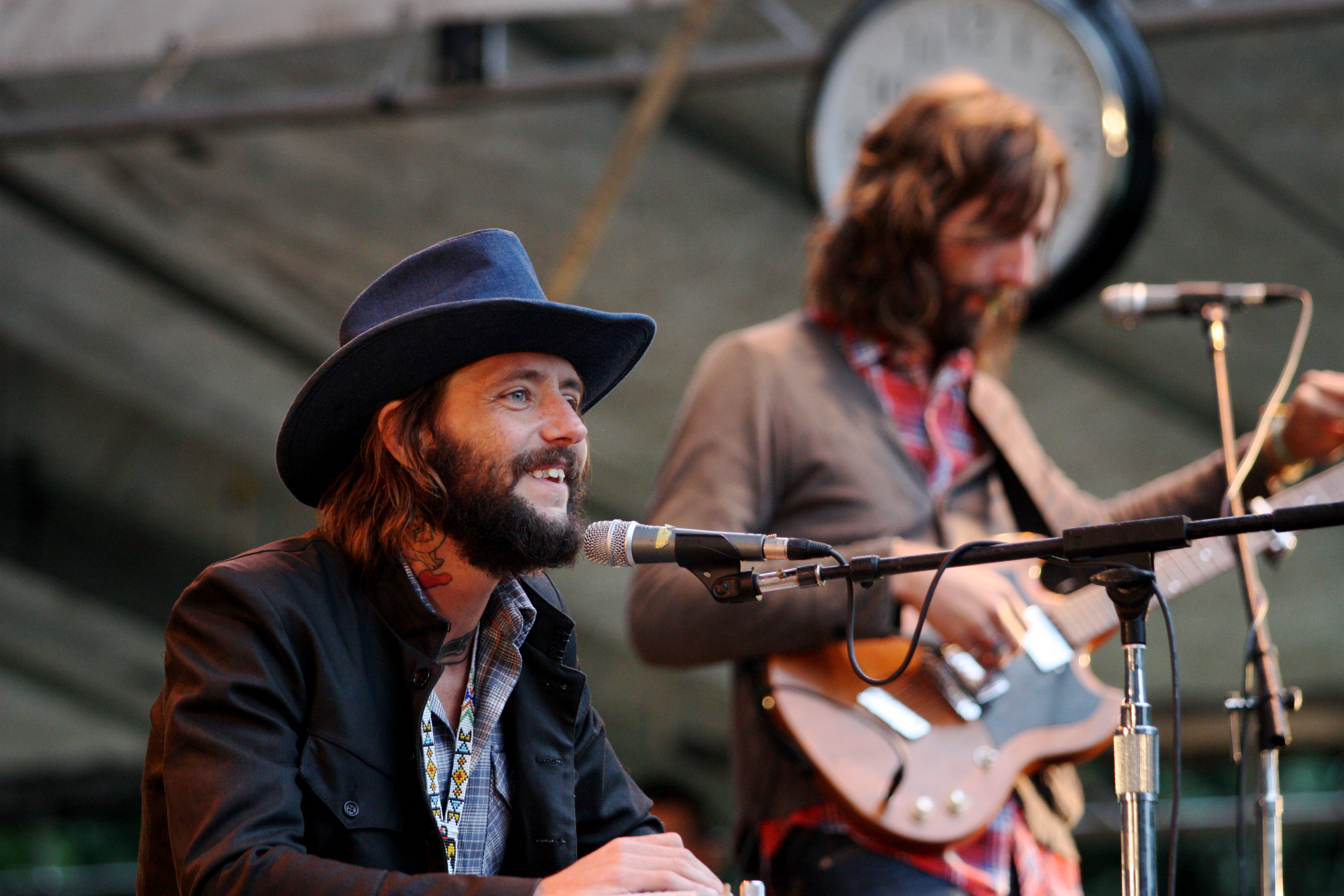
- Band of Horses at the Outside Lands Festival 2009
- Studio albums: 6
- EPs: 2
- Live albums: 1
- Singles: 14
- Other appearances: 8

The discography of American rock band Band of Horses consists of six studio albums, one live album, two extended plays (EPs), and 14 singles. Formed in 2004 in Seattle by Ben Bridwell, their self-released Tour EP (2005) was made available at shows and at Sub Pop's website. The band's debut full-length album, Everything All the Time, followed in 2006 and reached the charts in Norway and Sweden. Their second album, Cease to Begin was released in 2007 and charted at number 35 on the US Billboard 200. "Is There a Ghost", the first single from the album, peaked at number 34 on the US Alternative Songs chart and number 30 in Denmark.

Band of Horses' third album, Infinite Arms (2010), is their most commercially successful, debuting at number seven on the Billboard 200 and number 21 on the UK Albums Chart. It features the single "Laredo", which entered the US Alternative Songs and Rock Songs charts. The band released their fourth album, Mirage Rock, in 2012, and their first live album, Acoustic at the Ryman, in 2014.

== Albums ==
=== Studio albums ===
List of studio albums, with selected chart positions
Title	Album details	Peak chart positions										Certifications
Title	Album details	US	AUS	BEL (FL)	GER	NLD	NOR	SCO	SWE	SWI	UK	Certifications
Everything All the Time	Released: March 21, 2006; Label: Sub Pop; Formats: CD, LP, digital download	— (Note: Everything All the Time did not enter the US Billboard 200, but peaked at number 25 on the US Heatseekers Albums Chart.)	—	—	—	—	25	—	58	—	191	RIAA: Gold; IFPI DEN: Gold; IFPI NOR: Gold
Cease to Begin	Released: October 9, 2007; Label: Sub Pop; Formats: CD, LP, digital download	35	— (Note: Cease to Begin did not enter the Australian ARIA Albums Chart but peaked at number seven on the ARIA Hitseekers Chart.)	—	—	—	18	—	57	—	148	RIAA: Gold; BPI: Silver; IFPI DEN: Platinum; IFPI NOR: Gold
Infinite Arms	Released: May 18, 2010; Label: Columbia, Fat Possum; Formats: CD, digital download	7	19	29	88	64	2	22	5	29	21	BPI: Silver
Mirage Rock	Released: September 18, 2012; Label: Columbia; Formats: CD, digital download	13	21	27	72	55	9	14	15	35	20	
Why Are You OK	Released: June 10, 2016; Label: Interscope; Formats: CD, digital download, LP	19	22	25	72	53	20	24	33	40	37	
Things Are Great	Released: March 4, 2022; Label: BMG; Formats: CD, digital download	138	—	13	32	67	—	10	— (Note: Things Are Great did not enter the Sweden Albums Chart, but peaked at number 13 on the Sweden Physical Albums Chart.)	42	67	
"—" denotes a recording that did not chart or was not released in that territory.

=== Live albums ===
List of studio albums, with selected chart positions
Title	Album details	Peak chart positions									
Title	Album details	US	US Indie	US Rock	BEL (FL)	DEN	NLD	NOR	SCO	UK	UK Indie
Acoustic at the Ryman	Released: 2014; Label: Brown Records, Kobalt Label Services; Formats: CD, digital download, vinyl	37	6	8	52	19	69	40	89	84	15
Acoustic at the Ryman Vol. 2	Released: January 18, 2024; Label: Brown Records, Kobalt Label Services; Formats: CD, digital download, vinyl	—	—	—	—	—	—	—	—	—	—
"—" denotes a recording that did not chart or was not released in that territory.

=== Extended plays ===
List of extended plays
Title	EP details
Tour EP	Released: 2005; Label: Self-released; Formats: CD, digital download
Sonic Ranch Sessions	Released: November 23, 2012; Label: Columbia; Formats: Vinyl, 7", Limited Edition

== Singles ==
=== As lead artist ===
List of singles, with selected chart positions, showing year released and album name
Title	Year	Peak chart positions										Certifications	Album
Title	Year	US Rock	BEL (FL) Tip	CAN Rock	DEN	ICE	MEX	POL	SCO	SWE Heat	UK Sales	Certifications	Album
"The Funeral"	2006	— (Note: "The Funeral" did not enter the Hot Rock Songs chart, but peaked at number 32 on the Rock Digital Songs chart.)	—	—	—	—	—	—	—	—	—	RIAA: 2× Platinum; BPI: Gold; IFPI DEN: Gold	Everything All the Time
"The Great Salt Lake"	2006	—	—	—	—	—	—	—	—	—	—		Everything All the Time
"Is There a Ghost"	2007	— (Note: "Is There a Ghost" did not enter the Hot Rock & Alternative Songs chart, but peaked at number 34 on the Alternative Airplay chart.)	—	—	30	—	—	—	—	—	—		Cease to Begin
"No One's Gonna Love You" (original or Stockholm Version)	2008	—	—	—	22	—	—	—	73	11	52	RIAA: Platinum	Cease to Begin
"Compliments"	2010	—	—	—	—	—	—	—	—	—	—		Infinite Arms
"Laredo"	2010	41	—	—	—	—	—	—	—	—	—		Infinite Arms
"Factory"	2010	—	—	—	—	—	—	—	—	—	—		Infinite Arms
"Dilly"	2011	—	43	—	—	—	—	15	—	—	—		Infinite Arms
"Knock Knock"	2012	—	73	—	—	—	38	—	—	—	—		Mirage Rock
"Slow Cruel Hands of Time"	2012	—	68	—	—	—	—	51	—	—	—		Mirage Rock
"Feud"	2012	—	—	—	—	—	43	—	—	—	—		Mirage Rock
"Mirage Rock"	2012	—	—	—	—	—	—	—	—	—	95		Sonic Ranch Sessions
"Hang an Ornament" (with Grandaddy)	2014	—	—	—	—	—	—	—	—	—	—		Non-album single
"Casual Party"	2016	35	—	46	—	7	—	—	—	—	—		Why Are You OK
"In a Drawer"	2016	— (Note: "In A Drawer" did not enter the Hot Rock & Alternative Songs chart, but peaked at number 47 on the Rock & Alternative Airplay chart.)	— (Note: "In A Drawer" did not enter the Flanders Ultratop Top 50, but charted as an extra tip on the Flanders Ultratop Bubbling Under chart.)	—	—	—	—	—	—	—	—		Why Are You OK
"Solemn Oath"	2016	—	—	—	—	—	34	—	—	—	—		Why Are You OK
"Crutch"	2021	— (Note: "Crutch" did not enter the Hot Rock & Alternative Songs chart, but peaked at number 27 on the Rock & Alternative Airplay chart.)	—	—	—	—	—	—	—	—	—		Things Are Great
"In Need of Repair"	2021	—	—	—	—	—	—	—	—	—	—		Things Are Great
"Lights"	2022	—	—	—	—	—	—	—	—	—	—		Things Are Great
"Warning Signs"	2022	— (Note: "Warning Signs" did not enter the Hot Rock & Alternative Songs chart, but peaked at number 48 on the Rock & Alternative Airplay chart.)	—	—	—	5	—	—	—	—	—		Things Are Great
"—" denotes a recording that did not chart or was not released in that territory.

=== Split singles ===
Title	Year	Other artist(s)	Album
"Georgia" / "No One's Gonna Love You" (Note: "Georgia" and "No One's Gonna Love You" were released as a split single with "Georgia" performed by Band of Horses and "No One's Gonna Love You" performed by Cee-Lo Green.)	2010	Cee-Lo Green	Non-album single

== Other appearances ==
List of guest appearances, showing year released and album name
Title	Year	Album
"The Funeral" (Live)	2006	Live at KEXP, Volume 2
"The End's Not Near"	2006	Music From The OC: Mix 6 - Covering Our Tracks
"Plans"	2007	Friend
"Life on Earth"	2010	The Twilight Saga: Eclipse soundtrack
"Marry Song" (Live)	2011	The Bridge School Concerts: 25th Anniversary Edition
"Out in Nature"	2012	The Super Music Friends Show Album
"Slow Cruel Hands of Time" (Live)	2013	Live at the World Cafe: Volume Thirty-Five
"Dumpster World" (Live)	2013	West of Memphis soundtrack
