= Somewhere Further Than Far Away =

Studio album by Carissa's Wierd
- Released: January 8, 2027
- Studios: Hall of Justice, Seattle, Washington, U.S.
- Length: 44:41
- Label: Nettwerk
- Producer: Carissa's Wierd

Carissa's Wierd chronology
I Before E (2004)	Somewhere Further Than Far Away (2027)

Singles from Somewhere Further Than Far Away
- 1. "No One Lives Here Anymore" Released: September 11, 2026; 2. "I Don't Feel Like I Feel Right" Released: October 9, 2026; 3. "Necklaces Exploding" Released: November 13, 2026

Somewhere Further Than Far Away is the upcoming fourth studio album by American indie rock band Carissa's Wierd. It will be the band's first studio album in 25 years, following their reunion in 2025 after previously breaking up in 2003. It will be released on January 8, 2027 via Nettwerk Music Group. It will feature founding members Mat Brooke and Jenn Champion as well as returning members Sera Cahoone and Sarah Standard.

== Background ==
Carissa's Wierd formed in Tucson, Arizona in 1995 by Mat Brooke and Jenn Champion, prior to breaking up in 2003, they released three studio albums together, Ugly But Honest (1999), You Should Be at Home Here (2001), and the critically acclaimed Songs About Leaving (2002). Following their breakup in 2003, the members pursued solo careers. Prior to the 2025 reunion, there had been two previous brief reunions, one in 2010–2011 and one in 2019. The latter had four live shows planned, however, the fourth and final show was cancelled due to the COVID-19 pandemic, and would occur five years later in 2025.

The album was reportedly inspired by "a new generation of fans drawn to a handful of recent Carissa’s Wierd shows." Brooke and Champion would send each other bedroom-recorded tracks before gathering at Seattle's Hall of Justice studio to record a new studio album, spending five days on violins, drums, and mixing. The lead single "No One Lives Here Anymore" was released on September 11, 2026. Two more singles would follow, "I Don't Feel Like I Feel Right" on October 9, 2025 and "Necklaces Exploding" on November 13, 2026.

== Track listing ==
Somewhere Further Than Far Away track listing
No.	Title	Length
1.	"No One Lives Here Anymore"	3:17
2.	"Painted Hell"	4:57
3.	"There's Nowhere to Go"	2:56
4.	"Necklaces Exploding"	3:31
5.	"January"	6:48
6.	"What Has Been Done Cannot Be Undone"	2:19
7.	"Another Ugly Ending"	3:43
8.	"I Don't Feel Like I Feel Right"	3:15
9.	"Just Been Lied To (Part VI)"	3:37
10.	"Circling the Ashtray / Sleepwalking Off Rooftops"	4:34
11.	"A Place in the Sun"	2:11
12.	"Whispering Drunks"	2:17
13.	"3 Palms (Main Theme)"	1:16
Total length:		44:41

== Personnel ==
Carissa's Wierd

- Mat Brooke – vocals, guitar
- Jenn Champion – vocals, guitar
- Sarah Standard – violin
- Sera Cahoone – drums

Additional personnel

- Samuel Roson – engineering, mixing, mastering
