= Dark Hope =

Studio album by Renée Fleming
- Released: 8 June 2010
- Genre: Indie rock
- Length: 48:19
- Label: Decca Records; Cat. No.: B0014186-02
- Producer: David Kahne

Renée Fleming chronology
Verismo (2009)	Dark Hope (2010)	Poèmes (2012)

Dark Hope is a 2010 album of indie rock titles sung by operatic soprano Renée Fleming.

The album was the idea of Peter Mensch and Cliff Burnstein; after listening to Fleming's performance of "In the Pines" on Elvis Costello's TV show Spectacle, they approached Fleming and producer David Kahne. The aim was not to produce a typical crossover album, but a collection of songs sung without any hint of operatic vocal strength.

== Track listing ==
Dark Hope track listing
No.	Title	Original artist	Length
1.	"Endlessly" (from Absolution)	Muse	3:59
2.	"No One's Gonna Love You" (from Cease to Begin)	Band of Horses	3:41
3.	"Oxygen" (from Where the Humans Eat)	Willy Mason	4:15
4.	"Today" (from Surrealistic Pillow)	Jefferson Airplane	3:22
5.	"Intervention" (from Neon Bible)	Arcade Fire	4:19
6.	"With Twilight As My Guide" (from Octahedron)	The Mars Volta	5:33
7.	"Mad World" (from The Hurting)	Tears for Fears	3:53
8.	"In Your Eyes" (from So)	Peter Gabriel	5:01
9.	"Stepping Stone" (from Rockferry)	Duffy	3:26
10.	"Soul Meets Body" (from Plans)	Death Cab for Cutie	3:11
11.	"Hallelujah" (from Various Positions)	Leonard Cohen	7:39
Total length:			48:19

== Credits ==
=== Performance credits ===
- Rusty Anderson, Nick Valensi – guitar
- David Kahne – bass, guitar, keyboards
- Will Lee – bass
- Shawn Pelton – drums
- Jesse Mills, Cyrus Beroukhin – violin
- Dov Scheindlin, William Hakim – viola
- Wendy Sutter – cello
- Alexis Pia Gerlach – cello
- Amelia Ross, Sage Ross, Rachelle Fleming – background vocals
- Mike Rossi – conductor

=== Technical credits ===
- Roy Hendrickson – engineer
- David Kahne – arranger, programming, producer, engineer
- Rebecca Meek – art direction

== Charts ==
Chart performance for Dark Hope
Chart	Peak position
Austrian Albums (Ö3 Austria)	68
French Albums (SNEP)	105
Portuguese Albums (AFP)	21
Spanish Albums (Promusicae)	73
Swedish Albums (Sverigetopplistan)	59
UK Albums (OCC)	92
US Billboard 200	150
US Top Classical Albums (Billboard)	1
