= The Great Salt Lake =

Single by Band of Horses

from the album Everything All the Time
- Released: August 2006
- Recorded: Avast Studios
- Genre: Indie rock
- Length: 3:46 (radio edit); 4:45 (album version)
- Label: Sub Pop, Kids Records
- Songwriters: Ben Bridwell, Chris Early, Tim Meinig
- Producers: Band of Horses, Phil Ek

Band of Horses singles chronology
"The Funeral" (2006)	"The Great Salt Lake" (2006)	"Is There a Ghost" (2007)

"The Great Salt Lake" is the second single taken from Band of Horses' debut album Everything All the Time, which was released on March 21, 2006.

== History ==
The song was released as a single in August 2006 in the US. While the single failed to chart, it remains one of Band of Horses best known songs. It is the third most performed song by the band, after "The General Specific" and "The (Billion Day) Funeral", respectively.

The song isn't actually about the Great Salt Lake, but about Lake Murray, a reservoir in Ben Bridwell's home state of South Carolina. He explained, "A lot of the imagery is about South Carolina, combined with some incidents we heard about from some hilarious fuck-ups we knew from Salt Lake City."

An earlier version of the song was among the six lo-fi demos that appeared on the band's self-titled EP. Interest in that EP led to fellow South Carolina native Sam Beam of Iron and Wine offering Band of Horses the support slot on his tour.

== Music video ==
The music video for the song shows band members Ben Bridwell, Creighton Barrett and Rob Hampton playing in a softball match. Neither Barrett or Hampton were members of Band of Horses when the song was recorded, but joined soon after the release of Everything All the Time.

== Personnel ==
- Ben Bridwell - Vocals, guitar
- Mat Brooke - Guitar
- Chris Early - Bass guitar
- Time Meinig / Sera Cahoone - Drums
