= Laredo (Band of Horses song) =

Single by Band of Horses

from the album Infinite Arms
- Released: April 13, 2010
- Genre: Indie rock
- Length: 3:12 (album version); 3:28 (extended video version)
- Label: Brown Records/ Fat Possum/Columbia
- Songwriter: Ben Bridwell
- Producers: Band of Horses, Phil Ek

Band of Horses singles chronology
"Compliments" (2010)	"Laredo" (2010)	"Factory" (2010)

"Laredo" is the second single taken from Band of Horses' third album Infinite Arms, which was released on April 13, 2010. The song peaked #34 on the US Alternative Songs chart and #41 on the US Rock Songs chart, making it the band's third most successful single after "Casual Party" and "Is There a Ghost".

== History ==
The song was initially rarely played in concert by the band, but has become a live standard since charting.

As with several songs from Infinite Arms, "Laredo" mentions a specific location. Bridwell explained, "Anywhere I live, the region has its effects in the writing process, or anywhere that I end up writing songs, I'm sure it seeps into the bones," although he admitted, "I'm not even sure if I know what it's about, but maybe...there was a bit of a homesickness." He was partly inspired to write "Laredo" during his time in an isolated cabin in the woods of Minnesota, he said, "There was no one around and I could just really immerse myself and whining as loud as possible."

In the music video for the song, the intro is approximately twice as long as the version on Infinite Arms.

== Reception ==
The Daily World praised Bridwell's distinctive vocals and singled out "Laredo" as a stand out song on Infinite Arms. Spin magazine said, "With its midtempo stroll, crunchy Southern guitar, and Ben Bridwell's silky vocals, 'Laredo' sounds like a younger cousin of 'Weed Party' from the band's 2006 debut album, Everything All the Time."

== Personnel ==
- Benjamin Bridwell – vocals, guitars, drums, sounds, memotron
- Creighton Barret – drums, thunderdrum, percussion
- Ryan Monroe – keyboards, vocals, percussion, guitar
- Bill Reynolds – bass, tambourine, guitar, percussion, sounds
- Tyler Ramsey – guitar, vocals, percussion, keyboards, piano, theremin
