= The Funeral (Band of Horses song) =

Single by Band of Horses

from the album Everything All the Time
- Released: May 21, 2006 (US); May 21, 2007 (UK)
- Recorded: 2005; Avast Studios (Seattle, Washington)
- Genre: Indie rock; alternative rock
- Length: 5:21
- Label: Sub Pop; Kids Records
- Songwriters: Ben Bridwell; Mat Brooke; Chris Early; Tim Meinig
- Producers: Phil Ek; Band of Horses

Band of Horses singles chronology
"The Funeral" (2006)	"The Great Salt Lake" (2007)

Music video
- "The Funeral" on YouTube

"The Funeral" is a song by the American rock band Band of Horses, taken from their debut studio album, Everything All the Time (2006). The alternative rock song was written by the band members. The song was released as the debut single from the band and lead single from the album. A live version of the song appeared earlier on the band's self-titled EP, under the original name "Billion Day Funeral".

In August 2009, Pitchfork Media named "The Funeral" the 67th-greatest song of the 2000s.

== Background ==
Singer Ben Bridwell said, "The basis of The Funeral was just really the start of me whining about my aversion to social occasions and holidays. The pressure of say New Year’s being the best party night of your life, or Christmas being this forced togetherness. I was quite the pessimist in those days when I wrote the song." Bridwell compared this dread to the feeling one gets before attending a funeral.

== Music video ==
The video for "The Funeral" was directed by Matt Lenski with additional footage by Willy Lenski. The video tells the story of a man whose dog has died. Saddened by his loss, the man drowns his sorrows in alcohol. He then drives under the influence and the end of the video suggests he crashes head-on into a delivery truck. The video shows a sign for the Galway Bay Bar in Chicago and the cars in the video are all 1970s models.

== Track listing ==
1. "The Funeral" - 5:21 (plays at 33 RPM)
2. "The End's Not Near" - 3:45 (plays at 45 RPM)

== Personnel ==
- Ben Bridwell - lead vocals, electric guitar
- Mat Brooke - electric and acoustic guitar, ebow
- Chris Early - bass
- Tim Meinig / Sera Cahoone - drums

== Appearances in other media ==
=== Film ===
- Assassination of a High School President
- Boot Camp
- Fully Flared
- Love the Beast (Trailer)
- The Stepfather
- 127 Hours (Trailer)
- The Collector (Trailer)
- Teenage Dirtbag (Trailer)
- Battleship
- Love and Honor
- In the Name Of
- Let's Be Cops
- Megan Leavey

=== TV ===
- Criminal Minds (Season 2, episode 15: "Revelations")
- FlashForward (Season 1, episode 22: "Future Shock")
- Gossip Girl (Season 3, episode 22: "Last Tango, Then Paris" - Sung by Serena Ryder)
- Kyle XY (Season 2, episode 9: "Ghost In The Machine")
- Mercy (Season 1, episode 16 : "I'm Fine")
- My Life as Liz (Season 1, episode 4: "Liz's Got Talent (Part 2)" - Sung by Liz Lee)
- Numb3rs (Season 4, episode 11: "Breaking Point")
- One Tree Hill (Season 4, episode 7: "All These Things That I've Done")
- Standoff (Season 1, episode 12: "No Strings")
- How I Met Your Mother (Season 8, Episode 1: "Farhampton")
- The Night Shift (Season 1, Episode 2: "Second Chances")
- Stumptown (Season 1, Episode 15: "At All Costs: The Conrad Costas Chronicles")
- Tear Along the Dotted Line (Episode 6)
- La casa de papel (season 5, episode 9)
- Irreverent (Season 1, Episode 3: "Episode 3")
- The Best Years (Season 1, Episode 13: "Mommy Dearest")

=== Other ===
- Skate (2007 video game)
- Ford Edge (2008 television commercial)
- Danny MacAskill (YouTube video of bike trials stunts)
- Rock Band Network (Downloadable content)
- Madden NFL 18 (2017 video game)

=== Songs that sample "The Funeral" ===
- "The Prayer" by Kid Cudi
- "Comin' Up" by The Grouch & Eligh

== Certifications ==
Certifications for "The Funeral"
Region	Certification	Certified units/sales
Denmark (IFPI Danmark)	Gold	45,000^{‡}
Italy (FIMI)	Gold	50,000^{‡}
New Zealand (RMNZ)	Gold	15,000^{‡}
Spain (Promusicae)	Gold	30,000^{‡}
United Kingdom (BPI)	Gold	400,000^{‡}
United States (RIAA)	2× Platinum	2,000,000^{‡}
^{‡} Sales+streaming figures based on certification alone.
