= Factory (song) =

- Promo single CD

Single by Band of Horses

from the album Infinite Arms
- Released: April 20, 2010
- Genre: Indie rock
- Length: 4:35
- Label: Brown Records/ Fat Possum/Columbia
- Songwriter(s): Ben Bridwell
- Producer(s): Band of Horses, Phil Ek

Band of Horses singles chronology
"Laredo" (2010)	"Factory" (2010)	"Georgia" (2010)

"Factory" is the third single taken from Band of Horses' third album Infinite Arms. The song was released for free download at the band's official site in April 2010, shortly after "Compliments" and "Laredo", to help promote the upcoming release of Infinite Arms. Despite not charting, the song was generally well received and was noted for its unique use of candy referencing, with Pitchfork calling the song, "the album's string-drenched opener. Marvel as Ben Bridwell does his best to give majesty to the phrase 'snack machine.'" It's a fan-favorite, and although it's sometimes dropped during the band's sets when they're the opening act, it's almost always present during shows where they're the headliner. It was performed by the band during their appearance on Later... with Jools Holland.

== Personnel ==
- Benjamin Bridwell - vocals, guitars, drums, sounds, memotron
- Creighton Barret - drums, thunderdrum, percussion
- Ryan Monroe - keyboards, vocals, percussion, guitar
- Bill Reynolds - bass, tambourine, guitar, percussion, sounds
- Tyler Ramsey - guitar, vocals, percussion, keyboards, piano, theremin
