= Every Little Word =

Every Little Word may refer to:

- Every Little Word (album), a 1994 album by Hal Ketchum, or the title song
- "Every Little Word" (song), a 2014 song by MNEK
- "Every Little Word", a 1990 single by Flesh for Lulu
- "Every Little Word", a song by Sera Cahoone, from the 2012 album Deer Creek Canyon
