= Songs About Leaving =

Studio album by Carissa's Wierd
- Released: August 6, 2002
- Studios: The Hall of Justice, Seattle, Washington
- Genres: Indie rock; slowcore
- Length: 44:42
- Label: Sad Robot
- Producer: Chris Walla

Carissa's Wierd chronology
You Should Be at Home Here (2001)	Songs About Leaving (2002)	Scrapbook (2003)

Songs About Leaving is the third studio album by the American indie rock band Carissa's Wierd. Originally released on August 6, 2002 through Sad Robot, the album was rereleased on October 8th, 2010 through Hardly Art.

== Musical style ==
Songs About Leaving is an indie rock and slowcore album. The arrangements feature minor key guitar arpeggios, staccato piano motifs, subtle violin parts, and understated percussion, which has led music critics to refer to it as chamber pop.

Vocals are shared by Jenn Champion and Mat Brooke, whose understated performances are central to the album's tone. Their vocal interplay is often overlapped or double-tracked. Champion's quavering delivery and Brooke's subdued tone have drawn comparisons to Cat Power and Conor Oberst, respectively. At times, the songs sounded "more like demos than finished products", which a critic from Pitchfork found fitting. The album explores themes of regret, loss, rumination, and depression. It is described by Tom Scanlon at The Seattle Times as being "laced with battery-acid bitterness".

== Critical reception ==
Professional ratings
Review scores
Source	Rating
AllMusic	3/5 stars
Pitchfork	8.0/10
Sputnikmusic	4.5/5 stars

AllMusic reviewed Songs About Leaving as offering up "hauntingly poignant vignettes", stating that its "abundance of down-turned emotional muck may not be everyone's cup of tea, but it definitely stands out as something not quite so ordinary in the musical landscape". Paul Iiams from Arizona Daily Wildcat found it incredibly annoying and frustrating due to the singers' voices, despite the "pretty good" music. Pitchfork gave the album a positive review, stating that it "sounds fascinatingly hesitant", and is "all the more devastating for being the band's final act". Sputnikmusic gave the album a positive review describing the album as "a perfect metaphor for depression" and that "it makes you feel like shit, even when the music is catchy".

== Track listing ==
All songs written by Carissa's Wierd.

No.	Title	Length
1.	"You Should Be Hated Here"	2:38
2.	"Silently Leaving the Room"	3:20
3.	"So You Wanna Be a Superhero"	3:39
4.	"September Come Take This Heart Away"	6:28
5.	"Ignorant Piece of Shit"	3:15
6.	"The Piano Song"	2:04
7.	"They'll Only Miss You When You Leave"	4:46
8.	"A New Holiday (November 16th)"	1:52
9.	"Farewell to All These Rotten Teeth"	5:23
10.	"Sofisticated Fuck Princess Please Leave Me Alone"	3:08
11.	"Low Budget Slow Motion Soundtrack Song for the Leaving Scene"	5:16
12.	"(March 19th 1983) It Was Probably Green"	2:53
