= Keep in Mind Frankenstein =

Keep In Mind Frankenstein

Studio album by Grand Archives
- Released: September 15, 2009
- Genre: Indie rock
- Length: 35:34
- Label: Sub Pop
- Producer: Ben Kersten

Grand Archives chronology
The Grand Archives (2008)	Keep In Mind Frankenstein (2009)

Professional ratings
Review scores
Source	Rating
Allmusic	3/5 stars
CHARTattack	3.5/5 stars
Pitchfork Media	(5.0/10)
Under The Radar	(7/10)

Keep in Mind Frankenstein is the second full-length album by Seattle's Grand Archives.

== Track listing ==
1. "Topsy's Revenge" - 3:42
2. "Witchy Park/Tomorrow Will (Take Care Of Itself)" - 6:27
3. "Silver Among The Gold" - 3:57
4. "Oslo Novelist" - 3:51
5. "Lazy Bones" - 2:41
6. "Siren Echo Valley (Part 1)" - 2:02
7. "Left For All The Strays" - 3:17
8. "Dig That Crazy Grave" - 4:25
9. "Siren Echo Valley (Part 2)" - 2:38
10. "Willoughby" - 2:39
