= Ugly But Honest =

Studio album by Carissa's Wierd
- Released: 1999; October 12, 2010 (reissue)
- Recorded: 1996–1999
- Genres: Slowcore; midwest emo; chamber pop; slacker rock; indie folk
- Length: 60:44
- Label: Hardly Art

Carissa's Wierd chronology
Ugly But Honest (1999)	You Should Be At Home Here (2001)

Ugly But Honest is the first studio album by indie rock band Carissa's Wierd. Originally released by Brown Records in 1999, the album is a collection of songs and demos ranging from 1996 to 1999. A decade later, the album was re-released in 2010 by the American independent record label Hardly Art.

== Critical reception ==
Pitchfork critic Stephen M. Deusner believes the album "sounds less a debut by a young band and more like the work of seasoned professionals with too many shows at too many half-filled venues under its belt." The Daily of the University of Washington author Luke Whittleton states that the intimate and raw nature of Ugly But Honest quietly influenced 2000's indie-folk music as a whole.

== Track listing ==
Ugly But Honest track listing
No.	Title	Length
1.	"Heather Rhodes"	2:55
2.	"Drunk w/ the Only Saints I Know"	3:00
3.	"Lazy Eyelids"	9:11
4.	"To Be There Now"	4:49
5.	"One Night Stand"	4:31
6.	"Sitting in the Smoking Lounge of an Airport with a Broken Heart"	4:55
7.	"Blankets Stare"	3:18
8.	"Fluorescent Lights"	4:25
9.	"A Bathtile Green"	3:08
10.	"Some Days Are Better Than Others"	6:46
11.	"Alphabet on the Manhole"	14:19
Total length:		60:44
