= The Grand Archives =

Studio album by Grand Archives
- Released: February 19, 2008
- Genre: Indie rock
- Length: 37:19
- Label: Sub Pop
- Producer: Ben Kersten

Grand Archives chronology
Demo/Tour EP (2007)	The Grand Archives (2008)	Keep in Mind Frankenstein (2009)

Professional ratings
Review scores
Source	Rating
Allmusic	link
Pitchfork Media	7.8/10 link

The Grand Archives is the debut full-length album by Seattle, United States, band Grand Archives.

== Track listing ==
1. "Torn Blue Foam Couch" – 3:27
2. "Miniature Birds" – 3:33
3. "Swan Matches" – 4:17
4. "Index Moon" – 2:57
5. "George Kaminski" – 4:23
6. "A Setting Sun" – 3:43
7. "Breezy No Breezy" – 1:59
8. "Sleepdriving" – 5:20
9. "Louis Riel" – 2:29
10. "The Crime Window" – 3:44
11. "Orange Juice" – 1:32
