= No One's Gonna Love You =

2008 single by Band of Horses

Single by Band of Horses

from the album Cease to Begin
- B-side: "Am I a Good Man?"
- Released: February 25, 2008
- Recorded: Avast
- Genre: Indie rock
- Length: 3:37
- Label: Sub Pop
- Songwriters: Ben Bridwell; Rob Hampton; Creighton Barrett
- Producer: Phil Ek

Band of Horses singles chronology
| "Is There a Ghost" (2007) | "No One's Gonna Love You" (2008) | "Compliments" (2010) |

"No One's Gonna Love You"

Promotional single by Cee Lo Green

from the album The Lady Killer
- Released: July 6, 2010
- Recorded: 2010
- Genre: Indie rock, soul
- Length: 3:24
- Label: Elektra
- Songwriters: Ben Bridwell; Rob Hampton; Creighton Barrett
- Producer: Paul Epworth

"No One's Gonna Love You" is a song by American rock group Band of Horses. It was released in February 2008 as the second single from their second album, Cease to Begin. In February 2011, three years after the single's original release, the song charted in Denmark. This was due to the band's performance of the song on the Danish talkshow Det Nye Talkshow - med Anders Lund Madsen. The song reached number 22 in the Danish Charts. The song has been used in several TV programmes, such as Chuck, One Tree Hill and Numb3rs, as well as appearing in the films Zombieland and Prom.

== Personnel ==
- Ben Bridwell – lead vocals, guitar
- Rob Hampton – guitar, bass guitar
- Creighton Barrett – drums
- Ryan Monroe – keyboards

== Chart performance ==
Chart performance for "No One's Gonna Love You"
| Chart (2011) | Peak position |
|---|---|
| Denmark (Tracklisten) | 22 |
| Scottish Singles Sales (Official Charts) | 73 |
| UK Physical Singles Chart (Official Charts Company) | 52 |
| US Hot Singles Sales (Billboard) | 10 |
| Chart (2018) | Peak position |
| Sweden Heatseekers (Sverigetopplistan) | 11 |

== Certifications ==
Certifications for "No One's Gonna Love You"
| Region | Certification | Certified units/sales |
|---|---|---|
| New Zealand (RMNZ) | Gold | 15,000^{‡} |
| United States (RIAA) | Gold | 500,000^{‡} |
^{‡} Sales+streaming figures based on certification alone.

== Cee Lo Green version ==
The song was covered by American recording artist Cee Lo Green on his third studio album, The Lady Killer. The cover inspired the original artist, Band of Horses, to cover Green's song, "Georgia". Green released the first of two versions of "No One's Gonna Love You" on July 6, 2010 (see below). The single was available via digital download, as a promotional CD single and as a limited edition 7" vinyl single, which includes the Band of Horses' cover version of Green's song "Georgia" as the B-side.

Two versions of Green's song were produced and mixed by producer Paul Epworth. One version appears on the album, and a remix (titled "No One's Gonna Love You - Paul Epworth Mix") was released.

=== Music video ===
The Paul Epworth Mix was accompanied by a music video which premiered on July 6, 2010, on Green's official YouTube channel. The video is about a woman being evicted from her home and traveling across the country with her boyfriend. The video stars Jason Lee Parry and Jenny Sirney.

Also, two versions of the Paul Epworth Mix video were released - one with explicit images featuring brief nudity, and one with slight changes that omit the nudity.

=== Track listing ===
Digital download / Promotional CD single

1. "No One's Gonna Love You" (Paul Epworth Mix) – 3:24

Limited edition 7" vinyl single

1. "No One's Gonna Love You" (Paul Epworth Mix) – 3:24
2. "Georgia" (Band of Horses Version) – 3:58

== Other covers ==
- Kristina Train covered "No One's Gonna Love You" on her May 2013 album Dark Black.
- Renee Fleming covered the song on her 2010 album Dark Hope.
