= If the Ocean Gets Rough =

Album by Willy Mason

If The Ocean Gets Rough

Studio album by Willy Mason
- Released: March 5, 2007
- Genre: Folk
- Label: Virgin Records
- Producers: Chris Shaw, Doug Easley, Willy Mason

Willy Mason chronology
Where the Humans Eat (2004)	If The Ocean Gets Rough (2007)	It's Easy to Talk EP (2007)

Professional ratings
Review scores
Source	Rating
AllMusic	4/5 stars
Pitchfork Media	3.1/10
Q	4/5 stars
Rocklouder	3/5 stars
Twisted Ear	4.5/5 stars

If the Ocean Gets Rough is the second album by American singer-songwriter Willy Mason, which was released in the UK on March 5, 2007.

The album was in the UK Albums Top 40 for three weeks, peaking at number 33. The single 'Save Myself' peaked at number 42 in the UK singles chart. Follow up single 'We Can Be Strong' peaked at 52.

== Track listing ==
1. Gotta Keep Walking
2. The World That I Wanted
3. We Can Be Strong
4. Save Myself
5. I Can't Sleep
6. Riptide
7. When the River Moves On
8. If the Ocean Gets Rough
9. Simple Town
10. The End of the Race
11. When the Leaves Have Fallen
