= Where the Humans Eat =

Studio album by Willy Mason
- Released: October 12, 2004
- Recorded: Old Soul Studio
- Label: Team Love Records
- Producer: Willy Mason, Sam Mason, Tom Schick

Willy Mason chronology
Where the Humans Eat (2004)	If the Ocean Gets Rough (2007)

Professional ratings
Review scores
Source	Rating
AllMusic	3.5/5 stars
Pitchfork Media	7.0/10

Where the Humans Eat is the first full-length album released by American singer-songwriter Willy Mason. It was recorded in Catskill, New York in early May 2004. Songs were mostly recorded live, and feature Mason singing and playing guitar (adding cello, accordion, and vibraphone in the studio), and his younger brother Sam on drums. Mason wanted to capture the atmosphere of a live performance in the recordings, and tried to avoid re-recording songs: “I made a rule that we couldn’t record any of the songs in more than three takes. It allows you to make mistakes and accept those mistakes. Listening back, sometimes the wrong notes are the best parts of the song, the imperfections are what keeps it spontaneous and live-feeling."

The album's two singles, "Oxygen" and "So Long", charted on the UK Singles Chart, and the album reached No. 38 on the UK Albums Chart in 2005. The song "Oxygen" was covered by the operatic soprano Renée Fleming on her 2010 album Dark Hope.

This album is the second release of Team Love Records.

== Track listing ==
1. Gotta Keep Movin'
2. All You Can Do
3. Still a Fly
4. Where the Humans Eat
5. Fear No Pain
6. Hard Hand to Hold
7. Letter No. 1
8. Sold My Soul
9. Our Town
10. So Long
11. Oxygen
12. 21st Century Boy
