= Single Rider (album) =

Studio album by Jenn Champion
- Released: July 13, 2018
- Length: 38:38
- Label: Hardly Art

Jenn Champion chronology
Cool Choices (2014)	Single Rider (2018)

Professional ratings
Review scores
Source	Rating
AllMusic	3.5/5 stars
Pitchfork	6.8/10
PopMatters	8/10

Single Rider is a studio album by American singer-songwriter Jenn Champion. It was released in July 2018 under Hardly Art.

== Track listing ==
No.	Title	Length
1.	"O.M.G. (I'm All Over It)"	3:43
2.	"Coming for You"	3:32
3.	"You Knew"	3:13
4.	"Holding On"	4:19
5.	"The Move"	3:43
6.	"Never Giving In"	3:26
7.	"Mainline"	3:23
8.	"Time to Regulate"	3:30
9.	"Hustle"	2:54
10.	"Bleed"	3:30
11.	"Going Nowhere"	3:25
