= Georgia (Cee Lo Green song) =

2010 song by Cee Lo Green

Promotional single by Cee Lo Green

from the album The Lady Killer
- Released: May 11, 2010
- Recorded: 2010
- Genre: Hip hop soul, R&B, funk
- Length: 3:46
- Label: Elektra
- Songwriter: Thomas Callaway
- Producer: Thomas Brenneck

"Georgia"

Single by Band of Horses featuring The UGA Redcoat Marching Band
- Released: October 8, 2010
- Recorded: 2010
- Length: 3:50
- Songwriters: Thomas Callaway, Brian Burton

Band of Horses singles chronology
| "Factory" (2010) | "Georgia" (2010) | "Dilly" (2011) |

"Georgia" is the first promotional single released by American recording artist Cee Lo Green from his third studio album, The Lady Killer; however, the track appears only on the Japanese and American Digital versions of the album. The single was released on May 11, 2010 as a digital download and a limited edition 7" single. Green revealed that he wrote the song as a tribute to his home in the state of Georgia.

== Background ==
"Georgia" was first released as a free download via Green's official UK website and was packaged with the unreleased track, "Champain."

== Covers ==
Prior to the release of The Lady Killer, American rock band Band of Horses covered the song. They teamed up with the University of Georgia Redcoat Marching Band for their version of the song. Lead singer Ben Bridwell explained, "This began as a very random idea I had on my dad's patio after we watched our beloved Georgia Bulldog football team get robbed of a win at the hands of the referees and LSU last year. I knew I wanted to pay homage to my favorite team in song but didn't have any idea how to begin. Once I heard Cee Lo's "Georgia", I was immediately smitten and figured that's as good as any tribute to any state I've ever heard. Incorporating the Redcoat marching band was just the icing on the cake! This song is so nostalgic to me as my parents grew up in Atlanta and have so many family members in the great state of Georgia. It's always been a second home of sorts. We've played some great shows there as well, including our run of annual New Year's Eve shows in Atlanta from 2007-2009." Green later covered the Band Of Horses song, "No One's Gonna Love You", which he released as the second promotional single from The Lady Killer and included it on the American version of the album.

== Track listings ==
Digital Download

1. "Georgia" (Explicit Version) - 3:46

Cee-Lo Green.co.uk Download

1. "Georgia" (Explicit Version) - 3:46
2. "Champain" - 3:21

Limited Edition 7" Vinyl Single

1. "Georgia" (Explicit Version) - 3:46
2. "Georgia" (Instrumental) - 3:46
