= Cease to Begin =

Studio album by Band of Horses
- Released: October 9, 2007
- Recorded: Echo Mountain Studios, Asheville, North Carolina
- Genre: Indie rock
- Length: 34:45
- Label: Sub Pop
- Producer: Phil Ek

Band of Horses chronology
Everything All the Time (2006)	Cease to Begin (2007)	Infinite Arms (2010)

Singles from Cease to Begin
- 1. "Is There a Ghost" Released: August 28, 2007; 2. "No One's Gonna Love You" Released: February 25, 2008

Professional ratings
Aggregate scores
Source	Rating
Metacritic	78/100
Review scores
Source	Rating
AllMusic	4/5 stars
The A.V. Club	A−
Blender	4/5 stars
The Guardian	4/5 stars
NME	8/10
Pitchfork	7.7/10
Q	4/5 stars
Rolling Stone	3.5/5 stars
Spin	4/5 stars
Uncut	3/5 stars

Cease to Begin is the second album by Band of Horses, released on October 9, 2007. This album solidified the band's sound and was a critical and commercial success, peaking at number 35 on the US Billboard 200 chart. The singles "Is There a Ghost" and "No One's Gonna Love You" appear on the album.

== History ==
Following the release of their debut album, Everything All the Time, founding members Mat Brooke, Chris Early and Tim Meinig all left the band. Band leader Ben Bridwell recruited Joe Arnone (guitar and keyboards), Creighton Barrett (drums) and Rob Hampton (bass and guitar) as replacements, although Joe Arnone left the band prior to their 2007 tour. Robin Peringer (Modest Mouse - guitar), Matt Gentling (Archers of Loaf - bass) and Ryan Monroe (keyboards) joined the band for the tour, although only Monroe stayed for the recording of Cease to Begin. After the album's release he became a full band member.

The album debuted at number 35 on the U.S. Billboard 200 chart and was No. 47 on Rolling Stone's list of the Top 50 Albums of 2007. It was also a minor hit in Scandinavia, charting in Norway, Sweden and Denmark. Cease to Begin was released in Japan on July 23, 2008, by Tear Bridge Records. The Japanese version featured an enhanced video for "Is There a Ghost" plus three live bonus tracks, including a cover of Ronnie Wood's "Act Together", written by Mick Jagger and Keith Richards, which he recorded for his album, I've Got My Own Album to Do.

Ben Bridwell described the sound of Cease to Begin, "I guess the first record had some kind of country-ish leanings...I think there's maybe a little bit more of [that] feeling on it, a little more down-home...not so much indie rock."

The first track, "Is There a Ghost", was made available for download on the band's MySpace page on August 28, 2007, and made number 93 on Rolling Stone's list of the 100 Best Songs of 2007. The song became the band's first single to chart in the United States, peaking at No. 34 on the Billboard Modern Rock Tracks chart. The album's second single "No One's Gonna Love You" was featured as a free iTunes download, distributed at Starbucks locations. While not being released as a single, "Cigarettes, Wedding Bands" was featured in the tracklist of 2009 video game Guitar Hero 5.

== Track listing ==
No.	Title	Writer(s)	Length
1.	"Is There a Ghost"	Ben Bridwell, Rob Hampton, Creighton Barrett	2:59
2.	"Ode to LRC"	Bridwell, Hampton, Barrett	4:16
3.	"No One's Gonna Love You"	Bridwell, Hampton, Barrett	3:37
4.	"Detlef Schrempf"	Bridwell, Hampton, Barrett	4:28
5.	"The General Specific"	Bridwell, Hampton, Barrett, Ryan Monroe	3:07
6.	"Lamb on the Lam (In the City)"	Bridwell, Hampton, Barrett	0:50
7.	"Islands on the Coast"	Bridwell, Hampton, Barrett	3:34
8.	"Marry Song"	Bridwell, Hampton, Barrett	3:23
9.	"Cigarettes, Wedding Bands"	Bridwell, Hampton, Barrett	4:35
10.	"Window Blues"	Bridwell, Hampton, Barrett	4:01

Japan-only Bonus Tracks
No.	Title	Writer(s)	Length
11.	"No One's Gonna Love You" (Live BBC session)	Bridwell, Hampton, Barrett
12.	"Is There a Ghost" (Live BBC session)	Bridwell, Hampton, Barrett
13.	"Act Together" (Live BBC session)	Mick Jagger, Keith Richards
14.	"Is There a Ghost" (Enhanced video)	Bridwell, Hampton, Barrett

- Track 4 is named after the German basketball player Detlef Schrempf who played for Seattle SuperSonics in the 1990s, although no mention of him is made in the song's lyrics.

== Album credits ==
Band of Horses

- Ben Bridwell – lead vocals, guitar
- Rob Hampton – guitar, bass guitar
- Creighton Barrett – drums

Additional musicians

- Ryan Monroe – keyboards

Technical personnel

- Phil Ek – producer, engineer, mixer
- Jon Ashley – assistant engineer
- Julian Dreyer – assistant engineer
- Cameron Nicklaus – assistant engineer
- Dusty Summers – design
- Christopher Wilson – photography

== Singles ==
- "Is There a Ghost" (August 28, 2007)
- "No One's Gonna Love You" (February 25, 2008)

== Chart performance ==
Chart	Peak
US Billboard 200	35
UK Albums Chart	148
Danish Albums Chart	23
French Albums Chart	199
Norwegian Albums Chart	18
Swedish Albums Chart	57

== Reception ==
Cease to Begin received a 78/100 rating on Metacritic and appeared on many "Best of 2007" lists:

- Austin Chronicle, Doug Freeman, No. 1 album of 2007
- Delusions of Adequacy, No. 9 album of 2007
- Filter Magazine, No. 2 album of 2007
- The A.V. Club, No. 5 album of 2007
- Paste Magazine, No. 9 album of 2007
- Consequence of Sound, No. 39 album of 2007

== Cover versions ==
- Cee-Lo Green has recorded a cover of "No One's Gonna Love You" for his 2010 album The Lady Killer.
- Renee Fleming has recorded a cover of "No One's Gonna Love You" for her 2010 album Dark Hope.

== Certifications ==
Region	Certification	Certified units/sales
Denmark (IFPI Danmark)	Platinum	20,000^{‡}
Norway (IFPI Norway)	Gold	20,000^{*}
United Kingdom (BPI)	Silver	60,000^{‡}
United States (RIAA)	Gold	500,000^{‡}
^{*} Sales figures based on certification alone.^{‡} Sales+streaming figures based on certification alone.
