= Grand Archives =

American indie rock band

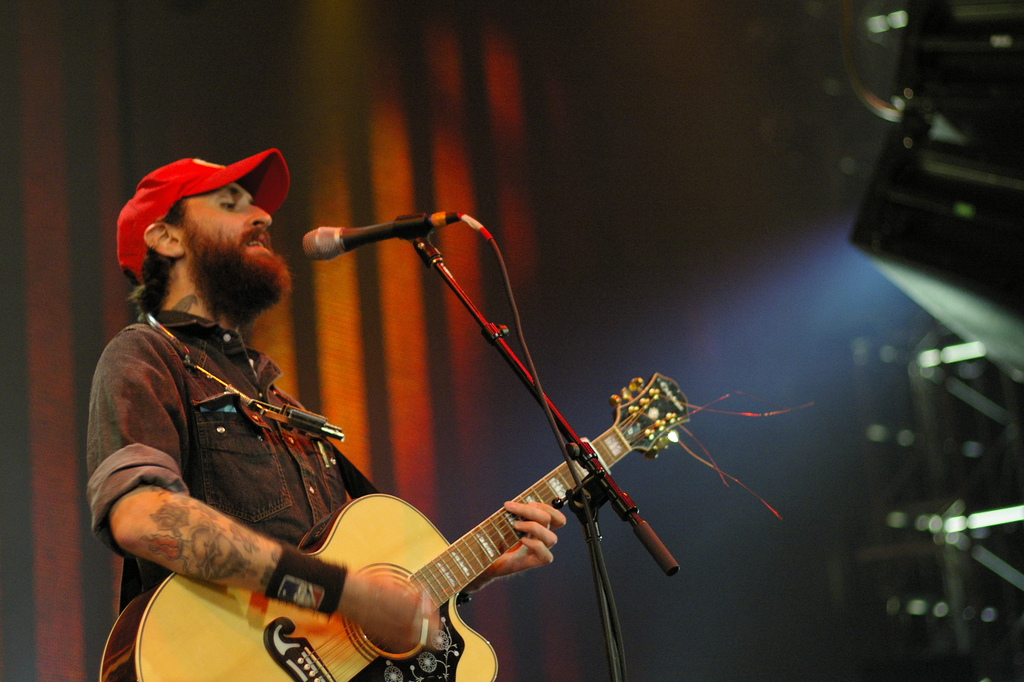
- Grand Archives at the 2007 Bumbershoot festival

Background information
- Origin: Seattle, Washington, U.S.
- Genre: Indie rock
- Years active: 2006–2012 (indefinite hiatus)
- Label: Sub Pop
- Spinoff of: Band of Horses
- Members: Mat Brooke; Jeff Montano; Curtis Hall; Thomas Wright
- Past members: Ron Lewis

Grand Archives is an American indie rock band that formed in Seattle. They were originally called Archives and are led by singer-songwriter Mat Brooke, formerly of Carissa's Wierd and Band of Horses.

== History ==
=== The Grand Archives ===
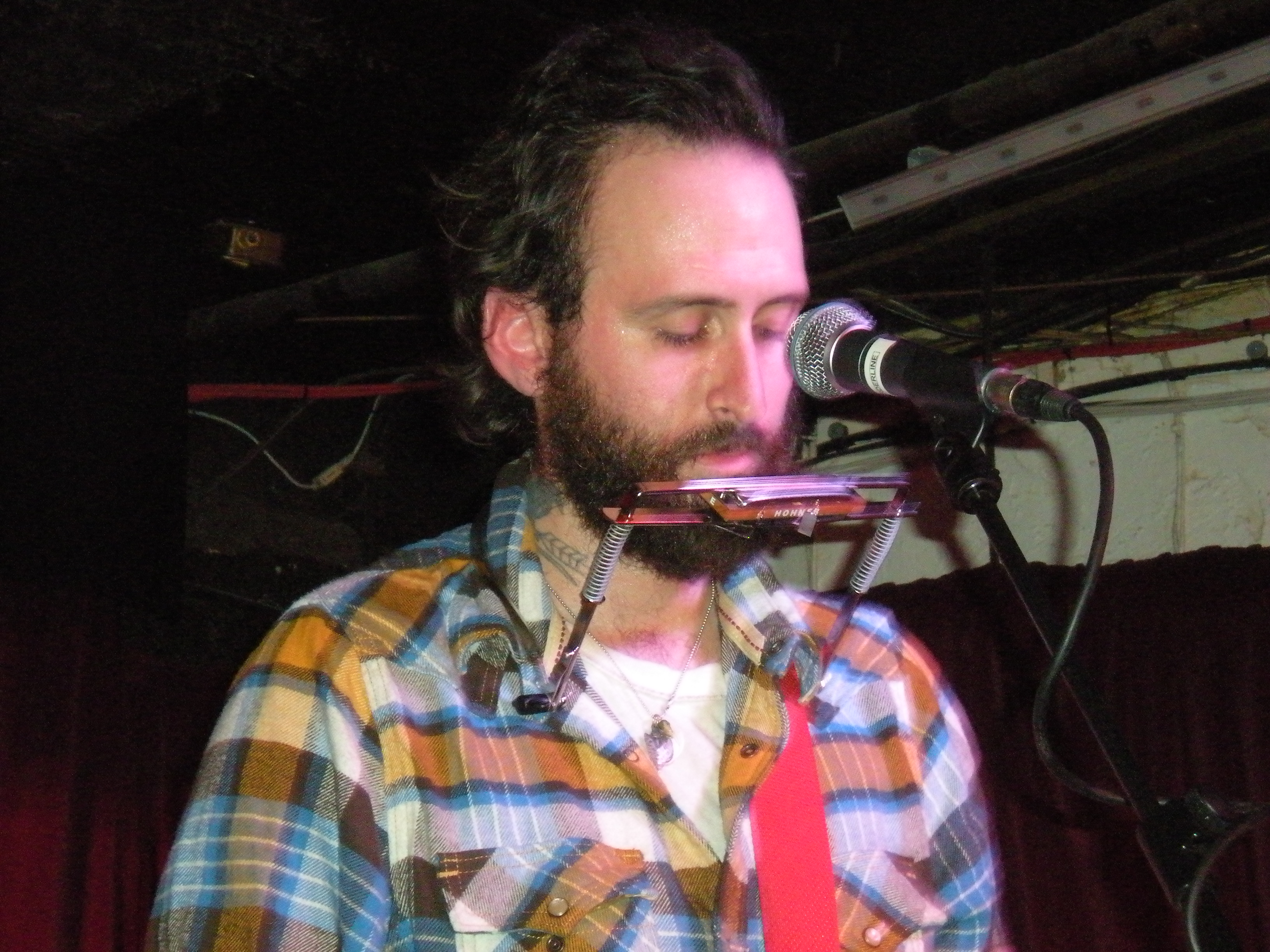
Mat Brooke at Grand Archives first UK concert on February 5, 2010

Following his departure from Band of Horses in 2006, Mat Brooke (vocals and guitar) formed a new band with Jeff Montano (bass and vocals) and Curtis Hall (drums and vocals). Ron Lewis (keyboards, guitar and vocals) was added to the lineup later in the year, and Thomas Wright (guitar and vocals) joined in early 2007.

The band emerged, under their original name, in March 2007 by posting two tracks to their MySpace page. After a show with Brooke's former Carissa's Wierd bandmate Sera Cahoone they had their track "Sleepdriving" added to Pitchfork Media's Forkcast playlist, which provided them with substantial internet exposure.

Once the band switched to their current name, Pitchfork published a more in-depth feature on the band, which discussed all four demos from their MySpace page. Soon afterwards they supported Modest Mouse on seven west-coast tour dates and subsequently signed to Sub Pop for a full-length album.

The band released The Grand Archives in February 2008 and toured the U.S. and Europe in support of it. In April 2008 the band played "Torn Blue Foam Couch" on The Late Late Show with Craig Ferguson. Ron Lewis left the band in November 2008 to tour with The Shins and rejoin The Fruit Bats.

=== Keep in Mind Frankenstein ===
Following the release of their second album, Keep in Mind Frankenstein, Grand Archives embarked on extensive tours of the United States, Canada, and Europe, playing their first UK concert on February 5, 2010. For these live shows the four-piece band was augmented by Robin Peringer (guitar & keyboards). Jason Kardong (pedal steel guitar) has also played with the band following Lewis's departure. The band toured the West Coast of the United States in July 2010 and Europe in August.

In February 2010 the band covered the song "Cupid" by Sam Cooke for Starbucks' Sweethearts compilation series.

=== Villains Demos and inactivity ===
During their tour in late 2010, Grand Archives previewed several new songs from their yet to be recorded third album. At their show at The Hoxton in London on August 2, Mat Brooke revealed that the band hoped to record the new album after they had completed the tour. On October 7, 2010, the band made demos of four songs from the new album available for free download on their official website and followed this with three more free tracks in June 2011. The title of the new album appeared to be Villains.

Grand Archives third album has, as yet, still not been recorded and the band now appear to be inactive. Brooke has concentrated on running bar / restaurants, such as The Redwood in Seattle which he co-owns with his wife Lisa.

== Band members ==
=== Members ===
- Mat Brooke (formerly of Carissa's Wierd and Band of Horses) – vocals, guitar.
- Jeff Montano (The New Mexicans) – bass, backing vocals.
- Thomas Wright (The Can't See) – guitar, backing vocals.
- Curtis Hall (The New Candidates) – drums, backing vocals.

=== Former members ===
- Ron Lewis (The Fruit Bats, Mines, Joggers, Ghost Stories) – keyboards, guitar, vocals.

=== Additional live musicians ===
- Robin Peringer (Carissa's Wierd, 764-HERO, Elliott Smith, Modest Mouse) – guitar.
- Jason Kardong (Sera Cahoone) – pedal steel.

== Discography ==
- Demo/Tour EP (2007)
- The Grand Archives (2008)
- Keep in Mind Frankenstein (2009)
- Villains Demos I & II (2010/2011 – free downloads)

== Television ==
- "Torn Blue Foam Couch" was featured in episode 10, season 8 of Scrubs.
- "Sleepdriving" was featured in episode 5, season 2 of Chuck.
- "Torn Blue Foam Couch was used in a 2012 commercial for the Washington Lottery.

== Chart history ==
Year	Album details	Peak chart positions
Year	Album details	U.S. Heatseekers
2008	The Grand Archives: Released: February 19; Label: Sub Pop	47
2009	Keep in Mind Frankenstein: Released: September 15; Label: Sub Pop	—
"—" denotes releases that did not chart
