= Is There a Ghost =

Single by Band of Horses

from the album Cease to Begin
- Released: August 28, 2007
- Recorded: Avast Studios
- Genre: Indie rock
- Length: 2:59
- Label: Sub Pop Records
- Songwriters: Ben Bridwell, Rob Hampton and Creighton Barrett
- Producer: Phil Ek

Band of Horses singles chronology
| "The Great Salt Lake" (2006) | "Is There a Ghost" (2007) | "No One's Gonna Love You" (2007) |

"Is There a Ghost" is the first single taken from Band of Horses' second album Cease to Begin, released on August 28, 2007. It reached #34 on the US Alternative Songs chart and #30 in Denmark, making it the band's most successful song until "Casual Party" reached #27 on the Alternative Songs chart in 2016.

== Background ==
The lyrics consist of two lines repeated throughout the song: "I could sleep, I could sleep. When I lived alone, Is there a ghost in my house?" According to the student newspaper The Reflector, "A simple finger-picked melody morphs into a strum-and-drum tour de force; there are layers of guitars, but not too much distortion.

In general Cease to Begin has a more Southern rock, less indie sound than Band of Horses' debut album Everything All the Time. However, "Is There a Ghost" has a strong indie feel, in contrast to the rest of Cease to Begin.

== Reception ==
Critical response to the single was generally very favourable. An article in The Scotsman singled out "Is There a Ghost" as one of the main reasons that Band of Horses have received significant international attention, however one reviewer disliked the "polished" sound of Cease to Begin, saying that, "In the switch from low to high fidelity, Band of Horses sacrifices a good deal of angst and quality." Others were more enthusiastic, with one reviewer claiming, "'Is There A Ghost' is the catchiest song with only 14 words to its credit since Pearl Jam's 'Smile'."

Rolling Stone ranked "Is There a Ghost" at #93 in its 100 best songs of 2007.

The music video for "Is There a Ghost," directed by Brian Savelson, won the 2008 MVPA Award in the Alternative category for Best Direction.

This song is featured in the racing game Forza Horizon 6, in the Sub Pop Records radio station.

== Chart performance ==
| Chart (2007) | Peak position |
|---|---|
| Denmark (Tracklisten) | 30 |

== Personnel ==
- Ben Bridwell - Lead vocals, guitar
- Rob Hampton - Guitar, bass guitar
- Creighton Barrett - Drums
- Ryan Monroe - Keyboards
