= Infinite Arms =

Studio album by Band of Horses
- Released: May 18, 2010
- Genre: Indie rock
- Length: 45:17
- Label: Brown Records/ Fat Possum/Columbia
- Producer: Band of Horses, Phil Ek

Band of Horses chronology
Cease to Begin (2007)	Infinite Arms (2010)	Mirage Rock (2012)

Singles from Infinite Arms
- 1. "Compliments" Released: April 1, 2010; 2. "Laredo" Released: April 13, 2010; 3. "Factory" Released: April 20, 2010; 4. "Dilly" Released: February 14, 2011

Infinite Arms is the third album by indie rock band Band of Horses, released on May 18, 2010, on Brown Records, Fat Possum Records and Columbia. Most of the album was recorded in Asheville, North Carolina with some overdubbing done in Los Angeles. The album was nominated for a Grammy Award in the Best Alternative Album category.

== History ==
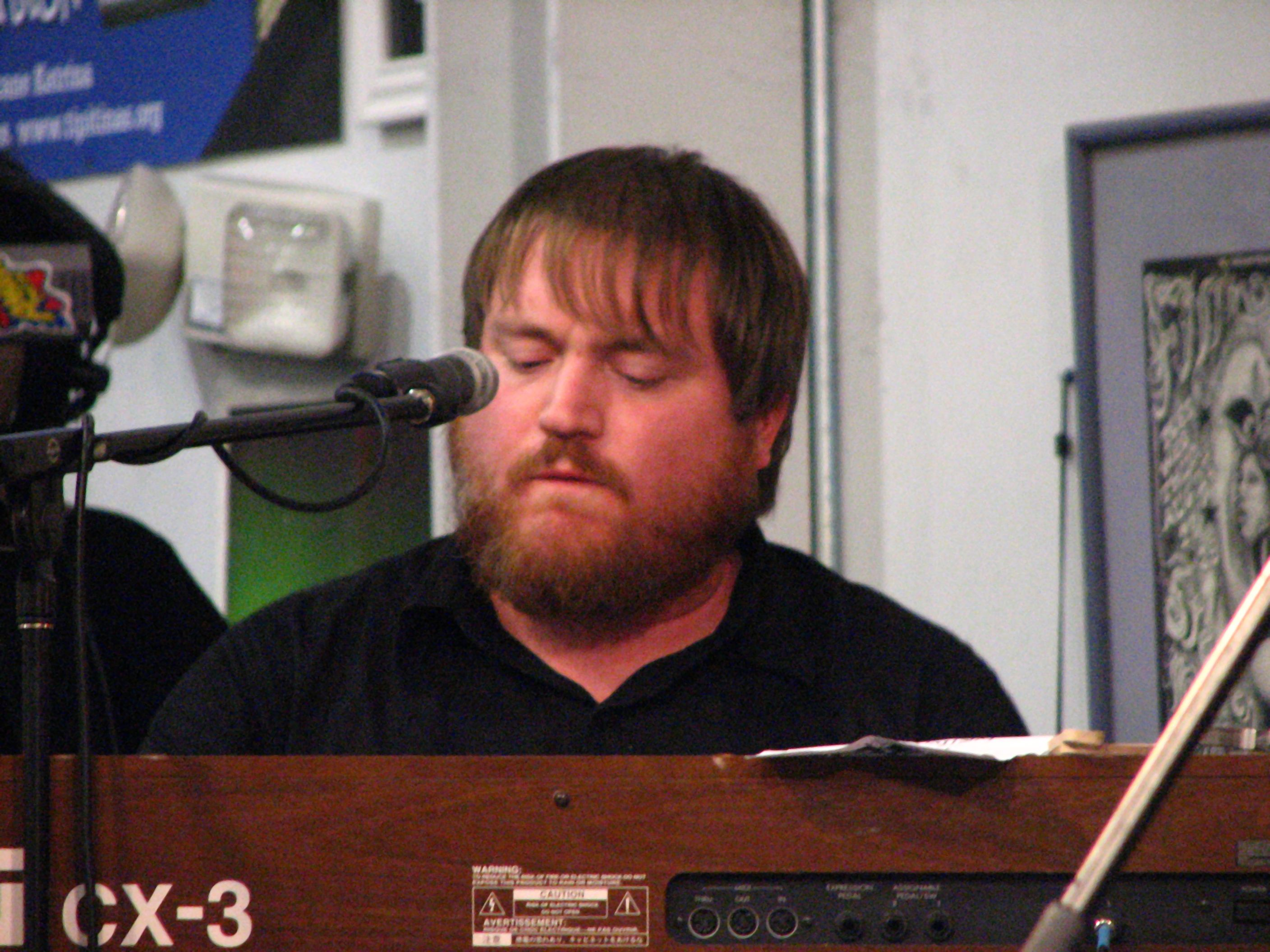
Keyboard player Ryan Monroe

Shortly after the release of Cease to Begin, keyboard player Ryan Monroe was made a permanent band member. The line-up was further expanded by the addition of Tyler Ramsey (guitar) and Bill Reynolds (bass). The new six piece band toured extensively between the releases of Cease to Begin and Infinite Arms, although Rob Hampton left the band prior to the recording of Infinite Arms.

Infinite Arms was made without assistance or funding from a record label, the band having left Sub Pop. Ben Bridwell explained why he eventually decided to have Brown Records, his own label, involved, "Because I did fund the record myself and (we) produced it ourselves, we just really wanted to make sure that we can have our hands in the pie." Several of the tracks were written by Ben Bridwell whilst staying in a cabin in Minnesota near the Canada–US border.

Bridwell explained why he had said that this was the "first" Band of Horses album, "It's the first time the line-up hasn't been this revolving door. With this record it's a real band that I'm part of. No one's going anywhere, everyone's contributing to the songwriting process..."

The track "Blue Beard" features drums by Bridwell, the first time he has played drums on a record since he was in Carissa's Wierd, Bridwell explained, "I didn’t even mean to be playing drums on that song. We all took a stab at it. The song wasn’t developing right. I was the last one to go for it and it ended up being the one." "Evening Kitchen" was written by guitarist Tyler Ramsey and features him sharing lead vocals with Bridwell, while "Older" is written and sung by keyboard player Ryan Monroe. The first single taken from the album is "Compliments" and its official music video was presented on the band's website in April 2010.

== Critical reception ==
Professional ratings
Aggregate scores
Source	Rating
Metacritic	69/100
Review scores
Source	Rating
AllMusic	4/5 stars
Clash	8/10
Entertainment Weekly	A−
Pitchfork Media	5.3/10
Q	4/5 stars
Rolling Stone	3.5/5 stars
Slant Magazine	3/5 stars
Spin	4/5 stars
Sputnikmusic	3.5/5
Uncut	4/5 stars

Reviews of the album have been generally favourable, it has an overall rating of 69 out of 100 from 31 reviews, on the Metacritic website. Q magazine gave Infinite Arms a 4/5 rating and described it as "The next Great Americana Album." They noted the influence of Neil Young and drew parallels with "The Great American Novel" in literature. Q concluded by saying that, "For all the restlessness of the creative process...this is a strangely domestic affair."

== Commercial performance ==
Infinite Arms proved a major international success for Band of Horses, performing well in charts in Europe, Australasia and North America, reaching the top 10 in the US, Canada, Denmark, Greece, Norway and Sweden.

The album sold 73,000 units in first three weeks in United States. As of September 2012, the album has sold 202,000 copies in United States.

== Track listing ==
No.	Title	Writer(s)	Length
1.	"Factory"	Ben Bridwell	4:35
2.	"Compliments"	Bridwell	3:28
3.	"Laredo"	Bridwell	3:12
4.	"Blue Beard"	Band of Horses	3:22
5.	"On My Way Back Home"	Bridwell	3:31
6.	"Infinite Arms"	Bridwell	4:08
7.	"Dilly"	Bridwell, Tyler Ramsey	3:31
8.	"Evening Kitchen"	Ramsey	3:57
9.	"Older"	Ryan Monroe	3:28
10.	"For Annabelle"	Bridwell, Ramsey	3:06
11.	"NW Apt."	Bridwell	3:01
12.	"Neighbor"	Bridwell	5:58

== Personnel ==
Band of Horses

- Benjamin Bridwell – vocals, guitars, drums, sounds, memotron
- Creighton Barrett – drums, thunderdrum, percussion
- Ryan Monroe – keyboards, vocals, percussion, guitar
- Bill Reynolds – bass, tambourine, guitar, percussion, sounds
- Tyler Ramsey – guitar, vocals, percussion, keyboards, piano, theremin

Guest musicians

- Jay Widenhouse – trumpet on "Factory"
- Dylan Huber – trumpet #2 on "Factory"
- Dave Wilkens – trombone on "Factory"
- Clint Fore – tuba on "Factory"
- Lauren Brown – strings on "Factory"

Production

- Band of Horses – production
- Phil Ek – additional production
- Danny Kadar – engineer (Echo Mountain Recording)
- Bill Reynolds – engineer (Echo Mountain Recording, Perfect Sound Studios)
- Jason Donaghy – engineer (Perfect Sound Studios)
- Benjamin Bridwell – engineer (Perfect Sound Studios)
- Mimi Audia Parker – engineer (East West Studios)
- Dave Sardy – mixing
- Ryan Castle – mix engineer
- Stephen Marcussen – mastering

== Charts ==
Chart	Peak position
Australian Albums Chart	19
Belgian Flanders Albums Chart	29
Belgian Wallonia Albums Chart	83
Canadian Albums Chart	7
Danish Albums Chart	4
Dutch Albums Chart	64
Finnish Albums Chart	26
French Albums Chart	91
German Albums Chart	88
Greek Albums Chart	4
Irish Albums Chart	21
New Zealand Albums Chart	16
Norwegian Albums Chart	2
Swedish Albums Chart	5
Swiss Albums Chart	29
UK Albums Chart	21
US Billboard 200	7
