= Deer Creek Canyon =

Studio album by Sera Cahoone
- Released: September 25, 2012
- Recorded: Bear Creek Studio – Woodinville, Washington
- Genre: Singer-songwriter, Americana
- Length: 39:43
- Label: Sub Pop Records
- Producer: Thom Monahan

Sera Cahoone chronology
Only as the Day Is Long (2008)	Deer Creek Canyon (2012)

Deer Creek Canyon is the third studio album by singer-songwriter Sera Cahoone, released September 25, 2012 on Sub Pop Records.

== Track list ==
1. Worry All Your Life
2. Deer Creek Canyon
3. Naked
4. Nervous Wreck
5. And We Still Move
6. Every Little Word
7. One to Blame
8. Rumpshaker
9. Shakin' Hands
10. Anyway You Like
11. Here With Me
12. Oh My

== Personnel ==
- Sera Cahoone – Guitar, Vocals
- Jeff Fielder – Banjo, Guitar, Vocals
- Jonas Haskins – Bass
- Jason Kardong – Pedal steel guitar
- Jason Merculief – Drums
