= Dilly (song) =

Single by Band of Horses

from the album Infinite Arms
- B-side: "Georgia"
- Released: February 14, 2011
- Genre: Indie rock
- Length: 3:31
- Label: Brown Records/ Fat Possum/Columbia
- Songwriter(s): Ben Bridwell, Tyler Ramsey
- Producer(s): Band of Horses, Phil Ek

Band of Horses singles chronology
"Georgia" (2010)	"Dilly" (2011)

"Dilly" is the fourth single taken from Band of Horses' third album Infinite Arms. The song peaked #93 on the Belgian Singles chart.

== History ==
Guitarist Tyler Ramsey came up with the song while staying in a cabin in North Carolina. He originally recorded it while playing the ukulele and a "little tiny keyboard". The demo recording was sent to Ben Bridwell who liked it and added his contribution to the song. There was an unusual tuning between the keyboard and ukulele that allowed Ramsey to come up with the song's melody.

On November 16, 2010, Band of Horses released a video for "Dilly". Previous videos for songs from Infinite Arms had been collections of still photographs by the band's longtime collaborator Christoper Wilson, merged to make movies. The "Dilly" video was filmed in the Mojave Desert by director Philip Andelman and was exclusively premiered on the movie website IMDb. The video features the exploits of a trouble-making motorcycle gang and includes surreal sequences of the gang dancing in formation, as well as them killing people by shooting them with nothing more than a pointed finger. The collaboration with IMDb represented the first occasion that the website has premiered a music video.

== Reception ==
Addict Music criticized the song for being "corny" in comparison to other songs from Infinite Arms. Chron recognized the band's focus on the track's vocal arrangements, while The New York Times recognized the influence of "1970s soft-rock folkies America." The Seattle Post-Intelligencer singled "Dilly" out as the best song from Infinite Arms and correctly predicted that it would be a future single.

== Personnel ==
- Ben Bridwell - vocals, guitars, drums, sounds, memotron
- Creighton Barret - drums, thunderdrum, percussion
- Ryan Monroe - keyboards, vocals, percussion, guitar
- Bill Reynolds - bass, tambourine, guitar, percussion, sounds
- Tyler Ramsey - guitar, vocals, percussion, keyboards, piano, theremin
