= Ex Vatican Stradivarius =

Cello

The Ex Vatican Stradivarius is a cello crafted circa 1620 by Nicola Amati, master to Antonio Stradivari. The instrument was originally crafted as a viola da gamba and converted into a cello by Stradivari. The filigree and paintings on the front and back of the cello were added in the 19th century by French luthier Georges Chanot. The front depicts two angels, one on either side of the neck; one is playing a harp and the other is playing a tambourine. The back side of the cello shows a Vatican flag and papal hat, flanked by two dolphins.
