= Only as the Day Is Long =

Studio album by Sera Cahoone
- Released: March 18, 2008
- Genre: Singer-songwriter, Americana
- Length: 38:37
- Label: Sub Pop Records
- Producer: Zack Reinig

Sera Cahoone chronology
| Sera Cahoone (2006) | ''Only as the Day Is Long'' (2008) | Deer Creek Canyon (2012) |

Professional ratings
Review scores
| Source | Rating |
|---|---|
| AllMusic | 4/5 stars |
| Pitchfork | 7.0/10 |
| PopMatters | 6/10 stars |

Only as the Day Is Long is the second album by singer-songwriter Sera Cahoone, released March 18, 2008, on Sub Pop Records.

== Track list ==
1. "You Might as Well" – 3:12
2. "Baker Lake" – 4:09
3. "Only as the Day Is Long" – 3:56
4. "Runnin' Your Way" – 3:24
5. "Shitty Hotel" – 3:56
6. "You're Not Broken" – 5:40
7. "The Colder the Air" – 3:36
8. "Tryin'" – 3:09
9. "Happy When I'm Gone" – 3:20
10. "Seven Hours Later" – 4:15

== Personnel ==
- Sera Cahoone – guitar, vocals
- Jeff Fielder – banjo, dobro, guitar, vocals
- Jonas Haskins – bass guitar
- Jason Kardong – pedal steel guitar
- Jason Merculief – drums
