= Jenn Champion =

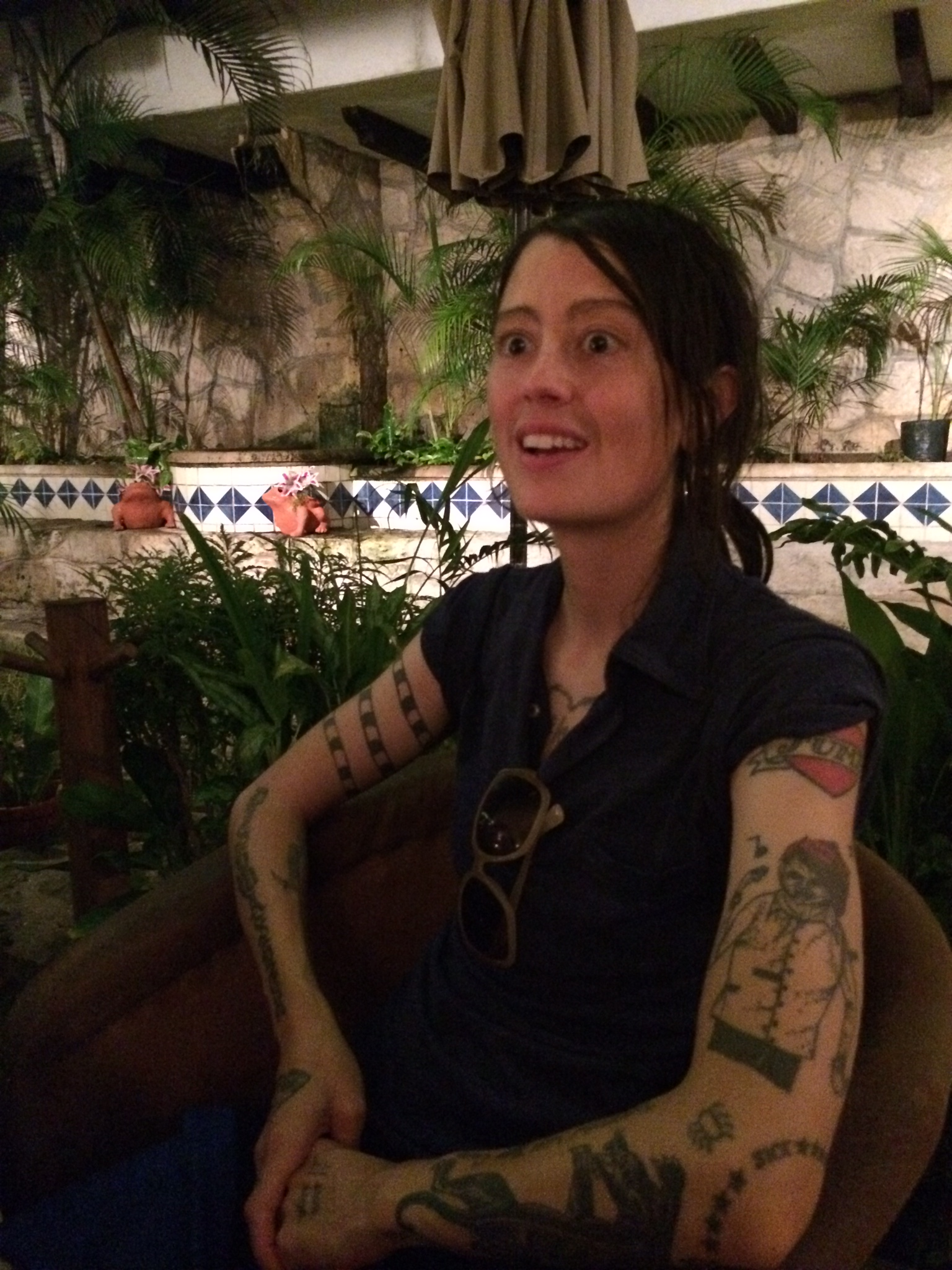
- Champion in Mexico, 2014.

Background information
- Also known as: Jenn Champion, Jenn Ghetto, S
- Born: Jennifer Hays; March 1, 1977 (age 49)
- Occupations: Singer, songwriter, guitarist
- Instruments: Vocals, guitar, piano
- Years active: 1999–present
- Labels: Brown; Hardly Art; Sad Robot; Suicide Squeeze
- Formerly of: Carissa's Wierd

Jennifer Hays, (born March 1, 1977), known professionally as Jenn Champion, is an American singer-songwriter and guitarist. From 1995 to 2003, she was a vocalist in the band Carissa's Wierd. Since 2001, she has also released solo albums under the name S. Until 2015, she went by the moniker Jenn Ghetto.

== Early life ==
Born Jennifer Hays on March 1, 1977, Champion grew up in Tucson, Arizona where, in the mid-1990s, she worked selling pizza with future bandmates Ben Bridwell and Mat Brooke. In 1997 the trio moved to Olympia, Washington for a year before moving to Seattle.

== Carissa's Wierd ==
In Seattle, Champion and Brooke formed Carissa's Wierd, who released three studio albums, the first two on Bridwell's Brown Records label. The band broke up in 2003 and since then three compilation albums have been released. Carissa's Wierd reformed for a one off show in Seattle on July 9, 2010 to promote their "best of" album, They'll Only Miss You When You Leave: Songs 1996–2003, which was released by Hardly Art Records on July 13, 2010.

In July 2010, Mat Brooke announced that he and Champion had bought the rights to Carissa's Wierd's back catalogue from Sad Robot Records. He said, "Me and Jenn have been working for a while to buy back the rights to all of our records and we finally were able to get them all back." This should allow all of Carissa's Wierd's albums to be re-released soon.

== S ==
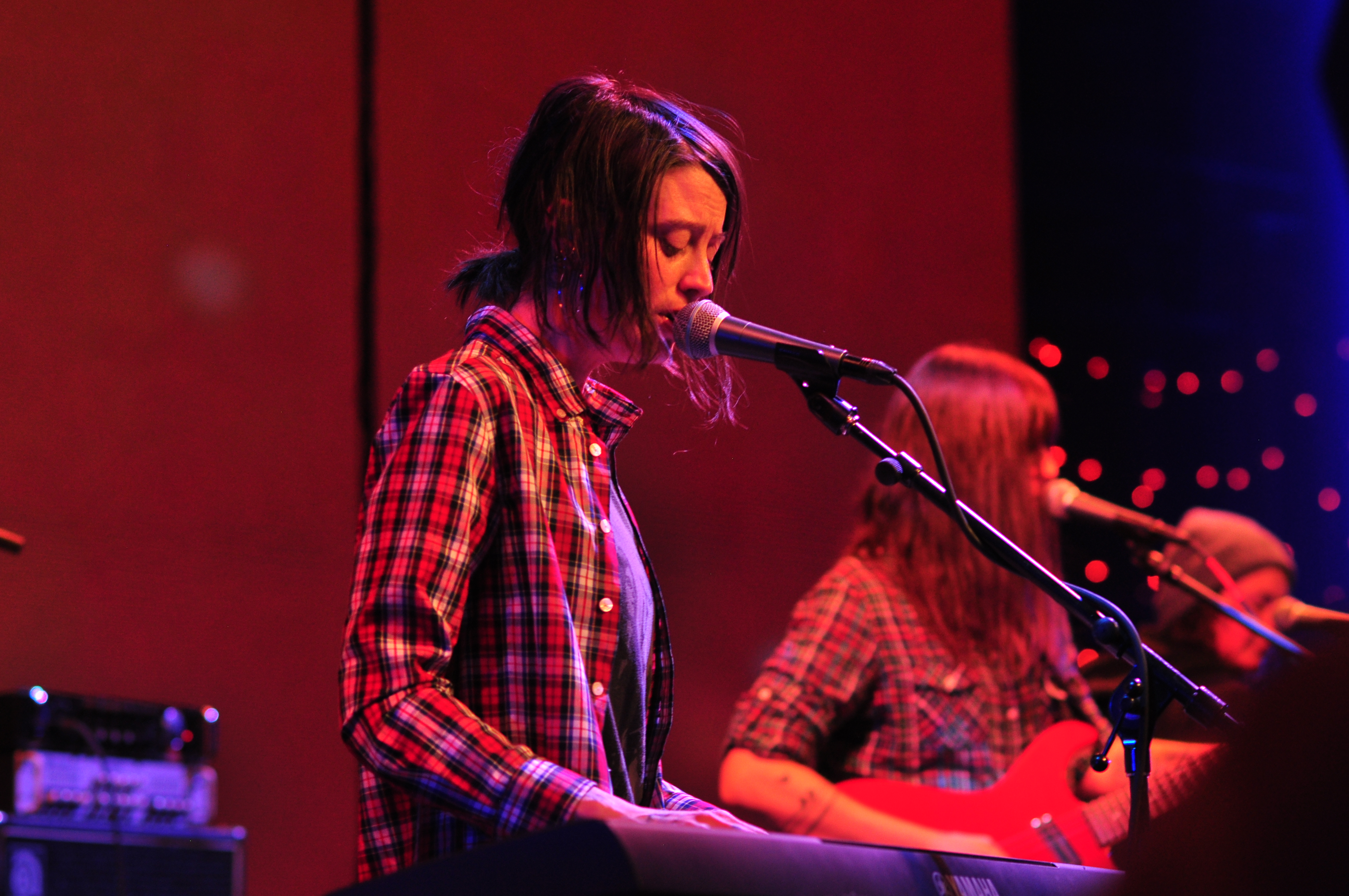
Champion performing as "S" at the EMP Pop Conference, 2015

Champion has recorded four solo albums under the name S. Her songs are usually recorded in her bedroom and feature only vocals and guitar. 2010's I'm Not As Good at It As You featured eleven songs recorded on an 8 track machine between 2006 and 2008, along with "Wait", the album's opening track, which features her former Carissa's Wierd bandmates Mat Brooke (ukulele & banjo) and Sarah Standard (violin). Champion's most recent album, Cool Choices, was produced by former Death Cab For Cutie guitarist Chris Walla and was released on Hardly Art Records in September 2014.

== Personal life ==
On September 8, 2015, Champion changed her stage name from Jenn Ghetto to Jenn Champion, citing the potential offensiveness and racially charged usage of the word "ghetto".

Champion is queer and has been out for her entire career. She has been married to her wife, journalist Arwen Nicks, since 2017.

== Discography ==
=== Solo albums (recorded under the name "S" or Jenn Champion) ===
- Sadstyle – Brown Records (2001)
- Puking and Crying – Suicide Squeeze Records (2004)
- I'm Not as Good at It As You – Own Records (2010)
- Cool Choices – Hardly Art (2014)
- Single Rider – Hardly Art (2018)
- Last Night of Sadness – Self released (2023)

=== With Carissa's Wierd ===
- Ugly But Honest: 1996–1999 – Brown Records (1999)
- You Should Be at Home Here – Brown Records (2001)
- Songs About Leaving – Sad Robot Records (2002)
- Scrapbook (2003)
- I Before E – Sad Robot Records (2004)
- They'll Only Miss You When You Leave: Songs 1996–2003 – Hardly Art (2010)
