= Compliments (Band of Horses song) =

Single by Band of Horses

from the album Infinite Arms
- Released: April 1, 2010
- Genre: Indie rock
- Length: 3:28
- Label: Brown Records/ Fat Possum/Columbia
- Songwriter: Bridwell
- Producers: Band of Horses, Phil Ek

Band of Horses singles chronology
"No One's Gonna Love You" (2008)	"Compliments" (2010)	"Laredo" (2010)

"Compliments" is the first single from Band of Horses' third album Infinite Arms, which was released on April 1, 2010. It failed to chart, but was a radio hit, particularly in Seattle, WA where the band formed.

== Music video ==
The release of "Compliments" was accompanied by a music video that "features lots of nature-y photos", which was compared to the end of Michael Jackson's "Black or White" video.

== Reception ==
The Seattle Times said that "Compliments" "has a faint whisper of country-disco" in a generally negative review of Infinite Arms. However, The Daily World said that "Compliments" was one of the stand-out tracks on Infinite Arms.

== Personnel ==
- Benjamin Bridwell - vocals, guitars, drums, sounds, memotron
- Creighton Barret - drums, thunder drum, percussion
- Ryan Monroe - keyboards, vocals, percussion, guitar
- Bill Reynolds - bass, tambourine, guitar, percussion, sounds
- Tyler Ramsey - guitar, vocals, percussion, keyboards, piano, theremin
