= Willy Mason =

American singer-songwriter (born 1984)

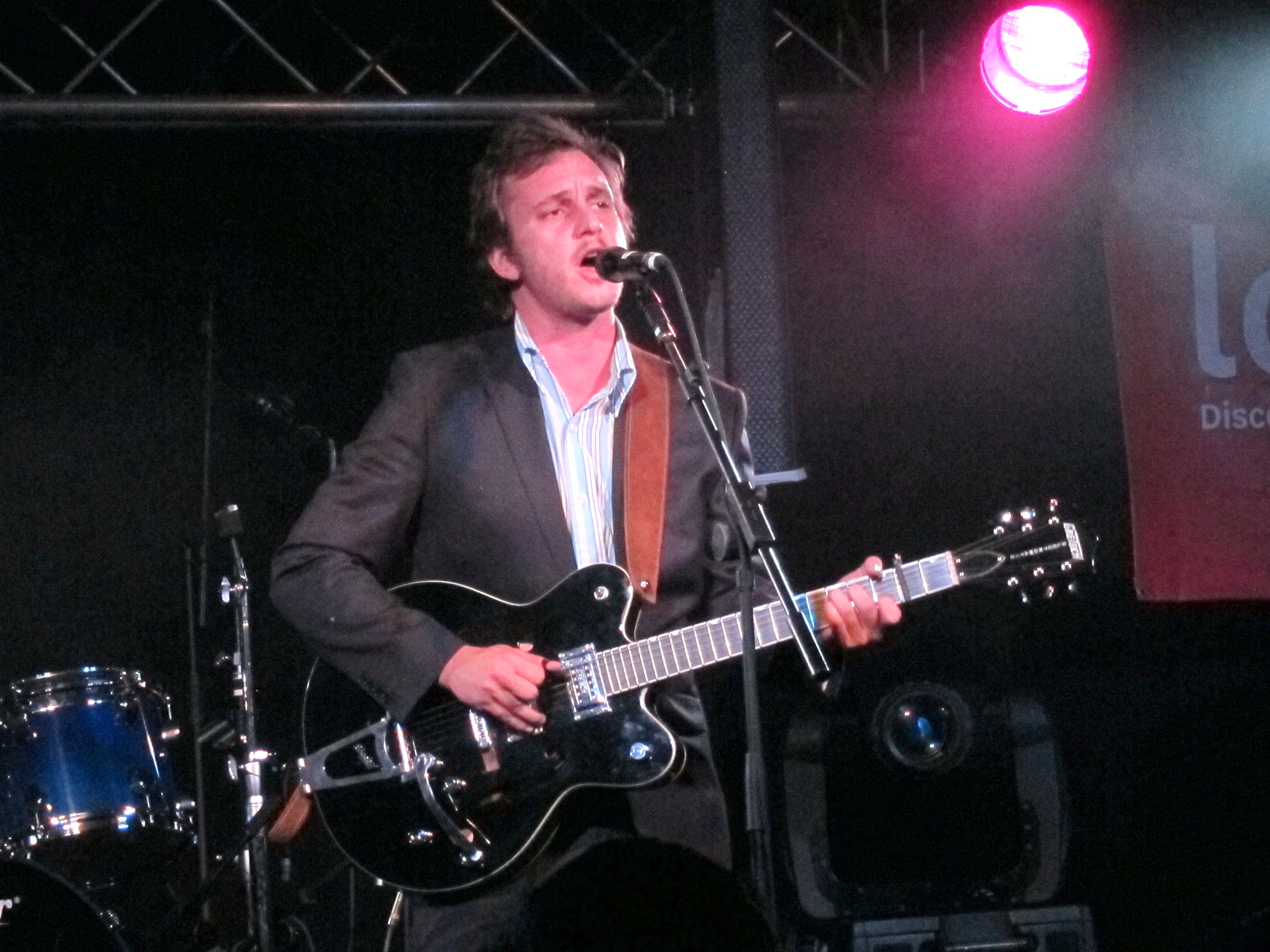

Background information
- Born: November 21, 1984 (age 41); New York City, United States
- Origin: Martha's Vineyard, Massachusetts, United States
- Genres: Folk; blues; country
- Occupations: Singer-songwriter; musician
- Instruments: Vocals; guitar
- Years active: 2004–present
- Labels: Astralwerks; EMI; Grandma's Basement; Team Love; Virgin; Fiction
- Spouse: Marciana Jones
- Website: willymasonmusic.com

Willy Mason (born November 21, 1984) is an American singer-songwriter. He grew up on Martha’s Vineyard in a musical family and began performing and recording in the early 2000s. Mason has performed in the United Kingdom and later toured internationally as both a solo artist and collaborator.

== Early life and education ==
Mason was born in White Plains, New York, the son of Jemima James and Michael Mason, both songwriters. Mason is a direct descendant of the 19th-century philosopher William James.

When Mason was five, he and his family moved from Tarrytown, New York to West Tisbury, Massachusetts, on the island of Martha's Vineyard.

He attended Chilmark Elementary School through 5th grade, West Tisbury Elementary School and Martha's Vineyard Regional High School, where he participated in several local bands such as Keep Thinking, Cultivation, and Slow Leslie. He also was in the MVRHS Minnesingers and performed in musical theater productions.

== Career ==
Mason's first commercial release was a five-track extended-play album G-Ma's Basement EP. This included solo acoustic recordings of "Live It Up", "Hard Hand to Hold", "Waiter at the Station", "Not Lie Down" and "Oxygen". The album was sold during 2004 live appearances and on the internet.

Mason's popularity rose after Sean Foley, an associate of musician Conor Oberst, discovered his music on a local Martha's Vineyard radio broadcast. Oberst would soon sign Mason to his new record label, Team Love Records and in the summer of 2004, Mason and his brother Sam traveled to Old Soul Studios in the Catskill Mountains, New York, to record Where the Humans Eat. Recording sessions were mostly live, in no more than three takes, featuring Willy Mason's guitar and vocals, and Sam Mason (director) on the drums. Minimal overdubs of guitar, bass and other instruments were added later. The album was released in the U.S. in October 2004, and by Virgin Records in the United Kingdom in February 2005. The album and its singles ("Oxygen" and "So Long"), charted in the UK Singles Chart and Albums Chart in 2005.

After many live appearances throughout 2004 and 2005, culminating with a performance at the Glastonbury Festival, Mason took time off and returned to his family's home on Martha's Vineyard. He began writing new songs and put a band together, featuring Nina Violet on viola and backing vocals, and Zak Borden on mandolin. In early 2006, they began touring the U.S. and Europe, along with other musicians. He supported Beth Orton, Death Cab For Cutie, Radiohead, KT Tunstall and Sondre Lerche.

Mason released his second album, If the Ocean Gets Rough, in March 2007. The same year, he also provided vocals for the track "Battle Scars" on the album We Are the Night (2007) by The Chemical Brothers. The song "Pickup Truck", recorded live at Aboveground Records in Edgartown, Massachusetts, is included on Radio Waves, Vol. 1, a compilation album of music from Martha's Vineyard, and was released on June 29, 2007, to help purchase transmitting equipment for WVVY-LP, a new community radio station. A live set at the Austin City Limits festival was also released in 2007.

Mason also sang on two songs on the album Hawk (2010) by Isobel Campbell and Mark Lanegan. He also featured in "No Room For Doubt", from Lianne La Havas's EP "Lost & Found" (and subsequently her debut album Is Your Love Big Enough?), which was released on October 21, 2011 on the Labour of Love label.

He toured small venues in England, Scotland, Wales and Ireland in 2011, and during the tour he recorded a live session at 80 Hertz Studios in The Sharp Project, Manchester. The single "We Can Be Strong" was featured in the series finale of the British sitcom Fresh Meat in late 2011.

On September 21, 2012, Mason announced the release of his third album Carry On. It was to be released on December 3, and would be his first album released on Fiction Records. The record was produced by Dan Carey. To accompany the album Mason played a sold-out tour of the UK in the first week of December. In November 2012, Mason toured with Ben Howard as a supporting act. He also toured Australia in October 2012 with Mumford and Sons and Edward Sharpe and the Magnetic Zeros. He performed at Mumford and Sons' Gentlemen of the Road festivals across North America in 2013. An EP Don't Stop Now was released on Communion Records in the US on January 14, 2013, supported by a four-week tour. Communion Records released Carry On in the US in 2013.

On February 5, 2013, Mason and Brendan Benson put to tape Upstairs at United Vol. 7. Benson produced, assembled, and conducted a group of great musicians who recorded in the space upstairs at United Record Pressing with seven songs all written by Mason's folk artist parents Jemima James and Michael Mason.

In September 2015, Mason toured Australia as a member of the ensemble cast of "A State of Grace", a themed concert featuring the music of Tim and Jeff Buckley. Later in the year he provided vocals on Jamie Woon's single Celebration from his album Making Time.

In September 2016, Mason opened a WUMB concert at the Strand Theatre in Oak Bluffs, performing a set of original songs before being joined onstage by his wife, Marciana Jones.

In December 2016, Mason performed at a CD release event at The Ritz in Oak Bluffs, appearing alongside Jemima James and other Island musicians.

In May 2017, Mason toured South Africa, performing in Johannesburg and Cape Town as part of a weekend lineup that included Nakhane Toure, Jamie Lee Sexton, Mark Fransman, and other local artists.

In June 2017, Mason performed at the Lerwick Legion in Shetland, with Arthur Nicholson as support.

In July 2017, Mason collaborated with Bulgarian vocalist Eugenia Georgieva on a new choral arrangement of We Can Be Strong for the Voices Now festival at London’s Roundhouse.

In early 2018, Mason announced a nine-date tour of Ireland, with performances scheduled in Cork, Galway, Navan, Bangor, Derry, Dublin, and Limerick.

In 2019, BBC Radio 6 Music broadcast a session recorded by Mason on 28 November 2012 as part of its Live Hour programme, presented by Chris Hawkins.

In October 2020, Mason performed an outdoor concert at the Martha's Vineyard Museum in Vineyard Haven.

In July 2021, he appeared with his band at Sonic Revolution at the Loft, a free concert presented by the Martha’s Vineyard Concert Series in Oak Bluffs.

In June 2022, Mason gave a free public performance at the West Tisbury Library on Martha’s Vineyard.

In January 2023, he performed a headline show at Atwood’s Tavern in Cambridge, Massachusetts.

In May 2024, Mason continued performing live, with multiple dates documented by JamBase.

In November 2025, he returned to Europe for a tour and performed at the Witloof Bar at Le Botanique in Brussels with his trio.

In September and October 2026, Mason is scheduled to appear as the special guest on The Lemonheads’ U.K. tour, which includes ten dates.

== Discography ==
=== Albums ===
- Where the Humans Eat (2004) No. 38 UK (2005 release)
- If the Ocean Gets Rough (2007) No. 33 UK, No. 60 Ireland
- Carry On (2012)
- Upstairs at United, Vol. 7 - Willy Mason & Brendan Benson (2013)
- Already Dead (2021)

=== Extended plays ===
- Untitled (G-Ma's Basement) EP (2004) (U.K. and U.S.)
- Hard Hand to Hold (Radiate) EP (2004) (U.K. only)
- Hard to Lie Down (Radiate) EP (2005) (U.K. only)
- Scraps (Radiate / Astralwerks) EP (2006) (U.S. only)
- March 28, 2006 EP (2006) (worldwide)
- It's Easy to Talk EP (2007) (worldwide)
- gmb01 Live Tour EP (2009) (U.K. only)
- So Long Baby Shoes EP (2010) (worldwide)
- Live at Grange Hall (2011) (worldwide)

=== Singles ===
- "Oxygen (Radiate)" (2005) No. 23 (U.K. only)
- "So Long (Radiate)" (2005) No. 45 (U.K. only)
- "Hard Hand to Hold " (2005)
- "Save Myself (Radiate)" (2007) No. 42 U.K.
- "We Can Be Strong" feat KT Tunstall (Radiate)(2007) No. 52 U.K.
- "Talk Me Down" (2013)
- "Youth On A Spit" (2021)

== Other contributions ==
- WFUV: City Folk Live VII (2004) – "Oxygen"
- Live at Spaceland Acoustic (2004, unreleased) – guitar
- Acoustic 07 (2007, V2 Records) – "Oxygen"
- The Saturday Sessions: The Dermot O'Leary Show (2007, EMI) – "Careless Whisper"

== Personal life ==
Mason is married to the artist Marciana Jones, who contributed an improvised poem to his 2021 album Already Dead.

== See also ==
- List of blues musicians
- List of country music performers
- List of folk musicians
- List of singer-songwriters
- List of people from Massachusetts
- List of people from New York City
- List of Virgin Records artists
