= Tour EP (Band of Horses EP) =

EP by Band of Horses
- Released: 2005
- Genre: Indie rock
- Length: 23:25
- Label: Self-released / Sub Pop
- Producer: Band of Horses

Band of Horses chronology
| Tour EP (2005) | Everything All the Time (2006) |

The Tour EP is an EP by Band of Horses, which preceded their debut album, Everything All the Time. The self-released EP was initially sold at shows and was later made available in limited quantities at Sub Pop's website. It features early versions of five tracks from Everything All the Time as well as the otherwise unavailable track "(Biding Time Is A) Boat to Row."

== Track listing ==
| No. | Title | Length |
|---|---|---|
| 1. | "Savannah (Part One)" (Demo) | 2:33 |
| 2. | "The Snow Fall" a.k.a. "The First Song" (Demo) | 4:00 |
| 3. | "For Wicked Gil" (Demo) | 2:55 |
| 4. | "The Great Salt Lake" (Live) | 4:50 |
| 5. | "Billion Day Funeral" (Live) | 5:23 |
| 6. | "(Biding Time Is A) Boat to Row" (Live) | 3:44 |
