= Everything All the Time =

Studio album by Band of Horses
- Released: March 21, 2006
- Recorded: Avast Studios
- Genre: Indie rock
- Length: 36:06
- Label: Sub Pop
- Producer: Band of Horses, Phil Ek

Band of Horses chronology
Tour EP (2005)	Everything All the Time (2006)	Cease to Begin (2007)

Singles from Everything All the Time
- 1. "The Funeral" Released: May 21, 2006; 2. "The Great Salt Lake" Released: August 2006

Everything All the Time is the debut album of indie rock band Band of Horses and was released on March 21, 2006, on Sub Pop Records. It features new versions of five of the six songs from the band's Tour EP, some with different titles.

The album is the only one to feature original band members Mat Brooke, Chris Early and Tim Meinig. Vocalist Ben Bridwell, guitarist Mat Brooke and drummer Sera Cahoone were all members of Carissa's Wierd when the band broke up in 2003.

== History ==
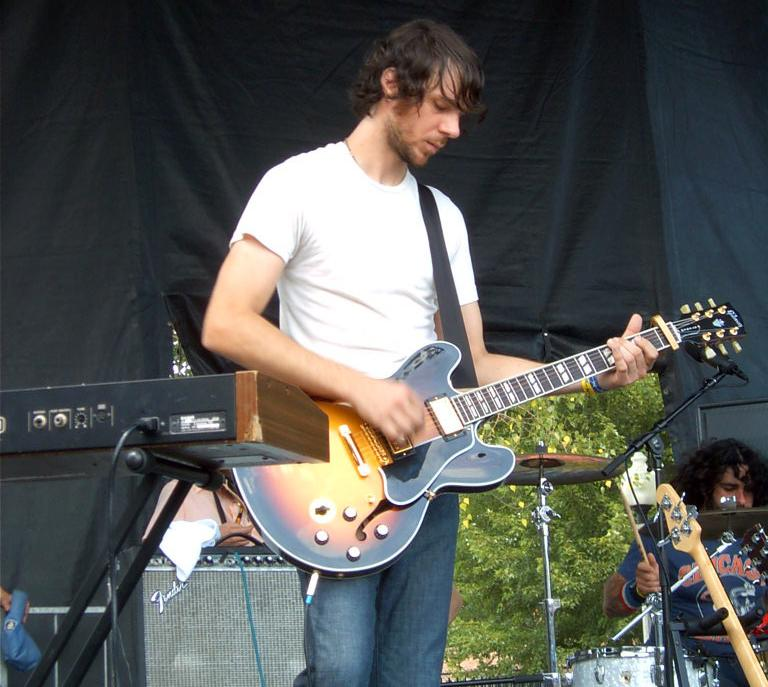
Joe Arnone (with Barrett behind)

Everything All the Time features the band's original four-piece lineup, although both Tim Meinig and Sera Cahoone receive drumming credits. The band recorded this album in the heart of Seattle for Sub Pop Records. Discussing the album's sound, band leader Ben Bridwell said, "I thought before recording that I really wanted an ELO-sounding record, with strings and keyboards and synths, but then, as we got closer to it, we wanted to take a more raw approach." Regarding its lyrics, he added, "A lot of these songs didn't really come from any lyric writing, let alone any singing ability. A lot of the ways the words are sung were meant to hide or mask what's being said. But there are definitely words. I wrote 'em down on paper and everything."

The band performed the first single from the album, "The Funeral", on the Late Show with David Letterman. By that time Brooke, Meinig and Early had all left the band and had been replaced by Joe Arnone (keyboards, guitar), Rob Hampton (guitar, bass) and Creighton Barrett (drums). "The Funeral" has been used extensively in film, TV, video games and advertisements.

The two tracks with lyrics written by Mat Brooke, "I Go to the Barn..." and "St. Augustine" feature co-lead vocals by Brooke and Bridwell although Brooke's vocals are much quieter than Bridwell's. A demo version of "I Go to the Barn..." titled "I'd Like to Think" was recorded by Brooke and Bridwell as Nov 16, a short lived project between Carissa's Wierd and Band of Horses. On the Nov 16 version, Bridwell's vocals are much quieter than Brooke's. Neither "I Go to the Barn..." nor "St. Augustine" were played live after Brooke's 2006 departure from the band until December 2012, when both songs reappeared in their live setlist.

The album was a minor hit in Scandinavia, appearing in the lower reaches of both the Swedish and Norwegian album charts.

== Reception ==
Professional ratings
Aggregate scores
Source	Rating
Metacritic	78/100
Review scores
Source	Rating
AllMusic	3.5/5 stars
Blender	4/5 stars
Drowned in Sound	8/10
Entertainment Weekly	B+
Houston Chronicle	A
NME	7/10
Pitchfork	8.8/10
PopMatters	6/10
Slant Magazine	3.5/5 stars
Uncut	4/5 stars

The album was generally well received by critics. It has a score of 78 out of 100 from 24 critics on the website Metacritic. Pitchfork placed Everything All the Time at number 109 on their list of top 200 albums of the 2000s.

== Track listing ==
No.	Title	Writer(s)	Length
1.	"The First Song"	Band of Horses	3:43
2.	"Wicked Gil"	Band of Horses	2:57
3.	"Our Swords"	Band of Horses	2:26
4.	"The Funeral"	Band of Horses	5:21
5.	"Part One"	Band of Horses	2:36
6.	"The Great Salt Lake"	Band of Horses	4:45
7.	"Weed Party"	Band of Horses	3:09
8.	"I Go to the Barn Because I Like The"	Band of Horses	3:06
9.	"Monsters"	Band of Horses	5:21
10.	"St. Augustine"	Band of Horses	2:41

All songs written by Band of Horses, lyrics by Bridwell, except 8 & 10 lyrics by Brooke.

== Personnel ==
- Ben Bridwell – vocals (all), pedal steel guitar (1, 8, 9), electric guitar (2, 4, 6, 7), piano (2), bass (3)
- Mat Brooke – electric guitar (1, 2, 4, 6, 7, 9), acoustic guitar (4–6, 8–10), e-bow (4), vocals (8, 10), banjo (9)
- Chris Early – bass guitar (1–9)
- Tim Meinig – drums (1, 4, 6–9)
- Sera Cahoone – drums (2, 3, 5)

== Chart performance ==
Chart	Peak
U.S. Billboard Heatseekers Albums	25
U.S. Billboard Independent Albums	31
UK Albums Chart	191
Norwegian Albums Chart	25
Swedish Albums Chart	58

== Certifications and sales ==
Region	Certification	Certified units/sales
Denmark (IFPI Danmark)	Gold	10,000^{‡}
Norway (IFPI Norway)	Gold	20,000^{*}
United States (RIAA)	Gold	500,000^{‡}
^{*} Sales figures based on certification alone.^{‡} Sales+streaming figures based on certification alone.
