= Sera Cahoone =

American singer-songwriter (born 1975)

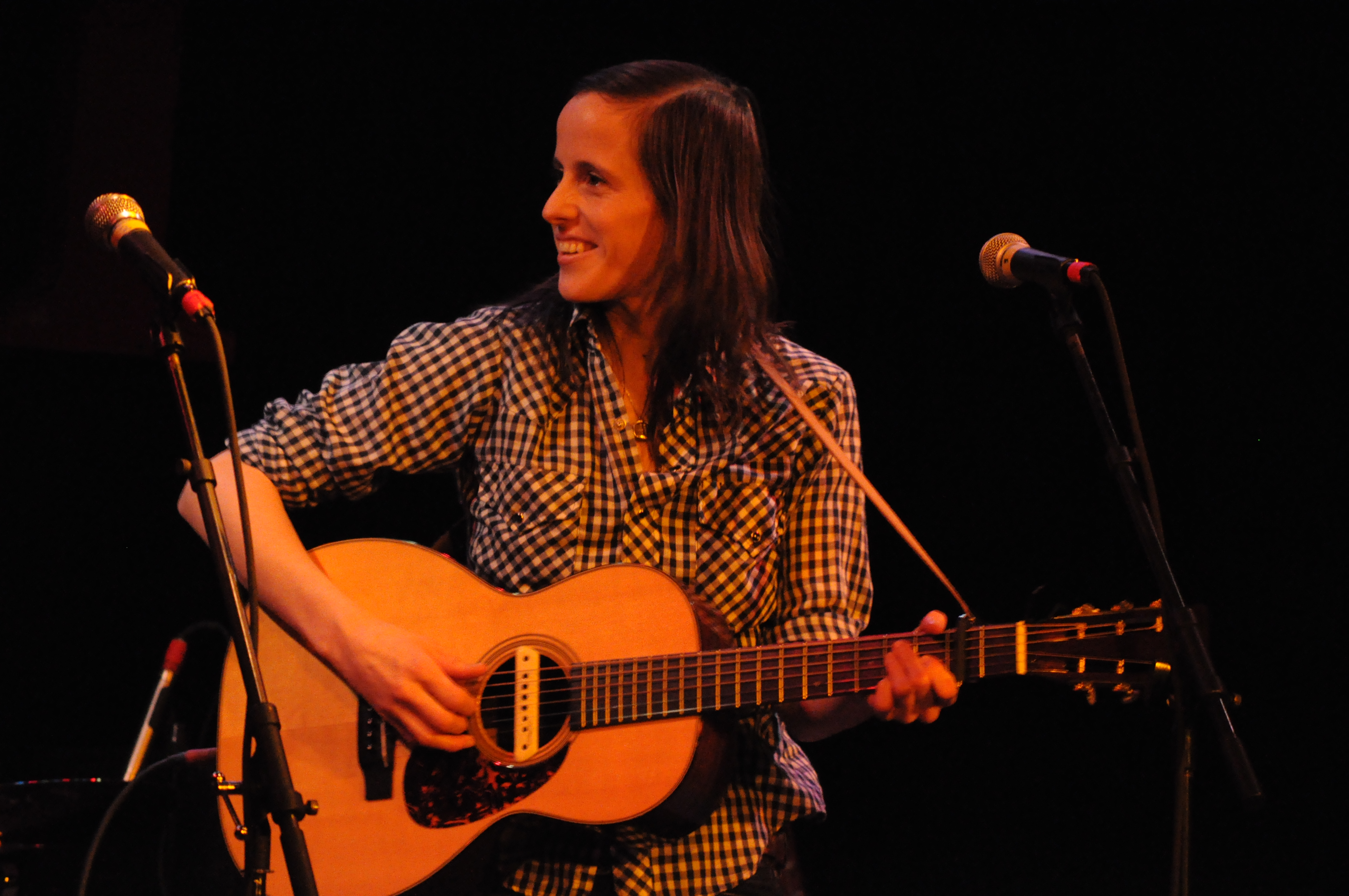
- Cahoone performing in 2011

Background information
- Born: August 4, 1975 (age 51)
- Genres: Indie rock; lo-fi; Americana; folk
- Occupation: Singer-songwriter
- Instruments: Vocals, guitar, drums
- Years active: 2006–present
- Labels: Sub Pop, Lady Muleskinner
- Formerly of: Carissa's Wierd; Band of Horses
- Website: www.seracahoone.com

Sera Cahoone (born August 4, 1975) is an American singer-songwriter from Seattle, Washington. Cahoone's music combines elements of classic country-western and modern indie rock and lo-fi music. She is also a drummer, most notably having played drums for the bands Carissa's Wierd and Band of Horses.

== Early life ==
Cahoone is the daughter of Bill Cahoone, a Rocky Mountain dynamite salesman, and Judy Cahoone (née Ahrendts), a business executive. Cahoone said that she was raised by a single mother. She has a sister named Kal Cahoone and brother named Nathan Cahoone, both of whom are also musicians.

Cahoone grew up in Littleton, Colorado. She attended and graduated from Columbine High School.

Cahoone got her musical start on the drums at twelve years old. She had taken up drumming to combat anxiety, and found she had a talent and affinity for the instrument. She also played her brother's guitar and sang, but not in public at that time. Her first stage performance came in a North Denver bar called Ziggie's Saloon (near the Oriental Theater). She played drums behind a group of bluesmen at an open mic night.

== Career ==
=== Drumming career ===
In 1998, Cahoone moved to Seattle, Washington, when the snowboarding shop where she worked in Colorado opened a retail store in Washington state. She worked there for two years before quitting. She subsequently worked in a coffee shop and focused on playing music.

Cahoone was the drummer in the band Carissa's Wierd until they broke up in 2003. After that, Cahoone played drums with various bands including Los Angeles singer-songwriter Patrick Park and most notably, Band of Horses. Cahoone has also played drums with Panda and Angel, and Betsy Olson. She recorded selected tracks of the critically acclaimed Band of Horses debut record, Everything All The Time, as a session player.

=== Solo recording career ===
==== Sera Cahoone ====
In 2006, Cahoone began to release solo work. Her first album was a self-released, self-titled record called Sera Cahoone, which was praised by indie-rock radio station KEXP along with NPR. Seattle indie newspaper The Stranger called Sera's debut "a breathtaking collection of sad and dusky songs that reveal an artist of remarkable depth as well as a truly stunning voice."

==== Only as the Day Is Long ====
In 2007, Cahoone was signed to the Seattle label Sub Pop Records which was home to former Carissa's Wierd bandmates Ben Bridwell (Band of Horses) and later Mat Brooke (Grand Archives). Cahoone's second album, Only As The Day Is Long, was released in 2008.

==== Deer Creek Canyon ====
Sera and her band recorded her second Sub Pop record, Deer Creek Canyon, in February 2012 at Bear Creek Studios in Woodinville, Washington, over a two-week period with Los Angeles producer Thom Monahan (Devendra Banhart, Vetiver). Additional vocals and tracking were done in Los Angeles over several weeks in early March. The record was released September 25, 2012.

==== From Where I Started ====
In 2017 it was announced that Sera's fourth album titled From Where I Started will be self-released on March 24, 2017. Recorded at Flora Recording and Playback in Portland Oregon, From Where I Started was co-produced by Sera Cahoone and John Morgan Askew (Neko Case, Laura Gibson, Alela Diane). Askew brought together key Portland musicians like Rob Burger (Iron and Wine, Lucinda Williams), Dave Depper (Death Cab For Cutie) and Annalisa Tornfelt (Black Prairie) with Cahoone's Seattle bandmates – Jeff Fielder (Mark Lanegan, Amy Ray) and Jason Kardong (Son Volt, Jay Farrar).

=== Touring ===
Cahoone has toured with Son Volt, Matt Costa, Band of Horses, Grand Archives, Sea Wolf, Patrick Park, Tift Merritt, Beachwood Sparks, Fruit Bats, Ben Gibbard, Jay Farrar, Gregory Alan Isakov, Blitzen Trapper, Mason Jennings, Kathleen Edwards, and Joe Pug. She has opened for Lucinda Williams, Okkervil River, Mary Gauthier, and The Indigo Girls.

Cahoone and her bandmate Jason Kardong were the first people to play music on the roof of Seattle's Space Needle as part of the Sub Pop Records Silver Jubilee Celebration on July 11, 2013. Their performance was broadcast live on radio station KEXP and streamed around the world.

== Personal life ==
In August 2015, Cahoone became engaged to Megan Rapinoe, a midfielder/winger for the United States Women's National Soccer Team and the Seattle Reign FC of the National Women's Soccer League. In January 2017, Rapinoe stated their wedding plans were on hold.

== Discography ==
- 2005: Sera Cahoone (self-released, licensed distribution via Sub Pop Records)
- 2008: Only as the Day Is Long (Sub Pop Records)
- 2012: Deer Creek Canyon (Sub Pop Records)
- 2017: From Where I Started (Lady Muleskinner Records)
- 2018: The Flora String Sessions (Lady Muleskinner Records)
- 2026: I've Missed You All These Years (Sub Pop Records)
