= Carissa's Wierd =

American indie rock band

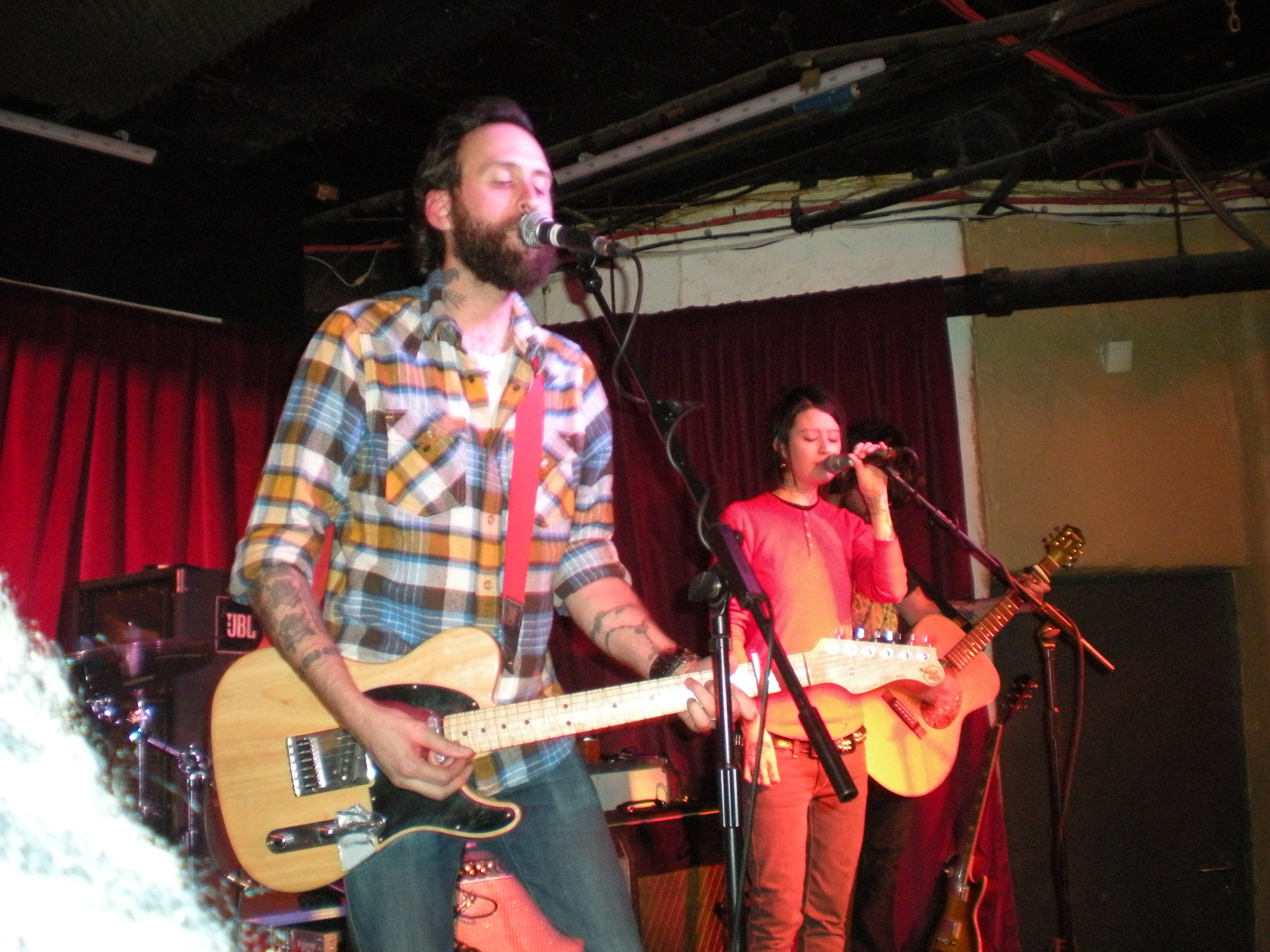
- Mat Brooke and Jenn Champion playing with Grand Archives in London on February 5, 2010.

Background information
- Origin: Tucson, Arizona, U.S. Seattle, Washington, U.S.
- Genres: Indie rock; chamber pop; slowcore; indie folk
- Years active: 1995–2003; 2010–2011; 2019; 2025–present
- Labels: Brown; Sad Robot; Hardly Art
- Spinoffs: Band of Horses; Grand Archives
- Members: Mat Brooke; Jenn Champion; Sarah Standard; Sera Cahoone
- Past members: Ben Bridwell; Jeff Hellis; Robin Peringer

Carissa's Wierd is an American indie rock band formed in Tucson, Arizona, in 1995 by Mat Brooke and Jenn Champion, later moving to Seattle, Washington.

The band later added Ben Bridwell and Sera Cahoone, releasing three albums before disbanding in 2003. The band deliberately misspelled the word "Weird" in their name, and their sound has been described as chamber rock and slowcore.

After disbanding, Brooke and Bridwell formed Band of Horses, while Champion pursued a solo career as "S". The original lineup reunited in 2011 for a few concerts, while Brooke and Champion reunited again in 2019 and 2025 to play the band's catalog.

== History ==
Carissa's Wierd was formed in Tucson, Arizona, in 1995 by Brooke and Champion when they were teenagers, practicing on rudimentary cheap guitars and amplifiers. Originally sharing bills with hardcore bands in the Tucson scene, Carissa's Wierd made a name for themselves and the pair toured behind Modest Mouse, using fake IDs to gain their way into clubs and riding in U-Hauls.

As the band grew, Brooke and Champion found themselves filling out the band with Sera Cahoone and Ben Bridwell, plus a rotating cast of other musicians. Relocating to the Pacific Northwest, the band's debut album, Ugly But Honest, was released in 1999 on Bridwell's own label, Brown Records. The band was later signed to Sad Robot Records. Some songs on the band's debut were recorded in the basement of former Tool bassist Paul D'Amour.

The band played their final shows at the Crocodile Cafe in Seattle in November 2003.

Following the band's breakup, Jenn Champion and Sera Cahoone started solo projects, Champion's under the name "S." Mat Brooke and Ben Bridwell formed Band of Horses, which Brooke later left to form the band Grand Archives.

In July 2010, Brooke revealed that he and Champion had bought back the rights to Carissa's Wierd's catalogue, which was previously owned by the now defunct label Sad Robot. They then signed to Hardly Art, through which they rereleased their catalogue and released a new "best of" compilation titled They'll Only Miss You When You Leave: Songs 1996-2003. The compilation was preceded by a one-off reunion show on July 9, 2010, at Seattle's Showbox at the Market, which featured all bandmates aside from Bridwell.

In July 2011, Mat Brooke told The Air-Raid Podcast, in an episode entitled "History Repeats Itself With Grand Archives," that another reunion show was scheduled at Neumos in Seattle on September 24. Brooke said that the band may play the Ugly But Honest album in its entirety, with the original band line-up. In August 2011, a new single, "Tucson" was released and that was followed, on October 10, by another concert at New York University.

In July 2019, Brooke and Champion announced a string of Ugly But Honest 20th anniversary shows billed under "Mat Brooke and Jenn Champion of Carissa's Wierd." The shows occurred that November, in Los Angeles, San Francisco, and Seattle. A fourth show, scheduled for New York, was later announced for March 2020. It was subsequently cancelled due to the COVID-19 pandemic before ultimately taking place five years later, on November 16, 2025., during which they played some new music.

In September 2026, Carissa’s Wierd announced that a new album, Somewhere Further Than Far Away, would be released in January 2027, with former members Sarah Standard and Sera Cahoone returning on violin and drums, respectively.

== Band members ==
=== Current members ===
- Mat Brooke – vocals, guitar (1995–2003, 2010, 2019, 2025–present)
- Jenn Champion – vocals, guitar (1995–2003, 2010, 2019, 2025–present)
- Sarah Standard – violin (2001–2003, 2026–present)
- Sera Cahoone – drums (2003, 2026–present)

=== Former members ===
- Ben Bridwell – drums (2000–2003), bass (2003)
- Robin Perringer – drums (1998–2000)
- Jeff Hellis – keyboards, accordion (2001–2003)

== Discography ==
=== Albums ===
- Ugly But Honest: 1996-1999 (2000)
- You Should Be at Home Here (2001)
- Songs About Leaving (2002)
- Somewhere Further Than Far Away (2027)

=== Live albums ===
- I Before E (2004)

=== Compilations ===
- Scrap Book (2003; reissue on Hardly Art, 2010)
- They'll Only Miss You When You Leave: Songs 1996-2003 - Hardly Art (2010)

=== Singles ===
- "You Should Be Hated Here" 7" - Sub Pop Records (2001)
- "Tucson" b/w "Meredith & Iris" 7" - Hardly Art (2011)
- "No One Lives Here Anymore" (2026)
- "I Don't Feel Like I Feel Right" (2026)
- "Exploding Necklaces" (2026)

=== Appearances on compilation albums ===
- Home Alive Compilation, Volume 2: Flying Side Kick - Broken Rekids (2001)
- Keepsake, Volume 1 - Keep Recordings (2004)
