= Mat Brooke =

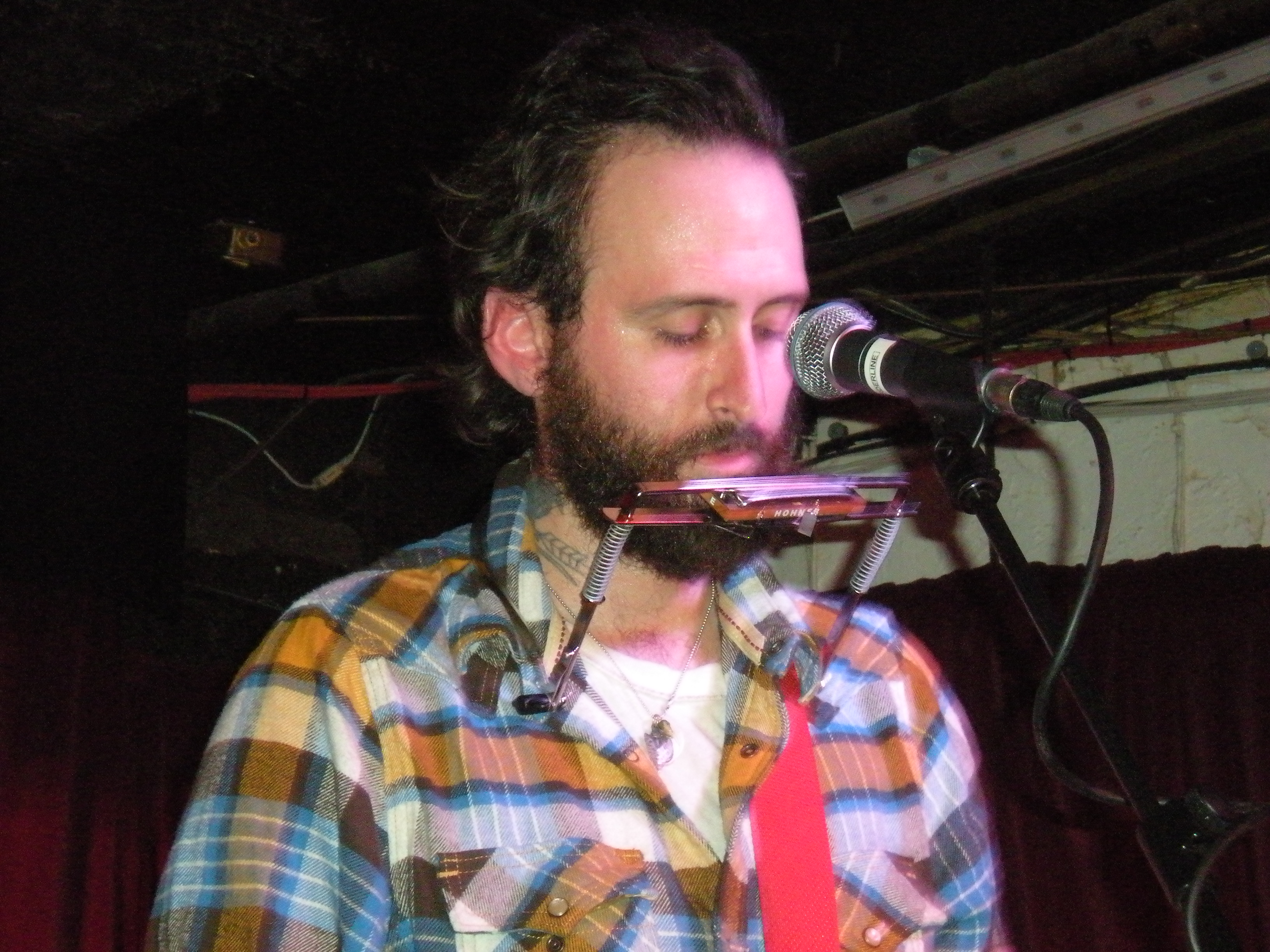
- Mat with Grand Archives in London, February 5, 2010

Background information
- Born: Mathew Etter Brooke
- Genre: Indie rock
- Occupations: Singer, songwriter, guitarist
- Instruments: Vocals, guitar
- Years active: 1999–present
- Label: Sub Pop
- Website: Grand Archives Facebook

Mathew Etter Brooke is an American musician, best known as the lead singer of American rock band Grand Archives and a former member of the bands Band of Horses and Carissa's Wierd.

== Early life ==
In the mid 1990s, Brooke worked selling pizza in Tucson, Arizona with future bandmates Ben Bridwell and Jenn Champion. In 1997 the trio moved to Olympia, Washington for a year before becoming bored with that city and moving to Seattle. Brooke and Champion had met in Tucson aged fifteen and had briefly both lived in Michigan.

== Carissa's Wierd ==
In Seattle, Brooke and Champion formed Carissa's Wierd, who released three studio albums, the first two on Bridwell's Brown Records label. The band broke up in 2003, since then three compilation albums have been released. Carissa's Wierd reformed for a one-off show in Seattle on July 9, 2010.

In July 2010, Brooke announced that he and Jenn Champion had bought the rights to Carissa's Wierd's back catalogue from Sad Robot Records. He said, "Me and Jenn have been working for a while to buy back the rights to all of our records and we finally were able to get them all back." This should allow all of Carissa's Wierd's albums to be re-released soon.

== Band of Horses ==
Following the breakup of Carissa's Wierd, Ben Bridwell formed the group Band of Horses, which he invited Brooke to join. Brooke explained what happened, "So they ended up getting a show opening up for Iron and Wine in Seattle and Ben asked if I would just come up and do a couple songs, just 'cause we're friends. So...I did that. It was fun and then a couple of Iron and Wine tours came up...and then next thing I knew, we were in the studio making a record for Sub Pop."

Brooke played guitar on Band of Horses first album, Everything All the Time, and wrote two of the tracks, "I Go to the Barn Because I Like the" and "St. Augustine." He left the band soon after the release of the album, "I'd never really given the commitment to be a formal member. It was just a spur of the moment...and Everything All the Time took off really fast...I still didn't feel quite committed. It was still 100 percent Ben's project and I kinda wanted to see what else I could do."

== Grand Archives ==
After taking some time off to open a bar in Seattle, Brooke formed the band Grand Archives with fellow Seattle musicians Ron Lewis, Thomas Wright, Curtis Hall and Jeff Montano. They played as support band for notable acts such as Sera Cahoone and Modest Mouse and were featured by the influential music website Pitchfork Media.

Grand Archives released their debut album, The Grand Archives on Sub Pop Records in February 2008. They toured the U.S. and Europe to promote the album. They became a four-piece in November 2008 when multi-instrumentalist Ron Lewis left the band.

The band's second album, Keep in Mind Frankenstein, was released in September 2009. The band again toured North America and Europe to promote the album. On the tour, Brooke's former Carissa's Wierd bandmate Robin Peringer played guitar and keyboards. The band played a short tour of Europe and the west coast of the US in July and August 2010, during which Brooke announced that they hoped to record their third album shortly. A demo of four songs from the album, titled Villains, was released as a free download on October 7, 2010. Three more free demos were made available in June 2011.

== Personal life ==
Brooke was the co-owner of the Redwood Bar in the Capitol Hill area of Seattle. He married his partner Lisa Jack, who was also a co-owner of the Redwood, in Hawaii in December 2009. In 2012, Mat and Lisa launched another business venture in Seattle, a restaurant and bar called The Oak.

The Redwood closed in November 2017 and the couple sold their stake in The Oak.

The following spring, Brooke and Jack announced they were opening a new restaurant venture in their newly adopted hometown of Port Angeles, Washington. The Spruce, as it will be called, will focus on foods and beer sourced from the Pacific Northwest. The restaurant is slated to open in summer 2018.
