= Ben Bridwell =

American musician

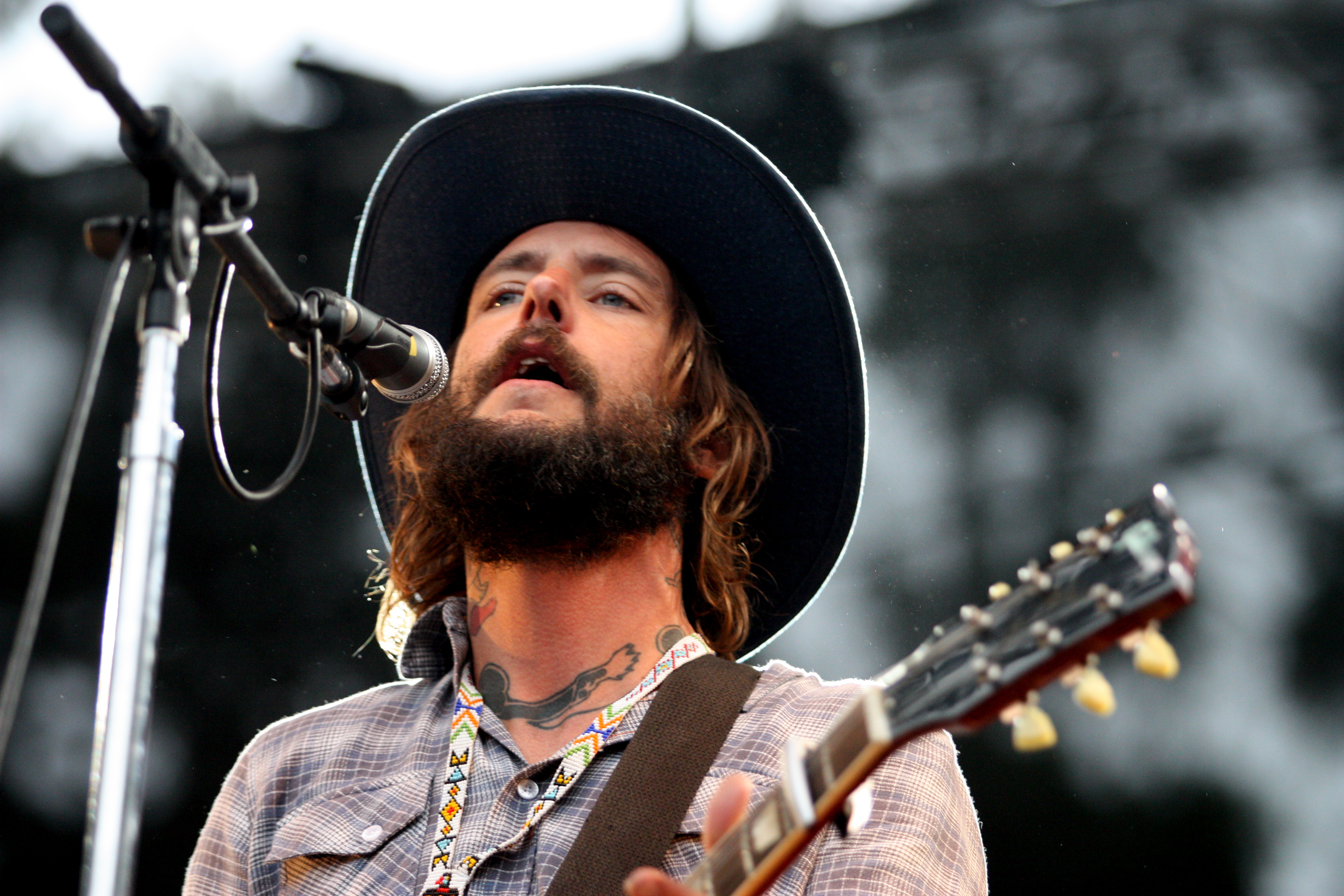
- Bridwell playing with Band of Horses in August, 2009

Background information
- Born: Benjamin Bridwell; April 25, 1978 (age 48)
- Origin: Irmo, South Carolina
- Genres: Indie rock, alternative country, Southern rock
- Occupations: Singer, songwriter, musician
- Instruments: Vocals; guitar; bass; pedal steel; drums; percussion; keyboards
- Years active: 2001–present
- Labels: Brown Records; Fat Possum; Columbia
- Website: www.bandofhorses.com

Benjamin Bridwell (born April 25, 1978) is an American singer, songwriter, record producer and musician. He is best known as the lead singer and only continuous member of the American rock band Band of Horses, as well as a former member of the band Carissa's Wierd.

== Early life ==
Bridwell was born on April 25, 1978 and grew up in Irmo, South Carolina. He left home at age 16 and moved to Tucson, Arizona to live with his mother.

== Carissa's Wierd ==
While living in Tucson, Bridwell worked with Mat Brooke and Jenn Champion, selling pizza. In 1997 the three moved to Olympia, Washington, but soon relocated to Seattle, where all three worked in a bar. Bridwell founded a record label, Brown Records, while Brooke and Champion formed the band Carissa's Wierd. Bridwell later received some basic drumming tuition from Brooke and subsequently replaced Carissa's Wierd drummer Robin Peringer, who left to play guitar on tour with Modest Mouse. Bridwell later moved on to bass guitar.

Brown Records released the first two Carissa's Wierd albums, but Bridwell eventually gave up running the label and Carissa's Wierd released their third album on Sad Robot records, before splitting up in 2003. The band reformed for a few shows in 2010 and 2011, but Bridwell took no part in that reunion.

== Band of Horses ==
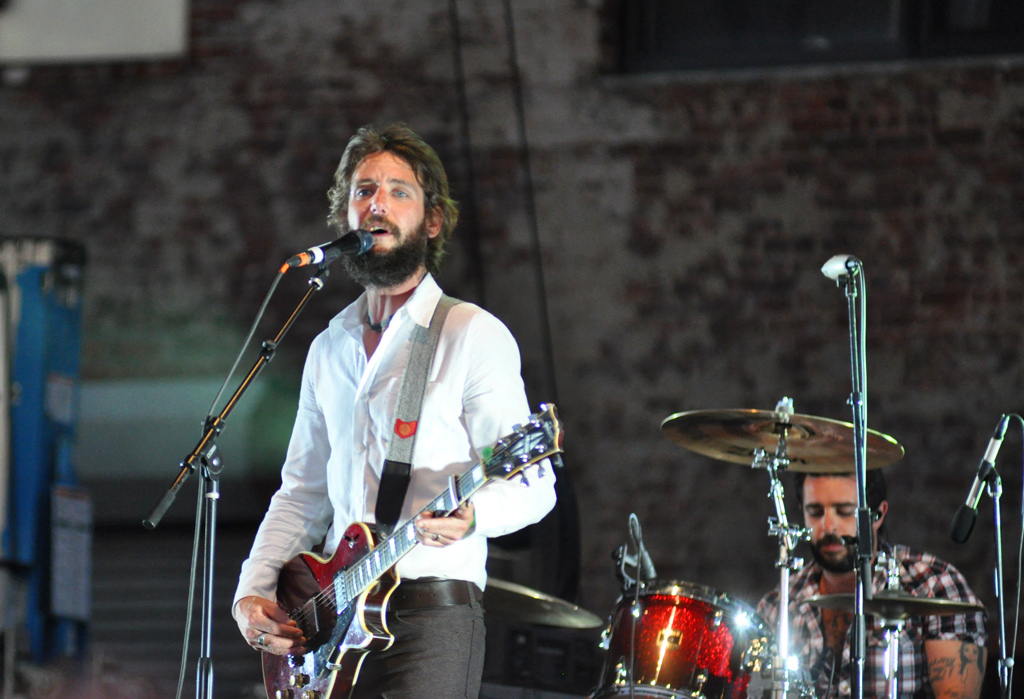
Ben playing in Brooklyn on June 20, 2010 with drummer Creighton Barrett

Following the split of Carissa's Wierd, Brooke helped Bridwell learn to play guitar and he also began writing songs. He formed the band 'Horses' which soon had to change its name to Band of Horses, following the discovery that a long defunct band called Horses (featuring actor Don Johnson) were issuing re-releases. Band of Horses were briefly a trio featuring Bridwell (vocals and guitar), Tim Meinig (drums) and Chris Early (bass), but former Carissa's Wierd leader Mat Brooke (guitar and vocals) was added to the line up and the quartet released their debut album Everything All the Time in March 2006. In response to Bridwell's success, Brooke said, " I kind of feel bad, maybe Carissa's Wierd was holding him back, all this time...(I am) extremely proud. He took the ball and ran with it. At a time when we were all down he picked himself up, higher than anyone thought he could. It's kind of like seeing your kid brother blossom."

Brooke, Early and Meinig quit soon after Everything All the Time was released, but Bridwell recruited new musicians and the band's popularity continued to grow. Their second album, Cease to Begin was released in October 2007. It was recorded by the core trio of Bridwell, Creighton Barrett (drums) and Rob Hampton (guitar and bass), with keyboards by Ryan Monroe.

Band of Horses third album, Infinite Arms was released on May 18, 2010, and was nominated for a Grammy Award in the Best Alternative Album category. For Infinite Arms the band became a five-piece featuring Bridwell, Barrett, Monroe, Tyler Ramsey (guitar) and Bill Reynolds (bass). That line up has also recorded the band's 4th album, Mirage Rock, which was released on September 18, 2012.

== Other projects ==
Bridwell contributed the track "Your Love Is Forever" a George Harrison cover, to the album Sweetheart a compilation album released by Starbucks Entertainment on January 30, 2010. He duetted with Courtney Jaye on a cover version of The Jesus and Mary Chain track "Sometimes Always" on her 2010 album, The Exotic Sounds of Courtney Jaye. Bridwell also appears on "Starting Over", a track on the Macklemore & Ryan Lewis' album The Heist and on the tracks "Opposite" and "Accident Without Emergency" on the Biffy Clyro album Opposites. He also collaborated with Iron & Wine on a cover album called Sing into My Mouth, which was released on July 17, 2015. In 2017 Bridwell contributed two tracks ("Unlikely Force" and "Tara") to the super-group project BNQT's first album, Volume 1 released April 28.

== Brown Records ==
Band of Horses third album, Infinite Arms, was released on Bridwell's previously defunct Brown Records label (along with Columbia and Fat Possum). Bridwell explained his original intentions for his label, "I really started it with the idea of it being a stepping stone. I would press a thousand CDs, we'd get 'em in stores...get in a local independent radio station and the band would have something to sell at shows and then hopefully a real label would pick it up. It got a lot busier than I ever imagined...in the end it just went out of control...I never expected it to be a real label. I'm re-pressing thousands and... 'Shit, I'm...gonna have to do this correctly, people's livelihoods (are) resting in my hands.'...I ended up cracking under the pressure, especially just getting those bands on a real label...That's always been my calling, spreading the bands I liked that people hadn't heard." With reference to the label's relaunch he added, "Now I've just heard that call again...a lot of artists are unheard that I think I can try to help with."

== Personal life ==
Bridwell married Elizabeth Rae McCann on April 4, 2009. They have four daughters, Annabelle, who was born in 2008, Ivy, who was born in November 2010, Birdie, who was born in September 2014, and Georgia, who was born in 2015.
