= Grandaddy discography =

- Studio albums: 8
- Extended plays: 5
- Live albums: 2
- Compilation albums: 3
- Singles: 16
- Other albums: 1

The discography of American indie rock band Grandaddy includes seven studio albums, two live albums, three compilation albums, five extended plays, and sixteen singles.

== Albums ==
=== Studio albums ===
Title	Album details	Peak chart positions										Certifications
Title	Album details	US	BEL (Fl)	BEL (Wa)	FRA	IRL	NLD	SCO	SWE	SWI	UK	Certifications
Complex Party Come Along Theories	Released: 1994; Self-released	—	—	—	—	—	—	—	—	—	—	
Under the Western Freeway	Released: October 21, 1997; Label: Will	—	—	—	—	—	—	—	—	—	131	
The Sophtware Slump	Released: May 29, 2000; Label: V2	—	—	—	—	64	—	39	—	—	36	BPI: Silver
Sumday	Released: May 13, 2003; Label: V2	84	13	30	44	30	— (Note: Sumday did not enter the Dutch Album Top 100, but peaked at number one on the Dutch Alternative Top 30.)	19	51	—	22	
Just Like the Fambly Cat	Released: May 9, 2006; Label: V2	171	39	82	58	82	— (Note: Just Like the Fambly Cat did not enter the Dutch Album Top 100, but peaked at number 11 on the Dutch Alternative Top 30.)	41	—	—	50	
Last Place	Released: March 3, 2017; Label: 30th Century	150	12	43	78	31	82	10	—	51	18	
Sophtware Slump ..... On a Wooden Piano	Released: November 20, 2020; Label: Dangerbird	—	182	—	—	—	—	15	—	—	— (Note: Sophtware Slump ..... On a Wooden Piano did not enter the UK Albums Chart, but peaked at number 19 on the UK Album Sales Chart.)	
Blu Wav	Released: February 16, 2024; Label: Dangerbird	— (Note: Blu Wav did not enter the US Billboard 200, but peaked at number 40 on the US Top Current Albums Chart.)	8	—	—	—	—	11	—	73	93	
"—" denotes a recording that did not chart or was not released in that territory.

=== Live albums ===
Title	Album details
Recorded Live Amongst Friends and Fidget	Released: 1994; Self-released
Live at the Art Factory	Released: 1997; Self-released

=== Compilation albums ===
Title	Album details	Peak chart positions	
Title	Album details	SCO	UK Indie
The Broken Down Comforter Collection	Released: 1999; Label: Big Cat	91	28
The Windfall Varietal	Released: 2000; Self-released	—	—
Concrete Dunes	Released: 2002; Label: Lakeshore	—	—
Sumday: Excess Baggage	Released: August 25, 2023; Label: Dangerbird	—	—
"—" denotes a recording that did not chart or was not released in that territory.

=== Other albums ===
Title	Album details
The Ham and Its Lily (credited to Arm of Roger)	Released: December 20, 2002; Label: Sweat of the Alps

== Extended plays ==
Title	EP details	Peak chart positions	
Title	EP details	UK	UK Indie
Prepare to Bawl	Released: 1992; Self-released	—	—
A Pretty Mess by This One Band	Released: 1996; Label: Will	—	—
Signal to Snow Ratio	Released: 1999; Label: V2	—	—
Through a Frosty Plate Glass E.P.	Released: 2001; Label: V2	—	—
Excerpts from the Diary of Todd Zilla	Released: 2005; Label: V2	157	18
"—" denotes a recording that did not chart or was not released in that territory.

== Singles ==
Title	Year	Peak chart positions					Album
Title	Year	US AAA	MEX	SCO	UK	UK Indie	Album
"Could This Be Love"	1994	—	—	—	—	—	Non-album singles
"Taster"	1995	—	—	—	—	—	Non-album singles
"Everything Beautiful Is Far Away"	1998	—	—	—	162	28	Under the Western Freeway
"Laughing Stock"	1998	—	—	—	124	20	Under the Western Freeway
"Summer Here Kids"	1998	—	—	—	83	19	Under the Western Freeway
"A.M. 180"	1998	—	—	91	88	19	Under the Western Freeway
"The Crystal Lake"	2000	—	—	40	38	6	The Sophtware Slump
"Hewlett's Daughter"	2000	—	—	81	71	10	The Sophtware Slump
"He's Simple, He's Dumb, He's the Pilot."	2000	—	—	—	82	20	The Sophtware Slump
"Now It's On"	2003	19	—	27	23	4	Sumday
"El Caminos in the West"	2003	—	—	41	48	10	Sumday
"I'm on Standby"	2004	—	—	—	89	20	Sumday
"Nature Anthem"	2004	—	—	—	115	39	Below the Radio
"Elevate Myself"	2006	—	—	—	155	12	Just Like the Fambly Cat
"Way We Won't"	2016	—	40	—	—	—	Last Place
"RIP Coyote Condo #5"	2019	—	—	—	—	—	Non-album single
"—" denotes a recording that did not chart or was not released in that territory.

== Promotional releases ==
A-side/Title	Release date	Label	Formats & B-side(s)	Notes
"Our Dying Brains"	2000	V2	CD: "Wives Of Farmers", "Moe Bandy Mountaineers"	
The Sophtware Slump Radio Sampler	2000	V2	CD: "The Crystal Lake", "Hewlett's Daughter", "Miner At The Dial-A-View", "Broken Household Appliance National Forest"	
"Alan Parsons in a Winter Wonderland"	2000	V2		1-track CD; appears on It's a Cool Cool Christmas
Sumday – The Videos	2003	V2	DVD: "El Caminos in the West", "Now It's On"	DVD video single
Tour Sampler 2003	2003	V2	CD: "Now It's On", "Stray Dog and the Chocolate Shake", "The Crystal Lake"	Given away at live shows
Sampler	2003	V2	CD: "Yeah Is What We Had", "Miner at the Dial-a-View", "Summer Here Kids", "Levitz (Birdless)"	
Sampler	2003	V2	CD: "El Caminos In The West", "Now It's On", "I'm On Standy", "Stray Dog And The Chocolate Shake"	
"Pull the Curtains" (radio edit)	2005	V2		Radio CD-R
"Elevate Myself (Diskotik Mix)"	2006	V2		CD, credited to 'Scrum Down Rookies vs. Grandaddy'
"Just Like the Fambly Cat"	2006		CD	

== Split releases ==
Grandaddy tracks	Release date	Label	Format(s)	Split with	Notes
"I'm in Love with No-One"	1998	Devil in the Woods	7"	Morella's Forest/Dart/Shove	EP titled Alone in a Room 2 Included free with issue #17 of Devil in the Woods magazine
"Too Many Nights in a Road House"	1999	Devil in the Woods/Horse Brand Industry	Double 7"		EP titled Noise Pop 99
"MGM Grand"	2000	62TV/Ines Boukov	7"	John Wayne Shot Me	
"Fishing Boat Song"	2000	Devil in the Woods	7"	Persil/Beachwood Sparks	Available with Devil in the Woods magazine
"Aisle Seat 37-D"	June 2003	Devil in the Woods	7"	Verbena	Available with Devil in the Woods magazine
"The Rugged and Splintered Entertainment Center"	December 2003	Birdman/Good Records	7"	The Polyphonic Spree	

== Contributions ==
Album title	Release date	Label	Grandaddy tracks	Notes
Zum Audio Vol. 2	1998	Zum	"Ghost of 1672"	
Dream with the Fishes soundtrack	1997	Will	"Why Would I Want To Die"	
Unscrubbed: Live from the Laundromat III	October 1999	Toy Gun Murder	"Why Took Your Advice" (live)	
We Are Now Flying @ 20,000 Feet	2000	Cavalier / Sensory Products	"Wonder Why in LA" (live)	Free with Sadness in the Sky magazine
We Are Now Flying @ 33,000 Feet	2000	Cavalier / Sensory Products	"Collective Dreamwish of Upperclass Elegance" (live)	Free with Sadness in the Sky magazine
Little Echoes Presents Sleeping Off Stolen Dreams	2000	Little Echoes	"Rode My Bike to My Stepsister's Wedding"	Longer version than released elsewhere
It's a Cool Cool Christmas	2000	Jeepster	"Alan Parsons in a Winter Wonderland"	
Trigger Happy TV Soundtrack to Series 2	2001	Channel 4 Music	"He's Simple, He's Dumb, He's the Pilot"	
Loose – New Sounds Of The Old West – volume 3	November 2001	Loose	"Best of All Possible Worlds"	Cover of the Kris Kristofferson song
Almost Famous: Undiscovered Modern Rock Hits	January 2002	Lakeshore	"Laughing Stock"	Previously-unreleased version from Don't Sock the Tryer
I Am Sam soundtrack	2002	V2	"Revolution"	
28 Days Later: The Soundtrack Album	2002	XL	"A.M. 180"	
Nothing Left to Lose: A Tribute to Kris Kristofferson	October 2002	Incidental Music	"Best of All Possible Worlds"	Cover of the Kris Kristofferson song
Wrong Turn (soundtrack)	July 1, 2003	Lakeshore	"Why Would I Want to Die"	
X-Ray CD#07	August 2003	X-Ray	"Now It's On" (XFM Session version)	Free with X-Ray magazine
Below the Radio	2004	Ultra	"Nature Anthem"	Compiled by Jason Lytle
Live At The World Cafe Volume 18: I'll Take You There	September 2004	WXPN	"Now It's On" (live at the World Cafe)	
Alive and Rare: KCRW	May 22, 2006	V2	"The Go in the Go for It" (Live on KCRW)	
Acoustic 07	2007	V2	"Rear View Mirror"	
Kats Karavan – The History of John Peel on the Radio	October 26, 2009	Universal	"Hawaiian Island Wranglers"	From a session for John Peel's BBC Radio 1 show recorded 17/05/1998
