= The Ham and Its Lily =

Studio album by Arm of Roger
- Released: December 20, 2002
- Recorded: 1993–1999
- Genre: Indie rock; Comedy rock; Lo-fi
- Length: 51:55
- Label: Sweat of the Alps; PIAPTK/Soiled Gold
- Producer: Jason Lytle

The Ham and Its Lily is the debut (and to date, only) album by Arm of Roger, an indie rock/comedy alias for the group Grandaddy.

The Ham and Its Lily has been described by Grandaddy as intentionally "horrible, a complete joke." It was originally submitted as a "fake version of The Sophtware Slump" to their record label in 1999. Grandaddy later created an elaborate backstory for fictional group Arm of Roger, and released the recording through their label Sweat of the Alps on December 20, 2002. The Ham and Its Lily was reissued in 2015 by PIAPTK/Soiled Gold Records, who described the album as "Grandaddy's 'lost' practical joke record."

== Recording ==
In a recollection posted on the Soiled Gold Records website, Grandaddy guitarist Jim Fairchild noted that the songs that wound up comprising The Ham and Its Lily were recorded at various points between 1993 and 1999. Fairchild noted that the Arm of Roger album was "more or less done before we began work on the Signal to Snow Ratio EP in 1999" and the band "sat on it for months." He also recalled that the band's attitude while recording The Ham and Its Lily was: "This makes no sense, but fuck it, let's do it."

=== Submission to V2 Records ===
Following the release of 1997's Under the Western Freeway, Grandaddy moved from independent label Will Records to V2, a subsidiary of Virgin Records. Frontman Jason Lytle bristled at the new pressure that V2 was beginning to place on the band, later recalling: “A lot of people were putting money on the table and getting really serious about it. 'You know, the last album was cute and everything, but we really need to knock this one over the fence.'"

As a prank, Jason Lytle decided to submit The Ham and Its Lily to V2 as if it were Grandaddy's completed second album. According to guitarist Jim Fairchild, "There was all this pressure from V2 during the touring of Under the Western Freeway. We thought, 'It'd be really fucking funny to give you guys this completely terrible fucking record, and just let you guys sit with it for a little bit.'" He also reflect that the band created The Ham and Its Lily "for the specific purpose to confuse [V2] and just have a little bit of fun. It was like, 'Don't tell us how to do stuff, because if you do this is going to be the result.'"

Fairchild recalled that "...in November, 1999, [Jason] made cassettes of the fake album... [for] around 7 of the key people at V2 worldwide. We FedExed them so that they’d all arrive on a Thursday to offices in England, Benelux, France, US, and maybe Australia." After not hearing from anyone at the label for several days, the band's A&R representative at V2 called Fairchild the following Tuesday and told him: "I got the album…now will you send me the real one you fucking asshole?!" He later remembered that “Most people [at V2] were really cool about it. But some people were like, 'Now you guys are in the big leagues, you can't be doing that shit anymore. You can't be pranksters.'”

According to SF Weekly, "The move caused a minor uproar in V2's U.S. headquarters in New York City; [A&R representative] Kate Hyman broke in on a meeting label president Richard Sanders had called to discuss the matter to tell him it was a prank." The band eventually sent V2 the real version of The Sophtware Slump, which would be released in May 2000 to critical acclaim.

== Release ==
Several years after submitting the album to V2, Grandaddy decided to release The Ham and Its Lily as if it had been created by another band. Speaking to The Modesto Bee in June 2002, Jim Fairchild told the paper that they were planning "to issue a previously unreleased record by defunct band Arm of Roger, which was led by Timmy Branca of Tracy." In June 2002, CMJ New Music Monthly also reported that "Arm of Roger was an obscure California-based band that broke up soon after the completion of its album," which had been recorded in 1998. The Los Angeles Times also carried a story regarding Arm of Roger's fabricated history. By October 2002, Grandaddy had launched ArmOfRoger.com, which included the fabricated narrative regarding the band's history, a photo gallery depicting supposed band members, and a store.

The Ham and Its Lily was the first release on Grandaddy's Sweat of the Alps record label on December 20, 2002. The pressing was exclusively on compact disc, and was sold at the band's merch table during the Sumday tour of 2002-2003. Fairchild noted that, "We pressed up probably 3 or 4,000 of the CDs and sold them on tour and through our website during the time we supported Sumday, neither confirming or denying whether this was in fact the semi-legendary fake album. We spent so much time of the website, the artwork, the concept."

In 2015, The Ham and Its Lily was re-released by Soiled Gold Records, a subdivision of (PIAPTK Records). The release included two different color vinyl pressings (in a run of 200 copies), as well as a cassette version (in a run of 100 copies).

== Reception and legacy ==
The album was only reviewed by a handful of publications. In a brief review for Tape Op, producer Larry Crane wrote that The Ham and Its Lily was "Grandaddy making the dumbest music of their career in order to baffle the folks at V2 after the label dumped G-Daddy's pals Giant Sand on the eve of releasing a record. Or maybe it really is just some weird band from Tracy, CA, that has ridiculous lyrics about pussy and lo-fi robots. A party favorite around here." The Boston Globe wrote that The Ham and Its Lily provided "Evidence of [Grandaddy]'s humor." In a 2004 article, London's The Guardian called the album "hilarious" and "ribald."

Grandaddy were billed as "Arm of Roger" (as a means of avoiding publicity) at their August 7, 2012 reunion concert at the Partisan Bar in Merced, California. However, the band only performed Grandaddy songs and no Arm of Roger material.

Reflecting on The Ham and Its Lily in 2021, Fairchild noted that, "When I listen to it, sometimes I do cringe a little bit, but it's really funny more than anything."

== Track listing ==
1. Robot Escort
2. Down with the Animals
3. I Like Lo-Fi Recordings
4. One Time They Called and Asked for Freddy
5. Counting to Zero
6. Seven Days of the Week
7. Band Synergy (A Peek Inside the Magic)
8. You Know You're Fucked Up
9. Down with the Animals (radio remix)
10. The Pussy Song

== Personnel ==
(Via credits listed in the 2002 Sweat of the Alps CD release)

- Timmy Branca
- Panda Nelson
- Britney Fet
- Zeke Doloric
- Whitey Fong
- Richard Kreyebich ("Special Help from")
- Kevin Garcia ("Guest Starring")
