= The Arm of Roger =

The Arm of Roger is a fake band created by Jason Lytle and other members of American Rock band Grandaddy. The group released one album, 2002's The Ham and Its Lily on Grandaddy's Sweat of the Alps record label.

== History ==
Between 1993 and 1999, Grandaddy recorded a number of joke songs that they never intended to release to the public. As a prank, Lytle submitted the songs that would eventually comprise The Ham and Its Lily label V2 as if it were their completed second album. According to Grandaddy guitarist Jim Fairchild, "...in November, 1999, [Jason] made cassettes of the fake album... [for] around 7 of the key people at V2 worldwide. We FedExed them so that they’d all arrive on a Thursday to offices in England, Benelux, France, US, and maybe Australia."

After not hearing from anyone at the label for several days, the band's A&R representative at V2 called Fairchild the following Tuesday and told him: "I got the album…now will you send me the real one you fucking asshole?!" They then sent over The Sophtware Slump, the real album.

== Album release ==
Three years later, while creating Sumday, the band decided to make a "little label called Sweat of the Alps." One of the first releases on this label was The Ham and it's Lily, a fake band and backstory was created to suit the album and it was sold at stalls during Sumday tours.

The fake reality was that The Arm of Roger was an indie band from the 90's who had an album in plan to "change the world" called The Velvet Insides. In the story, a rival band called A Fight with Sticks burned down the composers home, taking the tapes with it. All but one of the tracks were destroyed, "Robot Escort" (The first track of the album). It was then said that the album was recorded in 1998 and released in 2002, including The Velvet Inside's version of "Robot Escort."

== Shows ==
The Arm of Roger only ever played two shows, one in 2003 with Elliott Smith, Built Like Alaska, Earlimart and Pine Marten at the Derby in Los Feliz and two more in 2012 along with Granddaddy's reunion.
