= Concrete Dunes =

Compilation album by Grandaddy
- Released: October 2002
- Genre: Indie rock
- Length: 61:27
- Label: Lakeshore

Grandaddy chronology
| Through a Frosty Plate Glass (2001) | Concrete Dunes (2002) | Sumday (2003) |

Concrete Dunes is a compilation album by American indie rock band Grandaddy, released in October 2002 by record label Lakeshore. This album has created some controversy among fans of the band, as this was not released with the band's permission. It contains all 12 tracks from The Broken Down Comforter Collection, which collected tracks from the band's early releases, plus three additional tracks (Why Would I Want to Die, My Small Love, 12-Pak-599).

== Reception ==
Professional ratings
Review scores
| Source | Rating |
|---|---|
| AllMusic | 3/5 stars |
| Stylus | B− |

Heather Phares of AllMusic described it as "a pretty good overview of Grandaddy's evolution from shambling, fuzzed-out indie rock to the more ambitious, spacy sound of their later work."

== Track listing ==
All tracks written by Jason Lytle.

1. "Why Would I Want to Die" – 4:23
2. "My Small Love" – 1:22
3. "12-Pak-599" – 3:58
4. "Wretched Songs" – 5:46
5. "Levitz" – 4:25
6. "For the Dishwasher" – 3:57
7. "Sikh in a Baja VW Bug" – 2:06
8. "Lava Kiss" – 3:06
9. "Fentry" – 4:26
10. "Gentle Spike Resort" – 3:10
11. "Away Birdies with Special Sounds" – 2:01
12. "Kim You Bore Me to Death" – 4:39
13. "Pre Merced" – 3:01
14. "Taster" – 4:09
15. "Egg Hit and Jack Too" – 10:58
