= Jed the Humanoid =

2000 song by Grandaddy

Song by Grandaddy

from the album The Sophtware Slump
- Released: May 29, 2000
- Recorded: 1999–2000
- Studio: Little Portugal, Modesto, California
- Genre: Indie rock
- Length: 4:18
- Label: V2
- Songwriter: Jason Lytle
- Producer: Jason Lytle

"Jed the Humanoid" is a song on the 2000 album The Sophtware Slump released by the Modesto, California indie-rock band Grandaddy. The song is a eulogy for Jeddy 3, an android who drinks himself to death after his creators neglect him, and is taken to be central to the nature versus technology parable of the band's second album. A music reviewer for The Guardian, Dorian Lynskey, called it "the saddest robot song ever written."

Songwriter Jason Lytle explained that much like Modesto's famous former resident, George Lucas, growing up "he had nothing better to do than dream up robots."

In the song, the inventors of the bona fide thinking, feeling robot lament leaving town and returning to find that Jed has raided the liquor cabinet and killed himself.

"Jed is a mechanical martyr with a message," said Lytle. "And his message is that alcohol and electronics do not mix."

The character of Jed also appears in three other songs by Grandaddy: Jed's Other Poem (Beautiful Ground) from the same album, in the song Jeddy 3's Poem from the EP Signal to Snow Ratio, and in the song Jed the 4th (which deals with Jed's alcoholic son) from the album Last Place.

== Personnel ==
- Jason Lytle - vocals, instrumental performance
