= Dave Rennick =

Australian singer-songwriter (born 1983)

- Birth name: David Wiley Rennick
- Born: 8 January 1983 (age 42) Australia
- Genres: Indie rock
- Occupation: Singer-songwriter
- Instruments: Vocals; guitar

David Wiley Rennick (born 8 January 1983) is an Australian singer-songwriter. Rennick is the co-front man and songwriter for indie rock band Dappled Cities and is also the founder and songwriter for indie super-group The Curse of Company. 2014 saw him performing solo under the name of Light Pressure releasing the tracks French Alps and U Know Me.

== Discography ==
=== Albums ===
with Dappled Cities

- A Smile (18 October 2004)
- Granddance (11 November 2006)
- Zounds (15 August 2009) No. 48 AUS
- Lake Air (21 July 2012) No. 41 AUS
- Many Roads (17 January 2014)

with The Curse of Company

- Leo Magnets Joins A Gang (17 June 2008)

=== Extended plays ===
with Dappled Cities

- Dead Bodies Where Their Mouths Were (2003)
- Wimbo Park (2004) – New Zealand-only
- Die in Your Eyes (2005) – Split EP with the Tucker B's
- A Crooked Smile (2006) – Remix EP

=== Singles ===
with Dappled Cities

- "Be Engine"/"Sputnik" (2002)
- "Chameleon Girl" (2003)
- "Peach" (2004)
- "Cream" (2004)
- "Fire Fire Fire" (2006)
- "Vision Bell" (2007)
- "Work It Out" (2007)
- "The Price" (2009)
- "Run with the Wind" (2012)
- "Born at the Right Time" (2012)
- "Many Roads" (2013)

with The Curse of Company

- "All The Mines" (2008)
- "Homecoming" (2008)

as Light Pressure

- U Know Me (2014)
- Silverland (2014)
