= Lampshades on Fire =

Single by Modest Mouse

from the album Strangers to Ourselves
- Released: December 15, 2014
- Recorded: 2013–14
- Genre: Alternative rock, indie rock
- Length: 3:08
- Label: Epic
- Songwriters: Isaac Brock, Jim Fairchild Jeremiah Green, Russell Higbee, Eric Judy, Joe Plummer, Tom Peloso

Modest Mouse singles chronology
"Perpetual Motion Machine" (2014)	"Lampshades on Fire" (2014)	"The Ground Walks, with Time in a Box" (2015)

"Lampshades on Fire" is a song by American alternative rock band Modest Mouse. It is the lead single from their sixth studio album Strangers to Ourselves (2015), released on December 15, 2014. This song as well as the entire Strangers to Ourselves album was mixed by Joe Zook.

A music video for the song was produced in November 2015 by director Jorges Torres Torres. It starred Natasha Lyonne, as well as several local bands from Athens, Georgia including "Muuy Biien, Ginko, Sad Dads, DIP, Monsoon and more."

== Charts ==
=== Weekly charts ===
Weekly chart performance for "Lampshades on Fire"
Chart (2014–2015)	Peak position
Mexico (Mexico Ingles Airplay)	42
Canada Rock (Billboard)	3
US Hot Rock & Alternative Songs (Billboard)	12
US Rock & Alternative Airplay (Billboard)	2

=== Year-end charts ===
Year-end chart performance for "Lampshades on Fire"
Chart (2015)	Position
US Hot Rock Songs (Billboard)	40
US Rock Airplay (Billboard)	16
