= Now It's On =

Single by Grandaddy

from the album Sumday
- B-side: "Trouble with a Capital T"; "Hey Cowboy, the Phone's for You"; "Getting Jipped"; "Yeah Is What We Had" (video)
- Released: 2003
- Recorded: 2003
- Genre: Indie rock
- Length: 4:08
- Label: V2
- Songwriter: Jason Lytle
- Producer: Jason Lytle

Grandaddy singles chronology
| "Hewlett's Daughter" (2000) | "Now It's On" (2003) | "Nature Anthem" (2004) |

"Now It's On" is a song by American indie rock band Grandaddy, released as the first single from their third studio album Sumday (2003).

== Release ==
It peaked at number 23 on the UK Singles Chart and #19 on the Adult Alternative Airplay chart, making it their only charting single in their native country.

== Covers ==
The song was covered by Bad Books in 2012.

== Track listing ==
7" vinyl

| No. | Title | Length |
|---|---|---|
| 1. | "Now It's On" |
| 2. | "Trouble with a Capital T" |

CD 1

| No. | Title | Length |
|---|---|---|
| 1. | "Now It's On (Edit)" |
| 2. | "Trouble with a Capital T" |
| 3. | "Hey Cowboy, the Phone's for You" |

CD 2

1. "Now It's On"
2. "Getting Jipped"
3. "Yeah Is What We Had" (video)

DVD

| No. | Title | Length |
|---|---|---|
| 1. | "Now It's On" |
| 2. | "Now It's Upside Down" (short film about the band) |

== Charts ==
| Chart (2003) | Peak position |
|---|---|
| UK Singles (Official Charts) | 23 |
| US Adult Alternative Airplay (Billboard) | 19 |
