= The Gift Machine =

The Gift Machine is an American band, led by the husband and wife team of Dave Matthies and Andrea Matthies. Originally based in the Pacific Northwest, Dave Matthies has collaborated with many different people and the band has gone through several line up changes over the years. From 1998-2006 he lived in Anacortes, Washington, and ran a recording studio at the now defunct venue, the Department of Safety. He also worked with Bret Lunsford of the low-fi pop band Beat Happening, running KNW-YR-OWN records and putting on the annual What the Heck Fest. Matthies has worked live and in the studio with the Microphones/Mount Eerie, Little Wings, the Begulls, Karl Blau, D+, LAKE, the Graves, Laura Veirs, Thanksgiving, and the Murder City Devils. The band is currently based in North County San Diego.

The Gift Machine has released six albums, two EPs, and several songs on compilations since the band first appeared in 1999, on labels such as KNW-YR-OWN, Happy Happy Birthday To Me Records and PIAPTK. Their 2003 release "...don't turn me off" spent several weeks in the CMJ top 200 and peaked at #136.
