= The Curse of Company =

- Origin: Sydney, Australia
- Genre: Indie Rock
- Years active: 2008 – Present
- Labels: Dangerbird; ABC Music
- Members: Wiley Rennick; Sarah Kelly; Jack Ladder; Danny Heifetz; Burke Reid
- Website: thecurseofcompany.com

The Curse of Company are a Sydney based indie rock band formed by David "Wiley" Rennick from the internationally celebrated Australian band Dappled Cities.

== Members ==
The band is a sort of Australian indie super-group comprising many successful indie artists:

- Wiley Rennick (vocals, guitar) a.k.a. Dave Rennick – Dappled Cities
- Sarah Kelly (vocals) – theredsunband
- Danny Heifetz (drums) – Mr Bungle and Secret Chiefs 3
- Burke Reid (co-producer/engineer) – Gerling
- Jack Ladder (bass)

== History ==
They released an album entitled "Leo Magnets Joins a Gang" in 2008. It was released by ABC Music in Australia and by the indie label Dangerbird Records in America. Their debut single "All The Mines" received airplay on the national broadcaster Triple J.
