= Through a Frosty Plate Glass E.P. =

EP by Grandaddy
- Released: 2001
- Genre: Indie rock
- Label: V2 Records
- Producer: Jason Lytle

Grandaddy chronology
The Sophtware Slump (2000)	Through a Frosty Plate Glass E.P. (2001)	Concrete Dunes (2002)

Through a Frosty Plate Glass E.P. is an EP by the indie rock band Grandaddy. It was released in 2001 on V2 Records. All of the songs had previously appeared as B-sides to the band's European singles.

== Release ==
Through a Frosty Plate Glass E.P. was released in 2001.

It was later included in some two-disc editions of The Sophtware Slump.

== Reception ==
Through a Frosty Plate Glass E.P. reached number 21 in the "Top 75" of CMJ New Music Monthly's August 2001 edition. Upon the 2011 release of the deluxe edition of The Sophtware Slump, BBC Music reviewer Mike Diver notes that "fans will be pleased to get their ears around material" from Through a Frosty Plate Glass E.P..

== Track listing ==
All tracks are written by Jason Lytle.

No.	Title	Length
1.	"First Movement/Message Fade"	3:48
2.	"Our Dying Brains"	4:43
3.	"What Can't Be Erased"	4:21
4.	"Wives of Farmers"	3:38
5.	"Street Bunny"	2:01
6.	"XD-Data II"	4:53

=== Personnel ===
- Jason Lytle – performer, production
- Gary Young – recording (track 7)
