= Natasha Wheat =

American artist (born 1981)

- Born: Natasha Rose Wheat; October 25, 1981 (age 44); Los Angeles, California
- Education: School of the Art Institute of Chicago
- Known for: Drawing, painting, sculpture, and performance
- Spouse: Jim Fairchild

Natasha Rose Wheat (born October 25, 1981) is an American interdisciplinary artist based in Ojai, California. She works in sculpture, painting, installation, and social practice. Her work often examines social structures, power dynamics and belief systems.

== Early life and education ==
Wheat grew up in Venice, California. She received her bachelor's degree in fine arts at the School of the Art Institute of Chicago. She also earned a master's in fine arts from the California College of the Arts.

== Career ==
Wheat is the founder of Project Grow, an art studio and urban farming program that began in Portland, Oregon, in 2008 and involved collaborations with developmentally disabled adults, addressing issues of labor, community, farming and art. Her work has been exhibited at institutions including the Museum of Contemporary Art, Chicago; the Berkeley Art Museum and Pacific Film Archive; and the Detroit Institute of Arts.

== Selected works ==
- Hit with Bricks
- Be Oblivion in Disconnect
- Field Without Color
- A History of Violence
