= He's Simple, He's Dumb, He's the Pilot. =

2000 single by Grandaddy

Single by Grandaddy

from the album The Sophtware Slump
- Released: 2000
- Genre: Indie rock
- Label: V2
- Songwriter(s): Jason Lytle

Grandaddy singles chronology
"Hewlett's Daughter" (2000)	"He's Simple, He's Dumb, He's the Pilot." (2000)	"El Caminos in the West" (2003)

"He's Simple, He's Dumb, He's the Pilot." is a song by American indie rock band Grandaddy, released as the third single from their second studio album The Sophtware Slump (2000).

== Writing and composition ==
Regarding the song's conception and its position as The Sophtware Slump's opening track, Jason Lytle noted: "It was definitely a struggle to get all the three parts to actually sound like they were intended to live together. I usually get into this space where, once the album starts to come together, I start to figure out what's missing or what needs to be added, and I realised that it really needed something like that to set it off in a certain direction. It's just a struggle putting something like that together and making it not sound forced, y’know?"

== Release ==
"He's Simple, He's Dumb, He's the Pilot." was released as the third single from The Sophtware Slump. It reached number 82 in the UK Singles Chart.

== Touring ==
Grandaddy toured with Elliott Smith in 2000 and he would occasionally join them onstage and sing lead vocals on parts of this song.

== Legacy ==
The song was featured on the soundtrack of UK hidden camera show Trigger Happy TV and the films Jackpot (2001), The Forest for the Trees (2003), and Occupation: Dreamland (2005).

Actor Jason Lee has cited this song as the inspiration to name his child Pilot Inspektor.

== Track listing ==
No.	Title	Length
1.	"He's Simple, He's Dumb, He's the Pilot."	8:56
2.	"Wives of Farmers"	3:40
3.	"N. Blender"	3:59
