= Zounds (Dappled Cities album) =

Studio album by Dappled Cities
- Released: 15 August 2009
- Recorded: Sydney, New York City
- Genre: Alternative
- Length: 55:42
- Labels: Speak 'n Spell; Dangerbird Records
- Producer: Chris Coady

Dappled Cities chronology
Granddance (2006)	Zounds (2009)	Lake Air (2012)

Professional ratings
Review scores
Source	Rating
Allmusic	3/5 stars
Pitchfork Media	(7.8/10)

Zounds is the third album by Australian rock band Dappled Cities, released in Australia on 15 August 2009 and worldwide on 15 September through Dangerbird Records. The album comes two years after their previous release, Granddance. At this point, the band had uprooted from their home of Sydney and settled in the United States. They shot videos in Wyoming gas stations, played impromptu gigs in South Dakota sound factories, partied with Hugh Jackman and Steve Malkmus and filmed a 26-episode children's odyssey for Disney called ‘Alphabreaks’.

The band used new electric guitars and imported a Gakken — a $40 build-it-yourself cardboard synthesiser from Japan — on all 12 songs. The band also hired three mixers for Zounds — Coady, Scott Horscroft and Wayne Connolly.

== Track listing ==
(All songs written, arranged and performed by Dappled Cities)

1. "Hold Your Back" – 4:46
2. "Answer Is Zero" – 3:54
3. "The Price" – 4:33
4. "Wooden Ships" – 4:59
5. "Slow for Me, My Island" – 4:44
6. "The Night Is Young at Heart" – 5:24
7. "Miniature Alas" – 4:35
8. "Don't Stop There" – 3:51
9. "Kid" – 4:29
10. "Middle People" – 4:20
11. "Apart" – 4:48
12. "Stepshadows" – 5:27

=== iTunes bonus track version ===
1. "Fire Fire Fire" (Live Performance)
2. "Beach Song" (Live Performance)
3. "Grandance" (Live Performance)
4. "Peach Song" (Live Performance)

== Personnel ==
=== Musicians ===
Dappled Cities
Ned Cooke
Tim Derricourt
Allan Kumpulainen
Alex Moore
David Rennick

Others:
Alex Love – French Horn
Madeleine Hawcroft – Flute
Sebastian Ranguis, Des Miller, Kim Waldock, Ned Cooke – Strings

=== Other Personnel ===
Produced by: Chris Coady and Dappled Cities
Engineered by: Simon Berckelman
Assistant Engineered by: Jean-Paul Fung
Mixed by: Chris Coady ("Hold Your Back", "The Night Is Young At Heart", "Don't Stop There", "Middle People", "Apart", "Stepshadows"), Wayne Connolly ("The Price", "Slow For Me, My Island", "Miniature Alas", "Don't Stop There"), Scott Horscroft ("Answer Is Zero", "Wooden Ships", "Slow For Me, My Island", "Middle People"), Dappled Cities
Mastered by: Louie Teran
A&R by: Justin Meldal-Johnsen
Dangerbird Records: Jeff Castelaz, Peter Walker
Design by: Tim Rogers
Photography by: Wilk

== Reception ==
The album received positive reviews, described as retro-futuristic and having emotional depth. Pitchfork's review of the album stated that "Dappled Cities haven't quite acquired a big reputation outside their homeland yet, but it seems likely they will. If they keep making big, boisterous records like this that are unafraid to be a little ridiculous in places, they'll have to."
