= The Ground Walks, with Time in a Box =

Single by Modest Mouse

from the album Strangers to Ourselves
- Released: March 14, 2015
- Genre: Dance-punk
- Length: 6:12
- Label: Epic
- Songwriters: Isaac Brock, Jeremiah Green, Russell Higbee, Lisa Molinaro, Tom Peloso

Modest Mouse singles chronology
"Lampshades on Fire" (2014)	"The Ground Walks, with Time in a Box" (2015)

"The Ground Walks, with Time in a Box" is a song by American alternative rock band Modest Mouse. It is the second single from their sixth studio album Strangers to Ourselves.

== Weekly charts ==
Chart (2015)	Peak position
US Rock & Alternative Airplay (Billboard)	31
US Alternative Airplay (Billboard)	19
