= Strangers to Ourselves =

Studio album by Modest Mouse
- Released: March 17, 2015
- Recorded: 2014
- Studios: Ice Cream Party (Portland, Oregon)
- Genres: Indie rock; alternative rock; indie pop
- Length: 57:10
- Label: Epic
- Producers: Isaac Brock; Tucker Martine; Brian Deck; Andrew Weiss; Clay Jones

Modest Mouse chronology
No One's First, and You're Next (2009)	Strangers to Ourselves (2015)	The Golden Casket (2021)

Singles from Strangers to Ourselves
- 1. "Lampshades on Fire" Released: December 15, 2014; 2. "The Ground Walks, with Time in a Box" Released: March 17, 2015

Strangers to Ourselves is the sixth studio album by American alternative rock band Modest Mouse, which was released on March 17, 2015, two weeks after its initially announced release date of March 3. The album was leaked to the internet on March 7, 2015. On March 16, 2015, the day before the album's official release date, Strangers to Ourselves was made available for download on Amazon.com (free for Prime) and the iTunes Store.

It is the band's first studio album since We Were Dead Before the Ship Even Sank, released in 2007, marking the longest gap between studio albums in their career. It also is the first album following the departure of founding bass player Eric Judy. Modest Mouse recorded two albums' worth of material in their sessions, though the second album still has several songs incomplete.

Joe Zook, who mixed We Were Dead Before the Ship Even Sank, also mixed Strangers To Ourselves.

== Singles ==
The first single from the album, "Lampshades on Fire", was made available on December 15, 2014 for streaming and digital download. Another song from the album, "Coyotes", was made available for download on January 20, 2015. The third song to be made available, "The Best Room", was released on February 3, 2015, alongside the album's track listing. A fourth track from the album, "The Ground Walks, with Time in a Box", was released on February 16, 2015. On March 3, a fifth song from the album was released, the album's final track, "Of Course We Know".

== Reception ==
Professional ratings
Aggregate scores
Source	Rating
AnyDecentMusic?	6.7/10
Metacritic	70/100
Review scores
Source	Rating
AllMusic	3/5 stars
The A.V. Club	B+
Entertainment Weekly	A
The Guardian	3/5 stars
NME	7/10
Pitchfork	6.4/10
Q	3/5 stars
Rolling Stone	3.5/5 stars
Spin	5/10
Uncut	8/10

Strangers to Ourselves received both middling and positive reviews. The album holds a score of 70 out of 100 from Metacritic based on "generally favorable reviews". While some lament the title's lack of experimentation and growth, other reviewers see the album as evidence of the band's evolution. Kyle McGovern of Spin calls the album "a rudderless 15-song set that slightly improves the standing of 2007's middle-of-the-moat We Were Dead Before the Ship Even Sank." Stephen Thomas Erlewine from AllMusic emphasises the strengths of the album's songs individually, but adds that "it's an album where the trees matter more than the forest."

== Track listing ==
All lyrics are written by Isaac Brock, except "God Is an Indian and You're an Asshole" lyrics by Jeremiah Green. Music credits per ASCAP Repertory.

No.	Title	Music	Length
1.	"Strangers to Ourselves"	Brock, Green, Russell Higbee, Eric Judy, Lisa Molinaro, Tom Peloso	3:24
2.	"Lampshades on Fire"	Brock, Jim Fairchild, Green, Judy, Peloso	3:08
3.	"Shit in Your Cut"	Brock, Green, Higbee, Peloso	4:44
4.	"Pistol (A. Cunanan, Miami, FL. 1996)"	Brock, Green, Higbee, Peloso	3:42
5.	"Ansel"	Brock, Fairchild, Green, Higbee, Peloso	2:56
6.	"The Ground Walks, with Time in a Box"	Brock, Green, Higbee, Molinaro, Peloso	6:12
7.	"Coyotes"	Brock, Dann Gallucci, Green, Higbee, Judy	3:31
8.	"Pups to Dust"	Brock, Green, Higbee, Judy, Peloso	3:31
9.	"Sugar Boats"	Brock, Fairchild, Green, Higbee, Judy, Peloso	4:03
10.	"Wicked Campaign"	Brock, Fairchild, Gallucci, Green, Higbee	3:34
11.	"Be Brave"	Brock, Fairchild, Green, Higbee, Peloso	3:31
12.	"God Is an Indian and You're an Asshole"	Brock, Fairchild, Green, Peloso	1:17
13.	"The Tortoise and the Tourist"	Brock, Gallucci, Green, Higbee, Judy	3:41
14.	"The Best Room"	Brock, Fairchild, Green, Seth Lorinczi	4:25
15.	"Of Course We Know"	Brock, Green, Higbee, Peloso	5:24
Total length:			57:10

=== Vinyl edition ===
Side one
No.	Title	Length
1.	"Strangers to Ourselves"	3:24
2.	"Lampshades on Fire"	3:08
3.	"Shit in Your Cut"	4:44
4.	"Pistol (A. Cunanan, Miami, FL. 1996)"	3:42

Side two
No.	Title	Length
1.	"Ansel"	2:56
2.	"The Ground Walks, with Time in a Box"	6:12
3.	"Coyotes"	3:31
4.	"God Is an Indian and You're an Asshole"	1:17

Side three
No.	Title	Length
1.	"Sugar Boats"	4:03
2.	"Wicked Campaign"	3:34
3.	"Be Brave"	3:31
4.	"Pups to Dust"	3:31

Side four
No.	Title	Length
1.	"The Tortoise and the Tourist"	3:41
2.	"The Best Room"	4:25
3.	"Of Course We Know"	5:24
Total length:		57:10

== Personnel ==
=== Modest Mouse ===
- Isaac Brock – vocals, guitar, twelve-string, piano, Rhodes, Mellotron, bass, EBow, baritone guitar, Korg MS-20
- Jeremiah Green – drums, conga, sequencers, electronic drums, djembe, death whistle, vibes, Korg, kalimba, cigar box guitar, backing vocals
- Tom Peloso – bass, synth, Rhodes, piano, upright piano, cornet, kalimba, acoustic guitar, backing vocals
- Jim Fairchild – guitar, Rhodes, ukulele, backing vocals
- Russell Higbee – bass, Rhodes, upright bass, guitar, pump organ, vibes, electric piano, baritone guitar, euphonium, kalimba, cornet, organ, backing vocals
- Lisa Molinaro – viola, cello, bass, vocals
- Ben Massarella – percussion
- Darrin Wiener – Modular synthesizer, field recordings, machine sequencing

=== Additional instrumentation ===
- James Mercer – vocals
- Dann Gallucci – drum machine, guitar, acoustic guitar, sequencing, synthesizers
- Jose Medeles – drums, percussion, vibes
- William Slater – banjo on "The Ground Walks, with Time in a Box", piano, Rhodes, Modular synth, backing vocals
- Maureen Pandos – upright bass
- Tristan Forney – tuba
- Corrina Repp – backing vocals
- Jeremy Sherrer – timbales, MPC programming, backing vocals
- Tucker Martine – percussion
- Seth Lorinczi – bass
- Ryan Baldoz – backwards bass
- Davey Brozowski – percussion

== Charts ==
=== Weekly charts ===
Chart (2015)	Peak position
Australian Albums (ARIA)	15
Austrian Albums (Ö3 Austria)	40
Belgian Albums (Ultratop Flanders)	125
Belgian Albums (Ultratop Wallonia)	192
German Albums (Offizielle Top 100)	47
New Zealand Albums (RMNZ)	39
Scottish Albums (Official Charts)	31
Swiss Albums (Schweizer Hitparade)	96
UK Albums (Official Charts)	28
US Billboard 200	3
US Top Rock Albums (Billboard)	1

=== Year-end charts ===
Chart (2015)	Position
US Top Rock Albums (Billboard)	24
