= So Wrong It's Right =

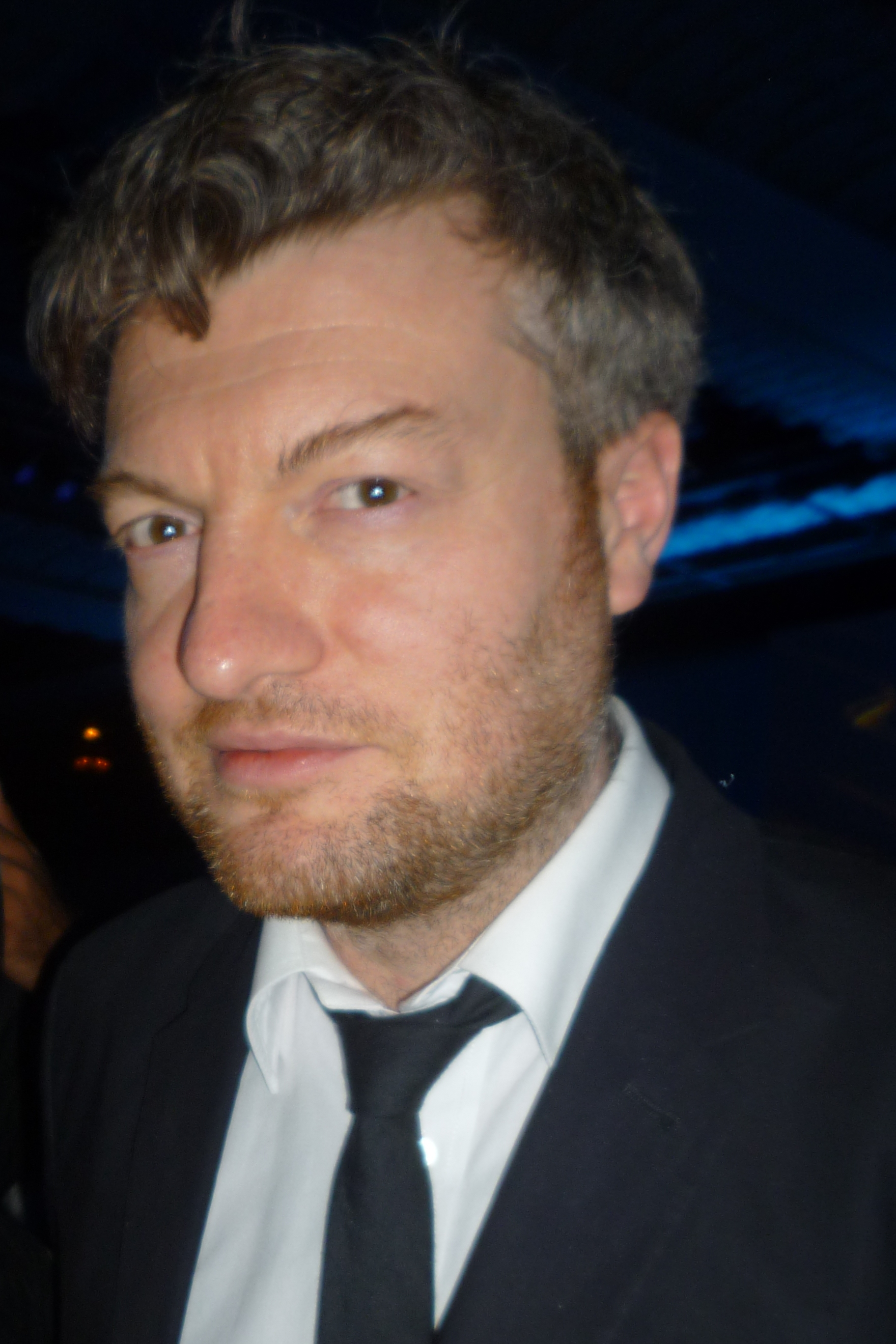
- Host Charlie Brooker
- Genre: Panel game
- Running time: 30 minutes
- Country of origin: United Kingdom
- Language(s): English
- Home station: BBC Radio 4
- Hosted by: Charlie Brooker
- Produced by: Aled Evans
- Executive producer(s): Ben Caudell
- Original release: 11 May 2010 – 20 June 2012
- No. of series: 3
- No. of episodes: 17
- Opening theme: "Summer Here Kids" by Grandaddy
- Ending theme: "Summer Here Kids" by Grandaddy
- Website: www.bbc.co.uk/programmes/b01jrjq8

So Wrong It's Right is a British radio programme presented by Charlie Brooker in which panelists aim to give the "most wrong" answer to a question. They describe stories from their lives, conceive of new ideas on a theme and criticise aspects of the modern world. It aired three series in May–June 2010, March–April 2011 and May–June 2012 on BBC Radio 4. The first series of five episodes played at 11 p.m. while the last two had six episodes premiering at 6:30 p.m.

== Format ==
Presenter Charlie Brooker awards a point to whichever of his three guests has the "most wrong" answer to each question asked. The first round, "Wrong Time, Wrong Place", sees each guest describing an anecdote from their lives on a particular theme. The second round, "Do Your Worst", has contestants come up with ideas on a theme—for instance, to create the worst sport at the Olympics. In an alternate second round, "This Putrid Modern Hell", panelists discuss what in the modern world is most annoying to them. "Random Wrongness"—the final round—is a sequence of quickfire questions.

== Production ==
The programme aired on BBC Radio 4 in three series from 2010 to 2012. The first series aired at 11 p.m. while the remaining two aired at 6 p.m. In advance of series three, Brooker estimated to Radio Times that each 30-minute episode takes around an hour to record. As the show aired pre-watershed in its last two series, ruder discussions by panelists were cut out of the final edit.

== Episodes ==
=== Series 1 ===
No. overall	No. in series	Guests	Winner	Original release date
1	1	Victoria Coren Mitchell, Rufus Hound and David Mitchell	David Mitchell	11 May 2010
2	2	Tom Basden, Josie Long and Lee Mack	Josie Long	18 May 2010
3	3	Richard Herring, Iain Morris and Holly Walsh	Holly Walsh	25 May 2010
4	4	Richard Herring, Liza Tarbuck and Jack Whitehall	Richard Herring	1 June 2010
5	5	Lee Mack, Sarah Millican and Iain Morris	Sarah Millican	8 June 2010

=== Series 2 ===
No. overall	No. in series	Guests	Winner	Original release date
6	1	Rufus Hound, Holly Walsh and Mark Watson	Mark Watson	10 March 2011
7	2	Jon Richardson, Frank Skinner and Isy Suttie	Jon Richardson	17 March 2011
8	3	Shappi Khorsandi, Lee Mack and David Schneider	Lee Mack	24 March 2011
9	4	Fergus Craig, Sharon Horgan and Rufus Hound	Fergus Craig	31 March 2011
10	5	Josie Long, Daniel Maier and Frank Skinner	Frank Skinner	7 April 2011
11	6	Graham Linehan, Lee Mack, Sarah Millican	Sarah Millican	14 April 2011

=== Series 3 ===
No. overall	No. in series	Guests	Winner	Original release date
12	1	Susan Calman, Lee Mack and Daniel Maier	Daniel Maier	16 May 2012
13	2	Barry Cryer, Lee Mack and Holly Walsh	Holly Walsh	23 May 2012
14	3	Matthew Crosby, Graham Linehan and Helen Zaltzman	Helen Zaltzman	30 May 2012
15	4	Graham Linehan, Isy Suttie and Holly Walsh	Graham Linehan	6 June 2012
16	5	Susan Calman, Miles Jupp and Shaun Pye	Miles Jupp	13 June 2012
17	6	Rob Beckett, Susan Calman and Richard Osman	Richard Osman	20 June 2012

== Reception ==
Chris Maume of The Independent enjoyed the pilot, praising "David Mitchell's profound disgruntlement" at modern technology. Maume said that though others criticised the "nastiness", he "could have handled more", suggesting that "Brooker's misanthropy dial was only turned up half way". In The Guardian, Elisabeth Mahoney found it "initially unsettling" to hear the "funny but breathtakingly dark comic vision" of the first episode on BBC Radio 4, describing Brooker as "bitterly acerbic". Stephanie Billen, a writer for The Observer, said that the premise "sounds like only half an idea", but that "there are plenty of laugh-aloud moments". The Guardian's Camilla Redmond wrote of the first series, "the powers of Charlie Brooker's persuasiveness are showcased in all their splendour".

In Radio Times, Ron Hewitt praised of the second series that Brooker is "a master at highlighting the comedy of the dark side", doing it in "a warm, mutually-inclusive, sharing way that's curiously uplifting. And funny". Billen reiterated that "something about the concept does not quite add up", and that the programme in practice was "entertaining mini-monologues about bad experiences or more general disasters", but that it had "guaranteed laughs" with its line-up.

Reviewing the third series, Hewitt said: "you'll laugh your socks off". Gillian Reynolds of The Telegraph said that Brooker would polarise the audience, saying "as many listening to this reversal-of-convention panel game will loathe chairman Charlie Brooker as love his iconoclasm". The Observer's Miranda Sawyer characterised it as a "strange show", because Brooker is "a scurrilously witty man, but his humour ... lies in his anger" and the programme is not suited to this. Sawyer criticised that the show is "actually about comedians shoe-horning little bits of their routines on to the radio".
