= Nature Anthem =

Single by Grandaddy

from the album Below the Radio
- Released: 2004
- Genre: Indie pop
- Label: Ultra
- Songwriter(s): Jason Lytle

Grandaddy singles chronology
"Now It's On" (2003)	"Nature Anthem" (2004)	"Elevate Myself" (2006)

"Nature Anthem" is a song by American indie rock band Grandaddy, released as a single in 2004 in conjunction with the album Below the Radio.

== Music video ==
Its music video features people out in nature dressed up in animal costumes.

== Legacy ==
The title song was played in a Honda Civic Hybrid television commercial in 2005, and Coca-Cola's summer advertising campaign in 2006.

== Track listing ==
No.	Title	Length
1.	"Nature Anthem"	3:31
