= Below the Radio =

Mixtape by Grandaddy
- Released: 2004
- Genre: Indie rock
- Label: Ultra

Grandaddy chronology
| Sumday (2003) | Below the Radio (2004) | Excerpts from the Diary of Todd Zilla (2005) |

Below the Radio is a mixtape put together by Jason Lytle of American indie rock band Grandaddy, released in 2004 by record label Ultra. The album also included a new Grandaddy track, "Nature Anthem".

== Background ==
Ultra Records had approached Grandaddy frontman Jason Lytle via his management some time earlier with the idea for him to compile a mixtape, and he decided to include tracks that he considered "sleeper hits", identifying a common theme: "They all seem to have pretty conventional and familiar chord progressions. They all have vivid imagery for me with their words. There also seems to be a bit of sadness, but not necessarily despair."

== Reception ==
Professional ratings
Review scores
| Source | Rating |
|---|---|
| AllMusic | 3.5/5 stars |
| Pitchfork | 7.3/10 |

AllMusic's Matt Collar stated the album "plays like a K-Tel commercial for Gen X sad-sackism", calling it "pretty cool". Brian Howe of Pitchfork wrote "for the most part, the songs [Lytle] selected sound quite a bit like his own band. Lush yet sleek and slightly sterile is the dominant style of Below the Radio".

== Track listing ==
1. Beck – "We Live Again"
2. Beulah – "Burned by the Sun"
3. Earlimart – "Color Bars"
4. Snow Patrol – "Run"
5. Goldenboy – "Wild Was The Night"
6. Giant Sand – "Bottom Line Man"
7. Fruit Bats – "The Little Acorn"
8. Home – "Comin' Up Empty Again"
9. Jackpot – "If We Could Go Backwards"
10. The Handsome Family – "I Fell"
11. Little Wings – "Sand Canyon"
12. Pavement – "Motion Suggests"
13. Blonde Redhead – "For the Damaged"
14. Virgil Shaw – "Twisted Layer"
15. Grandaddy – "Nature Anthem"
