= A Pretty Mess by This One Band =

EP by Grandaddy
- Released: 1996
- Genre: Indie rock
- Label: Will

Grandaddy chronology
| A Pretty Mess by This One Band (1996) | Under the Western Freeway (1997) |

A Pretty Mess by This One Band is an EP by American indie rock band Grandaddy, released in April 1996 through record label Will. It includes several songs taken from the band's earlier cassette-only release Complex Party Come Along Theories.

== Release ==
A Pretty Mess by This One Band was released in April 1996 by record label Will. Its songs were reissued in 2002 on the album The Broken Down Comforter Collection.

== Reception ==
Professional ratings
Review scores
| Source | Rating |
|---|---|
| AllMusic | 3/5 stars |

AllMusic writer Dean Carlson gave it a three-star review, describing it as "a decent litmus test for the group's own potential. Definitely not as pretty as the title might suggest, but still one of the better – although flawed – messes from America's indie underground", comparing it to Pavement, Pixies and Yo La Tengo. Guitarist Jim Fairchild put the similarities to Pavement down to their recording budget: "We had very meager means when we recorded our first album for Will Records, so it's naturally going to sound more lackadaisical and sloppy than our current records."

== Track listing ==
All tracks written by Jason Lytle.

1. "Away Birdies with Special Sounds"
2. "Taster"
3. "Peeano"
4. "Kim You Bore Me to Death"
5. "Pre-Merced"
6. "Gentle Spike Resort"
7. "Egg Hit and Jack Too"
