= Blu Wav =

Studio album by Grandaddy
- Released: February 16, 2024
- Genre: Indie rock; bluegrass/new wave waltzes; alt country
- Length: 45:02
- Label: Dangerbird
- Producer: Jason Lytle

Grandaddy chronology
The Sophtware Slump ..... On a Wooden Piano (2020)	Blu Wav (2024)

Singles from Blu Wav
- 1. "Watercooler" Released: October 25, 2023; 2. "Cabin in My Mind" Released: December 1, 2023

"It takes a lot of restraint to have this much restlessness within you and still make an album that's snoozy... It can be an okay thing, restlessness. It can be just as good as it can be bad. I think the subject of things changing and there being a bit of unrest in your life, that just leads to great stuff. But you can get addicted to not being happy with where you're at, which is something to consider."

—Jason Lytle on the themes in Blu Wav

Blu Wav is the sixth studio album by American indie rock band Grandaddy. Released on February 16, 2024, through Dangerbird Records, it marks their first album in nearly seven years since Last Place, as well as their first since the death of bassist Kevin Garcia. The album's title is a portmanteau of the genres bluegrass and new wave. It has been preceded by the singles "Watercooler" and "Cabin in My Mind".

== Reception ==
According to the review aggregator Metacritic, Blu Wav received "generally favorable reviews" based on a weighted average score of 78 out of 100 from fourteen critic scores. Editors at AllMusic rated this album 3.5 out of 5 stars, with critic Tim Sendra writing "if it's introspective, somewhat epic country rock balladry one desires, then Blu Wav might be just the thing" as "it's certainly the band's most focused record to date". At BrooklynVegan, Bill Pearis called this "Grandaddy's mellowest record ever, but also maybe their most interstellar" and this was shortlisted as one of the best albums of February 2024. Shawn Donohue of Glide Magazine characterized this as "a solid, restrained offering and a fitting coda to their catalog" in response to rumors that this may be the final Grandaddy album. In The Guardian, Stevie Chick gave this album 4 out of 5 stars for combining "seductive joy" and "soft-focus happy-sadness is an addictive pleasure all its own". The Line of Best Fit's Will Yarbrough gave Blu Wav a 6 out of 10, praising how the music "updates Grandaddy's core sound without overwriting the quirks in their circuitry", but critiquing that it "sticks to [its] framework a little too rigidly".

Sean Fennell of Paste criticized this album in light of the strength of other Grandaddy albums, but noted several highlights that leave the release "uneven". Pitchfork's Arielle Gordon gave this album an 8.0 out of 10 for Jason Lytle's "mix of humor and tragedy", with an album that "has a calmness and ease, even as [he] sings about feeling miserable". Writing for PopMatters, Chris Conaton characterized this album as "mixed results" and gave it a 6 out of 10 for being "an interesting experiment not to attempt to find the balance at all". The Skinny's Joe Goggins characterized Blu Wav as "a startlingly assured embrace of alt-country" where "the rustic feel is front and centre" and gave it 4 out of 5 stars. In a profile for Stereogum, Danielle Chelosky wrote that this release has "devastating lyrics" mixed with a "sound [that] is placid and hopeful" with "a layer of nostalgic beauty". Laura Barton of Uncut rated Blu Wav 4 out of 5 stars, summing up "The effect is to send the listener into a kind of emotional, geographical and chronological freefall, as if we might be passing through any decade, state or era in recent American history. A little lost, a little lovelorn, in hope of a place to land."

A May 1 review of the best music of 2024 from Pitchfork included this album. A June 3 roundup of the best albums of the year in Spin included Blu Wav and Jonah Bayer stated that "Jason Lytle might sound better now than when the group supported Elliott Smith back in the early 2000s".

== Track listing ==
All songs written by Jason Lytle.

1. "Blu Wav" – 1:05
2. "Cabin in My Mind" – 3:30
3. "Long as I'm Not the One" – 4:35
4. "You're Going to Be Fine and I'm Going to Hell" – 4:45
5. "Watercooler" – 4:26
6. "Let's Put this Pinto on the Moon" – 1:26
7. "On a Train or Bus" – 3:37
8. "Jukebox App" – 4:37
9. "Yeehaw AI in the Year 2025" – 1:29
10. "Ducky, Boris and Dart" – 3:32
11. "East Yosemite" – 4:23
12. "Nothin' to Lose" – 4:55
13. "Blu Wav Buh Bye" – 1:42

== Personnel ==
Grandaddy

- Jason Lytle – vocals, instrumentation, production, mixing, cover art

Additional personnel

- Francie Chang – layout, design
- Aaron Espinoza – recording
- Max Hart – pedal steel guitar
- Tucker Martine – mixing
- Ruairi O'Flaherty – mastering at Nomograph Mastering
- Chris Pace – additional recording and assistance
- Brian Rosemeyer – additional recording and assistance

== Charts ==
Chart performance for Blu Wav
Chart (2024)	Peak position
Belgian Albums (Ultratop Flanders)	8
Swiss Albums (Schweizer Hitparade)	73
UK Albums (OCC)	93

== See also ==
- 2024 in American music
- List of 2024 albums
