= John Wayne Shot Me =

Indie band

John Wayne Shot Me was an indie band from Ammerzoden, the Netherlands.

== History ==
John Wayne Shot Me was formed by Thijs van den Broek in 1998, originally as a one-man recording only project. When his songs received positive reviews in several small underground music magazines, John Wayne Shot Me was asked to perform live. Thijs then decided to form a band with his friends Merijn van Pelt, Geert van Beers and his sister Marieke van den Broek. Soon the band signed to the Belgian label Ines Boukov/62TV Records and many releases and shows all over Europe followed.

Allegedly due to a legal issue about their bandname with the inheritors of actor Marion Michael Morrison, also known as John Wayne, the band decided to split up in December 2006 . They played their last concert in 's-Hertogenbosch, the city where the bandmembers met in highschool.

John Wayne Shot Me was known for their short melodic twisted popsongs about love, technology and monsters. Most songs featured (samples of) toy instruments and outdated gameconsoles. The band released 3 albums and some singles, including a split 7-inch with the Californian band Grandaddy. The band also worked with Kimya Dawson, Julia P Hersheimer, Austin Lace and many others.

== Line-up ==
- Thijs van den Broek – vocals, guitars, electronics
- Marieke van den Broek – vocals, keyboards, guitars, electronics
- Geert van Beers – vocals, drums
- Merijn van Pelt – bass guitar

Occasionally the following people are mentioned as band members as well:

- Fred Stiens keyboards
- Emilio the friendly robot a plastic robot that accompanied the band on stage

== Selective discography ==
- John Wayne Shot Me – (self released, 1998) (cassette)
- Swinging with ines – (Ines Boukov Records, 1999) (split CD album with Poney and Super Prestige)
- The artificial octopus cassette – (self released, 1999) (cassette)
- John Wayne Shot Me / Grandaddy split 7-inch (Ines Boukov Records/62TV Records, 2000)(split 7-inch with Grandaddy)
- Flying Time – (Octane Foil, 2000) (compilation 7-inch featuring Charlottefield, A Series Of Wheels, Johnny Domino and John Wayne Shot vs Blimey!)
- Fortran catapult – (62TV Records, 2001) (CD album)
- Fortran catapult – (Octane Foil, 2001) (vinyl album, alternate track list)
- Let sleeping monsters sleep – (62TV Records, 2004) (CD EP)
- The purple hearted youth club – (62TV Records, 2005) (CD Album)

Exclusive tracks on compilations:

- "r2d2 won't you come" on Les enfants children – (Purderous Magina, 1999)
- "a sale all" in (track with blimey!) on But you don't really care about music, do you? – (LVR, 2003)
- "i love perth" on everything's ending here (tribute to Pavement – (Homesleep, 2003)
- "waiting for the moon to rise" on a century of covers (tribute to Belle and Sebastian) – (Kirsten's Postcard, 2006)
