= Granddance =

Studio album by Dappled Cities Fly
- Released: 11 November 2006(AUS); 1 March 2007(U.S.)
- Recorded: Los Angeles (July, 2006)
- Genre: Indie rock
- Length: 45:06
- Labels: Speak 'n Spell; Dangerbird Records; Universal Music Australia
- Producers: Peter Walker; Jim Fairchild

Dappled Cities Fly chronology
A Smile (2004)	Granddance (2006)	Zounds (2009)

Granddance is the second album by Australian band Dappled Cities Fly, released in 2006. The album was recorded at Sunset Sound, Sanora Recorders and New Monkey Studios in Los Angeles in July 2006 and produced by Jim Fairchild (Grandaddy) and Peter Walker. Guests on the album include Mark Bradshaw on keyboards and Bjorn Baillie (La Rocca), Peter Walker, and Jim Fairchild on vocals.

Track 2 of the bonus CD was recorded during the Grandance sessions in Los Angeles in July 2006. Track 3 was recorded at Rostrevor in at the band's hometown Sydney in September 2005. Tracks 4 and 5 were recorded live for Triple J's Home & Hosed program by Linda Radclyffe and Cameron McCauley at the Annandale Hotel in Sydney on June 21, 2006.

== Track listing ==
(All songs written, arranged and performed by Dappled Cities)

1. "Holy Chord" – 4:23
2. "Work It Out" – 3:35
3. "Fire Fire Fire" – 3:48
4. "Colour Coding" – 4:25
5. "Beach Song" – 3:55
6. "Vision Bell" – 3:47
7. "The Eve the Girl" – 4:02
8. "Granddance" – 3:37
9. "Within Hours" – 4:17
10. "Watercourse" – 3:52
11. "Battlewon" – 3:37

=== Bonus CD ===
1. "Paint the Walls"
2. "Save Your Money"
3. "Granddance" (2005 demo)
4. "The Birds" (video)
5. "Peach" (video)

== Personnel ==
=== Musicians ===
Dave Rennick - Guitar, Vocals
Tim Derricourt - Guitar, Vocals
Ned Cooke - Keyboard, Sampler
Alex Moore - Bass Guitar
Hugh Boyce - Drums
Mark Bradshaw - Keys ("Holy Chord", "Work It Out", "Fire Fire Fire", "The Eve The Girl", "Within Hours"), Vocals ("Holy Chord")
Bjorn Baillie - Vocals ("Battlewon")
Peter Walker/Jim Fairchild - sing, shout and bang things (here-there-and-everywhere)

=== Other Personnel ===
Produced by: Jim Fairchild and Peter Walker
Recorded and Engineered by: Mike Cresswell
Recorded at: Sunset Sound, Sonora Recorders, New Monkey Studios
Mixed by: Jacquire King
Mastered by: Dave Cooley
A&R by: Jeff Castelaz and Peter Walker
Artwork by: Cole Gerst
Design by: White Mope

== Reviews ==
Professional ratings
Review scores
Source	Rating
Allmusic	link
APRA	link
Pitchfork Media	(7.8/10) link

WebWombat.com said, "While Dappled Cities may not be locals, there is definitely a familiar tone to their sweet and hypnotic tunes. Much like a lot of the music coming out of California these days (you'll hear a good number of similarities to bands like Weezer, The Shins, Hello Goodbye or The Thrills) the latest tunes from DC are remarkably catchy, and remarkably indie." (Rating: 3/5)

TinyMixTapes.com said, "Dappled Cities offer indie pop aspiring for the epic sweep of such neo-psychedelians as The Flaming Lips and Mercury Rev. All the ingredients are (in Granddance) for something transcendent, but their sonic balloon floats too closely to the ground. What keeps them from achieving those chemically enhanced heights is a sobreity that trumps the sense of abandon necessary for any full lift off." (Rating: 2.5/5 stars)

LAist.com said, "Their release, Granddance, on LA's Dangerbird Records, is 11 tracks of well-crafted quirkiness."

The Onion A/V Club said, "Throughout Granddance, Dappled Cities favor martial drums and grand gestures, looking to capture the bigness and dewy wonder of acts like The Flaming Lips, The Shins, and The New Pornographers." (Grade: B)

PlugInMusic.com said, "There is a liveliness and a whimsy in Dappled Cities' sophomore album 'Granddance.' From the playful falsetto vocals that so frequently float over the shrill melodies which soar throughout most of the album, the Australian band are indie pop that brings to mind The Decemberists. What is more, the band can boast that former Grandaddy guitarist − now All Smiles frontman − Jim Fairchild and Peter Walker produced 'Granddance' along with Jacquire King (Modest Mouse, Tom Waits). Talk about some indie rock namedropping." (Grade: B+)
