= A.M. 180 =

1998 single by Grandaddy

Single by Grandaddy

from the album Under the Western Freeway
- Released: 20 February 1998
- Recorded: 1997
- Genre: Indie rock
- Length: 3:20
- Label: Will
- Songwriter: Jason Lytle
- Producer: Jason Lytle

Grandaddy singles chronology
"Summer Here Kids" (1998)	"A.M. 180" (1998)	"The Crystal Lake" (2000)

"A.M. 180" is a song by American indie rock band Grandaddy from their debut studio album, Under the Western Freeway, released in 1997. It features a cover of Pavement's song "Here" on the b-side, and was released as a single in 1998 by record label Will, peaking at number 88 in the UK Singles Chart on October 31, 1998.

== Legacy ==
"A.M. 180" was featured prominently in the 2002 British film 28 Days Later. It is used as the opening theme music for the BBC Four television series, Charlie Brooker's Screenwipe. The song was used in a 2009 Dodge Journey advertisement. Belgian Indie rock band Girls In Hawaii regularly cover the song live, citing Grandaddy's 2003 set at Pukkelpop as paramount to their development as a band. Canadian pop punk band PUP released a cover version of the song in August 2020.

== Track listing ==
7" version

No.	Title	Length
1.	"A.M. 180"
2.	"Here" (Recorded Live at the Shepherd's Bush Empire)

CD version

No.	Title	Length
1.	"A.M. 180"
2.	"For the Dishwasher"
3.	"Glassy Dusty"

7" version
