= Oh for the Getting and Not Letting Go =

Studio album by All Smiles
- Released: June 30, 2009
- Genre: Rock
- Length: 44:02

All Smiles chronology
Ten Readings of a Warning (2007)	Oh for the Getting and Not Letting Go (2009)

Oh for the Getting and Not Letting Go is the self-released second album by All Smiles. It was released on June 30, 2009.

== Track listing ==
All songs written by Jim Fairchild.

1. "Maps to the Homes of Former Foes" – 3:48
2. "I Was Never the One" – 3:57
3. "Foxes in the Furnace" – 5:03
4. "The Brightest Beyond" – 6:09
5. "The Ones I Want to Live" – 4:40
6. "Our Final Roles As Birds" – 3:33
7. "Words of Wisdom" – 4:30
8. "All You Are is a Human Sir" – 4:44
9. "Brother I Know My Way" – 4:05
10. "It Never Saves Me" – 3:33

== Credits ==
- Produced by Solon Bixler and Jim Fairchild.
- Recorded and mixed by Mike Cresswell.
