= Jim Fairchild =

American guitarist and singer-songwriter

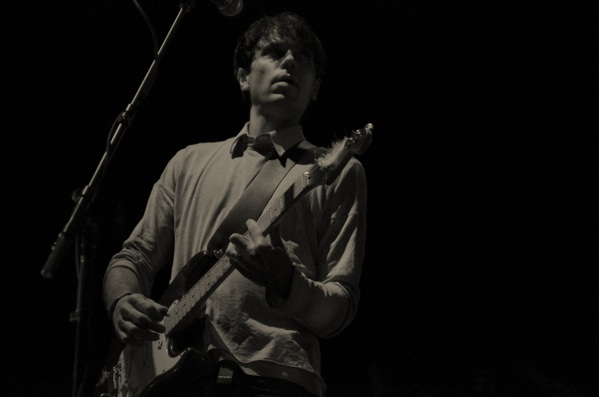
- Fairchild performing live

Background information
- Born: Kirby James Fairchild; Fresno, California
- Genre: Indie rock
- Occupations: Singer; songwriter; musician
- Instruments: Vocals; guitar
- Years active: 1992–present
- Labels: V2; Dangerbird Records

Kirby James Fairchild is an American guitarist and singer-songwriter. He is best known as a guitarist of the indie rock bands Grandaddy and Modest Mouse (2005, 2009-2021). Fairchild has released solo material under the pseudonym All Smiles.

== Biography ==
Born in Fresno, California, Fairchild moved to Modesto at the age of two, and began to play guitar at the age of 14. He has lived in Los Angeles, Chicago, Portland, Oregon, San Francisco, and New York City. Since 2014 he has lived in Los Angeles.

Fairchild joined Grandaddy as guitarist in 1995, and remained with the band until they broke up in 2006. He is featured on the Giant Sand release, Cover Magazine. In 2001, he was the touring guitarist with Giant Sand, who were the opening act for PJ Harvey.

In 2005, Fairchild began touring as a guitarist in Modest Mouse before Johnny Marr joined the band. He released his first solo album, Ten Readings of a Warning, which he arranged to be carbon neutral, in 2007, as well as a single, "Moth in a Cloud of Smoke". Musicians on the album include Solon Bixler, Joe Plummer, Danny Seim, and Janet Weiss. The album art was created by Natasha Wheat.

Fairchild rejoined Modest Mouse in February 2009, and has continued to tour with them both nationally and internationally. Fairchild released his second album, Oh for the Getting and Not Letting Go, on June 30, 2009. Band members on the album were Solon Bixler, Mike Cresswell, Nik Freitas, and Joe Plummer. After recording in Austin, Chicago, Los Angeles, Modesto, and Portland, All Smiles released the EP Fall Never Fell on November 17, 2009. The EP was recorded with musicians Bixler, Cresswell, Freitas, Plummer, Chico Jones, Dave Osborne, Danny Seim, Rachel Stolte and Alance Ward. He resumed his position in Modest Mouse in 2009. He participated in the writing and recording of their 2015 album, Strangers to Ourselves.

In 2010, Fairchild was selected to lead a project at the San Francisco Museum of Modern Art, and was credited on Admiral Radley's first album, I Heart California.

On March 1, 2011, Fairchild released All Smiles third full-length album, Staylow and Mighty, on his own Small Aisles label. This album included contributions from Joe Plummer, Danny Seim, and Gary Jarman.

Between Modest Mouse tours, he and Koley O'Brien began periodically writing and recording for a new project in 2017. Following O'Brien's death in a car accident in April 2019, Fairchild released the four songs they had completed on his Between A and B imprint.

In March 2020, Fairchild launched a new project, Grace Meridian, in collaboration with Plummer, Cresswell, and Temme Scott, also on the Between A and B imprint. He became Director of A&R for Dangerbird Records in March 2020. He announced his departure from Modest Mouse in June 2021 via Instagram.

== Personal life ==
Fairchild's wife is artist Natasha Wheat.

== Discography ==
Albums released as All Smiles:

- Ten Readings of a Warning (Dangerbird Records, 2007)
- Oh for the Getting and Not Letting Go (Small Aisles, 2009)
- Fall Never Fell (EP) (Small Aisles, 2009)
- Staylow and Mighty (Small Aisles, 2011)
- Mostly Cloudy, Morning Night (2012)

With Grandaddy:

- Under the Western Freeway (V2 Records, 1997)
- The Broken Down Comforter Collection (V2 Records, 1999)
- The Sophtware Slump (V2 Records, 2000)
- Sumday (V2 Records, 2003)
- The Ham and Its Lily (2003)
  - The Ham and Its Lily was a humorous release by Grandaddy under the band name "Arm of Roger"

With Modest Mouse:

- Strangers to Ourselves (Epic, 2015)
- The Golden Casket (Epic, 2021)

Other releases:

- Howe Gelb, "Can't Help Falling in Love with You" (1998)
- Giant Sand, Cover Magazine (on selected tracks, 2002)
- The Band of Blacky Ranchette, "Low Spark of High Heeled Boys" (2003)
- Goldcard, "The Rabbit Song" (2003)
- Earlimart, Treble and Tremble (Palm Pictures, 2004)
- Peter Walker, Young Gravity (Producer) (Dangerbird Records, 2006)
- Dappled Cities, Granddance (Dangerbird Records, 2007)
- Admiral Radley, "I Heart California" (The Ship, 2010)
- A, B, and The Sea, "Constant Vacation" (Producer on Selected Tracks) (2012)
- Donna Missal, "Stop the World" (Writer) (2016)
- Hawai, "Alive and Who Am I" (Writer) (Antler, 2017)
- Cale and The Gravity Well, "Creation Myths" (Producer and Writer) (Made in the Shade, 2017)
- Lontalius, "That Includes You" (Writer) (Partisan, 2018)
- Lontalius, "Nothing Makes Me Feel Stronger" (Writer) (PBWH, 2019)
- Modest Mouse, "Poison the Well" (Epic, 2019)
- Koley, "All Day I Dream About" (Producer and Writer) (Between A and B, 2019)
- Ethan Gruska, "Enough for Now" (Writer) (Warner, 2020)
- Grace Meridian, "Clover to Clover" (Between A and B, 2020)
