= A Smile =

Studio album by Dappled Cities Fly
- Released: 18 October 2004; 11 November 2006 (re-release)
- Recorded: 2003–2004
- Genre: Indie rock
- Length: 37:10
- Label: Smash Music/Speak 'n Spell
- Producer: Jonathon Burnside

Dappled Cities Fly chronology
A Smile (2004)	Granddance (2006)

A Smile is the first album by Dappled Cities Fly, released in 2004.

== Track listing ==
1. "Peach" – 3:34
2. "Blame It on the Boys" – 3:12
3. "League of German Girls" – 3:13
4. "Corpus Kinaethesia" – 2:36
5. "Make You Happy" – 2:15
6. "As I Lay Dying" – 4:48
7. "My Head's Queen Ant" – 3:39
8. "Cream" – 2:56
9. "Die in Your Eyes" – 3:57
10. "Faces" – 3:13
11. "States" – 3:41
