= It's a Cool Cool Christmas =

It's a Cool, Cool Christmas

Compilation album by Various Artists
- Released: November 21, 2000
- Genre: Alternative rock, Christmas music
- Length: 72:11
- Label: Jeepster Records
- Producer: Various

It's a Cool, Cool Christmas is a Christmas charity compilation album released in 2000 by Xfm on Jeepster Records in aid of The Big Issue. The album includes a mixture of traditional Christmas songs and original songs with a Christmas theme.

The album was reissued on vinyl by Jeepster Records in November 2021 in aid of War Child in the UK, with the blessing of all the original artists.

== Reception ==
Professional ratings
Review scores
Source	Rating
Allmusic	4/5 stars
BBC	(favorable)
RTÉ	3/5 stars

Allmusic writer Tim DiGravina described the album as "inspired good fun", calling it "without a doubt, one of the better alternative, holiday collections."

According to DiGravina, Grandaddy's "Alan Parsons in a Winter Wonderland," with its lyric about building a snowman and pretending that it is Alan Parsons, "might be the funniest song from 2000". The BBC's Richard Banks called "Alan Parsons" "a stroke of comedy genius". Scott Miller, in his book Music: What Happened?, suggested that Grandaddy "probably deserve immortality" just for this song. Ireland's public broadcasting network, RTÉ, called the Grandaddy song "downright silly", while Exclaim! called it "one of our favourite indie rock Christmas tunes ever".

Six By Seven's "I Believe in Father Christmas" was described by DiGravina as "some sort of post-modern classic".

"O Come, O Come Emmanuel", contributed by Belle and Sebastian, was described by RTÉ as a "beautiful ethereal version".

== Track listing ==
No.	Title	Writer(s)	Performer	Length
1.	"Alan Parsons In A Winter Wonderland"	Dick Smith, Felix Bernard	Grandaddy	2:59
2.	"Little Drummer Boy"	Harry Simeone, Henry Onorati, Katherine Davis	The Dandy Warhols	3:12
3.	"Every Day is Christmas"	Kevin Junior	The Webb Brothers	2:55
4.	"Everything's Gonna Be Cool This Christmas"	E	Eels	2:48
5.	"Feliz Navi-nada"	Jim Walker, John Lydon, John Wardle, Jose Feliciano, Keith Levine	El Vez	2:32
6.	"Christmas In Waikiki"	Morgan Nicholls	Morgan	4:41
7.	"Maybe At Christmas Time"	Isabel Monteiro	Drugstore	3:14
8.	"O Come, O Come Emmanuel"	Traditional (Arranged By Belle and Sebastian)	Belle and Sebastian	3:27
9.	"Thank You Dreaded Black Ice, Thank You"	Howe Gelb	Giant Sand	3:30
10.	"White Christmas"	Irving Berlin	The Flaming Lips	3:43
11.	"My Christmas Prayer"	Billy Fury	Saint Etienne	3:25
12.	"Christmas Downer"	Anderson, Kyle, Jamieson, Keegan	Departure Lounge	3:14
13.	"I Believe In Father Christmas"	Serge Prokofiev, Greg Lake, Peter Sinfield	Six By Seven	4:35
14.	"When I Get Home For Christmas"	Snow Patrol	Snow Patrol	4:17
15.	"Spiritual Guidance"	DJ Akira Honda, Emilio Acevedo, Jay De La Cueva, Julian Lede	Titán	3:56
16.	"Christmas Boogaloo"	Nasser Bouzida	Big Boss Man	4:20
17.	"Christmas Eve"	Euros Childs	Teenage Fanclub	2:01
18.	"Gift X-change"	Joey Burns	Calexico	3:08
19.	"Hwiangerdd Mair"	Haydn Morris, Nantlais Williams	Gorky's Zygotic Mynci	3:06
20.	"Just Like Christmas"	Sparhawk, Parker, Sally	Low	3:06
21.	"In The Bleak Midwinter"	Christina Rossetti, Gustav Holst	Lauren Laverne	4:02

Notes

- Track 2 previously released in the US on the compilation It's Finally Christmas
- Track 4 appears as a B side on the single "Cancer for the Cure"
- Track 5 from the album NoELVEZsi
- Track 6 "Christmas in Hawaii" from the album Tino's Breaks Volume 3 - Christmas.
- Track 11 appears as a B side on the single "I Was Born on Christmas Day"
- Track 19 appears as a B side on the single "Let's Get Together (In Our Minds)"
- Track 20 previously released on the EP Christmas

== See also ==
- Charity album
