= The Broken Down Comforter Collection =

Compilation album by Grandaddy
- Released: 1999
- Genre: Indie rock
- Label: Big Cat

Grandaddy chronology
Signal to Snow Ratio (1999)	The Broken Down Comforter Collection (1999)	The Sophtware Slump (2000)

The Broken Down Comforter Collection is a compilation album by American indie rock band Grandaddy, released in June 1999 by record label Big Cat. It is a combination of the tracks from the mini-album A Pretty Mess by This One Band and the EP Machines Are Not She.

== Reception ==
Professional ratings
Review scores
Source	Rating
AllMusic	3/5 stars
NME	8/10

The NME gave it a grade of 8 out of 10 and called it "patchy" but stated "there are gems hidden on here iridescent enough to render the collection essential". AllMusic writer Ben Davies gave it a three-star review, stating that the "low points come around rarely, and are far outnumbered by the quality tracks".

== Track listing ==
All tracks written by Jason Lytle.

1. "Gentle Spike Resort"
2. "Wretched Songs"
3. "Levitz"
4. "Away Birdies with Special Sounds"
5. "Kim You Bore Me to Death"
6. "For the Dishwasher"
7. "Pre Merced"
8. "Sikh in a Baja VW Bug"
9. "Lava Kiss"
10. "Fentry"
11. "Taster"
12. "Egg Hit and Jack Too"
13. "You Drove Your Car into a Moving Train" (hidden track)
