= Dappled Cities =

Australian indie rock band

- Origin: Sydney, New South Wales, Australia
- Genres: Indie rock, art rock, indie pop, dream pop
- Years active: 1997–present
- Members: Dave Rennick; Tim Derricourt; Ned Cooke; Allan Kumpulainen; Mark Harding
- Past members: Hugh Boyce; Mark Bradshaw; Alex Moore
- Website: www.dappledcities.com

Dappled Cities (formerly "Dappled Cities Fly") are an Australian indie rock band from Sydney.

== History ==
=== 1997–2003 ===
The band came together as teenagers in the northern suburbs of Sydney in 1997. Dave Rennick and original drummer Hugh Boyce were joined by Alex Moore on bass and Tim Derricourt on guitar. Keyboards were added occasionally by Mark Bradshaw, and after 2006 more regularly by Ned Cooke.

The band started out playing at all-ages shows and charity benefits before they reached legal age to play in the licensed venues in the Sydney CBD. They performed at the Hopetoun Hotel (now defunct), the Excelsior and The Bat and Ball. The band members moved to the inner suburbs of Sydney and after various name changes settled on Dappled Cities Fly.

The band made several tours of Australia and also toured New Zealand in 2004. In 2006 Dappled Cities Fly performed in London, England and at shows in the United States, including South by Southwest, where they played again in 2009 and 2010. From 2006 to 2009, the band did a number of tours of America and Canada, including performances at the Crocodile Club in Seattle, Mercury Lounge in New York and the Troubadour in Los Angeles.

=== 2004–present: Recording career ===
Dappled Cities Fly's first album, A Smile, was released in late 2004 and was featured as album of the week on radio stations FBi and Triple J. and reviewed favourably in The Sydney Morning Herald.

In 2006, Dappled Cities released their second album, Granddance, recorded at Sunset Sounds and Senora Studios in Los Angeles. The album's cover artwork has the band's name as Dappled Cities, without the word "Fly"; while this was done for artistic reasons at the time, by 2009 the band were calling themselves simply Dappled Cities. In 2007 the band toured with Sydney band Red Riders, and later recorded and released a cover version of "November Rain" with them. In February 2008 Boyce left the band, and was replaced later that year by drummer Allan Kumpulainen.

Dappled Cities' third album, Zounds, was released in Australia in 2009 and in the United States in early 2010. The album received many positive reviews. Pitchfork gave the band 7.8 and noted that "Dappled Cities haven't quite acquired a big reputation outside their homeland yet, but it seems likely they will". The band toured during this period in New York and London while also doing a number of tours around Australia to positive reviews.

The band recorded their fourth album, Lake Air, throughout September 2011 at Megaphon Studios in St Peters, following recording sessions in San Francisco and Los Angeles. The recording was done with the assistance of Jarrad Kritzstein and the album released in July 2012.

In 2013, the band collaborated with the Australian Brandenburg Orchestra and members of the Australian Chamber Orchestra for "The Future is Baroque", a Sydney Festival exclusive event pairing Dappled Cities' music with Baroque instrumentation. The band played as the supporting act at Death Cab for Cutie's "Codes and Keys" tour at the Palace Theatre in Melbourne, Australia.

The band returned from hibernation to play a sold-out show at Sydney's Newtown Social Club on 5 February 2016. The show featured a number of new songs from the band's upcoming fifth album, ||||| (pronounced "five"). In May that year they released a new single, "That Sound". In early 2017 the second single, "Stone Men", was released along with an accompanying music video. ||||| itself was released on 5 May 2017, the date intentionally mirroring the album title. The title was chosen to reflect the fact that the band had made five albums, had five members and had not put out an album in five years. ||||| was properly launched with a show at the City Recital Hall in Sydney. At the show, it was announced that bassist Alex Moore would be leaving the band. He was later replaced by Mark Harding.

Following another five-year hiatus, the band released a three-track EP entitled "Be Here" in late 2022, followed by a live performance in Sydney, Australia in January 2023.

Dappled Cities released their sixth studio album, The Aquarium, in 2026.

== Members ==
Current members

- Dave Rennick – guitar, lead vocals (1997–present)
- Tim Derricourt – guitar, lead vocals (1997–present)
- Ned Cooke – keyboards, sampler, backing vocals (2006–present)
- Allan Kumpulainen – drums (2008–present)
- Mark Harding – bass, backing vocals (2017–present), keyboards (2017, touring)

Past members

- Hugh Boyce – drums (1997–2008)
- Alex Moore – bass (1997–2017)
- Mark Bradshaw – keyboards (2004–2006)

== Discography ==
=== Studio albums ===
List of studio albums, with Australia chart positions
| Title | Album details | Peak chart positions |
| Title | Album details | AUS |
|---|---|---|
| A Smile | Released: October 2004; Label: Smash Music (Smash018); Format: CD | — |
| Granddance | Released: November 2006; Label: Speak N Spell (SNSCD0019); Format: CD, digital download | — |
| Zounds | Released: August 2009; Label: Speak N Spell (SNSCD0044); Format: CD, digital download, 2×LP | 48 |
| Lake Air | Released: August 2012; Label: Hub Recordings (HUB002LP); Format: CD, digital download, 2×LP, DVD | 41 |
| ||||| | Released: 5 May 2017; Label: Chugg Music (CHGV016); Format: CD, digital download, streaming | — |

=== Compilation albums ===
List of compilation albums, with Australia chart positions
| Title | Album details | Peak chart positions |
| Title | Album details | AUS |
|---|---|---|
| Many Roads | Released: January 2014; Label: Hub Recordings (HUB010CD); Format: CD, digital download; Note: B-sides & Rarities (2003–2013) | — |

=== Extended plays ===
List of EPs, with Australia chart positions
| Title | Album details | Peak chart positions |
| Title | Album details | AUS |
|---|---|---|
| Chameleon Girl | Released: March 2003; Label: Wash Records (WASHCD 005); Format: CD | — |
| Dead Bodies Where Their Mouths Were | Released: 2003; Label: Format: CD | — |
| May 2005 Split (with Tucker B's) | Released: 2005; Label: Dappled Cities Fly; Format: CD | — |
| A Crooked Smile | Released: 2006; Label: Revolution Records (REV002); Format: CD | — |

== Awards ==
=== AIR Awards ===
The Australian Independent Record Awards (commonly known informally as AIR Awards) is an annual awards night to recognise, promote and celebrate the success of Australia's Independent Music sector.

| Year | Nominee / work | Award | Result |
|---|---|---|---|
| 2009 | Zounds | Best Independent Album | Nominated |
| 2009 | themselves | Independent Artist of the Year | Nominated |

=== ARIA Music Awards ===
The ARIA Music Awards are annual awards, which recognises excellence, innovation, and achievement across all genres of Australian music. They commenced in 1987.

| Year | Nominee / work | Award | Result | Ref. |
|---|---|---|---|---|
| 2009 | Zounds | Best Independent Release | Nominated | |
| 2012 | Lake Air | Best Independent Release | Nominated | |
