= The Crystal Lake =

2000 single by Grandaddy

Single by Grandaddy

from the album The Sophtware Slump
- B-side: "Our Dying Brains"
- Released: 29 May 2000
- Genre: Indie rock
- Length: 5:00 (album version) 3:52 (radio edit)
- Label: V2
- Songwriter: Jason Lytle
- Producer: Jason Lytle

Grandaddy singles chronology
"A.M. 180" (1998)	"The Crystal Lake" (2000)	"Hewlett's Daughter" (2000)

"The Crystal Lake" is a song by American indie rock band Grandaddy from their second album, The Sophtware Slump. It was released as a single on 29 May 2000 by record label V2, and was re-released in several formats in early 2001.

== Content ==
Grandaddy frontman Jason Lytle described the song as "that age-old story, repeated many times in country music, of the wayward soul who leaves a small town with hopes and dreams of the unknown and winds up full of regret in some horrible little apartment in an unfriendly city".

== Release and reception ==
"The Crystal Lake" was released as a single on 29 May 2000. It was originally at number 78 on the UK Singles Chart when first released and peaked at number 38 when re-issued in 2001.

The song was listed as the 295th best song of the 2000s by Pitchfork.

== Track listings ==
2000 release

CD

No.	Title	Length
1.	"The Crystal Lake"
2.	"Our Dying Brains"
3.	"First Movement/Message Send: ID#5646766"

7"

No.	Title	Length
1.	"The Crystal Lake"
2.	"Our Dying Brains"

2001 releases

CD1

No.	Title	Length
1.	"The Crystal Lake"
2.	"Moe Bandy Mountaineers"
3.	"She-Deleter"

CD2

No.	Title	Length
1.	"The Crystal Lake"
2.	"What Can't Be Erased"
3.	"I Don't Want to Record Anymore"

7"

No.	Title	Length
1.	"The Crystal Lake"
2.	"Rode My Bike to My Sister's Wedding"

== Charts ==
Chart (2001)	Peak position
UK Singles (Official Charts)	38
