= Signal to Snow Ratio =

EP by Grandaddy
- Released: 1999
- Genre: Indie rock
- Label: V2

Grandaddy chronology
Under the Western Freeway (1997)	Signal to Snow Ratio (1999)	The Broken Down Comforter Collection (1999)

Signal to Snow Ratio is an EP by American indie rock band Grandaddy. It was released in 1999 by record label V2.

== Musical style ==
Describing the EP's musical style, AllMusic's Nitsuh Abebe writes "the band takes a large step away from its more straightforward pop and rock constructions, choosing instead to toy with the vintage electronics which added texture to [Under the Western Freeway], and to work with more roundabout and inventive pop structures which come off perfectly. Far from the typical Pavement and Weezer references which hovered around the LP, the best aesthetic reference for Signal to Snow Ratio would be more along the lines of Mercury Rev – the sounds might be completely different, but the intelligent and imaginative approach to rethinking pop music is very much the same."

== Release ==
Signal to Snow Ratio was released in 1999 and is also included in the special edition of the album The Sophtware Slump.

== Reception ==
Professional ratings
Review scores
Source	Rating
AllMusic	3/5 stars
Robert Christgau	(2-star Honorable Mention)
Pitchfork	6.0/10

Brent DiCrescenzo of Pitchfork described it as "A brief burst of infectious ideas, while sometimes specious, the EP packs as many subtle effects and pleasurable references that seem possible before bursting the po-mo bubble in its 13 minutes." Nitsuh Abebe of AllMusic described it as "a beautiful progression from Under the Western Freeway, Grandaddy's last full-length release" and "a very promising note from an ever-more-promising band."

== Track listing ==
All music written by Jason Lytle.

1. "Hand Crank Transmitter"
2. "Jeddy 3's Poem"
3. "MGM Grand"
4. "Protected from the Rain"
