= Under the Western Freeway =

Studio album by Grandaddy
- Released: October 21, 1997
- Recorded: Floater, Modesto & Headcorders, Coulterville, California
- Genres: Indie rock; psychedelic rock; space pop
- Length: 46:47
- Label: Will
- Producer: Jason Lytle

Grandaddy chronology
A Pretty Mess by This One Band (1996)	Under the Western Freeway (1997)	Signal to Snow Ratio (1999)

Singles from Under the Western Freeway
- 1. "Everything Beautiful Is Far Away" Released: February 1998; 2. "Laughing Stock" Released: March 1998; 3. "Summer Here Kids" Released: May 1998; 4. "A.M. 180" Released: October 1998

Under the Western Freeway is the debut studio album by American indie rock band Grandaddy. It was released on October 21, 1997, by record label Will.

The album, while not commercially successful, was well received by music critics. Multiple songs have been used by Charlie Brooker in different mediums, such as for the themes of Charlie Brooker's Screenwipe and So Wrong It's Right.

== Release ==
Under the Western Freeway was released on October 21, 1997. It was later reissued in the U.S. by V2 Records. It was also reissued in 2017 by Friendship Fever for its 20th anniversary.

=== Reception ===
Professional ratings
Review scores
Source	Rating
AllMusic	4/5 stars
The Guardian	3/5 stars
NME	8/10
Pitchfork	9.6/10 (1997); 8.1/10 (2017)
Q	4/5 stars
The Rolling Stone Album Guide	3.5/5 stars
Uncut	9/10
The Village Voice	A−

The album was well received by music critics.

CMJ New Music Monthly described it as "an eccentric psych-pop collection". Andy Gill of The Independent called it "one of the most beguiling debuts of the year [...] a fortuitous collision of Brian Wilson, Neil Young and the Pixies which throws out a stream of understated pop gems". AllMusic noted similarities to the bands Pavement and Weezer, and described it as "a fairly brilliant album, combining a warm, earnest and rustic feel with sometimes goofy experimentation". Frontman Jason Lytle's vocal performance was also praised; Jason Josephes of Pitchfork wrote: "If the lonely vocals of 'Lineage' and 'Collective Dreamwish of Upperclass Elegance' don't strike you there, you have no soul". Steve Taylor wrote in his book The A to X of Alternative Music that "Laughing Stock" is the album's standout track.

== Track listing ==
All tracks are written by Jason Lytle.

No.	Title	Length
1.	"Nonphenomenal Lineage"	3:11
2.	"A.M. 180"	3:20
3.	"Collective Dreamwish of Upperclass Elegance"	5:26
4.	"Summer Here Kids"	3:35
5.	"Laughing Stock"	6:00
6.	"Under the Western Freeway"	3:01
7.	"Everything Beautiful Is Far Away"	5:13
8.	"Poisoned at Hartsy Thai Food"	1:13
9.	"Go Progress Chrome"	2:31
10.	"Why Took Your Advice"	4:07
11.	"Lawn & So On" (The song "Lawn & So On" ends at 2:20. After 1 minute and 45 seconds of silence, at minute 4:05 begins an untitled hidden track: it's the singing of crickets.)	9:05

Japanese version bonus tracks
No.	Title	Length
1.	"Levitz (Birdless)"	4:22
2.	"My Small Love"	1:21
3.	"G.P.C."	1:43
4.	"12-Pak-599"	3:56
