= PIAPTK =

American record label

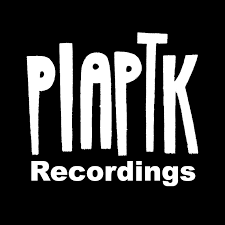
- Founded: 2006
- Founder: Michael Dixon
- Distributor: The Business
- Country of origin: U.S.
- Location: Olympia, Washington
- Official website: www.piaptk.limitedrun.com

PIAPTK Recordings is an American independent record label founded in Olympia, Washington in 2006 by Michael Dixon and based in Tucson, Arizona.

== History ==
Michael Dixon started People in a Position to Know (PIAPTK) Recordings in 2006 while teaching high school in Olympia. Inspired by New Zealand's lathe pioneer Peter King, Dixon acquired a disc cutting lathe and began cutting and releasing hand-made DIY records. In 2013, Dixon put his teaching career on hold and moved to Tucson to make records full time, through his five vinyl companies: PIAPTK, Soiled Gold, Lathecuts.com, Mobile Vinyl Recorders, and The Science of Sound.
