= Sumday =

Studio album by Grandaddy
- Released: May 13, 2003
- Genres: Indie pop; indie rock
- Length: 52:27
- Label: V2
- Producer: Jason Lytle

Grandaddy chronology
The Sophtware Slump (2000)	Sumday (2003)	Below the Radio (2004)

Singles from Sumday
- 1. "El Caminos in the West" Released: August 25, 2003; 2. "Now It's On" Released: 2003; 3. "I'm on Standby/Stray Dog and the Chocolate Shake" Released: January 12, 2004

Sumday is the third studio album by American indie rock band Grandaddy, released on May 13, 2003, by V2 Records. The album was released 3 years after their critically acclaimed second album, The Sophtware Slump.

The album achieved commercial success in the UK, and was well received by music critics.

== Content ==
Around about the time of the album's release, frontman Jason Lytle commented that the album "represents the closest I've been to singing in the first person, writing passionately".

== Release ==
Sumday was released on May 13, 2003, by record label V2.

The album is the group's highest charting in the UK, peaking at No. 22. By 2006, the album had sold 110,000 copies.

An expanded version of the album was released five months later, with a bonus disc of songs recorded live at the Glastonbury Festival in 2003 (tracks 1–6) as well as three tracks taken from The Black Sessions in Paris (tracks 7–9).

A 20th anniversary box set titled Sumday Twunny was released in August 2023.

=== Singles ===
Three singles were released from the album: "El Caminos in the West", which reached No. 48 on the UK Singles Chart; "Now It's On", which reached No. 23; and "I'm on Standby".

== Critical reception ==
Professional ratings
Aggregate scores
Source	Rating
Metacritic	78/100
Review scores
Source	Rating
AllMusic	3/5 stars
Blender	4/5 stars
Entertainment Weekly	A−
The Guardian	4/5 stars
Los Angeles Times	3/4 stars
NME	8/10
Pitchfork	8.1/10 (2003); 8.4/10 (2023)
Rolling Stone	3/5 stars
Spin	A
Uncut	4/5 stars

The album was well received by music critics.

PopMatters viewed the album as one where Lytle had decided to "tone down on the experimentation, and concentrate on developing some terrific melodies", calling it "really the next logical step for the band". He commented on similarities to the Alan Parsons Project ("Now It's On"), ELO ("The Go in the Go-for-It") and John Lennon ("Lost on Yer Merry Way"), and noted an improvement in Lytle's songwriting. The CMJ New Music Report made it their 'essential release' in May 2003, calling it a "genuinely wholehearted work", and in their end-of-year review placed it at No. 7 in their list of the top albums of the year. Jim DeRogatis, in his book Turn on Your Mind: Four Decades of Great Psychedelic Rock, viewed the melodies as "even more effervescent and more memorable" than on The Sophtware Slump. Sophie Best of The Age called it "another sprawling sonic Grandaddy adventure, shimmering with wistful sincerity and rural-tinged psychedelia". NME gave it a grade of 8/10, writing that the songs sound "pretty much like Neil Young if he'd heard an Aphex Twin record". Robert Christgau of The Village Voice gave the album a one-star honorable mention rating and cited "The Group Who Couldn't Say" and "Stray Dog and the Chocolate Shake" as highlights.

A less favorable review came from Heather Phares of AllMusic, who described the record as being "bland and complacent", opining that it failed to live up to the expectations of The Sophtware Slump. A 2023 review of the 20th anniversary reissue from Arielle Gordon of Pitchfork described it as "wide-open" and "a prescient meditation on the need to escape" that "stood apart from its predecessors".

== Track listing ==
All tracks are written by Jason Lytle.

Sumday track listing
No.	Title	Length
1.	"Now It's On"	4:08
2.	"I'm on Standby"	3:13
3.	"The Go in the Go-for-It"	3:40
4.	"The Group Who Couldn't Say"	4:08
5.	"Lost on Yer Merry Way"	6:17
6.	"El Caminos in the West"	3:22
7.	"'Yeah' Is What We Had"	3:45
8.	"Saddest Vacant Lot in All the World"	3:52
9.	"Stray Dog and the Chocolate Shake"	3:43
10.	"O.K. with My Decay"	6:11
11.	"The Warming Sun"	5:44
12.	"The Final Push to the Sum"	4:24

Expanded version bonus disc
No.	Title	Length
1.	"The Crystal Lake"
2.	"For the Dishwasher"
3.	"Yeah Is What We Had"
4.	"AM 180"
5.	"Our Dying Brains"
6.	"Laughing Stock"
7.	"The Go in the Go for It"
8.	"Saddest Vacant Lot in All the World"
9.	"He's Simple, He's Dumb, He's the Pilot"

== Personnel ==
Grandaddy

- Jason Lytle – lead vocals, guitar, various instruments, production, engineering
- Kevin Garcia – bass guitar
- Aaron Burtch – drums
- Jim Fairchild – guitar
- Tim Dryden – keyboards

Technical

- Lucky Lew – engineering
- Michael H. Brauer – mixing
- Nathaniel Chan – mixing assistance
- Rick Chavarria – mixing assistance
- Greg Calbi – mastering
- Shinzou Maeda – cover photography

== Charts ==
Chart performance for Sumday
Chart (2003)	Peak position
Belgian Albums (Ultratop Flanders)	13
Belgian Albums (Ultratop Wallonia)	30
French Albums (SNEP)	44
Irish Albums (IRMA)	30
Scottish Albums (Official Charts)	19
Swedish Albums (Sverigetopplistan)	51
UK Albums (Official Charts)	22
US Billboard 200	84
