= The Sophtware Slump =

Studio album by Grandaddy
- Released: May 29, 2000
- Recorded: 1999–2000
- Studios: Little Portugal, Modesto, California
- Genres: Indie rock; space rock
- Length: 46:47
- Label: V2
- Producer: Jason Lytle

Grandaddy chronology
Signal to Snow Ratio (1999)	The Sophtware Slump (2000)	Sumday (2003)

Singles from The Sophtware Slump
- 1. "The Crystal Lake" Released: May 29, 2000; 2. "Hewlett's Daughter" Released: August 7, 2000; 3. "He's Simple, He's Dumb, He's the Pilot." Released: November 13, 2000; 4. "The Crystal Lake" Released: January 29, 2001 (reissue)

The Sophtware Slump is the second studio album by American indie rock band Grandaddy. It was released in May 2000 by record label V2. It is seen by some as a concept album about problems concerning modern technology in society. The album was released to critical acclaim.

== Writing and recording ==
The album was written and recorded by frontman Jason Lytle alone in a remote farmhouse. He has been quoted as saying: "I just remember everything out there was dusty. Humidity and dust", and described having made the recordings "in my boxer shorts, bent over keyboards with sweat dripping off my forehead, frustrated, hungover and trying to call my coke dealer".

=== Content ===
The album's title The Sophtware Slump is a reference to a sophomore slump, a term given to an artist's second album which is seen to fail to live up to the first, as well as a double entendre on software.

"Jed the Humanoid" concerns an android named Jed, and is a eulogy for the robot, who drinks himself to death. Regarding Jed, who also appears in "Jed's Other Poem (Beautiful Ground)" and had appeared earlier in the song "Jeddy 3's Poem" from the 1999 EP Signal to Snow Ratio, Lytle noted: "I used Jed as my therapy vehicle, I guess... I was attempting to approach the subject of drinking, and possibly the fact that you may perhaps drink a little bit too much. [...] Humour has always been way up there at the top of my list of dealing with anything that could be considered serious. Sometimes you don't wanna be smacked in the face with certain bits of reality like that." A music reviewer for The Guardian, Dorian Lynskey, called it "the saddest robot song ever written."

The album's penultimate song, "Miner at the Dial-a-View", originates from a 1989 home demo, with Lytle noting: "After a certain point, when the Earth has been tapped of all its resources, they start mining other planets. And there's these machines – they're a lot like, y'know, the tabletop poker games that you find in bars now – and the idea is to add coins to it, and you can punch in the latitude and longitude of places on earth, and revisit wherever you want. And [the narrator]'s actually revisiting his house, and he's seeing the girl that he's got back home is hanging out with some other guy, and he misses home."

=== 20th anniversary re-recording ===
On August 28, 2020 it was announced that Grandaddy would release a new recording of The Sophtware Slump to mark its 20th anniversary, the whole album being performed solo by Jason Lytle with a piano and no other instruments. The album, titled The Sophtware Slump ..... on a wooden piano, was initially recorded during 2020 by Jason Lytle and was released by Dangerbird Records on November 20.

== Release ==
The Sophtware Slump was released on May 29, 2000. It reached No. 36 on the UK Albums Chart in its first week of release, re-entering the chart in 2001, peaking at number 63. By February 2001 the album had sold 20,000 copies in the US and almost 80,000 worldwide. By 2006 it had sold 107,000 copies. Three singles were released from the album: "The Crystal Lake", released the same day, which charted at number 38 on the UK Singles Chart; "He's Simple, He's Dumb, He's the Pilot."; and "Hewlett's Daughter", which charted at number 71 on the UK Singles Chart.

The album was reissued in 2011 with a second disc of bonus material containing B-sides, EP tracks, outtakes and demos.

== Reception ==
Professional ratings
Aggregate scores
Source	Rating
Metacritic	81/100
Review scores
Source	Rating
AllMusic	4.5/5 stars
Entertainment Weekly	A−
Los Angeles Times	4/4 stars
Melody Maker	3/5 stars
NME	9/10
Pitchfork	8.5/10
Q	4/5 stars
Rolling Stone	3.5/5 stars
The Rolling Stone Album Guide	4/5 stars
The Village Voice	A−

The Sophtware Slump was released to widespread critical acclaim.

The CMJ New Music Monthly noted Jason Lytle's "new infatuation with technology, expertly juxtaposed with his almost spiritual connection to the West's wide-open spaces and bird-filled skies", and stated that "Lytle expresses sympathy for the lost souls and machines of the high-tech dot-com landscape throughout the album". The New York Times called the album "a heart-achingly beautiful requiem for a culture in which progress and technology have led to alienation and disposability". AllMusic called it "Grandaddy's most impressive work yet". The Daily Telegraph said the album was one of the highlights of 2000, describing it as "a work of rare and precious qualities. A collection of emotional, richly melodic songs that deal with modern man's uneasy relationship with technology". Steve Taylor, in his book The A to X of Alternative Music, viewed The Sophtware Slump as "clean, lush and less understated" than the band's previous work, describing "The Crystal Lake" as "a perfectly executed pop song".

== Legacy ==
The indie music magazine Under the Radar ranked The Sophtware Slump fifteenth in its list of the best albums of the 2000s.

Regarding the album's acclaim and legacy, Jason Lytle noted: "I would record The Sophtware Slump over again. The fact that this album has gotten this sort of acclaim only reconfirms to me what a load of shit this business is. An album about trees and computers that came out right after OK Computer? I don't get it... but I do." In a 2011 review of the album's deluxe edition, Mike Powell of Pitchfork wrote: "If Radiohead captured a feeling of pre-millenial tension, The Sophtware Slump captured the feeling of disappointment that came afterward — the feeling that life was going to be more or less the same as it had been, only now we'd have to live with the fact that we once thought it'd be so different: the feeling of January 2, 2000."

== Track listing ==
All tracks are written by Jason Lytle.

No.	Title	Length
1.	"He's Simple, He's Dumb, He's the Pilot."	8:52
2.	"Hewlett's Daughter"	3:06
3.	"Jed the Humanoid"	4:18
4.	"The Crystal Lake"	5:00
5.	"Chartsengrafs"	2:51
6.	"Underneath the Weeping Willow"	2:40
7.	"Broken Household Appliance National Forest"	4:34
8.	"Jed's Other Poem (Beautiful Ground)"	3:25
9.	"E. Knievel Interlude (The Perils of Keeping It Real)"	1:57
10.	"Miner at the Dial-a-View"	5:21
11.	"So You'll Aim Toward the Sky"	4:43
Total length:		46:47

Bonus tracks on Japanese edition
No.	Title	Length
12.	"Our Dying Brains"	4:43
13.	"First Movement / Message Sent"	9:56
Total length:		61:26

Bonus disc with 2011 Deluxe Edition
No.	Title	Length
1.	"Discarded Pilot Intro"	1:53
2.	"Our Dying Brains"	4:43
3.	"L.F.O."	3:33
4.	"Wives of Farmers"	3:40
5.	"Chartsengrafs (Original Demo)"	1:50
6.	"N. Blender"	4:05
7.	"Wonder Why in L.A."	4:32
8.	"Air Conditioners in the Woods"	0:07
9.	"Moe Bandy Mountaineers"	2:20
10.	"First Movement / Message Send"	8:08
11.	"XD-Data-II"	5:02
12.	"Beautiful Ground (Original Cassette Tape Demo)"	3:30
13.	"Street Bunny"	2:04
14.	"She-Deleter"	5:58
15.	"What Can't Be Erased (Drinking Beer in the Bank of America with Two Chicks from Tempe Arizona"	4:28
16.	"I Don't Want to Record Anymore"	1:51
17.	"Aisle Seat 37-D"	4:07
18.	"Hewlett's Daughter (Original Cassette Tape Demo)"	4:33
19.	"Rode My Bike to My Stepsister's Wedding"	4:43
Total length:		71:07

== Personnel ==
Grandaddy

- Jason Lytle – vocals, all instruments, producer, mixing
- Jim Fairchild – "on/off switch assistance", performer
- Aaron Burtch – performer
- Kevin Garcia – performer
- Tim Dryden – performer

Additional personnel

- Greg Calbi – mastering
- Tim Dryden's wife – female operator voice (10) [uncredited]
