= Grandaddy =

American rock band

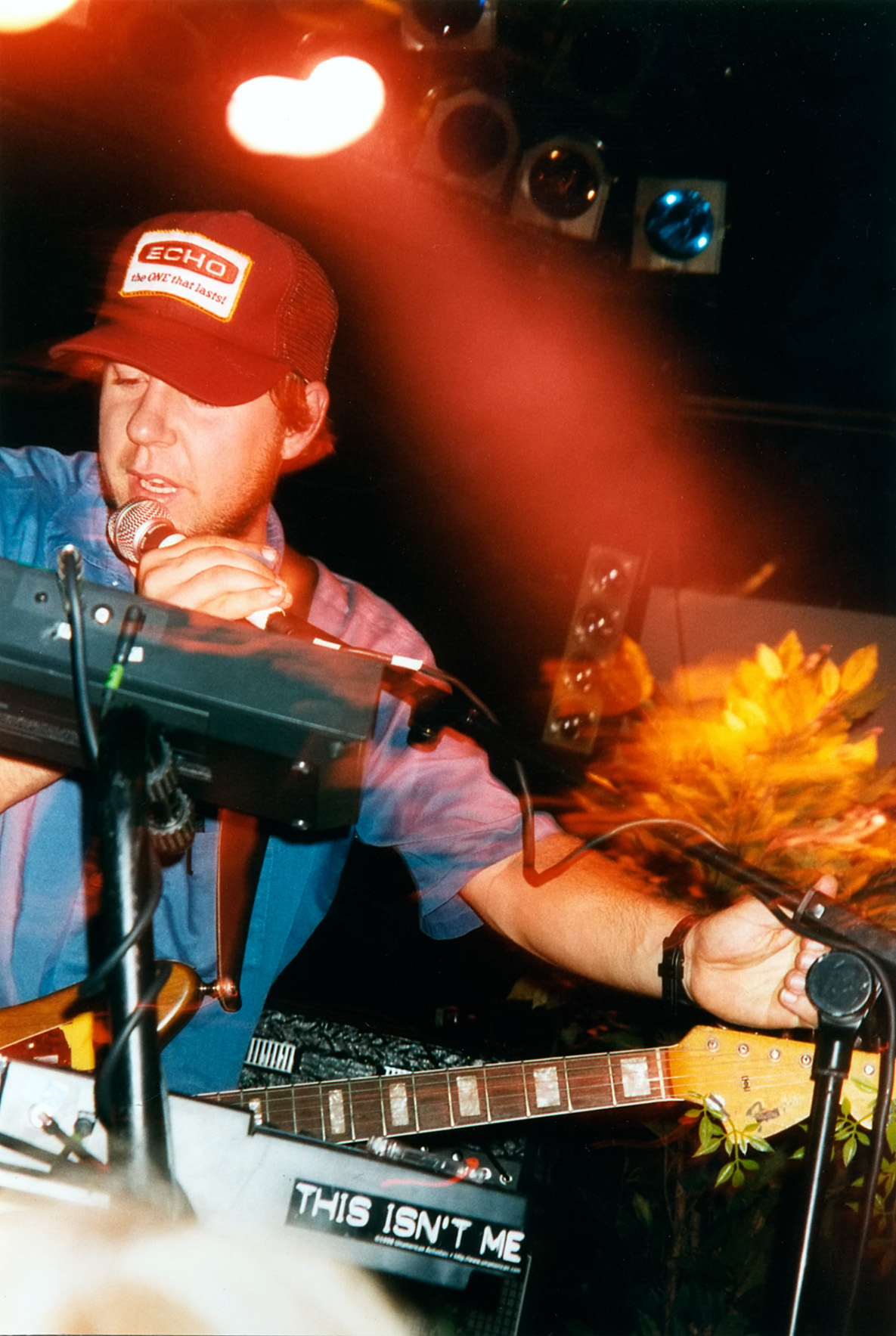
- Jason Lytle performing live with Grandaddy in London in 1998

Background information
- Origin: Modesto, California, U.S.
- Genres: Indie rock; space rock; psychedelic rock; lo-fi
- Years active: 1992–2006, 2012–2017, 2023–present
- Labels: Big Jesus; Will; Big Cat; V2; Good; Dangerbird
- Members: Jason Lytle; Jim Fairchild; Tim Dryden; Aaron Burtch
- Past members: Kevin Garcia

Grandaddy is an American indie rock band from Modesto, California. The group was formed in 1992, and featured Jason Lytle, Aaron Burtch, Jim Fairchild, Kevin Garcia and Tim Dryden, until Garcia's death in 2017 following a stroke.

After several self-released records and cassettes, the band signed to Will Records in the US and later the V2 Records subsidiary Big Cat Records in the UK, going on to sign an exclusive deal with V2. The bulk of the band's recorded output was the work of Lytle, who worked primarily in home studios.

Grandaddy released four studio albums before splitting in 2006, with band members going on to solo careers and other projects. Grandaddy reformed in 2012, and after several successful tours, released its fifth studio album, Last Place, in March 2017. Following Garcia's sudden death, the band cancelled its touring plans for the release and re-entered an extended hiatus.

In 2024, Lytle revived the Grandaddy name to release the project's sixth studio album, Blu Wav, ahead of a full 2025 reunion tour in celebration of the 25th anniversary of The Sophtware Slump.

== History ==
=== 1992–1997: Formation and early independent releases ===
Grandaddy was formed in 1992 by singer, guitarist and keyboardist Jason Lytle, bassist Kevin Garcia and drummer Aaron Burtch. A former professional skateboarder, Lytle had turned to music after a knee injury forced him to stop skating. He began working at a sewage treatment plant to fund the purchase of music equipment. Several of the band's early live performances were at skateboarding competitions.

The band members constructed a studio at the Lytle family home, and their first release, also in 1992, was the self-produced cassette Prepare to Bawl. This was followed in April 1994 by a second cassette titled Complex Party Come Along Theories. The singles "Could This Be Love" and "Taster" were released later that year. The guitarist Jim Fairchild and the keyboardist Tim Dryden joined the band in 1995. Fairchild, who left another band to join Grandaddy, was another former professional skateboarder and had already guested with them; Dryden had been Fairchild's "jam-buddy". A third cassette, Don't Sock the Tryer, was withdrawn, and the band instead released their debut mini-album A Pretty Mess by This One Band in April 1996 on the Seattle-based Will label.

In 1997 they released their debut full-length album Under the Western Freeway through Will, and, with the help of Howe Gelb, signed a UK deal with Big Cat Records – by then a subsidiary of Richard Branson's V2 Records – who reissued the album the following year. The album included the single "A.M. 180", which was featured during a sequence in the 2002 British film 28 Days Later. It was also used for the theme song for the BBC Four television series Charlie Brooker's Screenwipe (9 years later, Screenwipe debuted in 2006), and in an advertisement for Colin Murray's BBC Radio 1 show. "A.M. 180" was also used in television commercials for the Dodge Journey automobile. One of the album's singles, "Summer Here Kids", was rated as "Single of the Week" by popular British music magazine NME, and was also used as the theme music for another Charlie Brooker-fronted show, BBC Radio 4's So Wrong It's Right. The album led to an increase in the band's popularity in Europe, and a main stage performance at the Reading Festival in 1998. The album was only a success in the US when later reissued by V2. With the band busy touring in 1999, their next release was the compilation The Broken Down Comforter Collection.

=== 1998–2005: V2 record deal and mainstream success ===
Unhappy with the efforts of Will Records, the band signed a worldwide deal with V2 Records in 1999, their first release on the label being the Signal to Snow Ratio EP in September that year. In May 2000 they released their second album, The Sophtware Slump, to critical acclaim. NME later placed it at number 34 in their "Top 100 Greatest Albums of the Decade", and The Independent described it as "easily the equal of OK Computer". The album reached number 36 on the UK Albums Chart, and the band's fanbase increased, including celebrities such as David Bowie, Kate Moss and Liv Tyler. By early 2001 the album had sold 80,000 copies worldwide. The first single from the album, "The Crystal Lake", became the band's first UK top 40 single when it was reissued in 2001.

Around the time that The Sophtware Slump was released, Grandaddy was invited to open for Elliott Smith on his tour for Figure 8. On some nights, Smith would join Grandaddy onstage and sing lead vocals on portions of "He's Simple, He's Dumb, He's the Pilot". The band later opened for Coldplay on their US tour in mid-2001. Also in 2001, the band's version of The Beatles' "Revolution" was used in the film I Am Sam.

On December 20, 2002, Grandaddy released The Ham and Its Lily under the alias Arm of Roger via their private label Sweat of the Alps. The songs were recorded prior to the release of the Signal to Snow Ratio EP, and were initially created as a prank on their record label: the band initially submitted The Ham and Its Lily to V2 executives as a practical joke. The album was sold at their concerts during 2003, and in 2015 reissued on vinyl and cassette by PIAPTK/Soiled Gold Records.

Their third album, Sumday, recorded in Lytle's home studio, was released in 2003. The band promoted it with a pre-release US tour with Pete Yorn followed by a three-week European tour (including a performance at the Glastonbury Festival) and a larger US tour. Lytle described the album as "Grandaddy influenced by Grandaddy ... the ultimate Grandaddy record".

In 2004 and 2005 Lytle recorded Just Like the Fambly Cat, which was released as a Grandaddy album, although by then the band had decided to split up. The title is a reference to Lytle's desire to leave Modesto, a town which he complained "sucks out people's souls". Lytle created the album over a year and a half in his home studio in Modesto, "fueled by alcohol, painkillers for his body aches and ... recreational drugs", with only Burtch from the remainder of the band playing on it. At the same time as working on the album, Lytle created the EP Excerpts From the Diary of Todd Zilla, which was released first.

=== 2006–2011: Breakup and post-Grandaddy activities ===
In January 2006, after a meeting the previous month, Lytle announced that the band had decided to split up, citing the lack of financial income from being in the group. Just Like the Fambly Cat was released later that year as a farewell album. Lytle spoke to the NME:

It was inevitable ... On one hand our stubbornness has paid off, but on the other hand refusing to buy into the way things are traditionally supposed to be done has made things worse for us ... The realistic part is it hasn't proved to be a huge money-making venture for a lot of guys in the band.

Lytle had called the meeting in a hotel in Modesto, and it was the first time the band had been in a room together for two years. The feeling at the meeting was described by Lytle as frustration, the result of a breakdown in communication among the band members. According to Lytle the decision was not a surprise:

Everybody knew, but we needed to make it formal, we needed to make it official. We needed to pay some respects to what we've done, just make it real.

Lytle also stated that he was "burnt out on touring" and cited his fears over his drug and alcohol problems as a factor in the band's split, and in 2009 he expressed his preference for being solo, saying that he was "a bit of a loner", and, referring to his former bandmates, stated: "The main thing is not having four girlfriends to lug around with me all the time."

Lytle regarded Just Like the Fambly Cat as a "pretty fitting" last stop for Grandaddy; however, he continued to make music and perform solo, and worked with M. Ward on Hold Time. In 2009 Lytle moved from Modesto to Montana, and released his first solo album Yours Truly, the Commuter. In late 2009 Lytle and former Grandaddy drummer Aaron Burtch joined Aaron Espinoza and Ariana Murray of Earlimart to form the band Admiral Radley. Admiral Radley's debut album I Heart California was released on July 13, 2010 via Espinoza's label The Ship. In 2011 Burtch played in a band called The Good Luck Thrift Store Outfit. Lytle's second solo album, Dept. of Disappearance, was released in 2012.

Jim Fairchild's first solo album, Ten Readings of a Warning, was released in April 2007 on Dangerbird Records, under the name All Smiles. A second All Smiles album, Oh for the Getting and Not Letting Go, was released on June 30, 2009. In 2010, he was selected to lead a project at the San Francisco Museum of Modern Art, and in 2011 he released his third All Smiles album, Staylow and Mighty. Fairchild has also played for the bands Giant Sand, Great Northern, Lackthereof and Modest Mouse, having first played guitar with the latter in 2005.

=== 2012–2013: Reunion ===
In March 2012, it was announced that Grandaddy had reformed and were to play a limited number of shows, including London on September 4, and headlining the End of the Road Festival in the UK. Grandaddy also played San Francisco's Outside Lands Music and Arts Festival and Paris's Rock en Seine Festival in August 2012. On August 7, 2012, to kick off their reunion tour, they played a "secret" show at the Partisan venue in Merced, California, but were billed as "The Arm of Roger". The next day they played as Grandaddy at the Henry Miller Library, Big Sur.

Regarding the band's reunion, Lytle noted, "The bargain I made myself regarding the 'brief reunion and couple of shows' situation was that I wasn't gonna talk too much about it. I was just gonna stew on it, and then do it. That's the good thing about festivals. No need for me to sell anything here. Get in, rock out, get paid, get out. There are just going to be a few shows. Festival-type thingies. Perhaps the odd 'warm up gig' in someone's hair salon or something. Money was a motivating factor (resurfacing my indoor tennis court, oil change for my 4×4 Ferrari) but the idea of playing and hanging out with each other is something all of the guys are pretty stoked about."

Lytle later noted, "It was actually Jim [Fairchild]'s fault. He suggested that we consider playing some shows, and I went, 'No', [but] he convinced me it might be a good idea. We talked about it for a little while. I didn't think anyone else in the band would be into it, [and] he checked around and it turns out they were all enthusiastic. I think I was the last one to say yes. ... I was actually blown away that they even wanted to. Once I found that out, I said 'OK, let's start doing the work, figure out how to play the songs.' The weird moment was when he had the first rehearsal; I had no idea how it was going to turn out. After five days of playing together it actually sounded really good. It was too easy, and we were actually really having a good time together."

Lytle also noted that he was likely to record a new Grandaddy album, stating, "It's probably going to happen. ... If anyone knows anything about Grandaddy, they realise that my [solo] music and Grandaddy's music is slightly interchangeable. I think if I were to focus on making a Grandaddy record [it would be] a full-blown Grandaddy record, and I like the idea of that. I'd like to give it a shot." In early 2013, Lytle elaborated: "I love the idea of making another Grandaddy record, but I wouldn't want it hanging over my head like 'Okay, you made this record, now are you guys going to get out there and tour in support of it?' ... I'm hoping for this dream scenario where I can make Grandaddy records every so often and not have all this messy stuff that goes along with it. I already did that and it's just not appealing to me any more."

=== 2014–2017: Last Place and the death of Kevin Garcia ===
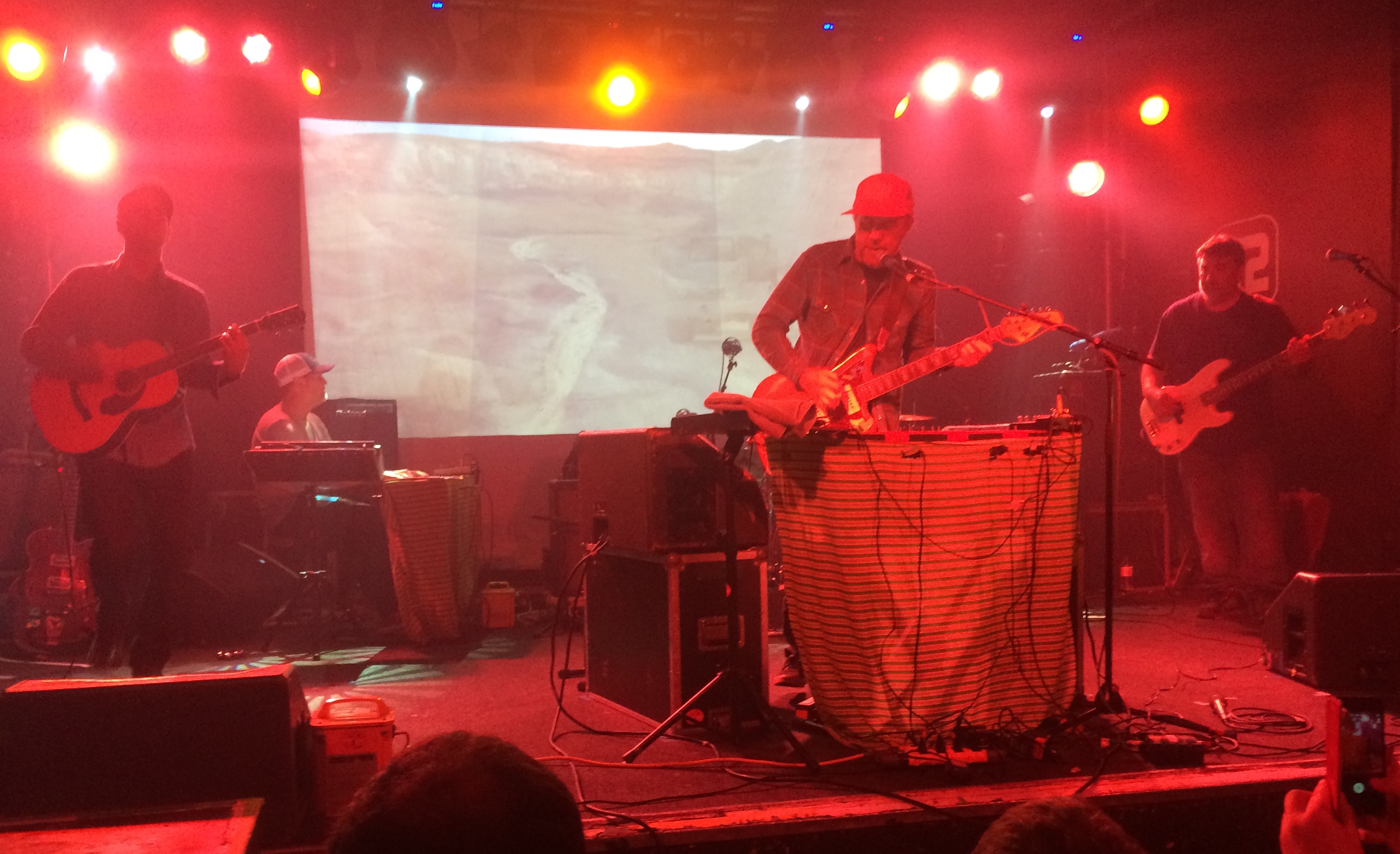
Grandaddy live at Concorde 2 in Brighton, England, April 1, 2017: Kevin Garcia is at right

From 2014 to 2015 Lytle produced the album Why Are You OK by Band of Horses, to which he contributed material; this collaboration also produced the single "Hang an Ornament", which was issued as the work of Grandaddy and Band of Horses. In September 2015 Lytle tweeted that the band was working on a "new GD LP", which was interpreted by the media as confirmation that a new Grandaddy album was being recorded. Following a second reunion tour in the summer of 2016, the band announced that a new album called Last Place would be released by Danger Mouse's 30th Century Records on March 3, 2017, and released a video featuring the actor Jason Ritter for the single "Way We Won't". In March 2017, Lytle said that he could "at least promise one more" Grandaddy album after Last Place, since it was the first of two that the band was contracted to create.

Kevin Garcia (born Kevin Michael Garcia on June 22, 1975 in San Jose, California) died on May 2, 2017, aged 41, one day after suffering a "massive stroke". He became a member of Grandaddy at the age of 15. Following his death, the band canceled all its planned live appearances. Two commemorative shows were planned in Modesto for October 2017 – the first was a scheduled date that had already sold out – but these were also canceled due to the band members' ongoing grief over Garcia's passing.

Minor activity during the rest of 2017 included the releases of a music video featuring the comedian Jonah Ray for the single "Brush with the Wild", taken from Last Place, and an EP of live and alternative versions of songs from Last Place titled Things Anyway. To commemorate its 20th anniversary in October 2017, the album Under the Western Freeway was reissued as a double vinyl LP that included eight demo tracks. In November 2018 a song titled "Bison on the Plains" was released: Lytle revealed that it had been written prior to the completion of Last Place .

=== 2018–2023: Hiatus, archival releases and renewed activity ===
On August 28, 2020 it was announced that Grandaddy would release their 2000 album The Sophtware Slump in a 20th anniversary edition but with a twist—the whole album being performed by Jason Lytle with piano and no other instruments. The album was initially recorded during lockdown by Jason Lytle and was released in November 2020.

In October 2020, Lytle confirmed that he had plans to record a sixth (and possibly final) Grandaddy album: "I'm working on a solo LP, then I'm gonna do another Grandaddy record. I'm gonna go big on the Grandaddy; I want it to be this all-encompassing, cool send-off. I have life plans that don't involve playing live. I want to spend more time outdoors, off the grid." Lytle elaborated, suggesting that it might not be the project's final release: "I am just embarking on a new album of my own; it’s gonna be under my own name, but right after that I’m starting on a new, very big, comprehensive Grandaddy record; I’m not gonna call it the last [Grandaddy record], it’s gonna be the most comprehensive-sounding, and it’s gonna be tied in with a documentary."

In April 2022, Lytle and a group of French musicians embarked on a short tour of Europe under the name "Grandaddy and the Lost Machine Orchestra," playing the entirety of The Sophtware Slump.

On February 25, 2023, Lytle announced via Twitter in response to a fan that a new album had been recorded and would be released "in the middle of" that year.

On May 12, 2023, Sumday: The Cassette Demos released, featuring demo versions of the songs off their 2003 album, Sumday. Merch related to the aforementioned album also released on their storefront at the same time.

=== 2023–present: Blu Wav ===
On October 25, 2023, "Watercooler," the lead single from their sixth album Blu Wav, was released alongside a music video. Two months later, on December 1, 2023, "Cabin in My Mind," the second single/music video from the album, was released.

The album was released on February 16, 2024. Lytle is the only band member who contributed to the album, performing all vocals and instruments, apart from pedal steel guitar by Max Hart.

== Musical style and influences ==
Much of Grandaddy's music is characterized by Lytle's analog synthesizer and the fuzzy guitar, bass and drums of the rest of the band. The band has variously been described as "bittersweet indie space rock", "neo-psychedelic, blissed-out indie rock", "dreamy, spacey psychedelic pop", and "an uneasy combination of warm, tactile guitars and affectless electronics". Jon Pareles of The New York Times described the band's songs as "stately anthems orchestrated with full late-psychedelic pomp: fuzz-toned guitar strumming, rippling keyboards, brawny drumbeats".

While Grandaddy's style has sometimes been described as alt country, in Lytle's view it is the sentiment of country music that the band embraced rather than the musical style. In their early days, the band was influenced by US punk groups such as Suicidal Tendencies, Fear and Bad Brains. Their lo-fi sound was compared to that of Pavement. The band has also been compared to Radiohead (even described as "the next Radiohead" in 2001), Weezer, The Flaming Lips and Elliott Smith. With Sumday, the band was compared to the Electric Light Orchestra (ELO) and The Alan Parsons Project.

Lytle has cited both ELO and The Beatles as inspirations, stating in 2003: "I'm completely in tune with ELO and [frontman] Jeff Lynne – I know that guy like the back of my hand." He stated in 2009: "I think the majority of my musical influences were set in stone when I was five or six years old." Lytle has also cited new wave artists including Talk Talk, A Flock of Seagulls, Thompson Twins, OMD, the Human League, Thomas Dolby, Depeche Mode and A-ha. His vocals have drawn comparisons with Neil Young.

=== Lyrical themes ===
Common lyrical themes include technology and a resistance to change. Adrien Begrand, writing for PopMatters, described the lyrics on The Sophtware Slump as "one's attempt to transcend the glut of technology in today's urban lifestyle, in search of something more real, more natural, more pastoral". Ben Sisario of The New York Times stated that the band "provided the soundtrack to dot-com-era alienation, singing in a cracked yet still innocent voice of life spent staring into a computer screen". Ross Raihala, reviewing Sumday for Spin, identified what he called Lytle's "geeky identification with technology". On The Sophtware Slump, CMJ writer Richard A. Martin commented on Lytle's "sympathy for the lost souls and machines of the high-tech dot-com landscape". Lytle described his empathy with machines in 2003, stating "I find it easier dealing with certain things by living through inanimate objects" and how the song "I'm on Standby" is about Lytle relating to a mobile phone: "I was spending so much time learning the art of turning off, while still being 'on'".

Lytle said of the tracks on Excerpts from the Diary of Todd Zilla: "For some reason, they are tied together by the idea of being fed up with your environment." He stated in 2001: "I have a growing appreciation for that which is simple and natural. I get that from the outdoors, and seeing the accumulation of clutter and waste and not being too happy about it."

There is also much humor in Lytle's songwriting, including the band's promotional Christmas single released in 2000, "Alan Parsons in a Winter Wonderland", which was also included on the charity compilation It's a Cool Cool Christmas, described by AllMusic's Tim DiGravina as possibly "the funniest song from 2000".

== Recording techniques ==
The band's releases were generally recorded and mixed in makeshift studios based in homes, garages and warehouses, although the last two albums were mixed in a dedicated facility. Although live performances used a full band, much of the recordings were done by Lytle alone using analog recorders and Pro Tools. He recorded basic drum tracks in a soundproofed room and overdubbed cymbals and tom toms. He recorded his vocals close to the strings of a piano for what he described as a "ghostly effect".

Lytle described how the Grandaddy recordings became more of a solo effort, and the right conditions for recording:

Earlier on I tried to include people as much as possible. Then I realised the magic is me really prying stuff out of my head and getting it on to tape, and that stuff doesn't happen unless I'm completely alone. Sometimes it's about the right amount of blood sugar, just slightly hungover. And I'm really affected by the weather. If it's too nice outside it's insane for me, the concept of being inside. Everybody talks about this whole technology versus nature thing and if it's anything that is it: look who my best friends are, a bunch of plastic and circuitry and electricity, when I should be running around getting chased by bumblebees.

== Discography ==
Studio albums

- Under the Western Freeway (1997)
- The Sophtware Slump (2000)
- Sumday (2003)
- Just Like the Fambly Cat (2006)
- Last Place (2017)
- Blu Wav (2024)
