= Coady Willis =

American drummer

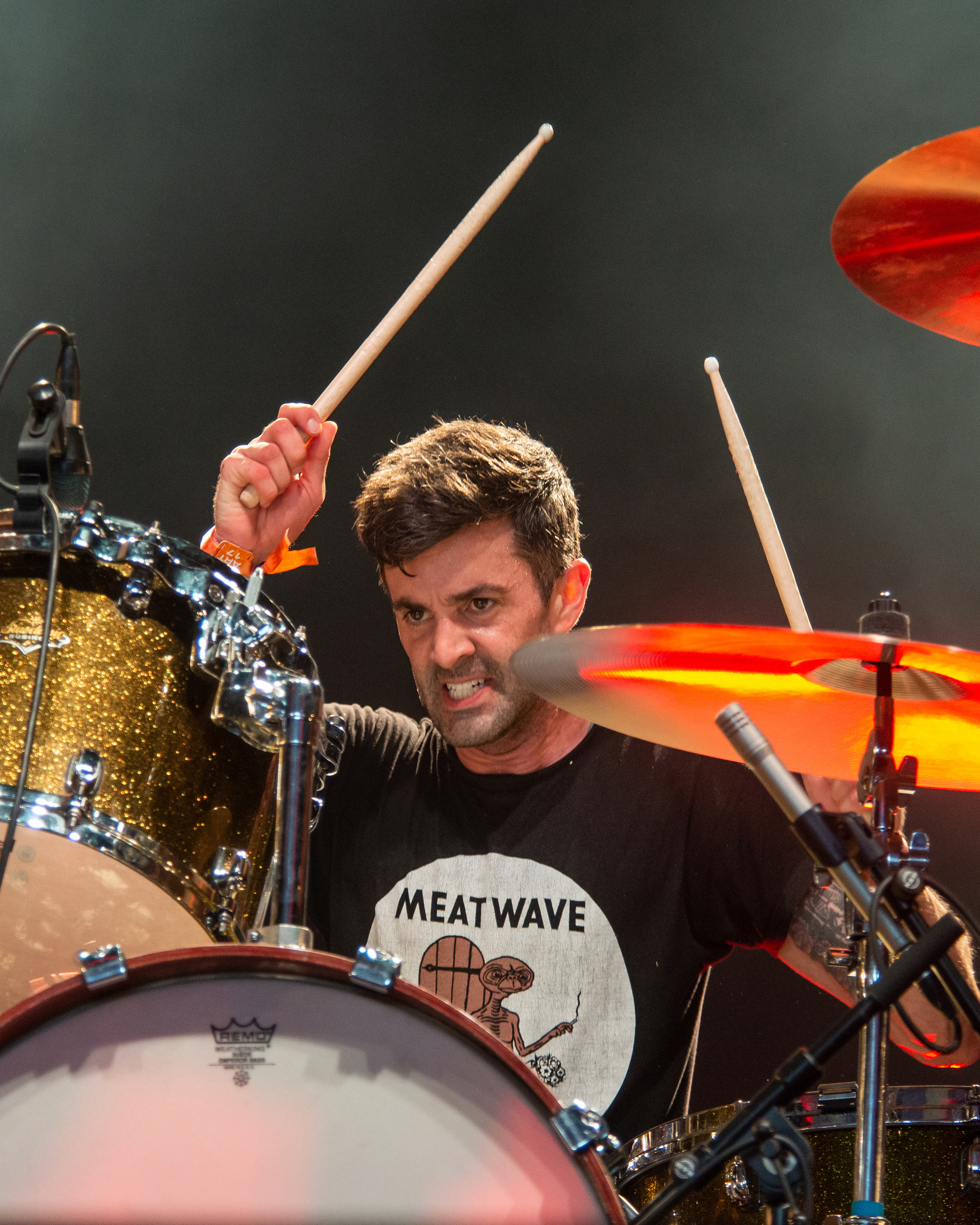
- Willis with High on Fire in 2022

Background information
- Occupation: Drummer
- Member of: The Murder City Devils; Big Business; White Shit; High on Fire; Melvins; Gatta Morta
- Formerly of: Dead Low Tide

Coady Willis is an American drummer and a member of the rock/metal bands Big Business, High on Fire, White Shit, Gatta Morta, and Melvins. He previously played in the bands Dead Low Tide, Broadcast Oblivion, and The Murder City Devils.

Willis and Big Business bandmate Jared Warren both appear on Melvins' albums (A) Senile Animal, Nude with Boots and The Bride Screamed Murder and have officially been members of the band since moving to Los Angeles in January 2006.

He also sometimes plays drums in the live incarnation of Dale Crover's side project Altamont (also his bandmate and fellow drummer in Melvins).

== Select discography ==
=== The Murder City Devils ===
- 1997: The Murder City Devils
- 1998: Empty Bottles, Broken Hearts
- 2000: In Name and Blood
- 2001: Thelema (EP)
- 2014: The White Ghost Has Blood on Its Hands Again

=== Dead Low Tide ===
- 2002: III Eagle
- 2003: Dead Low Tide

=== Broadcast Oblivion ===
- 2003: Transmita Olvido
- 2003: Her Arsenal / We Burn Away

=== Big Business ===
- 2005: Head for the Shallow
- 2007: Here Come the Waterworks
- 2009: Mind the Drift
- 2011: Quadruple Single (EP)
- 2013: Battlefields Forever
- 2016: Command Your Weather
- 2019: The Beast You Are

=== White Shit ===
- 2009: Sculpted Beef
- 2010: NCAACP EP
- 2010: Cary Me
- 2010: White Shi'ite

=== Melvins ===
- 2006: (A) Senile Animal
- 2008: Nude with Boots
- 2010: The Bride Screamed Murder
- 2011: Sugar Daddy Live (live album)
- 2012: The Bulls & the Bees (EP)
- 2013: Everybody Loves Sausages (select songs)
- 2016: Basses Loaded (on the song "Choco Plumbing")

=== Hew Time ===
- 2014: Hew Time
- 2016: Seconds

=== High on Fire ===
- 2024: Cometh the Storm

=== Nuclear Dudes ===
- 2025: Skeletal Blasphemy
