= A Gun Called Tension =

US musical group

- Origin: Washington, USA
- Genres: Dancehall, Hip hop, Ragga, Electronic
- Members: Dann Gallucci; Sean Reveron; Spencer Moody

A Gun Called Tension is a band with Dann Gallucci, from the bands Modest Mouse, The Murder City Devils, Triumph of Lethargy Skinned Alive to Death, and Sean Reveron of The Beta Band, Exodus 77, and The Free Association, and Spencer Moody, of the Murder City Devils

The band's sound is a mix of Dancehall, Hip-Hop, Ragga, and Electronic styles, although listeners seem to group them with Hip-Hop artists more. Their second album titled The Sub Sonic Sessions, is a combination of original and remixed work. Their first album featured guests like Roots Manuva, Airborne Audio, DJ's Andy Sells and Monesa Yamakawa, Coady Willis and Spencer Moody of Murder City Devils, Blood Brother Morgan Henderson, Pretty Girls Make Graves singer Andrea Zollo, and producer Phil Ek.

== Discography ==
- A Gun Called Tension (Cold Crush Records, 2005)
- Sub Sonic Sessions (Rockers NYC Records,2007)
- A Gun Called Tension (7") Split (Go Midnight Records,2006)

== See also ==
- Modest Mouse
- Murder City Devils
