= Sugar Daddy Live =

Live album by Melvins
- Released: May 31, 2011
- Recorded: Busta-Guts Club Downey, California
- Genre: Alternative rock
- Length: 61:36
- Language: English
- Label: Ipecac (CD); Amphetamine Reptile Records (Split Series)

Melvins chronology
The Bride Screamed Murder (2010)	Sugar Daddy Live (2011)	The Bulls & the Bees (2012)

Professional ratings
Aggregate scores
Source	Rating
Metacritic	77/100
Review scores
Source	Rating
Allmusic	3.5/5 stars
Popmatters	8/10
Revolver	4/5 stars

Sugar Daddy Live is a live album by the Melvins, released on May 31, 2011. The songs are taken from their 2008 tour, with the majority of the tracks coming from their two most recent studio albums at the time, (A) Senile Animal and Nude with Boots.

Two songs from the same show that were left off of the live album were released separately. "Suicide in Progress" was released in a split 7-inch with Totimoshi on Volcom Entertainment. "Billy Fish" was released as "Billy Fish Alive" as part of the Joyful Noise 2013 flexi series.

== Track listing ==
No.	Title	Length
1.	"Nude with Boots"	3:59
2.	"Dog Island"	5:55
3.	"Dies Iraea"	3:19
4.	"Civilized Worm"	5:39
5.	"The Kicking Machine"	2:32
6.	"Eye Flys"	9:12
7.	"Tipping the Lion"	3:44
8.	"Rat Faced Granny"	2:48
9.	"The Hawk"	2:24
10.	"You've Never Been Right"	2:46
11.	"A History of Bad Men"	5:39
12.	"Star Spangled Banner"	1:47
13.	"Boris"	11:44

== Split Series ==
All thirteen songs were released as 12-inch singles for a split series through Amphetamine Reptile Records with bands selected by the Melvins, taking nearly three years to finish. Though some of the bands submitted new material, others like The U-Men and the Cows contributed previously released material due to being defunct.

=== Vol. 1: U-Men ===
"Gila" was originally released on the U-Men's self-titled debut EP in 1984.

No.	Title	Length
1.	"Nude with Boots"	3:59
2.	"Gila"	2:18

=== Vol. 2: Cows ===
"Chow" is from the Cows' second album, Daddy Has a Tail, released on AmRep in 1989.

No.	Title	Length
1.	"Dog Island"	5:55
2.	"Chow"	3:43

=== Vol. 3: Off! ===
Off! provided a cover of "No Reason to Complain", originally by The Alarm Clocks.

No.	Title	Length
1.	"Civilized Worm"	5:39
2.	"No Reason to Complain"	1:15

=== Vol. 4: Killdozer ===
"Lupus" was released in 1989 on Killdozer's Twelve Point Buck album and as a single.

No.	Title	Length
1.	"Dies Iraea"	3:19
2.	"Lupus"	3:09

=== Vol. 5: Midwest Hardcore ===
A trio of classic hardcore bands from the midwest United States: Negative Approach with "Sick of Talk", Die Kreuzen with "In School" and Necros with "IQ32".

No.	Title	Length
1.	"The Kicking Machine"	2:32
2.	"Sick of Talk"	0:34
3.	"In School"	1:29
4.	"IQ32"	0:24

=== Vol. 6: Butthole Surfers ===
All Butthole Surfers tracks are taken from a live performance dated January 31, 1987. "No Rule" is a Leather Nun cover.

No.	Title	Length
1.	"Eye Flys"	9:12
2.	"Pittsburgh to Lebanon"	3:45
3.	"No Rule"	2:13
4.	"Gary Floyd"	2:02

=== Vol. 7: Mudhoney ===
All Mudhoney tracks are taken from a single live performance.

No.	Title	Length
1.	"Tipping The Lion"	3:44
2.	"If I Think"	3:58
3.	"I'm Now"	2:43
4.	"Judgement, Rage, Retribution and Thyme"	2:19
5.	"The Open Mind"	2:12
6.	"Tales of Terror"	3:26

=== Vol. 8: Fucked Up ===
"21st Century Cling-Ons" by Fucked Up was released exclusively on this single.

No.	Title	Length
1.	"Rat Faced Granny"	2:48
2.	"21st Century Cling-Ons"	4:45

=== Vol. 9: Napalm Death ===
"To Go Off and Things" is originally by the Cardiacs. "Oxygen of Duplicity" is a previously unreleased original.

No.	Title	Length
1.	"The Hawk"	2:24
2.	"To Go Off and Things"	2:31
3.	"Oxygen of Duplicity"	3:36

=== Vol. 10: Fantômas ===
The Fantômas tracks are taken from the original demo that Mike Patton made before the band was fully assembled. It was released in its entirety on a cassette included in the Wunderkammer box set.

No.	Title	Length
1.	"You've Never Been Right"	2:46
2.	"SKETCHBOOK 1: Page 20, 16, 26, 9, 15, 2, 19, 25 and 7"	9:51

=== Vol. 11: Melvins 1983 ===
"Dogs and Cattle Prods" was previously released on Tres Cabrones in 2013.

No.	Title	Length
1.	"The Star-Spangled Banner"	1:47
2.	"Dogs and Cattle Prods"	8:58

=== Vol. 12: King Buzzo ===
"The Vulgar Joke" was originally released on This Machine Kills Artists in 2014 and was the only song left out of the three volume 10-inch vinyl release of the album through AmRep.

No.	Title	Length
1.	"A History of Bad Men"	5:39
2.	"The Vulgar Joke"	2:37

=== Vol. 13: Karp ===
"Rowdy" came from Karp's last single, released in 1998, and was later included on Action Chemistry. "Bacon Industry" comes from the band's final album, Self Titled LP, originally released in 1997.

No.	Title	Length
1.	"Boris"	11:44
2.	"Rowdy"	5:14
3.	"Bacon Industry"	3:56

== Personnel ==
- King Buzzo - guitar, vocals
- Dale Crover - drums, vocals
- Coady Willis - drums, vocals
- Mr. Warren - bass, vocals

=== Additional personnel ===
- Toshi Kasai - engineer
- John Golden - mastering
- Mackie Osborne - package design, illustrations
- Ben Clark - live photos
- Jane Adams - live photos
