= Dead Low Tide =

American rock band

- Origin: Seattle
- Genre: Garage rock
- Years active: 2001–2003
- Label: Tiger Style Records
- Spinoff of: Murder City Devils
- Past members: Spencer Moody; Nate Manny; Mike Kunka; Coady Willis

Dead Low Tide was a short-lived rock band from Seattle, Washington. It featured singer Spencer Moody, guitarist Nate Manny, bassist Mike Kunka, and drummer Coady Willis.

== History ==
After the breakup of the Murder City Devils in 2001, ex-members Moody, Manny, and Willis began to work on a new project, along with ex-godheadSilo bassist Kunka. In 2002 they put out a self-released debut EP, and embarked on a U.S. tour with the Melvins. That same year they began recording their eponymously titled, full-length album, which was not released until after the band's breakup in 2003.

== Discography ==
Dead Low Tide

Studio album by Dead Low Tide
- Released: October 7, 2003
- Recorded: 2002–2003
- Genre: Rock
- Length: 41:00
- Label: Tiger Style Records

=== Albums ===
- Dead Low Tide (Tiger Style Records CD/LP, 2003)
  1. Barrel Vault
  2. White Flag
  3. Navy Buttons
  4. Blues Come Easy
  5. Ill Eagle
  6. Lazer Lazer Lazer Love
  7. Purple Crimson and Lavender
  8. Don't Mind If I Do
  9. Sideways Machine
  10. Shake and Slide

=== Singles and EPs ===
- "Lazer Lazer Lazer Love" (Ill Eagle 7", 2002)
- Dead Low Tide EP (Ill Eagle CD/EP, 2002)

=== Further reading ===
- Crawdaddy! article on Murder City Devils and Dead Low Tide, "Ride the Dead Low Tide," March 26, 2008
