= Mike Kunka =

American bass guitarist

- Birth name: Michael Andrew Kunka
- Genres: Noise rock, sludge metal
- Occupation: Musician
- Instrument(s): Bass guitar, vocals
- Years active: 1991–present

Mike Kunka is an American bass guitarist best known as a member of the drone metal group godheadSilo. He has also been a member of the groups Dead Low Tide and Enemymine, both based out of Washington state.

== Biography ==
Michael Andrew Kunka founded godheadSilo in 1991 with Phil Leitch on guitar and Dan Haugh on drums. Leitch departed from the band after their first show, leaving Kunka and Haugh to continue performing as a duo. After relocating to Olympia they recorded and released their debut The Scientific Supercake L.P. in 1994 for indie label Kill Rock Stars. After releasing two more albums, Skyward in Triumph in 1996 and Share the Fantasy in 1998, the band went on hiatus so its members could pursue other projects.

In 2016, a collaboration between Kunka and sludge metal band The Melvins was released as Three Men and a Baby. Recorded in 1999 shortly after godheadSilo went on hiatus, the album features Kunka, Buzz Osborne, and Kevin Rutmanis all performing on bass guitar.

== Discography ==
- Three Men and a Baby (with The Melvins, 2016)
