= Big Business (band) =

American heavy metal band

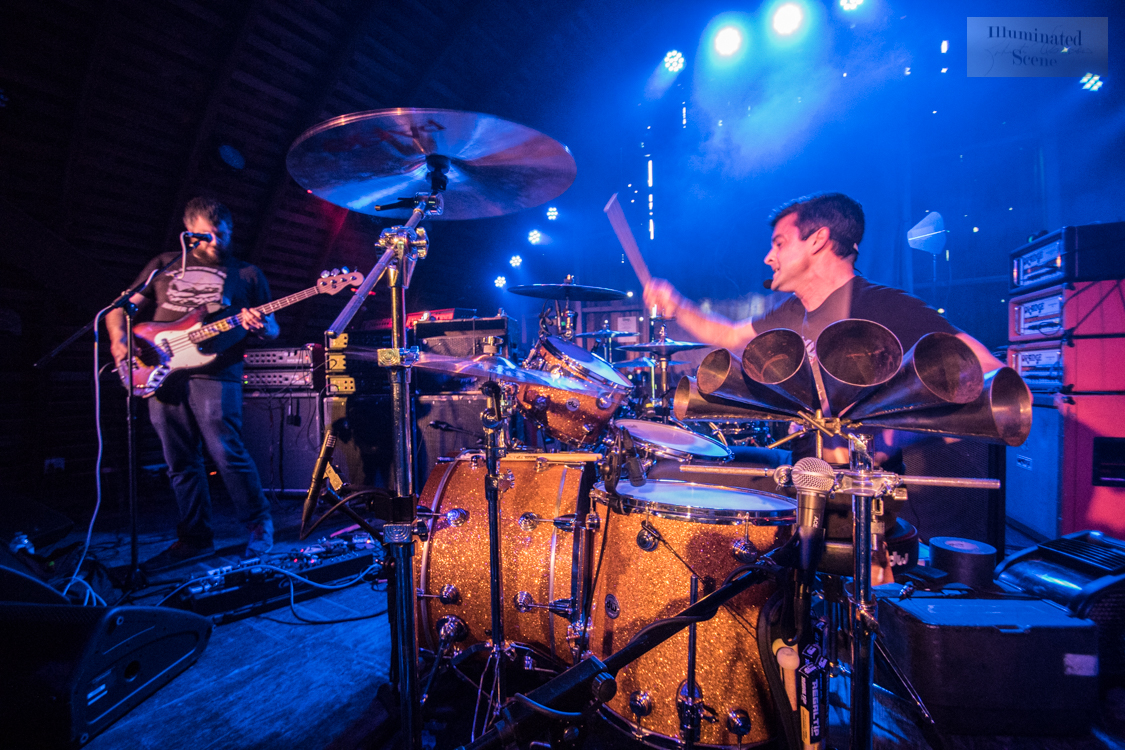
- Big Business performing in 2019

Background information
- Origin: Seattle, Washington, U.S.
- Genres: Stoner metal, sludge metal
- Years active: 2004–present
- Labels: Joyful Noise, Hydra Head
- Members: Jared Warren; Coady Willis
- Past members: Scott Martin; Toshi Kasai
- Website: bigbigbusiness.com

Big Business is an American stoner/sludge metal band founded in 2004 by bassist/vocalist Jared Warren (Karp) and drummer Coady Willis (The Murder City Devils). They formed in Seattle, Washington and have been based in Los Angeles, California since 2006. Their music is characterized by a bombastic and frantic style. For most of their existence, Big Business has been a bass-drums duo with other musicians occasionally contributing.

== History ==
The band released their first Tour EP and the vinyl version of their first album, Head for the Shallow, on January 25, 2005, through Wäntage USA. The CD version of Head for the Shallow was released by Hydra Head Records, the first of a three-album run.

In late 2006, after relocating to Los Angeles, Warren and Willis both became members of the Melvins, first appearing on (A) Senile Animal. The tour, titled "The Double-Drumming Rock for Peace Tour", featured Warren and Willis playing a set as Big Business before being joined by Dale Crover and Buzz Osborne for a set as the Melvins. While on tour, Big Business played with frequent Melvins collaborator David Scott Stone, who would later play guitar and Minimoog Voyager on all songs from their 2007 release Here Come the Waterworks.

After releasing Here Come the Waterworks to critical acclaim, Big Business was given an opening spot on the summer leg of the Tool tour. Toshi Kasai played guitar for Big Business throughout this tour. After the fall US tour ended, Big Business started recording material for the new Melvins album, entitled Nude with Boots, which was released in July 2008.

On March 9, 2008, guitarist/keyboardist Toshi Kasai was introduced onstage as the third member of Big Business. The band and Kasai later confirmed his membership on their respective Myspace pages. Big Business released their third album, Mind the Drift, on May 12, 2009. It was produced by Phil Ek, who had also produced both of their previous albums.

In October 2010, after a year of not playing any concerts, they posted on their Myspace that they had added another guitarist, Scott Martin (400 Blows, Crom), officially making them a "power quartet". They toured the summer of 2011 with Torche and Thrones. Big Business toured with Red Fang and American Sharks in the spring of 2014.

In 2016, their next album, Command Your Weather (2016), was released by Joyful Noise Recordings / Gold Metal Records. Around 2016, Warren and Willis were no longer part of Melvins. At this same time, Big Business began touring as a two-piece once again without any specific announcement or press regarding changes from the earlier trio and quartet lineups.

The band's latest release, The Beast You Are, was issued by Joyful Noise Recordings / Gold Metal Records. In April 2019, drummer Coady Willis appeared on the podcast Conan Neutron's Protonic Reversal to discuss the making of The Beast You Are and a general career retrospective for Big Business and his other musical projects. He also appeared on an episode of The Vinyl Guide around the same time. In 2020, Jared Warren also participated in a long form career spanning interview on Protonic Reversal, speaking about the Whip reissues, Big Business, his time with the Melvins and much more.

== Members ==
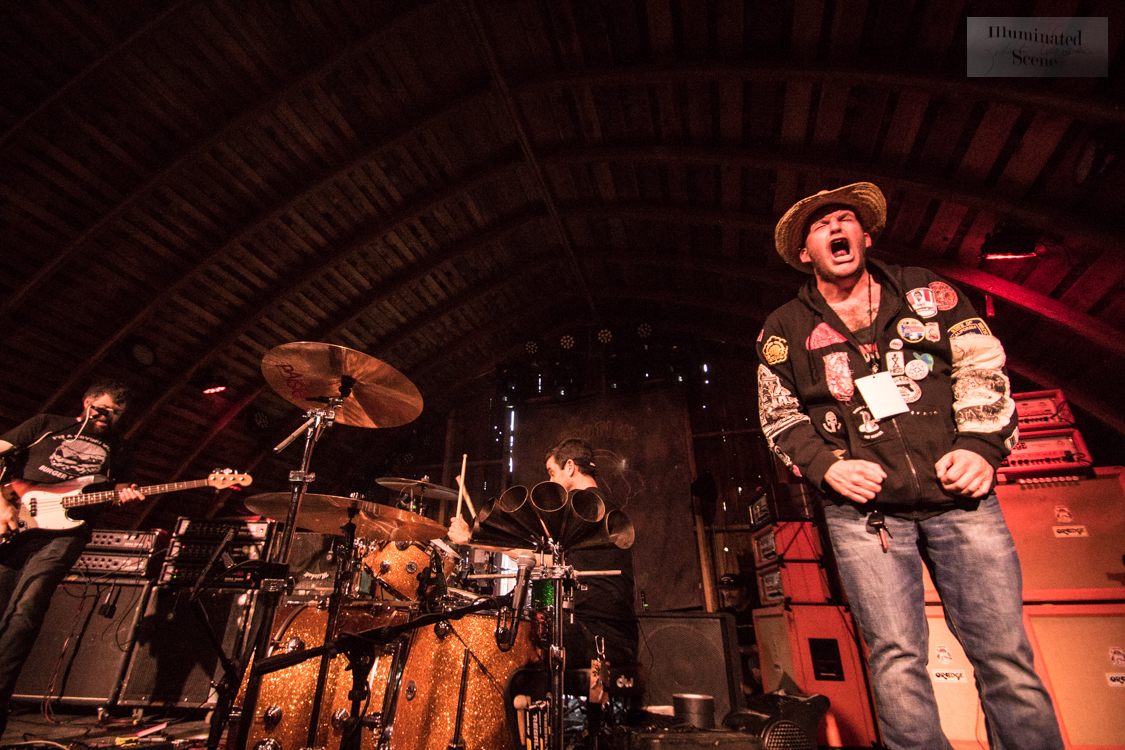
Big Business performing in 2019

Current members

- Jared Warren – bass guitar, lead vocals, synthesizer (2004–present)
- Coady Willis – drums, backing vocals (2004–present)

Former members

- Toshi Kasai – guitar, keyboards, backing vocals (2008–2012)
- Scott Martin – guitar, backing vocals (2010–2014)

Guest guitarists

- John Devoy ("O.G" and "Easter Romantic" on Head for the Shallow)
- Dave Hernandez ("Eis Hexe" and "Off Off Broadway" on Head for the Shallow)
- David Scott Stone (on Here Come the Waterworks)
- Dale Crover (live, 2007–2008)
- Joe Preston (live, 2017)

== Discography ==
=== Albums ===
- Head for the Shallow (2005; Hydra Head (CD), Wäntage USA (LP))
- Here Come the Waterworks (2007, Hydra Head)
- Mind the Drift (2009, Hydra Head)
- Battlefields Forever (2013, Gold Metal Records)
- Command Your Weather (2016, Joyful Noise / Gold Metal Records)
- The Beast You Are (2019, Joyful Noise / Gold Metal Records)

=== EPs and singles ===
- Tour EP (2004, Wäntage USA)
- Tour EP II (2006, self-released)
- Tour EP III (2008, self-released)
- Biz Bot Remixes (2009, Hydra Head)
- Quadruple Single (2011, Gold Metal Records)
- "Battlefields" / "Into the Light" (Tour 7" single) (2012, Gold Metal Records)
- "Blacker Holes" (2014, Joyful Noise)
- True Gold Digital Single (2015, Gold Metal Records)
- Tour EP 4 (2018, Gold Metal Records)
- Tour EP V (2021)

=== Compilations ===
- Dope-Guns-'N-Fucking in the Streets Volume Thirteen: "You Need Surgery" (2014, Amphetamine Reptile Records)
- Solid Gold Metal (2004–2009) (2018, Joyful Noise)
