= Tres Cabrones =

2013 album

Studio album by Melvins
- Released: November 5, 2013
- Recorded: 2012–2013
- Genres: Sludge metal, experimental rock
- Length: 44:53
- Language: English
- Label: Ipecac

Melvins chronology
Everybody Loves Sausages (2013)	Tres Cabrones (2013)	Hold It In (2014)

Tres Cabrones is the 19th album by the Melvins, released on November 5, 2013. It features their original drummer Mike Dillard, with current drummer Dale Crover playing bass. It is the first official album to feature Mike Dillard, as his only previous appearances were on the archival Mangled Demos from 1983 and a handful of compilation and bootleg releases. The album title translates as "three bastards" from Spanish.

Nine songs were previously released in various limited releases through Amphetamine Reptile Records:

- 1983 EP with "Psycho-Delic Haze", "Stump Farmer", "Stick Em' Up Bitch" and "Walter's Lips"; 10-inch vinyl and letterpress CD in 2012.
- Gaylord 7-inch with "City Dump", "You're in the Army Now" and "99 Bottles of Beer", summer 2013.
- "American Cow" was released on 10-inch and CD as part of the BASH 13 compilation with Mudhoney, Negative Approach, Die Kreuzen, Hepa-Titus and Gay Witch Abortion.
- "Dr. Mule" was available for free download on the 10 Years of Scion compilation and later released on a split 7-inch with Helmet.

"I Told You I Was Crazy" and "Tie My Pecker To A Tree" were later released together as a 7-inch release in December 2013. "Dogs and Cattle Prods" was released as part 11 of the Sugar Daddy Live split series.

"Walter's Lips" is a cover of The Lewd, which had been previously recorded as an instrumental by the original lineup and released as "Walter" on Mangled Demos from 1983. "Stick Em' Up Bitch" begins as an original composition then becomes a cover of "Fascists Eat Donuts" by Pop-O-Pies.

== Critical reception ==
Professional ratings
Review scores
Source	Rating
Blabbermouth	8/10
Consequence of Sound	3.5/5 stars
NME	6/10
PopMatters	6/10 stars
Allmusic	3.5/5 stars

== Track listing ==
No.	Title	Writer	Length
1.	"Doctor Mule"	Osborne	4:19
2.	"City Dump"	Osborne	3:30
3.	"American Cow"	Osborne	3:42
4.	"Tie My Pecker to a Tree"	Traditional	1:03
5.	"Dogs and Cattle Prods"	Osborne	8:58
6.	"Psychodelic Haze"	Osborne	4:11
7.	"99 Bottles of Beer"	Traditional	1:18
8.	"I Told You I Was Crazy"	Osborne	6:54
9.	"Stump Farmer"	Osborne	2:22
10.	"In the Army Now"	Traditional	1:10
11.	"Walter's Lips"	The Lewd	3:12
12.	"Stick'em Up Bitch"	Osborne/Pop-O-Pies	4:14

== Personnel ==
- King Buzzo - vocals, guitar, bass, percussion, stylophone
- Dale Crover - bass, drums, percussion, vocals
- Mike Dillard - drums, percussion, vocals

=== Additional personnel ===
- Toshi Kasai - engineer, omnichord & toy piano
- John Golden - mastering
- Mackie Osborne - design
