= Freak Puke =

Studio album by Melvins Lite
- Released: June 5, 2012
- Recorded: December 2011–January 2012
- Genre: Alternative rock
- Length: 42:14
- Label: Ipecac
- Producer: Toshi Kasai, Melvins

Melvins Lite chronology
The Bulls & the Bees (2012)	Freak Puke (2012)	Everybody Loves Sausages (2013)

Professional ratings
Review scores
Source	Rating
AllMusic	3.5/5 stars
Pitchfork	6.7/10
Consequence	C−
I Heart Noise	3.8/5
Punknews.org	4/5 stars
Loudwire	Favorable
PopMatters	6/10
The Line of Best Fit	6.5/10

Freak Puke is the eighteenth album by the Melvins, under the name Melvins Lite, released on June 5, 2012, through Ipecac Recordings. It is the first to feature one of the Melvins' alternate lineups with Trevor Dunn on standup bass.

== Track listing ==
All tracks are written by Melvins, except where noted.

Freak Puke track listing
No.	Title	Writer(s)	Length
1.	"Mr. Rip-Off"		5:52
2.	"Inner Ear Rupture"		1:56
3.	"Baby Won’t You Weird Me Out"		3:50
4.	"Worm Farm Waltz"		3:54
5.	"A Growing Disgust"		4:28
6.	"Leon Versus the Revolution"		2:47
7.	"Holy Barbarians"		2:31
8.	"Freak Puke"		2:46
9.	"Let Me Roll It"	McCartney	4:30
10.	"Tommy Goes Berserk"		9:40
Total length:			42:14

== Vinyl version ==
Freak Puke was released on vinyl through Amphetamine Reptile Records in a box featuring the album cover. Inside would be a picture disc depicting the album cover on one side and one of five different artists on the other. The five artists chosen to provide the artwork were Skinner, Dave Cooper, Tara McPherson, Gary Taxali and Mackie Osborne.

== Personnel ==
- King Buzzo – guitars, vocals
- Dale Crover – drums, vocals
- Trevor Dunn – standup bass, vocals

with

- James McAleer – backing vocals (track 9)
- Dan Raymond – backing vocals & additional guitars (track 9)

=== Additional personnel ===
- Toshi Kasai – engineering
- John Golden – mastering
- Mackie Osborne – artwork
