= The Bride Screamed Murder =

Studio album by Melvins
- Released: June 1, 2010
- Recorded: 2009–2010
- Genre: Sludge metal
- Length: 45:37
- Label: Ipecac Recordings

Melvins chronology
Chicken Switch (2009)	The Bride Screamed Murder (2010)	Sugar Daddy Live (2011)

Professional ratings
Aggregate scores
Source	Rating
Metacritic	77/100
Review scores
Source	Rating
AllMusic	3.5/5 stars
Eye Weekly	4/5 stars
musicOMH	4/5 stars
Pitchfork Media	(5.2/10)
Rock Sound	(9/10)

The Bride Screamed Murder is the seventeenth studio album by American rock band Melvins, released on June 1, 2010. It was their first album to hit the Billboard 200 Pop Charts, at number 200, selling 2,809 albums in the first few weeks. In October 2010, they released a music video with Scion Audio/Visual for the song "Electric Flower", directed by Mark Brooks. The title is a reference to a fictional book from the film Alice Doesn't Live Here Anymore.

Exclaim! named The Bride Screamed Murder the No. 8 metal album of 2010.

== Track listing ==
All songs written by the Melvins unless otherwise noted.

No.	Title	Writer(s)	Length
1.	"The Water Glass"		4:16
2.	"Evil New War God"		4:48
3.	"Pig House"		5:29
4.	"I'll Finish You Off"		4:57
5.	"Electric Flower"		3:27
6.	"Hospital Up"		5:38
7.	"Inhumanity and Death"		3:03
8.	"My Generation"	Pete Townshend	7:39
9.	"P.G. x 3"	unknown (traditional)	6:20

== Vinyl version ==
The Bride Screamed Murder's vinyl version was released on Amphetamine Reptile Records in a box featuring different artwork from one of ten different artists, limited to 100 copies each. The artists chosen to provide the artwork were Aesthetic Apparatus, COOP, Molly Osborne (Sold exclusively on tour), Adam Jones, Baseman, Junko Mizuno, Mackie Osborne, HAZE XXL, King Buzzo, and Dalek.

== Personnel ==
- King Buzzo – guitar, vocals
- Dale Crover – drums, vocals
- Coady Willis – drums, vocals
- Mr. Warren – bass, vocals

=== Additional personnel ===
- Toshi Kasai – engineer
- John Golden – mastering
- Mackie Osborne – art
