= A Walk with Love & Death =

Studio album by Melvins
- Released: July 7, 2017
- Studio: Sound of Sirens Studio
- Genre: Experimental rock
- Label: Ipecac
- Producers: Melvins, Toshi Kasai

Melvins chronology
Basses Loaded (2016)	A Walk with Love & Death (2017)	Pinkus Abortion Technician (2018)

Singles from A Walk with Love & Death
- 1. "Christ Hammer" Released: May 12, 2017; 2. "What's Wrong With You?" Released: June 23, 2017

Professional ratings
Aggregate scores
Source	Rating
AnyDecentMusic?	6.6/10
Metacritic	69/100
Review scores
Source	Rating
AllMusic	3.5/5 stars
The Line of Best Fit	9/10
musicOMH	4/5 stars
The Skinny	4/5 stars

A Walk with Love & Death is a double album and the 22nd album by American rock band Melvins, released on July 7, 2017, through Ipecac Recordings. It includes two distinct albums: Love, a fourteen-song soundtrack to a short film by Jesse Nieminen, also known as A Walk with Love & Death, and Death, made up of nine standard songs. This is the first full-length Melvins album to feature bassist Steven McDonald, who only appeared on four of the songs on their previous album, Basses Loaded. Guest musicians include Joey Santiago (Pixies), Anna Waronker (that dog.) and Teri Gender Bender (Le Butcherettes).

== Track listing ==
All songs written by the Melvins.

=== Love (Original Soundtrack) ===
No.	Title	Length
1.	"Aim High"	2:01
2.	"Queen Powder Party"	2:14
3.	"Street Level St. Paul"	2:18
4.	"The Hidden Joice"	1:11
5.	"Give It to Me"	2:49
6.	"Chicken Butt"	1:49
7.	"Eat Yourself Out"	5:03
8.	"Scooba"	1:09
9.	"Halfway to the Bakersfield Mall"	4:17
10.	"Pacoima Normal"	2:33
11.	"Park Head"	3:39
12.	"T-Burg"	4:10
13.	"Track Star"	5:02
14.	"The Asshole Bastard"	4:55

=== Death ===
No.	Title	Length
1.	"Black Heath"	6:41
2.	"Sober-delic (Acid Only)"	6:03
3.	"Euthanasia"	4:36
4.	"What's Wrong with You?"	2:36
5.	"Edgar the Elephant"	3:36
6.	"Flaming Creature"	4:22
7.	"Christ Hammer"	3:51
8.	"Cactus Party"	3:37
9.	"Cardboa Negro"	2:56

== Personnel ==
=== Love ===
- King Buzzo – guitar, vocals, theremin, modular synth, assorted noise
- Dale Crover – drums, vocals, assorted noise
- Steven McDonald – bass, vocals, assorted noise

with

- Toshi Kasai – assorted recordings, noise
- Joey Santiago – special guest guitar
- Anna Waronker – special guest backing vocals
- James Bartlett – special guest keyboards
- Tom Hazelmyer – special guest guitar

=== Death ===
- King Buzzo – guitar, vocals
- Dale Crover – drums, vocals
- Steven McDonald – bass, vocals

with

- Joey Santiago – extra guitar
- Anna Waronker – backing vocals
- Teri Gender Bender – backing vocals

=== Additional personnel ===
- Toshi Kasai – producer, engineer
- Steven McDonald – engineer
- John Golden – mastering
- Mackie Osborne – art
