= Enemymine =

American noise rock band

- Origin: Washington
- Genre: Noise rock
- Years active: 1998–2000
- Labels: Up Records, K Records
- Past members: Mike Kunka; Zak Sally; Danny Saski; Ryan Baldoz

Enemymine was a Washington-state-based indie rock band known for their very loud and abrasive music. The band consisted of three members; two bass guitarists and a drummer. Mike Kunka of godheadSilo played bass and provided vocals on all songs, while Zak Sally from Low also played bass and Danny Sasaki played drums. Ryan Baldoz replaced Sally on bass on "The Ice in Me." Enemymine has played shows with Jucifer, Melvins, Mindless Self Indulgence, Burning Brides, the Rapture, Melt Banana, among others. Before breaking up, the band released a self-titled EP on K Records and a full-length, The Ice in Me, on Up Records.

== Discography ==
Studio albums

- The Ice in Me (Up Records, 2000)

EPs

- Enemymine (K Records, 1999)
