= Houdini (album) =

1993 studio album by Melvins

Studio album by Melvins
- Released: September 21, 1993
- Recorded: 1992–1993
- Studios: Razor's Edge (San Francisco, California); Brilliant Studios (San Francisco, California)
- Genres: Sludge metal; stoner metal; doom metal; grunge
- Length: 54:44
- Label: Atlantic
- Producers: Melvins; Kurt Cobain; Garth Richardson

Melvins chronology
Lysol (1992)	Houdini (1993)	Prick (1994)

Singles from Houdini
- 1. "Honey Bucket" Released: August 30, 1993; 2. "Hooch" Released: 1993; 3. "Lizzy" Released: February 1, 1994

Houdini is the fifth studio album by American rock band Melvins, released on September 21, 1993, by Atlantic Records. The album was the band's major label debut after releasing their previous albums through the independent label Boner Records.

The album features a cover of the 1974 Kiss song "Goin' Blind". The songs "Hooch", "Lizzy", and "Honey Bucket" were released as singles with accompanying music videos. "Night Goat" is a partial re-recording of a song the band had released as a single in 1992. Nirvana's Kurt Cobain is given co-production credit alongside the Melvins on six tracks, for guitar on the song "Sky Pup" and percussion on the song "Spread Eagle Beagle".

== Background and recording ==
Melvins were signed, without a manager, to Atlantic Records by label president Danny Goldberg, at the enthusiastic suggestion of Kurt Cobain. Part of their deal ensured total creative control, with no label representatives allowed in the studio while the group recorded, and Atlantic was forbidden from sitting on or shelving their recordings if they were not satisfied with them. Houdini was the first of three albums they recorded for the company. Melvins vocalist and guitarist Buzz Osborne later said that he was surprised when Atlantic gave the band complete creative freedom and did not interfere with the sessions, stating the label "let us make the record we wanted to make." He added that the title Houdini nodded to the idea that the band might "disappear" from Atlantic after one album, though they ultimately released two more for the label — Stoner Witch (1994) and Stag (1996).

Kurt Cobain was accepted by Melvins as a producer for the album after an A&R representative at Atlantic Records, who also ran Cobain's management company, suggested him. Despite receiving a co-producer credit, the extent of Cobain's involvement in the album is questionable. Osborne said he ultimately decided to dismiss Cobain from the sessions after repeated absences, though he remained credited. Osborne also rejected later claims that Cobain had been asked to help write songs for the album, calling them a fabrication and noting that the band had already written the material. According to Osborne, Cobain contributed guitar to "Sky Pup" and percussion parts to "Spread Eagle Beagle."

Andrew Earles, who included Houdini on his book Gimmie Indie Rock (2014), stated that Cobain allegedly slept through most of the sessions. Jonathan Burnside, a collaborator of Melvins and engineer on Houdini, remembered: "It's not easy reminiscing about making the album Houdini with Kurt Cobain and the Melvins. Bad communication, drugs, major label profiteering, rehab, schedule blowouts, backstabbing, and album miscrediting... it was a devil's album." Speaking to Kerrang! in 2008, Osborne, who later said in 2009 that Cobain was "in no shape to produce anything", remembered:

"Houdini was the first album we did for Atlantic Records and certainly our biggest selling record, although not so much that I could put a down-payment on a new Rolls or something! It came on the whole tidal wave of Nirvana stuff and I'm sure if it weren't for that we wouldn't have had interest from a major at all. We wanted to do a record that wouldn't alienate our fans, but we wanted to do one that we would like. We also knew we weren’t gonna be dusting off a platinum album any time soon, you know? We did a bunch of sessions with Kurt Cobain [producing], but it got to the point where he was so out of control that we basically fired him and went our separate ways, which is unfortunate, because I think that would have been fun. Obviously that was a little snapshot of what would end up happening and I don't have a whole lot of fond memories of that – it was an absolute tragedy."

In addition to the production issues, the album's credited personnel also proved misleading. Although the album's liner notes credit Lorax as the band's bassist, she did not perform on the record. Osborne later stated: "This album is mostly just me and Dale Crover. Either I played bass or he did on almost all of it regardless of what the credits say…" Recording engineer Billy Anderson contributed bass to "Hag Me" and "Teet".

Osborne said that the band recorded and mixed the album in roughly two weeks, splitting sessions between Brilliant Studios and Razor's Edge in San Francisco, and the Laundry Room in Seattle. He described their recording process as focused on capturing drum tracks first, followed by overdubs of guitar, bass, and vocals, rather than recording live takes.

The album's cover art features an illustration by graphic designer Frank Kozik.

== Music and composition ==
Houdini features elements of sludge metal, grunge, and doom metal. Spin critic Jonathan Gold described the record as "not precisely an accessible mainstream album in the 'alternative' mode, not with its random-sounding ten-minute percussion solo, mumbled, cut'n'paste Beef-heartian lyrics, and tempos so slow they make Flipper seem as speedy as Slayer." Earles thought that the album showcases two different versions of Melvins: "a noticeably better variety of the slow, ungodly heavy, yet melodic off-kilter doom-metal with which the band had made its mark in previous years, and speedier fare, like a thick and weird sludge-thrash driven by catchy, inspired songwriting." AllMusic's Patrick Kennedy regarded the album as a "full fruition" of the outfit's "syrupy distillation of Sabbath riffage and Flipper's noisy anti-punk" that was originally pried open on their Eggnog (1991) and Bullhead (1991) releases.

Osborne stated that most of the songs on Houdini were written with the music completed first, with lyrics added afterward. Some, such as “Hooch,” began with improvised vocal sounds that were later retained as lyrics. He described the band's songwriting as heavily rhythm-driven, often building arrangements around distinctive drum patterns developed with Crover to enhance the guitar riffs and overall dynamics.

Several songs on the album were built around specific rhythmic or structural ideas. "Lizzy" was written to emphasize the dynamic contrast between loud and quiet sections, while "Honey Bucket" was conceived as an aggressive, fast-paced song with an unconventional structure. Written late in the process, "Hag Me" was influenced by Swans, Black Flag, and Miles Davis’s Bitches Brew, and was conceived as a slow, heavy track that contrasted with the album’s faster material.

"Pearl Bomb" features a ticking electronic beat, with percussion that has been compared to a stuck typewriter, while "Spread Eagle Beagle" is a "clanky percussion solo". Consisting solely of percussion, the latter track has been described as a prank; it does not build to a climax, as per Cream's "Toad" (1966) or Led Zeppelin's "Moby Dick" (1969), but rather "clatters obstinately until the distances between the drum thwacks grow so long that it's almost as if you’re listening to a parody of CD-era albums whose bonus tracks come after a long silence."

== Release and critical reception ==
Professional ratings
Review scores
Source	Rating
AllMusic	4.5/5 stars
Chicago Tribune	3/4 stars
Collector's Guide to Heavy Metal	7/10
Pitchfork	7.7/10
Spin	0.5/1 star

Houdini is considered Melvins' commercially biggest release. It has sold 110,000 copies and peaked at number 29 on Billboard's Heatseekers Albums chart. The track "Honey Bucket" also received MTV airplay.

AllMusic critic Patrick Kennedy wrote: "With their voluminous output and determination to continuously expand their sound regardless of musical trends, the Melvins oeuvre has begun to rival -- at least on paper -- the career arcs of Frank Zappa and Neil Young." Jonathan Gold of Spin stated: "A few sections are recorded so hot that the guitar distortion literally breaks up into white noise in your speakers; other songs—the hits—are classic Melvins tuneage, which means that they will make you wonder if the batteries are going dead in your boom-box." Chicago Tribune's Greg Kot thought that the album "asserts that a major-label deal hasn't watered them down a bit, though their king-size slam sounds clearer and punchier."

== Legacy ==
Treblezine named Houdini as one of the "10 Essential Sludge Metal Albums" and "The 30 Best Grunge Albums". Diffuser.fm rated it as number 10 on its list of "10 Best Grunge Albums". The track "Hooch" is rated as one of the best songs of the decade by Pitchfork in the book The Pitchfork 500: Our Guide to the Greatest Songs from Punk to the Present.

Mastodon drummer Brann Dailor listed the album as an influence.

In 2005, the album was performed live in its entirety as part of the All Tomorrow's Parties-curated Don't Look Back series. Subsequent performances of the album occurred over the next few years, such as their appearance at the Primavera Sound festival in 2007 and on the band's 25th Anniversary tour in 2009. A specially recorded live performance of the album was released as A Live History of Gluttony and Lust in 2006.

Largely out of print on vinyl since the 1990s, the album was reissued in 2016 through Third Man Records.

For the album's 30th anniversary, Osborne reflected that while Houdini was not a personal high point, it remained one of the band's most popular releases. He described it as "a fun thing to do, by and large, even with the problems we had with Cobain," noting that it helped the band reach a wider audience and "sold over a hundred thousand copies." Osborne added that he preferred the album's rawer production to the more polished sound of their later major-label releases Stoner Witch and Stag.

== Track listing ==
All songs written by the Melvins unless otherwise noted.

No.	Title	Writer(s)	Length
1.	"Hooch"		2:49
2.	"Night Goat"		4:41
3.	"Lizzy"		4:44
4.	"Goin' Blind" (Kiss cover)	Gene Simmons, Stephen Coronel	4:33
5.	"Honey Bucket"		3:01
6.	"Hag Me"		7:06
7.	"Set Me Straight"	Buzz Osborne, Mike Dillard, Matt Lukin	2:25
8.	"Sky Pup"		3:50
9.	"Joan of Arc"		3:36
10.	"Teet"		2:52
11.	"Copache"		2:07
12.	"Pearl Bomb"		2:46
13.	"Spread Eagle Beagle" (instrumental)		10:14
Total length:			54:44

Notes

- Vinyl copies include a cover of "Rocket Reducer No. 62 (Rama Lama Fa Fa Fa)", originally by MC5, instead of "Spread Eagle Beagle". A Japanese CD release (catalog# AMCY-625) also contains "Rocket Reducer No. 62 (Rama Lama Fa Fa Fa)" as the 14th track at the end of the disc, coming after "Spread Eagle Beagle".

== Personnel ==
Melvins

- Buzz Osborne – guitar, vocals, bass, producer, mixing, engineer
- Dale – drums, vocals, bass, producer, mixing, engineer
- Lorax – bass (8, 12)

Additional personnel

- Bill Bartell – bass (1-7, 9-11, 13), lead guitar (4)
- Billy Anderson – bass (6, 10); engineer (2–6, 8, 10–12), mixing (3–6, 10, 11)
- Kurt Cobain – guitar (8), percussion (13); producer (1, 7–9, 12, 13), mixing (1, 7)
- Al Smith – additional percussion (13)
- Mike Supple – additional percussion (13)

Production

- Jonathan Burnside – engineer (1, 2, 7–9, 12 and 13)
- Tom Doty – second engineer (1, 7)
- Garth Richardson – mixing (3–6, 9, 10, 13), producer (6, 10)
- Joe Marquez – second engineer (3–6, 9, 10, 13)
- Wolf Kessler – second engineer (6, 9, 10, 13)
- Lou Oribin – engineer (8, 12)
- Barrett Jones – engineer, mixing (11)
- Don Lewis – band photo
- Frank Kozik – art direction, illustration
- Valerie Wagner – art direction, design
- Stephen Marcussen – mastering

== Charts ==
Chart (1993)	Peak position
US Billboard Heatseekers	29
