= The Bulls & the Bees =

EP by Melvins
- Released: March 13, 2012
- Genre: Sludge metal; neoclassical; experimental; dark ambient
- Length: 23:33
- Label: Scion A/V

Melvins chronology
Sugar Daddy Live (2011)	The Bulls & the Bees (2012)	Freak Puke (2012)

The Bulls & the Bees is an EP by American rock band the Melvins, released on March 13, 2012 through Scion A/V for free download. It was also released as a free CD for their May 2012 tour with Unsane and released as a 10" vinyl later that year for the 51/51 tour. On June 2, 2015, an expanded CD containing the Electroretard album was released on Ipecac Recordings.

== Music and reception ==
Professional ratings
Review scores
Source	Rating
Punknews.org	4/5 stars
Spin	7/10
QRO Magazine	7.9/10

According to Christopher R. Weingarten of Spin, the EP features experiments with neoclassical and dark ambient styles while also continuing the rock sound of the band's last three LPs.

== Track listing ==
=== Original EP ===
No.	Title	Length
1.	"The War On Wisdom"	3:40
2.	"We Are Doomed"	7:03
3.	"Friends Before Larry"	4:19
4.	"A Really Long Wait"	4:22
5.	"National Hamster"	4:09

=== Electroretard (2015 CD re-release) ===
No.	Title	Writer(s)	Length
6.	"Shit Storm (Edit)"		1:01
7.	"Youth of America"	Sage	9:17
8.	"Gluey Porch Treatments"		0:47
9.	"Revolve"		4:20
10.	"Missing"	Cows	4:09
11.	"Lovely Butterflies"		6:02
12.	"Tipping the Lion"		3:48
13.	"Interstellar Overdrive"	Barrett, Waters, Wright, Mason	9:51

== Personnel ==
- King Buzzo – guitars, vocals
- Dale Crover – drums, vocals
- Coady Willis – drums, vocals
- Jared Warren – bass, vocals

=== Additional personnel ===
- Toshi Kasai – engineering
- John Golden – mastering
- Mackie Osborne – artwork
- Kevin Rutmanis – bass (7–11 on 2015 re-release)
- Mark Deutrom – bass (12–13 on 2015 re-release)
- Tim Green – engineering (6–11 on 2015 re-release)
- Michael Rozon – engineering (6–11 on 2015 re-release)
- Joe Barresi – engineering (12–13 on 2015 re-release)
