= Thelema (EP) =

EP by Murder City Devils
- Released: September 4, 2001
- Genre: Punk rock
- Length: 20:59
- Label: Sub Pop Records

Murder City Devils chronology
In Name and Blood (2000)	Thelema (2001)	R.I.P. (2003)

Thelema is an EP by the Murder City Devils released on September 4, 2001 on Sub Pop Records. It is their last release of entirely original material before they broke up later that year. Spencer Moody has said that it was "really my favorite stuff overall." To support the EP, the band went on a tour in October 2001, which continued as previously planned despite the sudden departure of the band's keyboardist, Leslie Hardy. It was reissued on vinyl on February 17, 2009.

== Reception ==
Professional ratings
Review scores
Source	Rating
Allmusic	3/5 stars
PopMatters	(mixed)
Robert Christgau	(1-star Honorable Mention)
Washington City Paper	(mixed)

AllMusic's Tom Semioli wrote that "Despite the album's short running time, the Murder City Devils cover a lot of ground on this outing." Some of the Murder City Devils' fans were unhappy with the EP, because it included more catchy hooks and complex song structures than their previous work. In 2003, Pitchfork Media's Amanda Petrusich wrote that the EP contains "some decent melodies and a lot more attention to instrumentation– and structure– than their previous albums."

== Track listing ==
1. That's What You Get – 2:49
2. Bear Away – 3:27
3. Midnight Service at the Mütter Museum – 3:39
4. One Vision of May – 2:28
5. Bride of the Elephant Man – 3:58
6. 364 Days – 4:38
