= The World at Large =

Single by Modest Mouse

from the album Good News for People Who Love Bad News
- Released: 2005
- Recorded: 2003
- Genre: Indie rock
- Length: 4:32
- Label: Epic
- Songwriters: Isaac Brock, Dann Gallucci, Eric Judy, and Benjamin Weikel
- Producer: Dennis Herring

Modest Mouse singles chronology
"Ocean Breathes Salty" (2004)	"The World at Large" (2005)	"Dashboard" (2007)

"The World at Large" is the third promo release by indie rock band Modest Mouse. It was recorded in 2003 and was featured on their 2004 album Good News for People Who Love Bad News. It was not until after the album's release that Isaac Brock and the band decided to release it as a promo. It is about someone who cannot stop moving, so they move on to new towns and cities to explore around the world, as stated in the lyrics: "if the world's at large, why should I remain?" and "...you still have your words and you got your friends".

== Track listing ==
1. "The World at Large" – 4:32

== Personnel ==
- Isaac Brock - Vocals, Rhodes, Whistle, Piano
- Eric Judy - Acoustic Guitar, Percussion
- Dann Gallucci - Guitar, Mellotron, Timpani, Percussion
- Benjamin Weikel - Drums

== Certifications ==
Region	Certification	Certified units/sales
United States (RIAA)	Gold	500,000^{‡}
^{‡} Sales+streaming figures based on certification alone.
