= Jared Warren =

American musician

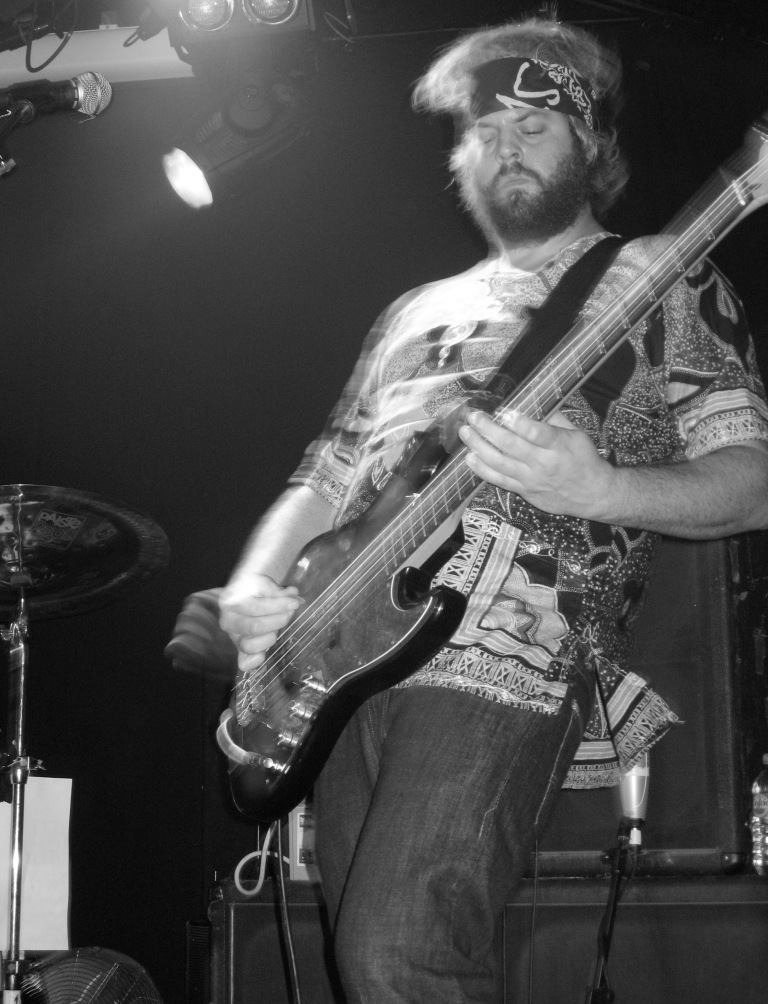
- Warren in 2009

Background information
- Born: Jared Michael Warren
- Occupation(s): Musician, songwriter
- Instrument: Bass
- Years active: 1990–present
- Member of: Unwound, Big Business
- Formerly of: Melvins, Karp, Tight Bros from Way Back When, The Whip, White Shit

Jared Michael Warren is an American musician who is the bassist of Big Business (alongside drummer Coady Willis) and formerly the Melvins, KARP, Tight Bros from Way Back When, The Whip. He is also currently the bassist for Unwound.

== Career ==
Warren was the founding bassist of the Tumwater, Washington band Karp, which formed in 1990 and was active until 1998.

Both Warren and Willis joined the Melvins in January 2006 and appear on (A) Senile Animal as well as 2008's Nude with Boots and 2010's album The Bride Screamed Murder. Warren was previously a member of bands Karp, Tight Bros from Way Back When, White Shit, and The Whip. He also contributed vocals to the song "Breaking Rocks" on the album Forging Steel and Laying Stone by Akimbo.

In September 2022, Sara Lund from Unwound revealed in an interview with Pitchfork that Warren was recruited to play bass on the band's reunion tour, replacing late bassist and friend, Olympia punk rock legend Vern Rumsey.

== Select discography ==
=== Karp ===
- 1994: Mustaches Wild
- 1995: Suplex
- 1997: Self Titled LP

=== Tight Bros from Way Back When ===
- 1999: Running Thru My Bones
- 2001: Lend You a Hand

=== Big Business ===
- 2005: Head for the Shallow
- 2007: Here Come the Waterworks
- 2009: Mind the Drift
- 2011: Quadruple Single (EP)
- 2013: Battlefields Forever
- 2016: Command Your Weather
- 2019: The Beast You Are

=== Melvins ===
- 2006: (A) Senile Animal
- 2008: Nude with Boots
- 2010: The Bride Screamed Murder
- 2011: Sugar Daddy Live (live album)
- 2012: The Bulls & the Bees (EP)
- 2013: Everybody Loves Sausages (select songs)
- 2016: Basses Loaded (on the song "Choco Plumbing")
