= Battlefields Forever =

Studio album by Big Business
- Released: October 31, 2013
- Studio: Entourage Studios (North Hollywood, California)
- Genre: Heavy metal
- Label: Gold Metal Records
- Producer: Big Business and Dave Curran

Big Business chronology
Mind the Drift (2009)	Battlefields Forever (2013)	Command Your Weather (2016)

Professional ratings
Review scores
Source	Rating
PunkNews	3.5/5 stars
Pitchfork	8.0/10 stars

Battlefields Forever is the fourth studio album by American heavy metal band Big Business. It was recorded at Entourage Studios in North Hollywood, California.

== Track listing ==
1. "Chump Chance" – 2:20
2. "No Vowels" – 3:48
3. "Battlefields" – 4:35
4. "Trees" – 6:11
5. "Aurum" – 1:33
6. "Doomsday, Today!" – 4:09
7. "Heavy Shoes" – 3:30
8. "Our Mutant" – 2:05
9. "Lonely Lyle" – 9:18

== Personnel ==
Big Business

- Jared Warren – bass, vocals
- Coady Willis – drums, vocals
- Scott Martin – guitar, vocals

Technical personnel

- Dave Curran and Big Business – producing
- Dave Curran – recording
- Andrew Schneider and Dave Curran – mixing
- Scott Martin – mixing on "Aurum"
- Carl Saff – mastering
