= Dann Gallucci =

American songwriter

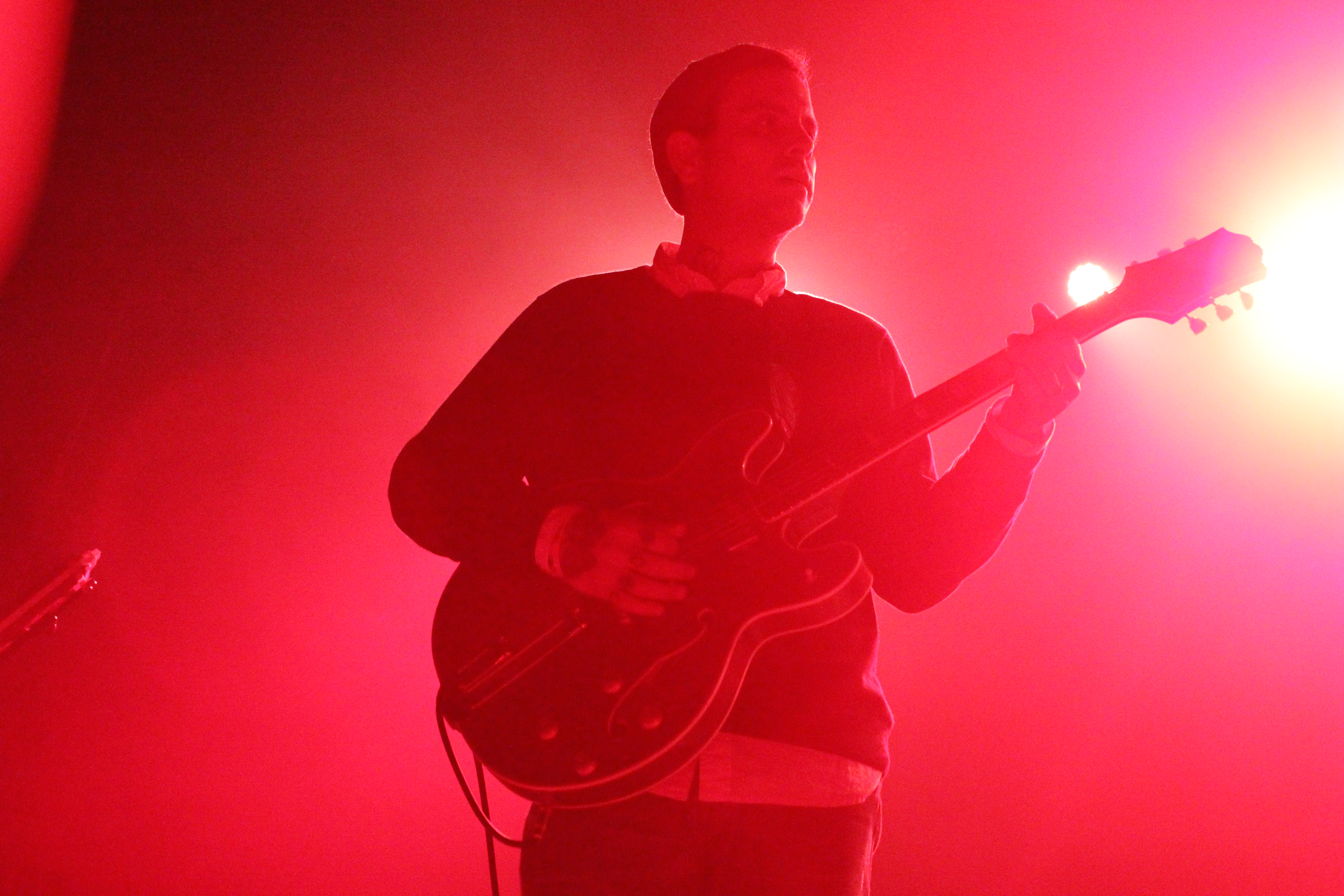
- Gallucci with Cold War Kids in 2013

Background information
- Born: Dann Michael Gallucci; March 31, 1975 (age 51)
- Genres: Indie rock, alternative rock, punk rock
- Occupations: Record producer, songwriter, musician, audio engineer
- Instruments: Guitar, organ, keyboards
- Years active: 1993–present
- Labels: Sub Pop, Epic, Downtown
- Website: danngallucci.com

Dann Michael Gallucci (born March 31, 1975) is an American songwriter, producer, musician and audio engineer best known for his work with Modest Mouse, The Murder City Devils, and Cold War Kids. Born and raised in the Pacific Northwest, Gallucci met Modest Mouse's Isaac Brock in Seattle, Washington in 1993, playing guitar with the band intermittently before joining full-time to record several singles that would eventually appear on the album Sad Sappy Sucker, released by independent record label K Records in 2001.

While in Modest Mouse, Gallucci co-founded the punk bands Area 51 and Death Wish Kids, featuring members that would go on to form The Murder City Devils. Area 51 recorded one single with Nation of Ulysses' Tim Green, and Death Wish Kids would record two singles before disbanding.

The Murder City Devils formed in 1996, consisting of members Spencer Moody, Dann Gallucci, Derek Fudesco, Coady Willis and Nate Manny. That year, the band released two singles, Three Natural Sixes (Hopscotch Records #5) and Dance Hall Music (Empty Records MTR-354), and signed with the Die Young Stay Pretty label, a subsidiary of Sub Pop. Their self-titled debut album was released in 1997.

In 1996, Gallucci co-wrote and played guitar on the Modest Mouse songs "Trailer Trash" and "Bankrupt on Selling," which appeared on the album The Lonesome Crowded West, released by Up Records in 1997. Pitchfork Media ranked "Trailer Trash" #63 in their list "The Top 200 Tracks of the 1990s."

In 1998, The Murder City Devils released their second full-length album, Empty Bottles, Broken Hearts. The album saw an increased use of electric organ, and that same year they recruited Leslie Hardy as their full-time keyboard player. To support the record, the band embarked on a yearlong North American tour, playing with At the Drive-In, Pearl Jam, and Built to Spill. After a short break, the band released their third full-length album In Name and Blood in 2000 followed by the Thelema EP in 2001. Keyboardist Leslie Hardy left the band mid-tour and was replaced by Nick Dewitt for their final concerts. The band's farewell concert on October 31, 2001, at Seattle's Showbox Theater was recorded and released by Sub Pop in 2003, titled R.I.P. and included two previously unrecorded songs. It was also released on DVD in 2005.

After the breakup of The Murder City Devils, Gallucci returned to Modest Mouse full-time from 2001 to 2005, co-writing and playing on the band's fourth full-length album, Good News for People Who Love Bad News, released by Epic on April 6, 2004. In addition to guitar, Gallucci played mellotron, keyboards, piano, glockenspiel, drum loops, timpani, and percussion. The first two singles from the album were "Float On" and "Ocean Breathes Salty," both of which debuted on American radio stations in the first half of 2004. According to Isaac Brock, Gallucci wrote the rhythm guitar part to "Float On."

The album was released to widespread acclaim from music critics. At Metacritic, which assigns a normalized rating out of 100 to reviews from mainstream critics, the album received an average score of 83, indicating "universal acclaim". Tiny Mix Tapes gave the album five out of five stars, saying, "Ultimately, what makes Good News so successful is that it retains the melancholy mood of past works, while at the same time adding depth and maturity." Spin gave it an A and said it was "Half expansive, burnished radio-rock, half swampy Delta hoodoo-hollerin' that reeks of Brock's Southern sojourn." Filter gave it a score of 92% and said that it would soon be "one of the best albums of 2004". Billboard gave it a favorable review and called it "a daring yet accessible disc". The New York Times also gave it a favorable review and called it "the best Modest Mouse album yet." It was Planet Sound's #1 Album of 2004. It was also nominated for a Grammy in 2005 for Best Alternative Album. The album was certified Platinum by the RIAA in August 2004. As of March 19, 2007, it had sold 1,509,675 copies in the United States.

In 2003, Gallucci formed the band A Gun Called Tension with Sean Reveron of The Beta Band, Exodus 77, and The Free Association. A mix of dancehall, hip hop, reggae and punk, the band released a self-titled album on Cold Crush in 2003.

Gallucci left Modest Mouse in 2005 to pursue a career in audio engineering and production. Graduating from The Conservatory of Recording Arts and Sciences in Phoenix, AZ in 2007, he spent a year and a half working at Seattle's Avast! Studios, where he assisted producer Phil Ek on several records. In addition, he worked on releases by the bands Triumph of Lethargy and Past Lives. In order to round out his audio engineering skills, Gallucci began touring as a live sound engineer. In 2008, he worked as monitor engineer for M.I.A., and from 2009 to 2011 he worked as front of house engineer for Cold War Kids, Miike Snow, The xx, and Warpaint.

In 2011, Gallucci recorded the single "Fashionable" for Cold War Kids, joining the band later that year to play guitar and produce their next record. In preparation, Gallucci and the band decided to build their San Pedro rehearsal space into a studio. Gallucci produced, engineered, and played on the album, while sharing mixing duties with Lars Stalfors. Dear Miss Lonely Hearts was released on April 2, 2013, on Downtown Records, debuting at number 51 on the Billboard 200. The single "Miracle Mile" reached #22 on the Billboard Alternative Songs chart, giving Cold War Kids at that point the highest-charting single of their career. Critics saw the album as a return to form for the band. Heather Phares of AllMusic felt the record played to the group's strengths: "Dear Miss Lonelyhearts is more about what the band does best rather than breaking new ground, and the result is some of Cold War Kids' most promising and satisfying music since their debut."

On October 21, 2014, Cold War Kids released their fifth full-length album, Hold My Home on Downtown Records. Again, Gallucci produced, engineered, and played on the record and co-mixed with Lars Stalfors. Hold My Home spawned two singles: "All This Could Be Yours" and "First", which became the band's new highest charting single, spending two months at number one on the Billboard Alternative Songs chart, over six months in the top five, and over eight months in the top ten. AllMusic's Heather Phares praised the production throughout the album, calling it the band's best work since Robbers & Cowards, concluding that, "with 'Hold My Home', they emerge as a more straightforward band, and also a more confident and engaging one." Philip Cosores of Paste credited new members Gallucci and Plummer for raising the album's taste level over the previous two records and giving the band a whole new identity.

Before leaving Cold War Kids in 2016, Gallucci produced, engineered, mixed (with Lars Stalfors), and played on the albums Dear Miss Lonelyhearts and Hold My Home, as well as the EPs Tuxedos, Five Quick Cuts, and A Million Eyes.

From 2011 to 2014, Gallucci would return to Modest Mouse on an intermittent basis, eventually co-writing three songs on their album Strangers to Ourselves. Additionally, Gallucci played on recording sessions with Modest Mouse and OutKast's Big Boi at the rapper's Stankonia Studios in Atlanta, GA.

In 2016, Gallucci became the producer of the public radio show Bullseye with Jesse Thorn.

Notable awards and achievements:

- Gold Album – Modest Mouse, Good News for People Who Love Bad News (2005) Platinum Album – Modest Mouse, Good News for People Who Love Bad News (2005)
- Grammy Nomination, Best Alternative Album – Modest Mouse, Good News for People Who Love Bad News (2005)
- Grammy Nomination, Song of the Year – Modest Mouse, "Float On" (2005)
- 3 x Platinum – Lupe Fiasco, "The Show Goes On" (2011)
- Grammy Nomination, Best Rap Song – Lupe Fiasco, "The Show Goes On" (2011)
- ASCAP Songwriter of the Year Award – Lupe Fiasco, "The Show Goes On" (2011)
