= Never Breathe What You Can't See =

Studio album by Jello Biafra with the Melvins
- Released: October 19, 2004
- Recorded: 2004
- Genre: Hardcore punk
- Length: 40:15
- Label: Alternative Tentacles
- Producers: Ali G. North, Marshall Lawless

Jello Biafra chronology
| Machine Gun in the Clown's Hand (2002) | Never Breathe What You Can't See (2004) | Sieg Howdy! (2005) |

Melvins chronology
| Pigs of the Roman Empire (2004) | Never Breathe What You Can't See (2004) | Mangled Demos from 1983 (2005) |

Professional ratings
Review scores
| Source | Rating |
|---|---|
| AllMusic | 3.5/5 stars |
| Pitchfork | 7.3/10 |
| Punknews.org | 5/5 stars |

Never Breathe What You Can't See is a studio album by Jello Biafra and the Melvins, released in 2004 through Alternative Tentacles.

Songs recorded during the same sessions and remixes of four songs were used for the follow-up album, Sieg Howdy!, released in 2005.

== Track listing ==
- All songs written by Buzz Osborne and lyrics by Jello Biafra, except where noted.
1. "Plethysmograph" (Music: Biafra) – 4:49
2. "McGruff the Crime Dog" – 4:18
3. "Yuppie Cadillac" (Music: Biafra) – 4:31
4. "Islamic Bomb" (Music: Biafra) – 6:19
5. "The Lighter Side of Global Terrorism" – 4:35
6. "Caped Crusader" (Music: Biafra, Osborne) – 6:08
7. "Enchanted Thoughtfist" – 4:18
8. "Dawn of the Locusts" – 5:12

== Personnel ==
- Osama McDonald – vocals
- Jon Benet Milosevic – guitars, backing vocals
- George W. McVeigh – bass, slide bass (8)
- Saddam Disney – drums, percussion, lead guitar (3, 5)

with

- Adam Jones – guitars (4, 6–8)

Additional personnel

- Tom 5 – backing vocals
- John The Baker – backing vocals
- Adrienne Droogas – backing vocals
- Wendy-O-Matik – backing vocals
- Loto Ball – backing vocals
- Johnny NoMoniker – backing vocals
- Ali G. North – backing vocals, producer
- Lady Monster – backing vocals
- Jesse Luscious – backing vocals
- Marshall Lawless – producer
- Toshi Kasai – engineer, mixing
- Matt Kelley – engineer
- Drew Fischer – engineer
- Javier E. Javier – asst. engineer
- Mackie Osborne – art direction & design
