= Bases Loaded =

Bases loaded is a baseball term meaning runners on first, second, and third base.

Bases Loaded may also refer to:

- Bases Loaded (video game)
- Basses Loaded, an album by the Melvins
