= Sieg Howdy! =

Studio album by Jello Biafra with The Melvins
- Released: September 26, 2005
- Recorded: 2004
- Genre: Punk rock
- Length: 47:59
- Label: Alternative Tentacles (Virus350)
- Producer: Ali G. North, Marshall Lawless

Jello Biafra chronology
Never Breathe What You Can't See (2004)	Sieg Howdy! (2005)	In the Grip of Official Treason (2006)

The Melvins chronology
Mangled Demos from 1983 (2005)	Sieg Howdy! (2005)	A Live History of Gluttony and Lust (2006)

Professional ratings
Review scores
Source	Rating
AllMusic	4/5 stars
Blabbermouth.net	7.5/10
Terrorizer	8.5/10

Sieg Howdy! is the second album by Jello Biafra and The Melvins. It consists of songs recorded during the same sessions that produced their first collaboration Never Breathe What You Can't See but not used on that album, plus remixes of four songs from the first album.

The opening track, a cover of the Alice Cooper classic "Halo of Flies", has special significance for Biafra and The Melvins, as Biafra had heard The Melvins cover it when he first witnessed the group perform live.

Also featured on the album is an updated version of "California über alles" with new lyrics by Biafra about the recall campaign that placed Arnold Schwarzenegger in the California governor's office, as well as "Those Dumb Punk Kids (Will Buy Anything)", a song where Biafra openly criticizes his former Dead Kennedys bandmates.

The remix of "Enchanted Thoughtfist" is the first time Biafra and his fellow co-conspirator in Lard, Al Jourgensen of Ministry, have collaborated on a recording since the sessions for Pure Chewing Satisfaction and 70's Rock Must Die.

== Track listing ==
All lyrics are written by Jello Biafra; all music is composed by Buzz Osborne (except where noted)

No.	Title	Writer(s)	Length
1.	"Halo of Flies"	Cooper/Smith/Dunaway/Bruce/Buxton	7:43
2.	"Lighter Side of Global Terrorism" (Extended Space-Melt Version)		7:55
3.	"Lessons in What Not to Become"	Biafra	4:05
4.	"Those Dumb Punk Kids (Will Buy Anything)"		3:14
5.	"Wholly Buy Bull"		2:33
6.	"Voted Off the Island"	Biafra	0:50
7.	"Kali-Fornia über alles 21st Century" (Live)	Biafra/John Greenway	3:18
8.	"Dawn of the Locust" (March of The Locusts Deadverse Remix)		5:40
9.	"Enchanted Thoughtfist" (Enchanted Al Remix)		5:08
10.	"Caped Crusader" (Subway Gas/Hello Kitty Mix)	Biafra (words); Biafra/Osborne (music)	7:33

In the track listing on the back of the CD and booklet it lists "Kali-Fornia über alles 21st Century (Live)" as 5, "Wholly Buy-Bull" as 6, and "Voted Off the Island" as 7.

== Personnel ==
- J Lo – lead vocals
- Kim Jong Buzzo – guitar, backing vocals
- Kevin Rutmaninoff – bass (1–6, 8–10)
- Dale E. Sitty – drums, backing vocals

with

- Adam Jones – guitar (3, 7–10)
- Dave "The Incredible Hulk" Stone – bass (7), backing vocals
- Mike Scaccia – additional guitar (9)

=== Additional personnel ===
- Marshall Lawless – backing vocals, producer
- Ali G. North – backing vocals, producer
- Jesse Luscious – backing vocals
- Lady Monster – backing vocals
- Tom 5 – backing vocals
- Adrienne Droogas – backing vocals
- John the Baker – backing vocals
- Loto Ball – backing vocals
- Wendy-O-Matic – backing vocals
- Johnny NoMoniker – backing vocals
- Toshi Kasai – engineer
- Matt Kelley – engineer
- Andy Gregg – live sound and recording on track 7 (Seattle, WA: 12/30/04)
- Shawn Simmons – live sound and recording on track 7 (Seattle, WA: 12/30/04)
- Jack Endino – mixing on track 7
- Al Jourgensen – remixing on track 9
- Marco A. Ramirez – engineer on track 9
- Dälek – Remixing on track 8
- Deaf Nephews (Dale Crover & Toshi Kasai) – remixing on track 10
- Camille Rose Garcia – illustrations
- Mackie Osborne – design
