= Houdini Live 2005: A Live History of Gluttony and Lust =

A Live History of Gluttony and Lust

Live album by The Melvins
- Released: May 16, 2006
- Recorded: 2005
- Genre: Sludge metal, hardcore punk
- Length: 59:13
- Label: Ipecac
- Producer: The Melvins

The Melvins chronology
Sieg Howdy! (2005)	A Live History of Gluttony and Lust (2006)	(A) Senile Animal (2006)

Professional ratings
Review scores
Source	Rating
Allmusic	4/5 stars
Pitchfork Media	(5.7)

Houdini Live 2005: A Live History of Gluttony and Lust is an album by the Melvins, which was released in 2006 through Ipecac Recordings. It is a live rendition of their 1993 album Houdini.

== Background and recording ==
In 2005, the Melvins were invited to play Houdini in its entirety by All Tomorrow's Parties for their Don't Look Back series. After performing, the band thought it would make for a good live album, but they had not recorded their set. Consequently, the band then rented an empty warehouse and played the set to an invitation-only crowd. The band played and recorded two sets, picking the best performances from each for the final album.

== Track listing ==
1. "Pearl Bomb" (Melvins) – 1:39
2. "Hooch" (Melvins) – 2:33
3. "Night Goat" (Melvins) – 7:36
4. "Lizzy" (Melvins) – 4:49
5. "Goin' Blind" (Simmons/Coronel) – 4:34
6. "Cop-Ache" (Melvins) – 1:54
7. "Set Me Straight" (Melvins) / "Deserted Cities of the Heart" (Bruce/Brown) – 2:51
8. "Sky Pup" (Melvins) – 3:17
9. "Teet" (Melvins) – 2:45
10. "Joan of Arc" (Melvins) – 4:19
11. "Honey Bucket" (Melvins) – 2:21
12. "Hag Me" (Melvins) – 8:05
13. "Spread Eagle Beagle" (Melvins) – 12:30

== Personnel ==
- King Buzzo – guitar, vocals, extra percussion (track 13), liner notes
- Dale Crover – drums, vocals
- Trevor Dunn – bass guitar, vocals, extra percussion (track 13)

with

- Lustmord – extra percussion (track 13)

=== Additional personnel ===
- Toshi Kasai– engineer
- Edmundo Gomez– assistant engineer
- Paul Barros Bessone– assistant engineer
- Mackie Osborne– design
