= GodheadSilo =

American rock band

godheadSilo
- Origin: Moorhead, Minnesota, United States
- Genres: Noise rock, stoner rock, sludge metal
- Years active: 1991–1998, 2015–present
- Labels: Kill Rock Stars, Sub Pop
- Members: Dan Haugh; Mike Kunka
- Past members: Phil Leitch

godheadSilo is an American noise rock duo formed in Moorhead, Minnesota, that later moved to Olympia, Washington, before disbanding and moving to different parts of the country. The duo is composed of bassist Mike Kunka and drummer Dan Haugh, who had grown up together in Moorhead, Minnesota.

They were known for their loud "wall of sound" live performances, which were full of raging drums, screaming and a gigantic heavy bass sound. Mike employed many effects pedals and a large wall of amps to create his thunderous sound. The group's sound is considered to be damaging, for both members of the band experience discomfort from the low bass tone of their music.

== History ==
godheadSilo originally started in 1991 as a three-piece, with Phil Leitch playing guitar. Leitch left the band after their first show at Fargo's Moose Lodge. From then on, the band recorded and performed as a two-piece. Their debut was their contribution to the Moo Bob Records compilation album Nodak: Distorted Hallucinations with the track "Pull" from 1992.

The group relocated to Olympia, Washington, and signed with local indie label Kill Rock Stars. They recorded and released their debut The Scientific Supercake L.P. in 1994 for Kill Rock Stars. When the album is played with the bass settings set to maximum, the album can cause damage to speakers and stereo systems. After going through with a five-week long tour with Sebadoh, the group were signed to Sub Pop, who subsequently released their next two full-lengths Skyward in Triumph in 1996 and Share the Fantasy in 1998. Although the band has been on hiatus since the release of Share the Fantasy in 1998, Mike and Dan joined forces with Murder City Devils vocalist Spencer Moody in a band called Smoke and Smoke, releasing the album Love Suffers Long in 2004.

"Godheadsilo never really broke up," says Haugh, who lives in New Orleans. "I had a horrible accident, lost my ability to play drums for several years, and it was just kind of like a fade-away kind of thing." "I had an accident where my hand was almost cut off completely," Haugh says. "The doctors were like, 'You'll never play drums again.' A few years of intense physical and occupational therapy got it working again. It's still pretty wonky, but it can hold a drumstick just fine."

In 2015, godheadSilo reunited to play a concert in commemoration of Ralph's Corner, a Moorhead, Minnesota, music venue that closed in 2005. On April 1, 2016, Three Men and a Baby, a collaborative album between the Melvins and Mike Kunka, was released by Sub Pop. The album, for which the Melvins recorded their parts back in 1998, was shelved and uncompleted until recently when Kunka and the Melvins finished it.

The band did a short American tour in January 2017. Only ten shows were planned. When asked about the future of the band, Haugh showed interest in recording while Kunka did not.

== Discography ==
Studio albums

- The Scientific Supercake L.P. (Kill Rock Stars, 1994)
- Skyward in Triumph (Sub Pop, 1996)
- Share the Fantasy (Sub Pop, 1998)

EPs

- Thee Friendship Village E.P. (Kill Rock Stars, 1993)
- Elephantitus of the Night (Kill Rock Stars, 1995)
- Booby Trap (Sub Pop, 1996)
