= Everybody Loves Sausages =

2013 studio album by Melvins

Studio album by Melvins
- Released: April 30, 2013
- Recorded: 2011–2013
- Genre: Experimental rock
- Length: 52:03
- Language: English
- Label: Ipecac
- Producer: The Melvins

Melvins chronology
Freak Puke (2012)	Everybody Loves Sausages (2013)	Tres Cabrones (2013)

Professional ratings
Review scores
Source	Rating
Decibel Magazine	7/10 stars
The Skinny	4/5 stars
Sputnikmusic	3.8/5

Everybody Loves Sausages is an album of cover songs by the Melvins, released on April 30, 2013. Like The Crybaby, it features guests on most of the tracks. It features the Melvins Lite on three tracks.

Three of the tracks had been previously released in splits. Black Betty previously appeared on a split 7-inch with the Jon Spencer Blues Explosion covering the same track. Female Trouble and Carpe Diem are featured on a split 12-inch with Redd Kross. A nine-part 7-inch Tribute series was released through Amphetamine Reptile Records between 2013 and 2015. Featuring ten songs from the album, seven of them featured bonus cover songs of each respective band.

== Track listing ==
No.	Title	Writer(s)	Original artist	Length
1.	"Warhead"	Anthony Bray, Jeffrey Dunn, Conrad Lant	Venom	4:40
2.	"Best Friend"	John Deacon	Queen	2:31
3.	"Black Betty"	Traditional, arranged by Huddie Ledbetter	Lead Belly	1:47
4.	"Set It on Fire"	Kim Salmon	The Scientists	2:36
5.	"Station to Station"	David Bowie	David Bowie	11:20
6.	"Attitude"	Ray Davies	The Kinks	3:32
7.	"Female Trouble"	John Waters	Divine	3:10
8.	"Carpe Diem"	Tuli Kupferberg	The Fugs	3:05
9.	"Timothy Leary Lives"		Pop-O-Pies	2:03
10.	"In Every Dream Home a Heartache"	Bryan Ferry	Roxy Music	9:04
11.	"Romance"	Pat Stratford, Lyon Wong, Steve Hunt, Geoff Magner, Mike Hunter	Tales of Terror	2:57
12.	"Art School"	Paul Weller	The Jam	3:15
13.	"Heathen Earth"		Throbbing Gristle	4:03

"Heathen Earth" is not a cover, but a new song in the style of Throbbing Gristle, named after one of their albums. Osborne stated in an interview with Spin Magazine "This is Throbbing Gristle's Heathen Earth in the style of what Throbbing Gristle would do."

=== Tribute Series ===
==== Vol. 1: A Tribute to the Scientists ====
No.	Title	Length
1.	"Set It on Fire (The Scientists)"	2:37
2.	"Swampland (The Scientists)"	4:20

==== Vol. 2: A Tribute to Venom ====
No.	Title	Length
1.	"Warhead (Venom)"	4:40
2.	"In League with Satan (Venom)"	3:31

==== Vol. 3: A Tribute to the Kinks ====
No.	Title	Length
1.	"Attitude (The Kinks)"	3:32
2.	"Victoria (The Kinks)"

==== Vol. 4: A Tribute to Pop-O-Pies and Tales of Terror ====
No.	Title	Length
1.	"Timothy Leary Lives (Pop-O-Pies)"	2:03
2.	"Romance (Tales of Terror)"	2:57

==== Vol. 5: A Tribute to Roxy Music ====
No.	Title	Length
1.	"In Every Dream Home a Heartache (Roxy Music)"

==== Vol. 6: A Tribute to David Bowie ====
No.	Title	Length
1.	"Station to Station (David Bowie)"
2.	"Breaking Glass (David Bowie)"

==== Vol. 7: A Tribute to Queen ====
No.	Title	Length
1.	"You're My Best Friend (Queen)"	2:31
2.	"Now I'm Here (Queen)"

==== Vol. 8: A Tribute to The Jam ====
No.	Title	Length
1.	"Art School (The Jam)"	3:15
2.	"Modern World (The Jam)"
3.	"Batman (Neal Hefti)"

==== Vol. 9: A Tribute to Throbbing Gristle ====
No.	Title	Length
1.	"Heathen Earth"	4:03
2.	"Subhuman"
3.	"Hamburger Lady"

== Personnel ==
- Buzz Osborne – guitar (1–6 & 8–12), bass (1, 4 & 5), vocals (3, 6–8 & 11), backing vocals (1, 2, 10 & 12), stylophone (5 & 10), all instruments (13)
- Dale Crover – drums (1–12), backing vocals (1–3, 6, 8 & 9)

with

- Jared Warren – bass (2, 3, 6 & 8), backing vocals (2, 3 & 8)
- Coady Willis – drums (2, 3, 6 & 8), backing vocals (3 & 8)

=== Special Guest Stars ===
- Scott Kelly – guitar & vocals (1)
- Caleb Benjamin – vocals (2)
- Mark Arm – vocals (4)
- J.G. Thirlwell – vocals & vocal engineer (5)
- Clem Burke – drums (6)
- Trevor Dunn – double bass (7, 9 & 11), vocals (9)
- Jello Biafra – vocals (10)
- Kevin Rutmanis – bass (10)
- Tom Hazelmyer – guitar & vocals (12)

=== Additional personnel ===
- Toshi Kasai – engineer, keyboards (2 & 5)
- John Golden – mastering
- Mackie Osborne – artwork
