= R.I.P. (Murder City Devils album) =

Live album by Murder City Devils
- Released: 2003
- Recorded: October 31, 2001
- Venue: The Showbox
- Genre: Punk rock
- Label: Sub Pop

Murder City Devils chronology
Thelema (2001)	R.I.P. (2003)	The White Ghost Has Blood on Its Hands Again (2014)

Professional ratings
Review scores
Source	Rating
AllMusic	3/5 stars
Pitchfork Media	3.0/10
Punknews.org	5/5 stars

R.I.P. is a live album by the punk rock band Murder City Devils, their last release before their 2006 reunion. It was recorded on October 31, 2001 by Phil Ek at The Showbox in their home town of Seattle, and released in 2003 on Sub Pop.

== Critical reception ==
Trouser Press called the album "as fierce as ever, a drunken sloppy mess of the sort to remind jaded fuckers of the awesome power of rock and roll." Exclaim! deemed it "an emotionally charged 62 minutes of music."

== Track listing ==
1. Bear Away
2. I Drink The Wine
3. One Vision Of May
4. Midnight Service At The Mütter Museum
5. I Want A Lot Now (So Come On)
6. Rum To Whiskey
7. Dancin' Shoes
8. Waltz
9. Dear Hearts
10. That's What You Get
11. Idle Hands
12. Boom Swagger
13. Dance Hall Music
14. Cradle To The Grave
15. Murder City Riot
16. Press Gang
17. Broken Glass
18. 18 Wheels
19. Grace That Saves
