= Basses Loaded =

Studio album by Melvins
- Released: June 3, 2016
- Recorded: Sound of Sirens Studio
- Genres: Sludge metal, stoner rock
- Length: 45:49
- Label: Ipecac
- Producers: Melvins, Toshi Kasai

Melvins chronology
| Three Men and a Baby (2016) | Basses Loaded (2016) | A Walk with Love & Death (2017) |

Singles from Basses Loaded
- 1. "War Pussy" / "Hideous Women" Released: March 10, 2016

Professional ratings
Aggregate scores
| Source | Rating |
|---|---|
| Metacritic | 71/100 |
Review scores
| Source | Rating |
| AllMusic | 3/5 stars |
| Consequence of Sound | B− |
| Pitchfork | (5.5/10) |
| PopMatters | 7/10 stars |

Basses Loaded is the 21st album by American rock band Melvins, released on June 3, 2016, through Ipecac Recordings. It features multiple bass guitar players, mainly those who had performed with the band over the past decade. Steven Shane McDonald of Redd Kross makes his debut with the Melvins, while Nirvana co-founder Krist Novoselic makes a guest appearance.

Nine songs from the album were previously released through Amphetamine Reptile Records on two limited edition EPs (Beer Hippy and War Pussy) and in a split-release with Le Butcherettes (Chaos as Usual). A version of the song "Choco Plumbing" appeared on the Cartoon Network program Uncle Grandpa in the episode "Uncle Melvins".

== Track listing ==
| No. | Title | Writer | Length |
|---|---|---|---|
| 1. | "The Decay of Lying" | | 6:35 |
| 2. | "Choco Plumbing" | | 4:11 |
| 3. | "Beer Hippie" | | 5:15 |
| 4. | "I Want to Tell You" | Harrison | 3:13 |
| 5. | "Captain Come Down" | | 2:54 |
| 6. | "Hideous Women" | | 3:04 |
| 7. | "Shaving Cream" | Traditional / Bell | 2:31 |
| 8. | "Planet Destructo" | | 6:05 |
| 9. | "War Pussy" | | 2:47 |
| 10. | "Maybe I Am Amused" | | 2:45 |
| 11. | "Phyllis Dillard" | | 4:21 |
| 12. | "Take Me Out to the Ball Game" | Traditional /: Norworth; Tilzer | 2:07 |

== Personnel ==
- King Buzzo – guitar & vocals
- Dale Crover – drums & vocals (1, 2, 4–6, 8–10), bass (3, 7, 11, 12)
- Steven McDonald – bass & vocals (1, 4, 6, 9)
- Jared Warren – bass & vocals (2)
- Coady Willis – drums & vocals (2)
- Mike Dillard – drums & vocals (3, 7, 11, 12)
- Jeff Pinkus – bass (5)
- Trevor Dunn – bass (8)
- Krist Novoselic – bass & accordion (10)

with

- Kristy Joy – backing vocals

Production

- Toshi Kasai – engineer, producer
- Mackie Osborne – art
