= Elephantitus of the Night =

Compilation album by godheadSilo
- Released: February 10, 1995
- Recorded: 1992–December 1994
- Studio: Smegmatone Studio, Portland, OR
- Genre: Noise rock, sludge metal
- Length: 6:28 (7-inch), 31:07 (CD)
- Label: Kill Rock Stars

GodheadSilo chronology
The Scientific Supercake L.P. (1994)	Elephantitus of the Night (1995)	Booby Trap (1996)

Professional ratings
Review scores
Source	Rating
Allmusic	3/5 stars

Elephantitus of the Night is a single (on 7-inch vinyl) and EP compiling additional tracks (on CD) by godheadSilo, released on February 10, 1995 by Kill Rock Stars.

== Track listing ==
All tracks are written by godheadSilo.

7-inch single
No.	Title	Recorded	Length
1.	"Elephantitus of the Night"	December 1994	3:24
2.	"Multiple Organic"	December 1994	3:04

CD EP
No.	Title	Recorded	Length
3.	"Rad 180"	December 1994	3:05
4.	"Dan vs. Nature"	December 1994	5:45
5.	"Friendship Village" (from Thee Friendship Village E.P.)	April 1993	4:13
6.	"Master of Balance" (from Thee Friendship Village E.P.)	April 1993	2:44
7.	"You Must Pay" (from Thee Friendship Village E.P.)	April 1993	3:47
8.	"Precipice of Ice" (from Thee Friendship Village E.P.)	April 1993	2:38
9.	"Nutritious Treat" (from Stars Kill Rock compilation)	Summer of 1992	2:27

== Personnel ==
godheadSilo

- Dan Haugh – drums
- Mike Kunka – bass guitar

Technical personnel

- godheadSilo – mixing
- Tim Green – recording, mixing
- Michael Lastra – recording
- Owen Murphy – recording (8)
- Joe Preston – recording (5–8)

== Release history ==
Region	Date	Label	Format	Catalog
United States	1995	Kill Rock Stars	CD, single	KRS 242
