= Thee Friendship Village E.P. =

EP by godheadSilo
- Released: July 7, 1993
- Recorded: April 1993
- Studio: Smegmatone Studio, Portland, OR
- Genre: Noise rock
- Length: 13:27
- Label: Kill Rock Stars

GodheadSilo chronology
Thee Friendship Village E.P. (1993)	The Scientific Supercake L.P. (1994)

Thee Friendship Village E.P. is an EP by godheadSilo, released on July 7, 1993 by Kill Rock Stars. In 1995, the record was released in its entirety on CD the version of Elephantitus of the Night.

== Track listing ==
All tracks are written by godheadSilo.

Side one
No.	Title	Length
1.	"Friendship Village"	4:12
2.	"Master of Balance"	2:45

Side two
No.	Title	Length
1.	"You Must Pay"	3:45
2.	"Precipice of Ice"	2:45

== Personnel ==
godheadSilo

- Dan Haugh – drums
- Mike Kunka – bass guitar

Technical personnel

- godheadSilo – mixing
- Tim Green – recording
- Michael Lastra – recording
- Joe Preston – recording

== Release history ==
Region	Date	Label	Format	Catalog
United States	1993	Kill Rock Stars	EP	KRS 211
