= Ocean Breathes Salty =

Single by Modest Mouse

from the album Good News for People Who Love Bad News
- Released: August 23, 2004
- Length: 3:49
- Label: Epic
- Songwriters: Isaac Brock; Dann Gallucci; Eric Judy; Benjamin Weikel
- Producer: Dennis Herring

Modest Mouse singles chronology
"Float On" (2004)	"Ocean Breathes Salty" (2004)	"The World at Large" (2005)

"Ocean Breathes Salty" is a song by American rock band Modest Mouse, released on August 23, 2004 as the second single from their fourth studio album Good News for People Who Love Bad News.

== Cover art ==
On the front cover of both releases of the single, one of the band's icons (an upside down hot air balloon with an anchor) can be seen.

== Music video ==
The music video for "Ocean Breathes Salty" was directed by Chris Milk. The video shows a young boy finding a bird with a broken wing, which throughout the video becomes lead singer Isaac Brock. The boy patches up the bird and shows it to his mother, who is disgusted. She tries to take the bird away, and then the boy runs away and spends the night in a field with the bird where he dreams that he can play with it when it heals. When he wakes up, he finds that the bird has died, and he buries it. As he walks away, the band, all dressed up as animals, appear and finish the song, then disappear.

== Track listing ==
CD
No.	Title	Length
1.	"Ocean Breathes Salty"	3:47
2.	"Float On" (Live Studio)	3:38

Enhanced CD
No.	Title	Length
1.	"Ocean Breathes Salty"	3:47
2.	"Float On" (Live Studio)	3:38
3.	"Ocean Breathes Salty" (Live Studio)	3:52
4.	"Ocean Breathes Salty" (Video)	3:47

== Personnel ==
- Isaac Brock – vocals, guitar
- Eric Judy – bass guitar
- Dann Gallucci – guitar, keyboards
- Benjamin Weikel – drums

== Charts ==
=== Weekly charts ===
Weekly chart performance for "Ocean Breathes Salty"
Chart (2004)	Peak position
UK Singles (OCC)	96
US Alternative Airplay (Billboard)	6

=== Year-end charts ===
2004 year-end chart performance for "Ocean Breathes Salty"
Chart (2004)	Position
US Modern Rock Tracks (Billboard)	66

2005 year-end chart performance for "Ocean Breathes Salty"
Chart (2005)	Position
US Modern Rock Tracks (Billboard)	51

== Certifications ==
Certifications for "Ocean Breathes Salty"
Region	Certification	Certified units/sales
United States (RIAA)	Gold	500,000^{*}
^{*} Sales figures based on certification alone.
