= Goin' Blind =

1974 song performed by Kiss

Song by Kiss

from the album Hotter Than Hell
- Released: October 22, 1974
- Recorded: August 1974
- Genre: Hard rock
- Length: 3:37
- Label: Casablanca
- Songwriters: Gene Simmons, Stephen Coronel
- Producers: Kenny Kerner and Richie Wise

"Goin' Blind" is a ballad by American hard rock band Kiss, written by Gene Simmons and Stephen Coronel; it is sometimes referred to as "Going Blind". The song originally appeared on the band's second album, 1974's Hotter Than Hell. The original working title for the song was "Little Lady".

Sung by Simmons, "Goin' Blind" is the band's first ballad. The lyrics are about a 93-year-old man's agonized attempt to communicate with a 16-year-old girl. The song's original second verse lyric ("Little lady from the land beneath the sea"), revived by Simmons for their MTV Unplugged performance, suggests that the song's narrator is a dying sea captain who is addressing a mermaid.

== Live performances ==
It was rarely performed live by Kiss until it appeared in acoustic form on the Kiss Unplugged MTV performance, and was released on the subsequent live album from the show. It next appeared on Kiss Symphony: Alive IV, again in acoustic form, although this time the song was performed with the Melbourne Symphony Ensemble.

In December 2005, the band released Rock the Nation, a double-DVD documentary of the 2004 tour. It included, as a bonus track, the first commercially released live electric version of "Goin' Blind".

== Reception ==
AllMusic wrote: "This surprisingly moody slab of heavy rock provided Hotter Than Hell with one of its most enduring high points."

== Cover versions ==
Melvins recorded the song in 1993 for their Houdini album and again in 2005 for their A Live History of Gluttony and Lust live album. Dinosaur Jr recorded the song in 1994 for the Kiss My Ass: Classic Kiss Regrooved tribute album. The Melvins version was also submitted for the album, but Gene Simmons chose the Dinosaur Jr version. However, Simmons expressed his admiration for Melvins and once joined them onstage to perform the song live.

An acoustic version of the song was released by Dramarama on their 1996 greatest hits album Best of Dramarama: 18 Big Ones.

Eric Singer Project, led by Kiss drummer Eric Singer and also featuring former Kiss guitarist Bruce Kulick, recorded a version on their 1998 all-covers debut album Lost and Spaced

A neo-baroque version appeared on the String Quartet Tribute to Kiss album.

Kiss Night in Las Vegas recorded a version in December 2019.

Former Hades and Non-Fiction and current Vessel of Light and Cassius King guitarist Dan Lorenzo recorded a version on his 2004 solo album, Nice Being Alone.

== Parodies ==
Canadian progressive rock band Rush, who had opened for Kiss during both bands' early years, poked fun at this song with "I Think I'm Going Bald", from their 1975 album Caress of Steel. In the book Contents Under Pressure, Rush frontman Geddy Lee explained: "We were touring a lot with Kiss in those days and they had a song called 'I Think I'm Going Blind.' So we were kind of taking the piss out of that title by just coming up with this." Lee noted that the title originated with Rush drummer Neil Peart, who was making light of the fact that guitarist Alex Lifeson was constantly worried about the future possibility of going bald, often employing "all kinds of ingredients to put on his scalp. And I think it just got Neil thinking about aging..."

== Personnel ==
- Gene Simmons – lead vocals, bass
- Paul Stanley – rhythm guitar, backing vocals
- Peter Criss – drums
- Ace Frehley – lead guitar
