= (A) Senile Animal =

- Digital cover

Studio album by Melvins
- Released: October 10, 2006
- Recorded: July 1–14, 2006
- Studios: West Beach Recorders, Hollywood
- Genres: Sludge metal; stoner metal
- Length: 41:24
- Label: Ipecac
- Producer: Melvins

Melvins chronology
A Live History of Gluttony and Lust (2006)	(A) Senile Animal (2006)	Nude with Boots (2008)

(A) Senile Animal is the fifteenth album by the American rock band Melvins, released on October 10, 2006 on Ipecac Recordings. After bassist Kevin Rutmanis' departure the two remaining members of the Melvins joined forces with Big Business, a duo consisting of Jared Warren on bass and Coady Willis on drums.

== Background ==
On the line-up change, frontman Buzz Osborne spoke to Kerrang! in 2008, stating:

When it became obvious we wouldn't be working with Kevin again, me and Dale were very discouraged fellows – I was bummed out for 18 months! We didn't know what we were going to do, but we knew we were going to do something. We'd played with Big Business and Jared [Warren]'s name had been batted around when we were thinking of bass players but I thought instead of just getting him, why don't we just get both those guys? We thought about two drummers a long time ago and messed around a little bit but [getting Coady Willis, Big Business' drummer] was the best decision we could have made. I'm not afraid of making changes and everything's worked out perfectly for everybody including Kevin. This record is one of my favourites and I think we're just scratching the surface of what we can do with these guys.

A music video for "The Talking Horse" was made and shown in 2007.

== Musical style ==
(A) Senile Animal features Melvins' signature sludge and stoner metal sound. AllMusic critic Greg Prato noted: "Although they started out primarily as a punk band that slowed down the riffs, the Melvins have also always mixed in prog rock-like bits, such as the tricky rhythms of 'Blood Witch' and the King Crimson/Tool-ish 'The Hawk.' The album also contains some of the group's most straightforward compositions in some time, including the metallic/new wave-ish ditty 'A History of Drunks.'"

== Critical reception ==
Professional ratings
Review scores
Source	Rating
AllMusic	3.5/5 stars
Drowned in Sound	8/10
The Encyclopedia of Popular Music	3/5 stars
Music Story	3.5/5 stars
Pitchfork	7.3/10
PopMatters	8/10 stars
Punknews.org	4/5 stars
Stylus Magazine	B−

AllMusic's Greg Prato wrote: "The transfusion of new blood has made one of rock's gnarliest beats even -- gnarlier!". Drowned in Sound's Grant Purdum stated: "In lieu of live albums and collaborations aplenty, A Senile Animal couldn't have snarled to life at a better time."

== Track listing ==
No.	Title	Length
1.	"The Talking Horse"	2:41
2.	"Blood Witch"	2:45
3.	"Civilized Worm"	5:57
4.	"A History of Drunks"	2:20
5.	"Rat Faced Granny"	2:41
6.	"The Hawk"	2:35
7.	"You've Never Been Right"	2:30
8.	"A History of Bad Men"	6:43
9.	"The Mechanical Bride"	6:26
10.	"A Vast Filthy Prison"	6:44
Total length:		41:24

== Vinyl edition ==
The vinyl edition was released as a 4-LP box set from Hydra Head Records. Each LP featured music on one side and an etching on the other. This was limited to 300 copies in a variety of colors and designs.

== Personnel ==
- Coady Willis – drums, vocals
- Dale Crover – drums, vocals
- Jared Warren – bass guitar, vocals
- King Buzzo – guitar, vocals

=== Additional personnel ===
- Toshi Kasai – engineer, mixing
- John Golden – mastering
- Mackie Osborne – art
- Kevin Willis – band photos

== Charts ==
2021 chart performance for (A) Senile Animal
Chart (2021)	Peak position
UK Rock & Metal Albums (Official Charts)	25
