= Here Come the Waterworks =

Studio album by Big Business
- Released: March 6, 2007
- Genre: Heavy metal, sludge metal, stoner rock
- Length: 40:43
- Label: Hydra Head Records (HH666-121)
- Producer: Phil Ek

Big Business chronology
| Head for the Shallow (2005) | Here Come the Waterworks (2007) | Mind the Drift (2009) |

Professional ratings
Review scores
| Source | Rating |
|---|---|
| allmusic | 3.5/5 stars |
| Jam! | 3.5/5 stars |
| Punknews.org | 4/5 stars |
| Pitchfork Media | (7.9/10) |
| Tiny Mix Tapes | 2/5 stars |

Here Come the Waterworks is the second album by heavy metal band Big Business. It was released by Hydra Head Records on March 6, 2007, to critical acclaim.

== Track listing ==
| No. | Title | Length |
|---|---|---|
| 1. | "Just as the Day Was Dawning" | 4:13 |
| 2. | "Hands Up" | 2:59 |
| 3. | "Shields" | 3:07 |
| 4. | "Grounds for Divorce" | 5:30 |
| 5. | "Another Fourth of July… Ruined" | 4:30 |
| 6. | "Start Your Digging" | 4:05 |
| 7. | "I’ll Give You Something to Cry About" | 9:09 |
| 8. | "Another Beautiful Day in the Pacific Northwest" | 7:10 |

== Personnel ==
Band members

- Jared Warren - Bassist, Vocalist
- Coady Willis - Drums
- David Scott Stone - Guitars, Voyager

Other personnel

- Recorded, Mixed, and Produced by Phil Ek at AVAST! and AVAST II, Seattle, WA
- Assistant Engineer - Cameron Nicklaus
- Mastered by JJ Golden at Golden Mastering
- Art Direction and Production by Kevin Willis and Jake Manny
- Photography by Robin Laananen
