= Skyward in Triumph =

Studio album by godheadSilo
- Released: April 9, 1996
- Recorded: December 1995
- Studio: Smegmatone, Portland
- Genre: Noise rock
- Length: 36:40
- Label: Sub Pop

GodheadSilo chronology
Booby Trap (1996)	Skyward in Triumph (1996)	Share the Fantasy (1998)

Professional ratings
Review scores
Source	Rating
AllMusic	4/5 stars
Pitchfork Media	7.6/10

Skyward in Triumph is the second studio album by godheadSilo, released on April 9, 1996, by Sub Pop.

== Track listing ==
All tracks are written by godheadSilo.

No.	Title	Length
1.	"Echo Challenge"	2:31
2.	"Booby Trap"	3:36
3.	"Chuckanut Overdrive"	3:07
4.	"Just Friends"	1:56
5.	"Guardians of the Threshold"	15:20
6.	"Dan vs. Time"	0:18
7.	"Buttress of Solitude"	2:16
8.	"French Loan"	4:45
9.	"Skyward In Triumph"	2:51

== Personnel ==
Adapted from the Skyward in Triumph liner notes.

godheadSilo

- Dan Haugh – drums
- Mike Kunka – bass guitar

Production

- godheadSilo – recording, mixing
- Tim Green – recording
- Michael Lastra – recording, mixing
- Joe Preston – recording, mixing

== Release history ==
Region	Date	Label	Format	Catalog
United States	1996	Sub Pop	CD, LP	SP 347
