= Booby Trap (godheadSilo EP) =

1996 EP by godheadSilo

EP by godheadSilo
- Released: March 12, 1996
- Recorded: December 1995
- Studios: Smegmatone Studio, Portland, OR
- Genres: Noise rock, stoner rock
- Length: 9:30
- Label: Sub Pop

GodheadSilo chronology
Elephantitus of the Night (1995)	Booby Trap (1996)	Skyward in Triumph (1996)

Booby Trap is an EP by godheadSilo, released on March 12, 1996 by Sub Pop prior to the release of Skyward in Triumph, on which the song "Booby Trap" also appears.

== Track listing ==
All tracks are written by godheadSilo, except "Gypsy" by Mick Box and David Byron.

Side one
No.	Title	Length
1.	"Booby Trap"	3:30
2.	"Turn Up the Vocals"	1:55

Side two
No.	Title	Length
1.	"Gypsy" (Uriah Heep cover)	3:00
2.	"Sprechen Sie Nuts"	2:05

== Personnel ==
godheadSilo

- Dan Haugh – drums
- Mike Kunka – bass guitar

Technical personnel

- godheadSilo – mixing
- Tim Green – recording, backing vocals (B1)
- Michael Lastra – recording, mixing
- Joe Preston – recording, backing vocals (B1)

== Release history ==
Region	Date	Label	Format	Catalog
United States	1996	Sub Pop	EP	SP 344
