= White Shit =

American punk rock band

- Origin: United States
- Genres: Punk rock
- Years active: 2009–present
- Label: Post Present Medium
- Members: Jared Warren; Coady Willis; Andy Coronado

White Shit is an American punk rock band, most significant for their 2009 song "Jim Morrison". They released their debut album, Sculpted Beef, in 2009.

== Discography ==
- Sculpted Beef (2009)
- Carry Me (2010)
- White Shi'ite (2010)
