= Mangled Demos from 1983 =

Compilation album by The Melvins
- Released: May 31, 2005
- Recorded: 1983
- Genre: Hardcore punk
- Length: 43:38
- Label: Ipecac Recordings (CD); Alternative Tentacles (LP)
- Producer: The Melvins

The Melvins chronology
Never Breathe What You Can't See (2004)	Mangled Demos from 1983 (2005)	Sieg Howdy! (2005)

Professional ratings
Review scores
Source	Rating
Allmusic	3.5/5 stars
Pitchfork Media	5.3/10

Mangled Demos from 1983 is a collection of various recordings from the earliest incarnation of American rock group Melvins first recorded in 1983, then remastered and released on Ipecac Records in 2005.

Until 2005, none of the material had ever been officially released, with the exception of the first version of "Forgotten Principles". A few tracks included in this album have previously appeared on bootleg releases. It is the only record featuring the original lineup (guitarist/vocalist Buzz Osborne, bassist Matt Lukin, drummer Mike Dillard). Tracks 3–13 were recorded by Michael Diamond at Sound Art Studio by Mud Bay, a suburb of Olympia, Washington, for possible album release. Ultimately the album was not released at the time, as no record label was interested in the Melvins until 1985.

Despite the album's title, Allmusic described the sound quality as "surprisingly good."

== Track listing ==
Some song titles were lost over time, they are listed with symbols. Tracks 22 and 23 are silent.

1. "Elks Lodge Christmas Broadcast" – 3:52
2. "If You Get Bored (Live Radio)" – 2:22
3. "Forgotten Principles" – 1:07
4. "Snake Appeal" – 1:59
5. "Master Charge" – 1:08
6. "If You Get Bored" – 1:33
7. "Set Me Straight" – 2:31
8. "✪" (Circled white star U+272A) – 1:02
9. "I'm Dry" – 1:35
10. "Forgotten Principles" (alternate edit) – 1:19
11. "I Don't Know" – 1:35
12. "Matt-Alec" – 3:00
13. "The Real You" – 1:27
14. "Run Around" – 1:44
15. "Keep Away From Me" – 1:22
16. "☘" (Shamrock U+2618)– 1:00
17. "Bibulous Confabulation During Rehearsal" – 4:58
18. "✠" (Maltese Cross U+2720) – 1:21
19. "✏" (Pencil U+270F) – 1:10
20. "Matt-Alec" – 3:14
21. "Walter" – 3:21
22. "✁" (Upper blade scissors U+2701) – 0:24
23. "✈" (Airplane U+2708) – 0:22

== Vinyl version ==
The vinyl version of Mangled Demos From 1983 was released on Alternative Tentacles as a double 10" record. Notably, it features a small booklet hidden amongst the vinyl with liner notes by Buzz Osborne detailing life in Washington around 1983 with almost no details on the actual record or recording itself, done in a similar fashion to the liner notes in 26 Songs and Gluey Porch Treatments. The last two tracks (both of which being short silent tracks) are omitted from the vinyl release.

== Personnel ==
- Buzz Osborne - vocals, guitar
- Matt Lukin - bass
- Mike Dillard - drums
- Mackie Osborne - design
