= The White Ghost Has Blood on Its Hands Again =

Studio album by Murder City Devils
- Released: August 5, 2014
- Genre: Punk rock
- Label: self-released

Murder City Devils chronology
R.I.P. (2003)	The White Ghost Has Blood on Its Hands Again (2014)

Professional ratings
Review scores
Source	Rating
Punknews.org	3.5/5 stars

The White Ghost Has Blood on Its Hands Again is the fourth studio album by punk rock band Murder City Devils. It was their first release after their 2006 reunion.

It was self-released by the band on August 5, 2014, and is available on LP only.

== Track listing ==
1. I Don't Wanna Work for Scum Anymore - 1:46
2. Cruelty Abounds - 2:52
3. Pale Disguise - 3:54
4. Old Flame - 4:13
5. Hey Playboy - 3:06
6. Not Everybody Gets a Good Time - 2:18
7. Non-Participation - 3:24
8. Don't Worry - 3:30
