= Three Men and a Baby (album) =

Studio album by Mike & the Melvins
- Released: April 1, 2016
- Recorded: 1999 at Louder Studios in San Francisco, CA; February 2015 at Sound of Sirens in Los Angeles, CA
- Genres: Sludge metal, noise rock, powerviolence
- Length: 36:55
- Label: Sub Pop

Melvins chronology
Hold It In (2014)	Three Men and a Baby (2016)	Basses Loaded (2016)

Professional ratings
Aggregate scores
Source	Rating
Metacritic	(70/100)
Review scores
Source	Rating
AllMusic	3.5/5 stars
Pitchfork Media	(7.0/10)
PopMatters	(7/10)

Three Men and a Baby is a collaborative studio album by Mike Kunka and American rock band Melvins, released on April 1, 2016 through Sub Pop. The album was mostly recorded in 1999 by Tim Green, but further production was delayed for over a decade. It was finished in 2015 with longtime Melvins associate Toshi Kasai engineering and mixing.

== Track listing ==
All songs written by Mike Kunka and the Melvins except where noted.

No.	Title	Writer	Length
1.	"Chicken 'n' Dump"		3:35
2.	"Limited Teeth"		3:48
3.	"Bummer Conversation"		3:33
4.	"Annalisa"	Lydon / Public Image Ltd	3:47
5.	"A Dead Pile of Worthless Junk"		2:51
6.	"Read the Label (It's Chili)"		4:40
7.	"Dead Canaries"		2:37
8.	"Pound the Giants"		3:23
9.	"A Friend in Need Is a Friend You Don't Need"		2:25
10.	"Lifestyle Hammer"		1:47
11.	"Gravel"		2:09
12.	"Art School Fight Song"		2:11

== Personnel ==
- Dale Crover – drums, vocals; photos
- Buzz Osborne – guitar, bass, vocals; photos
- Kevin Rutmanis – bass, vocals
- Mike Kunka – bass, vocals

Production

- Tim Green – engineer
- Toshi Kasai – engineer, mixing
- John Golden – mastering
- Mackie Osborne – art
