= Karp (band) =

American post-hardcore band

- Origin: Tumwater, Washington, U.S.
- Genres: Post-hardcore
- Years active: 1990–1998
- Labels: K, Kill Rock Stars
- Members: Chris Smith; Jared Warren; Scott Jernigan

Karp was an American noise rock band from Tumwater, Washington, that formed in 1990, while the members were classmates at Tumwater High School in Tumwater, WA, and lasted until 1998. The band was formed by Chris Smith a.k.a. Chris "Slayer", Jared Warren and Scott Jernigan. They released three full-length albums titled Mustaches Wild, Suplex, and Self Titled LP, in addition to a compilation album of rare cuts entitled Action Chemistry named after a chemistry course in high school. They also released several EPs and 7-inch records.

Karp mixed elements of hardcore punk and metal à la the Melvins with an ear for pop-influenced song assembly. The band name is inspired from a newsletter/zine that Smith put out in high school and is an acronym that stands for "Kill All Redneck Pricks". Their oft used logo of an eagle with spread wings was a modification on the defunct National Recovery Administration's "Blue Eagle" logo. Their recordings were released by several Northwest-related labels such as K Records, Kill Rock Stars, and Punk in My Vitamins. Chris Smith was great friends with another Olympia punk rock legend, Mikey Dees, of the band Fitz of Depression.

Members went on to play with Tight Bro's from Way Back When, The Whip, Dead Air Fresheners, Big Business and the Melvins. Drummer Scott Jernigan died in a boating accident on Lake Washington on June 10, 2003.

New York–based documentarian Bill Badgley (of the rock band Federation X), released a documentary on the band, entitled Kill All Redneck Pricks, a preview of which was shown in Seattle October 22, 2009. The documentary film is a career spanning look at the formation of the band through the trials of touring to their ultimate break-up.

== Discography ==
=== Albums ===
- Mustaches Wild 10-inch/LP/CD, K Records (1994)
- Suplex CD/LP, K Records (1995)
- Self Titled LP CD/LP, K Records (1997)
- Action Chemistry CD (singles compilation), Punk in My Vitamins (2001)

=== 7" singles and EPs ===
- I'd Rather Be Clogging 7-inch Punk in My Vitamins
- I'm Done 7-inch Punk in My Vitamins
- Freighty Cat EP 7-inch Atlas
- We Ate Sand 7-inch, K Records (1996)
- Prison Shake 7-inch, Up Records

=== Compilation appearances and splits ===
- Karp / Rye Coalition split CD/12", Troubleman Unlimited
- Bostonot compilation: "Let Me Take You Home Tonight" – Face the Music Records FTM-4
- Jabberjaw: Good to the Last Drop 7-inch Mammoth
- Karp/Long Hind Legs split 7-inch, Karate Brand
- Stars Kill Rock CD/LP, Kill Rock Stars
- Julep compilation CD/LP, Yoyo Recordings, 1993
