= The Scientific Supercake L.P. =

Studio album by godheadSilo
- Released: 1994
- Recorded: February 1994
- Studios: Smegmatone, Portland, OR
- Genre: Noise rock
- Length: 40:09
- Label: Kill Rock Stars

GodheadSilo chronology
Thee Friendship Village E.P. (1993)	The Scientific Supercake L.P. (1994)	Elephantitus of the Night (1995)

The Scientific Supercake L.P. is the debut album of godheadSilo. It was released in 1994 by Kill Rock Stars.

== Critical reception ==
Professional ratings
Review scores
Source	Rating
AllMusic	3/5 stars
Fort Worth Star-Telegram	4.5/5 stars

The Fort Worth Star-Telegram wrote that the duo "hammer out distorto-infuriated grooves with all the power and precision of a typical four-piece, stringing together their clamor with discordant screams, television samples and, of course, lots of feedback."

Andrew Earles, in Gimme Indie Rock: 500 Essential American Underground Rock Albums 1981-1996, wrote that the album "literally held the potential to destroy speakers and stereo systems not ready for the absurdly low and nasty frequencies found in some of [the] songs."

== Track listing ==
All music is composed by godheadSilo.

No.	Title	Length
1.	"Nuts to You"	3:27
2.	"Ventrilloqueef"	0:20
3.	"Birthday Sandwich"	5:12
4.	"Another Schizoid Ambelism"	2:43
5.	"Rainbow Connection"	0:59
6.	"Mr. Push Up"	6:42
7.	"I Luv U...nicorns"	3:16
8.	"Two Peanuts Are Walking Down the Street"	1:06
9.	"Hopefully They Will Learn"	1:54
10.	"Bereft Rescue Mission No. 43"	2:58
11.	"Battle of the Planets"	11:33

== Personnel ==
godheadSilo

- Dan Haugh – drums
- Mike Kunka – bass guitar

Technical

- godheadSilo – mixing
- Tim Green – recording, mixing
- Michael Lastra – recording
- Joe Preston – recording

== Release history ==
Region	Date	Label	Format	Catalog
United States	1994	Kill Rock Stars	CD, LP	KRS 226
