= Mind the Drift =

Studio album by Big Business
- Released: April 14, 2009
- Recorded: 2008, at Avast II, Seattle, WA; Mad Dog Studios, Burbank, CA and D.C. Studios, Hollywood, CA
- Genre: Heavy metal
- Length: 35:10
- Labels: Hydra Head Records (HH666-175)

Big Business chronology
Here Come the Waterworks (2007)	Mind the Drift (2009)	Biz Bot Remixes 12" (2009)

Professional ratings
Review scores
Source	Rating
Decibel	(8/10)
Pitchfork Media	(7.1/10)
Rock Sound	8/10 stars
Sputnikmusic	2/5 stars
The A.V. Club	(B)

Mind the Drift is the third studio album by American heavy metal band Big Business.

== Track listing ==
1. "Found Art" - 3:34
2. "Gold and Final" - 3:32
3. "Cats, Mice." - 3:52
4. "I Got It Online" - 3:59
5. "The Drift" - 3:40
6. "Ayes Have It" - 4:17
7. "Cold Lunch" - 3:33
8. "Theme From Big Business II" - 8:43
9. "Cold Lunch (Demo)" (Bonus Track) - 3:40
10. "The Drift (Demo)" (Bonus Track) - 3:48
11. "Send Me A Postcard" (Bonus Track) - 2:45

== Personnel ==
Big Business

- Jared Warren – bass, lead vocals
- Coady Willis – drums
- Toshi Kasai – guitar, backing vocals, keyboards

Technical personnel

- Phil Elk and Big Business – recording
- Cameron Nicklaus – second engineer
- Sadaharu Yagi – second engineer
- JJ Golden – mastering
- James O'Mara – layout and execution
