= Leslie Hardy (musician) =

American musician

- Genres: Punk, grunge
- Occupation: Musician
- Instruments: Keyboard, bass
- Years active: 1992-c. 2014

Leslie Hardy is an American musician who has played for a number of Seattle-based bands, but principally as organist for Murder City Devils. She was bassist/backup singer for Hole in late 1992.

== History ==
Leslie Hardy grew up in Metro Detroit, Michigan.

She was Hole's bassist and backup singer for several months in 1992 to 1993. According to Rene Navarrette (a live-in friend of Hole frontwoman Courtney Love), the band moved her up from Los Angeles to Seattle, but her playing did not meet required standards. Hardy's picture appears on the EP version of the single "Beautiful Son", but she does not appear on any of the tracks, which were recorded after her departure.

Seattle punk band Kill Sybil also used her as bassist, and when that broke up Hardy and that band's singer/guitarist Dale Balenseifen formed the all-female Juned with singer/guitarist Claudia Groom (of local band My Diva) and drummer Nalini Cheriel (of Adickdid).

Bassist Mike Johnson, then of Dinosaur Jr, was a fan of Juned. He produced and played on their first self-titled album in 1994, and the band opened for Dinosaur Jr at a number of concerts. Hardy married Johnson in 1995, and contributed to two tracks on his 1996 solo record Year of Mondays, but the marriage did not last.

In 1998 she briefly played bass in Love as Laughter, before joining garage-punk band The Murder City Devils as their keyboardist/organist. The band had released its second album Empty Bottles, Broken Hearts and needed a keyboard player for its tour. Hardy became an integral part of MCD, contributing as a songwriter, and with her organ playing a key factor in the band's sound. After two years of pain from carpal tunnel syndrome, she received surgery on both wrists in mid-2001. Continuing pain over the next two months, however, forced her to leave Murder City Devils; its European tour was cancelled and it subsequently broke up for a time.

Hardy left Seattle and returned home to Detroit, where she has worked as a real estate agent and played in local band Pigeon. She joined Matt Skiba and the Sekrets as keyboardist for their 2012 tour; Skiba (of Alkaline Trio) did not know her previously, but invited her to play because he was a "huge Murder City Devils fan".

After her return to Detroit, Hardy played at a number of Murder City Devils reunion concerts, and appears on one track of their 2014 album The White Ghost Has Blood on Its Hands Again. The lack of Hardy's organ sound was described as "the most disappointing aspect" of that album by The A.V. Club.

Hardy currently works as a realtor in Michigan.
