= Share the Fantasy =

Studio album by godheadSilo
- Released: January 20, 1998
- Studio: Avast!, Seattle, WA
- Genre: Noise rock, sludge metal
- Length: 48:08
- Label: Sub Pop

GodheadSilo chronology
Skyward in Triumph (1996)	Share the Fantasy (1998)

Professional ratings
Review scores
Source	Rating
AllMusic	2.5/5 stars
Pitchfork Media	6.8/10

Share the Fantasy is the third album by godheadSilo, released on January 20, 1998, by Sub Pop.

== Track listing ==
All tracks are written by godheadSilo, except "In the Air Tonight" by Phil Collins and "Friend Island" by Rotten Gramma.

No.	Title	Length
1.	"Friend Island" (Rotten Gramma cover)	1:31
2.	"Goin' Commando"	3:27
3.	"Bunson Over the Junson"	6:40
4.	"Relationshit"	4:38
5.	"Time to Feed the Pythons"	3:17
6.	"Braincloud"	4:46
7.	"In the Air Tonight" (Phil Collins cover)	5:32
8.	"Nap Attack"	4:19
9.	"Dan Vs. Fellow Dan"	5:23
10.	"Home Crap Home"	1:24
11.	"You're Fighting Me Now"	7:11

== Personnel ==
godheadSilo

- Dan Haugh – drums, photography
- Mike Kunka – bass guitar, photography

Technical

- Alex Newport – recording, engineering, mixing
- Eric Stotik – painting

== Release history ==
Region	Date	Label	Format	Catalog
United States	1998	Sub Pop	CD	SP 416
