= Nude with Boots =

Studio album by Melvins
- Released: July 8, 2008
- Recorded: January 2008
- Genre: Sludge metal
- Length: 42:15
- Label: Ipecac

Melvins chronology
(A) Senile Animal (2006)	Nude with Boots (2008)	Live from London 2006 (2008)

Professional ratings
Aggregate scores
Source	Rating
Metacritic	71/100
Review scores
Source	Rating
AllMusic	3.5/5 stars
Billboard	(favorable)
Crawdaddy!	(favorable)
Now	4/5 stars
Pitchfork Media	(7.0/10)
The Skinny	4/5 stars
Spin	3.5/5 stars

Nude with Boots is the 16th album by American rock band Melvins, released on July 8, 2008. A vinyl release was issued on November 3, 2009.

== Track listing ==
No.	Title	Length
1.	"The Kicking Machine"	2:44
2.	"Billy Fish"	3:53
3.	"Dog Island"	7:32
4.	"Dies Iraea"	4:33
5.	"Suicide in Progress"	4:47
6.	"The Smiling Cobra"	3:43
7.	"Nude with Boots"	3:36
8.	"Flush"	1:07
9.	"The Stupid Creep"	1:31
10.	"The Savage Hippy"	3:34
11.	"It Tastes Better than the Truth"	5:20

- "Dies Iraea" is an adaptation of the theme song from the 1980 Stanley Kubrick horror film The Shining (based on Hector Berlioz' interpretation of the "Dies Irae").

== Personnel ==
- King Buzzo – guitar, vocals
- Dale Crover – drums, vocals
- Jared Warren – bass guitar, vocals
- Coady Willis – drums, vocals

with

- Haze XXL – extra guitar and vocals, engineer

=== Additional personnel ===
- Toshi Kasai – engineer
- John Golden – mastering
- Mackie Osborne – artwork
