= Mike Dillard =

American drummer (born 1965)

- Born: Mike Dillard; 1965 (age 60–61)
- Origin: Montesano, Washington, U.S.
- Genres: Punk rock, alternative rock, heavy metal, experimental rock
- Occupation: Musician
- Instrument: Drums
- Labels: Ipecac, Alternative Tentacles, Amphetamine Reptile
- Formerly of: Melvins; Fecal Matter

Mike Dillard (born 1965) is an American drummer and one of the founding members of rock band Melvins. His only known recordings with the original lineup eventually saw release in 2005 as Mangled Demos from 1983. He left the band in 1984 and was replaced by Dale Crover. In 1986 he briefly played in Kurt Cobain's first band, Fecal Matter, before they disbanded.

Dillard returned to play songs from Mangled Demos live with Buzz Osborne and Dale Crover (on bass) under the name "Melvins 1983" starting in 2008. They collectively played a few shows, including two shows to celebrate Jello Biafra's 50th birthday and an appearance at the ATP "Nightmare Before Christmas" festival later that year. The Melvins 1983 lineup also performed for the first of three sets on the band's 25th Anniversary tour in 2009 and on one of the Endless Residency sets at the Spaceland venue in Los Angeles in 2011.

Dillard also plays drums on Tres Cabrones, making his first recordings with the Melvins in 29 years. The majority of the songs included on the album had been released in a variety of limited edition EPs, singles and compilations, primarily through Amphetamine Reptile Records, starting in 2012 before Tres Cabrones came out one year later.

In September 2015, the Melvins 1983 released the Beer Hippy EP on AmRep. All four tracks from the EP were included on Basses Loaded, released by Ipecac Recordings in June 2016.

Dillard was also in the band Hot Carl and recorded a six-song demo with them in February 2001.

== Discography with the Melvins ==
- 2005 – Mangled Demos from 1983 (archival release)
- 2013 – Tres Cabrones
- 2016 – Basses Loaded (select songs)
- 2021 - Working with God
- 2025 - Thunderball
