= The Murder City Devils (album) =

Studio album by Murder City Devils
- Released: 1997
- Genre: Punk rock
- Label: Die Young Stay Pretty Records
- Producer: Steve Wold

Murder City Devils chronology
The Murder City Devils (1997)	Empty Bottles, Broken Hearts (1998)

Professional ratings
Review scores
Source	Rating
AllMusic	2.5/5 stars

The Murder City Devils is the debut studio album by punk rock band Murder City Devils. It was recorded at Moon Studios, Olympia, and produced by Steve Wold. It was released in 1997 on Die Young Stay Pretty Records.

== Critical reception ==
AllMusic gave the album a mixed review, writing: "A good choice for those interested in the progression of this rock outfit or those who prefer a stripped-down punk production, but not the rock & roll rampage of the later works."

== Track listing ==
1. Dance Hall Music - 1:19
2. It's In My Heart - 1:27
3. Boom Swagger Boom - 2:40
4. Get Off The Floor - 2:18
5. Flashbulb - 2:53
6. Broken Glass - 2:42
7. Murder City Riot - 1:21
8. Sick Of Dreaming - 1:40
9. Make It On My Own - 2:29
10. Tell You Brother - 3:27
