= In Name and Blood =

Studio album by Murder City Devils
- Released: 2000
- Studio: Robert Lang (Shoreline, Washington)
- Genre: Punk rock
- Label: Sub Pop
- Producer: John Agnello

Murder City Devils chronology
Empty Bottles, Broken Hearts (1998)	In Name and Blood (2000)	Thelema (2001)

Professional ratings
Review scores
Source	Rating
AllMusic	4/5 stars
The Independent	3/5 stars
Pitchfork	3.1/10
The Province	3.5/4 stars

In Name and Blood is the third studio album by punk rock band Murder City Devils, released in 2000. It was recorded, produced, and mixed at Robert Lang Studios by John Agnello.

The Fastbacks's Kim Warnick sings backing vocals on "I'll Come Running." The Supersuckers's Ron Heathman plays lead guitar on "Lemuria Rising."

== Critical reception ==
The Austin American-Statesman wrote that "rock doesn't get much uglier than this Johnny Thunders-derived, organ-bleeding Washington state band."

== Track listing ==
1. Press Gang
2. I Drink the Wine
3. Bunkhouse
4. Idle Hands
5. Rum to Whiskey
6. I'll Come Running
7. Demon Brother
8. Lemuria Rising
9. Somebody Else's Baby
10. In This Town
11. No Grave but the Sea
12. Fields of Fire
