= Head for the Shallow =

Studio album by Big Business
- Released: January 25, 2005
- Recorded: August 2004
- Genre: Heavy metal
- Length: 35:35
- Label: Hydra Head Records (HH666-82)
- Producer: Phil Ek

Big Business chronology
Head for the Shallow (2005)	Here Come the Waterworks (2007)

Professional ratings
Review scores
Source	Rating
AllMusic	3.5/5 stars

Head for the Shallow is the debut album from heavy metal/sludge metal band Big Business, released on January 25, 2005 by Hydra Head Records.

== Track listing ==
1. "O.G." – 4:21
2. "Focus Pocus" – 5:19
3. "White Pizazz" – 4:38
4. "Stareadactyl" – 2:59
5. "Easter Romantic" – 5:09
6. "Technically Electrified" – 3:47
7. "Eis Hexe" – 4:05
8. "Off Off Broadway" – 5:17
