= Empty Bottles, Broken Hearts =

Studio album by Murder City Devils
- Released: September 22, 1998
- Genre: Punk rock
- Label: Sub Pop
- Producer: Jack Endino

Murder City Devils chronology
The Murder City Devils (1997)	Empty Bottles, Broken Hearts (1998)	In Name and Blood (2000)

Professional ratings
Review scores
Source	Rating
AllMusic	3/5 stars

Empty Bottles, Broken Hearts is the second studio album by punk rock band Murder City Devils. It was recorded, mixed and produced by Jack Endino, and released in 1998 on Sub Pop.

On the cover art, the album title appears as Empty Bottles, Broken Hearts, while the reverse side reads Broken Bottles, Empty Hearts, suggesting a more dark and violent alternate title.

== Critical reception ==
CMJ New Music Monthly praised the album, writing that "grunge is back, low, mean and hedonistic as ever." The A.V. Club wrote that "the group dredges up the sound of the proto-punks of the late '60s and early '70s, making music that screams to be heard but doesn't care if you don't listen."

== Track listing ==
1. I Want A Lot Now (So Come On) - 3:27
2. Dancin' Shoes - 2:26
3. 18 Wheels - 3:21
4. Left Hand Right Hand - 2:28
5. Ready For More - 3:49
6. Cradle To The Grave - 4:16
7. Dear Hearts - 3:21
8. Hey Sailor - 2:05
9. Johnny Thunders - 2:12
10. Stars In Her Eyes - 3:26
11. Another Round On You - 2:36
12. Every Shitty Thing - 3:59

== Personnel ==
- Spencer Moody — vocals
- Dann Gallucci — guitar, organ
- Nate Manny — guitar, bass
- Derek Fudesco — bass, organ
- Coady Willis — drums
