= Spencer Moody =

American vocalist

- Origin: Seattle, Washington, United States
- Genres: Garage Rock, Noise Rock
- Occupations: Songwriter, Proprietor
- Instrument: Vocals
- Years active: 1996–present

Spencer Moody is the American vocalist for Seattle-based noise rock group Triumph of Lethargy Skinned Alive to Death. He was the lead vocalist for the Murder City Devils until their breakup in 2001, and returned to the band when they reformed in 2006.

In addition to his musical endeavors, Moody also owned and operated a self-proclaimed "junk shop" called The Anne Bonny in Seattle, which closed in 2010. The shop took its name from one of the few well-documented female pirates.

Moody left the voicemail that was eventually turned into the song "Call to Dial-a-Song" on Modest Mouse's Sad Sappy Sucker album.

On May 19, 2014 Impose Magazine premiered Spencer Moody's solo track "Single Car Accident." The single will be the A-Side to his next seven inch release on Riot House Records.
