= The Murder City Devils =

American garage rock band

- Origin: Seattle, Washington
- Genres: Garage rock; punk rock
- Years active: 1996–2001; 2006–present
- Label: Sub Pop
- Members: Spencer Moody; Dann Gallucci; Derek Fudesco; Coady Willis; Gabe Kerbrat
- Past members: Nick Dewitt; Nate Manny; Leslie Hardy
- Website: http://www.themurdercitydevils.com

The Murder City Devils is an American garage rock band formed in 1996.

== History ==
The band's original lineup, consisting of Spencer Moody, Dann Gallucci, Derek Fudesco, Coady Willis, and Nate Manny, formed in Seattle, Washington, in 1996. Gabe Kerbrat was their permanent roadie, and was considered a member. Within a year, the band had released two singles, Three Natural Sixes (Hopscotch Records #5) and Dance Hall Music (Empty Records MTR-354), and signed with the Die Young Stay Pretty label, a subsidiary of Sub Pop. Their self-titled debut album was released in 1997.

In 1998, the band released Empty Bottles, Broken Hearts, its second full-length album. This release saw a greatly increased use of electric organ, and in the same year they recruited Leslie Hardy as their full-time keyboard player. Hardy had previously played bass guitar for several Seattle bands, including several months in Hole. The Murder City Devils then embarked on a year-long tour of North America to support the record. During that tour, they played with At the Drive-In, Pearl Jam, The Black Halos, Modest Mouse (for whom Dann Gallucci also played guitar), and Built to Spill.

After a short break, the band released In Name and Blood in 2000, with photos in the liner notes depicting every member as a murder victim. They also appeared as both individual actors as well as a band in David Larson's independent film The Edge of Quarrel.

The band released the Thelema EP in 2001. Mid-tour, keyboardist Leslie Hardy left the band. Later that year the band broke up due to circumstances surrounding Hardy's departure. (The Stranger Sept 27 – Oct 3, 2001 issue, It's My Party column by Kathleen Wilson). Hardy was replaced by Nick Dewitt for their final concerts. Bassist Derek Fudesco agreed to leave the band in September 2001 to focus on his own new band, Pretty Girls Make Graves.

The band's farewell concert on Halloween 2001 (October 31) at Seattle's Showbox Theater was recorded and released by Sub Pop in 2003, titled R.I.P. and included two previously unrecorded songs. It was also released on DVD in 2005.

=== Return ===
In 2006 the band announced they were playing a July show in Seattle with all original members. The band performed on July 29 at the Capitol Hill Block Party closing the two-day music festival on Saturday night. The day following the Block Party performance the band played a show with The Blood Brothers at The Showbox in downtown Seattle, the same venue where "R.I.P." was recorded. The show was not announced until the end of their set at the Block Party.

The next show was Saturday, November 3 at Mowhawk in Austin, Texas with The Peabodys and Hex Dispensers while in town for Fun Fun Fun Fest, on November 3–4, 2007 in Austin, Texas. The band played a handful of shows throughout 2008 and launched a brief West Coast tour on February 11, 2009 at Seattle's The Showbox. Murder City Devils' week-long tour culminated in Los Angeles with two performances at the Henry Fonda Theater on February 17 and 18, 2009.

=== New material ===
At the end of their set, on December 30, 2009, at The Showbox in Seattle, Washington, Hardy thanked the audience for coming and confirmed that the band was working on new material. No additional information was given. After the set finished, the band returned to the stage and performed a cover of The Birthday Party's song, "Several Sins."

On July 17, 2010, a live performance of an untitled new song was uploaded to YouTube. It was filmed at their July 15, 2010, performance at The Note, in West Chester, Pennsylvania (a venue that has since closed).

On October 17, 2010, a live performance of another untitled new song was uploaded to YouTube. It was filmed at their October 16, 2010, performance at The Showbox in Seattle.

In January 2012, the band released a 7-inch with two new songs, recorded in San Pedro, California. The new songs were "Every Day I Rise" and "Ball Busters in the Peanut Gallery".

On August 5, 2014, the band released their first album in 11 years, The White Ghost Has Blood on Its Hands Again, which includes eight songs.

The band performed at the Punk Rock Bowling & Music Festival in Las Vegas, Nevada on May 24, 2015, and again on September 26, 2021.

== Members ==
- Spencer Moody - vocals (1996-2001, 2006–present)
- Dann Gallucci - guitar (1996-2001, 2006–present)
- Derek Fudesco - bass (1996-2001, 2006–present)
- Coady Willis - drums (1996-2001, 2006–present)
- Nate Manny - guitar, bass (1996-2001, 2006–present)
- Leslie Hardy - keyboard (1998-2001, 2006-2010)
- Nick Dewitt - keyboard (2001)

== Discography ==
=== Studio albums ===
- The Murder City Devils (1997)
- Empty Bottles, Broken Hearts (1998)
- In Name and Blood (2000)
- The White Ghost Has Blood on Its Hands Again (2014)

=== Extended play ===
- Thelema (2001)

=== Live album ===
- R.I.P. (Live album of last show at The Showbox in Seattle, October 31, 2001) (2003)

=== Compilation album ===
- Feather Bed Whiskey Blanket (Boxed Set of all 4 albums & Thelema) (2009)

=== Singles ===
- "Three Natural Sixes" (1997)
- "Dance Hall Music" (1997)
- "Dancin Shoes" (1998)
- "Christmas Bonus Single" (1998)
- "Murder City Devils / Botch Split" (Sound track to the movie The Edge of Quarrel) (1999)
- "Murder City Devils / Glucifer Split" (1999)
- "Murder City Devils / At The Drive-In Split" (2000)
- "Every Day I Rise" / "Ball Busters in the Peanut Gallery" (2011)
- "Hill and 6th Street" / Pele's Feet" (2024)

=== Music videos ===
- 18 Wheels (1998)
- Idle Hands (2000)

=== Compilation inclusions ===
- Technology (Remix of "Dance Hall Music" by DJ Ropstyle) (2000)
- Free the West Memphis 3 (Cover of "She" by The Misfits) (2000)
- Give The People What We Want: Songs of The Kinks (Cover of "Alcohol" by The Kinks) (2001)
- Buddyhead Suicide Sampler CD (Remix of "Press Gang" by the Latch Brothers) (2004)

=== Video ===
- The Edge of Quarrel (VHS) (2000)
- Rock & Roll Won't Wait (VHS) (2001)
- Rock & Roll Won't Wait (DVD) (2004)
- The End (DVD) (2005)
- The Edge of Quarrel (DVD) (2007)
