= Toshi Kasai =

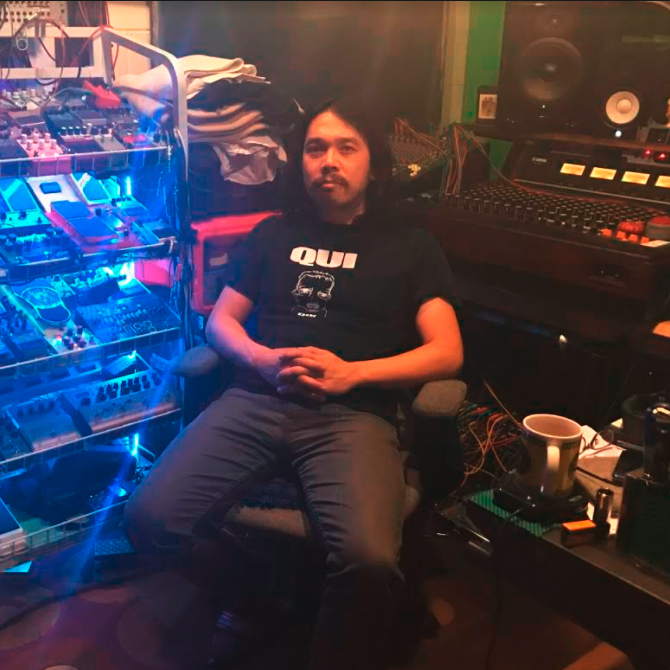
- Toshi Kasai at Sound of Sirens, 2020

Background information
- Occupations: Record producer; engineer; mixer
- Instruments: Vocals; guitar; keyboards
- Years active: 1997–present
- Labels: Joyful Noise Recordings, et al.
- Website: http://www.toshikasai.com

Toshi Kasai is a Japanese record producer, engineer, mixer and musician. He is most well known for his strong vocal production work with hard rock and metal groups such as his long standing relationship with The Melvins and his work with Tool.

In addition to his recorded production work, Toshi was a member of the band Big Business and Nate Mendel's band Lieutenant. He is also a member of Altamont, The Dale Crover Band. In 2019, he opened for Melvins and Redd Kross under his own name, playing Moog Synthesizer to oscilloscope and projections.

== Biography ==
Hilbish Design released a pedal of Toshi's design called the T-Fuzz, the pedal, like the other pedal designs of the manufacturer, features artwork by Mackie Osborne.

He also has his own project called Plan D, this project is similar to a drum-triggered synthesizer set with Dale Crover and Troy Zeigler (one show) where he opened for Melvins Lite in 2011. This set was cited as an inspiration behind the Plan D project.

On March 12, 2020 Joyful Noise Recordings announced the release of his project: Plan D. It was received with favorable coverage from outlets such as Rolling Stone and others:

"From his LA studio, Toshi created a complex drum-triggering system which is the catalyst for Plan D. He then spent the last several years luring drummers into his Sound of Sirens studio, letting them go nuts behind the kit. Meanwhile, Toshi has been behind the board, capturing the signal from each drum hit, and sending that signal to a variety of analog synthesizers. The result is some of the craziest sounding prog-like instrumental music you're likely to ever hear."

included on the project are drummers:

- Dale Crover (Melvins, Redd Kross, Nirvana, Hew Time)
- Coady Willis (Big Business, Melvins, The Murder City Devils, Hew Time)
- Clem Burke (Blondie, Eurythmics)
- Matt Cameron (Pearl Jam, Soundgarden)
- Joe Plummer (Mister Heavenly, Cold War Kids, The Shins, Hew Time)
- Paul Christensen (Qui, hepa.Titus)
- Troy Zeigler (Serj Tankian, Juliette Lewis, Buckethead)
- Ches Smith (Secret Chiefs 3, Marc Ribot, Mary Halvorson)
- Matt Chamberlain (Fiona Apple, Bob Dylan, Bill Frisell)
- Danny Frankel (Lou Reed, Kamikaze Ground Crew, Urban Verbs, Bo Diddley)
- Gregg Bissonette (Ringo Starr, David Lee Roth, Electric Light Orchestra)
- Pej Mon (Satyasena, Secret Chiefs 3, Girth)
- Mindee Jorgensen (Dale Crover Band, Dangerously Sleazy, ModPods)
- Dave Lombardo (Slayer, Mr Bungle, Misfits, Suicidal Tendencies)
- John Tempesta (The Cult, White Zombie, Testament)
- Stephen Perkins (Jane's Addiction, Porno For Pyros, Infectious Grooves)
- Kyle Stevenson (Helmet, Big Collapse)
- Angela Lese (Jax Hollow, Raelyn Nelson Band)

== Selected production work ==
Toshi Kasai has worked with the following musicians and groups.

- Melvins
- Jello Biafra
- Helmet
- Nate Mendel (of Foo Fighters)
- Matt Cameron of Soundgarden / Pearl Jam
- GODSWOUNDS
- BAD ACID TRIP

== Production engineering and mixing work ==
Year	Band	Album	Credit
2000	Capital Eye	Mood Swingz	Engineer
2002	Melvins	Hostile Ambient Takeover	Engineer, Mixing
2004	Jello Biafra	Never Breathe What You Can't See	Engineer, Mixing
2004	Dave Matthews Band	The Gorge	Engineer, Editing, Digital Editing
2005	Altamont	The Monkee's Uncle	Engineer, Audio Engineer, Fender Rhodes, Organ
2005	Dave Matthews Band	Weekend on the Rocks	Engineer, Digital Editing
2005	Jello Biafra and Melvins	Sieg Howdy!	Engineer
2006	Melvins	A Senile Animal	Engineer, Mixing
2006	Melvins	2005: A Live History of Gluttony and Lust	Engineer, Audio Engineer
2008	Totimoshi	Milagrosa	Engineer, Audio Engineer, Mixing, Jaw Harp
2008	Tweak Bird	Reservations	Producer, Main Personnel, Guitar, Synthesizer, Vocals (Background), Noise
2009	Brian Walsby	Manchild 4/Pick Your Battles [Book + CD]	Engineer
2009	Shrinebuilder	Shrinebuilder	Producer, Engineer, Synthesizer
2009	Zu	Carboniferous	Producer, Engineer
2010	Red Sparowes	The Fear Is Excruciating, But Therein Lies the Answer	Engineer, Mixing
2010	Helmet	Seeing Eye Dog	Engineer, Mixing, Additional Production
2010	Melvins	The Bride Screamed Murder	Engineer
2010	Tweak Bird	Tweak Bird	Mixing, Digital Engineer
2011	Hurry Up Shotgun	Hurry Up Shotgun	Producer, Engineer
2011	Big Business	Quadruple Single	Producer, Engineer
2011	Melvins	Sugar Daddy Live	Engineer
2012	Anywhere	Anywhere	Producer, Engineer, Mixing, Keyboards
2012	Indian Handcrafts	Civil Disobedience for Losers	Producer, Engineer, Mixing, Screams, Vocal Coach
2012	Marriages	Kitsune	Engineer, Mixing
2012	Tweak Bird	Undercover Crops	Engineer, Mixing
2013	Federation X	We Do What We Must	Producer, Engineer
2013	Dumb Numbers	Dumb Numbers	Engineer, Mixing
2013	Victory and Associates	Better Luck Next Life	Producer, Engineer
2013	Melvins	Everybody Loves Sausages	Engineer
2013	Melvins	Tres Cabrones	Engineer, Toy Piano, Omnichord
2014	Melvins	Hold It In	Engineer
2014	Hurry Up Shotgun	Abracadabraham Lincoln	Producer, Engineer
2014	Qui	Life, Water, Living...	Producer, Engineer
2014	Hew Time	Hew Time	Producer, Engineer
2014	The Luxembourg Signal	The Luxembourg Signal	Engineer
2014	GODSWOUNDS	Death to the Babyboomers	Producer, Engineer, Guitar, Keyboards, Percussion, Vocals
2014	King Buzzo	This Machine Kills Artists	Engineer
2015	Indian Handcrafts	Creeps	Producer, Engineer, Mixing, Vocals
2015	Lieutenant	If I Kill This Thing We're All Going to Eat for a Week	Producer, Engineer, Guitar, Mandolin, Mellotron, Melodion, Piano, Synthesizer, Tambourine, Toy Piano, Vocals (Background), Wurlitzer
2015	Leeches of Lore	Motel of Infinity	Producer, Engineer
2015	Melvins	The Bulls & The Bees/Electroretard	Engineer
2015	Conan Neutron & the Secret Friends	The Enemy of Everyone	Producer, Engineer, Vocals, Keyboards, Percussion
2015	DEAD	Captains of Industry	Producer, Engineer, Vocals, Guitar, Noise
2015	DEAD	Captains Of The Void/Captains of Reincarnation	Producer, Engineer, Vocals, Guitar, Noise
2015	Sons of Huns	While Sleeping Stay Awake	Engineer, Mixing
2016	Melvins	Basses Loaded	Producer, Engineer
2016	Helmet	Dead to the World	Engineer
2016	Orphan Goggles	Meat Face Needs Eyes	Producer, Engineer, Keyboards
2016	Dumb Numbers	II	Engineer
2016	Mike & the Melvins	Three Men and a Baby	Engineer, Mixing
2016	Acid King	Middle of Nowhere, Centre of Everywhere	Engineer
2016	Nocturnal Habits	New Skin for Old Children	Engineer
2016	Conan Neutron & the Secret Friends	The Art of Murder	Producer, Engineer, Vocals, Keyboards, Percussion
2017	Melvins	A Walk with Love & Death	Producer, Engineer, Noise
2017	Low Flying Hawks	Genkaku	Producer, Engineer, Mixing, Vocals, Fx Vocals, Guitar
2017	DEAD	We Won't Let You Sleep	Producer, Engineer
2017	Fat Dukes of Fuck	A Compendium of Desperation, Morality and Dick Jokes	Producer, Engineer
2017	Primitive Race	Soul Pretender	Drum Engineering
2017	Dale Crover	The Fickle Finger of Fate	Producer, Mixing, Vocals, Guitar, Keyboards, Jaw Harp, Bowed Banjo, Composer
2017	Legend of the Seagullmen	Shipswreck	Composer
2018	Legend of the Seagullmen	Legend of the Seagullmen	Engineer, Mixing, Composer
2018	Melvins	Pinkus Abortion Technician	Engineer
2018	Legend of the Seagullmen	Ballad of the Deep Sea Diver	Composer
2018	Legend of the Seagullmen	The Fogger	Composer
2018	Prism Bitch	Prism Bitch ep	Producer, Engineer
2018	All Souls	All Souls	Producer, Engineer
2018	Qui	Snuh	Producer, Engineer
2019	Primitive Race	Cranial Matter	Engineer, Drum Engineering, Drum Recordings, Additional Production, Arranger, Instrumentation, Remixing
2019	Conan Neutron & the Secret Friends	Protons and Electrons	Producer, Engineer, Vocals, Keyboards, Percussion
2019	Hurry Up Shotgun	This Crystal Vessel	Producer, Engineer
2019	Alright Spider	Desolation	Producer, Engineer, Synth, Theremin

== Band member ==
- Big Business: Guitar, Keyboards, Backing vocals
- Altamont: Guitar, Piano, Organ
- Lieutenant (with Nate Mendel): Guitar, Keyboard
- The Dale Crover Band: Keys, Banjo, Ukulele, Vocals
- Plan D

== Interviews and External links ==
- website
- | Interview | Toshi Kasai "I don't need to be shy"
