= Modest Mouse discography =

Band discography

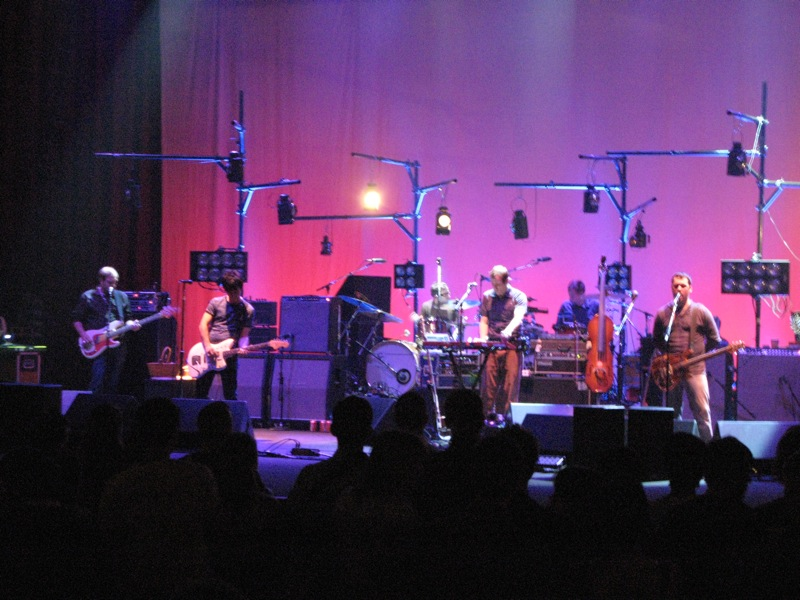
- Modest Mouse performing in 2007
- Studio albums: 8
- Extended plays: 6
- Live albums: 1
- Compilation albums: 2
- Singles: 25
- B-sides: 21
- Music videos: 16
- Reissues: 9
- Cassettes: 4

The discography of Modest Mouse, an American indie rock band, consists of eight studio albums, six extended plays, two compilation albums, four low fidelity cassette releases, one live album, 25 singles, and nine reissues. Three of their releases have been certified at least gold by the Recording Industry Association of America (RIAA) for shipments in excess of 500,000 copies. One release has further been certified double platinum, for shipments in excess of 2,000,000 copies.

Modest Mouse formed in 1992 in Issaquah, Washington. This Is a Long Drive for Someone with Nothing to Think About was released as the band's debut album in April 1996. Sad Sappy Sucker was originally intended to be released instead, but was shelved. Second album The Lonesome Crowded West followed in November 1997, and helped to earn the band a cult following; it has been cited by several publications as one of the best albums of the 1990s. After the album's release, Modest Mouse signed to major label Epic Records; The Moon & Antarctica, the band's major-label debut, was released in June 2000 to widespread acclaim from critics. The album was a harbinger of increased mainstream exposure to come; it was the band's first to chart in the United States, peaking at No. 120 on the Billboard 200. Following the success of The Moon & Antarctica, Sad Sappy Sucker was finally released in April 2001, several years after it had initially been shelved.

Mainstream recognition of Modest Mouse accelerated in 2004, with the release of Good News for People Who Love Bad News in April. The album charted at No. 18 in the United States and was their first to chart outside of their home country, peaking at No. 37 in Scotland and No. 40 in the United Kingdom. Lead single "Float On" was the band's first hit, peaking at No. 68 on the Billboard Hot 100 and at No. 1 on the same publication's Alternative Songs chart. Follow-up single "Ocean Breathes Salty" was a modest success, reaching No. 6 on Alternative Songs; both singles have since been certified gold by the RIAA. March 2007's We Were Dead Before the Ship Even Sank was the only Modest Mouse album to feature former Smiths guitarist Johnny Marr as a member of the band. The album peaked at No. 1 in the United States and Canada, and also charted in several other countries. Lead single "Dashboard" currently stands as the band's highest-charting song to date on the Billboard Hot 100, where it peaked at No. 61; it also peaked at No. 5 on Alternative Songs.

In 2014, This Is a Long Drive for Someone with Nothing to Think About and The Lonesome Crowded West were re-released by frontman Isaac Brock's record label, Glacial Pace. The following March, Strangers to Ourselves was released as Modest Mouse's first studio album in eight years. "Lampshades on Fire", which had been released as the album's lead single in December 2014, was a No. 1 hit on Alternative Songs, with the album itself peaking at No. 3 in the United States and appearing on several other album charts elsewhere.

== Albums ==
=== Studio albums ===
List of studio albums, with selected chart positions, sales figures and certifications
Title	Details	Peak chart positions										Sales	Certifications
Title	Details	US	AUS	AUT	CAN	GER	IRL	NOR	NZ	SCO	UK	Sales	Certifications
This Is a Long Drive for Someone with Nothing to Think About	Released: April 16, 1996; Label: Up (UP027); Format: CD, 2×LP	— (Note: This Is a Long Drive for Someone with Nothing to Think About did not enter the US Billboard 200, but peaked at number five on the Vinyl Albums Chart.)	—	—	—	—	—	—	—	—	—		
The Lonesome Crowded West	Released: November 18, 1997; Label: Up (UP044); Format: CD, 2×LP	— (Note: The Lonesome Crowded West did not enter the US Billboard 200, but peaked at number one on the Vinyl Albums Chart.)	—	—	—	—	—	—	—	—	— (Note: The Lonesome Crowded West did not enter the UK Albums Chart, but peaked at number 32 on the UK Vinyl Albums Chart.)	US: 60,000	
The Moon & Antarctica	Released: June 13, 2000; Label: Epic (EK 63871); Format: CD, 2×LP	120	—	—	—	—	—	—	—	—	— (Note: The Moon & Antarctica did not enter the UK Albums Chart, but peaked at number 40 on the UK Vinyl Albums Chart.)	US: 492,000	RIAA: Gold
Good News for People Who Love Bad News	Released: April 6, 2004; Label: Epic (EK 87125); Format: CD, 2×LP	18	— (Note: Good News for People Who Love Bad News did not enter the Australian ARIA Albums Chart but peaked at number eight on the ARIA Hitseekers Chart.)	—	52	—	—	—	—	37	40	US: 1,500,000	RIAA: 2× Platinum; BPI: Silver; MC: Platinum
We Were Dead Before the Ship Even Sank	Released: March 20, 2007; Label: Epic (82876 86139 2); Format: CD, 2×LP	1	12	—	1	65	22	22	26	35	47	US: 649,000	RIAA: Gold; MC: Gold
Strangers to Ourselves	Released: March 17, 2015; Label: Epic (88875049122); Format: CD, 2×LP	3	15	40	3	47	26	—	39	31	28	US: 73,000	
The Golden Casket	Released: June 25, 2021; Label: Epic; Format: CD, 2×LP, cassette	87	—	—	—	—	—	—	—	70	— (Note: The Golden Casket did not enter the UK Albums Chart, but peaked at number 80 on the UK Album Downloads Chart.)		
An Eraser and a Maze	Released: June 5, 2026; Label: Glacial Pace; Format: CD, 2×LP, digital	128	—	—	—	—	—	—	—	47	— (Note: An Eraser and a Maze did not enter the UK Albums Chart, but peaked at number 46 on the UK Album Sales Chart.)		
"—" denotes a recording that did not chart or was not released in that territory.

=== Cassettes ===
Year	Title
1992/1994	Uncle Bunny Faces' Useless Analogy Involving Distance, Freight Trains, and Half Ripe Limes (It Doesn't Matter, Limes Are Sour Either Way)
1992/1994	Tube-Fruit, All Smiles and Chocolate
1992/1994	A Mouthful of Lost Thoughts
1992/1994	Sad Sappy Sucker Chokin' on a Mouthful of Lost Thoughts

=== Compilation albums ===
List of compilation albums, with selected chart positions
Title	Details	Peak chart positions	
Title	Details	US	US Ind.
Building Nothing Out of Something	Released: January 18, 2000; Label: Up (UP073); Format: CD, LP	— (Note: Building Nothing Out of Something did not enter the US Billboard 200, but peaked at number 17 on the US Heatseekers Albums Chart.)	13
Sad Sappy Sucker	Released: April 24, 2001; Label: K (KLP131); Format: CD, LP	— (Note: Sad Sappy Sucker did not enter the US Billboard 200, but peaked at number 26 on the US Heatseekers Albums Chart.)	21
"—" denotes a recording that did not chart or was not released in that territory.

=== Live albums ===
List of live albums
Title	Details
Baron von Bullshit Rides Again	Released: April 13, 2004; Label: Epic (EL 92089); Format: CD

== EPs ==
List of EPs, with selected chart positions
Title	Details	Peak chart positions			
Title	Details	US	US Rock	AUS	CAN
Blue Cadet-3, Do You Connect?	Released: 1994; Label: K (IPU58); Format: 7" LP	—	—	—	—
Interstate 8	Released: August 6, 1996; Label: Up (UP035); Format: CD	—	—	—	—
The Fruit That Ate Itself	Released: May 13, 1997; Label: K (KLP 63); Format: CD	—	—	—	—
Night on the Sun	Released: 1999; Label: Rebel Beat Factory (RBFM-1240), Up (UP090)	— (Note: Night on the Sun did not enter the US Billboard 200, but peaked at number 10 on the Vinyl Albums Chart.)	—	—	—
Everywhere and His Nasty Parlour Tricks	Released: September 25, 2001; Label: Epic (EK 62104); Format: CD, LP	147	—	—	—
No One's First, and You're Next	Released: August 4, 2009; Label: Epic (88697 46289); Format: CD, LP	15	3	91	14
"—" denotes a recording that did not chart or was not released in that territory.

== Reissues ==
List of reissued albums
Title	Details
The Moon & Antarctica	Released: March 9, 2004; Label: Epic (EK 92034); Format: CD
Good News for People Who Love Bad News	Released: October 11, 2005; Label: Epic (EN 97711); Format: DualDisc
The Moon & Antarctica	Released: April 17, 2010; Label: Epic/Legacy; Format: LP
The Fruit That Ate Itself	Released: November 9, 2010; Label: Glacial Pace; Format: CD, LP
Sad Sappy Sucker	Released: November 9, 2010; Label: Glacial Pace; Format: CD, LP
This Is a Long Drive for Someone with Nothing to Think About	Released: October 28, 2014; Label: Glacial Pace; Format: CD, 2×LP
The Lonesome Crowded West	Released: November 4, 2014; Label: Glacial Pace; Format: CD, 2×LP
Interstate 8	Released: 2015; Label: Glacial Pace; Format: CD, LP
Building Nothing Out of Something	Released: 2015; Label: Glacial Pace; Format: CD, LP
Night on the Sun	Released: July 29, 2016; Label: Glacial Pace; Format: CD, LP
Good News For People Who Love Bad News: 20th Anniversary Expanded Edition	Released: April 6, 2024; Label: Epic; Format: CD, 2×LP

== Singles ==
List of singles, with selected chart positions and certifications, showing year released and album name
Title	Year	Peak chart positions										Certifications	Album
Title	Year	US	US Alt.	US Pop	US Rock	AUS	CAN	CAN Rock	MEX	SCO	UK	Certifications	Album
"Broke"	1996	—	—	—	×	—	—	—	×	—	—		Building Nothing Out of Something
"A Life of Arctic Sounds"	1997	—	—	—	×	—	—	—	×	—	—		Building Nothing Out of Something
"Birds vs. Worms"	1997	—	—	—	×	—	—	—	×	—	—		Sad Sappy Sucker
"Other People's Lives"	1998	—	—	—	×	—	—	—	×	—	—		Building Nothing Out of Something
"Never Ending Math Equation"	1998	—	—	—	×	—	—	—	×	—	—		Building Nothing Out of Something
"Whenever You See Fit" (with 764-HERO)	1998	—	—	—	×	—	—	—	×	—	— (Note: "Whenever You See Fit" did not enter the UK Singles Chart, but peaked at number 91 on the UK Physical Singles Chart.)		Non-album single
"Heart Cooks Brain"	1999	—	—	—	×	—	—	—	×	—	—		The Lonesome Crowded West
"Float On"	2004	68	1	32	— (Note: "Float On" did not enter the Hot Rock & Alternative Songs chart, but peaked at number 24 on the Rock Digital Songs chart.)	94	31	24	×	48	46	RIAA: 5× Platinum; BPI: Silver; MC: 3× Platinum	Good News for People Who Love Bad News
"Ocean Breathes Salty"	2005	—	6	—	×	—	—	—	×	—	96	RIAA: Gold	Good News for People Who Love Bad News
"The World at Large"	2005	—	—	—	×	—	—	—	×	—	—	RIAA: Gold	Good News for People Who Love Bad News
"Dashboard"	2007	61	5	56	— (Note: "Dashboard" did not enter the Hot Rock & Alternative Songs chart, but peaked at number 5 on the Adult Alternative Airplay chart.)	—	38	12	×	36	111		We Were Dead Before the Ship Even Sank
"Missed the Boat"	2007	—	24	—	— (Note: "Missed the Boat" did not enter the Hot Rock & Alternative Songs chart, but peaked at number 6 on the Adult Alternative Airplay chart.)	—	—	40	×	—	—		We Were Dead Before the Ship Even Sank
"We've Got Everything"	2007	—	—	—	×	—	—	—	×	—	—		We Were Dead Before the Ship Even Sank
"Little Motel"	2007	—	—	—	×	—	—	—	×	—	—		We Were Dead Before the Ship Even Sank
"King Rat"	2009	—	—	—	—	—	—	—	—	—	—		No One's First, and You're Next
"Satellite Skin"	2009	—	—	—	—	—	—	—	—	—	—		No One's First, and You're Next
"Autumn Beds"	2009	—	—	—	—	—	—	—	—	—	—		No One's First, and You're Next
"Perpetual Motion Machine"	2009	—	—	—	—	—	—	—	—	—	—		No One's First, and You're Next
"The Whale Song"	2009	—	—	—	—	—	—	—	—	—	—		No One's First, and You're Next
"White Lies, Yellow Teeth"	2014	— (Note: "White Lies, Yellow Teeth" did not enter the Billboard Hot 100, but peaked at number 15 on the Hot Singles Sales chart.)	—	—	—	—	—	—	—	—	— (Note: "White Lies, Yellow Teeth" did not enter the UK Singles Chart, but peaked at number 57 on the UK Physical Singles Chart.)		Non-album singles
"Too Many Fiestas for Reuben"	2014	— (Note: "Too Many Fiestas for Reuben" did not enter the Billboard Hot 100, but peaked at number 12 on the Hot Singles Sales chart.)	—	—	—	—	—	—	—	—	— (Note: "Too Many Fiestas for Reuben" did not enter the UK Singles Chart, but peaked at number 62 on the UK Physical Singles Chart.)		Non-album singles
"Lampshades on Fire"	2014	— (Note: "Lampshades on Fire" did not enter the Billboard Hot 100, but peaked at number 15 on the Hot Singles Sales chart.)	1	—	12	—	—	3	42	—	—		Strangers to Ourselves
"Coyotes"	2015	—	—	—	48	—	—	—	—	—	—		Strangers to Ourselves
"The Best Room"	2015	—	—	—	44	—	—	—	—	—	—		Strangers to Ourselves
"Of Course We Know"	2015	—	—	—	—	—	—	—	—	—	—		Strangers to Ourselves
"The Ground Walks, with Time in a Box"	2015	—	19	—	— (Note: "The Ground Walks, with Time in a Box" did not enter the Hot Rock & Alternative Songs chart, but peaked at number 31 on the Rock Airplay chart.)	—	—	40	—	—	—		Strangers to Ourselves
"Poison the Well"	2019	—	—	—	—	—	—	—	—	—	—		Non-album singles
"Ice Cream Party"	2019	—	—	—	—	—	—	—	—	—	—		Non-album singles
"We Are Between"	2021	—	1	—	33	—	—	7	—	×	—		The Golden Casket
"Leave a Light On"	2021	—	—	—	—	—	—	—	—	×	—		The Golden Casket
"The Sun Hasn't Left"	2021	—	21	—	— (Note: "The Sun Hasn't Left" did not enter the Hot Rock & Alternative Songs chart, but peaked at number 30 on the Rock & Alternative Airplay chart.)	—	—	—	—	×	—		The Golden Casket
"Look How Far..."	2026	—	—	—	—	—	—	—	—	×	—		An Eraser and a Maze
"Picking Dragons' Pockets"	2026	—	6	—	— (Note: "Picking Dragons' Pockets" did not enter the Hot Rock & Alternative Songs chart, but peaked at number 15 on the Rock & Alternative Airplay chart.)	—	—	—	—	×	—		An Eraser and a Maze
"Third Side of the Moon"	2026	—	—	—	—	—	—	—	—	×	—		An Eraser and a Maze
"Life's A Dream"	2026	—	—	—	—	—	—	—	—	×	—		An Eraser and a Maze
"—" denotes a recording that did not chart or was not released in that territory. "×" denotes periods where charts did not exist or were not archived.

== Other appearances ==
Year	Album	Song
1998	Zum Audio Vol. 2	"Buttons to Push the Buttons"
1999	I Love Metal	"South of Heaven" (Slayer cover, with Califone)
2000	The Unaccompanied Voice	"Leaflets Gabe"
2002	The Giant Rock 'N' Roll Swindle	"White Lies, Yellow Teeth"
2011	Live From Nowhere Near You Vol. II	"Dead End Job at the Dead Letter Office"
2011	Rave On Buddy Holly	"That'll Be the Day" (The Crickets cover)

== Music videos ==
Year	Title	Director(s)
2004	"Float On"	Christopher Mills
2004	"Ocean Breathes Salty"	Chris Milk
2007	"Dashboard"	Mathew Cullen; Grady Hall
2007	"Missed the Boat"	Walter Robot
2007	"We've Got Everything"	Joe Stakun
2007	"Little Motel"	Justin Francis
2007	"People as Places as People"	Andy Bruntel
2007	"Fly Trapped in a Jar"	Adam Toht
2007	"Invisible"	Terri Timely
2009	"King Rat"	Heath Ledger; Daniel Auber
2009	"Satellite Skin"	Kevin Willis
2009	"The Whale Song"	Nando Costa
2015	"Coyotes"	Unknown
2015	"Lampshades on Fire"	Jorge Torres–Torres
2015	"The Ground Walks, with Time in a Box"	Jorge Torres–Torres
2021	"We Are Between"	Kyle Thrash
2026	“Life’s A Dream”	Isaac Brock
