= The Fruit That Ate Itself =

EP by Modest Mouse
- Released: May 13, 1997
- Recorded: Late 1996
- Studio: Dub Narcotic
- Genre: Indie rock
- Length: 20:42
- Labels: K KLP63; Glacial Pace (2010 reissue)
- Producer: Calvin Johnson

Modest Mouse chronology
Interstate 8 (1996)	The Fruit That Ate Itself (1997)	The Lonesome Crowded West (1997)

The Fruit That Ate Itself is the third EP by indie rock band Modest Mouse, released in 1997. The album was recorded at Calvin Johnson's Dub Narcotic Studios.

== Release ==
Originally, the session was planned to record a 7" release, but it soon expanded into an EP. The track "Dirty Fingernails" also appears on Yoyo A Go Go, a compilation album released by Yoyo Records.

A limited Japanese edition was also released with 5 bonus tracks, which appeared on the band's debut single, "Blue Cadet-3, Do You Connect?".

Along with Sad Sappy Sucker, the EP was reissued on CD and vinyl by Glacial Pace Recordings on November 9, 2010.

== Production ==
Upon its release, the band expressed some embarrassment with the marginal nature of some of the tracks in an interview in The Rocket, joking that Calvin Johnson would start recording every time they jingled their keys. The album features several experimental interludes, consisting of music reversed in post-production.

== Reception ==
Professional ratings
Review scores
Source	Rating
AllMusic	3/5 stars
Pitchfork	(7.8/10)
PopMatters	(8/10)
Sputnikmusic	2/5 stars

Pitchfork called the release "abrasive" and "harrowing", but acknowledged that it was a "useful window back into the pre-Internet era of indie rock".

== Track listing ==
1. "Sunspots" – 0:38
2. "The Waydown" – 2:30
3. "Fruit" – 0:52
4. "Dirty Fingernails" – 3:20
5. "Sunspots in the House of the Late Scapegoat" – 2:42
6. "The Fruit That Ate Itself" – 3:17
7. "Way Down" – 0:43
8. "Summer" – 3:12
9. "Karma's Payment" – 3:28

== Track listing as printed ==
1. Untitled – 0:38
2. "The Waydown" – 2:30
3. Untitled – 0:52
4. "Dirty Fingernails" – 3:20
5. "Sunspots in the House of the Late Scapegoat" – 2:42
6. "The Fruit That Ate Itself" – 3:17
7. Untitled – 0:43
8. "Summer" – 3:12
9. "Karma's Payment" – 3:28

== Japanese bonus tracks ==
1. "Blue Cadet-3, Do You Connect?" – 1:09
2. "Dukes Up" – 2:24
3. "Woodgrain" – 0:30
4. "It Always Rains On A Picnic" – 3:01
5. "5,4,3,2,1... Lipsoff" – 0:30

All of these tracks were earlier released on the Blue Cadet-3, Do You Connect? EP.

== Personnel ==
Modest Mouse

- Isaac Brock – guitar, vocals
- Eric Judy – bass
- Jeremiah Green – drums

Production

- Calvin Johnson – recording, mixing
- Steve Wold – mixing
