= Everywhere and His Nasty Parlour Tricks =

EP by Modest Mouse
- Released: September 25, 2001
- Genres: Alternative rock; experimental rock
- Length: 32:51
- Label: Epic
- Producers: Isaac Brock, Brian Deck, Phil Ek

Modest Mouse chronology
Sad Sappy Sucker (2001)	Everywhere and His Nasty Parlour Tricks (2001)	Good News for People Who Love Bad News (2004)

Professional ratings
Review scores
Source	Rating
AllMusic	3/5 stars
The A.V. Club	(positive)
Pitchfork Media	(7.8/10)
Rolling Stone	3.5/5 stars

Everywhere and His Nasty Parlour Tricks is a 2001 EP by the alternative rock band Modest Mouse. It collects the four songs from the vinyl release of the Night on the Sun EP (2000), along with unreleased tracks from the recording sessions for The Moon & Antarctica.

It was released on Epic Records on September 25, 2001, on both CD and vinyl LP.

== Track listing ==
All lyrics written by Isaac Brock; all music composed by Isaac Brock, Eric Judy, Jeremiah Green, except where noted.

1. "Willful Suspension of Disbelief" – 3:38
2. "Night on the Sun" – 7:38
3. "3 Inch Horses, Two Faced Monsters" (Brock) – 4:13
4. "You're the Good Things" – 3:33
5. "The Air" – 4:32
6. "So Much Beauty in Dirt" – 1:24
7. "Here It Comes" – 3:10
8. "I Came as a Rat (Long Walk off a Short Dock)" – 4:36

A short excerpt of "3 Inch Horses, Two Faced Monsters" was used as a sample at the end of The Moon & Antarctica's "A Different City".

== Personnel ==
Modest Mouse

- Isaac Brock – vocals, guitar; Fender Rhodes piano (6); banjo (7); producer and mixer (1, 3–8); recorder (3, 6, 7); artwork
- Jeremiah Green – percussion, drums
- Eric Judy – bass, keyboards; guitar (7)

Additional musicians

- Tyler Riley – fiddle (3)
- Tim Rutili – additional guitar (3)
- Ben Blankenship – bass (4)
- Ben Massarella – additional percussion (8)

Production

- Brian Deck – producer and mixer (1, 4, 5, 8); arranger (5)
- Phil Ek – producer (2)
- Tom Baker – mastering

== Album charts ==
Year	Album	Chart	Position
2001	Everywhere and His Nasty Parlour Tricks	Heatseekers	No. 5
2001	Everywhere and His Nasty Parlour Tricks	Billboard Top 200	No. 147
