= Dashboard (Modest Mouse song) =

- iTunes digital release

Single by Modest Mouse

from the album We Were Dead Before the Ship Even Sank
- B-side: "King Rat"
- Released: January 16, 2007
- Genre: Indie rock
- Length: 4:06
- Label: Epic
- Songwriters: Isaac Brock, Jeremiah Green, Eric Judy, Joe Plummer, Johnny Marr, Tom Peloso
- Producer: Dennis Herring

Modest Mouse singles chronology
"The World at Large" (2005)	"Dashboard" (2007)	"King Rat" (2007)

Music video
- "Dashboard" on YouTube

"Dashboard" is a song by American indie rock band Modest Mouse and is the second track on their 2007 album We Were Dead Before the Ship Even Sank. The song was released as the first single from that album and peaked at number 5 on Billboard's Modern Rock Tracks chart. It debuted and peaked at #61 in the Billboard Hot 100 in early February 2007. In late May 2007, the song was released as a single in the United Kingdom with "King Rat" as the B-side. This single coincided with the band's UK tour. This song was #87 on Rolling Stone's list of the 100 Best Songs of 2007.

Members of Modest Mouse's e-mail list were sent a link of the finished track on January 3, 2007 and the song was released to American radio stations on January 16. The lyric, "The dashboard melted but we still have the radio" references Planes, Trains and Automobiles when Del (John Candy) is telling the police officer about the car after it is burned.

== Composition ==
This song was written the first day Modest Mouse began collaborating with Johnny Marr. The guitarist later recalled to Uncut magazine: "On the first night we (Marr and Isaac Brock) just set up two amps opposite each other and just got louder and louder and improvised. I just started playing 'Dashboard,' which I'd been playing a few weeks before and forgotten about. And he instantly started improvising the lyrics, which knocked me out. To see someone produce those lyrics just off the top of his head is amazing: I've never seen it done in such a way."

== Music video ==
The music video to the song starts with several old sea captains having drinks in a pub, and one of the sea captains telling the others a story about a giant fish. Overhearing the conversation, another captain (played by Brock) sits at the table and begins to tell the story of how he lost his right hand to a giant fish while sailing in the Sargasso Sea. The video flashes back to Brock as a young captain, who hooks an enormous fish in the middle of a storm. The fish tugs Brock to a surreal island made of musical and electronic equipment, biting off his right hand in the process. The tribal inhabitants capture Brock and tend to his wounds, replacing his right hand with a microphone. The video then returns to the pub, where Brock finishes his story among jests and jokes of disbelief from his audience. The pub's bartender (Seasick Steve Wold) angrily approaches the table, verifying Brock's story by pulling up his own pant leg to reveal a guitar's neck.

The island and its natives pay homage to and take numerous stylistic cues from similar lost-at-sea stories by science fiction/fantasy author H.P. Lovecraft. The bizarre and cluttered appearance of the island may have been inspired by the science-fiction motif of the Super-Sargasso Sea. The video was directed by Mathew Cullen and Grady Hall of Motion Theory.

== Charts ==
=== Weekly charts ===
Weekly chart performance for "Dashboard"
Chart (2007)	Peak position
Canada Hot 100 (Billboard)	38
UK Singles (Official Charts)	111
US Billboard Hot 100	61
US Alternative Airplay (Billboard)	5
US Pop 100 (Billboard)	56

=== Year-end charts ===
Year-end chart performance for "Dashboard"
Chart (2007)	Position
US Alternative Songs (Billboard)	21

== Release history ==
Release dates for "Dashboard"
Region	Date
United States	January 16, 2007
United Kingdom	May 28, 2007
