= Building Nothing Out of Something =

Compilation album by Modest Mouse
- Released: January 18, 2000
- Recorded: 1995–1998
- Genre: Indie rock
- Length: 55:24
- Label: Up
- Producer: Calvin Johnson

Modest Mouse chronology
Night on the Sun (1999)	Building Nothing Out of Something (2000)	The Moon & Antarctica (2000)

Professional ratings
Review scores
Source	Rating
AllMusic	4.5/5 stars
The Austin Chronicle	3.5/5 stars
Pitchfork	8.9/10
The Rolling Stone Album Guide	3.5/5 stars
The Village Voice	A−

Building Nothing Out of Something is a compilation album released in January 2000 by American indie rock band Modest Mouse, comprising non-album tracks from various points in the band's career. All songs were originally released from 1996 to 1998. In 2015, Brock's Glacial Pace re-released the album for CD and vinyl (with some unmarked random copies containing red vinyl rather than black).

== Production ==
The songs on this album were recorded between 1995 and 1998, comprising A and B sides from singles, three tracks from Interstate 8, and one song from the vinyl version of The Lonesome Crowded West.

The track "Sleepwalking (Couples Only Dance Prom Night)" contains a melody from "Sleep Walk", a 1959 instrumental song by American rock and roll duo Santo and Johnny.

== Reception ==
In a review for Pitchfork, Brent Dicrescenzo gives the album an 8.9 out of 10. In the review, he says "Though Building Nothing Out of Something merely compiles old singles and rarities, it might be the best Modest Mouse release for newcomers' initiation, as well as instant gratification for long time fans. This batch of songs is easily their most varied. "Never Ending Math Equation" tick-tocks to a screeching turntable crescendo. "Medication" floats a slow, crystalline guitar line over muted field recordings of traffic, foghorns, and railroad bells before trotting into an acoustic coda with blithe organs. The most beautiful near-seven minutes of Modest Mouse's career rumbles throughout "Workin' on Leavin' the Livin'"-- a psychedelic testimonial to the afterlife. "Sleepwalkin'" mines the 1950s ballad of the same name, but sets the affair in an underwater chamber of whale-call guitars and aching melodies. And a suitable meltdown climaxes in the closer, "Other People's Lives," when Brock treats his guitar like solder."

== Track listing ==
All tracks are written by Modest Mouse (Isaac Brock, Eric Judy, and Jeremiah Green), except "Medication" by (Brock, Green) and "Sleepwalking", which contains a melody from Santo & Johnny's 1959 instrumental "Sleep Walk".

No.	Title	Original source	Length
1.	"Never Ending Math Equation"	A-side of single on Sub Pop (1998)	3:23
2.	"Interstate 8"	Interstate 8 EP (1996)	4:39
3.	"Broke"	A-side single on Sub Pop (1996)	3:19
4.	"Medication"	B-side of "A Life of Arctic Sounds" single on Suicide Squeeze Records (1996)	5:01
5.	"Workin' on Leavin' the Livin'"	B-side of "Never Ending Math Equation" single	6:40
6.	"All Night Diner"	Interstate 8 EP	4:44
7.	"Baby Blue Sedan"	Vinyl-only track on The Lonesome Crowded West 2LP (1997)	4:04
8.	"A Life of Arctic Sounds"	A-side of single on Suicide Squeeze Records	2:29
9.	"Sleepwalking (Couples Only Dance Prom Night)"	Interstate 8 EP	3:23
10.	"Grey Ice Water"	B-side of "Other People's Lives" single on Up Records (1998)	5:05
11.	"Whenever You Breathe Out, I Breathe In (Positive Negative)"	B-side of "Broke" single	5:18
12.	"Other People's Lives"	A-side of single on Up Records	7:10
Total length:			55:23

== Personnel ==
=== Modest Mouse ===
- Isaac Brock – Guitar, Vocals
- Eric Judy – Bass
- Jeremiah Green – Drums

=== Additional personnel ===
- Nicole Johnson – Vocals on Tracks 2, 9, & 10
- Steve Wold – Organ, Engineer, Slide Guitar on Track 4
- Dann Gallucci – Guitar on Track 8
- Joey Bullock – Drawing
- Barry Corliss – Mastering
- Brian Deck – Drawing
- Phil Ek – Engineer
- Calvin Johnson – Producer, Engineer
