= Interstate 8 (EP) =

EP by Modest Mouse
- Released: August 6, 1996
- Recorded: 1996 at Moon Music, Olympia, WA; 1995, Isaac Brock's garage, Issaquah, WA
- Genres: Indie rock, alternative rock
- Length: 27:43
- Label: Up (UP035) Glacial Pace (2015 reissue)
- Producer: Steve Wold

Modest Mouse chronology
This Is a Long Drive for Someone with Nothing to Think About (1996)	Interstate 8 (1996)	The Fruit That Ate Itself (1997)

Professional ratings
Review scores
Source	Rating
AllMusic	4/5 stars
Alternative Press	3/5 stars
The Rolling Stone Album Guide	3/5 stars

Interstate 8 is the second EP by alternative rock band Modest Mouse, released on Up Records in 1996. It contains the band's original demo, Live in Sunburst Montana, which was recorded in Isaac Brock's garage in Issaquah, Washington. "Interstate 8," "All Night Diner," and "Sleepwalking" were later included on the Building Nothing Out of Something rarities compilation released in 2000.

The studio recordings of "Tundra/Desert", "Novocain Stain", and "Beach Side Property" are available on the band's debut album This Is a Long Drive for Someone with Nothing to Think About.

== Rarity ==
Heavily sought after by collectors, this album was reissued on Isaac Brock's Glacial Pace record label in early 2015 on both CD and vinyl.

== Track listing ==
All tracks are written by Modest Mouse (Isaac Brock, Jeremiah Green, Eric Judy), except "Sleepwalking", which contains a melody from Santo & Johnny's 1959 instrumental "Sleep Walk".

No.	Title	Length
1.	"Interstate 8"	4:39
2.	"All Night Diner"	4:44
3.	"Sleepwalking (Couples Only Dance Prom Night)"	3:23
4.	"Tundra/Desert"	5:24
5.	"Edit the Sad Parts" (ends at 7:03, followed by 2:30 of silence)	9:33
6.	"Beach Side Property" (Live) (has 2:30 of silence at the start)	8:26
7.	"Buttons to Push the Buttons" (Live)	2:25
8.	"Novocain Stain" (Live)	3:29
9.	"Broke" (Live)	2:56
10.	"Whenever You Breathe Out, I Breathe In (Positive/Negative)" (Live)	4:23
11.	"Edit the Sad Parts" (Live)	7:00

Tracks 6–11 are listed only as Live in Sunburst Montana, demos recorded in Isaac Brock's garage (in Washington). "Tundra/Desert" first appeared on This Is a Long Drive for Someone with Nothing to Think About, along with new versions of "Novocain Stain" and "Beach Side Property".

== Personnel ==
- Isaac Brock – Guitar, Vocals
- Eric Judy – Bass
- Jeremiah Green – Drums

With:

- Nicole Johnson – Vocals on Track 1 & 3
