= Baron von Bullshit Rides Again =

Live album (bootleg) by Modest Mouse
- Released: April 13, 2004
- Recorded: February 14 & 15, 2004
- Venue: The Social in Orlando, FL
- Genres: Indie rock; alternative rock
- Length: 46:28
- Label: Epic

Modest Mouse chronology
Good News for People Who Love Bad News (2004)	Baron von Bullshit Rides Again (2004)	We Were Dead Before the Ship Even Sank (2007)

Professional ratings
Review scores
Source	Rating
AllMusic	3/5 stars
The Rolling Stone Album Guide	3/5 stars
Sputnikmusic	4/5 stars

Baron von Bullshit Rides Again is a live album by American rock band Modest Mouse. It was released on April 13, 2004, by Epic Records. Recorded at The Social in Orlando, Florida, during a string of shows between February 13 and February 15, 2004, the live performance was recorded by the band but not officially released; instead, only a small number of people could obtain a copy at the time by purchasing the album exclusively at Park Avenue CDs in Orlando.

In 2024, 3500 copies were printed onto vinyl for a Black Friday Record Store Day release.

== Track listing ==
All lyrics are written by Isaac Brock; all music composed by Brock, Eric Judy, and Jeremiah Green, except where noted.

No.	Title	Music	Length
1.	"3rd Planet"		5:25
2.	"Never Ending Math Equation"		3:38
3.	"Wild Packs of Family Dogs"	Brock	1:59
4.	"Broke"		3:36
5.	"Paper Thin Walls"		4:51
6.	"I Came as a Rat"		6:24
7.	"Doin' the Cockroach"		7:30
8.	"Bankrupt on Selling"		3:04
9.	"Interstate 8"		4:01
10.	"The Good Times Are Killing Me"	Brock, Judy, Dann Gallucci	5:00
Total length:			46:28

== Personnel ==
Modest Mouse

- Issac Brock – vocals, guitar; photo
- Dann Gallucci – guitar
- Eric Judy – bass, acoustic guitar
- Benjamin Weikel – drums, percussion

Production

- Chris Chandler – recording, mixing
- Houston – design
