= Night on the Sun =

EP by Modest Mouse
- Released: 6 June 1999, 2000
- Genres: Indie rock; punk rock
- Length: 23:40 (CD Release); 19:17 (Vinyl Release)
- Label: Rebel Beat Factory Up Records (US) Matador Records (UK)
- Producer: Brian Deck

Modest Mouse chronology
The Lonesome Crowded West (1997)	Night on the Sun (1999)	Building Nothing Out of Something (2000)

Alternative cover
- Cover for the 2016 reissue

Professional ratings
Review scores
Source	Rating
Pitchfork	(8.7/10)

Night on the Sun is an EP by alternative rock band Modest Mouse, released 6 June 1999 as a Japan-only album, again in 2000 as a 12" vinyl in the US and UK, and re-issued in 2016 . The tracks on the Japan's Rebel Beat Factory label were taken from The Moon & Antarctica demos that were sent to Epic Records. The four tracks on the vinyl release were included on the 2001 EP Everywhere and His Nasty Parlour Tricks. Extra percussion on "I Came As A Rat (Long Walk Off A Short Dock)" was provided by Ben Massarella and bass on "You're the Good Things" was played by Ben Blankenship.

== Reception ==
Pitchfork Media compared the EP favorably to the works of The Velvet Underground, noting that the recording contained characteristics of both Modest Mouse's earlier work and the musical direction taken after their major-label debut album, The Moon & Antarctica.

== Track listing ==
=== CD Release ===
1. "Night on the Sun" – 9:21
2. "You're the Good Things (It's Alright to Die)" – 4:23
3. "Wild Packs of Family Dogs" – 1:47
4. "Dark Center of the Universe" – 4:19
5. "Your Life" – 3:21
6. "No Title" (Jeremiah Green speaking Japanese) – 0:18

=== Vinyl Release ===
1. "Willful Suspension of Disbelief" – 3:33
2. "Night on the Sun" – 7:36
3. "I Came as a Rat (Long Walk Off a Short Dock)" – 4:36
4. "You're the Good Things" – 3:32
