= An Eraser and a Maze =

Studio album by Modest Mouse
- Released: June 5, 2026
- Genre: Indie rock
- Length: 48:54
- Label: Glacial Pace; Virgin Music Group
- Producer: Isaac Brock; Jacknife Lee; Justin Raisen; Jeremy Sherrer; Suzy Shinn

Modest Mouse chronology
The Golden Casket (2021)	An Eraser and a Maze (2026)

Singles from An Eraser and a Maze
- 1. "Look How Far..." Released: March 10, 2026; 2. "Picking Dragons' Pockets" Released: April 21, 2026; 3. "Third Side of the Moon" Released: May 12, 2026; 4. "Life's A Dream" Released: June 5, 2026

An Eraser and a Maze is the eighth studio album by American rock band Modest Mouse, released on June 5, 2026, through Glacial Pace Recordings and Virgin Music Group. The majority of the album was produced by Jacknife Lee, Suzy Shinn and frontman Isaac Brock, with further production from Justin Raisen and Jeremy Sherrer.

It is the band's first album since the death of founding drummer Jeremiah Green in 2022, and the band's first to feature new members Simon O'Connor (guitar), Damon Cox (drums) and Keith Karman (keyboards).

== Background ==
The album marks the band's first independent release after over two decades with Epic Records.

Founding Modest Mouse drummer Jeremiah Green died from cancer on December 31, 2022. Reflecting on Green's death and the future of the band, frontman Isaac Brock noted: "I didn't have a question as to whether I was continuing as Modest Mouse, because that's not an option for me. I've been doing Modest Mouse since I was essentially sixteen, seventeen years old. I didn't look at my and Jeremiah's relationship as Modest Mouse. That's just where we saw the most of each other. Jeremy and I had been friends since he was thirteen—not in a way where you necessarily take it for granted, but our friendship was more fluid than 'we're in a band together.' I didn't lose 'the drummer to Modest Mouse'. I lost Jeremy. I know that distinction might not land how it's supposed to, but they are different things."

Frontman Isaac Brock originally conceived of An Eraser and a Maze as material for his side project Ugly Casanova before expanding it into a full Modest Mouse album.

== Writing and recording ==
Regarding the recording process for An Eraser and a Maze, Brock praised the collaborative nature of the sessions, stating: "With this one, we did a lot of classic playing together until something happened that made sense. Simon or Russell would bring a part, and sometimes — like "Remember Yourself", I didn't fucking play guitar on it at all because it didn't need it. I was doing my best to show a little restraint and be like, 'No, the song's good without me fucking write [sic] a part. I'd just be writing a part to say I had one.' Instead, I acted like a fucking grown-up and was like, 'This is good without that.'"

Following Jeremiah Green's death, Brock decided to feature multiple drummers on the album, as he did not intend to "have it be like 'There's a replacement'... Damon, who stepped in for Jeremy and still is our live drummer, is on a lot of the tracks [but] I really didn't want it to feel like Jeremiah was being replaced by a person." In particular, multiple drum parts were written and recorded by former member Benjamin Weikel, who recorded Good News for People Who Love Bad News (2004) with the band and briefly rejoined for the album's 20th anniversary tour in 2024. Regarding Weikel's involvement, Brock noted: "I love fucking playing with him, [but] he had a baby, and we were getting ready to go on tour, and it just didn't make sense for him." Other drummers that feature on the album include Janet Weiss, Drew Tachine, Anthony Lopez and producer Jeremy Sherrer.

== Release and promotion ==
The album released on June 5, 2026.

The lead single, "Look How Far...", was released in March 2026, marking the band's first new music in five years and features drummer Janet Weiss, formerly of Sleater-Kinney. It was followed by "Picking Dragons' Pockets" along with the announcement of the album on April 21, 2026.

In support of the album, the band announced a North American tour and festival appearances including Bonnaroo and Outside Lands.

== Reception ==
Sydney Peterson, reviewing for Northern Transmissions, scored the album 7.2/10. Peterson praised Brock's lyrics and the album's "uplifting instrumentation and catchy refrains". Fiona Shepherd, reviewing for The List, scored the album 3/5. Shepherd wrote that the album "captures the eclecticism of their career in under 50 minutes" and singled out "Absolutely Necessary Never" as a "banger". Julia Bernicker, writing in Riff Magazine, said of the album: "the band manages to dip a toe into the muck of past, present and future without getting too bogged down in any of it."

Reviewers noted grief as a key theme across the album.

== Track listing ==
An Eraser and a Maze track listing
No.	Title	Writer(s)	Length
1.	"Picking Dragons' Pockets"	Isaac Brock; Jeremy Sherrer	4:36
2.	"Remember Yourself"	Brock; Russell Higbee; Simon O'Connor	4:11
3.	"Life's a Dream"	Brock; Higbee; Ben Massarella; O'Connor	5:31
4.	"Third Side of the Moon"	Brock; Higbee; O'Connor	4:27
5.	"Dogbed In Heaven/Give It a Skeleton"	Brock; Higbee; O’Connor	4:52
6.	"Interlude"	Brock; Higbee	0:27
7.	"I Can't Talk Right Now"	Brock; Higbee	4:14
8.	"Speak 'n Spell (Or Not)"	Brock; Damon Cox; Higbee; O'Connor	3:08
9.	"Rotten Fruit" (featuring Pkpkpkpk (Note: Alias for Justin Raisen))	Brock; Ainjel Emme; Joe Kennedy; Anthony Lopez; Justin Raisen	2:59
10.	"Knocked Down by Waves"	Brock; Keith Karman; Emme	1:15
11.	"Absolutely Necessary Never"	Brock; Higbee	3:54
12.	"Song About Nothing"	Brock; Jacknife Lee	2:14
13.	"Stoner Party"	Brock; Jeremiah Green	0:34
14.	"Look How Far..."	Brock; Higbee; O'Connor	1:55
15.	"Impossible Somedays"	Brock; Higbee; O'Connor; Benjamin Weikel	4:37
Total length:			48:54

== Personnel ==
Credits are adapted from Tidal.

=== Modest Mouse ===
- Isaac Brock – production (tracks 1–8, 10, 11, 13–15), vocals (1–5, 7–15), guitar (1, 3–5, 7–9, 11, 12, 14), bass (1, 7), keyboards (1), Mellotron (3), percussion (5, 7), mixing (6, 13), engineering (6), synthesizer (7, 15), background vocals (8); acoustic guitar, slide guitar (10); marimba (11)
- Damon Cox – drums (2, 4, 7–9); electronic drums, production assistance (2)
- Russell Higbee – bass (1–8, 11, 14, 15), Wurlitzer (2, 3, 7, 11); drum programming, production assistance (2); Mellotron (3, 4); Farfisa, glockenspiel (3); vocals (4, 5, 13), keyboards (4, 6), synthesizer (4, 11); guitar, organ, percussion (5); horn, kalimba, sampler (7)
- Keith Karman – keyboards (4, 8, 15), lap steel guitar (8), pedal steel guitar (10, 14, 15), 12-string guitar (10), Mellotron (15)
- Ben Massarella – percussion (2–5, 7, 8, 14, 15), drums (4), vocals (13)
- Simon O'Connor – guitar (2–4, 7, 8, 13–15), production assistance (2), concertina (3), acoustic guitar (4), vocals (5, 13, 15)

=== Additional musicians ===
- Jacknife Lee – keyboards (1, 3, 4, 7); acoustic guitar, vibraphone (1); guitar (3, 4, 7, 11), background vocals (3), vocals (11); bass, drums, percussion, synthesizer (12)
- Jeremy Sherrer – drums, sampler, synthesizer (1)
- Suzy Shinn – vocals (4, 5, 7), bass (7), acoustic guitar (15)
- Zach Carper – background vocals (8)
- Justin Raisen – drum programming, synthesizer, vocals, whistling (9)
- Ainjel Emme – bass, vocals, whistling (9)
- Anthony Lopez – drums, percussion (9)
- Joe Kennedy – guitar, synthesizer (9)
- Benjamin Weikel – drums (11, 15)
- Jeremiah Green – drum programming (11)
- Drew Tachine – drums (11)
- Tom Peloso – synthesizer (11)
- Brad Lauchert – vocals (13)
- Daina Roberts – vocals (13)
- Janet Weiss – drums (14)

=== Technical ===
- Jacknife Lee – production (1, 3, 4, 7, 8, 11, 12, 14), mixing (12, 14), engineering (12)
- Jeremy Sherrer – production, engineering (1)
- Suzy Shinn – production (3–5, 7, 8, 10, 11, 14, 15), production assistance (9)
- Justin Raisen – production (9)
- Zach Carper – production assistance (3, 11, 14)
- Noel Heroux – production assistance, mixing (3, 11)
- Brad Lauchert – engineering (1–5, 7–11, 13–15), mixing (9, 12)
- Christian Brannan – engineering (1–5, 7–11, 15)
- Ivan Wayman – engineering (2–5, 7, 8, 11, 14, 15)
- John McEntire – engineering (2)
- Mike Davis – engineering (3, 4)
- Charlie Cooper – engineering (5), engineering assistance (7, 11)
- Math Bishop – engineering (12), mixing (1, 2, 4, 5, 8, 10, 14)
- Zach Bloomstein – engineering (15)
- Dave Sardy – mixing (7, 15)
- Cameron Barton – mixing assistance (7, 15)
- Phil Feinman – mastering

== Charts ==
Chart performance for An Eraser and a Maze
Chart (2026)	Peak position
Scottish Albums (Official Charts)	47
UK Albums Sales (OCC)	46
UK Independent Albums (Official Charts)	20
US Billboard 200	128
US Independent Albums (Billboard)	19
US Top Rock & Alternative Albums (Billboard)	35
