= Float On (Modest Mouse song) =

2004 single by Modest Mouse

Single by Modest Mouse

from the album Good News for People Who Love Bad News
- B-side: "I've Got It All (Most)"
- Released: March 8, 2004
- Genre: Indie rock; indie pop; alternative rock
- Length: 3:28
- Label: Epic
- Songwriters: Isaac Brock; Dann Gallucci; Eric Judy; Benjamin Weikel
- Producer: Dennis Herring

Modest Mouse singles chronology
"Heart Cooks Brain" (1999)	"Float On" (2004)	"Ocean Breathes Salty" (2004)

Music video
- "Float On" on YouTube

"Float On" is a song by American rock band Modest Mouse, released on March 8, 2004, as the lead single from their fourth studio album, Good News for People Who Love Bad News (2004). The song topped the US Billboard Modern Rock Tracks chart and was nominated for a Grammy Award for Best Rock Song in 2005.

== Background and composition ==
Asked about the song in an interview with The A.V. Club, Brock said that he consciously intended to write something that felt more positive than some of his previous work:

It was a completely conscious thing. I was just kind of fed up with how bad shit had been going, and how dark everything was, with bad news coming from everywhere. Our president George W. Bush is just a fucking daily dose of bad news! Then you've got the well-intentioned scientists telling us that everything is fucked. I just want to feel good for a day.

— Isaac Brock, The A.V. Club,

The final few notes of "The World at Large" lead into the opening notes of "Float On".

In a 2026 interview with GQ magazine, Brock explained that Dann Gallucci wrote the strummed part to the song and Brock composed the lead guitar element. Brock stated "I've had guilt for years that I didn't even write that part. I get a lot of credit for that riff, but that's someone else's fucking riff, man."

== Release and reception ==
The song was released to alternative radio on March 8, 2004, and was the first Modest Mouse song to gain mainstream popularity. Nearly six months after its release, it became the band's first No. 1 hit on the US Billboard Modern Rock Tracks chart. It debuted on the Billboard Hot 100 at No. 70 and peaked at No. 68. In Australia, the song peaked at No. 94 and was ranked No. 11 on Triple J's Hottest 100 of 2004. In 2013, when Triple J created a new list of the Hottest 100 songs of the past 20 years, Float On appeared at No. 45. In July 2009, it was also voted in at No. 94 in the Triple J Hottest 100 of All Time. In December 2009, Rolling Stone named it the 39th greatest song of the 2000s. NME ranked it at No. 351 on their list of the "500 Greatest Songs of All Time" in 2014. At the 47th Annual Grammy Awards in 2005, "Float On" was nominated for Best Rock Song, losing to U2's "Vertigo".

== Music video ==
The music video is portrayed in the style of a pop-up book with the band wearing turn of the century style clothing and in an underwater scene with flotsam suits.

== Track listings ==
US 7-inch and CD single

1. "Float On" – 3:28
2. "I've Got It All (Most)" – 3:06

Australian CD single

1. "Float On" – 3:28
2. "I've Got It All (Most)" – 3:06
3. "The Good Times Are Killing Me" (alternative mix version) – 4:11
4. "Bukowski" (Congleton/Godbey remix) – 4:14

UK 7-inch single

A. "Float On"
B. "Bukowski" (Congleton/Godbey remix)

UK CD single

1. "Float On" – 3:28
2. "I've Got It All (Most)" – 3:06
3. "The Good Times Are Killing Me" (alternative mix version) – 4:11
4. "Float On" (video) – 3:32

European maxi-CD single

1. "Float On" – 3:28
2. "I've Got It All (Most)" – 3:06
3. "The Good Times Are Killing Me" (alternative mix version) – 4:11
4. "Bukowski" (Congleton/Godbey remix) – 4:14
5. "Float On" (video)

== Personnel ==
- Isaac Brock – vocals, lead guitar
- Eric Judy – bass, backing vocals
- Dann Gallucci – rhythm guitar, keyboards, drum loops, backing vocals
- Benjamin Weikel – drums, percussion

== Charts ==
=== Weekly charts ===
Chart (2004)	Peak position
Australia (ARIA)	94
Canada Rock Top 30 (Radio & Records)	24
Scottish Singles Sales (Official Charts)	48
UK Singles (Official Charts)	46
US Billboard Hot 100	68
US Adult Alternative Airplay (Billboard)	4
US Alternative Airplay (Billboard)	1
US Pop Airplay (Billboard)	32

=== Year-end charts ===
Chart (2004)	Position
US Modern Rock Tracks (Billboard)	12
US Triple-A (Billboard)	40

== Certifications ==
Region	Certification	Certified units/sales
Canada (Music Canada)	3× Platinum	240,000^{‡}
New Zealand (RMNZ)	Platinum	30,000^{‡}
United Kingdom (BPI)	Silver	200,000^{‡}
United States (RIAA)	5× Platinum	5,000,000^{‡}
^{‡} Sales+streaming figures based on certification alone.

== Release history ==
Region	Date	Format(s)	Label(s)	Ref.
United States	March 8, 2004	Alternative radio	Epic	
United States	April 26, 2004	Triple A radio	Epic	
United States	June 14, 2004	Contemporary hit radio	Epic	
United Kingdom	July 12, 2004	CD	Epic	
Australia	September 13, 2004	CD	Epic	

== Covers ==
The song was covered by Ben Lee, whose version can be heard on the soundtrack for the 2006 film John Tucker Must Die. It was also covered by Mark Kozelek and Goldspot, whose version later appeared on the television series The O.C.
