= Wood grain (disambiguation) =

Wood grain most commonly refers to the texture and appearance of the wood fibres.

Wood grain may refer to:

- Wood Grain Wheel, a single from Slim Thug
- "Woodgrain", a song by Modest Mouse on the album Blue Cadet-3, Do You Connect?
