= The Lonesome Crowded West =

Studio album by Modest Mouse
- Released: November 18, 1997
- Recorded: May 22 – June 7, 1997
- Studios: Moon Studios (Olympia); Avast Studios and Jon & Stu's (Seattle)
- Genre: Indie rock
- Length: 73:58
- Label: Up
- Producers: Calvin Johnson; Isaac Brock; Scott Swayze

Modest Mouse chronology
The Fruit That Ate Itself (1997)	The Lonesome Crowded West (1997)	Night on the Sun (1999)

Singles from The Lonesome Crowded West
- 1. "Heart Cooks Brain / Shit Luck" Released: July 2, 1999 (UK)

The Lonesome Crowded West is the second studio album by American rock band Modest Mouse, released on November 18, 1997, by Up Records. The two towers pictured on the album's cover are The Westin Seattle. Praised for its unique indie rock aesthetic and singer songwriter personality, The Lonesome Crowded West received positive reviews from critics, and appeared on several lists of the best albums of the 1990s. The album was reissued by Isaac Brock's Glacial Pace label in 2014, along with Modest Mouse's 1996 debut This Is a Long Drive for Someone with Nothing to Think About.

== Music and lyrics ==
The Lonesome Crowded West has been noted for its stylistic diversity. Blake Butler of AllMusic assessed that the album alternates between "dark and pounding thrashers" and "quiet, brooding [acoustic]" tracks. The album's third track, "Convenient Parking," is said to consist of "a dusty practice riff with broken springs," which is said to "border on the hypnotic." The album contains elements of grunge and hip-hop. The album also incorporates turntablism on the track "Heart Cooks Brain," and fiddles and banjos on "Jesus Christ Was an Only Child".

Lyrically, the album explores themes including urbanization, religion and the human condition. Adrian Spinelli of Paste assessed that the album "sees Isaac Brock lamenting the veritable concrete jungle that the world around him has become. [...] He builds the imagery of driving through the country staring out the window and observing the human condition, passing from town to town and detailing the minutiae of the lives he passes, often his own."

== Critical reception ==
Professional ratings
Review scores
Source	Rating
AllMusic	4.5/5 stars
The Austin Chronicle	4/5 stars
Chicago Tribune	3/4 stars
NME	6/10
Paste	9.5/10
Pitchfork	8.9/10 (1997); 10/10 (2014)
Rolling Stone	3.5/5 stars
The Rolling Stone Album Guide	4/5 stars
Spin	8/10
The Village Voice	A−

Blake Butler of AllMusic praised the album's innovation and stylistic diversity, saying "there's something here for everyone" and called the album "indie rock at its very best."

Pitchfork ranked The Lonesome Crowded West at number 29 in their list of the 100 greatest albums of the 1990s, and the song "Trailer Trash" reached number 63 in their list of the 200 greatest songs of the decade. Spin ranked the album at number 59 in their list of the 100 greatest albums of 1985–2005, and Entertainment Weekly included the album in their list The Indie Rock 25. The A.V. Club has described The Lonesome Crowded West as the band's breakthrough recording. Sam Hockley-Smith, in a retrospective review for Stereogum, refers to The Lonesome Crowded West as "the album that made Modest Mouse a great band instead of just a good one" and writes that the primary theme of disillusionment in Brock's lyrics is "not pretty, but it's honest, and that honesty makes it beautiful, like Modest Mouse were desperately trying — and failing — to hold onto that last bit of naiveté." In 2024, Paste Magazine ranked The Lonesome Crowded West number 300 on its list of the 300 Greatest Albums of All Time.

In June 2012, Pitchfork.tv released a forty-five-minute documentary on the album. The documentary included archival footage taken during live performances and original recording/mix sessions.

As of June 2000, according to Nielsen SoundScan, the album had sold over 60,000 copies in the United States.

In June 2026, Ben Gibbard of Seattle-based band Death Cab for Cutie said "I believe that The Lonesome Crowded West... is the greatest Northwest record ever made. I think on that record Modest Mouse, and specifically Isaac Brock, embodies what it means to be from the Northwest more than any other album.

== Track listing ==
All tracks are written by Modest Mouse (Isaac Brock, Eric Judy and Jeremiah Green, except where noted.

No.	Title	Writer(s)	Length
1.	"Teeth Like God's Shoeshine"		6:53
2.	"Heart Cooks Brain"		4:03
3.	"Convenient Parking"		4:08
4.	"Lounge (Closing Time)"		7:03
5.	"Jesus Christ Was an Only Child"	Brock	2:36
6.	"Doin' the Cockroach"		4:18
7.	"Cowboy Dan"		6:14
8.	"Trailer Trash"		5:49
9.	"Out of Gas"		2:31
10.	"Long Distance Drunk"	Brock	3:42
11.	"Shit Luck"		2:22
12.	"Truckers Atlas"		10:57
13.	"Polar Opposites"		3:29
14.	"Bankrupt on Selling"		2:53
15.	"Styrofoam Boots/It's All Nice on Ice, Alright"		6:53

=== Vinyl edition ===
The double-vinyl edition released on Up Records includes an extra track; "Baby Blue Sedan", and a slightly re-ordered track listing. Rather than having a gatefold cover to house both records, or putting both records in a single cover, the double-vinyl release was shipped in two different covers. The 2014 vinyl reissue on Glacial Pace contains the same track listing and two-cover configuration.

Side one
No.	Title	Length
1.	"Teeth Like God's Shoeshine"	6:53
2.	"Heart Cooks Brain"	4:03
3.	"Convenient Parking"	4:08
4.	"Baby Blue Sedan"	4:04

Side two
No.	Title	Length
1.	"Jesus Christ Was an Only Child"	2:36
2.	"Doin' the Cockroach"	4:19
3.	"Cowboy Dan"	6:15
4.	"Trailer Trash"	5:50

Side three
No.	Title	Length
1.	"Out of Gas"	2:31
2.	"Long Distance Drunk"	3:43
3.	"Shit Luck"	2:23
4.	"Truckers Atlas"	10:58

Side four
No.	Title	Length
1.	"Polar Opposites"	3:30
2.	"Bankrupt on Selling"	2:54
3.	"Lounge (Closing Time)"	7:04
4.	"Styrofoam Boots/It's All Nice on Ice, Alright"	6:53

== Personnel ==
Modest Mouse

- Isaac Brock – guitars, vocals
- Jeremiah Green – drums
- Eric Judy – bass

Additional personnel

- DJ K.O. – phonogram player, k-ep 63 on "Heart Cooks Brain"
- Dann Gallucci – guitar on "Trailer Trash" and "Bankrupt on Selling"
- Tyler Reilly – fiddle on "Jesus Christ Was an Only Child"
- Scott Swayze – guitar on "Convenient Parking" and "Lounge (Closing Time)"
- Nicole Johnson – vocals
- Chris Setton – vocals on "Lounge (Closing Time)"
- Brian Weber – bartender

Production credits

- Produced by Calvin Johnson, with Isaac Brock and Scott Swayze
- Engineered by Scott Swayze
- Recorded at Moon Music, except "Teeth Like God's Shoeshine," "Doin' the Cockroach," and "Cowboy Dan", recorded by Phil Ek at Avast and Jon & Stu's
- Snow photos by Pat Graham
- Other photos by I. Brock
- Cover design by Pat Castaldo
