= The Golden Casket =

Studio album by Modest Mouse
- Released: June 25, 2021
- Recorded: 2020
- Genres: Indie rock, alternative rock, neo-psychedelia, post-punk revival, indietronica, indie pop
- Length: 50:22
- Label: Epic
- Producers: Dave Sardy; Jacknife Lee; Andrew Weiss

Modest Mouse chronology
Strangers to Ourselves (2015)	The Golden Casket (2021)	An Eraser and a Maze (2026)

Singles from The Golden Casket
- 1. "We Are Between" Released: May 5, 2021; 2. "Leave a Light On" Released: May 24, 2021; 3. "The Sun Hasn't Left" Released: June 18, 2021

The Golden Casket is the seventh studio album by the American alternative rock band Modest Mouse, released on June 25, 2021, on Epic Records. Produced by Dave Sardy and Jacknife Lee, the album was preceded by the singles, "We Are Between", "Leave a Light On" and "The Sun Hasn't Left".

This album is the last to feature founding drummer Jeremiah Green, who died the following year in 2022, and is the last to feature band members Tom Peloso, Jim Fairchild, and Lisa Molinaro.

== Critical reception ==
Professional ratings
Aggregate scores
Source	Rating
Metacritic	78/100
Review scores
Source	Rating
NME	5/5 stars
Paste	6.1/10
Pitchfork	7.3/10
PopMatters	9/10
Rolling Stone	2.5/5 stars
Slant Magazine	4/5 stars
Sputnikmusic	4.0/5
Tom Hull – on the Web	B+
Under the Radar	8.5/10 stars

The Golden Casket received generally positive reviews from critics. At Metacritic, which assigns a normalized rating out of 100 to reviews from critics, the album received an average score of 78, which indicates "generally favorable reviews," based on 12 reviews. Reviewing for Rolling Stone, Kory Grow characterized the album as "textured and messy as humanly possible," writing: "Like many Modest Mouse records, The Golden Casket sounds cluttered." Conversely, Pitchfork's Evan Rytlewskia called the album a "procession of pinging, clanging, reverberating tactile pleasures". NME's Jordan Bassett gave the album five stars, labeling it a "masterful psychedelic patchwork." He concluded with a quote from a fan: "Brought me comfort at 13… Bringing me comfort at 31. My goodness does life go by quick."

== Track listing ==
Songwriters adapted from the album's liner notes ASCAP.

The Golden Casket track listing
No.	Title	Writer(s)	Length
1.	"Fuck Your Acid Trip"	Isaac Brock, Dave Sardy, Jeremiah Green, Russell Higbee	3:11
2.	"We Are Between"	Brock, Higbee, Green, Tom Peloso, Jim Fairchild	3:52
3.	"We're Lucky"	Brock, Green, Higbee, Peloso, Fairchild	2:44
4.	"Walking & Running"	Brock, Green, Eric Judy, Jacknife Lee	3:01
5.	"Wooden Soldiers"	Brock, Sardy, Green, Higbee, Ben Massarella, Lisa Molinaro	5:55
6.	"Transmitting Receiving"	Brock, Sardy, Green, Higbee, Massarella, Peloso	5:40
7.	"The Sun Hasn't Left"	Brock, Sardy, Green, Higbee, Lee	4:23
8.	"Lace Your Shoes"	Brock, Sardy, Green, Higbee, Massarella	5:25
9.	"Never Fuck a Spider on the Fly"	Brock, Sardy, Green, Higbee, Massarella, Peloso	4:56
10.	"Leave a Light On"	Brock, Green, Higbee, Massarella	4:18
11.	"Japanese Trees"	Brock, Green, Higbee, Peloso	3:05
12.	"Back to the Middle"	Brock, Green	3:52
Total length:			50:22

== Personnel ==
All credits for The Golden Casket adapted from the album's liner notes.

Modest Mouse

- Isaac Brock – vocals (1–8, 10–12); electric guitar (1–6, 8–11); finger snaps (1, 5); bass synth (1); mouth percussion (4); modular synth (5, 8, 10); soft drink percussion, banjo, vibraslap, spacephone, melodica (5); tom percussion, bass guitar effects, Speak and Spell, electronic loops (6); verse bass guitar (7, 8); guitars (7, 12); marimba, synths, drum machine (7); ebo guitar, kalimba (8); main synth, wasp synth (9); bass guitar, 101 synth (10); creative direction
- Russell Higbee – bass (1, 4–9, 11, 12); arp synth (1, 10); electric guitar (2, 3, 7, 10); Mini Korg (3); Farfisa (3, 5); verse and chorus synth (4); Solina (10); synth, drum programming (11)
- Jeremiah Green – drums (1, 3–12); finger snaps (1); drum machine (5, 9); tom percussion (6)
- Lisa Molinaro – vocals (4, 5, 7), viola (5, 12), background vocals (11)
- Ben Massarella – shaker (1, 4, 5, 7–11), toms (1, 6, 8); tambourine (1, 8); claves, cowbell, handbells, xylophone, bamblong (1); paper bags filled with wood (2, 3); drum machine (3); percussion (4, 10); stick bundles (5); cymbals, spare change (8); tambourine hits (9); electronic drums (10, 11); metallic percussion, bongos, water drum (10)
- Tom Peloso – Wurlitzer (1, 6); bass, horn (3); chorus synth (4), lap-steel guitar (6), melody piano (6); Nord electric piano (9); Fun Machine, piano, Mini Korg, Crumar (11)
- Jim Fairchild – guitar (3)

Additional musicians

- D. Sardy – production (1–11); acoustic guitar (1, 5, 6, 9, 11), electric guitar (2, 6, 8), organ (2, 5), synthesizer (2, 5, 8–11), chimes (2), keyboards (4), piano (5, 6, 8); shaker, tambourine (6, 9); drums (6), bass guitar (7, 8, 10), vocals (7, 10, 11), guitar (7), programmed timpani (11); mixing (1, 3, 5, 6, 8, 9, 11)
- Jacknife Lee – production mixing, engineering, bass guitar, drums, guitar, keyboards, vocals (2, 4, 7, 10); percussion, synthesizer (4, 7, 10); background vocals, piano (4)
- Jordan Katz – horn (7)
- Ryan Baldoz – cheers (12)
- Eric Judy – songwriting (4)

Technical personnel

- Andrew Weiss – production (12)
- Stephen Marcussen – mastering
- Stewart Whitmore – mastering
- John McEntire – mixing, engineering (12)
- Cameron Barton – engineering (1–11)
- Jim Monti – engineering (1–11)
- Jeremy Sherrer – engineering (12)
- Matt Bishop – editor (2–4, 7, 10)
- Dylan Odbert – art direction, design

== Charts ==
Chart performance for The Golden Casket
Chart (2021)	Peak position
US Billboard 200	87
US Top Alternative Albums (Billboard)	7
US Top Rock Albums (Billboard)	12
