= Speak in Tongues =

Concert venue and art gallery in Cleveland, Ohio, 1994-2001

- Interactive map of Speak in Tongues
- Address: 4311 Lorain Avenue; Cleveland, Ohio
- Location: United States
- Coordinates: 41°28′45″N 81°42′57″W
- Type: Music venue
- Event: Independent music

Construction
- Opened: October 7, 1994
- Closed: December 31, 2001

Website
- speakintongues.com

Speak in Tongues was a collectively-operated DIY creative space and concert venue located at 4311 Lorain Avenue in Cleveland, Ohio from October 7, 1994, until December 31, 2001.

== History ==
Speak in Tongues was started in 1994 when musician Dave Petrovich and his friend Shelby Bell leased the first floor (and basement) of 4311 Lorain Avenue from a local communist political organization as "a space to host events and parties and art shows and performances - whatever might come to mind". During its existence, dozens of people lived at Speak In Tongues. The residents, along with others in the local music scene, booked events and formed a de facto collective, eventually paying dues for the right to participate in programming. Speak in Tongues was forced to close on New Year's Eve 2001 after being evicted when a new owner acquired the building.

== Performances ==
Speak in Tongues never charged more than $5 for a show. Notable artists who played at Speak in Tongues include Modest Mouse, Tortoise, Low, Lifter Puller, Lightning Bolt, Godspeed You! Black Emperor, His Hero is Gone, Mountain Goats, Neutral Milk Hotel, and !!!. Modest Mouse played at Speak in Tongues several times early in their career, earning the title of "unofficial house band," and Lifter Puller's final ill-fated tour included a stop at Speak in Tongues. Nine Shocks Terror, the Unknown, and Brian Straw played the final show on December 31, 2001.
