= Good News for People Who Love Bad News =

Studio album by Modest Mouse
- Released: April 6, 2004
- Studios: Sweet Tea (Oxford, Mississippi); Easley-McCain (Memphis, Tennessee)
- Genres: Alternative rock; indie rock; indie pop; alt-country; post-punk revival
- Length: 48:50
- Label: Epic
- Producer: Dennis Herring

Modest Mouse chronology
| Everywhere and His Nasty Parlour Tricks (2001) | Good News for People Who Love Bad News (2004) | Baron von Bullshit Rides Again (2004) |

Singles from Good News for People Who Love Bad News
- 1. "Float On" Released: March 8, 2004; 2. "Ocean Breathes Salty" Released: August 23, 2004; 3. "The World at Large" Released: February 22, 2005

Good News for People Who Love Bad News is the fourth studio album by American rock band Modest Mouse, released on April 6, 2004, by Epic Records. Founding member and drummer Jeremiah Green did not perform on this album due to his temporary absence from the band, making it the only Modest Mouse release during his lifetime that he did not appear on.

Good News for People Who Love Bad News was nominated for the Grammy Award for Best Alternative Music Album in 2005. It was certified 2× platinum by the RIAA in March 2024, and had sold over 1.5 million copies in the United States by 2006. Three singles were released from the album: "Float On", "Ocean Breathes Salty", and "The World at Large".

== Reception ==
Professional ratings
Aggregate scores
| Source | Rating |
|---|---|
| Metacritic | 83/100 |
Review scores
| Source | Rating |
| AllMusic | 4.5/5 stars |
| Entertainment Weekly | B+ |
| The Guardian | 3/5 stars |
| Mojo | 4/5 stars |
| NME | 9/10 |
| Pitchfork | 7.9/10 |
| Q | 4/5 stars |
| Rolling Stone | 4/5 stars |
| Spin | A |
| The Village Voice | A− |

Good News for People Who Love Bad News was released to widespread acclaim from music critics. At Metacritic, which assigns a normalized rating out of 100 to reviews from mainstream critics, the album received an average score of 83, indicating "universal acclaim". Tiny Mix Tapes gave the album all five stars and said that "Ultimately, what makes Good News so successful is that it retains the melancholy mood of past works, while at the same time adding depth and maturity." Spin gave it an A and said it was "Half expansive, burnished radio-rock, half swampy Delta hoodoo-hollerin' that reeks of Brock's Southern sojourn." Filter gave it a score of 92% and said that it would soon be "one of the best albums of 2004". NME gave it a score of nine out of ten and called it "A real-life pop record. Well, not pop in the Girls Aloud sense of the word obviously, more in the drop-dead, fuzz-box brilliant 'Here Comes Your Man' sense." Billboard gave it a favorable review and called it "a daring yet accessible disc". Kelefa Sanneh of The New York Times also gave it a favorable review and called it "the best Modest Mouse album yet."

Mojo gave the album four stars out of five and said that "Moments of simple, exultant joy are plentiful." Q also gave it four stars out of five and said that the album consisted of "45 bonkers minutes". Alternative Press likewise gave it four stars out of five and stated, "If Good News... isn't the pillar-like masterpiece Modest Mouse fans have waited years for, it's proof that things haven't completely fallen apart." Dusted gave it a favorable review and called it "a more varied album than The Moon and Antarctica (which did seem to have only one speed), and with the return of original member Dan Gallucci, Brock appears to have revived the heavy lead guitar playing of their early work." The A.V. Club also gave it a favorable review and stated, "The songs still rely on Brock's echoing guitar patterns and Mobius-strip lyrics, delivered in the voice of a harried, hip-hop-inflected square-dance caller, but though the vehicle stays the same, the scenery outside the window changes considerably."

Neumu.net gave it a score of seven out of ten and said, "While the album is not as cohesive a vision, many of its songs are more focused." The Austin Chronicle gave it three-and-a-half stars out of five and said, "No bad news here, just more headline-making from an innovative, ever-maturing group of musicians." Yahoo! Music UK gave it a score of seven out of ten and said that "At these transcending moments, 'Good News...' is elevated into excellence. But overall, there is too much Mouse that bores and not enough Mouse that roars." Almost Cool gave it a score of 6.75 out of ten and said that "Probably the biggest complaint could be that the group has tightened up their sound even more on this release, leaving behind even more of the roughshod qualities that made their earlier discs blister with such energy."

Other reviews are very average or mixed: The Guardian gave the album three stars out of five and called it "A useful addition to a genre that prizes brain over brawn." Blender also gave it three stars out of five and said that "[Brock is] adept at wringing out emotion while straddling sentimentality, but too often here, gauche studio affectations make his sap sound plain cheap." Nude as the News gave it a score of six out of ten and stated, "A lot of major label-imposed ideas, like rhythm guitar and a heartbreakingly conventional new bass sound, combine to utterly ruin the record's first half. If you can make it through to News' innards, however, an EP's worth of something like better-recorded, more thought-out Lonesome Crowded West material awaits." Stylus Magazine gave the album a C and said of Modest Mouse, "Gone is pretty much everything they’ve learned in the last eight years or so, ditching all the progress they’ve made in favor of just making another Modest Mouse record. The results, needless to say, are disappointing." Uncut gave it two stars out of five and said that "There are some pleasantly elaborate, wayward songs here... Forays into funk and Tom Waits' scrapyard are cringe-inducing, though."

== Track listing ==
All tracks are written by Isaac Brock, Dann Gallucci, and Eric Judy, except where noted.

| No. | Title | Music | Length |
|---|---|---|---|
| 1. | "Horn Intro" | Brock | 0:09 |
| 2. | "The World at Large" | | 4:32 |
| 3. | "Float On" | | 3:28 |
| 4. | "Ocean Breathes Salty" | | 3:49 |
| 5. | "Dig Your Grave" | Brock | 0:13 |
| 6. | "Bury Me with It" | | 3:49 |
| 7. | "Dance Hall" | | 2:57 |
| 8. | "Bukowski" | Brock, Judy, Gallucci, Tom Peloso | 4:14 |
| 9. | "This Devil's Workday" | | 2:19 |
| 10. | "The View" | | 4:13 |
| 11. | "Satin in a Coffin" | Brock, Judy, Gallucci, Peloso | 2:35 |
| 12. | "Interlude (Milo)" | Judy, Gallucci, Peloso | 0:58 |
| 13. | "Blame It on the Tetons" | Brock, Judy, Gallucci, Peloso | 5:25 |
| 14. | "Black Cadillacs" | | 2:43 |
| 15. | "One Chance" | | 3:04 |
| 16. | "The Good Times Are Killing Me" | | 4:16 |
| Total length: | | | 48:50 |

Vinyl edition bonus track
| No. | Title | Music | Length |
|---|---|---|---|
| 17. | "I've Got It All (Most)" | Brock, Judy, Jeremiah Green | 3:10 |
| Total length: | | | 52:00 |

=== Notes ===
The B-side "I've Got It All (Most)" of "Float On" is included between "Bury Me with It" and "Dance Hall" (Track 7) on the dualdisc edition of the album, and as the last track (Track 17) on the vinyl release. Japanese edition also have this track as track 7 and also "The Good Times Are Killing Me (Alternate Mix Version)" as last track.

== Personnel ==
All credits for Good News for People Who Love Bad News are adapted from the album's liner notes.

Modest Mouse

- Isaac Brock – vocals (2–11, 13–17); Rhodes, whistle, piano (2); guitar (3, 4, 6, 7, 10–15); ukulele (5); banjo (8, 9, 11); Hendx 3000 (10); freak beak (14); baritone guitar (16); artwork
- Eric Judy – acoustic guitar (2, 8, 16); percussion (2); bass (3, 4, 6, 7, 10, 13–15); backup vocals (3, 16); Mellotron (3); pump organ (11, 12); tin whistle (16); guitar, piano (17)
- Dann Gallucci – guitar (2–4, 6–8, 10–12, 14, 15); Mellotron (2, 10); timpani, percussion (2); backup vocals (3, 16); drum loops (3, 6); keyboards (4, 6, 7, 10); glockenspiel (7); piano (7, 13, 14); pump organ (16); bass (17)
- Benjamin Weikel – drums (2–4, 6–8, 10, 11, 13–15, 17)

Additional musicians

- The Dirty Dozen Brass Band – horns (1, 9)
- The Rising Star Fife and Drum Band – additional drums (6), drums (16)
- Tom Peloso – standup bass (8, 11, 12), fiddle (13)
- Dennis Herring – accordion (8)
- Milo Chaska Judy – vocals (12)
- The Flaming Lips – additional instrumentation (16)

Production

- Dennis Herring – producer, mixer
- Jacquire King – recorder, mixer
- Clay Jones – recording
- Dawn Palladino – 2nd engineer
- Nathan Provence – 2nd engineer
- Sean Macke – 2nd engineer
- Stuart Sikes – additional engineering
- The Flaming Lips – mixing (16)
- Dave Fridmann – mixing (16)
- Howie Weinberg – mastering
- Houston – design, artwork
- David Emmite – photography
- Courtney Clingan – photography

== Charts ==
=== Weekly charts ===
| Chart (2004) | Peak position |
|---|---|
| Australian Hitseekers Albums (ARIA) | 8 |
| Canadian Albums (Nielsen SoundScan) | 52 |
| Scottish Albums (Official Charts) | 37 |
| UK Albums (Official Charts) | 40 |
| US Billboard 200 | 18 |

| Chart (2024) | Peak position |
|---|---|
| US Indie Store Album Sales (Billboard) | 9 |

=== Year-end charts ===
| Chart (2004) | Position |
|---|---|
| US Billboard 200 | 64 |
| Chart (2005) | Position |
| US Billboard 200 | 184 |

== Certifications ==
| Region | Certification | Certified units/sales |
|---|---|---|
| Canada (Music Canada) | Platinum | 100,000^{‡} |
| United Kingdom (BPI) | Silver | 60,000^{*} |
| United States (RIAA) | 2× Platinum | 2,000,000^{‡} |
^{*} Sales figures based on certification alone.^{‡} Sales+streaming figures based on certification alone.
