= This Is a Long Drive for Someone with Nothing to Think About =

Studio album by Modest Mouse
- Released: April 16, 1996
- Recorded: October–November 1995
- Studio: Moon Studios (Olympia, Washington)
- Genre: Indie rock
- Length: 74:03 (Standard); 86:10 (LP)
- Label: Up
- Producer: Steve Wold

Modest Mouse chronology
Blue Cadet-3, Do You Connect? (1994)	This Is a Long Drive for Someone with Nothing to Think About (1996)	Interstate 8 (1996)

This Is a Long Drive for Someone with Nothing to Think About is the debut studio album by American rock band Modest Mouse. It was released on April 16, 1996, through Up Records.

== Music and lyrics ==
This Is a Long Drive for Someone with Nothing to Think About is an indie rock album that incorporates elements of punk rock, midwest emo, grunge, and surf rock. Ryan Schreiber of Pitchfork remarked that Modest Mouse show influence from Pixies and Jane's Addiction with certain elements on the album also drawing comparisons to Built to Spill and Pink Floyd.

Brandon Gentry of AllMusic explains that the album's tracks alternate between "slow, brooding numbers" and "thrashing guitar workouts." The album's instrumentation incorporates mandolin, slide guitar, and cello to augment the band's traditional indie rock configuration.

Lyrically, many of the album's tracks focus on traveling by automobile and the loneliness associated with rural life, which Gentry delineated as "emotional and geographic isolation." According to Ryan Schreiber of Pitchfork, the album's lyrics "appear completely stream-of-consciousness."

== Critical reception ==
Professional ratings
Review scores
Source	Rating
AllMusic	4/5 stars
Christgau's Consumer Guide	A−
Pitchfork	6.8/10 (1996); 8.5/10 (2014)
The Rolling Stone Album Guide	3.5/5 stars

The Albuquerque Tribune called the album "intricate, brainy pop sneaking back into old-time ballads, honky-tonk slide and folk pluck." Robert Christgau remarked that Modest Mouse are "so insularly indie they're incomprehensible to anyone who hasn't been softened up by Wowee Zowee and the Meat Puppets". Brandon Gentry of AllMusic wrote: "In general, This Is a Long Drive for Someone with Nothing to Think About is a fine album, and Modest Mouse distinguishes itself here with songs whose meanings are simultaneously universal and painfully personal." Ryan Schreiber of Pitchfork wrote: "The only problem with this record is that it's impossible to get all the way through it because it's over 70 minutes long. And the vinyl version actually has more songs. There are few bands who can pull that off and honestly, Modest Mouse is not one of 'em. But I guess if they've got the studio time, a little extra music never hurt anybody."

== Track listing ==
All lyrics are written by Isaac Brock; all music is composed by Modest Mouse (Brock, Jeremiah Green, Eric Judy).

No.	Title	Length
1.	"Dramamine"	5:42
2.	"Breakthrough"	4:06
3.	"Custom Concern"	4:28
4.	"Might"	1:30
5.	"Lounge"	6:34
6.	"Beach Side Property"	7:00
7.	"Ionizes & Atomizes"	4:21
8.	"Head South"	4:22
9.	"Dog Paddle"	2:02
10.	"Novocain Stain"	3:42
11.	"Tundra/Desert"	5:24
12.	"Ohio"	6:00
13.	"Exit Does Not Exist"	4:57
14.	"Talking Shit About a Pretty Sunset"	5:50
15.	"Make Everyone Happy/Mechanical Birds"	6:04
16.	"Space Travel Is Boring"	1:53
Total length:		74:03

=== Vinyl edition ===
Side one
No.	Title	Length
1.	"Dramamine"	5:42
2.	"Breakthrough"	4:06
3.	"Custom Concern"	4:28
4.	"Might"	1:30
5.	"Lounge"	6:34

Side two
No.	Title	Length
1.	"Beach Side Property"	7:00
2.	"Ionizes & Atomizes"	4:21
3.	"Head South"	4:22
4.	"Dog Paddle"	2:02
5.	"Novocain Stain"	3:42

Side three
No.	Title	Length
1.	"Tundra/Desert"	5:24
2.	"Ohio"	6:00
3.	"Exit Does Not Exist"	4:57
4.	"Talking Shit About A Pretty Sunset"	5:50

Side four
No.	Title	Length
1.	"Make Everyone Happy/Mechanical Birds"	6:04
2.	"Space Travel Is Boring"	1:53
3.	"Edit the Sad Parts"	7:04
4.	"A Manic Depressive Named Laughing Boy"	5:03
Total length:		86:10

== Personnel ==
Modest Mouse

- Isaac Brock – guitar and vocals (drums on "Dog Paddle")
- Jeremiah Green – drums (bass on "Dog Paddle")
- Eric Judy – bass (guitar on "Dog Paddle")

Additional musicians

- Steve Wold – slide guitar, mandolin, guitar, backup vocals
- Brent Arnold – cello
- Nicole Johnson – vocals on "Custom Concern", "Ionizes & Atomizes", and "Head South"
- Calvin Johnson – extra vocals on "Head South"

Others

- Produced by Steve Wold
- Engineered by Scott Swayze & Steve Wold
- Photography by Isaac Brock
