= Blue Cadet-3, Do You Connect? =

EP by Modest Mouse
- Released: 1994
- Recorded: 1994
- Studios: Dub Narcotic Studio, Olympia, WA (tracks 1, 2, & 4); the Dial-A-Song Answering thing (tracks 3 & 5)
- Length: 7:34
- Label: K Records IPU58
- Producer: Modest Mouse

Modest Mouse chronology
Blue Cadet-3, Do You Connect? (1994)	This Is a Long Drive for Someone with Nothing to Think About (1996)

Blue Cadet-3, Do You Connect? is Modest Mouse's first EP release. It was released by K Records in 1994. Approximately 300 copies were originally pressed. All of the tracks on this release are available on their 2001 release Sad Sappy Sucker.

== Track listing ==
Songwriters adapted from ASCAP.

No.	Title	Writer(s)	Length
1.	"Blue Cadet-3, Do You Connect?"	Isaac Brock	1:09
2.	"Dukes Up"	Brock, Jeremiah Green, Dann Gallucci	2:24
3.	"Woodgrain"	Brock	0:30
4.	"It Always Rains on a Picnic"	Brock, Green, Gallucci	3:01
5.	"5,4,3,2,1… Lisp Off"	Brock	0:30
Total length:			7:34

== Personnel ==
All credits for Blue Cadet-3, Do You Connect? adapted from the EP's liner notes.

Modest Mouse

- Isaac Brock – guitar, vocals; recording (1, 3, 5)
- Jeremiah Green – drums
- John Wickhart – bass
- Dann Gallucci – guitar

Additional personnel

- Calvin Johnson – recording (2, 4)
