= Sad Sappy Sucker =

Studio album by Modest Mouse
- Released: April 24, 2001
- Recorded: November 12, 1994 (1-11, 13); 1994 – 1995 (12, 14-24)
- Studios: Dub Narcotic Studio, Olympa, WA (1-11, 13); Dial-A-Song (12, 14-24)
- Genre: Indie rock
- Length: 34:34
- Labels: K Records, Glacial Pace (2010 reissue)
- Producer: Calvin Johnson

Modest Mouse chronology
The Moon & Antarctica (2000)	Sad Sappy Sucker (2001)	Everywhere and His Nasty Parlour Tricks (2001)

Professional ratings
Aggregate scores
Source	Rating
Metacritic	(55/100)
Review scores
Source	Rating
AllMusic	3/5 stars
Pitchfork	7.0/10 (2001); 7.2/10 (2010)
PopMatters	(Reissue)
The Rolling Stone Album Guide	3/5 stars

Sad Sappy Sucker (or by the full title on its cover art Sad Sappy Sucker Chokin on a Mouthful of Lost Thoughts) is a previously unreleased studio album by the alternative rock band Modest Mouse. Originally slated to be Modest Mouse's debut album in 1994, Sad Sappy Sucker was shelved for several years until its eventual release in 2001, following the popularity of the band's third album The Moon & Antarctica (2000).

Several songs were recorded at Olympia, Washington's Dub Narcotic Studios by Beat Happening frontman Calvin Johnson. The record was officially released by Johnson's label K Records on April 24, 2001, available in both Compact Disc and vinyl LP, and containing nine additional tracks added to the original track listing of 15 songs.

Sad Sappy Sucker album is the only Modest Mouse release to feature the short-lived, early four-piece line-up of the band, featuring frontman Isaac Brock, guitarist Dann Gallucci, bass guitarist John Wickhart and drummer Jeremiah Green.

== Critical reception ==
Sad Sappy Sucker was met with "mixed or average" reviews from critics. Metacritic, gave this release a score of 55 out of 100, based on 7 reviews.

In a review for Pitchfork, Spencer Owen gave the album a 7 out of 10 on release, but after a reissue gave it a 7.2. PopMatters said that "taken on its own merits, Sad Sappy Sucker is pretty good, but the out-and-out strangeness of it all and the fact that it doesn’t hold together as a real album may throw off the uninitiated (and who can blame them?)." Stereogum declared it the worst Modest Mouse album, stating "the album is as grating and undercooked as indie rock debuts come, full of indulgent studio experiments, half-assed sketches, and tunes that sound like a generic sadcore band's demo cassette in high-speed dub mode....Sad Sappy Sucker asks the question: 'How many Built To Spills do we need?'"

== Track listing ==
The first 15 tracks make up the original album Sad Sappy Sucker. Tracks 16–24 come from Isaac Brock's answering machine — he originally had a "Call to Dial a Song" service, similar to They Might Be Giants' Dial-A-Song.

All tracks are written by Isaac Brock, except where noted.

No.	Title	Writer(s)	Length
1.	"Worms vs. Birds"	Brock, Jeremiah Green, Dann Gallucci	2:13
2.	"Four Fingered Fisherman"	Brock, Green, Gallucci	2:27
3.	"Wagon Ride Return"		0:48
4.	"Classy Plastic Lumber"	Brock, Green, Gallucci	2:03
5.	"From Point A to Point B (∞)"		2:56
6.	"Path of Least Resistance"		0:28
7.	"It Always Rains on a Picnic"	Brock, Green, Gallucci	3:01
8.	"Dukes Up"	Brock, Green, Gallucci	2:24
9.	"Think Long"		1:09
10.	"Every Penny Fed Car"	Brock, Green, Gallucci	3:07
11.	"Mice Eat Cheese"		2:26
12.	"Race Car Grin You Ain't No Landmark"		1:13
13.	"Red Hand Case"	Brock, Green, Gallucci	2:37
14.	"Secret Agent X-9"		1:12
15.	"Blue Cadet-3, Do You Connect?"		1:09
Total length:			29:13

Bonus Tracks

No.	Title	Writer(s)	Length
16.	"Call to Dial-a-Song"	Spencer Moody	0:31
17.	"5-4-3-2-1 Lisp Off"		0:30
18.	"Woodgrain"		0:30
19.	"BMX Crash"		0:28
20.	"Sucker Bet"		1:19
21.	"Black Blood & Old Newagers"		0:29
22.	"SWY"		0:29
23.	"Australopithecus"		0:29
24.	"Sin Gun Chaser"		0:27
Total length:			34:34

== Personnel ==
Credits for Sad Sappy Sucker are adapted from the album's liner notes and Bandcamp.

Modest Mouse

- Isaac Brock – vocals (all); guitar, other instruments (1-11, 13); recording (12, 14, 15, 17-24); cover artwork
- Dann Gallucci – guitar (1-11, 13)
- John Wickhart – bass guitar (1-11, 13)
- Jeremiah Green – drums (1-11, 13)

Additional personnel

- Calvin Johnson – recording (1-11, 13)
- Spencer Moody – reportedly the only caller to ever leave a voicemail message on the Dial-A-Song service in 1994, heard on "Call to Dial-a-Song"
- Thomas Campbell – doodles
- Little Lord Fauntleroy – pantaloons

== Charts ==
Chart (2001)	Peak position
US Independent Albums (Billboard)	21
US Heatseekers Albums (Billboard)	26
