= Modest Mouse =

American rock band

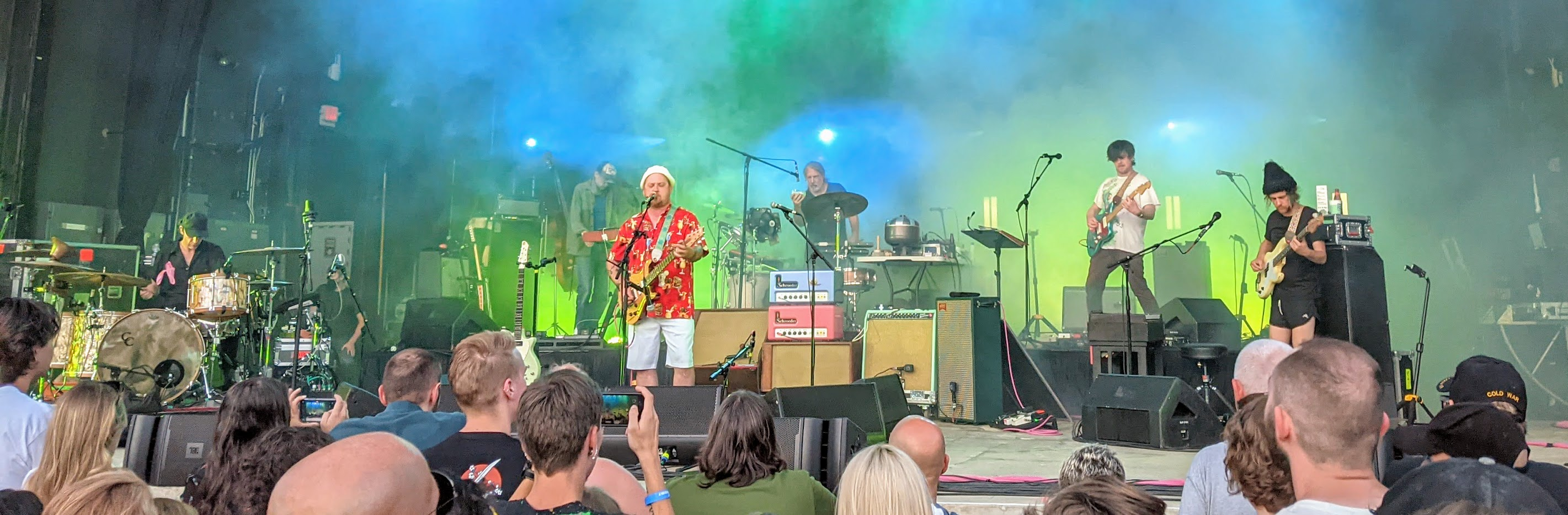
- Modest Mouse performing in August 2021. Left to right: Green, Peloso, Brock, Massarella, O'Connor, Higbee

Background information
- Origin: Issaquah, Washington, U.S.
- Genres: Indie rock; alternative rock; post punk revival; punk rock; lo-fi; emo (early)
- Works: Modest Mouse discography
- Years active: 1993–present
- Labels: Epic; Up; K; Matador; Glacial
- Spinoffs: Ugly Casanova
- Members: Isaac Brock; Russell Higbee; Ben Massarella; Damon Cox; Keith Karman; Simon O'Connor
- Past members: Jeremiah Green; Eric Judy; Joe Plummer; Dann Gallucci; Benjamin Weikel; Tom Peloso; Jim Fairchild; Lisa Molinaro; John Wickhart; Johnny Marr
- Website: modestmouse.com

Modest Mouse is an American indie rock band formed in 1993 in Issaquah, Washington, and currently based in Portland, Oregon. The founding members were lead singer/guitarist Isaac Brock, drummer Jeremiah Green and bassist Eric Judy. They achieved critical acclaim for their albums The Lonesome Crowded West (1997) and The Moon & Antarctica (2000) and found mainstream success with the release of Good News for People Who Love Bad News (2004) and its singles "Float On" and "Ocean Breathes Salty". The following album We Were Dead Before the Ship Even Sank (2007) brought additional successes with the single "Dashboard".

The group has seen many line up changes with Brock remaining the sole consistent member following Judy's departure in 2012 and Green's death in 2022. Notable former members include guitarist and multi-instrumentalist Dann Gallucci, guitarist Johnny Marr (of the Smiths fame), drummer and multi-instrumentalist Joe Plummer, multi-instrumentalist Tom Peloso and guitarist Jim Fairchild. The band's sixth album, Strangers to Ourselves, was released in 2015 and their seventh, The Golden Casket, in 2021. Their eighth and latest album, An Eraser and a Maze, was released in June 2026.

== History ==
=== Formation and early years: 1992–1999 ===
When Isaac Brock was a teenager, he was employed at a local family video store just outside Seattle, where he met bassist Eric Judy. Brock and Judy later discovered drummer Jeremiah Green, who also resided near Seattle, at a heavy metal show, at which point they decided to make music together. Brock says he made a point of the band being from Issaquah to avoid association with the music scenes of Seattle or Olympia and to keep with the band's suburban lyrical themes. In 1994, at Calvin Johnson's Dub Narcotic Studios, Modest Mouse recorded its first EP, Blue Cadet-3, Do You Connect?, which was released by K Records. This was followed by a single, "Broke", recorded by Steve Wold (a.k.a. bluesman Seasick Steve) under Sub Pop records at Moon Studios in Olympia, Washington. During this time, Modest Mouse also recorded what would have been its first album, Sad Sappy Sucker, but constant delays caused the album to be shelved and forgotten. It was not until 2001 that it was officially released. Before the band made its way into the pop music world in 2004, many of Modest Mouse's tours included stops at DIY/punk venues such as Speak in Tongues in Cleveland, Ohio, where they continued to play even after becoming popular enough to fill larger venues. The band is named after a line in the short story The Mark on the Wall by Virginia Woolf that refers to “the minds of modest, mouse-colored people who believe genuinely that they dislike to hear their own praises.” and has no connection to Modest Mussorgsky.

After moving to Up Records, Modest Mouse released two full-length albums and other recordings including the 1996 LP This Is a Long Drive for Someone with Nothing to Think About. Steve Wold also recorded and produced this album (and at the time was assisting in the recordings as well, but was not officially part of the band) along with the next offering, Interstate 8. The 1997 album, The Lonesome Crowded West (also recorded at Moon Studios, by Scott Swayze) served as the band's breakthrough. The Lonesome Crowded West gained the band a cult following, and is now popularly considered to be one of the defining albums of mid-1990s indie rock. During this time, Nick Kraft became involved with the task of refining the band's sound. Prior to its release, the band had recorded the EP The Fruit That Ate Itself. In 2000, Up Records released a singles and rarities collection entitled Building Nothing Out of Something that included the entirety of Interstate 8 except for the songs "Edit the Sad Parts" and "Buttons to Push the Buttons".

=== The Moon & Antarctica: 2000–2002 ===
The Moon & Antarctica album cover

In 2000, Modest Mouse released The Moon & Antarctica, its first album on Epic Records. The album, produced by Califone's Brian Deck during five months of sessions in Chicago, was met with critical acclaim, including a 9.8/10 score from online music magazine Pitchfork Media, despite concerns about releasing material on a major label. The album would later receive further acclaim.

The band licensed "Gravity Rides Everything" for a Nissan Quest minivan advertisement, a move that Brock has publicly acknowledged as blatantly commercial but necessary to achieve financial stability. Regarding the commercial, Brock stated, "People who don't have to make their living playing music can bitch about my principles while they spend their parents' money or wash dishes for some asshole."

In 2001, Modest Mouse released the EP Everywhere and His Nasty Parlour Tricks, a collection of unused songs from the recording sessions of The Moon & Antarctica. In 2002, the band joined Cake, De La Soul, The Flaming Lips, The Hackensaw Boys and Kinky on the Unlimited Sunshine Tour.

=== Good News for People Who Love Bad News and We Were Dead Before the Ship Even Sank: 2003–2009 ===
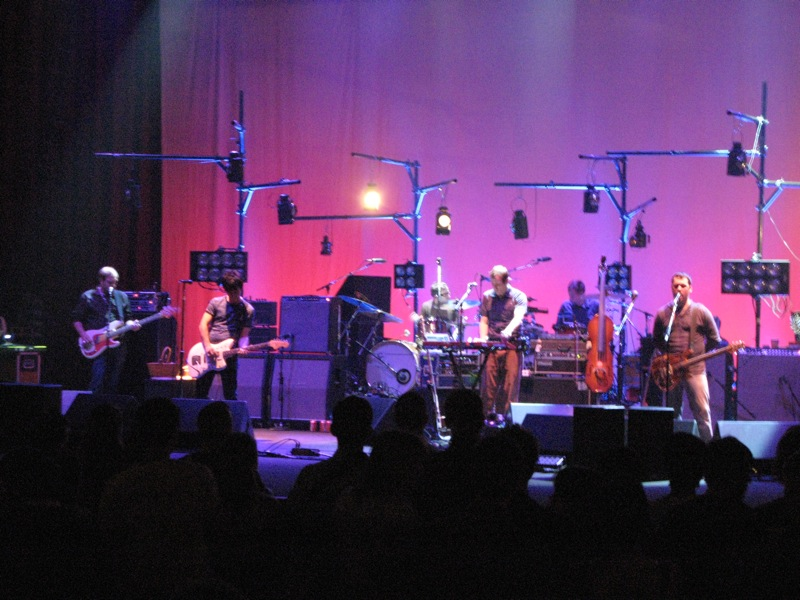
Modest Mouse performing live in 2007

In March 2003, Green left the band after suffering a nervous breakdown; official reports stated he was leaving to work with his side project, Vells. The same year, he and Judy appeared on Adam Forkner's first solo album, VVRSSNN. Drummer Benjamin Weikel joined the band, replacing Green, along with Murder City Devils guitarist Dann Gallucci, who had previously played with Modest Mouse. Prior to starting the band's writing and recording process, Brock was devastated by the loss of "a couple of the most important people in my life", he said. Following these events, the band released their fourth album, Good News for People Who Love Bad News, on April 6, 2004. The following August, the album was certified Platinum, having two hits with "Float On" and "Ocean Breathes Salty" (both of which they performed on Saturday Night Live on November 13, 2004). The album was nominated for a Grammy Award for Best Alternative Music Album that year, and "Float On" was nominated for Best Rock Song. Green rejoined the band in May 2004, while Weikel returned to drumming exclusively for the Helio Sequence. The public radio program Marketplace used "Float On" as bumper music, which helped propel the group to a broader audience.

In 2006, Johnny Marr (formerly of the Smiths) joined the band after Gallucci quit amicably. Modest Mouse released their next album, We Were Dead Before the Ship Even Sank, on March 20, 2007 after its original release date of December 19, 2006 was delayed. The album also included bonus track and single "King Rat", which actor Heath Ledger had known about before the track was released; the band was formally introduced to the actor while on their 2007 tour in Australia. Ledger proposed an outline for a music video to the group, and with his film collective, the Masses, immediately began working on it once he had the band's approval. Upon Ledger's death in January 2008, the video went unfinished.

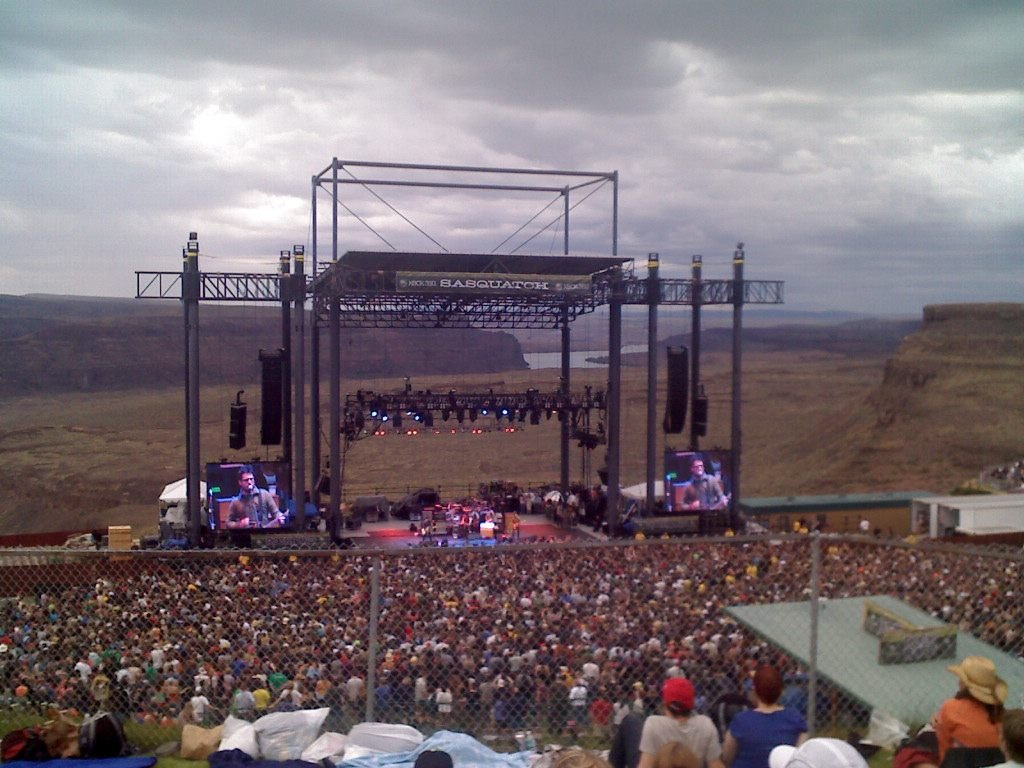
Modest Mouse performing at Sasquatch! Music Festival in Washington State in 2008.

We Were Dead Before the Ship Even Sank was the first Modest Mouse album to reach No. 1 on the US Billboard 200 charts and had the hit single "Dashboard", as well as "Missed the Boat" and "We've Got Everything". Modest Mouse released singles for the songs "Satellite Skin", "Autumn Beds" and "Perpetual Motion Machine" in limited edition—a total of 4,000 copies each—vinyl 7 inches, featuring artwork by art director and illustrator Joshua Marc Levy, J. Alex Stamos, and Natasha Wheat.

The band began a North American tour in June 2008. They returned to Florida, with three shows in Miami, Orlando and St. Augustine, for the first time since they were cut off stage early during the November 2006 Bang Music Festival show. Modest Mouse finished its tour supporting We Were Dead Before the Ship Even Sank after two years of promoting the record.

Marr left Modest Mouse to join the Cribs, and was replaced with Jim Fairchild, beginning with the tour of No One's First and You're Next, which was released on August 4, 2009, composed of unreleased tracks from the recording sessions of Good News for People Who Love Bad News and We Were Dead Before the Ship Even Sank.

=== Touring, lineup changes, and re-releases: 2010–2014 ===
In 2010, The Moon & Antarctica was re-released on vinyl as part of Record Store Day.

On July 4, 2010 the band headlined the second day of the 80/35 Music Festival in Des Moines, Iowa, and the first day of the End of the Road Festival in Dorset, England, on September 10, 2010. At the end of August 2010, Modest Mouse played on the main stage at the Leeds and Reading festivals.

On May 29, Modest Mouse played two new songs during their headline of the Sasquatch festival. The songs were called "Poison the Well" and "Lampshades on Fire". They then contributed a cover of the Buddy Holly song "That'll Be the Day" to the compilation Rave On Buddy Holly, which was released on June 28, 2011. Modest Mouse played at Splendour in the Grass in Woodford, Queensland on July 29, 2011, and at The Warfield in San Francisco on January 25, 2012.

In 2012, Modest Mouse underwent a significant lineup change, which included the departure of founding bassist Eric Judy and percussionist Joe Plummer, replaced by Russell Higbee (formerly of Man Man) and Davey Brozowski, respectively. The lineup also included the additions of multi-instrumentalist and vocalist Lisa Molinaro, and percussionist Ben Massarella, the latter of whom previously played percussion on The Moon & Antarctica.

In June of that same year, Pitchfork.tv released a 45-minute documentary on The Lonesome Crowded West, which included archival footage taken during live performances and original recording/mix sessions.

Modest Mouse played a Saturday afternoon set at the inaugural Firefly Music Festival in July 2012. Modest Mouse was one of the main acts in the Good Vibes Festival held in Sepang, Malaysia on August 17, 2013. The lineup featured other internationally renowned bands such as Smashing Pumpkins, Ash, and Japandroids. In April 2013, Modest Mouse performed at Coachella Music Festival in Indio, California. They also performed at the 2014 Hangout Music Festival in Gulf Shores, Alabama, in May 2014. They later performed as a headliner at Shaky Knees music festival in Atlanta, Georgia on May 10, 2014, and also headlined Sunday May 25 at Boston Calling in Massachusetts. Modest Mouse then performed at Hudson Valley Music Project in Saugerties, New York in July, 2014. The band's final performance of 2014 took place in Inglewood, California during the annual KROQ Almost Acoustic Christmas.

In the fall of 2014 Modest Mouse re-released their first two albums, This Is a Long Drive for Someone with Nothing to Think About and The Lonesome Crowded West, on CD and vinyl through Isaac Brock's Glacial Pace record label.

=== Strangers to Ourselves, The Golden Casket and Jeremiah Green's death: 2015–2022 ===
Eight years after the release of We Were Dead Before the Ship Even Sank, Modest Mouse released Strangers to Ourselves on March 17, 2015. On December 15, 2014, they released the lead single "Lampshades on Fire" which debuted on Twin Cities public radio station 89.3 The Current. On December 16, 2014, Modest Mouse made Strangers to Ourselves available for pre-order for CD and LP formats on the Glacial Pace website and on the iTunes store.

In 2015, Brock described the follow-up album to Strangers to Ourselves as being like a part two to the latter album that they would try to release as soon as legally possible. The follow-up album has also been said to feature at least one song with Nirvana bassist Krist Novoselic.

Throughout 2019, the band released three standalone singles; "Poison the Well" on March 29, "I'm Still Here" on April 18, and "Ice Cream Party" on November 15.

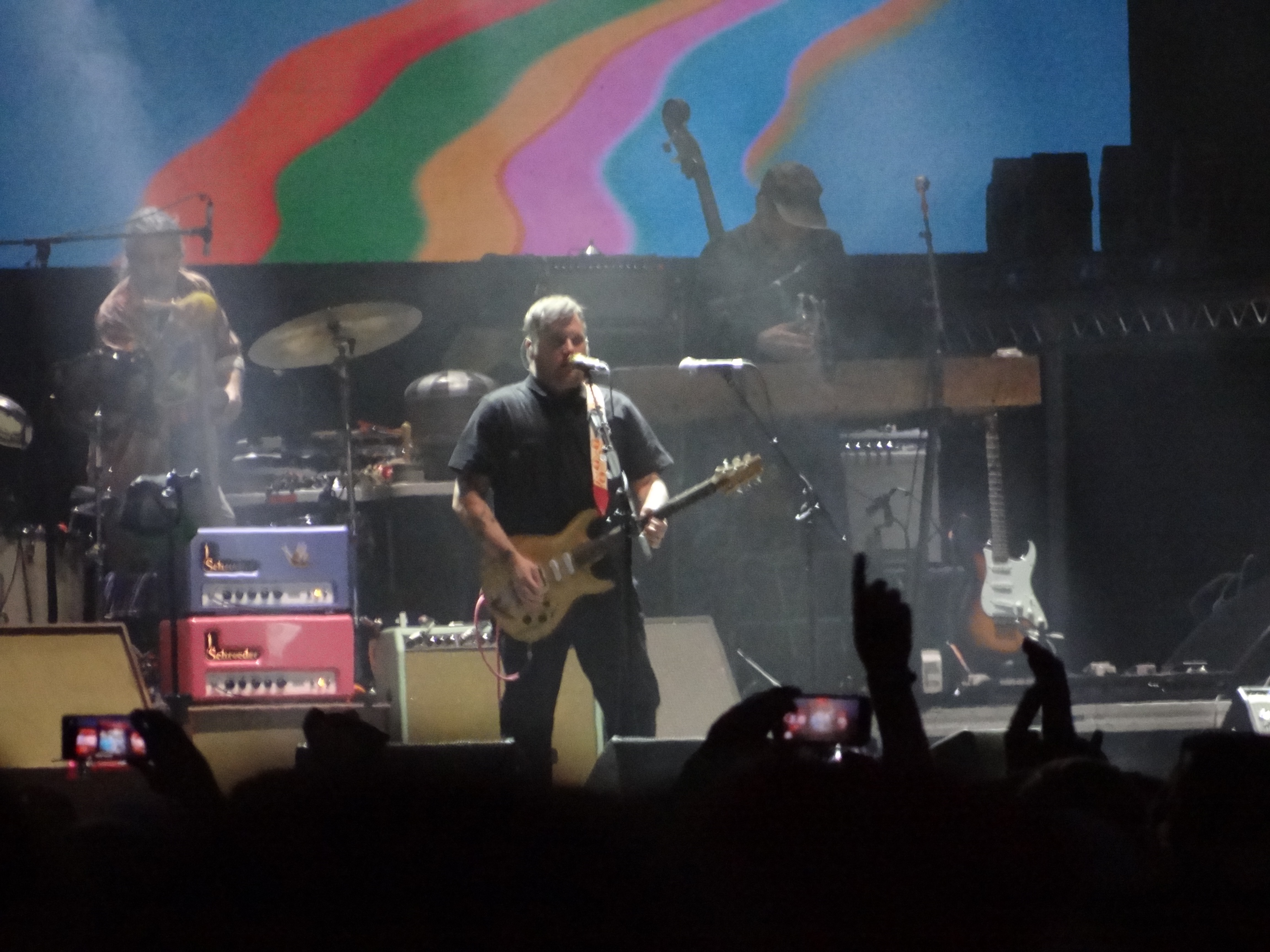
Modest Mouse performing at Shaky Knees Music Festival in Atlanta, Georgia in 2021.

Modest Mouse released their seventh studio album, The Golden Casket, on June 25, 2021. The album's first single, "We Are Between", was released on May 5, followed by its second single, “Leave a Light On”, released on May 24. Writing for the Wall Street Journal, music critic Mark Richardson gave a mixed review of the album. Richardson described the tracks on the first half of the album as "sound[ing] like busy arrangements in search of a song", and noted that "Mr. Brock's ear for hooks just barely rescues the tracks from the seriously overstuffed production." Richardson noted that the back half of the album contained the biggest highlights, which he described as "quite good". Richardson was particularly fond of the album's stripped-down finale, "Back to the Middle", which he noted "hints at what should be [the band's] next change-up: Keep it simple. If the songs are strong and the performances are there, guitar, bass and drums will be more than enough.

In an interview in 2022, celebrating 15 years of We Were Dead before The Ship Even Sank, Isaac Brock and Johnny Marr revealed that they were writing songs together again, the first of which is called "Rivers of Rivers". The writing took place in a "pen pal" kind of way, with Brock saying that there were more songs to be developed in 2022 together "once the world tilts back on its axis".

In July 2022 the band was mixing a nine-song companion EP to The Golden Casket, with Marr confirmed to appear on one of the tracks.

In the midst of a tour celebrating the 25th anniversary of The Lonesome Crowded West, drummer and founding member Jeremiah Green took an unannounced leave of absence. Days after his Stage IV cancer diagnosis was revealed to the public, Green died on December 31, 2022.

=== Continued touring and An Eraser and a Maze: 2023–present ===
In mid-2023, they opened several shows for Weezer during their Indie Rock Road Trip tour. The band co-headlined a North American tour with the Pixies in the Summer of 2024.

In April 2024, Brock announced that he was planning on reuniting the band's 2004 line-up which recorded Good News for People Who Love Bad News for a tour in celebration of the record, which resulted in former drummer Benjamin Weikel briefly returning to the band in 2024. The other band members from that era – Eric Judy, Dann Gallucci and Tom Peloso – did not rejoin the band for the tour. In August and September 2025, the band co-headlined the "It's Summertime" tour with the Flaming Lips.

In March 2026, the band released their first single since 2021, titled "Look How Far...". A month later, in April 2026, the band announced fall tour dates and their eighth studio album An Eraser and a Maze, which was released on June 5, 2026. A second single, "Picking Dragons' Pockets", was also released to coincide with the announcement. The album is the band's first to feature new members Simon O'Connor (guitar), Damon Cox (drums) and Keith Karman (keyboards).

The same year, Isaac Brock revealed in an interview with Paste that The Golden Casket's companion EP had been expanded to an album-length project titled Shadows in the Shade, with a tentative release date of 2027. In addition to Marr's feature on "Rivers of Rivers", it now features posthumous contributions from Jeremiah Green and Rob Laakso, the latter including a Songs: Ohia cover.

== Musical style and lyrics ==
Modest Mouse's music has been described as indie rock, alternative rock, post punk revival, punk rock, synthpop and emo. Marcy Donelson of AllMusic called Modest Mouse's sound "a volatile mix of punk-inspired rawness and simmering atmosphere" showing tendencies of "light-hearted pop". The band's early releases were said to be a mix of emo, post-rock, folk and progressive music. The early releases were also noted for their abrasiveness and sense of experimentation. Jim Alexander of NME wrote in a contemporary review of The Lonesome Crowded West: "Modest Mouse are the sound of the Pacific Northwest - this is music as rugged as the area it comes from." The band's later output contained pop sensibilities.

Frontman Isaac Brock's lyrical themes tend to explore topics such as small town life and religion. In 2016, a study conducted by music data company Musixmatch surveyed 43,414 songs spanning multiple genres found that Modest Mouse was one of the most profane bands among the subjects categorized as "indie rock," second only to The Neighborhood. It was estimated that the band used profanity every 310 words, and that the top three swear words uttered by the band were "shit," "fuck" and "ass," respectively.

== Band members ==
=== Current ===
Main instruments listed only

Image	Name	Years active	Instruments	Release contributions
	Isaac Brock	1993–present	lead vocals; guitars; banjo	all releases
	Russell Higbee	2012–present (touring 2010–2012)	bass guitar; guitar; keyboards; backing vocals; horns (2010–2012)	all releases from Strangers to Ourselves (2015)
	Ben Massarella	2014–present	percussion; effects; drums	The Moon & Antarctica (2000) (guest); all releases from Strangers to Ourselves (2015)
	Simon O'Connor	2021–present; not touring 2026–present	guitars; backing vocals	An Eraser and a Maze (2026)
	Damon Cox	2023–2024; 2025–present	drums; percussion	An Eraser and a Maze (2026)
	Keith Karman	2022–present	keyboards; guitar; bass guitar; backing vocals	An Eraser and a Maze (2026)

=== Former ===
Image	Name	Years active	Instruments	Release contributions
	Jeremiah Green	1993–2003; 2004–2022 (until his death)	drums; percussion	all releases from Blue Cadet-3, Do You Connect? (1994) to The Golden Casket (2021) except Good News for People Who Love Bad News (2004) An Eraser and a Maze (2026) (posthumous)
	Eric Judy	1993–1994; 1995–2012	bass guitar; acoustic guitar; backing vocals; guitar and keyboards (2003–2012)	all releases from This Is a Long Drive for Someone with Nothing to Think About (1996) to No One's First, and You're Next (2009)
	Dann Gallucci	1994–1995; 1997–1998; 2002–2005	guitars; organ; keyboards; backing vocals	Blue Cadet-3, Do You Connect? (1994); The Lonesome Crowded West (1997); Building Nothing Out of Something (2000); Sad Sappy Sucker (2001); Good News for People Who Love Bad News (2004); Baron von Bullshit Rides Again (2004); Strangers to Ourselves (guest) (2015)
	John Wickhart	1994–1995	bass guitar	Blue Cadet-3, Do You Connect? EP (1994) Sad Sappy Sucker (2001)
	Chris Majerus	1998	keyboards	none
	Tom Peloso	2004–2022 (Studio musician 2003)	keyboards (2005–2022); upright bass; backing vocals; bass guitar; horns; fiddle (2003–2005, 2021–2022)	all releases from Good News for People Who Love Bad News (2004) to The Golden Casket (2021) An Eraser and a Maze (2026) (guest)
	Benjamin Weikel	2003–2004; 2024	drums; percussion	Good News for People Who Love Bad News (2004) An Eraser and a Maze (2026) (guest)
	Joe Plummer	2004–2012	percussion; drums	Baron von Bullshit Rides Again (2004); We Were Dead Before the Ship Even Sank (2007); No One's First, and You're Next (2009)
	Jim Fairchild	2005–2006; 2009–2021	guitars; backing vocals	Strangers to Ourselves (2015); The Golden Casket (2021)
	Johnny Marr	2006–2009	guitars; backing vocals	We Were Dead Before the Ship Even Sank (2007); No One's First and You're Next (2009)
	Lisa Molinaro	2011–2021	viola; bass guitar; keyboards; backing vocals	Strangers to Ourselves (2015); The Golden Casket (2021)

=== Touring ===
Image	Name	Years active	Instruments	Release contributions
	Tyler Reilly	1997–2000	violin	The Moon & Antarctica (2000); Everywhere and His Nasty Parlour Tricks (2001)
	Robin Peringer	2000–2002	lead guitar; keyboards; effects	none
	Brandon Angle	2007	bass guitar; acoustic guitar; pump organ	none
	Andy MacLeod	2007	bass guitar; acoustic guitar; pump organ	none
	Dave Collis	2013	lead guitar	none
	Davey Brozowski	2012–2014	percussion; drums	Strangers to Ourselves (2015)
	Darrin Wiener	2010–2013	effects, keyboards	No One's First, And You're Next (2009); Strangers to Ourselves (2015)
	Seth Jabour	2026-present	guitar	none

== Discography ==
Studio albums

- This Is a Long Drive for Someone with Nothing to Think About (1996)
- The Lonesome Crowded West (1997)
- The Moon & Antarctica (2000)
- Good News for People Who Love Bad News (2004)
- We Were Dead Before the Ship Even Sank (2007)
- Strangers to Ourselves (2015)
- The Golden Casket (2021)
- An Eraser and a Maze (2026)

Other albums

- Building Nothing Out of Something (2000)
- Sad Sappy Sucker (2001) (recorded in 1994)

EPs

- Interstate 8 (EP) (1996)
- The Fruit That Ate Itself (1997)
- Everywhere and His Nasty Parlour Tricks (2001)
- No One's First, and You're Next (2009)
