= The Moon & Antarctica =

Studio album by Modest Mouse
- Released: June 13, 2000
- Recorded: July–November 1999
- Studios: Clava Studios, Chicago
- Genres: Indie rock; alternative rock; emo; indie pop
- Length: 59:43
- Label: Epic
- Producer: Brian Deck

Modest Mouse chronology
Building Nothing Out of Something (2000)	The Moon & Antarctica (2000)	Sad Sappy Sucker (2001)

Alternative cover
- 2004 reissue

The Moon & Antarctica is the third studio album by American rock band Modest Mouse, released on June 13, 2000, by Epic Records.

The Moon & Antarctica peaked at number 120 on the US Billboard 200, and received acclaim from critics, who praised its subject matter and change in sound from earlier albums and frontman Isaac Brock's introspective lyrics. It was also hailed for being an expansion of the band's sound, much due to their new major label budget as well as the production of Brian Deck. In 2021, NME referred to it as "one of the greatest records ever made".

== Background and recording ==
The album was the band's first released by a major record label, being issued on Epic Records.

The album was produced by Brian Deck, who first met the band at a concert in Detroit. "We ended up on a bill together at The Magic Stick in Detroit, and we got along really well, we hung out till the end of the night—and maybe consumed a fair amount of beer together" says Deck. Deck and Brock fell out of touch shortly thereafter, but reconnected a few years later, when Brock invited Califone (which included several members of Deck's band Red Red Meat) to hit the road as Modest Mouse's opening act.

The album was the first project to be recorded in Clava Studios in Chicago. When Modest Mouse band members arrived for the recording, the studio was not completely finished. Though Deck was mostly producing under Perishable Records at the time, and the studio was built mostly for Perishable projects, Deck had no problems producing under Epic Records. Despite being under a major label the band "remains largely self-managed and still drive themselves across the country on tour", and Brock was fairly involved in the mixing process. Deck said of Brock's involvement that, "By the end of making the record, he was able to mastermind some cool maneuvers with plug-ins and Pro Tools. It wasn't so much that he was mixing, but he could look at a song, understand the musical event that he wanted to make happen, understand the tools at his disposal, relate it in a way that I could understand, and make it happen pretty quickly."

In the middle of recording, Brock was attacked and had his jaw broken by a group of ruffians hanging out at a park across the street from where the band were staying in Chicago. "It laid him up in the hospital for a week," Deck says. "Then his jaw was wired shut for two or three months."

The recording for the album took 5 months, beginning in July 1999 and running until November 1999.

== Music and lyrics ==
Despite the fans' common concern that the switch to a major record label would change the band's unique sound, Isaac Brock assured fans that this would not be the case, "I don't think the new album is at all overpolished or anything. We spent more time getting crazy sounds than making things sound polished." AllMusic described the album's sound as "strangely subdued". The album's mood has been described as "melancholy", and its textures have been called "atmospheric" and "angular". Lyrical themes explored on the album include death and the afterlife.

== Reception ==
Professional ratings
Aggregate scores
Source	Rating
Metacritic	82/100
Review scores
Source	Rating
AllMusic	4.5/5 stars
The Austin Chronicle	4/5 stars
Houston Chronicle	4/5
The List	4/5 stars
Melody Maker	3.5/5 stars
NME	7/10
Pitchfork	9.8/10
Rolling Stone	3.5/5 stars
Select	4/5
The Village Voice	A−

The Moon & Antarctica was released to acclaim from music critics. Metacritic, which assigns a normalised rating out of 100 to reviews from mainstream publications, reported an average score of 82 based on 22 reviews, indicating "universal acclaim". Stephen Thompson of The A.V. Club felt that The Moon & Antarctica was the band's "weirdest record yet" and would downplay worries that Modest Mouse's move to a major label "would smooth out the edges of the group's brash, jerky sound", calling it a "sort of concept album about cold and distant places" held together by "a strange sort of precision, lending lurching power to the strongest material." Nick Catucci of The Village Voice noted the album's more streamlined production, in contrast to the lo-fi quality of their previous work, and complimented the fact that "the studio scrubbing leaves no noticeable film; even the effects—like the spacey guitar that launches 'Gravity Rides Everything'—ring true." Heather Phares of AllMusic felt that the production enhanced the album's introspective tone and called the album "their most cohesive collection of songs to date" and "an impressive, if flawed, map of Modest Mouse's ambitions and fears." Melody Maker praised The Moon & Antarctica as being "beyond anything else they've ever achieved".

Robert Christgau of The Village Voice remarked that Isaac Brock "may be every bit the ass he claims, but basically he seems chagrined that he was ever so inept or unlucky as to get caught up in this, as the saying goes, downward spiral. And unlike other rock pessimists we might name, he's so modest about it that he ends up with an uplifting representation of human life as damn shame." Brent DiCrescenzo of Pitchfork described The Moon & Antarctica as an "intoxicating mix of uncertainty and confidence". LA Weekly's Rita Neyler called the album "darker and colder" than the band's previous work, but nonetheless representative of "the very particular blend of peculiar lyrics and uncompromising rock that consistently weaves through all their records." In a negative review, Spin's Chris Ryan felt that "mistaking subject for style, Modest Mouse has chosen to accentuate on a tendency to drift rather than an ability to write emotionally effective songs."

=== Accolades ===
Pitchfork ranked The Moon & Antarctica as the third best album of 2000, trailing Kid A by Radiohead and Ágætis byrjun by Sigur Rós. The album ranked at number 49 on The Village Voice's Pazz & Jop year-end critics' poll. Pitchfork later named it the seventh best album of the years 2000 through 2004 and the sixth best album of the decade. Tiny Mix Tapes placed it at number 51 on their decade-end list. The Moon & Antarctica was included in Entertainment Weekly's "The New Classics", a list of the one hundred best albums released within 1983 to 2008. Rhapsody ranked the album at number four on its "Alt/Indie's Best Albums of the Decade" list.

As of October 2006 the album has sold 492,000 copies in United States. In March 2009, The Moon & Antarctica was certified gold by the Recording Industry Association of America. In 2015, Vitamin String Quartet paid tribute to the album by covering it in its entirety.

== Reissues ==
Isaac Brock was dissatisfied with the final mix and the album artwork for The Moon & Antarctica following its original 2000 release. According to an interview given in Filter in 2004, he intended to remix the album "on his own time, using his own money, simply to have a copy he alone could hear." Epic Records then offered to remaster the album to CD, reissuing it on March 9, 2004, with remastered audio, new artwork and four additional tracks from a BBC Radio 1 session. Stephen M. Deusner of Pitchfork rated the remastered edition a 5.0 out of 10, writing highly of the original album itself but questioning the decision to re-release it just four years after its initial release, calling the additional material "paltry offerings" and commenting that "no one was really asking for it, and there's simply not enough here to justify the expense or even a rating as high as the original."

A vinyl and CD reissue was released on April 13, 2010, to celebrate the 10th anniversary of the album, with both versions reverting to the original artwork and track listing. On April 27, 2015, Music on Vinyl reissued the album in two different variations in Europe, with one featuring remastered audio on transparent 180g vinyl in a production run limited to 500 pressings, and the other on standard black vinyl. Both removed the "locked groove" previously found on side 1 at the end of "Perfect Disguise".

== Track listing ==
All lyrics are written by Isaac Brock; all music is composed by Isaac Brock, Eric Judy, and Jeremiah Green, except where noted.

No.	Title	Music	Length
1.	"3rd Planet"		4:00
2.	"Gravity Rides Everything"		4:18
3.	"Dark Center of the Universe"		5:04
4.	"Perfect Disguise"		2:43
5.	"Tiny Cities Made of Ashes"		3:44
6.	"A Different City"		3:10
7.	"The Cold Part"		5:03
8.	"Alone Down There"		2:23
9.	"The Stars Are Projectors"		8:46
10.	"Wild Packs of Family Dogs"	Brock	1:45
11.	"Paper Thin Walls"		3:00
12.	"I Came as a Rat"		3:48
13.	"Lives"	Brock	3:19
14.	"Life Like Weeds"		6:30
15.	"What People Are Made Of"		2:13
Total length:			59:43

2004 re-release bonus tracks
No.	Title	Length
16.	"3rd Planet" (BBC Radio Edit)	4:00
17.	"Perfect Disguise"	3:00
18.	"Custom Concern" (Instrumental)	2:00
19.	"Tiny Cities Made of Ashes"	3:08

== Personnel ==
Modest Mouse

- Isaac Brock – guitars, vocals
- Jeremiah Green – drums
- Eric Judy – bass

Additional musicians

- Ben Blankenship – lap steel guitar (1, 4), banjo (4), keyboards (5, 11, 14), guitar (8, 11, 15)
- Brian Deck – drum programming (2), keyboards (6)
- Tyler Reilly – violin (3, 5, 7, 9, 13, 14)
- Ben Massarella – percussion (5, 7, 12, 15)
- Jeff Kennedy – lap steel guitar (5)
- Greg Ratajczak – guitar (7)
- Tim Rutili – background vocals (11)
- Chiyoko Yoshida – background vocals (13)

Production

- Brian Deck – producer, mixer
- Greg Ratajczak – producing and mixing assistant
- Phil Ek – recording (10)
- Bob Ludwig – mastering
- Mary Maurer – art direction
- Simon Labalestier – cover photography, photography
- Isaac Brock, Eric Judy, Jeremiah Green – photography
- Monster X – design

== Charts ==
Chart (2000)	Peak position
US Billboard 200	120
US Heatseekers Albums (Billboard)	5

== Certifications ==
Region	Certification	Certified units/sales
United States (RIAA)	Gold	500,000^{^}
^{^} Shipments figures based on certification alone.
