= Tom Peloso =

American musician

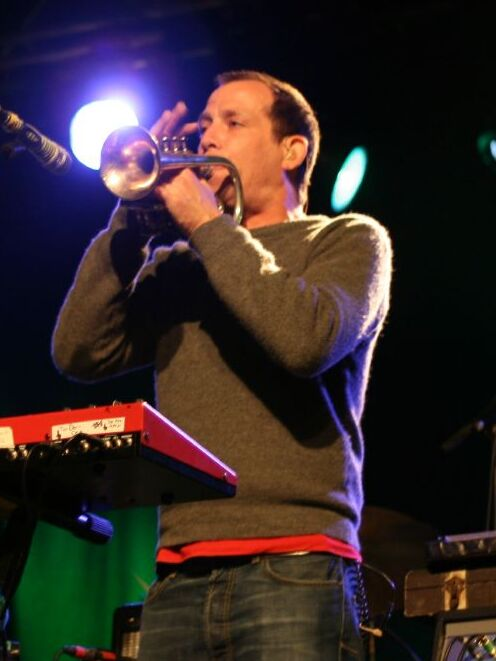

Background information
- Born: February 25, 1967 (age 59); Danbury, Connecticut
- Genres: Indie rock
- Occupations: Singer; songwriter; musician
- Instruments: Vocals; guitar; bass guitar; double bass; keyboards; trumpet; cornet; violin; kalimba
- Years active: 1999–present

Tom Peloso is an American musician. He was a member of the indie rock band Modest Mouse from 2003 to 2022. Peloso first played with Modest Mouse on their 2004 album, Good News for People Who Love Bad News, up to the 2021 album, The Golden Casket. He also played in his own band, Tom Peloso and The Virginia Sheiks.

Before joining Modest Mouse, Peloso was a founding member of the Charlottesville based bluegrass group The Hackensaw Boys, playing upright bass and fiddle. Two of his songs, "Hobo" and "Sweet Petunia", appear on their album Look Out! On March 1, 2009 Tom Peloso released a digital EP, The Last Saturday of the Year, containing four new tracks recorded in fall 2008 at Monkeyclaus studio.

== Personal life ==
Peloso is the son of Peter and Maureen Peloso.
