= Jeremiah Green =

American drummer (1977–2022)

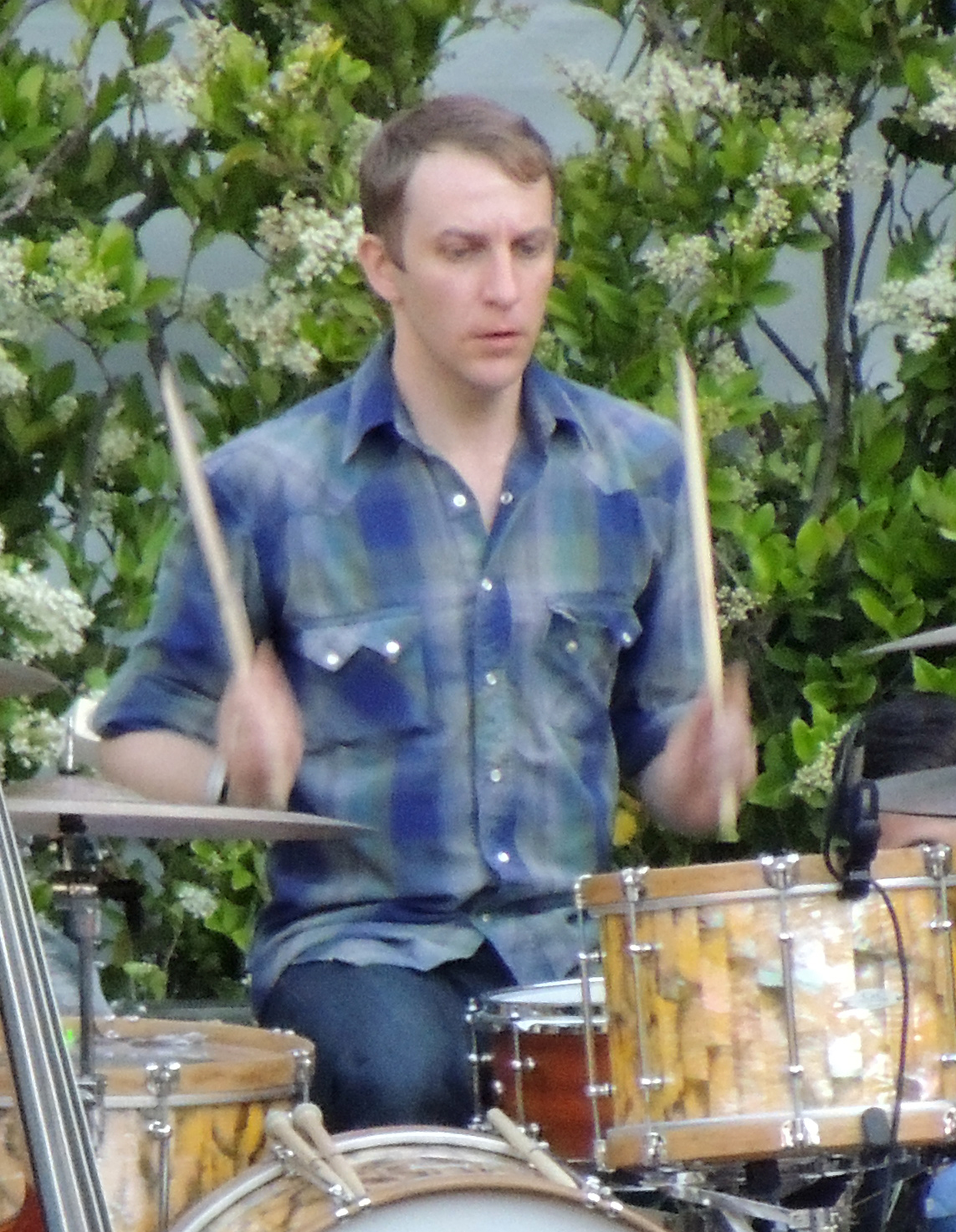
- Green in 2012

Background information
- Born: Jeremiah Martin Green; March 4, 1977; Oahu, Hawaii, U.S.
- Died: December 31, 2022 (aged 45) Sequim, Washington, U.S.
- Genres: Rock, indie rock
- Occupation: Musician
- Instrument: Drums
- Years active: 1993–2022

Jeremiah Martin Green (March 4, 1977 – December 31, 2022) was an American musician best known as a founding member and drummer of the indie rock band Modest Mouse from 1993 to March 2003, and again from May 2004 until his death in December 2022.

== Early life ==
Jeremiah Martin Green was born on March 4, 1977, in Oahu, Hawaii, while his father was stationed there in the Army. He grew up in Moxee, Washington, a few miles outside of Yakima. His family moved to the Seattle area in 1989. He had an older brother named Adam. His father was an alcoholic who was abusive to Green; he later apologized and reconciled with his son.

Green took drumming lessons for three months in his early teens but was uninspired by his teacher. He immersed himself in the Seattle music scene, joining a band and attending concerts at night. His early influences included local groups such as Treepeople and Hammerbox. His first favorite band was the English gothic rock band The Cure; Green was particularly inspired by the drumming on their 1982 album Pornography. However, Green cited the Washington, D.C., post-hardcore band Fugazi as his biggest influence for starting a band.

== Career ==
Green began his touring and recording career while he was in high school. In 1993, he became a founding member of Modest Mouse, formed with Isaac Brock and Eric Judy in Issaquah, Washington. In the mid-1990s, Green played with the bands Satisfact on K Records, Red Stars Theory on Touch and Go Records, and Peeved on Distressed Records. He also played with the bands Vells and Psychic Emperor. Both bands played at venues around Seattle and the Pacific Northwest.

In 2003, on his birthday, Green quit Modest Mouse. He later revealed that he suffered a nervous breakdown and was briefly admitted to a psychiatric hospital. He had earlier been diagnosed with bipolar disorder and prescribed the antidepressant Effexor. Combined with alcohol and psilocybin mushrooms, he experienced severe manic episodes. After quitting, the band had quickly convinced Green to return, but on the second day of recording in Portland he exploded in argument and then disappeared for two months. He stopped taking his antidepressants and experienced a painful period of withdrawal. Faced with Green's absence, Modest Mouse initially considered breaking up. Green was eventually replaced by Benjamin Weikel of The Helio Sequence. Green's departure caused him to be absent during the entire recording process of the band's 2004 album Good News for People Who Love Bad News. Green officially rejoined the band in May 2004. In 2007, Green appeared on Graig Markel's Via Novella on the Sonic Boom Label. In May 2008, Green released a drum breaks 7" collaboration with Plastiq Phantom under the alias World Gang on the Imputor? label.

== Style and reception ==
Of his work on Sad Sappy Sucker, Spencer Owen at Pitchfork said, "Jeremiah Green proves himself to be one of indie rock's best drummers, even this early on in the game." In an interview, Benjamin Weikel stated that Green's drum parts have a "great, loose feeling that's hard to emulate".

Green placed 37th in Stylus Magazine's list of "50 Greatest Rock Drummers", where Jonathan Bradley described his drumming:

His rhythms can be as unkempt and intricate as the music they underpin (the rolling shuffle of "Grey Ice Water", or the stumbling clatter of "Truckers Atlas", for instance), but they are always strong enough to bolster the momentum of even the most meandering tracks. And when presented with a genuine groove, like the lean, funky "Tiny Cities Made of Ashes", he forces the band to march in lockstep behind him.

== Personal life and death ==
Green was married to Lauren, who owned the store Thuja in downtown Port Townsend, Washington. Their son was born in 2016.

On December 25, 2022, it was announced that Green had been diagnosed with stage IV cancer. He died in Sequim, Washington, on December 31, 2022, at age 45.
