= Isaac Brock (musician) =

American musician

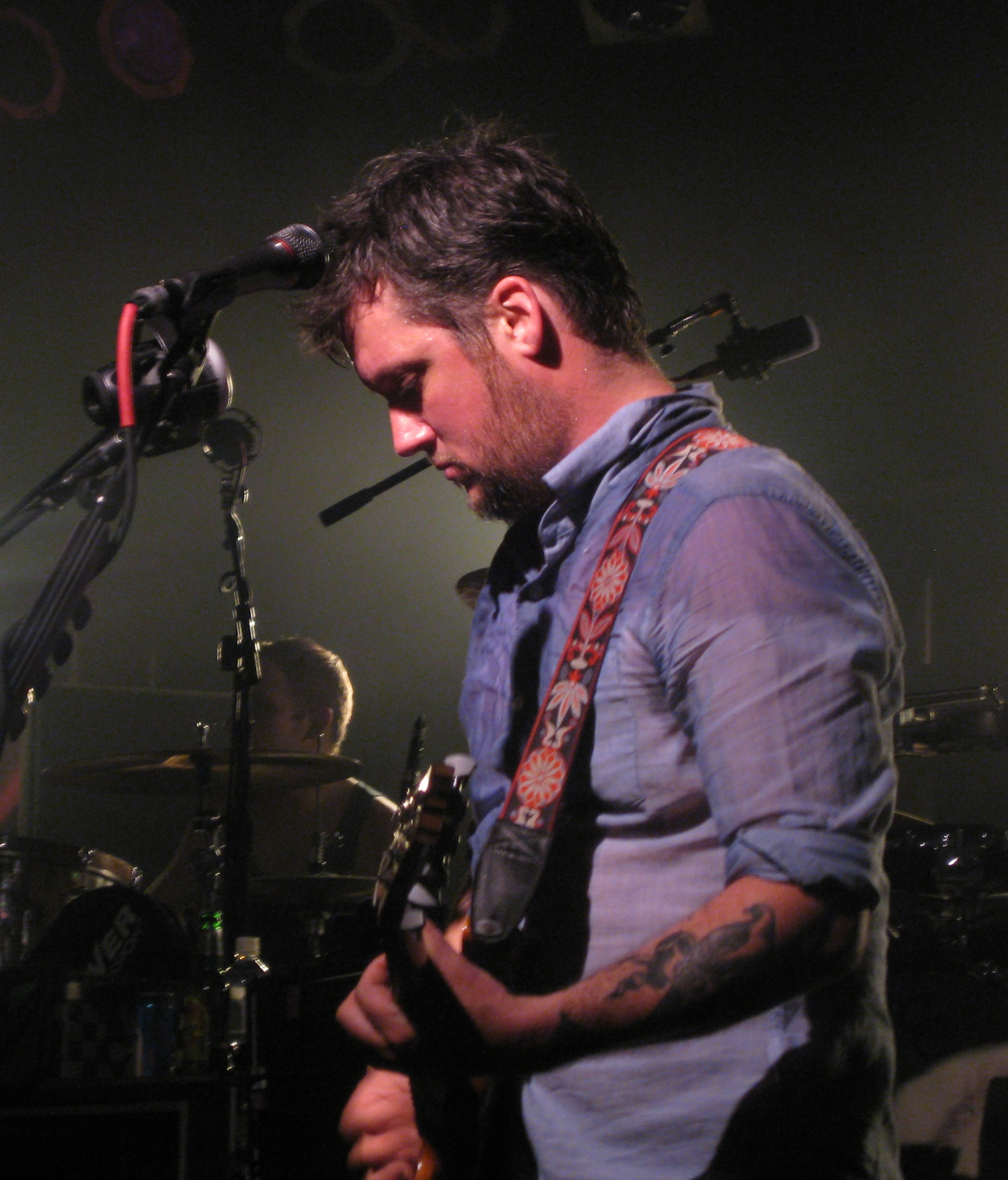
- Brock performing with Modest Mouse in 2010
- Born: Isaac Kristofer Brock; July 9, 1975 (age 51); Helena, Montana, U.S.
- Occupations: Singer, musician, songwriter
- Years active: 1992–present
- Known for: Modest Mouse discography
- Children: 3
- Musical career
- Genres: Indie rock; indie folk; experimental music
- Instruments: Vocals; guitar; ukulele; banjo; piano
- Labels: Epic; Sub Pop; Up Records; K Records
- Member of: Modest Mouse
- Formerly of: Ugly Casanova

Isaac Kristofer Brock (born July 9, 1975) is an American musician and singer-songwriter. He is the lead vocalist, principal songwriter, guitarist and only constant member of the indie rock band Modest Mouse, as well as his side project band, Ugly Casanova.

As a songwriter, Brock is praised for his use of "plain English to communicate complex meditations". Brock is the sole founding member of Modest Mouse still with the band; he is also the only member to appear on all of its studio albums.

== Early life ==
Brock was born in Helena, Montana. During his childhood, he lived with his mother and sister in Montana and Oregon in hippie communes and churches before moving to Issaquah, Washington when he was 11 years old. He was raised in a Christian religious sect called the Grace Gospel Church. He told an interviewer from The Guardian that he was asked to speak in tongues when he was six.

== Personal life ==
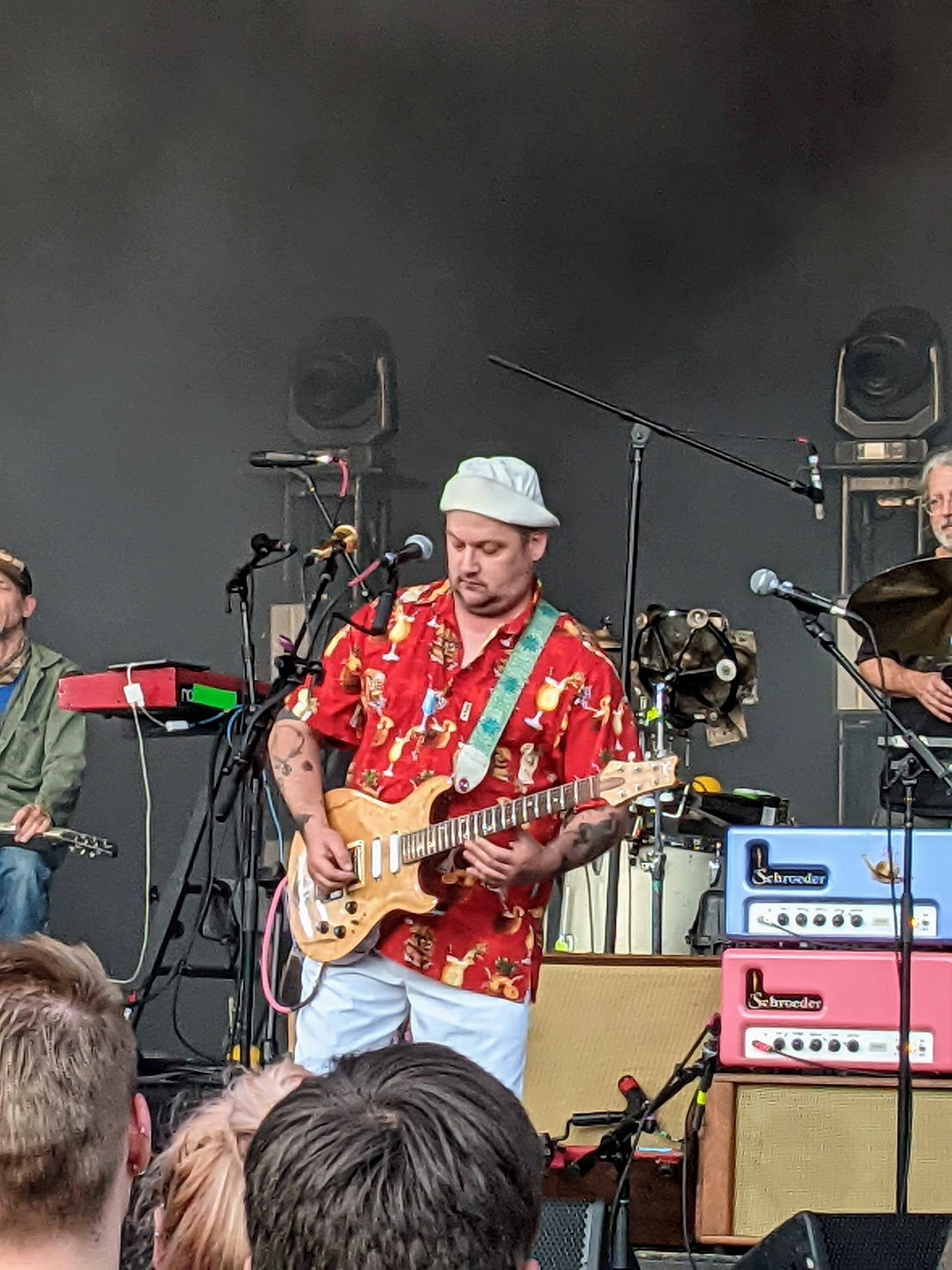
Performing in Pittsburgh, Pennsylvania with Modest Mouse in August 2021

Although many of his songs use religious themes, Brock describes himself as "not really religious at all", adding "I'm 100 percent on the whole Christianity thing being a crock of shit, pretty much." He claims to "toy around with the whole Biblical thing," because it "just has amazing characters" and also identifies himself as "pretty much" an atheist.

Brock was arrested for driving under the influence and attempted murder after a getting into a car accident in which one of his passengers dislocated her thumb. He explained that "in Oregon, they give you attempted murder for any injury involving alcohol."

In 2004 his adopted brother Ansel Vizcaya was killed in an avalanche climbing Mount Rainier.

Brock is a former member of the A&R team for the record label Sub Pop, and signed Wolf Parade in 2004.

== Discography ==
With Modest Mouse

- This Is a Long Drive for Someone with Nothing to Think About (1996)
- The Lonesome Crowded West (1997)
- The Moon & Antarctica (2000)
- Good News for People Who Love Bad News (2004)
- We Were Dead Before the Ship Even Sank (2007)
- Strangers to Ourselves (2015)
- The Golden Casket (2021)
- An Eraser and a Maze (2026)

With Ugly Casanova

- Sharpen Your Teeth (2002)
