= Eric Judy =

American musician

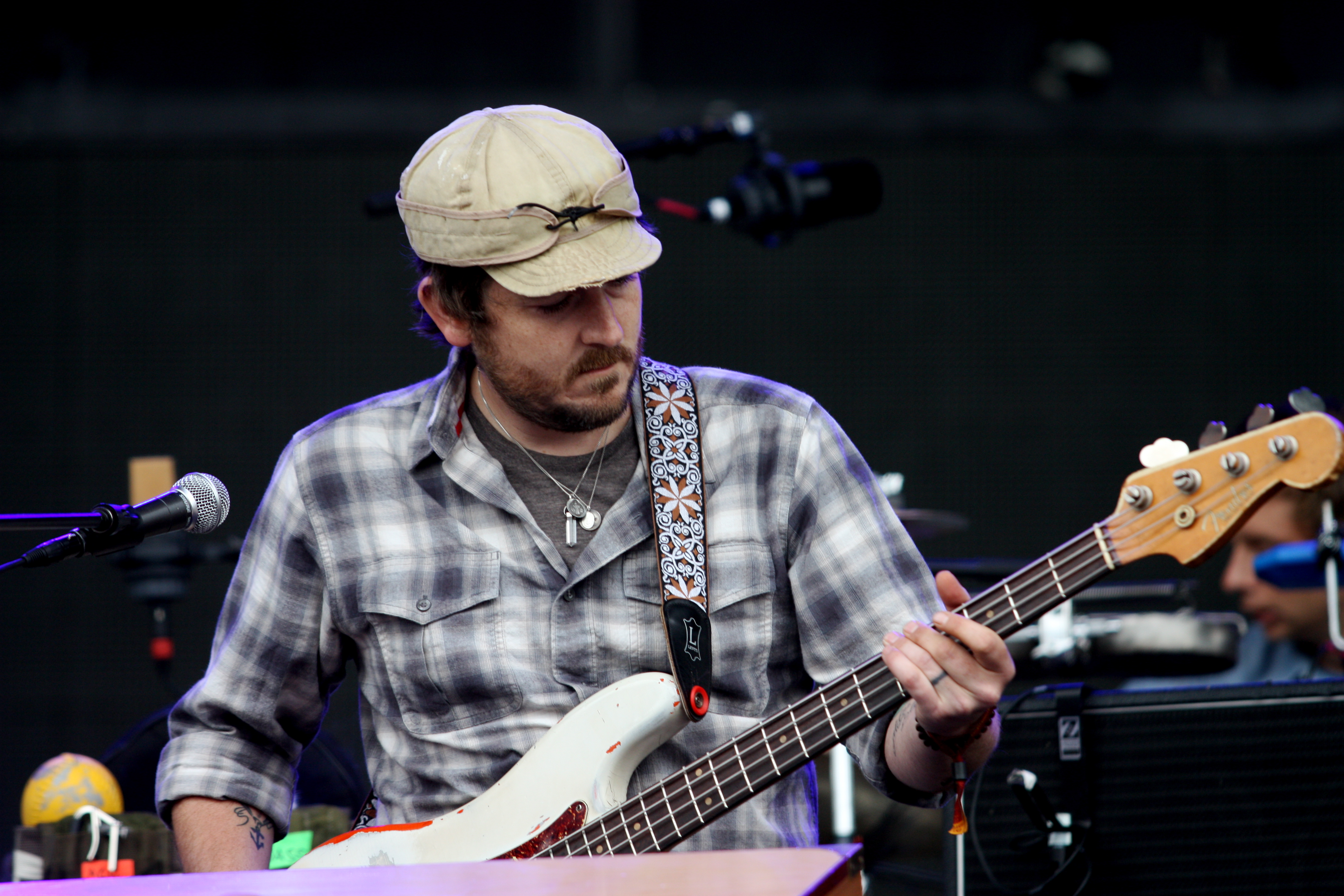
Judy with Modest Mouse in 2009

Eric Scott Judy (born November 16, 1974) is an American musician best known as the original bass guitarist, co-founder, and backing vocalist of the indie rock band Modest Mouse.

Judy departed the group in roughly 2011 or early 2012. He informed band members that he was leaving Modest Mouse in advance of recording for Strangers To Ourselves. Per Isaac Brock, Judy “finally had enough. He has three kids. He didn’t feel like leaving his house as much as is required. He left right before we started recording, but some of his writing still exists throughout the record. Making a record without him was really fucking hard.”

== Other work ==
Judy appeared on Adam Forkner's first solo album in 2003.

He also is a member of Isaac Brock's side project Ugly Casanova.

As of 2016, Judy played in the Seattle-based Rudy Waltz.

As of 2021, he owns a bookstore in Seattle with his wife Desirae Wilkerson.
