= You & Me (The Walkmen album) =

Studio album by The Walkmen
- Released: August 19, 2008
- Studio: Gigantic, New York; Water Music Recorders, Hoboken; Sweet Tea Recording, Oxford; Brutalis, Philadelphia
- Genre: Indie rock
- Length: 51:01
- Label: Gigantic Music
- Producer: The Walkmen

The Walkmen chronology
"Pussy Cats" Starring the Walkmen (2006)	You & Me (2008)	Lisbon (2010)

Singles from You & Me
- 1. "The Blue Route" / "Canadian Girl" Released: November 10, 2008; 2. "In the New Year" Released: February 23, 2009

You & Me is the fourth studio album by the American rock band the Walkmen, released on August 19, 2008, by Gigantic Music.

== Release ==
A special pre-release of the album was made available on July 29, 2008 through the independent music website Amie Street. The album sold for five dollars, with proceeds going to the Memorial Sloan-Kettering Cancer Center. The album was officially released in the United States on August 19, 2008. During its first week of sales, the album charted at number 29 on Billboard's Top Digital Albums. The album was initially released on CD, with a limited heavyweight red vinyl edition released on September 2.

You & Me was released in the UK on September 29, 2008 by independent label Fierce Panda. Fierce Panda issued the songs "The Blue Route" and "Canadian Girl" as a double A-side single on November 10, 2008. A second single, "In the New Year", with the non-album track "Ride Down the Highway" as the B-side, followed on February 23, 2009.

The song "Red Moon" was featured in season 2, episode 2 ("Grilled") of Breaking Bad, and the song "New Country" was featured in the film 50/50.

== Critical reception ==
Professional ratings
Aggregate scores
Source	Rating
Metacritic	78/100
Review scores
Source	Rating
AllMusic	4/5 stars
Alternative Press	3.5/5 stars
The Austin Chronicle	4/5 stars
The A.V. Club	A
The Guardian	5/5 stars
NME	7/10
Pitchfork	8.5/10
Q	4/5 stars
Rolling Stone	3/5 stars
Spin	4/5 stars

You & Me garnered broadly positive critical acclaim from reviewers. Turntable Kitchen described it as "a thoughtful album that bears witness to a band that is comfortable in their own skin having learned the value of subtlety." Spin gave the album four stars out of five, calling it "a bittersweet, but emboldened fairy tale of New York City rock." The Guardian awarded the album five out of five stars, describing it as "intimate, intense and beautiful... You & Me demands repeat plays and The Walkmen deserve a new respect." Drowned in Sound gave the album 8 out of 10, saying "It's not a showy record, but one that when peeled apart reveals itself to be a darker and more engaging album than on first listen. But not only that, as it might also be the best thing they've ever done."

== Track listing ==
All songs written by The Walkmen (Hamilton Leithauser, Paul Maroon, Walter Martin, Peter Matthew Bauer, Peter Bauer and Matt Barrick).

1. "Dónde está la playa" – 3:55
2. "Flamingos" (for Colbert) – 1:11
3. "On the Water" – 3:10
4. "In the New Year" – 4:22
5. "Seven Years of Holidays" (for Stretch) – 3:40
6. "Postcards from Tiny Islands" – 4:04
7. "Red Moon" – 4:02
8. "Canadian Girl" – 4:05
9. "Four Provinces" – 4:02
10. "Long Time Ahead of Us" – 3:47
11. "The Blue Route" – 4:26
12. "New Country" – 3:44
13. "I Lost You" – 3:32
14. "If Only It Were True" – 3:07

== Singles ==
- "The Blue Route" b/w "Canadian Girl" (double A-side 7" single, November 10, 2008; Fierce Panda)
- "In the New Year" (single version) b/w "Ride Down the Highway" (7" single, February 23, 2009; Fierce Panda)

== Credits ==
- The Walkmen are:
  - Hamilton Leithauser – vocals, guitar
  - Paul Maroon – guitar, piano
  - Walter Martin – organ, bass
  - Peter Bauer – bass, organ
  - Matt Barrick – drums
- Recorded by Chris Zane at Gigantic Studios, Manhattan; and John Agnello at Water Music, Hoboken and Sweet Tea Studios, Oxford, Mississippi.
- Alex Aldi – second engineer at Gigantic Studios.
- "Flamingos" recorded and mixed by Paul Maroon at Brutalis Studios, Philadelphia.
- All songs mixed by Chris Zane at Gigantic Studios, Manhattan, 2008.
- Mastered by Emily Lazar at The Lodge.
- Assistant mastering engineer – Joe LaPorta.
- All photographs by Fred Maroon.
- Design by Elizabeth Spiridakis.
