= "Pussy Cats" Starring the Walkmen =

Studio album by The Walkmen
- Released: October 24, 2006
- Recorded: January–June 2006
- Studios: Marcata Recording, New York; Eric's House, Nashville
- Length: 39:39
- Label: Record Collection
- Producer: The Walkmen

The Walkmen chronology
A Hundred Miles Off (2006)	"Pussy Cats" Starring the Walkmen (2006)	You & Me (2008)

Professional ratings
Aggregate scores
Source	Rating
Metacritic	67/100
Review scores
Source	Rating
Allmusic	link
The Austin Chronicle	Nov. 10, 2006
The A.V. Club	B Nov. 7, 2006
Entertainment Weekly	B Oct. 20, 2006
NOW	5/5 Nov. 16, 2006
Pitchfork Media	5.1/10 Oct. 24, 2006
PopMatters	5/10 Oct. 24, 2006
Rolling Stone	Sep. 21, 2006
Stylus Magazine	C Oct. 25, 2006
Tiny Mix Tapes	4/5 link

"Pussy Cats" Starring the Walkmen is a studio album by the American rock band the Walkmen, released on October 24, 2006, by Record Collection. The album is a song-for-song cover of the 1974 Harry Nilsson album Pussy Cats which was produced by John Lennon.

The decision to cover the Pussy Cats album, which is a band favourite, started off as a joke that evolved into a full-fledged album released only 5 months after their previous record, A Hundred Miles Off. The album also served as a last project for the band's studio, Marcata Recording. Marcata, which band members Matt Barrick, Paul Maroon and Walter Martin built in 1999, was located in a building owned by Columbia University, which took the property back in 2006. The making of the album, which took "about ten days," was filmed by Norman "Rockwell" Coady and the footage was made into the documentary In Loving Recognition, included on the album's accompanying DVD.

== Track listing ==
No.	Title	Original Artist	Length
1.	"Many Rivers to Cross"	Jimmy Cliff	4:46
2.	"Subterranean Homesick Blues"	Bob Dylan	3:24
3.	"Don't Forget Me"	Harry Nilsson	3:48
4.	"All My Life"	Nilsson	3:07
5.	"Old Forgotten Soldier"	Nilsson	4:34
6.	"Save the Last Dance"	Doc Pomus, Mort Shuman	4:46
7.	"Mucho Mungo/Mt. Elga"	John Lennon, Nilsson	3:57
8.	"Loop de Loop"	Ted Vann	3:45
9.	"Black Sails"	Nilsson	3:59
10.	"Rock Around the Clock"	Jimmy DeKnight, Max C. Freedman	3:33

== Personnel ==
- Matt Barrick – conga, drums, maracas, tambourine, cowbell, wood block
- Peter Bauer – organ, farfisa organ, Vox Continental
- Chris Colbert – engineer, mixing
- Paul Gomez – A&R
- Hamilton Leithauser – acoustic guitar, glockenspiel, electric guitar, vocals, handwriting
- Dana Lyn – viola
- Paul Maroon – piano, electric guitar
- Walter Martin – acoustic guitar, bass, kazoo, maracas, organ, piano, tambourine, triangle, vibraslap, cowbell, fuzz bass, slide whistle
- Kevin McMahon – engineer, mixing
- Rob Moose – violin
- Quentin Stoltzfus – vocals
- Jordan Tappis – A&R
- Elijah Thomson – assistant engineer, mixing assistant
- Alex Waterman – cello, string arrangements
- Tim Ruedeman – saxophone
