= Satellite Skin =

2009 single by Modest Mouse

Single by Modest Mouse

from the album No One's First and You're Next
- Released: May 26, 2009
- Genre: Indie rock
- Length: 4:01
- Label: Epic
- Songwriters: Isaac Brock, Jeremiah Green, Eric Judy, Johnny Marr, Tom Peloso, Joe Plummer
- Producer: Dennis Herring

Modest Mouse singles chronology
"Little Motel" (2007)	"Satellite Skin" (2009)	"Autumn Beds" (2009)

No One's First and You're Next track listing
- 1. "Satellite Skin"; 2. "Guilty Cocker Spaniels"; 3. "Autumn Beds"; 4. "The Whale Song"; 5. "Perpetual Motion Machine"; 6. "History Sticks to Your Feet"; 7. "King Rat"; 8. "I've Got It All (Most)"

"Satellite Skin" is a single released by indie rock band Modest Mouse. It is the first single from their EP, No One's First and You're Next.

The song was originally slated for an April 18, 2009, release date, but was pushed back to May 26, 2009, because Isaac Brock didn't like the color of the vinyl, as it wasn't the right shade of orange. The vinyl is limited to 4000 hand-numbered copies.

== Music video ==
The surreal music video for "Satellite Skin" was directed by Kevin Willis. Willis is known for his frequent involvement as co-producer in the music videos of alternative metal band Tool. The video includes stop-motion animation, namely portraying "birdhouse creatures". The creatures are involved in a forest ritual where eggs from inside the houses are hatched. The video debuted on MySpace on May 15.

== Track listing ==
All lyrics are written by Isaac Brock; all music is composed by Modest Mouse.

No.	Title	Length
1.	"Satellite Skin"	4:01
2.	"Guilty Cocker Spaniels"	4:00

== Credits ==
Side A: "Satellite Skin"

- Joe Plummer - Drums
- Isaac Brock - Vocals, Guitar, Kalimba
- Eric Judy - Bass
- Tom Peloso - Piano, Lap Steel
- Johnny Marr - Guitar, Slide
- Jeremiah Green - Percussion

Side B: "Guilty Cocker Spaniels"

- Isaac Brock - Guitar, Vocals
- Eric Judy - Bass, Acoustic Guitar
- Benjamin Weikel - Drums
- Dann Gallucci - Keyboards

Cover Art by Joshua Marc Levy
