= Everyone Who Pretended to Like Me Is Gone =

Studio album by The Walkmen
- Released: March 26, 2002
- Studio: Marcata Recording, New York
- Genre: Indie rock; post-punk
- Length: 50:49
- Label: Startime International
- Producer: The Walkmen; Greg Talenfeld

The Walkmen chronology
Everyone Who Pretended to Like Me Is Gone (2002)	Bows + Arrows (2004)

Everyone Who Pretended to Like Me Is Gone is the debut studio album by the American rock band the Walkmen, released on March 26, 2002, by Startime International.

The Walkmen celebrated the album's release by performing at the Knitting Factory on April 6, 2002. The album received generally positive reviews, especially from independent music reviewers. The song "We've Been Had" was featured in commercials for the Saturn Ion. The cover is a detail of a Lewis W. Hine photograph, called Newsies at Skeeter's Branch, St. Louis, Missouri, 11:00 am, May 9, 1910.

== Reception ==
Professional ratings
Review scores
Source	Rating
AllMusic	4.5/5 stars
Cokemachineglow	83%
Entertainment Weekly	B−
Pitchfork	8.7/10
Stylus Magazine	A−
The Village Voice	C+

AllMusic's Charles Spano gave Everyone Who Pretended to Like Me Is Gone 4.5 out of 5 stars, writing that "It is not so much that the Walkmen sound like Television or the Talking Heads or Blondie, but that they, like their NYC peers Interpol, the French Kicks, and Radio 4, evoke the gritty, urban energy so well."

=== Accolades ===
Publication	Accolade	Year	Rank
Pitchfork	The 50 Best Albums of 2002	2003	27

== Track listing ==
1. "They're Winning" – 2:06
2. "Wake Up" – 4:13
3. "Everyone Who Pretended to Like Me Is Gone" – 4:12
4. "Revenge Wears No Wristwatch" – 3:20
5. "The Blizzard of '96" – 3:01
6. "French Vacation" – 4:31
7. "Stop Talking" – 4:07
8. "We've Been Had" – 3:29
9. "Roll Down the Line" – 3:11
10. "That's the Punch Line" – 3:13
11. "It Should Take a While" – 6:22
12. "Rue the Day" – 3:36
13. "I'm Never Bored" – 5:28

== Personnel ==
The Walkmen

- Hamilton Leithauser - vocals, guitars
- Paul Maroon - guitars, pianos
- Walter Martin - organs, tapes
- Peter Bauer - bass
- Matt Barrick - drums

Additional Personnel

- Kirsten McCord, Karen Waltuch, Meredith Yayanos - strings (3)
- Harlem Horns - horns (7)
