= Heaven (The Walkmen album) =

Studio album by the Walkmen
- Released: May 29, 2012
- Recorded: November 2011 – March 2012
- Studios: Avast! Recording Co., Seattle; Bear Creek, Woodinville
- Genre: Indie rock
- Length: 47:07
- Labels: Fat Possum; Bella Union
- Producer: Phil Ek

The Walkmen chronology
Lisbon (2010)	Heaven (2012)

Singles from Heaven
- 1. "Heaven" Released: May 29, 2012; 2. "Heartbreaker" Released: June 4, 2012; 3. "The Love You Love" Released: August 27, 2012

Heaven is the sixth studio album by the American rock band the Walkmen, released on May 29, 2012, by Fat Possum Records and Bella Union.

== Recording ==
Heaven was recorded between November 2011 to March 2012 in Seattle and in the woods of Washington. The album was produced by Phil Ek and featured contributions from Fleet Foxes' Robin Pecknold and Morgan Henderson and Cocteau Twins' Simon Raymonde. The band wanted to work with Phil Ek because of his work on Helplessness Blues. Hamilton Leithauser described the recording process for Heaven as the band's easiest one yet. Like with other more recent Walkmen albums, guitarist Paul Maroon wrote song outlines for the rest of the band to fill in the parts and lyrics.

Hamilton Leithauser described Heaven as "lush-sounding" and "big and optimistic and fun and grand." The album's title was meant to reflect those vibes. Frank Sinatra heavily influenced the singing on the album.

== Release ==
The album was originally going to be released on June 5, 2012, but the released date was pushed forward to May 30, 2012. The first single released from Heaven, "Heaven," was released on April 16, 2012. A second song from the album, "Heartbreaker," was released on April 18, 2012. A third track from the album, "We Can't Be Beat," was released on May 8, 2012. On May 20, 2012, the album was streamed in its entirety on NPR Music.

On May 30, 2012, a music video for the track "Heaven" was released. The music video, directed by Alex Southam and produced by Pitchfork.tv, consisted of archival footage and photographs of the band.

The album's title track was used during the final minutes of How I Met Your Mother's series finale, "Last Forever".

== Reception ==
Professional ratings
Aggregate scores
Source	Rating
AnyDecentMusic?	7.9/10
Metacritic	80/100
Review scores
Source	Rating
AllMusic	4/5 stars
The A.V. Club	A−
Entertainment Weekly	B+
The Independent	3/5 stars
NME	8/10
Pitchfork	8.1/10
Q	4/5 stars
Rolling Stone	3.5/5 stars
Spin	6/10
Uncut	8/10

Heaven was released to critical acclaim.

AllMusic's Heather Phares gave the album a positive review, writing "[..] [E]ven if it's not the band's most cohesive work, Heaven comes across as a more or less triumphant culmination of the Walkmen's first decade, and the fact that happiness fits the band better than anyone could have expected is just a welcome bonus." In another positive review, Sarah McCarty of Paste wrote that while the later tracks were weaker, "Heaven is a testament to The Walkmen’s triumph. After a decade, disappointment no longer possesses the power to defeat them. The Walkmen survive. They can’t be beat." The A.V. Club's Steven Hyden, referring to how all the band members were fathers, wrote "Heaven is a dad-rock record in a different, truer sense. It’s an album of big adult themes: the weight of responsibility, the realization that romantic infatuation is fleeting and probably bullshit, the power of fidelity and loyalty to outlast momentary sensation and passion." Hyden concluded: "After 10 years and seven albums, Heaven finds The Walkmen in a better place."

While still giving a positive review, PopMatters' Matthew Fiander criticized Heaven for being "[..] a bit too schmaltzy," writing, "You can’t fault Leithauser for singing so sweetly to his daughter on 'Song for Leigh' or to his best friend on 'Heaven', but the declarations of those songs feel insular, only for that one person, and the rest of us are left to merely listen in." Ben Schumer of Under the Radar also criticized the album in an otherwise positive review, writing "After 10 years together, a band typically grows more polished and mature, but it's difficult not to feel that something essential and elemental to The Walkmen's aesthetic is missing from most of Heaven - that palpable sense of urgency on display throughout their catalogue is on display far too little."

The album was listed eighth on Stereogum's list of top 50 albums of 2012.

== Track listing ==
All tracks written by The Walkmen.

1. "We Can't Be Beat" – 4:43
2. "Love Is Luck" – 3:26
3. "Heartbreaker" – 3:15
4. "The Witch" – 3:33
5. "Southern Heart" – 3:01
6. "Line by Line" – 5:05
7. "Song for Leigh" – 3:38
8. "Nightingales" – 4:03
9. "Jerry Jr.'s Tune" – 1:33
10. "The Love You Love" – 3:07
11. "Heaven" – 4:26
12. "No One Ever Sleeps" – 2:42
13. "Dreamboat" – 4:35

== Personnel ==
The following people contributed to Heaven:

=== The Walkmen ===
- Matt Barrick
- Peter Bauer
- Paul Maroon
- Walter Martin
- Hamilton Leithauser

=== Additional musicians ===
- Robin Pecknold - backing vocals (1, 9, 12 and 13)
- Morgan Henderson - additional percussion (11)
- Victoria Parker - strings (3 and 6)
- Jen Kozel - strings (3 and 6)
- Erika Pierson - strings (3 and 6)
- Jenn Glenn - strings (3 and 6)

=== Recording personnel ===
- Greg Calbi - Mastering
- Phil Ek - Engineer, Mixing, Producer
- Jonathan Eshak - Management
- Arno Frugier - Photography
- Morgan Henderson - Percussion
- Steve Huyne - Make-Up
- Jen Kozel - Strings
- Tamara McNaughton - Hair Stylist
- Cameron Nicklaus - Assistant Engineer
- Victoria Parker - Strings
- Elizabeth Spiridakis - Design
- Jerry Streeter - Assistant Engineer

== Charts ==
Chart (2012)	Peak position
US Billboard 200	30
US Rock Albums	15
US Independent Albums	8
US Alternative Albums	9
