= Brandy Alexander (disambiguation) =

Brandy Alexander is a sweet, brandy-based cocktail.

Brandy Alexander may also refer to:

== People ==
- Brandi Alexander, American professional wrestler
- Brandi Alexander, Canadian model featured in Canada's Next Top Model, Cycle 1
- Greg Alexander, former Australian rugby league footballer who is known by the nickname "Brandy"

== Fictional characters ==
- Brandy Alexander, a major character in the 1999 novel Invisible Monsters by Chuck Palahniuk

== Music ==
- "Brandy Alexander", a song written by Feist and Ron Sexsmith
  - Recorded by Feist for her 2007 album The Reminder
  - Recorded by Sexsmith for his 2008 album Exit Strategy of the Soul
- "Brandy Alexander", a song by The Walkmen from A Hundred Miles Off
