= Loop de Loop =

Single by Johnny Thunder

from the album Loop de Loop
- B-side: "Don't Be Ashamed"
- Released: December 1962
- Genre: R&B
- Length: 2:12
- Label: Diamond
- Songwriters: Teddy Vann, Joe Dong
- Producer: Teddy Vann

Johnny Thunder singles chronology
"Tell Her" (1962)	"Loop de Loop" (1962)	"Rock-A-Bye My Darling" (1963)

"Loop de Loop" is a song written by Teddy Vann and Joe Dong and performed by Johnny Thunder featuring The Bobbettes. It reached No. 4 on the U.S. pop chart and No. 6 on the U.S. R&B chart in 1963. It was featured on his 1963 album Loop De Loop. In Canada it reached No. 14 in 2 separate weeks.

The recording was produced by Teddy Vann, and it was Thunder's only Top 40 hit. The chorus is taken almost in whole from the popular folk song or children's song, known by various names, including "Here we go Loop de Loop."

== Other charting versions ==
- Frankie Vaughan released the song as a single in 1963 which reached No. 5 on the UK Singles Chart, No. 9 in Ireland, and No. 5 in Norway.

== Other versions ==
- French group Les Fantômes - as an instrumental in 1963
- French group Martin Circus - in 1976, as a single with French lyrics titled "Si tu me loupes"
- Donald Lautrec - as a single in 1963
- Bobby Rydell - on his 1963 album, All the Hits, Vol. 2.
- Frank Alamo - on a 1963 EP.
- Dalida - on her 1963 album, Eux.
- The Liverbirds - as a single in 1966.
- Harry Nilsson - featuring the Masked Alberts Kids Chorale, as the B-side to his 1974 single "Don't Forget Me". It was featured on his album, Pussy Cats.
- The Walkmen - on their 2006 album, "Pussy Cats" Starring the Walkmen.
- Brian Auger and the Trinity with Soul Sisters - on their 2017 live EP, June 3rd 1965.
