= Matt Oliver =

American indie rock musician

- Born: Matthew Oliver; June 14, 1979 (age 47)
- Origin: Houston, Texas; United States
- Genres: Indie rock, folk rock, rock, psychedelic pop
- Instruments: Vocals, guitar, piano
- Years active: 2000–present
- Labels: Capitol Records; Parlophone; Mexican Summer; Downtown; Visible Hand; Canvasback Music; Blood and Biscuits; Rough Trade

Matt Oliver (born June 14, 1979), is an American musician and producer. Oliver is a former member of indie rock bands Sound Team and TV Torso and has toured extensively with The Walkmen's Hamilton Leithauser. Oliver's engineering credits include sessions with Bill Callahan , The Strange Boys, Ola Podrida, Dungen , Future Islands, Daniel Johnston, Jon Spencer, Los Lobos, Mike Watt, J Mascis, Shabazz Palaces, Hundred Visions, Theophilus London, Ty Segall, Wire, and Wild Beasts.

== Selected discography ==
=== With TV Torso ===
- Days of Being Wild b/w I Can See Your Face – 7-inch vinyl/MP3/FLAC digital download (2009; Self-released)
- The Black Mask b/w The Eye in the Pyramid – 7-inch vinyl/MP3/FLAC digital download (2009; Visible Hand)
- Status Quo Vadis EP – 12" vinyl/MP3/FLAC digital download (2009; Visible Hand)
- Clear Lake Strangler EP – MP3/FLAC digital download (2009; Visible Hand)

=== Collaborations ===
==== Producer-Engineer-Mixer-Instrumentalist ====
- The Strange Boys Be Brave single – Engineer – CD/7-inch (2010; In the Red (US), Rough Trade (UK))
- Austin Leonard Jones Sundowners – CD/LP (2011; Jerry Jeff Stalker)
- Daniel Johnston True Love Will Find You in the End single – Engineer – (2012) Weeds Original Soundtrack
- Matthew and the Atlas EP – Produce/Engineer/Mix – CD/LP (2012; Communion (UK))
- Love Inks, Generation Club – Mixer – CD/LP (2013; Monofonus Press)
- White Denim Corsicana Lemonade – Electric Piano, Piano, Synthesizer – LP, CD, MP3 (2013; Downtown (US), PIAS (Australia))
- Ola Podrida Ghosts Go Blind – Produce/Engineer – CD/LP (2013; Western Vinyl)
- Tiger Waves Weekends b/w Sundressed – Produce/Engineer/Mix – 7-inch/MP3 (2013; Canvasback Music)
- Chief Scout "See" EP – Co-Produce/Engineer – (2014; Columbia)
- Peter Matthew Bauer Liberation! – Co-produce, Arrange, Guitar, Mix – LP, CD, MP3 (2014; Mexican Summer (US), Memphis Industries (UK))
- Bop English Constant Bop – Co Produce, Arrange, Guitar, Piano, Electric Piano, Synthesizer, Tape effects – LP, CD, MP3 (2015; Blood and Biscuits (UK), Downtown (US))

==== Live to 2-track Tape for Daytrotter ====
- Neon Indian – MP3/FLAC – Engineer/Mix – December 4, 2009
- Mark Olson & Gary Louris – MP3/FLAC – Engineer/Mix – July 1, 2009
- Daniel Johnston – MP3/FLAC – Engineer/Mix – January 10, 2010
- Liars – MP3/FLAC – Engineer/Mix – July 19, 2010
- Matt Morris – MP3/FLAC – Engineer/Mix/Master – July 22, 2010
- Man or Astro-man? – MP3/FLAC – Engineer/Mix/Master – July 29, 2010
- Javelin – MP3/FLAC – Engineer/Mix – August 12, 2010
- Danny Barnes – MP3/FLAC – Engineer/Mix – August 14, 2010
- The Depreciation Guild – MP3/FLAC – Engineer/Mix – August 24, 2010
- White Mystery – MP3/FLAC – Engineer/Mix – September 15, 2010
- The Black Angels – MP3/FLAC – Engineer/Mix – November 12, 2010
- Alejandro Escovedo – MP3/FLAC – Engineer/Mix – November 15, 2010
- Suuns – MP3/FLAC – Engineer/Mix – November 17, 2010
- Robert Randolph and the Family Band – MP3/FLAC – Engineer/Mix – November 22, 2010
- S. Carey – MP3/FLAC – Engineer/Mix – November 23, 2010
- No Joy – MP3/FLAC – Engineer/Mix – November 30, 2010
- Young the Giant – MP3/FLAC – Engineer/Mix – December 20, 2010
- Old 97's – MP3/FLAC – Engineer/Mix – December 21, 2010
- Ty Segall – MP3/FLAC – Engineer/Mix – December 28, 2010
- Twin Shadow – MP3/FLAC – Engineer/Mix – January 5, 2011
- Happy Birthday – MP3/FLAC – Engineer/Mix – January 7, 2011
- Dom – MP3/FLAC – Engineer/Mix – January 31, 2011
- Astronautalis – MP3/FLAC – Engineer/Mix – February 22, 2011
- Pete Yorn – MP3/FLAC – Engineer/Mix – February 24, 2011
- The Black – MP3/FLAC – Engineer/Mix – February 25, 2011
- Los Lobos – MP3/FLAC – Engineer/Mix – March 7, 2011
- Twilight Hotel – MP3/FLAC – Engineer/Mix – March 11, 2011
- Theophilus London – MP3/FLAC – Engineer/Mix – March 14, 2011
- Chris Brecht and Dead Flowers – MP3/FLAC – Engineer/Mix – March 16, 2011
- The Futureheads – MP3/FLAC – Engineer/Mix – March 17, 2011
- Railroad Earth – MP3/FLAC – Engineer/Mix – March 21, 2011
- Turbo Fruits – MP3/FLAC – Engineer/Mix – March 22, 2011
- Pink Nasty – MP3/FLAC – Engineer/Mix – March 27, 2011
- Soft Healer – MP3/FLAC – Engineer/Mix – March 31, 2011
- Mike and the Moonpies – MP3/FLAC – Engineer/Mix – April 9, 2011
- The Pains of Being Pure at Heart – MP3/FLAC – Engineer/Mix – April 9, 2011
- Yuck – MP3/FLAC – Engineer/Mix – April 11, 2011
- Hayes Carll – MP3/FLAC – Engineer/Mix – April 18, 2011
- The Get Up Kids – MP3/FLAC – Engineer/Mix – April 25, 2011
- Bill Callahan – MP3/FLAC – Engineer/Mix – April 27, 2011
- Busdriver – MP3/FLAC – Engineer/Mix – May 2, 2011
- Raphael Saadiq – MP3/FLAC – Engineer/Mix – May 3, 2011
- The Vaccines – MP3/FLAC – Engineer/Mix – May 4, 2011
- Atari Teenage riot – MP3/FLAC – Engineer/Mix – May 9, 2011
- Dashboard Confessional – MP3/FLAC – Engineer/Mix – May 13, 2011
- Dignan – MP3/FLAC – Engineer/Mix – May 15, 2011
- Josh T. Pearson – MP3/FLAC – Engineer/Mix – May 16, 2011
- MIddle Brother – MP3/FLAC – Engineer/Mix – May 18, 2011
- Reggie Watts – MP3/FLAC – Engineer/Mix – May 23, 2011
- Jesse Dayton – MP3/FLAC – Engineer/Mix – May 29, 2011
- Pujol – MP3/FLAC – Engineer/Mix – May 30, 2011
- Bass Drum of Death – MP3/FLAC – Engineer/Mix – June 1, 2011
- The Black Lips – MP3/FLAC – Engineer/Mix – June 8, 2011
- Sahara Smith – MP3/FLAC – Engineer/Mix – June 14, 2011
- The Coathangers – MP3/FLAC – Engineer/Mix – July 22, 2011
- My Education/Theta Naught – MP3/FLAC – Engineer/Mix – July 23, 2011
- The Death Set – MP3/FLAC – Engineer/Mix – July 25, 2011
- Matt the Electrician – MP3/FLAC – Engineer/Mix/Master – September 8, 2011
- J Mascis – MP3/FLAC – June 6, 2011
- Balmorhea – MP3/FLAC – June 22, 2011
- Laura Stevenson – MP3/FLAC – June 22, 2011
- Sleeping in the Aviary – MP3/FLAC – June 26, 2011
- Matthew and the Atlas – MP3/FLAC – July 5, 2011
- Seryn – MP3/FLAC – July 12, 2011
- Shabazz Palaces – MP3/FLAC – Engineer/Mix – July 13, 2011
- The Knux – MP3/FLAC – Engineer/Mix – August 3, 2011
- Asleep at the Wheel – MP3/FLAC – Engineer/Mix – August 11, 2011
- Teen Daze- MP3/FLAC – Engineer/Mix – August 13, 2011
- Love Inks – MP3/FLAC – Engineer/Mix – August 17, 2011
- Grouplove – MP3/FLAC – Engineer/Mix – August 18, 2011
- Fresh Millions – MP3/FLAC – Engineer/Mix – August 19, 2011
- Mount Kimbie – MP3/FLAC – Engineer/Mix – August 22, 2011
- Mister Heavenly – MP3/FLAC – Engineer/Mix – August 29, 2011
- Cerebral Ballzy – MP3/FLAC – Engineer/Mix – September 21, 2011
- Ume – MP3/FLAC – Engineer/Mix – September 24, 2011
- Asobi Seksu – MP3/FLAC – Engineer/Mix – September 27, 2011
- Mat Kearney – MP3/FLAC – Engineer/Mix – October 5, 2011
- Thursday – MP3/FLAC – Engineer/Mix – October 6, 2011
- Robert Ellis – MP3/FLAC – Engineer/Mix – October 21, 2011
- James McMurtry – MP3/FLAC – Engineer/Mix – October 28, 2011
- G. Love – MP3/FLAC – Engineer/Mix – November 1, 2011
- Mike Watt – MP3/FLAC – Engineer/Mix/Master – November 4, 2011
- Acrylics – MP3/FLAC – Engineer/Mix – November 7, 2011
- R. Stevie Moore – MP3/FLAC – Engineer/Mix – November 8, 2011
- Carl Broemel – MP3/FLAC – Engineer/Mix – November 9, 2011
- Future Islands – MP3/FLAC – Engineer/Mix – November 15, 2011
- P.S. I Love You – MP3/FLAC – Engineer/Mix – November 15, 2011
- Rx Bandits – MP3/FLAC – Engineer/Mix – November 16, 2011
- Frank Turner – MP3/FLAC – Engineer/Mix – November 17, 2011
- Autolux – MP3/FLAC – Engineer/Mix – November 18, 2011
- Salesman w/Wayne Kramer – MP3/FLAC – Engineer/Mix – November 19, 2011
- The Antlers – MP3/FLAC – Engineer/Mix/Master – November 23, 2011
- Surfer Blood – MP3/FLAC – Engineer/Mix/Master – November 25, 2011
- Crooked Fingers – MP3/FLAC – Engineer/Mix/Master – November 27, 2011
- Trevor Hall – MP3/FLAC – Engineer/Mix/Master – November 27, 2011
- White Dress – MP3/FLAC – Engineer/Mix/Master – November 29, 2011
- Cass McCombs – MP3/FLAC – Engineer/Mix/Master – November 29, 2011
- Ocote Soul Sounds – MP3/FLAC – Engineer/Mix/Master – December 3, 2011
- My Jerusalem – MP3/FLAC – Engineer/Mix/Master – December 5, 2011
- Charlie Faye – MP3/FLAC – Engineer/Mix – December 11, 2011
- Jon Spencer Blues Explosion – MP3/FLAC – Engineer/Mix – December 12, 2011
- Eastern Conference Champions – MP3/FLAC – Engineer/Mix – December 17, 2011
- Andrew Jackson Jihad – MP3/FLAC – Engineer/Mix – December 22, 2011
- The One AM Radio – MP3/FLAC – Engineer/Mix/Master – December 22, 2011
- Scott H. Biram – MP3/FLAC – Engineer/Mix/Master – December 26, 2011
- Moonhearts – MP3/FLAC – Engineer/Mix – January 1, 2012
- James Hand – MP3/FLAC – Engineer/Mix – January 3, 2012
- Efterklang – MP3/FLAC – Engineer/Mix – January 4, 2012
- The Gourds – MP3/FLAC – Engineer/Mix – January 5, 2012
- Royal Baths – MP3/FLAC – Engineer/Mix – January 7, 2012
- Residual Echoes – MP3/FLAC – Engineer/Mix – January 8, 2012
- Smith Westerns – MP3/FLAC – Engineer/Mix – January 10, 2012
- Dwarves – MP3/FLAC – Engineer/Mix – January 12, 2012
- Jacuzzi Boys – MP3/FLAC – Engineer/Mix – January 12, 2012
- The Stepkids – MP3/FLAC – Engineer/Mix – January 12, 2012
- Marnie Stern – MP3/FLAC – Engineer/Mix – January 27, 2012
- Nik Freitas – MP3/FLAC – Engineer/Mix – January 30, 2012
- The Cave Singers – MP3/FLAC – Engineer/Mix – January 30, 2012
- Eux Autres – MP3/FLAC – Engineer/Mix – February 4, 2012
- Corb Lund – MP3/FLAC – Engineer/Mix – February 15, 2012
- Gomez – MP3/FLAC – Engineer/Mix – February 16, 2012
- Little Hurricane – MP3/FLAC – Engineer/Mix – February 23, 2012
- One Hundred Flowers – MP3/FLAC – Engineer/Mix – February 23, 2012
- The Fiery Furnaces – MP3/FLAC – Engineer/Mix – February 29, 2012
- Noah and the Whale – MP3/FLAC – Engineer/Mix – February 29, 2012
- Avi Buffalo – MP3/FLAC – Engineer/Mix – March 13, 2012
- Bosque Brown – MP3/FLAC – Engineer/Mix – March 13, 2012
- Speak – MP3/FLAC – Engineer/Mix – March 16, 2012
- Rocky Votolato – MP3/FLAC – Engineer/Mix – March 22, 2012
- Beats Antique – MP3/FLAC – Engineer/Mix – March 20, 2012
- Band of Heathens – MP3/FLAC – Engineer/Mix – March 22, 2012
- The Raveonettes – MP3/FLAC – Engineer/Mix – March 30, 2012
- We Are Scientists – MP3/FLAC – Engineer/Mix – April 24, 2012
- Heavy Cream – MP3/FLAC – Engineer/Mix – April 27, 2012
- Dungen – MP3/FLAC – Engineer/Mix – April 27, 2012
- The Posies – MP3/FLAC – Engineer/Mix – May 2, 2012
- Lord Buffalo – MP3/FLAC – Engineer/Mix/Master – May 6, 2012
- Gold Panda – MP3/FLAC – Engineer/Mix – June 6, 2012
- Erin McKeown – MP3/FLAC – Engineer/Mix – June 7, 2012
- Martin Sexton – MP3/FLAC – Engineer/Mix – June 14, 2012
- Wild Beasts – MP3/FLAC – Engineer/Mix -August 14, 2012
- Sic Alps – MP3/FLAC – Engineer/Mix – February 21, 2012
- Chateau Marmont – MP3/FLAC – Engineer/Mix – February 27, 2012
- Carrie Rodriguez – MP3/FLAC – Engineer/Mix – November 12, 2012
- Wire – MP3/FLAC – Engineer/Mix – January 23, 2012

=== With Sound Team (2001–2007) ===
- Sound Team (Original Release) – CD-r (2000; Self-released)
- I'm Getting Laid Tonight b/w Folkswinger (7-inch single) – Vinyl (2000; Self-released)
- Into the Lens – CD-r (2001; Self-released)
- Yes Special Cassette – Cassette (2004; Self-released)
- Tour-only 4-song CD-r – CD-r (2005; Self-released)
- Marathon – 12" LP (2005; St. Ives/Secretly Canadian)
- WORK EP – CD/LP (2006; Capitol (US), Parlophone (UK))
- Movie Monster – CD/LP (2006; Capitol (US), Parlophone (UK))
- Born to Please – CD/7-inch UK-only single (2006; Parlophone)
- Empty Rooms – 12" LP (2007; Self-released)
