= Here we go Loop de Loop =

Nursery rhyme

Here we go Loop de Loop (a.k.a. "Looby Loo", "Loopty Loo", "Loop de Loo", or just "Dancing Looby") is a folk song and nursery rhyme for children.

== Origin ==
A version of the folk song appeared as early as 1849 in James Orchard Halliwell-Phillipps' Popular Rhymes and Nursery Tales, as "Dancing Looby". The song title eventually evolved into "Here We Go...: "Looby Loo", "Loopty Loo", "Loop de Loo", and "Loop de Loop".

== Lyrics and melody ==
The following are original lyrics from Dancing Looby:

Now we dance looby, looby, looby,
Now we dance looby, looby, light.
Shake your right hand a little
And turn you round about.

Now we dance looby, looby, looby,
Shake your right hand a little,
Shake your left hand a little,
And turn you round about.

The song continues with the same lyrics adding "Shake your right foot a little", "Shake your left foot a little", and "Shake your head a little." Children start by dancing in a circle, then stop and shake the body part when the lyric is mentioned. They then turn slowly around and continue dancing in a circle.

This is a modern children's version:

== In popular culture ==
The chorus of Johnny Thunder's 1963 hit song "Loop de Loop" featuring The Bobbettes is taken almost in whole from this song. The name was used for a ragdoll character in Andy Pandy who was regularly introduced with the song.
