= Fire It Up (Modest Mouse song) =

Song by Modest Mouse

from the album We Were Dead Before the Ship Even Sank
- Released: March 20, 2007
- Genre: Indie rock
- Length: 4:35
- Label: Epic Records
- Songwriters: Isaac Brock, Jeremiah Green, Eric Judy, Joe Plummer, Johnny Marr, Tom Peloso
- Producer: Dennis Herring

Music video
- "Fire It Up" on YouTube

Fire It Up is a song released by Modest Mouse on their album We Were Dead Before the Ship Even Sank.

== Trivia ==
Originally, people thought the song was about marijuana, but lead singer Isaac Brock said that this was not his intention. He told Rolling Stone: "I was saying 'Fire It Up' as in the sense of turning over a car." This is referenced in the line "Fire It Up, Fire It Up, when we fix the carburator, then we'll push off once again in an hour or so later."

== Video contest ==
In 2007 Modest Mouse filmed videos in front of greenscreen for three songs off of We Were Dead Before the Ship Even Sank (We've Got Everything, Missed the Boat, and Fire It Up). The footage was released to the public as a contest for fans to create videos. The winner was announced on July 10 as David Naylor.
