= Fire It Up =

Fire It Up may refer to:

- Fire It Up (Rick James album), 1979, and the title track
- Fire It Up (EP), a 1993 EP by Kid Rock
- Fire It Up (Tinsley Ellis album), 1997
- Fire It Up (Kottonmouth Kings album), 2004
- "Fire It Up" (Black Label Society song), 2005
- "Turn It Up" (Remix)/"Fire It Up", a 1998 rap song from rapper Busta Rhymes
- "Fire It Up" (Thousand Foot Krutch song)
- Fire It Up (Modest Mouse song), 2007
- Fire It Up (X-Sinner album), 2006
- Fire It Up (Johnny Reid album), 2012
  - "Fire It Up" (Johnny Reid song), the title track
- Fire It Up (Joe Cocker album), 2012
- Fire It Up (Steve Cropper album), 2021
- Fire It Up, album by Gord Bamford, 2023
- "Fire It Up", a song by Disturbed from the band's 2015 album Immortalized
- "Fire It Up", a song by Jonah Prill which represented Montana in the American Song Contest
- Fire It Up, a 2008 mix album, and a radio podcast show, both by DJ Eddie Halliwell
- "Fire It Up", a storyline in the science fiction comedy webtoon series Live with Yourself!
