= The Sunshine Factory =

American noise pop and psychedelic rock band

The Sunshine Factory is a three-member shoegaze/noise pop/psychedelic rock band from Mobile, Alabama currently consisting of Ian Taylor, Sally Robertson, and Clay Bates. The group has two albums to their credit: Vintage Revolution (2009) and Sugar (2010);.

The Sunshine Factory started as a collaborative effort between Ian Taylor and his father and lyricist, Robert Taylor. Forming in the wake of their former project, "The Ellen", Robert and Ian wanted to make a self-contained project which could not be affected by outside parties. The final pieces of the puzzle came with Robertson joining on bass and vocals in 2010—and more recently, drummer Clay Bates. The Sunshine Factory has recorded two full lengths and three singles. Performing live as a trio, T.S.F. produce an all en-composing sensory overload of light, video, and sound.

The band's video "Twisted and Clover" from the Sugar album was featured on Popmatters.com, which referred to the music as "distortion-fueled pop." In advance of the Sugar release, "My Sugar Cane" from that album was featured as "song of the day" on October 21, 2010 on futuresounds.com.

The band began recording at Sweet Tea Recording Studio with producer, Dennis Herring late September 2012.
