= Bows + Arrows =

Studio album by The Walkmen
- Released: February 3, 2004
- Recorded: April–October 2003
- Studios: Easley-McCain, Memphis; Marcata Recording, New York; Sweet Tea Recording, Oxford; The Magic Shop, New York
- Genres: Indie rock; post-punk revival; garage rock revival
- Length: 42:35
- Label: Record Collection
- Producer: The Walkmen

The Walkmen chronology
Everyone Who Pretended to Like Me Is Gone (2002)	Bows + Arrows (2004)	A Hundred Miles Off (2006)

Singles from Bows + Arrows
- 1. "The Rat" Released: April 19, 2004; 2. "Little House of Savages" Released: June 28, 2004

Professional ratings
Aggregate scores
Source	Rating
Metacritic	78/100
Review scores
Source	Rating
AllMusic	4/5 stars
Alternative Press	3/5
Chicago Sun-Times	3/4 stars
Entertainment Weekly	A
Mojo	3/5 stars
NME	8/10
Pitchfork	9.2/10
Q	4/5 stars
Rolling Stone	2/5 stars
Uncut	4/5 stars

Bows + Arrows is the second studio album by the American rock band the Walkmen, released on February 3, 2004, by Record Collection.

The album was self-produced aside from one song, "The Rat," produced by Dave Sardy. The album received a great deal of critical acclaim, appearing on several critics' year-end lists. "Little House of Savages" and "What's in It for Me" were both included on hit FOX teen drama The O.C. "The Rat" was named Pitchfork's No. 6 single of the year. "The Rat" was selected for the playlist on the video game Major League Baseball 2K7. "The Rat" was listed at No. 20 on Pitchfork's top 500 songs of the 2000s and at No. 13 on NME's top 100 songs of the 2000s.

== Track listing ==
All songs written by The Walkmen.

1. "What's in It for Me" – 2:53
2. "The Rat" – 4:27
3. "No Christmas While I'm Talking" – 4:30
4. "Little House of Savages" – 3:15
5. "My Old Man" – 4:46
6. "138th Street" – 3:02
7. "The North Pole" – 3:48
8. "Hang On, Siobhan" – 3:45
9. "New Year's Eve" – 2:20
10. "Thinking of a Dream I Had" – 4:33
11. "Bows + Arrows" – 5:16

== Personnel ==
- Hamilton Leithauser – vocals, guitars
- Paul Maroon – guitars, piano
- Walter Martin – organ, pandemonium
- Peter Bauer – bass
- Matt Barrick – drums

== Singles ==
- "The Rat" (April 19, 2004)
  - US 7" vinyl: "The Rat" / "Clementine"
- "Little House of Savages" (June 28, 2004)
  - UK CD1: "Little House of Savages" / "Fly into Mystery"
  - UK CD2: "Little House of Savages" / "Wake Up" / "Revenge Wears No Wristwatch" / "Little House of Savages" (enhanced video)
