= Amie Street =

Online music store from 2006-2010

- Amie Street logo

- Amie Street homepage
- Launched: United States: July 4, 2006; Japan: December 11, 2007
- Platforms: Web-based, platform-independent (Microsoft Windows, Mac OS/X, or Linux)
- Pricing model: Variable (demand-based), à la carte
- Availability: Worldwide for most tracks, some tracks are only available in the United States or Japan
- Website: amiestreet.com

Amie Street was an indie online music store and social network service created in 2006 by Brown University seniors Elliott Breece, Elias Roman, and Joshua Boltuch, in Providence, Rhode Island. The site was notable for its demand-based pricing. The company was later moved to Long Island City in Queens, New York. In late 2010, the site was sold to Amazon who redirected customers to their own website.

== History ==
Founded in early 2006, Amie Street opened to the public with a pre-alpha version on July 4, 2006, and was quickly scooped by Michael Arrington of TechCrunch. It grew and creating partnerships with various record labels including CD Baby, The Orchard, Nettwerk Music Group, and Daptone Records. A beta version was launched on October 4, 2006. On December 11, 2007, Amie Street Japan launched in partnership with Turbolinux.

On August 5, 2007, Amie Street announced a site redesign and, led by Amazon.com, closed their Series A round of venture capital funding. Notable angel investors include Robin Richards, former president of MP3.com and David Hirsch, director of Google's B2B vertical markets group.

In an email to Amie Street members on September 8, 2010, the website announced it would be redirecting all customers to Amazon.com starting on September 22, 2010, and ceasing to operate as amiestreet.com. Amie Street members had until September 22 to spend any credit they currently have with Amie Street, as it did not transfer to Amazon. Amazon shut down Amie Street soon after.

== Website features ==
Artists could upload their music directly to the site in MP3 format at whatever quality bit rate they choose, but when a record label or music distributor requires Amie Street to encode the music, they strive to achieve an average bit rate of 256 kbit/s using a variable bitrate. (Other formats such as AAC, FLAC, and Ogg are "on the way.") As users buy songs, the artist is credited quarterly. Artists keep 70% of the proceeds after US$5 in sales for each song. Albums were priced at the current total cost for each individual song on the album, capped at US$8.98 in most cases. PayPal, Payoneer prepaid MasterCards, or checks were used to make payments to artists.

Amie Street used an algorithm to determine song prices based on demand. The price for a track started at zero when a song was uploaded, then rose according to demand and purchases of the song. The maximum price was 98¢.

A ringtone service was announced on September 17, 2007, with variable pricing.

On May 15, 2007, the web series lonelygirl15 teamed up with Amie Street to sell music featured in episodes of the show.

=== RECs ===
Non-artist users could earn credit as well. They did this by RECing a song. When a user finds a song they believe will be a hit, they can REC it. If the song price increased from the moment they REC it, they will receive compensation based on the price increase. For example, if one RECs a song currently at 5¢ and it rises to 95¢, the user will cash out half the spread: 45¢ $=(\tfrac{95-5}{2})$, just for RECing the song. If a user RECs a song when it is free, they are compensated with the full spread. RECing differentiates more popular music from less, as songs that are believed to be good will be RECed more often. Users get approximately 1 REC for every US$1 of Amie Street credit they purchase.

=== Social networking ===
Users could connect with other users through the "friend" feature. RECs were sent out to friends to make it easier to find new music in a music "news feed". There was also a "fan" feature so users can easily connect with bands on the site. All of this information was available as separate RSS web feeds.

==== Third party integration ====
Amie Street launched a Facebook Application in October 2007 called Fantasy Record Label. This application allowed Facebook users to create a "record label" with a collection of songs that were linked with an Amie Street account, and post the label on their Facebook profile page. Songs were ranked and as their score changed, each user's label would gain or lose points. These points could be converted into Amie Street credit and could be used to purchase music. Labels were also ranked and users were able to compete against each other for bragging rights.

=== Download To Make A Difference campaign ===
On July 16, 2008, Amie Street launched "Download To Make A Difference", a benefit media campaign, donating money to charities for certain downloads. On July 29, 2008, Amie Street expanded the program with the exclusive release of You & Me an album by NYC indie rock band The Walkmen, giving proceeds to Memorial Sloan-Kettering Cancer Center. During its first week of sales, the album charted at #29 on Billboard's Top Digital Albums.

== Press ==
Amie Street was mentioned in several notable media organizations. These include Rolling Stone, The Wall Street Journal, BusinessWeek, NPR, The Washington Post, Los Angeles Times, Entertainment Weekly, TechCrunch, Boing Boing, Ars Technica, and Wired.

=== Ashley Alexandra Dupré ===
In March 2008, the site received additional attention because of the availability of two singles by Ashley Alexandra Dupré, the call girl at the center of the Eliot Spitzer prostitution scandal. An unsigned singer, her single "Move Ya Body" set a record for how fast it commanded the top price on the site following Dupré's identity as the call girl "Kristen" being revealed by The New York Times on March 12, 2008. While some speculated that she may have earned as much as US$300,000 - US$1.4 million from download sales of her singles on Amie Street, others estimated her earnings to be as low as US$13,720. Official sales numbers have not been released.

== See also ==
- Crowdsourcing
- Silicon Alley
- Social commerce
- Songza
- The Cult of Sincerity
- Web 2.0
