= We Were Dead Before the Ship Even Sank =

Studio album by Modest Mouse
- Released: March 20, 2007
- Recorded: 2005–2006
- Studios: Sweet Tea (Oxford, Mississippi); Audible Alchemy (Portland, Oregon)
- Genres: Indie rock, post-punk revival, indie pop, alternative rock
- Length: 62:28
- Label: Epic
- Producer: Dennis Herring

Modest Mouse chronology
Baron von Bullshit Rides Again (2004)	We Were Dead Before the Ship Even Sank (2007)	No One's First, and You're Next (2009)

Singles from We Were Dead Before the Ship Even Sank
- 1. "Dashboard" Released: January 16, 2007; 2. "Missed the Boat" Released: May 1, 2007; 3. "We've Got Everything" Released: October 2, 2007; 4. "Little Motel" Released: October 11, 2007; 5. "People as Places as People" Released: 2007

We Were Dead Before the Ship Even Sank is the fifth studio album by American alternative rock band Modest Mouse, released in 2007. It followed their previous studio album, 2004's Good News for People Who Love Bad News. It is the band's only full-length with former The Smiths guitarist Johnny Marr as well as Joe Plummer as members. It is also their last with founding member and bassist Eric Judy. It has a strong nautical theme and was originally envisioned as a concept album about a boat crew that dies in every song.

This album was certified Gold by the RIAA on June 11, 2009. As of February 2015, it has sold 649,000 copies in the US.

== Production ==
The album was recorded at Sweet Tea Studio in Oxford, Mississippi, with producer Dennis Herring, becoming the second consecutive Modest Mouse album to be recorded at that location and with that producer. Audible Alchemy in Portland, Oregon, was also credited as a recording studio for the album. The original drummer for Modest Mouse, Jeremiah Green, also returned to the band for this album. Additionally, James Mercer of The Shins sings backup vocals on the tracks "We've Got Everything", "Missed the Boat", and "Florida".

The album was leaked to the Internet on February 15, 2007, a full month before its official release on March 20, 2007. In its first week of release, the album debuted at No. 1 in the Billboard 200 selling 128,585 copies.

The album also reached No. 1 in Canada, where it was certified gold in June 2008 and sold 50,000 copies.

=== Johnny Marr's contribution ===
In an interview, Isaac Brock said of Johnny Marr: "He made a cautious commitment to write and record with us, and then the tighter we got, he was like, 'okay, let's tour too.' Then he was pretty much a member of the band—not pretty much; he's a full blown member of the band. It's really fuckin' nice." According to Brock, Marr was involved in songwriting on the album, and would tour with the band in support of it. In the interview, Brock described We Were Dead... as a "nautical balalaika carnival romp". Johnny Marr later responded to Brock's comments by saying "Isaac contacted me and asked if I'd help Modest Mouse write the new album. I was intrigued and played with the band in Portland a couple of times. We hit it off and wrote three great songs straight away, something clicked, it felt right from the off. I have a new Healers album pretty much done, but we've been having such a good time playing these new Modest Mouse songs. When people hear the record they'll see why, we're very good together."

== Release details ==
The album was originally intended to be released in the United States and Canada on December 19, 2006, but in an e-mail sent to members of Modest Mouse's mailing list on October 6, 2006, the album was pushed back: "The forthcoming record We Were Dead Before the Ship Even Sank is set for release early next year...". It was pushed back until March 20, 2007, and released on April 2, 2007 in Ireland and the United Kingdom. The album was also released in Australia on March 17 and Germany on March 30.

Two CD versions of the album were released for purchase: the regular version, which comes in a standard jewel case, and the deluxe digipak version which "includes a digipack and a 32-page full color booklet all packaged in a deluxe slipcase" made of canvas. The Sony Music website also offers a double gatefold (2 LP) 180-gram vinyl edition of the album.

=== Singles ===
The first single released from the album was "Dashboard" in January 2007. It was first sent to members of the Modest Mouse e-mail list on January 3 and is still present on the band's media player on their official Myspace page. The song was released to radio on January 16, and made available at the iTunes Store on January 29.

The second single was "Missed the Boat", with the video being directed by Christopher Mills (who also directed the "Float On" video). It peaked at No. 24.

The third single is "Little Motel". The video was shown on the official Modest Mouse YouTube channel on October 11, 2007.

"People as Places as People" was the final single released from the album. The music video featured a woman bringing her husband, a humanoid tree, to visit her parents.

== Reception ==
Professional ratings
Aggregate scores
Source	Rating
Metacritic	78/100
Review scores
Source	Rating
AllMusic	3/5 stars
The A.V. Club	A−
Entertainment Weekly	A−
The Guardian	4/5 stars
Los Angeles Times	3/4 stars
NME	7/10
Pitchfork	7.8/10
Q	4/5 stars
Rolling Stone	3.5/5 stars
Spin	4/5 stars

The album holds a score of 78 out of 100 from Metacritic based on "generally favorable reviews". The A.V. Club gave it an A− and said, "Easier than ever to grasp, yet still constantly, joyously vexing, We Were Dead is another terrific set from a band that couldn't make something dull even if drowning were the only other option." Under the Radar gave it a score of nine stars out of ten and said it was "Not just an album that revisits the dancey guitar-pop that made "Float On" an unlikely No. 1 hit, but sharpens and emboldens it for [Modest Mouse's] most accessible album to date." Blender gave it four-and-a-half stars out of five and said, "Is there another 'Float On'? It scarcely matters: 10 years into their career, Modest Mouse have stumbled into their best album yet." The Austin Chronicle gave it four stars out of five and said the album "sounds like Modest Mouse, only better." Mojo also gave it four stars out of five and called it "a winner". Uncut likewise gave it four stars out of five and said it "adds a newfound sang-froid to [the band's] quiet/loud approach." Q also gave it four stars and called it "a fantastic voyage". Spin gave it a score of eight out of ten and stated, "While Brock's pop instincts have never been more refined, his jitteriness has never run more rampant." Alternative Press gave it four stars out of five and said that "Much of [the album] feels like a culmination of the sound that Modest Mouse have spent the last decade or so honing." musicOMH also gave it four stars out of five and said of Modest Mouse, "This is a band working at the very top of their game, and this album is a beautiful, brilliant beast." Billboard gave it a favorable review and stated, "There's more melody than usual to be found here." The Hartford Courant also gave it a favorable review and called it "a successful experiment... largely because the differences between Marr and Mouse turn out to be more harmonious than anyone could have expected."

Almost Cool gave the album a score of 7.25 out of ten and said that it was "not as excellent as [the band's] early work, but still pretty entertaining." Yahoo! Music UK gave it seven stars out of ten and stated, "The problem is, there's simply too much record here." Playlouder gave it three-and-a-half stars out of five and said it "could be Modest Mouse's finest hour were it not a little long - the nuances are occasionally rather swamped by the effort of listening to the hour-long record through." Slant Magazine also gave it three-and-a-half stars out of five and called it "a really good, if not necessarily phenomenal, rock record." The Boston Globe gave it a positive review and said that if the album "is a little much to take in all at once, the sheer mass of the tunes becomes easier to manage over repeated listens." LAS Magazine gave the album a score of 6.8 out of ten and said, "A disproportionate amount of the album's tracks sound like a commercialized knockoff of previous songs, past highlights revisited after a process of radio ready distillation." Prefix Magazine gave it 6.5 out of ten and called the album "exhausting".

Other reviews are average or mixed: Now gave the album a score of three stars out of five and said, "The album as a whole does drag on, and the songs aren't as immediately grabby as those on their last disc, but We Were Dead is more interesting and varied than Good News." Hot Press also gave it a score of three out of five and said it had "some excellent moments". The Village Voice gave it an average review and said, "Imagine the cheerful fatalism of "Float On" without the hooks, which is bizarre: Hooks would seem to be Marr's specialty."

== Track listing ==
All lyrics are written by Isaac Brock; all music is composed by Modest Mouse (Brock, Jeremiah Green, Eric Judy, Johnny Marr, Tom Peloso, and Joe Plummer), except where noted.

No.	Title	Music	Length
1.	"March into the Sea"		3:30
2.	"Dashboard"		4:06
3.	"Fire It Up"		4:34
4.	"Florida"	Brock, Green, Judy, Marr, Plummer	2:56
5.	"Parting of the Sensory"		5:34
6.	"Missed the Boat"		4:24
7.	"We've Got Everything"		3:40
8.	"Fly Trapped in a Jar"		4:30
9.	"Education"	Brock, Green, Judy, Marr, Peloso	3:56
10.	"Little Motel"		4:44
11.	"Steam Engenius"		4:26
12.	"Spitting Venom"		8:26
13.	"People as Places as People"		3:42
14.	"Invisible"		4:00
Total length:			62:28

Japanese CD Bonus Track
No.	Title	Length
15.	"King Rat"	5:30
Total length:		52:00

== Bonus material ==
- A behind the scenes look into the making of the "Dashboard" video entitled "A Fisherman's Tale" was included with iTunes Store pre-orders of the album and the Japanese limited edition two-disc set.
- A 7-inch vinyl single featuring the unreleased track "King Rat" with album track "Fire It Up" as the B-side was included with the pre-order of the album at certain retailers. Japanese edition also have "King Rat" as bonus track.
- US Best Buy stores offered a pre-sell CD single with three tracks from the album. It was made available on March 7, two weeks prior to the release of the album and contained the tracks "Dashboard", "Education", and "Little Motel". The single carried no title other than that of the 3 tracks. Unlike typical promotions of pre-sell material that contain coupons for some value off the final price of the album (this one was $1.99 - a reimbursement for the cost of the single, making it a free promotional tool), this CD featured only album quality tracks and no live or other unreleased tracks.

== Personnel ==
=== Modest Mouse ===
- Isaac Brock
- Jeremiah Green
- Eric Judy
- Johnny Marr
- Tom Peloso
- Joe Plummer

=== Additional personnel ===
- Produced by Dennis Herring
- Engineered by Joe Zook and Clay Jones
- Assisted by Tom Queyja and Rob Cooper
- Additional engineering by Kyle "Slick" Johnson, Reto Peter and Tom Queyja
- Mixed by Joe Zook and Dennis Herring
- Mastered by Howie Weinberg (Masterdisk, New York, NY)
- Lyrics by Isaac Brock
- Clay Jones – shaker on "Dashboard", programming on "Florida", acoustic guitar on "Missed the Boat"
- Dennis Herring – claps and stomps on "Parting of the Sensory", Rhodes on "Little Motel", backing vocals on "Steam Engenius", pump organ on "Spitting Venom"
- Kyle "Slick" Johnson – programming on "Dashboard", "Fire It Up", "Parting of the Sensory", "Little Motel" and "Invisible"
- Naheed Simjee – backing vocals on "Fire It Up", claps and stomps on "Parting of the Sensory"
- James Mercer – backing vocals on "Florida", "Missed the Boat" and "We've Got Everything"
- Art direction by Isaac Brock, Christian Helms and Nahjeed Simjee
- Design by Christian Helms and Geoff Peyeto at The Decoder Ring
- Booklet interior illustrations by David Ellis and Casey Burns

== Charts ==
=== Weekly charts ===
Chart (2007)	Peak position
Australian Albums (ARIA)	12
Canadian Albums (Billboard)	1
German Albums (Offizielle Top 100)	65
Irish Albums (IRMA)	22
Japanese Albums (Oricon)	130
New Zealand Albums (RMNZ)	26
Norwegian Albums (VG-lista)	22
UK Albums (Official Charts)	47
US Billboard 200	1
US Top Rock Albums (Billboard)	1
US Indie Store Album Sales (Billboard)	1

=== Year-end charts ===
Chart (2007)	Position
US Billboard 200	126

== Certifications ==
Region	Certification	Certified units/sales
Canada (Music Canada)	Gold	50,000^{^}
United States (RIAA)	Gold	500,000^{^}
^{^} Shipments figures based on certification alone.
