= Lisbon (The Walkmen album) =

Studio album by The Walkmen
- Released: September 14, 2010
- Studio: Gigantic, New York; Elmwood Recording, Dallas; Python's Palace, Philadelphia; Mick, New York; Brutalis, Philadelphia; Woody's, New York; Papi & Marisa's, Philadelphia
- Genre: Indie rock
- Length: 44:55
- Label: Fat Possum; Bella Union
- Producer: The Walkmen; John Congleton

The Walkmen chronology
You & Me (2008)	Lisbon (2010)	Heaven (2012)

Singles from Lisbon
- 1. "Angela Surf City" Released: October 4, 2010; 2. "Juveniles" Released: January 31, 2011; 3. "Woe Is Me" Released: September 5, 2011

Professional ratings
Aggregate scores
Source	Rating
AnyDecentMusic?	7.9/10
Metacritic	83/100
Review scores
Source	Rating
AllMusic	4/5 stars
The A.V. Club	A
The Guardian	4/5 stars
Mojo	4/5 stars
NME	9/10
Pitchfork	8.6/10
Q	4/5 stars
Rolling Stone	2.5/5 stars
Spin	8/10
Uncut	4/5 stars

Lisbon is the fifth studio album by the American rock band the Walkmen, released on September 14, 2010, by Fat Possum Records and Bella Union.

The band recorded nearly thirty tracks before settling on the eleven that comprise the album. The album is a tribute to the city of Lisbon in Portugal. Exclaim! named Lisbon as the No. 13 Pop & Rock Album of 2010. Pitchfork named it the No. 21 in their Top 50 Albums of 2010. By 2011, it had sold 39,159 copies in United States according to Nielsen SoundScan.

== Track listing ==
All tracks are written by The Walkmen.

Standard Edition
No.	Title	Length
1.	"Juveniles"	4:27
2.	"Angela Surf City"	3:23
3.	"Follow the Leader"	2:01
4.	"Blue as Your Blood"	4:16
5.	"Stranded"	4:27
6.	"Victory"	4:06
7.	"All My Great Designs"	4:42
8.	"Woe Is Me"	3:29
9.	"Torch Song"	4:07
10.	"While I Shovel the Snow"	4:00
11.	"Lisbon"	5:56
Total length:		44:55

Bonus disc track listing
No.	Title	Length
12.	"All Black and White"	2:47
13.	"Grateful"	3:52
14.	"Orange Sunday"	3:20
15.	"Paper House"	3:39
Total length:		58:30

== Personnel ==
Credits adapted from AllMusic.

Band

- Matt Barrick – drums
- Peter Bauer – organ, piano
- Walter Martin – bass guitar, percussion
- Hamilton Leithauser – guitar, vocals
- Paul Maroon – guitar, trumpet, viola

Additional musicians

- Alec Ounsworth – vocals
- Greg Glassman – trumpet
- Rachel Golub – violin
- Clara Kennedy – cello
- John Kozan – trombone
- Dana Lyn – violin
- Anna Stumpf – trumpet
- Kenny Warren – trumpet
- Alex Waterman – cello, transcription
- Mike Irwin – trumpet
- Kevin Moehringer– trombone
- Leyna Papach – violin
- Paul Brandenburg – trumpet
- Joe Ancowitz – trumpet

Production

- Greg Calbi – mastering
- John Congleton – engineer, mixing, producer
- Mark Endozo – assistant engineer
- Luigi Ghirri – cover photo
- Fred Maroon –inside photo
- Alex Aldi – second engineer
- Elizabeth Spiridakis – design
- Chris Zane – engineer, mixing
