= The Liverbirds =

English rock band

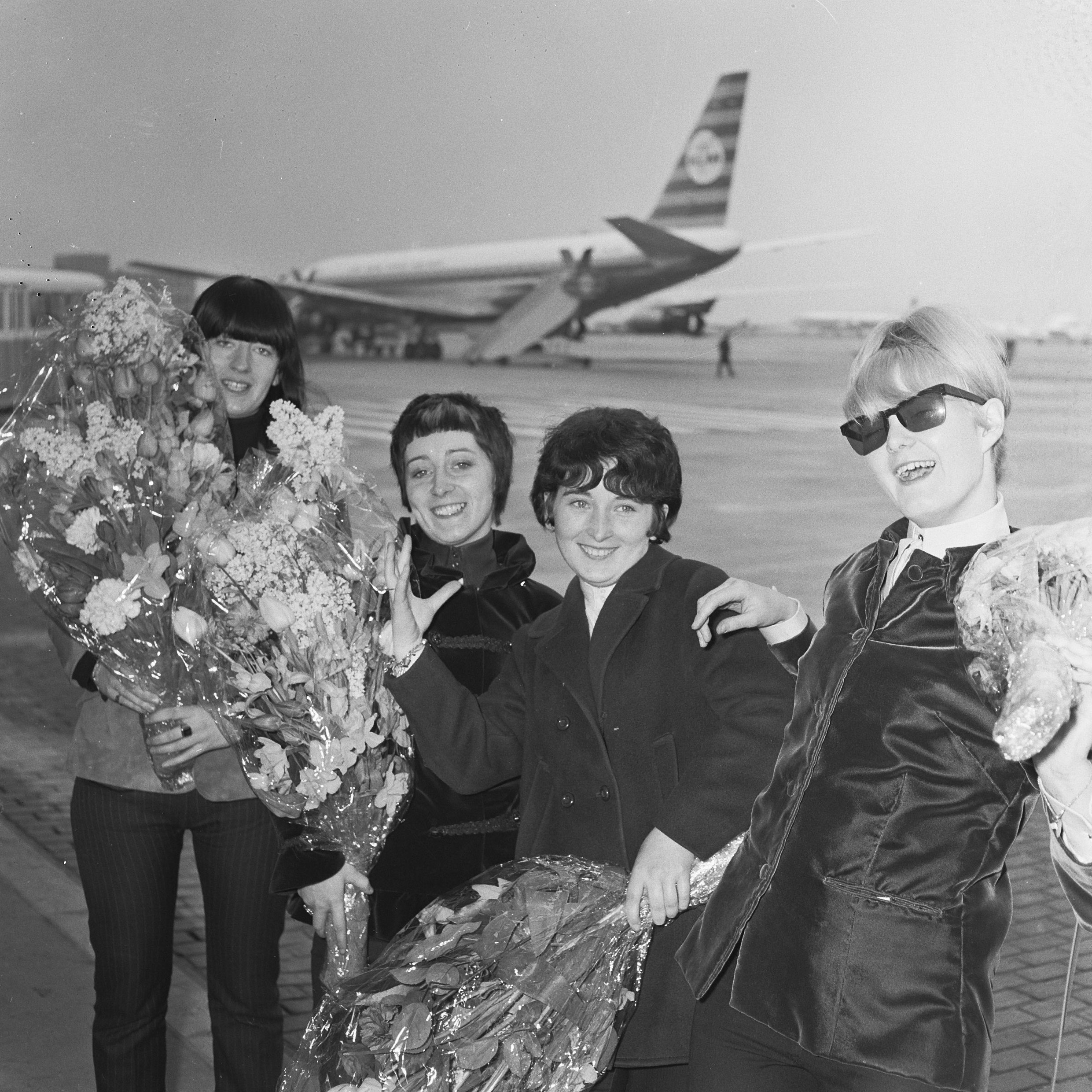
- The Liverbirds in April 1965; from left to right: Valerie Gell, Sylvia Saunders, Mary McGlory and Pamela Birch.

Background information
- Origin: Liverpool, England
- Genres: Merseybeat, R&B, rock and roll
- Years active: 1963–1968, 1998, 2026
- Label: Star-Club
- Members: Valerie Gell; Pamela Birch; Mary McGlory; Sylvia Saunders

The Liverbirds (/ˈlaɪvərbɜːrdz/) were an English all-female rock band from Liverpool, active between 1963 and 1968, then again in 1998 and 2026. The group originally consisted of vocalist and guitarist Valerie Gell, guitarist and vocalist Pamela Birch, bassist and vocalist Mary McGlory, and drummer Sylvia Saunders. They were one of the very few female bands on the Merseybeat scene, as well as one of the first all-female rock and roll bands in the world. They took their name from the fictional liver bird, which is the symbol of their native Liverpool. They were mostly a cover band, except for three of their songs being written by Pamela Birch.

== History ==
Gell, Saunders, and McGlory formed the band in 1963, along with guitarist Sheila McGlory (Mary's sister) and vocalist Irene Green, both of whom quickly left to join other bands and were replaced by Pamela Birch. According to Bruce Eder, the group formed in early 1962 as the Debutones. Irene Green left to join Tiffany's Dimensions and Sheila McGlory to the Demoiselles. They achieved more commercial success in Germany than their native Britain. Early in their career, they followed in the footsteps of fellow Liverpudlians the Beatles and made their way to Hamburg, where they performed at the Star-Club after the Beatles' own tenure and were billed as "the female Beatles". John Lennon of the Beatles told the group that "girls" were unable to play guitars. This remark motivated the band, and they proved him wrong as The Liverbirds became one of the top attractions at the Star-Club and released two albums and several singles on the club's own label. One of those singles, a cover of Bo Diddley's "Diddley Daddy", reached No. 5 on the German charts. The group broke up in 1968, just after finishing a tour of Japan. They briefly reunited in 1998.

Three members of the band settled in Germany permanently. Saunders moved to Spain, settling in Alicante with her husband, John (died 2 April 2017). Sylvia Saunders is now living in Glasgow. McGlory runs a Hamburg-based company called Ja/Nein Musikverlag ("Yes/No Music Publishing") which she founded with her husband, German songwriter Frank Dostal (died April 2017), who was one of the band's former colleagues from the Star-Club and later vice-chairman of the German performance rights organization GEMA. Birch also settled in Hamburg and worked for many years in the city's clubs. She died at the UKE on 27 October 2009, at the age of 65. Gell, who settled in Munich but later returned to Hamburg, died on 11 December 2016, aged 71.

Saunders and McGlory, the two surviving members of the band, published an autobiography The Liverbirds: Our life in Britain’s first female rock ‘n’ roll band in 2024. In 2026, Saunders and McGlory collaborated with American musicians Lisa Troyer and Dawn Yoder on new Liverbirds songs. "1964" was released as a single in April, and "Beautiful Love" in June.

== Members ==
- Valerie Gell – vocals, guitar (1963–1968, 1998; died 2016)
- Mary McGlory – vocals, bass (1963–1968, 1998)
- Sylvia Saunders – drums (1963–1968, 1998)
- Sheila McGlory – guitar (1963)
- Irene Green – vocals (1963)
- Pamela Birch – vocals, guitar (1963–1968, 1998; died 2009)

== Discography ==
=== Albums ===
- Star-Club Show 4 (1965)
- More of the Liverbirds (1966)

=== Compilations ===
- From Merseyside to Hamburg - The Complete Star-Club Recordings (2010), Big Beat CDWIKD 290 (features the 29 songs from both studio albums, though not in the order on the albums)

=== Singles ===
- "Shop Around"/"It's Got to Be You" (1964 or 1965)
- "Diddley Daddy"/"Leave All Your Loves in the Past" (1965)
- "Peanut Butter"/"Why Do You Hang Around Me" (1965)
- "Loop de Loop"/"Bo Diddley Is a Lover" (1966)
- “Love, love, love” (2024)
- "1964" (2026)
- "Beautiful Love" (2026)

=== Possible songs ===
Tablyrics.com lists some songs that are not known outside of the site. Their existence is unknown.

- "The Past"
- "Nobody But You"
- "Baby I Dig Love"
- "Tell Me"

== In other media ==
The story of the Liverbirds is the subject of the 2019 musical, Girls Don't Play Guitars, written by Ian Salmon and directed by Bob Eaton at the Royal Court Theatre, Liverpool. Founding members McGlory and Saunders have been involved with the production and join in the cast on stage for the encore. Also in 2019, The New York Times produced a sixteen-minute documentary about the band called We're Britain's First Female Rock Band. This is Why You Don't Know Us.. It featured surviving members McGlory and Saunders. It is also known as The Other Fab Four.
