= Pussy Cats =

Studio album by Harry Nilsson
- Released: August 19, 1974
- Recorded: March–May 1974
- Studios: Burbank Studios, Los Angeles, California; Record Plant, New York, New York
- Genres: Pop, rock
- Length: 37:08
- Label: RCA Victor
- Producer: John Lennon

Harry Nilsson chronology
Son of Dracula (1974)	Pussy Cats (1974)	Duit on Mon Dei (1975)

Singles from Pussy Cats
- 1. "Many Rivers to Cross" / "Don't Forget Me" Released: July 8, 1974 (US); September 13, 1974 (UK); 2. "Subterranean Homesick Blues" / "Mucho Mungo/Mt. Elga" Released: October 1, 1974 (US); 3. "Don't Forget Me" / "Loop de Loop" Released: December 9, 1974 (US); 4. "Save the Last Dance For Me" / "All My Life" Released: January 31, 1975 (UK)

Professional ratings
Review scores
Source	Rating
AllMusic	3.5/5 stars
Christgau's Record Guide	A−
The Essential Rock Discography	6/10
Pitchfork	7.8/10
The Rolling Stone Album Guide	4/5 stars

Pussy Cats is the tenth album by American singer Harry Nilsson, released by RCA Records in 1974. It was produced by John Lennon during his "Lost Weekend" period. The album title was inspired by the bad press Nilsson and Lennon were getting at the time for being drunk and rowdy in Los Angeles. They also included an inside joke on the cover – children's letter blocks "D" and "S" on either side of a rug under a table − to spell out "drugs under the table" as a rebus.

== Recording and development ==
The album was started in Los Angeles, but Lennon ultimately finished producing it in New York, where he could better control the sessions. During the recording sessions, Nilsson ruptured one of his vocal cords but chose to keep this from Lennon. He forced himself to push through the sessions, which caused even more damage, that some (including The Monkees' Micky Dolenz) say he never quite recovered from. The vocal strain is most evident on "Old Forgotten Soldier" (where he is noticeably off-key on some lines of the song, despite his slow and low bluesy vocals) and "Loop de Loop", on the latter of which Nilsson's vocals are heavily masked by backing vocals, which take the lead role towards the end.

The album's intended original title, Strange Pussies, was rejected by RCA Records and modified to Pussy Cats. Among the many musicians on Pussy Cats are Ringo Starr, Keith Moon and Jim Keltner, who all play drums on the closing track, "Rock Around the Clock". Other contributors include Jesse Ed Davis, Klaus Voormann, and Bobby Keys.

A quadrophonic version was released on record and eight-track tape. The songs were treated to special mixes for that issue of the album.

Half of the album's original ten tracks were covers while the rest were written by Nilsson (with Lennon co-writing "Mucho Mungo/Mt. Elga").

After the first night of recording, March 28, Paul McCartney and Stevie Wonder popped into the studio unexpectedly. Bootleg recordings from the session were later released as the album A Toot and a Snore in '74. It is the only known instance of Lennon and McCartney recording together since the break-up of the Beatles.

== Release ==
The album was released August 19, 1974, in the US and August 30, 1974, in the UK.

Longtime Beatles publicist Derek Taylor, who produced A Little Touch of Schmilsson in the Night, wrote the liner notes for the original Pussy Cats pressing. In it, he referred to the album's notorious recording background and quipped, "They [Harry and John] have been living a vampire timetable recently but have sucked no blood except each other's and not so much of that. Anyway, the cross-transfusion works, so what the hell." Lennon was annoyed that the Massed Albert Choir was listed in the credits as "Masked Albert Choir".

The album got a generally positive reception, peaking at #60 on the US Billboard album charts. Nilsson's subsequent RCA releases would chart far lower.

== Legacy ==
In June 1999, a commemorative 25th-anniversary edition of Pussy Cats was released.

In October 2006, a track-by-track cover of the album was released by indie rock band The Walkmen. Several covers of the song "Don't Forget Me" have appeared, including Marshall Crenshaw's treatment on the 1995 Nilsson tribute For the Love of Harry: Everybody Sings Nilsson, Neil Diamond's version closing out his Dreams album, alt-country artist Neko Case's March 2009 version on her ANTI- label release, Middle Cyclone, and Mamie Minch's contribution to 2014's tribute to Nilsson by various indie artists This Is the Town: A Tribute to Nilsson, Vol. 1.

Lana Del Rey references "Don't Forget Me" directly in the lyrics of her song "Did You Know That There's a Tunnel Under Ocean Blvd" released in December 2022. In an interview with Billie Eilish for Interview, Del Rey said that she was compelled to write a song inspired by Nilsson's track, but using her own metaphors.

== Track listing ==
Pussy Cats track listing
No.	Title	Writer(s)	Length
1.	"Many Rivers to Cross"	Jimmy Cliff	4:56
2.	"Subterranean Homesick Blues"	Bob Dylan	3:17
3.	"Don't Forget Me"	Nilsson	3:37
4.	"All My Life"	Nilsson	3:11
5.	"Old Forgotten Soldier"	Nilsson	4:14
6.	"Save the Last Dance for Me"	Doc Pomus, Mort Shuman	4:25
7.	"Mucho Mungo/Mt. Elga"	John Lennon, Nilsson	3:43
8.	"Loop de Loop" (featuring the Masked Alberts Kids Chorale)	Ted Vann	2:40
9.	"Black Sails"	Nilsson	3:15
10.	"Rock Around the Clock"	Jimmy DeKnight, Max C. Freedman	3:12

Bonus tracks (CD reissue)
No.	Title	Writer(s)	Length
11.	"Down by the Sea"	Nilsson	5:37
12.	"The Flying Saucer Song"	Nilsson	6:30
13.	"Turn Out the Light"	Nilsson	2:32
14.	"Save the Last Dance for Me" (alternate version)	Pomus, Shuman	4:26

== Personnel ==
- Harry Nilsson – vocals, piano (3, 5), electric piano (8, 10), clavinet (2), arrangements (3–10)
- Jesse Ed Davis – guitar (1, 2, 4, 5, 6, 7, 8, 10)
- Danny Kortchmar – guitar (1, 2, 4, 6, 7, 8, 10)
- Sneaky Pete Kleinow – pedal steel guitar (1, 2, 4, 6)
- Ken Ascher – piano (1, 4, 7), electric piano (2), orchestration, conducting
- Jane Getz – piano (6, 8, 10)
- Willie Smith – organ (1)
- Klaus Voormann – bass guitar (1, 2, 4, 5, 6, 7, 8, 10)
- Jim Keltner – drums (1, 2, 4, 6, 7, 8, 10)
- Ringo Starr – drums (1, 2, 4, 6, 8, 10), maracas (7)
- Keith Moon – drums (8, 10), congas (7), Chinese wood blocks (4)
- Doug Hoefer – snare drum (2)
- Cynthia Webb – maracas (7)
- Bobby Keys – saxophone (1, 2, 4, 6, 7, 8, 10)
- Trevor Lawrence – saxophone (2, 6, 7, 8, 10)
- Jim Horn – saxophone (8, 10)
- Gene Cipriano – saxophone (6)
- Tony Terran – trumpet (8, 10)
- Chuck Findley – trumpet (8, 10)
- The Masked Alberts Orchestra – strings (1, 3, 4, 6, 7, 9)
- Nathalie Altman, Susie Bell, Troy Germano, Erik Mueller, Rachel Mueller, Phylida Paterson, Peri Prestopino, David Steinberg, Cantey Turner, Kristin Turner, Damon Vigiano – the Masked Albert Kids Chorale (8)

Production and technical personnel

- John Lennon – producer, arrangements (1, 2, 4, 6, 7, 8, 10)
- Roy Cicala – engineer, assistant producer
- Jimmy Iovine – assistant engineer
- Mal Evans – production assistant
- Ringo Starr – production assistant
- Dennis Ferrante – Editing mixing
- Tom Rabstenak, Greg Calbi – mastering
- Cally – artwork, design, photography
- Acy R. Lehman – art direction
- Andrea T. Sheridan – liner notes
- Derek Taylor – liner notes
- Eddie Eddings – research
- Mike Hartry – digital transfers
- Bill Lacey – audio restoration
- Keith Munro – producer, coordination
- Curtis Armstrong – liner notes (reissue)

== Charts ==
Chart performance for Pussy Cats
Chart (1974)	Peak position
Australian Albums (Kent Music Report)	45
US Billboard 200	60

== See also ==
- Rock 'n' Roll
