= No One's First, and You're Next =

EP by Modest Mouse
- Released: August 4, 2009
- Recorded: 2003–2006
- Genres: Indie rock; alternative rock; folk rock; indie folk; post-punk revival; alternative country
- Length: 33:33
- Label: Epic

Modest Mouse chronology
| We Were Dead Before the Ship Even Sank (2007) | No One's First, and You're Next (2009) | Strangers to Ourselves (2015) |

Singles from No One's First, and You're Next
- 1. "King Rat" Released: March 20, 2007; 2. "Satellite Skin" Released: May 26, 2009; 3. "Autumn Beds" Released: June 23, 2009; 4. "Perpetual Motion Machine" Released: July 21, 2009

Professional ratings
Aggregate scores
| Source | Rating |
|---|---|
| Metacritic | (75/100) |
Review scores
| Source | Rating |
| AllMusic | 3.5/5 stars |
| The A.V. Club | B+ |
| Chicago Tribune | 2/4 stars |
| Entertainment Weekly | B |
| NME | (6/10) |
| No Ripcord | 6/10 stars |
| Now | 3/5 stars |
| Pitchfork Media | (7.2/10) |
| Planet Sound | (8/10) |
| PopMatters | 8/10 stars |

No One's First, and You're Next is an EP by American indie rock band Modest Mouse, released on August 4, 2009. It features unreleased tracks and B-sides from the band's previous two studio albums, Good News for People Who Love Bad News (2004) and We Were Dead Before the Ship Even Sank (2007). The compilation was first mentioned in February 2008 when Rolling Stone conducted a short interview with frontman Isaac Brock in their "Smoking Section" column; however, no other news regarding its release surfaced until an entire year later.

The vinyl version was released on August 14, 2009.

== Promotion ==
=== Singles ===
Three sets of 7" vinyl singles preceded the EP's release. The first single, "Satellite Skin / Guilty Cocker Spaniels", was planned to be released on April 18 in celebration of Record Store Day, but was pushed back to May 26 because Isaac Brock didn't like the color of the vinyl, as it wasn't the right shade of orange. The record seemed to have difficulty playing on many people's record players and the seller would not take them back, causing annoyance among Modest Mouse fans.

=== Music videos ===
Kevin Willis, who previously contributed artwork to drummer Jeremiah Green's side project Vells, directed the video for "Satellite Skin". Before his death in January 2008, Heath Ledger had started working on a music video for "King Rat". Unfinished when he died, the video was completed by co-director Daniel Auber and others. It was released on August 4, 2009, the same day that the EP was released. Later that year, Bent Image Lab director Nando Costa created a video for "The Whale Song", utilizing stop-motion animation.

== Track listing ==
All lyrics are written by Isaac Brock; all music credited to Modest Mouse; specific songwriters adapted from ASCAP.

| No. | Title | Music | Original source | Length |
|---|---|---|---|---|
| 1. | "Satellite Skin" | Brock, Eric Judy, Johnny Marr, Tom Peloso, Joe Plummer, Jeremiah Green | A-side single (2009) | 3:58 |
| 2. | "Guilty Cocker Spaniels" | Brock, Judy, Dann Gallucci | B-side to "Satellite Skin" | 3:59 |
| 3. | "Autumn Beds" | Brock, Judy, Marr, Plummer, Peloso, Green | A-side single (2009) | 3:42 |
| 4. | "The Whale Song" | Brock, Judy, Marr, Peloso, Plummer, Green | B-side to "Autumn Beds" | 6:07 |
| 5. | "Perpetual Motion Machine" | Brock, Marr, Plummer | A-side single (2009) | 3:11 |
| 6. | "History Sticks to Your Feet" | Brock, Judy, Marr | B-side to "Perpetual Motion Machine" | 3:55 |
| 7. | "King Rat" | Brock, Judy, Marr, Peloso, Plummer, Green | promotional single and B-side to "Dashboard" (2007) | 5:30 |
| 8. | "I've Got It All (Most)" | Brock, Judy, Green | B-side to "Float On"; vinyl-only track on Good News For People Who Love Bad News (2004) | 3:10 |
| Total length: | | | | 33:33 |

== Personnel ==
All credits for No One's First, and You're Next! adapted from the album's liner notes.

Modest Mouse

- Isaac Brock – vocals (all); guitar (1, 2, 4, 6); kalimba (1); banjo (3); production (1–3, 5, 6); mixing (3, 6)
- Eric Judy – bass (1, 2, 4); acoustic guitar (2); guitar (3, 8); guitar loop (6); piano (8)
- Tom Peloso – piano, lap steel (1); keyboards (3, 4)
- Johnny Marr – guitar (1, 4, 5, 6); slide (1); bass (3)
- Joe Plummer – drums (1, 3, 4); percussion, backing vocals (5)
- Jeremiah Green – percussion (1); keyboards (3); drums (4)
- Benjamin Weikel – drums (2, 6, 8)
- Dann Gallucci – keyboards (2); bass (8)

Additional personnel

- Dennis Herring – production (1–3, 5–8); Wurlitzer (5); mixing (7, 8)
- Clay Jones – production (1–3, 5, 6); mixing (3–6; engineering (7); recording (8)
- Joe Blaney – production, engineering (4)
- Dirty Dozen Brass Band – horns (5)
- James Mercer – backing vocals (5)
- Derrin Wiener – backing vocals (5)
- Joe Zook – engineering, mixing (7)
- Jacquire King – mixing, recording (8)
- Chris Mullins – illustration
- Joshua Marc Levy – art direction and design

== Charts ==
Chart performance for No One's First, and You're Next
| Chart (2009) | Peak position |
|---|---|
| Australian Albums (ARIA) | 91 |
| Canadian Albums (Billboard) | 14 |
| US Billboard 200 | 15 |
| US Top Rock Albums (Billboard) | 3 |
