= The Rat (song) =

Single by The Walkmen

from the album Bows + Arrows
- B-side: "Clementine"
- Released: April 19, 2004
- Recorded: April – October 2003
- Genre: Post-punk revival; indie rock; art punk
- Length: 4:22
- Label: Record Collection
- Songwriter: The Walkmen
- Producer: Dave Sardy

The Walkmen singles chronology
"The Rat" (2004)	"Little House of Savages" (2004)

Music video
- "The Rat" by the Walkmen on YouTube

"The Rat" is a song by American indie rock band the Walkmen. It was released as the first single from their second studio album, Bows + Arrows (2004), on April 19, 2004. The song peaked at number 45 on the UK Singles Chart.

== Composition and recording ==
Singer Hamilton Leithauser said the song originated in a jam session when the band were "just screwin' around." The band's drummer Matt Barrick instigated the track by playing a fast drum pattern. The band then quickly built this foundation into the full track. Leithauser said "we threw some chords on it, I wrote the words in five minutes." The song had been included in the band's live sets as early as February 2002, with slightly different lyrics than the recorded version.

The band's usual method was to self-produce their material. However, after unsuccessful attempts to record the layered electric organ and guitar, they decided to record the track with a professional record producer at the advice of their label. This was later viewed as an unsatisfactory move by bassist Walter Martin who said "It doesn't sound right at all. I think the production for the rest of the album makes the music sound big and live. But it just sounds dense and solid."

Ezra Koenig, who worked as an intern for the band, says the song was originally titled "Girls at Night" and was recorded a year after it was first played to him.

== Music video ==
The video features a live performance shot in black and white making use of chiaroscuro and directed by filmmaker Eva Aridjis.

== Critical reception ==
The track has received highly positive critical acclaim, featuring in many end-of-decade lists. It was named thirteenth best track of the decade by NME and 20th best track of the 2000s by Pitchfork Media who named it "a St. Valentine's Day Massacre of relentless drums, bass, and guitar." Rolling Stone called it "one of the greatest songs of the century". Modern Drummer magazine praised Barrick's performance as "a jaw-dropping exercise in precision and velocity". In October 2011, NME placed it at number 31 on its list "150 Best Tracks of the Past 15 Years".

Stylus Magazine took a different slant saying that the song's 'one-hit wonder' success "was the worst thing to ever happen to The Walkmen. It brought the iPod-lazy—singles, MP3s, mix and matchers—to their shows and records."

The song is featured on the soundtracks of Major League Baseball 2K7, Dirt 2, and True Crime: New York City.

Joe Talbot (singer) of the band Idles has a tattoo of a rat with the words "You've got a nerve" and he said that is his favorite song.

== Cover versions ==
- Florence and The Machine covered the track as part of a series on Myspace Music.
- Lonely the Brave covered the track, which was released as part of their Diamond Days EP in 2017.
- In 2020 Melted Bodies covered the track as a stand-alone single, before releasing it as bonus track of their debut album Enjoy Yourself.

== Track listing ==
=== CD & 7" ===
1. "The Rat"
2. "Clementine"

== Charts ==
Chart (2004)	Peak position
Scottish Singles Sales (Official Charts)	49
UK Singles (Official Charts)	45
