= Johnny Thunder (singer) =

American singer (1931–2024)

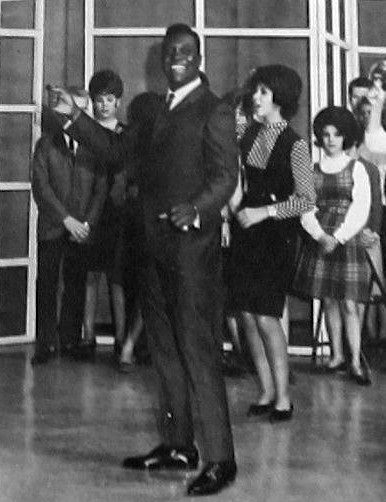
- Thunder in 1962

Background information
- Born: Gilbert Leroy Hamilton; August 15, 1931; Leesburg, Florida, U.S.
- Died: September 6, 2024 (aged 93) Winter Park, Florida, U.S.
- Genres: Rhythm and blues, pop
- Occupation: Singer
- Years active: 1950s–2024
- Labels: Diamond, Capitol, Vee Jay, Calla, Stateside
- Website: johnnythunder.com

Leroy "Gilbert" Hamilton (August 15, 1931 – September 6, 2024), known as Johnny Thunder, was an American R&B and pop singer whose biggest hit was "Loop de Loop" in 1963.

== Life and career ==
Leroy Hamilton was born in Okahumpka, Florida, on August 15, 1931, and started singing in church and on street corners when in his teens. In 1951 he left his small town to attend Florida A&M (FAMU) in Tallahassee. At that time he took on the name Gilbert, thinking it sounded more professional, he started going by the name Gil. Aiming to start a singing career in the late 1950s, he moved to New York City, where he joined a touring version of The Drifters for a few months, and also sang in an Apollo Theater production, A Blind Man Sings the Blues. He also recorded as a backing singer for Dionne Warwick and others, and, as Gil Hamilton, recorded several singles for various small labels. One of his singles recorded in 1962, "Tell Her", written by Bert Berns under the pseudonym Bert Russell, and produced by Berns, was the original version of "Tell Him" which later became an international hit for The Exciters (and in the UK for Billie Davis). Hamilton's 1962 Vee Jay single "Move & Groove" was the original version of Johnny O'Keefe's 1963 Australian hit "Move Baby Move".

In 1963, Thunder linked up with songwriter and record producer Teddy Vann, who persuaded him to record a novelty version of the traditional children's nursery song "Loop de Loop" (also known as "Looby Lou"), using the name "Johnny Thunder". Vann also advised him to appeal more to the teenage market by claiming he was born in 1941 rather than his actual birth year of 1931. The record, released on the Diamond label, became a big hit, rising to No. 4 on the Billboard Hot 100 in early 1963; it was covered by Frankie Vaughan in the UK. Johnny Thunder released an album, Loop De Loop, and several follow-up singles, of which "Everybody Do The Sloopy" was the most successful, reaching no. 67 in late 1965. In 1967, he had another minor hit as part of a duo with Ruby Winters on "Make Love To Me".

In 1969, Thunder released his first single for Calla Records, the "raucous" rock song "I'm Alive", featuring "Verbal Expressions of T.V." as its B-side. The song was originally written by Tommy James, who had recorded and released his own version the previous year with his band the Shondells on their album Crimson & Clover.

Bob Dylan, who had heard Thunder's "I'm Alive" on the radio, was asked by Rolling Stone's Jann Wenner that year if he was impressed by anything in the rock music scene and pointed to the song: "Never heard it either, huh? Well, I can't believe it. Everyone I've talked to, I've asked them if they've heard that record. It was one of the most powerful records I've ever heard. It's called 'I'm Alive.' By Johnny Thunder. Well, it was that sentiment, truly expressed. That's the most I can say ... if you heard the record, you'd know what I mean."

Thunder's version of "I'm Alive" was later used by Samsung in their advertisement of the Galaxy S6 Edge in 2015. It was also used in the soundtrack for the 2018 film American Animals and in a 2025 Lincoln vehicle commercial.

Thunder died in Winter Park, Florida, on September 6, 2024, at the age of 93.

== See also ==
- List of 1960s one-hit wonders in the United States
