= King Rat (song) =

Single by Modest Mouse

from the album No One's First, and You're Next
- Released: March 20, 2007
- Length: 5:27
- Label: Epic Records
- Songwriters: Isaac Brock, Jeremiah Green, Eric Judy, Joe Plummer, Johnny Marr, Tom Peloso
- Producer: Dennis Herring

Modest Mouse singles chronology
| "Dashboard" (2007) | "King Rat" (2007) | "Missed the Boat" (2007) |

"King Rat" is a song by indie rock band Modest Mouse and appears as the title track to their fifth promotional single, following "The World At Large". The single was later released on the band's 2009 EP No One's First, and You're Next. The promo also features the song "Fire It Up" from their 2007 album We Were Dead Before the Ship Even Sank.

The promo was given away through multiple online music stores when the individual purchased a pre-order of We Were Dead Before the Ship Even Sank. The promo features the track "King Rat", later included on the "Dashboard" single, on the A-side, and "Fire It Up" on the B-side, although some discs are mislabeled, with Side A having "Fire It Up" and Side B having "King Rat" instead.

Isaac Brock had stated in an interview published on 10 April 2007 that the band intended to release the song on an EP at a later date, along with other tracks that did not make the album We Were Dead Before the Ship Even Sank.

== Music video ==
During a boat trip with family and friends while on a visit to his native Australia in January 2007, actor Heath Ledger outlined a music video idea for the then unreleased song to frontman Isaac Brock and other band members. Modest Mouse, who had befriended Ledger through their tour manager, had been touring Australia at the time.

The animated video, which was "fully conceived down to the last detail but unfinished" when Ledger died in January 2008, was completed by members of Los Angeles art collective/production company The Masses, made up of Daniel Auber (co-director and illustrator), Norris Houk (lead animator), Jade Taglioli (animator) and Sara Cline (producer). Ledger, who had also been part of The Masses, received a director's credit. Earlier media reports claiming that Terry Gilliam would handle the animation work did not prove to be true.

The video debuted on 4 August 2009—the same day the EP No One's First and You're Next was released—on MySpace and The Masses' website.

Ledger, who was opposing "the illegal commercial whale hunts taking place off the coast of Australia each year," intended the video—which depicts whales poaching humans to make pet food - "to raise awareness on modern whaling practices." Furthermore, proceeds from iTunes purchases of the song, in its first month on iTunes, were donated to the Sea Shepherd Conservation Society, who actively intervene with whale hunting.

== Track listing ==
Side A: "King Rat" – 5:27
Side B: "Fire It Up" – 4:35
