= We've Got Everything =

Single by Modest Mouse

from the album We Were Dead Before the Ship Even Sank
- Released: October 2, 2007
- Genre: Indie rock
- Length: 3:42
- Label: Epic
- Songwriters: Isaac Brock, Jeremiah Green, Eric Judy, Johnny Marr, Tom Peloso, Joe Plummer
- Producer: Dennis Herring

Modest Mouse singles chronology
"Missed the Boat" (2007)	"We've Got Everything" (2007)	"Little Motel" (2007)

Music video
- "We've Got Everything" on YouTube

"We've Got Everything" is a single by American indie band Modest Mouse and is the seventh track on their 2007 album We Were Dead Before the Ship Even Sank. James Mercer of The Shins sings backup vocals. On June 13, 2007, an animated video, directed by mtvU's Best Film on Campus Modest Mouse Video Contest winner Joe Stakun, for We've Got Everything was featured on MTV's Battle of the Videos.
