= The Cult of Sincerity =

- Directed by: Adam Browne; Brendan Choisnet
- Written by: Daniel Nayeri
- Produced by: Brendan Choisnet; Daniel Nayeri
- Starring: Mercer Boffey
- Cinematography: Adam Browne
- Edited by: Adam Browne
- Distributed by: YouTube; Amazon Video on Demand
- Release date: April 8, 2008
- Running time: 92 minutes
- Country: United States
- Language: English

The Cult of Sincerity is an independent film about hipster culture and postmodernist irony set in Williamsburg in Brooklyn. It was released in its entirety on YouTube on April 8, 2008, making it the first time that YouTube had partnered with filmmakers for a film premiere. The film was later released as a digital download, with some of the proceeds going to the charity Fount of Mercy.

== Production ==
The filmmakers collaborated with Amie Street, a digital music site for indie musicians, to help pay for the production.

== Plot ==
When his mother informs Joseph that she's divorcing his father Joseph enters into a protracted existential crisis. Unhappy with the way society is moving, Joseph decides to attempt to turn back the flow of cynicism with a series of well-intentioned gestures and a slogan that he can put on a t-shirt. As Joseph struggles to find that slogan, he quickly realizes that it is not very easy changing the world.

== See also ==
- Digital distribution
- New Sincerity
- Postmodernist film
