= Missed the Boat =

Single by Modest Mouse

from the album We Were Dead Before the Ship Even Sank
- Released: May 1, 2007
- Genre: Indie rock
- Length: 4:24
- Label: Epic Records
- Songwriters: Isaac Brock, Jeremiah Green, Eric Judy, Joe Plummer, Johnny Marr, Tom Peloso
- Producer: Dennis Herring

Modest Mouse singles chronology
"King Rat" (2007)	"Missed the Boat" (2007)	"We've Got Everything" (2007)

Music video
- "Missed the Boat" on YouTube

"Missed the Boat" is a song by American indie rock band Modest Mouse and is the sixth track on their 2007 album, We Were Dead Before the Ship Even Sank. The song was released as the second single from that album and peaked at #24 in Billboard's Hot Modern Rock Tracks chart.

James Mercer of The Shins sings backup vocals on "Missed the Boat".

== Music video ==
In 2007, Apple Inc. and Modest Mouse asked fans to direct and film a video for the song. The contest ended on May 22, 2007. Christopher Mills, who also directed the "Float On" video, directed the green screen sequences used in the contest. The winning video, directed by Walter Robot, that is Christopher Louie and Bill Barminski, shows a robot who directed himself in a video about a robot who runs away from home.

Another video, shown on MTV2 and Fuse TV, features segued segments of other submitted videos, with the winning video only appearing for five seconds.

== Chart performance ==
Chart (2007)	Peak positions
U.S. Billboard Hot Modern Rock Tracks	24

== Popular culture ==
This song appears in the Scrubs episode "My Waste of Time" at the end of the show.
