= A Hundred Miles Off =

Studio album by The Walkmen
- Released: May 23, 2006
- Recorded: October 2005 – January 2006
- Studio: Inner Ear, Arlington; Marcata Recording, New York
- Genre: Post-punk
- Length: 41:54
- Label: Record Collection
- Producer: The Walkmen

The Walkmen chronology
Bows + Arrows (2004)	A Hundred Miles Off (2006)	Pussy Cats (2006)

Singles from A Hundred Miles Off
- 1. "Louisiana" Released: September 11, 2006

Professional ratings
Aggregate scores
Source	Rating
Metacritic	70/100 link
Review scores
Source	Rating
Allmusic	link
Crawdaddy!	very favorable 2007
Pitchfork Media	6.5/10 link
Rolling Stone	link

A Hundred Miles Off is the third studio album by the American rock band the Walkmen, released on May 23, 2006, by Record Collection.

== Track listing and Personnel ==
1. "Louisiana" – 3:52
  - Hamilton Leithauser - vocals, guitar
  - Paul Maroon - piano
  - Peter Bauer - lead guitar
  - Walter Martin - bass
  - Matt Barrick - drums
  - Tom Peloso - trumpet
2. "Danny's at the Wedding" – 3:55
  - Hamilton Leithauser - vocals, guitar
  - Paul Maroon - guitar
  - Walter Martin - bass, piano, percussion
  - Matt Barrick - drums
3. "Good for You's Good for Me" – 2:22
  - Hamilton Leithauser - vocals, guitar
  - Paul Maroon - guitar
  - Peter Bauer - organ
  - Walter Martin - bass
  - Matt Barrick - drums
4. "Emma, Get Me a Lemon" – 3:12
  - Hamilton Leithauser - vocals, guitar
  - Paul Maroon - guitar
  - Peter Bauer - organ
  - Walter Martin - bass, lap steel guitar, djembe
  - Matt Barrick - drums
5. "All Hands and the Cook" – 4:09
  - Hamilton Leithauser - guitar, vocals, piano
  - Peter Bauer - organ
  - Walter Martin - bass, drums, percussion
6. "Lost in Boston" – 3:42
  - Hamilton Leithauser - vocals, guitar
  - Paul Maroon - guitar
  - Peter Bauer - organ, percussion
  - Walter Martin - bass, percussion
  - Matt Barrick - drums, percussion
7. "Don't Get Me Down (Come on Over Here)" – 4:04
  - Hamilton Leithauser - vocals, guitar
  - Paul Maroon - guitar
  - Peter Bauer - organ
  - Walter Martin - bass, percussion
  - Matt Barrick - drums
8. "Tenley Town" – 3:03
  - Hamilton Leithauser - vocals
  - Paul Maroon - guitar
  - Walter Martin - bass
  - Matt Barrick - drums
9. "This Job Is Killing Me" – 3:28
  - Hamilton Leithauser - vocals, guitar
  - Paul Maroon - guitar
  - Peter Bauer - organ, piano
  - Walter Martin - bass, percussion
  - Matt Barrick - drums
10. "Brandy Alexander" – 2:32
  - Hamilton Leithauser - vocals, guitar
  - Walter Martin - bass, djembe, percussion
  - Matt Barrick - drums
11. "Always After You ('Til You Started After Me)" – 3:39
  - Hamilton Leithauser - vocals
  - Paul Maroon - guitar
  - Peter Bauer - organ
  - Walter Martin - bass
  - Matt Barrick - drums
12. "Another One Goes By" – 3:56
  - Hamilton Leithauser - vocals, guitar
  - Paul Maroon - lead guitar, piano
  - Peter Bauer - organ
  - Walter Martin - bass, percussion
  - Matt Barrick - drums
- The track "Another One Goes By" is a cover of a song by the band Mazarin.

The track "Brandy Alexander" is featured in the 2008 film In Bruges.

== Singles ==
- "Louisiana" (September 11, 2006)
  - US 7" vinyl: "Louisiana" / "Another One Goes By"
  - UK CD: "Louisiana" / "Another One Goes By" / "Lost in Boston"
  - UK 7" vinyl picture disc: "Louisiana" / "Lost in Boston"
