= The Walkmen =

American indie rock band

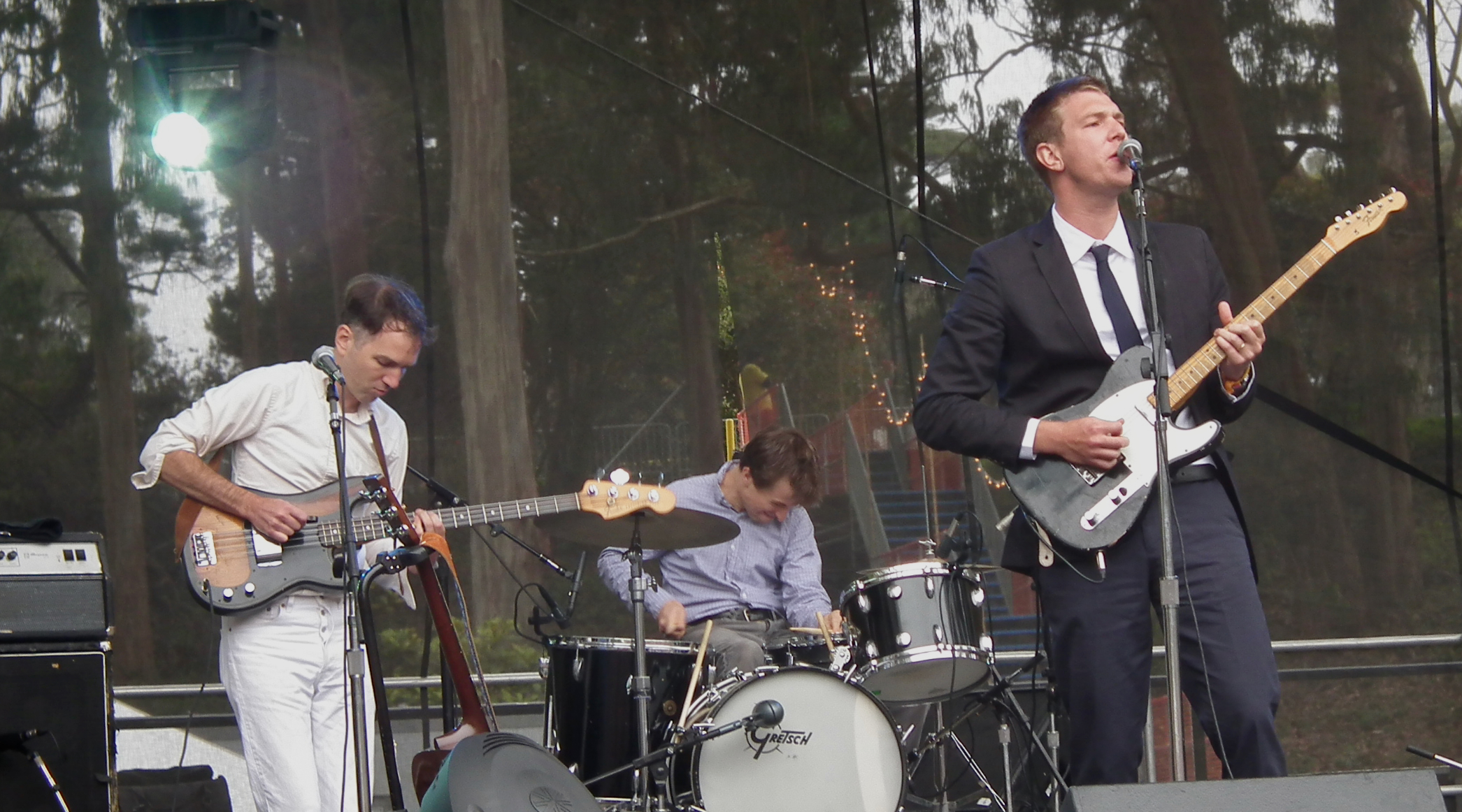
- The Walkmen performing in 2012

Background information
- Origin: New York City, U.S.
- Genres: Indie rock; post-punk revival; garage rock; art rock
- Years active: 2000–2013; 2023–present
- Labels: Startime International; Record Collection; Gigantic Music; Fat Possum; Bella Union
- Spinoff of: Jonathan Fire*Eater; The Recoys
- Members: Hamilton Leithauser; Paul Maroon; Walter Martin; Peter Bauer; Matt Barrick
- Website: thewalkmen.com

The Walkmen is an American rock band formed in New York City in 2000. The band consists of Hamilton Leithauser (vocals), Paul Maroon (guitar, keyboards), Walter Martin (bass, organ), Peter Matthew Bauer (organ, bass) and Matt Barrick (drums). Leithauser and Bauer are former members of The Recoys, while Maroon, Martin, and Barrick are former members of Jonathan Fire*Eater.

Initially active from 2000 to 2013, they are known as part of the 2000s-era post-punk revival in New York City, particularly for their critically acclaimed single "The Rat". The band released seven studio albums during their initial run: Everyone Who Pretended to Like Me Is Gone (2002), Bows + Arrows (2004), A Hundred Miles Off (2006), "Pussy Cats" Starring the Walkmen (2006), You & Me (2008), Lisbon (2010) and Heaven (2012).

The band went on hiatus in 2013, with Leithauser, Bauer and Martin all pursuing solo careers, and Barrick joining Fleet Foxes in a session capacity. In 2023, the band reunited for an extensive tour named "The Revenge Tour".

== History ==
=== 2000–2003: Early years and debut album ===
Each of the members of the Walkmen grew up in and around the Washington, DC, area, played in many of the same bands from early in their careers, and even attended the same Washington-area high school, St. Albans School; Bauer attended Maret School while the other band members attended St. Albans. The bandmates eventually moved to Harlem.

The band was formed in 2000 following the breakup of two separate bands: Jonathan Fire*Eater, whose members included Martin, Maroon and Barrick, and The Recoys, whose members included Leithauser and Bauer. The three members from Jonathan Fire*Eater, borrowed money from their family and friends to construct a rehearsal space in Harlem. The rehearsal space featured a 24-track recording studio and was dubbed Marcata Studios.

The newly formed band, who wished to distance themselves from the garage rock sounds of previous bands, released a self-titled EP of songs in 2001 on Startime International, a small Brooklyn-based record label. Shortly after the release of the EP, which featured a blend of upright pianos and other vintage instruments, the Walkmen made their official live debut with a performance at Joe's Pub in the East Village.

The 2002 debut album Everyone Who Pretended to Like Me Is Gone, released by Startime, was well received by critics. The album was noted for its innovative approach to atmosphere and instrumentation, with sparse bass and drums complemented by plinking piano, jangly guitars and Leithauser's unique vocal stylings. Two of the songs on the album, "The Blizzard of '96" and "That's the Punchline", were adaptations of tracks meant for The Recoys' unreleased full-length album.

Critics compared the results of the album to past work by U2 and The Cure as a result of the uniqueness of its sound as compared to other contemporary New York City bands such as The Strokes. One of the album's songs, "We've Been Had", was featured in a commercial for a Saturn Ion automobile.

=== 2004–2005: Bows + Arrows and "The Rat" ===
The band's follow-up album, Bows + Arrows, was released on the Record Collection label in 2004 and was listed by many critics as one of the year's best albums. The album was recorded in 2003 at Marcata Recording in New York City, Sweet Tea Studios in Oxford, MS, Easley-McCain Studios in Memphis, Tennessee, and The Magic Shop in New York City. The album spawned singles for the songs "The Rat" and "Little House of Savages". Critical success of the album led the band to perform on the popular Fox series The O.C. Bows + Arrows was noted for containing a more immediate and focused sound than its predecessor; both "The Rat" and "Little House of Savages" were seen as stark contrasts to much of the band's past outputs.

=== 2006–2008: A Hundred Miles Off and Pussy Cats ===
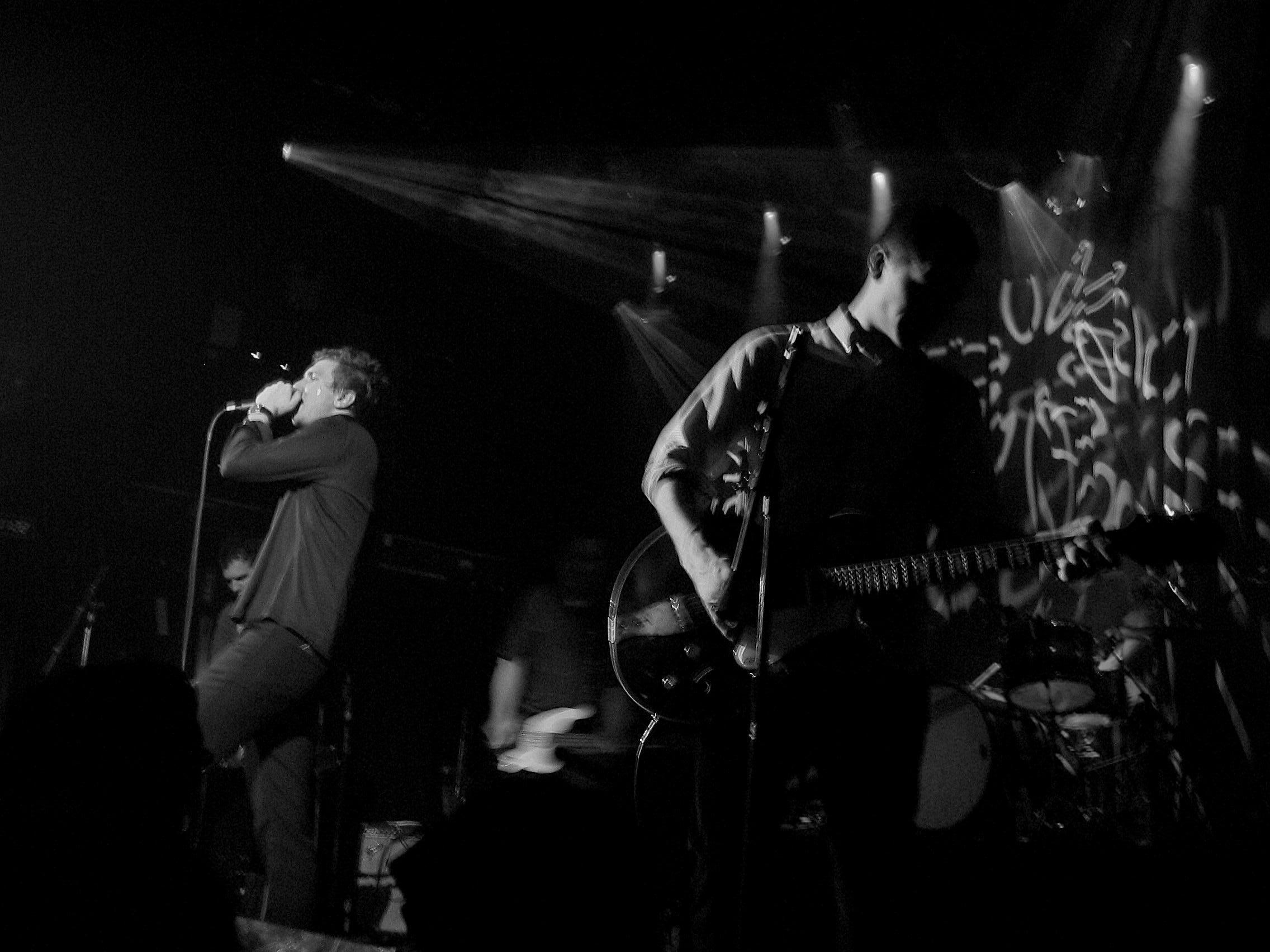
The Walkmen performing in NYC in 2004

Their next album, A Hundred Miles Off, was released in the U.S. on May 23, 2006. The band premiered most of the new songs on a tour of the Northeast in early 2006. The first single to be released was "Louisiana", which featured an upbeat chorus of horns. Peter Bauer and Walter Martin traded musical instruments on the new album, with Bauer handling the organ duties and Martin playing bass. The album found the band refocusing its sound toward folk sounds, unlike their previous two albums; though the change in direction was lauded by some critics, other reviews were often mixed.

The band was forced to close Marcata Studios that same year after Columbia University purchased the building it resided in. The band released another full-length album, "Pussy Cats" Starring the Walkmen, a track-by-track cover of Harry Nilsson and John Lennon's 1974 album Pussy Cats, as a farewell to their studio's Harlem location.

=== 2009–2011: You & Me and Lisbon ===
Their next studio album, You & Me, became available on July 29, 2008, as an exclusive charitable pre-release on indie music website Amie Street. The Walkmen made the album available for $5 on Amie Street, with all proceeds donated to the Memorial Sloan-Kettering Cancer Center. During its first week of sales, the album charted at No. 29 on Billboard's Top Digital Albums. The album was made available on physical formats on August 19, 2008. The album was recorded at Sweet Tea Studios in Oxford, MS, with John Agnello, and at Gigantic Studios in New York City with Chris Zane. The album artwork featured photographs by Fred J. Maroon, guitarist Paul Maroon's father.

The Walkmen recorded 13 songs for their album Lisbon in five days in August 2009 with John Congleton and Chris Zane. They had been playing several of the songs since the summer of 2009. They recorded "something like 28 songs", but included only 11 on the album. In support of the new album, the Walkmen performed at All Tomorrow Parties in May 2010, Lollapalooza in early August 2010, and the Reading and Leeds Festivals at the end of August 2010. Lisbon was released on September 14, 2010, on the label Fat Possum records. Initial reviews have been favorable, with Pitchfork Media awarding the album 8.6/10, and PopMatters rating it 7/10. The band embarked on a fall tour of North America and Europe to support their new release.

=== 2012–2013: Heaven ===
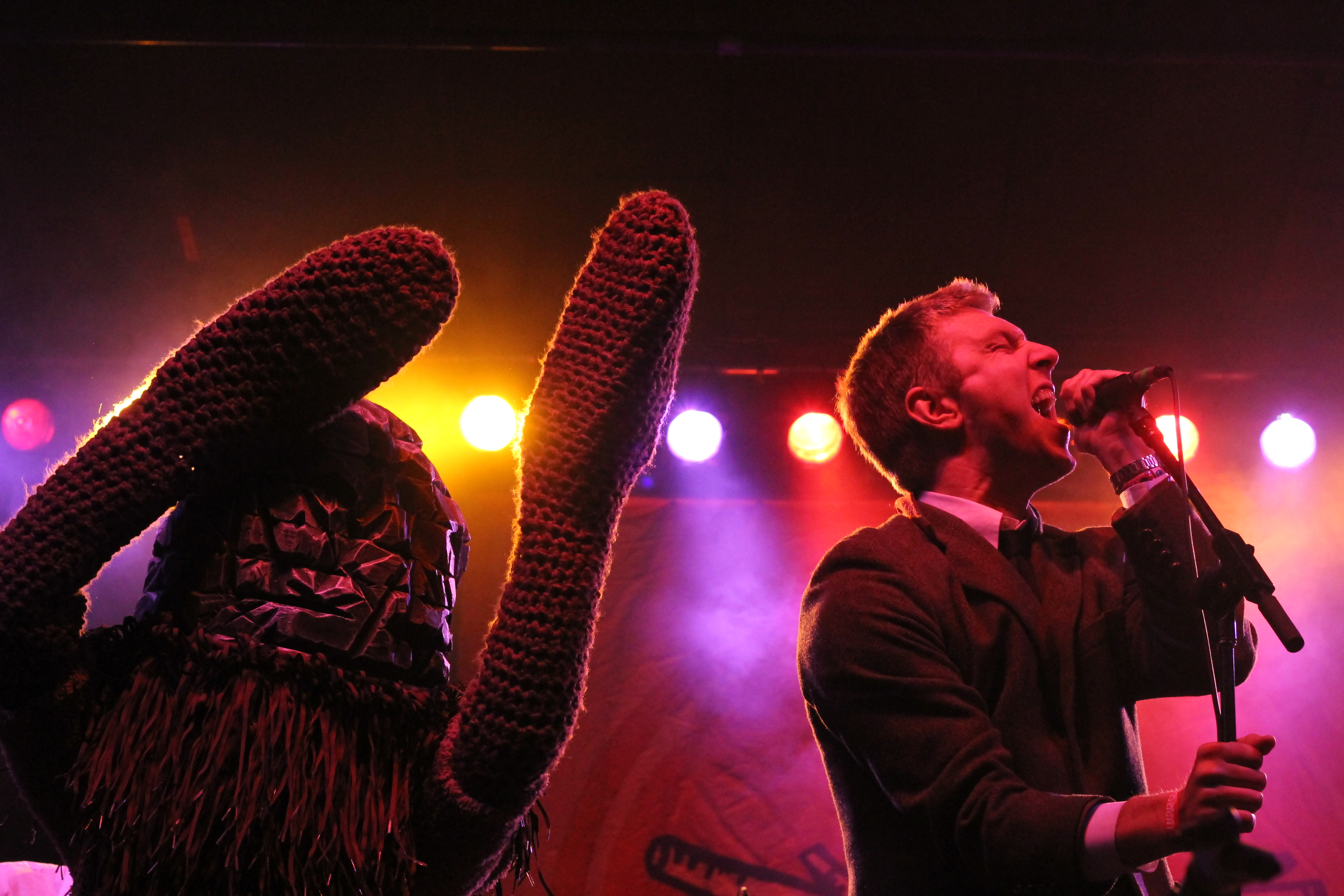
The Walkmen performing at Treefort Music Fest in 2013

In March 2012, Pitchfork announced that Heaven would be out that June. The album was completed in early March, with the band writing on their website: "Hi everyone. Our album is finally done and we're thrilled with it. We can't wait to get it out there." They released the song "Heaven" via Pitchfork on April 16, 2012, sparking the website to give the title "Best New Track" on the same day.

The Walkmen toured in early 2012 for the 10th anniversary of Everyone Who Pretended to Like Me Is Gone.

Heaven was released on May 29, 2012, to positive reviews. Pitchfork rated it 8.1, and Stereogum called it the second-best album of the year. American Songwriter said that Heaven is "arguably their best, and certainly most accomplished album yet." Still in Rock gave the album a 7.8 rating and made a selection of the best tracks on the album.

The music video for the album's tenth track, "The Love You Love", was shot at the infamous Baleroy Mansion in Philadelphia by the band who was looking for a haunted site. The song "Heaven" was also used as the closing song on the series finale of the hit CBS show How I Met Your Mother.

=== 2014–present: Hiatus and 2023 reunion tour ===
At the close of the band's tour for Heaven, in December 2013, the band entered an extended hiatus.

In October 2020, Hamilton Leithauser was asked about the possibility of a Walkmen reunion during a Reddit AMA, to which he replied: "No plans right now, but I guess stranger things are happening every fifteen minutes right now... so you never know."

In November 2022 they announced that, after a ten-year hiatus, they would reunite to play several shows in April 2023, in New York City. In April 2023 they played a reunion show on The Late Show With Stephen Colbert, followed by a show in Rhode Island and several more in Webster Hall, in New York City. In May 2023, they announced 29 additional shows on their 2023 reunion tour: in Chicago, Washington, D.C., and Boston in May; in several European festivals and cities in June and August; and in Nashville, Minneapolis, the U.S. West Coast, Austin, and Toronto in September and October.

== Band members ==
- Hamilton Leithauser – lead vocals
- Paul Maroon – guitars, keyboards
- Walter Martin – bass guitar, organ
- Peter Matthew Bauer – organ, bass guitar
- Matt Barrick – drums, percussion

== Discography ==
=== Studio albums ===
Title	Album details	Peak chart positions								
Title	Album details	US	US Alt.	US Indie	US Rock	BEL (FL)	POR	SCO	UK	UK Indie
Everyone Who Pretended to Like Me Is Gone	Released: March 26, 2002; Labels: Startime International	—	—	—	—	—	—	—	—	—
Bows + Arrows	Released: February 3, 2004; Labels: Record Collection	— (Note: Bows + Arrows did not enter the Billboard 200 Chart, but peaked at number eight on the Heatseekers Albums chart.)	—	9	—	—	—	65	62	—
A Hundred Miles Off	Released: May 23, 2006; Labels: Record Collection	163	—	8	—	—	—	—	—	—
"Pussy Cats" Starring the Walkmen	Released: October 24, 2006; Labels: Record Collection; Cover album	—	—	—	—	—	—	—	—	—
You & Me	Released: August 19, 2008; Labels: Gigantic Music (US), Fierce Panda (UK)	71	—	—	—	—	—	—	— (Note: You & Me did not enter the UK Albums Chart, but peaked at number 23 on the UK Record Store Chart.)	—
Lisbon	Released: September 14, 2010; Labels: Fat Possum (US), Bella Union (UK)	27	8	3	10	—	—	—	94	9
Heaven	Released: May 29, 2012; Labels: Fat Possum (US), Bella Union (UK)	30	9	8	15	176	28	70	82	11
"—" denotes album that did not chart or was not released.

=== EPs ===
- The Walkmen (June 26, 2001)
- Let's Live Together (March 25, 2002)
- Untitled (Black cover, with eight songs) (April 3, 2002)
- Untitled (White cover, with eight songs) (April 3, 2002)
- Split (with Calla) (September 17, 2002)
- Christmas Party (2004)
- Daytrotter Session, March 2008 (Leonard Cohen covers)
- Daytrotter Session, August 2008 (Neil Hagerty covers)
- Live Session (iTunes Exclusive) (August 12, 2009)

=== Singles ===
Title	Year	Peak chart positions				Album
Title	Year	US Sales	SCO	UK	UK Indie	Album
"The Rat"	2004	—	49	45	—	Bows + Arrows
"Little House of Savages"	2004	—	88	72	—	Bows + Arrows
"Louisiana"	2006	—	79	160	—	A Hundred Miles Off
"The Blue Route" / "Canadian Girl"	2008	—	—	— (Note: "The Blue Route" / "Canadian Girl" did not enter the UK Singles Chart, but peaked at number 99 on the UK Physical Singles Chart Top 100.)	23	You & Me
"In the New Year"	2009	—	—	— (Note: "In the New Year" did not enter the UK Singles Chart, but peaked at number 63 on the UK Physical Singles Chart Top 100.)	—	You & Me
"Weight on My Shoulders" / "Good Days Carry On" (Note: "Weight on My Shoulders" / "Good Days Carry On" were released as a limited edition 7" single.)	2010	—	—	—	—	Non-album single
"Stranded"	2010	—	—	—	—	Lisbon
"Angela Surf City"	2010	—	—	— (Note: "Angela Surf City" did not enter the UK Singles Chart, but peaked at number 51 on the UK Physical Singles Chart Top 100.)	—	Lisbon
"Heaven"	2012	—	—	—	—	Heaven
"The Love You Love"	2012	—	—	—	—	Heaven
"Dance with Your Partner" / "Vermeer '65" (Note: "Dance with Your Partner" / "Vermeer '65" were released as a limited edition 7" single.)	2012	25	—	— (Note: "Dance With Your Partner" / "Vermeer '65" did not enter the UK Singles Chart, but peaked at number 95 on the UK Physical Singles Chart Top 100.)	—	Non-album single
"—" denotes single that did not chart or was not released

=== Other appearances ===
Song	Year	Appearance
"Radio" (aka "Wake Up")"	2001	This Is Next Year: A Brooklyn-Based Compilation
"There Goes My Baby"	2005	Stubbs the Zombie: The Soundtrack
"Little House of Savages (Live version)"	2006	Music from the OC: Mix 2
"Red River"	2007	Spider-Man 3 Soundtrack
"Lemon Hill"	2007	Blog Released Track
"Ripple"	2016	Day of the Dead
”We’ve Been Had”	2025	Black Rabbit (Episode 1)

=== Music videos ===
Title	Year	Director(s)
"We've Been Had"	2002	
"The Rat"	2004	Eva Aridjis
"Little House of Savages"	2004	
"Louisiana"	2006	
"Red River"	2007	Mike Piscitelli
"In the New Year"	2008	
"On the Water"	2008	Jake Davis
"Four Provinces"	2009	
"While I Shovel the Snow"	2010	Jake Davis
"Heaven"	2012	Alex Southam
"The Love You Love"	2012	
