= Walter Martin (musician) =

American musician and songwriter

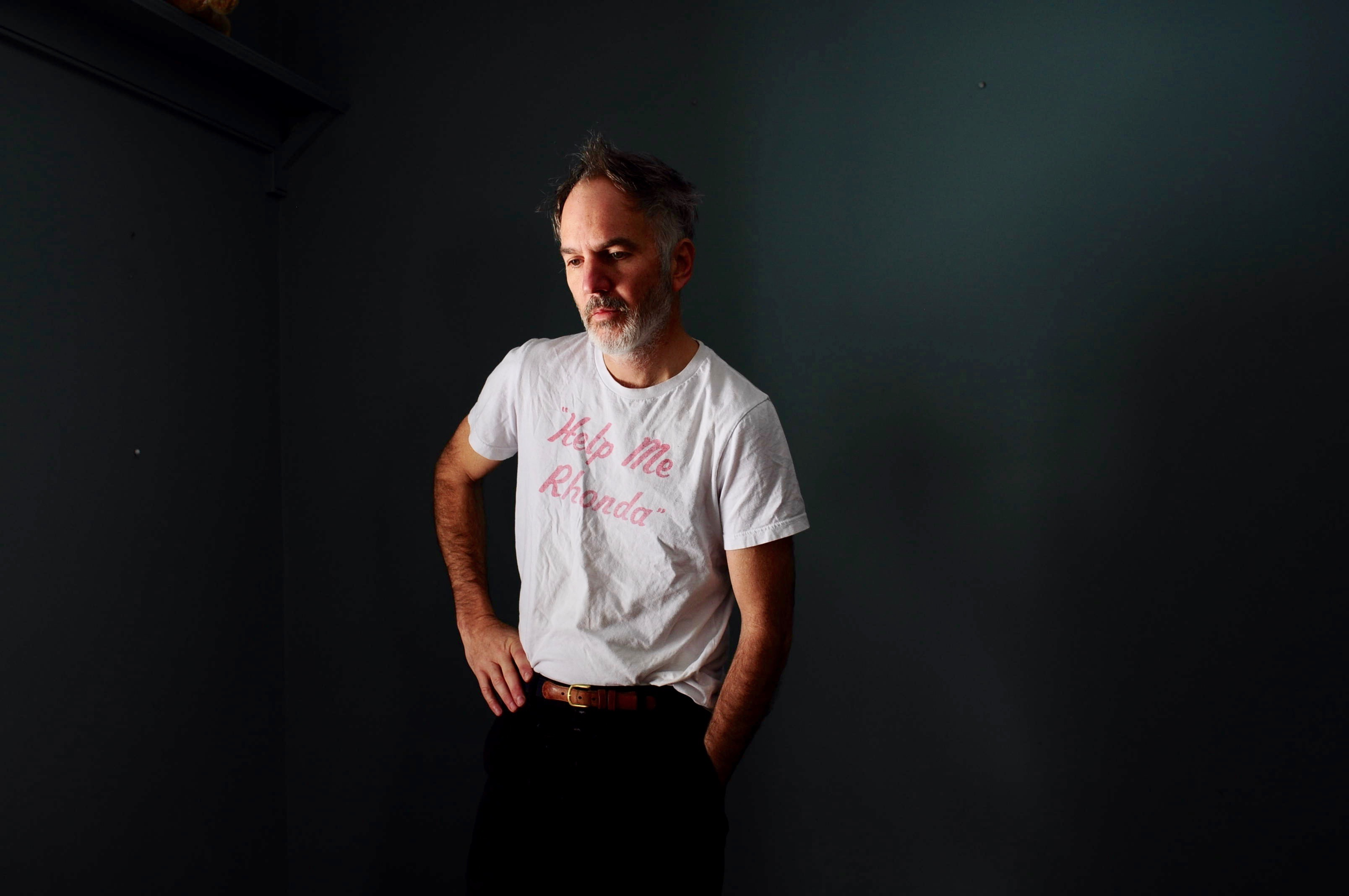
- Martin in 2021

Background information
- Born: Walter R. Martin Washington, D.C., U.S.
- Genre: Indie rock
- Instruments: Vocals, guitar, bass guitar, organ
- Years active: 1994–present
- Label: Ile Flottante Music
- Website: www.waltermartinmusic.com

Walter Martin is an American musician and songwriter best known as a founding member of the New York City indie rock bands The Walkmen (co-writer, lyricist, multi-instrumentalist 2000–2013; 2023–present) and Jonathan Fire*Eater (co-writer, organist 1994–1998). Following the Walkmen's break-up in 2013, Martin launched a critically acclaimed solo career and has subsequently released seven studio albums.

In addition to his solo work, Martin composes original music for film, television, and commercials.

== Early life ==
Martin was born and raised in Washington, D.C., United States. He formed his first band at age 11 with future Jonathan Fire*Eater singer Stewart Lupton. He played organ, guitar, and drums in various bands throughout high school with Lupton, Matt Barrick, and Paul Maroon as well as with future members of NYC band French Kicks. His band, The Ignobles, opened for many national touring performers at DC's 9:30 Club including: Lenny Kravitz, Fugazi, the Selecter, and the Mighty Mighty Bosstones.

Martin attended and graduated from college where he studied art history.

== Career ==
=== Jonathan Fire*Eater (1993–1997) ===
Martin formed Jonathan Fire*Eater with high school friends Paul Maroon, Stewart Lupton, Matt Barrick, and Tom Frank from Washington, DC. As co-writer and multi-instrumentalist, Martin played a Farfisa organ and a Gretsch lap steel guitar. The band played at clubs in lower Manhattan until being courted by major labels and eventually signed by DreamWorks Records. They released a series of EPs and singles and a full-length for DreamWorks before breaking up in 1998.

=== Marcata Studios (1998–2001) ===
In 1998, Martin, Paul Maroon, and Matt Barrick built Marcata Recording, an analog recording studio in Harlem in upper Manhattan. Ezra Koenig of Vampire Weekend was their sole employee, an unpaid intern. The Walkmen recorded at Marcata on and off until the studio closed in 2006.

=== The Walkmen (2001–2013) ===
Martin, Paul Maroon, and Matt Barrick formed the Walkmen with Martin's younger cousin Hamilton Leithauser and his friend Peter Bauer. Martin was lyricist, co-writer, and multi-instrumentalist for the Walkmen. On stage Martin played organ, piano, and bass guitar but his main contributions to the Walkmen were as composer, arranger, and lyricist.

=== Solo career (2014–present) ===
Martin began writing his solo debut album We're All Young Together during the final days of the Walkmen. It released on May 13, 2014, and was self-described as a family-friendly album geared towards kids. It was met with critical acclaim from Pitchfork, NPR's All Things Considered, USA Today, and The New York Times who called it, "An album of joyful children’s music that is also sophisticated enough for grown-ups to appreciate." It featured guest vocals from Karen O (Yeah Yeah Yeahs), Matt Berninger (The National), and Alec Ounsworth (Clap Your Hands Say Yeah). The album won a Parents’ Choice Silver Award and it's songs have been featured in commercials for iPhone 6, iPhone 7 plus, Google Android, and Cox Communications.

Arts & Leisure, Martin's second album, released on January 29, 2016. The songs took inspiration from his years as a touring musician and his background in art history. It was featured in many major press outlets, including NPR Music, The New York Times, The New Yorker, and Pitchfork. The Washington Post stated, "Walter Martin is giving art history a fun and lively tone" while All Music said, "Arts & Leisure reveals Martin as a first-rate storyteller who captures the joys of new sights and new ways of thinking in songs full of life and humor."

Martin released his third solo album My Kinda Music on May 5, 2017. It was the second installment of his family album series and would go on win a Parents’ Choice Gold Award. The song "It’s a Dream" was featured in a Casper Mattress Commercial in 2018–2019. On the album's release, NPR Music said, "[Martin’s albums] celebrate the best of humanity; love, innocence, joy, empathy and the wonder of existence itself. It’s the kind of music that can bring tears to your eyes from marveling at all the beauty in the world."

During a surprise performance at NPR Music's Tiny Desk Concert in December 2017, Martin announced his fourth solo album Reminisce Bar & Grill. It was released early the next year on February 18, 2018, and is considered Martin's most adult-focused compilation to date. He has self-described it as his "mid-life crisis album."

Martin's fifth solo album The World at Night was released on January 31, 2020. It was dedicated to his late Jonathan Fire*Eater bandmate Stewart Lupton who died in 2018 of suicide after years of battling addiction, depression, and schizophrenia. Noisey said, "The World at Night is a shockingly good record. It will give you goosebumps; it will make you gasp; it will make you cry. The album feels, above all else, real." Vogue Magazine raved "The World at Night might just be his masterpiece" while All Music said, "The album radiates so much care, empathy, and genuine emotion, listeners can’t help but be touched by it." It was also praised by Pitchfork who stated, "Martin isn't naive; he's just a romantic. At its best, The World at Night evokes the strangest part of mourning: when your eyes fill with tears but they catch the light, making everything look brighter anyway."

== Film and television work ==
Martin wrote and performed the original song, "Do-Dilly-Do (A Friend Like You)" for Laika Studios' Missing Link, The Golden Globes’ 2020 WINNER for Best Animated Feature. He co-wrote and performed on the song "Walking on a String" alongside Phoebe Bridgers and the National's Matt Berninger for Zach Galifianakis' Netflix film Between Two Ferns. His song "Let the Tall Ships Sail," from his 2020 album Green Beans and Tangerines was featured in season two, episode two of the Netflix original series Hilda.

Martin's songs have also been featured in commercials for iPhone 6, iPhone 7 plus, Google Android, Casper Mattress, and Cox Communications.

== Awards ==
Martin received a Clio Silver Award, a Bronze Award at Cannes, and a Gold Award at The One Club for songs he wrote and performed for four films produced for a Cheerios campaign called "Right On Track" that focuses on teaching kids about empathy, inclusion and kindness.

== Personal life ==
Martin lives in upstate New York, with his wife and two daughters.

== Discography ==
Solo

- We're All Young Together (2014)
- Arts + Leisure (2016)
- My Kinda Music (2017)
- Reminisce Bar & Grill (2018)
- The World at Night (2020)
- Green Beans & Tangerines (2020)
- Common Prayers (2020)
- The Bear (2022)
