= Sweet Tea Recording Studio =

24-track recording studio in Oxford, Mississippi, United States

Coordinates: 34.31281°N 89.52072°W

Sweet Tea Recording Studio is a 24-track recording studio in Oxford, Mississippi owned by producer Dennis Herring and operated by Dawn Palladino. It is located near the Oxford square and has clients ranging from Buddy Guy to Modest Mouse.

== Musicians who record at Sweet Tea ==
- Animal Collective
- Actual Tigers
- Gavin Degraw
- Brand New
- The Hives
- Buddy Guy
- Colour Revolt
- Counting Crows
- Cracker
- Elvis Costello
- End of Fashion
- Fischerspooner
- Hed PE
- Jars of Clay
- Jessica Dobson
- James (Jimbo) Mathus
- Modest Mouse
- The Features
- Mutemath
- Rush of Fools
- The Blueskins
- The Crimea
- The Walkmen
- This Club
- Wavves
