= Peter Matthew Bauer =

- Genres: Indie rock
- Occupation: Musician
- Instruments: Vocals, bass guitar, guitar, organ
- Years active: 1996–present
- Label: Mexican Summer
- Website: mexicansummer.com/shop/peter-matthew-bauer-liberation/

Peter Matthew Bauer is an American multi-instrumentalist, singer and songwriter. He is best known as the bass guitarist and organist of the indie rock band The Walkmen, with whom he recorded seven studio albums. Prior to The Walkmen's formation, Bauer and lead vocalist Hamilton Leithauser were both members of the indie rock band The Recoys.

Following The Walkmen's decision to enter an "extreme hiatus", Bauer recorded and released his debut solo album, Liberation!, in 2014, and embarked upon a tour with The Devourers; a newly assembled backing band featuring Fleet Foxes' Skyler Skjelset on guitar.

Bauer released his second studio album, Mount Qaf, in November 2017. Bauer released his third studio album, Flowers, on September 23, 2022. The album was recorded and co-produced with Bauer's Walkmen bandmate, Matt Barrick.

== Backing band ==
Bauer's band, The Devourers, consists of:

- Matt Oliver – guitar
- Skyler Skjelset – guitar
- Mickey Walker – bass
- Jesse McIntosh – drums
- Marisa Brown – vocals, percussion
- Jess Conda – vocals, percussion
- Hillary Ashen – vocals, percussion
- Rachel Hoke – vocals, percussion

== Discography ==
- Liberation! (2014)
- Mount Qaf (2017)
- Flowers (2022)
