= Himawari =

Himawari (kanji:向日葵, hiragana:ひまわり, katakana:ヒマワリ) is the Japanese word for sunflower.

It may refer to:

== Companies ==
- Himawari Theatre Group, located in Ebisunishi, Shibuya, Tokyo

== People with the given name ==
- Himawari Akaho (赤穂 ひまわり; born 1998), Japanese women's basketball player

== Fiction ==
- Himawari Kunogi (九軒ひまわり), a character in the manga and anime xxxHOLiC
- Himawari! (ひまわりっ!), an anime title
- Himawari (nicknamed Hima), a character in the manga and anime Crayon Shin-chan
- Himawari: Kenichi Legend, a Japanese manga series
- Himawari, an NHK Asadora from 1996
- Himawari Uzumaki (うずまきヒマワリ), a character in the manga and anime series Boruto: Naruto Next Generations
- Himawari Furutani (古谷 向日葵), a character in the manga and anime series YuruYuri
- Himawari Shinomiya, a character in the anime series Vividred Operation

== Music ==
=== Albums ===
- Himawari (album), a 2000 album by Swayzak

=== Songs ===
- Himawari (Miho Fukuhara song)
- Himawari (Ado song)
- "Himawari" (ひまわり), a 2004 song by Mai Hoshimura
- "Himawari" (向日葵), a 2003 song by Ai Otsuka
- "Himawari" (ひまわり), a 2005 song by Sugar (group)
- "Himawari" (ひまわり), a song by Kiroro
- "Himawari" (ヒマワリ), a song by Riyu Kosaka
- "Himawari" (ひまわり), a song by Younha
- "Himawari" (ひまわり), a song by Hearts Grow
- "Himawari" (ひまわり), a song by Kusumi Koharu
- "Himawari" (ひまわり), a song by Zigzo
- "Himawari" (向日葵), a song by Becky
- "Himawari" (ひまわり), a song by Yusuke Kamiji
- "Himawari" (向日葵), a song by Mr. Children

== Other uses ==
- Himawari (satellite), a series of Japanese weather satellites
