= The Medicine Label =

- Parent company: Warner Bros.
- Founded: 1992
- Founder: Kevin Patrick
- Status: Inactive
- Country of origin: U.S.
- Location: New York City, New York

The Medicine Label (sometimes called Medicine for short) was a record label founded in New York City in 1992, originally as a subsidiary of Warner Bros. Records. The original purpose of the label was to release "new, cutting-edge music", as Irving Azoff put it. During its initial three years, the label issued early singles by Moby, Leftfield and The Prodigy; as well, The Cramps with their critically acclaimed, alternative radio break through album Flamejob. The label achieved platinum certifications for both the initial soundtrack to Dazed and Confused and a second volume of songs, Even More Dazed and Confused. The label also reissued some obscure titles from the Warner Bros. catalogue including Freeway Madness by The Pretty Things.

In the fall of 1995, with the departure from Warner Bros. of both Azoff and Mo Ostin, label founder Kevin Patrick joined Columbia Records as VP/A&R, bringing Medicine to Sony's RED Distribution for manufacturing and distribution. Through the Sony relationship, Medicine released Tremble Under Boom Lights by Jonathan Fire*Eater, UFOFU, whose members went on to form Secret Machines, Snowboarding in Argentina and Himawari by Swayzak plus releases from Ken Ishii and Super_Collider.

== Notable artists ==
- The Cramps
- Green Apple Quick Step
- Jonathan Fire*Eater
- Swayzak
