= Wolf Songs for Lambs =

Studio album by Jonathan Fire*Eater
- Released: October 7, 1997
- Genre: Indie rock
- Length: 35:18
- Label: DreamWorks

Jonathan Fire*Eater chronology
| Tremble Under Boom Lights (1996) | Wolf Songs for Lambs (1997) |

Singles from Wolf Songs for Lambs
- 1. "When the Curtain Calls for You" Released: 1997; 2. "These Little Monkeys" Released: 1998; 3. "No Love Like That" Released: 1998

Wolf Songs for Lambs is the second and final studio album by American band Jonathan Fire*Eater. The album was the band's major-label debut, released on DreamWorks Records after a bidding war following the hype surrounding the band, in particular their EP from the previous year, Tremble Under Boom Lights. Shortly after the album's release the band split, with Paul Maroon, Matt Barrick, and Walter Martin going on to form The Walkmen with members of the Recoys.

== Reception ==
Professional ratings
Review scores
| Source | Rating |
|---|---|
| AllMusic | 4.5/5 stars |
| Entertainment Weekly | A- |
| NME | 6/10 |
| Pitchfork Media | 6.9/10 |

Reviews for the album were positive, although some critics were reserved in their praise due to the hype surrounding the band and the acclaim for Tremble Under Boom Lights. Stephen Thomas Erlewine from AllMusic wrote that the flawed production "turns out to be a minor complaint, because Jonathan Fire*Eater has such an individual, idiosyncratic sound that even weak moments sound kinetic." He further compared the group to Pavement, the Jon Spencer Blues Explosion, and the Make-Up, and concluded that "while the songwriting is uneven, the record still shows more style, substance and originality than most post-alternative guitar combos" and that while "it may not find Jonathan Fire*Eater fulfilling their potential... [it] remains a strong debut." Entertainment Weekly described it as "a sleeker, more oblique outing, and positively arresting" in comparison to Tremble Under Boom Lights, while The A.V. Club described it as "refreshing" in an era "occupied by overlong, overblown epics like the new Oasis record." In a more mixed but generally positive review, Brent DiCrescenzo of Pitchfork called the album "borderline novelty", but said it "grows on you like a mold" and further conceded he "[imagines] they'd be a better live groove."

== Track listing ==
| No. | Title | Length |
|---|---|---|
| 1. | "When the Curtain Calls for You" | 3:03 |
| 2. | "The Shape of Things That Never Came" | 3:36 |
| 3. | "This is My Room" | 4:09 |
| 4. | "No Love Like That" | 2:53 |
| 5. | "Bipolar Summer" | 2:41 |
| 6. | "I've Changed Hotels" | 3:23 |
| 7. | "Everybody Plays the Mime" | 3:58 |
| 8. | "These Little Monkeys" | 2:30 |
| 9. | "Station Coffee" | 2:24 |
| 10. | "A Night in the Nursery" | 3:55 |
| 11. | "Inpatient Talent Show" | 2:46 |
