= Loops from the Bergerie =

Loops From Bergerie

Studio album by Swayzak
- Released: September 2004
- Genre: Minimal techno, tech house
- Label: !K7

Swayzak chronology
Fabric 11 (2003)	Loops From Bergerie (2004)	Route de La Slack (2006)

Loops from the Bergerie is an album by the group Swayzak. The title of this album comes from the soundtrack for the sixties French movie Les Loups Dans La Bergerie.

== Track listing ==
1. "Keep it Coming" - 5:14
2. "Another Way" - 5:33
3. "Bergerie" - 4:55
4. "My House" - 4:22
5. "Jeune Loup" - 5:57
6. "Snowblind" - 5:04
7. "Then There's Her" - 5:38
8. "8080" - 7:35
9. "Speakeasy" - 4:11
10. "The Long Night" - 5:07
