= Jonathan Fire*Eater =

American indie rock band (1993–1998)

- Origin: Washington, D.C.
- Genre: Indie rock
- Years active: 1993–1998
- Labels: DreamWorks; Medicine
- Spinoffs: The Walkmen; The Childballads
- Past members: Stewart Lupton; Tom Frank; Paul Maroon; Matt Barrick; Walter Martin

Jonathan Fire*Eater was an American indie rock band best known as a progenitor of the post-punk revival in New York City.

The line-up was Stewart Lupton (vocals), Tom Frank (bass), Paul Maroon (guitar and pedal steel), Matt Barrick (drums), and Walter Martin (organs, keyboards). The band broke up during their height in 1998; after the band's break-up, Maroon, Barrick, and Martin went on to form The Walkmen.

== History ==
Jonathan Fire*Eater was formed from a childhood band called The Ignobles. All the members of Jonathan Fire*Eater attended high school at the D.C. private school St. Albans School. Lupton, Martin, and Barrick formed a ska band called the Ignobles while in junior high school. Maroon joined as the guitarist and Ryan Cheney signed on as the vocalist. Lupton played bass. In 1993, the members went to college, mostly in New York City, and Jonathan Fire*Eater was formed with Cheney departing and later joining The Cunning Runts and Lupton taking over vocal duties. St. Albans alum Tom Frank joined as a new bassist.

In 1995, they released their eponymous debut on Tucson, Arizona's Third World Underground Records, which featured "Christmastime, Halloween", "To The Tigers", and other tracks. Later that year, a self-titled EP on PCP established their reputation with the frenetic tracks "The Public Hanging of a Movie Star" and "When Prince Was a Kid".

In 1996, the five-song mini-album Tremble Under Boom Lights was released by The Medicine Label, featuring well-produced offers such as "The Search for Cherry Red" and "Give Me Daughters". Reviews were positive, with AllMusic describing Tremble as "a ferocious record" despite its "minor flaws." By this time, the band was receiving considerable media and industry attention. They were courted by Calvin Klein to model and opened for Brit Pop stars Pulp and Blur. As Lupton said in a 1996 New York Times Magazine profile, "Right now the record companies are sort of circling like vultures."

In early 1997, Jonathan Fire*Eater signed with David Geffen's nascent DreamWorks music label. Their major label debut, Wolf Songs for Lambs, was released by DreamWorks in 1997 to tepid critical response. Not long after the album's release, tensions between Lupton and the other members and a general wariness of mainstream success led to the band's breakup. They played their last show at the Central Park bandshell on July 28, 1998.

Jonathan Fire*Eater was once called "possibly the most hyped young group that nobody has ever heard of".

Maroon, Barrick, and Martin later went on to form The Walkmen and Lupton has pursued his music career through his band The Childballads, who put out their debut album in January 2007. The latter has toured with Cat Power and the Kills. In 2009, he released an EP in a new band, The Beatin's, which he formed with Carole Wagner Greenwood. Titled A Little Give And Take, the limited edition vinyl included Lupton's poetry and the duo's art and writing. Tom Frank pursued a career in journalism as T.A. Frank.

Stewart Lupton died on May 27, 2018, at the age of 43.

== Legacy ==
In addition to being a precursor to the Walkmen, Jonathan Fire*Eater has also been cited as an influence by many of the early New York City-based groups of the post-punk revival, including Interpol and the Yeah Yeah Yeahs, and comparisons were drawn between the band and the Strokes. The Kills, also considered part of the post-punk revival, covered "The Search for Cherry Red"; their version was released as a B-side to their single "Pull A U".

They were featured in the 2017 book Meet Me in the Bathroom: Rebirth and Rock and Roll in New York City.

== Discography ==
=== Albums ===
- Jonathan Fire*Eater (album, 1995, Third World Underground)
- Wolf Songs for Lambs (1997, DreamWorks SKG)

=== Singles and EPs ===
- Jonathan Fire*Eater, a.k.a. The Public Hanging of a Movie Star (EP, 1995, PCP)
- "Give Me Daughters" (1996, Deceptive)
- Tremble Under Boom Lights (1996, Medicine)
- "When the Curtain Calls You" (1997, Deceptive)
- "These Little Monkeys" (1998, Deceptive)
- "No Love Like That" (1998, DreamWorks)
