= Some Other Country =

Studio album by Swayzak
- Released: 27 August 2007
- Genre: Minimal techno, tech house
- Label: !K7

Swayzak chronology
Route de La Slack (2006)	Some Other Country (2007)

Professional ratings
Review scores
Source	Rating
Tiny Mix Tapes	3/5 stars

Some Other Country is the fifth album from the techno group Swayzak, released internationally on 27 August 2007.

== Track listing ==
1. "Quiet Life" (feat. Cassy) - 7:25
2. "So Cheap" - 6:52
3. "No Sad Goodbyes" (feat. Richard Davis) - 5:33
4. "Distress and Calling" - 5:18
5. "Smile and Receive" (feat. Cassy) - 6:18
6. "Claktronic" - 7:07
7. "Silent Luv" (feat. Les Fauves) - 5:58
8. "Pukka Bumbles" - 5:27
9. "By the Rub of Love" - 6:02
10. "They Return" - 6:06
