= Dirty Dancing (album) =

Studio album by Swayzak
- Released: September 24, 2002
- Genre: Minimal techno, tech house
- Label: !K7

Swayzak chronology
Groovetechnology, Vol. 1.3 (2001)	Dirty Dancing (2002)	Fabric 11 (2003)

Professional ratings
Aggregate scores
Source	Rating
Metacritic	60/100
Review scores
Source	Rating
AllMusic	4/5 stars
Pitchfork	6.0/10
Stylus	7.8/10
Tom Hull – on the Web	B+
URB	4/5 stars

Dirty Dancing is the third studio album by the group Swayzak, released September 24, 2002.

== Track listing ==
1. "Make Up Your Mind" (feat. Clair Dietrich) (James Brown, Clair Dietrich, Taylor) - 4:45
2. "Buffalo Seven" (feat. Klaus Kotai) (Brown, Klaus Kotai, Taylor) - 5:14
3. "In the Car Crash" (feat. Headgear) (Konrad Black, James Brown, March21, Taylor) - 6:09
4. "Celsius" (Brown, Taylor) - 5:52
5. "I Dance Alone" (feat. Carl Finlow & Nicola Kuperus) (Adult., Brown, Carl Finlow, Taylor) - 4:25
6. "The Punk Era" (Brown, Taylor) - 3:55
7. "Halfway to Yesterday" (feat. Jeremy) (Brown, March21, Taylor) - 3:11
8. "Take My Hand" (Brown, Taylor) - 4:31
9. "Sob 1" (feat. Clair Dietrich) (Brown, Dietrich, Taylor) - 6:11
10. "Ping Pong" (Brown, Taylor) - 7:20

== Personnel ==
- Adult. – vocals
- Rashad Becker – mastering
- David Brown – producer
- Clair Dietrich – vocals
- Carl Finlow – vocals
- Headgear – vocals
- Kotai – vocals
- Swayzak – vocals
- James Taylor – producer
