= Rainbow (Miho Fukuhara album) =

Studio album by Miho Fukuhara
- Released: January 28, 2009
- Recorded: 2008
- Genre: R&B; pop; soul
- Length: 51:06
- Label: Sony
- Producer: Miho Fukuhara

Singles from Rainbow
- 1. "Change" Released: April 16, 2008; 2. "Himawari" Released: July 16, 2008; 3. "Yasashii Aka" Released: November 5, 2008; 4. "Love: Winter Song" Released: December 10, 2008; 5. "Yuki no Hikari" Released: January 28, 2009

Rainbow is the debut album by Japanese singer Miho Fukuhara. It peaked at No. 2 on the Oricon charts and has sold 200,000 copies to date.

== Track listing ==
CD
No.	Title	Lyrics	Music	Arranger(s)	Length
1.	"Change"	Fukuhara	Fukuhara, 2Soul	2Soul	3:56
2.	"Anymore"	Fukuhara	Fukuhara, 2Soul	2 Soul	4:57
3.	"Lose Control"	Fukuhara	Fukuhara, 2Soul	2 Soul	4:22
4.	"Yuki no Hikari (雪の光; The Snow's Light)"	Fukuhara	Fukuhara, Hiroo Yamaguchi	Makoto Minagawa	4:34
5.	"Everybody Needs Someone"	Fukuhara, mavie	Nina Woodford, Fraser T Smith	Nina Woodford、Fraser T. Smith	3:41
6.	"On Top of the World"	Sandi Thom, Simon Perry, David Thomas	Thom, Perry, Thomas	Thom, Perry, Thomas	4:08
7.	"Himawari (ひまわり; Sunflower)"	Fukuhara	Fukuhara, Yamaguchi	Makoto Minagawa	4:56
8.	"Love: Winter Song (album version)"	Fukuhara	Fukuhara, Hyōe Yasuhara	Hyōe Yasuhara	4:31
9.	"Getting There"	Fukuhara	Fromm, DeNicola, Maloney	Makoto Minagawa	3:52
10.	"Dorima (ドリーマー; Dreamer)"	Kana	Kana	Makoto Minagawa	4:23
11.	"Ice & Fire"	Fukuhara, mavie	Corinne Bailey Rae, Yo Yo	Corinne Bailey Rae, Yo Yo, Makoto Minagawa	3:51
12.	"Yasashii Aka (優しい赤; Gentle Red)"	Fukuhara	Yuka Kawamura	Hyōe Yasuhara	4:55

== Charts ==
Release	Chart	Peak position	Debut sales (copies)	Sales total (copies)
January 1, 2008	Oricon Daily Chart	2	7,000+ (first day)	93,300+
January 1, 2008	Oricon Weekly Chart	2	44,731	93,300+
January 1, 2008	Oricon Monthly Chart	3	77,182	93,300+
January 1, 2008	Billboard Japan Top Album Sales	2		93,300+

=== Certifications from Rainbow ===
- From Rainbow

- "Yasashii Aka"

Japan downloads certification: platinum (100,000)

- "Love: Winter Song"

Japan downloads certification: gold (100,000)
