= Miho Fukuhara =

Japanese singer (born 1987)

Miho Fukuhara 福原美穂
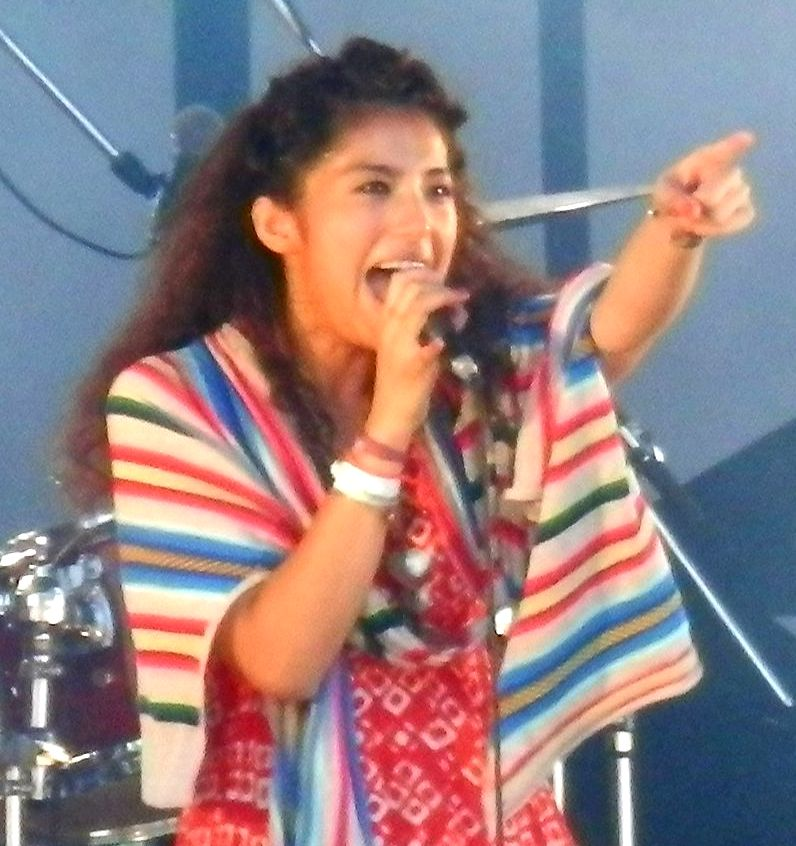
- Miho Fukuhara at Join Alive rock festival in Iwamizawa, Hokkaido (2013)

Background information
- Born: 福原 美穂; June 19, 1987 (age 39)
- Origin: Sapporo, Japan
- Genres: J-pop; pop; R&B; soul
- Occupations: Singer, songwriter, actress, model, spokesperson
- Instruments: Vocals, piano
- Years active: 2006–present
- Labels: Yumechika Records (2006–2007) gr8! Records (2008–2014); Happy Field Records (2015–present)
- Website: www.fukuharamiho.com

Miho Fukuhara (福原 美穂, Fukuhara Miho) (born June 19, 1987) is a Japanese singer, songwriter and actress who made an independent label debut in 2006, releasing a single titled "The Roots" and mini-album titled Step Out. In early 2008, she made her major-label debut under Sony Music Entertainment Japan. Her single, "Change", was the number ninety-two song on the Billboard Japan Hot 100 Singles year-end charts for 2008. With her single, "Let It Out", she had her first major anime tie-in with Fullmetal Alchemist: Brotherhood.

In early 2013, Fukuhara signed on to be the frontwoman of the worldwide music project Sweetbox, along with rapper/singer LogiQ Pryce. In 2015, she set up her own record label Happy Field Records.

== Early life ==
Fukuhara was born in Sapporo, Hokkaido in the countryside, and brought up with five siblings. She has one-quarter American ancestry through her grandfather, whom she never met.

She credits her parents, especially her father who owned a large record collection, and her elder sister for having introduced her to soul and blues music at a young age.

== Career ==
=== Singing career ===
==== Early career (2006–2008) ====
Fukuhara was initially signed to the independent, local Sapporo-based Yumechika Records label and released her debut single and mini-album, titled "The Roots" and Step Out respectively. She performed in-store live performances to promote her records during 2006, which prompted Sony Music Japan to pick her up as a performing artist. Her first major-released appearance was on a Celine Dion tribute album singing "Because You Loved Me".

She released her first single in early 2008 to varied success. Penning her own lyrics and co-producing the song, "Change" was a hit in terms of radio airplay, reaching as high as the top 3, but only managing the 14th position in terms of sales. The single came in only one format, which is unusual for Japanese maxi singles. She released her second single, "Himawari", which narrowly made the top 25 in the sales category but failed to impact top 10 in terms of airplay. It was not until her third single, Yasashii Aka, that she had real major success. It was, first and foremost, her first single to be released in multiple formats. Although it was neither as strong on airplay or as a seller as "Change" was, it sold well digitally, and become her first single to become certified by the RIAJ. It was the number 17 song of December 2008 and quickly become certified gold. Her follow-up song, "Love (Winter Song)" would match the success of "Yasashii Aka" similarly and ultimately surpass it, also going gold and becoming the number 10 song of January 2009.

==== Mainstream success (2009–2012) ====
Fukuhara released the album Rainbow, which was mainly penned and co-produced by Fukuhara herself, in January 2009, with "Yuki no Hikari" as the digital/radio single helping to promote the album. "Yuki no Hikari" peaked at #50 on the Japan Hot 100, becoming her lowest charting single. With strong label backing, however, the album peaked at #2 and was beat only by the successful 7th album by legendary pop-star Kumi Koda. Rainbow went on to sell nearly 100,000 copies and become certified gold by the Recording Industry Association of Japan. Fukuhara later embarked on the successful Rainbow Tour 2009, which spanned six shows in multiple cities. She performed a mix of covers, original songs from Rainbow, and b-sides.

Following her album, she released her next single "Hanabi Sky" in June 2009. It was another major airplay hit, peaking at number 3. Overall, the single peaked at number 5, but only received number 26 for sales. She quickly announced her next single, "Let It Out", second ending theme to popular anime Fullmetal Alchemist: Brotherhood in early July. "Let It Out" is both Fukuhara's first major anime tie-in and her first single to be released in 3 separate formats, and was released on September 9, 2009. While it was a much bigger hit than "Hanabi Sky", it still fared relatively poorly in terms of both physical and digital sales in comparison to her previous singles "Love (Winter Song)", "Change" and "Yasashii Aka". Leading up to the release of her second studio album Music Is My Life (2010), Fukuhara released the singles "Nande Nakitaku Nacchau n Darō" (2009), "Mirai" (2010) and "Moshikashite" (2010).

In 2010, Fukuhara began releasing conceptual extended plays. The first, Regrets of Love, featured ballads, while the second two in 2011, The Soul Extreme EP and The Soul Extreme EP II, featured soul and R&B music. The leading track of The Soul Extreme EP, "O2", featured R&B singer Ai, and became a commercial success, with her record label tracking 300,000 legal downloads of the song.

Fukuhara's third album The Best of Soul Extreme was released in June 2012, led by the single "Dream On" featuring Daichi Miura. The album featured a second duet with Ai, as well as a song performed with Leona Lewis.

==== Sweetbox and parting with Sony (2013–2015) ====
In early 2013, it was announced that Fukuhara signed on to be the newest frontwoman of the worldwide pop music project Sweetbox along with male singer/rapper LogiQ Pryce. The two recorded their first album Z21 in the first part of 2013 and released their first single "#Z21 (#Zeitgeist21)" in June 2013, shortly after Miho released her singles "Rising Heart", a song used in a campaign for Coca-Cola, and "Beyond", a song used for the anime Space Brothers.

In 2014, Fukuhara parted ways with Sony Music Japan, and became an independent musician. In a music industry wide poll taken from the popular TV program Wednesday's Downtown, Fukuhara was ranked as the seventh most talented singer in Japan.

==== Happy Field Records (2015–present) ====
In 2015, Fukuhara set up her own record label Happy Field Records (named after the English translation of her name, Fukuhara) and released an extended play entitled Something New on December 23, along with the music video for her promotional single "Something New" on December 25. The music video focuses on her pregnancy and the upcoming birth of her daughter.

Her next EP release was in 2019 with Love Don't Come Easy.

In November 2020, Fukuhara began releasing a variety of music regularly on her official YouTube channel, from stripped-down acoustic versions of her own music to covers of famous songs in both Japanese and English.

On March 11, 2022, Fukuhara participated in the Shuichi "Ponta" Murakami tribute concert "One Last Live", performing "Respect" (with Maki Ohguro).

=== Acting career ===
In 2012, Fukuhara debuted as an actress on the musical comedy Kaeru no Ojōsama as Minami Haneda, a member of a singing group called Chansons. As a member of the cast, she performed music throughout the series.

Fukuhara made her stage debut in 2023 with the musical Dreamgirls, in which she portrayed Effie White.

== Artistry ==
Fukuhara has named Aretha Franklin, Marvin Gaye, Mariah Carey, Chaka Khan, Stevie Wonder, Al Green, The Beatles, Roberta Flack, Prince, Otis Redding, Sly and the Family Stone, The Rolling Stones, Alicia Keys, Lauryn Hill, Sade, TLC, Bill Withers, Curtis Mayfield and Whitney Houston among her musical influences. She particularly credits Franklin's Lady Soul, Gaye's What's Going On, Wonder's Songs in the Key of Life and Carey's Music Box for deepening her relationship to music. Among newer artists, she named D'Angelo, Solange and Michael Kiwanuka as having released albums that influenced her. She also enjoys music from Kylie Minogue and Charlie Puth.

== Personal life ==
Fukuhara met her husband at Arabaki Rock Festival. On March 4, 2016, she gave birth to their daughter, Sophie.

Her favourite manga is Slam Dunk.

== Discography ==
=== Studio albums ===
- Rainbow (2008)
- Music Is My Life (2010)
- The Best of Soul Extreme (2012)

=== Compilation albums ===
- A Gift for You (2014)

== Concert tours ==
- Rainbow Tour (2009)
- 2009-nen Gakuensai Tour (2009)
- Sing a Song Tour (2010)
- Live in Music Vol. 1 (2010)
- Live in Music Vol. 3 (2011)
- "The Best of Soul Extreme" Tour (2012)
- Live in Music Vol. 4 (2012)
- Miho Fukuhara 5th Anniversary Party "Rising Heart!!" (2013)
- Live in Music Vol. 5 (2013)
- Miho Fukuhara & the Mardi Gras Combo Tour (2014)
