= List of Space Brothers episodes =

Space Brothers (宇宙兄弟, Uchū Kyōdai) is a 2012 Japanese anime television series produced by A-1 Pictures based on the original manga series by Chūya Koyama. The story follows a man named Mutta Nanba who one day gets the chance to follow his younger brother Hibito and become an astronaut. The series aired in Japan from April 1, 2012, to March 22, 2014, and was also simulcasted on Crunchyroll. The series has been licensed by Sentai Filmworks in North America.

== Episodes ==
=== 1st year ===
No.	Title	Original release date	Viewership ratings (Kantō Area)
1	"Little Brother Hibito and Big Brother Mutta"; Transliteration: "Otōto Hibito to Ani Mutta" (Japanese: 弟ヒビトと兄ムッタ)	April 1, 2012	3.3
In the summer of 2006, brothers Hibito and Mutta Nanba spot a strange UFO which flies off to the Moon. In 2025, Hibito has since become an astronaut who is due to go on a mission towards the Moon. Mutta, on the other hand, has just been fired from his job at an automobile company for head-butting his supervisor and has to move in with his parents. Upon hearing about Mutta's job loss, Hibito sends him an e-mail telling him to listen to the tape they recorded on that day in 2006. In the tape, the young Mutta, upon hearing Hibito's desire to go to the Moon, decided his goal would be to go one step further and aim for Mars. A month later, Mutta receives a letter from JAXA saying he has been accepted for an astronaut program.
2	"My Shining Star"; Transliteration: "Ore no Kin Pika" (Japanese: 俺の金ピカ)	April 8, 2012	3.9
Mutta, who is unsure about whether he should take the astronaut exam, visits an old astronomy friend named Sharon Kaneko, who encourages him to go for it. Mutta takes the first exam and manages to successfully pass. As Mutta becomes a bit concerned when he is distracted by a loose screw on his chair during the interviews for the second exam, he makes friends with another applicant, Kenji Makabe, whilst gaining a crush on a female applicant, Serika Itou. Meanwhile, behind doors, the interviewer reveals that he fiddled with the chair on purpose to see who would notice, with Mutta, Kenji and Serika allegedly being the only ones who did.
3	"The Man with the Advantage and the Running Female Doctor"; Transliteration: "Yūri na Otoko to Hashiru Joi" (Japanese: 有利な男と走る女医)	April 15, 2012	3.1
Medical exams begin and Mutta feels a bit of pressure with everyone thinking he has an advantage being Hibito's brother. Later that evening, Serika takes an interest in Mutta when she spots him peeking inside an astronaut suit's helmet, reminding her of her father. The next day, Mutta and Keiji spot Serika doing the exact same thing.
4	"Next to Hibito"; Transliteration: "Hibito no Tonari" (Japanese: 日々人の隣)	April 22, 2012	3.1
The final part of the second round of examinations is an interview, with Mutta facing a little difficulty when he is asked an obscure question at the end of his interview. Meanwhile, Hibito hears of a family support program. As the exams come to a close, Mutta becomes worried about how he did in his interview, but cheers up when Kenji gets him Serika's e-mail address. The next day, Mutta receives a call from Hibito who invites him to come to Houston to spend some time at NASA.
5	"Days of Missing"; Transliteration: "Tarinai Hibi" (Japanese: 足りない日々)	April 29, 2012	2.1
Mutta arrives in Houston where he meets up with Hibito, along with his pet pug, Apo. At his home, Hibito points out to Mutta that he has lost his competitiveness with him. The next day, Mutta talks with dog walkers Mr. and Mrs. Smith, who teach him a bit about how Hibito thinks of him. Later, Mutta decides to be a bit more competitive with Hibito. Meanwhile, back at JAXA, one of the judges seems to be against Mutta's application.
6	"Et Cetera in My Head"; Transliteration: "Atama ni Matsuwaru Eto Setora" (Japanese: 頭にまつわるエトセトラ)	May 6, 2012	2.6
As Mutta arrives at the Johnson Space Center to observe Hibito's training, one of the JAXA judges brings up the reason Mutta was fired from his previous job. As Hibito appears on a television show that night, Mutta is surprised when Hibito starts praising him. Just then, Mutta receives a call from his former workmates informing them of what his former boss had told JAXA. As Mutta becomes convinced he has lost his chance of becoming an astronaut, one of the other JAXA judges, Hoshika, who had been observing Mutta and Hibito's constant visits to JAXA since they were kids, meets up with Mutta's former workmates to get the whole story.
7	"Dear Hibito"; Transliteration: "Haikei Hibito" (Japanese: 拝啓日々人)	May 13, 2012	3.4
As Hibito notices Mutta acting strangely, he suspects that something is up. Mutta eventually confesses about his high chance of failure, and appears to have resided to think he has no chance. Meanwhile, Hoshika has trouble trying to convince another judge to change his mind about Mutta. As Mutta spends time with the pet walkers following being told off by Hibito, the restaurant he is visiting is attacked by a fire extinguisher wielding robber.
8	"Smoky Heaven"; Transliteration: "Hakuen Tengoku" (Japanese: 白煙天国)	May 20, 2012	3.4
As Mutta's somehow manages to apprehend the robber by chance, he gains a lot of attention and is praised as a hero on a live TV broadcast, which is seen by Hibito and the JAXA judges. Afterwards, Mutta receives a video message from his parents, revealing he has passed the second exam. Before leaving for Japan, Mutta discovers a hidden set of wills written by Hibito which leaves him concerned.
9	"Individual Resolve"; Transliteration: "Sorezore no Kakugo" (Japanese: それぞれの覚悟)	May 27, 2012	3.3
As he arrives in Japan, Mutta remains concerned about the wills Hibito wrote before going outside to see the International Space Station in the sky. Later, he meets up with Kenji and Serika to celebrate making it to the third exam. The three talk about their motives for going into space, with Serika wanted to go on the ISS, despite the fact it will probably be shut down by the time she makes it to space. He hears from another colleague that she wants to carry on the dream of her late father to develop medicine to cure a disease, which can only be done on the ISS.
10	"Running Bus"; Transliteration: "Basu Basu Hashiru" (Japanese: バスバス走る)	June 3, 2012	3.0
Before heading off to JAXA for the third exam, Mutta visits Sharon who tells him not to worry about not having a reason to go into space like Serika and Kenji has. As the exam begins, the applicants board a strange bus supposedly heading towards a top secret facility, with only Kenji noticing there are cameras on board. An hour into the journey, they begin an exercise in which each applicant spends ten minutes talking to each other. Afterwards, they are asked to fill in a survey ranking everyone's potential to be an astronaut, followed by a meal and a rest before the bus arrives somewhere.
11	"Trapped Rivals"; Transliteration: "Tojikomerareta Raibaru Tachi" (Japanese: 閉じ込められたライバル達)	June 10, 2012	2.4
Arriving at an undisclosed location, the applicants are shown footage of the last moments of a group of astronauts before they died due to a chute failure upon reentry, in order to determine their willingness to continue with the exam. After everyone agrees to continue with the exam, the group is split up into three teams with each team spending two weeks together in a sealed environment before determining which two of them would make the best astronauts. Mutta is placed in a team with Serika, Reiji Nitta, Naoto Fukuda and Yasushi Furuya. The first assignment involves figuring out what the current time is, where Mutta comes up with a surprisingly precise answer.
12	"My Name Is Itou Serika"; Transliteration: "Watashi no Namae wa Itō Serika Desu" (Japanese: わたしの名前は伊東せりかです)	June 17, 2012	3.8
Mutta comes up with a method for his prediction, hiding the fact he had simply noticed what time it was when he left the bus. As Serika's hunger keeps her up, she recalls when she asked her father what the meaning behind her name was. The next morning, as the teams have to decide how to handle the food supply, they also discuss how to go about deciding which two candidates to pick to be astronauts. After everyone on Team A introduces themselves, Serika decides to let Mutta call her by her first name.
13	"3-D Ant"; Transliteration: "San Jigen Ari" (Japanese: 3次元アリ)	June 24, 2012	2.8
Reiji grows concerned about a heart monitoring bracelet everyone is wearing, as well as a rule in which if one team member leaves, the entire team is disqualified. After a few physical and mental tasks, the teams are tasked with writing a letter to win over a journalist who is critical of space exploration. Mutta recalls when he and Hibito went to a lecture held by Soichi Noguchi about how seeing things from a different perspectives brings new solutions. After thinking about the story, Mutta decides the right action is not to protest but instead show her the third dimension offered by outer space, which will be made apparent once Hibito reaches the Moon.
14	"Broken Glasses and the Sole of the Foot"; Transliteration: "Kowareta Megane to Ashi no Ura" (Japanese: 壊れたメガネと足の裏)	July 1, 2012	3.3
As Naoto recalls how his work in developing a crewed spacecraft alienated him from his family, his glasses get broken when they are accidentally stepped on by Yasushi. Despite his reduced visibility, Naoto becomes determined to not let it stop him. After Yasushi hears from Serika about how Naoto quit his job in order to get a chance for astronaut selection, he swallows his pride and asks mission control to order new glasses for him.
15	"Let's Talk About Space"; Transliteration: "Uchū no Hanashi o Shiyō" (Japanese: 宇宙の話をしよう)	July 8, 2012	3.0
As the JAXA staff decide to order Naoto new glasses as per Yasushi's request, Hoshika steps in to observe the exam. The next day, as Team B is put on edge when an alarm starts going off in the middle of the night, Team A discovers their clock has gone missing, later finding it smashed. The applicants are soon tasked with completing a blank puzzle within three hours. As the situation in Team A becomes tense as Yasushi accuses Serika of breaking the clock, Mutta tries to calm the situation by having everyone talk about space, getting them to consider JAXA broke the clock so they could learn to depend on their own sense of time whilst hiding the fact he saw Naoto break the clock.
16	"Alarm, but No Clock"; Transliteration: "Arāmu Ari Tokei Nashi" (Japanese: アラームアリ時計ナシ)	July 15, 2012	3.6
After the puzzle challenge ends before anyone manages to complete it, Mutta confronts Naoto about what he saw, but he only tasks him with finding out the reason why he broke the clock. Meanwhile, Team B continues to be plagued by the mysterious alarm, which is secretly being controlled by one of the participants, and soon find their clock has been tampered with as well. Meanwhile, as Serika grows concerned that she's used too much food for cooking, with not much left for the remaining four days, Team A is soon given their own alarm problem.
17	"The Culprit Is in the Room"; Transliteration: "Hannin wa Kono Naka ni Iru" (Japanese: 犯人はこの中にいる)	July 22, 2012	2.6
As Team A searches for the mysterious alarm, Mutta notices some strange behaviour in Yasushi. Having been reminded about the cameras by Naoto, Mutta believes JAXA is behind these incidents. He recalls what he learnt whilst visiting Houston, in which green cards are given to astronauts in training instructing them to create problems. Thus, Mutta correctly deduces that both Naoto and Yasushi had been given green cards ordering them to break the clock and set off the alarm. Later, Serika confesses about the food shortage to Mutta, who mistakenly believes it to be another green card order.
18	"Roo-ra! Kenji!"; Transliteration: "Kape! Kenji!" (Japanese: かぺ!けんじ!)	July 29, 2012	2.7
After a few more green card related incidents, Mutta is given his own green card, prompting him to make random noises throughout the day. Meanwhile, as Team B continues facing issues, Kenji is put under pressure when he is told to withdraw from the selections, feeling he has done nothing to improve teamwork. As Kenji seriously contemplates withdrawing, he recalls what his daughter said to him, realising she was telling him to do his best and regaining his confidence.
19	"The Day Before Goodbye"; Transliteration: "Saraba no Mae no Hi" (Japanese: さらばの前の日)	August 5, 2012	3.8
As the exam approaches its final few days, Kenji gets to know his teammates better, which Hoshika musing that he didn't give Kenji a green card earlier in order to test his leadership skills. Meanwhile in Team A, as Mutta reveals they don't have any food left for tomorrow, he manages to gather some ingredients for making udon noodles. Remembering how he learnt it from Sharon along with Hibito, Mutta gets everyone to make udon together. Having not had anyone share his interest in space whilst he was in school, Mutta becomes pleasantly surprised when everyone else becomes surprised over how he knows Sharon, and they spend time talking about space together. The mood soon heavies when they are reminded they still need to choose two people to become astronauts.
20	"The Worst Possible Punishment"; Transliteration: "Ichiban Hidoi Shiuchi" (Japanese: 一番酷い仕打ち)	August 12, 2012	2.3
As the last day of the exam arrives, the teams are told to do what they want for the rest of the day before deciding on their selections, so Team A decides to clean up the place. As Team A struggles to decide on a method of choosing two astronauts, Mutta recalls the advice Sharon gave him and suggests they decide via a game of rock, paper, scissors so that everyone has a fair chance. As Yasushi accepts to this, he shows off his recordings of everyone's scores, revealing he's been in a last place. Mutta reveals that he got the idea to use rock, paper, scissors from Yasushi, and he agrees to go along with it.
21	"A Long-Awaited Glimpse of the Sky"; Transliteration: "Hisashiburi no Sora" (Japanese: 久しぶりの空)	August 19, 2012	2.7
After Team A decide their selections after one round, the third exam comes to its end and Team A is met with applause from the staff. Upon venturing out into the open sky again, the applicants discover they had been at JAXA the entire time. As Mutta and Kenji discuss how those who weren't selected may still have a chance, Yasushi, who lost out in the match, visits a much-admired professor, Hiroto Baba, who shows him his newly designed spacesuit. Whilst heading for a celebratory meal with the rest of Team A, Yasushi recalls how he got interested in space, but was troubled that he was too short to become an astronaut. This led him to admire Baba when he invented a smaller spacesuit which lowered the minimum height requirement to become an astronaut.
22	"Working on the Dream"; Transliteration: "Yume no Tochū" (Japanese: 夢の途中)	September 2, 2012	2.8
Team A get together to celebrate the winners of the match, Serika and Reiji, on passing the third exam. Meanwhile, the JAXA staff have discussions about which of the remaining candidates to select, with Hoshika pointing out how Team A was the only one who promised to get together upon leaving. Four days later, it is revealed Houston will select one male from the remaining candidates to join the others, with Mutta assuming Kenji is likely to be chosen over him. As Mutta worries about his lack of luck, Hibito carries on his training, curious about what Mutta's reply will be. As Mutta hangs out with Naoto, it is revealed that Mutta had been chosen to go to Houston which both excites Mutta but also causes him to be concerned about Kenji.
23	"Father, Son, and Mutta Claus"; Transliteration: "Oyaji to Musuko to Mutta Kurōsu" (Japanese: 親父と息子とムッタクロース)	September 9, 2012	3.1
Mutta takes up a part-time job as a shopping mall Santa to earn some money before his trip to Houston. Meanwhile, Yuri Teshima, one of the candidates from Team B, shows his father his passion for extra terrestrial life. As Mutta hears from JAXA about when he is to depart for Houston, he learns that Kenji was in fact chosen alongside him, as Yuri had decided to turn down his application to pursue a career in marine biology. Serika visits her father's grave, leaving a diary of everything she got up to in the past year, whilst Mutta visits Kenji. With the final exam in two months, coinciding with Hibito's mission into space, Mutta decides to head to Houston ahead of schedule.
24	"The Worst Possible Interviewer"; Transliteration: "Saiaku no Shinsain" (Japanese: 最悪の審査員)	September 16, 2012	2.6
As Hibito trains to use a space vehicle for his Moon mission, Mutta does some lawn mowing for Ozzy. Later, Mutta has dinner with Jennifer and Lowry, Hibito's backup, where he learns the examiner for the final exams will be Takio Azuma, who allegedly holds a grudge against Hibito for being selected to go on the Moon instead of him, putting Mutta at a disadvantage.
25	"Sonic Little Brother Training Big Brother"; Transliteration: "Mahha no Otōto Kin Tore Ani" (Japanese: マッハの弟 筋トレ兄)	September 23, 2012	2.2
As Hibito recalls how he came to admire Azuma, he tells Mutta how his final astronaut selection exam was an interview with one of the Japanese astronauts. As Mutta ponders how he should spend his time before the exam, he witnesses Hibito piloting a jet craft, reminding Mutta of how he came to support him. As the day count down towards Hibito's launch, Mutta trains his body and mind with Ozzy to prepare for his interview. Seven days before the launch, as Hibito is moved into quarantine, Serika and the other candidates travel with Mutta's parents to Houston.
26	"Painful Interview"; Transliteration: "Itami o Tomonau Mensetsu" (Japanese: 痛みを伴う面接)	September 30, 2012	3.0
As the day of the final exam arrives, Nanba is hindered by aching leg muscles due to all the squats he did the other day. After entering the interview room and meeting the examiners, including Azuma and Soichi Noguchi, Mutta sits down only for his chair to break due to a combination of a screw loosened by one of the examiners and Mutta's tenseness in hiding his cramps. After the interviews end, the candidates have a celebratory meal with the examiners. Unbeknownst to the candidates, the interview was a decoy intended to drop their guard as the examiners make observations outside of an exam environment. As Mutta is secretly probed for his observations on the other candidates, he comes face to face with Azuma.
27	"One Question"; Transliteration: "Hitotsu no Shitsumon" (Japanese: 一つの質問)	October 7, 2012	2.4
As Mutta decides to converse with Azuma, he asks him a question that another astronaut previously asked him; "Are you prepared to die?". Mutta gives an honest reply that he would try to survive if possible, which is similar to how both Azuma and Hibito answered the same question. As Mutta and other candidates head off to Florida, he recalls how he and Hibito spent months trying to get footage of the UFO they say, since no one else saw it due to the Zidane headbutt incident. Upon arriving in Florida, Mutta and his parents go to see Hibito, giving him a DVD-R titled "The Miracle of Doha" to take to the moon with him.
28	"Miracle of Doha"; Transliteration: "Dōha no Kiseki" (Japanese: ドーハのきせき)	October 14, 2012	2.6
Hibito recalls how Mutta was bullied by those who didn't believe him about the UFO. Wanting to find proof of UFOs existing in order to stop the bullying without resorting to violence himself, he decided to make his own UFO, giving the footage he filmed to Mutta for his 13th birthday. Despite obviously telling it was a fake, Mutta appreciated the thought and treasured the DVD. When the bullies started turning on Hibito instead, Mutta fought against them with his headbutt.
29	"Night Before Launch"; Transliteration: "Uchiage Zen'ya" (Japanese: 打ち上げ前夜)	October 21, 2012	3.5
The Mares V rocket containing parts for the construction of a moonbase is successfully launched into space. On the night before Hibito's launch, Mutta is visited by his mother, who expresses her concerns about the launch. On the morning of the launch, NASA reports a 60% chance of the launch being postponed due to the weather, but Hibito remains optimistic that the launch will go ahead. As Mutta and Kenji visit the news center for updates on the weather, a kid with a punk hairstyle sets Apo loose.
30	"Dog, Old Man, and Alexander"; Transliteration: "Inu to Jijii to Arekusandā" (Japanese: 犬とじじいとアレクサンダー)	October 28, 2012	2.9
As Mutta and the others search for Apo, Mutta finds Apo and is driven off by a strange NASA employee named Deneil Young, who takes Mutta for a ride to a place featuring abandoned training facilities. Reaching the top of an old blockhouse, Mutta is treated to a spectacular view of the launchpad. As the Mares I finally lifts off, Mutta stands back and watches in awe.
31	"Rocket Road"; Transliteration: "Roketto Rōdo" (Japanese: ロケットロード)	November 4, 2012	1.8
As Hibito and his crew finally make it into the weightlessness of space, Mutta thinks back to when he and Hibito attended a broadcast of Akihiko Hoshide aboard the ISS, answering Hibito's question and giving him the encouragement to become an astronaut. Back in the present, Deneil reveals to Mutta that he was the one who taught Hibito to fly a jet, saying they will meet again on the airfield should Mutta be selected.
32	"A Private Place"; Transliteration: "Haitte wa Ikenai Basho" (Japanese: 入ってはいけない場所)	November 11, 2012	2.6
As the candidates celebrate Hibito's launch, they are informed they will return to Japan and will hear of the results a week after Hibito lands on the Moon, though Mutta opts to stay in Houston until Hibito lands on the Moon. Later on, Hibito gives an interview aboard the Orion as it makes its journey to the Moon, which is broadcast across Japan. As Mutta spends time with Jennifer, she shows him Azuma with his family. As Mutta goes to greet them, Azuma shakes his hand and invites him to join them, where he learns more about him from his wife. Later that night, Azuma recalls the pressures he faced from the press after orbiting the Moon and how it was Brian Jay who recommended Hibito to be the first to walk on the Moon.
33	"Moon Rabbit"; Transliteration: "Tsuki no Usagi" (Japanese: 月のウサギ)	November 18, 2012	3.5
As the Orion approaches the Moon for landing, Hibito receives a video message from Mutta. The whole of Japan tunes in early in the morning to watch the live broadcast of the Moon landing, which Hibito manages to pull off successfully. As Hibito prepares to take his first steps on the Moon's surface, he recalls Mutta's video message, assuring him of Azuma's approval. With that in mind, Hibito turns his first step into what would come to be known as 'the Moon jump', although Mutta is a little embarrassed by Hibito's 'inspiration first words'.
34	"Pug and Hug on a Moonlit Night"; Transliteration: "Tsukiyo no Ban ni Pagu to Hagu" (Japanese: 月夜の晩にパグとハグ)	November 25, 2012	2.5
As the Moon mission begins its progress, Hibito notices something shiny on the Moon's surface before helping to ease the tension of the rest of the crew. Meanwhile, Mutta arrives back in Japan, bring Apo home with him, hoping he will bring him luck in passing the exam. Whilst grocery shopping, Mutta ends up winning a consolation prize in a lottery, believing he has used up all his luck and becoming paranoid. On the day of the selection announcement, Kenji is the first to be called by JAXA.
35	"From the Little Corner of a Big Facility"; Transliteration: "Dadappiroi Shisetsu no Hon no Ikkaku kara" (Japanese: だだっ広い施設の ほんの一角から)	December 2, 2012	2.7
As Kenji receives his call from JAXA, he thinks back to how his life was before all of this. Though he was generally satisfied with his job, he had always wanted something more. He also recalls when he first met his wife, Yuki, who would later be the one who told him about the astronaut selection programme. This changed his daily life a little more as he began to study towards his dreams. As the results are finally announced, Kenji learns that he has passed the exam to the delight of his family.
36	"Dancing Astronaut"; Transliteration: "Odoru Uchū Hikōshi" (Japanese: 踊る宇宙飛行士)	December 9, 2012	2.9
As Serika visits her father's grave after hearing about her results, she recalls her childhood. Being a biologist who studied 'little universes', Rinpei Itou inspired Serika to want to be an astronaut. Rinpei soon became hospitalised with a paralyzing brain disorder, so he asked Serika to start a journal to tell him about her daily life. Rinpei's condition soon worsened, as his condition was revealed to be a rare disease. Reading up on Chiaki Mukai, who was an astronaut who developed cures aboard the ISS, Serika became determined to be the same so she could find a cure for Rinpei's condition. However, he died soon afterwards. Having learnt that she has passed her exams, Serika celebrates with a nostalgic ice pop.
37	"Two Men in the Park"; Transliteration: "Kōen ni Ossan Futari" (Japanese: 公園におっさん2人)	December 16, 2012	2.4
As Mutta becomes anxious about whether he has enough luck to pass, Hoshika decides to share the load of revealing the results. The first person he calls is Mizoguchi, who is shocked to learn he has failed as he was always the top in everything he did. When asked why he failed, Hoshika explains it is his lack of depending on others that caused him to fail. Afterwards, Hoshika asks Mutta to meet him at the park, where he personally reveals that Mutta has passed his exam. Hoshika then takes Mutta straight to the press conference.
38	"Eleventh E-mail"; Transliteration: "Jū Ikken Me no Mēru" (Japanese: 11件目のメール)	December 23, 2012	2.9
Upon arriving at the conference building, Mutta meets with some of the unsuccessful applicants before heading to the main hall, where he is greeted by Serika, Kenji and Reiji, along with Team B's Ena Kitamura. As Hoshika gives Hibito the news of Mutta's success, Mutta manages to get through the conference without messing up. As the gang get together following the conference, Naoto joins them in celebration whilst Yasushi sends Mutta various texts congratulation him, explaining how he was always rooting for him.
39	"Lunar Illusions"; Transliteration: "Tsuki no Sakkaku" (Japanese: 月の錯覚)	January 6, 2013	TBA
As Mutta and the others begin their first day at JAXA, they receive a talk from Murasaki about the training they will go through to become fully fledged astronauts. Meanwhile on the Moon, Hibito and co-astronaut Damian are sent on a mission to recover a damaged space probe, struggling with the illusions the Moon plays on perception, whilst fellow astronauts Buddy Waters and Karen Jones host a television special. Whilst trying to open a compartment on their buggy, Hibito and Damian lose track of where they are going and end up driving into a crater.
40	"Heaven and Hell"; Transliteration: "Tengoku de Jigoku" (Japanese: 天国で地獄)	January 13, 2013	TBA
Hibito finds himself trapped inside the crater, separated from Damian and unable to contact Houston. As Hibito searches for Damian, he manages to find the probe they were looking for. A flare alerts Hibito to Damian's position, where he finds Damian has injured his leg and his temperature regulation system is broken, meaning he will soon freeze to death. Although Damian tells Hibito to leave him behind, Hibito instead decides to use the battery from the buggy to power the probe in order to get him out of the crater. As Hibito attempts to climb up the craterside to reach the probe, he loses his grip and falls, damaging his suit on impact.
41	"Eighty Minutes to Live"; Transliteration: "Ato Hachi Juppun no Inochi" (Japanese: あと80分の命)	January 20, 2013	2.1
As NASA discusses rescue operations for Hibito and Damian, Azuma suggests that they send remote controlled probes to assist them whilst the other astronauts wait for their buggy to be charged. Although Hibito recovers from his fall, Damian informs him that his main oxygen tank has been punctured, leaving him with just eighty minutes of oxygen remaining. Despite this, Hibito resumes his attempt to rescue Damian, managing to reach the probe and reactivate it. Meanwhile, Mutta, having just heard the news, arrives at JAXA and gives them some input based on how he feels Hibito would act, though this advice is ignored by NASA.
42	"Hibito's Choice"; Transliteration: "Hibito no Sentaku" (Japanese: 日々人の選択)	January 27, 2013	3.1
Hoshika tells Mutta that Houston will be able to tell if Hibito moved if he fires his remaining flare. Meanwhile, Hibito, who has less than twenty minutes of oxygen left, decides to use his last flare as a makeshift fireplace to provide Damian with some necessary heat. Hibito eventually reaches the top of the crater and exposes Damian to the sunlight, but becomes stressed when he can't communicate with anyone. Meanwhile, Houston learns of their location, which was at the point Mutta predicted, and learn that Hibito has less than ten minutes of oxygen remaining. After making sure Damian is properly shaded, Hibito decides to take a walk on his own, preparing to walk into the ravine again so he can see the stars once more. Just then, he spots the flash he saw earlier and decides to investigate it, discovering it to be a small astronaut figure left behind by Brian.
43	"Brian"; Transliteration: "Buraian" (Japanese: ブライアン)	February 3, 2013	TBA
Hibito reminisces about Brian, who was something of a mentor to him. Checking the back of the figure, Hibito finds a picture of a young Brian with his brother, Eddie Jay, realising Brian left the figure there so both brothers would eventually stand on the Moon together. The oxygen reserves in Hibito's suit soon runs out, putting Hibito through pain as he gasps for oxygen before almost losing consciousness. Just then, the oxygen producing drone named after Brian arrives on the scene, allowing Hibito to obtain some oxygen in the very nick of time.
44	"Three Astronauts"; Transliteration: "San Nin no Uchū Hikōshi" (Japanese: 3人の宇宙飛行士)	February 10, 2013	TBA
It is revealed that Hibito was able to be saved because of Azuma's plea to NASA to take into account Mutta's theory as the worst-case scenario and send the Brian drone over to where he suggested. Meanwhile, Mutta is relieved to hear of Hibito's safety once news reaches JAXA. Whilst the other astronauts, Freddy Saturn and Buddy Walters, bring Hibito and Damian back to base, they reminisce about all the things Brian taught them. Three days later, Mutta gets a chance to talk with Hibito, who gives him his deepest thanks for helping to save him, promising that they'll both stand on the Moon together.
45	"Five Blue Rangers"; Transliteration: "Go Nin no Ao Renjā" (Japanese: 5人の青レンジャー)	February 17, 2013	TBA
Mutta pays a visit to Sharon, who is shocked to hear how much danger Hibito was in. She reveals that her astronomy team has received funding to build a lunar telescope on the Moon, which would allow people to see further into space, an idea spurred by her late husband, Shinichi, who named an asteroid after her before he died from an illness. This spurs on Mutta to fulfil his promise to Sharon, along with his promise to Hibito. Later, Mutta and the others receive their official JAXA jumpsuits before being informed they will be travelling to Houston tomorrow to begin their joint astronaut training.
46	"Number One Restless Guy"; Transliteration: "Sekkachi Yarō Nanbā Wan" (Japanese: せっかちやろうナンバーワン)	February 24, 2013	TBA
As the astronaut candidates arrive at the airport, Serika and Ena think back to their last meals with their friends and family. Serika had dinner with her friends and grandparents whilst Ena spent time with her younger sister, Kei, helping her decide what she wants to do in the future. Meanwhile, Mutta attracts a lot of attention after Murasaki tricks him into putting on his jumpsuit in the airport. Meanwhile at NASA, astronaut Vincent Bold is assigned as the training instructor for the new trainees. Upon arriving at Houston, Mutta meets up with Ozzy, who helps him and Kenji set up accommodation in Hibito's house.
47	"The First Promise"; Transliteration: "Saisho no Yakusoku" (Japanese: 最初の約束)	March 3, 2013	TBA
Whilst Serika and Ena manage to find a place to live, Mutta becomes curious about something Murasaki allegedly mentioned to Kenji about the training during the flight. Deciding to ask Murasaki himself, he mentions how a few astronauts always seem to leave at some point during the training due to not being up to snuff. He goes on to explain the role of astronauts is akin to those of actors, stating he himself has never gotten the chance to 'stand on stage'. Later, the group go to the mission control center, where Mutta hears from Jennifer that Hibito probably won't be approved for any EVA operations for the duration of the mission. Afterwards, a party is held for all the trainee astronauts, where the group meet Amanti Patel from India, who has a hobby of reading people's fortunes. When asked to read Mutta's future, she has an unsteady feeling.
48	"Always Have a Pedometer in Your Heart"; Transliteration: "Kokoro ni Itsumo Manpokei o" (Japanese: 心にいつも万歩計を)	March 10, 2013	TBA
The astronaut candidates are briefed on their training, with Bold stating he plans to make everyone go through two years of training in a year and a half, to the surprise of his fellow instructor, Larry Bison. He starts off with the hard stuff right away by putting everyone through survival training in the desert, where they must walk all the way to Amarillo. Mutta's group, consisting of the JAXA candidates and Amanti, is led by Kenji to meet up with their advisors, Mike Davis and, to Mutta's surprise, Lowry, who provide them with lunch before informing them they'll need to forage further meals themselves.
49	"Nitta the Leader"; Transliteration: "Rīdā Nitta" (Japanese: リーダー新田)	March 17, 2013	TBA
As Mutta's team find their rations and set up camp for a night, they are informed they are currently last in the rankings, which requires one person beside the leader to take a punishment. Mutta volunteers for the punishment, in which he must stand at attention for a whole hour, but the group soon cheer up when they are treated to a beautiful view of the stars. Later on the fourth day, as Nitta is chosen as the leader, he appears to be a bit more strict with his desire to increase their ranking, whilst also expecting a call from a certain someone. Just then, Mutta pushes Nitta out of the way of their food crate when he notices a rattlesnake. Following the incident, Davis issues the leader with a handgun to defend themselves against dangerous wildlife. On the fifth day, as Mutta acts as leader and helps the group push onwards, Nitta suddenly tells the others that he must head back.
50	"Nitta and Mutta"; Transliteration: "Nitta to Mutta" (Japanese: ニッタとムッタ)	March 24, 2013	TBA
Nitta explains that he had left his phone behind somewhere, which he needs as he is expecting an important call. Nitta opts to go alone to search for it, but Mutta, being the leader, decides it would be best to search alongside him at night once they set up camp. Along the way, Nitta explains he is waiting for a call from his younger brother, Kazuya, who he hasn't spoken to in two years. Mutta suspects that Nitta may have dropped his phone near the previous food crate when Mutta tackled him, which motivates Nitta to rush to its location. Arriving at the crate, Nitta finds his phone as it flashes, only to find he had barely missed a call from Kazuya.
51	"Living Stone"; Transliteration: "Ikita Ishikoro" (Japanese: 生きた石コロ)	March 31, 2013	TBA
As Mutta and Nitta head back to camp, discussing their relationships with their respective brothers, Kazuya looks up information about the astronauts, finding a video interview with Nitta. In the video, Nitta explains how feelings that you may not belong in this world can help drive you to go beyond it, stating some of the things Kazuya taught him when they were younger. After returning to camp, Nitta explains to the others about his brother whilst Mutta once again worries about Amanti's prediction. As a starstorm flies above the desert, Kazuya starts to venture outside his own little world.

=== 2nd year ===
No.	Title	Original release date
52	"A Big Brother Should Always..."; Transliteration: "Ani to wa Tsune ni" (Japanese: 兄とは常に)	April 6, 2013
Recap episode. Mutta recalls how he first got accepted for the JAXA training program.
53	"Stand on the Moon Together Alive"; Transliteration: "Ikite Futari de Tsuki ni Tatō" (Japanese: 生きて二人で月に立とう)	April 13, 2013
Recap episode. Hibito recalls the ordeal of his accident on the Moon.
54	"Do I Have Good Luck?"; Transliteration: "Ore ni wa Un ga Aru?" (Japanese: 俺には運がある?)	April 20, 2013
Recap episode. Mutta recalls watching Hibito's launch, as well as the events of his JAXA exams.
55	"Distant Goal"; Transliteration: "Tōsugiru Gōru" (Japanese: 遠すぎるゴール)	April 27, 2013
On the final day of the survival training, Mutta winds up with a fever, putting the team in a tough decision to either continue pushing onwards or retire. As leader, Amanti understands Mutta's wishes and decides that they will keep on walking, with everyone helping to carry Mutta's belongings. As the team draw close to their goal, an automated rover lands nearby, which is revealed to be part of the next task, in which they must collaborate with an engineer and develop a CanSat rover in two weeks for a Comeback Competition. As the team in last place, Mutta's team is stuck with a lazy engineer named Pico Norton, who has no intention of helping them out. As Mutta rests up from his fever, Pico goes out drinking with Vince.
56	"Promise to Drink"; Transliteration: "Sake no Yakusoku" (Japanese: 酒の約束)	May 4, 2013
As the news reports that Hibito will soon be returning from the Moon, Pico is put under pressure as he designed the parachute that must help them land safely. After Mutta recovers from his cold, the team try to work on their project without Pico's help, being at a budget disadvantage due to ranking last. Speaking with one of Pico's co-workers, Mutta becomes more unnerved upon hearing Pico developed the parachute deployment system for Hibito's return. When Mutta brings up whether Pico's system was responsible for Brian's accident, it is explained that the head NASA engineer at the time chose another company's parachute for Brian's capsule after a human error resulted in a crash during a test of Pico's system. Hearing this, Mutta brings up to the team that they need to prepare their budget for two rovers, with the anticipation that one of them could fail.
57	"An Engineer's Switch"; Transliteration: "Gijutsusha no Suitchi" (Japanese: 技術者のスイッチ)	May 11, 2013
As Azuma makes his way towards the Moon, Mutta's team works on testing the rover, learning of what flaws they need to fix. The team consider following another team's example and going with a glider instead of a ground rover, but Pico points out that the wind would cause issues with that plan. Using his engineer insight on how to overcome their obstacles, Mutta suggests that they make the rover's tires out of sponge, so they can have larger tires that still fit inside the rocket whilst also reducing costs and providing shock absorption. Impressed by this idea, Pico decides to give the team advice on their parachute, encouraging them to think of the rover as a spaceship containing their comrades. With Mutta's ideas and Pico's advice, the team manage to put together a working rover complete with a functioning parachute. Later, as Mutta is invited by Pico for a drink, Vince takes him for a drive.
58	"Earnest Failure"; Transliteration: "Honki no Shippai" (Japanese: 本気の失敗)	May 18, 2013
During their car ride, Vince mentions that he considers astronomers his enemy, due to their supposed snobbery towards crewed spaceflight. When asked who his viewpoint, Mutta responds that he considers himself to be his worst enemy, with Sharon being the one who helped him see that. As Pico joins them at the bar, Mutta's remark about earnest failures reminds Pico and Vince about their childhood friend, Rick, who used to make rockets together. Back when they were fifteen, they were under pressure to give up on their dreams and settle with becoming coal miners due to the town they were raised in, but they reaffirmed their dreams after seeing Brian riding the ISS.
59	"Promise Sign"; Transliteration: "Chikai no Sain" (Japanese: 誓いのサイン)	May 25, 2013
Pico and Vince were pushed by their fathers and teachers to apply for their local technical college, which angered Rick, who felt betrayed by the others for giving up their dreams. Before they could make up with each other, Rick died in a car accident on the day Pico and Vince attended a career day for the mines. Distraught and angered by Rick's death, Pico and Vince reaffirmed their resolve to pursue careers as astronauts, as life is too short for unexciting things. Back in the present, Azuma and his group arrive at the Moon base, where he reunites with Hibito, who thanks him for helping to save his life, whilst Mutta, Kenji and Nitta watch it on TV. As the day of the Comeback Competition arrives, Pico informs Mutta and Kenji that a rainfall the previous night could potentially cause huge problems with the sponge tires, the worst-case scenario given them only an hour to do something about it.
60	"Sea Diver and Space Diver"; Transliteration: "Uminchu to Uchunchu" (Japanese: 海人と宇宙人)	June 1, 2013
With a limited amount of time before they launch, the team search for materials they can use to keep the sponge tires dry. Visiting the hotel's utility room, Mutta borrows some silicone sealant from the janitor, which he uses to waterproof the tires. With all their elements in place, along with Mutta's addition of a toy astronaut to represent the purpose of the experiment, the rover manages to make it 200 m from the target goal before its battery dies, ranking them fifth overall and second amongst the AsCans. After the contest, they are approach by the winning team, whose director turns out to be none other than Naoto, who is working hard to develop a Japanese crewed rocket.
61	"Those Who Wait for Hibito"; Transliteration: "Hibito o Matsu Hitobito" (Japanese: 日々人を待つ人々)	June 8, 2013
As Hibito, along with Damian and Linda, begin their journey back to Earth, Mutta's group give Pico their rover as a memento of their time together. The day soon comes for the space module Orion to enter the atmosphere and a collective sigh of relief is heard as the parachutes are successfully deployed and the three astronauts land safely. Arriving in Houston, Hibito greets Mutta, giving him a piece of rock from the Moon as a souvenir.
62	"Those Who Dream Far"; Transliteration: "Haruka Tōku o Nozomu Hito" (Japanese: 遥か遠くを望む人)	June 15, 2013
Whilst Hibito, Damian and Linda begin their rehabilitation, Amanti tells Mutta about a premonition she had about him, saying someone close to him will soon be stricken by a serious illness. Meanwhile, Sharon travels to a conference in America to propose the construction of a lunar telescope. Back in Houston, Mutta and the other AsCans are at Ellington Airport where they much learn how to pilot a T-38 jet as part of their astronaut training. Mutta is called up by Sharon who, after talking with Serika who is a big fan of hers, says she will be in Houston in two days, whilst Mutta starts to worry if she is the one Amanti mentioned.
63	"Young Excitement"; Transliteration: "Wakaki Hi no Doki Doki" (Japanese: 若き日のドキドキ)	June 22, 2013
The AsCans begin their flight studies, in which they must learn three weeks worth of flight knowledge in three days. Meanwhile, Sharon speaks with Daniel Morrison, a university lecturer from Hawaii, who expresses his interest in her telescope proposal and offers his support. She eventually arrives in Houston where she meets up with Hibito, who senses some limpness in her hands. After Sharon falls over whilst trying to carry some drinks, her assistant and Hibito check her into a medical center, where the doctor claims she is only feeling fatigue. Later that night, Hibito and Sharon head to a party Mutta and the others are holding. When Serika notices Sharon's battered cellphone, she is reminded of when her father was first diagnosed with his illness and discovers Sharon is showing the same symptoms he had.
64	"Piece of Cake"; Transliteration: "Hitokire no Kēki" (Japanese: 一切れのケーキ)	June 29, 2013
Mutta, Hibito and Serika accompany Sharon to a neurologist, where Serika fears she may be suffering from amyotrophic lateral sclerosis just like her father. As Sharon is admitted for more tests, Serika explains the details of ALS to Mutta, who is shocked to learn that it may one day kill her. As such, Mutta finds himself unable to concentrate on his written test and scores terribly. Following her examinations, in which she is properly diagnosed with ALS, Sharon is visited by Serika, who tells her about her father and motivates her to work hard on her research despite her illness. As Sharon heads back towards Japan, Mutta reaffirms his promise to help build her telescope. Later, Serika tells Mutta about a similar promise she made to get up to the ISS and develop a treatment for ALS.
65	"Wheelchair Pilot"; Transliteration: "Kuruma Isu no Pairotto" (Japanese: 車イスのパイロット)	July 13, 2013
After Mutta takes a make-up exam, this time managing to concentrate properly, he once again meets Deneil Young. With the top scoring AsCans being assigned to the best flight instructors for their T-38 training, Mutta, as the only one who had to take a make-up, is assigned to Deneil.
66	"Two Notebooks"; Transliteration: "Futatsu no Nōto" (Japanese: 二つのノート)	July 20, 2013
Deneil takes Mutta on his first T-38 flight where, unlike the other instructors, he flies at speeds of 6.5Gs. Mutta throws up on his first flight, though after hearing Hibito went through the same training, he decides to go on it again. He soon begins training to fly himself, tasked with relying on instruments instead of sight. Whilst initially having trouble, Mutta is soon encouraged by Deneil's advice and Sharon's hand written letter, encouraging him to train for what he can.
67	"Deneil-ized"; Transliteration: "Denīru-ka" (Japanese: デニール化)	July 27, 2013
Hibito informs Mutta that he'll be returning to Japan for a week in order to be debriefed by JAXA and visit Sharon. Meanwhile, Mutta struggles with multitasking aspect of flying a T-38, not helped by Deniel's improvisations and a burger commercial that got stuck in his head. After giving him some advice on being a top pilot, Deneil later tells Mutta that he plans to retire once Mutta becomes an official astronaut. Meanwhile, Hibito and the other astronauts go drinking with Pico, telling him about his experiences with Deneil. As Mutta finally gets the hang of his training, Deneil tells him about how he salutes to pictures of pilots and would-be astronauts who died in flight accidents.
68	"Two Keyboards"; Transliteration: "Futatsu no Kenban" (Japanese: 二つの鍵盤)	August 3, 2013
Hibito returns to Japan to discover that his first step on the Moon has inspired national fame and a trend of rabbit ears. With her symptoms worsening, Sharon reports that she is no longer able to play her piano. Hibito takes a break from his packed schedule of public appearances to visit Sharon, and presents her with a special light-keyed piano that she should be able to play despite her condition. Sharon is overcome with emotion as it is revealed that Mutta has also sent her the exact same gift.
69	"Next to Hibito"; Transliteration: "Hibito ni Narabu" (Japanese: 日々人に並ぶ)	August 10, 2013
The Moon mission-inspired Mr. Hibbit anime starts airing in Japan, Hibito returns to Houston, and Mutta continues through ten months of astronaut training. After Mutta's final flight with Deniel Young, as per the tradition for retiring pilots, Deneil has water thrown over him. Mutta and the rest of the AsCans graduate and become astronauts. Mutta's astronaut portrait is displayed in JAXA HQ next to Hibito's. Short Mr. Hibbit episodes air after the credits from this episode onwards.
70	"Determination to Give Up"; Transliteration: "Akirame no Yō na Kakugo" (Japanese: 諦めのような覚悟)	August 17, 2013
Having finished his training, Mutta is offered a spot on the ISS backup crew; a very rare opportunity for a new astronaut. Knowing that the Moon mission is his goal, he turns it down and recommends that it be offered to Serika instead. As a result, Mutta is assigned to work with an engineering team in charge of designing new lunar vehicles. He worries that this may be a dead end for his career as an astronaut, but Vince suggests that if Mutta is able to produce results, he may be rewarded with a spot on the Moon mission.
71	"Rehearsal"; Transliteration: "Rihāsaru" (Japanese: リハーサル)	August 31, 2013
Hibito and Mutta do a photo session together to appear on the cover of a Japanese magazine before Hibito departs for Russia. On the way, Hibito and Mutta discuss the failings of the lunar buggy on the Moon, leading Mutta to conclude that his team needs to take a different tack than simply improving the tires and brakes. While wearing costume spacesuits for the shoot, Mutta notices that Hibito looks uncomfortable. Unknown to him, Hibito has developed a panic disorder when wearing space suits.
72	"Hibito's Disorder"; Transliteration: "Hibito no Shōgai" (Japanese: 日々人の障害)	September 7, 2013
On Hibito's first return to zero-gravity training on Earth, he suffers a panic attack when lowered into the water in a space suit. Since astronauts are required to be able to perform EVAs, NASA denies him new lunar missions until he's completely recovered. Determined to do so, Hibito confides in Sharon, but asks to keep it a secret from his family and colleagues. Meanwhile, Mutta consults with Damien on how to improve the lunar buggy, and decides to leverage his old automobile industry connections for assistance.
73	"A Road on the Roadless Moon"; Transliteration: "Michi Naki Tsuki ni Michi o" (Japanese: 道なき月に道を)	September 14, 2013
Mutta comes up with a solution to the lunar buggy problem based on an idea he had while working at his old automobile company. He invites two junior colleagues to join him, with whom he previously developed a proposal for a flying car to solve the problem of traffic in Japan. While the project itself was considered too outlandish, the technology for projecting a route onto the windshield was put into development. With the company now committed to working for NASA, Mutta proposes a solution in which lunar surface data from JAXA's Kaguya II mission is used to project virtual roads onto the windshield of the lunar buggy, showing astronauts safe routes to drive.
74	"Magic Trick"; Transliteration: "Mahō no Urawaza" (Japanese: 魔法の裏技)	September 21, 2013
Chief Butler and Azuma discuss assigning Mutta to a lunar mission, and Azuma believes that Hibito would be inspired to hear of his brother beginning lunar training. However, Butler wants to be cautious—he talks about an old colleague called Ronald Cooper who developed panic disorder after a surviving a plane crash and eventually left NASA. Meanwhile, Mutta decides that he needs to impress Chief Butler—he decides to express his resolve by learning to do a vertical climb roll in his T-38, a move Butler once mentioned in an old interview as being meaningful to him, having been an Air Force pilot before becoming an astronaut. Mutta asks him to look over Ellington airport at 6:30 pm as he demonstrates the stunt.
75	"My Hands"; Transliteration: "Watashi no Ryōte" (Japanese: わたしの両手)	September 28, 2013
Having seen Mutta's vertical climb roll, Butler stops off at the airfield. At 6:33pm Mutta wants to demonstrate a second move, for the benefit of Serika—a heart in the sky. However, the shuttle bus to the airfield is late and Serika is only able to see it side-on, mistaking it for an Alien Baltan (although Ena Kitamura realises what it is). Chief Butler sees the heart and concludes with embarrassment that Mutta has a crush on him. In Japan, Sharon misses what she used to be able do with her hands—playing piano, cutting the boys' hair, teaching them to make cookies. Daniel Morrison visits, bringing promises of help for the lunar telescope from many different collaborators, and tells her that they will be her hands. With her ability to write deteriorating, Sharon begins to verbally record instructions for building the lunar telescope.
76	"Olga"; Transliteration: "Origa" (Japanese: オリガ)	October 5, 2013
Hibito begins his rehabilitation in Russia, and is invited to spend time with the family of legendary Russian astronaut Ivan Tolstoy. There he meets Olga, Ivan's 15-year-old daughter, who is secretly a big fan of the Mr. Hibbit anime and desperately tries to act mature in front of Hibito. Ivan is Hibito's mentor for his rehabilitation, and starts him out on walking a distance of 10 meters in a simple Russian pressure suit. It is enough to give Hibito flashbacks and trigger a panic attack. Hibito wants to self-isolate but Ivan insists he not be alone, inviting him for dinner with his family again. Olga notes that Hibito doesn't have the courage and energy displayed by his anime counterpart. Discouraged by his worsening condition, Hibito is in no mood to drink and leaves early, to the Tolstoys' concern.
77	"An Astronaut's Daughter"; Transliteration: "Uchū Hikōshi no Musume" (Japanese: 宇宙飛行士の娘)	October 12, 2013
After Hibito skips training for two days, Ivan invites him to go out for a drink, where he shows Hibito videos of Olga learning ballet as a child. He gives Hibito a CD of Olga aged 5-10, following her progress in learning ballet, and asks him to watch it. Hibito does so, discovering that Olga persisted through ballet lessons despite finding them difficult and lagging behind the rest of the class. The next day he joins her mother, Emilia Tolstoy, in watching a performance and is surprised to learn that despite her difficult beginnings, Olga is the star of the show.
78	"Out of Time"; Transliteration: "Jikangire" (Japanese: 時間切れ)	October 19, 2013
Olga joins Hibito after the performance to walk about the city. He tells her about coming to Russia to recover from a disorder, and promises to join her again the following week. Hibito begins training again, although Ivan refuses to show him the second part of Olga's childhood videos since Olga found out and objected to Hibito seeing them. Ivan gives Hibito a pair of sunglasses to wear, and points out that Hibito managed to successfully walk 10m in them. Gradually, Hibito progresses to more complex costumes to imitate different aspects of wearing a space suit. Back in America, however, Chief Butler is confronted by the Moonbase Program Manager Walter Gates, who reports Hibito's condition back to JAXA. It is decided that Hibito will be given the role of Safety Supervisor, taking him off active duty as an astronaut.
79	"Olga, Hibito, and Gagarin"; Transliteration: "Origa to Hibito to Gagārin" (Japanese: オリガとヒビトとガガーリン)	October 26, 2013
Hibito is recalled back to NASA in order to take up his new role. Ivan objects but is criticized by a colleague for having a personal stake in the matter, as his father suffered from panic disorder too. Ivan encourages Hibito to continue his rehabilitation in America. Upset at the news that Hibito is leaving, Olga goes to visit him and gives him the second volume of her childhood dance videos. As they part ways, Olga tells Hibito stories about Yuri Gagarin and promises to tell him what Gagarin said about the world when next they meet. Hibito resolves to recover and come back to Russia on his own terms. This is the final episode with a post-credits Mr. Hibbit episode in this arc—in which Mr. Hibbit and his crew finally make it to space.
80	"Secret"; Transliteration: "Himitsu" (Japanese: 秘密)	November 2, 2013
Vince informs Mutta that he is ready to begin lunar training. Mutta says goodbye to the lunar buggy team and joins a group of twelve astronauts in preparing for underwater NEEMO training. He is surprised by Hibito's early return from Russia, and Hibito tells him he's going to start lunar training again, not wanting to worry his brother. Mutta visits Kenji and his family before they set off for NEEMO training together. As Kenji says goodbye to Yuki, who is pregnant, and a distraught Fuuka, they reflect on his daughter growing up. Worried about how he will manage to recover by himself, Hibito receives a package from Ivan with all of the costumes they were using for training.
81	"Worst Enemy"; Transliteration: "Ichiban no Teki" (Japanese: 一番の敵)	November 9, 2013
Mutta's two weeks of NEEMO training begins, staying in a simulated lunar environment 20 meters below the ocean's surface in the Florida Keys. He scuba dives into the habitat Aquarius II, where he meets technical support diver Hamilton, and two astronauts from the class above, George Love and Andy Tyler. Mutta is pleased to be joined by Kenji, the other astronaut on his team from the 23rd class (nicknamed 'Ants'), but unknown to him, only one of the two of them will be picked for a lunar mission. Meanwhile, Hibito enlists the help of Lowry and Dr Olivia to help him in his rehabilitation in secret.
82	"Space Family"; Transliteration: "Uchū Kazoku" (Japanese: 宇宙家族)	November 16, 2013
Ena is granted a space on the ISS backup crew as robotic arm operator, to her and Serika's delight. The NEEMO astronauts are given their primary mission: to construct a 1/3 scale model of the Moonbase, and to come up with ideas for improvements. Kenji suggests adding a long-range antenna, and Mutta has the idea of rover charging stations, thinking of Hibito's accident. He also suggests building a lunar telescope, as practice for achieving Sharon's dream. Kenji reflects on his family—Fuuka is excited that her father is training to go to the Moon, but upset by his long absences. Yuki is exhausted and frustrated by raising Fuuka by herself and her difficulty speaking English. His family sacrifices a lot for him to go to space, so he is determined to do his best to get to the Moon to make their sacrifice worth it.
83	"Kenji and I"; Transliteration: "Ore to Kenji" (Japanese: 俺とケンジ)	November 23, 2013
George tells Mutta and Kenji that they are competing for a single spot on the Moon mission, to their horror. Mutta is driven by his promise to Sharon but Kenji, realising that he needs to stand out, reviews the model Moonbase design and determines that the antenna and lunar telescope are unnecessary additions. Mutta goes along with it, not wanting to conflict with Kenji. However, Mutta and Kenji's easy camaraderie is broken. Andy talks to Mutta about his stress and worry over not being assigned to a mission for a long time. Realising how powerless he was to affect the mission decisions from higher-ups, he decided not to think about what he couldn't control and to focus on working hard. Feeling more sure of himself, Mutta decides to make the case for keeping the lunar telescope.
84	"Supandaman"; Transliteration: "Sūpandaman" (Japanese: スーパンダマン)	November 30, 2013
While Mutta is enthusiastic about still building the lunar telescope, George points out that building the model Moonbase will take longer than they have time for amongst the rest of their training, and that Kenji made the right call. Unperturbed, Mutta figures out a way to save time by recruiting Andy to help him build a storage rack on the underwater rover SEV so that they can use it to transport their materials, reasoning that they wouldn't use pushcarts on the Moon anyway. Kenji thinks about 'Supandaman', a powered-up astronaut hero made up by Fuuka who can do the impossible, and is ashamed at playing devil's advocate to Mutta's ideas in order to make himself look better. Mutta tells Kenji about his conversation with Andy and his decision to focus on the present. Kenji decides to do the impossible too and stop worrying about who will be selected.
85	"On the Moon"; Transliteration: "Getsumen ni Ita" (Japanese: 月面にいた)	December 7, 2013
Feeling more positive, Kenji has an idea to simplify the design of the long range antenna, and suggests building Mutta's charging stations inside the habitat, saving the team more time. Mutta and Kenji's friendship and teamwork are restored as they focus on working well together again. Mutta learns that Sharon's lunar telescope proposal has been tabled due to design flaws, so Sharon can't offer advice for building the model, although she and Dr. Morrison are already working on a new design. Feeling that it is pointless to build something that's already been shot down, Mutta has a different idea for how to use the mirrors. As the NEEMO training concludes and the candidates return home, the observers discuss the training and note that while both Mutta and Kenji were excellent candidates, Mutta was the one astronaut who acted like he was already living on the Moon.
86	"For Tomorrow"; Transliteration: "Ashita no Tame ni" (Japanese: 明日のために)	December 14, 2013
Inspired by the low light in the habitats due to conserving energy, Mutta designs a solar mirror system to light the inside of the windowless Moonbase, in order to lift the mood of the astronauts inside the base. Impressed by Mutta's consideration of everyday life on the Moon, the observers send on the proposal for implementation in the actual Moonbase. Hibito is bored and frustrated in his safety supervisor role but his recovery is progressing, and he is recording his training for Ivan. Now able to spend forty minutes in a souvenir space suit, all he has left to master is the real pressure suit, and finally the EVA suit itself.
87	"To the Place Where I Belong"; Transliteration: "Jibun no Basho e" (Japanese: 自分の場所へ)	December 21, 2013
Hibito watches the second volume of Olga's dance lesson videos and learns that Olga injured her ankle badly aged eleven. She made a recovery but quit dancing for a while. But after seeing her father go to space and doing ballet moves for her in the weightlessness of the ISS, Olga rediscovers her love of dancing and, at twelve years old, returns to her lessons. Encouraged, Hibito clears the final stage of his rehabilitation, wearing a pressure suit, and asks Chief Butler to give him a chance to prove himself capable of being an astronaut again. Mutta returns to Houston from Florida.
88	"Pretty Dog"; Transliteration: "Puriti Doggu" (Japanese: プリティ・ドッグ)	January 4, 2014
Hibito meets Azuma when visiting Brian Jay's grave on the anniversary of his death. Reflecting on how Brian was like an older brother to both of them, Azuma encourages Hibito to confide in his real living brother. While in a taxi, Hibito has a nightmare and panic attack, and has to get out of the car. He asks Mutta to meet him at a bar, and confesses to having a panic disorder—Mutta initially mistakes the abbreviation 'P.D.' as short for the title of a cartoon, Pretty Dog, but upon realising what Hibito means, reassures him that he is capable of passing the test. He notes that the fact that Hibito had a panic attack in the taxi means that it is not specifically the spacesuit that causes the attacks, and that Hibito can trust it. And, if he should feel a panic attack coming, that he can use the initials P.D. to remind himself of his dog instead.
89	"Last Words"; Transliteration: "Saigo no Kotoba" (Japanese: 最後の言葉)	January 11, 2014
Mutta is assigned as Vincent Bold's backup for the next lunar mission, cementing him on a journey to the Moon. He is very tired on his first day, having stayed up late the previous night researching Hibito's disorder after their conversation. Kenji and Nitta, meanwhile, are assigned to zero-gravity training. While they are not yet given any details of a mission, Chief Butler assures them that they will understand why once assigned to a mission. Lowry and Dr. Olivia prep Hibito for his test to go back to active duty.
90	"A Small Note and a Big Lucky Charm"; Transliteration: "Chitchai Memo to Dekkai O Mamori" (Japanese: 小っちゃいメモとでっかいお守り)	January 18, 2014
On the day of his test, Mutta sends Hibito a novelty Pretty Dog double mirror as a lucky charm, having read that looking at oneself objectively can help with panic disorders. Hibito wears it strapped to his spacesuit arm as he descends into the water. While underwater, Hibito proceeds through a simulated mission without a panic attack. Part way through, Butler triggers a green card to test his response to an accident. Hibito receives an alert that his CO2 level is rising and copes well with the situation. Sceptical of Hibito's suitability, Gates triggers a second green card without telling Butler. Hibito receives an alert for a CO2 sensor malfunction and his heart rate rises, but with the help of Mutta's advice he manages to stave off a panic attack. A second run of short Mr. Hibbit episodes airs after the credits of some episodes from this episode onwards.
91	"How to Help Hibito"; Transliteration: "Hibito no Sukuikata" (Japanese: ヒビトの救い方)	January 25, 2014
The second green card causes Hibito's test to be extended as he heads into the airlock to reset his suit. Having heard about Hibito's test from Mutta, Hibito's old crew arrives to support him—Buddy and Linda take over communications, and Damian joins in on the EVA. Butler approves it, since in reality Hibito will always have the support of crewmates and an EVA partner. He also doesn't simply want to test Hibito, but to help him recover in the way Ronald couldn't. Working with his old crewmates reminds him of his happiest times on the Moon, and Hibito begins to enjoy himself again. After his own training, Mutta runs over to the pool in time to see his brother being congratulated by his colleagues on successfully passing his test.
92	"Lonely People"; Transliteration: "Kodoku na Karera" (Japanese: 孤独な彼ら)	February 1, 2014
Mutta meets the rest of the lunar backup crew, made up of his NEEMO crewmate Andy, along with Phillip Louis, Carlo Greco, and Betty Rainer. They begin Desert RATS training, at a simulation habitat in the north Arizona desert, alongside the prime crew. As they are introduced to the Beetle vehicle and lunar spacesuits, Mutta notices that the crew is dysfunctional and argumentative. Back in Houston, Butler explains that the crew is made up of misfits that other astronauts were reluctant to work with. Unbeknownst to him, Mutta has been assigned to the crew as a gamble to bring them together, alongside the candidate for a crew captain.
93	"In the Corner of My Heart"; Transliteration: "Kokoro no Katasumi ni" (Japanese: 心の片隅に)	February 8, 2014
Sharon and Daniel Morrison arrive in Houston to present a new proposal for the telescope—one much easier to construct and more robust than an optical telescope. With established interest from Mutta to undertake the construction, the proposal is given serious consideration. While Sharon is in Houston, Hibito lets her know that he is recovered and simply waiting to be assigned a mission. Chief Butler approaches Brian Jay's older brother, Eddie Jay, hoping to recruit him as the backup lunar crew's captain. While highly experienced with ISS missions, Eddie is reluctant to start from scratch with lunar training, believing himself to be too old to start something new. Butler gives him photographs of the astronaut figure that Brian left on the Moon, found by Hibito. Reminded of Brian's faith in him that he'd get his chance to go to the Moon, Eddie accepts the position of captain.
94	"Exciting Teamwork"; Transliteration: "Waku Waku Chīmuwāku" (Japanese: ワクワクチームワーク)	February 15, 2014
As Desert RATS training proceeds, Mutta notices that the crew is disorganised, with each member operating independently, such as doing their morning run at their own paces. Mutta attempts to unify the group, but as the newest astronaut among them, none are inclined to follow his lead. Eddie Jay arrives to lead the team, and he and Mutta quickly develop a rapport. Learning the various peculiarities of the crewmembers, Eddie begins to change up their routine to encourage them to work together.
95	"Our Future"; Transliteration: "Orera no Shōrai" (Japanese: 俺らの将来)	February 22, 2014
Betty Rainer shares about her son, Chris. Betty was married to Tuck Ravel, one of the astronauts who died in the accident that also killed Brian Jay. When Chris was born, she temporarily left the astronaut corps to raise him, but after the accident she didn't think she would go back, until Chris began to take interest in space again. While everyone else objected, she signed back up with the blessing of her son. The last stage of Desert RATS begins, in which the main and backup crews will work together. Mutta meets Pico again, who has arrived to introduce the new lunar landing module with an addition called the STITCH—a vehicle with wheeled legs that can transport the various parts of the landing module around, allowing them to keep the Moon landing area clear. Amused at the make-up of the backup crew, he nicknames them the 'Jokers'.
96	"Astronaut and Father"; Transliteration: "Uchū Hikōshi de Ari Chichi de Ari" (Japanese: 宇宙飛行士であり父であり)	March 1, 2014
Kenji and Nitta continue their training, despite having no clear objective. With the long hours keeping him away from his family a lot, Kenji feels like he isn't doing a good job of being either an astronaut or a father. A Christmas barndance is held in Houston—Mutta goes dancing with Serika and Ena, Hibito plays guitar in the band, and while Kenji and Nitta sit out the festivities due to being so busy, Chief Butler takes them aside and tells them that they have been assigned to a mission—the first crewed mission to an asteroid. Soon after, Kenji and Yuki's second daughter is born and they name her An, from a suggestion from Fuuka and the name of the asteroid that Kenji will visit.
97	"Won't Go Away"; Transliteration: "Kienainda" (Japanese: 消えないんだ)	March 8, 2014
Mutta and Hibito's parents visit for New Year, and Hibito confides in Mutta that he's not sure that he'll be able to return to the Moon, having not yet been assigned to a new mission. Despite his recovery, his reputation has been damaged. Serika and Mutta begin CAPCOM training for their respective missions, to Mutta's delight. Chief Butler tries to persuade Walter Gates to assign Hibito to a new mission, but Gates believes him to be too risky a choice. Distaught to have failed him, Butler breaks the news to Hibito, who is unsurprised to discover it. Without telling anyone, Hibito leaves Houston and disappears.
98	"The Ultimate Astronaut"; Transliteration: "Saikyō no Uchū Hikōshi" (Japanese: 最強の宇宙飛行士)	March 15, 2014
Mutta is not doing well in CAPCOM training—he and Vince are not gelling well, and he is struggling to keep focused in the days since Hibito's disappearance. Hibito hasn't contacted anyone and is not replying to messages. Worried that he hasn't shown up at work, Butler calls Mutta about his brother. He tells him about a petition to reinstate Hibito from a number of senior astronauts, which was not enough to change Gates' mind, and warns Mutta from trying to interfere and risking his own position. Worried and distracted, Mutta makes a serious error in CAPCOM communication. The final Mr. Hibbit episode airs after the credits.
99	"Life Changes, Promises Don't"; Transliteration: "Jinsei Kahen, Yakusoku Fuhen" (Japanese: 人生可変、約束不変)	March 22, 2014
Pico overhears Vincent dressing down Mutta for his failure. Vince wants Mutta to be on the same wavelength as him, and Pico points out that they have things in common, suggesting that they talk to each other outside of training. Nitta tells Mutta that his younger brother Kazuya has started going outside, and has applied for a space industry job. While he was overridden due to his previously being a shut-in, instead he's learning English and planning to join Nitta in Houston. Mutta gets a message from Hibito. He has decided to leave NASA, but is not giving up on being an astronaut. Butler and Hoshika meet up to discuss Hibito's next step—going to Russia to train as a cosmonaut. Vince introduces Mutta to his family, and Mutta begins to figure him out. Six months later, with Mutta as CAPCOM, Vince and his crew successfully launch, bound for the Moon.

== Music listing ==
Sixteen pieces of theme music were used; eight opening themes and eight ending themes.

Space Brothers Opening and Ending Themes
First Episode	Last Episode	Opening Theme	Ending Theme
1	13	"Feel So Moon" by Unicorn	"Subarashiki Sekai" by Rake (素晴らしき世界, lit. "This Wonderful World")
14	26	"Eureka" by Sukima Switch (ユリーカ, Yurīka)	"Kokuhaku" by Angela Aki (告白, lit. "Confession")
27	38	"Yumemiro Sekai" by DOES (夢見る世界, lit. "Dream-like World")	"Tete" by Akihisa Kondō (テテ)
39	51	"Small World" by Fuji Fabric	"Goodbye Issac" by Motohiro Hata (グッバイ・アイザック, Gubbai Aizakku)
52	64	"Kienai E" by Magokoro Brothers (消えない絵, lit. "Non-Disappearing Drawing")	"Beyond" by Miho Fukuhara
65	75	"Crater" by Merengue (クレーター, Kurētā)	"Yozora no Taiyō" by Flower Companyz (夜空の太陽, lit. Sun in the Night Sky)
76	87	"HALO" by Tacica	"New World" by Kasarinchu
88	99	"B.B" by Yatou	"Anata ga Ireba OK!" by Serena (あなたがいればOK!)
