= Snowboarding in Argentina =

Studio album by Swayzak
- Released: March 1998
- Genres: Minimal techno, tech house
- Labels: Pagan Records (UK); The Medicine Label (U.S.)

Swayzak chronology
Snowboarding in Argentina (1998)	Himawari (2000)

Professional ratings
Review scores
Source	Rating
Allmusic	4/5 stars

Snowboarding in Argentina is the debut album from electronic music group Swayzak. Named for the group's dream vacation destination if the album was prosperous, Snowboarding in Argentina represents Swayzak's clean, minimalistic blend of dub, jazz-house and ambient. The album features tracks from the group's previously released singles as well as new additions. "Bueno," "Fukumachi" and "Low-Rez Skyline" are all representative of the band's danceable downtempo music.

== Track listing ==
1. "Speedboat" – 8:51
2. "Burma Heights" – 6:52
3. "Blocks" – 6:52
4. "Low-Rez Skyline" – 9:41
5. "Fukumachi" – 9:26
6. "French Dub" – 3:40
7. "Skin Diving" – 7:37
8. "Cone" – 8:03
9. "Bueno" – 14:23
