= Stewart Lupton =

American musician

Stewart Lupton (March 29, 1975 – May 29, 2018) was an American musician who was the lead singer of New York indie band Jonathan Fire*Eater and The Childballads.

== Biography ==
Stewart Lupton was born in Winston-Salem, North Carolina, on March 29, 1975. His father was in the United States Army. His family moved from North Carolina to Washington, D.C., when he was in fourth grade. He attended St. Albans School in Washington, as well as George Washington University where he studied poetry.

He died at the age 43 on May 29, 2018, in Salt Lake City.
