= The Childballads =

American indie rock project

The Childballads was an indie rock project led by singer, lyricist, and poet Stewart Lupton, best known as the former lead singer of Jonathan Fire*Eater.

After the breakup of Jonathan Fire*Eater, Lupton studied poetry at George Washington University—concentrating mainly on the High Middle Ages and Modernism—reconnecting with his early passion for literature.The band name derived from the Child Ballads, a collection of 305 ballads from Scotland and England put together by Francis James Child in the late 19th century.

The Childballads' sound was reminiscent of Royal Trux—a band that Lupton cites as an influence—and their musical performances are interspersed with recitations of poetry. For example, in a solo gig at the Luna Lounge, Lupton read from John Ashbery. Traces of Ashbery can be found in Lupton's poetry and lyrics, as can be elements of Eliot and Dante. Similarly, in 2007, Lupton read from, and sang about, Lord Byron.

The project toured Paris and London and was an opening act for Cat Power.

Stewart Lupton died on May 28, 2018, at the age of 43.

== Discography ==
- Cheekbone Hollows EP (Gypsy Eyes Records, 2006)
