= Swayzak =

British tech house duo

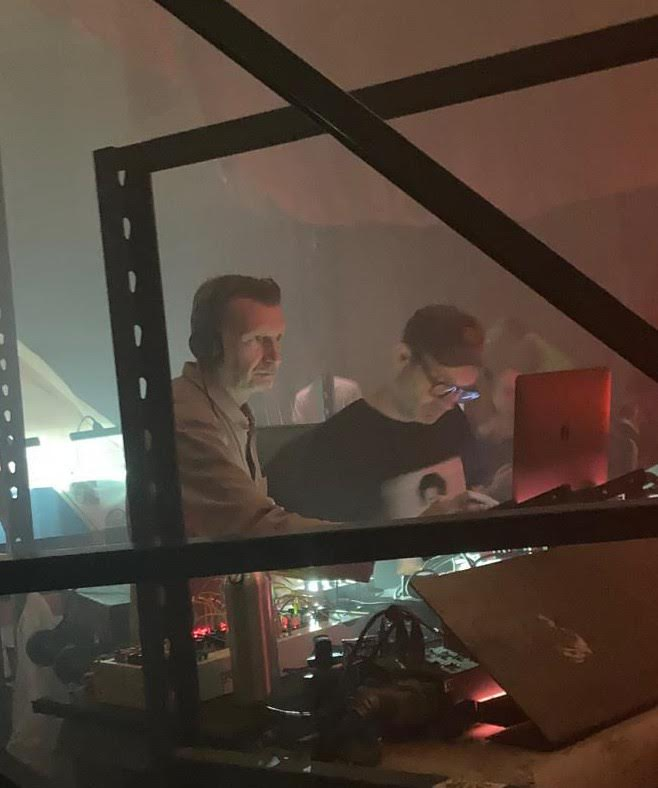
- Swayzak concert in Belgium

Background information
- Origin: London, England
- Genres: Minimal techno, tech house
- Years active: 1993–present
- Labels: !K7; Fabric; Medicine; Pagan; Swayzak Recordings
- Members: David Brown, James S. Taylor

Swayzak are a tech house duo from the United Kingdom that consist of James S. Taylor and David Brown. They released their first 12" single "Bueno" / "Fukumachi" in February 1997 to much acclaim. It was followed up by the 12" "Speedboat" / "Low Rez Skyline" to become part of the burgeoning tech-house scene in the UK.

Their debut album, Snowboarding in Argentina was released by The Medicine Label (US) and Pagan Records (UK) in May 1998. It garnered many positive reviews. The album was later chosen as 1998 Album of the Year in the U.S. dance publication Mixer. They went on to release four further studio albums.

James Taylor left the group in 2011 to focus on his solo project Lugano Fell. David Brown continues to release music and play live as s_w_z_k. Taylor and Brown regrouped as Swayzak in 2023.

== Discography ==
=== Albums ===
- Snowboarding in Argentina (1998, Pagan)
- Himawari (2000, Medicine)
- Dirty Dancing (2002, !K7)
- Loops from the Bergerie (2004, !K7)
- Some Other Country (2007, !K7)
- s_w_z_k (2012, Tresor)

=== Compilations and DJ mixes ===
- Snooploops and Sneakbeats Volume 1 (1999, Swayzak Recordings)
- Two Hundred and Forty Volts Volume 1 (1999, Swayzak Recordings)
- Snooploops and Sneakbeats Volume 2 (2000, Swayzak Recordings)
- Two Hundred and Forty Volts Volume 2 (2000, Swayzak Recordings)
- Groovetechnology, Vol. 1.3 (2001, !K7)
- Fabric 11 (2003, Fabric)
- Route de la Slack (2006, !K7)
- Avantgarde // Swayzak Presents Serieculture (2006, Avantgarde)
