= Miho Fukuhara discography =

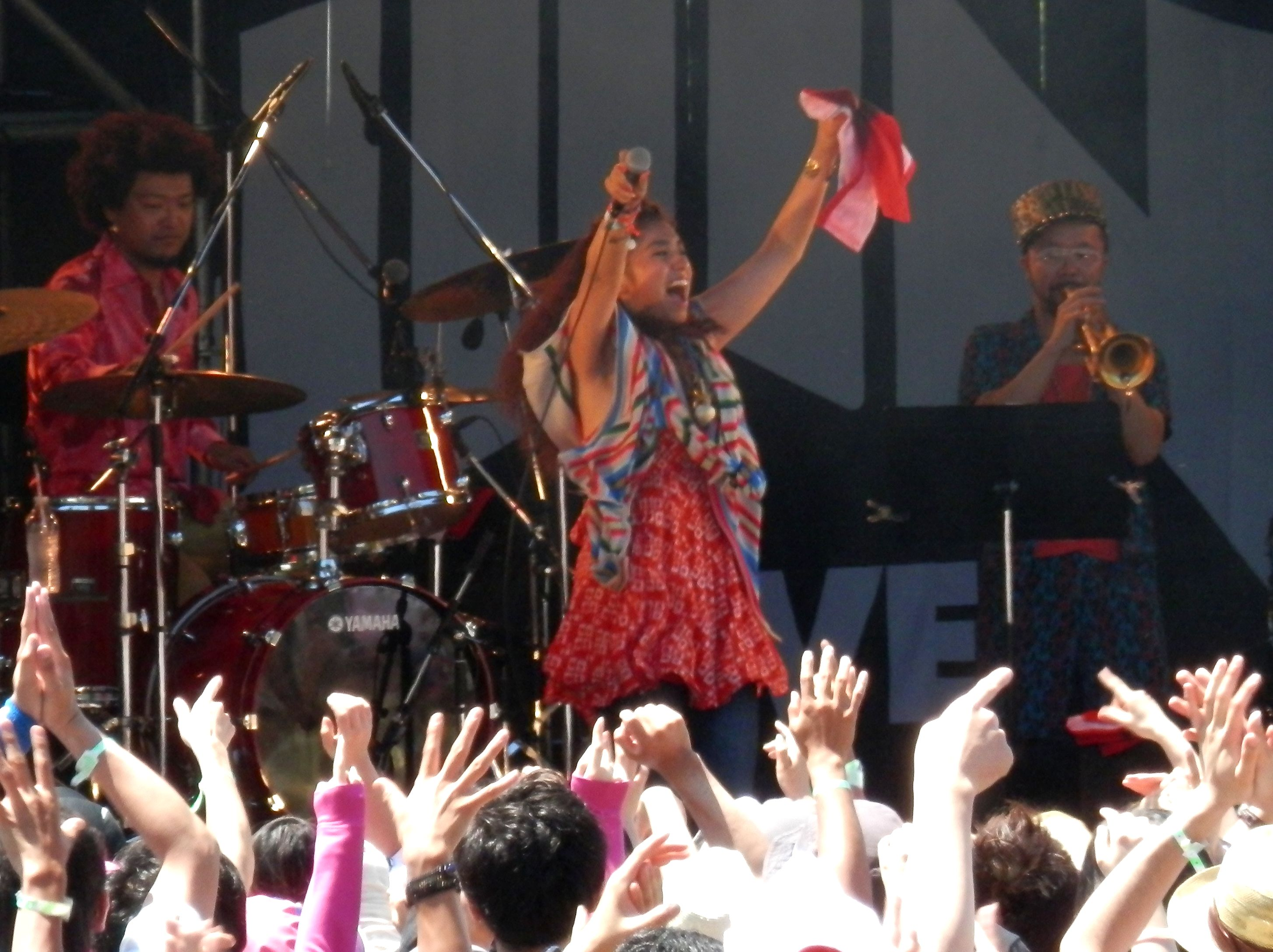
- Miho Fukuhara performing in Hokkaido in 2013
- Studio albums: 3
- EPs: 6
- Live albums: 1
- Compilation albums: 1
- Singles: 13
- Video albums: 1

The discography of Japanese musician Miho Fukuhara consists of three studio albums, six extended plays, five video albums and numerous singles. Fukuhara debuted as a singer in 2006 locally in Hokkaido, releasing The Roots and Step Up EP through Hokkaido Television Broadcasting's independent label Yumechika Records. After covering Celine Dion's "Because You Loved Me" in 2007, Fukuhara made her major label debut through Sony Music Japan in 2008.

Fukuhara's debut album Rainbow (2008) was a commercial success, becoming certified gold by the RIAJ and spawning the top 30 singles "Change", "Himawari", "Yasashii Aka" and "Love (Winter Song)". After releasing her second album Music Is My Life in 2010, Fukuhara released the concept extended plays Regrets of Love and The Soul Extreme EP. The leading track of The Soul Extreme EP, "O2" featuring singer Ai was a success, allowing Fukuhara to release a second extended play in the series, The Soul Extreme EP II, led by the song "Get Up!" featuring Akiko Wada.

In 2012, Fukuhara debuted as an actress in the musical comedy drama Kaeru no Ojōsama, and performed cover songs for the song's soundtrack. In 2013, Fukuhara was announced as the 6th vocalist for pop group Sweetbox, and was the group's featured vocalist for their album #Z21. In 2015, Fukuhara set up an independent music label, Happy Field Records, and in December of the same year released an extended play of new material, Something New.

== Studio albums ==
List of albums, with selected chart positions
Title	Album details	Peak positions		Sales (JPN) (Note: Sales provided by Oricon database and are rounded to the nearest thousand copies.)	Certifications
Title	Album details	JPN	TWN East Asian	Sales (JPN)	Certifications
Rainbow	Released: January 28, 2009 (JPN); Label: Sony Music Japan; Formats: CD, CD/DVD, digital download	2	—	93,000	RIAJ: Gold
Music Is My Life	Released: June 16, 2010 (JPN); Label: Sony; Formats: CD, CD/DVD, digital download	5	18	26,000	
The Best of Soul Extreme	Released: June 13, 2012 (JPN); Label: Sony; Formats: CD, 2CD/DVD, digital download	16	—	14,000	

== Compilation albums ==
List of albums, with selected chart positions
Title	Album details	Peak positions	Sales (JPN)
Title	Album details	JPN	Sales (JPN)
A Gift for You	Released: March 26, 2014 (JPN); Label: Sony; Formats: 2CD, digital download	60	4,000

== Live albums ==
List of albums, with selected chart positions
Title	Album details	Peak positions	Sales (JPN)
Title	Album details	JPN	Sales (JPN)
Miho Fukuhara Live in Music	Released: December 30, 2015 (JPN); Label: Happy Field Records; Formats: CD, digital download	234	300
Miho Fukuhara Symphonic Concert 2016	Released: December 1, 2016 (JPN); Label: Happy Field Records; Formats: Digital download	—	
"—" denotes items that did not chart.

== Extended plays ==
List of extended plays, with selected chart positions
Title	Album details	Peak positions	Sales (JPN)
Title	Album details	JPN	Sales (JPN)
The Roots	Released: May 24, 2006 (JPN); Label: Yumechika Records; Formats: CD	102 (Note: Charted in 2008.)	800
Step Out EP	Released: October 11, 2006 (JPN); Label: Yumechika; Formats: CD	249	800
Regrets of Love	Released: October 22, 2010 (JPN); Label: Sony; Formats: CD, 2CD, digital download	47	6,000
The Soul Extreme EP	Released: May 11, 2011 (JPN); Label: Sony; Formats: CD, 2CD, digital download	22	10,000
The Soul Extreme EP II	Released: October 12, 2011 (JPN); Label: Sony; Formats: CD, CD/DVD, digital download	26	4,000
Something New	Released: December 2, 2015 (JPN); Label: Happy Field Records; Formats: CD, CD/DVD, digital download	127	900
Love Don't Come Easy	Released: July 13, 2019 (JPN); Label: Upopo Records; Formats: CD, digital download, streaming	—	
"—" denotes items that did not chart.

== Singles ==
=== As lead artist ===
List of singles, with selected chart positions
Title	Year	Peak chart positions		Sales (JPN)	Certifications	Album
Title	Year	JPN Oricon	JPN Hot 100 (Note: Sources for chart positions are as follows: "Change", "Himawari", "Yasashii Aka", "Love (Winter Song)", "Yuki no Hikari", "Hanabi Sky", "Let It Out", "Nande Nakitaku Nacchau n Darō", "Mirai", "Get Up!", "Dream On", "Rising Heart".)	Sales (JPN)	Certifications	Album
"Change"	2008	14	4	25,000		Rainbow
"Himawari" (ひまわり; "Sunflower")	2008	24	15	9,000		Rainbow
"Yasashii Aka" (優しい赤; "Tender Red")	2008	24	11	15,000	RIAJ (cellphone): Gold	Rainbow
"Love (Winter Song)"	2008	14	10	21,000	RIAJ (cellphone): Gold	Rainbow
"Yuki no Hikari" (雪の光; "Snow Light")	2009	—	50			Rainbow
"Hanabi Sky" ("Fireworks Sky")	2009	26	5	6,000		Music Is My Life
"Let It Out"	2009	10	14	14,000		Music Is My Life
"Nande Nakitaku Nacchau n Darō" (なんで泣きたくなっちゃうんだろう; "Why Did You Want to Start Bawling?")	2009	44	44	4,000		Music Is My Life
"Mirai" (未来-ミライ-; "Future")	2010	33	41	3,000		Music Is My Life
"Moshikashite" (もしかして; "Perhaps")	2010	33	—	3,000		Music Is My Life
"Dream On" (featuring Daichi Miura)	2012	31	28	3,000		The Best of Soul Extreme
"Rising Heart" (ライジングハート, Raijingu Hāto)	2013	40	26	5,000		A Gift for You
"Beyond"	2013	40	—	5,000		A Gift for You
"Grace"	2017	128	—			Non-album single
"Joy"	2018	—	—			Love Don't Come Easy
"Ashes" (Miho Fukuhara & Charlie Lim)	2020	—	—			Non-album single
"—" denotes items that did not chart.

=== As featured artist ===
List of singles, with selected chart positions
Title	Year	Peak chart positions	Album
Title	Year	JPN Oricon	Album
"Brand New Start" (Studio Apartment featuring Miho Fukuhara)	2010	—	2010
"Watashi-tachi no Michi" (私たちの道; "Our Path") (among One Hokkaido Project)	2018	89	Non-album single
"—" denotes items that did not chart.

=== Promotional singles ===
List of promotional singles with selected chart positions
Title	Year	Peak chart positions		Album
Title	Year	JPN Hot 100	JPN RIAJ Digital Track Chart (Note: The RIAJ Digital Track Chart is a depreciated chart that ran from 2009 until early 2012 and tracked full-length cellphone downloads.) (Note: Sources for chart positions are as follows: "O2".)	Album
"Sir Duke"	2006	—N/a	—N/a	The Roots
"Koi wa Rhythm (Believe My Way) (恋はリズム; "Love Is the Rhythm")	2006	—N/a	—N/a	Step Up EP
"Regrets of Love"	2010	—	—	Regrets of Love
"Starlight"	2011	—	—	The Soul Extreme EP
"O2" (featuring Ai)	2011	—	4	The Soul Extreme EP
"Get Up!" (featuring Akiko Wada)	2011	67	—	The Soul Extreme EP II
"Surely Someday"	2010	—	—	"Rising Heart" / "Beyond" (single)
"Something New"	2015	—	—N/a	Something New
"—" denotes items that did not chart. "N/A" denotes songs that were released prior or after the creation or dissolution of the Billboard Japan Hot 100 or the RIAJ Digital Track Chart.

== Other appearances ==
List of guest appearances that feature Miho Fukuhara
Title	Year	Album
"Because You Loved Me"	2007	Tribute to Celine Dion
"Brand New Start" (Studio Apartment featuring Miho Fukuhara)	2010	2010
"Your Story" (Joe Hisaishi x Miho Fukuhara)	2010	Villain Soundtrack
"Your Story (Vocalise)" (Joe Hisaishi x Miho Fukuhara)	2010	Villain Soundtrack
"Apologies @Tokyo Za Koenji 100623" (Sleepy.ab featuring Miho Fukuhara)	2010	Live @ Sapporo Kitara
"Love Me Tender" (Elvis Presley featuring Miho Fukuhara)	2010	Viva Elvis (Japanese Edition)
"Sunao" (素直; "Truthful")	2011	We Love Mackey
"Stand by Me" (among Playing for Change)	2011	Songs Around the World: PFC with TFC
"Don't Worry" (among Playing for Change)	2011	Songs Around the World: PFC with TFC
"Chanda Mama" (among Playing for Change)	2011	Songs Around the World: PFC with TFC
"On the Way" (オン ザ ウェイ, On Za Uei) (Studio Apartment featuring Miho Fukuhara)	2012	Nihon no Uta
"On the Way (English Version)" (Studio Apartment featuring Miho Fukuhara)	2012	Nihon no Uta
"Kaze ni Naritai" (風になりたい; "I Want to Be the Wind") (among Chansons)	2012	Kaeru no Ojōsama Episode 1
"Hana" (花; "Flower") (among Chansons)	2012	Kaeru no Ojōsama Episode 1
"Cherry Blossom" (チェリーブラッサム) (among Chansons)	2012	Kaeru no Ojōsama Episode 2
"Roman Hikō" (浪漫飛行; "Romantic Flight") (among Chansons)	2012	Kaeru no Ojōsama Episode 2
"Hageshii Ame ga" (激しい雨が) (among Chansons)	2012	Kaeru no Ojōsama Episode 3
"Friends" (フレンズ) (Note: Performed solo by Fukuhara, so was unable to be released by Pony Canyon.)	2012	Kaeru no Ojōsama Episode 3
"Owaranai Uta" (終わらない歌) (among Chansons)	2012	Kaeru no Ojōsama Episode 3
"Rock 'n' Roll Widow" (ロックンロール・ウィドウ) (among Chansons)	2012	Kaeru no Ojōsama Episode 4
"Playback Part 2~Imitation Gold (Medley)" (プレイバックPart2～イミテイション・ゴールド（メドレー）) (among Chansons)	2012	Kaeru no Ojōsama Episode 4
"Cutie Honey" (キューティーハニー) (among Chansons)	2012	Kaeru no Ojōsama Episode 5
"EZ Do Dance" (among Chansons)	2012	Kaeru no Ojōsama Episode 5
"Try Me (Watashi o Shinjite)" (私を信じて) (among Chansons)	2012	Kaeru no Ojōsama Episode 5
"Flashdance... What a Feeling"	2012	Kaeru no Ojōsama Episode 5
"Sore ga Daiji" (それが大事) (among Chansons)	2012	Kaeru no Ojōsama Episode 6
"Nando demo" (何度でも) (among Chansons)	2012	Kaeru no Ojōsama Episode 6
"Wedding Bells" (ウェディング・ベル) (among Chansons)	2012	Kaeru no Ojōsama Episode 7
"Down Town" (among Chansons)	2012	Kaeru no Ojōsama Episode 7
"Tokio" (among Chansons)	2012	Kaeru no Ojōsama Episode 7
"Don't Stop the Music" (among Chansons)	2012	Kaeru no Ojōsama Episode 8
"Toki ni wa Mukashi no Hanashi o" (時には昔の話を) (among Chansons)	2012	Kaeru no Ojōsama Episode 9
"Tashika na Koto" (たしかなこと) (among Chansons)	2012	Kaeru no Ojōsama Episode 9
"Donna Toki mo." (どんなときも。) (among Chansons)	2012	Kaeru no Ojōsama Episode 10
"Happiness" (ハピネス) (among Chansons)	2012	Kaeru no Ojōsama Episode 10
"Yah Yah Yah" (among Chansons)	2012	Kaeru no Ojōsama Episode 11
"Hello, My Friend" (among Chansons)	2012	Kaeru no Ojōsama Episode 11
"#Z21 (Zeitgeist21)" (among Sweetbox)	2013	#Z21
"Nothing Can Keep Me from You" (among Sweetbox)	2013	#Z21
"All 4 Love (Skyfall)" (among Sweetbox)	2013	#Z21
"Every Rose" (among Sweetbox)	2013	#Z21
"Beautiful" (among Sweetbox)	2013	#Z21
"Life Is Good" (among Sweetbox)	2013	#Z21
"Alone" (among Sweetbox)	2013	#Z21
"Aase's Death" (among Sweetbox)	2013	#Z21
"Carol of the Bells" (among Sweetbox)	2013	#Z21
"My Understatement" (among Sweetbox)	2013	#Z21
"Justified" (among Sweetbox)	2013	#Z21
"Bon Bon Villa" (Soil & "Pimp" Sessions featuring Miho Fukuhara)	2013	Circles
"Paradise Soul" (Makoto Saito featuring Miho Fukuhara)	2013	Paradise Soul
"Exit" (Zeebra featuring Miho Fukuhara)	2013	25 to Life
"Party!!" (A Flood of Circle featuring Miho Fukuhara)	2013	Golden Time
"Every Breath You Take" (Fried Pride featuring Miho Fukuhara)	2013	Rocks!

== Video releases ==
List of media, with selected chart positions
Title	Album details	Peak positions
Title	Album details	JPN DVD
Sing a Song Tour 2010	Released: December 22, 2010; Label: Sony; Formats: DVD	183
