= Tremble Under Boom Lights =

EP by Jonathan Fire*Eater
- Released: April 23, 1996
- Genre: Rock
- Length: 21:56
- Label: Medicine
- Producer: John Siket

Jonathan Fire*Eater chronology
Jonathan Fire*Eater (1995)	Tremble Under Boom Lights (1996)	When the Curtain Calls You (1997)

Professional ratings
Review scores
Source	Rating
Allmusic	4/5 stars
Robert Christgau	(neither)
NME	8/10
Pitchfork Media	8.0/10 (reissue)

Tremble Under Boom Lights is an EP by Jonathan Fire*Eater, released in 1996. It was the first release on The Medicine Label after it split from Giant Records the previous fall. The EP was distributed by the Alternative Distribution Alliance. The five songs on the EP were written while the band's members were living in a farmhouse in Ithaca, New York.

In 2019, the release was reissued along with bonus tracks from their 1995 single self-titled single (also referred to by its first track, "The Public Hanging of a Movie Star") as well as a cover of "The City Never Sleeps" and the previously unreleased track "In the Head".

== Track listing ==
Original release
No.	Title	Length
1.	"The Search for Cherry Red"	4:36
2.	"Make It Precious"	4:43
3.	"Give Me Daughters"	4:10
4.	"The Beautician"	3:46
5.	"Winston Plum: Undertaker"	4:41

2019 reissue bonus tracks
No.	Title	Length
6.	"The Public Hanging of a Movie Star"	3:36
7.	"The Cakewalk of Crime"	3:37
8.	"When Prince Was a Kid"	3:19
9.	"The City Never Sleeps"	3:37
10.	"In the Head"	3:58
