= Himawari (album) =

Studio album by Swayzak
- Released: 11 July 2000
- Genre: Minimal techno, tech house
- Label: Sanctuary

Swayzak chronology
Snowboarding in Argentina (1998)	Himawari (2000)	Groovetechnology, Vol. 1.3 (2001)

Himawari is the second studio album by the group Swayzak, released on 11 July 2000.

== Track listing ==
1. "Illegal" - 4:14
2. "Kensal Rising" - 4:23
3. "State of Grace" - 4:54
4. "Leisure Centre" - 5:30
5. "Mysterons" - 4:32
6. "Doobie" - 7:29
7. "Caught In This Affair" - 5:13
8. "Japan Air" - 7:57
9. "Pineapple Spongecake" - 5:08
10. "The Frozen Loch" - 5:41
11. "Floyd" - 7:13
12. "Betek" - 9:12
