= Neurosis discography =

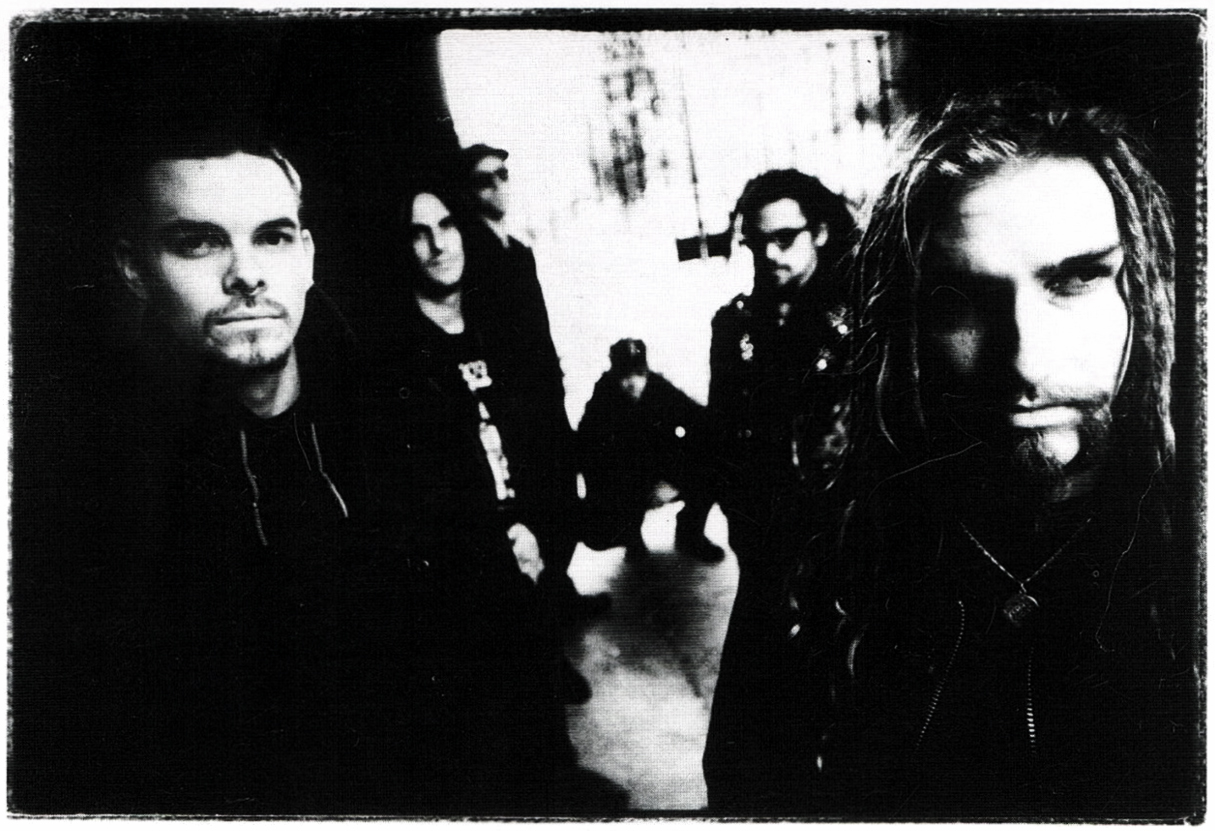
- Studio albums: 11
- EPs: 1
- Live albums: 3
- Singles: 5
- Video albums: 1
- Music videos: 7
- Splits: 2
- Collaborative albums: 1

The following is a comprehensive discography of Neurosis, a Californian post-metal band.

== Albums ==
=== Studio albums ===
Year	Album details	Chart positions				
Year	Album details	US Hard	US Heat	US Rock	US Taste	AUS
1987	Pain of Mind: Released: December 1987; Label: Alchemy Records; Format: LP	—	—	—	—	—
1990	The Word as Law: Released: February 1990; Label: Lookout! Records; Format: CD, LP	—	—	—	—	—
1992	Souls at Zero: Released: May 19, 1992; Label: Alternative Tentacles; Format: CD, LP	—	—	—	—	—
1993	Enemy of the Sun: Released: August 17, 1993; Label: Alternative Tentacles; Format: CD, LP	—	—	—	—	—
1996	Through Silver in Blood: Released: April 23, 1996; Label: Relapse Records; Format: CD, LP	—	—	—	—	—
1999	Times of Grace: Released: May 4, 1999; Label: Relapse Records; Format: CD, LP	—	—	—	—	—
2001	A Sun That Never Sets: Released: August 7, 2001; Label: Relapse Records; Format: CD, LP	—	—	—	—	—
2003	Neurosis & Jarboe (with Jarboe): Released: October 21, 2003; Label: Neurot Recordings; Format: CD, 2×LP	—	—	—	—	—
2004	The Eye of Every Storm: Released: June 28, 2004; Label: Neurot Recordings; Format: CD, LP	—	—	—	—	—
2007	Given to the Rising: Released: May 8, 2007; Label: Neurot Recordings; Format: CD, LP	—	31	—	—	—
2012	Honor Found in Decay: Released: October 30, 2012; Label: Neurot Recordings; Format: CD, LP	23	10	—	19	—
2016	Fires Within Fires: Released: September 23, 2016; Label: Neurot Recordings; Format: CD, LP	12	8	39	21	—
2026	An Undying Love for a Burning World: Released: March 20, 2026; Label: Neurot Recordings; Format: CD, LP	—	—	—	—	52
"—" denotes a release that did not chart.

=== Live albums ===
Year	Album details
2000	Short Wave Warfare: Released: 2000; Label: Neurot Recordings; Format: CD
2002	Enemy Live NYC '94: Released: 2002; Label: Neurot Recordings; Format: CD
2002	Official Bootleg.01.Lyon.France.11.02.99: Released: September 17, 2002; Label: Neurot Recordings; Format: CD
2003	Official Bootleg.02.Stockholm.Sweden.10.15.99: Released: September 23, 2003; Label: Neurot Recordings; Format: CD
2010	Live at Roadburn 2007: Released: August 30, 2010; Label: Roadburn Records; Format: CD, vinyl

=== Video albums ===
Year	Album details
2002	A Sun That Never Sets: Released: November 12, 2002; Label: Relapse Records; Format: DVD

== Extended plays ==
Year	Album details
1989	Aberration: Released: January 1989; Label: Lookout! Records; Format: 7"
1990	Empty: Released: June 1990; Label: Allied Recordings; Format: live 7"
2000	Sovereign: Released: October 31, 2000; Label: Neurot Recordings; Format: CD
2001	A Sun That Never Sets (Advance Radio Edits): Released: 2001; Label: Relapse Records; Format: Promo CD

== Split releases ==
Year	Album details
1996	Locust Star: With: Tribes of Neurot; Released: 1996; Label: Relapse Records; Format: CD
1999	In These Black Days, Volume 6: With: Soilent Green; Released: 1999; Label: Hydra Head Records; Format: vinyl

== Demos ==
Year	Album details
1986	Demo: Released: July 1986; Label: Self-released; Format: Cassette

== Singles and music videos ==
Title	Album	Year	Format
"Locust Star"	Through Silver in Blood	1996	EP
"Under the Surface" / "Children of the Grave"	Times of Grace	1998	Promotional singles
"The Doorway" / "Under the Surface"	Times of Grace	1999	Promotional singles
"Times of Grace" / "The Last You'll Know"	Times of Grace	1999	Promotional singles
"Erode"	A Sun That Never Sets	2001	Music videos
"The Tide"	A Sun That Never Sets	2001	Music videos
"From the Hill"	A Sun That Never Sets	2001	Music videos
"A Sun That Never Sets"	A Sun That Never Sets	2001	Music videos
"Falling Unknown"	A Sun That Never Sets	2001	Music videos
"From Where Its Roots Run"	A Sun That Never Sets	2001	Music videos
"Crawl Back In"	A Sun That Never Sets	2001	Music videos
"Watchfire"	A Sun That Never Sets	2001	Music videos
"Resound"	A Sun That Never Sets	2001	Music videos
"Stones from the Sky"	A Sun That Never Sets	2001	Music videos
"Locust Star (1995 Demo)"	Through Silver in Blood	2016	Flexi disc
“We Are Torn Wide Open” and “Mirror Deep“	An Undying Love for A Burning World	2026	Music Video
