= Locust Star =

EP (split) by Neurosis & Tribes of Neurot
- Released: 1996
- Recorded: 1994–1995
- Studios: Brilliant Studios, Coast Studios, and Aurora House in Oakland, California
- Genres: Post-metal; dark ambient
- Length: 47:04
- Label: Relapse Records
- Producer: Neurosis

Neurosis chronology
Through Silver in Blood (1996)	Locust Star (1996)	Times of Grace (1999)

Tribes of Neurot chronology
Silver Blood Transmission (1995)	Locust Star (1996)	Static Migration (1998)

"Locust Star"

Locust Star is a split EP between Oakland bands Neurosis and Tribes of Neurot released in 1996 through Relapse Records as a CD and a promo. Unlike most split releases, both groups involved with this EP are composed of the same members.

== Content ==
The first half of Locust Star is performed by Neurosis, while the second half features more experimental dark ambient music by Tribes of Neurot (a side project which includes members of Neurosis, with occasional other collaborators). The Tribes of Neurot releases are intended as companion pieces to Neurosis albums, and meant to be played simultaneously. In 1995, Tribes of Neurot released Silver Blood Transmission, and in 1996, Neurosis released Through Silver in Blood. Locust Star acts as a sort of bridge between the two, featuring songs from both.

=== The song ===
"Locust Star" is a track originally from Through Silver in Blood. This split includes a shortened edit of the song that was distributed to radio stations as a promotional. Musically, "Locust Star" is an aggressive post-metal song that has since been recognized as one of Neurosis's signature tracks.

A music video for "Locust Star" directed by Neurosis and Andrei Rozen was released in 1996. The video depicts a weary man wandering through a wasteland, assaulted by visions.

=== The EP ===
Locust Star is composed of four tracks from Through Silver in Blood, three of which are new shortened edits, and three tracks by Tribes of Neurot, one of which appeared on their 1995 album Silver Blood Transmission. The closing songs, "Sustenance" and "Crawl Inside", are unique to this release.

== Track listing ==
All music is composed by Neurosis.

No.	Title	Length
1.	"Locust Star" (Edit)	4:00
2.	"Aeon" (Edit)	3:40
3.	"Eye" (Edit)	3:48
4.	"Aeon"	11:46
Total length:		23:14

All music is composed by Tribes of Neurot.

No.	Title	Length
5.	"Wolf Lava"	9:09
6.	"Sustenance"	9:50
7.	"Crawl Inside"	4:51
Total length:		23:50 (47:04)

== Personnel ==
Neurosis

- Scott Kelly – guitar, vocals, percussion
- Steve Von Till – guitar, vocals, percussion
- Noah Landis – keyboards, synthesizer, sampling
- Dave Edwardson – bass guitar, backing vocals
- Jason Roeder – drums, percussion
- Pete Inc. – visuals

Tribes of Neurot

- Dave Edwardson – percussion, bass, effects, programming
- Noah Landis – sampling, tapes
- Steve Von Till – synthesizers, electronics, noises, effects, tapes, drums, samplers, bass, timpani
