= An Undying Love for a Burning World =

Studio album by Neurosis
- Released: March 20, 2026
- Recorded: November 2025–February 2026
- Studios: Studio Litho; Seattle, Washington; Circular Ruin; Brooklyn, New York
- Genres: Post-metal; sludge metal; post-hardcore
- Length: 63:30
- Label: Neurot Recordings

Neurosis chronology
Fires Within Fires (2016)	An Undying Love for a Burning World (2026)

An Undying Love for a Burning World is the twelfth studio album by American post-metal band Neurosis. Their first album in 10 years, it was released, with no prior announcement, on March 20, 2026, via the band's own record label, Neurot Recordings. It is the band's first album with vocalist/guitarist Aaron Turner (formerly of the band Isis), replacing founder Scott Kelly who was fired from the band for domestic violence in 2019, as well as their first album since Through Silver in Blood (1996) that is not recorded by Steve Albini, who died in 2024.

== Background and recording ==
In 2022, after a few years of silence, Scott Kelly wrote a post admitting to "emotional, financial, verbal and physical abuse" towards his family. In response, Neurosis stated their intolerance at Kelly's actions and that they fired him in 2019.

After a few more years of uncertainty, Aaron Turner was hired as Kelly's full-time replacement. He began rehearsing with Neurosis in April 2024. Steve Von Till said that Turner had been friends with the band for a long time, but "our only initial hesitation was, it's so frickin' obvious, it can't be right. And we'll never hear the end of the fucking Neur-Isis jokes." Turner had already toured with Neurosis as a member of both Isis and Sumac. The band only rehearsed with Turner three times in 2024 because of members' busy schedules. First, the band asked Turner to learn how to play some old Neurosis songs so that they could have something to practice together, but afterwards Turner began to contribute his own ideas.

Turner explained his thoughts on joining Neurosis: "From the moment I first heard Neurosis over 30 years ago, I felt this was the music my heart and mind had been seeking but not yet heard. Now after many years traveling along various musical paths of my own, the singular sound and spirit embodied by Neurosis continues to speak to the depths of my being. It is an honour and a true pleasure to have been welcomed so warmly into a band that not only shaped my perspective on the limitless possibilities of music, but has lived and exemplified the necessity of upholding creative integrity and camaraderie above all else."

An Undying Love for a Burning World was recorded at Studio Litho in Seattle by Scott Evans, known for his production work with Kowloon Walled City, Sumac, and Great Falls, followed by mixing at Antisleep Audio in Oakland. The album's lyrical themes are centered around "the realities of modern existence, addressing isolation, anxiety, environmental collapse, and the search for meaning in an increasingly fragmented world." In a statement released with the album's announcement, the band said, "The trials and tribulations in our personal lives and as a band, combined with simply trying to navigate the insanity of our society, with the stress, anxiety, and isolation that come with it can be excruciating."

== Promotion ==
To promote the album, Neurosis headlined the Fire in the Mountains festival in Montana in July 2026, their first show in seven years. They were supported by other bands including Baroness, Enslaved, Borknagar, Yob, Agalloch, Full of Hell, 16 Horsepower, and Amigo the Devil.

Neurosis was invited to perform at that festival by Firekeeper Alliance, an indigenous-youth suicide prevention charity involving guitarist/co-vocalist Steve Von Till. Von Till explained, "I cannot think of a more appropriate environment for us to return to the stage. Last year’s Fire in the Mountains festival was the most profound music event I have ever been a part of. The weekend took on a healing, cathartic ceremonial nature that is difficult to put into words. Using emotionally heavy music to build community and collectively stare darkness in the eye is something we have always believed in, but using it to directly address the heartbreaking reality of suicide, grief, loss and trauma is taking it to another level."

== Critical reception ==
Professional ratings
Aggregate scores
Source	Rating
Metacritic	88/100
Review scores
Source	Rating
Beats per Minute	87%
Blabbermouth.net	9/10
Pitchfork	8.3/10
The Quietus	80/100
Rolling Stone	4.5/5 stars
Sputnikmusic	5/5

According to the review aggregator Metacritic, An Undying Love for a Burning World received "universal acclaim" based on a weighted average score of 88 out of 100 from 8 critic scores. The album was praised for continuing the band's heavy, atmospheric yet dark sound, with The Quietus stating that it "follows Converge's Love Is Not Enough this year as a pivotal metal album about acknowledging the darkness for what it is and trying to accept it. On a planet where "the hive has lost its fucking mind" ('Untethered'), and following what seemed to be a mortal blow after Kelly's expulsion, Neurosis' return is something to marvel at. This new album has the smouldering afterburn quality of 2001’s A Sun That Never Sets, with a bite and psychedelia all its own. This new music is carefully constructed, cerebral, intrinsically heavy, and has the quiet amazement of someone looking at their near-forgotten reflection. It's not a complete transfiguration, but owns its corner of darkness, and shines precious shards of light on what might come."

== Track listing ==
No.	Title	Length
1.	"We Are Torn Wide Open"	0:52
2.	"Mirror Deep"	5:39
3.	"First Red Rays"	8:27
4.	"Blind"	9:05
5.	"Seething and Scattered"	8:13
6.	"Untethered"	4:02
7.	"In the Waiting Hours"	10:15
8.	"Last Light"	16:57
Total length:		63:30

== Personnel ==
Neurosis

- Jason Roeder – drums
- Aaron Turner – guitar, vocals
- Steve Von Till – guitar, vocals
- Dave Edwardson – bass, vocals
- Noah Landis – synthesizers, samples, backing vocals

Technical personnel

- Scott Evans – recording, mixing
- Randall Dunn – additional recording (track "Last Light")
- Matthew Barnhart – mastering
- Aaron Turner – layout, drawings, collage, artwork

== Charts ==
Chart performance for An Undying Love for a Burning World
Chart (2026)	Peak position
Australian Albums (ARIA)	52
Belgian Albums (Ultratop Flanders)	47
Belgian Albums (Ultratop Wallonia)	95
French Physical Albums (SNEP)	101
French Rock & Metal Albums (SNEP)	32
Scottish Albums (Official Charts)	57
Swiss Albums (Schweizer Hitparade)	36
UK Albums Sales (OCC)	72
UK Independent Albums (Official Charts)	30
UK Rock & Metal Albums (Official Charts)	11
