= A Sun That Never Sets =

Studio album by Neurosis
- Released: August 7, 2001
- Studios: Electrical Audio Recording in Chicago, Illinois
- Genres: Post-metal; sludge metal; doom metal
- Length: 68:30
- Label: Relapse
- Producers: Steve Albini, Neurosis

Neurosis chronology
Sovereign (2000)	A Sun That Never Sets (2001)	Neurosis & Jarboe (2003)

A Sun That Never Sets is the seventh album by the American post-metal band Neurosis, released in 2001. The band later released a DVD of a full-length film, which the album accompanies. The album represented a shift towards softer musical elements as opposed to the harsh, primal sounds of the band's previous releases, a change that would result in the album receiving mixed reception. Despite this, the album was awarded number 18 on Decibel Magazine's Top 100 metal albums of the decade.

== Background ==
Following the success of their previous two albums, Through Silver in Blood and Times of Grace, Neurosis founded their own record label, Neurot Records, which, in addition to releasing material from Neurosis and its associated projects, signed several other artists. Despite this, this album would be distributed by Relapse Records.

== Content ==
The album began a shift by the band towards clean vocals, acoustic instrumentation, folk influences, more noted presence of classical string instruments (which had been used sparsely since Souls At Zero) as well as slower tempos and a more contemplative sound, that would continue for the rest of their discography until their 12th album, An Undying Love for a Burning World. Allmusic described this change as an "aesthetic sea change".

== Reception ==
Professional ratings
Review scores
Source	Rating
AllMusic	2.5/5 stars
BraveWords	8.5/10

The album has received mixed reception since its release thanks to the aesthetic changes made by the band. Patrick Kennedy of Allmusic would rate the album 2.5 stars out of 5, explaining, "The title of this release carries a current of sad irony. After well over a decade of dedicated touring and recording, Oakland, California's acclaimed sonic trailblazers seem, indeed, with this disc, heading inexorably towards twilight."

== Track listing ==
All tracks are written by Steve Von Till and Dave Edwardson.

No.	Title	Length
1.	"Erode"	1:50
2.	"The Tide"	8:50
3.	"From the Hill"	9:26
4.	"A Sun That Never Sets"	5:00
5.	"Falling Unknown"	13:12
6.	"From Where Its Roots Run"	3:43
7.	"Crawl Back In"	6:52
8.	"Watchfire"	8:28
9.	"Resound"	1:27
10.	"Stones from the Sky"	9:46
Total length:		68:30

== Personnel ==
=== Performance ===
==== Neurosis ====
- Scott Kelly – guitar, vocals
- Noah Landis – keyboards, sampling, sound manipulation
- Jason Roeder – drums
- Steve Von Till – guitar, vocals
- Dave Edwardson – bass, backing vocals
- Josh Graham – live visual media

==== Additional personnel ====
- Kris Force – violin, viola

=== Production ===
- Chris Manfrin – assistant engineer
- Greg Norman – assistant engineer
- John Golden – mastering
- Steve Albini – engineer, producer
