= Given to the Rising =

Studio album by Neurosis
- Released: May 8, 2007
- Genres: Post-metal; sludge metal
- Length: 70:42
- Label: Neurot Recordings
- Producers: Steve Albini, Neurosis

Neurosis chronology
The Eye of Every Storm (2004)	Given to the Rising (2007)	Honor Found in Decay (2012)

Given to the Rising is the ninth studio album by American post-metal band Neurosis, released on June 5, 2007. The album is available in a standard jewel case, a limited-edition digipak, and a limited-edition double LP, all with the same track list. Decibel Magazine listed Given to the Rising as the 76th-best metal album of the decade. A DVD documentary is also available from Neurot Records. The artwork for the album, designed by Josh Graham, is a mixture of photos from Heroes Square in Budapest and drawings inspired by the place. Coincidentally, singer/guitarist Steve Von Till and Josh Graham had separately thought of the idea of using Heroes Square as the artwork for the album.

== Musical style ==
The album has been described by music critics as a more aggressive, heavier album than their recent previous output, showcasing a "more direct and hard-hitting approach", resulting in "their heaviest record since 99's 'Times Of Grace'".

== Critical reception ==
Professional ratings
Review scores
Source	Rating
AllMusic	4/5 stars
The A.V. Club	B+
Pitchfork	(8.6/10)
PopMatters	8/10 stars
Rock Sound	9/10 stars
Spin	4/5 stars
Stylus	A−

The album received critical acclaim upon release. In D. Shawn Bosler's review of the album for Pitchfork, he described it as "their best album in a decade." AllMusic's Thom Jurek praised it as "one hell of an album, better than anyone had any right to expect, and one of the high moments in a career filled with them. Neurosis have no need of caricatures or "more evil than thou" posturing. They are in a league of their own, and from the sounds of Given to the Rising, will remain there for some time."

== Track listing ==
All tracks are written by Steve Von Till and Dave Edwardson.

No.	Title	Length
1.	"Given to the Rising"	8:55
2.	"Fear and Sickness"	7:13
3.	"To the Wind"	7:38
4.	"At the End of the Road"	8:25
5.	"Shadow"	2:26
6.	"Hidden Faces"	5:33
7.	"Water Is Not Enough"	7:03
8.	"Distill (Watching the Swarm)"	9:13
9.	"Nine"	2:28
10.	"Origin"	11:48
Total length:		70:42

== Personnel ==
Neurosis

- Scott Kelly – vocals, guitar
- Dave Edwardson – bass, backing vocals
- Jason Roeder – drums, percussions
- Steve Von Till – guitar, vocals
- Noah Landis – keyboards, synthesizers, effects, backing vocals
- John Graham – visual media

Technical personnel

- Steve Albini – production, mastering
- John Graham – artwork

== Chart performance ==
Charts (2007)	Peak position
US Billboard Heatseekers	31
