= The Eye of Every Storm =

2004 album by Neurosis

Studio album by Neurosis
- Released: June 28, 2004
- Genres: Post-metal; post-rock; sludge metal
- Length: 68:52
- Labels: Relapse, Neurot
- Producers: Steve Albini, Neurosis

Neurosis chronology
Neurosis & Jarboe (2003)	The Eye of Every Storm (2004)	Given to the Rising (2007)

Professional ratings
Review scores
Source	Rating
AllMusic	link
Stylus Magazine	B link
Pitchfork	7.0/10

The Eye of Every Storm is the eighth studio album by American post-metal band Neurosis.

== Style ==
It tones down the strong folk music influences that were prominent on the band's previous album, A Sun That Never Sets, while incorporating more industrial elements. The album explores their trudging and massive sound with a more dynamic approach, closer to post-rock than their earlier work.

== Track listing ==
All tracks are written by Steve Von Till and Dave Edwardson.

No.	Title	Length
1.	"Burn"	7:08
2.	"No River to Take Me Home"	8:42
3.	"The Eye of Every Storm"	11:56
4.	"Left to Wander"	8:12
5.	"Shelter"	5:18
6.	"A Season in the Sky"	9:50
7.	"Bridges"	11:36
8.	"I Can See You"	6:10
Total length:		68:52

== Personnel ==
=== Neurosis ===
- Scott Kelly – guitar, vocals
- Steve Von Till – guitar, vocals, filtered and textured sounds ["filters & textures"]
- Dave Edwardson – bass, Moog synthesizer, sounds ["space"]
- Noah Landis – organ, piano, samples, effects ["atmospheres"]
- Jason Roeder – drums
- Josh Graham – visual media

=== Additional musicians ===
- Desmond Shea – trumpet on "Left to Wander" and "Shelter"
- Jeffrey Luck Lucas – cello on "I Can See You"
