= Jason Roeder =

American drummer

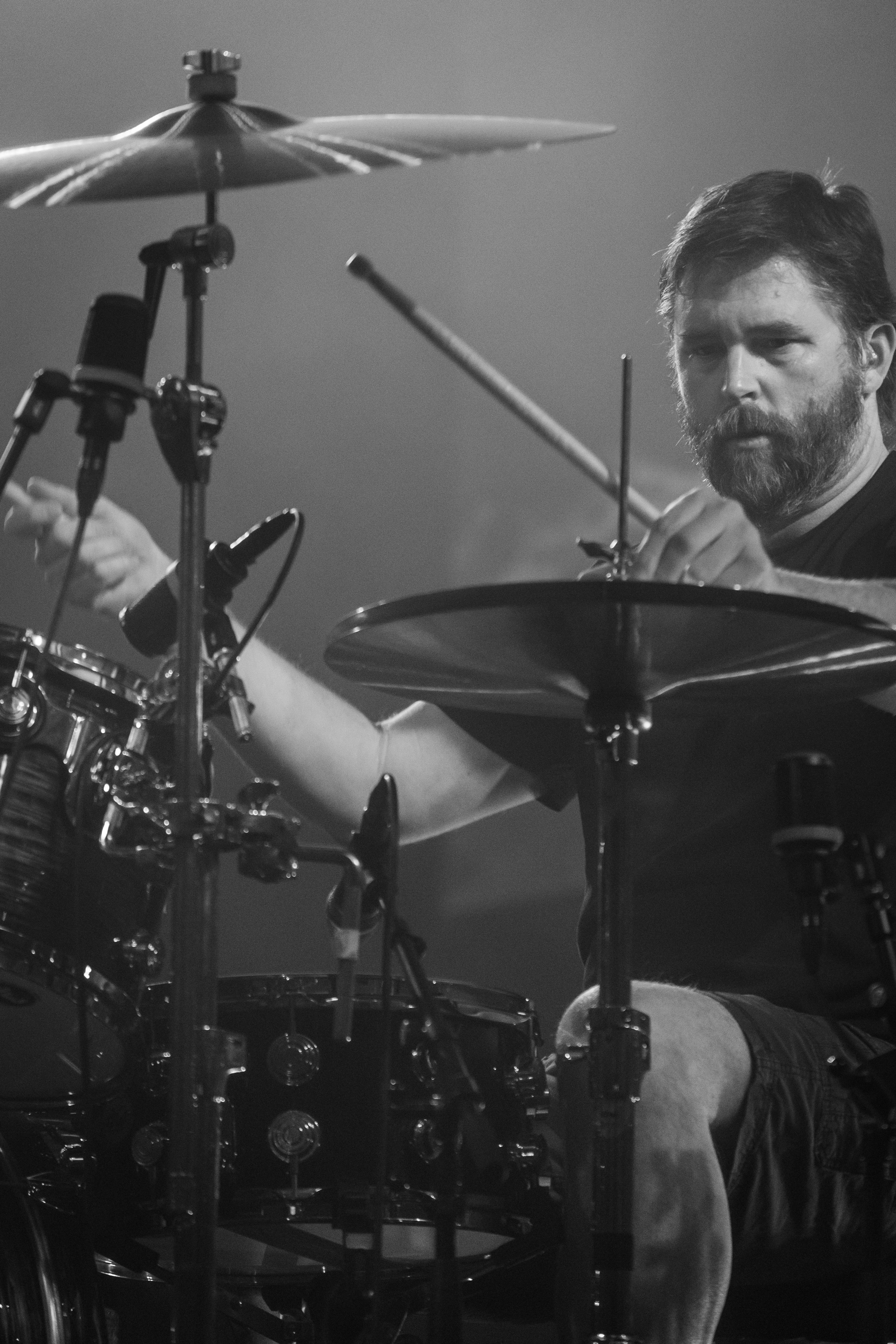
- Jason Roeder performing with Sleep at Roadburn Festival in 2019

Background information
- Genres: Doom metal, post-metal, experimental, hardcore punk
- Occupation: Musician
- Instrument: Drums
- Years active: 1985–present
- Labels: Neurot, Relapse, Alternative Tentacles, Lookout!, Alchemy
- Member of: Neurosis (band)
- Formerly of: Sleep, Violent Coercion

Jason Roeder is an American drummer for Oakland-based metal band Neurosis, and formerly of the band Sleep.

He played in the hardcore punk band Violent Coercion with Scott Kelly and Dave Edwardson before the trio formed Neurosis in 1985. The group also formed experimental/noise project Tribes of Neurot, Neurosis' alter ego. In 2010, Roeder replaced the retiring drummer of the stoner metal band Sleep.

On January 26th 2025, Jason announced his retirement as a touring musician on his official Instagram saying "I am no longer a touring musician so I will be selling off most (possibly all) of my equipment and belongings.". Along with this he changed his Instagram biography to say "l used to go on stage and pretend I was supposed to be there." As of March 2025, These posts have been deleted along with the Instagram biography and his Profile picture.

In 2025 Jason Roeder announced he was no longer a member of the band Sleep and had been "unceremoniously fired over the phone".

In March 2026, Neurosis announced the release of their first album in 10 years, 'An Undying Love For A Burning World', featuring Roeder on drums.

== Equipment ==
Roeder plays on kits with only a single rack and floor tom since he was 12 years old since the basic set-up forces more creativity. He custom builds his own snare drums while using DW hardware and Paiste cymbals.

== Discography ==
Neurosis

- Pain of Mind (1987)
- The Word as Law (1990)
- Souls at Zero (1992)
- Enemy of the Sun (1993)
- Through Silver in Blood (1996)
- Times of Grace (1999)
- A Sun That Never Sets (2001)
- The Eye of Every Storm (2004)
- Given to the Rising (2007)
- Honor Found in Decay (2012)
- Fires Within Fires (2016)
- An Undying Love for a Burning World (2026)

Neurosis & Jarboe

- Neurosis & Jarboe (2003)

Tribes of Neurot

- Rebegin (1995)
- Silver Blood Transmission (1995)
- Static Migration (1998)
- Grace (1999)
- 60° (2000)
- Adaptation and Survival: the Insect Project (2002)
- Meridian (2005)

Sleep

- "The Clarity" (2014)
- The Sciences (2018)
- "Leagues Beneath" (2018)
