= Fires Within Fires =

Studio album by Neurosis
- Released: September 23, 2016
- Studio: Electrical Audio Studio
- Genres: Post-metal; experimental metal; doom metal
- Length: 40:50
- Label: Neurot Recordings
- Producer: Steve Albini

Neurosis chronology
Honor Found in Decay (2012)	Fires Within Fires (2016)	An Undying Love for a Burning World (2026)

Fires Within Fires is the eleventh studio album by American post-metal band Neurosis. The album was released on September 23, 2016, via the band's own record label, Neurot Recordings. Recording began on December 27, 2015, at Electrical Audio Studio; the album was produced by Steve Albini and the cover art created by Thomas Hooper. Like Neurosis' previous albums, Fires Within Fires combines "elements from the post-metal genre they co-created [with] elements of industrial, doom, punk and folk". This is the band's final album with founding member Scott Kelly who was fired in 2019 due to domestic abuse allegations, which he officially confirmed to be true and announced his withdrawal from the public eye in August 2022.

== Critical reception ==
Professional ratings
Aggregate scores
Source	Rating
Metacritic	85/100
Review scores
Source	Rating
AllMusic	4/5 stars
The A.V. Club	A−
Blabbermouth	7/10
Exclaim!	7/10
Kerrang!	4/5 stars
Pitchfork	7.1/10
Metal Hammer	4/5 stars
musicOMH	4.5/5 stars
Sputnikmusic	4.0/5

The album received an average score of 85/100 from 10 reviews on Metacritic, indicating "universal acclaim". Thom Jurek of AllMusic wrote, "Given [the album's] relative brevity, it's among the few albums in their catalog that doesn't leave the listener exhausted (not a bad thing by any means), but wanting more." The A.V. Club writer, J.J. Anselmi, said, "Fires Within Fires is yet another invaluable contribution from this legendary band."

=== Accolades ===
Year	Publication	Country	Accolade	Rank
2016	CVLT Nation	United States	"CVLT Nation's Albums of the Year for 2016"	1
2017	Rolling Stone	United States	"20 Best Metal Albums of 2016"	5
2016	Rough Trade	United States	"Albums of the Year 2016"	96
2016	Terrorizer	United States	"Terrorizer’s Albums of the Year, 2016"	1

== Track listing ==
All tracks are written by Steve Von Till and Dave Edwardson. Bold

No.	Title	Length
1.	"Bending Light"	7:46
2.	"A Shadow Memory"	6:50
3.	"Fire Is the End Lesson"	6:54
4.	"Broken Ground"	8:44
5.	"Reach"	10:36
Total length:		40:50

== Personnel ==
Neurosis

- Scott Kelly – vocals, guitar
- Dave Edwardson – bass, backing vocals
- Jason Roeder – drums, percussions
- Steve Von Till – guitar, vocals
- Noah Landis – keyboards, synthesizers, effects, backing vocals

Technical personnel

- Steve Albini – production
- Thomas Hooper – artwork

== Charts ==
Chart (2016)	Peak position
Belgian Albums (Ultratop Flanders)	124
Belgian Albums (Ultratop Wallonia)	121
French Albums (SNEP)	132
Scottish Albums (Official Charts)	81
Swiss Albums (Schweizer Hitparade)	64
US Top Hard Rock Albums (Billboard)	12
US Heatseekers Albums (Billboard)	8
US Top Rock Albums (Billboard)	39
