= Enemy of the Sun =

Studio album by Neurosis
- Released: August 17, 1993
- Genres: Sludge metal; industrial metal; post-metal; post-hardcore
- Length: 72:21; 61:41 (2010 reissue)
- Label: Alternative Tentacles
- Producer: Neurosis

Neurosis chronology
Souls at Zero (1992)	Enemy of the Sun (1993)	Through Silver in Blood (1996)

Reissue artwork

Enemy of the Sun is the fourth studio album by American post-metal band Neurosis. It was originally released on Alternative Tentacles in 1993 and later reissued on Neurot Recordings in 1999. The album was reissued with new cover artwork on April 20, 2010. On February 14, 2012, a fully remastered version was released on vinyl via Relapse Records. This album is the last Neurosis album to feature Simon McIlroy, who would be replaced with Noah Landis on future albums.

Though not as acclaimed as its predecessor, Souls at Zero, or its successor, Through Silver in Blood, the album has nonetheless been positively received.

== Content ==
Though their previous album, Souls at Zero, was a dramatic step forward for the band's post-metal direction, Enemy of the Sun is where this style became codified, with The Quietus observing that "at the time few could have predicted this black hole of agonizingly precise metal riffs, unnerving backmasking, industrial folkisms and extensive sampling".

The album opens with a sample from the movie adaptation of The Sheltering Sky. Coincidentally, the album Scenes from the Second Storey by The God Machine, released in the same year as Enemy of the Sun, opens with the same sample.

== Cover Art ==
The cover artwork depicts a statue from Toddington Manor in Gloucestershire, England – the subject is unknown but is most likely Saint Thomas Becket. Simon Marsden is the original photographer.

== Reception ==
Professional ratings
Review scores
Source	Rating
About.com	2.5/5 stars
AllMusic	4/5 stars
Rock Hard	8/10 stars

The album has generally received positive feedback since its release. Writing for Allmusic, Ned Raggett would state, "In 1993, Neurosis, and in a different but related way Swans, were practically on their own, and on Enemy of the Sun Neurosis built upon the reach and power of Souls at Zero to create another masterpiece of on-the-edge, high-volume rampage that resists easy genre classification."

In a mixed review, George Pacheco would write for About.com, "They are just there. Solid, I suppose. Enjoyable, to a degree. But missing something. This “something” has frustrated me for all of my time for Steve Von Till and Co. I still search for that secret spark within me; that moment of enlightenment which will truly make Neurosis click for me, so I can join the apparent thousands who see the band's name as legion, their word as law."

An episode of the TV series Home Improvement had the character Mark (played by Taran Noah Smith) wearing a T-shirt that featured the album.

== Track listing ==
All tracks are written by Steve Von Till and Dave Edwardson, except where noted.

No.	Title	Length
1.	"Lost"	9:41
2.	"Raze the Stray"	8:42
3.	"Burning Flesh in Year of Pig"	1:37
4.	"Cold Ascending"	3:44
5.	"Lexicon"	6:32
6.	"Enemy of the Sun"	7:33
7.	"The Time of the Beasts"	7:59
8.	"Cleanse"	26:35
Total length:		72:21

Bonus tracks
No.	Title	Length
9.	"Takeahnase" (demo version)	7:44
10.	"Cleanse II" (live in Oberhausen)	6:45

- The track "Cleanse" runs for 26:35 on the original CD. On the 1999 and 2010 reissues, it was edited down to 15:54.

== Personnel ==
Neurosis

- Scott Kelly − guitar, vocals
- Steve Von Till − guitar, vocals
- Dave Edwardson − bass, backing vocals
- Simon McIlroy − keyboards, tapes, samples
- Jason Roeder − drums
- Pete Inc. − live visual media

Additional musicians

- Kris Force – violin
- Erika Little – voice
- Paul Lew – horn

Technical personnel

- Neurosis − production
- Billy Anderson − engineering, mixing
- George Horn − mastering
- Michael Whitney − artwork, cover design

== Release history ==
Region	Date	Label	Format
Worldwide	August 17, 1993	Alternative Tentacles	CD
Worldwide reissue	1999	Neurot Recordings	CD
Worldwide reissue	August 20, 2010	Neurot Recordings	CD, digital
Worldwide reissue	February 14, 2012	Relapse Records	LP
