= Sovereign (EP) =

EP by Neurosis
- Released: October 31, 2000
- Genres: Post-metal; sludge metal; doom metal
- Length: 32:38
- Label: Neurot
- Producers: Steve Albini & Neurosis

Neurosis chronology
Times of Grace (1999)	Sovereign (2000)	A Sun That Never Sets (2001)

Alternative cover
- 2011 reissue cover

Professional ratings
Review scores
Source	Rating
Allmusic	2/5 stars

Sovereign is an EP by Californian band Neurosis. As with the previous album, Times of Grace (and each Neurosis album since) it was recorded by Steve Albini at Electric Audio in Chicago, Illinois. The CD contains a mixed-media CD-Rom portion featuring visuals and music reminiscent of their live shows and their work under the Tribes of Neurot moniker. In 2011 Neurot Recordings released a reissue that includes bonus track "Misgiven".

== Track listing ==
All tracks are written by Neurosis.

Original release
No.	Title	Length
1.	"Prayer"	7:27
2.	"An Offering"	7:50
3.	"Flood"	4:08
4.	"Sovereign"	13:15
Total length:		32:38

2011 reissue bonus track
No.	Title	Length
5.	"Misgiven"	6:41
Total length:		39:21

== Personnel ==
- Steve Von Till – guitar, vocals
- Scott Kelly – guitar, vocals
- Dave Edwardson – bass, vocals
- Noah Landis – keyboards, vocals
- Jason Roeder – drums
- Dave Collins - mastering
