= Neurosis & Jarboe =

Studio album by Neurosis & Jarboe
- Released: November 4, 2003
- Length: 59:46
- Label: Neurot

Neurosis chronology
A Sun That Never Sets (2001)	Neurosis & Jarboe (2003)	The Eye of Every Storm (2004)

Jarboe chronology
Disburden Disciple (2000)	Neurosis & Jarboe (2003)	A Mystery of Faith (2005)

Professional ratings
Review scores
Source	Rating
AllMusic	4.5/5 stars

Neurosis & Jarboe is a collaboration between American post-metal band Neurosis and singer-songwriter Jarboe, formerly of Swans. It was released on November 4, 2003 by Neurot Recordings. On August 2, 2019, the album was re-released on Neurot Recordings. The 2019 version was remastered by Bob Weston (of Shellac) with new artwork by Aaron Turner.

== Accolades ==
Publication	Country	Accolade	Year	Rank
Terrorizer	United Kingdom	Albums of the Year	2003	21

== Track listing ==
All lyrics are written by Jarboe; all music is composed by Dave Edwardson, Scott Kelly, Noah Landis, Jason Roeder and Steve Von Till.

No.	Title	Length
1.	"Within"	6:17
2.	"His Last Words"	6:22
3.	"Taker"	5:32
4.	"Receive"	6:33
5.	"Erase"	9:05
6.	"Cringe"	7:36
7.	"In Harm's Way"	6:35
8.	"Seizure"	11:46

== Production ==
Adapted from the Neurosis & Jarboe liner notes.

Musicians

- Dave Edwardson – instruments, effects, recording
- Jarboe – lead vocals, instruments, effects
- Scott Kelly – instruments, effects
- Noah Landis – instruments, effects, recording
- Jason Roeder – instruments, effects
- Steve Von Till – instruments, effects, recording

Production and additional personnel

- Jeff Byrd – recording
- William Faith – recording (1–4, 6–8)
- Chris Griffin – recording (5)
- Neurosis – mixing
- Desmond Shea – recording
- Tankpictures / Discreetcases;– art direction, design
- Cedric Victor – cover art

== Release history ==
Region	Date	Label	Format	Catalog
United States	2003	Neurot	CD	NR 028
