= Honor Found in Decay =

Studio album by Neurosis
- Released: October 30, 2012
- Recorded: Electrical Audio, Chicago, Illinois
- Genres: Post-metal; sludge metal
- Length: 60:32
- Labels: Neurot Recordings (CD, digital); Relapse Records (vinyl)
- Producers: Steve Albini, Neurosis

Neurosis chronology
Given to the Rising (2007)	Honor Found in Decay (2012)	Fires Within Fires (2016)

Honor Found in Decay is the tenth studio album by American post-metal band Neurosis, released on October 30, 2012. The album is notable for incorporating elements of folk music while furthering the heaviness that was emphasized on Neurosis' previous album, Given to the Rising. Honor Found in Decay was lauded by Sputnikmusic for being "as challenging and engrossing a record as they have ever produced and an incredible celebration of the band's legendary career". Guitarist and vocalist Steve Von Till cautioned that "if you're going put our record on, it's not going to be a party".

== Background ==
Considering the title of the album, Steve Von Till conceded that the band members cannot agree on its precise meaning, but "one thing that really resonates with me is that decay is the natural state of all things over time...When shit's falling apart, that is when you see the people who have honor and will stand by what they said, or those that are self-serving or dishonorable and stab people in the back".

Von Till characterized the band's development from Given to the Rising to Honor Found in Decay as focusing upon flow by contrasting harmony and disharmony. Writing for Decibel Magazine, Brent Burton noted that Honor Found in Decay "marks the first time Neurosis have successfully incorporated the songwriterly tendencies of Scott Kelly and Steve Von Till's solo careers. Folksy, but still explosively heavy".

As Von Till explained, "I always see our evolution as spiralling inward towards a core; we're constantly getting purer and purer; to the essence of what our music is supposed to be." Von Till, noting that Neurosis' objective is to outdo its past efforts results, describes how this drive affects Neurosis' more recent albums:

We don't rely solely on our strengths, which is obviously the heavy riff. We know how to bludgeon that to death, so we've spent decades exploring other territories and finding new ways to be heavy and new ways to integrate the things we love about music—harmony, dissonance, and the way they interplay, and distortion and beauty and how they intertwine. Then we try to weave it all together into some tapestry that becomes bigger than the simple sums of its parts, and becomes transcendent.

The interplay between harmony and dissonance was noted by several publications, with The Quietus describing Honor Found in Decay as "hideously punishing...yet beautiful".

== Songwriting and recording ==
Elements of the album dated back to the end of the songwriting process for the previous album, Given to the Rising. Scott Kelly explained that the band continued to "overwrite and then start subtracting [elements]...As far back as I can remember, there's always been an initial sort of reflection on where we were with the previous record and what we feel like doing, where we feel like we could be better. We sort of let that settle in and then let the music go as it wishes". Von Till explained that the lengthy songwriting process, which took over 5 years, was important to achieving the end result: "For these songs, we had to kind of let them reconstitute themselves or transform into a new shape over time...It's basically finding the opportunities to surrender ourselves to that kind of tangible spirit that drives everything we do".

Honour Found in Decay continued the band's working relationship with producer Steve Albini. The band spent 10 days in the studio, which was described by Von Till as "luxurious" in comparison with the 6 days allotted to the studio for Given to the Rising. Von Till described the relationship with Albini as fitting naturally with the approach and intent of Neurosis:

For me personally, I don't see a reason to go to anyone else. He is the best damn engineer in the world, I believe. He's very traditional, there's no tricks, there's no fix it later. There’s only an extremely high fidelity approach towards capturing a natural performance in a room...I don’t want to have to go to the control room and see if my tone is right, I've already spent the last twenty-some years making my guitar tone the way I want it. I just need it caught, captured in a pleasing form...and in [Albini], I have total trust. I don’t have to go into the control room and check...We record live as a band, dump the vocals on and mix that fucker. There’s no technical bullshit.

As Von Till explained, "People think that our music is very dense and complicated and layered, and that may be true in the way it's perceived, but it's just a single take of a band playing". Significantly, even the keyboard parts are played live in the studio, with The Quietus noting that the "interplay between electronics and amps is comparatively untouchable." Spin noted that "here more than on any previous Neurosis LP, he [Noah Landis] commandeers his bandmates' sustained chords and snail-paced tempos and fills the space with smartly tinted textures," which reference Joy Division, Ennio Morricone, and Jarboe.

== Artwork ==
The cover artwork features a totem with three arrows. This emblem, Von Till suggests, "represents the whole [that] is greater than the individual, the unity within a group creates more stability and more strength, which is definitely true of Neurosis". The totem itself is based on ancient arrowheads. Throughout the album's booklet, methods of communication interact with ancient symbols in order to illustrate the

paradox of...this person [who] is completely isolated, completely obsessing and completely dedicated to their own path, [yet] they feel the need to communicate it outside of themselves. They feel the need to broadcast it, which also represents what we do. We have this intense personal expression that doesn't require any sort of outside ego strokes...But then there is this strange desire to communicate it, it's not so personal that we leave it in the closet. We feel the need to put it out there.

Von Till explained that the artwork, with its "whole vibe of obsession, or meditation, or offerings" intentionally does not tell "an exact story", but rather "just hints at things - I think it’s a perfect visual space for people to trip on while they’re listening to the album." Scott Kelly elaborated upon Von Till's perspective, further delineating the story expressed in the artwork: "we started to build this room that was for this isolated person in a possibly post-apocalyptic setting, or after everything has broken down, trying to find his place. And the cover itself is his altar, his place where his spirit lives".

== Reception ==
Professional ratings
Aggregate scores
Source	Rating
Metacritic	81/100
Review scores
Source	Rating
About.com	4.5/5 stars
AllMusic	4/5 stars
Blabbermouth.net	9/10
CraveOnline	9.5/10
Exclaim!	8/10
The Guardian	4/5 stars
MetalSucks	5/5 stars
Pitchfork	7.9/10
PopMatters	8/10
Spin	8/10
Sputnikmusic	4/5 stars

According to Metacritic, the album received "universal acclaim" based on 20 critics.

Pitchfork praised the album for not "abandon[ing] the moody sprawl of the band's last few full-lengths" while "help[ing] restore urgency to an aesthetic that seemed in danger of growing soporific. It's become common to refer to Neurosis as post-metal, as if the band had outgrown the primal allure of the riff. Honor refutes that idea. It's a record that proves these grizzled artisans still know how to flex their muscles."

The Guardian also praised the band for the balance struck on Honor Found in Decay: "In less skilful hands, this relentless sonic oppression would be gruelling, but by expressing human frailty with such visceral abandon, Neurosis have once again turned darkness into euphoria." Similarly, PopMatters observed an equilibrium between "emotional complexity" and being "resoundingly heavy, with unguarded truth being just as important as thick atmospherics or colossal riffs."

== Track listing ==
All tracks are written by Steve Von Till and Dave Edwardson.

No.	Title	Length
1.	"We All Rage in Gold"	6:36
2.	"At the Well"	10:06
3.	"My Heart for Deliverance"	11:40
4.	"Bleeding the Pigs"	7:20
5.	"Casting of the Ages"	10:04
6.	"All Is Found... In Time"	8:50
7.	"Raise the Dawn"	5:56
Total length:		60:32

== Personnel ==
=== Neurosis ===
- Scott Kelly − vocals, guitars
- Steve Von Till − vocals, guitars
- Dave Edwardson − bass guitar, backing vocals
- Noah Landis − synthesizer, organ, piano, samples, backing vocals
- Jason Roeder − drums
- Josh Graham − visual artist

=== Additional musicians ===
- Greg Dale − narration on "Bleeding the Pigs"
- Anna Brown − narration on "My Heart for Deliverance"

=== Technical personnel ===
- John Golden − mastering
- Steve Albini − recording
- Josh Graham − artwork

== Charts ==
Chart	Peak position
U.S. Billboard Heatseekers Albums	10
U.S. Billboard Hard Rock Albums	23
U.S. Billboard Tastemaker Albums	19
