= Souls at Zero =

Studio album by Neurosis
- Released: May 19, 1992
- Recorded: February–March 1992
- Studios: Starlight Sound, Richmond
- Genres: Sludge metal; post-metal; experimental; post-punk; industrial metal
- Length: 61:15
- Label: Alternative Tentacles
- Producers: Bill Thompson, Neurosis

Neurosis chronology
The Word as Law (1990)	Souls at Zero (1992)	Enemy of the Sun (1993)

Reissue artwork

Souls at Zero is the third studio album by the American post-metal band Neurosis. It was released in 1992 by the Alternative Tentacles record label. Their first album with Simon Mcllroy, Souls at Zero marked a shift in the band's style, moving away from the fast-paced hardcore punk influences of their early work towards slower tempos and greater experimentation. With this change, Souls at Zero was one of the first post-metal albums.

While initially met with a mixed and confused reaction, the album has since been praised as a pioneering work in Neurosis' discography. On February 14, 2012, a fully remastered version was released on vinyl by Relapse Records.

== Background and recording ==
Neurosis’s first album, Pain of Mind, was heavily influenced by crust punk. However, the band began to shift away from this on the second album, The Word as Law, which was rooted in post-hardcore. The musicians were dissatisfied with the album and were interested in new methods to expand their sound, employing samples and instruments that were unorthodox for hardcore and metal at the time. Reinforcing this, the band hired Simon McIlroy and began to draw from influences outside of punk, such as Joy Division Scott Kelly has described the writing process for the album as a first step towards a lasting, individual sound.

Despite the tendency to experiment, the pieces were not created exclusively in jam sessions. Many of the elements of the pieces that were later put together were composed beforehand by the individual musicians and brought together in rehearsals. According to Kelly, the band has stuck with this method since then.

The band booked the Starlight Sound Studios in Richmond, California for the album, and produced the album with Bill Thompson. Scott Kelly has said of this period, "We stepped into the studio with the intention of doing whatever the hell we wanted. We had material and weren’t sure it would be an album. I remember stepping outside on the street at 7 a.m. and standing there with Steve (Von Till) and Jason (Roeder) and saying: 'Fuck, this is an album. This is a statement.'" However, they struggled with mixing the album, and eventually asked Alternative Tentacles owner Jello Biafra, who was experienced in using studio equipment, to join them as an additional sound engineer. Biafra was responsible for the final mix.

== Musical style ==
Souls at Zero has been described as a sludge metal, post-metal, experimental, post-punk, and industrial metal album. The album employs various techniques atypical to metal, especially in the early 1990s, such as classical strings, woodwind instruments and sampling. The band was inspired by hip-hop artists such as Dr. Dre in this regard, according to Scott Kelly, "We wanted to use samples to go with rhythm in a cacophonous pattern. We were aware of what people like Dr. Dre were doing. It would be negligent to say we weren’t. Dre was on a level of his own in constructing layers and tension through samples."

The lyrics were written by Scott Kelly. The lyrics, though cryptic, address themes such as social isolation, aggression and depression.

== Release ==
The album was released on May 19, 1992 by Alternative Tentacles as a cassette, CD and LP. It was reissued in 1999 with bonus tracks on the band's own Neurot Recordings label. On February 15, 2010, the album was reissued on CD and digitally with new artwork by Neurot. On February 14, 2012, the album was remastered and rereleased on vinyl by Relapse Records.

=== Tour ===
The band would go on tour to support the album in 1992. Steve von Till described this tour as formative to the group’s style, saying, “It was taking that material out on the road and losing ourself in the trance states induced by playing hypnotic, super-heavy loud music that we really figured out how to surrender to it. Then we said, OK – this is going to take us to where we wanna go: somewhere deeper, somewhere more emotional, somewhere elemental."

== Reception and legacy ==
Professional ratings
Review scores
Source	Rating
About.com	4/5 stars
AllMusic	3/5 stars
Drowned in Sound	9/10
Exclaim!	favorable
Rock Hard	(favorable)

Upon release, the album disturbed and overwhelmed many critics. Ned Raggett of AllMusic described the album as "too often too much of a good thing". Nevertheless, he highlighted the use of obscure samples. Michael Rensen called the album an "extremely weird mix" in his review for the metal magazine Rock Hard and refrained from giving a rating.

In retrospect, Souls at Zero has been praised as a seminal release in the development of post-metal and sludge metal. Joachim Hiller from Ox-Fanzine described this album, along with their subsequent album Enemy of the Sun as "the high point of their work." Lars Brinkmann of Spex also stressed the importance of Souls at Zero for post-metal and related genres, saying the album, "concentrated everything that hundreds of bands needed over the next 15 years to be able to rub themselves raw at the interfaces of metal/hardcore and noise/rock. Nevertheless, to date no band has managed to unleash such violent hurricanes of suffering and to make both music halls and occupied houses tremble with voluptuous pathos."

The album was inducted into Decibel Magazine's Hall of Fame in August 2016.

== Track listing ==
All tracks are written by Steve Von Till and Dave Edwardson, except where noted.

No.	Title	Length
1.	"To Crawl Under One's Skin"	7:51
2.	"Souls at Zero"	9:18
3.	"Zero"	1:40
4.	"Flight"	4:05
5.	"The Web"	4:55
6.	"Sterile Vision"	6:20
7.	"A Chronology for Survival"	9:34
8.	"Stripped"	8:00
9.	"Takeahnase"	7:56
10.	"Empty"	1:36
Total length:		61:15

Bonus tracks
No.	Title	Length
11.	"Souls" (demo version)	8:28
12.	"Zero" (demo version)	1:14
13.	"Cleanse III" (Live in London)	5:38

== Personnel ==
Neurosis

- Scott Kelly − lead vocals, guitar
- Steve Von Till − lead vocals, guitar
- Dave Edwardson − bass guitar, backing vocals
- Simon McIlroy − keyboards, synthesizers, samples, effects, backing vocals
- Jason Roeder − drums, percussion
- Adam Kendall − visual media

Additional musicians

- Kris Force − violin, viola
- Sarah Augros − flute
- Walter P. Sunday − cello
- Siovhan King − trumpet

Technical personnel

- Neurosis − production
- Bill Thompson − production, engineering
- Jello Biafra − mixing
- Malcolm Sherwood − engineering
- Jeffrey Gray − engineering
- Jeff Fogerty − engineering
