= Christ on Parade =

American hardcore punk band

- Origin: San Francisco, California, U.S.
- Genres: Hardcore punk
- Years active: 1985–1989
- Spinoff of: Teenage Warning, Treason

Christ on Parade was an American, mid-late-1980s San Francisco East Bay political hardcore punk band, formed in 1985 by ex-members of Teenage Warning and peace punks Treason. Their debut, "Sounds of Nature" was issued on Pusmort Records. The group featured vocalist Barrie Evans, guitarists Mike Scott and Noah Landis, bassist Malcolm Sherwood, and drummer Todd Kramer. Some members lived in the East Bay's New Method Warehouse and they played shows with the Subhumans, Agnostic Front, Circle Jerks and Conflict. Christ On Parade headlined the first-ever show at Berkeley's long-running 924 Gilman venue.

They were an explicitly political band and their song "America the Myth" questioned the United States' foreign policy at the time, while they dedicated "Landlord Song" to the owner of the New Method Warehouse. However, the band stressed the fact that they were uninterested in proselytizing their audience:

No matter what it's about, politics, or just fucking daily life, if we write a song, we're not trying to push it on anybody. It's just make up your own mind. Get your own thoughts straight.

With three of the members deep into skateboarding, their music was included on a compilation cassette issued by Thrasher magazine, "Thrasher Skate Rock Vol. 3". Mike Scott left the band in 1986 and was replaced by guitarist Doug Kearney and, in late 1987, bassist Ron Nichols replaced the departing Sherwood. The group officially disbanded in 1989 after touring Europe. Landis would later form Blister (also with Kearney) before joining Neurosis in the mid-1990s. Evans formed psychobilly group the Hellbillys. Mike Scott joined Arkansas ex-pats Econochrist. Nichols formed Grinch after Christ On Parade broke up.

In 2008, the original line-up of Christ On Parade reunited for a tour of Europe and the west coast of the U.S., returning to play two nights at 924 Gilman Street, the punk club in Berkeley, California, where the band headlined their first show on December 31, 1986. 2009 saw the band tour Japan and they toured the western U.S., most likely their final tour, in 2010.
