= Steve Von Till =

American musician

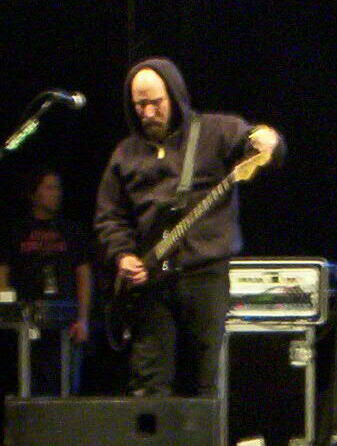
- Von Till with Neurosis at Hellfest 2007

Background information
- Born: Stephen Francis Von Till Jr. September 30, 1969 (age 56)
- Genres: Post-metal, sludge metal, experimental, folk
- Occupation: Musician
- Instruments: Vocals, guitar
- Years active: 1989–present
- Website: vontill.org

Stephen Francis Von Till Jr. (born September 30, 1969) is an American musician, best known as the guitarist of the metal band Neurosis, in which he also shared lead vocals with former member Scott Kelly and now shares lead vocals with Aaron Turner. He also records solo work under both his given name and the moniker Harvestman.

== Career ==
Von Till joined Neurosis in 1989. and the group would later form experimental/noise group Tribes of Neurot, Neurosis' alter ego.

=== Solo ===
Von Till's solo music as a singer songwriter has been described as a hybrid of "haunting" folk songs, rural psychedelia and expansive gothic Americana full of melancholic beauty. These songs are often built around sparse arrangements, the centerpiece of which is his distinctive solemn weathered voice and minimal acoustic guitar stylings.

In his works Steve fuses multiple genres, such as recorded psychedelia, ambient, folk, lo-fi, krautrock, fuzz guitars, and combines technical features, such as analog delays, and vintage synthesizers that create a cohesive meditative body of his music. Borrowing the concept from dub music of using the recording studio as an instrument, Von Till often considers the mixes themselves as the performance where he is able to break down, manipulate, and rebuild the tracks into new forms.

On May 6, 2020, Von Till announced a collection of poetry and lyrics titled Harvestman.

== Equipment ==
Von Till plays Jazzcaster- and Telecaster-style guitars assembled from Warmoth parts. He employs Lollar P90 (bridge) and Bartolini strat style (neck) pickups. His main distortion pedals are Keeley-modded ProCo Rat pedals, a vintage MXR Distortion +, Land of the Rising Fuzz shin ei clone, and a Fulltone OCD.

Using a wide variety of delay and modulation effects, his pedalboards have been known to include the Mutron Phasor II, MXR Carbon Copy delay, Dry Bell Vibe Machine Uni-Vibe clone, Electro-Harmonix Bass Micro Synthesizer, and a Chicago Iron Parachute Wah. His signal routing is all controlled by a custom made switching system by Bob Bradshaw of Custom Audio Electronics. The signal is routed to a Mesa/Boogie Mark IV with 2 2x12 Ear Candy cabs and a Garnet Session Man 2x12 combo (commonly replaced with a Fender ’65 Twin Reverb Reissue combo when renting gear).

Von Till's main acoustic guitar is a 1965 Gibson J-50 when playing solo as Harvestman.

== Personal life ==
Outside his role as a musician, Von Till works as an elementary school teacher in North Idaho.

== Discography ==
=== With Neurosis ===
- The Word as Law (1990)
- Empty (EP, 1990)
- Souls at Zero (1992)
- Enemy of the Sun (1993)
- Through Silver in Blood (1996)
- Times of Grace (1999)
- Sovereign (EP, 2000)
- A Sun That Never Sets (2001)
- Neurosis & Jarboe (2003)
- The Eye of Every Storm (2004)
- Given to the Rising (2007)
- Honor Found in Decay (2012)
- Fires Within Fires (2016)
- An Undying Love for a Burning World (2026)

=== With Tribes of Neurot ===
- Rebegin (1995)
- Silver Blood Transmission (1995)
- Static Migration (1998)
- Grace (1999)
- 60° (2000)
- Adaptation and Survival: the Insect Project (2002)
- Meridian (2005)

=== Solo albums ===
- As the Crow Flies (2000)
- If I Should Fall to the Field (2002)
- A Grave Is a Grim Horse (2008)
- A Life Unto Itself (2015)
- No Wilderness Deep Enough (2020)
- A Deep voiceless Wilderness (2021)
- Alone in a World of Wounds (2025)

=== As Harvestman ===
- Lashing the Rye (2005)
- In a Dark Tongue (2009)
- Trinity Score to the film h2odio, a full-length feature film by Italian director Alex Infascelli.
- Music for Megaliths (2017)
- Triptych: Part One (2024)
- Triptych: Part Two (2024)
- Triptych: Part Three (2024)
