= The Word as Law =

Studio album by Neurosis
- Released: February 1990; May 1991 (CD reissue)
- Recorded: Sound & Vision, 684 Indiana, San Francisco; December 1989 (Original tracks); February 15–17, 1991 (Bonus tracks)
- Genre: Crust punk; crossover thrash
- Length: 38:03
- Label: Lookout!
- Producer: Mark Lemaire, Neurosis

Neurosis chronology
Pain of Mind (1987)	The Word as Law (1990)	Souls at Zero (1992)

Professional ratings
Review scores
Source	Rating
Allmusic	link

The Word as Law is the second studio album by American post-metal band Neurosis. It was released in 1990 through Lookout! Records, originally on LP only. In 1991, the album was released on CD with several re-recorded tracks from previous releases as bonus material.

The Word as Law is the first Neurosis album to feature Steve Von Till.

A different version of "Common Inconsistencies" is featured on the November 1988 compilation The Thing That Ate Floyd.

== Track listing ==
1. "Double-Edged Sword" – 4:05 (Music & Lyrics: Kelly)
2. "The Choice" – 4:07 (Music: Edwardson, Lyrics: Edwardson/Kelly)
3. "Obsequious Obsolescence" – 5:12 (Music: Kelly/Edwardson/Von Till, Lyrics: Kelly)
4. "To What End?" – 6:23 (Music & Lyrics: Von Till)
5. "Tomorrow's Reality" – 5:47 (Music & Lyrics: Edwardson)
6. "Common Inconsistencies" – 4:24 (Music: Edwardson, Lyrics: Edwardson/Kelly)
7. "Insensitivity" – 0:47 (Music & Lyrics: Edwardson)
8. "Blisters" – 7:18 (Music: Kelly/Edwardson, Lyrics: Kelly)

=== Bonus tracks ===
1. "Life on Your Knees" – 2:54 (Music: Edwardson, Lyrics: Kelly/Edwardson)
2. "Pain of Mind" – 3:10 (Music: Kelly/Edwardson, Lyrics: Kelly)
3. "Grey" – 3:01 (Music: Edwardson, Lyrics: Kelly)
4. "United Sheep" – 3:15 (Music & Lyrics: Kelly)
5. "Pollution" – 4:09 (Music & Lyrics: Kelly)
6. "Day of the Lords" - 5:17 (Joy Division cover)
7. "Untitled" – 10:41

== Personnel ==
- Scott Kelly − guitar, vocals
- Steve Von Till − guitar, vocals
- Dave Edwardson − bass guitar, vocals
- Jason Roeder − drums
