= Pain of Mind =

Studio album by Neurosis
- Released: December 1987
- Genre: Hardcore punk; crust punk; crossover thrash
- Length: 37:33
- Label: Alchemy (1987); Alternative Tentacles (1990, 1994); Neurot (2000)
- Producer: Neurosis

Neurosis chronology
Black (EP) (1986)	Pain of Mind (1987)	The Word as Law (1989)

Alternative cover
- The 1994 vinyl reissue cover to Pain of Mind

Professional ratings
Review scores
Source	Rating
AllMusic	link
Blabbermouth.net	7/10

Pain of Mind is the debut studio album by American post-metal band Neurosis, originally released through Alchemy Records in 1987. It was later reissued by Alternative Tentacles in 1994 and by Neurot Recordings in 2000; the 2000 reissue contains a special bonus disc that includes live tracks, live radio tracks, and demo tracks. Pennsylvanian politician R. Budd Dwyer is pictured on the front cover of the 1994 vinyl release, showing his suicide during a televised press conference in 1987.

Pain of Mind is the only Neurosis album to feature guitarist Chad Salter.

== Track listing ==
1. "Pain of Mind" – 3:06
2. "Self-Taught Infection" – 3:01
3. "Reasons to Hide" – 3:02
4. "Black" – 4:56
5. "Training" – 1:02
6. "Progress" – 1:46
7. "Stalemate" – 2:30
8. "Bury What's Dead" – 2:06
9. "Geneticide" – 2:34
10. "Ingrown" – 2:23
11. "United Sheep" – 3:06
12. "Dominoes Fall" – 3:00
13. "Life on Your Knees" – 2:20
14. "Grey" – 2:41

Bonus disc on 2000 reissue

1. "Stalemate" (live at Gilman) – 2:48
2. "Black" (live at Gilman) – 6:10
3. "Instrumental" (live at Gilman) – 3:12
4. "Grey" (live at WFMU '89) – 2:39
5. "Pollution" (live at WFMU '89) – 3:52
6. "Life on Your Knees" (live at WFMU) – 2:50
7. "Reasons to Hide" (first demo tape) – 3:21
8. "Ingrown" (first demo tape) – 2:40
9. "Pain of Mind" (first demo tape) – 3:49
10. "Dominoes Fall" (first demo tape) – 3:17

== Personnel ==
- Chad Salter – guitars, vocals
- Scott Kelly – guitars, vocals
- Dave Edwardson – bass, vocals
- Jason Roeder – drums
