= Static Migration =

Studio album by Tribes of Neurot & Walking Timebombs
- Released: January 27, 1998
- Recorded: Neurot and Coast Studios, San Francisco, California & Anomie Studios, Houston, Texas.
- Length: 1:10:15
- Label: Release Entertainment

Tribes of Neurot chronology
Silver Blood Transmission (1995)	Static Migration (1998)	Grace (1999)

Walking Timebombs chronology
Walking Timebombs (1997)	Static Migration (1998)	The Sleeping Sickness (1999)

Static Migration is a collaboration album between the bands Tribes of Neurot and Walking Timebombs, released on January 27, 1998, through Release Entertainment.

== Reception ==
Professional ratings
Review scores
Source	Rating
Allmusic	3/5 stars

Allmusic reviewer Tom Schulte gave the record 3 out of 5 stars, describing it as "a coherent vision of inner space travel" and a "fully textured and richly painted canvas of basic themes."

== Track listing ==
No.	Title	Length
1.	"Unspoken Path"	6:16
2.	"Rust"	3:54
3.	"Recurring Birth"	9:53
4.	"March to the Sun"	16:38
5.	"Origin Unknown"	6:14
6.	"Blood and Water"	8:40
7.	"Edgewood"	5:26
8.	"Head of the Scorpion"	13:10

== Personnel ==
Tribes of Neurot & Walking Time Bombs

- Ajax
- Billy Anderson
- Scott Ayers – mixing
- Danny
- Dave Edwardson
- Frank Garymartin
- Scott Kelly
- Noah Landis
- Pete Inc.
- Jason Roeder
- Steve Von Till

Additional musicians and production

- Matthew F. Jacobson – executive production
- Dave Shirk – mastering
- Bill Yurkiewicz – executive production, mastering
