= Through Silver in Blood =

Studio album by Neurosis
- Released: April 2, 1996
- Recorded: December 1995
- Studios: Brilliant Studios and Coast Studios in Oakland, California
- Genres: Post-metal; sludge metal
- Length: 70:32
- Label: Relapse
- Producers: Billy Anderson; Neurosis

Neurosis chronology
Enemy of the Sun (1993)	Through Silver in Blood (1996)	Times of Grace (1999)

2009 reissue cover
- Vinyl reissue sleeve artwork

Through Silver in Blood is the fifth studio album by American post-metal band Neurosis, released on April 2, 1996 through Relapse Records. The album was reissued in July 2009 on the band's own label, Neurot Recordings. Continuing the band's style established from Souls at Zero and Enemy of the Sun, the album was produced at a time of intense strife for the band, and as such the album is one of the darkest releases in the band's discography.

Since its release, Through Silver in Blood has been recognized not only as the band's critical and popular peak, but as one of the sources of post-metal and as one of the best metal albums of all time. It has received numerous accolades since its release as well.

Through Silver in Blood was preceded by Tribes of Neurot companion album Silver Blood Transmission (1995) and succeeded by a split EP between the two projects, Locust Star (1996).

== Background and composition ==
Neurosis bassist and vocalist Dave Edwardson described Through Silver in Blood as "more of an epic undertaking than the last one." In keeping with the band's progressively deeper experimentation into extreme metal, the album is notably slow, distorted, and heavy, drawing from influences such as Black Sabbath and Swans. As the band's first album to feature keyboardist Noah Landis, Through Silver in Blood marked a new level of darkness in Neurosis's experimentation.

During the creation of Through Silver in Blood, the band went through a period of difficulty. Scott Kelly, homeless at the time, was struggling with addiction, and Steve Von Till was going through "heavy things". Von Till called the album's creation "a fucking railroad through hell."

== Critical reception ==
Professional ratings
Review scores
Source	Rating
AllMusic	5/5 stars
Music Story	4/5 stars
OndaRock	8/10
Rock Hard	8.5/10

Through Silver in Blood has received widespread critical acclaim, with some publications citing it as both one of the first and one of the best post-metal albums. AllMusic writer Eduardo Rivadavia gave the album a perfect score, praising the album's challenging and rewarding nature. Writing for Rolling Stone, Steve Smith called Through Silver in Blood Neurosis's "transformative masterpiece: a titanic mix of hardcore and sludge-metal notions and sampled soundbites, balancing oppressive heaviness, hypnotic repetition and surprising vulnerability." Fact placed the album as number one on their list of best post-metal releases ever, writing, "This is alien, and can be unpleasant, but that’s the point – this is the spiritual successor to Black Sabbath, the album that started it all." The A.V. Club writer J.J. Anselmi said, "Through Silver in Blood has played an undeniable role in defining post-metal, and its influence reverberates in the sounds of countless bands. But this album inflicts levels of disorientation, fear, and hopelessness that few records have attained in the past 20 years, giving Through Silver in Blood a shelf life that has yet to glimpse an expiration date."

Since its release, Through Silver in Blood has appeared on several publications' best-of lists.

=== Accolades ===
Year	Publication	Country	Accolade	Rank
1998	Kerrang!	United Kingdom	"100 Albums You Must Hear Before You Die"	100
2011	Terrorizer	United Kingdom	"The Heaviest Albums Ever"	2
2015	Fact	United Kingdom	"The 40 Best Post-Metal Albums Ever Made"	1
2015	Fact	United Kingdom	"The 100 Best Albums of the 1990s"	27
2017	Rolling Stone	United States	"The 100 Greatest Metal Albums of All Time"	49
"*" denotes an unordered list.

== Track listing ==
All tracks are written by Steve Von Till and Dave Edwardson, except where noted.

No.	Title	Length
1.	"Through Silver in Blood"	12:11
2.	"Rehumanize"	1:46
3.	"Eye"	5:17
4.	"Purify"	12:18
5.	"Locust Star"	5:48
6.	"Strength of Fates"	9:43
7.	"Become the Ocean"	1:27
8.	"Aeon"	11:43
9.	"Enclosure in Flame"	10:19
Total length:		70:32

== Personnel ==
Personnel adapted from Through Silver in Blood liner notes.

Neurosis

- Scott Kelly – guitar, vocals, percussion
- Steve Von Till – guitar, vocals, percussion
- Noah Landis – keyboards, synthesizer, sampling
- Dave Edwardson – bass guitar, vocals
- Jason Roeder – drums, percussion
- Pete Inc. – visuals

Technical personnel

- Adam Munoz – engineering assistance
- Mike Johnson – engineering assistance
- Mike Bogus – engineering assistance
- Greg Horn – mastering
- Billy Anderson – production

Additional musicians

- John Goff – bagpipes
- Martha Burns – cello
- Kris Force – violin
