= Tribes of Neurot =

Experimental music group

- Origin: Oakland, California, U.S.
- Genres: Experimental, dark ambient, noise
- Years active: 1995–present
- Labels: Neurot Recordings; Release Entertainment; Relapse Records
- Spinoff of: Neurosis
- Members: Scott Kelly; Steve Von Till; Dave Edwardson; Noah Landis; Jason Roeder; Pete Inc. Billy Anderson; Ajax; Danny; Scott Ayers; Frank Garymartin
- Website: tribesofneurot.com

Tribes of Neurot is an American experimental music group formed by the members of Neurosis in 1995. Their music incorporates tribal sounds into ambient atmospheres.

== History ==
Tribes of Neurot is a side project of Neurosis that consists of all the members of Neurosis along with additional guest performers. The music explores many of the same themes that Neurosis does but from a radically different angle. Whereas Neurosis has structured songs rooted in heavy metal music, Tribes of Neurot has given them the freedom to explore practically anything in music and sound. For example, their album Adaptation and Survival (2002) consists entirely of insect noises which were mixed and altered similar to Musique concrète, to create something that sounds entirely different from the source material. Their albums can be wildly diverse, but Tribes of Neurot is often influenced by atmospheric dark ambient and similar genres.

Many of their releases coincide with Neurosis releases, such as Silver Blood Transmission and Neurosis' Through Silver in Blood. Tribes of Neurot's Grace epitomizes this: released alongside Neurosis' Times of Grace, the two discs are meant to be played simultaneously for an enhanced experience that neither disc delivers on its own.

Neurosis has been on hiatus since 2019, and Tribes of Neurot has not released any new material since 2005. The future of Tribes of Neurot is uncertain, given the 2022 announcement that Neurosis frontman Scott Kelly had been quietly expelled in 2019 from the band due to abusing his wife and family, news of which was not announced at the time due to a request for privacy from Kelly's wife. It is also unknown if the band will continue with the announcement of Aaron Turner joining Neurosis.

== Discography ==
=== Albums ===
- Silver Blood Transmission (1995 Release Entertainment)
- Static Migration (collaboration with Walking Time Bombs) (1998 Release Entertainment)
- Grace (1999 Neurot Recordings)
- Adaptation and Survival (2002 Neurot Recordings)
- Cairn 4×CD (2002 Neurot Recordings)
- A Resonant Sun CD (2002 Relapse Records)
- Meridian (2005 Neurot Recordings)

=== EPs ===
- Rebegin 2×7″ (1995 Alleysweeper Records)
- Locust Star (1996 Relapse Records)
- Rebegin CDEP (1997 Invisible Records)
- God of the Center 10-inch EP (1997 Conspiracy Records)
- Untitled 12-inch EP (1997 Abuse Records)
- Spring Equinox 1999 CDEP (1999 Neurot Recordings)
- Summer Solstice 1999 CDEP (1999 Neurot Recordings)
- Autumn Equinox 1999 CDEP (1999 Neurot Recordings)
- Winter Solstice 1999 CDEP (1999 Neurot Recordings)
- Spring Equinox 2000 CDEP (2000 Neurot Recordings)
- Summer Solstice 2000 CDEP (2000 Neurot Recordings)
- Autumn Equinox 2000 CDEP (2000 Neurot Recordings)
- Winter Solstice 2000 CDEP (2000 Neurot Recordings)
- Spring Equinox 2001 CDEP (2001 Neurot Recordings)
- Summer Solstice 2001 CDEP (2001 Neurot Recordings)
- Autumn Equinox 2001 CDEP (2001 Neurot Recordings)
- Winter Solstice 2001 CDEP (2001 Neurot Recordings)
- split 7-inch with Earth (2007 Neurot Recordings)

=== Compilation/Live ===
- 60° (60 Degrees) (2000 Neurot Recordings)
- Live at the Pale (2001 Neurot Recordings)
