= Scott Kelly (musician) =

American guitarist and singer

- Kelly in 2004

Background information
- Born: Scott Michael Kelly; July 16, 1967 (age 59); Evanston, Illinois, U.S.
- Origin: Oakland, California, U.S.
- Genres: Avant-garde metal; sludge metal; post-metal; experimental; folk; hardcore punk (early)
- Occupations: Singer, musician, songwriter
- Instruments: Vocals, guitar
- Years active: 1985–2022
- Formerly of: Neurosis, Tribes of Neurot, Shrinebuilder

Scott Michael Kelly (born July 16, 1967) is an American retired musician. He was one of three founding members of California experimental metal band Neurosis. He was the band's lead vocalist and guitarist from its formation until his firing in 2019. Kelly retired from music in 2022, after admitting to many years of physically abusing his family.

Aside from Neurosis, Kelly was also a member of the bands Tribes of Neurot, Blood and Time, Shrinebuilder, Corrections House, Mirrors of Psychic Warfare, and Absent in Body. He released three solo albums. Kelly has also appeared on six albums by the American metal band Mastodon, featuring on all of their albums from 2004's Leviathan to 2017's Emperor of Sand.

== Career ==
Kelly formed Neurosis in 1985, originally as a hardcore punk band with bassist Dave Edwardson, and drummer Jason Roeder. Kelly was the band's vocalist and guitarist, and the band released eleven studio albums together. Kelly was fired from Neurosis in 2019, after the band learned that he had been abusing his wife and children. For his family's protection, it remained unpublicized until 2022. Kelly admitted to committing the abuse in August 2022, and announced his retirement from music and public life.

In Shrinebuilder, Kelly collaborated with Al Cisneros, Scott Weinrich, and Dale Crover, whose first and only album was released in October 2009. Kelly was also a member of the supergroup Absent in Body, which formed in 2022. Members included Amenra's vocalist Colin H. Van Eeckhout, and guitarist Mathieu J. Vandekerckhove, alongside former Sepultura drummer Igor Cavalera.

In addition to his musical projects, Kelly and his Neurosis bandmates were co-owners Neurot Recordings. Beginning in April 2011, he began hosting a monthly three-hour streaming radio show on Scion A/V.com Channel 5 called KMBT. He previously owned and operated an Internet radio station of his own called combatmusicradio.com, which featured weekly shows from both himself, as well as other guests like Eugene S. Robinson, and Joe Preston.

Kelly also worked extensively as a solo artist, releasing three albums and doing over 400 solo performances worldwide since the year 2000.

== Musical influences ==
Kelly's major influences span a variety of genres, including Swans, Discharge, Black Sabbath, Pink Floyd, Die Kreuzen, Amebix, Jimi Hendrix, King Crimson, Neil Young, Melvins, Celtic Frost, Negative Approach, Townes Van Zandt, Voivod, and Hank Williams.

== Personal life ==
A native of the East Bay region near San Francisco, Kelly resided with his wife Sarah, and two youngest children in the woods of Southern Oregon. In August 2022, Kelly officially retired from music and public life after admitting to long-term abuse of his wife and children. That year, his living situation remained unknown. After learning of the abuse, the other members of Neurosis released a statement, condemning Kelly's behavior, and expelling him from the band in 2019. However, they respected a request for privacy from Kelly's wife, choosing not to publicly discuss the matter at the time.

== Discography ==
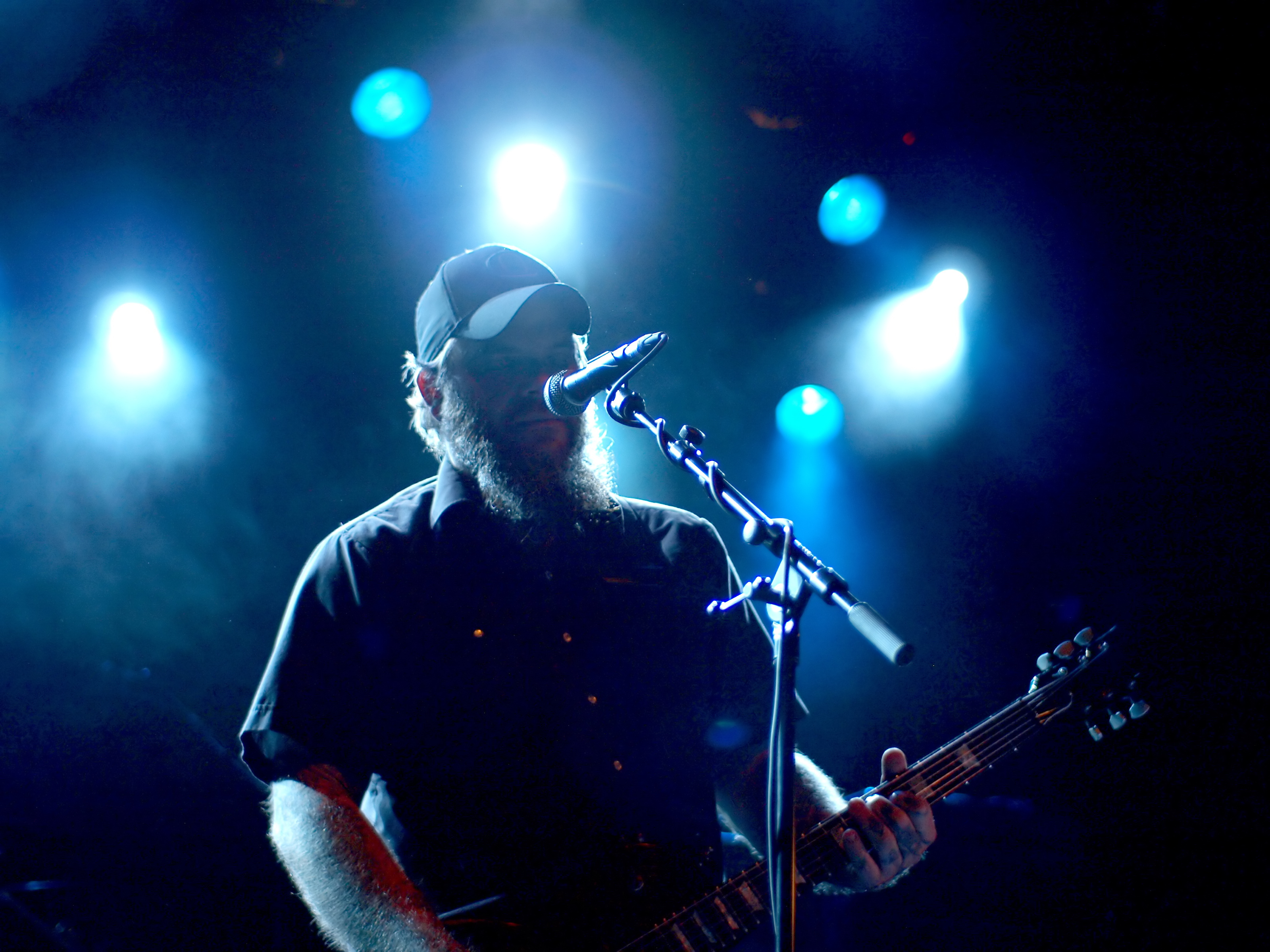
Kelly performing in 2009

Neurosis

- Pain of Mind (1987)
- Aberration (EP) (1989)
- The Word as Law (1990)
- Souls at Zero (1992)
- Enemy of the Sun (1993)
- Through Silver in Blood (1996)
- Times of Grace (1999)
- Sovereign (EP) (2000)
- A Sun That Never Sets (2001)
- The Eye of Every Storm (2004)
- Given to the Rising (2007)
- Honor Found in Decay (2012)
- Fires Within Fires (2016)

Neurosis & Jarboe

- Neurosis & Jarboe (2003)

Tribes of Neurot

- Rebegin (1995)
- Silver Blood Transmission (1995)
- Static Migration (1998)
- Grace (1999)
- 60° (2000)
- Adaptation and Survival: The Insect Project (2002)
- Cairn (2002)
- Meridian (2005)

Solo albums

- Spirit Bound Flesh (2001)
- The Wake (2008)
- The Forgiven Ghost in Me (2012)

Blood and Time

- At the Foot of the Garden (2003)
- Latitudes (2007)

Shrinebuilder

- Shrinebuilder (2009)

Corrections House

- Hoax the System / Grin with a Purpose (7") (2013)
- Last City Zero (2013)
- Know How to Carry a Whip (2015)

Mastodon (guest vocals)

- Leviathan (on "Aqua Dementia") (2004)
- Blood Mountain (on "Crystal Skull") (2006)
- Crack the Skye (on "Crack the Skye") (2009)
- The Hunter (on "Spectrelight") (2011)
- Once More 'Round the Sun (on "Diamond in the Witch House") (2014)
- Emperor of Sand (on "Scorpion Breath") (2017)
- Medium Rarities (on "Fallen Torches") (2020)

Mirrors for Psychic Warfare

- Mirrors for Psychic Warfare (2016)
- I See What I Became (2018)

Absent in Body

- The Abyss Stares Back - Vol. V (EP) (2017)
- Plague God (2022)
