= Times of Grace (album) =

1999 album by Neurosis

Studio album by Neurosis
- Released: May 4, 1999
- Recorded: October−November 1998
- Studios: Electrical Audio in Chicago and Mr. Toad's in San Francisco
- Genres: Post-metal; sludge metal; doom metal
- Length: 66:07
- Label: Relapse
- Producers: Steve Albini; Neurosis

Neurosis chronology
Through Silver in Blood (1996)	Times of Grace (1999)	Sovereign (2000)

Reissue artwork

Times of Grace is the sixth studio album by American post-metal band Neurosis, released on May 4, 1999 through Relapse Records. It continued the band's development of the post-metal genre and demonstrates gothic rock and progressive rock influences. This album and Grace, an ambient companion by the band's alter-ego Tribes of Neurot, are designed to play alongside each other. Times of Grace marked the beginning of the band's long lasting working relationship with recording engineer Steve Albini.

The album has received acclaim since its release, and is regarded as one of the best releases in Neurosis' discography, sometimes even exceeding the praise given to its predecessor, Through Silver in Blood.

== Background and composition ==
In 1996, Neurosis released Through Silver in Blood to critical and popular acclaim. Following extensive touring, the band returned to the studio in October 1998 to begin Times of Grace. As the band's debut release featuring the production of Steve Albini, who would become a regular Neurosis collaborator, Times of Grace has been called "the first album where Neurosis started to sound like Neurosis." Numerous publications praised Albini's work on the album, highlighting the weight and immersion of the production. The album has a natural and unrefined sound, and Albini's work both preserved and accentuated that organic quality.

== Critical reception ==
Professional ratings
Review scores
Source	Rating
AllMusic	4/5 stars
NME	7/10
OndaRock	7/10
Rock Hard	8.5/10

Times of Grace received positive reviews. AllMusic writer Eduardo Rivadavia praised the album, saying, "With time and patience, Times of Grace may prove one of the group's most satisfying works for long-time converts, but it will most likely seem too exhausting to the uninitiated." Writing for The A.V. Club, Joshua Klein highly appreciated the work of Steve Albini, who gave a good sound quality to the album, but even higher he appreciated the Neurosis musicians themselves, who had done hard work with the "labyrinthine arrangements". Greg Moffitt of the BBC wrote, "Replete with heaviness every bit as devastating as its belligerent brother, this album’s effortless ebb and flow and kaleidoscopic spectrum of eerie tones lend it a dazzling, cinematic quality." Stereogum ranked Times of Grace as Neurosis's best album, calling it "very, very heavy."

Since its release, the album has been acclaimed as one of, if not the best release in Neurosis' discography, being ranked No. 1 out of Neurosis' first 11 albums by Loudwire and Stereogum, who wrote, "Times Of Grace captures a visionary band at the height of its powers and blessed with a unity of purpose. The divisions between instruments, voices, and songs fall away, and Neurosis acts as a single, cosmic force. It is very, very heavy."

=== Accolades ===
Year	Publication	Country	Accolade	Rank
2012	Stereogum	United States	"The Top 20 Steve Albini-Produced Albums"	10
2018	Loudwire	United States	"The Best Metal Album from 40 Subgenres"	*
2021	Metal Hammer	United Kingdom	"The Top 20 Best Metal Albums of 1999"	*
"*" denotes an unordered list.

== Track listing ==
All tracks are written by Steve Von Till and Dave Edwardson, except where noted.

No.	Title	Writer(s)	Length
1.	"Suspended in Light"		1:59
2.	"The Doorway"	Von Till, Edwardson, Scott Kelly, Jason Roeder, Noah Landis	7:35
3.	"Under the Surface"		8:37
4.	"The Last You'll Know"		9:14
5.	"Belief"		5:56
6.	"Exist"		1:41
7.	"End of the Harvest"		7:29
8.	"Descent"		2:57
9.	"Away"		9:35
10.	"Times of Grace"		7:22
11.	"The Road to Sovereignty"		3:39
Total length:			66:07

Japanese bonus track
No.	Title	Length
12.	"Threshold"	3:25
Total length:		69:32

== Personnel ==
Neurosis

- Scott Kelly − guitar, vocals, percussion
- Steve Von Till − guitar, vocals, percussion
- Dave Edwardson − bass, backing vocals, Moog synthesizer
- Jason Roeder − drums, percussion
- Noah Landis − keyboard, samples, synthesizer, vocals
- Pete Inc. − live visual media

Additional musicians

- John Goff − bagpipes
- Jackie Gratz − cello
- Jon Birdsong − cornet, tuba
- Wendy-O Matik − narrator
- Johannes Mager − trombone
- Kris Force − viola, violin

== Grace ==
Grace

Studio album by Tribes of Neurot
- Released: July 13, 1999
- Studios: Neurot Mobile; Seismic Seance in San Francisco (mixing and mastering)
- Genres: Dark ambient; experimental
- Length: 66:07
- Labels: Neurot Recordings; Relapse
- Producers: Brian Jackson; Tribes of Neurot

Tribes of Neurot chronology
Static Migration (1998)	Grace (1999)	Adaptation and Survival (2002)

LP artwork

Grace is the third studio album by Californian dark ambient band Tribes of Neurot, a side project of Neurosis. Created at the same time as Times of Grace by the same people, the two albums are overlapping companions meant to be played simultaneously. In 2009, Neurot Recordings released Times of Grace and Grace as one 2xCD package.

=== Background and composition ===
From its inception, Grace was intended to be played alongside the 1999 Neurosis album Times of Grace. About this simultaneity, the band wrote:

"This recording by Tribes of Neurot is the companion disc to the Neurosis Times of Grace CD. Grace is sonically designed to be played simultaneously with the Neurosis disc. Alone, it possesses the same dynamic flow, fundamental texture and emotional impact as Times of Grace. Played together, these recordings create a unique multi-dimensional sound experience."

Grace is composed mainly of sounds from Times of Grace that have been manipulated and distorted to preserve the original's tone while offering a new, more ambient take. The album features sound effects and samples of dialogue placed in such a way that they interact with key moments from Times of Grace. The band encourages listeners to "experiment with different sources, different spaces, different speaker placement, and different volume relationships to bring an added dimension of life and spontaneity to the standard of passive stereo listening." Unlike Times of Grace, Grace was a largely solo endeavor for the band, receiving no production assistance from Steve Albini.

Some publications drew comparison between Grace and Zaireeka by The Flaming Lips, although another Tribes of Neurot album, Cairn, is much closer.

=== Critical reception ===
Professional ratings
Review scores
Source	Rating
AllMusic	3/5 stars
Metal Hammer	8/10 (Grace); 9/10 (Grace + Times of Grace)

Grace received mostly positive reviews, with some publications saying it can even be listened to by itself. AllMusic writer Steve Huey wrote, "It functions better as background music than as intense listening; for full attention, it's better combined with Times of Grace. Taking the two together underlines the ambition of the project more effectively, and it's a more active and interesting experience." Writing for the BBC, Greg Moffitt said, "Grace itself makes for interesting if uneasy listening; together, the effect can be mind-blowing. It’s a journey that leaves the listener drained."

=== Track listing ===
No.	Title	Length
1.	"Untitled"	1:59
2.	"Untitled"	7:35
3.	"Untitled"	8:37
4.	"Untitled"	9:14
5.	"Untitled"	5:56
6.	"Untitled"	1:41
7.	"Untitled"	7:29
8.	"Untitled"	2:57
9.	"Untitled"	9:35
10.	"Untitled"	7:22
11.	"Untitled"	3:39
Total length:		66:07

Note

- Original physical releases of Grace left the tracks untitled, but the digital reissue provides the word "Grace" followed by a number and the title of the corresponding song from Times of Grace. For example, track 8 is called "Grace 8 (Descent)".

=== Personnel ===
Tribes of Neurot

- Scott Kelly
- Steve Von Till
- Dave Edwardson
- Jason Roeder
- Noah Landis

Technical personnel

- Brian Jackson − engineering, mixing, mastering
- Dave Clark − mixing
- Dustin Donaldson − mixing
