= Neurosis (band) =

American post-metal band

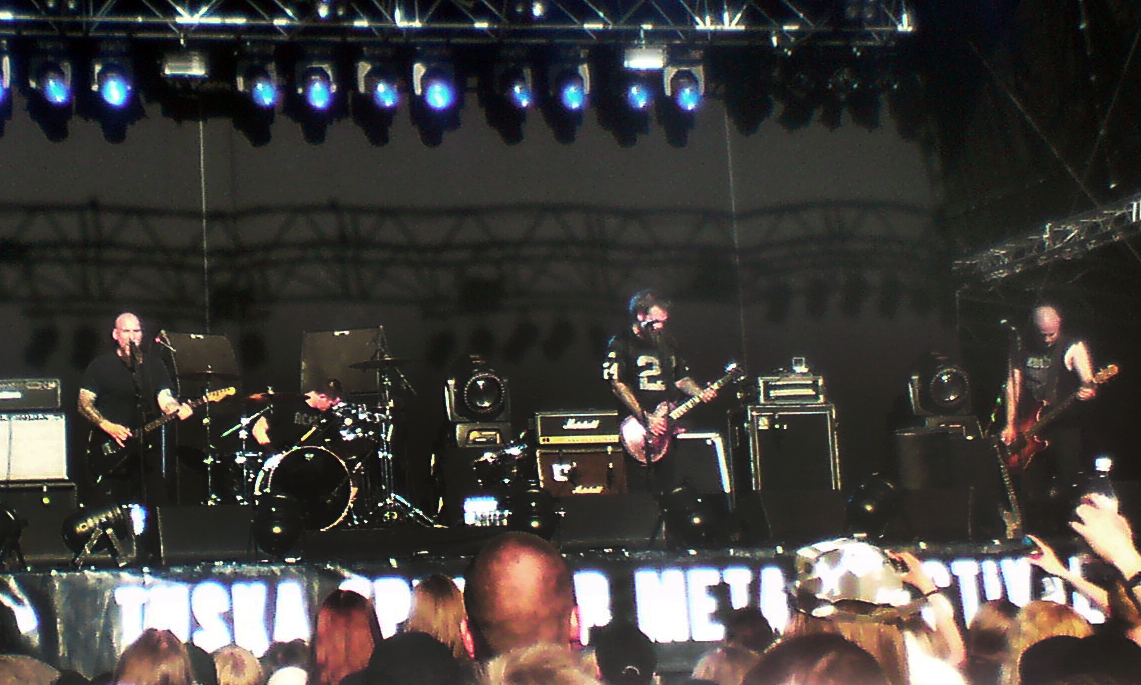
- Neurosis at Tuska Open Air Metal Festival 2009

Background information
- Origin: Oakland, California, U.S.
- Genres: Post-metal; sludge metal; crust punk (early)
- Years active: 1985–present (hiatus: 2019–2024)
- Labels: Neurot; Relapse; Alternative Tentacles; Lookout!; Alchemy; Your Choice
- Spinoffs: Tribes of Neurot
- Members: Dave Edwardson; Jason Roeder; Steve Von Till; Noah Landis; Aaron Turner
- Past members: Scott Kelly; Chad Salter; Pete Rypins; Simon McIlroy; Adam Kendall; Pete Inc.; Josh Graham
- Website: neurosis.com

Neurosis is an American post-metal band from Oakland, California. It was formed in 1985 by guitarist Scott Kelly, bassist Dave Edwardson, and drummer Jason Roeder, initially as a crust punk band. Chad Salter joined as a second guitarist and appeared on the band's 1987 debut Pain of Mind, and then Steve Von Till replaced him in 1989. The following year, the lineup further expanded to include a keyboardist and a visual artist. Beginning with their third album Souls at Zero (1992), Neurosis transformed their hardcore sound by incorporating diverse influences including doom metal and industrial music, becoming a major force in the emergence of the post-metal and sludge metal genres.

The band's lineup stabilized in 1995 with the addition of Noah Landis, who replaced Simon McIlroy on keyboards and electronics. That same year they formed the experimental music group Tribes of Neurot and in 1999 the record label Neurot Recordings. This line-up remained stable until 2019, when the band parted ways with Kelly after discovering his history of domestic violence against his family, though this would not come to light until August 2022 out of respect for the privacy of Kelly's family members. Kelly's firing left the band in hiatus until 2026, with the addition of vocalist/guitarist Aaron Turner (formerly of Isis) and the surprise release of their twelfth album An Undying Love for a Burning World in March of that year.

Neurosis have garnered critical recognition over the course of their 12 studio albums. The BBC credited them with taking "heavy music to previously unimaginable spaces ... [and shaping] metal's definitive response to the 21st century."

== History ==
=== Formation and early years (1985–1995) ===
In December 1985, Scott Kelly (guitar/vocals), Dave Edwardson (bass/vocals), and Jason Roeder (drums), formerly members of Violent Coercion, founded Neurosis as a hardcore punk outfit, inspired also by British crust punk in the vein of Amebix. The name came from the intro song "Neurosis/Faith or Fraud" by Violent Coercion.

The band released their first demo tape in July 1986.

In January 1987, Chad Salter was added on second guitar and vocals. In June 1987 Neurosis signed to Alchemy Records/Southern Studios, and the band's debut LP, "Pain of Mind", released in December 1987. Artwork for the record was done by Jason B. Storey, former vocalist of Violent Coercion.

In December 1988 guitarist/vocalist Chad Salter left the band and was replaced by the band's roadie, Pete Rypins.

In January 1989 Neurosis released 3-song EP "Aberration" on Lookout! Records and went on 6-week US tour from January to February 1989. After the tour in March 1989 Pete left and was replaced by Steve Von Till, who previously played in bands Transgressor, Peace Test and Tribe of Resistance. During the December 1989 the band recorded their next album, and in February 1990 "The Word as Law" was released via Lookout! Records. From June to August 1990 Neurosis went on 10 week tour through the US, Canada, and Mexico. Also in June 1990 "Empty" live EP was released via Allied Recordings.

In April 1991, Simon McIlroy joined the band as a synthesizer/sampler player with Adam Kendall as a visual artist (Adam and Simon have been friends since they were teenagers and they were doing a lot of experimental music together before). Adam Kendall helped built the initial visual setup for the band, collecting and compiling imagery and was the first to travel with the band, taking this out across the U.S. and Europe. At this point, keyboardist Simon McIlroy also began contributing to developing the band's visuals. He previously did different psychedelic visuals with a similar setup for underground raves, and while the imagery was completely different, the band interacted with other experienced visual artists which allowed Neurosis to borrow and steal techniques that were helpful.

In May 1990 "The Word as Law" was re-released on CD with bonus tracks. With The Word as Law, Neurosis began to transition from the rapid-fire hardcore punk of "Pain of Mind" to the more experimental sound of "Souls at Zero", which featured slower tempos, unorthodox song structures, and guest performers on instruments like trumpet, violin and flute. The album would ultimately prove critical in the development of the post-metal genre.

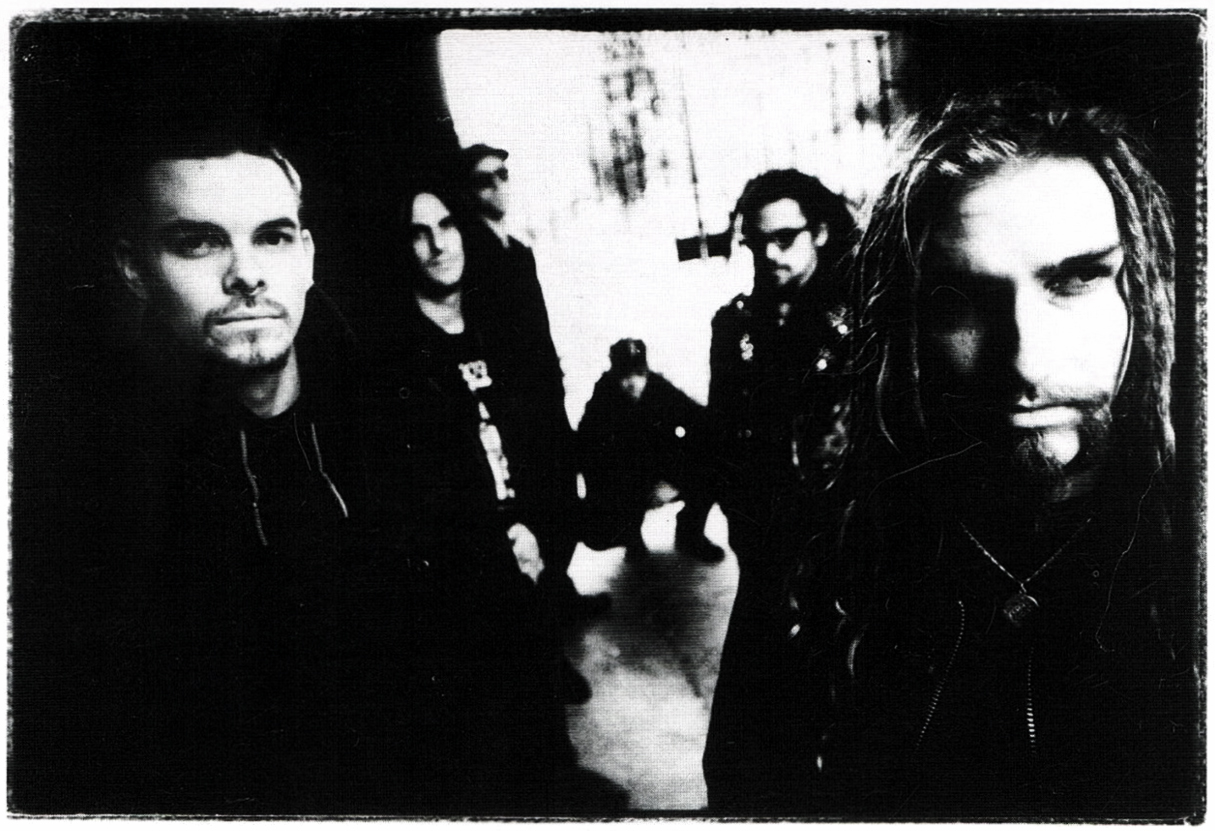
1992 promotional photo

In October 1991 Neurosis signed to Alternative Tentacles, and a four-song demo for the upcoming album was recorded. In February–March 1992 the band recorded next album, and on May 19, 1992 "Souls at Zero" was released.

Next album "Enemy of the Sun" was released on August 17, 1993, also via Alternative Tentacles. Neurosis' signature sound came into full force with this recording, with The Quietus observing that "at the time few could have predicted this black hole of agonizingly precise metal riffs, unnerving backmasking, industrial folkisms and extensive sampling". The band went on another big tour to promote the recording.

In early 1995, right after the tour, Noah Landis, a childhood friend of Dave Edwardson, replaced Simon McIlroy as a keyboardist.

=== Through Silver in Blood to The Eye of Every Storm (1996–2004) ===
In 1996, Neurosis attracted mainstream attention with its Relapse Records debut, Through Silver in Blood and subsequent tour with Pantera. In 1999, Neurosis released Times of Grace, which was designed to be played synchronously with Grace, an album released by Neurosis' ambient side project, Tribes of Neurot.

In the early 2000s, the band founded their own independent record label, Neurot Recordings, which, in addition to releasing material from Neurosis and its associated projects, signed several other artists.

Beginning with A Sun That Never Sets, Neurosis began incorporating clean vocals and acoustic instrumentation with a growing folk music influence, more noted presence of classical string instruments (which had been used sparsely since Souls At Zero) as well as slower tempos and a more contemplative sound. Allmusic described this change as an "aesthetic sea change". 2004's The Eye of Every Storm expanded upon this change by incorporating more ambient textures into the mix and presenting a softer post-rock oriented sound.

=== Given to the Rising, Honor Found in Decay, Fires Within Fires (2007–2019) ===
The band released their ninth studio album Given to the Rising on May 8, 2007, through Neurot Records. On this album Neurosis re-incorporated a more aggressive approach into their music once again, and the album was well received by critics.

The band entered the studio in December 2011 to record the follow-up to Given to the Rising. The new album, entitled Honor Found in Decay, was released in late October 2012.

The band performed at Roadburn 2016, with Brooklyn Vegan's Ian Cory writing that "once the house lights came up it was hard to justify watching anything else." This was part of their series of shows performed in celebration of their 30th anniversary as a band.

On May 5, 2016, Relapse Records confirmed they were reissuing A Sun That Never Sets and The Eye of Every Storm on vinyl on June 17 with new artwork.

On August 1, 2016, the band released a teaser trailer for their upcoming album online. Their eleventh studio album, titled Fires Within Fires, was released on September 23, 2016.

=== Scott Kelly's dismissal and hiatus (2019–2026) ===
Following a Facebook post confessing to allegations of abuse towards his wife and family, Scott Kelly retired from music and public life in August 2022. According to a statement released by the band's Facebook page the next day, Kelly had been quietly expelled from the group in late 2019 when his bandmates discovered the extent of his abuse and domestic violence. The band never made any prior formal announcements regarding this "out of respect for [Kelly's] wife's direct request for privacy, and to honor the family's wish not to let their experience become gossip in a music magazine." In the post, the band condemned Kelly's abuse and described being filled with "disgust and disappointment" towards "a man who we once called Brother". During this hiatus, there was no announcement or info on whether or not the band will continue or disband, as "in due course, when it's appropriate, we will provide more information about our future musical endeavors, but that time is not now."

In January 2025, drummer Jason Roeder announced on his social media pages that he would no longer be touring and he intended to sell most, if not all, of his musical equipment. In a follow-up post, Roeder denied he was retiring from music altogether, and further stated: "As far as Neurosis goes - I don't know. The remaining members are truly amazing people and with or without me I am sure they will continue to do mind-blowing work, whatever form it takes."

=== End of hiatus and addition of Aaron Turner (2026–present) ===
On March 20, 2026, the band surprise-released their 12th studio album, An Undying Love for a Burning World, and announced the addition of vocalist/guitarist Aaron Turner, best known for bands such as Isis and Sumac, who began rehearsing with the band in April 2024. On that same day, the band announced their first show in seven years at the Fire in the Mountains festival in Montana. The band clarified that their return was "not a reunion" because they "never broke up."

== Visuals ==
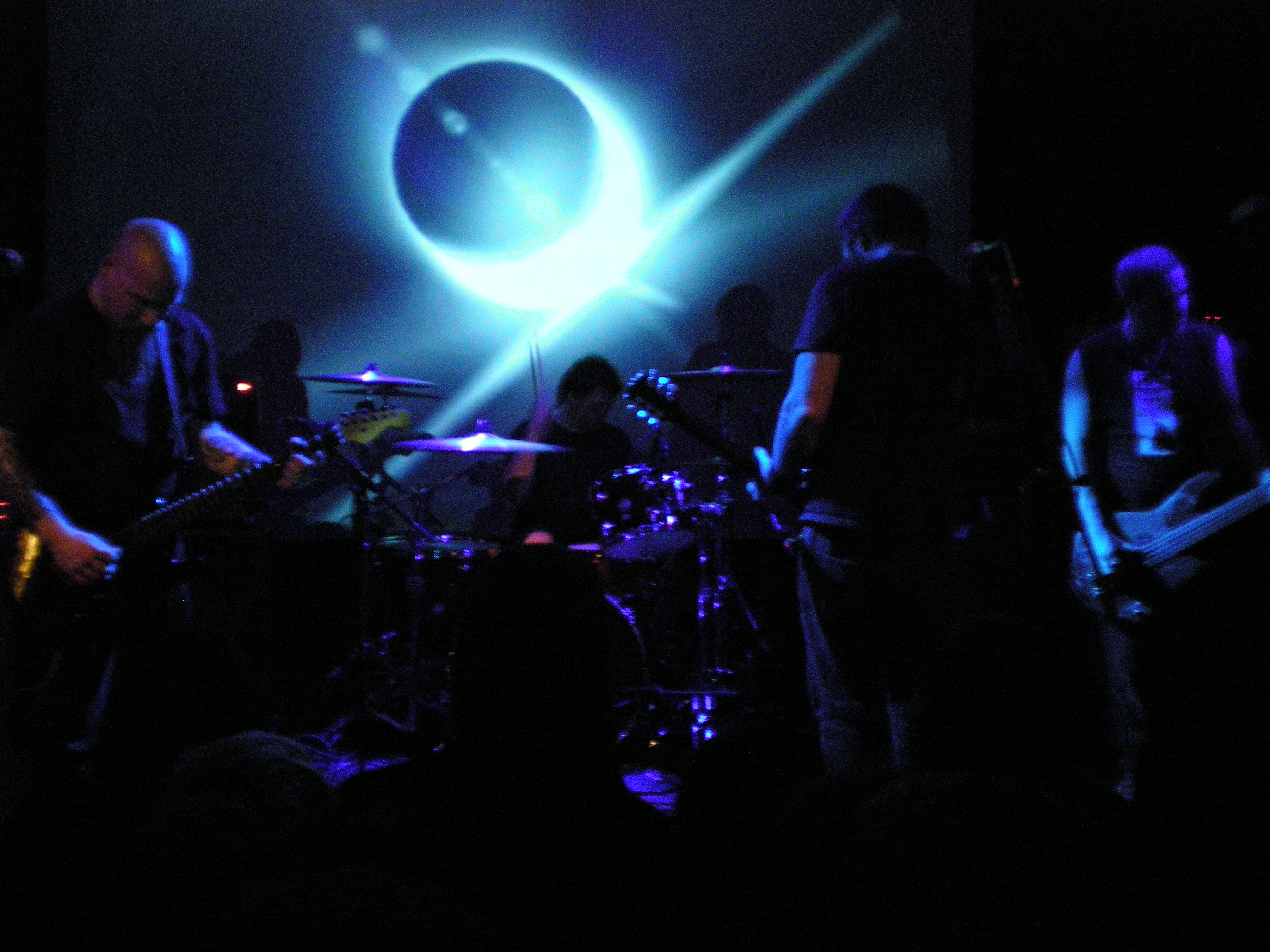
Neurosis live in 2008

From 1991 to 1993, Adam G. Kendall was recruited to create visuals and perform live with the band. At this point, keyboardist Simon McIlroy also began contributing to developing the band's visuals. Following Adam Kendall's departure from touring, Pete Inc. took over the job, although Kendall continued to contribute visuals for the band until as late as 1997. Kendall also shot the footage for the "Locust Star" video.

Josh Graham took over live visuals in 2000 as Pete wasn't "cutting the mustard" (in the words of Steve Von Till), and created album artwork for 2004's The Eye of Every Storm, 2007's Given to the Rising, and 2012's Honor Found in Decay, as well as re-designs for the reissues of Souls at Zero and Enemy of the Sun. Graham and Neurosis amicably parted ways in late November 2012 via an announcement on the band website. He was not replaced and the band ceased to use live visual media.

Often experimental and psychedelic in nature, Neurosis' visual media have added to the reputation of their live performances. Many of the visuals for their tours supporting Through Silver in Blood are taken from Ken Russell's film Altered States. Other images are included in the enhanced portion of the Sovereign EP, and on the A Sun That Never Sets DVD video release. The majority of the DVD release was directed by Graham, with an additional video by Chad Rullman.

== Musical style and influences ==
Neurosis formed as a hardcore punk band, performing a blend of hardcore and heavy metal inspired by British punk and described as crust punk or crossover. The band are credited as pioneers of crust punk in the United States. Already their second album The Word as Law (1990) incorporated avant-garde music and sludge metal, a genre marrying the ferocity of hardcore and the deep heaviness of doom metal. Thereafter, the band developed their trademark sound that has been described as a "blend of earth-quaking riffs, nervy hardcore menace and ritualistic dark ambience." Greg Moffitt of the BBC wrote that through a "process of evolution and refinement" beginning with their third album Souls at Zero (1992) and culminating in their fifth, Through Silver in Blood (1996), they "[took] heavy music to previously unimaginable spaces and, in the process, shape[d] what has thus far been metal's definitive response to the 21st century."

The style Neurosis pioneered has been named post-metal, an "expansive, progressive and often apocalyptic" sound, "adding alien sounds, oddball instrumentation and atmospheric depth to [the] viscerally crushing approach" of sludge metal. Their sound has also been described as experimental/avant-garde metal, doom metal, post-hardcore, industrial metal, drone metal, stoner metal, psychedelic metal, progressive metal, alternative metal, art metal, and extreme metal, and as employing elements of folk. Steve Huey of AllMusic called it sludge infused with industrial, metal, and alternative rock, while Kory Grow of Rolling Stone called it a mix of "metal, punk, sludge and avant-garde experiments."

When asked what the band's influences are in a 2000 interview, Scott Kelly stated: "Mainly ourselves at this point, but our foundation ranges through Black Flag, Pink Floyd, Die Kreuzen, Amebix, Jimi Hendrix, King Crimson, The Melvins, Celtic Frost and, of course, Hank Williams." In other interviews, members of the band also listed Throbbing Gristle, Joy Division, Black Sabbath, Crass, Voivod, Loop, Godflesh, Swans, and Townes Van Zandt as influences. In 2007, Steve Von Till stated that lyrically he and Kelly are inspired by literature, alluding to writers such as Cormac McCarthy, Jack London, and Paul Bowles.

In an interview with The Guardian in 2016, the band cited the British anarcho-punk bands of the early 80s "rife with bitterness, rage and fear, but also possessed of a desire to experiment with punk rock’s parameters, be they sonic, visual or ideological" as being a collective influence, including Flux of Pink Indians, Oi Polloi, Icons of Filth, Amebix, Discharge, Subhumans, Rudimentary Peni, Crass and Chumbawamba. Other artists of other genres were also mentioned such as Killing Joke Swans, Skullflower, Hawkwind and Townes Van Zandt.

Some commentators note that both sonically and lyrically, Neurosis convey an intense emotional-spiritual effect. There is a mythical aspect to their imagery or a ritual aspect to their performance. Brandon Geist of Revolver relates that "Kelly and Von Till ... speak about their band in bold, quasi-religious, 'honor and glory'–type language. Words like commitment, sacrifice, surrender, and spirit come up a lot."

Many bands and artists have cited Neurosis as an important inspiration, including Rorschach, Born Against, Converge, Machine Head, Slipknot, Agalloch, Yob, Isis, Mastodon, Amenra, Kylesa, Pelican, Wolves in the Throne Room, Cobalt, Withered, Baroness, Oathbreaker, Chelsea Wolfe, Pallbearer, Full of Hell and Baptists. Their influence echoes through acts that have defined the post-metal genre, such as Isis, Boris, Agalloch, Amenra, Pelican, and Deafheaven.

== Members ==
=== Current lineup ===
- Dave Edwardson — bass (1985–present), vocals (1985–1997, 2026–present), backing vocals (1992–present), Moog synthesizer (1998–1999, 2003–2004), effects ("space") (2003–2004)
- Jason Roeder — drums (1985–2025, 2025–present), percussion (1993–2025, 2025–present)
- Steve Von Till — guitar, vocals (1989–present), percussion (1993–2000), sounds ("filters & textures") (2003–2004)
- Noah Landis — keyboards, synthesizers, effects, programming, samples, sounds (1995–present), backing vocals (1998–2000, 2006–present)
- Aaron Turner — guitar, vocals (2024–present)

=== Former members ===
- Scott Kelly — vocals, guitar (1985–2019), percussion (1993–2000)
- Chad Salter — guitar, backing vocals (1987–1988)
- Pete Rypins — guitar (1988–1989)
- Simon McIlroy — keyboards, synthesizers, samples, programming, production, backing vocals (1991–1995), visual art (1991–1993)
- Adam Kendall — visual art (1991–1993)
- Pete Inc. — visual art (1993–2000), additional percussion (1993–2000)
- Josh Graham — visual art (2000–2012)

=== Technical personnel ===
- Dave Clark — live sound engineer (1996–present)

=== Former technical personnel ===
- Pete Rypins — roadie, driver (1988–1989), live sound engineer (1988–1989), guitar (1988–1989)
- Pete the Roadie — roadie, road crew (?–?)
- Paula Hibbs-Rines (aka Mrs. Roadie) — roadie (?–?)
- Damon Kelly — stage technician (?–?)
- Domenic Seita — stage technician (?–?)

== Discography ==
Studio albums

- Pain of Mind (1987)
- The Word as Law (1990)
- Souls at Zero (1992)
- Enemy of the Sun (1993)
- Through Silver in Blood (1996)
- Times of Grace (1999)
- Sovereign (2000) (Note: Released as a mini-album.)
- A Sun That Never Sets (2001)
- Neurosis & Jarboe (2003) (Note: Released as a collaboration album with Jarboe.)
- The Eye of Every Storm (2004)
- Given to the Rising (2007)
- Honor Found in Decay (2012)
- Fires Within Fires (2016)
- An Undying Love for a Burning World (2026)

== Side projects ==
- Tribes of Neurot - The "alter ego" of Neurosis; a collective of musicians that create dark ambient and noise music.
- Blood and Time - An acoustic side project of Neurosis with apocalyptic folk overtones featuring Josh Graham, Noah Landis and Scott Kelly.
- Culper Ring - A brief side project of Neurosis experimenting with dark ambient and industrial music featuring Steve Von Till.
- Red Sparowes - A group formerly featuring Josh Graham, as he departed the group early 2008.
- A Storm of Light - A heavy/drone/experimental/rock band featuring Josh Graham.
- Battle of Mice - A post hardcore band featuring Josh Graham.
- Harvestman - an ambient/industrial side band featuring Steve Von Till.
- Violent Coercion - pre-Neurosis Hardcore/punk band with Scott Kelly on guitar, Dave Edwardson on bass and Jason Roeder on drums.
- Jesus Fucking Christ - A heavy punk/thrash band reminiscent of Pain of Mind-era Neurosis featuring Dave Edwardson on bass and vocals.
- Kicker - A '77 punk/UK82 band featuring Dave Edwardson on bass and Pete the Roadie, former Neurosis roadie, on vocals.
- Shrinebuilder - A stoner metal "super group" featuring Scott Kelly.
- Corrections House - A drone/doom/experimental "super group" featuring Scott Kelly.
- Mirrors For Psychic Warfare - An experimental noise project featuring Scott Kelly.
- Sleep - A Doom Metal Band featuring Jason Roeder
- High Tone Son of a Bitch - A Bay Area psychedelic stoner / doom collective featuring multiple contributions from Dave Edwardson on synthesizer.
