= Neurot Recordings =

American rock music record label

- Founded: 1999
- Founder: Members of Neurosis
- Distributors: Revolver USA, Southern Records
- Genre: Rock, experimental, heavy metal, hardcore punk
- Country of origin: U.S.
- Official website: www.neurotrecordings.com

Neurot Recordings is an American independent record label founded by members of avant-garde metal band Neurosis in 1999. Gradually expanding, it has showcased a variety of artists including a number of sludge metal, post-rock, and noise bands.

== Bands ==
- A Storm of Light
- Across Tundras
- Akimbo
- Amber Asylum
- Amenra
- Battle of Mice
- Bee & Flower
- Christ on Parade
- Current 93
- Enablers
- FINAL
- Galloping Coroners
- Grails
- Guapo
- Harvestman
- House of Low Culture
- Isis
- Scott Kelly
- KK Null
- Lotus Eaters
- Made Out of Babies
- Neurosis
- OM
- Oxbow
- Red Sparowes
- Savage Republic
- Shrinebuilder
- Skullflower
- Tarantel
- Tone
- Tribes of Neurot
- U.S. Christmas
- Ufomammut
- Steve Von Till
- Yob
- Zeni Geva

== See also ==
- List of record labels
