= Post-metal =

Genre of heavy metal music

- Other names: Art metal; metalgaze Atmospheric sludge metal
- Stylistic origins: Sludge metal; doom metal; experimental; post-rock; progressive rock; post-hardcore
- Cultural origins: 1990s, United States and England
- Typical instruments: Electric guitar; bass; drums
- Derivative forms: Blackgaze

Other topics
- Alternative metal; avant-garde metal; black metal; doom metal; drone metal; industrial metal; progressive metal; shoegaze; sludge metal

Post-metal is a music genre rooted in heavy metal but exploring approaches beyond metal conventions. It emerged in the 1990s with bands such as Neurosis and Godflesh, who transformed metal texture through experimental composition. In a way similar to the predecessor genres post-rock and post-hardcore, post-metal offsets the darkness and intensity of extreme metal with an emphasis on atmosphere, emotion, and even "revelation", developing an expansive but introspective sound variously imbued with elements of ambient, noise, psychedelic, progressive, and classical music, and often shoegaze and art rock. Songs are typically long, with loose and layered structures that discard the verse–chorus form in favor of crescendos and repeating themes. The sound centres on guitars (subjected to various effects) and drums, while any vocals are often but not always screamed or growled and resemble an additional instrument.

Post-metal is related to other experimental styles of metal: avant-garde metal, drone metal, progressive metal, and industrial metal. It has also been called metalgaze and art metal, highlighting its connection to shoegaze (an indie music style related to post-rock) and art music, respectively. Contemporary post-metal, pioneered by diverse groups such as Isis, Agalloch, Boris, Pelican, Jesu, Wolves in the Throne Room, and Russian Circles, typically employs the deep heaviness of doom metal and sludge metal and/or the dark ferocity of black metal. The widespread acclaim of Deafheaven, who succeeded Alcest in combining black metal and shoegaze (a fusion nicknamed blackgaze), made this global post-metal underground more visible.

== History ==
=== Predecessors ===
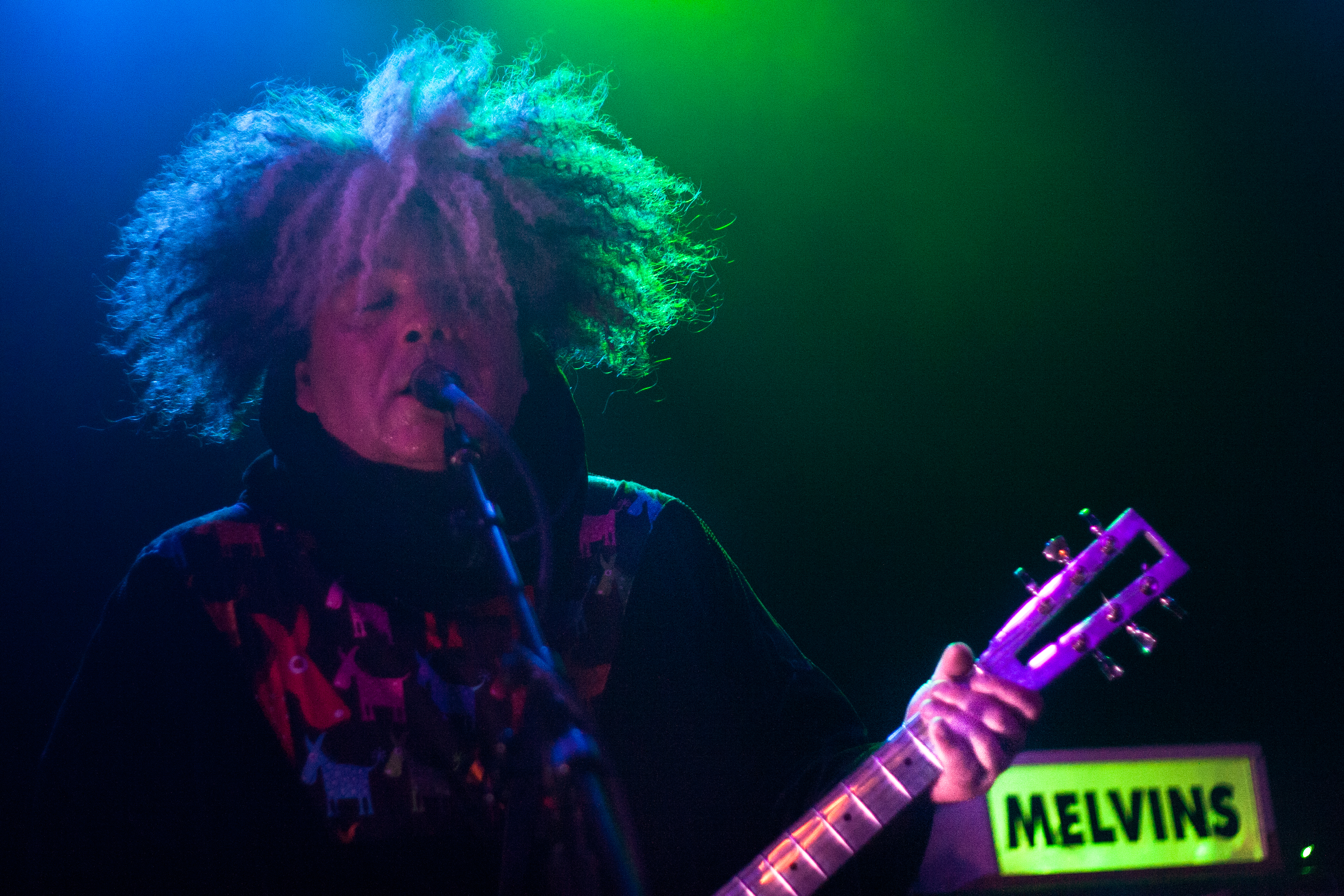
The Melvins' combination of doom metal, hardcore punk, and avant-garde approaches has been a key influence on post-metal bands.

The groundwork for post-metal was laid in the 1980s and early 1990s by various artists (mostly in the US) combining heavy metal and punk rock sounds with an "avant-garde sensibility", such as the Melvins (particularly on 1991's Bullhead), The Flying Luttenbachers, Justin Broadrick of Napalm Death and Godflesh, Swans, Gore, Last Exit, Glenn Branca, Rollins Band, and Fugazi. Helmet's albums Meantime (1992) and Betty (1994) were also significant, while Tool's music was described as post-metal as early as 1993. Many of these artists emerged from hardcore punk and post-punk circles but their combination of sonic violence with experimentation and eclecticism made them difficult to categorize under any one genre.

=== Emergence in the 1990s ===
The term post-rock was coined in 1994 and soon used to describe a diverse group of bands that shared "a penchant for drifting melodies and the desire to expand beyond established rock boundaries". As this movement swelled, bands from post-hardcore and experimental backgrounds began to incorporate its tendencies of "ambience, offbeat experimentation, downcast melodies and psychedelia" into metal. The two genres further converged through the influence of post-rock bands such as Mogwai, Godspeed You! Black Emperor, and Lift to Experience who shared metal's emphasis on loudness.

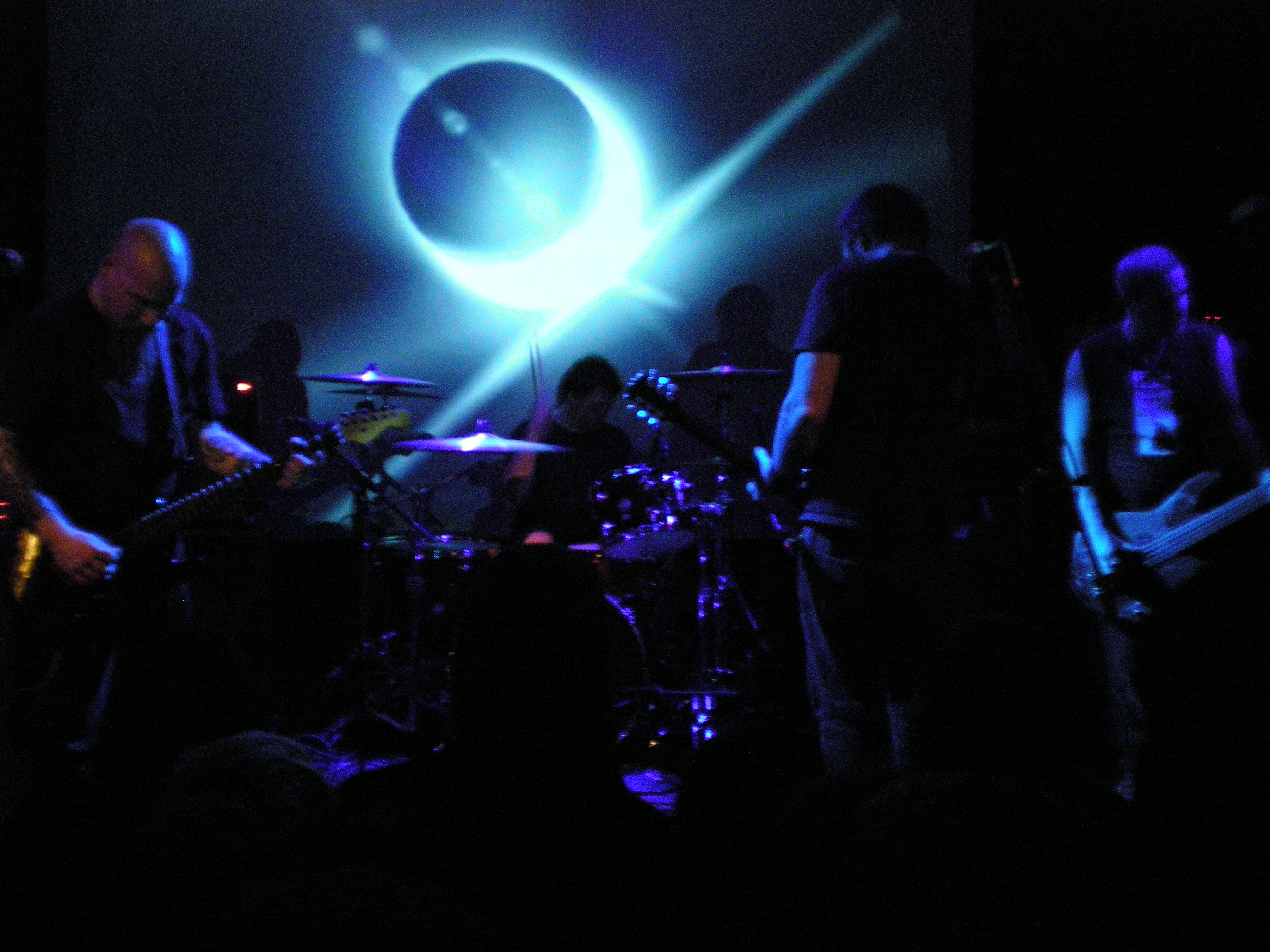
Neurosis have been credited with inventing the genre through their experimental, spiritually intense work.

Neurosis' third album Souls at Zero and Godflesh's second album Pure, both released in 1992, are often retrospectively considered the first post-metal records. Godflesh had already pioneered "sluggish and tortured" industrial metal of their 1989 debut Streetcleaner, but Pure showcased "more expansive structures and long stretches of billowing noise", inspiring a number of subsequent bands to combine metal with "layered washes of sound". Neurosis on the other hand were a hardcore band who embraced doom metal, post-punk and industrial influences, experimenting with texture and dynamics. They have since become recognized "for their pioneering post-metal efforts and unwavering dedication to expanding their artistic boundaries." In 2010, guitarist Steve Von Till stated:

We always knew there was something deep to Neurosis's music, but ... I think Souls at Zero was when the music became something else. It was taking that material out on the road and losing ourself in the trance states induced by playing hypnotic, super-heavy loud music that we really figured out how to surrender to it. Then we said, OK – this is going to take us to where we wanna go: somewhere deeper, somewhere more emotional, somewhere elemental.

The band's 1996 fifth album Through Silver in Blood was credited by Terrorizer with "effectively invent[ing] the post-metal genre" and named the best post-metal album of all time by Fact. The fluctuating 12-minute song "Purify" has been described as the album's "signature track". Neurosis' work has also contributed the development of doom metal, sludge metal, and drone metal, and these genres have been associated with post-metal since. Similarly, drone metal pioneers Earth have been significant to post-metal ever since their 1991 debut release Extra-Capsular Extraction.

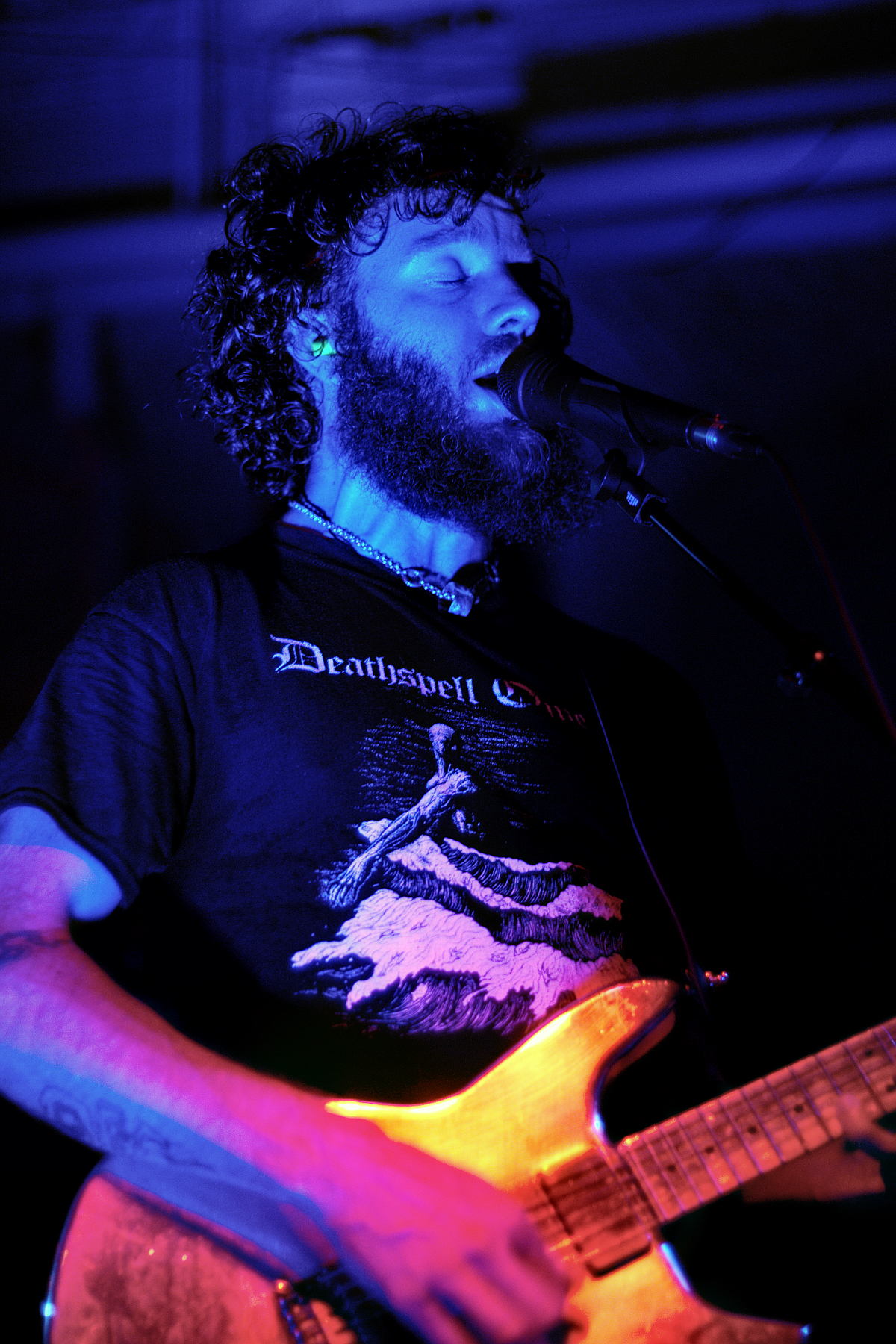
Aaron Turner of Isis and Hydra Head Records has been a major figure.

Furthermore, Fact writer Robin Jahdi highlights the late 1990s US noisecore of bands such as Botch, Kiss It Goodbye, the Dillinger Escape Plan and Coalesce, who merged brutal metallic hardcore with jazz into fast-and-complex compositions, as a fundamental influence on post-metal. Writing for Bandcamp Daily, Jon Wiederhorn also noted the significance of Botch and Cave In, while Converge have been connected to post-metal through their longer songs since the closing track of their seminal 2001 album Jane Doe. According to Jahdi, the genre emerged as "those young intellectuals decided to slow it down" and labels such as Relapse Records and Hydra Head Records began releasing "slower, more bass-heavy and abstract" music more akin to post-rock.

=== Development in the 2000s ===
Hydra Head Records had been established in 1993 by Aaron Turner. In 1997, Turner co-founded Isis, a band which became central to an increasingly recognizable post-metal movement. In particular, their 2002 album Oceanic – which showcased "buzzing washes of multilayered sound that ebbed and flowed in intensity", combining the "barbed guitars" and "shouted vocals" of post-hardcore with "meandering, psychedelic progressions" – has become regarded as a classic of the genre. At the same time, Hydra Head signed further prominent bands, releasing the early records of Pelican and Jesu. While Pelican are an instrumental quartet inspired as much by Neurosis and Godflesh as by Mogwai, Jesu was formed by Justin Broadrick after the breakup of Godflesh to explore "ambient guitar compositions", embracing shoegaze and slowcore influences. Rosetta also began around this time, playing a style of post-metal that incorporates elements of space rock and ambient music.

As black metal "spread beyond Scandinavia to infect the global underground", it joined shoegaze as a major factor in the evolution of post-metal. Many bands employ the "speed and ferocity" of black metal in "contrast to slower, more ethereal compositions". This approach was pioneered by Agalloch, who formed in 1995 and also employed elements of doom metal, progressive rock, folk music, and post-hardcore. Wolves in the Throne Room, who became a significant act for American black metal by the release of their 2007 album Two Hunters, were also inspired by Neurosis in combining "ambience and violence" to craft deeply melancholic music.

While all aforementioned post-metal pioneers are either from the US (Neurosis, Isis, Pelican, Agalloch, and Wolves in the Throne Room) or the UK (Broadrick's Godflesh and Jesu), the genre soon spread internationally. The Japanese band Boris, formed in 1992, "have always embraced the spirit and vitality of the vibrant movement" and some of their works, such as the 2005 albums Dronevil and Pink, have become influential to it. Boris often employ elements of drone music and have collaborated with prominent Seattle drone metal band Sunn O))), who have also been associated with post-metal. Several European bands also gained prominence within the genre, including: Cult of Luna from Sweden, whose sound is indebted to Isis' Oceanic; Amenra from Belgium, who signed to Neurosis' label Neurot Recordings and rival their predecessors in sheer spiritual intensity; and Year of No Light from France, who have transitioned from a sludge-oriented sound to monumental instrumental compositions, "beautifully layered, but still dark and heavy".

Back in the US, another instrumental band rose to prominence: Russian Circles, also strongly influenced by Oceanic. By contrast, True Widow, whose sound is rooted as much in 1990s indie rock and psychedelic rock as in doom metal, offer a distinctive take, most impactfully on the 2013's Circumambulation, by employing "male/female vocal interplay" and showcasing "vulnerability and restraint". Meanwhile, the Melvins returned to the sound they themselves helped inspire, impacting it with the 2004 album Pigs of the Roman Empire, a collaboration with Welsh dark ambient composer Lustmord.

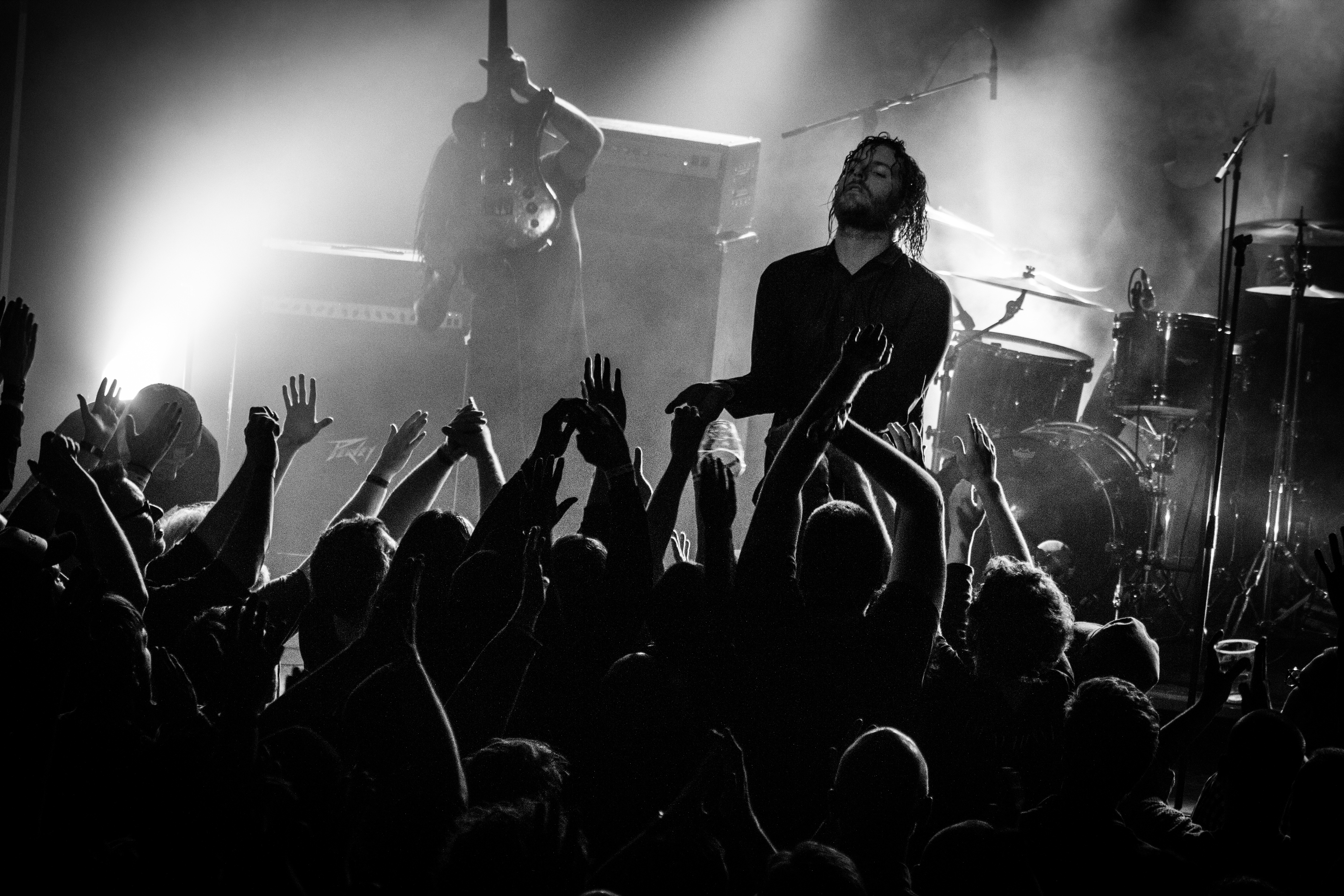
Deafheaven have brought the genre widespread critical acclaim in their fusion of black metal and shoegaze.

Gradually, post-metal as a genre has achieved major critical acclaim. This was reinforced by the "widely publicized" success of California band Deafheaven, whose second album Sunbather became one of the most celebrated releases of 2013. The band's successful fusion of caustic black metal with blissfull shoegaze in the vein of My Bloody Valentine and Slowdive, although preceded by the French musician Neige of Alcest, was nicknamed blackgaze and met with controversy among fans of conventional extreme metal. It has also inspired a new wave of bands such as: Ghost Bath from North Dakota, who use undistorted guitar melodies to develop unsettling atmospheres; Austria's Harakiri for the Sky, whose despairing sound melds black metal and post-hardcore; and the recent work of Oathbreaker, who are rooted in the Belgian dark hardcore scene of Amenra.

== Characteristics ==
Post-metal is generally heavy, aggressive, and dark, but explores a variety of musical approaches alien to conventional heavy metal and extreme metal. It mirrors post-rock and post-hardcore in its emphasis on atmosphere and deep emotion and may be considered abstract, introspective, expansive, hypnotic, progressive, layered, or even apocalyptic. Jon Wiederhorn writes that though some post-metal bands "sought to break away from their raging roots by exploring less bombastic and more dynamic musical techniques" and others "sought to remain raw and corrosive", their music shares a "heavy-lidded yet eye-opening" effect. The New York Times associated the term with a "wave of bands using metal as a jumping-off point for a range of experimental styles, dabbling in free jazz, minimalist post-rock, noise and even modern classical music." Contemporary post-metal bands incorporate influences ranging through doom metal, black metal, shoegaze, progressive rock, folk music, and classical music.

Writing for Slate in 2009, Simon Reynolds reflected:

Post-rock doesn't have the same temporal aspect that post-disco or post-punk have; it's not about the ripples set in motion by a galvanizing "event." Rather, it evokes a sense of "going beyond" the structures of a genre of music without completely abandoning its legacy of attitudes and assumptions. For similar reasons, the term post-metal seems increasingly useful to describe the vast and variegated swath of genres (the thousand flavors of doom/black/death/grind/drone/sludge/etc., ad infinitum) that emerged from the early '90s onward. Sometimes beat-free and ambient, increasingly the work of home-studio loners rather than performing bands, post-metal of the kind released by US labels like Hydra Head often seems to have barely any connection to metal as understood by, say, VH1 Classic doc-makers. The continuity is less sonic but attitudinal: the penchant for morbidity and darkness taken to a sometimes hokey degree; the somber clothing and the long hair; the harrowed, indecipherably growled vocals; the bombastically verbose lyrics/song titles/band names. It's that aesthetic rather than a way of riffing or a palette of guitar sounds that ties post-metal back to Judas Priest and Black Sabbath.

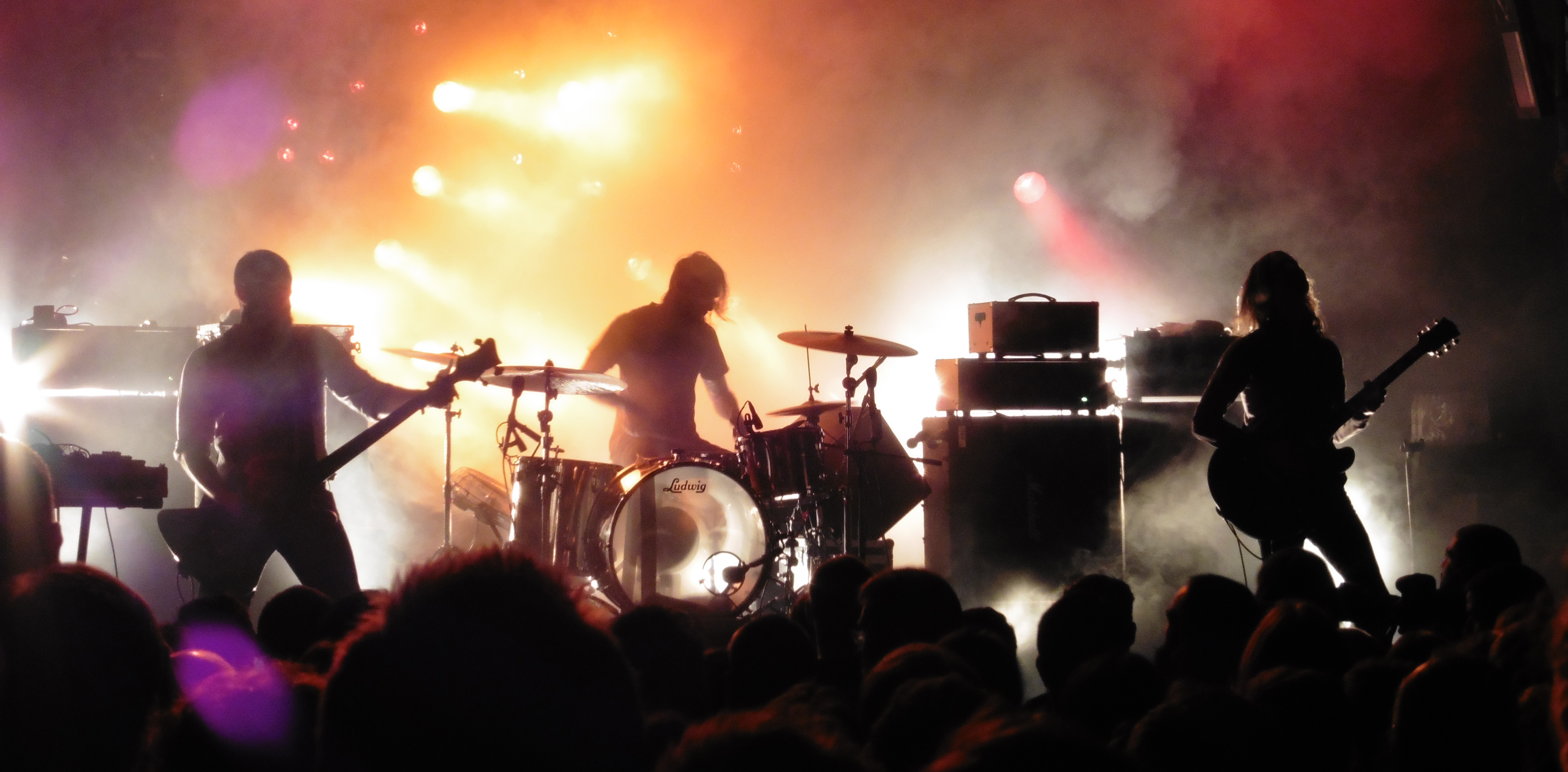
Many groups, including Russian Circles, are mostly instrumental

According to Tom O'Boyle of Metal Hammer: "'Post-metal' is a term as nebulous as the music it describes, no one having quite decided whether it describes a sub-genre unto itself or multiple stylistic elements found in a broad cross-section of metal’s ever multiplying sub-genres." Fact writer Robin Jahdi notes that "the best Neurosis albums don't sound anything like the best offerings from Isis" and that the genre cannot be readily distinguished from doom metal, modern black metal, and progressive metal, "taking in all of these elements without being entirely any one of them". Contemporary post-metal is often seen as combining "elements of doom metal, sludge, and/or black metal with elements of post-rock and shoegaze", being more "peaceful" than metal but retaining its dark theming and harsh vocal style. As with post-rock, however, many bands are instrumental and when vocals are used, they often "resemble another accompanying instrument" rather than actual words. Songs are typically long and employ crescendos, gradually building upon repeated themes; Aaron Turner of Isis stated that "the standard song format of verse-chorus-verse-chorus is something that has been done and redone, and it seems pointless to adhere to that structure when there are so many other avenues to explore".

=== Aesthetic and culture ===
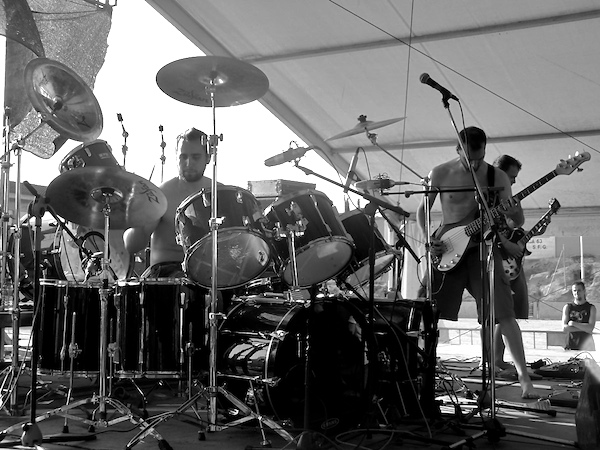
Pelican, also instrumental, diverge from heavy metal conventions in all aspects of their style and approach.

Noting the divergence from typical metal fashion, The New York Times described a 2005 Pelican show at the Knitting Factory in New York City: "Instead of long hair and all-black outfits, the crowd was displaying the trappings of brainy, slightly nerdy indie rock. Young men wore artistically cropped hair and tight-legged jeans, and there was even a smattering of young women in librarian glasses and worn-out Chuck Taylor sneakers." Jon Wiederhorn describes the post-metal scene as a "global community of artists" positioned on the "fringes of the underground." Pelican's Trevor de Brauw stated in 2007:

I have an affinity [f]or metal, but I don't think of Pelican as a metal band. So when people call us 'instrumental', or post-metal, or metalcore or whatever, I can see why they say that, but it's not something that I feel a close connection with. I feel we're part of a community with some bands – Mono are good friends of ours, but I don't feel that we're that similar musically. Their music is more similar to classical music, whereas I feel ours has more in common with punk and hardcore.

== See also ==
- Avant-garde metal
- Doomed to Fail, a music history book focused on post-metal and similar styles
- Post Fest, a music festival focused on focused on post-metal and post-rock music
