= High on Fire discography =

- Studio albums: 9
- EPs: 2
- Live albums: 3
- Compilation albums: 1
- Singles: 4
- Music videos: 11
- Splits: 4

The discography of American heavy metal band High on Fire consists of nine studio albums, three live albums one compilation album, two extended plays (EPs), four singles, four splits and eleven music videos. Formed in Oakland, California in 1998, the band won the Grammy Award for Best Metal Performance with their song "Electric Messiah" in 2019.

== Albums ==
=== Studio albums ===
List of studio albums, with selected peak chart positions
Title	Album details	Peak chart positions						
Title	Album details	US	US Hard Rock	US Independent	US Tastemaker	US Heatseekers	US Rock	US Album Sales
The Art of Self Defense	Released: March 7, 2000; Label: Man's Ruin; Format: CD, LP, 2×LP, DL	–	–	–	–	–	–	–
Surrounded by Thieves	Released: May 28, 2002; Label: Relapse; Format: CD, LP, 2×LP, DL	–	–	–	–	–	–	–
Blessed Black Wings	Released: February 1, 2005; Label: Relapse; Format: CD, LP, 2×LP, DL	–	–	–	40	–	–	–
Death Is This Communion	Released: September 18, 2007; Label: Relapse; Format: CD, LP, 2×LP, DL	142	22	18	10	2	–	–
Snakes for the Divine	Released: February 23, 2010; Label: E1 Music; Format: CD, LP, 2×LP, DL	63	5	6	4	–	14	63
De Vermis Mysteriis	Released: April 3, 2012; Label: E1 Music; Format: CD, LP, 2×LP, DL	63	5	7	10	–	21	63
Luminiferous	Released: June 23, 2015; Label: E1 Music; Format: CD, LP, 2×LP, DL	110	2	5	5	–	15	52
Electric Messiah	Released: October 5, 2018; Label: E1 Music; Format: CD, LP, 2×LP, DL	127	5	5	4	–	23	24
Cometh the Storm	Released: April 19, 2024; Label: MNRK Heavy; Format: CD, LP, 2×LP, DL	–	–	–	–	–	–	20

=== Live albums ===
List of live albums, with selected details
Title	Album details	Notes
Live from the Relapse Contamination Festival	Released: October 2, 2005; Label: Relapse; Format: CD, LP	Recorded on location at the Trocadero Theatre in Philadelphia, Pennsylvania on January 19, 2003, during the Relapse Contamination Festival.
Spitting Fire Live, Vol. 1	Released: June 18, 2013; Label: E1 Music; Format: CD, LP	Recorded live at the Bowery Ballroom in Manhattan, New York on November 30, 2012, and at the Music Hall of Williamsburg, Brooklyn, New York on December 1, 2012.
Spitting Fire Live, Vol. 2	Released: June 18, 2013; Label: E1 Music; Format: CD, LP	Recorded live at the Music Hall of Williamsburg in Brooklyn, New York on December 1, 2012.

=== Compilation albums ===
List of compilation albums, with selected details
Title	Album details	Notes
Spitting Fire Live Vol. 1 & Vol. 2	Released: July 1, 2013; Label: Century Media; Format: 2×LP	Compilation of Spitting Fire Live, Vol. 1 and Spitting Fire Live, Vol. 2. Released in Europe.

== Extended plays ==
List of extended plays
Title	EP details	Notes
High on Fire	Released: 1999; Label: 12th Records; Formats: CD	Debut release. All three songs were later re-recorded and included on The Art of Self Defense.
Bat Salad	Released: April 13, 2019; Label: E1 Music; Formats: 12", DL	Record Store Day exclusive. Includes covers of Celtic Frost's "Into the Crypts of Rays" and Bad Brains' "Don't Bother Me".

== Splits ==
List of split releases
Release	Year	Label	Contribution
with Mastodon	2002	Relapse Records	"Hung, Drawn, & Quartered"
with Ruins	2005	Skin Graft Records	"Brother in the Wind"
with Coliseum & Baroness	2007	Relapse Records	"Rumors of War"
with Valient Thorr	2012	Volcom Entertainment	"Speak in Tongues"

== Singles ==
List of singles
Title	Year	Album	Label
"Frost Hammer"	2010	Snakes for the Divine	E1 Music
"Speak in Tongues"	2010	De Vermis Mysteriis	E1 Music
"Fertile Green"	2012	De Vermis Mysteriis	E1 Music
"Slave the Hive"	2013	Luminiferous	Scion Audio/Visual

== Guest appearances ==
List of non-single guest appearances
Song	Year	Album	Label
"Iron Fist"	2022	Löve Me Förever: A Tribute to Motörhead	Psycho Waxx

== Music videos ==
List of music videos
Title	Year	Director(s)	Album
"Hung, Drawn and Quartered"	2002	Jenny McGee	Surrounded by Thieves
"Razor Hoof"	2002	Babak Sarrafan	Surrounded by Thieves
"Devilution"	2005	Gary Smithson	Blessed Black Wings
"Rumors of War"	2007	Soren	Death Is This Communion
"Frost Hammer"	2010	Kevin Custer	Snakes for the Divine
"Fertile Green"	2012	Phil Mucci	De Vermis Mysteriis
"Slave the Hive"	2013	—N/a	Luminiferous
"The Black Plot"	2016	Gina Niespodziani and Mark Szumski	Luminiferous
"Electric Messiah" (lyric video)	2018	—N/a	Electric Messiah
"Burning Down"	2024	Lars Kristoffer Hormander	Cometh the Storm
"Cometh The Storm"	2024	Phil Mucci	Cometh the Storm
