= 2002 in heavy metal music =

This is a timeline documenting the events of heavy metal in 2002.

== Newly formed bands Bolt Thrower — Honour Valour Pride 2001 ==
- 3,14...
- Adrift
- All Ends
- All Shall Perish
- Alltheniko
- Angtoria
- Arkona
- Asesino
- Astral Doors
- Audrey Horne
- Augury
- Avian
- Bilocate
- Bloodsimple
- Brand New Sin
- Brides of Destruction
- Code
- Crazy Lixx
- Delain
- Despised Icon
- DevilDriver
- Drudkh
- Eluveitie
- Epica
- Exmortus
- Flyleaf
- Gama Bomb
- Giant Squid
- God Is an Astronaut
- Heidevolk
- In Solitude
- Iron Mask
- Kivimetsän Druidi
- Krux
- Lethian Dreams
- Murderdolls
- Midnattsol
- Minsk
- Misery Signals
- Nemesea
- Obscura
- OSI
- Psyopus
- Red
- The Saddest Landscape
- Sonic Syndicate
- Star One
- Sturmgeist
- Suicide Silence
- Symphony in Peril
- Teräsbetoni
- The Absence
- Theocracy
- Torture Killer
- Vektor
- Velvet Revolver
- Winds of Plague
- Violator
- Woods of Ypres
- Zonaria

== Reformed bands ==
- Down
- Osmi Putnik
- Prong
- Trouble
- Whitesnake

== Albums ==
- 3 Inches of Blood – Battlecry Under a Winter Sun
- 36 Crazyfists – Bitterness the Star
- The Acacia Strain – ...And Life Is Very Long
- Agalloch – The Mantle
- All That Remains – Behind Silence and Solitude
- Amon Amarth – Versus the World
- Arghoslent – Incorrigible Bigotry
- Anvil – Still Going Strong
- Atreyu – Suicide Notes and Butterfly Kisses
- Avantasia – The Metal Opera Part II
- Bathory – Nordland I
- Behemoth – Zos Kia Cultus (Here and Beyond)
- Beseech – Souls Highway
- Between the Buried and Me – Between the Buried and Me
- Black Label Society – 1919 Eternal
- Black Sabbath – Past Lives (live)
- Blind Guardian – A Night at the Opera
- Bloodbath – Resurrection Through Carnage
- Bolt Thrower – Honour – Valour – Pride
- Bon Jovi – Bounce
- BoySetsFire – Live for Today
- Boris – Heavy Rocks (2002 album)
- Breaking Benjamin – Saturate
- Cathedral – The VIIth Coming
- Cannibal Corpse – Gore Obsessed
- Chevelle – Wonder What's Next
- Coal Chamber – Dark Days
- Cog – Just Visiting Part One (EP)
- Cog – Just Visiting Part Two (EP)
- Crazy Town – Darkhorse
- Danzig – Danzig 777: I Luciferi
- Darkane – Expanding Senses
- Dark Tranquillity – Damage Done
- Decapitated – Nihility
- Demon Hunter – Demon Hunter
- Despised Icon – Consumed by Your Poison
- Def Leppard – X
- The Dillinger Escape Plan – Irony Is a Dead Scene (EP)
- Dio – Killing the Dragon
- Disturbed – Believe
- Down – Down II: A Bustle in Your Hedgerow
- Dream Evil – Dragonslayer
- Dream Theater – Six Degrees of Inner Turbulence
- Electric Wizard – Let Us Prey
- Fall of the Leafe - Fermina
- Fear Factory – Concrete (originally recorded in 1991, but not released until 2002)
- Finch – What It Is to Burn
- Firewind – Between Heaven and Hell
- Fog (MX) - Mirando La Luz
- Freak Kitchen – Move
- HammerFall – Crimson Thunder
- Hardline – II
- Hatebreed – Perseverance
- Hate Eternal – King of All Kings
- Heaven Shall Burn – Whatever It May Take
- High on Fire – Surrounded by Thieves
- Immolation – Unholy Cult
- Immortal – Sons of Northern Darkness
- In Flames – Reroute to Remain
- Iron Savior – Condition Red
- Isis – Oceanic
- Kataklysm – Shadows & Dust
- Killswitch Engage – Alive or Just Breathing
- King Diamond – Abigail II: The Revenge
- Korn – Untouchables
- Krux – Krux
- Kylesa – Kylesa
- Lacuna Coil – Comalies
- Lordi – Get Heavy
- Lost Horizon – A Flame to the Ground Beneath
- Luca Turilli – Prophet of the Last Eclipse
- Manowar – Warriors of the World
- Mastodon – Remission
- Megadeth – Rude Awakening (live)
- Megadeth – Still Alive... and Well? (compilation)
- Mercenary – Everblack
- Meshuggah – Nothing
- Motörhead – Hammered
- Mudvayne – The End Of All Things To Come
- Nightwish – Century Child
- Nine Inch Nails – And All That Could Have Been (live)
- Nile – In Their Darkened Shrines
- Nonpoint - Development
- Norma Jean – Bless the Martyr and Kiss the Child
- Opeth – Deliverance
- Orange Goblin – Coup de Grace
- Origin – Informis Infinitas Inhumanitas
- Otep – Sevas Tra
- Pagan's Mind – Celestial Entrance
- Pain – Nothing Remains the Same
- Papa Roach – Lovehatetragedy
- Pitchshifter – PSI
- Poison the Well – Tear from the Red
- Power Quest – Wings of Forever
- Primal Fear – Black Sun
- Pro-Pain – Shreds of Dignity
- Protest the Hero – A Calculated Use of Sound
- QueenAdreena – Drink Me
- Raunchy – Velvet Noise
- The Red Chord – Fused Together in Revolving Doors
- Rhapsody – Power of the Dragonflame
- Rotting Christ – Genesis
- Rush – Vapor Trails
- Sacrificium – Cold Black Piece of Flesh
- Satyricon – Volcano
- Saxon – Heavy Metal Thunder
- Scarve – Luminiferous
- Sentenced – The Cold White Light
- Seven Witches – Xiled to Infinity and One
- Shadows Fall – The Art of Balance
- Sinergy – Suicide by My Side
- Slechtvalk – The War That Plagues the Lands
- Soilwork – Natural Born Chaos
- Sonata Arctica – Songs of Silence – Live in Tokyo (live)
- Soulfly – 3
- Spectre Dragon – Under Hell's Command
- Star One – Space Metal
- Stone Sour – Stone Sour
- SugarComa – Becoming Something Else
- Symphony X – The Odyssey
- System of a Down – Steal This Album!
- Theory of a Deadman – Theory of a Deadman
- Threshold – Critical Mass
- Trapt – Trapt
- Týr – How Far to Asgaard
- Underoath – The Changing of Times
- Vader – Revelations
- Vanden Plas – Beyond Daylight
- Vintersorg – Visions from the Spiral Generator
- Visions of Atlantis – Eternal Endless Infinity
- WarCry – WarCry
- WarCry – El Sello de los Tiempos
- Winds – Reflections of the I
- Without Face - Astronomicon
- Whispering Gallery – Lost as One

== Bands disbanded ==
- Alice in Chains
- Breach
- Fear Factory
- Godflesh
- Lifer
- Megadeth

== Events ==
- Dave Mustaine disbanded Megadeth after suffering a severe arm injury which left him unable to play.
- Ex-Iron Maiden drummer Clive Burr was diagnosed with multiple sclerosis.
- Dave Lombardo rejoined Slayer.
- Guitarist Jeff Phillips joined Kittie as a session member, replacing Fallon Bowman. Bassist Talena Atfield left and was replaced by Jennifer Arroyo.

== Deaths ==
- February 2 – Pavel Nicholas "Paul" Baloff, vocalist of Exodus, was taken off life support after suffering a stroke and falling into a coma. He died at the age of 41.
- March 26 – Randolpho Francisco "Randy" Castillo, drummer of Mötley Crüe and former drummer of Ozzy Osbourne and Lita Ford, died from squamous cell carcinoma complications at the age of 51.
- April 5 – Layne Thomas Staley, founding member and original vocalist of Alice in Chains, died from a speedball overdose at the age of 34. His partially decomposed body was found on April 19.
- June 6 – Robbinson Lantz "Robbin" Crosby, former guitarist of Ratt, died from a heroin overdose, worsened by AIDS-related complications, at the age of 42.
- June 27 – John Alec "The Ox" Entwistle, founding member and bassist of The Who, died from a cocaine-induced heart attack at the age of 57.
- August 9 – Paul Samson, founder, guitarist, vocalist, and producer of Samson, died from cancer at the age of 49.
- August 14 – David Wayne "Dave" Williams, vocalist of Drowning Pool, died from heart failure, caused by hypertrophic cardiomyopathy, at the age of 30. He was found dead in the band's tour bus.
- October 17 – Steve MacDonald, drummer of Gorguts, died by suicide at the age of 31.
- Altemir Souza, former guitarist of Krisiun, died from injuries sustained in a motorbike accident.
- Yuji “Terry” Izumisawa, former guitarist of X Japan, died from injuries sustained in a car accident.

Preceded by 2001	Heavy Metal Timeline; 2002	Succeeded by 2003
