= Great Depression (disambiguation) =

The Great Depression was a dramatic, worldwide economic downturn beginning in 1929 and lasting through most of the 1930s.

Great Depression may also refer to:

== By country ==
- Great Depression in Australia
- Great Depression in Canada
- Great Depression in India
- Great Depression in France
- Great Depression in Latin America
- Great Depression in the Netherlands
- Great Depression in Romania
- Great Depression in the United Kingdom
- Great Depression in the United States

== Books ==
- The Great Depression: America, 1929–1941, a 1984 history by Robert S. McElvaine
- The Great Depression, a 1990 Canadian history book by Pierre Berton

== Music ==
- The Great Depression (Common Grackle album), 2010
- The Great Depression (Trigger the Bloodshed album), 2009
- The Great Depression (Blindside album), 2005
- The Great Depression (Defiance, Ohio album), 2006
- The Great Depression (DMX album), 2001
- The Great Depression (As It Is album), 2018
- "The Great Depression", a song by Misery Index from Retaliate
- "The Great Depression" a song by Raunchy from A Discord Electric
- "Great Depression", a song by Soulfly from Omen

== See also ==
- 2008 financial crisis, a severe worldwide economic crisis driven by real estate conditions and risky ventures in the United States.
- Great Recession, the marked general economic decline that affected many countries from 2007 to 2009
- Great Slump (disambiguation)
- The Long Depression, an 1873–1896 economic recession formerly known as the Great Depression
- Second Great Depression (disambiguation)
