= Live from the Relapse Contamination Festival =

Live album by High on Fire
- Released: October 2, 2005; January 6, 2009 (reissue)
- Recorded: January 19, 2003
- Genre: Stoner metal, sludge metal
- Length: 33:54
- Label: Relapse Records

High on Fire chronology
Death Is This Communion (2007)	Live from the Relapse Contamination Festival (2009)	Snakes for the Divine (2010)

Professional ratings
Review scores
Source	Rating
AllMusic	3/5 stars

Live From the Relapse Contamination Festival is a live album by American heavy metal band High on Fire. It was recorded during the 2003 Contamination Festival and originally released in a limited quantity of 2,000 in 2005. The album was later re-released in 2009, long after High on Fire had officially left Relapse Records.

== Track listing ==
All tracks by High on Fire, except where noted

1. "Blood from Zion" – 5:00
2. "To Cross the Bridge" – 5:43
3. "Nemesis" – 3:38
4. "Razorhoof" – 2:45
5. "Speedwolf" – 4:30
6. "Eyes & Teeth" – 4:13
7. "Hung, Drawn & Quartered" – 4:17
8. "Witching Hour" (Venom cover) – 3:47 (Lant, Dunn, Bray)

== Credits ==
- Matt Pike – guitar, vocals
- Des Kensel – drums
- George Rice – bass
- Matthew F. Jacobson – Executive Producer
- Mike Mullin – mastering
- Orion Landau – artwork
