= Eve's Seed =

Book by Robert S. McElvaine

Eve’s Seed: Biology, the Sexes, and the Course of History
- First edition
- Author: Robert S. McElvaine
- Cover artist: Ede Dreikurs
- Language: English
- Subject: Women, men, biology, religion, history
- Genre: non-fiction
- Publisher: McGraw-Hill
- Publication date: 2001
- Publication place: United States
- Pages: 453
- ISBN: 978-0-07-135528-5
- Website: http://Evesseed.net

Eve's Seed: Biology, the Sexes, and the Course of History is a 2001 book by noted American historian and writer Robert S. McElvaine that introduced the new field of "biohistory" and presents a major reinterpretation of the human experience. This "provocative study" is history on the grandest scale. It "re-synthesizes the full sweep of human history around the concept of sexual difference". McElvaine utilizes biology, anthropology, psychology, religious studies, women's studies, and popular culture, in addition to more traditional history, in weaving his reinterpretation of the course of human history from evolution to the present. He builds upon and extends the work of such thinkers as Karen Horney, Margaret Mead, Ashley Montagu, and Gerda Lerner.

A Chinese edition of Eve's Seed was published by Horizon Media Company of Beijing in 2004.

== Significance and reception ==
Some leading academics see Eve's Seed as a revolutionary work of major importance in how we understand human development, history, religion, and the sexes. World historian William Hardy McNeill calls Eve's Seed "a powerful, learned and provocative work" that "is a radical revision of traditional visions of human history". "As Marx turned Hegel upside down," Pulitzer Prize-winning Stanford historian Carl Degler has written, "so McElvaine overturns, among others, Aristotle, Marx, Freud, and even Darwin in showing how biological and cultural evolution need no longer see men and women as opposites or unequal". Degler calls Eve's Seed a "revelation, engagingly and imaginatively written and ... filled with fresh and challenging interpretations".

In a rare case of agreement, feminist pioneer Betty Friedan and Harvard sociobiologist Edward O. Wilson both see Eve's Seed as a ground-breaking work that will change the way we see the human condition. "Eve's Seed signals a significant paradigm shift,” Friedan wrote, and Wilson said, "a new field is stirring to life" with the book.

Writing in the Los Angeles Times Book Review, Joyce Appleby, past president of the American Historical Association says that Eve's Seed is written in "sparkling prose" and terms it "a bestseller waiting to be discovered". In a starred review, Publishers Weekly said that McElvaine's "challenging overview" is "daring": "Written with passion, wit and insight, this accessible book throws down the gauntlet to academics and nonspecialists alike, daring a radical rethinking of the basic 'truths' on which cultures have been constructed."

McElvaine's concept of biohistory has been explored in articles in The New York Times and the Chronicle of Higher Education, and his interdisciplinary reinterpretation of the human experience has been the subject of panels at meetings of the American Historical Association, the American Anthropological Association, the International Freud Conference, the International Society for the History, Philosophy, and Social Studies of Biology, and the Organization for the Study of Communication, Language, and Gender.

McElvaine has presented lectures on the ideas contained in Eve's Seed at conferences in Russia, Austria, South Korea, South Africa, Australia, New Zealand, and Papua New Guinea.

A major international, interdisciplinary conference on the McElvaine Thesis, "Bridging the Great Divide: Robert S. McElvaine's Eve's Seed and the Quest to Bring Together Biology, Anthropology, Religion, and History", was held in 2002.

== Overview ==
McElvaine argues that because women can do certain things that men cannot—carry and give birth to offspring and nourish them from their bodies—many men have experienced to varying degrees what psychoanalyst Karen Horney termed "womb envy." Such insecure men have long attempted to define manhood in terms of complete opposition to womanhood. A "real man" has been seen in most cultures as "notawoman." To counterbalance the biological "no-man's lands" of pregnancy, birthing, and nursing, men create artificial "no-woman's lands." To compensate for what men cannot do, they tell women they may not do other things. Which areas women are excluded from vary from culture to culture, McElvaine writes, but they have usually included the clergy, politics, the military, and most of the business world.

Among McElvaine's contentions are that the invention of agriculture—which he believes was almost certainly accomplished by women, who were responsible for the provision of plant food in hunter-gatherer societies—disrupted the long-standing roles of the sexes and, over a period of time, devalued the traditional male roles, especially hunting. McElvaine begins the book by saying that if he had to sum up human history in a single sentence, it would be: "Hell hath no fury like a man devalued."

Ultimately, the McElvaine Thesis maintains, agriculture provided men with a metaphor—seeds planted in the furrowed soil seemingly being analogous to men "planting" semen in the furrowed anatomy of a woman—that enabled them to claim that males are the sex with creative power: the authors of new life who therefore have authority over women. It necessarily followed that the Ultimate Creative Power, God, must also be male. This prehistoric mistake has, McElvaine says, enormously influenced all of history.

== Synopsis ==
The following synopsis of some of the major points in Eve's Seed is based on information contained in the book's official website.

- Because men cannot compete with women’s capabilities in the crucial realms of reproduction and nourishing offspring, McElvaine argues, men generally seek to avoid a single standard of human behavior and achievement. They create separate definitions of “manliness” which are based on a false opposition to “womanliness.” A “real man” has been seen in most cultures as “notawoman.”
- Although this viewpoint actually begins with woman as the “standard” human and proceeds to define man by its supposed vast differences from that standard, people do not like to see themselves in negative terms, so men have generally sought ways to transform woman into a negative, thus making man positive.
- Human life—and the situation of both sexes—was radically changed about 10,000 years ago by the invention of agriculture, which in all likelihood was accomplished by women.
- In one of his most striking contentions, McElvaine says that the story of Adam and Eve in the third chapter of Book of Genesis is an allegory for the invention of agriculture by women (Eve’s eating from the Tree of Knowledge) and its long-term consequences (the loss of what seemed in distant retrospect to have been a pre-agricultural paradise in which people lived easily, without work, simply picking fruit from trees, and man having to go forth and till the soil to earn his bread by the sweat of his brow). The “Fall of Man” is a metaphor for an actual fall of men.
- McElvaine says that the development of methods for the intentional production of food (animal herding as well as agriculture) substantially devalued what men had traditionally done. Hunting was no longer needed and defense against other species declined in importance as groups of humans settled in growing numbers in farming areas into which predators ventured less frequently than their paths had crossed those of human hunter-gatherers.
- The loss of value in their traditional roles left men adrift, seeking new meaningful roles, and increasingly resentful of women. The result was what can accurately be seen as a Neolithic and early Bronze Age backlash or “masculinist movement.”
- At this point, McElvaine argues, there arose an almost irresistible metaphor, the very widespread acceptance of which has misshaped human life through all of recorded history. The apparent analogy of a seed being planted in furrowed soil to a male’s “planting” of semen in the vulva of a female led to the conclusion that men provide the seed of new life and women constitute the soil in which that seed grows. This Seed Metaphor, which McElvaine calls "the Conception Misconception," has remained with us throughout history and it continues to mislead us in profound ways down to the present.
- The woman-made world of agriculture had, paradoxically, become a man's world to a degree unprecedented in human existence. As McElvaine puts it: "Hell hath no fury like a man devalued."
- The belief that men have procreative power led inevitably to the conclusion that the supreme Creative Power must also be male. The toxic fruit that grew from the Seed Metaphor, McElvaine says, was male monotheism.
- The combination of the belief that God (or the god who is the ultimate creator) is male with the notion that humans are created in God's image yielded the inescapable conclusion that men are closer than women to godly perfection. Thus the line from the misconceptions about conception emanating from the seed metaphor to the belief, given its classic expressions by Aristotle, Aquinas, and Freud, that women are deformed or “incomplete” men is clear and direct.
- Once the Seed Metaphor had sprouted into the idea that God is male and so women are inferior, the original “notawoman” definition of manhood took on new and more menacing implications. Now what had been an essentially horizontal division became a clearly vertical one: traits and values associated with women were not simply classified as improper for men, but as inferior.
- The total subordination of women throughout recorded history, McElvaine argues, is but the first part of the devastating legacy of the Neolithic backlash and the Seed Metaphor. Equally important has been the concomitant suppression in men of all values, ideas, and characteristics associated with women and so defined as inferior. The rest, he says, is history—pretty much all of it—and, the gains of women in recent decades notwithstanding, these legacies from mistaken ideas in the Neolithic Age continue to have enormous effects on us today.
