= Vpered (disambiguation) =

Vpered (a transliteration of the Russian word "вперёд" (vperyod) meaning "forward" or "advance") was a faction of the Russian Social Democratic Labour Party gathered by Alexander Bogdanov in 1909.

Vpered or Vperyod may also refer to:

- Vpered! (1873) (Вперед), a political journal founded by the Russian populist émigré Pyotr Lavrov, published from 1873 until 1877
- Socialist League Vpered, a Trotskyist organisation founded in 2005
- HS Vpered, a Russian hospital ship sunk in World War I in the Black Sea
- Vpered, a weekly newspaper published by the Social Democratic Workers' Party in Subcarpathian Rus'

== See also ==
- Ukraine – Forward! (Ukrajina – Vpered!), a political party in Ukraine
- People's Self-Defense (until 2010 named "Forward, Ukraine!" (Ukrainian: Вперед, Україно!; Vpered, Ukrajino!), a political party in Ukraine
- Vpered/Obratno, a 2010 album by the Ajerbajani band 3,14...
- Forward (disambiguation)
