= Womb envy =

Male envy of women's biological functions

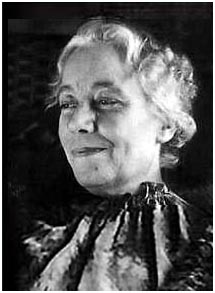
The feminist psychoanalyst Karen Horney (c. 1938).

In psychology, womb envy denotes the envy that men may feel of the biological functions of women (pregnancy, childbirth, breastfeeding). The neo-Freudian psychiatrist Karen Horney (1885–1952) proposed this as a male psychological trait. These emotions could fuel the social subordination of women, and drive men to succeed in other areas of life, such as business, medicine, law, and politics. Each term is analogous to the concept of female penis envy presented in Freudian psychology. In this they address the gender role social dynamics underlying the "envy and fascination with the female breasts and lactation, with pregnancy and childbearing, and vagina envy [that] are clues and signs of transsexualism and to a femininity complex of men, which is defended against by psychological and sociocultural means".

== Theory ==
Womb envy denotes the envy men may feel towards a woman's role in nurturing and sustaining life. In coining the term, the Neo-Freudian psychiatrist Karen Horney (1885–1952) proposed that men experience womb envy more powerfully than women experience penis envy, because "men need to disparage women more than women need to disparage men". This feeling is stronger in men because they want to live up to the male stereotype of having the upper hand and dominance over everyone. Boehm (1930, p. 457) said that when others have something more that we do not have ourselves then this excites our envy. As a psychoanalyst, Horney considered womb envy a cultural, psychosocial tendency, like the concept of penis envy, rather than an innate male psychological trait. She believed that it arises when men think they are not in control and powerful in their lives like they thought they were.

Although Karen Horney is generally credited with originating the idea of "womb envy," especially in her 1926 article "The Flight from Womanhood: The Masculinity-Complex in Women as Viewed by Men and by Women," she herself never used the term. One early appearance of the phrase was in Margaret Mead's 1949 book, Male and Female. Mead may have coined the term.

Brian Luke, in his book Brutal: Manhood and the Exploitation of Animals, discusses three ways in which men who experience womb envy may respond: by compensating—constructing a realm of exclusively male activity, by revaluing—devaluing the functions specific to women and/or magnifying the functions specific to men, and by appropriation—taking control of female specific functions.

Luke attributes the coining of this term not to Horney, but to Eva Kittay. In her 1984 article, Rereading Freud on 'Femininity' or Why Not Womb Envy?, Kittay had posed the question of why there is not a concept analogous to penis envy and offers the term womb envy.

In Personality Theories, Barbara Engler discusses the often unconscious and indirect ways that womb envy manifests. "Womb envy, rather than being openly acknowledged by most males, has often taken subtle and indirect forms, such as rituals of taboo, isolation, and cleansing that have been frequently associated with menstruation and childbirth, the need to disparage women, accuse them of witchcraft, belittle their achievements and deny them equal rights." Engler also refers to criticism of Horney's theory on the grounds that it equated womanhood with motherhood.

Discussing the limitations of Horney's broader psychological viewpoint, Bernardo J. Carducci points out the comparative lack of empirical evidence saying, "In comparison to other theorists..., Horney's work has generated very little empirical research among personality psychologists. Although her theoretical ideas were presented in a relatively straightforward manner, they have not stimulated much interest in others to investigate their validity. This may be in part due to the rejection of her ideas by the more traditional and influential Freudian tradition operating at the time."

In Eve's Seed (2000), historian Robert S. McElvaine extended Horney's argument that womb envy is a powerful, elementary factor in the psychological insecurity suffered by many men. He coined the term non-menstrual syndrome (NMS), denoting a man's possible insecurity before the biologic and reproductive traits of woman; thus, womb envy may impel men to define their identities in opposition to women. Hence, men who are envious of women's reproductive traits insist that a "real man" must be "not-a-woman", thus they may seek to socially dominate women—what they may or may not do in life—as psychological compensation for what men cannot do biologically.

Along with womb envy there are other mentions that also discussed on topic of womb envy though not the exact name. Michael Joseph Eisler (1921) wrote it by looking at male pregnancy fantasies, not the direct term of womb envy is mentioned but contributed the male envy of female reproductive physiology was directed towards it. Boehm (1930) called it parturition envy instead, Zilboorg (1944) called it women envy, and Phyllis Chesler (1978) called it uterus envy.

== Vagina envy ==
Vagina envy denotes the envy males may feel towards females for having a vagina. In Psychoanalysis and Male Sexuality (1966), Hendrik Ruitenbeek relates vagina envy to men's desire to be able to give birth and to urinate and to masturbate in ways physically different from those available to men, and that such psychological envy might produce misogyny in neurotic men. Moreover, in Vagina Envy in Men (1993), the physician Harold Tarpley elucidates the theoretic differences among the constructs of "vagina envy", "womb envy", "breast envy", and "parturition envy", emotions wherein men suffer envy—"a grudging desire for another's excellence or advantage"—of women's female biologic capabilities of pregnancy, parturition, breast feeding, and of the social-role freedom to physically nurture children.

== Criticism ==
The theory of "womb envy" or "vaginal envy" is criticized based on the position that it indicates how the essence of being a woman lies in motherhood. Michelle Walker points out that the woman defined in terms of her essential maternity reduces her to her gender characteristics and could, hence, be exploited or be defined according to the terms of patriarchal logic and phallocentric impositions. Domna Stanton, for instance, drew from Jacques Derrida's work to support this argument, particularly, the theorist's position that "the maternal, which is metaphorized as total being to substantiate a notion that can combat the paternal, represents only one aspect of potential female difference."
