= The Art of Self Defense =

The Art of Self Defense may refer to:

- Self-defense
- The Art of Self Defense (album), a 2000 album by High on Fire
- The Art of Self Defense (1941 film), an animated Disney short
- The Art of Self-Defense (2019 film), a dark comedy film
