= River Lethe in popular culture =

The river Lethe from Greek mythology has appeared in various works of culture since the times of Ancient Greece.

== Music ==
- In Tony Banks' first solo album, A Curious Feeling, where he tells the story of a man who makes some kind of pact with the devil and finishes by losing his memory, the ninth song is called "The Waters of Lethe".
- The Swedish/Finnish melodic death metal supergroup Solution .45 released the song "Lethean Tears" in their album "For Aeons Past" in 2010
- Gothic Metal band Tristania recorded a song called "Lethean River", from their album "Beyond the Veil" in 1999.
- Lethian Dreams, the French doom and depressive black metal band, seems to reference the river Lethe with their name.

== Plays ==
In Sarah Ruhl's Eurydice, the river Lethe is a central theme of the play. All the shades must drink from Lethe and become like stones, speaking in their inaudible language and forgetting everything of the world.

Metastasio's opera libretto Artaserse references the River Lethe in one of Artabano's arias, Su le sponde del torbido Lete, originally set to music for a tenor voice by Leonardo Vinci. In the aria, Artabano sings of the recently murdered Serse as waiting for revenge on the banks of the turbid Lethe.

In Haydn's opera Orlando Paladino, Orlando is so consumed by his unrequited love for Angelica that it drives him to insanity and in order to rid him of his insanity, and the sorceress Alcina sends him to the underworld and orders Caronte to bathe him in the waters of the River Lethe to make him forget about Angelica and regain his sanity.

In Offenbach's operetta Orpheus in the Underworld, the character John Styx drinks the waters of Lethe in a deliberate attempt to forget things. His forgetfulness is a significant factor in the plot of the last act.

== Other ==
In the Japanese manga Sailor Moon, written and illustrated by Naoko Takeuchi, the "River of Forgetfulness" appears in act 56, the seventh act of the Stars arc. Sailor Lethe, guardian of the planet Lethe, is the watchman of the river. Sailor Lethe's much less aggressive sister, Sailor Mnemosyne, is the watchman of the River of Memory. When Sailor Moon falls into Lethe's river, she loses all sense of her memory, as do the rest of her allies when they fall in. Sailor Moon is able to regain her memory, but Princess Kakyuu must drink from Mnemosyne's River of Memory in order to snap out of Lethe's spell.

In Hercules: The Animated Series, the waters of the Lethe are used in two episodes: "Hercules and the Pool Party", where Hades uses a Lethe Pool of Forgetfulness to erase the memories of the other Olympian gods, and "Hercules and the Aetolian Amphora", where a young Megara steals an amphora full of waters from the Pool of Forgetfulness to erase bad memories of a date with Adonis, encountering and then forgetting Hercules in the process.

In the computer role-playing game Arcanum: Of Steamworks and Magick Obscura, the Lethe Wwyvern has venom that affects the mind of its victims. Characters permanently loses points in their intelligence attribute for every hit from the wyvern.
