= The Relentless Revolution =

The Relentless Revolution: A History of Capitalism
- Author: Joyce Appleby
- Publisher: W. W. Norton & Company
- Publication date: United States; 2010
- Pages: 494
- ISBN: 978-0-393-06894-8

The Relentless Revolution: A History of Capitalism is a 2010 non-fiction book by American historian and author Joyce Appleby.

The book provides an analysis of the rise and evolution of capitalism over the course of centuries. Appleby argues that capitalism was not an inevitable extension of human nature, as figures like Adam Smith suggested, but a break from the prevailing scarcity of 4,000 years of agricultural societies. She traces its origins primarily to commercial and mercantile changes in Dutch and British history before its global expansion.

== Content ==
The book is an analysis of the rise of capitalism on a global basis and how it has changed, mutated and reinvented itself in a number of ways over the course of centuries. She argues that capitalism was a break from a set of circumstances that had prevailed over the course of 4,000 years and thus must be interpreted as a process of historical change rather than as an inevitable extension of human nature on the lines asserted by Adam Smith. It has its roots in changes in mercantile and commercial activity chiefly located in a certain period in Dutch and then British history (and then on to American history) before expanding across the world in various forms.

Appleby's examination of the history of capitalism begins with the pervasive scarcity of agricultural societies up to the 16th century, and then explores the European divergence away from that pattern from then onwards. As intimated in the title, Appleby's emphasis is upon capitalism as a dynamic force that relentlessly revolutionises itself and the world around it. It therefore has a propulsive force which distinguishes it from the activity of commerce which, she argues, goes back at least as far as Hammurabi, and is distinct from the larger and more profound force of capitalism as she characterises it.

She references other thinkers on a critical basis; for example, in the case of Karl Marx she argues that he was right to conceive of ways in which capital could have been better used but was wrong in failing to see the negative side of communism. She also discusses the ideas of Joseph Schumpeter in arguing that capitalism might fail by destroying institutions that act as custodians to it, reflecting on this notion in light of the 2008 financial crisis. She cites Max Weber as being most influential to her view, emphasising “his emphasis on contingency and unintended consequences in the formation of capitalism."

She is broadly positive towards the dynamic nature of capitalism, describing figures such as Rockefeller, Vanderbilt, Carnegie, Zeiss or Krupp as "swashbuckling heroes of enterprise". However, there are themes within the work that raise fundamental questions about its equity, efficiency and longevity, notably its long-term use of fossil fuels and the problems of sustainability that face humanity now; the damaging effects of imperialism; and the danger of government and public interest being stymied by the strong private interests of the free market.

At the end of the book she discusses the rise of China and its particular form of statist capitalism.
