= Robert S. McElvaine =

American historian

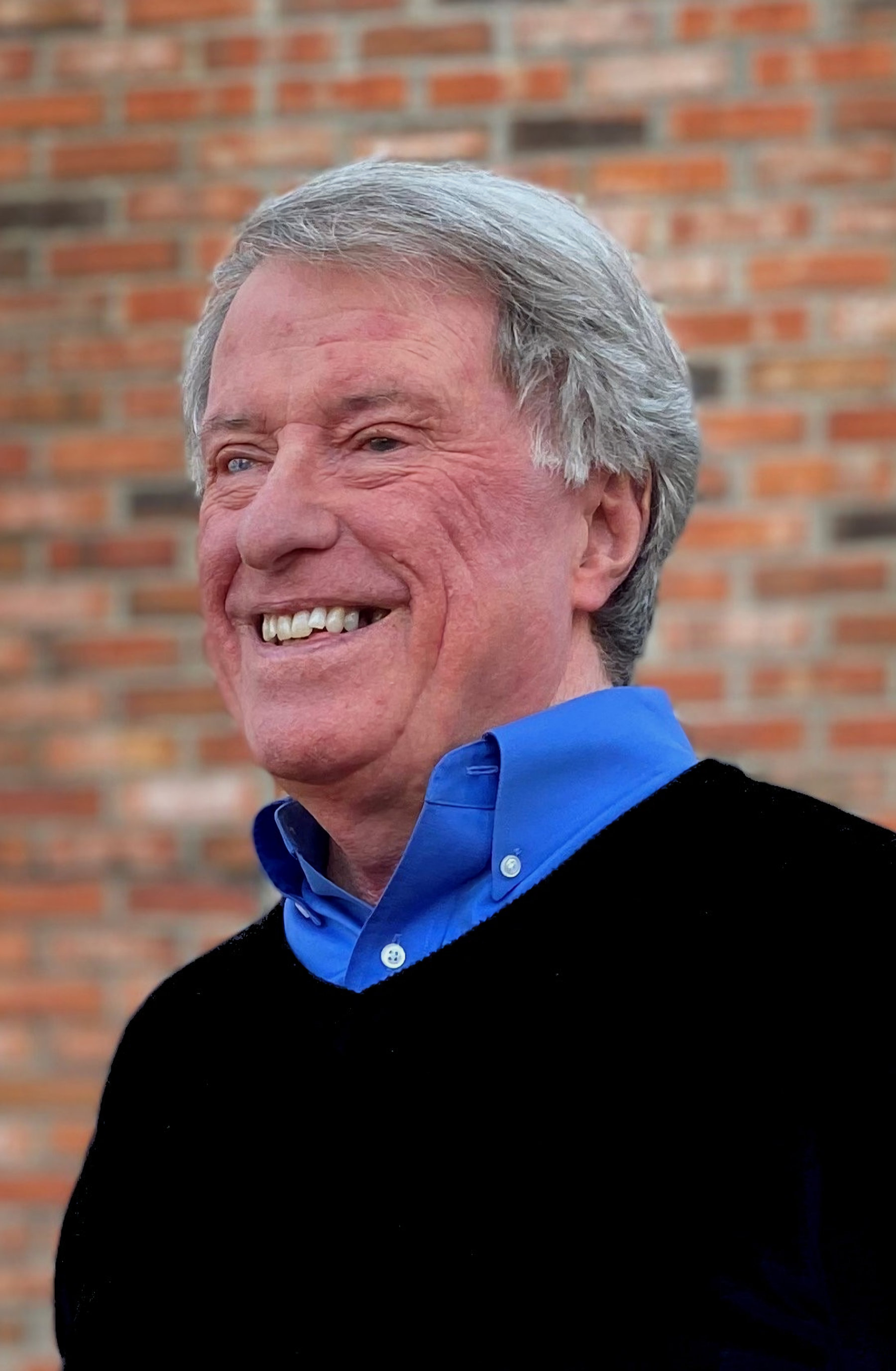
- McElvaine in 2022
- Born: January 24, 1947 (age 79); East Brunswick, New Jersey, U.S.
- Occupations: Historian, writer
- Writing career
- Period: 1983–present
- Subjects: History, sex and gender, women, politics, social issues
- Notable works: Down and Out in the Great Depression: Letters from the “Forgotten Man” The Great Depression: America, 1929-1941 Eve's Seed: Biology, the Sexes, and the Course of History Grand Theft Jesus: The Hijacking of Religion in America The Times They Were a-Changin' – 1964: The Year the Sixties Arrived and the Battle Lines of Today Were Drawn
- Website: www.robertsmcelvaine.com

Robert S. McElvaine (born January 24, 1947) is Elizabeth Chisholm Professor of Arts and Letters and Chair of the Department of History at Millsaps College in Jackson, Mississippi, and the author of eight books and the editor of three. He is considered a historian of the Great Depression.. McElvaine is also known for his work on the centrality of misperceptions of differences and inequality between the sexes in the unfolding of human history.

His latest book, The Times They Were a-Changin’ – 1964: The Year the Sixties Arrived and the Battle Lines of Today Were Drawn, was published by Arcade (distributed by Simon & Schuster) in June 2022.

== Career ==
=== Educator ===
McElvaine began his teaching career at Millsaps College in 1973. Over the years since, he has won numerous awards for his teaching, including a silver medal in the national Professor of the Year program of the Council for the Advancement and Support of Education and being named Millsaps College's Distinguished Professor in 2001 and won the Carnegie Endowment Professor of the Year Award in Mississippi in 2002. At Millsaps, he created new courses, including a series of interdisciplinary courses on decades in twentieth-century America that combine film, literature, music and other cultural forms with more traditional history and a course titled “Sex, Religion, and Prehistory” based on his explorations of the origins of misogyny.

In 1979, McElvaine organized a four-day retrospective, “Mississippi’s Freedom Summer Revisited,” which was held on the campuses of Tougaloo and Millsaps Colleges. It brought together many of those who has participated in the freedom struggle with academics and writers who have studied it and enabled students at both colleges to experience some of the spirit of that time.

=== Author ===
McElvaine's first book, Down and Out in the Great Depression: Letters from the “Forgotten Man”, was published by the University of North Carolina Press in 1983. In The New York Times Book Review, Arthur M. Schlesinger Jr., wrote that the book “shows how Americans responded to economic collapse, not in memory, but in their own words at the time—a compelling contribution to our history.” “Here is history written by the people who had to live it, in the U.S.A. of the 1930’s,” Pete Seeger wrote, “Down and Out is a hell of a good book.” Studs Terkel said, “McElvaine has captured these voices as no one else ever has.” The American Library Association named Down and Out one of the “Outstanding Books of 1983” and Newsday listed it as among the “Best Dozen Books of 1983.”

In 1984, Times Books published McElvaine's second book, The Great Depression: America, 1929–1941. In The New York Times Book Review, Morris Dickstein wrote "It would be hard to find a fairer or more balanced account of how the American people and their leaders learned to grapple with their greatest economic crisis." The book, which came out in a 25th anniversary edition in 2009, has been called “the best one-volume overview of the Great Depression.”

His first two books on the Depression era were named among the “Notable Books of the Year” by the New York Times Book Review and have become standards in the field. They have remained in print and continue to sell four decades after their publication.

In 2007, he wrote an extensive analysis of the economic conditions in comparison with those of the 1920s, “If (Economic) History Doesn't Repeat Itself, Does It Rhyme?” in which he predicted a coming collapse similar to what had happened in 1929. In 2009, Three Rivers (Crown) published a 25th anniversary edition of The Great Depression: America, 1929–1941 with a comprehensive new introduction comparing the economic collapse of 2008 with that of 1929.

His next three books were on contemporary politics in historical context. The End of the Conservative Era – Liberalism After Reagan (1987) and What’s Left? – A New Democratic Vision for America (1996) offered historical based advice and strategy for Democrats. Mario Cuomo: A Biography (Scribner, 1988) was, Sam Roberts wrote in the New York Times Book Review, “a Presidential campaign biography” for which it turned out “there was no campaign.”

In the late 1980s, McElvaine became intrigued by the question of how it came to be that women are seen as inferior to men and has spent much of his time since exploring that issue. He has read and researched widely in fields including anthropology, human evolution, ancient history, and women's history, in order to offer a reinterpretation of the significance of sex in the unfolding of human history. His findings, sometimes called the McElvaine Thesis, were first published in his 2001 book, Eve's Seed: Biology, the Sexes, and the Course of History, which a starred review in Publishers’ Weekly called “a radical rethinking of the basic ‘truths’ on which cultures have been constructed.” It was hailed by a wide variety of scholars and writers, ranging from feminist writer Betty Friedan through such historians as William H. McNeill, Joyce Appleby, and Carl Degler to sociobiologists Sarah Blaffer Hrdy and E.O. Wilson. A review in the Los Angeles Times Book Review called Eve’s Seed “a bestseller waiting to be discovered.” That publication later named it one of the “Best Books of 2001.”

McElvaine's views on the primacy of misunderstandings of the sexes in human history were featured in an article in the Arts and Ideas section of the New York Times and in a profile in the Chronicle of Higher Education. An international, interdisciplinary conference on the McElvaine Thesis, “Bridging the Great Divide: Robert S. McElvaine's Eve's Seed and the Quest to Bring Together Biology, Anthropology, Religion, and History,” was held in 2002.

In a 2017 New York Times interview, Margaret Atwood said that Eve’s Seed “is illuminating” on what she wrote about in The Handmaid’s Tale.

In the early 2000s, McElvaine returned to the era of the Great Depression with The Depression and New Deal: A History in Documents (Oxford University Press, 2000), and a brief biography, Franklin Delano Roosevelt, for Congressional Quarterly Press in 2002. He served as editor-in-chief of the two-volume Encyclopedia of the Great Depression (Macmillan Reference, 2004).

His 2008 book, Grand Theft Jesus: The Hijacking of Religion in America (Crown) accused the religious right of having "kidnapped Jesus". With reference to the presidency of George W. Bush, the Iraq War and the "prosperity gospel", and figures including Jerry Falwell, Ted Haggard, James Dobson and D. James Kennedy, McElvaine argued that the right has espoused a message that contradicts Jesus’ teachings.

McElvaine's latest book is the culmination of decades of intermittent research that he conducted between his other writing projects and then a full decade of steady work on the 1960s. The Times They Were a-Changin’ – 1964: The Year the Sixties Arrived and the Battle Lines of Today Were Drawn (Arcade, distributed by Simon & Schuster, 2022) weaves together the political, social, cultural, sexual, racial, economic and foreign policy (i.e., Vietnam) threads of what the author calls “the Long 1964,” from the John F. Kennedy assassination in late 1963 through mid-1965 to bring back to life one of the most revolutionary periods in American history. He argues that the struggle that threatens the survival of American democracy in the 2020s is fundamentally about whether to preserve and build upon the progressive changes that began in 1964 or to “take America back” to the time before 1964 when the United States was largely still “a white man’s country.”

=== Essayist ===
McElvaine's essays and opinion pieces appear frequently in such publications as the New York Times, Washington Post, Los Angeles Times, Wall Street Journal, Politico, New York Times Book Review, Newsweek, National Public Radio, The Nation, New York Daily News, NBC Think, Christian Science Monitor, Chicago Sun-Times, Chicago Tribune, Boston Globe, Baltimore Sun, Atlanta Journal-Constitution, San Francisco Chronicle, Washington Monthly, Huff Post, Chronicle Review, Christian Century, America, Medium, and Daily Kos. He writes an occasional series of essays, “Today through the Lens of Yesterday,” online.

=== Media and lecturing ===
McElvaine has been a guest on approximately 100 television and radio programs, including NBC's Today, ABC World News Tonight, NBC Nightly News, National Public Radio's All Things Considered and Morning Edition, PBS NewsHour, BBC television and radio, and the Studs Terkel Show.

He has served as historical consultant for several television programs, including the seven-episode PBS series The Great Depression.

== Books ==
- Down and Out in the Great Depression: Letters from the "Forgotten Man" (1983, 2008) ISBN 978-0807858912
- The Great Depression: America, 1929–1941 (1984, 1993, 2009) ISBN 978-0812910612
- The End of the Conservative Era: Liberalism After Reagan (1987) ISBN 978-0877959168
- Mario Cuomo: A Biography (1988) ISBN 978-0684189703
- What's Left?: A New Democratic Vision for America (1996) ISBN 978-1558506299
- The Great Depression: A History in Documents (2000) ISBN 978-0195104936
- Eve's Seed: Biology, the Sexes, and the Course of History (2001) ISBN 978-0071355285
- Franklin Delano Roosevelt (2002) ISBN 978-1568027029
- The Encyclopedia of the Great Depression (2004) ISBN 978-0028656861
- Grand Theft Jesus: The Hijacking of Religion in America (2008) ISBN 978-0307395788
- The Times They Were a-Changin' - 1964: The Year the Sixties Arrived and the Battle Lines of Today Were Drawn (2022) ISBN 978-1950994106
