= Great Slump =

Great Slump may refer to:

- Great Depression, a dramatic, worldwide economic downturn beginning in the late 1920s and lasting through the 1930s
- Great Slump (15th century), a dramatic economic downturn in England from the 1430s to the 1480s
- Lost Decade (Japan), a period of economic stagnation in Japan following the Japanese asset price bubble's collapse in late 1991 and early 1992

== See also ==
- The Great Depression (disambiguation)
