= Second Great Depression =

The Second Great Depression may refer to multiple topics, primarily about economics.

== Economics ==
- Great Recession, a period of general economic decline during the late 2000s and early 2010s
- COVID-19 recession, a recession during the COVID-19 pandemic.
  - 2020 stock market crash, a stock market crash kick-starting the COVID-19 recession.
- 2025 stock market crash, a stock market crash due to more aggressive tariffs than the 1930s.

== Others ==
- "The Second Great Depression", a song by Manic Street Preachers from Send Away the Tigers

== See also ==
- The Great Depression (disambiguation)
  - Great Depression, mostly during the 1930s
- Recession of 1937–38, an economic downturn that occurred during the Great Depression in the United States
