= Confusion Bay =

Studio album by Raunchy
- Released: 2004
- Recorded: July 2003
- Genres: Alternative metal; melodic death metal; industrial metal
- Length: 52:00
- Label: Nuclear Blast
- Producers: Jacob Hansen, Raunchy

Raunchy chronology
Velvet Noise (2001)	Confusion Bay (2004)	Death Pop Romance (2006)

Professional ratings
Review scores
Source	Rating
Allmusic	2.5/5 stars
Blabbermouth	9/10 stars
Metal Storm	6/10 stars
Rock Hard	8/10 stars
Metal.de	9/10 stars
Scream Magazine	5/6 stars

Confusion Bay is the second album by Danish metal band Raunchy. It was recorded at Hansen Studios in July 2003 and produced by Jacob Hansen. The album gained great reviews and is by many still considered to be the best Raunchy album.
During the recordings, Raunchy did a cover track of Faith No More's "From Out of Nowhere," which was released in 2007 on Velvet Noise Extended.

Cover and all promotion art is done by guitarist Lars Christensen.

In 2009, Confusion Bay and Velvet Noise were reissued through Metal Mind Productions as limited edition digipaks limited to 2000 copies. Both are remastered, and feature new liner notes.

== Track listing ==
No.	Title	Length
1.	"Join the Scene"	4:24
2.	"I Get What I See"	4:39
3.	"Summer of Overload"	4:11
4.	"Watch Out"	4:29
5.	"9 – 5"	4:00
6.	"Show Me Your Real Darkness"	5:19
7.	"Confusion Bay"	3:56
8.	"The Devil"	4:41
9.	"Insane"	4:44
10.	"Morning Rise and a Friday Night"	5:49
11.	"Bleeding#2"	5:53

== Videography ==
Year	Title	Director
2004	"Watch Out"	Anders Morgenthaler

== Personnel ==
- Lars Vognstrup – Vocals
- Jesper Tilsted – Guitars
- Lars Christensen – Guitars
- Jeppe Christensen – Keyboards, Vocals
- Jesper Kvist – Bass
- Morten Toft Hansen – Drums
