= High Tone Son of a Bitch =

American heavy rock band

- Origin: Oakland, California, U.S.
- Genres: stoner rock; doom metal; psychedelic rock; heavy metal
- Years active: 2002–2007, 2018–present
- Labels: Tee Pee; Ripple; Svart; Unknown Controller; Magnetic Eye

High Tone Son of a Bitch (often abbreviated HTSOB) is an American heavy metal band from Oakland, California, formed in the early 2000s by brothers Paul and Andrew Kott. The group blends stoner and desert rock, psychedelic hard rock, and doom metal, and have been associated with the Bay Area underground heavy music scene.

== History ==
High Tone Son of a Bitch formed in the early 2000s in the Bay Area, with the Kott brothers emerging from the earlier band Cruevo. Their debut EP Better You Than Me was released in 2003 and featured guest synthesizer from Dave Edwardson of Neurosis. A second EP, Velocipede, was recorded in 2004 but was not released at that time. In 2007, Andrew Kott died following a fall, and the band went on hiatus for more than a decade. During the hiatus, Paul Kott played in the Bay Area group Kalas with Matt Pike.

In 2018 Juan Herrera—Paul Kott's nephew and Andrew Kott's stepson, and recipient of a Latin Grammy nomination—encouraged Paul to restart HTSOB. The band returned by issuing Velocipede digitally and releasing the comeback EP Death of a New Day / Eye in the Sky in 2019. The EP received positive coverage from outlets including Ghost Cult Magazine and Revolver. In 2020 the band released Lifecycles: EPs of HTSOB with Tee Pee Records, which compiled remastered versions of Better You Than Me, Velocipede, Death of a New Day / Eye in the Sky, and the newly issued Wicked Threads!. The release was previewed by Invisible Oranges.

In 2022, HTSOB partnered with Ripple Music to release Live at the Hallowed Halls, a live-in-studio album recorded in Portland. The record was noted by multiple outlets; for example, Tinnitist called it "a thrilling live in the studio... instant classic". The album features guest appearances from several prominent heavy rock artists performing with the band on live in the studio. In 2025, the band contributed a cover of Nine Inch Nails' "Ruiner" to Magnetic Eye Records' The Downward Spiral (Redux), covered in outlets such as The Razor's Edge.

== Collaborations and guests ==
HTSOB has collaborated with a range of musicians from other underground heavy acts.

- Matt Pike – guest guitar on Wicked Threads! and guest guitar and vocals on Live at the Hallowed Halls.
- Dave Edwardson – synthesizer on Better You Than Me and Death of a New Day / Eye in the Sky.
- Rob Wrong – guest guitar on Live at the Hallowed Halls.
- Andrea Vidal – guest vocals on Live at the Hallowed Halls.
- Sonny Reinhardt – guitar on Death of a New Day / Eye in the Sky.
- John Brookhouse – collaborator on Wicked Threads!.
- Jake Navarra – collaborator on Live at the Hallowed Halls.

== Members ==
=== Founding members ===
- Paul Kott – guitar
- Andrew Kott – guitar
- Ron Nichols – bass
- Andee Connors – drums
- Scott Wagner – vocals

=== Current core lineup ===
- Russ Kent – vocals
- Paul Kott – guitar
- Patrick Peterson – guitar
- Billy Anderson – bass
- Matt Butler – drums
- Leslie Allred – keyboards, synthesizers

=== Former members ===
- Johann Zamorra – drums
- Chris Corona – guitar
- Joe Fucko – bass
- Bryce Shelton – keyboards
- Pamela Ausejo – guitar, vocals
- Eric Rancourt – drums

== Discography ==
=== EPs and albums ===
Year	Title	Type	Label(s)
2003	Better You Than Me	EP	Shifty, Throne, Unknown Controller
2004 (released 2018)	Velocipede	EP	Unknown Controller
2019	Death of a New Day / Eye in the Sky	EP	Unknown Controller
2020	Wicked Threads!	EP	Unknown Controller
2020	Lifecycles: EPs of HTSOB	Compilation	Tee Pee, Svart, Unknown Controller
2022	Live at the Hallowed Halls	Live album	Ripple Music

=== Compilation appearances ===
- "Ruiner" on The Downward Spiral (Redux) (Magnetic Eye, 2025).
