= Matt Pike =

American musician (born 1972)

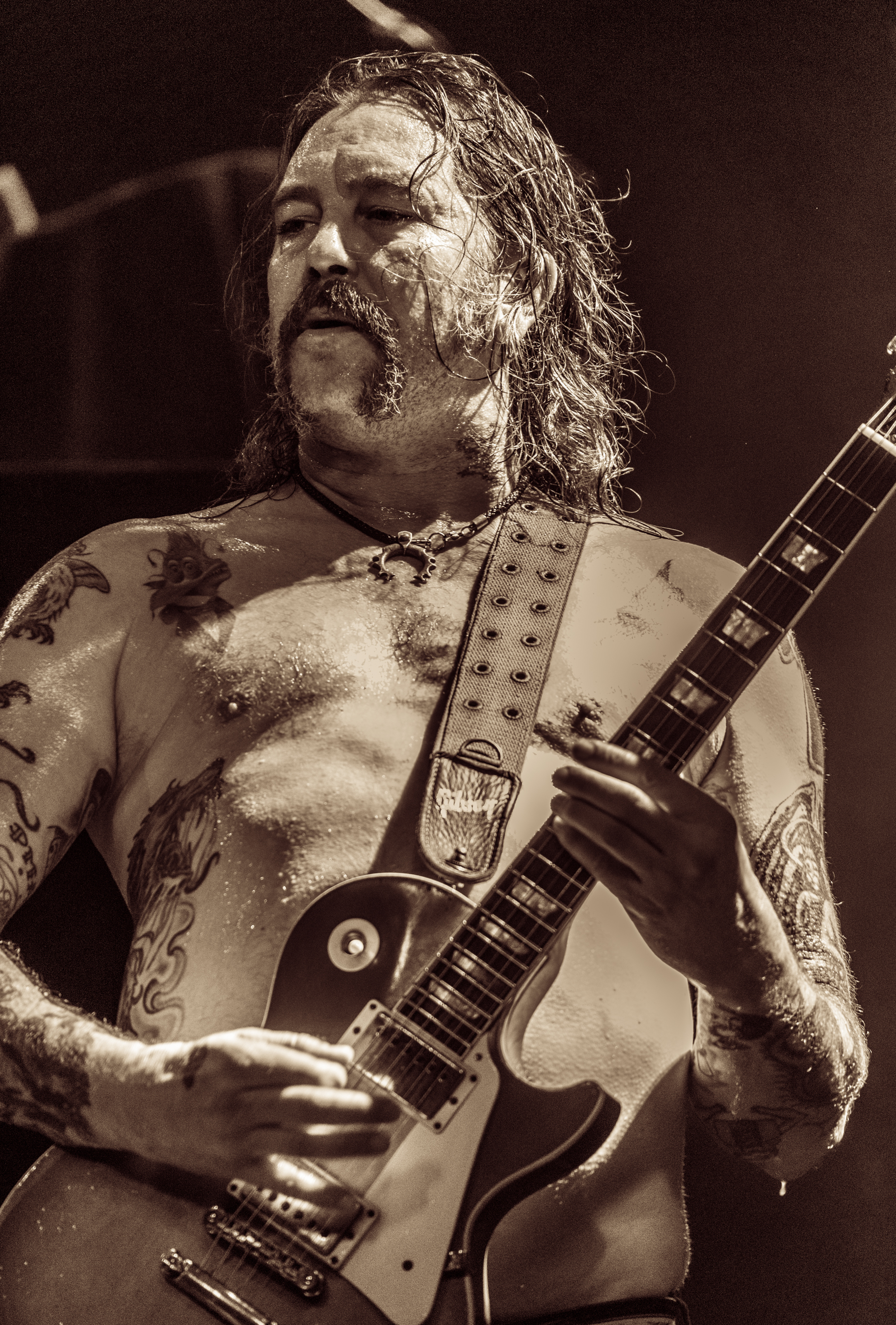
- Pike performing in 2016

Background information
- Born: June 3, 1972 (age 54); Southfield, Michigan, U.S.
- Genres: Stoner metal; doom metal; sludge metal; thrash metal
- Occupation: Musician
- Instruments: Guitar, vocals
- Years active: 1989–present
- Member of: High on Fire
- Formerly of: Asbestosdeath, Kalas, Sleep
- Spouse: Alyssa Maucere (m. 2019)
- Website: highonfire.com

Matthew Lance Pike (born June 3, 1972) is an American musician best known as the former guitarist of stoner/doom metal band Sleep and the current vocalist and guitarist of High on Fire. With High on Fire, Pike won the 2019 Grammy Award for Best Metal Performance for the song "Electric Messiah".

== Early life ==
Pike was born in Southfield, Michigan. He moved to California after spending time in military school while living with his mother in Golden, Colorado. Arriving in San Jose, he realized the hardcore punk and heavy metal scenes were more active than the ones in Colorado. He made friends, attended shows, and eventually joined the sludge metal band Asbestosdeath. When playing around the Bay Area they developed a much heavier and slower sound more akin to doom metal. The quartet soon gained a following and changed their name to Sleep.

== Career ==
=== Sleep ===
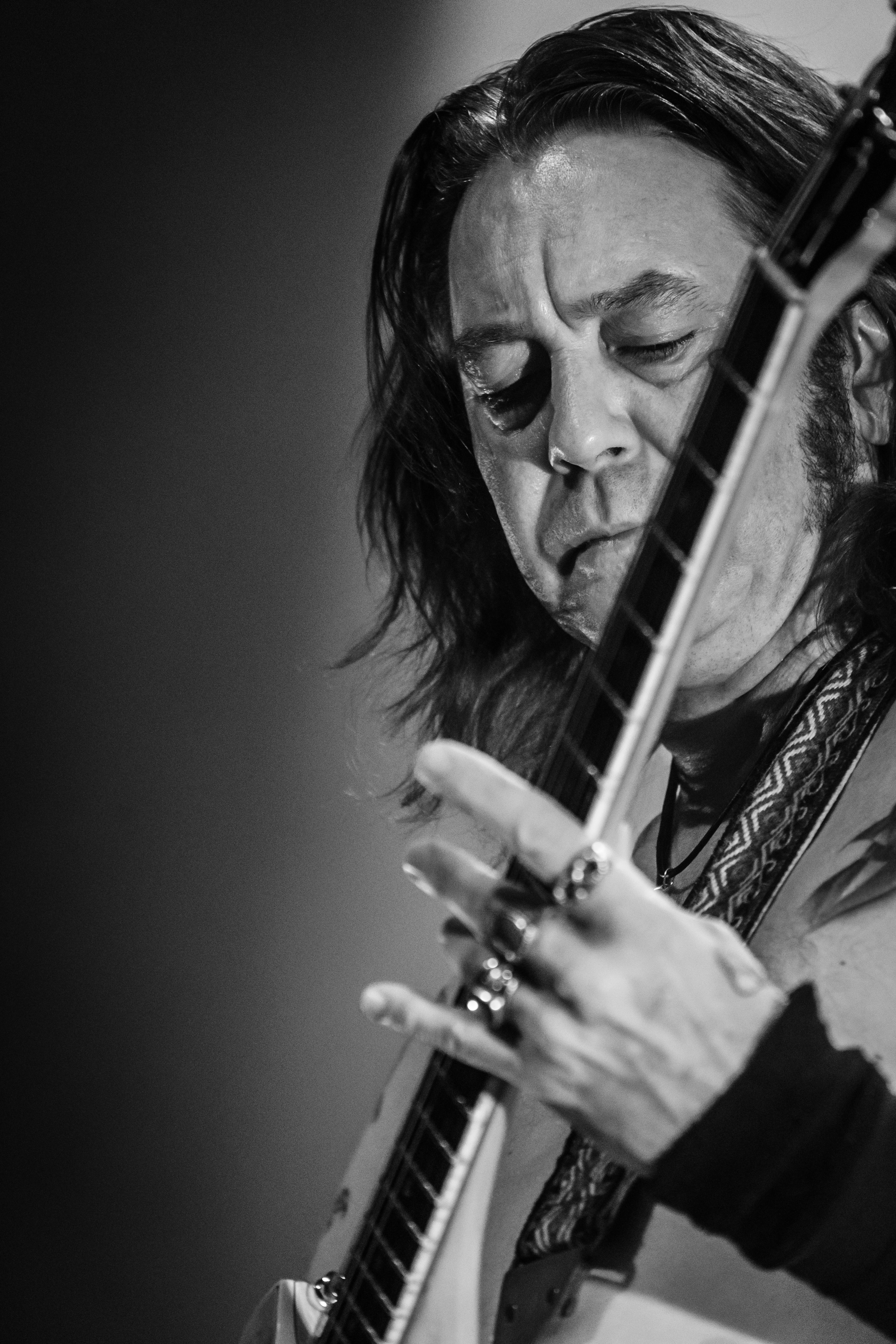
Pike performing with Sleep in 2019

When fellow Sleep guitarist Justin Marler quit the band, Sleep became a power trio. The band's second album, Sleep's Holy Mountain, illustrated Pike as a young Tony Iommi, playing Black Sabbath-styled riffs.

As a result of the increased press, the band's demographic and following widened greatly, and major label deals soon began surfacing. However, instead of following a path to mainstream exposure, the band fled further underground, turning down countless major label deals and submitting the one-song, full-length record Jerusalem in mid-1996. In 1997, the band called it quits after London Records refused to release the Dopesmoker/Jerusalem recordings and the pressure the members were experiencing became unbearable. Pike couldn't come to terms with the break-up and became depressed. He soon realized that his career as a musician was far from over, and began inviting people to jam in his garage. Deciding to work in a power trio again, he brought in Desmond Kensel (drums) and an old friend George Rice (bass) to play in his new band. Within six months, the jams were headed to fruition and High on Fire was developing from a simple need to play guitar again.

=== High on Fire ===
While Pike's guitar tone remained largely the same in his new band, High on Fire, he began playing faster and more aggressively than he had in Sleep. Pike handles both guitar and vocal duties in the band, as well as writing a bulk of the material.

=== Kalas ===
Pike was the frontman of the Bay Area psychedelic-metal band Kalas (formerly Scum Angel) that featured members of Econochrist, Samiam, Cruevo, and High Tone Son of a Bitch. Pike set aside the guitar for Kalas, as they already featured two guitarists; his vocals were surprisingly melodic, especially compared to his snarling growls in High on Fire. After only releasing a self-titled album, Kalas split by October 2006.

== Other work ==
As a guest star, Pike provided the voice of a Klokateer in the Adult Swim rock comedy Metalocalypse.

== Personal life ==
In 2012, Pike made his problems with addiction public as he dropped off the Rockstar Mayhem Festival during the summer and went into rehab. He cited health problems caused by his heavy consumption of alcohol as the reason. He admitted to having "fallen off the wagon" a few times since. In addition to this, he has admitted to suffering from bipolar disorder, and has sustained bodily injuries from relentless years of touring.

In 2018, Pike's band High on Fire announced they would be cancelling their upcoming tour due to Pike needing a partial amputation of one of his toes. Again on January 7, 2019, they announced via their Instagram that High on Fire would be cancelling their 2019 Electric Messiah tour because of Pike's risk of losing his big toe or part of his foot, due to complications from diabetes.

On August 17, 2019, Pike married musician and tattoo artist Alyssa Maucere in a small ceremony in Las Vegas. He has a daughter from a prior relationship, through whom he has one granddaughter.

== Discography ==
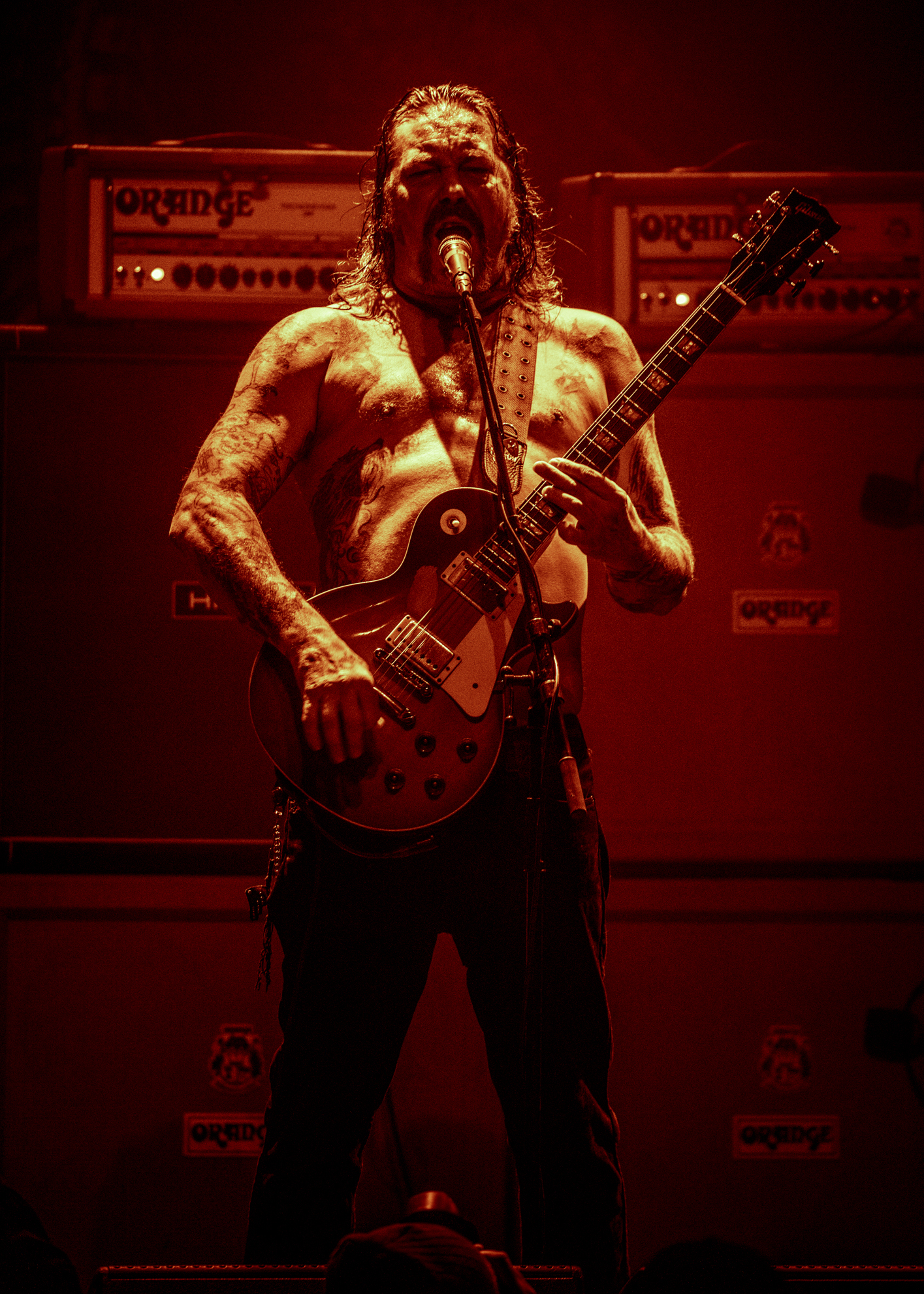
Pike with High on Fire, 2016

Sleep

- 1991: Volume One
- 1992: Volume Two (EP)
- 1992: Sleep's Holy Mountain
- 1999: Jerusalem
- 2003: Dopesmoker
- 2014: The Clarity (single)
- 2018: The Sciences
- 2018: Leagues Beneath (single)
- 2019: Vault Package #39 – Sleep Live at Third Man Records
- 2022: Vault Package #52 – Sleep Dopesmoker

High on Fire

- 2000: The Art of Self Defense
- 2002: Surrounded by Thieves
- 2005: Blessed Black Wings
- 2005: Live from the Relapse Contamination Festival (live album)
- 2007: Death Is This Communion
- 2010: Snakes for the Divine
- 2012: De Vermis Mysteriis
- 2015: Luminiferous
- 2018: Electric Messiah
- 2024: Cometh the Storm

Asbestosdeath

- 1990: Dejection (EP)
- 1990: Unclean (EP)
- 2007: Unclean Dejection

Kalas

- 2006: Kalas

Pike vs. the Automaton

- 2022: Pike vs. the Automaton
