= Death Pop Romance =

Studio album by Raunchy
- Released: February 20, 2006
- Recorded: July 2005
- Genres: Metalcore, industrial metal, melodic death metal, alternative metal
- Length: 48:34
- Label: Lifeforce Records
- Producers: Jacob Hansen, Raunchy

Raunchy chronology
| Confusion Bay (2004) | Death Pop Romance (2006) | Wasteland Discotheque (2008) |

Professional ratings
Review scores
| Source | Rating |
|---|---|
| Allmusic | 3.5/5 stars |
| Metal Storm | 7.5/10 stars |
| Rock Hard | 8.5/10 stars |
| Metal.de | 7/10 stars |

Death Pop Romance is the Danish band Raunchy's third album, released in 2006. It is their first with the vocalist Kasper Thomsen, who replaced Lars Vognstrup after Raunchy's 2004 album Confusion Bay.

== Track list ==
1. "This Legend Forever" – 4:24
2. "Abandon Your Hope" – 4:43
3. "Phantoms" – 5:01
4. "The Curse of Bravery" – 4:20
5. "Remembrance" – 5:21
6. "Live the Myth" – 5:36
7. "City of Hurt" – 5:02
8. "Persistence" – 4:22
9. "The Velvet Remains" – 4:16
10. "Farewell to Devotion" – 5:29

== Videography ==
| Year | Title | Director |
|---|---|---|
| 2008 | "Phantoms" | |
