= Wasteland Discotheque =

Studio album by Raunchy
- Released: 30 June 2008
- Studio: Hansen Studios
- Genres: Metalcore, melodic death metal, industrial metal, alternative metal
- Length: 53:05
- Label: Lifeforce Records
- Producers: Jacob Hansen, Raunchy

Raunchy chronology
| Death Pop Romance (2006) | Wasteland Discotheque (2008) | A Discord Electric (2010) |

Professional ratings
Review scores
| Source | Rating |
|---|---|
| Blabbermouth | 9/10 |
| Metal.de | 8/10 |
| Rock Hard | 8/10 |
| Vampster | Favourable |

Wasteland Discotheque is Danish band Raunchy's fourth album. It was released on 30 June 2008.

== Track listing ==
All tracks are written by Raunchy, except where noted.

| No. | Title | Writer(s) | Length |
|---|---|---|---|
| 1. | "This Blackout Is Your Apocalypse" | | 2:20 |
| 2. | "Somewhere Along the Road" | | 4:12 |
| 3. | "The Bash" | | 4:41 |
| 4. | "Warriors" | | 4:14 |
| 5. | "Straight to Hell" | | 3:40 |
| 6. | "Welcome the Storm" | | 4:17 |
| 7. | "Wasteland Discotheque" | | 4:19 |
| 8. | "Somebody's Watching Me" | Rockwell | 3:55 |
| 9. | "A Heavy Burden" | Raunchy, Lars Vognstrup | 4:48 |
| 10. | "To the Lighthouse" | | 5:15 |
| 11. | "Showdown Recovery" | | 4:25 |
| 12. | "The Comfort in Leaving" | | 7:59 |
| Total length: | | | 53:05 |

== Videography ==
| Year | Title | Director |
|---|---|---|
| 2009 | "Warriors" | Andreas Krohn |

== Personnel ==
- Kasper Thomsen – Vocals
- Jesper Tilsted – Guitars, Keyboards
- Lars Christensen – Guitars
- Jeppe Christensen – Keyboards, Vocals
- Jesper Kvist – Bass
- Morten Toft Hansen – Drums
