= The Great Depression: America, 1929–1941 =

Book by Robert S. McElvaine

The Great Depression: America, 1929-1941
- First edition
- Author: Robert S. McElvaine
- Language: English
- Subject: The Great Depression
- Genre: non-fiction
- Publisher: Times Books / Random House-Three Rivers
- Publication date: 1984
- Publication place: United States
- Pages: 402
- ISBN: 978-0-8129-2327-8

The Great Depression: America, 1929–1941 (ISBN 978-0-8129-2327-8) is a 1984 history of the Great Depression by acclaimed historian Robert S. McElvaine. In this interpretive history, McElvaine discusses the causes and the results of the worst depression in American history, covering the time from 1929 to 1941. He examines the causes of this cataclysmic event, its impact on the American people, and the political, governmental, and cultural responses to it. He comes down firmly in favor of the "demand-side" argument that maldistribution of income in the 1920s, having left the bulk of potential consumers with too small a share of national income to buy all that mass production was putting on the market was the principal cause of the collapse. Building on his innovative use of letters written by "ordinary" Americans during the Depression that were collected in his first book, Down and Out in the Great Depression, McElvaine takes readers into the experience of Depression victims to an extent never before achieved.

== Literary significance and reception ==
McElvaine received high praise for his work. Arthur M. Schlesinger Jr. called it "fair-minded, incisive, thoroughly informed, and eminently readable." In The New York Times Book Review, Morris Dickstein wrote, "It would be hard to find a fairer or more balanced account of how the American people and their leaders learned to grapple with their greatest economic crisis." "Robert McElvaine's lively account is unique," said historian William E. Leuchtenburg. "Unlike authors who limit their attention to Roosevelt or the New Deal, McElvaine offers a sweeping view of the Great Depression and its impact—on women as well as men, black as well as white, on popular culture, especially the film, and, most ambitiously, on American values." Business Week called the book "at once a thorough work of scholarship, a lively story, and a highly original feat of analysis that has a good deal of contemporary relevance."

The book was among the first to use popular culture, especially film, as an important resource in understanding the mood of a time. The book has stayed constantly in print since its publication. A second edition was published in 1993, coinciding with the eight-part PBS television series, The Great Depression, for which this book was a major resource. A 25th-anniversary edition, with a comprehensive new introduction comparing the circumstances leading up to the financial collapse of 2008 with those in the 1920s that led to the Great Depression, was published by Three Rivers, an imprint of Crown Publishing, late in 2009.
