= Raunchy (band) =

Danish metal band

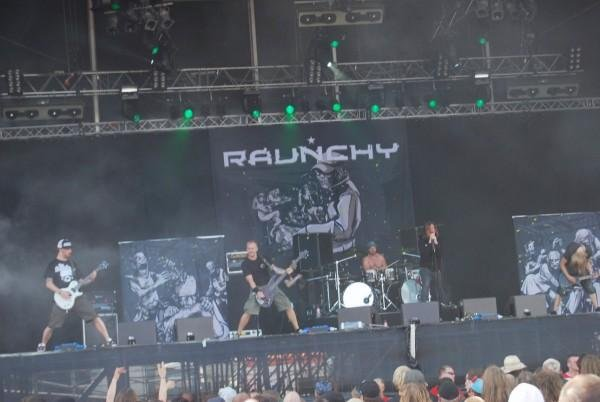
- Raunchy performing at With Full Force 2009

Background information
- Origin: Denmark
- Genres: Alternative metal, industrial metal, melodic death metal, metalcore
- Years active: 1992–present
- Labels: Lifeforce, Nuclear Blast, Drug(s)
- Members: Mike Semesky; Lars Christensen; Jesper Andreas Tilsted; Jesper Kvist; Jeppe Christensen; Morten Toft Hansen
- Past members: Lars Vognstrup; Kasper Thomsen

Raunchy is a Danish metal band formed in 1992. They have released six studio albums and are currently signed to Mighty Music.

== History ==
=== 1992–2002: Beginnings ===
Raunchy was founded in 1992 by Jesper Tilsted, Jesper Kvist, and Morten Toft Hansen, who started playing mostly covers from bands such as Metallica and Slayer. Lars Vognstrup and Lars Christensen joined the band in 1994, and in 1995 they record their first demo, at Borsing Recordings in Århus. The song "Space Story" from the demo was later released on the compilation CD Extremity Rising vol. 1, a rock compilation from Serious Entertainment. Two demos (and two more Extremity Rising inclusions later) the band finally got their record deal, with Mighty Music's sub label Drug(s) in 2000. A few months later, Raunchy entered the Aabenraa Studio with producer Jacob Hansen to record Velvet Noise. In 2001 the album was released in Scandinavia and was very well received by the press. After the release, keyboardist and supporting vocalist Jeppe Christensen joined the band.

=== 2002–2013: Confusion Bay, international success ===
The year 2002 proved to be crucial for the band: as the first Danish band ever, Raunchy signed a contract with one of the world biggest metal labels, Nuclear Blast, releasing Velvet Noise in Europe. Raunchy played at the German festival Summerbreeze. They recorded a cover of Wham!'s "Last Christmas" and a new song called "Decemberklar" for Denmark's National radio, produced by Tue Madsen at Antfarm Studios. The songs proved to be extremely popular. In 2003 Velvet Noise was released in North America, and in the summer the second album, Confusion Bay, was recorded, again with producer Jacob Hansen.

The year 2004 started off with singer Lars Vognstrup leaving the band. Kasper Thomsen (from The Arcane Order, then Scavenger) was recruited as the new lead singer to replace Lars. In February Confusion Bay was released. An animated video for the track "Watch Out" was made by the critically acclaimed director Anders Morgenthaler and the video received airplay on channels like VIVA+ and MTV2. The band performed a whole concert live on Danish National Radio, and in August the band performed at the Wacken Open Air in front of 4000 fans.

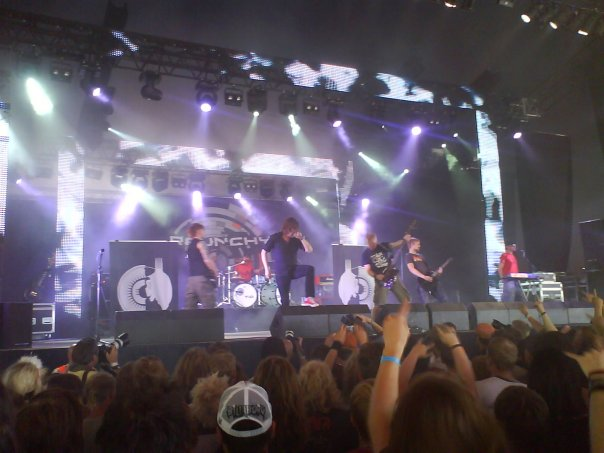
Raunchy live at 2008's Roskilde Festival

In 2005 Raunchy signed to a new label, Lifeforce Records and began recording of Death Pop Romance in summer 2005. At the end of the year the band performed at the Danish Metal Awards. The show was broadcast live on the Danish radio and marks the band's third radio appearance. Death Pop Romance was released in early 2006, where it received good reviews among critics. Raunchy supported American heavy metal band Soulfly on all German tour dates. The band also played at the popular With Full Force festival in Leipzig in front of 10 000 fans. In 2006, the band continued to tour to promote Death Pop Romance along with support gigs such as Ill Niño and Hatebreed. The band embarked on a full-length European tour called Danish Dynamite Tour, together with Hatesphere and Volbeat, and played at 2008's Roskilde Festival.

In summer 2008 Raunchy released their fourth album Wasteland Discotheque. The album was generally well received among the press. In late 2008 Raunchy went on a small tour with Volbeat in Germany. In April 2009, almost a year after Wasteland Discotheque was released, Raunchy did a music video for the track "Warriors", directed by Andreas Krohn, after that they went on a tour called "Weekend Warriors Tour", in Denmark and Sweden, and in July and August the band played at the big metal festivals With Full Force and Summer Breeze Open Air.

Their fifth album, A Discord Electric, was released in September 2010.

=== 2013–2021: Diminished activity ===
In March 2013, Kasper Thomsen left the band; both parties stated that the split was amicable. At the same time, it was announced that their new vocalist was Mike Semesky (formerly of The HAARP Machine, Intervals). The band also stated that they would be entering the studio later on in the year and would be touring in July and October 2013. Mike Semesky later commented saying that it was "a dream come true" to have been given the opportunity to sing for the band.

In late September 2014, Raunchy announced their sixth studio album, Vices. Virtues. Visions., and in October they were one of the first bands to be announced for the 2015 Copenhell lineup. The album was released in November 2014.

=== 2021–present: Return and Prisoner ===
17 June 2021 marked the first time in almost seven years since Raunchy shared any new music, in the form of a two-minute video on their official Facebook page captioned: "We are proud to reveal that drums for our 7th album are now recorded – Morten did a great job" (followed by a string of emojis and further text), showcasing their drummer Morten "Molle" Toft Hansen tracking drums for their upcoming album. A day later on 18 June, they shared another video clip captioned "Work in progress…" in which new music can be heard, this time showcasing vocals from their two singers Michael "Mike" Semesky and Jeppe Christensen. The album is slated to release in 2026.

On 26 June 2026, the band announced their seventh album, Prisoner, which was released on 14 August.

== Side projects from band members ==
=== Vega Nova (2010–2015, 2020–present) ===
Vega Nova is an electro hard rock act from Denmark. First active in 2010s as a side-project from then primary band Raunchy, members Jesper Tilsted (guitar, synth, programming) and Jeppe Christensen (vocals, synth, guitar, programming) released their debut album in 2012. 2020 marked the return of Vega Nova.

==== 2010–2015: Inception, debut single, debut album, and debut live show ====
Vega Nova started their musical journey with the recording of their debut album "Lovesongs for the Dead" in 2010. Their debut single "Daylight" was released in November 2012 through MondoTunes followed by the release of their debut album in January 2013 through the same record label. All of the songs from the album were uploaded to their official YouTube channel starting with a one minute sample of daylight in late September 2012. As of 10 July 2021, their most viewed song on their channel is "Daylight" with 5,938 views.

In October 2015, Vega Nova played their first ever live show with fellow Raunchy bandmate Morten "Molle" Toft Hansen, which they hinted may also be their last.

==== 2015–2020: Hiatus ====
Vega Nova remained dormant after their live show for half a decade for reasons unknown.

==== 2020–present: Return, release of multiple new singles ====
In May 2020, Vega Nova announced the release of their first single in almost 8 years, "Waiting For Light". This was followed by a flurry of following singles released throughout 2020 and 2021 through various music streaming platforms, including "Lost" in June 2020, "Easy Summer Days" in October 2020, "Take My Money" in November 2020, a cover of "Love in Siberia" by the Danish 1980s synthpop duo Laban in December 2020, "Bleed Out" in April 2021, "One More Chance" in May 2021.

== Members ==
=== Current ===
- Lars Christensen – guitar (1994–present)
- Jesper Andreas Tilsted – guitar, keyboards (1994–present)
- Jesper Kvist – bass (1994–present)
- Morten Toft Hansen – drums (1994–present)
- Jeppe Christensen – keyboards, vocals (2001–present)
- Mike Semesky – vocals (2013–present)

=== Former ===
- Lars Vognstrup – vocals (1994–2004)
- Kasper Thomsen – vocals (2004–2013)

=== Tour ===
- Victor Salomonsen – guitar (2010)
- Niels Kofod – synthesizers, vocals (2010)
- Lasse Sivertsen – vocals (2012, 2013, 2016)
- Flemming C. Lund – guitar (2013)

== Discography ==
=== Studio albums ===
- Velvet Noise (2001)
- Confusion Bay (2004)
- Death Pop Romance (2006)
- Wasteland Discotheque (2008)
- A Discord Electric (2010)
- Vices.Virtues.Visions. (2014)
- Prisoner (2026)

=== Re-releases ===
- Velvet Noise Extended (2007)

== Videography ==
Year	Title	Director
2004	"Watch Out"	Anders Morgenthaler
2008	"Phantoms"	
2009	"Warriors"	Andreas Krohn
2013	"Nght Prty"	Lars Christensen
