= Velvet Noise =

Studio album by Raunchy
- Released: 2001
- Recorded: 2000
- Genre: Industrial metal, metalcore, alternative metal
- Length: 45:32
- Label: Drug(s); Nuclear Blast
- Producer: Jacob Hansen, Raunchy

Raunchy chronology
Velvet Noise (2001)	Confusion Bay (2004)

Professional ratings
Review scores
Source	Rating
Allmusic	3/5 stars
Blabbermouth	9/10 stars
BW&BK	9/10 stars
Chronicles of Chaos	8/10 stars
Metal.de	8/10 stars
Rock Hard	8.5/10 stars

Velvet Noise is the debut album of Danish metal band Raunchy. The album was first released as a digipack version by Mighty Music's sub label Drug(s). The second edition was released by Nuclear Blast (2002) and features the bonus track "Never be", which is taken from the 3. demo that got them the record deal. Additionally, yet another version called Velvet Noise Extended was released in March 2007.

In 2009, Velvet Noise and Confusion Bay were reissued through Metal Mind Productions as limited edition digipaks limited to 2000 copies. Both are remastered, and feature new liner notes.

== Track listing ==
No.	Title	Length
1.	"Twelve Feet Tall"	4:48
2.	"Bleeding"	4:36
3.	"Drive"	2:13
4.	"Tonight"	3:17
5.	"Leech"	6:37
6.	"My Game"	3:36
7.	"Crack of Dawn"	6:47
8.	"Out of Sight"	3:54
9.	"This Is Not an Exit"	7:54
10.	"Never Be"	6:28
