= Electric Messiah =

Studio album by High on Fire
- Released: October 5, 2018
- Recorded: 2017–2018
- Genre: Stoner metal; sludge metal; thrash metal
- Length: 56:52
- Label: eOne
- Producer: Kurt Ballou

High on Fire chronology
Luminiferous (2015)	Electric Messiah (2018)	Cometh the Storm (2024)

Singles from Electric Messiah
- 1. "Electric Messiah" Released: August 6, 2018; 2. "Spewn from the Earth" Released: October 3, 2018

Professional ratings
Aggregate scores
Source	Rating
Metacritic	83/100
Review scores
Source	Rating
AllMusic	4/5 stars
The A.V. Club	A−
Exclaim!	8/10
Pitchfork	7.8/10
PopMatters	7/10

Electric Messiah is the eighth studio album by American metal band High on Fire, released on October 5, 2018, through Entertainment One Music. It is the band's third album to be produced by Kurt Ballou, and it serves as a tribute to Lemmy Kilmister of the band Motörhead. On August 6, 2018, Electric Messiah's title track was released early for streaming. On October 3, 2018, the band released "Spewn from the Earth" as the album's second single. The song "Electric Messiah" won the Best Metal Performance at the 2019 Grammy Awards. It is the band's last album with founding drummer Des Kensel, who announced his departure in July 2019.

== Background ==
In July 2018, a few months after High on Fire frontman Matt Pike's other primary band, Sleep, released its comeback album, Electric Messiah was announced. Pike called it "the best album we've ever done, by far", and described its flow as "one stream of High on Fire consciousness".

== Track listing ==
No.	Title	Length
1.	"Spewn from the Earth"	3:59
2.	"Steps of the Ziggurat / House of Enlil"	9:21
3.	"Electric Messiah"	4:16
4.	"Sanctioned Annihilation"	10:29
5.	"The Pallid Mask"	5:15
6.	"God of the Godless"	5:20
7.	"Freebooter"	4:57
8.	"The Witch and the Christ"	6:32
9.	"Drowning Dog"	6:43
Total length:		56:52

== Personnel ==
High on Fire

- Matt Pike – lead vocals, guitars
- Jeff Matz – bass, backing vocals
- Des Kensel – drums, backing vocals

Technical personnel

- Kurt Ballou – production

== Accolades ==
Publication	Accolade	Rank	Ref.
The A.V. Club	The Best Metal Albums of 2018	N/A	
Consequence of Sound	Top 25 Metal/Hard Rock Albums of 2018	20	
Kerrang!	Top 50 Albums of 2018	38	
Loudwire	Top 30 Metal Albums of 2018	16	
Revolver	Top 30 Albums of 2018	15	

== Awards ==
- Grammy Awards
  - Best Metal Performance "Electric Messiah" by High on Fire

== Charts ==
Chart (2018)	Peak position
Belgian Albums (Ultratop Flanders)	184
Scottish Albums (OCC)	73
US Billboard 200	127
US Top Hard Rock Albums (Billboard)	5
US Top Rock Albums (Billboard)	23
