= Cometh the Storm =

Studio album by High on Fire
- Released: April 19, 2024
- Studio: GodCity (Salem, Massachusetts)
- Genre: Sludge metal; stoner metal
- Length: 57:42
- Label: MNRK Heavy
- Producer: Kurt Ballou; High on Fire

High on Fire chronology
Electric Messiah (2019)	Cometh the Storm (2024)

"Mostly, it's about reinventing ourselves: building our machine back up after a few years away. But it's also about [what's been happening in the world]. People are wandering around, talking about nuclear war as if it's casual – 'Oh, it's just nuclear war!' Environmentalism doesn't seem to be doing any good for the environment – or us. It feels like there has been a big storm building since before COVID and now shit's hitting the fan. We're just singing about the times!"

—Frontman Matt Pike on themes of Cometh the Storm

Cometh the Storm is the ninth studio album by American heavy metal band High on Fire, released on April 19, 2024, through MNRK Heavy. It marks their first album with Coady Willis of Big Business & The Melvins on drums since the departure of co-founder Des Kensel in July 2019. It follows a five-and-a-half-year gap from Electric Messiah and mixes the band's previous sludge metal and stoner metal genres with Turkish folk music and Middle Eastern music. It has received positive reviews from critics.

== Reception ==
Writing at Blabbermouth.net, Dom Lawson rated this album an 8.5 out of 10, stating that High on Fire "deliver the punishment that their admirers crave". In Kerrang!, Nick Russell scored Cometh the Storm 4 out of 5, summing up, "when [High on Fire] stampede at you like this, when you can hear their blood pumping and smell their breath, there are few bands on Earth who can match them". Max Morin of Metal Injection rated this release an 8 out of 10, stating that the music "avoids the pitfalls that many of High On Fire's imitators have stumbled into, mainly letting the music relax into a slow motion dirge" and it "keeps the momentum going with drum fills, crashing cymbals and an absolutely ripping guitar solo". Another 4 out of 5 came from Mandy Scythe of MetalSucks who wrote that "there really isn't a dull moment on this album, as it almost acts as a retrospective of what the band has done so far and takes you through a lot of different crucial eras of their development". Online retailer Qobuz named this Album of the Week and critic Eli Enis ended that the band "sound as heavy, gnarly, and gloriously sludgy as they ever have". In The Shepherd Express, Jon M. Gilbertson called this release "a manifestation of [vocalist Matt Pike's] best dark side". Editors at Stereogum chose this as Album of the Week, where critic Chris DeVille stated that "stoner metal is... rarely so dynamic" and summed up that "it's right in this band's sweet spot: grotesque enough for the most dedicated hesher, but bracingly immediate enough to sweep up the heavy metal dilettante in its current".

A June 4 roundup of the best albums of the year so far by Consequence of Sound included this release at 3 and Jon Hadusek called it "all-killer-no-filler [that] is the most inspired and varied record from the sludge metal band in over a decade". On June 17 Revolver published the best 20 albums of 2024, including this album as "a maelstrom of overdriven hypno-riffs, cascading drums, and familiarly throaty bellows from the mighty Matt Pike".

== Track listing ==
1. "Lambsbread" – 5:45
2. "Burning Down" – 6:13
3. "Trismegistus" – 5:37
4. "Cometh the Storm" – 6:12
5. "Karanlık Yol" – 3:47 (Turkish for "Dark Road")
6. "Sol's Golden Curse" – 4:52
7. "The Beating" – 2:29
8. "Tough Guy" – 3:44
9. "Lightning Beard" – 3:34
10. "Hunting Shadows" – 5:41
11. "Darker Fleece" – 9:59

== Personnel ==
High on Fire

- Jeff Matz – bass guitar, guitar, baglama, Mellotron, percussion, audio engineering, production
- Matt Pike – guitar, vocals, production
- Coady Willis – drums, percussion, vocals, engineering, production

Additional personnel

- Kurt Ballou – recording, mixing, production
- Rich Doucette – dilruba on "Karanlik Yol"
- Alan Douches – audio mastering
- Brandon Eggleston – engineering
- Zach Weeks – engineering

== Chart performance ==
Cometh the Storm debuted at 19 on the Billboard Top Hard Rock Albums chart in the United States.

== See also ==
- 2024 in American music
- 2024 in heavy metal music
- List of 2024 albums
