= De Vermis Mysteriis (album) =

Studio album by High on Fire
- Released: April 3, 2012
- Studios: Godcity Recording Studio in Salem, MA
- Genres: Stoner metal, sludge metal, thrash metal
- Length: 52:19
- Label: E1 Music
- Producer: Kurt Ballou

High on Fire chronology
Snakes for the Divine (2010)	De Vermis Mysteriis (2012)	Luminiferous (2015)

Singles from De Vermis Mysteriis
- 1. "Fertile Green" Released: March 1, 2012

Professional ratings
Aggregate scores
Source	Rating
Metacritic	85/100
Review scores
Source	Rating
AllMusic	4/5 stars
Alternative Press	4/5 stars
The A.V. Club	B+
Consequence of Sound	4/5 stars
MetalSucks	4/5 stars
Pitchfork	8.2/10
PopMatters	9/10
Q	4/5 stars
Spin	8/10
Sputnikmusic	4.5/5

De Vermis Mysteriis is the sixth studio album by American heavy metal band High on Fire. Cover art was done by tattoo artist Tim Lehii.

== Theme ==
According to frontman Matt Pike,

The album's title (translation: "The Mysteries of the Worm,") is a nod to a fictional grimoire conceived by the late, great Psycho author Robert Bloch in 1935 and later incorporated into horror master H.P. Lovecraft's renowned Cthulhu Mythos. "It's a concept record, a little bit," Pike offers. "I got this idea about Jesus Christ and the Immaculate Conception: What if Jesus had a twin who died at birth to give Jesus his life? And then what if the twin became a time traveler right then? He lives his life only going forward until he finds this scroll from an ancient Chinese alchemist who derived a serum out of the black lotus—which is actually in Robert E. Howard's 'Conan' stories—and then he starts traveling back in time. He can see the past through his ancestors' eyes, but his enemies can kill him if they kill the ancestor that he's seeing through at the time. Basically, he keeps waking up in other people's bodies at bad times. It's kinda like that old TV show Quantum Leap. Kurt actually pointed that out to me after I told him the idea. But whatever—time travel is a killer concept."

== Track listing ==
All tracks are written by High on Fire.

No.	Title	Length
1.	"Serums of Liao"	6:01
2.	"Bloody Knuckles"	4:16
3.	"Fertile Green"	4:45
4.	"Madness of an Architect"	6:57
5.	"Samsara"	3:42
6.	"Spiritual Rites"	5:08
7.	"King of Days"	7:09
8.	"De Vermis Mysteriis"	3:50
9.	"Romulus and Remus"	5:04
10.	"Warhorn"	5:27
11.	"Speak in Tongues" (bonus track)	5:46
Total length:		52:19

== Personnel ==
High on Fire

- Matt Pike – guitars, vocals
- Jeff Matz – bass
- Des Kensel – drums

Additional Personnel

- Kurt Ballou – producer, recording, mixing, additional guitars on "Warhorn" and "Samsara"
- Paul Grosso – art direction, design
- Tim Lehi – cover art and art direction
- Alan Douches – mastering
- Tom Couture – photography
- Ashley Redshaw – additional vocals on "Spiritual Rites"
