= A Discord Electric =

Studio album by Raunchy
- Released: September 20, 2010
- Genres: Melodic death metal, industrial metal, alternative metal
- Length: 1:04:45
- Label: Lifeforce Records

Raunchy chronology
Wasteland Discotheque (2008)	A Discord Electric (2010)	Vices.Virtues.Visions. (2014)

A Discord Electric is the fifth album from Danish metal band Raunchy. It was released on September 20, 2010 in Denmark, October 8 in Germany, Austria, and Switzerland, October 11 in the rest of Europe, and October 12 in the US.

== Reception ==
Professional ratings
Review scores
Source	Rating
About.com	3.5/5 stars
Blabbermouth	7.5/10
GAFFA	5/6 stars
Lords of Metal	7.5/10

== Track listing ==
No.	Title	Length
1.	"Dim the Lights and Run"	5:25
2.	"Rumors of Worship"	5:15
3.	"Nght Prty"	4:59
4.	"Street Emperor"	5:33
5.	"Blueprints for Lost Sounds"	5:45
6.	"Shake Your Grave"	5:22
7.	"Tiger Crown"	5:56
8.	"Big Truth" (featuring Dúné)	4:01
9.	"The Great Depression"	4:44
10.	"The Yeah Thing"	5:21
11.	"Ire Vampire"	5:18
12.	"Gunslingers and Tombstones"	7:14

Japanese edition bonus track
No.	Title	Length
13.	"Big Truth" (Dúné remix)

== Personnel ==
- Kasper Thomsen – Vocals
- Jesper Tilsted – Guitars
- Lars Christensen – Guitars
- Jeppe Christensen – Keyboards, clean vocals, lead vocals on "Dim the Lights and Run"
- Jesper Kvist – Bass
- Morten Toft Hansen – Drums
