= Blessed Black Wings =

Studio album by High on Fire
- Released: February 1, 2005
- Recorded: Electrical Audio (Chicago, Illinois)
- Genre: Stoner metal, sludge metal
- Length: 53:23
- Label: Relapse Records
- Producer: Steve Albini

High on Fire chronology
| Surrounded by Thieves (2002) | Blessed Black Wings (2005) | Death Is This Communion (2007) |

Professional ratings
Review scores
| Source | Rating |
|---|---|
| AllMusic | 3/5 stars |
| Pitchfork Media | (7.3/10) |
| PopMatters | 4/5 stars |

Blessed Black Wings is the third studio album by American heavy metal band High on Fire. It would be the only with Joe Preston on bass who would be replaced by Jeff Matz.

The tracks "The Face of Oblivion" and "Cometh Down Hessian" are based on stories by horror fiction author H. P. Lovecraft, At the Mountains of Madness and The Hound, respectively. The vinyl version was released as a double LP and contains a bonus track, "Rapid Fire", originally by Judas Priest.

Blessed Black Wings was voted 48th in the '50 Greatest Albums of the 21st Century' by Kerrang! magazine. In 2013, the staff of Loudwire included the title track's main riff in their list of "the 10 Best Metal Riffs of the 2000s".

== Reception ==
Blessed Black Wings was released to positive reception. Critics in particular praised Steve Albini's production of the album, with criticism mainly being pointed towards Matt Pike's vocals. Eduardo Rivadavia of AllMusic acknowledged Pike's appreciation of Celtic Frost noting the influence of the band in the closing instrumental "Sons of Thunder". Adrien Bergrand of PopMatters praised the album for being more listener-friendly akin to Neurosis's The Eye of Every Storm (also produced by Albini) while noting influence from Motörhead, Slayer, and Entombed. Sam Ubl has stated that Blessed Black Wings and its sharper and more agile sound will appeal to fans of Mastodon's Leviathan.

=== Accolades ===
| Year | Publication | Country | Accolade | Rank |
|---|---|---|---|---|
| 2011 | Terrorizer | United States | "The Top 21 Relapse Records" | 18 |
| 2012 | Stereogum | United States | "The Top 20 Steve Albini-Produced Albums" | 18 |
| 2016 | Loudwire | United States | "The 100 Best Hard Rock + Metal Albums of the 21st Century" | 73 |
| 2016 | Metal Hammer | United Kingdom | "The 10 Essential Sludge Metal Albums" | * |
| 2016 | Treblezine | United States | "10 Essential Sludge Metal Albums" | * |
| 2017 | Rolling Stone | United States | "The 100 Greatest Metal Albums of All Time" | 84 |
"*" denotes an unordered list.

== Track listing ==
| No. | Title | Length |
|---|---|---|
| 1. | "Devilution" | 4:46 |
| 2. | "The Face of Oblivion" | 6:36 |
| 3. | "Brother in the Wind" | 5:40 |
| 4. | "Cometh Down Hessian" | 5:14 |
| 5. | "Blessed Black Wings" | 7:43 |
| 6. | "Anointing of Seer" | 5:39 |
| 7. | "To Cross the Bridge" | 7:20 |
| 8. | "Silver Back" | 3:14 |
| 9. | "Sons of Thunder" | 7:12 |

Vinyl bonus track
| No. | Title | Length |
|---|---|---|
| 10. | "Rapid Fire" (Judas Priest cover) | 4:18 |

== Personnel ==
- Matt Pike – guitar, vocals
- Des Kensel – drums
- Joe Preston – bass
- Greg Norman – AMP repair
- Produced by Steve Albini and High on Fire
- Engineered by Steve Albini
- Assistant engineers – Russ Arbuthnot, Rob Vester
- Mastered by John Golden
- Visuals by Arik Roper
