= 3,14... (band) =

Azerbaijani death-doom metal band

- Origin: Baku, Azerbaijan
- Genres: Death/doom metal
- Years active: 2002–present
- Members: Max Kochetov; Emin Kerimov; Yagub Kuliyev; Tair Mamedov; Kenan Habibov
- Website: 314.az

3,14... is a death/doom metal band from Baku, Azerbaijan, formed in 2002.

== Biography ==
The band was formed in September 2002 by Max Kochetov and Emin Kerimov after the breakup of the band “Dissonance”. Later, vocalist Seva Aliyeva and drummer Vadim Alekperov joined the band. They first played on stage in 2003 in the “Black Jack” club under the name “Alma Mater”.

In December 2006, they changed the cast and the name of the band to “3,14...”. They appeared on BakPort stage.

In March 2007, they recorded their first demo album, “This is Just the Beginning”, which consisted of 8 songs (including 2 covers). Later they performed live on local TV channel ITV. In summer 2007, the band began to work on new music ideas. “Izbavlenie” (“Deliverance”) had become the first song recorded in studio. Later on, its music video was also recorded. In the beginning of 2008, “3,14...” created the metal movement “Dark Line”. A lot of concerts with participation of various young metal bands were arranged under the aegis of this movement.

In February 2009 the band began to work on their first studio album, “Neizbejnost” (“Inevitability”). The album consisted of 9 songs and “Izbavlenie” as a bonus track. The presentation of the album was made on 3 October 2009 at band's solo concert. In September 2009, the band gave an interview to German magazine “Metal Hammer”. In December 2009, Italian radio station “Yasta Radio” performed a programme about bands “3,14...”, “Novembre” and “Ulver”. “Yasta Radio” broadcast songs from “3,14...”’s album “Neizbejnost” for a few weeks. In 2010, “3,14...” released a project named “VPERED/OBRATNO” (“AHEAD/BACKWARDS”) with other musicians. They presented the project on the band's solo concert on 27 November 2010.

In February 2011 the band released the new single "Sposi i Sxoroni" from their upcoming album "Poxorony Lucshego Druga", released in April 2011.

After a few months, keyboarder Emin Hasanov decided to leave the band to rest and work on his side-project Silver September, which is an atmospheric/progressive rock band.

In January 2014, the band released their new single, called "Ispoved". This is a new single from upcoming album "Khroniki Smertnika" with new keyboarder Kanan Habibov.

== Members ==
- Max Kochetov - Bass, Vocals (2002–present)
- Emin Kerimov - Vocals, Guitars (2002–present)
- Yagub Kuliev - Drums (2012–present)
- Tair Mamedov - Guitars (2012–present)
- Kenan Habibov - Keyboards (2012–present)

Past members

- Emin Hasanov - Keyboards (2007–2012)
- Vadim Alekberov - Drums (2002–2003)
- Seva Aliyeva - Vocals (2002–2003)
- Ramin Sadıqov - Drums (2006–2007)
- Elshan Aliyev - Guitars (2006–2007)
- Timur Huseynov - Guitars (2006–2007)
- Nurana Aliyeva - Vocals (2006–2007)
- Sabir Najafli - Drums (2010–2011)
- Ilyas Ahmed-zade - Drums (2011–2012)

== Discography ==
Studio albums

- Это только начало / Eto Tolko Nachalo (This Is Just The Beginning) (2007, demo)
- Неизбежность / Neizbejnost (Inevitability) (2009)
- Вперёд/Обратно / Vpered/Obratno (Forward/Backward) (2010)
- Похороны лучшего друга / Pokhorony Luchshego Druga (Best Friend's Funeral) (2011)
- Хроники Смертника / Khroniki Smertnika (Death Chronicles) (2014)

Singles

- Неизбежность (2009)
- Про Малиновую Девочку (2010)
- Спаси и Схорони (2011)
- Исповедь (2014)
