= Death Is This Communion =

Studio album by High on Fire
- Released: September 10, 2007 (Europe); September 18, 2007 (US)
- Recorded: 2007
- Genre: Stoner metal, sludge metal
- Length: 56:48
- Label: Relapse Records
- Producer: Jack Endino

High on Fire chronology
Blessed Black Wings (2005)	Death Is This Communion (2007)	Snakes for the Divine (2010)

Professional ratings
Aggregate scores
Source	Rating
Metacritic	80/100
Review scores
Source	Rating
AllMusic	4/5 stars
Pitchfork Media	(8.2/10)
Scene Point Blank	(7.7/10)

Death Is This Communion (stylized as Death•Is•This•Communion•) is the fourth studio album by American heavy metal band High on Fire. It was released on September 10, 2007, in Europe and September 18 in the United States. The first pressing includes a bonus DVD featuring in-studio footage of the making of the album. It is the first album to feature Jeff Matz on bass guitar. Frontman Matt Pike noted that the album's lyrics were influenced by David Icke, H. P. Lovecraft, and the Bible.

The album has received generally good reviews, with an average rating of 80 on Metacritic. It was named the third-best album of the year by Revolver. Total Guitar named it fourth in their "50 Best Guitar Albums of the Year". It came in at number 9 in Metal Hammer's best of 2007 list.

== Track listing ==
All tracks written by High on Fire.

No.	Title	Length
1.	"Fury Whip"	6:14
2.	"Waste of Tiamat"	5:44
3.	"Death Is This Communion"	8:34
4.	"Khanrad's Wall" (instrumental)	2:27
5.	"Turk"	5:03
6.	"Headhunter" (instrumental)	1:24
7.	"Rumors of War"	2:51
8.	"DII" (instrumental)	3:45
9.	"Cyclopian Scape"	7:30
10.	"Ethereal"	6:56
11.	"Return to NOD"	6:18

== Credits ==
- Matt Pike – guitar, vocals
- Jeff Matz – bass
- Des Kensel – drums
- Jack Endino – production, engineering and mixing
- Alan Douches – mastering
- Arik Roper – album cover
