= High on Fire =

American metal band

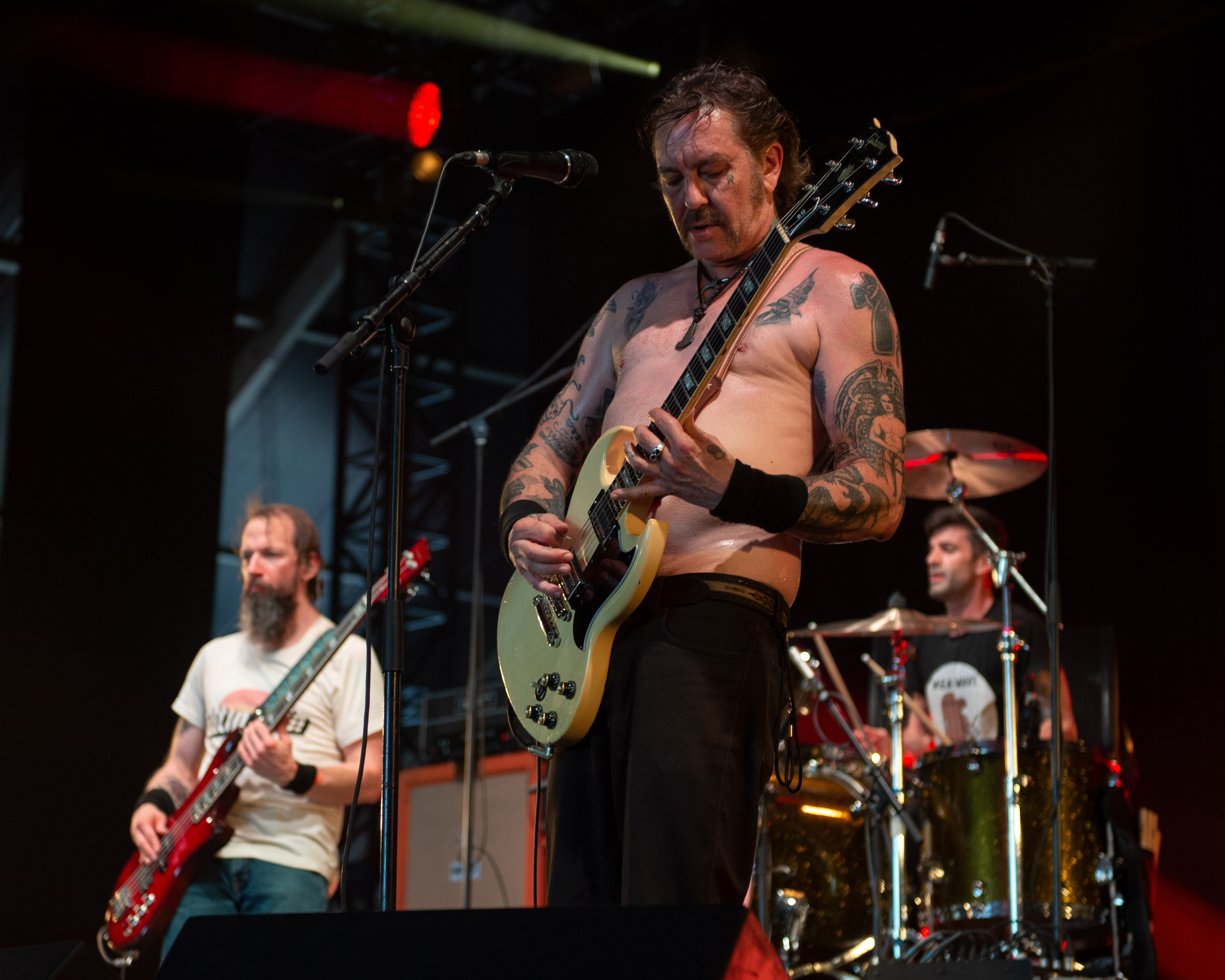
- High on Fire at Hellfest 2022

Background information
- Origin: Oakland, California, U.S.
- Genres: Stoner metal; sludge metal; thrash metal
- Works: High on Fire discography
- Years active: 1998–present
- Labels: Relapse, Man's Ruin, Koch
- Members: Matt Pike; Jeff Matz; Ben Koller
- Past members: Des Kensel; Karl Larson; Ron; George Rice; Joe Preston; Coady Willis
- Website: High on Fire on X

High on Fire is an American heavy metal band from Oakland, California, that was formed in 1998. Matt Pike, the band's frontman and founder, also played guitar for Sleep. High on Fire won the 2019 Grammy Award for Best Metal Performance with their song "Electric Messiah". The band has released nine studio albums, with their newest, Cometh the Storm, released in 2024.

== History ==
High on Fire was founded in 1998 as a four-piece by Sleep guitarist Matt Pike, with drummer Des Kensel, guitarist Karl Larson, and bassist Ron. George Rice, who had previously played in Dear Deceased, later joined as the band's vocalist. Due to creative disagreements drummer Des Kensel later left the band. Soon after, Matt Pike invited Des Kensel to reform the band, with their original vocalist George Rice switched to bass while Pike became the lead singer.

In 1999, High on Fire recorded a three-song EP, which was released on 12th Records. The three songs were re-recorded and included on the band's first full-length album, The Art of Self Defense, which was released by Man's Ruin Records on March 7, 2000. Tee Pee Records re-released The Art of Self Defense with two new bonus tracks the following year, as Man's Ruin Records had become defunct.

In 2001, High on Fire signed a record deal with Relapse Records and recorded the album Surrounded by Thieves, which was released on May 28, 2002. On January 19, 2003, the band performed at the Relapse Records Contamination Festival. After the tours promoting Surrounded by Thieves, bassist George Rice left the band and was replaced by ex-Melvins/Thrones bassist Joe Preston.

The band's next album, 2005's Blessed Black Wings, was largely written by Pike and Kensel before the recording sessions. The album was produced by Steve Albini, and was released on February 1, 2005. A music video was produced for the song "Devilution." While touring with Goatwhore and Watch Them Die to promote Blessed Black Wings, Joe Preston left the band for undisclosed reasons, and was temporarily replaced by Jeff Matz of Zeke. Matz finished the tour with High on Fire and became a full-time member during the recording of Death Is This Communion. Death Is This Communion was released on September 18, 2007 (September 10, in Europe).

After Death Is This Communion was released, High on Fire played a small string of Northwest shows to promote it. The band did a headline tour of North America in September and October 2007, with support from the Japanese post-rock band Mono, along with Panthers and Coliseum. High on Fire also played on 2008's Gigantour, which was followed by a North American tour with the bands Opeth, Baroness, and Nachtmystium.

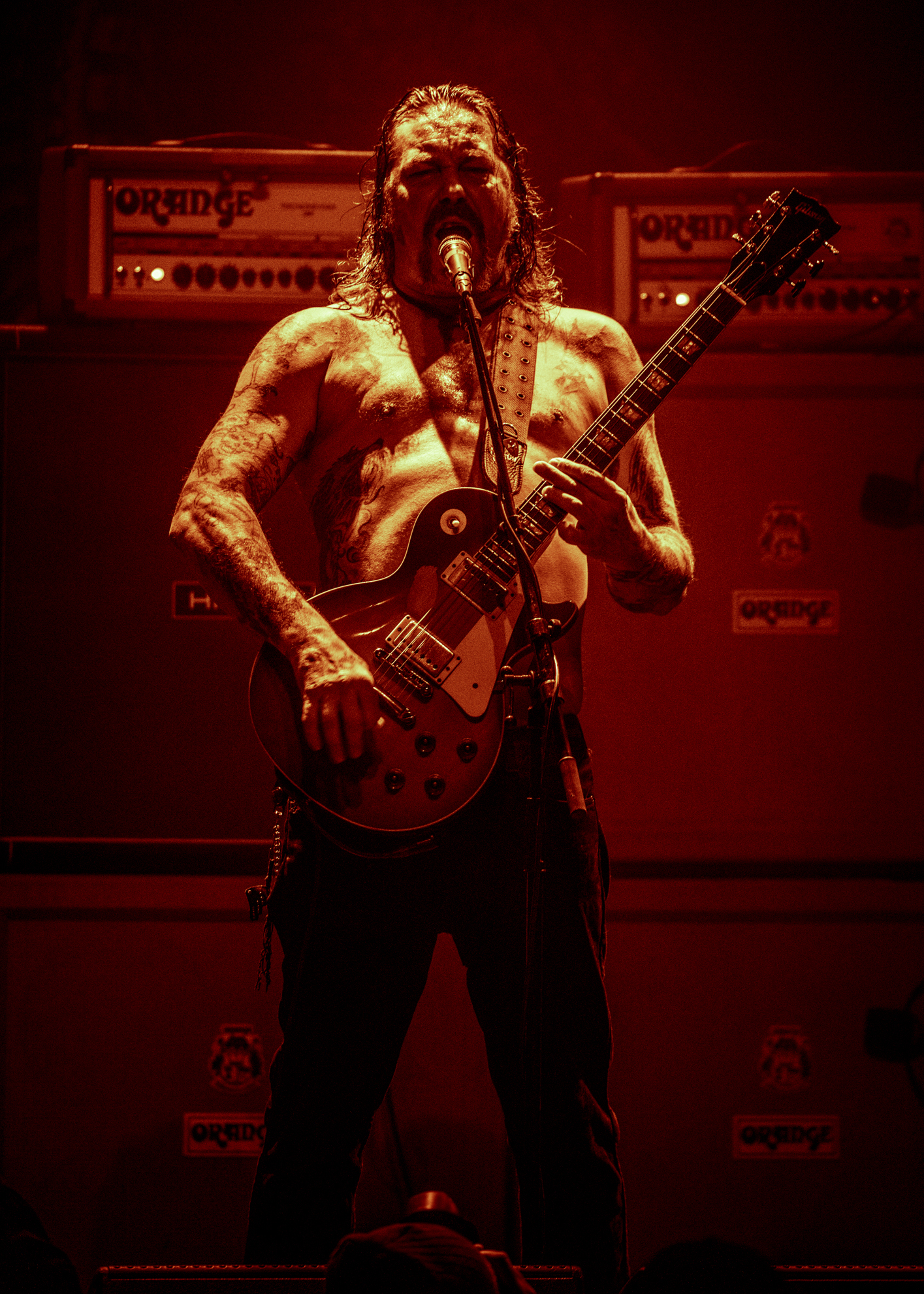
Frontman Matt Pike performing in 2016

On December 17, 2008, High on Fire signed a recording deal with Koch Records. On August 1, 2009, it was announced a new album would be recorded with producer Greg Fidelman. Later that month, following the news of the new album, High on Fire announced a tour with Mastodon, Dethklok, and Converge. The tour spanned from October 2 to November 21.

In August 2009, the band went into post-production of the follow-up to Death Is This Communion at The Pass Studios in Los Angeles. The album artwork for the new album was released on January 7, 2010. On January 15, following the release of the album artwork, the song Frost Hammer was posted on the band's Myspace page, and a video for the song was released on March 16, 2010. High on Fire's fifth album Snakes for the Divine was formally released on February 23, 2010.

In March 2010, the band announced a headlining U.S. tour to promote the album; supporting bands for the tour include Priestess, Black Cobra, and Bison B.C. On April 6, 2010, the band announced they would be opening for Metallica for eight European shows.

In 2010, the band was confirmed as being part of the soundtrack for Namco Bandai Games' 2010 remake of Splatterhouse. On April 3, 2012, High on Fire released their sixth studio album, De Vermis Mysteriis. Metalsucks.net reviews editor Sammy O'Hagar argued that the band has "rebounded in epic fashion" since their last album, and that "Even for a band as esteemed as High on Fire, [De Vermis Mysteriis] is a career high point."

High on Fire was scheduled to play the 2012 Mayhem Festival but dropped off the tour due to Matt Pike's health. Pike returned to the band and they once again began touring in November 2012.

High on Fire's album Luminiferous became available in full for free streaming as a preview with NPR music on June 7, 2015, with the official release of the album nine days later on June 16. Luminiferous is the second High on Fire album in a row produced by Converge guitarist Kurt Ballou. NPR reviewer Adrien Begrand credits Kurt Ballou with "helping rejuvenate the band's sound" on their previous album, and praises the album as evidence of High on Fire's consistency, fueled by the "right combination of adherence to formula and subtle experimentation." Dan Epstein, writing for Rolling Stone, concurs that "one could definitely make the case that [Luminiferous] is High on Fire's finest album yet."

At the 61st Grammy Awards held in February 2019, High on Fire won a Grammy for "Best Metal Performance" for their song "Electric Messiah".

Drummer and co-founder Des Kensel announced his departure from the band on July 26, 2019, and he was temporarily replaced by Chris Maggio. Big Business and ex-Melvins drummer Coady Willis ultimately became High on Fire's new drummer in June 2021. With the new lineup, the band recorded a cover of the Motörhead song "Iron Fist", which was released in 2022 on the tribute album Löve Me Förever: A Tribute to Motörhead.

On February 16, 2024, High on Fire announced their ninth studio album, Cometh the Storm. It was released on April 19, and the single "Burning Down" was released along with the album's announcement, along with the album's title track being released as a single later.

In October 2024, Ben Koller joined the band as a live drummer for their European and UK tour, due to prior commitments of the primary drummer, Coady Willis.

== Members ==
=== Current members ===
- Matt Pike – guitars (1998–present), vocals (1998–present)
- Jeff Matz – bass (2006–present)
- Ben Koller – drums (2025–present)

=== Former members ===
- Des Kensel – drums (1998, 1998–2019)
- Karl Larson – guitars (1998)
- Ron – bass (1998)
- George Rice – vocals (1998), bass (1998–2004)
- Joe Preston – bass (2004–2006)
- Coady Willis – drums (2021–2025)

=== Former touring members ===
- Nick Parks – drums (2019, 2019)
- Chris Maggio – drums (2019–2021)

== Discography ==
- The Art of Self Defense (2000)
- Surrounded by Thieves (2002)
- Blessed Black Wings (2005)
- Death Is This Communion (2007)
- Snakes for the Divine (2010)
- De Vermis Mysteriis (2012)
- Luminiferous (2015)
- Electric Messiah (2018)
- Cometh the Storm (2024)
