= Luminiferous =

Studio album by High on Fire
- Released: June 23, 2015
- Studios: Godcity Recording Studio, Salem, Massachusetts
- Genres: Stoner metal; sludge metal; thrash metal
- Length: 53:45
- Label: eOne
- Producer: Kurt Ballou

High on Fire chronology
De Vermis Mysteriis (2012)	Luminiferous (2015)	Electric Messiah (2018)

Singles from Luminiferous
- 1. "Slave the Hive" Released: October 15, 2013; 2. "The Black Plot" Released: May 12, 2015

Luminiferous is the seventh studio album by American heavy metal band High on Fire, released on June 23, 2015, through Entertainment One Music. The album was produced by Kurt Ballou who handled production on the band's previous release, De Vermis Mysteriis (2012).

== Reception ==
Professional ratings
Aggregate scores
Source	Rating
Metacritic	82/100
Review scores
Source	Rating
AllMusic	4/5 stars
The Austin Chronicle	4/5 stars
The A.V. Club	A−
Exclaim!	9/10
Now	3/5 stars
Pitchfork	8/10
PopMatters	7/10 stars

Luminiferous was met with critical acclaim. The album received an average score of 82/100 from 13 reviews on Metacritic, indicating "universal acclaim". Thom Jurek of AllMusic praised the album, writing, "One reason that High on Fire don't get accused of resting on their laurels is that they always come out hungry, anxious to refine their sound and remove anything that is not absolutely essential to their purposes. Luminiferous accomplishes that as well." Writing for Pitchfork, Grayson Haver Currin called the album "masterful" and said, "Featuring mammoth riffs and hooks, it feels like a classic compendium of High on Fire's successes." Denise Falzon of Exclaim! wrote, "Heavy metal at its finest, Luminiferous is a brilliant, dynamic release, showcasing High on Fire's penchant for diverse, thoughtful songwriting and impeccable musicianship." In his review of the album, Richard Giraldi of PopMatters considered Luminiferous nothing new, but still extremely refined and "some of the finest metal on the planet". In a more lukewarm review, Now's John Semley considered the album a passable distraction while Pike's other band, Sleep worked on their reformation.

After its release, Luminiferous appeared on several year-end lists.

=== Accolades ===
Year	Publication	Country	Accolade	Rank
2015	Decibel	United States	"Top 40 Albums of 2015"	4
2015	Pitchfork	United States	"The Best Metal Albums of 2015"	18
2015	PopMatters	United States	"The Best Metal of 2015"	9
2015	Revolver	United States	"20 Best Albums of 2015"	8

== Track listing ==
All tracks are written by High on Fire.

No.	Title	Length
1.	"The Black Plot"	5:31
2.	"Carcosa"	7:11
3.	"The Sunless Years"	5:06
4.	"Slave the Hive"	3:50
5.	"The Falconist"	6:06
6.	"Dark Side of the Compass"	5:30
7.	"The Cave"	7:40
8.	"Luminiferous"	4:03
9.	"The Lethal Chamber"	8:49
Total length:		53:45

== Personnel ==
Credits adapted from liner notes.

High on Fire

- Matt Pike – lead vocals, guitar
- Jeff Matz – bass, backing vocals, bağlama (7)
- Des Kensel – drums, backing vocals

Guest musicians

- Kurt Ballou – backing vocals (4)
- Robert Cheeseman – backing vocals (4)
- Jason Zucco – backing vocals (4)
- Scott Evans – backing vocals (4)

Technical personnel

- Kurt Ballou – production, recording, mixing
- Robert Cheeseman – engineering assistance
- Jordan Barlow – illustrations
- Paul Grosso – creative direction
- Andrew Kelley – art direction, design
