= Lethian Dreams =

French metal band

- Origin: France
- Genres: Doom metal
- Years active: 2002–present
- Labels: Orcynia Records
- Members: Matthieu Sachs; Carline Van Roos; Pierre Bourguignon
- Past members: Carlos D'Agua
- Website: lethiandreams.com

Lethian Dreams is a French doom metal band, founded in 2002 by Carline Van Roos and Matthieu Sachs, also known for their work in the bands Aythis and Remembrance. Starting as an atmospheric doom metal band, Lethian Dreams evolved later to a more ethereal sound, adding elements from different musical styles. The band self-describes its music as "ethereal doom metal" but elements from black metal, shoegaze or post-metal can also be found in their music.

== History ==
After releasing 3 demos from 2002 to 2006, the band released its first album Bleak Silver Streams in 2009. This first work summed up the result of the 5 first years of existence of the band by featuring most of the songs from the demos. The music blends atmospheric keyboards, heavy guitars with ethereal voices and death vocals. A style clearly enrooted in atmospheric doom metal and often compared to bands such as Anathema or the 3rd and the Mortal. The first album is also the only album (except from the demos) to feature death growls, which are performed by Carlos D'Agua (Before the Rain). In 2012, the band released its second album, this time with brand new songs, in a style different from the previous one : the band focuses on the ethereal side of their music and uses rawer guitar riffing. In October 2013, the band announced the recording of their 3rd album. The album, Red Silence Lodge was released in 2014.

== Current members ==
- Matthieu Sachs – guitars, keyboards (2002–present)
- Carline Van Roos – guitars, keyboards, drums, bass, vocals (2002–present)
- Pierre Bourguignon – drums (2013–present)

=== Past members ===
- Carlos D'Agua – harsh vocals (2006–2009)

== Discography ==
=== Studio albums ===
- Bleak Silver Streams (2009)
- Season of Raven Words (2012)
- Red Silence Lodge (2014)
- A Shadow of Memories (2020)

=== EPs ===
- Just Passing By and Unreleased Requiems (2011)
- Last Echoes of Silence (2021)

=== Demos ===
- Mournful Whispers (2003)
- Lost in Grief (2004)
- Requiem for My Soul, Eternal Rest for My Heart (2006)
