= The Art of Self Defense (album) =

Studio album by High on Fire
- Released: March 7, 2000
- Genre: Stoner metal, sludge metal
- Length: 43:18; 51:37 (with bonus tracks)
- Label: Man's Ruin, Tee Pee
- Producer: Billy Anderson & High on Fire

High on Fire chronology
The Art of Self Defense (2000)	Surrounded by Thieves (2002)

Alternative cover
- Bonus track version

Professional ratings
Review scores
Source	Rating
AllMusic	4/5 stars
Kerrang!	4/5 stars
Pulse Magazine	4/5 stars

The Art of Self Defense is the debut studio album by American heavy metal band High on Fire. It was released originally by Man's Ruin Records in 2000.

== Track listing ==
All songs composed by High on Fire unless stated.

No.	Title	Length
1.	"Baghdad"	5:15
2.	"10,000 Years"	7:53
3.	"Blood from Zion" (High on Fire, Karl Larson)	4:55
4.	"Last"	6:36
5.	"Fireface"	8:35
6.	"Master of Fists"	10:03

=== Bonus tracks ===
In 2001, Tee Pee Records re-released the album with different album art and two bonus tracks. One of them being a cover of "The Usurper" by Celtic Frost.

No.	Title	Length
7.	"Steel Shoe"	4:31
8.	"The Usurper" (Celtic Frost cover)	3:48

In 2012, Southern Lord Records re-released the album with slightly different cover art than the Man's Ruin Records version and three additional bonus tracks (all from High on Fire's self-titled 1999 demo).

No.	Title	Length
9.	"Blood from Zion" (Demo)	5:02
10.	"10,000 Years" (Demo)	7:43
11.	"Master of Fists" (Demo)	10:31

== Personnel ==
- Matt Pike – guitar, vocals
- Des Kensel – drums
- George Rice – bass
- Produced by Billy Anderson and High on Fire
