= Joyce Appleby =

American historian

- Born: Joyce Oldham; April 9, 1929; Omaha, Nebraska
- Died: December 23, 2016 (aged 87); Taos, New Mexico
- Board member of: Organization of American Historians (1991); American Historical Association (1997)
- Spouse: Andrew Bell Appleby

Academic background
- Education: Stanford University (BA); University of California, Santa Barbara (MA) Claremont Graduate University (PhD)

Academic work
- Discipline: Historian
- Institutions: UCLA

Joyce Oldham Appleby (April 9, 1929 – December 23, 2016) was an American historian. She was a professor of history at UCLA. She was president of the Organization of American Historians (1991) and the American Historical Association (1997).

== Life ==
Appleby was born in Omaha, Nebraska. Her father was a businessman and she attended public schools in Omaha, Dallas, Kansas City, Evanston, Phoenix and Pasadena.

Appleby received her B.A. degree in history from Stanford University in 1950 and became a magazine writer in New York. Returning to academia, she earned her M.A. from the University of California, Santa Barbara and her Ph.D. in history from Claremont Graduate School in 1966.

Appleby was the widow of Andrew Bell Appleby, a professor of European history at San Diego State University. Her first marriage to Mark Lansburgh ended in divorce. She had three children: Ann Lansburgh Caylor, Mark Lansburgh and Frank Bell Appleby.

Appleby died on December 23, 2016, at the age of 87.

== Career ==
Appleby taught at San Diego State University from 1967 to 1981, then became a professor of history at the University of California, Los Angeles. She was elected a fellow of the American Academy of Arts and Sciences in 1993, and a member of the American Philosophical Society in 1994. In 1990–1991, she was the Harold Vyvyan Harmsworth Professor of American History at Oxford University.

As the president of the Organization of American Historians, Appleby secured congressional support for an endowment to send American studies libraries to 60 universities around the world. A selection of 1,000 books was made by a group of scholars on American history, literature, political science, sociology and philosophy.

Appleby was a specialist in historiography and the political thought of the early American Republic, with special interests in Republicanism, liberalism and the history of ideas about capitalism. She served on the editorial boards of numerous scholarly journals and editorial projects, and received prominent national fellowships.

== Works ==
=== Articles ===
- "Reconciliation and the Northern Novelist, 1865–1880", Civil War History, Vol. 10 (June 1964)
- "The Jefferson-Adams Rupture and the First French Translation of John Adams' Defence", American Historical Review, Vol. 73, No. 4 (April 1968)
- "The New Republican Synthesis and the Changing Political Ideas of John Adams", American Quarterly, Vol. 25, No. 5 (December 1973)
- "Liberalism and the American Revolution", New England Quarterly, Vol. 49, No. 1 (March 1976)
- "The Social Origins of American Revolutionary Ideology", Journal of American History, Vol. 64, No. 4 (March 1978)
- "Modernization Theory and the Formation of Modern Social Theories in England and America", Comparative Studies in Society and History, Vol. 20, No. 2 (April 1978)
- "Commercial Farming and the 'Agrarian Myth' in the Early Republic", Journal of American History, Vol. 68, No. 4 (March 1982)
- "What Is Still American in the Political Philosophy of Thomas Jefferson?", William and Mary Quarterly, Vol. 39, No. 2 (April 1982)
- "History as Art: Another View", American Quarterly, Vol. 34, No. 1 (Spring 1982)
- "Republicanism and Ideology", American Quarterly, Vol. 37, No. 4 (Autumn 1985)
- "Republicanism in Old and New Contexts", William and Mary Quarterly, Vol. 43, No. 1 (January 1986)
- "The American Heritage: The Heirs and the Disinherited", Journal of American History, Vol. 74, No. 3 (December 1987)
- "One Good Turn Deserves Another: Moving beyond the Linguistic; A Response to David Harlan", American Historical Review, Vol. 94, No. 5 (December 1989)
- "Recovering America's Historic Diversity: Beyond Exceptionalism", Journal of American History, Vol. 79, No. 2 (September 1992)
- "The Personal Roots of the First American Temperance Movement", Proceedings of the American Philosophical Society, Vol. 141, No. 2 (June 1997)
- "The Power of History", American Historical Review, Vol. 103, No.1 (February 1998)
- "The Americans' Higher-Law Thinking behind Higher Lawmaking", Yale Law Journal, Vol. 108, No. 8 (June 1999)

=== Books ===
External videos
- Booknotes interview with Appleby on Inheriting the Revolution, June 18, 2000, C-SPAN
- Q&A interview with Appleby on The Relentless Revolution, May 16, 2010, C-SPAN
- Interview with Appleby on Shores of Knowledge, May 6, 2014, C-SPAN

- Economic Thought and Ideology in Seventeenth Century England (Princeton, New Jersey: Princeton University Press, 1978) ISBN 978-0-691-05265-6
- Capitalism and a New Social Order: The Republican Vision of the 1790s (New York: New York University Press, 1984) ISBN 978-0-8147-0581-0
- Liberalism and Republicanism in the Historical Imagination (Cambridge, Massachusetts: Harvard University Press, 1992) ISBN 978-0-674-53012-6
- (co-author) Telling the Truth About History (New York, New York: W. W. Norton & Company, 1994) ISBN 978-0-393-31286-7
- (ed.) Knowledge and Postmodernism in Historical Perspective (New York: Routledge, 1996) ISBN 978-0-415-91382-9
- (ed.) Recollections of the Early Republic: Selected Autobiographies (Boston: Northeastern University Press, 1997) ISBN 978-1-55553-301-4
- Inheriting the Revolution : The First Generation of Americans (Cambridge, Massachusetts: Belknap Press, 2000) ISBN 978-0-674-00236-4
- (ed.) Thomas Paine, Common Sense and Other Writings (New York: Barnes & Noble Classics, 2005) ISBN 978-1-59308-209-3
- The Relentless Revolution: A History of Capitalism (New York: W. W. Norton & Company, 2010) ISBN 978-0-393-06894-8
- Shores of Knowledge: New World Discoveries and the Scientific Imagination (New York: W. W. Norton & Company, 2013) ISBN 978-0-393-23951-5

== See also ==
- List of Stanford University people
- List of University of California, Los Angeles people
