= Surrounded by Thieves =

Studio album by High on Fire
- Released: May 28, 2002
- Genre: Stoner metal, sludge metal
- Length: 40:38
- Label: Relapse Records
- Producer: Billy Anderson & High on Fire

High on Fire chronology
The Art of Self Defense (2000)	Surrounded by Thieves (2002)	Blessed Black Wings (2005)

Surrounded by Thieves is the second studio album by American heavy metal band High on Fire. It was the band's first album for Relapse Records and was produced by Billy Anderson and the band itself. "Hung, Drawn and Quartered" was utilized as the album's promotional track. It was featured on a 7" split with Mastodon's "March of the Fire Ants" and had a music video which aired on Uranium and MTV's Headbangers Ball. It would be the last album with founding bassist George Rice.

== Reception ==
Professional ratings
Review scores
Source	Rating
AllMusic	4.5/5 stars
Pitchfork	(8.8/10)

Surrounded by Thieves was well received by critics. AllMusic's Brian O'Neill awarded the album 4.5 out of 5 stars, calling it "relentless" and suggesting that every song was "an epic that rolls like sinister thunder across the landscape." O'Neill noted that there was "not much variation" on the album but added that variety isn't necessary "when you get locked into a groove this good."

Isaiah Violante, writing for Pitchfork, gave a similarly positive review of 8.8 out of 10. He praised the album's "nihilistic theme and all-encompassing walls of drone". He went on to praise the band for being able to "only operate according to its own whims" while also making "organic and monstrous music".

== Track listing ==
No.	Title	Length
1.	"Eyes & Teeth"	5:03
2.	"Hung, Drawn and Quartered"	4:27
3.	"Speedwolf"	4:36
4.	"The Yeti"	7:07
5.	"Nemesis"	3:34
6.	"Thraft of Caanan"	8:06
7.	"Surrounded by Thieves"	4:19
8.	"Razor Hoof"	3:26

== Personnel ==
- Matt Pike – guitar, vocals
- George Rice – bass
- Des Kensel – drums

=== Production ===
- Billy Anderson – producer, engineer
- Mark Keaton – mastering
- Orion Landau – artwork
- Justin Lieberman – assistant engineer
