= Snakes for the Divine =

Studio album by High on Fire
- Released: February 23, 2010
- Studio: The Pass Studios (Los Angeles)
- Genre: Stoner metal, sludge metal, thrash metal
- Length: 45:55
- Label: E1 Music
- Producer: Greg Fidelman

High on Fire chronology
Death Is This Communion (2007)	Snakes for the Divine (2010)	De Vermis Mysteriis (2012)

Snakes for the Divine is the fifth studio album by American heavy metal band High on Fire.

== History and recording ==
Snakes for the Divine was recorded at The Pass Studios in Los Angeles with producer Greg Fidelman. The album cover art and track listing were revealed on the band's Myspace page on January 6, 2010. The album was released on February 23 through E1 Music.

== Theme ==
In an interview, frontman Matt Pike stated: "The title 'Snakes for the Divine' is based on the premise that Adam and Eve weren't the first people on Earth, and Adam having a wife that was a Reptilian named Lilith. They were the first two people to take the reptilian DNA, and make shape-shifting human beings that go between the fourth-dimensional, the Anunnaki, and human beings. Eventually, from ancient Mesopotamia, this spawned a thing called the Illuminati - the enlightened ones - coming up through the centuries, and choosing the kings, controlling your media, controlling your banking, blah blah blah. It's just theory at most points. I thought it'd make a great metal song, so I just went ahead and started writing about that. That's how the record came about, as far as the theme.."

== Reception ==
Professional ratings
Aggregate scores
Source	Rating
Metacritic	80/100
Review scores
Source	Rating
About.com	3.5/5 stars
AllMusic	4.5/5 stars
Blabbermouth.net	8/10 stars
Drowned in Sound	7/10 stars
Jukebox:Metal	4/5 stars
Pitchfork Media	8.0/10 stars
PopMatters	8/10 stars
Rock Sound	10/10 stars

Exclaim! named Snakes for the Divine the ninth-best metal album of 2010.

== Track listing ==
All tracks are written by High on Fire.

No.	Title	Length
1.	"Snakes for the Divine"	8:23
2.	"Frost Hammer"	6:07
3.	"Bastard Samurai"	6:37
4.	"Ghost Neck"	5:01
5.	"The Path" (instrumental)	1:20
6.	"Fire, Flood & Plague"	6:08
7.	"How Dark We Pray"	8:06
8.	"Holy Flames of the Fire Spitter"	4:13
9.	"Mystery of Helm" (bonus track)	4:01
10.	"Eyes & Teeth (Live)" (Best Buy bonus track)	4:31
11.	"Cometh Down Hessian (Live)" (Best Buy bonus track)	4:33

== Personnel ==
- Matt Pike – guitars, vocals
- Jeff Matz – bass
- Des Kensel – drums
- Greg Fidelman – production
- Arik Roper – album cover
