= Forgive Us Our Trespasses (album) =

Studio album by A Storm of Light
- Released: 22 September 2009
- Recorded: 2009
- Studio: Strangeweather Studio Brooklyn and Studio G Brooklyn
- Genre: Post-metal
- Length: 58:12
- Label: Neurot
- Producer: Joel Hamilton and Josh Graham

A Storm of Light chronology
And We Wept the Black Ocean Within (2007)	Forgive Us Our Trespasses (2009)	As the Valley of Death Becomes Us, Our Silver Memories Fade (2011)

Professional ratings
Review scores
Source	Rating
allmusic	3/5 stars
Rock Sound	8/10 stars

Forgive Us Our Trespasses is the second studio album by the American post-metal band A Storm of Light. The song "Tempest" was made into a music video, directed by the guitarist/vocalist Josh Graham. The lyrics and album artwork depict environmental and post-apocalyptic themes, including references to the 'Sixth Extinction' alluded to in the Red Sparowes album At the Soundless Dawn, an album also featuring Graham.

== Track listing ==
No.	Title	Length
1.	"Alpha (Law of Nature Pt 1)"	2:20
2.	"Amber Waves of Gray"	7:48
3.	"Tempest"	5:00
4.	"The Light in Their Eyes"	5:50
5.	"Trouble Is Near"	6:13
6.	"Arc of Failure (Law of Nature Pt 2)"	2:51
7.	"Midnight"	8:56
8.	"Across the Wilderness"	6:16
9.	"Time Our Savior (Law of Nature Pt 3)"	1:28
10.	"Omega"	11:37

== Personnel ==
=== A Storm of Light ===
- Josh Graham – guitar, vocals, synthesizers, banjo, piano
- Domenic Seita – bass guitar, backing vocals, percussion
- Andy Rice – drums, percussion
- Joel Hamilton – guitar, modular synthesizer, wurlitzer, percussion

=== Session musicians ===
- Nerissa Campbell – guest vocals on tracks 2, 6, and 7
- Jarboe – guest vocals on tracks 4 and 8
- Lydia Lunch – spoken word on tracks 1, 6, and 9
- Carla Kihlstedt – guest vocals and violin on tracks 1 and 6
- Marika Hughes – cello on tracks 1, 4, and 10
- Aaron Lazar – backing vocals on track 7
- Marc Allen Goodman – backing vocals on track 7
