= Nachtmystium (EP) =

Studio album by Nachtmystium
- Released: 2003
- Recorded: 2002
- Studio: Bride of Insect Studios, Hellgod Studios
- Genre: Black metal
- Length: 24:00
- Label: Regimental Records; Painiac Records; Battle Kommand Records; Desire of Goat Productions

Nachtmystium chronology
Reign of the Malicious (2002)	Nachtmystium (2003)	Demise (2004)

Nachtmystium is an EP by Nachtmystium.

Regimental Records: CD limited to 1000 copies.
Painiac Records: vinyl version limited to hand-numbered 400 copies.
Battle Kommand Records re-release done in November 2005, with new artwork.
Reissued with 'Reign of the Malicious' on CD by Desire of Goat Productions in 2005, limited to 500 copies.

== Track listing ==
1. The Glorious Moment - 05:12
2. Cold Tormentor (I've Become) - 02:44
3. Come Forth, Devastation - 03:22
4. Embrace Red Horizon - 02:31
5. Call of the Ancient - 04:24
6. Gaze Upon Heaven in Flames (Judas Iscariot cover) - 05:47

== Production ==
- Recorded in August 2002 at Bride of Insect Studios, Chicago, IL, except 'Gaze Upon Heaven in Flames' which was recorded at Hellgod Studios mid-2002
- Engineered by D.o.A.

== Personnel ==
- Azentrius: Guitars, bass and vocals
- Zmij: Vocals
- Aamonael: Guitars
- Session member: Drums

=== Additional personnel ===
- Christophe Szpajdel — logo
