= Silencing Machine =

Studio album by Nachtmystium
- Released: July 30, 2012
- Recorded: 2012
- Studio: Engine Studios, Chicago
- Genre: Black metal
- Length: 59:38
- Label: Century Media

Nachtmystium chronology
Addicts: Black Meddle, Part II (2010)	Silencing Machine (2012)	The World We Left Behind (2014)

Professional ratings
Review scores
Source	Rating
About.com	4.5/5 stars
Allmusic	4/5 stars
Blistering	9.5/10
Consequence of Sound	4/5 stars
The NewReview	3.5/5 stars
Pitchfork	8/10 stars
PopMatters	9/10 stars
Reflections of Darkness	10/10 stars
Spin	7/10

Silencing Machine is the sixth full-length album by black metal band Nachtmystium. It was released via Century Media Records in the United States on July 30, 2012.

Limited edition includes an additional bonus track "Ashes to Ashes". This track is a rerecorded version of the same track on the Nachtmystium's 2004 album Demise.

== Track listing ==
No.	Title	Length
1.	"Dawn Over the Ruins of Jerusalem"	4:28
2.	"Silencing Machine"	6:26
3.	"And I Control You"	6:14
4.	"The Lepers of Destitution"	8:29
5.	"Borrowed Hope and Broken Dreams"	5:09
6.	"I Wait in Hell"	5:45
7.	"Decimation, Annihilation"	4:54
8.	"Reduced to Ashes"	5:07
9.	"Give Me the Grave"	5:29
10.	"These Rooms in Which We Weep"	7:37
Total length:		59:38

Limited edition bonus track
No.	Title	Length
11.	"Ashes to Ashes"	8:16
Total length:		67:54

=== LP release ===
Side A
No.	Title	Length
1.	"Dawn Over the Ruins of Jerusalem"	4:28
2.	"Silencing Machine"	6:25
3.	"And I Control You"	6:14

Side B
No.	Title	Length
1.	"The Lepers of Destitution"	8:29
2.	"Borrowed Hope and Broken Dreams"	5:09
3.	"I Wait in Hell"	5:45

Side C
No.	Title	Length
1.	"Decimation, Annihilation"	4:54
2.	"Reduced to Ashes"	5:08

Side D
No.	Title	Length
1.	"Give Me the Grave"	5:29
2.	"These Rooms in Which We Weep"	7:38

== Personnel ==
Nachtmystium

- Blake Judd – vocals, guitar, synthesizer
- Andrew "Aamonael" Markuszewski – vocals, guitar
- Will Lindsay – bass
- Charlie Fell – drum, percussion
- Sanford Parker – keyboard, synthesizer

Additional musicians

- Matthias Vogels – guitar, synthesizer
- Bruce Lamont, Chris Black, Matt McGoat – additional vocals

Technical personnel

- Rebecca Clegg – artwork
- Collin Jordan – mastering
- Sanford Parker – mixing and engineering
- Nachtmystium (Sanford Parker) – production
- Christophe Szpajdel — logo
