= Twilight (band) =

- Origin: California, U.S.
- Genres: Black metal, post-metal
- Years active: 2005–2014
- Labels: Total Holocaust, Southern Lord, Battle Kommand
- Website: Website on Southern Lord Records

Twilight is an American black metal supergroup formed in 2005 and originally commissioned by the Swedish underground label Total Holocaust Records. Members of the band are all a part of well known projects within the black metal genre or otherwise including Xasthur, Leviathan, Krieg, Isis, Nachtmystium, Draugar, Minsk, The Atlas Moth and Sonic Youth.

Members of the group have included "Azentrius" (real name Blake Judd of Nachtmystium), "Hildolf" (real name Tim Lehi), "Imperial" (real name Neill Jameson), "Malefic" (real name Scott Conner) and "Wrest" (real name Jef Whitehead).

== History ==
Although Twilight has so far released three albums and have not performed in public, they have been described as a "supergroup" of sorts on the American black metal underground. The band members have, namely, gained their recognition with such outfits as Draugar, Krieg, Leviathan, Nachtmystium and Xasthur. The first album was "recorded on four-track cassettes sent back and forth through the mail by the five members" and "captures the myriad sonic idiosyncrasies of the individual players, from Xasthur’s charred synth ambience and Leviathan’s expert d-drum patterns to Draugar’s cavernous vocals and Nachtmystium’s ruthless guitar torture". Metal Hammer journalist Gunnar Sauermann listed Twilight as an essential US black metal album.

An announcement was made that Twilight disbanded. Battle Kommand Records had previously issued a statement that writing for a second album had begun in 2006 and that recordings commenced in the Spring of 2007, but no release date was ever announced. Malefic left the band in 2007 and was supposed to be replaced by Aaron Turner (of Isis and Old Man Gloom).

In 2009, Twilight reformed with original members Blake Judd (having dropped the "Azentrius" alias), Imperial (now called "N. Imperial"), and Wrest (referred to simply as "W.") joined by new members Sanford Parker, Aaron Turner, and Stavros Giannopolous (along with guest Robert Lowe of Lichens) to record a new album called Monument to Time End, recorded in 2009 and released in 2010 by Southern Lord Records.

On August 1, 2012, it was announced that Thurston Moore of Sonic Youth would be joining the band.

In November, 2013, the band finished recording its final studio album, III: Beneath Trident's Tomb. It was released on 18 March 2014.

== Musical style ==
According to Sauermann, the members are egocentric and assert themselves at diverse points in the recordings, leading to influences from black, thrash and death metal appearing through a "washed-out" production, which hides "great melodies, bare hate and leaden solitude".

== Members ==
Last-known Line-up

- Wrest (Jef Whitehead) – drums, guitar, bass, synthesizer and E-bow (Leviathan, Lurker Of Chalice)
- Imperial (Neill Jameson) – vocals and bass (Krieg, N.I.L.)
- Sanford Parker – guitars, synths, production (Minsk, Nachtmystium, Buried At Sea)
- Stavros Giannopolous – guitars (The Atlas Moth)
- Thurston Moore – guitar (Sonic Youth, Chelsea Light Moving)

Former

- Hildolf (Tim Lehi) – Vocals, guitar (Draugar, Eerie) (2005-2007)
- Malefic (Scott Conner) – guitar, synthesizer and vocals (also see: Xasthur) (2005-2008)
- Blake Judd (formerly known as Azentrius) – guitar, bass, and vocals (Nachtmystium, Hate Meditation) (2005-2012)
- Aaron Turner – guitar and vocals (Isis, Old Man Gloom, House of Low Culture, Lotus Eaters, Jodis) (2007-2008)

== Discography ==
- Twilight (2005)
- Monument to Time End (2010)
- III: Beneath Trident's Tomb (2014)
- Trident Death Rattle (EP) (2018)
