= Scion Rock Fest =

American annual music festival

- Genre: Death metal, grindcore, thrash metal, doom metal, stoner rock, sludge metal, hardcore punk, metalcore, experimental metal
- Locations: Atlanta, GA, Columbus, OH, Pomona, CA, Tampa, FL, Memphis, TN, United States
- Years active: 2009-2014
- Website: www.scionav.com/rockfest

Scion Rock Fest was an annual heavy metal music festival held in various cities throughout the United States. The festival lineups included bands from several genres of metal, such as death metal, grindcore, doom metal, metalcore, and experimental metal, and booked headliners that include Cannibal Corpse, Mastodon, Morbid Angel, Down, and Sleep. The festival was produced by Scion's lifestyle marketing brand, Scion AV, and admission was free every year. Live video recordings and band interviews were also released after each fest.

== History ==
Scion Rock Fest was established in 2009 as part of Scion AV's involvement in the metal music genre. The five festivals that occurred since 2009 featured performances from 110 bands from all over North America, Europe, and Asia.

== Venues & Lineups ==
=== 2009 ===
The first Scion Rock Fest took place on Saturday, February 28 in Atlanta, GA at The Masquerade and an outdoor stage.

2009 Lineup
Outdoor Stage	The Masquerade "Hell"	The Masquerade "Purgatory"	The Masquerade "Heaven"
Mastodon; Neurosis; High on Fire; Pig Destroyer; Boris; Baroness; Torche; Kylesa	1349; Nachtmystium (did not perform); Wolves in the Throne Room; Krallice; Withered; U.S. Christmas; Salome; Apocalyptic Visions	Zoroaster; Coalesce; Týr; Rwake; Harvey Milk; A Storm of Light; Alestorm; Suidakra; Gaylord	Converge; Cryptopsy; Septic Flesh; Warbringer; Toxic Holocaust; Skeletonwitch; Trash Talk; Evil Army

=== 2010 ===
Scion Rock Fest 2010 took place on Saturday, March 13 at four venues in Columbus, OH.

2010 Lineup
Newport Music Hall	Skully's	Bernie's Distillery	Circus
Cannibal Corpse; Voivod; D.R.I. 3 Inches of Blood; Hate Eternal; Landmine Marathon	Shrinebuilder; YOB; Pelican; Acrassicauda; Struck By Lightning; Black Tusk	Absu; Ludicra; Black Anvil; Liturgy; Lightning Swords of Death; Lullabye Arkestra	Brutal Truth; Magrudergrind; Trap Them; Thou; Saviours; Deadsea

=== 2011 ===
Scion Rock Fest 2011 took place on Saturday, March 5 at two venues and two outdoor stages in Pomona, CA.

2011 Lineup
Fox Theater	The Glass House	Outdoor Tent #1	Outdoor Tent #2
Morbid Angel; Obituary; Agalloch; Floor; Kvelertak (did not perform); Crom; Black Cobra (replaced Kvelertak)	Municipal Waste; Death Angel; Immolation; Atheist; Bonded by Blood; Christian Mistress	Integrity; Bastard Noise; Black Breath; Nails; Primate; Fuck the Facts; Wormrot	Anaal Nathrakh; Dispirit; Necrite; The Body; Cough; Woe; Dark Castle

=== 2012 ===
Scion Rock Fest 2012 took place on Saturday, June 2 at four venues in Tampa, FL.

2012 Lineup
The Ritz Ybor	The Orpheum	Czar Bar	Crowbar
Down; Sleep; Saint Vitus; Church of Misery; Witch Mountain; Atlas Moth	Exodus; Suffocation; Origin; Revocation; Decapitated; Party Time; Flyingsnakes	Merzbow + Balázs Pándi; Oxbow; Wold; Psychic TV; Vermapyre; Ides of Gemini	Repulsion; Sick of it All; Terror; Phobia; Cerebral Ballzy; All Pigs Must Die; Cellgraft

=== 2013 ===
On March 6, 2013, Scion announced that the next festival would take place on June 1, 2013, in Memphis, Tennessee. The full lineup for the 2013 festival was announced on March 26, 2013. The 2013 festival took place at five venues on Beale Street in Memphis.

2013 Lineup
New Daisy	Handy Park	Club 152	Hard Rock Cafe	Coyote Ugly
Testament; Melvins; Municipal Waste; Corrosion of Conformity; Vektor; A Life Once Lost	Whitechapel; Six Feet Under; Noisem; Impaled; Arsis; Gigan; Complete Failure	The Obsessed; Pallbearer; The Gates of Slumber; SubRosa; Ice Dragon; Inter Arma	The Casualties; Negative Approach; Touché Amoré; Vision of Disorder; Code Orange Kids; Rotting Out; Call of the Void	Royal Thunder; The Shrine; Indian Handcrafts; Hot Lunch; Dirty Streets; ASG

=== 2014 ===
The 2014 Scion Rock Fest was announced on March 13, 2014, to take place in Pomona, CA. The full festival lineup was announced on March 25, 2014.

2014 Lineup
Fox Theater	The Glass House	Sky Fox Lounge	Acerogami
Machine Head; High on Fire; Red Fang; Crowbar; Orchid; Big Business; King Buzzo	Midnight; BL'AST! Exhumed; Power Trip; In Cold Blood; Speedwolf; Nekrogoblikon	Coffins; Jex Thoth; Windhand; Lord Dying; MOAB; Black Sheep Wall	Aqua Nebula Oscillator; All Them Witches; Hot Lunch; The Well; Pins of Light; Carousel

== Controversy ==
In the weeks leading up to the first Scion Rock Fest in 2009, Scion removed Nachtmystium from the lineup due to alleged ties to Nazism. The band's first album, Reign of the Malicious, was distributed via the National Socialist Black Metal record label Unholy Records. The band was outspoken about the accusations and denied any true ties to the Nazi movement.

Several months before Scion Rock Fest 2012 and before the final lineup had been officially announced, the American sludge metal band Eyehategod announced on their Facebook page that they had been banned by Scion Audio/Visual from performing at Scion Rock Fest. Brian Patton, a guitarist in the band, later told The Age of Metal in a phone interview that Scion Audio/Visual had originally approached the band to perform at the 2012 festival, but later rescinded the offer due to their lyrical content and the religious connotations in the band's name.
