= Kitsune (EP) =

EP by Marriages
- Released: May 1, 2012
- Recorded: December 2011 – January 2012
- Genre: Alternative rock, post-rock, experimental rock
- Length: 25:54
- Label: Sargent House

Marriages chronology
Kitsune (2012)	Salome (2015)

Professional ratings
Aggregate scores
Source	Rating
Metacritic	80/100
Review scores
Source	Rating
AbsolutePunk	8.8/10
Drowned in Sound	7/10
MusicOMH	4/5 stars
Punknews.org	3.5/5 stars
Spin	6/10

Kitsune is the first EP from American rock band Marriages. It was released on May 1, 2012, by Sargent House. The EP title "Kitsune" is also the name for a fox spirit in Japanese folklore. The EP cover depicts a woman transforming into a fox spirit and back again.

== Track listing ==
No.	Title	Length
1.	"Ride in my Place"	3:28
2.	"Body of Shade"	3:43
3.	"Ten Tiny Fingers"	5:06
4.	"Pelt"	3:06
5.	"White Shape"	3:40
6.	"Part the Dark Again"	6:54
Total length:		25:54

Japanese import bonus track
No.	Title	Length
7.	"Pyramids"	4:47
Total length:		30:41

== Personnel ==
Kitsune album personnel adapted from AllMusic.

- Dave Clifford – drums, additional guitar on "Pelt"
- Emma Ruth Rundle – flute, guitar, layout, photography, piano, vocals
- Greg Burns – bass, layout, photography, synthesizer
- JJ Golden – mastering at Golden Mastering
- Toshi Kasai – engineer, mixing at Entourage Studio
