= Twilight (Twilight album) =

Studio album by Twilight
- Released: August 17, 2005
- Genre: Black metal
- Length: 44:19
- Label: Total Holocaust Records

Twilight chronology
Twilight (2005)	Monument to Time End (2010)

Twilight is the debut album by black metal band Twilight. It was released in 2005.

== Track listing ==
No.	Title	Length
1.	"Woe Is the Contagion"	4:33
2.	"Exact Agony, Take Life"	3:06
3.	"Larval Liaise"	5:27
4.	"As the March of Worms"	4:31
5.	"Winter Before"	7:13
6.	"White Fire Under Black Text"	4:31
7.	"Hopeless Etheride"	3:09
8.	"Swollen Voices in Silence"	3:30
9.	"Beyond Light (Beautiful and Malignant)"	8:19

== Personnel ==
- Malefic - Guitars, vocals, keyboards
- Tim Lehi - Guitars, vocals
- Neill Jameson - Vocals, bass
- Wrest - Drums, guitars, bass, keyboards, effects
- Blake Judd - Guitars, vocals, bass
