= Marriages (band) =

American rock band

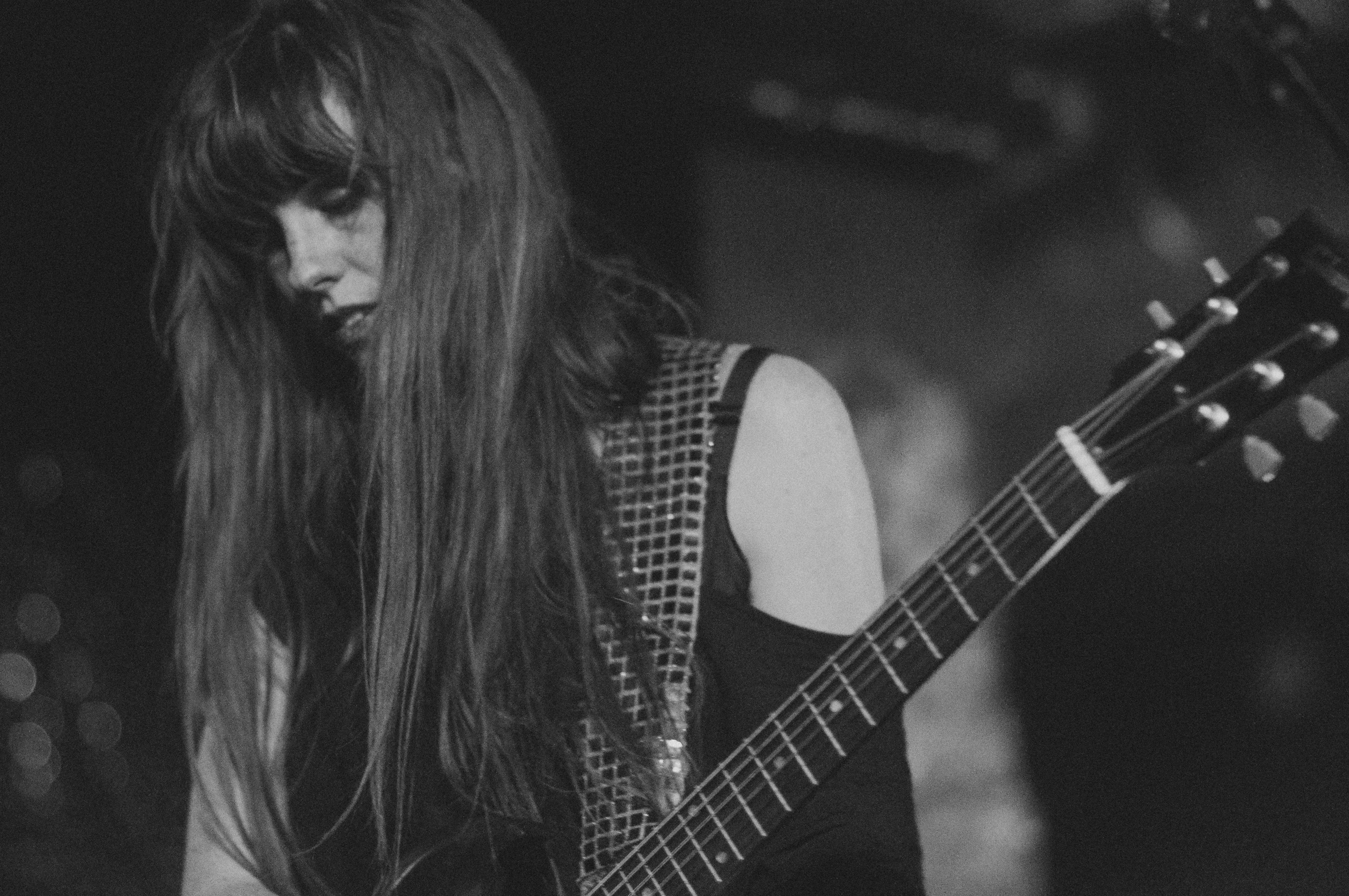
- Rundle performing with Marriages in 2013

Background information
- Origin: Los Angeles, California, U.S.
- Genres: Post-rock, alternative rock, experimental rock, post-metal
- Years active: 2011–2015
- Labels: Sargent House
- Spinoffs: Drab Majesty
- Spinoff of: Red Sparrowes, Nocturnes
- Past members: Emma Ruth Rundle; Greg Burns; Andrew Clinco; Dave Clifford

Marriages was an American rock band from Los Angeles, California that formed in 2011. The band's final lineup consisted of vocalist and guitarist Emma Ruth Rundle, bassist Greg Burns and drummer Andrew Clinco.

The band has been inactive since 2015, and Rundle said in 2021 that the band was not planning on releasing new material. Since then, Rundle has put out multiple solo albums while Clinco has continued with his project Drab Majesty.

== History ==
Following the hiatus of Red Sparowes, two members of that band, Emma Ruth Rundle (also formerly of the Nocturnes) and Greg Burns (ex-Halifax Pier), formed Marriages. The band played its first show on November 28, 2011 opening for Russian Circles, and signed to the Sargent House label alongside fellow opening act Deafheaven.

The group recorded the Kitsune EP with drummer Dave Clifford. It was released in 2012 on Sargent House, and was followed by tours with Russian Circles and Chelsea Wolfe in 2012 and Deafheaven in 2013. In late 2012, drummer Andrew Clinco was brought in as a permanent member of the band, replacing Clifford. Influenced by Rundle, Clinco learned how to play the guitar for his new project, Drab Majesty.

In 2014, the group completed recording for their debut studio album, Salome, while Rundle simultaneously recorded and released her solo debut Some Heavy Ocean (she has also recorded under the name the Headless Prince of Zolpidem). Salome was released on April 7, 2015 by Sargent House, preceded by a U.S. tour with Helms Alee and followed by a European tour with Wovenhand.

The band has been inactive since 2015. In a December 2016 interview, Rundle stated that the band had written no new music, but had intentions of doing something at a later date. By 2021, however, Rundle stated in a Reddit AMA that there was "no intention" of further material from Marriages.

== Band members ==
Final lineup

- Emma Ruth Rundle – guitar, vocals (2011–2015)
- Greg Burns – bass, keyboards, programming (2011–2015)
- Andrew Clinco – drums (2012–2015)

Former members

- Dave Clifford – drums (2012)

== Discography ==
=== Studio albums ===
- Salome (2015, Sargent House)

=== EPs ===
- Kitsune (2012, Sargent House)
