= Engine of Hell =

Studio album by Emma Ruth Rundle
- Released: November 5th, 2021
- Studios: Panoramic House, Marin County, California
- Genres: Alternative rock; indie folk
- Length: 40:49
- Label: Sargent House
- Producer: Sonny Diperri

Emma Ruth Rundle chronology
May Our Chambers Be Full (2020)	Engine of Hell (2021)

Engine of Hell is the fifth solo album by Emma Ruth Rundle, released via the Sargent House label on November 5, 2021.

In contrast to other Rundle albums, Engine of Hell took a minimalistic approach to its production, relying on few overdubs and preferring raw recording, and its composition, emphasising acoustic instruments and not relying on additional musicians.

== Critical reception ==
Professional ratings
Aggregate scores
Source	Rating
Metacritic	82/100
Review scores
Source	Rating
AllMusic	3.5/5 stars
Beats Per Minute	78%
Flood Magazine	8/10
Kerrang!	4/5 stars
Loud and Quiet	5/10
Mojo	4/5 stars
New Noise Magazine	5/5 stars
Pitchfork	7.2
The Skinny	4/5 stars
Sputnikmusic	5.0/5

Engine of Hell received mainly positive reviews from critics, with most praising its minimalistic production and brooding atmosphere, and the vunerable and open lyricisim of the songs. Andrew Sacher of BrooklynVegan said that the album is "...gripping in its minimalism," and claimed, "People throw around this phrase, but it rarely gets more hauntingly gorgeous than this." Manish Argawal of Mojo wrote, "Engine Of Hell sees the Californian singer-songwriter ditch her signature expansive arrangements for an eight-song set of piano-framed ballads that dig deep into youthful memories. This newfound instrumental austerity can be forbidding at first, but repeated spins reveal lyrically acute portraits of grieving a family member during childhood (Body); a loved one battling addiction (Blooms Of Oblivion, cut with acoustic guitar and violin); and, less ominously, enjoying music with a friend (Dancing Man). Rundle has written movingly on social media of struggling with pandemic enforced isolation, and the quietly majestic Return, with its poetic allusions to loss and loneliness, will resonate with many who have felt the same," and awarded the album 4 out of 5 stars.

Sputnikmusic staff member "Dewinged" gave the album 5 out of 5 stars, and related the album's aura to the experience of losing their mother, stating, " Emma's fifth album is difficult to judge, to critic, to write about. How can anyone treat a collection of songs that come from the deeper corners of the heart with something as banal as an objective take on it? I refuse to do so. I listen to 'Blooms of Oblivion' and I feel the kind of vertigo I felt when the last tie with she who brought me into this world was severed without a warning. Emma has recreated with a few notes, a few chords, and a few words, the sound of a scream lost in the abyss. Even the Bandcamp page for the album features a black background and no description whatsoever. This is the artist in her purest and most essential form, and no press release, promo material or review could ever describe what lies beyond the music."

Aaron Kavanagh of New Noise Magazine also gave the album 5 out of 5 stars, calling it "Rundle's magnum opus," and stating, "How does one begin to describe Emma Ruth Rundle’s new album Engine of Hell? Well, take every synonym for the word 'perfect' that is available from every language in the world and attribute them to this album, and that may be a start." In comparing it to the reception to Slint's Spiderland, Kavanagh claimed, "It may not become a big commercial mainstream hit, and potentially may even go unappreciated initially, but in time it will be considered a favorite album of music fans the world over."

Angela Davey of Kerrang! gave the album 4 out of 5 stars and stated, "Despite its minimalism, this is some of her heaviest-hitting material yet. The lyrics are wrought with dark meaning and somber emotion, and the lack of accompanying instruments makes their impact all the more poignant" and "Although the gear may have shifted down, the creative vision of Emma Ruth Rundle continues to moves onward. With just two alternating instruments and the dulcet tones of her voice she’s able to convey and invoke more emotion than a fully equipped band. Engine Of Hell is not only a testament to her seemingly endless talent, but an unadulterated glimpse at a human being’s soul." Also giving the album 4 out of 5 stars, Tony Inglis of The Skinny, claimed "...Engine of Hell is also a heavy album that reaches unflinchingly back into the past, though this time Rundle’s music is stripped of the sonic indicators of heaviness, using only acoustic instruments; she has likened piano – prevalent across these eight songs – to a time machine."

Giving the album an 8 out of 10, Douglas Menagh of Flood Magazine stated, "On Engine of Hell, Rundle has built a world through music that has a distinct feeling of isolation and distance. By emphasizing piano, acoustic guitar, and vocals, it also has the feeling of the distant past ricocheting across time. While past records like 2014’s Some Heavy Ocean explore goth-pop, Engine of Hell leans fully into the Gothic. There’s a literary quality to Rundle’s poetic songwriting through reflection and imagery..." Also giving the album an 8 out of 10, Sam Khaneka of Distorted Sound stated, "With such an understated approach, some may assume that this is a 'simple' album in comparison to Rundle’s previous efforts. However, that would be to underestimate the skill and complexity required to write music that compels despite few embellishments – let alone the difficulty in exercising enough restraint to keep it that way."

James Christopher Monger of AllMusic claimed, "Rundle has tempered her sweeping post-rock cinematics with lyrical vulnerability in the past, but Engine of Hell is a braver and bolder beast, as it lays bare the soul of its creator and dares the listener to reckon with it," and awarded the album a 3.5 out of 5 stars. Sam Walton of Loud and Quiet was more critical of the album and gave it a 5 out of 10. Walton felt that the new approach to the album felt "...more like an MTV Unplugged version of a unheard [sic] bigger album, with all the accompanying jarring internal contradictions of scale and sense of sonic amputation: the intimacy feels confected and performed rather than organic, and there’s the frequent impression of a singer straining at the leash, desperate to break free of newly muted confines."

Writing for Beats Per Minute, John Amen gave the album 78% and concluded, "While some of the instrumental interplays and gestalts of Rundle’s previous work are undeniably stunning, Engine of Hell underscores her gifts as a songwriter and for minimalistic arrangement, also illustrating her talent for unadorned performance. Moving from fetes of sinister folk to unbridled metal splurges to, now, an exemplarily intimate sequence, Rundle emerges as one of the more versatile artists working today."

== Track listing ==
No.	Title	Length
1.	"Return"	5:16
2.	"Blooms of Oblivion"	5:39
3.	"Body"	5:26
4.	"The Company"	4:11
5.	"Dancing Man"	5:22
6.	"Razor's Edge"	4:10
7.	"Citadel"	5:38
8.	"In My Afterlife"	6:01
Total length:		40:49

== Charts ==
Chart performance for Engine of Hell
Chart (2021)	Peak position
UK Independent Albums (Official Charts)	26
