= Monument to Time End =

Studio album by Twilight
- Released: August 27, 2010
- Genre: Black metal; post-metal
- Length: 58:19
- Label: Daymare Recordings

Twilight chronology
Twilight (2005)	Monument to Time End (2010)	III: Beneath Trident's Tomb (2014)

Monument to Time End is the second album by the black metal band Twilight. It was released in 2010.

== Track listing ==
No.	Title	Length
1.	"The Cryptic Ascension"	9:52
2.	"Fall Behind Eternity"	9:45
3.	"8,000 Years"	5:39
4.	"Red Fields"	6:36
5.	"Convulsions in Wells of Fever"	5:14
6.	"Decaying Observer"	9:08
7.	"The Catastrophe Exhibition"	7:03
8.	"Negative Signal Omega"	5:02

== Credits ==
- Neill Jameson - Vocals
- Aaron Turner - Vocals, guitars, effects
- Stavros Giannopoulos - Guitars
- Sanford Parker - Keyboards, effects
- Wrest - Drums, Bass, guitars
- Blake Judd - Guitars, vocals
