= Assassins: Black Meddle, Part I =

Assassins: Black Meddle, Part 1

Studio album by Nachtmystium
- Released: June 10, 2008
- Recorded: December 2007 at Volume Studios
- Genre: Black metal, psychedelic rock, progressive metal, black 'n' roll
- Length: 45:05
- Label: Century Media
- Producer: Nachtmystium, Chris Black & Sanford Parker

Nachtmystium chronology
Worldfall (2008)	Assassins: Black Meddle, Part 1 (2008)	Addicts: Black Meddle, Part II (2010)

Assassins: Black Meddle, Part 1 is the fourth full-length album by American band Nachtmystium. It was released via Century Media Records in the United States on June 10, 2008, and by Candlelight Records in Europe on June 23, 2008. The record was recorded in December 2007 at Sanford Parker's Volume Studios. The album contains such experimental musical flirtations as saxophones and other non-black metal musical "meddling".

== Background ==
Blake Judd, the band's co-founder and front-man wanted to create an album that focused on experimental and progressive metal with a black metal influence. Assassins was intended to be the band's departure from the traditional black metal genre. In an interview with the Chicago Tribune, Judd, the band's founder, claims the idea for the album's name came from his desire to reestablish Nachtmystium's image in the music community. He states, "The idea of 'Assassins' is that an assassin kills, gets rid of or destroys something. It's not directly about us. We want to assassinate all these preconceived notions about where the metal community feels we belong in music and want to do our own thing. And what we do is black meddle." The album's subtitle itself incorporates the title of Pink Floyd's 1971 breakthrough album Meddle, while the album's opening track, "One of These Nights", is a homage to the Meddle's "One of These Days".

Judd recruited producer Sanford Parker to lead the album's production and audio engineering, and veteran drummer Tony Laureano. Other guest artists were featured on the album, including Bruce Lamount of Yakuza, who provided a saxophone solo on the track “Oceanborn”. The band uploaded "Your True Enemy", a song from Assassins, onto their MySpace page in February 2008, and the title track "Assassins" in April 2008.

Daymare Recordings released a Japanese version of Assassins: Black Meddle, Part 1 with bonus tracks on June 20, 2008.

== Track listing ==
All lyrics are written by Chris Black, except where noted; all music is composed by Blake Judd, except where noted

No.	Title	Lyrics	Music	Length
1.	"One of These Nights"			1:50
2.	"Assassins"	Judd		8:07
3.	"Ghosts of Grace"	Black, Judd	Black, Judd	4:49
4.	"Away from the Light" (Instrumental)		Black	2:19
5.	"Your True Enemy"		Judd, Jeff Wilson	4:15
6.	"Code Negative"	Lord Imperial		6:48
7.	"Omnivore"		Judd, Wilson	5:05
8.	"Seasick (Part 1: Drowned at Dusk)"			4:52
9.	"Seasick (Part 2: Oceanborne)"			2:48
10.	"Seasick (Part 3: Silent Sunrise)"			4:12

== Reception ==
Professional ratings
Review scores
Source	Rating
Allmusic	4.5/5 stars
IGN	9/10
Pitchfork Media	8.9/10
PopMatters	8/10 stars

Assassins was generally met with positive critical reception. Music critics praised Nachtmysitum's experimental approach and innovative take on black metal. Carlos Ramirez of IGN gave Assassins a 9/10 rating, as well as an editors choice award. Ramirez later named Assassins on his list of "10 Great Black Metal Albums." Brent Burton of the Washington City Paper believed Assassins featured a more mature sound compared to Nachtmystium's other releases. He also praised the band for incorporating jazz and psychedelic elements into their black metal sound. KNAC echoed a similar sentiment, and gave the album an 'A'-rating. They described the album, stating, "Atop a raw, furious black metal foundation, Nachtmystium – whose earlier work was way more 'true Norwegian black metal'-inspired, a la Darkthrone – add a liberal helping of [progressive], psychedelia and classic rock, and bring it all together with organic, retro production to craft something utterly unique and pretty damn cool." Pitchfork Media lauded Assassins was one 2008's top releases, and gave it an 8.9 out of 10. Reviewer Brandon Stosuy claimed their sound to be "unique, powerful blend of 70s-drenched black'n'roll." He went on to further claim, "Assassins contains big, almost stadium-sized anthems, monumental drinking songs, gorgeous instrumental excursions, prog-metal, and solos that make you catch your breath". Noisecreep ranked the album number 10 in its Best Albums of the 2000s list, calling it "a dizzying union of psychedelic-rock atmospherics and black metal might".

However, Jon Caramanica of The New York Times considered Assassins to be "more pedestrian" in contrast to Nachtmystium's previous release, Instinct: Decay. He commented, "Most of the songs from the new album, especially “Ghosts of Grace,” were corrosive, dense and technically flamboyant. And Mr. Judd's growl was heavy, forgoing the lucidity he gave it on record."

== Personnel ==
=== Nachtmystium ===
- Blake Judd – lead guitars, lead vocals
- Jeff Wilson – rhythm guitars
- Zion Meagher – bass, backing vocals
- Tony Laureano – drums, percussion

=== Additional musicians ===
- Chris Black – keyboards, programming
- Bruce Lamont – saxophone
- Sanford Parker – moog synthesizer, keyboards, effects
- Matt Johnsen – guest lead guitar on tracks 2, 8, 9, 10
- Jeff Sealy – guest lead guitar on tracks 5, 6

=== Production ===
- Produced by Sanford Parker and Nachtmystium
- Engineered and mixed by Sanford Parker
- Mastered by Collin Jordan
