= The Fear Is Excruciating, but Therein Lies the Answer =

Studio album by Red Sparowes
- Released: April 6, 2010
- Recorded: August – September 2009
- Studio: Infrasonic Sound, Los Angeles
- Genre: Post-rock; Post-metal
- Length: 43:02
- Label: Sargent House
- Producer: Red Sparowes, Toshi Kasai

Red Sparowes chronology
Aphorisms (2008)	The Fear Is Excruciating, but Therein Lies the Answer (2010)

The Fear Is Excruciating, but Therein Lies the Answer is the third studio album by post-rock band Red Sparowes, released April 6, 2010.

== Track listing ==
Professional ratings
Review scores
Source	Rating
AbsolutePunk	(8.4/10)
PopMatters	8/10 stars
Pitchfork Media	(5.2/10)
Is This Revolutionary?	4.5/5 stars

No.	Title	Length
1.	"Truths Arise"	1:49
2.	"In Illusions of Order"	7:37
3.	"A Hail of Bombs"	4:22
4.	"Giving Birth to Imagined Saviors"	6:09
5.	"A Swarm"	7:11
6.	"In Every Mind"	3:06
7.	"A Mutiny"	5:32
8.	"As Each End Looms and Subsides"	7:16
Total length:		43:02

== Personnel ==
Red Sparowes

- Bryant Clifford Meyer – guitar, electric piano, synthesizer, vocals
- Greg Burns – bass guitar, pedal steel guitar, vocals
- David Clifford – drums, percussion, vocals
- Andy Arahood – guitar, electric piano, synthesizer, vocals
- Emma Ruth Rundle – guitar, vocals

Additional

- Laura Kass – violin on "In Illusions of Order" and "A Mutiny"
- Toshi Kasai – recording engineer, mixing
- Brian Gardner – mastering
- Gregory Burns – art design and photography
- Sonny Kay – layout
