= Emma Ruth Rundle =

American singer (born 1983)

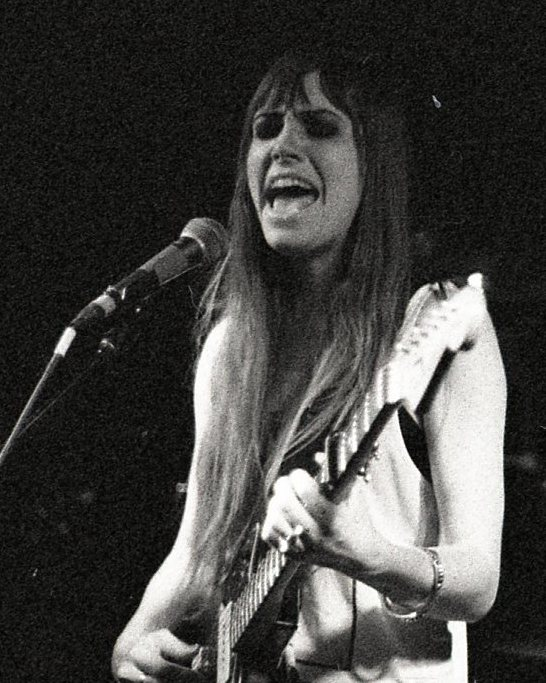
- Rundle in 2014

Background information
- Born: October 10, 1983 (age 42); Santa Monica, California, U.S.
- Genres: Ambient; folk; post-rock
- Occupations: Singer-songwriter; musician; poet; visual artist
- Instruments: Vocals; guitar; piano
- Years active: 2007–present
- Labels: Errant Child; Sargent House
- Member of: Red Sparowes
- Formerly of: The Nocturnes; Marriages
- Website: www.emmaruthrundle.com

Emma Ruth Rundle (born October 10, 1983) is an American singer-songwriter, guitarist, visual artist and poet based in Portland, Oregon. Formerly of the Nocturnes and Marriages, she has released five solo albums and is a member of Red Sparowes.

== Early life ==
Rundle was born on October 10, 1983, in Santa Monica, California. Her father is a pianist. She was raised in Los Angeles with her younger sister Sarah in a household where a lot of folk music was played. She moved “back and forth between the Westside and Eastside” when she was growing up before attending Eagle Rock High School. As a teenager, Rundle lived with her grandmother until the end of her life.

At age eight, and after a massive earthquake in her hometown, her mother took her into the legendary folk music store McCabe's and told her she could pick one instrument to rent for lessons. She initially chose the Celtic harp, and later went on to work at McCabe's for 13 years. She moved on to guitar when she was twelve years old and begin to write her own songs when she was thirteen years old. She also started playing the piano under guidance of her father after abandoning the Celtic harp, which was her primary instrument up to her teenage years. But when she began playing in bands she realized that a keyboard sounded unacceptable on stage and couldn't replicate the sound of a real piano, and moving a keyboard proved too physically taxing for her, making it too cumbersome for her to use. So she decided to stick with a guitar from then on, and wouldn't reprioritize a piano until 2021's Engine of Hell. She spent a year at CalArts, where she studied music technology, which included individual classes under the tutelage of Miroslav Tadić, before dropping out.

== Career ==
=== 2007–2018 ===
After staying a year in New Zealand, she returned to the United States and got back involved in the Los Angeles music scene. During that period she started her own band in 2007, the Nocturnes, and released the Wellington EP (2008) and two albums, A Year of Spring (2009) and Aokigahara (2011), with the latter released via Errant Child Records. The sound of the band was described as folkgaze with elements of chamber-pop, goth, and post-rock. Around this time, the post-rock band Red Sparowes announced in June 2009 that Rundle had joined the band as a guitarist, where she replaced Josh Graham, who had departed the band the previous year. She played on their third and final album, The Fear Is Excruciating, But Therein Lies the Answer, released by Sargent House on April 6, 2010. Tool and Melvins producer Toshi Kasai was credited with the production on the album.

She self-released an ambient guitar album, Electric Guitar: One, in 2011. It was later reissued in 2014 by Errant Child Recordings. That same year, she formed the trio Marriages with her fellow Red Sparowes bandmates Greg Burns and Dave Clifford, for the release of their first EP, 2012's Kitsune. Kitsune was created in a short timeframe during a brief offtime from Red Sparowes at the end of 2011, Kasai was the producer on the EP. It received generally favorable reviews. Between releases Dave Clifford left the band and would be replaced by Andrew Clinco. This new formation released Marriages' only full-length album, Salome, in 2015.

On January 7, 2013, she independently released the album Somnambulant, attributed to The Headless Prince of Zolpidem, which she described as "my somewhat anonymous downtempo, somewhat creepy electronic dark wave project". In an interview with Ghettoblaster Magazine she confirmed she was behind the semi-secret side project. She originally wanted to explore this project more and it existed before Marriages was formed, but it failed to find a sufficient audience and her very expensive synthesizer was stolen, which she was unable to replace it at the time. In a later interview she has shown a desire to revisit the sound.

Rundle's second solo work, Some Heavy Ocean, was released on May 20, 2014, by Sargent House. Prior to release the album was available on Pitchfork Advance. It was co-produced by Chris Common and recorded at the Sargent House studio. Rundle lived at the studio complex as an artist-in-residence for the period. All of the material on the album was written between the summer of 2012 and 2013, but a significant amount of the arrangements and lyrics were only completed during the lengthy recording process. The title song for the album was previously a dark wave song called The Riches of Summer’s Death, meant for The Headless Prince Of Zolpidem. The release was accompanied by a US tour with King Buzzo. Arms I Know So Well received its own music video, directed by Thomas McMahan.

Rundle suffers from adenomyosis, which in part inspired the material on her third album, Marked for Death, produced by Sonny DiPerri. It was released in October 2016 on Sargent House.

In January 2017, a split EP with Jaye Jayle, titled The Time Between Us, was announced, and the song "The Distance" was made available on streaming platforms. The EP was released by Sargent House on February 24. Rundle also released the song "Forever, As the Setting Son" on January 20, 2017, the date of Donald Trump's inauguration as United States president, with all proceeds donated to Planned Parenthood.

Rundle's fourth studio album, On Dark Horses, was released on September 14, 2018. It featured contributions by Jaye Jayle members Evan Patterson and Todd Cook as well as Dylan Nadon. Also in 2018, Rundle provided backing vocals for "Just Breathe", a song on American rock band Thrice's 2018 album Palms.

=== 2019–present ===
Rundle attended the 2019's Roadburn Festival, where she and the artist in residence at time, the sludge metal band Thou, would team up and perform a couple of new songs they had written for a special set list, with the intention of releasing a collaboration album at a future date. This album was first set in motion when they shared a dressing room at Seattle’s Northwest Terror Fest in 2018, realizing the potential cooperation. Both artists would find value in their partnership, having been longtime admirers of each other's previous work; Rundle admitted in an interview with Guitar World that in 2015 she became obsessed with the band and felt that they had "mutual awareness". Rundle found the partnership fruitful, allowing her to add more heft and broaden the use of the instrumentals compared to her solo releases. All the songs on the project took over a painstaking year to come together, while the recording itself only took three days. In October 2020, their collaboration album, May Our Chambers Be Full, was released. A surprise follow-up EP called The Helm of Sorrow included a cover of the Cranberries song "Hollywood". It consisted of four B-sides from May Our Chambers Be Full that were originally included on the “diehard” edition of the original release.

In August 2019, Roadburn Festival announced that Rundle was one of two curators for the 2020 edition, alongside a scheduled reunion concert for the Red Sparowes following a ten-year long hiatus, but the whole planned event was later cancelled due to the COVID-19 pandemic. On July 3 2020, she released a standalone single named, Staying Power, which she originally recorded during the On Dark Horses studio sessions. The song details the experiences from a touring musician trying to survive and keeping in touch with her own feelings. She made her debut as a feature film composer with the Riley Stearns film Dual. She was first approached by Stearns around the time of On Dark Horses and would score his short 2020's The Blanket as precursor while spending her time that year mostly at home.

After a week-long stay in a mental health hospital helped her get sober from drugs and alcohol, she released her fifth studio solo album, Engine of Hell, in November 2021, to positive critical reception. She later released an EP called Orpheus Looking Back, consisting of three songs that she made during the Engine of Hell recording sessions that didn't make the cut. The first song, "Pump Organ Song", which she created in response to the dissolution of her marriage, was published as a single ahead of its March 25, 2022 release. In support of Engine of Hell and Orpheus Looking Back, she embarked on a short 2023 Spring North American tour, which took place from March 24 and ended at Le Poisson Rouge on April 9. A live recording of Engine of Hell, titled Live At Roadburn, which she performed at 2022's Roadburn Festival, was released separately on July 7, 2023. It was her first independently released album in thirteen years.

On April 8, 2022, she announced a follow-up to her first album, Electric Guitar: One, titled EG2: Dowsing Voice. Despite the name, the album is a departure from her first and the rest of her discography. Rundle described it as a "weird art project" inspired by her stay in coastal Wales in the winter of 2020, where she also recorded the album. It features fully improvised music with special attention on experimental vocals that are devoid of conventional lyrics. It was released on May 13, 2022.

In March 2024, Rundle collaborated with multi-instrumentalist Patrick Shiroishi on a track called "A Sparrow In A Swallow’s Nest". In the song Rundle recites her poem “Paloma” while Shiroishi provides the instrumentals. It was released as the A-side on a 7" single by Shiroishi via Sub Pop on April 12. On the 10th anniversary of her second album, Some Heavy Ocean, she would return to Europe on a tour in August to celebrate the record including a concert at the Supersonic Festival. In August, she announced a fall US tour with Ora Cogan and Storefront Church as the openers. The tour started in late October and ran through December.

Rundle made her literary debut with a collection of poems that was released by Unnamed Press in 2025. The poems were written during her travels over the course of a year. Accompanying the book she will release a limited-edition album that includes piano sketches, which were inspired by Harold Budd, who was major influence on the project.

In June 2026, Rundle announced her sixth album titled These Killing Times alongside the release of the lead single named Powerless. The album was made together with Sonny Diperri with contributions of Patrick Shiroishi, Marissa Nadler, Storefront Church, and Gina Gleason of Baroness among others. Release date is set for September 18 via her own label, Errant Child.

== Personal life ==
Rundle struggled with drug addiction from the age of 12.

She was married to Evan Patterson of Jaye Jayle. They lived in Louisville, Kentucky. Their divorce was finalized in August 2021.

She is a fan of anime.

== Discography ==
=== Solo ===
- Electric Guitar: One (2011, Independent)
- Some Heavy Ocean (2014, Sargent House)
- Marked For Death (2016, Sargent House)
- The Time Between Us EP Split With Jaye Jayle (2017, Sargent House)
- On Dark Horses (2018, Sargent House)
- May Our Chambers Be Full / The Helm Of Sorrow Collaborative Album With Thou (2020, Sacred Bones)
- Engine of Hell (2021, Sargent House)
- Orpheus Looking Back EP (2022, Sargent House)
- EG2: Dowsing Voice (2022, Sargent House)
- These Killing Times (2026, Errant Child)

=== Live albums ===
- Live at Roadburn (2023, Independent)

=== With The Nocturnes ===
- Wellington EP (2008, Independent)
- A Year of Spring (2009, Independent)
- Aokigahara (2011, The Errant Child)

=== With Red Sparowes ===
- The Fear Is Excruciating, but Therein Lies the Answer (2010, Sargent House)

=== With Marriages ===
- Kitsune EP (2012, Sargent House)
- Salome (2015, Sargent House)

=== As The Headless Prince Of Zolpidem ===
- Somnambulant (2013, Self-released)

== Films ==
- Dual - (2022)
