= Eulogy IV =

EP by Nachtmystium
- Released: 2004
- Recorded: February – March, 2004
- Studio: Lakehouse Studio, 1462 Studio
- Genre: Black metal
- Length: 22:02
- Label: Total Holocaust Records
- Producer: Chris Black

Eulogy IV is an EP by the American black metal band Nachtmystium.

Originally released by Total Holocaust Records in 2004, it has been reissued on CD and LP by Southern Lord Records and Kreation Records with additional bonus tracks.

The album received a nine out of ten rating from Chronicles of Chaos.

== Track listing ==
=== Total Holocaust Records version (2004) ===
1. My Vengeance
2. Eulogy IV
3. The Wound Which Cannot Heal
4. You Get Nothing
5. Kronet (Ildjarn cover)
6. Bak to Lysemde Oyne (Ildjarn cover)
7. Satanic Blood (Von cover)

=== Southern Lord Records version (2005) (SUNN42.5) ===
1. "My Vengeance"
2. "Eulogy IV"
3. "Bleed for Thee"
4. "The Wound Which Cannot Heal"
5. "You Get Nothing"
6. "Charioteer (Temple Song)" (Earth cover)
7. "Stemmen Fra Tarnet" (Burzum cover)
8. "Satanic Blood" (Von cover)
9. "Antichrist Messiah/My Vengeance" (Live 12/04)

=== Kreation Records version (2006) ===
1. My Vengeance
2. Eulogy IV
3. Bleed for Thee
4. The Wound Which Cannot Heal
5. You Get Nothing
6. Charioteer (Temple Song) (Earth cover)
7. Stemmen Fra Tårnet (Burzum cover)

=== Century Media version (2006) ===
1. My Vengeance
2. Eulogy IV
3. Bleed for Thee
4. The Wound Which Cannot Heal
5. You Get Nothing

== Personnel ==
=== Additional personnel ===
- Christophe Szpajdel — logo
