= As the Valley of Death Becomes Us, Our Silver Memories Fade =

Studio album by A Storm of Light
- Released: 17 May 2011
- Genre: Post-metal
- Length: 55:08
- Label: Profound Lore Records
- Producer: Josh Graham

A Storm of Light chronology
Forgive Us Our Trespasses (2009)	As the Valley of Death Becomes Us, Our Silver Memories Fade (2011)	Nations To Flames (2013)

Professional ratings
Review scores
Source	Rating
About.com	4/5 stars
Allmusic	4/5 stars
Rockfreaks	7.5/10
Scene Point Blank	7.5/10

As the Valley of Death Becomes Us, Our Silver Memories Fade is the third studio album by American post-metal band A Storm of Light. The album in its entirety is available for streaming on Profound Lore Records' Bandcamp site.

== Track listing ==
No.	Title	Length
1.	"Missing"	6:21
2.	"Collapse"	4:51
3.	"Black Wolves"	6:39
4.	"Destroyer"	5:20
5.	"Wretched Valley"	5:09
6.	"Silver"	5:49
7.	"Leave No Wounds"	3:51
8.	"Death’s Head"	6:10
9.	"Wasteland"	10:50
