= Aphorisms (EP) =

EP by Red Sparowes
- Released: August 1, 2008
- Recorded: June 5, 2008
- Genre: Post-rock
- Length: 17:53
- Producer: Red Sparowes, Toshi Kasai

Red Sparowes chronology
Oh Lord, God of Vengeance, Show Yourself! (2006)	Aphorisms (2008)	The Fear Is Excruciating, but Therein Lies the Answer (2010)

Aphorisms is an EP by post-rock band Red Sparowes, released on Amazon.com as a digital download on July 9, 2008. It was also released a few days later on iTunes. The EP was released on 12" vinyl in November 2009 via Sargent House.

== Track listing ==
1. "We Left the Apes to Rot, but Find the Fang Still Grows Within" - 6:37
2. "Error Has Turned Animals into Men, and to Each the Fold Repeats" - 5:38
3. "The Fear Is Excruciating, but Therein Lies the Answer" - 5:38

== Personnel ==
- Andy Arahood – guitar
- Gregory Burns – bass, pedal steel
- Dave Clifford – drums
- Bryant Clifford Meyer – guitar
- Brendan Tobin – guitar
