= III: Beneath Trident's Tomb =

Studio album by Twilight
- Released: March 17, 2014
- Genre: Black metal
- Length: 41:10
- Label: Century Media Recordings

Twilight chronology
Monument to Time End (2010)	III: Beneath Trident's Tomb (2014)

III: Beneath Trident's Tomb is the third and final album by the black metal band Twilight. It was released in 2014.

== Track listing ==
No.	Title	Length
1.	"Lungs"	3:51
2.	"Oh, Wretched Son"	8:44
3.	"Swarming Funeral Mass"	7:38
4.	"Seek No Shelter, Fevered Ones"	8:45
5.	"A Flood of Eyes"	7:54
6.	"Below Lights"	4:18

== Credits ==
- N. Imperial - Vocals
- Thurston Moore- Vocals, guitars
- Stavros Giannopoulos - Vocals, guitars
- Sanford Parker - Keyboards, effects
- Wrest - Drums, bass, guitars
