= Addicts: Black Meddle, Part II =

Addicts: Black Meddle, Pt. II

Studio album by Nachtmystium
- Released: June 8, 2010
- Recorded: January 2010 at Volume Studios
- Genres: Black metal, psychedelic rock, industrial metal, experimental rock
- Length: 48:01
- Labels: Century Media, Candlelight
- Producers: Chris Black and Nachtmystium

Nachtmystium chronology
Assassins: Black Meddle, Part I (2008)	Addicts: Black Meddle, Pt. II (2010)	Silencing Machine (2012)

Professional ratings
Review scores
Source	Rating
About.com	4.5/5 stars
Allmusic	4.5/5 stars
Metal Injection	8.5/10 stars
Metal Underground	4/5 stars
Pitchfork Media	(8.2/10)
Rock Sound	(8/10)

Addicts: Black Meddle, Pt. II is the fifth full-length album by Chicago band Nachtmystium. It was released via Century Media Records in the United States on June 8, 2010, and by Candlelight Records in Europe a few days later. The recording took place in January 2010 at Volume Studios in Chicago, IL.

Mainman Blake Judd said this about the new album:

The new material is reminiscent of Assassins with more of a rock and roll edge over all. Our love for post-rock and industrial (a la Ministry, Killing Joke, etc.) is even more present this time around. We're hoping to make a record that will continue to push extreme music into uncharted territories.

The album artwork was made by Derek Lea, Jimmy Hubbard and Seldon Hunt. A promotional video on YouTube for the album was released by Century Media on YouTube on April 18, 2010.

All music was written by Nachtmystium, all lyrics written by Chris Black, except "Ruined Life Continuum" which features lyrics by Blake Judd and Chris Black.

== Track listing ==
=== CD release ===
No.	Title	Length
1.	"Cry for Help"	1:33
2.	"High on Hate"	3:36
3.	"Nightfall"	3:21
4.	"No Funeral"	5:39
5.	"Then Fires"	5:44
6.	"Addicts"	4:24
7.	"The End Is Eternal"	7:03
8.	"Blood Trance Fusion"	3:30
9.	"Ruined Life Continuum"	4:41
10.	"Every Last Drop"	8:30

=== LP release ===
Side A
No.	Title	Writer(s)	Length
1.	"Cry for Help"	M: Nachtmystium, L: Chris Black	1:33
2.	"High on Hate"	M: Nachtmystium, L: Chris Black	3:36

Side B
No.	Title	Writer(s)	Length
1.	"Nightfall"	M: Nachtmystium, L: Chris Black	3:21
2.	"No Funeral"	M: Nachtmystium, L: Chris Black	5:39
3.	"Then Fires"	M: Nachtmystium, L: Chris Black	5:44

Side C
No.	Title	Writer(s)	Length
1.	"Addicts"	M: Nachtmystium, L: Chris Black	4:24
2.	"The End Is Eternal"	M: Nachtmystium, L: Chris Black	7:03
3.	"Blood Trance Fusion"	M: Nachtmystium, L: Chris Black	3:30

Side D
No.	Title	Writer(s)	Length
1.	"Macrocosmic" (Guitar solos by Matt Johnsen and Ross Strahan)	M: Nachtmystium, L: Chris Black	4:19
2.	"Ruined Life Continuum"	M: Nachtmystium, L: Blake Judd and Chris B	4:41
3.	"Every Last Drop" (Clean vocals by Bruce Lamont)	M: Nachtmystium, L: Chris Black	8:30

== Production ==
- Produced by Chris Black and Nachtmystium
- Engineered and mixed by Sanford Parker
- Mastered by Collin Jordan at BR Mastering, Chicago, IL

== Personnel ==
=== Nachtmystium ===
- Blake Judd – Lead and rhythm guitars, vocals
- Jeff Wilson – Lead and rhythm guitars
- Will Lindsay – Bass, lead and rhythm guitars, backing vocals
- Sanford Parker – Synthesizers and effects
- Jef "Wrest" Whitehead – Drums and percussion

=== Additional Musicians ===
- Chris Black – keyboards, programming, guitars, backing vocals
- Bruce Lamont – clean vocals on "Every Last Drop"
- Russ Strahan – guitars on "Macrocosmic"
- Matt Johnsen – guitars on "Macrocosmic"
