= The World We Left Behind =

Studio album by Nachtmystium
- Released: August 2014
- Recorded: July – August 2013
- Studio: Belle City Sound, Racine, Wisconsin
- Genre: Atmospheric black metal
- Length: 54:40
- Label: Century Media Records

Nachtmystium chronology
Silencing Machine (2014)	The World We Left Behind (2014)	Retox: Remixes and Rarities (2017)

Professional ratings
Aggregate scores
Source	Rating
Metacritic	43/100
Review scores
Source	Rating
About.com	4/5 stars
AllMusic	2/5 stars
The Line of Best Fit	7.5/10 stars
Metal Storm	8.5/10
Pitchfork Media	3.9/10

The World We Left Behind is the seventh studio album by American psychedelic black metal band Nachtmystium, released in August 2014. Nachtmystium's vocalist and frontman, Blake Judd was struggling with a heroin addiction while working on the album. Judd's addiction drew public attention when he was arrested for misdemeanor theft charges, and later accused of defrauding multiple fans and business partners. Many of the album's songs include references to Judd's struggle with heroin and recovery. The album received a mixed reception.

== Track list ==
No.	Title	Length
1.	"Intrusion"	2:44
2.	"Fireheart"	5:15
3.	"Voyager"	7:20
4.	"Into the Endless Abyss"	8:27
5.	"In the Absence of Existence"	6:51
6.	"The World We Left Behind"	6:33
7.	"Tear You Down"	5:18
8.	"On the Other Side"	4:43
9.	"Epitaph for a Dying Star"	7:29

== Charts ==
Chart (2014)	Peak position
US Heatseekers Albums (Billboard)	32
