= Every Red Heart Shines Toward the Red Sun =

Studio album by Red Sparowes
- Released: September 19, 2006
- Recorded: April—May 2006
- Genres: Post-rock; Post-metal
- Length: 61:37
- Label: Neurot Recordings
- Producers: Red Sparowes, Tim Green

Red Sparowes chronology
At the Soundless Dawn (2005)	Every Red Heart Shines Toward the Red Sun (2006)	Oh Lord, God of Vengeance, Show Yourself! (2006)

Professional ratings
Review scores
Source	Rating
Allmusic	3.5/5 stars
Drowned in Sound	(9/10)
scenepointblank	(9/10)
Sonic Frontiers	(8.8/10)

Every Red Heart Shines Toward the Red Sun is the second studio album by post-rock band Red Sparowes, released in September 2006.

Despite having no lyrics, the album (by way of its song titles) follows the story of the Great Leap Forward in Mao Zedong-era China, more specifically recounting the Great Sparrow Campaign, a mass killing of sparrows (along with rats, flies and mosquitoes) that fed on a portion of the harvest and were seen as pests. Peasants were encouraged to bang pots and pans to scare sparrows into continuing flight, eventually killing them from exhaustion. Whilst the harvest of the year after the campaign was larger, there was a massive rise in locust numbers in the late 1950s, as a result of the significantly lower population of sparrows, a major predator of the locust.

== Track listing ==
No.	Title	Length
1.	"The Great Leap Forward Poured Down Upon Us One Day Like a Mighty Storm, Suddenly and Furiously Blinding Our Senses."	7:00
2.	"We Stood Transfixed in Blank Devotion as Our Leader Spoke to Us, Looking Down on Our Mute Faces with a Great, Raging, and Unseeing Eye."	8:55
3.	"Like the Howling Glory of the Darkest Winds, This Voice Was Thunderous and the Words Holy, Tangling Their Way Around Our Hearts and Clutching Our Innocent Awe."	10:08
4.	"A Message of Avarice Rained Down and Carried Us Away into False Dreams of Endless Riches."	7:11
5.	"'Annihilate the Sparrow, That Stealer of Seed, and Our Harvests Will Abound; We Will Watch Our Wealth Flood In.'"	8:43
6.	"And by Our Own Hand Did Every Last Bird Lie Silent in Their Puddles, the Air Barren of Song as the Clouds Drifted Away. For Killing Their Greatest Enemy, the Locusts Noisily Thanked Us and Turned Their Jaws Toward Our Crops, Swallowing Our Greed Whole."	1:42
7.	"Millions Starved and We Became Skinnier and Skinnier, While Our Leaders Became Fatter and Fatter."	9:55
8.	"Finally, as That Blazing Sun Shone Down Upon Us, Did We Know That True Enemy Was the Voice of Blind Idolatry; and Only Then Did We Begin to Think for Ourselves."	8:03

=== Bonus Tracks ===
Japanese Edition
No.	Title	Length
9.	"As the Black Wind Withers in the Sky, We Are Graced Dimly in Our Dreams. (Bonus Track)"	14:46

== Personnel ==
Red Sparowes

- Bryant Clifford Meyer – guitar, organ, piano
- Josh Graham – guitar, keyboard
- Andy Arahood – guitar
- Greg Burns – bass guitar, pedal steel
- David Clifford – drums

Additional

- Tim Green – audio engineering, audio mixing and production
- John Golden – mastering
- Josh Graham, Julie Christmas – story
