= Aurora Borealis (band) =

American black metal band

- Origin: Waldorf, Maryland, United States
- Genres: Blackened death metal
- Years active: 1994–present
- Labels: Die Hard Music, Xtreem Music, Nightsky Productions, Hammerheart Records
- Members: Ron Vento; Mark Green; Eddie Rossi
- Past members: Tony Laureano; Tim Yeung; Derek Roddy; Jason Ian-Vaughn Eckert
- Website: Auroraborealis.org

Aurora Borealis is an American black metal band from Waldorf, Maryland. The band was founded by guitarist Ron Vento and drummer Tony Laureano in 1994. In 1996 they released their first EP, Mansions of Eternity. In 2013, the band signed with Xtreem Music.

== Current members ==
- Ron Vento - guitars, vocals, bass, keyboards
- Mark Green - drums and percussion
- Eddie Rossi - bass

== Discography ==
- Mansions of Eternity (EP, 1996)
- Praise the Archaic Lights Embrace (CD, 1998)
- Northern Lights (CD, 2000)
- Time Unveiled (CD, 2002)
- Relinquish (CD, 2006)
- Timeline: The Beginning and End of Everything (CD, 2011)
- Worldshapers (CD, 2014)
- Apokalupsis (CD, 2018)
- Prophecy Is the Mold in Which History Is Poured (CD, 2022)
