= And We Wept the Black Ocean Within =

Studio album by A Storm of Light
- Released: 10 June 2008
- Genre: Post-metal
- Length: 62:50
- Label: Neurot Recordings
- Producer: Josh Graham

A Storm of Light chronology
| And We Wept the Black Ocean Within (2008) | Forgive Us Our Trespasses (2009) |

Professional ratings
Review scores
| Source | Rating |
|---|---|
| AbsolutePunk | 71% |

And We Wept the Black Ocean Within is the first studio album by American post-metal band A Storm of Light.

== Track listing ==
| No. | Title | Length |
|---|---|---|
| 1. | "Adrift (The Albatross I)" | 1:47 |
| 2. | "Vast and Endless" | 7:26 |
| 3. | "Black Ocean" | 9:10 |
| 4. | "Thunderhead" | 7:53 |
| 5. | "Undertow (The Albatross II)" | 3:15 |
| 6. | "Mass" | 8:04 |
| 7. | "Leaden Tide" | 7:49 |
| 8. | "Breach (The Albatross III)" | 2:06 |
| 9. | "Descent" | 5:00 |
| 10. | "Iron Heart" | 10:20 |
