= Worldfall =

EP by Nachtmystium
- Released: April 5, 2008
- Genre: Black metal
- Label: Century Media

Nachtmystium chronology
Instinct: Decay (2006)	Worldfall (2008)	Assassins: Black Meddle, Part I (2008)

Worldfall is an EP by the Illinois black metal band Nachtmystium. It was released April 5, 2008 via Century Media Records.

It contains the songs that would have made up the Nachtmystium side of the Nachtmystium/Leviathan split album, which has been delayed due to legal issues with Leviathan's record label. Blabbermouth rated it eight out of ten and described it as "surprisingly gripping."

== Track listing ==
1. Worldfall
2. Depravity
3. Solitary Voyage
4. Rose Clouds of Holocaust (Death in June cover)
5. IV (Goatsnake cover)

== Personnel ==
=== Additional personnel ===
- Christophe Szpajdel — logo
