= Oh Lord, God of Vengeance, Show Yourself! =

Live album by Red Sparowes
- Released: 2006
- Recorded: 2006
- Genre: Post-rock; Post-metal
- Length: 70:53
- Label: Neurot Recordings

Red Sparowes chronology
| Every Red Heart Shines Toward the Red Sun (2006) | Oh Lord, God of Vengeance, Show Yourself! (2006) | Aphorisms (2008) |

Oh Lord, God of Vengeance, Show Yourself! is a live album released by Red Sparowes in 2006 with the purpose of allowing the band to replace equipment which was stolen from their van while touring in Europe.

The album title and liner notes make the feelings of the band very clear:

Let this curse find those who have stolen from us like the wolf finds his prey.

May death come to you on swift wings, may your spoils turn into serpents and coil around your necks, may the rest of your days be stricken with unending sickness, may your children's bodies belong to the fire, may every last one of you anguish in eternal pain, crying aloud for mercy, while we turn our heads away with a smile and a deaf ear.

In payment for your treachery, we will accept your thieving hands on our finest plates, your sullen heads on our tallest flag poles, and your worthless souls in our enveloping clutches. All the while we will watch your graveless corpses writhe with worms and turn into an eternal, restless dust.

Always know, we shall forever be against you as a crocodile on the water, as a serpent on the earth, as a raven in the wind, and as an enemy in this world and worlds to come.

== Track listing ==
1. "The Great Leap Forward Poured Down Upon Us One Day Like a Mighty Storm Suddenly and Furiously Blinding Our Senses" - 8:34
2. "Alone and Unaware, the Landscape was Transformed in Front of Our Eyes" - 8:00
3. "Like the Howling Glory of the Darkest Winds, this Voice was Thunderous and the Words Holy" - 10:48
4. "Buildings Began to Stretch Wide Across the Sky, and the Air Filled with a Reddish Glow" - 7:17
5. "Our Happiest Days Slowly Began to Turn Into Dust" - 7:21
6. "Finally as That Blazing Sun Shone Down Upon Us Did We Know That True Enemy Was the Voice of Blind Idolatry; and Only Then Did We Begin to Think for Ourselves" - 14:14
7. "The Sixth Extinction Crept Up Slowly, Like the Sunlight Through the Shutters" - 14:39
