= Salome (Marriages album) =

Studio album by Marriages
- Released: April 7, 2015
- Recorded: February 2014
- Studio: The Hobby Shop, Highland Park, Los Angeles
- Genre: Alternative rock, post rock, experimental rock
- Length: 42:57
- Label: Sargent House

Marriages chronology
Kitsune EP (2012)	Salome (2015)

Professional ratings
Aggregate scores
Source	Rating
Metacritic	76/100
Review scores
Source	Rating
AllMusic	3/5 stars
Drowned in Sound	8 out of 10
Sputnikmusic	3.6 "great"

Salome is the only studio album from American rock band Marriages. The record was released on April 7, 2015, by Sargent House. The album was named after Salome, a mythical character from The Bible. It was recorded in February 2014 at The Hobby Shop, Highland Park, Los Angeles, and the group's first release to feature drummer Andrew Clinco. Fred Sablan (Marilyn Manson, Queen Kwong) also appeared as a guest musician on the record. Upon release, the album received "generally favorable reviews" from music critics.

== Track listing ==
All tracks are written by Emma Ruth Rundle, Greg Burns and Andrew Clinco.

No.	Title	Length
1.	"The Liar"	4:58
2.	"Skin"	4:23
3.	"Santa Sangre"	3:26
4.	"Southern Eye"	4:49
5.	"Binge"	4:38
6.	"Salome"	6:04
7.	"Less Than"	5:24
8.	"Love, Texas"	4:45
9.	"Contender"	4:30
Total length:		42:57

Amazon.com, iTunes digital download bonus tracks
No.	Title	Length
10.	"Under Will"	3:47
11.	"Haze of Slate"	5:12
Total length:		51:56

== Personnel ==
Salome album personnel adapted from AllMusic.

- Emma Ruth Rundle – guitar, vocals
- Greg Burns – bass, keyboards
- Andrew Clinco – drums, percussion, guitar
- Fred Sablan – guitar
- Tom Biller – engineer
- Jeff Bond – mixing
- Heba Kadry – mastering
- Sonny Kay – layout
