= Scion Audio/Visual =

- Founder: Scion, Toyota
- Defunct: August 15, 2016
- Genre: Hip hop, rock, electronic, reggae
- Country of origin: United States
- Location: Los Angeles, California
- Official website: scionav.com

Scion Audio/Visual, also known as Scion AV, Scion A/V or SA/V, was an in-house record label and "lifestyle marketing" division of the Scion marque produced by Toyota Motor Corporation for the North American market.

Along with the rest of the Scion brand, Scion A/V was absorbed into Toyota in August 2016.

== Marketing ==
Scion Audio/Visual sought to market the Scion automotive brand to younger customers by promoting various music, art, and film projects. From 2003, Scion paid for dozens of artists to make recordings and videos that were distributed digitally through the Scion AV website, and they also put on hundreds of music and art events around the United States. Scion did not make a profit from Scion AV projects, and the artists involved retained all ownership of the creative content. Scion covered all production, licensing and distribution costs for the projects with any proceeds going directly back to the artist.

== Music ==
Scion AV produced records, music videos, and events in several genres of music including metal, dance, hip hop, and garage rock. As of February 6, 2013, Scion AV had released 143 records that include EP's, full-length albums, and singles. They worked with over 1,500 artists, including ASAP Rocky, Chromeo, Justice, Pro Era, Dâm-Funk, Melvins, A-Trak, Meshuggah, Immolation, Danny Brown, Harry Fraud, Red Fang, Revocation, and the Black Lips.

Scion AV Streaming Radio (formerly Scion Radio 17) was a collection of 17 internet radio channels that streamed from the company's website, iTunes, Live365, and various mobile apps. Each channel was updated monthly and featured three hours of music on a loop that streamed 24 hours a day. Notable DJs and musicians, such as 45 King, Roy Davis Jr., and Rob Swift, hosted each channel and curated the musical content.

Beginning in 2009, Scion AV produced an annual heavy metal music festival called Scion Rock Fest that took place in different U.S. cities each year. Festival locations included Atlanta, Columbus, Pomona, and Tampa. Scion AV also formerly produced a garage rock festival called Scion Garage Fest that occurred in 2009 in Portland, OR and 2010 in Lawrence, KS.

Scion AV also produced an annual conference in Los Angeles called the Scion Music(less) Music Conference with panels that discussed issues facing the music industry.

== Film ==
Scion AV produced several films and web series. Notable film projects include a garage rock documentary produced in 2010 in collaboration with Vice titled New Garage Explosion: In Love With These Times and an eight-part web series released in December 2012 titled Young Americans directed by Lance Bangs. Past projects also include the Scion Route project, which gathered 10 independent filmmakers to produce short films screened in Los Angeles in November 2007, and the Scion Easy 10 project—another curation of 10 short films screened in New York and Los Angeles in January and February 2009.
