= Tony Laureano =

American drummer

- Born: January 25, 1973 (age 52); San Juan, Puerto Rico
- Genres: Death metal, black metal, extreme metal, heavy metal, thrash metal, speed metal
- Occupation: Drummer

Tony Laureano (born January 25, 1973) is an American musician and heavy metal drummer. He has played for a number of metal bands (either as a full band member or a session drummer) including Dimmu Borgir, Nile, Angelcorpse, Malevolent Creation, God Dethroned, Acheron, Aurora Borealis, Belphegor, Nachtmystium, 1349, and Brujeria.

He was the touring drummer for Dimmu Borgir during their performances at Ozzfest 2004, and Wacken Open Air in 2007 (a recording of the Ozzfest show was included with the 2005 reissue of Stormblåst). Laureano also took the place of 1349 drummer Frost on the Enslaved tour during September 2006 in the UK, as Frost was busy writing material with Satyricon. In June 2007, he returned to Dimmu Borgir stepping in for Hellhammer, who was recovering from a neck injury. He was later replaced by ex-Vader drummer Daray in late August, who became Dimmu Borgir's new drummer for their next album. Tony toured in the summer of 2009 with All That Remains, after drummer Jason Costa suffered a broken hand during the week of June 21. Laureano later toured with 1349 on several dates of Cannibal Corpse's "Evisceration Plague" tour, on account of drummer Frost being detained by US customs due to problems with his visa.

On October 8, 2015, Metalsucks.net reported that Laureano had been playing with Megadeth while they were on tour in Asia. Frontman Dave Mustaine confirmed in a February 17, 2016, interview with Ticketmaster Insider that Laureano would be filling in for Chris Adler on nights that his schedule wouldn't permit him to play.

In 2020, Laureano was announced to be the touring drummer for Norwegian black metal band Mayhem on their "Decibel Magazine Tour" filling-in for Hellhammer who could not perform due to shoulder injury. The tour was ultimately cancelled due to the COVID-19 pandemic.

== Discography ==
- Astaroth, Lost State of Dreams (1993)
- Naphobia, Of Hell (1995)
- Aurora Borealis, Mansions of Eternity (1996)
- Acheron, Those Who Have Risen (1998)
- Angelcorpse, The Inexorable (1999)
- God Dethroned, Ravenous (2001)
- Internecine, Book of Lambs (2002)
- Nile, In Their Darkened Shrines (2002)
- Malevolent Creation, Conquering South America (2004)
- Aurora Borealis, Relinquish (2005)
- Dimmu Borgir, Stormblåst MMV (2005-DVD), The Invaluable Darkness (2008-DVD)
- Nachtmystium, Assassins: Black Meddle, Part 1 (2008)
- Insidious Disease, Shadowcast (2010)
