= Nations to Flames =

Studio album by A Storm of Light
- Released: 17 September 2013
- Studio: Fahrenheit Studios, Johnson City, Tennessee
- Genre: Doom metal, industrial metal
- Length: 51:35
- Label: Southern Lord
- Producer: Josh Graham

A Storm of Light chronology
As the Valley of Death Becomes Us, Our Silver Memories Fade (2011)	Nations to Flames (2013)

Nations to Flames is the fourth studio album by American post-metal band A Storm of Light. It was released by Southern Lord on 17 September 2013. The album has been noted for its shift from the post-rock of its predecessor towards a sound that more prominently highlights the band's industrial and doom influences.

== Style ==
Nations to Flames has been described as amongst the most aggressive and fast-paced albums in A Storm of Light's discography. Guitarist and vocalist Josh Graham acknowledged that this has been part of a larger shift for the band:

Over the course of the bands lifetime, we've slowly been pushing into this direction. We all love slow and pummeling music, but we just needed to change things up and expand our sound. Each record has been a bit faster than the one before. That said, when we played with Slayer at ATP last year that kind of refreshed my personal interest in faster music. We watched most of the soundcheck (until we were booted out of the room) and we were all energized. For a long time I felt that slower music had more punishing power but I'm not sure that is always the case. This record is definitely much darker and heavier than anything we've done.

Graham's approach to vocals on Nations to Flames drew comparisons to Killing Joke's Jaz Coleman and departed from the clean singing characteristic of his past approach. Graham confirmed that his approach was developed when the band played songs off of Nations to Flames during its tour with Converge prior to entering the recording studio. During that tour, Graham said that he "realized that what we needed was more aggression and somewhat more atonal vocals," which he described as "more akin to Motörhead than Killing Joke".

== Concept ==
The concept underlying the album is, according to Graham, a tale of "one possible future of human failure [involving] the collapse of society due to overpopulation and pollution". He further detailed the concept as a story humanity "realiz[ing] too late that the importance of their government, their nationalism, and their religions meant nothing in relation to the damage we are inflicting on our planet." The concept extends to the album cover art, which portrays what Graham describes as "a small surviving group of revolutionaries [who] are biding time until their own demise. The body and the flag represent humanity, and are being ironically sacrificed to the earth...more fire, more smoke, more pollution. They know now that their revolution/realization happened too late, and that the earth will soon be on its own."

Further to the concept, the CD insert references Margaret Atwood's 2009 short fiction, "Time Capsule Found On the Dead Planet", as suggested reading. This piece was written by Atwood as part of the 10:10 global warming mitigation campaign.

== Reception ==
Professional ratings
Review scores
Source	Rating
About.com	4.5/5 stars
Blabbermouth	8.5/10
Exclaim!	8/10
Popmatters	6/10

Nations to Flames generally received favourable reviews, with most critics commenting upon the stylistic departure from the band's previous album. Ray Van Horn Jr. wrote for Blabbermouth that the album was "reflective more of industrial and splatterpunk", yet the album "is still joined at the hip by those core values of punched-up doom and explorative embellishments". Natalie Zina Walschots praised the album in Exclaim! as the band's "best release to date", and also suggested that "the melancholic and atmospheric" post-rock elements had been "burned away by the mechanical heat of industrial and crushed by the relentless weight of doom". Describing the album as "the soundtrack to our damnation", Matt Hinch described the album for About.com as a "lush, fulfilling and diverse affair". However, David Maine was more critical of the album in Popmatters, suggesting that "listener fatigue" diminishes the album concept, with "any kind of considered commentary on the society in which we live is lost amid the layers of distortion and double-kick drumming".

== Track listing ==
No.	Title	Length
1.	"Fall"	4:44
2.	"Apostles of Hatred"	5:20
3.	"The Fire Sermon"	4:28
4.	"Omen"	3:59
5.	"Dead Flags"	5:14
6.	"All the Shining Lies"	5:49
7.	"Disintegrate"	4:49
8.	"Lifeless"	4:55
9.	"Soothsayer"	1:54
10.	"You Are the Hunted"	4:36
11.	"The Year Is One"	5:47

== Personnel ==
=== Band ===
- Domenic Seita - bass, backing vocals
- Billy Graves - drums, percussion
- Josh Graham - guitar, keyboards, vocals

=== Guest Musicians ===
- Kim Thayil - guitar on "The Fire Sermon", "Omen", and "The Year Is One"
- Will Lindsay - guitar on "Apostles of Hatred", "Omen", "Lifeless", "Disintegrate", and "Soothsayer"

=== Production ===
- Travis Kammeyer - recording
- Matt Bayles - mixing
- Brad Boatright - mastering
- Josh Graham and A Storm of Light - production

=== Art ===
- Niko Tavernise - photography
- Josh Graham - - photography
- Josh Graham - layout and design
