= Nachtmystium =

American psychedelic black metal band

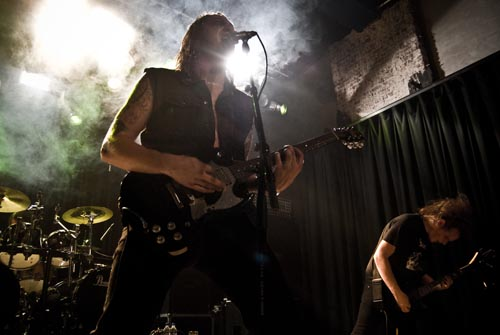
- Live at Hole in the Sky, Bergen Metal Fest 2008

Background information
- Origin: Wheaton, Illinois, U.S.
- Genres: Psychedelic black metal, black 'n' roll
- Years active: 2000–2014; 2017–2020; 2024
- Labels: Prophecy, Earache, Century Media, Candlelight, Battle Kommand, Southern Lord, Ascension Monuments
- Members: Blake Judd
- Past members: Chris Black; Jeff Wilson; Sanford Parker; Neill Jameson; Andrew Markuszewski; Will Lindsay; Reid Raley; Martin von Falkenstein; Øystein Albrektsson; Jacob Dye; Job "Phenex" Bos; Jean-Michel Graffio

Nachtmystium is an American psychedelic black metal band formed by Blake Judd, formerly known as Azentrius, and Pat McCormick. The band's name derives from the German word Nacht meaning "night", and the faux Latinism mystium, which resembles mysticum. Judd and McCormick combined the words to mean "Encompassing Darkness". Nachtmystium released multiple albums between 2005 and 2012, including Instinct: Decay (2006), Assassins: Black Meddle, Part I (2008), and Silencing Machine (2012).

Controversy marred the band's success in 2013 when Judd was arrested for theft charges and admitted he had a drug problem. Nachtmystium went on a four-year hiatus until 2017, when Judd reformed the band to record new studio material and perform at four concerts. Judd disbanded Nachtmystium in 2020, but temporarily restarted the project in 2024 to release a new album.

== History ==
Blake Judd and Pat McCormick founded Nachtmystium as a side project. The band was influenced by second-wave black metal bands, such as Darkthrone and Burzum, evidenced in their low-fi first release Reign of the Malicious in 2002. Judd described the band's next release, Demise (2004), as Nachtmystium's "last straight forward 'raw black metal' record." The band's following two releases, Eulogy IV (2004) and Instinct: Decay (2006), incorporated psychedelic and experimental elements pioneered by bands like Black Sabbath, The Doors and Pink Floyd. Instinct: Decay received general positive feedback from critics. DEAF SPARROW Zine praised the album for its innovation, while Decibel Magazine named Instinct: Decay the fourth best album of 2006. The band released Assassins: Black Meddle, Part I on June 10, 2008, in America. The album received a generally positive critical reception, especially from Pitchfork Media and MTV's Headbangers Ball; both stated that it was one of the year's best releases.

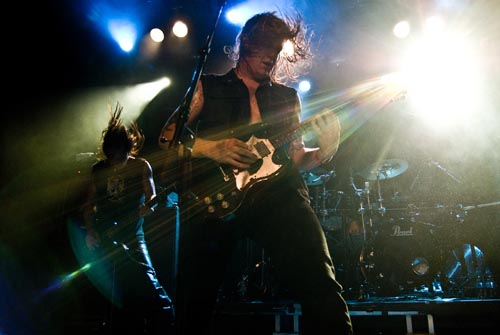
Live at Hole in the Sky, 2008

Assassins' success increased the band's popularity. Nachtmystium played their first Scandinavian show in Bergen, Norway at the 2008 Hole in the Sky festival with At the Gates, Municipal Waste, and Meshuggah. Nachtmystium toured with Opeth, Baroness, and High on Fire for the first half of their American tour. In 2009, the band released a remastered version of Demise, with two extra tracks, and also released the EP Doomsday Derelicts. The band experienced setbacks in February and March 2009. Nachtmystium withdrew from the Scion Rock Fest in Atlanta, Georgia due to alleged connections to National Socialist black metal (see Connection to NSBM section). Later that month, Judd injured his leg, forcing the band to cancel their tour with The Haunted.

In September 2009, Nachtmystium announced plans to release Addicts: Black Meddle, Part II, the follow-up to Assassins: Black Meddle, Part I. Judd commented that the album would feature new material with "more of a rock and roll edge over all", and reflect the bands interest in post-rock and industrial music. The album debuted on June 8, 2010. The band played at the Inferno Festival in Oslo, Norway on April 3, 2010, where they shared the stage with Mayhem, Finntroll, and Taake. Nachtmystium toured the United States with Cradle of Filth and Turisas in early 2011.

Nachtmystium began recording their next album in early 2011. The departure of band mate Jeff Wilson for personal reasons impeded the album's progress. In 2012, Nachtmystium released their sixth full-length studio album, Silencing Machine. The album was a departure from the two Black Meddle albums. Judd described the album as "a follow-up to Instinct: Decay". He stated that the album had "still some psychedelic vibes here and there, but overall it's much more on par towards our older material". Silencing Machine was positively received by critics, including Sputnikmusic, AllMusic, and Popmatters. Pitchfork Media stated, "Silencing Machine is an impressive and stylish reinvention of an earlier form by a band that could've easily lost the plot, but instead reigned in the excess, and wrote us a new one."

The band resumed production on a new studio album during the summer of 2013. Judd was arrested on October 5, 2013, on misdemeanor theft charges. The incident publicly exposed Judd's heroin addiction and forced him to seek rehabilitation. Nachtmystium canceled their remaining concerts while Judd focused on completing the band's next album, The World We Left Behind. After finalizing the album, Judd announced Nachtmystium was disbanding after 13 years on November 13. The World We Left Behind was released on August 5, 2014. The album garnered mixed critical reception. The album's song structure and lyrics polarized critics. The Line of Best Fit praised The World We Left Behind, stating, "[Nachtmystium] have returned to their best style — tempered, refined heavy rock that uses the finest extracts of black metal to supplement an already engrossing sound." Pitchfork Media cited flaws such as "the absence of transition and sequence, the lack of focus and coherence, the presence of awful lyrics and middling riffs". The Quietus stated, "it is predominately dull and uninspired. It is a truly forgettable album written during a time that its creator would clearly like to forget."

In late August, fans complained that they failed to receive copies of The World We Left Behind that they purchased directly from Judd. Prior to his 2013 arrest, fans accused Judd of failing to fulfill purchase agreements without issuing refunds. Judd stated that he had run out of copies for distribution and was waiting for Century Media to deliver more copies to him. As more customers questioned the status of their orders, Judd and Nachtmystium's Facebook storefronts were shutdown without any explanation. On September 5, Century Media issued an official statement about the situation and asked fans to contact them directly about unfulfilled orders from Judd. The label announced that they would no longer release or distribute Nachtmystium albums. Deadlight Entertainment, a French label that was producing and distributing band merchandise and albums, cut ties with Nachtmystium in the wake of Judd's questionable business practices and controversy.

Judd admitted to selling merchandise to customers without intending to fulfill their orders. He claimed to have spent the money on heroin until his scam exposed. In January 2016, Judd apologized to fans and revealed he was no-longer involved with the music industry. In April, Judd posted a compilation of previously unreleased Nachtmystium recordings and remixes on YouTube. On November 1, Judd announced that Earache Records had acquired the rights to redistribute Nachtmystium's five studio albums, as well as the new compilation album Retox: Remixes and Rarities, which contains several remixes and covers that Judd previously released on YouTube. Judd announced he would work with Earache Records to resolve unfulfilled merchandise. He released the following statement: "Thank you all for your patience and I do hope to make things right with everyone I can who fell victim to my addiction issues by not receiving orders for music or merchandise. I intend on giving away every single record and CD I receive of these reissues, if that's what it takes, to make things right with the fans whom I wronged and did not fulfill orders for."

In March 2017, Judd reformed Nachtmystium to play four live shows and record the EP Resilient. The band performed at the "Festum Carnis Open Air Festival" in Wilseyville, California on July 7, and the Louisville Death Fest in Louisville, Kentucky on September 29. While at Festum Carnis, Judd issued refunds to fans he defrauded and offered to reimburse their concert admission fee. Judd announced on September 11 that Nachtmystium had signed with Prophecy Productions to distribute Resilient, released in November 2018.

Nachtmystium began working on the third Black Meddle installment in early 2020. Judd disbanded Nachtmystium on June 14, 2020. He released a statement on the band's official Facebook page explaining his desire to move onto other musical projects and professional endeavors. Despite breaking up the band, Judd collaborated with Andrew Markuszewski (lyrics), Ken Sorceron (bass), and Francesco Miatto (drums) on the album in 2022.

The band completed Blight Privilege in 2024. On August 6, Nachtmystium officially released their first single since 2018, "Phoenix Predator". Blight Privilege was released on November 1. Judd stated Nachtmystium was no longer active and the album was a "recording endeavor" to fulfill a commitment with Prophecy Productions. He commented the recording session produced "another full albums worth of new material", which would be released in the future.

Nachtmystium played at the Milwaukee Metal Fest on June 6, 2026, where they performed Instinct: Decay to commemorate its 20th anniversary.

== Musical style ==
Nachtmystium's line-up has frequently changed since its formation. Furthermore, while the band originally started as a black metal band, and even toured with black metal acts such as Angelcorpse, Goatwhore and Watain, Judd has frequently stated that the band should not be considered black metal per se. In an interview with DEAF SPARROW Zine, Judd stated, "What separates us from your average black metal band is that we're NOT a black metal band, we're a 'do-whatever-the-fuck-we-want' metal band and black metal happens to be what we build our foundation off of (in the case of Instinct: Decay and its predecessors), if you must categorize the rhythm sections of our music (rhythm guitars, bass and drums — the core of any album)." J. Bennet of Decibel Magazine described the band's sound as "Blackadelia". Jason Bracelin, of the Las Vegas Review-Journal, compared the band's latter work to Pink Floyd, claiming, "[Assassins] is what happens when Pink goes black." Since the release of Assassins, the band has received additional press-coverage and attention from media outlets, including Metal Maniacs, Terrorizer, CMJ New Music Monthly, and Metalkult.com. Despite their departure from the black metal genre, Carlos Ramirez of IGN.com listed Assassins as one of the ten greatest black metal albums.

Judd recruited Chris Black to produce Nachtmystium's later albums and compose lyrics. Black's themes and lyrics from Addicts: Black Meddle, Part II were inspired by Judd's heroin addiction. Judd assumed songwriting duties for Nachtmystium's final studio album, The World We Left Behind, and included many lyrics about his personal struggles with addiction. The band began writing Blight Privilege in 2020, which reflected on society's response to the COVID-19 pandemic and George Floyd protests. Judd also incorporated his rehabilitation from his opioid addiction and his father’s battle with late-stage brain cancer into the album's lyrics. He commented on his inspiration stating, "My best work is the biproduct [sic] of my personal suffering. If I'm not suffering, there is no music to make."

== Connection to NSBM ==
Nachtmystium's second demo, entitled Unholy Terrorist Cult, was unofficially re-released by Vinland Winds, an American National Socialist black metal (NSBM) record label, in 2001. Vinland Winds made CD-Rs without the band's knowledge and designed their own layout for the CD-Rs that were distributed with different cover art. In 2002, their first full-length album, Reign of the Malicious, was released on Regimental Records and then distributed by Unholy Records, who were an imprint of the white power skinhead label Resistance Records, and dealt mostly with National Socialist black metal bands. Judd claims that upon learning of the arrangement, he did not want Nachtmystium to become associated with a NSBM label, and demanded Resistance Records stop selling the band's albums.

In 2005, Metalreviews.com interviewed Judd to discuss Nachtmystium's recent work and background. During the interview, Judd dismissed MTV and the mainstream media as "Zionist means of demoralizing young American's [sic] artistic standards." He initially claimed the statement was taken out of context, but later remorsefully acknowledged and renounced his comment.

In 2006, Judd said, "In the past, we've had some indirect ties to labels and bands that are part of the NS scene. At one point not too many years ago, it wasn't uncommon for NS labels or bands to trade and work with non-politically motivated bands and labels because at the end of the day, we're all trying to promote, release, and be involved with music—all politics aside. Today it seems like there's less of a connection, at least for me and my label. We don't oppose people's right to be 'NS' or whatever—that's a personal choice, and if you live in the USA, you have the right to that opinion. Even though I personally, my band(s) and my label have absolutely no interest in being a part of that scene, I will ALWAYS take their side when it comes to their freedom of speech being imposed upon."

Just before the Atlanta, Georgia Scion Rock Fest on Saturday February 28, 2009, Nachtmystium was forced to cancel at the request of the festival's promoters, and sponsors, Toyota, on Tuesday February 23, 2008, due to an unnamed source, who believed the group was a "Nazi" band. Judd promptly released a statement after the incident, stating, "We will be taking legal action against the people who slandered us in this situation, and in the future will file defamation / slander charges against any person or organization who attempts to prevent us from performing anywhere, especially in the United States. So – let it be known loud and clear for the LAST TIME, we ARE NOT a Nazi band, ARE NOT political, are certainly NOT racists and DO NOT support that world or any band, person or business affiliated with it." He also apologized to Nachtmystium fans who traveled to the concert to support the band.

== Members ==
Current members

- Blake Judd – lead vocals, guitars (2000–2014, 2017–2020, 2024)

Live members

- Pat Clancy – guitars
- Markus Launsburry – bass guitar (2006), drums (2009)
- Jon Woodring – bass guitar, vocals (2008–2009)
- Zack Simmons – drums (2008–2009)
- Sanford Parker – keyboards (2008–2011)
- Andrew Markuszewski – bass guitar (2009–2011)
- Charlie Fell – drums (2009–2011)
- Bob Fouts – drums (2009)
- Timothy "Scarecrow" Preciado – guitars (2013)
- Øystein Albrektsson – bass, backing vocals (2017)
- Jacob Dye – guitars (2017–2020)
- Pete Truax – bass (2017–2020)

Session musicians

- Tony Laureano – drums (2008)
- Jef Stuart "Wrest" Whitehead – drums (2010)
- Charlie Fell – drums (2011–2012)
- Scare Crow – guitars (2013)
- Dustin Drenk – keyboards (2013)

Former members

- Zion Meagher – bass guitar (2000–2001)
- Pat "Noctis" McCormick – drums (2000–2002)
- Peter "Zmij" Kenar – vocals (2000–2001)
- Marcus Matthew Kolar – bass guitar (2001–2002)
- Kriglord – guitars, keyboards, vocals (2001–2002)
- Matt "Xaphar" Block – drums (2002–2003)
- David "Grave" Swanson – drums (2002)
- Andrew Markuszewski – guitars, vocals (2002–2003, 2011–2013)
- Mike Legros – guitars (2003–2004)
- Wargoat Obscurum – drums (2003–2006)
- Neill "N. Imperial" Jameson – bass guitar (2005)
- Chris Black – bass guitar, keyboards (2005–2012)
- Sinic – guitars (2006)
- Jeff Wilson – guitars (2006–2010)
- Sanford Parker – keyboards (2008–2013)
- Pat Clancy – bass guitar, guitars (2010)
- Reid Raley – bass guitar (2011–2012)
- Will Lindsay – bass guitar (2012)
- John Porada – bass guitar (2012–2013)
- Sam Shroyer – drums (2013)
- Jean-Michel Graffio – drums (2017–2018)
- Martin von Falkenstein – bass, backing vocals (2017–2020)
- Phenex – keyboards (2017–2018)
- Nolan Jenkins – drums (2018–2020)

== Discography ==
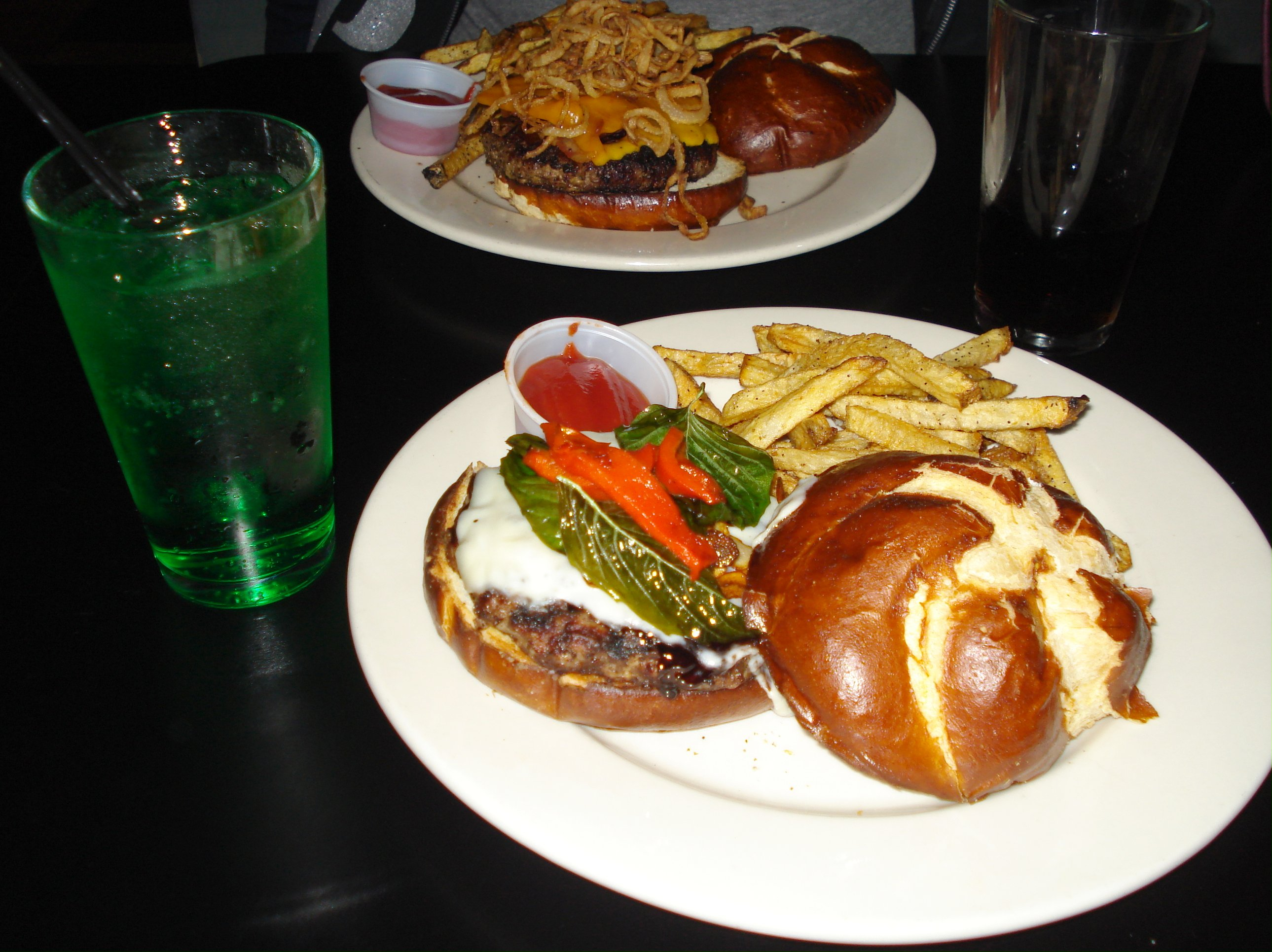
Kuma's Corner, a heavy metal-themed restaurant in Chicago, named their May 2008 special after Nachtmystium.

=== Full-length albums ===
- Reign of the Malicious (2002)
- Demise (2004)
- Instinct: Decay (2006)
- Assassins: Black Meddle, Part I (2008)
- Addicts: Black Meddle, Part II (2010)
- Silencing Machine (2012)
- The World We Left Behind (2014)
- Blight Privilege (2024)

=== EP releases ===
- Nachtmystium (2003); re-released together with Reign of the Malicious (2004)
- Eulogy IV (2004)
- Worldfall (2008)
- Doomsday Derelicts (2009)
- Resilient (2018)

=== Demos ===
- Holocaust of Eternity (2000)
- Unholy Terrorist Cult (2001)

=== Split albums ===
- Nachtmystium/Zalnik (with Zalnik) (2001)
- Nachtmystium/Xasthur (with Xasthur) (2004)
- Daze West (with Krieg) (2005)
- Nachtmystium/Murmur (2011)

=== Live releases ===
- Live Onslaught (2002)
- Live Blitzkrieg (2003)
- Live Onslaught 2 (2005)
- Visual Propaganda: Live from the Pits of Damnation (DVD, 2005)
- Live at Roadburn MMX (LP and CD 2011)

=== Compilation albums ===
- The First Attacks, 2000–2001 (2004)
- Retox: Remixes and Rarities (2017)
