= Instinct: Decay =

Studio album by Nachtmystium
- Released: May 30, 2006
- Recorded: June – November 2005 at 129103 Studio
- Genres: Black metal, psychedelic rock
- Length: 42:55
- Labels: Battle Kommand, Southern Lord
- Producers: Chris Black, Azentrius

Nachtmystium chronology
Demise (2004)	Instinct: Decay (2006)	Worldfall (2008)

Professional ratings
Review scores
Source	Rating
Allmusic	4/5 stars

Instinct: Decay is the third full-length album by Nachtmystium. It was rated the 4th best album of the year by Decibel Magazine. The album was released on CD by Battle Kommand Records and on Vinyl by Profound Lore Records and Autopsy Kitchen Records.

According to Blake Judd, the album is a metaphor for his views on society's decline. In an interview with DEAF SPARROW Zine, Judd stated the album's themes revolve around his idea humans have a natural inclination to harm themselves through "personal greed, lust, and power". Judd considers these vices to be the cause of society's ills, including war, indifference, and one's own self-destruction.

The album's cover art was designed by Rebecca Clegg.

In 2013, Decibel ranked Instinct: Decay at number 52 on its list of the Top 100 Black Metal Albums of All Time.

== Track listing ==
All lyrics are written by Lord Imperial & Azentrius (Blake Judd); all music is composed by Azentrius.

No.	Title	Length
1.	"Instinct"	1:32
2.	"A Seed for Suffering"	7:09
3.	"Keep Them Open"	2:56
4.	"Chosen by No One"	7:01
5.	"Circumvention"	4:13
6.	"Eternal Ground"	3:26
7.	"The Antichrist Messiah"	2:30
8.	"Here's to Hoping"	4:03
9.	"Abstract Nihilism"	3:39
10.	"Decay"	6:26

== Production ==
- Produced By Azentrius & Chris Black
- Recorded, Engineered & Mixed By Chris Black
- Mastered By Scott Hull

== Personnel ==
- Azentrius - lead & rhythm guitar, vocals
- Sinic - rhythm guitar
- Lord Imperial - bass
- Wargoat Obscurum - drums
- Chris Black - additional lead guitar
- Marcus Launsberry - additional rhythm guitar
