= Demise (Nachtmystium album) =

Studio album by Nachtmystium
- Released: February 2004
- Recorded: August 17–18, 2003 at Studio 1025
- Genre: Black metal
- Length: 43:03
- Label: Battle Kommand Records; Autopsy Kitchen Records

Nachtmystium chronology
Reign of the Malicious (2002)	Demise (2004)	Instinct: Decay (2006)

Demise is the second full-length album by Nachtmystium. It is their final album to feature a straightforward black metal sound.

== Track listing ==
All tracks are written by Azentrius & Aamonael, except where noted.

No.	Title	Writer(s)	Length
1.	"Intro"	Luedke	1:34
2.	"Solitary Voyage"		7:01
3.	"Scorpio Incarnate"		5:00
4.	"Ashes to Ashes"		6:06
5.	"The Glorious Moment"		5:11
6.	"Rise and Fall"		9:49
7.	"Transmission Postmortem (Outro)" (performed by Azentrius, S.M.T. & A.R.)		8:23

== Personnel ==
=== Additional personnel ===
- Christophe Szpajdel — logo
