= At the Soundless Dawn =

Studio album by Red Sparowes
- Released: February 22, 2005
- Recorded: 2004
- Genre: Post-rock, post-metal
- Length: 62:38
- Label: Neurot, Robotic Empire, Hypertension
- Producer: Red Sparowes

Red Sparowes chronology
At the Soundless Dawn (2005)	Every Red Heart Shines Toward the Red Sun (2006)

Professional ratings
Review scores
Source	Rating
Allmusic	4/5 stars
Pitchfork Media	(5.9/10)

At the Soundless Dawn (2005) is the debut release for the American musical group Red Sparowes. It had a mixed reception upon release, enthusiastically welcomed by fans of the genre and of related bands such as Isis and Neurosis. Belgian record label Hypertension Records released it on double LP.

The album includes no vocals, instead focusing on extended instrumentation evolving slowly, usually into a crescendo. This would make the album best described as post rock. Throughout the album, the motifs of urban decay and human extinction are expressed via samples, and the poetic nature of the song titles.

== Theme ==
According to the band, "There is an underlying theme to this record. The literature on the subject is almost limitless, but it basically breaks down to this: There have previously been five “mass extinction events” on earth that have been scientifically realized, dating back from 440 million years ago. These events have resulted in the extinction of 19% - 54% of all species on earth at each specific time period. The first five events have been caused by natural elements, including the known impacts with meteors and the like. We are currently experiencing the sixth extinction event, which is the first one to be caused by a single species on our planet, which happens to be humanity."

It has been also postulated that a major inspiration of the album is T. S. Eliot's Preludes, as "the original idea of using the word 'sparrows' came from the words of T. S. Eliot", and it is within Preludes that the sparrow is referenced, as a symbol of mankind's abuse of nature. "Sunlight Through the Shutters", from the final song, is a recurring image in Eliot's work; notably "And the light crept up between the shutters, And you heard the sparrows in the gutters" from "Preludes" part III, line 31. The theme of mankind's destruction of nature is concordant with the concept pressing forward the album also.

== Track listing ==
All tracks are written by Red Sparowes.

No.	Title	Length
1.	"Alone and Unaware, the Landscape was Transformed in Front of Our Eyes"	8:27
2.	"Buildings Began to Stretch Wide Across the Sky, And the Air Filled with a Reddish Glow"	7:22
3.	"The Soundless Dawn Came Alive as Cities Began to Mark the Horizon"	4:18
4.	"Mechanical Sounds Cascaded Through the City Walls and Everyone Reveled in Their Ignorance"	11:19
5.	"A Brief Moment of Clarity Broke Through the Deafening Hum, but It Was Too Late"	5:59
6.	"Our Happiest Days Slowly Began to Turn into Dust"	5:40
7.	"The Sixth Extinction Crept Up Slowly, Like Sunlight Through the Shutters, as We Looked Back in Regret" (actual song ends at 11:57; silence for 4:00; untitled hidden track 3:35)	19:30

Japanese edition bonus track
No.	Title	Length
8.	"I Saw the Sky in the North Open to the Ground and Fire Poured Out"	7:07

The eighth track, "I Saw the Sky in the North Open to the Ground and Fire Poured Out", was initially only available on Japanese releases of the album. It was later released in the United States on a split EP with Gregor Samsa.

== Personnel ==
Band members

- Dana Berkowitz – drums
- Greg Burns – bass, pedal steel
- Jeff Caxide – guitar, bass guitar
- Josh Graham – guitar, piano, album artwork
- Bryant Clifford Meyer – guitar, organ

Other personnel

- Bill Dooley – mastering
- Desmond Shea – recording
