= A Storm of Light =

American heavy metal band

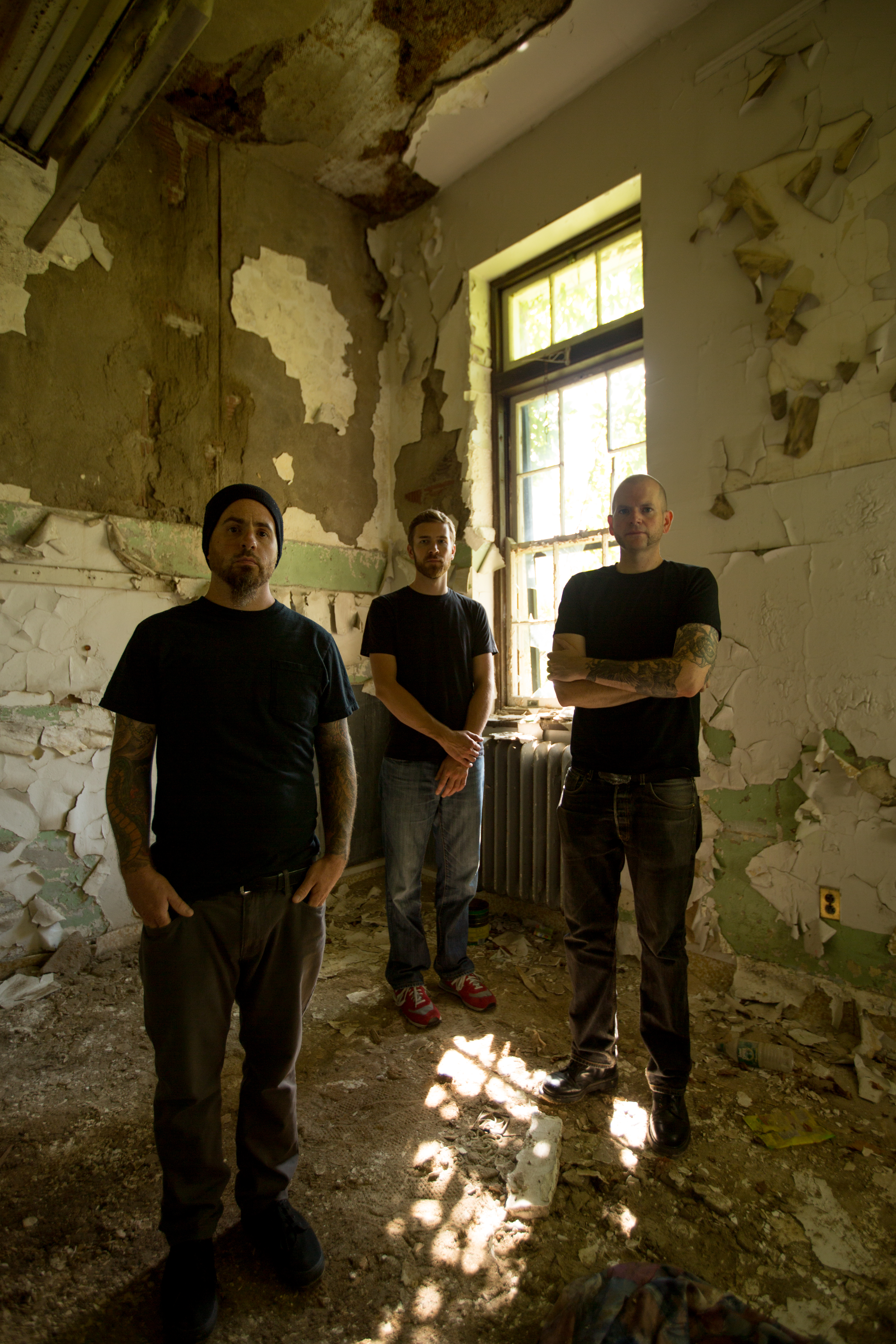
- A Storm of Light in 2014

Background information
- Origin: Brooklyn, New York, U.S.
- Genres: Post-metal, doom metal, sludge metal, post-rock, hard rock
- Years active: 2008–present
- Labels: Neurot, Robotic Empire
- Members: Josh Graham; Domenic Seita; Billy Graves
- Website: astormoflight.com

A Storm of Light is an American heavy metal band from New York City, formed in 2008.

They have been categorized as post-rock, post-metal, doom metal, sludge metal and hard rock, but have moved toward a darker and heavier metal sound. Rock-A-Rolla magazine's review of Nations to Flames states: "In upping the aggression, intensity and songwriting ability, they are once again overshadowing what's gone before and giving new reasons to appreciate a band that are already becoming one of the most crucial heavy acts around."

As of May 2023, the group have not released new music or performed live since 2018. Their website includes the statement "Indefinite Hiatus or Peace Out? Who knows."

== History ==
A Storm of Light was founded in 2008 by bassist Domenic Seita and vocalist/guitarist/keyboardist Josh Graham. Graham is a former member of the post-rock outfit Red Sparowes, songwriter in Battle of Mice, and a longtime visual artist in residence with Neurosis (2000–2012) and Soundgarden (since 2010). From 2011, drummer Billy Graves has completed the permanent lineup.

== Members ==
=== Current ===
- Josh Graham – guitar, vocals, keyboards
- Domenic Seita – bass
- Billy Graves – drums (As the Valley of Death Becomes Us, Our Silver Memories Fade & Nations to Flames)

=== Former ===
- Pete Angevice – drums (We Wept the Black Ocean Within)
- Andy Rice – drums (Forgive Us Our Trespasses)
- Vinnie Signorelli – drums (Primitive North)
- Andrea Black – guitar (Violitionist Sessions EP & 03 03 12 Cleveland (live))

== Discography ==
=== Albums ===
- And We Wept the Black Ocean Within (2008, Neurot Recordings)
- "Primitive North" Split with Nadja (2009)
- Forgive Us Our Trespasses (2009)
- As the Valley of Death Becomes Us, Our Silver Memories Fade (2011, Profound Lore)
- Nations to Flames (2013, Southern Lord)
- Anthroscene (2018, Translation Loss Records)
