= Some Heavy Ocean =

Studio album by Emma Ruth Rundle
- Released: May 20, 2014
- Recorded: The Farm
- Genre: Folk
- Length: 37:14
- Label: Sargent House
- Producer: Chris Common, Emma Ruth Rundle

Professional ratings
Review scores
| Source | Rating |
|---|---|
| AbsolutePunk | 8.8/10 |
| AllMusic | 3.5/5 stars |
| Pitchfork | 7.4 |

Some Heavy Ocean is the first official studio album by American singer-songwriter Emma Ruth Rundle, released on May 20, 2014 by Sargent House. Writing for the album took place between summer 2012 and 2013. The record was co-produced by Rundle and labelmate Chris Common, with recording completed at Sargent House's in-home studio. Rundle has named "Living With the Black Dog" as her favorite track on the record. The track "Oh Sarah" was said to be the first track written for the record.

== Track listing ==
| No. | Title | Length |
|---|---|---|
| 1. | "Some Heavy Ocean" | 1:43 |
| 2. | "Shadows of My Name" | 3:32 |
| 3. | "Your Card the Sun" | 0:49 |
| 4. | "Run Forever" | 3:55 |
| 5. | "Haunted Houses" | 4:42 |
| 6. | "Arms I Know So Well" | 3:43 |
| 7. | "Oh Sarah" | 5:37 |
| 8. | "Savage Saint" | 4:21 |
| 9. | "We Are All Ghosts" | 4:10 |
| 10. | "Living with the Black Dog" | 4:42 |
| Total length: | | 37:14 |

== Personnel ==
Some Heavy Ocean album personnel adapted from AllMusic.

- Emma Ruth Rundle – vocals, bass guitar, flute, guitar, keyboards, production, composition
- Andrea Calderon – strings, vocals, string arranging
- Chris Common – bass guitar, drums, keyboards, percussion, vocals, engineering, mixing, production
- Greg Burns – pedal steel guitar, photography
- Henry Kohen – additional guitar on "Shadows of My Name"
- Marty Rifkin – mastering, mixing
- Sonny Kay – layout
