= Red Sparowes =

American post-rock band

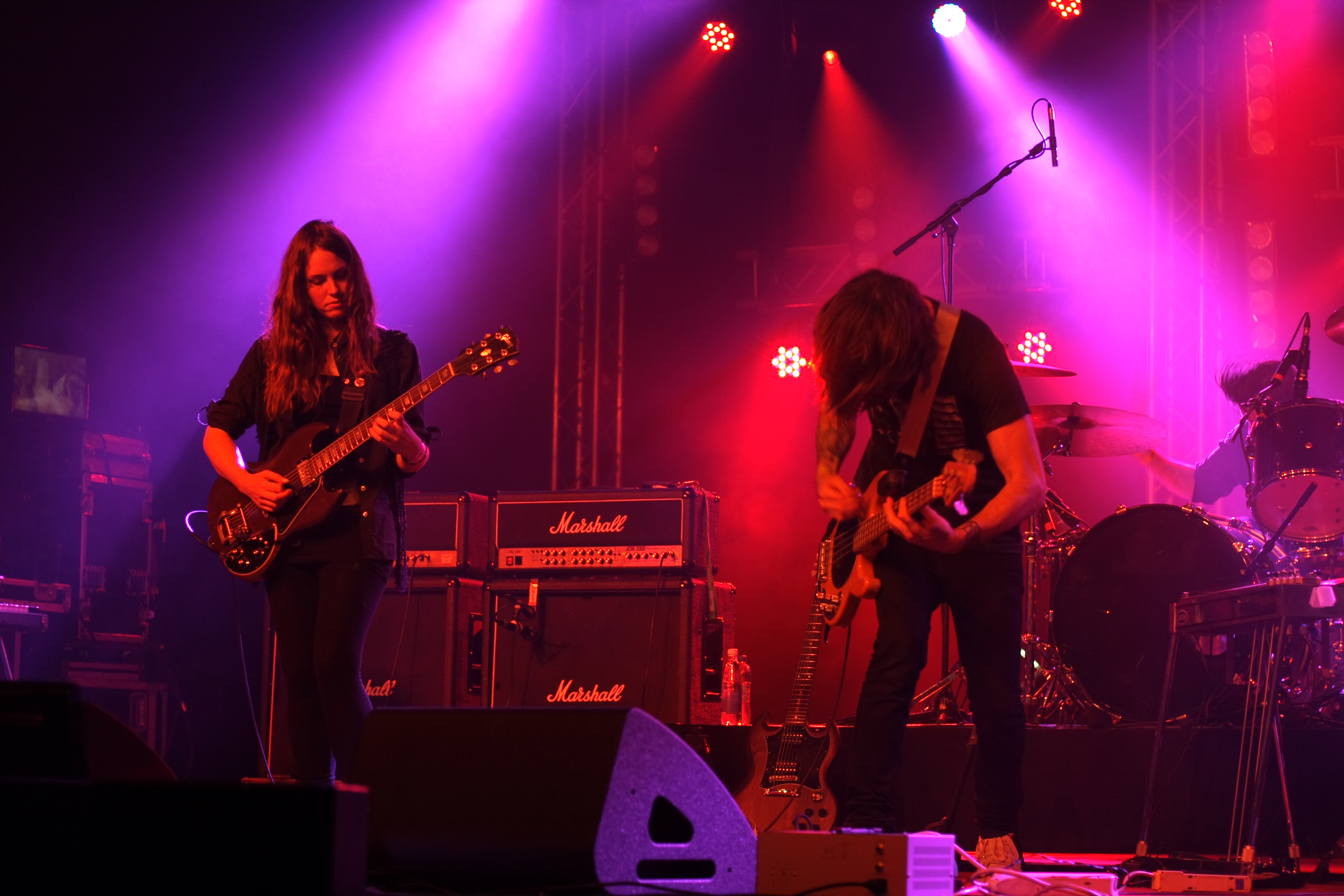

Background information
- Origin: Los Angeles, California, U.S.
- Genres: Post-rock, post-metal, instrumental rock
- Years active: 2003–2011, 2019-present
- Labels: Sargent House, Neurot Recordings, Robotic Empire, Hypertension
- Members: Bryant Clifford Meyer; Greg Burns; Andy Arahood; David Clifford; Emma Ruth Rundle
- Past members: Jeff Caxide; Dana Berkowitz; Josh Graham; Brendan Tobin
- Website: redsparowes.com

Red Sparowes is an American musical group based in Los Angeles. Their style is mostly instrumental and influenced by post-rock and post metal, emphasizing experimental soundscapes and featuring prominent use of pedal steel guitar - an unusual instrument for these genres.

Members of Red Sparrowes have also been part of other bands including Isis, Marriages, The Nocturnes, Halifax Pier, Angel Hair, Neurosis, and Pleasure Forever.

== History ==
Red Sparowes formed in 2003 as a side project for its members. They signed to Neurot Recordings, Neurosis's record label. They recorded some demos for their debut album, and this led to tours with The Dillinger Escape Plan and Made Out of Babies in 2004. The debut was recorded in May 2004 by engineer Desmond Shea, with the resulting sound in the vein of guitarists Bryant Clifford Meyer and Jeff Caxide's band Isis, Chicago post-rock/metal outfit Pelican, as well as bands as varied as Sonic Youth and The Cure. Members Jeff Caxide and Dana Berkowitz relocated in late 2004, thus forcing them out of the band. They were replaced by Andy Arahood on guitar and bass, and David Clifford on drums.

Red Sparowes' first studio album, At the Soundless Dawn, was released in February 2005, following Clifford Meyer's Isis in their initial tours in support of Panopticon. Shortly after this release, a split 12" album was released with Gregor Samsa. The Red Sparowes side contained the second track from At the Soundless Dawn, "Buildings Began to Stretch Wide Across the Sky, And the Air Filled with a Reddish Glow," as well as a track recorded during the album's recording sessions with guitar by Michael Gallagher of Isis, initially only available on the Japanese release of the album. Following the release of the album, the band headlined a tour in Europe and participated in an American tour with Pelican, Big Business and Breather Resist. After touring the band released their follow-up record, Every Red Heart Shines Toward the Red Sun, in 2006. This release was followed by more touring of North America and Europe, including shows in the US with Nick Cave and the Bad Seeds.

In early 2008 Josh Graham parted ways with the rest of the band to pursue musical project A Storm of Light, and was replaced by guitarist Brendan Tobin.

In May 2008, Red Sparowes recorded new material with engineer Toshi Kasai (Melvins, Big Business, Tool), and in August that year the EP Aphorisms was released digitally.

Tobin departed in 2009 and in June, the band announced Emma Ruth Rundle as his replacement. Red Sparowes began recording their third full-length studio album with Kasai on August 24, 2009. The album, titled The Fear Is Excruciating, But Therein Lies the Answer, was released on April 6, 2010.

Red Sparowes had more or less been on an indefinite hiatus since late 2011, but in late September 2019, the band was announced to be playing at the 2020 edition of the Roadburn festival, as part of a lineup curated by guitarist Emma Ruth Rundle. Former guitarist Brendan Tobin and Baroness drummer Allen Blickle were announced for the show, joining 2011-era members Andy Arahood, Greg Burns, Clifford Meyer, and Rundle to form a six-piece band. On March 24, 2020, the band announced via their official Facebook account that their show had been postponed due to the COVID-19 pandemic, similar to many concerts and tours in 2020. In the same post the band also confirmed that they were working on a new album.

== Discography ==
=== Studio albums ===
- At the Soundless Dawn (2005)
- Every Red Heart Shines Toward the Red Sun (2006)
- The Fear Is Excruciating, but Therein Lies the Answer (2010)

=== Live albums ===
- Oh Lord, God of Vengeance, Show Yourself! (2006)

=== EPs ===
- Aphorisms (2008)

=== Splits ===
- Untitled split with Gregor Samsa (2005)
- As The Black Wind Withers in the Sky, We Are Graced Dimly in Our Dreams split with Grails (2006)
- Triad split with Made Out of Babies and Battle of Mice (2006)

== Band members ==
Current

- Bryant Clifford Meyer – guitar, keyboards (formerly of Isis) (2003-2011, 2019–present)
- Greg Burns – bass, pedal steel guitar (of Marriages & Halifax Pier) (2003-2011, 2019–present)
- Andy Arahood – guitar, bass (of Angel Hair) (2005-2011, 2019–present)
- David Clifford – drums (of The VSS, Pleasure Forever, Marriages) (2005-2011, 2019–present)
- Emma Ruth Rundle – guitar (of Marriages & The Nocturnes) (2009-2011, 2019–present)

Former

- Josh Graham – guitar, keyboards (of Neurosis (visuals), Battle of Mice, A Storm of Light) (2003-2008)
- Jeff Caxide – guitar, bass (formerly of Isis) (2003-2004)
- Dana Berkowitz – drums (2003-2004)
- Brendan Tobin – guitar (of Made Out of Babies) (2008-2009)
