= Blake Judd =

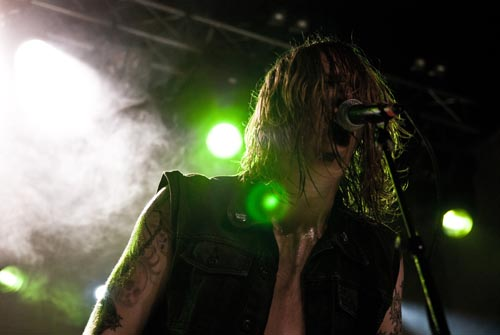
- Blake Judd performing with Nachtmystium at Hole In The Sky - Bergen Metal Fest 2008

Background information
- Also known as: Azentrius
- Born: Blakely Judd; November 13, 1982 (age 43)
- Origin: Wheaton, Illinois, United States
- Genres: Black metal, psychedelic rock, experimental rock
- Instruments: Vocals, guitar, bass
- Years active: 2000–2015, 2017–2020, 2024
- Labels: Battle Kommand Records, Ascension Monuments Media
- Website: Battle Kommand Homepage

Blake Judd (born November 13, 1982) is an American musician and co-founder of now-defunct Battle Kommand Records. Formerly the lead vocalist and frontman of the metal band Nachtmystium, Judd also contributed to musical acts and projects such as Twilight, Krieg, and Hate Meditation. He previously performed under the stage name "Azentrius".

Judd's music career was abruptly derailed in 2013 after he was arrested and charged with misdemeanor theft. The incident also exposed his heroin addiction to the public. Judd's reputation was further damaged when fans, bandmates, and business partners openly accused him of conducting fraudulent business practices. He later admitted to deceiving fans and left the music industry in 2014. He later reunited Nachtmystium in 2017 to perform two live shows and record a new studio album before dissolving the band again in 2020. Judd left the music industry to pursue other careers, but returned in 2024 to finish a Nachtmystium album.

== Biography ==
=== Early life ===
Judd was raised in Wheaton, Illinois, and took an early interest in music due to his parents' taste in classic rock. He saw The Allman Brothers Band perform live when he was in the second grade, and cites it as a major influence on his musical career. Judd took up the guitar when he was twelve years old, and began to listen to heavy metal shortly later.

=== Musical career ===
He began playing in bands in his late teens. He served as the vocalist and guitarist for Ezurate and in the now-defunct thrash and black metal band Helms Deep. In his spare time, he worked at Metal Haven, a heavy metal record store in Chicago. Judd eventually founded Nachtmystium with a friend as a side-project, which he originally operated out of his parents' basement. He started to become more involved in Nachtmystium, then a raw black metal band, after receiving positive feedback from his audience. Judd incorporated psychedelic elements into the band's material, influenced by his love for progressive rock bands such as Pink Floyd and The Allman Brothers Band, while also using various black metal elements. Nachtmystium became Judd's primary focus and his most successful music project.

Outside of Nachtmystium, Judd founded an independent record label, Battle Kommand Records, with Rebecca Clegg in St. Charles, Illinois. In 2005, he was commissioned by the Swedish underground label Total Holocaust Records to create the black metal "supergroup" Twilight. Twilight featured Wrest from Leviathan, producer Sanford Parker, Stavros Giannopoulos of The Atlas Moth, Imperial of Krieg, Malefic of Xasthur, and Thurston Moore of Sonic Youth. Additionally, Judd was a session musician on Krieg's final album Blue Miasma (2006). Judd for many years performed under the pseudonym "Azentrius". Also, Judd played guitar on Obscurus Advocam's 2007 album Verbia Daemonicus.

Judd voiced critical opinions towards modern black metal. In an interview with MetalReviews.com, he claimed "most bands are just carbon copies of each other, musically, lyrically, image-wise and ideologically, although I question how big and evil half these maggots are". Judd voiced a similar opinion in an interview with The Metal Crypt, stating "Fuck modern black metal. There are a few good bands, but there are millions of horrible clones and overrated bands that are doing nothing new." However in a 2008 interview with The Daily Herald, he claimed to respect what he viewed as "real" black metal, and added "as a fan of black metal, I'm offended by someone who calls their music black metal and incorporates outside elements." While Nachtmystium was founded as a black metal band, Judd insisted the band had "left the black metal scene" after 2004. In an interview with Thrashpit.com, Judd stated, "It was cool at first but we're really not a traditional 'spikes and paint' band."

In 2013, after advising that Nachtmystium was on "something of a hiatus", Judd announced that his new band, Hate Meditation, would be his "main focus". Hate Meditation featured Judd on vocals and guitar, Wrest on bass, Job Bos of Dark Fortress on synth, and Sam Shroyer of Vitandus on drums. The band signed a two-album deal with Indie Recordings and released its debut album, Scars, in 2013.

Judd suspended his musical career due to substance abuse and legal problems in 2013. He announced Nachtmystium would reunite to perform two live shows in 2017 and work on new studio material. Judd stated he did not have plans to record or produce new music in the near future, and Earache Records acquired the rights to redistribute Nachtmystium's studio albums. He also announced the label would release a new compilation album, titled Retox: Remixes and Rarities, which contains previously unreleased demos and cover tracks from Nachtmystium and Twilight. Judd uploaded a copy of the album onto YouTube for fans to stream for free. He released the following statement: "Thank you all for your patience and I do hope to make things right with everyone I can who fell victim to my addiction issues by not receiving orders for music or merchandise. I intend on giving away every single record and CD I receive of these reissues, if that’s what it takes, to make things right with the fans whom I wronged and did not fulfill orders for."

Judd dissolved Nachtmystium in June 2020. Judd stated he would continue to work on writing and producing music, which will be released anonymously. However, he sporadically worked on an unfinished Nachtmystium album in 2022, which was ultimately released in 2024 as Blight Privilege. Judd stated he has no further plans to continue Nachtmystium during a 2024 interview.

=== Personal life ===
Judd's musical career was abruptly halted when he was arrested on October 5, 2013 and faced misdemeanor theft charges. He admitted to stealing and pawning his roommate’s guitar while trying to buy heroin. Judd had previously openly admitted to using cocaine, hallucinogens, marijuana and other recreational drugs since he was a teenager. However, Judd alleges he began using heroin after he severely injured his leg in 2009 and a doctor prescribed opioids to help him cope with pain. Judd purchased medication with opiates from the black market when his prescription had expired and later regularly abused heroin while touring with Nachtmystium. Before Judd's arrest, Century Media Records, Nachtmystium's label at the time, paid to send him to a drug rehabilitation clinic in Los Angeles operated by MusiCares. Judd claims the therapy was initially helpful, but he relapsed after embarking on a tour. In a later interview, Judd reflected on his addiction to heroin, commenting, "If I was a 'rockstar,' in my mind, it made it my divine right to be all fucked up on drugs—that's a rockstar's divine right, to be a drug addict."

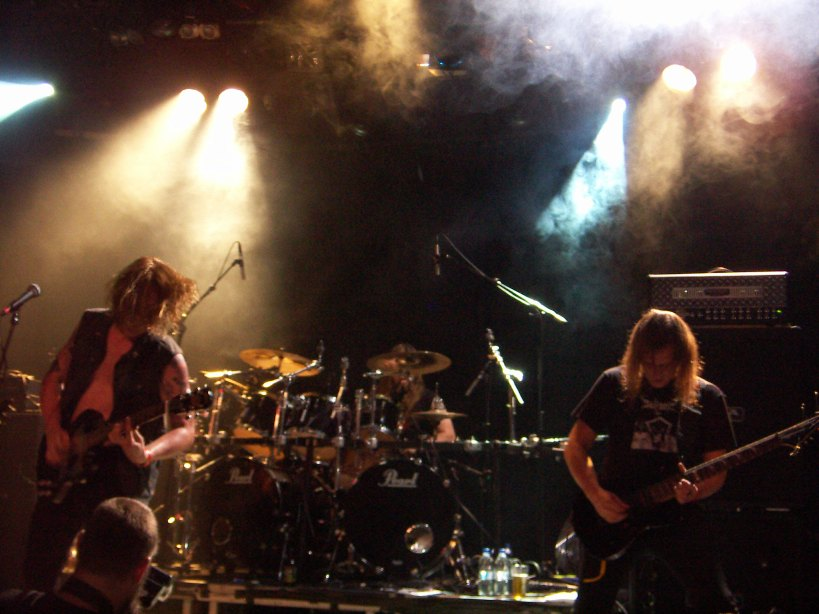
Judd (left) performing with Nachtmystium in 2008.

Judd disbanded Nachtmystium on November 13 after the band finished recording their final studio album, The World We Left Behind. Judd thanked Nachtmystium's fans for their support over the band's 13-year run and then retreated from his music career to seek additional treatment for his heroin addiction. Judd was encouraged by his fans' support during this period and considered reforming Nachtmystium to pursue future musical projects. In July 2014, Judd re-entered the music industry as an online re-seller of heavy metal albums and band merchandise.

A few months later, fans accused Judd of withholding merchandise that they had purchased from his Facebook storefront. Judd defended himself by stating that Century Media Records did not provide him with sufficient albums and amounts of merchandise for distribution. Nachtmystium's Facebook storefront was suddenly taken down and fans were not given closure about their orders. Century Media Records ultimately announced that they would provide a copy of the band's latest album to fans with a proof of purchase, and that they were parting ways with Judd and Nachtmystium.

On September 10, Neill "Imperial" Jameson, one of Judd's former bandmates and close friends, released an article for Vice Media detailing his first-hand accounts of Judd's heroin addiction. Jameson accused Judd of cheating him and his fellow Twilight band mates out of money on numerous occasions. He also alleged that Judd was accepting purchase orders from fans and then pocketing the money with no intention of providing them with merchandise. Yosuke Konishi, owner of Nuclear War Now! Productions, publicly accused Judd of withholding several albums that he had purchased in 2012. Another business partner, Alexandre Martinez of Deadlight Entertainment, alleged that Judd commissioned him to produce Nachtmystium merchandise and press albums, but never paid for the services.

Judd later admitted to defrauding several customers in order to feed his heroin addiction. Judd terminated his online business and became homeless without a source of income. He lived in a homeless shelter before finally seeking drug rehabilitation therapy in October 2015. Judd eventually left Chicago to stay with relatives in Louisville, Kentucky and continue his rehabilitation. He openly addressed his victims and fans in January 2016 to apologize for his wrongdoings.

In 2018, MetalSucks published an article containing reports and testimonies from online customers that Judd defrauded within the past year. Judd refuted these specific allegations and claimed he had been sober since 2015. In 2020, Judd stated he wished to pursue a career as a licensed drug rehabilitation counselor in California.

In a 2024 interview, Judd stated he permanently relocated to California and has not used hard drugs in over a half decade.

== Equipment ==
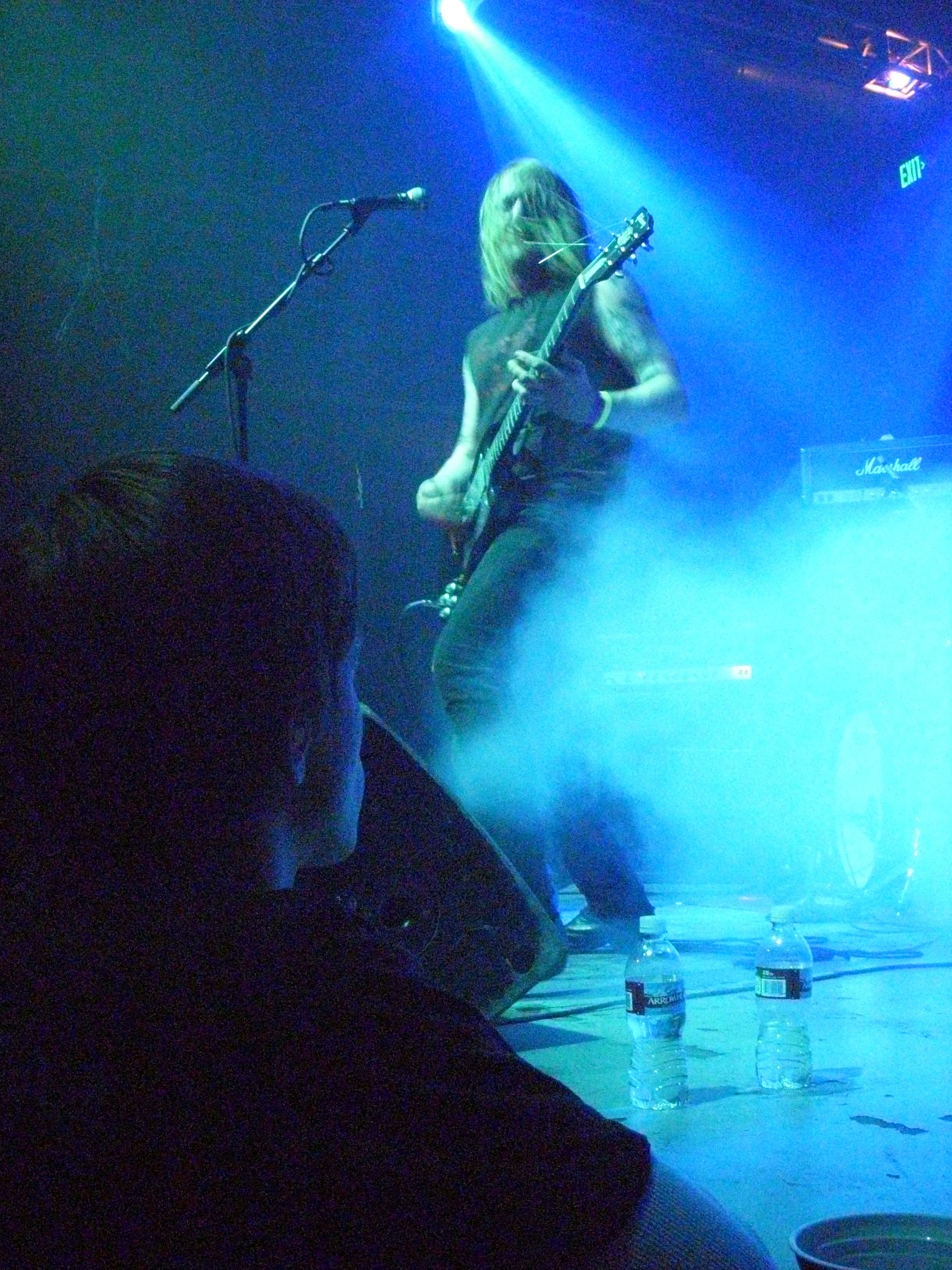
Judd playing live in 2008

- Gibson SG Standard (D tuning)
- BC Rich Mockingbird
- Sunn Model T reissue
- Emperor 6 by 12 cab w/ vintage 30s Celestion Speakers

=== Pedals ===
- Digitech Digidelay
- Moogerfooger MF-104Z delay
- Boss TU-2 Tuner
- Dunlop Crybaby Wah

== Select discography ==
=== With Nachtmystium ===
- Reign of the Malicious (2002)
- Demise (2004)
- Instinct: Decay (2006)
- Assassins: Black Meddle, Part I (2008)
- Addicts: Black Meddle, Part II (2010)
- Silencing Machine (2012)
- The World We Left Behind (2014)
- Retox: Remixes and Rarities (2017)
- Resilient (2018)
- Blight Privilege (2024)
- Ancient Howls of Dawning Fury (2025)

=== With Hate Meditation ===
- Condemned to Death (2003)
- Scars (2013)

=== With Twilight ===
- Twilight (2005)
- Monument to Time End (2010)
- Trident Death Rattle (2018)

=== With Krieg ===
- Blue Miasma (2006)
