= Club My War =

Club My War O)))
- Frequency: Ongoing
- Locations: Los Angeles, California (The Viper Room, others)
- Patrons: Eddie Solis, Brendon Crigler
- Website: Official website

Club My War (also known as Club My War O)))) is a platform for underground metal and punk bands to play at intimate venues in the greater Los Angeles area, notably Hollywood. Formed in 2009 by Eddie Solis of Southern Lord Records, events are held on a weekly or monthly basis at venues such as The Viper Room, Dragonfly, and Troubadour. Club My War hosted the first U.S. performance of doom metal superband Shrinebuilder, as well as performances by Dave Lombardo's new band Philm, Wolves in the Throneroom, Weedeater, 16, It's Casual, Black Cobra, Municipal Waste, and Torche.

== Overview ==
Club My War is an ongoing weekly or monthly event in the greater Los Angeles area, founded by Eddie Solis of the band It's Casual and Southern Lord Records. The recurring event hosts metal, hardcore punk, stoner rock, drone metal, and skate rock bands in small intimate venues. While Club My War operates at different locations such as The Viper Room, and was a regular event at The Relax Bar in Eastern Hollywood until 2010, when the venue closed. Included among multiple other venues are the Blue Monkey in Hollywood, East Side Luv in Boyle Heights, and The Dragonfly in Hollywood.

Club My War is frequently documented by music photographer Rick Kosick of Jackass and Big Brother, who started attending shows at The Relax Bar in early 2010.

== Notable shows ==
=== Shrinebuilder ===
On November 11, 2009, Club My War arranged and hosted the first live show in the United States by the recently formed doom metal supergroup Shrinebuilder. The band includes Scott "Wino" Weinrich of Saint Vitus and The Hidden Hand, Scott Kelly of Neurosis, Al Cisneros of Om and Sleep, and Dale Crover of the Melvins. The band had formed earlier in 2009, and had released their widely praised debut album Shrinebuilder just the month before. The band played two sets at the Viper Room. The venue and show were praised by Scott Kelly, especially for the intimacy and the "die-hard" mentality of the audience.

== Artists ==
The following is a partial list of artists and bands who have performed at Club My War, all subgenres of metal and punk.

- 16
- Agent Steel
- Ancestors
- Backwoods Payback
- Black Math Horsemen
- Behold the Monilith
- Black Cobra
- Bruce Cambell
- Chingalera
- The Chuck Dukowski Sextet
- Clouds
- Crackula
- Crom
- Dale Nixon's Army
- Dead Lazlo's Place
- Dog
- Eat the Living
- Fatso Jetson
- Fetus Eaters
- Fireball Ministry Listening Party
- The Fucking Wrath
- Gallery
- Groamville (Feat. Pascual Romero)
- GFP (ft. Tony Alva)
- Gypsy Hawk
- Green and Wood
- House of Broken Promises
- Hallowed Engine
- Harassor
- Helms Alee
- Holy Grail
- It's Casual
- Jucifer
- Lightning Swords of Death
- Lozen
- Matador
- Massengil
- The Meatmen
- Mountains of Blow
- Municipal Waste
- Music Hates You
- Nighthorse
- Of The Horizon
- Philm (ft. Dave Lombardo)
- Professor
- Progeria
- Rats Eyes
- Rwake
- Rtx
- Sasquatch
- Scott Kelly (acoustic)
- Shrinebuilder
- The Shrine
- Stahl Brothers
- SMD
- Snake's Alive
- Strangled by Strangulation (Feat. Pascual Romero)
- Torche
- Totimoshi
- Warcry
- Weedeater
- Scott "Wino" Weinrich (acoustic)
- White Wizzard
- Wolves in the Throne Room
