= Eddie Solis =

American singer

- Born: East Los Angeles County, California
- Origin: Los Angeles, California
- Genres: Hardcore punk, hard rock, metal
- Occupation(s): Music industry professional, musician, music promoter
- Instrument(s): Guitar, vocals
- Years active: 1987-present
- Labels: SST, Priority, Southern Lord
- Website: www.itscasual.tv

Eddie Solis is a Los Angeles music industry professional, musician, and show promoter. He has worked in sales, marketing and artist promotion at labels such as Century Media, Priority Records, Macey Lipman Marketing, and SST Records, where he worked with Black Flag. He is no longer the general manager at Southern Lord Records. Until 2010 he was booking manager of the Hollywood heavy rock venue The Relax Bar. He is also the manager of Club My War, a facilitator of underground metal hardcore and avant-garde music in Hollywood proper.

In 2001 Solis founded the hardcore punk duo It's Casual, which has released three studio albums on CD/LP and played with bands such as Story of the Year, Mastodon, High on Fire, Zeke, Fu Manchu, and Death by Stereo. He was also a founding member of the hard rock band Revolution Mother with Mike Vallely in 2005.

== Early life ==
Eddie Solis was born and raised in East Los Angeles County. As a child his father used to carry him around on his shoulders while listening to Black Sabbath, Led Zeppelin, and The Who, all bands which Solis has cited as influential on his later music.

Solis has stated he is the result of "basically growing up around a gang-infested area with lots of negativity." He turned to skateboarding as an escape, and his parents let him build a halfpipe in the backyard. Solis would "put Slayer on the radio superloud" and practice tricks with friends. When he was fifteen he started his first band, a Ramones cover group called Endless Vacation, which played shows in his parents' living room. They also performed shows for donations to repair the halfpipe.

He began renting skateboarding videos in 1987, and the soundtracks exposed him to bands such as Black Flag, Dinosaur Junior, Bl'ast!, The Minutemen, and other bands on the SST Records label. He would write down the band names and special order the records because local record stores didn't have them in stock.

== Music industry career ==
Right out of highschool Solis began working in the music industry. In 1993 he became an intern at the metal label Century Media in Santa Monica, commuting from his home in Pico Rivera. He stayed about a month. From 1995 to 1996 he began working in retail marketing for artists at Priority Records, a rap label featuring artists such as N.W.A., Dr. Dre, Ice Cube. While there he assisted Guy Pinhas of The Obsessed and Goatsnake.

In 1996 Solis worked closely with Macey Lipman of Macey Lipman Marketing, which is famous for being the first independent marketing company for the American record industry. Solis worked on releases by artists such as Yanni, The Kinks, Paul Anka, Vanessa L. Williams, Trisha Yearwood, John Tesh, Sting, and Lou Rawls, as well as singer Andrea Bocelli and his album Romanza. He remained with Lipman Marketing until 1999.

SST Records hired Solis in 2002. He began working directly with Greg Ginn and served as a publicist for bands such as Black Flag for their reunion. While working at SST he became aware of Southern Lord Records, particularly albums such as their Saint Vitus reissues and Probot. He began taking an interest in the label, and after making contact with the founder, he began working for Southern Lord in 2004 as general manager. He handles sales, distribution management, and promotions.

=== Relax Bar ===
In 2005, Solis was walking down the road near the Southern Lord offices in East Hollywood, and found a small venue named The Relax Bar with its doors open. He noticed a small stage with a drumset and small amps. He pitched the idea of a metal venue to the Thai owners through a translator, who were supportive after hearing tracks by High on Fire, It's Casual, and selection of punk and grindcore. Solis described The Relax Bar as "a place where everything underneath the metal umbrella is welcome, whether it's experimental, progressive, black metal, death metal, thrash, hardcore." The venue was at 5511 Hollywood Blvd. and never used a "pay-to-play" model. Until it closed in 2010 it was considered a hub for the Los Angeles heavy music scene, and Solis had booked approximately 400 thrash, drone, speed, doom, noise, and punk shows at the venue by 2010. Bands included It's Casual, G.F.P with Tony Alva, The Meatmen, Municipal Waste, Unholy Grave, and Phobia.

=== Club My War ===
Solis is the founder of Club My War, the longest running facilitator of underground metal hardcore and avant-garde music in Hollywood proper. Solis put on the first North American show with the band Shrinebuilder, which consists of Scott Kelly of Neurosis. Al Cisneros of Om and Sleep, Dale Crover of The Melvins and Scott "Wino" Weinrich of Saint Vitus.

He has also promoted shows in Los Angeles for Municipal Waste, Torche and Unholy Grave, and put on the very first show for Dave Lombardo of Slayer's band Philm.

== Musical career ==
=== It's Casual ===
In 2001 Solis founded the hardcore punk duo It's Casual in Los Angeles. It's Casual has released three studio albums and played with bands such as Story of the Year, Bullets and Octane, Fu Manchu, Mastodon, Mondo Generator Death by Stereo, and High on Fire. The band continues to actively play in Southern California.

Solis is officially endorsed by Fernandes Guitars, Hiwatt Amplification, and Lace Music Products.

=== Revolution Mother ===
Solis was a founding member of the Los Angeles hard rock band Revolution Mother in late 2005, when he teamed up with skateboarder Mike Vallely and punk veterans Jason Hampton and Wal Rashidi. Solis had met Vallely while working at SST, and Vallely subsequently asked him to play bass and with the start of Vallely's post-Mike V. and the Rats band. Revolution Mother utilized blues-riffs and drew comparisons to Bl'ast, Motörhead, and Black Flag. Solis took part in the band's national tour called the "Zumiez Couch Tour" with CKY, and played on their Enjoy the Ride CD/EP.

== Personal life ==
Solis continues to live in Los Angeles.

== Discography ==
Studio albums

- Buicregl (CD/LP 2002)
- Stop Listening to Bad Music (CD/LP 2004)
- The New Los Angeles (CD/LP 2007)

EPs

- It's Casual/Bullet Treatment Split (7" vinyl)
- Enjoy the Ride by Revolution Mother (CD/EP)

Videos

- The New Los Angeles (directed by Roboshobo)
- Redline Video (directed by Rick Kosick of Jackass)
