= Shrinebuilder =

American stoner/doom metal band

Background information
- Origin: United States
- Genres: Stoner metal, doom metal
- Years active: 2008−2011
- Label: Neurot
- Members: Scott Kelly; Al Cisneros; Dale Crover; Scott "Wino" Weinrich

Shrinebuilder was an American stoner/doom metal supergroup consisting of various established musicians, particularly of the doom metal subgenre. Their lone, self-titled album was released in October 2009.

== History ==
=== Founding ===
The band's origins were established around 2003–04, when Al Cisneros of the band Om contacted Scott "Wino" Weinrich and proposed that they form a new collaborative three piece group with Om drummer Chris Hakius. Cisneros named the band, and it was intended that Wino would be the only vocalist. A few years later, and after sporadically working on some music together, Cisneros enlisted Neurosis frontman Scott Kelly on guitar and vocals to round out the band to a four-piece. Of the request to join Shrinebuilder, Kelly added, "He [Cisneros] told me that this would be the name when he asked me to join and I thought it was great. It makes sense to me. I think music is shrine, music is religion, music is a way of life. It has its own mythology, it has its own theology, it has its own gods."

As time passed, word and anticipation began to gather on the internet about this new act. Shrinebuilder were becoming well known, yet nothing had been heard regarding the act. In early 2008, drummer Chris Hakius decided to retire from playing music, and as a result, Dale Crover of Melvins was brought in to replace him. Over the next year the band sent computer files to one another, refining their material, and rehearsed when possible in various configurations of two or three in Baltimore, San Francisco, Ashland and Los Angeles.

=== Debut album ===
In January 2009 the full band met together for the first time to set about recording the material they had previously sketched out. Kelly documented the recording sessions via his blog site "We Burn Through the Night". The debut Shrinebuilder record was recorded in three days, with Crover and Toshi Kasai (collectively known as The Deaf Nephews) producing. Commenting upon the recording experience, Kelly stated, "The sheer weight of it all pushed this thing into another realm the moment the decision was made to do this. The fifth member of Shrinebuilder is the godhead. This record honours the traditions set forth by all those that walked through these endless halls before us."

Wino later added some additional guitar overdubs, and the album was released in October 2009.

=== Live performances ===
Following the album's release, the band announced a string of concerts, and the first Shrinebuilder track, "Pyramid of the Moon", was added to the band's Myspace page. On November 11, 2009, Club My War arranged and hosted the band's first live show in the United States at The Viper Room. The band played two sets and the show was praised by Scott Kelly as a success. This jumped in front of another show tentatively billed as Shrinebuilder's debut show, which was scheduled for November 14, 2009, at Chicago's Empty Bottle. The band's first New York City performance was the next night at Le Poisson Rouge, where they notably covered Joy Division.

Since that time Shrinebuilder have played sporadically as and when the members schedules have allowed. Whilst unable to fly over to Europe to tour during the Eyjafjallajökull volcano eruption of 2010, the band returned to LA and completed the writing stage of their second record. One year later the band performed on the main stage at the 16th Roadburn Festival in Tilburg, the Netherlands which they had been set to appear at in 2010 had the volcano eruption not hindered flights.

=== Continuing viability ===
In an interview in late 2012, Kelly stated that he did not know if there would be another Shrinebuilder album. In a May 2014 interview, Wino stated that "Cisneros is insane so Shrinebuilder is not going to happen."

== Discography ==
- Shrinebuilder (Neurot Recordings, 2009)

== Members ==
- Al Cisneros (Om, Sleep, Asbestosdeath) – bass, vocals
- Scott "Wino" Weinrich (The Hidden Hand, Spirit Caravan, Saint Vitus, Place of Skulls, The Obsessed) – guitar, vocals
- Scott Kelly (Neurosis, Tribes of Neurot, Blood and Time) – guitar, vocals
- Dale Crover (Melvins, Altamont, The Men of Porn, Nirvana) – drums
