= Death to the World =

Eastern Orthodox zine published in the United States

Death To The World is an Eastern Orthodox zine published in the United States.

== History ==
Death to the World was started by monks and nuns from the St Herman of Alaska Monastery in Platina, California, as a medium of evangelism to teens involved in the punk subculture by monastics who were ex-punks. A founding member was Justin Marler who, soon after recording Volume One with seminal doom metal band Sleep in 1991, left for seven years of monastic life while Sleep went on to become metal icons.

Originally, the monastics planned to submit an article about Seraphim Rose to the magazine Maximum RocknRoll. They later decided to try to place an ad for their monastery, but were rejected, being told that the magazine "only [ran] ads for music and zines". This inspired them to begin a zine.

The first issue was printed in December 1994, featuring a monk holding a skull on the cover. The hand-drawn bold letters across the top read "DEATH TO THE WORLD, The Last True Rebellion" and the back cover had the caption: "they hated me without a cause." The first issue, decorated with ancient icons and lives of martyrs inside, was advertised in Maximum RocknRoll and brought letters from all around the world.

The zine continued to be published and distributed at punk shows and underground hangouts. It was estimated that at one time, there were 50,000 in circulation. The monastics put out 12 issues in all, after which they continued distributing the zine but did not publish new issues.

Eight years later, the zine was revived by convert members of Saint Barnabas Antiochian Orthodox Church in Costa Mesa, California. New issues are submitted to the St Herman monks for editing and revision, and were released quarterly. The zine is currently run by Fr John Valadez, the priest and pastor of St Timothy Antiochian Orthodox Church in Lompoc, California. It has evolved in its format and is currently edited by a group of priests and laity and prints new issues annually.

The zine had a considerable impact on counter culture youth during the mid to late 90s, which caught the attention of mainstream press, and quickly led to the release of Justin Marler's first book in 1997, Youth of the Apocalypse, (co-authored with a fellow monastic).
