= Variations on a Theme (Om album) =

Studio album by Om
- Released: February 14, 2005
- Recorded: 2004, The Groove Room
- Genre: Stoner metal; doom metal; drone metal
- Length: 44:24
- Label: Holy Mountain
- Producer: Om and Billy Anderson

Om chronology
Variations on a Theme (2005)	Conference of the Birds (2006)

Professional ratings
Review scores
Source	Rating
AllMusic	4/5 stars
Pitchfork Media	(7.8/10)
Tiny Mix Tapes	3.5/5 stars

Variations on a Theme is the debut studio album by American rock band Om. It was the first recording in several years to feature Sleep bassist/vocalist Al Cisneros. The vinyl version of the album was released on April 18, 2005. It was pressed on black, clear and clear purple vinyl.

== Background ==
When Om was formed in 2003, they began recording practice tapes. At the time, bassist-vocalist Al Cisneros' girlfriend got them in contact with John Whitston, founder of Holy Mountain Records, who quickly signed them and gave them time to record. Around the same time, the band performed its first shows at the Bottom of the Hill and The Independent in San Francisco.

== Track listing ==
No.	Title	Length
1.	"On the Mountain at Dawn"	21:16
2.	"Kapila's Theme"	11:56
3.	"Annapurna"	11:52
Total length:		44:24

== Personnel ==
- Al Cisneros – vocals, bass
- Chris Hakius – drums, percussion
- Produced by Om and Billy Anderson
