= Justin Marler =

American musician (born 1972)

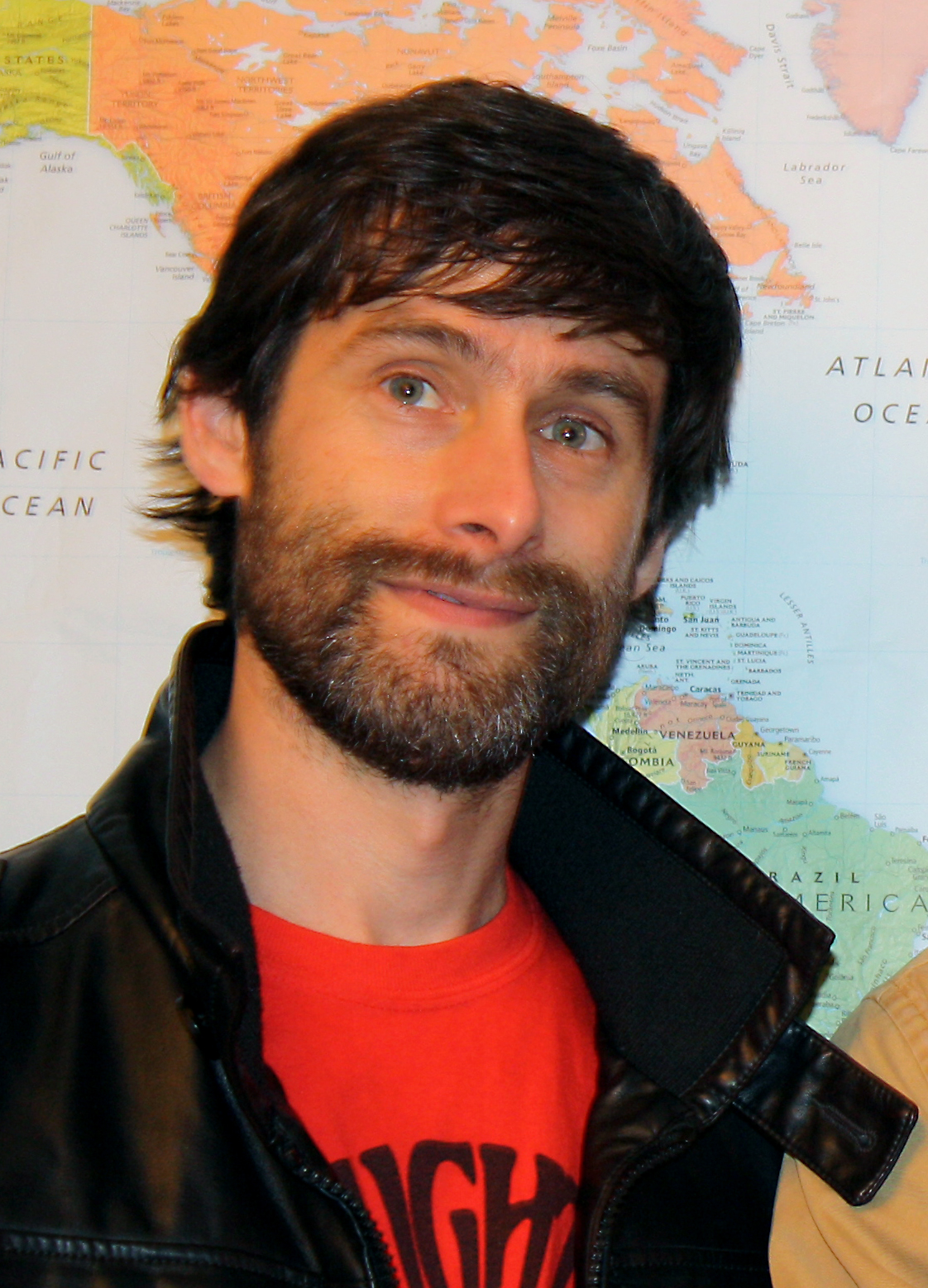
- Marler in 2011

Background information
- Born: July 29, 1972 (age 53)
- Origin: Chico, California, U.S.
- Genres: Doom metal; Stoner rock; Christian punk; Hardcore punk (early)
- Years active: 1990, 1999–2009
- Labels: London, Very Small, Earache, Tee Pee, The Music Cartel, Catacomb

Justin Marler (born July 29, 1972) is an American musician. He is known for being a founding member of the stoner rock band Sleep and for leaving a burgeoning career in music to become a monk in an Eastern Orthodox monastery.

In 1990, Marler joined the members of a little-known band called Asbestosdeath (with Al Cisneros, Chris Hakius and Matt Pike), which the members later renamed Sleep. Soon after recording Sleep's first full-length record, Volume One, Marler vanished, while the band went on to become metal icons.

Marler turned up at Saint Herman of Alaska Monastery in northern California and was later transferred to a monastery on a nearly-deserted island in Alaska. During his seven-year stint as a monk, he founded the widely distributed zine titled Death to the World. The zine had a considerable impact on youth counterculture during the mid- to late-1990s, which caught the attention of the mainstream press and quickly led to the release of Marler's first book, Youth of the Apocalypse, which he co-authored with a fellow monastic.

In 1999, Marler left his reclusive life in the monastery and returned to California where he restarted his music career, with former Sleep bandmate Chris Hakius, as the lead singer for an alternative band called The Sabians. Marler then moved to Austin, Texas in 2005 where he remained a musician and publishing author, active in the Austin music scene with his current band, Shiny Empire. In 2015 Marler started a Christian punk band called Quick And The Dead. In 2008 the band released their album "Going Home." On 25 November 2015 the band released an album Hymns for the Apocalypse. Album sales went to Christian communities of Syria aggravated by IS persecution.

== Books ==
- Youth of the Apocalypse, 1997, St. Herman Press
- Door to Paradise, 1998, St. Herman Press
- Austin, San Antonio and the Hill Country, first edition 2005, Moon Handbooks
- The Art of Unseen Warfare, first edition 2026, Big White Star

== Discography ==
=== with Sleep ===
- Sign Language, compilation (Allied Recordings, 1991)
- Very Small World, LP compilation (Very Small Records, 1991)
- Volume One (Tupelo Records, 1991)

=== as Monk John Marler ===
- Lamentations (Catacomb Records, 1997)

=== with The Sabians ===
- Beauty for Ashes (The Music Cartel, 2001)
- Shiver (The Music Cartel, 2003)

=== with Quick And The Dead ===
- Going Home (2008)
- Hymns for the Apocalypse (self produced, 2015)

== Sources ==
- Waltz, Mitzi. "Alternative and Activist Media", Edinburgh University Press, published 2005.
- Athitakis, Mark. "Riff Raff", SF Weekly, 2000.
- Duncan Collum, Danny. "Punks to Monks", Utne Reader, 1997.
- Moon.com. "About the Author", moon.com.
- AllMusic.com, "Sleep", AllMusic.
- Uttertrash.net, "Rock and Soul, an Interview with Justin Marler".
- combatmusicradio.com,
