= Sleep's Holy Mountain =

Studio album by Sleep
- Released: November 1992 (UK); March 1993 (US)
- Recorded: Razor's Edge (San Francisco, California)
- Genre: Doom metal, stoner metal
- Length: 52:09
- Label: Earache Records; Kreation Records (vinyl reissue)
- Producer: Sleep and Billy Anderson

Sleep chronology
Volume One (1991)	Sleep's Holy Mountain (1992)	Jerusalem (1999)

Professional ratings
Review scores
Source	Rating
AllMusic	4/5 stars
Collector's Guide to Heavy Metal	7/10

Sleep's Holy Mountain (also known as Holy Mountain) is the second studio album by the American stoner doom band Sleep. It was released in November 1992 in Europe and March 1993 in the US through Earache Records.

== Release and reception ==
The recordings that would become Sleep's Holy Mountain were originally sent to independent label Earache as a demo. The label immediately signed the band and released the recordings exactly as they were received. It was the last album to be released by the band as a fully functioning group for a while, as their subsequent albums up to 2018's The Sciences were released after the group had broken up.

The album, which includes the word "stoner" in the lyrics of two songs and prominently features cannabis leaves in its album art, is widely considered one of the seminal albums in the evolution of stoner rock. It became a favourite of the heavy metal press and the band was heralded, along with Kyuss, as leaders of the emerging stoner metal scene.

The songs "Dragonaut" and "Some Grass" are used in the 1997 Harmony Korine film Gummo.

In May 2009, the album was performed live in its entirety as part of the All Tomorrow's Parties-curated Don't Look Back series.

== Track listing ==
All music/lyrics written by Sleep.

No.	Title	Length
1.	"Dragonaut"	5:43
2.	"The Druid"	4:51
3.	"Evil Gypsy / Solomon's Theme"	7:06
4.	"Some Grass"	0:47
5.	"Aquarian"	5:38
6.	"Holy Mountain"	8:44
7.	"Inside the Sun"	5:44
8.	"From Beyond"	10:34
9.	"Nain's Baptism"	3:02
Total length:		52:09

=== 2009 reissue bonus tracks ===
No.	Title	Writer(s)	Length
10.	"Snowblind" (Black Sabbath cover)	Ozzy Osbourne; Tony Iommi; Geezer Butler; Bill Ward
11.	"Dragonaut" (music video)

== Personnel ==
Personnel taken from Sleep's Holy Mountain CD booklet.

Sleep

- Al Cisneros – bass, vocals
- Matt Pike – guitar
- Chris Hakius – drums

Technical personnel

- Engineered by Billy Anderson
- Produced by Sleep and Billy Anderson
- Cover artwork by Robert Klem

== Pressing history ==
Year	Label	Format	Country	Out of Print?	Notes
1992	Earache	CD	U.K.	Yes	
1992	Earache	LP	U.K.	Yes	
2002	Earache	LP	U.S./U.K.	Yes	Ltd. 2,000; 1,000 copies on green vinyl (U.S.), 1,000 copies on 220g black vinyl (U.K.)
2007	Kreation	LP	U.S.	Yes	Gatefold jacket; pressed on multiple limited colors, picture disc, and black vinyl
2009	Earache	CD	U.K.	No	Includes a bonus track and video
2012	Unofficial	2xLP	Europe	Yes	Double LP in black and clear versions
2015	Earache	LP	U.S./U.K.	No	Earache Full Range Dynamic (FDR) mastering
