= Arik Roper =

American illustrator and painter

- Born: Arik Moonhawk Roper; 1973 (age 52–53); New York City, United States
- Education: School of Visual Arts
- Known for: Drawing, illustration, painting
- Website: www.arikroper.com

Arik Moonhawk Roper (born 1973) is an illustrator and painter based in New York City. Roper grew up in Richmond, Virginia. His parents both being artists, his creativity was encouraged and he spent a great deal of time during childhood drawing. After graduating from the School of Visual Arts in 1995 specializing in cartooning, and silk-screening, he began working as a freelance illustrator and storyboard artist for advertising agencies in New York City. In 1998 he was hired as a storyboard revisionist at MTV Animation for the series Downtown. Later he directed his creativity toward more personal interests while shifting into the world of music-related visual art and packaging. After creating album art in the 1990s for underground rock and metal bands such as Buzzoven, Weedeater, and Nebula, and working often for Tee Pee Records, his reputation grew within the underground music scene. In the early 2000s he reconnected with Matt Pike of Sleep and created several album covers for the band High on Fire. He later went on to become closely associated with the band Sleep, having created several album covers for them, including the "bootleg" version of Jerusalem and two versions of the legendary Dopesmoker.

He has since developed a devoted following creating seminal record covers and screeprint posters for a wide variety of bands including rock and metal legends such as Earth, Sunn O))), Sleep, Howlin' Rain, High on Fire, The Black Crowes, Kvelertak, Cathedral, Astra, Earthless, Enslaved, and Windhand among many others. His influences include diverse artists and styles ranging from comic and fantasy art to graphic design and classic illustration. Roper has cited some primary influences to be Roger Dean, Frank Frazetta, Vaughn Bode, Bernie Wrightson, Greg Irons, Mike Ploog, William Stout, and Alan Lee.

He was a contributing artist to the highly regarded and cutting-edge Arthur Magazine during the mid 2000s. Arik has also designed hand-made screen-printed posters for a pantheon of concerts and events including Sound on Sound Fest, Roadburn Festival, Deserfest, Sonic Blast, Moments Arts Festival, and Desert Daze Festival. Other notable work includes art for the rpg game Torchbearer and background art for Ozzy Osbourne's animated video Patient No. 9

Roper's work encompasses a spectrum of visual styles, including graphic black-and-white illustration, lettering and logo design, abstract psychedelic color and landscapes based compositions. His art is frequently inspired by his interest in mythology, consciousness, psychology, religion and other timeless subjects. Roper mixes the light and the dark within his art to reveal imagery characterized by highly detailed compositions and repeated symbolism and imagery.

His book, Mushroom Magick (Abrams, 2009), is a vividly surreal collection of exotic fungal species from around the world. His art has also appeared in books such as De Gotham City a Metropolis by French Paper Art Club, Juxtapoz New Contemporaries, and Revisionaries: A Decade of Art in Tokion, Appendix N, and Taschen's Plant Magick. His collected art book Vision of the Hawk: The Art of Arik Moonhawk Roper was published by Strange Attractor Press in 2023.

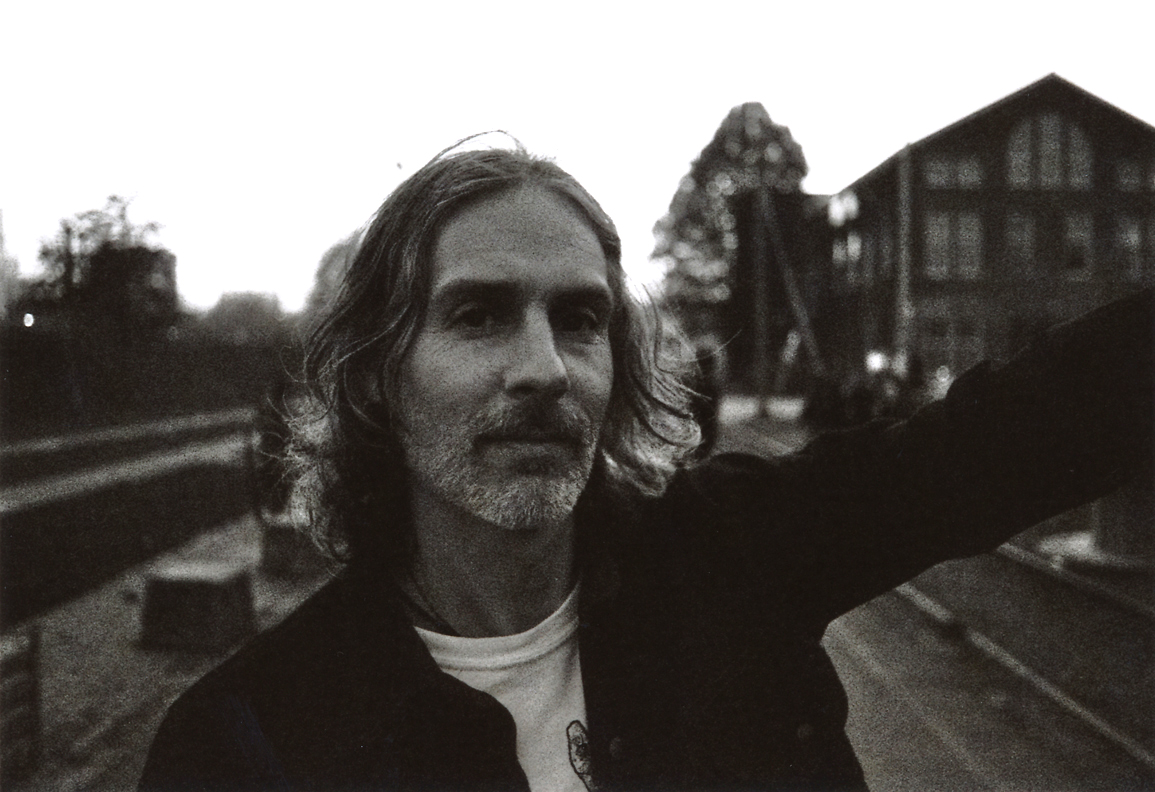
Arik Roper in Tilburg, Netherlands in 2018

Some clients include: Penguin Books, Wizards of the Coast, Warner Bros Animation, Sony Records, Magnolia Pictures, Waxwork Records, Columbia Records, Southern Lord Records, Burton Snowboards, Creature Skateboards and many more.
