= Leagues Beneath =

Single by Sleep
- Released: May 23, 2018
- Genre: Doom metal; stoner metal
- Length: 16:44
- Label: Williams Street; Third Man
- Songwriters: Al Cisneros: Matt Pike; Jason Roeder

Sleep singles chronology
"The Clarity" (2014)	"Leagues Beneath" (2018)

Audio sample
- file; help

"Leagues Beneath" is a single by the American stoner doom band Sleep. The song was released for free digitally on May 23, 2018 through Adult Swim's 2017 singles series, marking Sleep's second entry following 2014's "The Clarity". "Leagues Beneath" was released a month after the band's 2018 return album, The Sciences, which marked Sleep's first full-length studio release in twenty years. Later in 2018, "Leagues Beneath" was released on etched vinyl through Third Man Records. This would be the band's last release with Matt Pike and Jason Roeder.

== Composition ==
Musically, "Leagues Beneath" is a long, slow epic that begins with B-tuned guitar and gradually builds by introducing new elements. Al Cisneros' vocals are not heard until nearly six minutes into the track. After the song's protracted crescendo, it concludes with a somber passage where layers strip away and give way to clean, psychedelic string sounds. Phil Witmer of Vice praised "Leagues Beneath", writing that it is "possibly bigger than anything on The Sciences", and Brock Thiessen of Exclaim! called it "sprawling" and "a total scorcher". Revolver wrote that the song is "droning, transcendental, [and] punctuated with next-level riffing." At nearly seventeen minutes, "Leagues Beneath" is the group's longest track since 1999's "Dopesmoker" and, by some metrics, constitutes an EP.

== Track listing ==
No.	Title	Length
1.	"Leagues Beneath"	16:44

== Personnel ==
Sleep

- Al Cisneros – vocals, bass
- Matt Pike – guitars
- Jason Roeder – drums
