= Advaitic Songs =

Studio album by Om
- Released: July 24, 2012
- Genre: Psychedelic rock; stoner rock; oriental doom metal
- Length: 43:49
- Language: English, Sanskrit, Arabic
- Label: Drag City

Om chronology
God Is Good (2009)	Advaitic Songs (2012)	Live (2014)

Professional ratings
Aggregate scores
Source	Rating
Metacritic	67/100
Review scores
Source	Rating
Consequence of Sound	4/5 stars
Drowned in Sound	8/10
The Guardian	4/5 stars
NME	7/10
Pitchfork	(5.2/10)

Advaitic Songs is the fifth studio album by American rock band Om, released on July 24, 2012. The album has received a generally favorable response from both fans and critics, though its reception was more mixed than past works. The album has a 67 on Metacritic, indicating "generally favorable reviews". As with Pilgrimage and God Is Good, Advaitic Songs' album cover again visits Iconography from Christianity. The cover of the album features an image of John the Baptist.

== Track listing ==
No.	Title	Length
1.	"Addis"	5:32
2.	"State of Non-return"	6:05
3.	"Gethsemane"	10:23
4.	"Sinai"	10:19
5.	"Haqq al-Yaqin"	11:24
Total length:		43:49

== Versions ==
Advaitic Songs was released on CD and, for the first time in OM's vinyl-issuing history, a deluxe 2x vinyl audiophile version pressed at 45rpm. In 2013, a cassette version was released, as was a cassette version of the band's 2009 album God Is Good.

== Personnel ==
Om

- Al Cisneros – bass, vocals, piano, percussion
- Emil Amos – drums, guitar, piano, percussion

Guest musicians

- Kate Ramsey – vocals (1)
- Jory Fankuchen – viola and violin (1, 2, 3, 5)
- Jackie Perez Gratz – cello (1, 2, 4, 5)
- Lucas Chen – additional cello (1)
- Robert Aiki Aubrey Lowe – additional vocals and tamboura (3, 4)
- Lorraine Rath – flute (5)
- Hom Nath Upadhyaya – tabla (5)

Production

- Jay Pellicci – recording engineer
- Brandon Eggleston – additional engineering
- Steve Albini – additional engineering
- Salvador Raya – additional engineering
- John Goldern – mastering
- David V. D'Andrea – illustration
