= Al Cisneros =

American musician

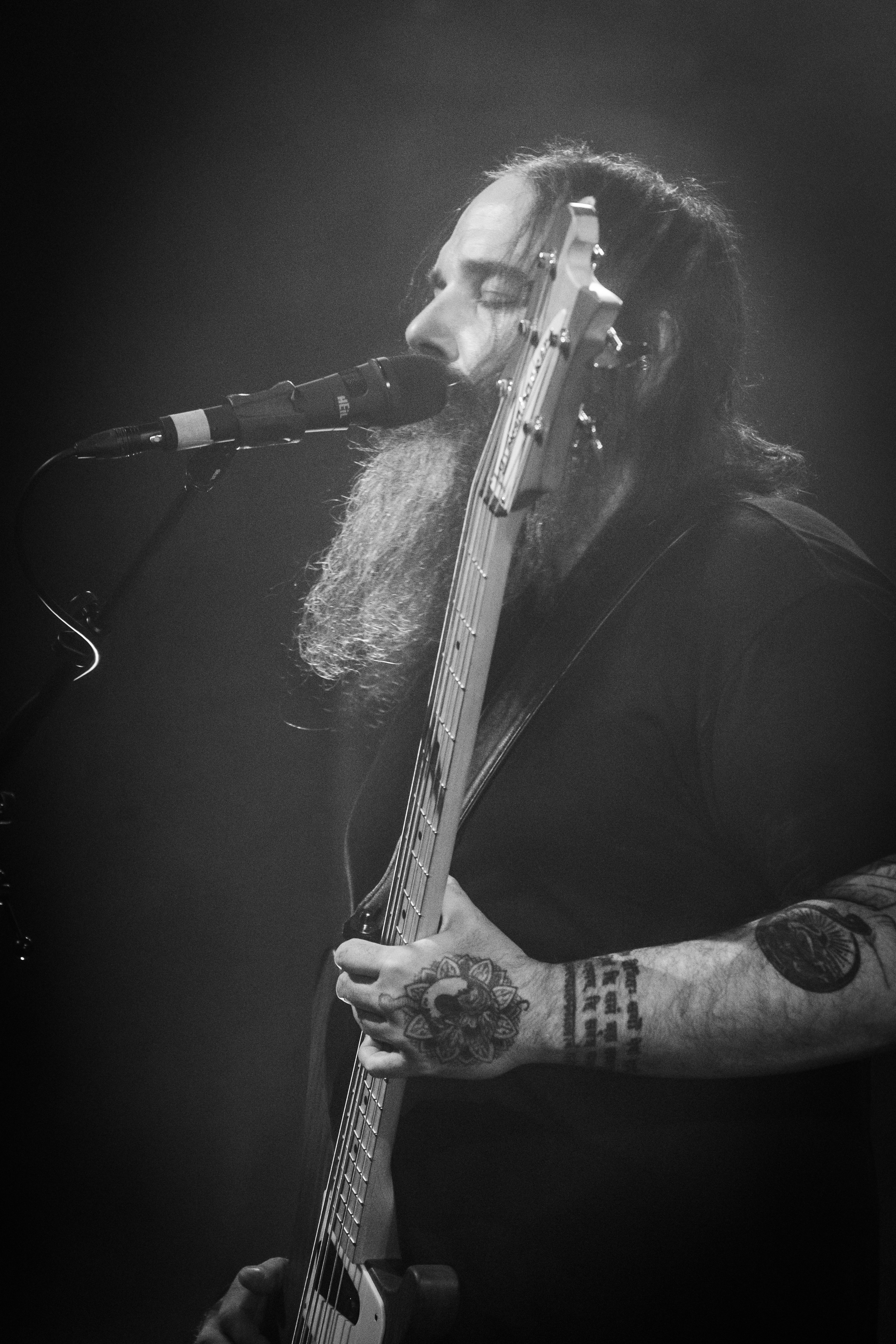
- Cisneros performing with Sleep in 2019

Background information
- Born: September 23, 1973 (age 53)
- Origin: San Jose, California, U.S.
- Genres: Stoner metal, doom metal, drone metal, dub
- Occupation: Musician
- Instruments: Bass guitar, vocals
- Years active: 1989–present
- Member of: Sleep, Om
- Formerly of: Shrinebuilder, Asbestosdeath

Alberto Romeo Cisneros (/sɪsˈnɛroʊs/; born September 23, 1973) is an American musician. He is the lead singer and bassist for stoner rock/doom metal bands Sleep and Om. He also was a member of Shrinebuilder and Asbestosdeath (the precursor to Sleep) and has put out nine releases as a solo artist.

== Career ==
Cisneros' earliest musical interests included an appreciation of Black Sabbath, in particular their first four albums.

In 1989 he formed the sludge metal band Asbestosdeath, taking up bass and vocal duties, with Chris Hakius on drums and Matt Pike and Tom Choi on guitar. Asbestosdeath released two EPs in 1990.

=== Sleep ===
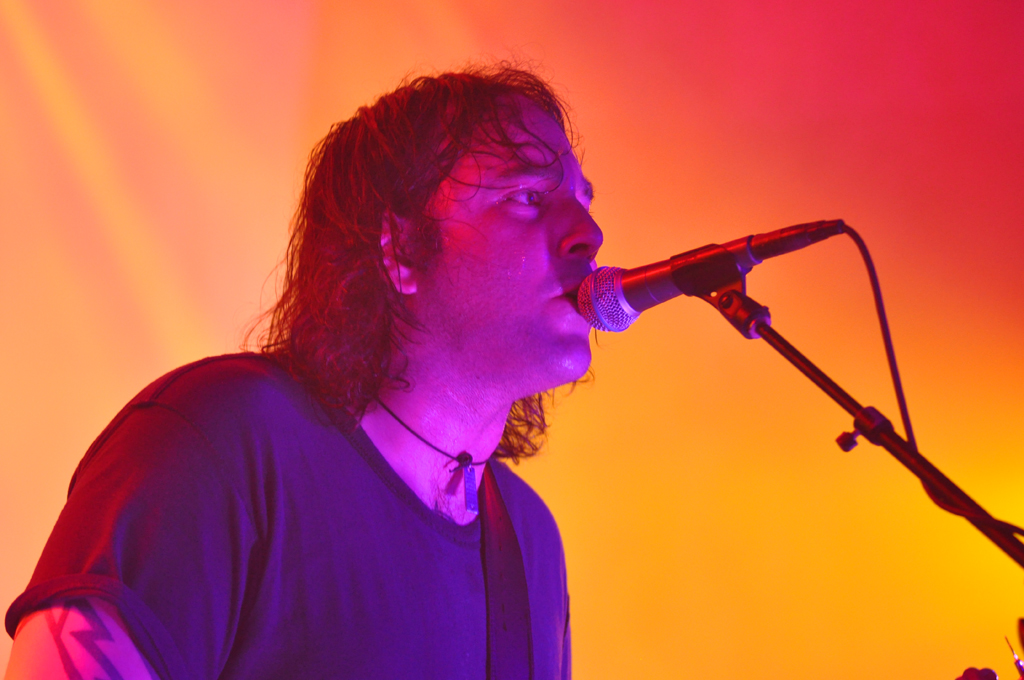
Cisneros performing with Sleep in 2010

Following Choi's departure, Cisneros, Hakius and Pike recruited Justin Marler on guitar and renamed themselves Sleep. Cisneros jokingly called himself "Luke" in the early days of Sleep, in homage to "Luke's Wall", the title of the outro section of "War Pigs".

In 1991 Sleep released their first album, Volume One. They soon gained a devoted underground following in the doom metal scene.

In 1992 they released their next album, Sleep's Holy Mountain, an influential album in the early development of stoner metal.

Between 1995 and 1998, Sleep worked extensively on their next album, Dopesmoker, a single song lasting one hour. However, their record label at the time refused to release it, and in 1998 Sleep disbanded. An abridged form was released in 1999 under the title Jerusalem. Dopesmoker in its entirety was first officially released by Tee Pee Records on April 22, 2003.

On November 26, 2012, it was reported that Sleep had recently announced their own status as a "full, reunited band".

=== Om ===
In 2003, Cisneros and Hakius decided to form their own band named Om, with Cisneros on bass and vocals and Hakius on drums. As a duo, Om released the albums Variations on a Theme in 2005, Conference of the Birds in 2006, and Pilgrimage in 2007.

In January 2008, Hakius decided to leave the band and was replaced by Emil Amos on drums. Since then, Om has released the two full-length studio albums God Is Good and Advaitic Songs on the Drag City label, a 7" for Sub Pop entitled Gebel Barkal, and the live vinyl-only LP Conference Live on Important Records.

Om's 2012 tour for the Advaitic Songs album included Robert Lowe on backing vocals, guitar, synthesizer and tambura. Lowe had previously appeared on vocals and tambura on God Is Good.

=== Solo ===
In December 2012, Cisneros released his first solo record Dismas on the band's own Sinai imprint, following the religious tones themed in OM but with more of a dub approach. A second solo record Teresa of Avila followed in March 2013. A 10" EP featuring two longer songs, "Ark Procession" and "Jericho", was also released in 2013. In January 2014 a 12" EP featuring five songs was released and in October 2014 a 7" featuring two songs and artwork by David V. D'Andrea was released by Samaritan Press. Another 7" on the Sinai imprint followed the next month under the title "Lantern of the Soul." Another spate of solo releases commenced in 2020, now more heavily influenced by reggae sounds and dub-oriented production techniques. These included, notably, the 2026 12-inch single "Dragonaut Dub," which saw Cisneros revisiting a signature Sleep song, "Dragonaut," this time rendering it in a dubwise style.

== Discography ==
=== With Asbestosdeath ===
- 1990 – Dejection
- 1990 – Unclean

=== With Sleep ===
- 1991 – Volume One
- 1992 – Volume Two
- 1992 – Sleep's Holy Mountain
- 1999 – Jerusalem
- 2003 – Dopesmoker
- 2014 – "The Clarity"
- 2018 – The Sciences
- 2018 – "Leagues Beneath"
- 2019 – "Live at Third Man Records"
- 2026 – Hempispheres

=== With Om ===
- 2005 – Variations on a Theme
- 2006 – Conference of the Birds
- 2006 – Bedouin's Vigil (Split 7" with Six Organs of Admittance)
- 2006 – Inerrant Rays of Infallible Sun (Split EP with Current 93)
- 2007 – Pilgrimage
- 2008 – Live at Jerusalem
- 2008 – Gebel Barkal
- 2009 – Conference Live
- 2009 – God Is Good
- 2012 – Advaitic Songs
- 2014 – Live
- 2019 – BBC Radio 1

=== With Shrinebuilder ===
- 2009 – Shrinebuilder

=== With Melvins ===
- 2018 – Sabbath (EP)

=== With The Holy Mountain Orchestra ===
- 2025 – “Song for JW”

=== Solo ===
- 2012 – "Dismas" 7" (Sinai)
- 2013 – "Teresa of Avila" / "Levitation Dub" 7" (Sinai)
- 2013 – "Ark Procession" / "Jericho" 10" (Drag City)
- 2014 – "Toward Nazareth" / "Indica Field" / "Harvester Dub" / "Yerushaláyim" / "Version" 12" (Drag City)
- 2014 – "Empty Tomb" / "Sepulcher Dub" 7" (Samaritan Press)
- 2014 – "Lantern of the Soul" / "Untitled" 7" (Sinai)
- 2020 – "Apple Pipe" / "No Tobacco" 7" (Zam Zam)
- 2022 – Sinai Dub Box (2012-2022) (Sinai)
- 2022 – "Suicide Of Judas" / "Akeldama" digital single (Sinai)
- 2023 – "Al Cisneros vs The Bug - Rosin 12" (Pressure)
- 2025 – "Pillar Of Fire" / "Capernaum" 10" (w/ David Eugene Edwards) (Drag City)
- 2026 – "Dragonaut Dub" / "Song for Dave Sweetapple" / "Sweetapple Dub" 12" (Eremite)

=== Appears on ===
- 2006 – Six Organs of Admittance – "River of Transfiguration," The Sun Awakens (Drag City)
- 2009 – Harvestman – "The Hawk of Achill," In a Dark Tongue (Neurot)
- 2024 – Harvestman – "Psilosynth" and "Psilosynth (Harvest Dub)," Triptych: Part One (Neurot)
- 2024 – Harvestman – "The Hag Of Beara vs The Poet" and "The Hag Of Beara vs The Poet (Forest Dub)," Triptych: Part Two (Neurot)

== Equipment ==
Basses

- Rickenbacker 4003AC (Al Cisneros Signature model)
- Rickenbacker 4420
- Rickenbacker 4080/6
- Rickenbacker 4003
- Rickenbacker 4003S5
- Rickenbacker 4004
- Rickenbacker 4003W

Amplification

- Ampeg SVT-VR
- Orange Dual Dark 100
- Ampeg SVT 810
- Orange 2x12, 4x12

Effects

- Peterson Strobe Tuner
- Chicago Iron Tychobrahe Parachute Wah
- Orange Bax Bangeetar Guitar Pre-EQ
- DOD Preamp Overdrive 250 (modified)
- Electro-Harmonix Pog 2
- Mu-Tron Bi-Phase
