= The Sciences (album) =

Studio album by Sleep
- Released: April 20, 2018
- Studio: Sharkbite (Oakland, California)
- Genres: Doom metal, stoner metal, space rock
- Length: 53:00
- Label: Third Man
- Producer: Sleep

Sleep chronology
Dopesmoker (2003)	The Sciences (2018)	Hempispheres (2026)

Limited vinyl cover

The Sciences is the fourth studio album by American stoner/doom metal band Sleep. The album was released with little warning on April 20, 2018, through Third Man Records. It was the band's first full-length album since Dopesmoker (2003).

Just a month after the release of The Sciences, Sleep released the non-album song "Leagues Beneath" through Adult Swim's 2018 weekly single series. It is the band's last album with both Matt Pike and Jason Roeder.

== Background and composition ==
In 2009, Sleep re-formed and played a handful of shows. "The Clarity", the band's first new studio material since 2003's Dopesmoker, was released in 2014. In an interview with NPR Music about the release of that single, the band wrote, "Sleep has been sporadically writing riffs for a while now [...] There is no preconceived idea of what the new material should be. It would be an amalgamated effort of decades of riff immersion." In 2017, the band released a morse code message on their website confirming that a new album was nearing completion. During a break in a North American tour, The Sciences was released on April 20, 2018.

Musically, The Sciences is a stoner metal album built upon the distorted, downtuned, and slow bass of Al Cisneros playing alongside the similarly low guitar of Matt Pike. Repetition of riffs and passages is employed, working to create a "hypnotic state" supplemented by Cisneros' vocals, which are similarly meditative to his work on the band Om. In keeping with Sleep's aesthetic, much of the lyrics have to do with marijuana and cannabinoids and are delivered in a reverential, "quasi-religious" fashion. The song "Marijuanaut's Theme", which Pitchfork cited as the best track of the album, begins with the sound of Cisneros using a bong. The track "Sonic Titan" had been performed by the band in the 1990s prior to Dopesmoker's release; a live recording was included as a bonus track on Tee Pee Records' 2003 reissue of that album.

Along with the cannabis references, The Sciences makes multiple allusions to Birmingham heavy metal pioneers Black Sabbath, whose sound inspired the band. Tony Iommi is referenced frequently in the lyrics, and the song "Giza Butler" is a play on the Egyptian city of Giza and the name of Black Sabbath's bassist, Geezer Butler. Later in "Giza Butler", references are made to several things in Frank Herbert's 1965 novel Dune, including the gom jabbar (parodied as "bong jabbar"), the Kwisatz Haderach (parodied as "Kiefsatz Hasherach") and the Muad'Dib (parodied as "Muad'Doob").

== Release ==
The Sciences first appeared as a listing on streaming websites on April 19, 2018. It was released a day later on April 20, 2018, a date significant in cannabis culture. The album was made available as a limited vinyl in two colors and for streaming on iTunes and Spotify. It debuted at number 49 on the Billboard 200, and was Sleep's first album to chart in the United States.

=== Critical reception ===
Professional ratings
Aggregate scores
Source	Rating
Metacritic	84/100
Review scores
Source	Rating
AllMusic	4.5/5 stars
Consequence of Sound	B+
Exclaim!	9/10
Metal Injection	10/10
Metal Storm	9.0/10
Mojo	4/5 stars
Pitchfork	8.4/10
Rolling Stone	4/5 stars
Tiny Mix Tapes	4/5 stars

The Sciences was met with critical acclaim. The album received an average score of 84/100 from 11 reviews on Metacritic, indicating "universal acclaim". In the review for AllMusic, Mark Deming compared the album to the band's previous release, claiming that "The Sciences may not be as daring and ambitious as Dopesmoker, but it finds Sleep working at the top of their game in the studio, and their resinous howl is still a weird marvel to behold." Dan Franklin of The Quietus praised The Sciences, writing, "Sleep present an alternative pathway for the hyper-technological age. Elon Musk's battery-powered ascent to the stars and colonisation of Mars be damned, perhaps we just want to get high and drift on a spacewalk. Sleep have finally delivered the soundtrack." Writing for Exclaim!, Trystan MacDonald awarded the album a nine out of ten, suggesting that it is either as good as or better than Dopesmoker. Fred Pessaro of Revolver lauded the album, calling it "the best stoner-doom record we've heard in a long time."

Writing for Metal Injection, Greg Kennelty said, "The Sciences is the first Sleep album since 2003's Dopesmoker and is very much worth the wait, if not heavier than expected." Cody Davis of the same publication gave the album a perfect score. Zoe Camp of Spin praised the album, especially highlighting Pike's guitar riffs as some of the band's best. Camp concluded her review by writing that "with The Sciences, Sleep have given stoner-metal acolytes a bonafide miracle." Writing for Pitchfork, Grayson Haver Currin considered the album an ideal comeback for Sleep, saying that the six songs "burn perfectly". Langdon Hickman of Consequence of Sound wrote that The Sciences "confirms why they are considered the greatest stoner doom band of all time, one of doom metal's greatest treasures, one of metal’s biggest crossover acts in the broader underground musical world, and one of the greatest heavy rock bands to roam the planet." Billboard's Ron Hart said The Sciences "truly is the band’s best album yet".

=== Accolades ===
Year	Publication	Accolade	Rank	Ref.
2018	Consequence of Sound	"Top 25 Metal + Hard Rock Albums of 2018"	6	
2018	Decibel	"Decibel's Top 40 Albums of 2018"	22	
2018	Exclaim!	"Exclaim!'s Top 10 Metal and Hardcore Albums"	2	
2018	Loudwire	"The 30 Best Metal Albums of 2018"	1	
2018	PopMatters	"The Best Metal of 2018"	6	
2018	Revolver	"30 Best Albums of 2018"	5	
2018	Rolling Stone	"20 Best Metal Albums of 2018"	1	
2018	Vulture	"The 15 Best Albums of 2018"	9	

== Track listing ==
All music written, composed, and produced by Sleep.

No.	Title	Length
1.	"The Sciences" (instrumental)	3:04
2.	"Marijuanaut's Theme"	6:40
3.	"Sonic Titan"	12:27
4.	"Giza Butler"	10:03
5.	"Antarcticans Thawed"	14:23
6.	"The Botanist" (instrumental)	6:27
Total length:		53:00

Notes

- The songs "Sonic Titan" and "Antarcticans Thawed" were both originally written during the Dopesmoker sessions.
- Original 2018 releases of The Sciences featured "Antarcticans Thawed" before "Giza Butler" in the track listing.

== Personnel ==
Credits adapted from liner notes.

Sleep

- Al Cisneros – vocals, bass, water pipe
- Matt Pike – guitar
- Jason Roeder – drums

Additional personnel

- Sleep – production
- Noah Landis – engineering, mixing
- Christopher Acevado – photography
- Josh Graham – layout
- Bob Weston – mastering

== Charts ==
Chart (2018)	Peak position
Belgian Albums (Ultratop Flanders)	85
Belgian Albums (Ultratop Wallonia)	145
Dutch Albums (Album Top 100)	165
German Albums (Offizielle Top 100)	63
New Zealand Heatseeker Albums (RMNZ)	10
Scottish Albums (Official Charts)	93
US Billboard 200	49
US Top Rock Albums (Billboard)	7
US Top Hard Rock Albums (Billboard)	2
