= Jerusalem and Dopesmoker =

- Dopesmoker (2003) album cover

Studio album by Sleep
- Released: 1999^{^{‡}} April 22, 2003^{^{†}}
- Recorded: 1994
- Studio: Record Two Studio in Comptche, California
- Genres: Doom metal; stoner metal
- Length: 52:08^{^{‡}} 73:07^{^{†}} 75:09^{^{₸}}
- Labels: Rise Above/The Music Cartel^{^{‡}} Tee Pee^{^{†}}
- Producers: Billy Anderson^{^{†}}, Sleep

Sleep chronology
Sleep's Holy Mountain (1992)	''Jerusalem and Dopesmoker'' (1999/2003)	The Sciences (2018)

Reissue cover
- Dopesmoker (2012) album cover

Jerusalem
- Jerusalem (1999) album cover

Jerusalem and Dopesmoker are two versions of the third studio album by the American stoner doom band Sleep. The former title was released in 1999 by The Music Cartel in a version the band disliked, and the latter was released by Tee Pee Records in 2003 as the band intended.

The musical performance that appears on Dopesmoker was recorded live to tape over the summer of 1994, following Sleep’s U.S. tour. When recording had completed, London Records was unhappy with the finished product and refused to release it, leading to Sleep's disbandment and the album surfacing on bootlegs and unauthorized indie releases in subsequent years. All versions of the album received very positive reception from music critics, who described it as a high-water mark in both the stoner metal and doom metal genres.

== Production ==
After positive reviews from the heavy metal press and the release of the album Sleep's Holy Mountain (1992) on Earache Records, Sleep's label announced that they would release their follow-up record. Sleep had been touring in Europe with Cathedral and in the United States with Nik Turner's version of Hawkwind in support of Sleep's Holy Mountain when the group felt they had to write new material. The new album was going to be an hour-long song. This song was written and practiced at sound checks, motel rooms and in friends' houses. Matt Pike said the songwriting process was long and that they were "working on [the song] for like four years. We also had two other songs that were working on that were really long, too—like 15 and 20 minutes. But we never recorded them." Al Cisneros stated that smoking cannabis was important to the song's creative process: "I was really dependent on the space I got into when I was using it, and some of the lyrics are about that...The line, 'Drop out of life [with bong in hand],' was kind of a creed at that point." The song was originally known and performed live under the title "Dopesmoker". After their tour, the group began to be interested in a Middle Eastern desert theme which led to Sleep referring to the song as "Jerusalem" during later practice sessions.

Cisneros said that there was "about a year and half of legal wrangling between their managers and lawyers at Earache" and that Earache owner Digby Pearson "waited to make the most prime conditions for himself before he let [Sleep's] contract [go]." Sleep were in talks with both London Records and Elektra Records to release their next album. They chose to sign to London, as they were promised complete artistic freedom and more money, and since the label did not have any metal bands, Sleep felt they would receive special treatment. The members of Sleep were poor, and used the majority of money they received from London Records to cover for the debt they were in at that time.

The song was recorded at Record Two Studio in Comptche, California. While recording the song, it began to develop differently from the original vision. Pike stated that the "song was getting slower and slower and then it got weird. We started tripping out and second guessing ourselves." Recording the album was difficult. Pike recalled that "there was so much to memorize for that album, and we had to do it in like three different sections because a reel-to-reel only holds 22 minutes. It was really cool, but it was one of the hardest things I've ever done in my life." Sleep were in the studio for one month then went home to rehearse and returned for another month. Pike noted that they ended up with two or three different versions of the song.

Part of the song's signature sound is thanks to custom-built GREEN Matamp GT120 MV amplifiers designed to be so loud, no one from the band was capable of going into the same room as them. More than half a dozen microphones were used to pick up the sound from the amps.

== Release ==
Within a few weeks of signing with London, the A&R member who was negotiating with Sleep had been transferred and replaced. After sending the finished album to London Records, the label told Sleep that they were not going to release the album in its current format. London Records had David Sardy remix the album but the label was still confused as to what to do with it. Sleep refused to have the album released in any edited form which led to a deadlock between London and the band. The members of Sleep had mixed feelings whether the album should have been released in general. Cisneros felt it should not have been released, while Pike was content with its release, saying "We did all the work so why leave it sitting around?"

By 2009, there had been four versions of the album released: a rare London Records promotional disc, a bootleg with cover art by Arik Roper, the Rise Above/Music Cartel Records album, and a release by Tee Pee Records. The Rise Above/Music Cartel release was an unauthorized edited version, released in 1999 under the title Jerusalem. Jerusalem runs at 52 minutes and is a single composition split into six identically named tracks. The version of the album titled Dopesmoker was released on April 22, 2003, by Tee Pee Records on compact disc and vinyl with a 63-minute running time. Cisneros spoke most positively about the 2003 Dopesmoker release, saying "I don't think the Dopesmoker thing is the exact version that we submitted, but that's the closest one that's come out of the four. If I had to pick a favorite, that would be it." Parts of the song were used in the film Broken Flowers by Jim Jarmusch. Jarmusch stated that he was a fan of Sleep and listed them along with Earth and Sunn O))) as an influence for creating the film: "I love these kind of visual landscapes they make, and they really inspired things for me for my film The Limits of Control".

In March 2012, Southern Lord Records announced plans for a deluxe reissue of the album, adding of the pending release that "The audio is clearer, louder, and at last brings a true representation of Sleep's hour-plus Weedian chronicle". The reissue features new artwork by the band's artist Arik Roper, a recording mastered from the original studio tapes by From Ashes Rise guitarist Brad Boatright, and a live version of the song "Holy Mountain", recorded at the I-Beam in San Francisco in 1994. This version of the album reached number 14 on the Top Heatseekers chart.

On August 22, 2022, Third Man Records announced the release of a remastered version of Dopesmoker on music streaming services on August 26, 2022, featuring "Hot Lava Man", a track that hadn't been released digitally before. Along with this digital release, a vinyl reissue of the album released on December 9, 2022, as well as a deluxe "Weedian High-Fi" vinyl pressed with "authentic cannabis leaves" which is only available to purchase at Third Man's Detroit storefront.

== Critical reception ==
Professional ratings
Aggregate scores
Source	Rating
Metacritic	94/100^{^{₸}}
Review scores
Source	Rating
AllMusic	^{^{‡}}^{^{†}}
Collector's Guide to Heavy Metal	7/10
Consequence of Sound	3.5/5 stars
Decibel	(favorable)
Exclaim!	(favorable)
Mojo	5/5 stars
Pitchfork	8.5/10
Spin	(favorable)
Stylus Magazine	(favorable)

Both Dopesmoker and early releases of the album received positive reviews from the music press. In the December 2000 issue of Spin, the album was referred to as "brilliant" and as a "stoner touchstone". CMJ New Music Monthly wrote positively about the song, saying that the "monotony rarely becomes tedious, because Al Cisneros and company are unpredictable and sensual in their drug-induced pounding of early Sabbath terrain." Chicago Tribune critic Greg Kot described "Jerusalem" as both "a study in uber-heaviness" and "a spacious dub-metal opus" that resembled a collaboration between Black Sabbath and Bob Marley. Online music database AllMusic gave the Jerusalem album four stars out of five stating that "Either version is worth investigating for adventurous metal enthusiasts, but Dopesmoker is clearly the final and definitive presentation of this work". In 2006, the extreme metal magazine Decibel included the album in their hall of fame of "extreme metal masterpieces".

The album continued to receive praise after the release of Dopesmoker. Eduardo Rivadavia of online music database AllMusic gave the album four and a half stars out of five stating "Dopesmoker is [...] an instant doom metal classic—some might even say a masterpiece". The British music magazine Mojo gave the album a rating of five out of five stars proclaiming that Dopesmoker is "A benchmark by which all that dares call itself stoner rock must surely be judged." Exclaim! praised Dopesmoker's production value and noted that the album was an "ultimately better version of 1999's stoner opus Jerusalem." Stylus Magazine's Stewart Voegtlin defined Dopesmoker as "a 60-minute song about the spliff, a monstrous rock ode to stinky buds". Voegtlin pointed out that London Records' refusal to "share Sleep's affection or vision, [led the band to] disbanding in disgust. Matt Pike went on to form High on Fire; Al Cisneros and Chris Hakius contemplate the universe's navel with Om." A New York Times critic wrote: "What seems disorienting and monochromatic at first grows richer and more rewarding upon repeated exposure. It's like a Mark Rothko painting hitting you over the head with a bag of hammers."

The 2012 Southern Lord Records re-issue was also praised. On Metacritic, it has a score of 94 out of 100, based on 9 reviews. Exclaim! noted that this issue was "cleaner and more powerful, the guitars sound heavier, with a much larger presence, and the mesmerizing complexity of the track has been reinvigorated." Pitchfork Media gave the album an 8.5 out of 10 and listed it as one of "the best new reissues" noting that "It's an hour of adventure and momentum, where the lumber and the repetition somehow always push ahead." Consequence of Sound gave the album three and a half stars out of five, stating that "It's not for everybody, certainly; all but the biggest potheads/metalheads may burn out after so much grinding. It's no showcase for songwriting, either, but it makes up for that with heady atmosphere."

== Track listings ==
All songs written by Sleep.

Jerusalem

No.	Title	Length
1.	"Jerusalem"	52:08

Dopesmoker (Tee Pee issue)

No.	Title	Length
1.	"Dopesmoker"	63:31
2.	"Sonic Titan" (live)	9:36
Total length:		73:07

Dopesmoker (Southern Lord reissue)

No.	Title	Length
1.	"Dopesmoker"	63:34
2.	"Holy Mountain" (live)	11:35
3.	"Sonic Titan" (live; vinyl, cassette and Japan CD only)	9:17
Total length:		84:26

Dopesmoker (Third Man reissue)

No.	Title	Length
1.	"Dopesmoker"	63:34
2.	"Hot Lava Man"	8:25
3.	"Dopesmoker Part 1 Alternate Take" (deluxe edition only)	11:51
4.	"Alternate Solo Take 2" (deluxe edition only)	3:27
5.	"Dopesmoker I-Beam San Francisco 5–28–94" (deluxe edition only)	18:14
6.	"Dopesmoker (Cont'd) I-Beam San Francisco 5–28–94" (deluxe edition only)	8:43
7.	"Dopesmoker (Radio)" (deluxe edition only)	4:44
8.	"Proceeds the Weedian" (deluxe edition only)	4:44
Total length:		71:59 (123:42)

== Personnel ==
Sleep

- Al Cisneros – vocals, bass
- Matt Pike – guitar
- Chris Hakius – drums

Jerusalem

- Sleep – producer
- Philo Hayward – assistant engineering
- Doug Henderson – assistant engineering
- Fred Kervorkian – editing
- Adam Muñoz – assistant engineering

Dopesmoker (2003 Tee Pee issue)

- Sleep – producer, liner notes
- Billy Anderson – producer, engineering
- Mark Keaton – mastering
- Arik Roper – art direction
- Doug Ebright – artwork

Dopesmoker (2012 Southern Lord reissue)

- Sleep – producer
- Billy Anderson – producer, engineering
- Brad Boatright – remastering
- Arik Roper – artwork

Dopesmoker (2022 Third Man reissue)

- Billy Anderson – recording (tracks 1–4), mixing (tracks 1, 2)
- Brandon Eggleston – mixing (tracks 3, 4), additional engineering (tracks 3, 4)
- Zak Riles – additional engineering (tracks 2, 5, 6)
- Matthew Tobias – additional engineering (tracks 3, 4)
- Carl Saff – mastering
- Arik Roper – artwork

== See also ==
- 1999 in music
- 2003 in music
- List of songs about Jerusalem

== Notes ==
- ^{†} This refers to the Dopesmoker (2003) release of the album.
- ^{₸} This refers to the Dopesmoker (2012) reissue release of the album.
- ^{‡} This refers to the Jerusalem (1999) release of the album.
