= Hempispheres =

Studio album by Sleep
- Released: September 3, 2026
- Genres: Doom metal; stoner metal; space rock
- Length: 38:05
- Label: Third Man

Sleep chronology
The Sciences (2018)	Hempispheres (2026)

Singles from Hempispheres
- 1. "Have Spacesuit Will Travel (4:20 Flexi Edit)" Released: June 18, 2026; 2. "The Morrisist" Released: August 5, 2026

Hempispheres is the fifth studio album by the American stoner doom metal band Sleep. The album was digitally released on September 3, 2026, with physical copies set to be released on October 30, 2026, through Third Man Records. The album was preceded by the single "Have Spacesuit Will Travel (4:20 Flexi Edit)" that was released in June 2026 alongside a comic book written by Al Cisneros and illustrated by Dave Kloc and Arik Roper.

== Background ==
The album marks the first release of Sleep's new formation, consisting of vocalist Al Cisneros, guitarist Bubba Dupree and drummer Dale Crover, replacing Matt Pike and Jason Roeder.

Musically, the album maintains a reverence for Black Sabbath and Tony Iommi, while drawing on sonic traits evocative of acid blues and proto-metal from bands such as Cactus, Deep Purple and Hawkwind.

== Critical reception ==
Any Decent Music gave the album a weighted average score of 6.1 out of 10 from five critic scores. According to Metacritic, it received "generally favorable" reviews based on a weighted average score of 62 out of 100 from six critic scores.

== Track listing ==
All tracks are written by Al Cisneros, Dale Crover, and Bubba Dupree.

No.	Title	Length
1.	"Have Spacesuit Will Travel"	7:22
2.	"The Morrisist"	4:43
3.	"Hempispheres"	7:57
4.	"Arrival of the Industry Ships"	11:11
5.	"Whole Wheat Mountain / Well Baked"	6:52
Total length:		38:05

== Personnel ==
Credits are adapted from Tidal and Stereogum.

=== Sleep ===
- Al Cisneros – Bass, Vocals, Moog Synthesizer
- Dale Crover – Drums, Percussion, Rickenbacker Steel String Console
- Bubba Dupree – Guitars

=== Production ===
- Toshi Kasai – engineering
- JJ Golden – mastering

=== Artwork ===
- cover illustration by Dan McCarthy

== Charts ==
Chart performance for Hempispheres
Chart (2026)	Peak position
French Rock & Metal Albums (SNEP)	77
Scottish Albums (Official Charts)	62
UK Albums Sales (Official Charts)	45
UK Independent Albums (Official Charts)	20
UK Rock & Metal Albums (Official Charts)	8
US Top Album Sales (Billboard)	28
