= 90 Day Men =

American progressive rock band

- Also known as: The 90 Day Men
- Origin: St. Louis, Missouri, U.S.
- Genres: Math rock, progressive rock, experimental rock
- Years active: 1995–2006; 2024–present
- Labels: Southern; Numero Group
- Past members: Brian Case; Cayce Key; Andy Lansangan; Robert Lowe; Chandler McWilliams
- Website: web.archive.org/web/20051119090534/http://www.90daymen.com/

90 Day Men is an American progressive rock band formed in 1995 in St. Louis, Missouri, United States, and later based in Chicago, Illinois. Their name is a slang term used by police officers to refer to prison inmates who are due to undergo psychiatric examination.

== History ==
The group began as an early post-hardcore band, similar to Louisville, Kentucky groups such as Slint and June of 44. Formed as a trio in 1995 by Brian Case, Cayce Key and Chandler McWilliams, they released its first 7" single in 1996, "Taking Apart the Vessel".

Robert Lowe joined the group in 1997 on trumpet and vocals but later moved to bass guitar when McWilliams departed. Their first recording with this line-up was the 7" single, "If You Can Bake a Cake, You Can Build a Bomb", in 1997, followed by an EP on Temporary Residence in 1998. In late 1998, they signed with Southern Records, who released their first full-length album, titled (It (Is) It) Critical Band, in 2000. By this time, the keyboard player Andy Lansangan had joined the group. Two further LPs followed, To Everybody in 2002 and Panda Park in 2004, which was the subject of significant critical acclaim. The band formally disbanded in 2005 and played their last show together in 2006.

The same year, Lowe embarked a solo project called Lichens, and released solo material under the name Robert A. A. Lowe.

The guitarist, Brian Case, played in the Chicago garage rock band The Ponys, Disappears, and currently in a project called FACS.

As of 2021, drummer Cayce Key plays in Bloodiest.

In 2022, The Numero Group announced that it had procured rights to the back catalog from Southern, and began reissuing the band's discography onto streaming services.

On January 19, 2024, Numero released We Blame Chicago, a compilation featuring the band's three albums, various EPs and singles, and several unreleased songs, including an unreleased Peel session originally recorded in 2001. On October 9, the band announced they would be reuniting for two shows at the Empty Bottle in Chicago on December 30 and 31. On November 20, it was announced that the compilation was nominated for a Grammy in the Best Boxed or Special Limited Edition Package category, though it ultimately lost to a reissue of Mind Games by John Lennon.

== Discography ==
=== Studio albums ===
- (It (Is) It) Critical Band (Southern Records, 2000)
- To Everybody (Southern, 2002)
- Panda Park (Southern, 2004)

=== EPs ===
- Taking Apart the Vessel (self-released, 1996)
- If You Can Bake a Cake, You Can Build a Bomb (Action Boy, 1997)
- 1975–1977–1998 (Temporary Residence, 1998)
- Split with GoGoGo Airheart (Box Factory Records, 2000)
- Too Late or Too Dead (Southern, 2003)

=== Compilations ===
- We Blame Chicago (2024, Numero Group)

== Members ==
- Brian Case (guitar, vocals)
- Cayce Key (drums)
- Chandler McWilliams (bass, 1995–97)
- Robert Lowe (bass, trumpet, vocals, 1997–2005)
- Andy Lansangan (keyboards, 2001–05)
