= Conference of the Birds (Om album) =

Studio album by Om
- Released: April 17, 2006
- Recorded: 2005
- Genre: Stoner rock; stoner metal; psychedelic rock; doom metal
- Length: 33:23
- Label: Holy Mountain; Leaf Hound Records
- Producer: Om and Billy Anderson

Om chronology
Variations on a Theme (2005)	Conference of the Birds (2006)	Pilgrimage (2007)

Professional ratings
Review scores
Source	Rating
AllMusic	4/5 stars
Pitchfork Media	7.3/10
Tiny Mix Tapes	4/5 stars

Conference of the Birds is the second studio album by American rock band Om. It was released on April 17, 2006, on CD and on May 15, 2006, on vinyl, both through Holy Mountain. The album was pressed on black (2000 pressings), clear orange (500), and clear green vinyl (500). It was released on CD in Japan by Leaf Hound Records and includes a bonus track, "Bedouin's Vigil," which was originally released on the split 7-inch with Six Organs of Admittance.

== Track listing ==
- Written and arranged by Om. Copyright Om Music (ASCAP).

No.	Title	Length
1.	"At Giza"	15:55
2.	"Flight of the Eagle"	17:27
Total length:		33:23

== Personnel ==
- Al Cisneros – bass, vocals
- Chris Hakius – drums, percussion

Production

- Produced by Om and Billy Anderson
- Recorded, engineered and mixed by Billy Anderson and Kevin Lemon

== See also ==
- The Conference of the Birds
