= God Is Good (Om album) =

Studio album by Om
- Released: September 29, 2009
- Recorded: March 2009
- Studio: Electrical Audio, Chicago
- Genre: Psychedelic rock; stoner metal; doom metal; oriental
- Length: 34:11
- Label: Drag City
- Producer: Steve Albini

Om chronology
Pilgrimage (2007)	God Is Good (2009)	Advaitic Songs (2012)

Professional ratings
Aggregate scores
Source	Rating
Metacritic	72/100
Review scores
Source	Rating
BBC	mixed
Brainwashed	positive
Drowned in Sound	6/10
Pitchfork	6.0/10
PopMatters	7/10
Spin	3.5/5 stars

God Is Good is the fourth studio album by American rock band Om. It was released in 2009 on Drag City. The album was recorded at Electrical Audio by Steve Albini and is the first studio album by Om to feature new drummer Emil Amos.

== Track listing ==
No.	Title	Length
1.	"Thebes"	19:09
2.	"Meditation Is the Practice of Death"	6:52
3.	"Cremation Ghat" I. "Cremation Ghat I" (3:12) II. "Cremation Ghat II" (4:58)"	8:10
Total length:		34:11

== Personnel ==
Om

- Emil Amos – drums, percussion
- Al Cisneros – bass guitar, vocals

Additional musicians

- Robert Aiki Aubrey Lowe – tamboura (1, 4), additional vocals (3)
- Lorraine Rath – flute (2)
- Jackie Perez Gratz – cello (3)
