= Chris Hakius =

American drummer

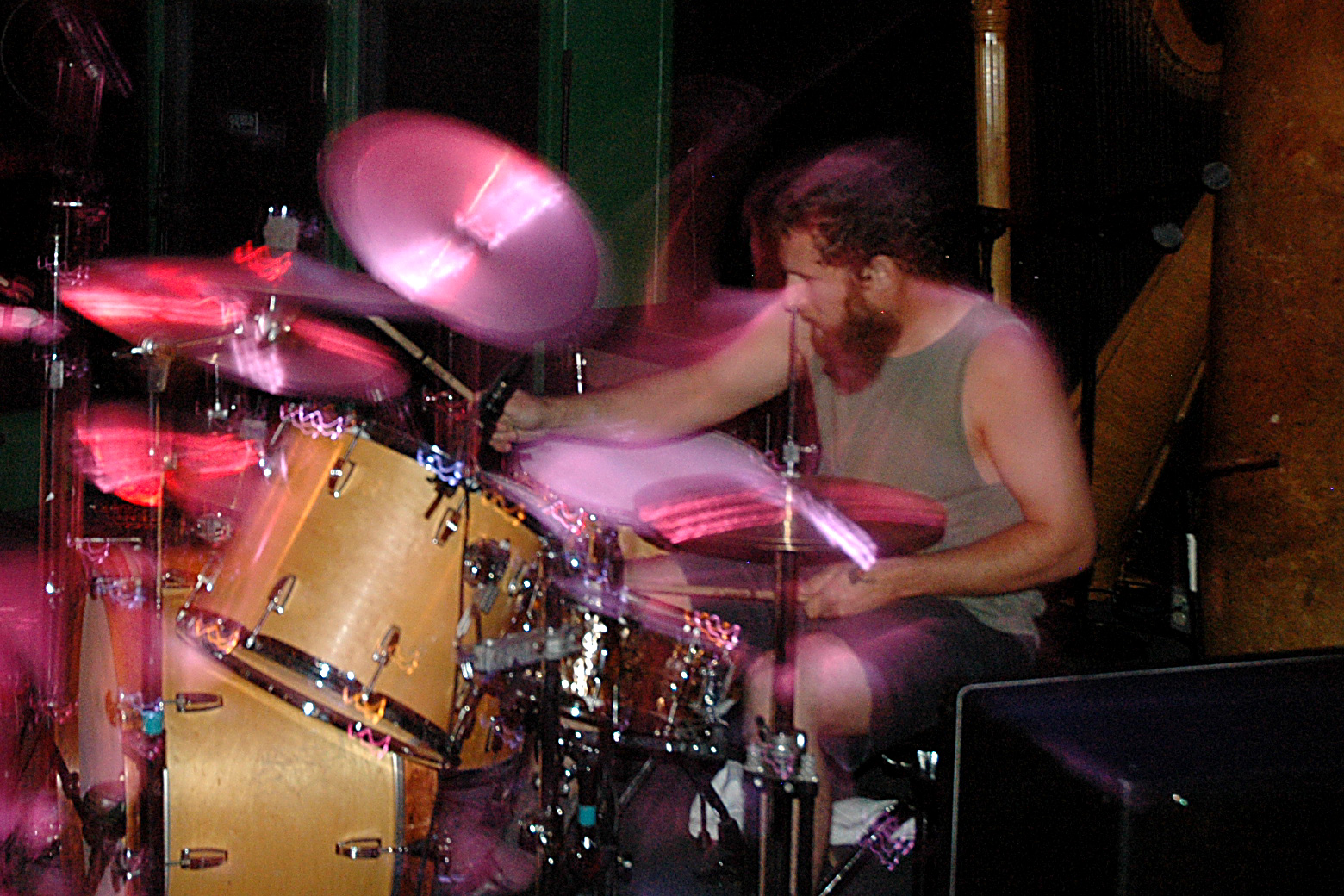

Background information
- Born: Christopher Louis Hakius; December 14, 1971 (age 54)
- Origin: San Jose, California, U.S.
- Genres: Stoner rock, doom metal
- Occupation: Musician
- Instrument: Drums
- Years active: 1989–2009

Christopher Louis Hakius (born December 14, 1971) is an American retired rock drummer best known for his work in Om and Sleep.

Around 1990, Hakius was in Asbestosdeath along with Al Cisneros and Matt Pike. Asbestosdeath broke up and the three would form Sleep. Hakius was Sleep's drummer from 1990 to its split in 1998. After Sleep's break up, he played drums in The Sabians with former Sleep member Justin Marler. They recorded two albums in 2002 and 2003.

Hakius played drums in Om from its beginning in 2003 until his departure on January 31, 2009. His final live performances were with Sleep in 2009 at the ATP reunion show. He has since retired from music to raise a family.

== Discography ==
- 1990 – Dejection (Asbestosdeath)
- 1990 – Unclean (Asbestosdeath)
- 1991 – Volume One (Sleep)
- 1992 – Volume Two (Sleep)
- 1993 – Sleep's Holy Mountain (Sleep)
- 1999 – Jerusalem (Sleep)
- 2002 – Beauty for Ashes (The Sabians)
- 2003 – Shiver (The Sabians)
- 2003 – Dopesmoker (Sleep)
- 2005 – Variations on a Theme (Om)
- 2006 – Conference of the Birds (Om)
- 2006 – Bedouin's Vigil (Om)
- 2006 – Rays of the Sun / To the Shrinebuilder (Om)
- 2007 – Pilgrimage (Om)
- 2008 – Live at Jerusalem (Om)
