= Pilgrimage (Om album) =

Studio album by Om
- Released: October 2, 2007
- Recorded: 2007
- Genre: Stoner rock; stoner metal; psychedelic rock; doom metal
- Length: 32:18
- Label: Southern Lord Records
- Producer: Steve Albini & Om

Om chronology
Conference of the Birds (2006)	Pilgrimage (2007)	God is Good (2009)

Professional ratings
Review scores
Source	Rating
AllMusic	4.5/5 stars
Pitchfork	(7.4/10)
PopMatters	8/10

Pilgrimage is the third studio album by American heavy metal band Om. It is the band's first release for the Southern Lord label. It was recorded at Electrical Audio by Steve Albini. It is the final studio album to feature Chris Hakius on drums.

== Track listing ==
No.	Title	Length
1.	"Pilgrimage"	10:33
2.	"Unitive Knowledge of the Godhead"	5:50
3.	"Bhima's Theme"	11:40
4.	"Pilgrimage (Reprise)"	4:15
Total length:		32:18

== Personnel ==
Om

- Al Cisneros – bass guitar, vocals
- Chris Hakius – drums, percussion

Production

- Steve Albini – production, mixing, engineering
- Bob Weston – mastering
