= The Clarity =

Single by Sleep
- Released: July 21, 2014; February 10, 2017 (reissue)
- Genre: Stoner metal
- Length: 9:50
- Label: Williams Street, Southern Lord, Third Man
- Songwriters: Al Cisneros: Matt Pike; Jason Roeder

Sleep singles chronology
| "The Clarity" (2014) | "Leagues Beneath" (2018) |

"The Clarity" is a single by the American stoner/doom metal band Sleep. The song was released digitally for free on July 21, 2014, through the cable network Adult Swim's 2014 weekly singles series. The release of "The Clarity" also marks the first release of newly recorded material in 15 years. Later, it was re-released on February 10, 2017, via Southern Lord Records as a 12" vinyl pressing and recut by Adam Gonsalves. In 2021, it was remixed and reissued again on the EP Iommic Life via Third Man Records.

Sleep reformed in 2009 and began performing live in addition to writing new riffs for future songs "sporadically". Adult Swim approached the band about releasing a new song as a part of its weekly singles series, and Sleep wrote "The Clarity" in "a couple days" separate from the other new material it had been working on. The band also commented that the song, "is an exercise in musical stream of thought, as all proper music should be" and that the lyrics are a "follow-up to a lifetime of marijuana enjoyment."

"The Clarity" was generally well received by music critics. Writing for NPR, Lars Gotrich wrote: "It captures Sleep at its heaviest and weediest, and despite the puff of smoke that pervades these 10 minutes, it's the band's cleanest-sounding recording." Colin Joyce writing for Spin wrote: "Built, like many of the band's best tracks, around Cisneros' thunderous, distorted basslines and the bleary haze of Pike's Tony Iommi indebted guitar snarls, 'The Clarity' hearkens straight back to the drone-y, stone-y tunes that the band was working on when they were teenagers." Writing for Exclaim!, Josiah Hughes wrote: "'The Clarity' is a heavy journey through meaty riffs, mid-tempo drums and plenty of drug references. At 10 minutes in length, it's also a perfect song to turn on and zone out to."

== Personnel ==
Sleep

- Al Cisneros – vocals, bass
- Matt Pike – guitars
- Jason Roeder – drums

Production

- John Golden – mastering
- Adam Gonsalves – lacquer cut (reissue)
- David V. D'Andrea – artwork (etching)
- Noah Landis – recording
