= Lichens (musician) =

American musician

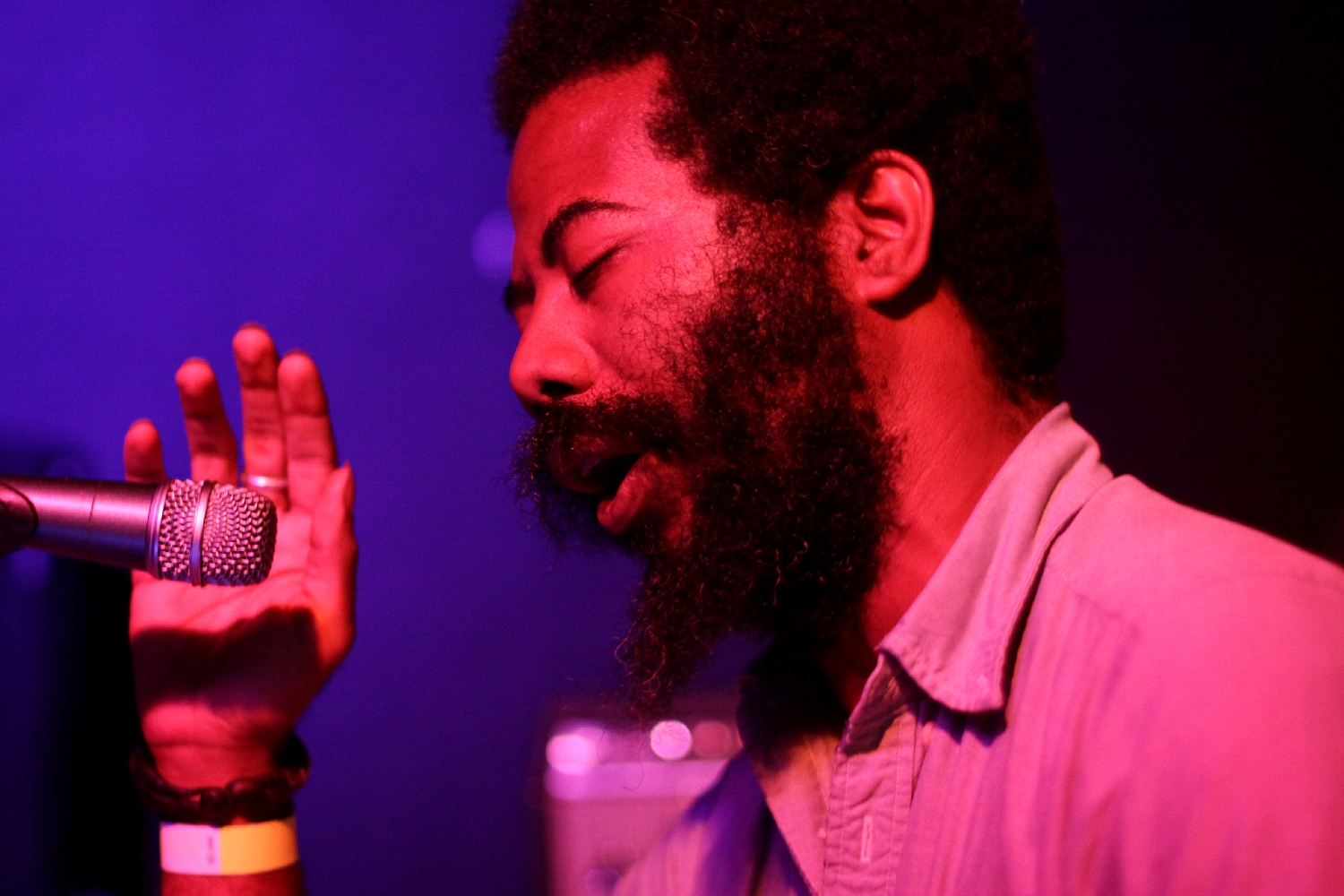
- Robert Aiki Aubrey Lowe performing with Om at Budapest in 2012

Background information
- Also known as: Lichens
- Born: Robert Aiki Aubrey Lowe
- Origin: United States
- Occupations: Musician; composer; sound artist
- Instruments: Vocals; tambura; keyboards

Robert Aiki Aubrey Lowe is an American musician, composer and sound artist who formerly recorded under the moniker Lichens. In live past performances as Lichens and currently as Robert Aiki Aubrey Lowe, Lowe incorporates spontaneous arrangements of voice and modular synthesizer patch pieces.

Lowe was previously a member of 90 Day Men before beginning the moniker. In the past, Lowe would use acoustic and electric guitars, and on some occasions, percussion. Lichens' first release was The Psychic Nature of Being, a three-track album recorded as a one-time improvisation without overdubbing. In 2007, Lichens released Omns, which was intended to be a continuation of The Psychic Nature of Being using slightly different techniques in recording and editing. Since 2007 Lowe has been focused on live performance and the physicality of sound as well as many releases and collaborations.

In 2008, Lichens toured extensively opening for instrumental post-rock band Explosions in the Sky and played at their curated All Tomorrow's Parties music festival. Lowe performed in the noise rock supergroup Singer, playing bass and providing vocals on two albums for Drag City with Todd Rittman and Adam Vida of U.S. Maple and Ben Vida of Town & Country. He performed tambura and vocals for stoner/doom metal band Om on their albums God Is Good and Advaitic Songs, and also joined them on stage. He contributed with vocals on the album Monument to Time End by black metal band Twilight.

In 2012, Lowe contributed the tracks "Shoreline Scoring" and "Faeries" to Ashim Ahluwalia's film, Miss Lovely.

== Discography ==
As Lichens

- R. Brown (self-released, 2004)
- The Psychic Nature of Being (Kranky/Holy Mountain, 2005)
- Restoration of Temperament/If You So Choose… Live ATL '06 (Split 12" EP with Lexie Mountain, HOSS Records, 2006)
- Omns (Kranky, 2007)
- "Escapism in a Comedic Forum" on The Great Koonaklaster Speaks: A John Fahey Celebration, a tribute CD to guitarist John Fahey (Table of the Elements, 2007)
- White/Lichens – "S/T" (collaboration with White/Light on Holy Mountain, 2007)
- Cloudland Canyon/Lichens – "Exterminating Angel" (collaboration with Cloudland Canyon on Holy Mountain, 2008)
- Time & Light (self-released, 2008)
- Tanith (self-released, 2008)
- lítiȭ fólk (morc tapes, 2012)

As Robert Aiki Aubrey Lowe

- Gyromancy (collaboration with Rose Lazar on Thrill Jockey, 2008)
- Fazo IV: La Kvalito de Speguloj (Rainbow Body, 2009)
- Eclipses (collaboration with Rose Lazar on Thrill Jockey, 2010)
- Terre Plate (Los Discos Enfantasmes, 2011)
- Timon Irnok Manta (Type, 2012)
- Cognition / Observation (DDS, 2016)
- Kulthan (Latency, 2017)
- Levitation Praxis Pt 4 (DDS, 2017)
- Candyman (original score soundtrack, 2021)
- Manifestations in the Shadow of an Uncertain Land (Kou Records, 2026)

With Singer

- Unhistories (Drag City, 2008)
- Mindreading (Drag City, 2011)

With Om

- God Is Good (Drag City, 2009)
- Advaitic Songs (Drag City, 2012)

== Filmography ==
- Last Kind Words (2012)
- Miss Lovely (2012)
- Wolves from Another Kingdom (2012) (short)
- A Spell to Ward Off the Darkness (2013)
- Old Man Carmentine (Washington Heights, Brooklyn, Southampton and the Infinite Whistle) (2014)
- Candyman (2021)
- Master (2022)
- Telemarketers (2023)
- Power (2024)
- Union (2024)
- Seeds (2025)
- Life After (2025)
- The Man in My Basement (2025)
- Rock Springs (2026)
