= Asbestosdeath =

American doom metal band

Asbestos Death
- Origin: San Jose, California, U.S.
- Genres: Doom metal, sludge metal
- Years active: Late 1980s – 1990
- Labels: Profane Existence; Southern Lord
- Spinoffs: Sleep, High on Fire, Om, Noothgrush, The Sabians, Operator Generator, It Is I
- Members: Al Cisneros; Chris Hakius; Tom Choi; Matt Pike
- Past members: Keith Krate

Asbestosdeath was an American doom metal band from San Jose, California, the precursor to the highly influential band Sleep.

== History ==
Asbestosdeath started life in the late 1980s as a trio consisting of Al Cisneros on bass, Chris Hakius on drums, and Tom Choi on guitar. Matt Pike later joined as a second guitarist. They recorded two 7"s: their first (Unclean, 1989) was self-released (Asbestos Records) and a second 7" (Dejection, 1990) was released later that year by Profane Existence. Choi left Asbestosdeath to form Noothgrush after the release of the second 7". The band recruited Justin Marler to replace Choi and changed their name to Sleep.

In 2007, Southern Lord Records reissued Asbestosdeath's two 7"s on CD and 10" vinyl. The four songs on the album comprise the entirety of Asbestosdeath's recordings.

== Band members ==
- Al Cisneros – bass, vocals
- Chris Hakius – drums
- Tom Choi – guitar
- Matt Pike – guitar
- Keith Krate – guitar
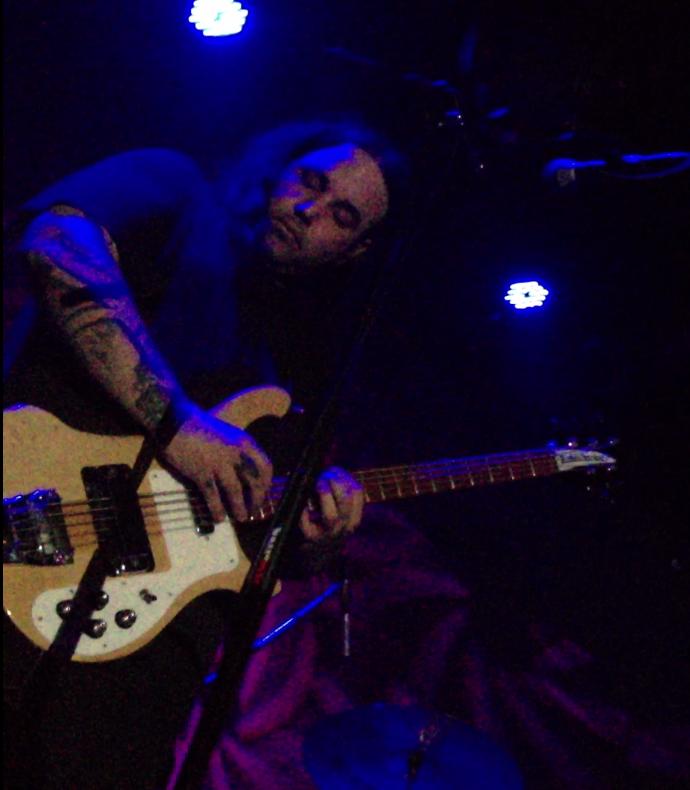
Al Cisneros

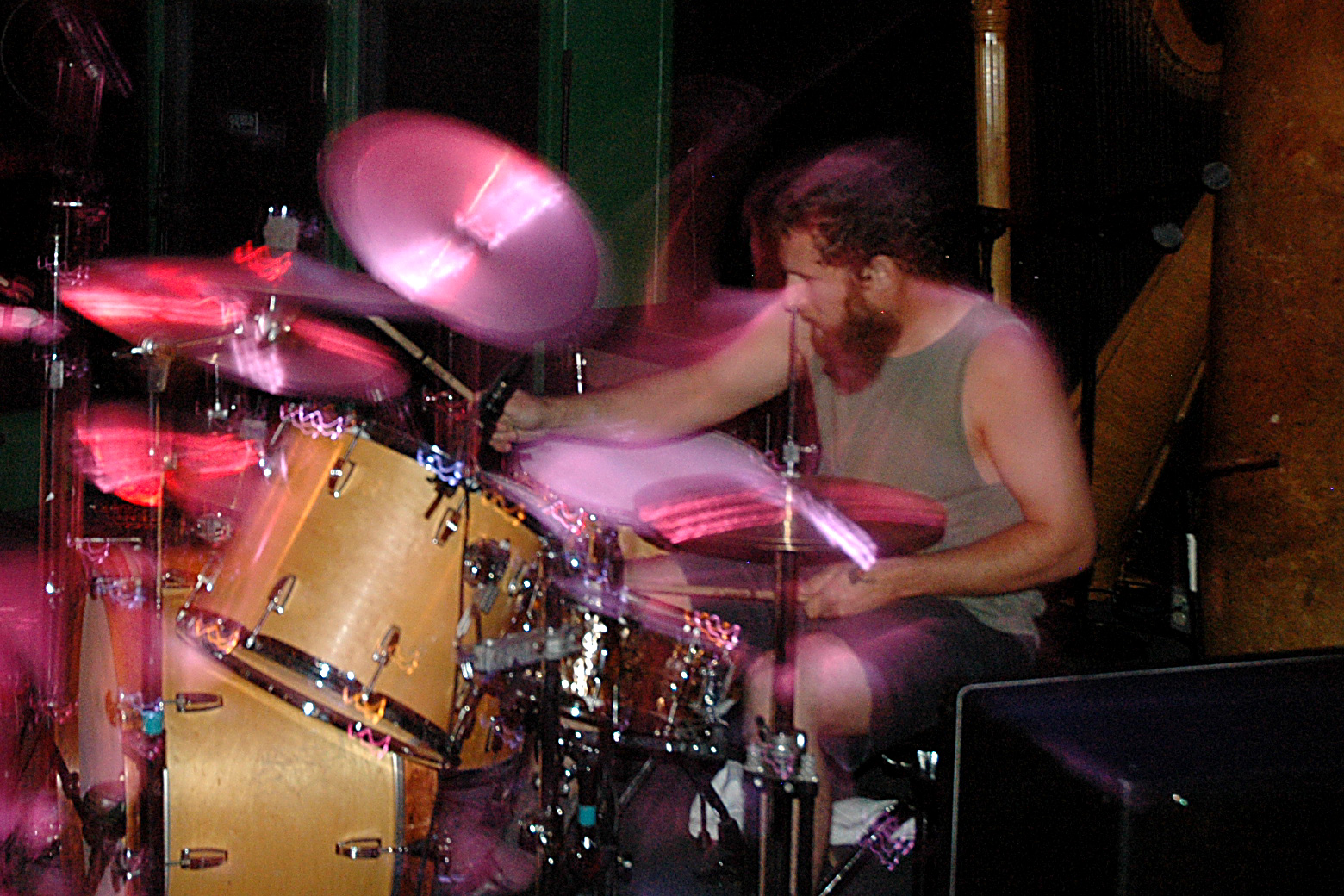
Chris Hakius

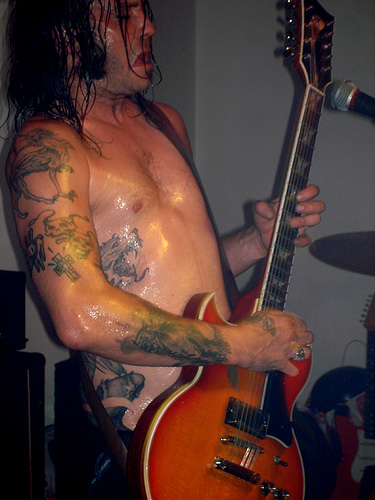
Matt Pike

== Discography ==
- Unclean 7" (1989 Asbestos Records)
- Dejection 7" (1990 Profane Existence)
- Dejection/Unclean CD/10" (2007 Southern Lord Records)
