= It's Casual =

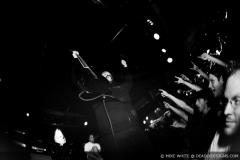
- It's Casual in 2008

Background information
- Origin: Los Angeles, California
- Genres: Hardcore punk
- Years active: 2001–present
- Label: Friendly Hills Recording Company
- Members: Eddie Solis
- Website: itscasual.tv

It's Casual is a two-piece Los Angeles hardcore punk band formed in 1996. Founded and fronted by Eddie Solis, the band has released the three studio albums Buicregl (2002), Stop Listening to Bad Music (2004), and The New Los Angeles (2007) all on CD and LP. It's Casual has performed with groups such as Story of the Year, Fu Manchu, Mastodon, High on Fire, and Zeke.

== History ==
=== Early years ===
It's Casual was formed in the ashes of punk band 12 inch rulers 1996 in Los Angeles, starting with ex 12inch members Eddie Solis on guitar, and David Sanchez on drums, later adding a bass player and a 2nd guitarist for a short term. The name was inspired by a line in The Wild Life, Cameron Crowe's follow up to Fast Times at Ridgemont High. Solis soon met W.C.E., the drummer for Co-Ed who tried playing bass for the established duo. He later realized they had similar interests, such as Black Flag, The Melvins, and arena rock like Kiss and AC/DC. W.C.E. talked Eddie into taking drummer Sanchez's spot and continuing as a two-piece band with a more basic sound. The band has a hardcore punk and doom metal sound, with Solis on vocals and guitar and W.C.E. on drums.

=== The New Los Angeles ===
After returning from a summer tour in 2006 the band began working with producer Sergio J. Chavez (Motörhead/Helmet) for a third album, The New Los Angeles. In January 2008 the band had supporting slots for Fu Manchu on their North American tour. The New Los Angeles LP was released in Fall of 2008.

Mastodon handpicked It's Casual to open for them in Athens, Georgia in October 2008, and the band played in-store at Criminal Records the day before in Atlanta, Georgia.

During this time Solis casually befriended the Los Angeles music video director Robert Schober, also known as Roboshobo. Schober has previously directed videos for Mastodon, Metallica, and The B-52s. He began listening to The New Los Angeles. Four months later he offered to film a music video for the album's title track. The video was released in June 2009, and first premiered at The Viper Room Lounge.

The band has released a split 7-inch from Basement Records with the hardcore band Bullet Treatment, and has also announced production on a new album titled The New Los Angeles II: Less Violence More Violins, which is purportedly inspired by the California education budget deficit.

=== Shows ===
The band has performed with bands such as Story of the Year, Mastodon, High on Fire, Fireball Ministry, Zeke, 16, Visual Discrimination, and Mondo Generator. They regularly play at venues such as The Viper Room and The Relax Bar, which is booked and managed by Solis as a metal venue in Hollywood.

== Style ==
The band has drawn favorable comparisons to Black Flag, Motörhead, and Discharge, and Solis has described the sound as "L.A. hardcore" and "L.A. skate rock." Themes include "municipal outrage" at freeways in Los Angeles and daily incidents and observations from living in the city. Solis has also cited Kiss as one of the band's onstage influences, quoting "For me, Kiss plays very loud and they engage with the audience," similar to Kiss, they have a wall of amps behind them on stage as both a practical and visual part of the show.

== Discography ==
Studio albums

- Buicregl (2002) CD/LP
- Stop Listening to Bad Music (2004) CD/LP
- The New Los Angeles (2007) CD/LP

EPs

- It's Casual/Bullet Treatment Split (7-inch vinyl)
