= Inerrant Rays of Infallible Sun (Blackship Shrinebuilder) =

EP by Om and Current 93
- Released: June 13, 2006
- Genre: Neofolk, stoner metal
- Length: 16:22
- Label: Neurot / Durtro

Professional ratings
Review scores
| Source | Rating |
|---|---|
| AllMusic | 3.5/5 stars |

Inerrant Rays of Infallible Sun (Blackship Shrinebuilder) is a split EP by the bands Om and Current 93. It was released in 2006 on the Neurot record label.

The US pressing was limited to 1,500 copies on 10" clear green vinyl. A UK/EU pressing was also made and is available in 10" clear, clear purple and clear red vinyl.

== Track listing ==
Side A

1. "Rays of the Sun/To the Shrinebuilder" - Om - 8:04

Side B

1. "Inerrant Infallible (Black Ships at Nineveh and Edom)" - Current 93 - 8:18
