= Volume One (Sleep album) =

Studio album by Sleep
- Released: 1991
- Studio: Razor's Edge (San Francisco)
- Genre: Doom metal; sludge metal; stoner metal
- Length: 45:48
- Label: Tupelo Recording Company

Sleep chronology
Volume One (1991)	Sleep's Holy Mountain (1992)

Professional ratings
Review scores
Source	Rating
AllMusic	3/5 stars

Volume One is the debut studio album by the American band Sleep. Not long after Sleep's formation, the band went to Razor's Edge studios to start recording. It was the only album recorded with original guitarist Justin Marler, before he would depart from the band in fall 1991 to become an Orthodox monk. Volume One showcases a darker sound and stronger doom metal and sludge metal influences than Sleep's later work. The image featured on the cover is taken from the Salvador Dalí painting Soft Self-Portrait with Fried Bacon.

"The Suffering", "Anguish" and "Scourge" are all re-recordings from the band's days as Asbestosdeath. Volume One would be released sometime in 1991 on CD, Vinyl and Cassette. "Scourge" would be omitted from the cassette and vinyl versions of the album.

The vinyl edition of the album would remain out-of-print for years until it was reissued in 2014.

== Track listing ==
No.	Title	Length
1.	"Stillborn"	6:18
2.	"The Suffering"	5:12
3.	"Numb"	3:30
4.	"Anguish"	5:37
5.	"Catatonic"	6:04
6.	"Nebuchadnezzar's Dream"	4:47
7.	"The Wall of Yawn"	5:32
8.	"Prey"	3:46
9.	"Scourge"	5:02
Total length:		45:48

== Personnel ==
Sleep

- Chris Hakius – drums
- Al Cisneros – bass, vocals
- Matt Pike – guitar, vocals
- Justin Marler – guitar, vocals

Additional personnel

- Billy Anderson – recording
