= Shrinebuilder (album) =

Studio album by Shrinebuilder
- Released: October 12, 2009
- Recorded: 2009
- Studio: Westbeach Recorders (Hollywood, California)
- Genre: Doom metal, stoner metal
- Length: 37:07
- Label: Neurot Recordings
- Producer: Shrinebuilder; Deaf Nephews (Crover and Kasai)

Shrinebuilder is the self-titled lone album by American heavy metal supergroup Shrinebuilder. It was released on October 12, 2009, via Neurot Recordings.

== Reception ==
Professional ratings
Review scores
Source	Rating
AllMusic	4.5/5 stars
Classic Rock	7/10 stars

Critic Philip Whitehouse described it as "expansive, intriguing and engrossing material from the cream of the doom metal crop." Derrick Koo of The Quietus remarked how "Shrinebuilder doesn't try to explore new territory, but it captures its players doing what they do best", but wondered if it is "possible for a supergroup like this one to truly step out of its predecessors' long shadows." Classic Rock reviewer described the album as "the work of kindred spirits, (...) which allows each member's voice to shine through", and indicated the song "Blind for All to See" as the best track.

== Track listing ==
All songs written by Shrinebuilder.

No.	Title	Vocals	Length
1.	"Solar Benediction"	Scott Weinrich, Scott Kelly	8:44
2.	"Pyramid of the Moon"	Kelly, Al Cisneros	7:35
3.	"Blind for All to See"	Kelly	7:27
4.	"The Architect"	Weinrich, Kelly	5:56
5.	"Science of Anger"	Weinrich, Kelly, Cisneros	9:25

== Personnel ==
- Scott "Wino" Weinrich – vocals on tracks 1, 4–5, guitar
- Scott Kelly – vocals, guitar
- Al Cisneros – vocals on tracks 2, 5, bass
- Dale Crover – drums, backing vocals on tracks 3–5
- Toshi Kasai – keyboards
- The Deaf Nephews (Dale Crover and Toshi Kasai) – production
