= Matamp =

British manufacturer of electric guitar amplifiers

- Type: LLC
- Founded: 1945
- Founder: Mat Mathias
- Headquarters: United Kingdom
- Products: Amplifiers, speaker cabinets
- Website: www.matamp.co.uk

Matamp is a British electric guitar amplifier manufacturing company, best known for its handwired amplifier heads and speaker cabinets. It was established in 1964 by Mat Mathias.

== History ==
Matamp founder, Mat Mathias, started the company RadioCraft by 1946. What started as an interest ultimately developed into a fully-fledged business building amplifiers for the burgeoning music scene in the early sixties. Behind his wife’s retail shop, selling accessories to young musicians, Mathias’s workshop/manufacturing facility also extended into a fully fledged recording studio complete with disc cutters for young bands to record and cut their own demos. This resulted in the formation of MAT Records. His customers would come and see him, tell him what they wanted, and he would build it and/or record it. Patterns would emerge, and trends soon changed into product lines.

Long-term friend and hi-fi amplifier designer Tony Emerson joined with Mat in the early 1960s, shortly after the name MATAMP (Mat and Tony amplifiers) was coined. As word got around Matamp would soon be working with such musical luminaries as Peter Green of Fleetwood Mac (who Mathias joined on their US tour in the late 60’s) and recording early demos with the likes of Graham Gouldman who would go on to form 10cc.

After Emerson’s departure and Matamp's subsequent development work with Fleetwood Mac, Matamp formed a partnership with Cliff Cooper. Cooper owned the Orange music store and the new partnership began producing Orange Matamp amps from Mathias's Huddersfield workshop. In 1971 Orange Matamp outsold Marshall, giving Cooper a taste of high volume sales. However Mathias was not prepared to forego quality standards in favour of mass-production, so the Orange Matamp partnership was dissolved. Orange Amps went on to be a major international amplification company so Matamp has also become widely recognised due to this early collaboration with Orange.

Their mixing console Matamp Stereo Supernova was named one of the world's best mixers by Mixmag in a 2012 list, and features on the cover of the 2013 compilation album 12"/80s/Club Classics.

Matamp also made P.A. amplifiers in the late 70s and into the early 80s. These were known as Clubmans. There were 2 versions of these; the Clubman 1 with 4 inputs and the Clubman 2 with 4 inputs and selectable Echo which was run through an external effects unit. There were approximately 245 solid state 100 Watt Matamps made between 1974 and 1980. These consisted of Clubman 1&2s and Slave amplifiers. In 1981, they switched to Hitachi MOSFET Technology. Between 1981 and 1989, around 90 Mosfet 100 watt units were made.
