= Om / Six Organs of Admittance =

Single by Om and Six Organs of Admittance
- Released: July 10, 2006
- Recorded: 2006
- Genre: Experimental rock
- Length: 9:38
- Label: Holy Mountain Records

"Om / Six Organs of Admittance" is a split 7-inch by the bands Om and Six Organs of Admittance. It was released in 2006 by Holy Mountain Records. During pressing "Side A" and "Side B" labels on the record were accidentally reversed.

== Track listing ==
Side A: Om

1. "Bedouin's Vigil"

Side B: Six Organs of Admittance

2. "Assyrian Blood"
