= Om (band) =

American rock band

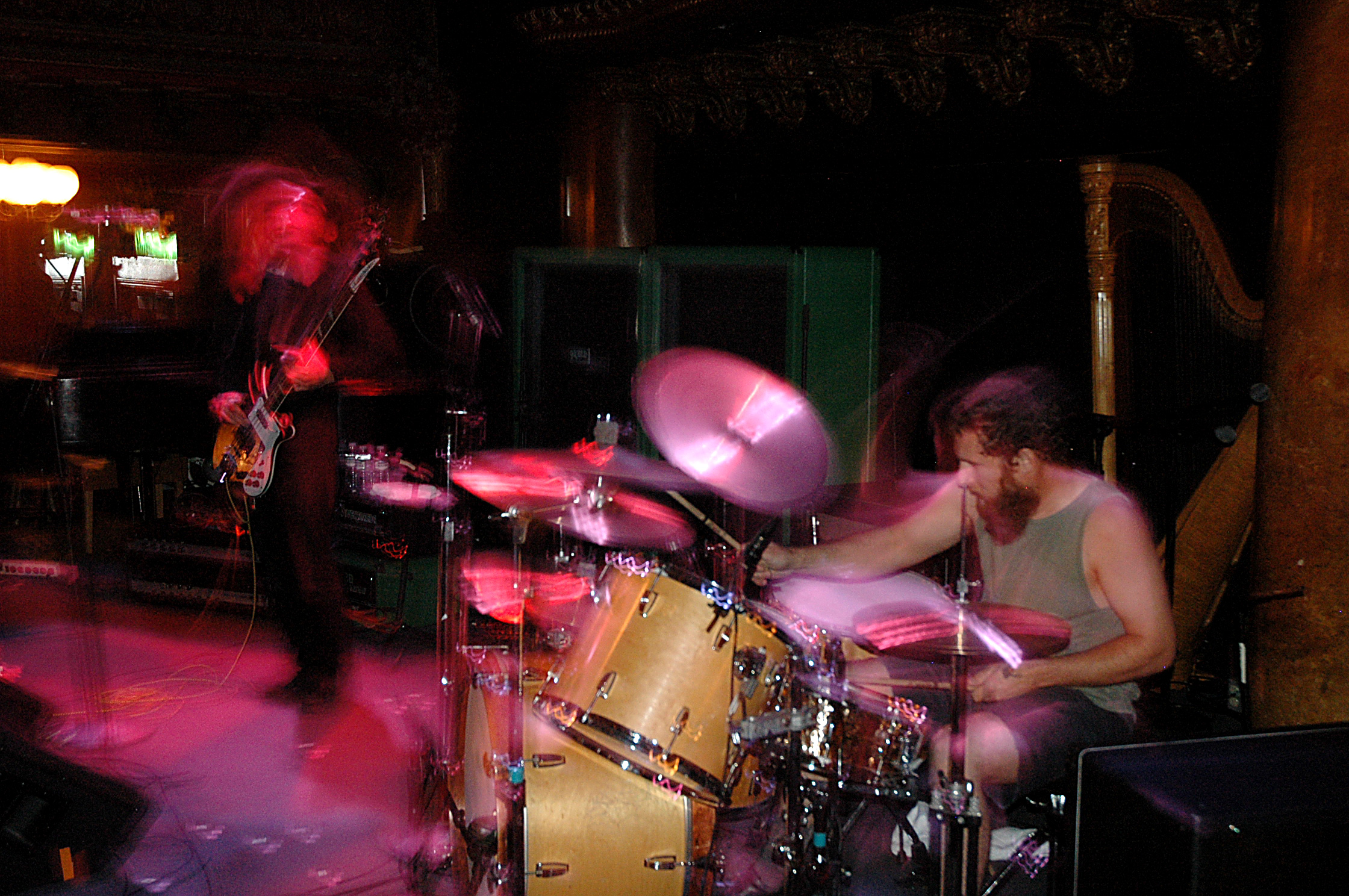
- Al Cisneros (left) and Chris Hakius (right)

Background information
- Origin: San Francisco, California, U.S.
- Genres: Stoner rock; stoner metal; psychedelic rock; doom metal drone metal; ambient
- Years active: 2003–present
- Labels: Drag City, Southern Lord, Holy Mountain, Sub Pop
- Members: Al Cisneros; Emil Amos; Tyler Trotter
- Past members: Chris Hakius; Robert Lowe
- Website: omvibratory.com

Om (sometimes stylized as OM) is an American stoner rock band from San Francisco, California. Formed as a duo in 2003 by bassist Al Cisneros and drummer Chris Hakius, who had earlier been the rhythm section of the band Sleep. Om is known for droning, bass-driven songs inspired by religion and mysticism.

Om is currently a trio consisting of Cisneros, Emil Amos (drums), and Tyler Trotter (keyboards).

== History ==
Om's works incorporate musical structures similar to Tibetan, Byzantine and Ethiopian chanting, as heard on the debut album Variations on a Theme. The band's name itself derives from the Hindu concept of Om, which refers to the natural vibration of the universe. Every album from Pilgrimage onward features Eastern Orthodox iconography in the cover art.

Om's first three albums feature Al Cisneros on vocals and bass and Chris Hakius on drums.

On December 5, 2007, Om performed in Jerusalem. Their performance lasted for over five hours and a portion of that show was released on 12" vinyl by Southern Lord as Live at Jerusalem.

The band's 2007 album Pilgrimage was chosen as Mojo Magazine's "Underground Album of the Year". In that same year, Om famously played two multiple-hour shows, with one show in Jerusalem rumored to last somewhere between four and six hours.

On January 31, 2008, Chris Hakius left the band and was replaced by drummer Emil Amos of Grails. On the last tour with Hakius songs that would later become "Gebel Barkal" and "Thebes" were being performed live.

On August 15, 2008, Om released a 7" 45 entitled "Gebel Barkal" for Sub Pop's Singles Club. A live vinyl-only LP, Conference Live, followed in 2009 on Important Records.

Om's fourth full-length studio album, God is Good, was recorded by Steve Albini and released by Drag City on September 29, 2009.

The band's fifth studio album, Advaitic Songs, was released by Drag City on July 24, 2012. It met with critical acclaim.

In November 2013, the band played the final holiday camp edition of the All Tomorrow's Parties festival in Camber Sands, England.

== Members ==
=== Current ===
- Al Cisneros – bass, vocals (2003–present)
- Emil Amos – drums (2008–present)
- Tyler Trotter – guitar, synthesizer, percussion (2018–present)

=== Former ===
- Chris Hakius – drums (2003–2008)
- Robert Lowe – guitars, percussion, back-up vocals (2009–2018)

== Discography ==
=== Studio albums ===
Year	Title	Label
2005	Variations on a Theme	Holy Mountain
2006	Conference of the Birds	Holy Mountain
2007	Pilgrimage	Southern Lord
2009	God Is Good	Drag City
2012	Advaitic Songs	Drag City

=== Live albums ===
Year	Title	Label
2008	Live at Jerusalem	Southern Lord
2009	Live Conference	Important Records
2014	Live	Outer Battery Records
2019	BBC Radio 1	Drag City
2022	Live at Amoeba, San Francisco 2007	Holy Mountain

=== Singles and EPs ===
Year	Title	Type	Label
2006	Inerrant Rays of Infallible Sun (Blackship Shrinebuilder)	Single (split with Current 93)	Neurot Recordings
2006	Om / Six Organs of Admittance	Single (split with Six Organs of Admittance)	Holy Mountain
2008	Gebel Barkal	Single	Sub Pop
2013	Addis Dubplate	Remix "12	Drag City
2013	Gethsemane Dubplate	Remix "12	Drag City
2023	Gebel Barkal / Version	Single	Drag City

=== Music videos ===
- "State of Non-Return" (2012)
