= Sleep (band) =

American stoner/doom metal band

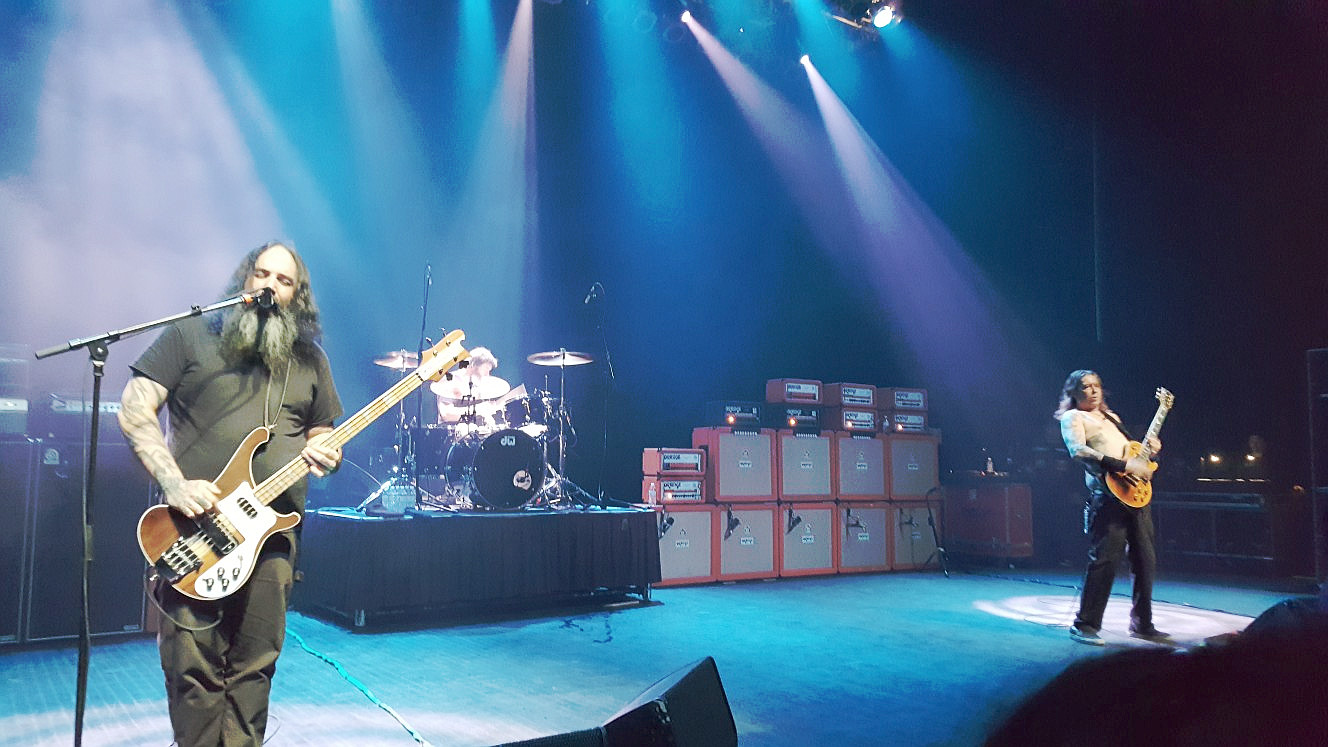
- Sleep live in March 2018. From left to right: Al Cisneros, Jason Roeder, and Matt Pike.

Background information
- Origin: San Jose, California, U.S.
- Genres: Doom metal; stoner metal; Space rock
- Years active: 1990–1998; 2009–present
- Labels: London; Very Small; Earache; Southern Lord; Tee Pee; The Music Cartel; Third Man
- Spinoffs: High on Fire, Om
- Spinoff of: Asbestosdeath
- Members: Al Cisneros; Bubba Dupree; Dale Crover
- Past members: Chris Hakius; Justin Marler; Jason Roeder; Matt Pike
- Website: weedian.com

Sleep is an American stoner/doom metal band from San Jose, California. Bassist and vocalist Al Cisneros has been the only constant member throughout the band's history. Critic Eduardo Rivadavia describes them as "perhaps the ultimate stoner rock band" and notes they exerted a strong influence on metal in the 1990s.

The band was formed in 1990 with Cisneros, guitarist Matt Pike, drummer Chris Hakius and fourth member Justin Marler. Marler left after the band's debut album, Volume One (1991). Their second album, Sleep's Holy Mountain (1992), gained the band wider attention. However, a conflict with London Records regarding the marketability of their third album Dopesmoker led to Sleep's breakup in 1998; the album was ultimately released in its original form in 2003. Both Holy Mountain and Dopesmoker have been acclaimed as doom metal and stoner metal classics.

During the breakup, Pike formed High on Fire while Cisneros and Hakius formed Om. Sleep reformed in 2009 with Neurosis drummer Jason Roeder replacing Hakius. The band surprise-released their comeback album The Sciences in 2018. In 2026, the band unveiled a new lineup replacing Roeder and Pike with Melvins drummer Dale Crover and former Void guitarist Bubba Dupree and released their new album, Hempispheres.

== History ==
=== Early years ===
Sleep evolved in the early 1990s from the band Asbestosdeath, which was established by vocalist/bassist Al Cisneros, drummer Chris Hakius, and guitarist Tom Choi. Asbestosdeath expanded to a quartet with the introduction of Matt Pike on guitar, and recorded two singles - "Dejection" for Profane Existence and the self-released "Unclean". Choi departed, and later founded Operator Generator, It Is I, Noothgrush, and Las Vegas' Black Jetts. Asbestosdeath recruited Justin Marler as replacement and the band adopted the new name, Sleep.

=== Recording era ===
Their debut album Volume One was released in 1991. Frequently compared to bands like Saint Vitus, Sleep soon gained a devoted fanbase within the developing doom metal scene. Marler quit the band soon after to take up life as an Eastern Orthodox monk, leaving the band as a power trio for the recording of their Volume Two EP, which was released officially by Off the Disk Records in 1991.

The band's next album was sent to the independent label Earache as a demo. Recorded at Razors Edge studios in San Francisco, with Billy Anderson as engineer, the tape showcased Sleep's love of all things retro, from the blatant Black Sabbath/Blue Cheer influences, to their fixation with 1970's-style tube amplification. The label immediately signed the band and released the tape exactly as it was received.

Sleep's Holy Mountain (1992) is widely considered the seminal album in the evolution of stoner metal. The album's release was followed by a potentially lucrative offer from London Records, and Sleep signed with them. Around this time, Earache released its first Black Sabbath tribute album, and Sleep contributed a cover of "Snowblind".

Under their new contract, Sleep began work on its third album, Dopesmoker, in 1994. Much to the dismay of executives at London Records, Dopesmoker was a single song, over an hour long. London Records declared the album unmarketable and refused to release it. The label had it remixed and cut up into sections by David Sardy, which led to a deadlock due to the band being unhappy with the result. Frustrated and generally unhappy with the situation, the members of Sleep decided to disband.

=== Post-breakup ===
In 1998, Sleep released Jerusalem as an "official bootleg". One year later, Jerusalem was given an official legitimate release by The Music Cartel in the US and Rise Above Records in Europe.

Finally, in 2003 the original version of Dopesmoker was officially released by Tee Pee Records. It is generally considered the definitive version of the album. An excerpted version can be heard on Jim Jarmusch's Broken Flowers original soundtrack.

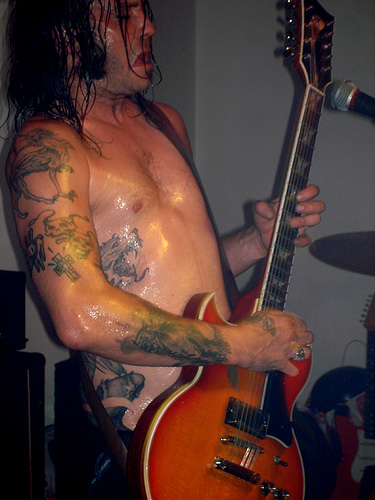
Matt Pike is also the frontman of the band High on Fire.

Cisneros and Hakius later formed the doom metal band Om, while Pike formed sludge metal band High on Fire.

In 2007 a CD compilation of both 7-inch releases of the pre-Sleep band Asbestosdeath was released on Southern Lord Records.

=== Reunion and The Sciences ===
In May 2009, Sleep reformed to perform two exclusive reunion sets in Britain as part of the All Tomorrow's Parties music festival. During these shows, the band performed an unheard song that had been written during the Dopesmoker recording sessions, titled "Antarcticans Thawed," for the first time.

After the band's initial reunion performance, original drummer Chris Hakius decided to retire from music to raise a family, and he was replaced on drums by Jason Roeder of experimental metal band Neurosis. The reconfigured lineup played the ATP New York 2010 music festival in Monticello, New York, where it performed Holy Mountain in its entirety. The band followed up this performance with a tour of the rest of the United States, playing headlining dates and festivals, through September.

From 2010 onward, Sleep performed similar sporadic festival and touring engagements when the members' otherwise busy touring schedules permitted. In late 2012, in conjunction with an upcoming appearance at Maryland Deathfest, the band stated that it considers Sleep to be a "full, reunited band." In 2014, Al Cisneros announced in an interview that the band was working on a new record. On July 21, 2014, a new song titled "The Clarity" was released via Adult Swim Singles.

In November 2017, the band members posted a message in Morse code stating that they had almost finished recording material for a new album. On April 19, 2018, the band surprise-announced The Sciences, their first album in nearly 20 years, to be released the next day on Third Man Records. Its release date if April 20 also fell on Record Store Day weekend. It was met with critical acclaim; Pitchfork wrote in their review, "[The Sciences] makes everything that was originally great about Sleep even better." Spin declared that the record gives "stoner-metal acolytes a bonafide miracle."

On May 23, 2018, Sleep released a new song titled "Leagues Beneath" through Adult Swim Singles and Third Man Records.

On November 11, 2019, the band announced an indefinite hiatus. On October 26, 2021, the band announced a return to live shows in April 2022.

=== New lineup and Hempispheres ===
On January 30, 2025, drummer Jason Roeder announced on Instagram that he had been fired from the band by its manager in November 2024, and had not spoken to the other Sleep members since.

On June 18, 2026, the band announced that Matt Pike was no longer part of the group and revealed a new lineup featuring Dale Crover (of Melvins) on drums and Bubba Dupree (formerly of Void) on guitar. This also came with the release of a new song, "Have Spacesuit Will Travel (4:20 Flexi Edit)". With the release of the physical copy of the single, the band also released the first Sleep Comic Book, written by Al Cisneros, and illustrated by Dave Kloc and Arik Roper. The fifth studio album, titled Hempispheres, was released digitally on September 3, 2026.

== Style and influences ==
Musically, Sleep's sound has been characterized as stoner metal built upon slow, down-tuned bass playing alongside similarly low guitar riffs. Repetition is frequently employed, working to create a "hypnotic state" supplemented by Al Cisneros' vocals.

Sleep has used cannabis-influenced imagery since the release of their second album, often delivered in a "quasi-religious" manner. In an interview about the making of Dopesmoker, Matt Pike acknowledged that the band spent "a lot" of their label advance on cannabis, and "a lot of time." Pike also said that about $75,000 was spent on customized amplifiers so the album would have numerous tone layers. He said the songwriting process for Dopesmoker was long, with the band "working on [the song] for like four years." Al Cisneros stated that smoking cannabis was vital to the song's creative process: "I was really dependent on the space I got into when I was using it [...] The line, 'Drop out of life [with bong in hand],' was kind of a creed at that point."

Their record The Sciences makes multiple allusions to Black Sabbath, whose sound heavily inspired Sleep. Tony Iommi is referenced in the lyrics of "Marijuanaut's Theme", and the song "Giza Butler" is a play on the city Giza and the name of Black Sabbath's bassist, Geezer Butler. Also in "Giza Butler", references are made to several things in Frank Herbert's 1965 novel Dune, including the gom jabbar (referred to as the "bong jabbar") and Muad'Dib (as "Muad'Doob").

== Members ==
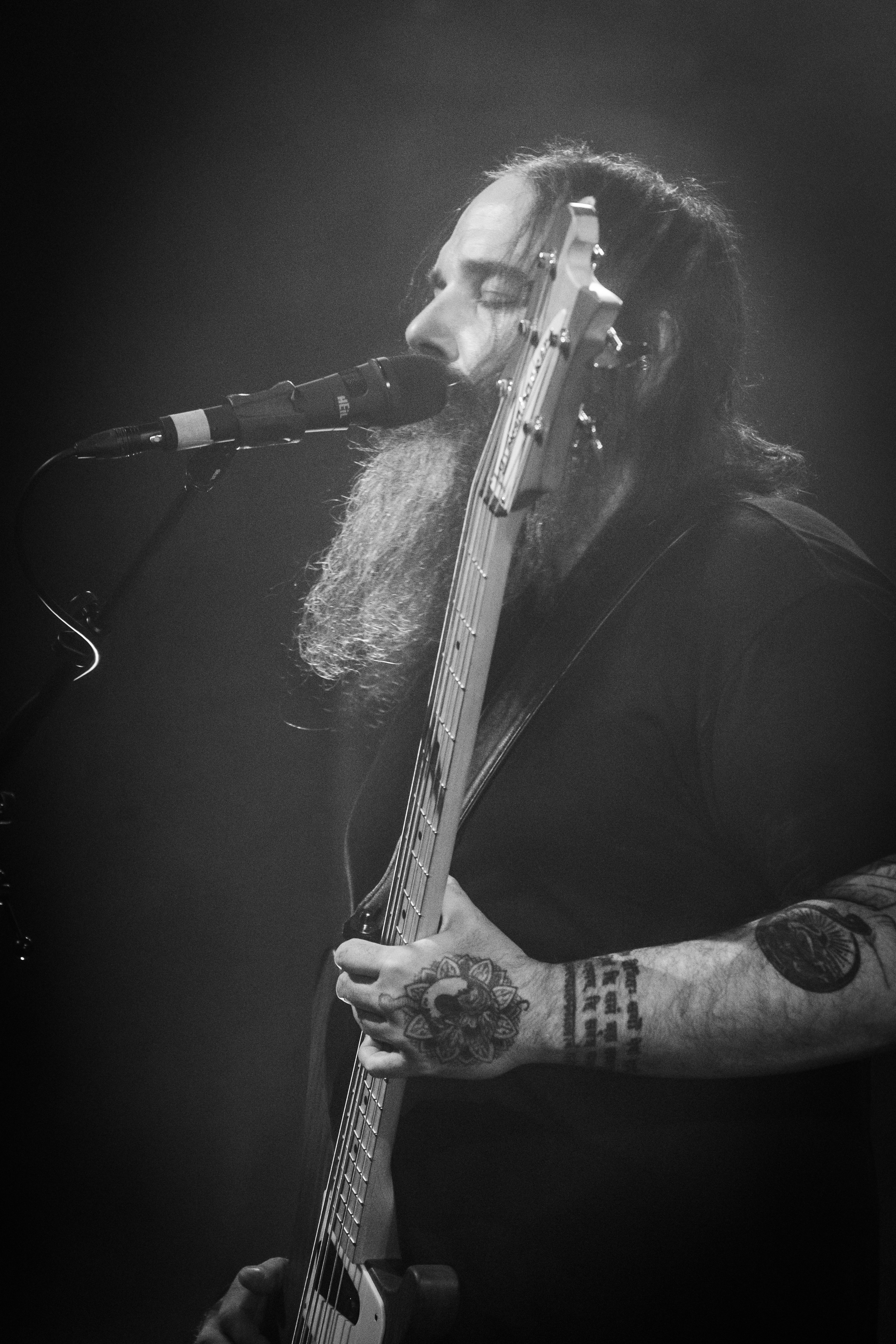
Founding and sole original member Al Cisneros

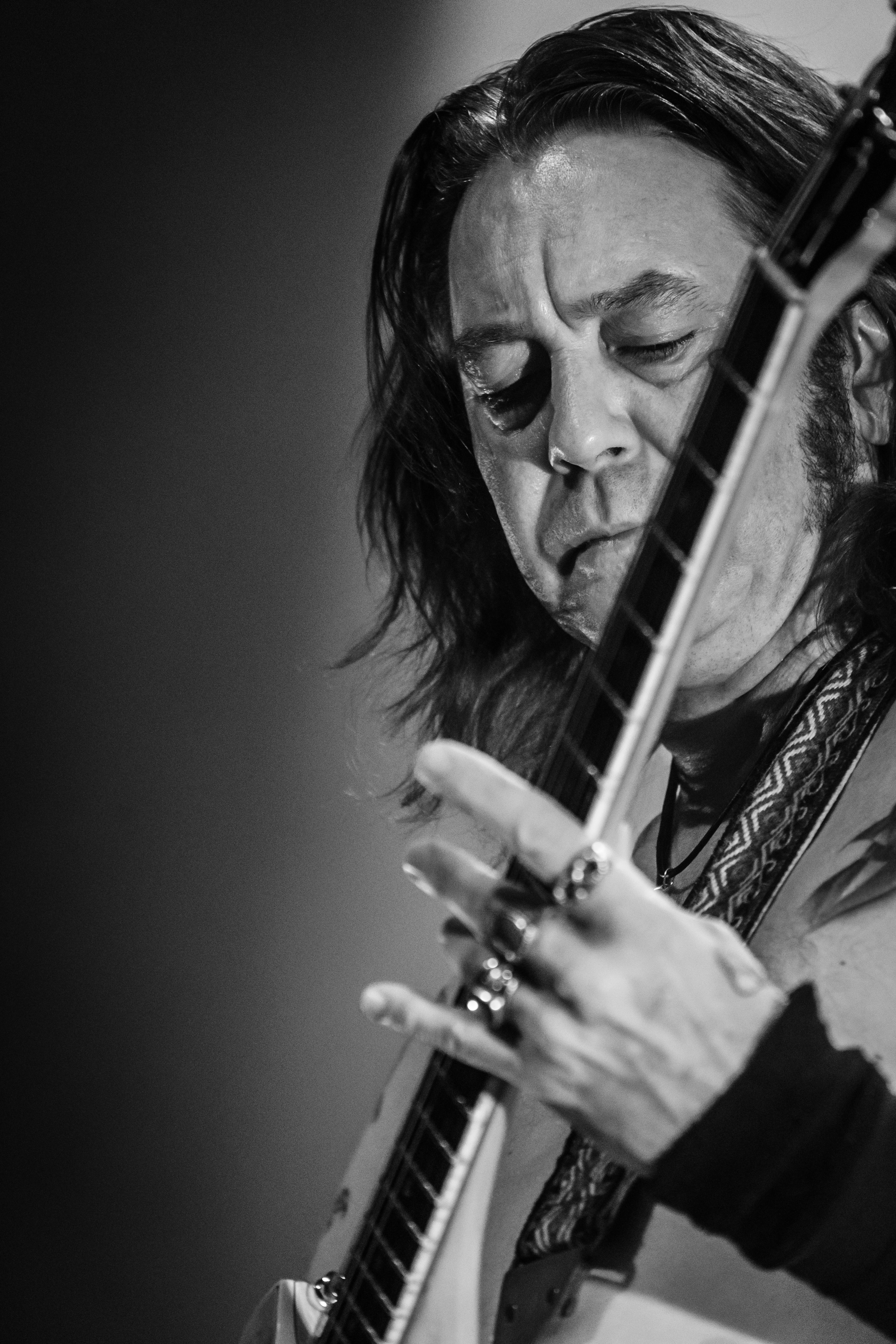
Longtime guitarist Matt Pike

Current lineup

- Al Cisneros – bass, vocals, water pipe (1990–1998, 2009–2019, 2021–present)
- Bubba Dupree – guitar (2026–present)
- Dale Crover – drums (2026–present)

Former members

- Matt Pike – guitar (1990–1998, 2009–2019, 2021–2026), vocals (1990–1991)
- Chris Hakius – drums (1990–1998, two performances in 2009)
- Justin Marler – guitar, vocals (1990–1991)
- Jason Roeder – drums (2010–2019, 2021–2024)

Timeline

== Discography ==
=== Albums ===
Note: The band's album Dopesmoker (2003) was originally released as Jerusalem in 1999 by The Music Cartel. This release was unauthorized by the band who discredit the validity of its quality and release.

- Volume One (1991) Tupelo Recording Company
- Sleep's Holy Mountain (1992) Earache Records
- Jerusalem and Dopesmoker (1999) The Music Cartel; (2003) Tee Pee Records; (2012) Southern Lord Records; (2022) Third Man Records
- The Sciences (2018) Third Man Records
- Hempispheres (2026) Third Man Records

=== EPs ===
- Volume Two (1992) Off the Disk Records
- Iommic Life (2021) Third Man Records
  - Released on 4/20/21, contains the remixed version of the single "The Clarity" and the single "Leagues Beneath."

=== Non-album tracks ===
- "Snowblind" (Black Sabbath cover) on Masters of Misery (1992) Earache Records
- "Dopesmoker (abridged version)" on Music from Broken Flowers (2005) Decca Records
- "The Clarity" on Adult Swim Singles Program 2014 (2014) Williams Street Records
- "Leagues Beneath" on Adult Swim Singles Program 2017 (2018) Williams Street Records/Third Man Records

=== Music videos ===
- Dragonaut (1993) Earache Records

== Bibliography ==
- Bennett, J. (2009). "High Times: The Making of Sleep's Jerusalem". In Mudrian, Albert (ed.). Precious Metal. Da Capo Press. ISBN 978-0-306-81806-6.
